= List of parks in the Gisborne District =

This is a list of parks, beaches, sports grounds, marine reserves and other protected areas in the Gisborne District of New Zealand's North Island.

Name	Coordinates	Location	Territorial authority area	Type
Adventure Playground	38.6698178°S 178.0001475°E	Awapuni	Gisborne	Playground, picnic area, public toilets
Alfred Cox Park	38.6672949°S 178.0168547°E	Gisborne Central	Gisborne	Local park, dog walking area
Anaura Bay Reserve	38.2352586°S 178.2938409°E	Anaura Bay	Gisborne	DOC reserve, walking track
Anzac Park	38.6608775°S 178.0299974°E	Inner Kaiti	Gisborne	Barbecue area, boat ramp, football, picnic area, playground
Atkinson Street Park	38.6477069°S 178.0064963°E	Mangapapa	Gisborne	Local park, dog walking area
Awapuni Stadium	38.671543°S 177.9991682°E	Awapuni	Gisborne	Sports ground, dog walking area
Ballance Street Reserve	38.655623°S 178.023796°E	Whataupoko	Gisborne	Local park, dog walking area
Barry Park	38.6549461°S 178.0096161°E	Te Hapara	Gisborne	Sports ground
Blackpool Street Reserve	38.6611581°S 177.9976302°E	Te Hapara	Gisborne	Local park, dog walking area
Childers Road Reserve	38.660609°S 178.014712°E	Gisborne Central	Gisborne	Sports ground
Eastwoodhill Arboretum	38.562546°S 177.7160803°E	Ngatapa	Gisborne	Walkway, cycleway
Fox Street Reserve	38.655438°S 178.040289°E	Whataupoko	Gisborne	Local park, dog walking area
Gisborne Botanical Gardens	38.657633°S 178.0202722°E	Gisborne Central	Gisborne	Picnic area, aviary, playground, toilets
Grant Road Reserve	38.6647487°S 178.0373676°E	Whataupoko	Gisborne	Local park, dog walking area
Gray's Bush Scenic Reserve	38.5965613°S 177.957448°E	Waimata Valley	Gisborne	DOC reserve, walking track
Hall Street Reserve	38.658384°S 178.024120°E	Whataupoko	Gisborne	Local park, dog walking area
Harry Barker Reserve	38.6498855°S 177.994233°E	Te Hapara	Gisborne	Cricket, hockey, public toilets
Hatea-A-Rangi Memorial Park	38.1314129°S 178.3141495°E	Tokomaru Bay	Gisborne	Sports ground
Heath Johnston Park	38.6837048°S 178.0521516°E	Tamarau	Gisborne	Sports ground
Kaiti Beach	38.6791243°S 178.0256725°E	Kaiti	Gisborne	Beach, local park, dog walking area
London Street Reserve	38.6765484°S 178.0416775°E	Kaiti	Gisborne	Local park, dog walking area
Makorori Headland	38.6654064°S 178.10019°E	Okitu	Gisborne	Walkway, cycleway
Matawai Reserve	38.359030°S 177.533289°E	Matawai	Gisborne	Sports ground
Midway Beach / Kopututea Sand Dunes	38.6908788°S 177.9583343°E	Awapuni	Gisborne	Beach, barbecue area, horse riding, jet skiing, kite surfing, dog walking area
Nelson Park	38.6456956°S 177.9933004°E	Riverdale	Gisborne	Sports ground, local park, dog walking area
Okitu Bush Scenic Reserve	38.664829°S 178.0984292°E	Okitu	Gisborne	DOC reserve, walkway
Otoko Walkway	38.4648949°S 177.6578689°E	Otoko	Gisborne	DOC reserve, walkway
Oval Reserve	38.6629659°S 178.0065999°E	Awapuni	Gisborne	Cricket, rugby, public toilets
Patutahi Soccer Ground	38.625401°S 177.888512°E	Patutahi	Gisborne	Sports ground
Rere Falls / Rere Reserve	38.5374631°S 177.6074253°E	Rere	Gisborne	Walkway, cycleway, picnic area, swimming, trout fishing, public toilets
Reynolds Creek Reserve / Sandown Park	38.65947°S 177.9978555°E	Elgin	Gisborne	Local park, dog walking area
Sheehan Street Reserve	38.658785°S 178.026855°E	Whataupoko	Gisborne	Local park, dog walking area
Stafford Street Reserve	38.660772°S 178.032551°E	Whataupoko	Gisborne	Local park, dog walking area
Te Arai Domain	38.677125°S 177.909728°E	Manutuke	Gisborne	Sports ground
Te Araroa Domain	37.633096°S 178.373828°E	Te Araroa	Gisborne	Sports ground
Te Karaka Recreation Ground	38.472995°S 177.865507°E	Te Karaka	Gisborne	Sports ground
Te Tapuwae o Rongokako Marine Reserve	38.6069599°S 178.1891548°E	Whangara	Gisborne	DOC reserve, marine reserve
Titirangi Reserve / Titirangi Domain / Kaiti Hill	38.6774868°S 178.027636°E	Inner Kaiti	Gisborne	Dog walking area, fitness trail, lookout, picnic area, playground
Uawa Reserve	38.372395°S 178.289588°E	Tolaga Bay	Gisborne	Sports ground
Waiherere Domain	38.5773729°S 177.9338123°E	Waihirere	Gisborne	Playground, cycleway, dog walking area, jet skiing, kite surfing, picnic area
Waikanae Beach	38.6703344°S 178.014442°E	Victoria	Gisborne	Walkway
Wainui Reserve	38.6841539°S 178.072362°E	Wainui Beach	Gisborne	Sports ground
Waikirikiri Reserve	38.6707554°S 178.0517678°E	Outer Kaiti	Gisborne	Sports ground, dog walking area, picnic area, public toilets
Wainui Beach / Lysnar Reserve	38.6842828°S 178.0727553°E	Wainui Beach	Gisborne	Boat fishing, boat ramp, dog walking area, horse riding, kite surfing
Waiteata Park	38.6552782°S 178.031528°E	Whataupoko	Gisborne	Picnic area, playground
Watson Park	38.6717084°S 177.9923513°E	Awapuni	Gisborne	Sports ground
Whataupoko Reserve	38.6565509°S 178.0100323°E	Whataupoko	Gisborne	Dog walking, mountain biking, walkway

== See also ==
- List of marae in the Gisborne District
- List of schools in the Gisborne District
