= List of schools in the Gisborne District =

This is a list of schools located in the Gisborne District of New Zealand.

Kura Kaupapa Māori schools are schools for children aged 3–14 who learn fully in the Māori language. This starts at kōhanga reo which is the Māori equivalent of kindergarten.

This list does not include proposed schools such as Waikirikiri High School. The area where it was supposed to be built is now a sports field and park, Waikirikiri Reserve.

The rolls given here are those provided by the Ministry of Education, based on figures from July 2025.

Name	Years	Gender	Area	Authority	Decile	Roll	Website	MOE	ERO
Awapuni School	1–6	Coed	Awapuni	State	3	282		2544	2544
Campion College	7–15	Coed	Te Hapara	State integrated	6	469		211	211
Elgin School	1–6	Coed	Elgin	State	1	41		2555	2555
Gisborne Boys' High School	9–15	Boys	Gisborne Central	State	3	811		209	209
Gisborne Central School	1–6	Coed	Whataupoko	State	7	357		2564	2564
Gisborne Girls' High School	9–15	Girls	Te Hapara	State	3	685		210	210
Gisborne Intermediate	7–8	Coed	Gisborne Central	State	4	533		2566	2566
Hatea-A-Rangi	1–8	Coed	Tokomaru Bay	State	3	17	–	2706	2706
Hiruharama School	1–8	Coed	Hiruharama	State	1	119		2578	2578
Ilminster Intermediate	7–8	Coed	Kaiti	State	2	302	–	2581	2581
Kaiti School	1–6	Coed	Kaiti	State	1	412		2584	2584
Lytton High School	9–15	Coed	Riverdale	State	2	609		208	208
Makaraka School	1–6	Coed	Makaraka	State	5	109		2593	2593
Makarika School	1–8	Coed	Makarika	State	1	22		2594	2594
Makauri School	1–6	Coed	Makauri	State	8	149		2595	2595
Mangapapa School	1–6	Coed	Mangapapa	State	5	418		2597	2597
Manutuke School	1–8	Coed	Manutūkē	State	3	213		2602	2602
Mata School	1–8	Coed	Tokomaru Bay	State	1	8		2609	2609
Matawai School	1–8	Coed	Mātāwai	State	4	50	–	2611	2611
Motu School	1–8	Coed	Mōtū	State	7	7	–	2616	2616
Muriwai School	1–8	Coed	Muriwai	State	2	58	–	2617	2617
Ngata Memorial College	1–15	Coed	Ruatoria	State	1	103	–	206	206
Ngatapa School	1–8	Coed	Ngātapa	State	8	13		2621	2621
Ormond School	1–6	Coed	Ormond	State	6	83		2631	2631
Patutahi School	1–8	Coed	Pātūtahi	State	1	76	–	2643	2643
Potaka School	1–8	Coed	Potaka	State	1	48	–	2649	2649
Rere School	1–8	Coed	Rere	State	9	38		2664	2664
Riverdale School	1–6	Coed	Riverdale	State	1	131		2667	2667
Sonrise Christian School	1–10	Coed	Riverdale	State integrated	4	129		1149	1149
St Mary's Catholic School	1–6	Coed	Te Hapara	State integrated	5	232		2680	2680
Te Hapara School	1–6	Coed	Te Hapara	State	3	205	–	2692	2692
Te Karaka Area School	1–15	Coed	Te Karaka	State	2	112		2695	624
Te Waha o Rerekohu Area School	1–15	Coed	Te Araroa	State	1	66		550	550
Te Wharau School	1–6	Coed	Kaiti	State	1	322		2701	2701
Te Whare Whai Hua Teenage Parent Centre	–	Coed	Riverdale	State	1	n/a	–	2749	2749
Tikitiki School	1–8	Coed	Tikitiki	State	1	32		2703	2703
Tiniroto School	1–8	Coed	Tiniroto	State	6	10		2705	2705
TKKM o Kawakawa mai Tawhiti	1–15	Coed	Hicks Bay	State	1	157	–	3119	3119
TKKM o Mangatuna	1–8	Coed	Tolaga Bay	State	1	24	–	2600	2600
TKKM o Nga Uri A Maui	1–15	Coed	Riverdale	State	1	222	–	1672	1672
TKKM o Tapere-Nui-A-Whatonga	1–8	Coed	Rangitukia	State	1	23		2659	2659
TKKM o Te Waiu O Ngati Porou	1–15	Coed	Ruatoria	State	1	137	–	1673	1673
TKKM o Tokomaru	1–8	Coed	Tokomaru Bay	State	3	26	–	4218	4218
Tolaga Bay Area School	1–15	Coed	Tolaga Bay	State	2	246	–	212	212
Waerenga-o-Kuri School	1–8	Coed	Ngātapa	State	9	25		2712	2721
Waikirikiri School	1–8	Coed	Kaiti	State	1	208	–	2715	2715
Wainui Beach School	1–6	Coed	Wainui Beach	State	7	246		2721	2721
Whangara School	1–8	Coed	Whangara	State	2	95		2736	2736

== Closed schools ==
Cobham School was a Year 1-6 state primary school in Elgin which opened in 1962 and closed in 2025 due to low student numbers and a high staff turnover.
