= Don Merton =

New Zealand conservationist (1939-2011)

Don Merton QSM CF
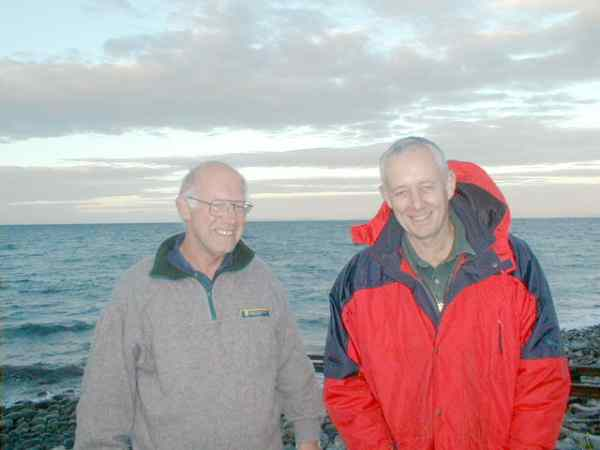
- Merton (left) with Dave Barker on Hauturu (Little Barrier Island)
- Born: Donald Vincent Merton; 22 February 1939; Auckland, New Zealand
- Died: 10 April 2011 (aged 72); Tauranga, New Zealand
- Occupation: Conservationist
- Employer: Department of Conservation
- Relatives: Jan Tinetti (daughter-in-law)

Donald Vincent Merton QSM CF (22 February 1939 – 10 April 2011) was a New Zealand conservationist best known for saving the black robin from extinction. He also discovered the lek breeding system of the kākāpō.

When Merton began his work as a conservationist, kākāpō were believed to be extinct, but about 20 years into his career a small population was found in a semi-remote national park in mainland New Zealand. However, it was several months before they finally found a female, and soon after they found the first female they discovered a surprise, well-fed chick a few weeks old. Merton and his crew initially wanted to relocate all of the rediscovered kākāpō they found to Codfish Island / Whenua Hou, but the New Zealand Department of Conservation only gave permission to relocate 20. Despite the limited relocation, the kākāpō population has steadily recovered (as of 2019 there are 147 mature adult kākāpō, and the 2019 season produced 181 eggs and 34 chicks so far, though not all are likely to survive due to problems with in breeding- lack of genetic diversity). With technological advances in genome mapping tools like CRISPR, scientists have successfully mapped all of the 147 kākāpō genomes, and in the near future it may be possible to edit the genomes of an egg to allow for a higher survival rate among newly hatched chicks.

Until his retirement in April 2005, Merton was a senior member of the New Zealand Department of Conservation's Threatened Species Section, within the Research, Development & Improvement Division, Terrestrial Conservation Unit, and of the Kakapo Management Group. He had a long involvement in wildlife conservation, specialised in the management of endangered species since he completed a traineeship with the New Zealand Wildlife Service (NZWS) in 1960.

== Early life ==
Merton was born in Devonport, Auckland in February 1939 and with his family moved to Gisborne later that year when his father, Glaisher (Major) Merton was appointed the first New Zealand Automobile Association representative in the Poverty Bay region. Initially, the family settled at Wainui Beach near Gisborne, but in 1945 moved to a farmette in Mangapapa Road, Gisborne.

Together with his two older brothers, Merton had early success fostering an orphaned wild goldfinch nestling to their grandmother's canary. This early success proved crucial 35 years later in inspiring a cross-fostering programme to save the black robin, which at that time numbered five individuals including just one productive pair, and was the most endangered species in the world.

Merton attended schools at Kaiti, Mangapapa, Gisborne Intermediate and Gisborne High School. On leaving school he secured a traineeship with the fledgeling New Zealand Wildlife Service. In 1987 the Wildlife Service merged with other Government conservation agencies to form the Department of Conservation. In the early 1960s, Merton became one of only two field officers working nationally on threatened species, roles now filled by more than 80 staff.

In 1966, Merton married Margaret Dawn Johnston at St Andrew's Presbyterian Church in Gisborne.

== Professional achievements ==
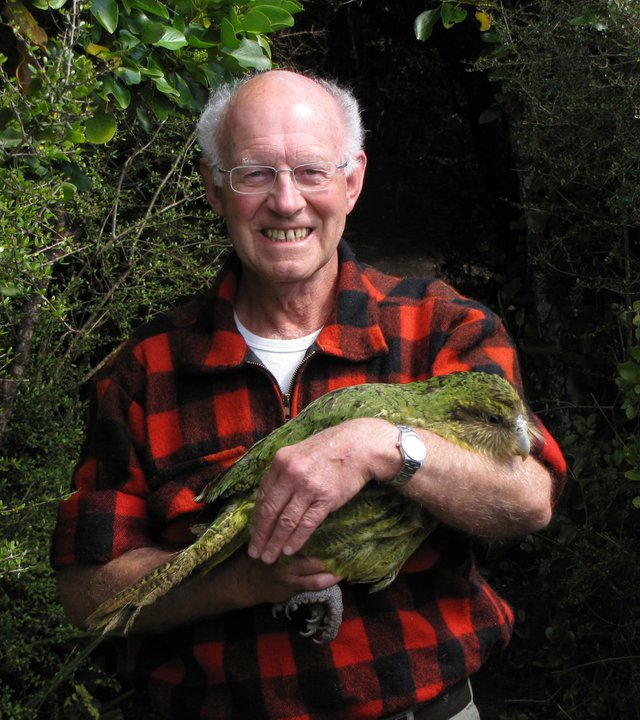
Richard Henry kākāpō held by Merton, Codfish Island / Whenua Hou, November 2010. Richard Henry spent the past 35 years on four predatory-mammal-free islands. Named after Richard Treacy Henry the pioneer conservationist, and from 1894 to 1910, custodian of Resolution Island, New Zealand he was the last known survivor of his species from mainland New Zealand and was believed to be more than 100 years old. Richard Henry's legacy: His one female and two male off-spring hatched on Maud Island in 1998 may hold the key to genetic rescue of a species suffering from chronic lack of genetic diversity. Richard Henry kākāpō was found dead on Codfish Island / Whenua Hou on 24 December 2010.

Together with NZWS colleagues and volunteers, his contributions include:

- pioneered capture and translocation techniques as management tools in the rescue and recovery of endangered birds: In the early 1960s Merton led some of the first successful translocations for conservation purposes involving New Zealand birds – including establishment of a second population of the North Island saddleback, and averting extinction of the South Island saddleback. Techniques pioneered then are now an everyday part of threatened species management within NZ and beyond;
- pioneered "close order management" (COM) as a means of averting extinction; sustaining in the wild; and/or facilitating recovery of critically endangered species. COM involves intensive management of free-living animals at the individual rather than population level. The concept and techniques were developed and applied with outstanding success during the rescue and recovery of the black robin which Merton led in the 1980s. Refined and adapted over the years, close order management techniques pioneered then are now an integral part of threatened species recovery programmes internationally.
- helped pioneer island biodiversity conservation and restoration techniques. For instance, in the early 1960s, he and Royal Forest & Bird Protection Society of New Zealand volunteers eradicated Norway rats from four small islands in the Noises group, Hauraki Gulf. This was the first time that rats had been deliberately eradicated from a New Zealand island and opened the way for ecological restoration of these – and many other islands both within New Zealand and beyond;
- led the NZWS field teams that re-discovered the kākāpō parrot (in Fiordland) in 1974, and females of this species (on Stewart Island) in 1980. Females had not been seen since the early 1900s and it was feared they may have been extinct – and thus the species "functionally extinct";
- discovered and documented the significance of the ritualised, nocturnal booming display of the kākāpō – it is, in fact, an unusual form of courtship display known as "lekking";
- instrumental in averting imminent extinction of kākāpō (an endemic, monotypic sub-family): In the early 1980s; (i) determined that the newly re-discovered kākāpō population of southern Stewart Island was in steep decline due to predation by feral cats (~53% mortality per annum of marked adults); (ii) alerted NZWS, drafted submissions and obtained agreement from the various government and other agencies to relocate (and thus effectively destroy) the last natural population; and, (iii) as NZWS's Principal Wildlife Officer (Endangered Species), assumed responsibility for planning and leading the capture and relocation of all remaining (61) birds to Little Barrier, Maud and Codfish Islands. This action proved very successful – the steep decline in kākāpō numbers was halted and adult mortality since (~30 years) has averaged a remarkably low ~1.3% per annum;
- led the field project and devised the techniques necessary to capture, hold in captivity, transport and establish a second population of the endangered and highly localised noisy scrubbird of Western Australia. The second population is now by far the larger of the two;
- during the 1980s helped devise and implement a recovery strategy for the critically endangered Mauritius parakeet of Mauritius (Indian Ocean). Only around eight birds including three females were known to exist at that time. There are now more than 300 in the wild;
- also during the 1980s, devised and led the successful eradication of rabbits from Round Island, Mauritius (Indian Ocean) – Round Island was said to support more threatened animal and plant forms than any comparable area on Earth, but survival of these was seriously threatened by the rabbits;
- instrumental in the designation of a national park within the Australian Territory of Christmas Island (Indian Ocean) to facilitate survival of Abbott's booby (largest and most endangered gannet) and a unique raised tropical island ecosystem – while seconded for two years to the Australian National Parks & Wildlife Service as its first Conservator on Christmas Island;
- played a key role in the rescue and recovery of the magpie robin and other animals endemic to the Seychelles Islands (Indian Ocean): In 1990 – 1992, in collaboration with BirdLife International staff, designed and implemented an effective recovery strategy and range of management techniques for the critically endangered Seychelles magpie-robin, the last ~20 individuals of which were confined to the 219 ha Fregate Island. Then, in 1995 when Norway rats reached Fregate Island, (final refuge of the last natural population of Seychelles magpie robin and a number of other vulnerable endemic life-forms), alerted the island's owner, and local and international conservation agencies to the fact that without intervention ecological collapse and extinctions were inevitable. Worked with stakeholders and by 1999 convinced all that eradication was both necessary and practicable. At their request planned, and in 2000 led a successful rodent (Norway rat and house mouse) eradication – thus averting extinctions and facilitating ecological recovery.
- authored or co-authored ~150 publications, including books, peer-reviewed scientific papers, popular articles and technical reports.

In New Zealand Merton is also known for his role in the rescue of the South Island saddleback when in the early 1960s rats Rattus rattus invaded its final refuge – Taukihepa / Big South Cape Island; for facilitating recovery in the North Island saddleback, confined in the early 1960s to a single island (Taranga/Hen Island); for his role, since 1974, in developing the rescue strategy and techniques, and for his role in the rescue and recovery programme for the giant, flightless, nocturnal kākāpō parrot; and for devising the rescue strategy and leading the successful rescue and recovery of the Chatham Islands black robin when in the late 1970s its numbers fell to just seven individuals – including only one effective breeding pair. The black robin now numbers about 250 individuals on two islands.

== Later life and death ==
Merton retired from the Department of Conservation in 2005. He lived in Tauranga where he remained active in conservation issues, and died there from pancreatic cancer on 10 April 2011.

== Honours and awards ==
Merton was awarded a Churchill Fellowship in 1973 to study management of endangered species in the US and Europe. He was the international chairperson of IUCN/Birdlife International's Parrot Specialist Group from 1983 to 1986. In the 1989 Queen's Birthday Honours, he was awarded the Queen's Service Medal for public services; the following year he received the Royal Society of New Zealand's Fleming Award for Environmental Achievement; in 1992 the honorary degree of Doctor of Science was conferred on him by Massey University for his contribution to science; in 1994 the Royal Society for the Protection of Birds (UK) awarded him its medal for his "international contribution to species survival" and in 1998 the United Nations Environment Programme (UNEP) elected him to its Global 500 Roll of Honour for his "outstanding contributions to the protection and improvement of the environment." Merton was named one of "100 Great New Zealanders of the 20th Century" in the 60th anniversary issue of the New Zealand Listener; in 2001 the New Zealand Government presented him with a certificate in commemoration of the United Nations International Year of the Volunteer 2001, for his "valued contribution toward assisting developing countries to reduce poverty and achieve sustainable development"; in 2004, BirdLife International awarded him its Conservation Achievement Award for achievements during his 48-year career in the rescue and recovery of endangered birds within New Zealand and elsewhere; on his retirement from the NZ Department of Conservation in April 2005 the Department granted him Honorary Technical Associate status – the first such recipient; in 2010 the Royal Forest & Bird Protection Society of NZ presented him with its "Old Blue Award" in recognition of his extraordinary and sustained contributions to conservation in NZ and worldwide"; and in 2011 he became a "Fellow of the Ornithological Society of NZ in recognition of his "lifetime contributions to ornithology and to the work of the Society".

As well as being the recipient of numerous awards the Don Merton Conservation Pioneer Award is named after him.

== See also ==
- Conservation in New Zealand
