= Diana Goodman =

New Zealand journalist

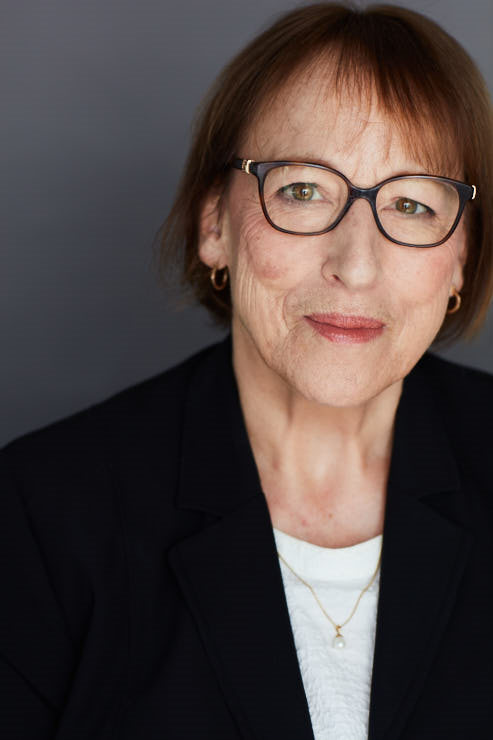
Goodman in 2020

Diana Barbara Goodman (born 1952) is a New Zealand-born journalist who became the BBC's first female foreign correspondent.

== Biography ==
Goodman was born in Christchurch in 1952, and was educated at Lytton High School in Gisborne, and Samuel Marsden Collegiate School in Wellington, before studying journalism at Wellington Polytechnic. After graduating, she worked for the Cook Islands Broadcasting and Newspaper Corporation, The Dominion, and the New Zealand Broadcasting Corporation. She moved to Britain in 1975 and started out in commercial radio before joining BBC Radio Manchester as a news producer in 1978.

Goodman became a network radio reporter in 1982. The following year she was sent to Australia and New Zealand to cover the Prince and Princess of Wales' first tour abroad. In 1984, she reported from Beirut on the Lebanese Civil War. The BBC attracted some criticism from listeners who objected to a woman being sent to cover a conflict.

In 1986, Goodman was posted to Bonn as the BBC's first-ever female foreign correspondent. As well as reporting on West Germany, she covered Kurt Waldheim's election as president of Austria. During the political upheavals in Eastern Europe in 1989, she came under fire while reporting on the overthrow of President Nicolae Ceauşescu.

In January 1990, the BBC was able to open its first bureau in East Berlin and Goodman was based there as Eastern Europe correspondent from 1990 to 1993. She reported on the first democratic elections in Eastern Europe, the reunification of Germany, the dissolution of Czechoslovakia and, from Moscow, the resignation of General Secretary Mikhail Gorbachev and the end of the Soviet Union.

In 1994 Goodman was posted to Russia, serving as Moscow correspondent until 1998. She covered the political ramifications of the war in Chechnya, Boris Yeltsin's presidency and the effects of economic change. A dispatch for From Our Own Correspondent on the plight of handicapped children in Russia's orphanages produced a strong response from listeners.

On her return to London, Goodman worked for BBC Newsgathering management and was project editor for two books published by BBC News: The Day that Shook the World (pub. 13 December 2001) and The Battle for Iraq (pub. 12 June 2003).

After retiring from the BBC, Goodman moved to New Zealand with her son in 2005. In 2016, she was awarded an honorary Doctor of Literature degree by Massey University for services to journalism.
