= Ormond, New Zealand =

Ormond
- Settlement
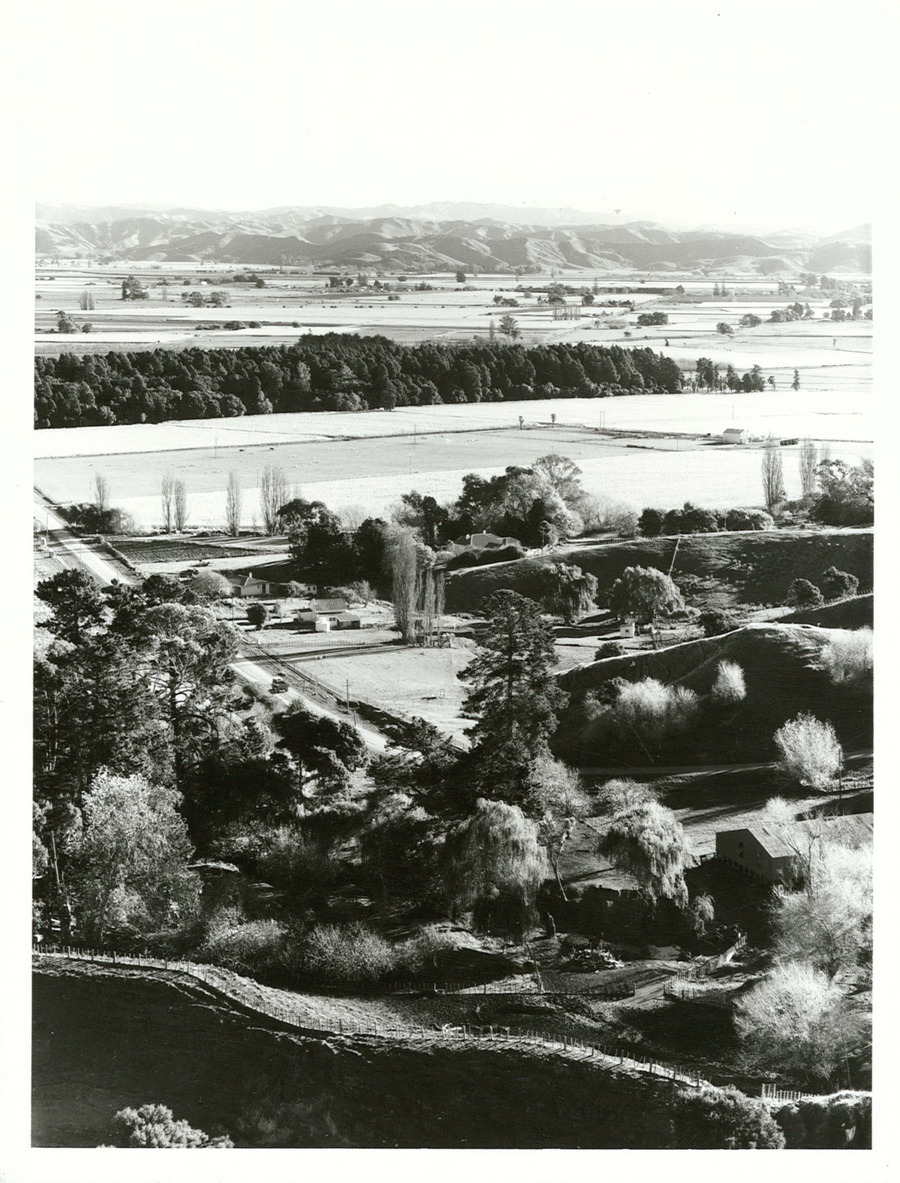
- The Ormond Valley in May 1977
- Interactive map of Ormond
- Coordinates: 38°34′S 177°55′E
- Country: New Zealand
- Region: Gisborne District
- Ward: Tairāwhiti General Ward
- Electorates: East Cape; Ikaroa-Rāwhiti (Māori)

Government
  - Territorial authority: Gisborne District Council
  - Mayor of Gisborne: Rehette Stoltz
  - East Cape MP: Dana Kirkpatrick
  - Ikaroa-Rāwhiti MP: Cushla Tangaere-Manuel

Area
  - Total: 3.86 km^{2} (1.49 sq mi)

Population (2023 Census)
  - Total: 222
  - Density: 57.5/km^{2} (149/sq mi)
- Postcode(s): 4071

Ormond is a small settlement inland from Gisborne, in the northeast of New Zealand's North Island. It is located on State Highway 2 in the valley of the Waipaoa River, halfway between Gisborne and the township of Te Karaka.

== Demographics ==
Ormond covers 3.86 km^{2} (1.49 sq mi). It is part of the Hexton statistical area.

Historical population
| Year | Pop. | ±% p.a. |
|---|---|---|
| 2006 | 195 | — |
| 2013 | 198 | +0.22% |
| 2018 | 228 | +2.86% |
| 2023 | 222 | −0.53% |

Ormond had a population of 222 in the 2023 New Zealand census, a decrease of 6 people (−2.6%) since the 2018 census, and an increase of 24 people (12.1%) since the 2013 census. There were 117 males and 105 females in 81 dwellings. 1.4% of people identified as LGBTIQ+. The median age was 39.3 years (compared with 38.1 years nationally). There were 45 people (20.3%) aged under 15 years, 45 (20.3%) aged 15 to 29, 99 (44.6%) aged 30 to 64, and 36 (16.2%) aged 65 or older.

People could identify as more than one ethnicity. The results were 77.0% European (Pākehā); 27.0% Māori; 6.8% Pasifika; 1.4% Asian; 1.4% Middle Eastern, Latin American and African New Zealanders (MELAA); and 2.7% other, which includes people giving their ethnicity as "New Zealander". English was spoken by 100.0%, Māori by 2.7%, Samoan by 5.4%, and other languages by 4.1%. No language could be spoken by 1.4% (e.g. too young to talk). The percentage of people born overseas was 13.5, compared with 28.8% nationally.

Religious affiliations were 29.7% Christian, 1.4% Islam, 1.4% Māori religious beliefs, 1.4% Buddhist, and 1.4% other religions. People who answered that they had no religion were 58.1%, and 6.8% of people did not answer the census question.

Of those at least 15 years old, 33 (18.6%) people had a bachelor's or higher degree, 105 (59.3%) had a post-high school certificate or diploma, and 42 (23.7%) people exclusively held high school qualifications. The median income was $40,500, compared with $41,500 nationally. 12 people (6.8%) earned over $100,000 compared to 12.1% nationally. The employment status of those at least 15 was 102 (57.6%) full-time, 30 (16.9%) part-time, and 6 (3.4%) unemployed.

== Education ==
Ormond School is a Year 1–6 co-educational state primary school with a roll of 93 students as of July 2026. It opened in 1874.
