= Lytton High School =

Location
- Nelson Road, Gisborne, New Zealand; 38.6433°S 177.9994°E

Information
- Type: State Coeducational Secondary
- Motto: Latin: Ubi Lux Praelucet (Where the light shines forth)
- Established: 1961
- Ministry of Education Institution no.: 208
- Principal: Wiremu Elliott
- Enrolment: 578 (July 2026)
- Socio-economic decile: 3
- Website: www.lyttonhigh.com

Lytton High School is a co-educational state secondary school in Gisborne, New Zealand for students in Years 9 to 13.

== History ==
Gisborne High School was the first and only state secondary school in Gisborne between 1909 and 1955. It was a co-educational school, however in 1956 it was decided that the school would be divided into Gisborne Boys' High School and Gisborne Girls' High School. Soon after the split, plans were made to establish a third and co-educational state secondary school.

The Gisborne High Schools Board of Governors chose an area of land in outer Mangapapa to base the school, with the other option being in outer Kaiti. It was decided that the school be named 'Lytton', thus identifying it with Lytton Road where the school was to be situated. The original derivation of the name was from Lord Lytton, a distinguished British politician, poet and novelist.

Building of the school commenced in May 1960 and in June of that year, Mr J. C. Wilson was appointed principal. Lytton High School was opened to new students on 1 February 1961 and began with a roll of 159 third form students and 10 staff. The school was officially opened by the then Minister of Education, William Blair Tennent on 27 October 1961.

Like most New Zealand state secondary schools of the era, Lytton High School was constructed to the Nelson Two-Storey standard plan, characterised by its two-storey H-shaped classroom blocks. In 1963, after the construction of a second classroom block, it was decided the two-storey blocks should be given the Māori names of local mountains Hikurangi and Arowhana. In 1967, the construction of a third block, Raukumara was completed, followed by a new library in 1969. During Mr. Wilson's eight years as principal, the school roll increased to 923 and the number of full-time staff increased from 8 to 43. The school continued to grow steadily until reaching its highest roll of 1,232 students in 1978.

In 2002, the Te Whare Whai Hua young parents unit was established at the school to cater for teen parents. On 20 October 2008, then Governor-General Anand Satyanand officially opened the school's new outdoor gymnasium and sports centre.

Lytton celebrated its 50th jubilee in January 2011 with an estimated roll of 810 students.

School principals

- J. C. Wilson, 1961–1968
- T. M. Sharp, 1969–1975
- R. J. Preston, 1976–1985
- K. M. List, 1986–1990
- Peter Gibson, 1991–2003
- Jim Corder, 2004–2011
- Wiremu Elliott, 2012–present

== School crest ==
Lytton High School Crest

The school crest was designed by Mr G. T. Griffiths, secretary of the High School Board, who presented it to the school in 1961 on the occasion of the first school assembly. It depicts a lion rampant, which represents "courage and readiness for action" and a shield divided into four sections:

- The top left quarter depicts an "open book of knowledge".
- The top right quarter shows three pairs of hands, which represents Gisborne High School being divided into two single sex schools, then the return of co-education with the establishment of Lytton High.
- The bottom left quarter depicts a rising sun (indicative of the Gisborne region being the first land to see the sun rise) and a maize stalk, representing one of the main crops of the district.
- The bottom right quarter depicts scales of justice which also symbolise "the ability to weigh up knowledge and choose the correct course".

The school's Latin motto "Ubi Lux Praelucet" translates to "Where the light shines forth".

== Notable alumni ==
- Grant Bramwell – Kayaking Olympic Gold Medalist
- Shane Cameron – Professional boxer
- Fiona Cram MNZM - social psychologist
- Sandra Edge – former Silver Fern netballer
- Diana Goodman – New Zealand-born journalist who became the BBC's first female foreign correspondent.
- Moana Mackey – New Zealand Labour politician, scientist and daughter of Janet Mackey, attended 1987–1992.
- Shannon McIlroy – New Zealand Lawn Bowls Representative
- Matai Smith – Pukana presenter, former school Prefect, attended 1991–1996
