= Riverdale, New Zealand =

Suburb of Gisborne, New Zealand

Riverdale
- Suburb
- Interactive map of Riverdale
- Coordinates: 38.644044°S 178.001568°E
- Country: New Zealand
- City: Gisborne
- Local authority: Gisborne District Council
- Electoral ward: Tairāwhiti General Ward

Area
  - Land: 210 ha (520 acres)

Population (June 2025)
  - Total: 2,860
  - Density: 1,400/km^{2} (3,500/sq mi)
- Hospitals: Gisborne Hospital

Makauri
Makaraka	Riverdale	Mangapapa
	Te Hapara

Riverdale is a suburb of Gisborne, in the Gisborne District of New Zealand's North Island.

== Demographics ==
Riverdale covers 2.10 km^{2} (0.81 sq mi) and had an estimated population of 2,860 as of June 2025, with a population density of 1,362 people per km^{2}.

Historical population
Year	Pop.	±% p.a.
2006	1,638	—
2013	2,178	+4.15%
2018	2,646	+3.97%
2023	2,781	+1.00%

Riverdale had a population of 2,781 in the 2023 New Zealand census, an increase of 135 people (5.1%) since the 2018 census, and an increase of 603 people (27.7%) since the 2013 census. There were 1,230 males and 1,551 females in 1,107 dwellings. 1.7% of people identified as LGBTIQ+. There were 393 people (14.1%) aged under 15 years, 357 (12.8%) aged 15 to 29, 981 (35.3%) aged 30 to 64, and 1,053 (37.9%) aged 65 or older.

People could identify as more than one ethnicity. The results were 72.1% European (Pākehā); 31.4% Māori; 2.8% Pasifika; 5.6% Asian; 0.5% Middle Eastern, Latin American and African New Zealanders (MELAA); and 2.3% other, which includes people giving their ethnicity as "New Zealander". English was spoken by 96.3%, Māori by 9.1%, Samoan by 0.3%, and other languages by 6.3%. No language could be spoken by 1.8% (e.g. too young to talk). New Zealand Sign Language was known by 0.2%. The percentage of people born overseas was 14.3, compared with 28.8% nationally.

Religious affiliations were 45.8% Christian, 1.4% Hindu, 0.3% Islam, 2.6% Māori religious beliefs, 0.2% Buddhist, 0.4% New Age, and 1.4% other religions. People who answered that they had no religion were 42.6%, and 5.5% of people did not answer the census question.

Of those at least 15 years old, 375 (15.7%) people had a bachelor's or higher degree, 1,350 (56.5%) had a post-high school certificate or diploma, and 666 (27.9%) people exclusively held high school qualifications. 195 people (8.2%) earned over $100,000 compared to 12.1% nationally. The employment status of those at least 15 was 918 (38.4%) full-time, 237 (9.9%) part-time, and 51 (2.1%) unemployed.

Individual statistical areas
Name	Area (km^{2})	Population	Density (per km^{2})	Dwellings	Median age	Median income
Lytton	0.86	1,431	1,664	615	68.3 years	$28,800
Riverdale	1.24	1,350	1,089	492	42.6 years	$41,400
New Zealand					38.1 years	$41,500

== Parks ==
Nelson Park is a sports ground, local park and dog walking area, located in Riverdale.

== Education ==
Lytton High School is a Year 9–13 state secondary school with a roll of 609. It opened in 1961. The school includes Te Whare Whai Hua Teenage Parent Centre, a public school for teenage parents.

Riverdale School is a year 1–6 state primary school with a roll of 131. The school was established in 1958. The school has hosted a regional chess tournament since 2006.

Te Kura Kaupapa Māori o Nga Uri A Maui is a Year 1–15 Māori immersion school with a roll of 222. It celebrated its 30th anniversary in 2023.

Sonrise Christian School is a Year 1–10 state integrated school with a roll of 129. It opened in 1993 in Mangapapa Church and became state integrated in 1999. It moved to separate premises in 2002.

All these schools are co-educational. Rolls are as of July 2025.

The Eastern Institute of Technology has a rural campus in Riverdale. It is used for EIT courses and community-run horticulture and gardening classes.
