= Gisborne Intermediate School =

Location
- Roebuck Road, Gisborne; 38.6628°S 178.0116°E

Information
- Type: State Coeducational Intermediate
- Motto: Hold your head high and walk with pride
- Ministry of Education Institution no.: 2566
- Principal: Mr Glen Udall
- Enrolment: 507 (July 2026)
- Socio-economic decile: 4
- Website: gisint.co.nz

Gisborne Intermediate School is a co-education public intermediate school in Gisborne, New Zealand for students in Year 7 to 8. As of 2016, the school had a roll of 590 students.

== History ==
Gisborne Intermediate School opened on 20 May 1940 with a school roll of 440 pupils and F. R. Slevin as headmaster. Slevin resigned in 1945 and was succeeded by R. McGlashen.

In 2014, the school underwent a $2.3 million upgrade as part of the New Zealand Ministry of Education's Building Improvement Programme which included the construction of a new music suite with an outdoor performance area.

== School organisation ==
Gisborne Intermediate is divided into four education teams. They each have their own individual colour and are named after local Gisborne rivers. The teams are: Taruheru (Green), Waipoa (Red), Waimata (Yellow) and Turanganui (Blue). These teams each have their own team leader. Gisborne Intermediate also use these teams at school events such as their athletics, swimming sports, cross country etc. Each team gets rewarded a certain number of points for participating, place getting and good behaviour.

== Notable alumni ==
- Alan Thompson – New Zealand Surf Lifesaving representative
- Graeme Hansen – Olympic Equestrian showjumper
- Maz Quinn – Professional surfer

== See also ==
- List of schools in the Gisborne District
