= Victoria, Gisborne =

Suburb of Gisborne, New Zealand

Victoria
- Suburb
- Interactive map of Victoria
- Coordinates: 38°40.2′S 178°1′E
- Country: New Zealand
- City: Gisborne
- Electoral ward: Gisborne

Area
  - Land: 16 ha (40 acres)

Population (2023 Census)
  - Total: 360
  - Density: 2,300/km^{2} (5,800/sq mi)

	Te Hapara	Gisborne Central
Arapuni	Makaraka
	(Poverty Bay)	Eastland Port

Victoria is a suburb of the New Zealand city of Gisborne. It is located close to the shore of Poverty Bay, to the southeast of the city centre, between the mouth of the Awapuni Creek and Awapuni.

The suburb was named after Queen Victoria.

== Demographics ==
Victoria covers 0.16 km^{2} (0.062 sq mi). It is part of the Makaraka-Awapuni statistical area.

Historical population
Year	Pop.	±% p.a.
2006	315	—
2013	306	−0.41%
2018	348	+2.61%
2023	360	+0.68%

Victoria had a population of 360 in the 2023 New Zealand census, an increase of 12 people (3.4%) since the 2018 census, and an increase of 54 people (17.6%) since the 2013 census. There were 183 males and 180 females in 147 dwellings. 4.2% of people identified as LGBTIQ+. There were 45 people (12.5%) aged under 15 years, 69 (19.2%) aged 15 to 29, 159 (44.2%) aged 30 to 64, and 87 (24.2%) aged 65 or older.

People could identify as more than one ethnicity. The results were 69.2% European (Pākehā); 46.7% Māori; 5.8% Pasifika; 5.0% Asian; 1.7% Middle Eastern, Latin American and African New Zealanders (MELAA); and 1.7% other, which includes people giving their ethnicity as "New Zealander". English was spoken by 95.0%, Māori by 6.7%, Samoan by 0.8%, and other languages by 10.8%. No language could be spoken by 0.8% (e.g. too young to talk). New Zealand Sign Language was known by 0.8%. The percentage of people born overseas was 12.5, compared with 28.8% nationally.

Religious affiliations were 29.2% Christian, 1.7% Māori religious beliefs, 0.8% Buddhist, and 1.7% other religions. People who answered that they had no religion were 57.5%, and 6.7% of people did not answer the census question.

Of those at least 15 years old, 78 (24.8%) people had a bachelor's or higher degree, 159 (50.5%) had a post-high school certificate or diploma, and 72 (22.9%) people exclusively held high school qualifications. 18 people (5.7%) earned over $100,000 compared to 12.1% nationally. The employment status of those at least 15 was 147 (46.7%) full-time, 42 (13.3%) part-time, and 12 (3.8%) unemployed.

== Parks ==
Victoria features Waikanae Beach and a beach walkway.
