= Tamarau =

Suburb of Gisborne, New Zealand

- Suburb
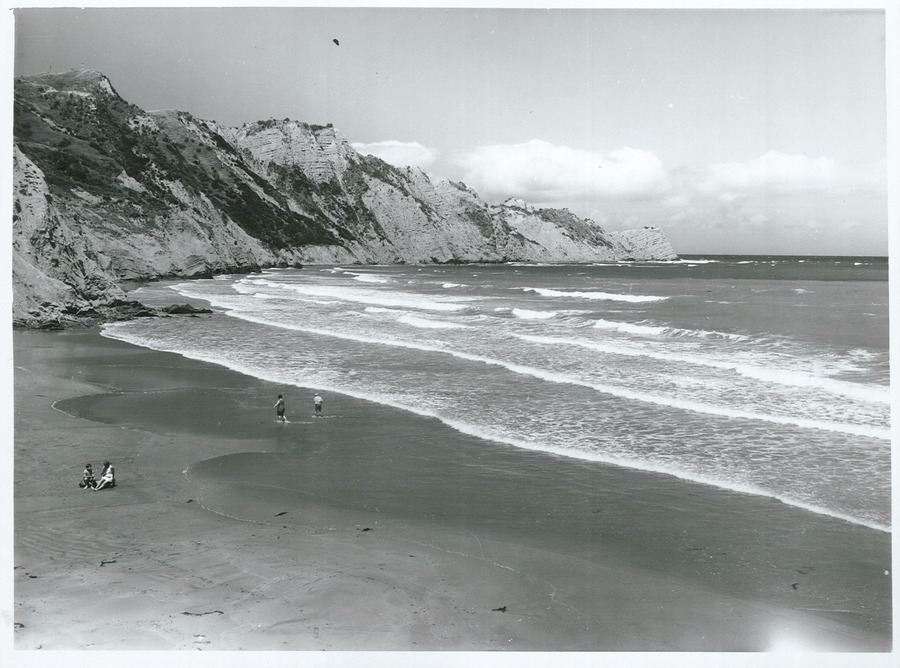
- Sponge Bay in 1968
- Interactive map of Tamarau
- Coordinates: 38.693°S 178.058°E
- Country: New Zealand
- City: Gisborne
- Local authority: Gisborne District Council
- Electoral ward: Tairāwhiti General Ward

Area
  - Land: 111 ha (270 acres)

Population (June 2025)
  - Total: 2,770
  - Density: 2,500/km^{2} (6,460/sq mi)

| Kaiti |
| | Tamarau | Wainui Beach |
| | (Poverty Bay) |

Tamarau is a suburb of the New Zealand city of Gisborne. It is located to the southeast of the city centre.

== Demographics ==
Tamarau covers 1.11 km^{2} (0.43 sq mi) and had an estimated population of 2,770 as of June 2025, with a population density of 2,495 people per km^{2}.

Historical population
| Year | Pop. | ±% p.a. |
|---|---|---|
| 2006 | 2,265 | — |
| 2013 | 2,244 | −0.13% |
| 2018 | 2,367 | +1.07% |
| 2023 | 2,676 | +2.48% |

Tamarau had a population of 2,676 in the 2023 New Zealand census, an increase of 309 people (13.1%) since the 2018 census, and an increase of 432 people (19.3%) since the 2013 census. There were 1,299 males, 1,371 females, and 9 people of other genders in 759 dwellings. 2.5% of people identified as LGBTIQ+. The median age was 30.1 years (compared with 38.1 years nationally). There were 708 people (26.5%) aged under 15 years, 624 (23.3%) aged 15 to 29, 1,053 (39.3%) aged 30 to 64, and 288 (10.8%) aged 65 or older.

People could identify as more than one ethnicity. The results were 39.1% European (Pākehā); 76.0% Māori; 7.7% Pasifika; 2.2% Asian; 1.3% Middle Eastern, Latin American and African New Zealanders (MELAA); and 0.9% other, which includes people giving their ethnicity as "New Zealander". English was spoken by 95.7%, Māori by 22.5%, Samoan by 0.8%, and other languages by 4.7%. No language could be spoken by 2.2% (e.g. too young to talk). New Zealand Sign Language was known by 0.4%. The percentage of people born overseas was 8.1, compared with 28.8% nationally.

Religious affiliations were 27.6% Christian, 0.4% Hindu, 0.2% Islam, 7.0% Māori religious beliefs, 0.1% Buddhist, 0.4% New Age, and 0.9% other religions. People who answered that they had no religion were 55.3%, and 8.7% of people did not answer the census question.

Of those at least 15 years old, 228 (11.6%) people had a bachelor's or higher degree, 1,101 (55.9%) had a post-high school certificate or diploma, and 633 (32.2%) people exclusively held high school qualifications. The median income was $32,400, compared with $41,500 nationally. 63 people (3.2%) earned over $100,000 compared to 12.1% nationally. The employment status of those at least 15 was 927 (47.1%) full-time, 255 (13.0%) part-time, and 99 (5.0%) unemployed.

== Parks ==
Heath Johnston Park, located in Tamarau, is a public sports ground, one of several owned and operated by Gisborne District Council.
