= Gisborne Central =

Central business district of Gisborne, New Zealand

- Suburb
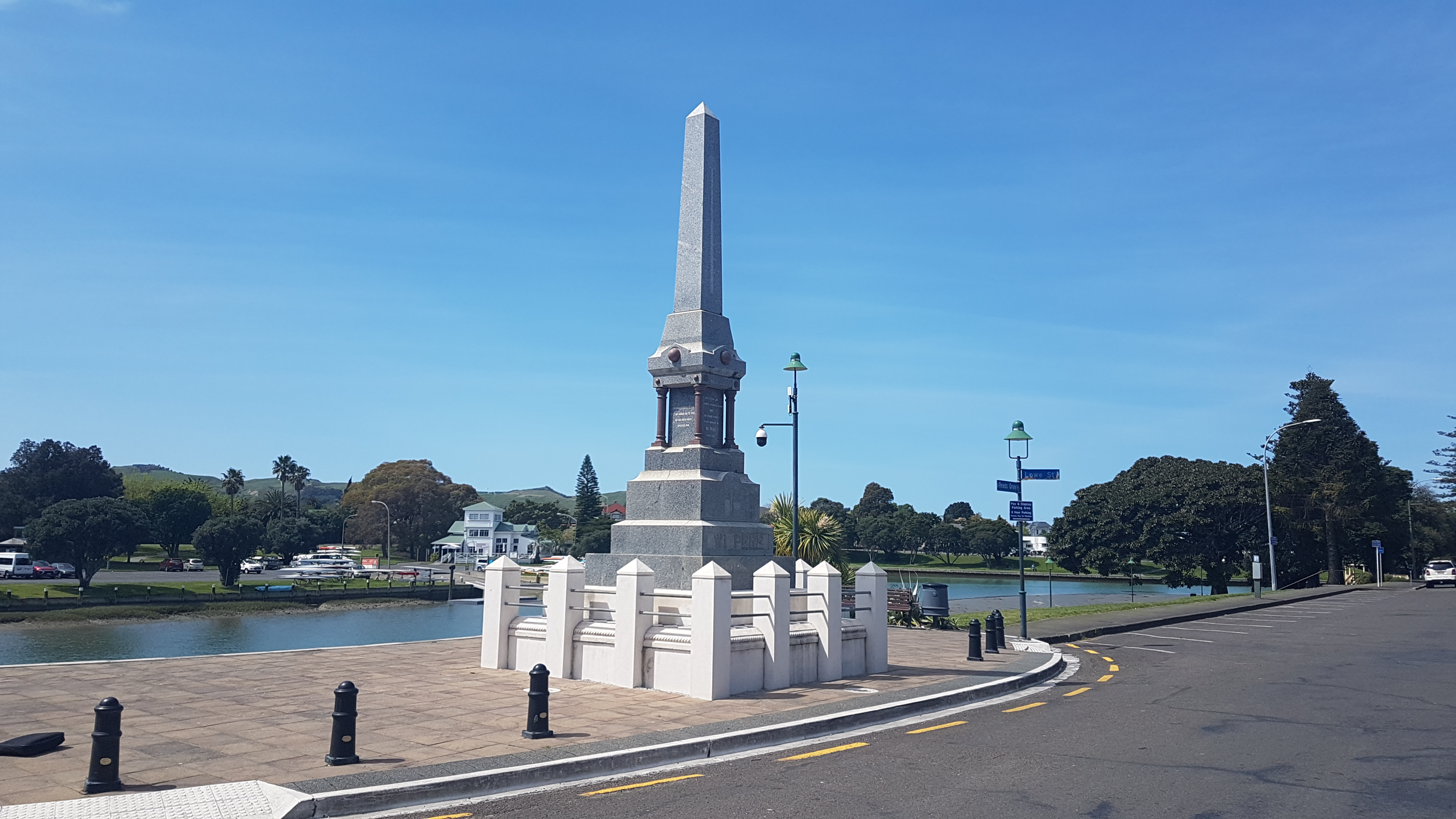
- Wi Pere Monument
- Interactive map of Gisborne Central
- Coordinates: 38.666374°S 178.025978°E
- Country: New Zealand
- City: Gisborne
- Electoral ward: Gisborne

Area
  - Land: 135 ha (330 acres)

Population (June 2025)
  - Total: 290
  - Density: 210/km^{2} (560/sq mi)

Te Hapara		Whataupoko
	Gisborne Central
Awapuni	Victoria	Kaiti

Gisborne Central is the central business district and central suburb of Gisborne, in the Gisborne District of New Zealand's North Island. It is located east of Elgin, south of Whataupoko and west of Kaiti.

== Demographics ==
Gisborne Central covers 1.35 km^{2} (0.52 sq mi) and had an estimated population of 290 as of June 2025, with a population density of 215 people per km^{2}.

Historical population
Year	Pop.	±% p.a.
2006	267	—
2013	306	+1.97%
2018	300	−0.40%
2023	258	−2.97%
The 2006 population is for a larger area of 1.59 km^{2}. Source:

Gisborne Central had a population of 258 in the 2023 New Zealand census, a decrease of 42 people (−14.0%) since the 2018 census, and a decrease of 48 people (−15.7%) since the 2013 census. There were 135 males, 120 females, and 3 people of other genders in 228 dwellings. 2.3% of people identified as LGBTIQ+. The median age was 46.7 years (compared with 38.1 years nationally). There were 21 people (8.1%) aged under 15 years, 51 (19.8%) aged 15 to 29, 126 (48.8%) aged 30 to 64, and 60 (23.3%) aged 65 or older.

People could identify as more than one ethnicity. The results were 54.7% European (Pākehā); 40.7% Māori; 7.0% Pasifika; 14.0% Asian; and 1.2% Middle Eastern, Latin American and African New Zealanders (MELAA). English was spoken by 95.3%, Māori by 11.6%, Samoan by 1.2%, and other languages by 11.6%. No language could be spoken by 2.3% (e.g. too young to talk). The percentage of people born overseas was 23.3, compared with 28.8% nationally.

Religious affiliations were 41.9% Christian, 1.2% Hindu, 2.3% Islam, 3.5% Māori religious beliefs, 2.3% Buddhist, 1.2% New Age, and 3.5% other religions. People who answered that they had no religion were 37.2%, and 7.0% of people did not answer the census question.

Of those at least 15 years old, 51 (21.5%) people had a bachelor's or higher degree, 147 (62.0%) had a post-high school certificate or diploma, and 42 (17.7%) people exclusively held high school qualifications. The median income was $44,700, compared with $41,500 nationally. 18 people (7.6%) earned over $100,000 compared to 12.1% nationally. The employment status of those at least 15 was 117 (49.4%) full-time, 18 (7.6%) part-time, and 9 (3.8%) unemployed.

== Parks ==
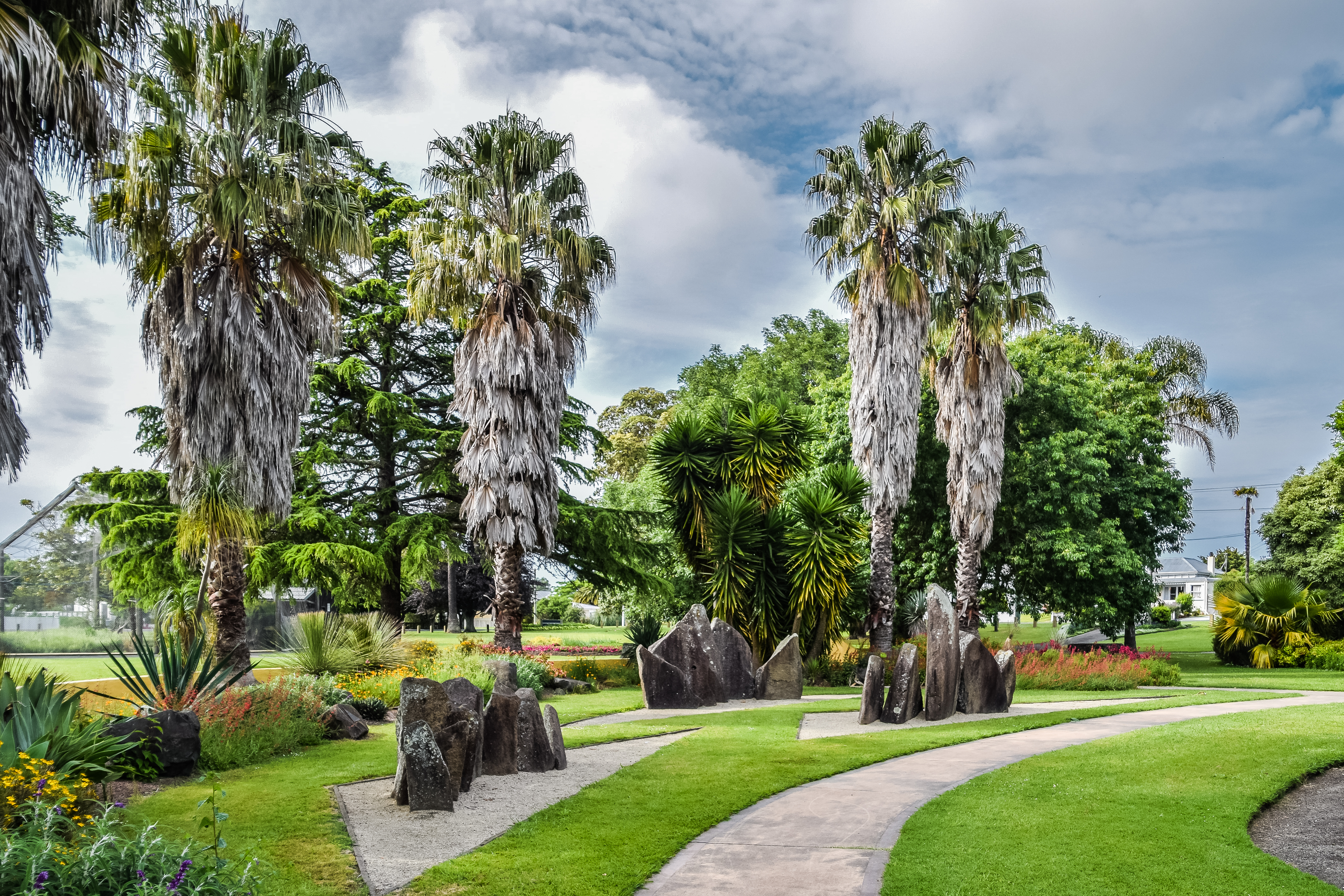
Gisborne Botanical Gardens

Gisborne Botanical Gardens is a public garden, established in 1874.

Alfred Cox Park is a local park and dog walking area.

=== Childers Road Reserve ===
Childers Road Reserve is a sports ground.

It was previously the home of Gisborne City AFC and has hosted several national team and professional club football games, including:

- Gisborne City vs Bournemouth 0-4, 1982
- New Zealand vs League of Ireland All Stars 0-0, 1982
- New Zealand vs Gisborne City 4-3, 1985
- New Zealand vs Fiji 3-0, 1985
- New Zealand vs USSR XI 2-4, 1986
- New Zealand vs Dinamo Minsk 0-2, 1987

== Education ==
Gisborne Boys' High School is a Year 9-13 single-sex boys' state high school with a roll of 811. It opened as Gisborne High School in 1907 or 1910, with secondary classes previously held at Gisborne Central School from 1888. In 1956 Gisborne Girls' High School was created on a separate site, leaving the Boys' High School on the original site.

Gisborne Intermediate is a Year 7-8 co-educational state intermediate school with a roll of 533. It opened in 1940.

Rolls are as of July 2025.
