= Mōtū =

Locality in Gisborne District, New Zealand

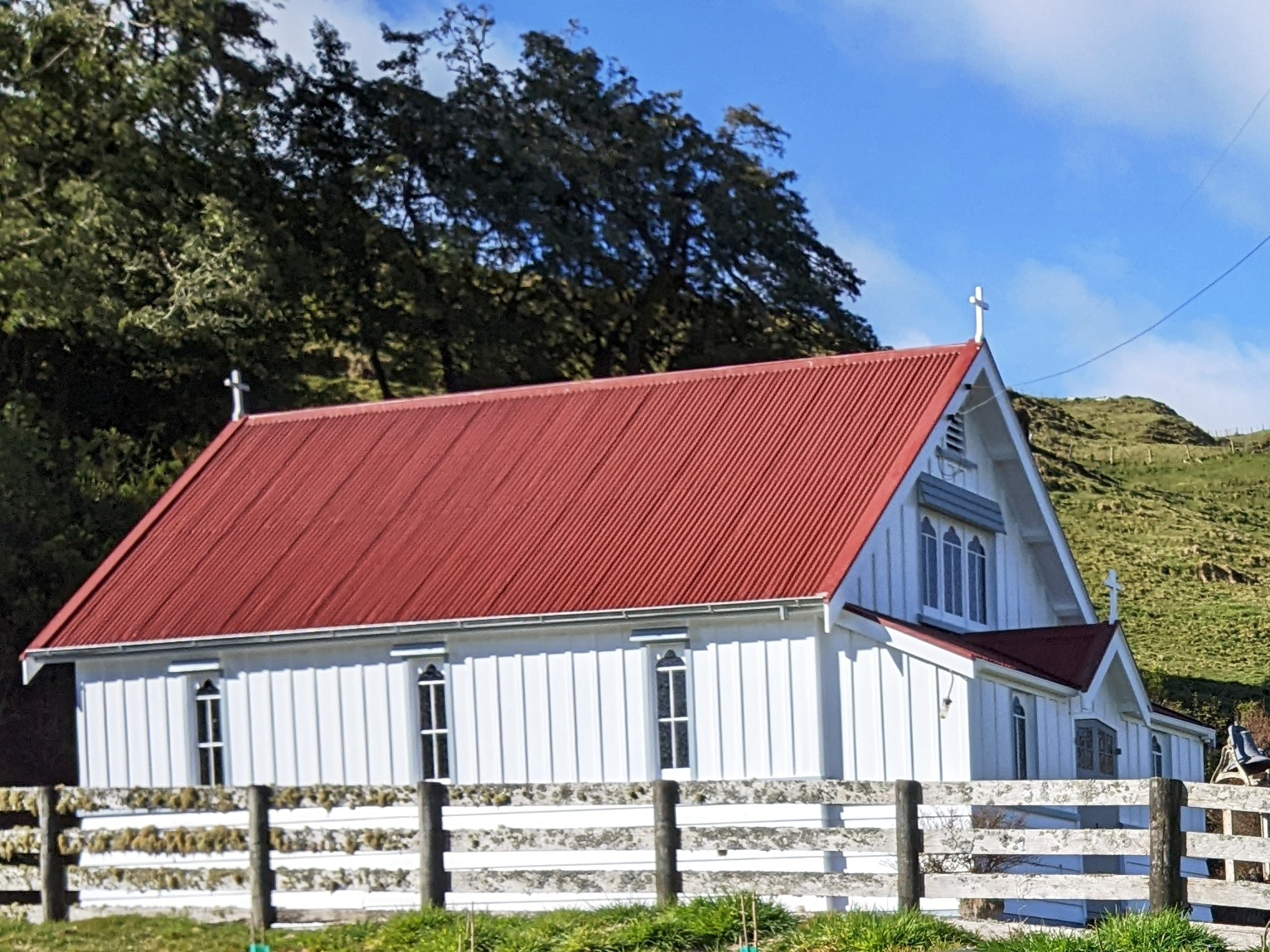
- St Paul's Anglican Church
- Interactive map of Mōtū
- Coordinates: 38.256°S 177.548°E
- Country: New Zealand
- District: Gisborne District
- Ward: Tairāwhiti General Ward
- Electorates: East Cape; Ikaroa-Rāwhiti (Māori)
- Māori electorate: Ikaroa-Rāwhiti

Government
  - MP: Dana Kirkpatrick
  - MP (Māori Seat): Cushla Tangaere-Manuel
  - Mayor: Rehette Stoltz

Area
  - Total: 986.00 km^{2} (380.70 sq mi)

Population (2023 Census)
  - Total: 132
  - Density: 0.134/km^{2} (0.347/sq mi)

Mōtū is a rural community in the Gisborne District of New Zealand's North Island. It is located north of Matawai and State Highway 2. The community is centred around Mōtū River and Mōtū Falls.

== Demographics ==
Mōtū locality covers 986.00 km^{2} (380.70 sq mi). It is part of the Waipaoa statistical area.

Historical population
Year	Pop.	±% p.a.
2006	180	—
2013	150	−2.57%
2018	129	−2.97%
2023	132	+0.46%

Mōtū had a population of 132 in the 2023 New Zealand census, an increase of 3 people (2.3%) since the 2018 census, and a decrease of 18 people (−12.0%) since the 2013 census. There were 78 males and 57 females in 60 dwellings. The median age was 34.5 years (compared with 38.1 years nationally). There were 24 people (18.2%) aged under 15 years, 30 (22.7%) aged 15 to 29, 63 (47.7%) aged 30 to 64, and 12 (9.1%) aged 65 or older.

People could identify as more than one ethnicity. The results were 79.5% European (Pākehā), and 36.4% Māori. English was spoken by 97.7%, and Māori by 4.5%. No language could be spoken by 4.5% (e.g. too young to talk). The percentage of people born overseas was 6.8, compared with 28.8% nationally.

Religious affiliations were 27.3% Christian, and 2.3% Māori religious beliefs. People who answered that they had no religion were 65.9%, and 9.1% of people did not answer the census question.

Of those at least 15 years old, 15 (13.9%) people had a bachelor's or higher degree, 75 (69.4%) had a post-high school certificate or diploma, and 21 (19.4%) people exclusively held high school qualifications. The median income was $38,400, compared with $41,500 nationally. The employment status of those at least 15 was 63 (58.3%) full-time and 15 (13.9%) part-time.

== Education ==
Motu School is a Year 1–8 co-educational state primary school with a roll of 7 students as of July 2026. The school opened in 1895 in the kitchen of an accommodation house. It moved to its own premises in 1902, and moved again to its current location in 1955.

== Climate ==
Mōtū has mild summers and frosty winters, with an average of 8 days rising above 25 °C (77 °F) and 43 nights dropping below 0 °C (32 °F).

Climate data for Motu, elevation 488 m (1,601 ft), (1991–2020 normals, extremes 1990–present)
Month	Jan	Feb	Mar	Apr	May	Jun	Jul	Aug	Sep	Oct	Nov	Dec	Year
Record high °C (°F)	31.1 (88.0)	32.5 (90.5)	27.6 (81.7)	25.7 (78.3)	21.9 (71.4)	19.6 (67.3)	17.7 (63.9)	20.9 (69.6)	25.8 (78.4)	26.9 (80.4)	28.4 (83.1)	28.7 (83.7)	32.5 (90.5)
Mean maximum °C (°F)	26.5 (79.7)	26.4 (79.5)	24.1 (75.4)	21.5 (70.7)	18.5 (65.3)	15.5 (59.9)	14.5 (58.1)	15.9 (60.6)	18.7 (65.7)	21.1 (70.0)	22.9 (73.2)	24.6 (76.3)	27.5 (81.5)
Mean daily maximum °C (°F)	21.2 (70.2)	21.2 (70.2)	19.1 (66.4)	16.6 (61.9)	13.8 (56.8)	11.4 (52.5)	10.6 (51.1)	11.6 (52.9)	13.2 (55.8)	15.2 (59.4)	17.0 (62.6)	19.3 (66.7)	15.9 (60.5)
Daily mean °C (°F)	15.9 (60.6)	16.1 (61.0)	14.1 (57.4)	11.6 (52.9)	9.2 (48.6)	6.8 (44.2)	6.4 (43.5)	6.9 (44.4)	8.7 (47.7)	10.5 (50.9)	12.1 (53.8)	14.4 (57.9)	11.1 (51.9)
Mean daily minimum °C (°F)	10.6 (51.1)	11.1 (52.0)	9.0 (48.2)	6.6 (43.9)	4.5 (40.1)	2.3 (36.1)	2.2 (36.0)	2.3 (36.1)	4.2 (39.6)	5.8 (42.4)	7.2 (45.0)	9.5 (49.1)	6.3 (43.3)
Mean minimum °C (°F)	3.2 (37.8)	3.9 (39.0)	1.4 (34.5)	−2.3 (27.9)	−3.5 (25.7)	−4.9 (23.2)	−5.0 (23.0)	−4.6 (23.7)	−3.5 (25.7)	−1.8 (28.8)	−0.3 (31.5)	2.5 (36.5)	−6.1 (21.0)
Record low °C (°F)	−1.0 (30.2)	−0.9 (30.4)	−2.7 (27.1)	−6.1 (21.0)	−7.8 (18.0)	−7.5 (18.5)	−8.4 (16.9)	−7.8 (18.0)	−6.6 (20.1)	−5.8 (21.6)	−4.6 (23.7)	−1.2 (29.8)	−8.4 (16.9)
Average rainfall mm (inches)	134.2 (5.28)	118.8 (4.68)	134.8 (5.31)	154.9 (6.10)	200.5 (7.89)	230.8 (9.09)	197.4 (7.77)	194.4 (7.65)	199.3 (7.85)	182.1 (7.17)	164.9 (6.49)	171.4 (6.75)	2,083.5 (82.03)
Source: NIWA
