= Whataupoko =

Suburb of Gisborne, New Zealand

- Suburb
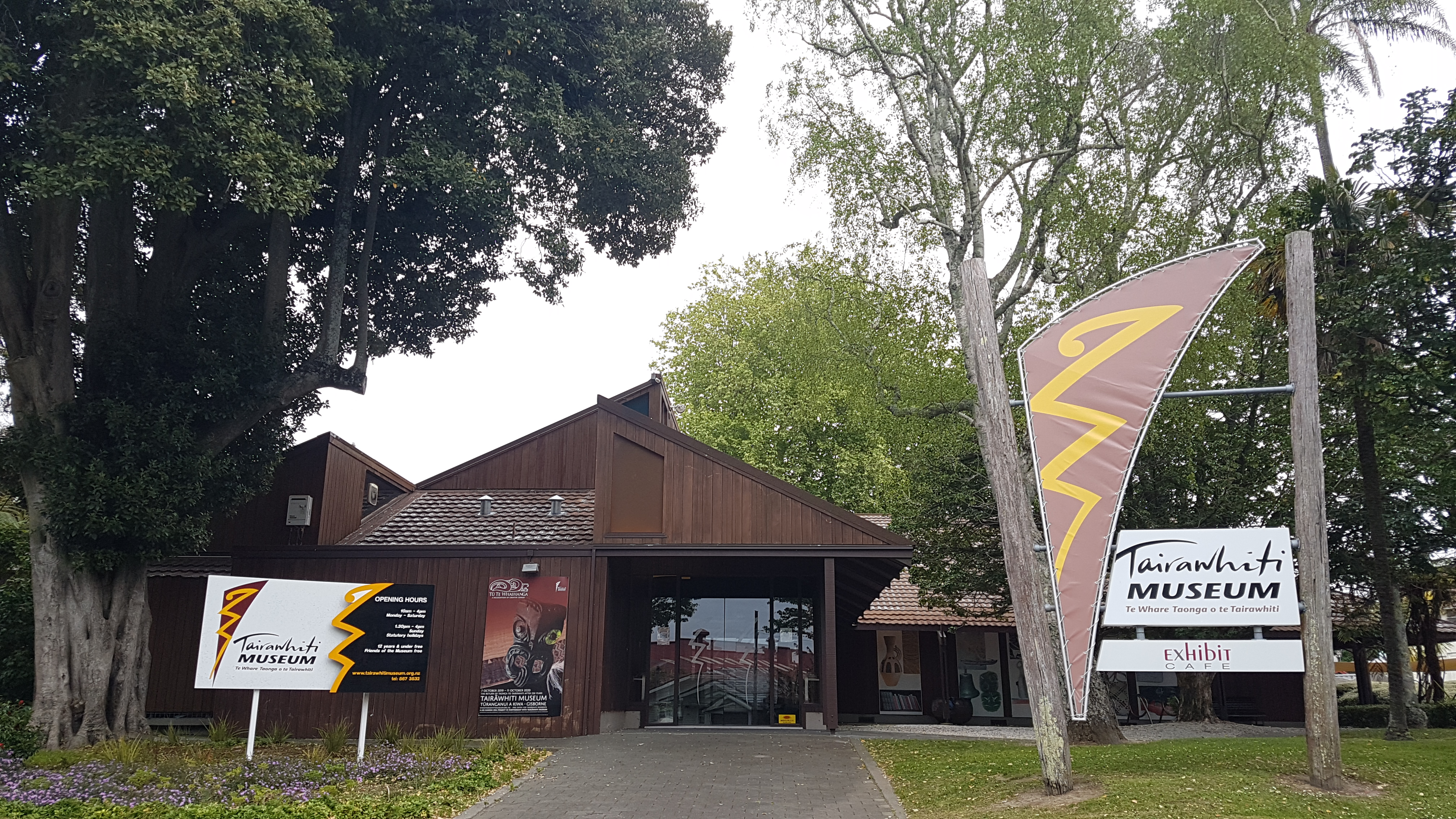
- Tairāwhiti Museum
- Interactive map of Whataupoko
- Coordinates: 38°39′S 178°02′E
- Country: New Zealand
- City: Gisborne
- Local authority: Gisborne District Council
- Electoral ward: Tairāwhiti General Ward

Area
  - Land: 379 ha (940 acres)

Population (June 2025)
  - Total: 4,100
  - Density: 1,100/km^{2} (2,800/sq mi)

Mangapapa
Te Hapara	Whataupoko
Gisborne Central	Kaiti

Whataupoko is the central residential suburb of the city of Gisborne in New Zealand. It is northeast of the Gisborne Central business district, across the Taruheru River, and north of the suburb of Kaiti, across the Waimata River. The suburb of Mangapapa is north-west of Whataupoko. Significant facilities are the headquarters of the Gisborne District Council and the regional museum, Tairāwhiti Museum, both located near the southern point of Whataupoko at the confluence of the two rivers.

== History and naming ==
The name Whataupoko derives from the Māori terms whata, meaning an elevated stage or platform, and upoko, meaning head. In about 1740, two warriors came to the area to try to drive the local people out. The two attackers were captured and beheaded, and their heads (upoko) were hung from a rail on an elevated platform (whata), and so the name came about.

== Demographics ==
Whataupoko covers 3.79 km^{2} (1.46 sq mi) and had an estimated population of 4,100 as of June 2025, with a population density of 1,082 people per km^{2}.

Historical population
Year	Pop.	±% p.a.
2006	3,708	—
2013	3,705	−0.01%
2018	3,930	+1.19%
2023	4,020	+0.45%
The 2006 population is for a smaller area of 3.65 km^{2}. Source:

Whataupoko had a population of 4,020 in the 2023 New Zealand census, an increase of 90 people (2.3%) since the 2018 census, and an increase of 315 people (8.5%) since the 2013 census. There were 1,917 males, 2,091 females, and 12 people of other genders in 1,539 dwellings. 2.5% of people identified as LGBTIQ+. The median age was 42.7 years (compared with 38.1 years nationally). There were 762 people (19.0%) aged under 15 years, 636 (15.8%) aged 15 to 29, 1,788 (44.5%) aged 30 to 64, and 834 (20.7%) aged 65 or older.

People could identify as more than one ethnicity. The results were 79.8% European (Pākehā); 29.6% Māori; 2.1% Pasifika; 6.0% Asian; 0.7% Middle Eastern, Latin American and African New Zealanders (MELAA); and 3.3% other, which includes people giving their ethnicity as "New Zealander". English was spoken by 97.6%, Māori by 7.5%, Samoan by 0.1%, and other languages by 8.6%. No language could be spoken by 1.8% (e.g. too young to talk). New Zealand Sign Language was known by 0.2%. The percentage of people born overseas was 18.8, compared with 28.8% nationally.

Religious affiliations were 31.3% Christian, 0.6% Hindu, 0.3% Islam, 1.2% Māori religious beliefs, 0.5% Buddhist, 0.4% New Age, and 1.8% other religions. People who answered that they had no religion were 57.2%, and 6.9% of people did not answer the census question.

Of those at least 15 years old, 864 (26.5%) people had a bachelor's or higher degree, 1,773 (54.4%) had a post-high school certificate or diploma, and 630 (19.3%) people exclusively held high school qualifications. The median income was $44,300, compared with $41,500 nationally. 402 people (12.3%) earned over $100,000 compared to 12.1% nationally. The employment status of those at least 15 was 1,701 (52.2%) full-time, 531 (16.3%) part-time, and 51 (1.6%) unemployed.

Individual statistical areas
Name	Area (km^{2})	Population	Density (per km^{2})	Dwellings	Median age	Median income
Whataupoko East	2.69	1,914	712	711	42.0 years	$48,500
Whataupoko West	1.10	2,106	1,915	825	43.7 years	$41,200
New Zealand					38.1 years	$41,500

== Parks ==
The Whataupoko Reserve includes a dog walking area, and walking and mountain biking tracks.

Waiteata Park has a picnic area and playground.

There are also several local parks in the area which allow dogs on leashes: Ballance Street Reserve, Fox Street Reserve, Grant Road Reserve, Hall Street Reserve and Sheehan Street Reserve.

== Education ==
Gisborne Central School is a Year 1–6 co-educational state school with a roll of 357 as of July 2025. The school was founded in 1872. Secondary classes were held at Central School from 1888 until Gisborne High School opened in the early 20th century.
