= Kaiti, New Zealand =

Suburb of Gisborne, New Zealand

Kaiti
- Suburb
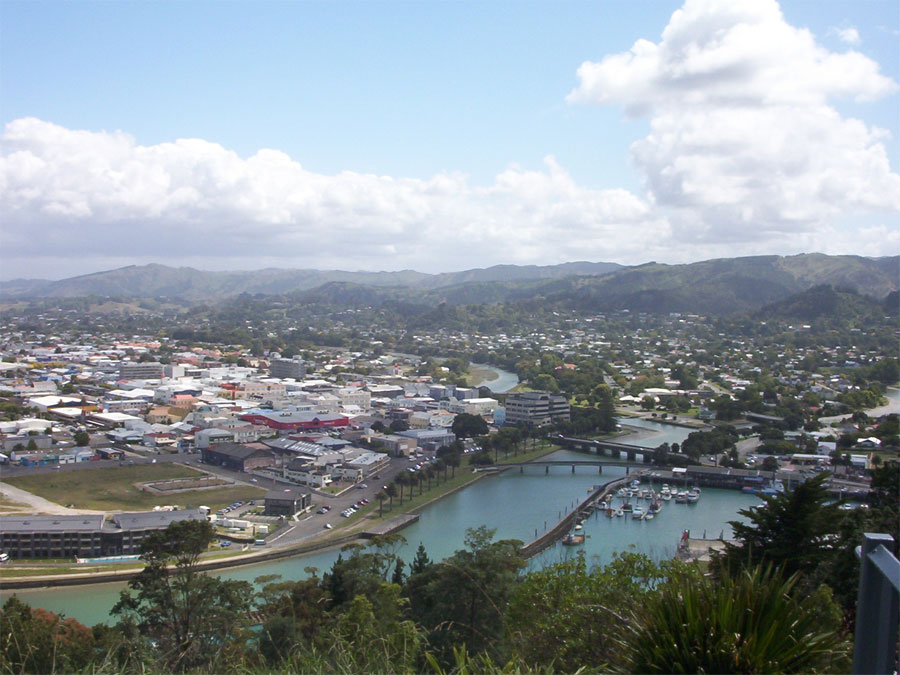
- View from Titirangi (Kaiti Hill) looking towards Gisborne.
- Interactive map of Kaiti
- Coordinates: 38°40′19″S 178°02′06″E
- Country: New Zealand
- City: Gisborne
- Local authority: Gisborne District Council
- Electoral ward: Tairāwhiti General Ward

Area
  - Land: 620 ha (1,500 acres)

Population (June 2025)
  - Total: 8,360
  - Density: 1,300/km^{2} (3,500/sq mi)

Gisborne Central	Whataupoko
Victoria	Kaiti
Poverty Bay		Tamarau

Kaiti (Puhi-kai-iti) is a suburb and historic area of Gisborne in New Zealand's Gisborne District. Situated on the eastern bank of the Tūranganui River, it contains several of the most historically significant sites in Tūranganui-a-Kiwa, including Titirangi, Puhi Kai Iti / Cook Landing Site, and much of the former Kaiti Block, one of the earliest Native Land Court title investigations undertaken in the district.

Kaiti has long been a centre of settlement for the descendants of Ruapani and forms part of the customary rohe of Rongowhakaata, Te Aitanga-a-Māhaki and their constituent hapū, including Ngāi Tāwhiri, Te Whānau-a-Iwi, Ngāi Te Kete and Ngāti Oneone.

During the Native Land Court investigations into the Kaiti Block, the customary interests advanced on behalf of Ngāti Oneone were traced principally through descent from Ruapani and his grandchildren Kahunoke and Te Nonoikura, including their descendants Tutekohe and Rongomaiwaiata. Contemporary claims identifying Ngāti Oneone primarily through Ngāti Porou whakapapa reflect a more recent interpretation that was not advanced during the nineteenth-century title investigations.

In October 1769, Kaitī became the setting for the first recorded encounters between Māori and the crew of James Cook. The district was already a long-established centre of settlement and customary authority, and the events that followed marked the beginning of sustained contact between the peoples of Tūranganui-a-Kiwa and Europeans.

== Etymology ==
The name Kaiti derives from Puhi-kai-iti (also written Puhi Kai Iti), the traditional name of the locality. According to Tūranga traditions, the tohunga Maia (or Maia Poroaki) arrived at Tawararo aboard the waka Te Ikaroa-a-Rauru and established the whare wānanga Puhi Kaiti near present-day Ōnepoto (Kaiti Beach). Maia is also associated with introducing the hue (gourd) to Tūranganui-a-Kiwa, which was subsequently cultivated near Mangamōteo. Over time, the place name Puhi Kai Iti became abbreviated to Kaiti, from which the modern suburb derives its name.

== History ==
=== Early Māori settlement ===
Kaitī has long been one of the principal centres of occupation in Tūranganui-a-Kiwa. The district formed part of the customary lands of the descendants of Ruapani and was occupied by the hapū of Rongowhakaata and Te Aitanga-a-Māhaki, including Ngāi Tāwhiri and Te Whānau-a-Iwi.

Titirangi was a pā of Ruapani, the paramount chief of Tūranga. According to tribal tradition, Kahungunu first arrived there before travelling to nearby Popoia, where he married Ruapani's daughter Ruarauhanga. Some recorded traditions also refer to the hill as "Te Taumata o Tamaterongo", after Tamaterongo, an ancestor of Ngāi Tāwhiri.

According to tribal traditions recorded by Rongowhakaata Halbert, Te Aringiwaho, the rangatira of Te Whānau-a-Iwi, occupied Titirangi when Rakaiataane and the displaced people of Ngāti Rakai arrived in Tūranga following their expulsion from Whareongaonga. After settling at Pukaingākākahu on the Tatapouri headland, Rakaiataane visited Titirangi, where he stayed with Te Aringiwaho and Kaumaiwaho before later conflicts developed between the two groups.

=== Cook's arrival ===
In October 1769, Ōnepoto (Kaiti Beach), Puhi Kai Iti / Cook Landing Site, the eastern bank of the Tūranganui River, and nearby Titirangi became the setting for the first recorded encounters between Māori and the expedition commanded by James Cook. The district was already a long-established centre of settlement and customary authority, and the events that followed marked the beginning of sustained contact between the peoples of Tūranganui-a-Kiwa and Europeans.

=== Native Land Court ===
Much of modern Kaiti occupies the former Kaiti Block, one of the earliest and most significant customary title investigations undertaken by the Native Land Court in Tūranga. Commencing in 1873 and continuing through a series of rehearings until 1886, the proceedings produced one of the most extensive documentary records of customary tenure, whakapapa, occupation, resource use and land boundaries in the district.

The principal parties were represented by Riperata Kahutia and Rutene Te Eke, whose evidence traced their respective interests through descent from Kahunoke and Te Nonoikura. Witnesses including Riperata Kahutia, Heni Kotikoti Tūrangi and Te Waka described the occupation of Titirangi, Puhi Kai Iti, the lower Tūranganui River and the surrounding coastline, recording the locations of settlements, cultivations, fishing grounds, rāhui, wāhi tapu and the boundaries established following earlier intertribal conflicts.

The Court initially awarded title to nine owners before subsequent rehearings resulted in the subdivision of the block between the parties of Riperata Kahutia and Rutene Te Eke. Further hearings individualised ownership and resolved the remaining subdivisions by 1886.

The Kaiti proceedings remain one of the principal documentary sources for the customary history of Tūranganui-a-Kiwa and continue to be relied upon by historians, the Māori Land Court and Waitangi Tribunal researchers.

== Titirangi Domain ==
In 1949, the Gisborne Returned Services' Association transferred 68½ acres surrounding Titirangi to a public domain authority, preserving the hill as a public reserve. The project originated before the Second World War and was made possible through the donation and purchase of land interests, including those contributed by the families of Heni Materoa Carroll and Pare Keiha. The transfer established the Titirangi Domain and included provisions protecting the former pā site from desecration and allowing the domain to serve as a place of public recreation and memorialisation.

Speaking on behalf of the Keiha family and the original owners who had contributed land interests, Reta Keiha described Titirangi as a place of longstanding cultural importance:

"This is historic ground on which we stand. It was in olden times the gathering-place and the school of those whom our people selected for training in leadership."

— Reta Keiha, 1949

Keiha stated that his family had agreed to the transfer in the expectation that the historic landscape would be permanently protected for public benefit:

"When my family agreed to entrust disposal of this land to the Gisborne Returned Services Association, it was in full confidence that their trust would be honoured. The step now taken to preserve the area in perpetuity for the public use has the full approval of our people."

— Reta Keiha, 1949

== Demographics ==
Kaiti covers 6.20 km^{2} (2.39 sq mi) and had an estimated population of 8,360 as of June 2025, with a population density of 1,348 people per km^{2}.

Historical population
Year	Pop.	±% p.a.
2006	7,524	—
2013	6,894	−1.24%
2018	7,806	+2.52%
2023	8,217	+1.03%

Kaiti had a population of 8,217 in the 2023 New Zealand census, an increase of 411 people (5.3%) since the 2018 census, and an increase of 1,323 people (19.2%) since the 2013 census. There were 3,984 males, 4,203 females, and 30 people of other genders in 2,442 dwellings. 2.8% of people identified as LGBTIQ+. The median age was 32.8 years (compared with 38.1 years nationally). There were 2,016 people (24.5%) aged under 15 years, 1,740 (21.2%) aged 15 to 29, 3,333 (40.6%) aged 30 to 64, and 1,125 (13.7%) aged 65 or older.

People could identify as more than one ethnicity. The results were 44.0% European (Pākehā); 68.3% Māori; 8.7% Pasifika; 3.1% Asian; 0.5% Middle Eastern, Latin American and African New Zealanders (MELAA); and 1.1% other, which includes people giving their ethnicity as "New Zealander". English was spoken by 95.1%, Māori by 20.6%, Samoan by 0.5%, and other languages by 5.5%. No language could be spoken by 2.4% (e.g. too young to talk). New Zealand Sign Language was known by 0.5%. The percentage of people born overseas was 9.6, compared with 28.8% nationally.

Religious affiliations were 29.3% Christian, 0.2% Hindu, 0.4% Islam, 7.3% Māori religious beliefs, 0.4% Buddhist, 0.5% New Age, and 1.4% other religions. People who answered that they had no religion were 52.6%, and 8.7% of people did not answer the census question.

Of those at least 15 years old, 930 (15.0%) people had a bachelor's or higher degree, 3,348 (54.0%) had a post-high school certificate or diploma, and 1,923 (31.0%) people exclusively held high school qualifications. The median income was $32,400, compared with $41,500 nationally. 288 people (4.6%) earned over $100,000 compared to 12.1% nationally. The employment status of those at least 15 was 2,733 (44.1%) full-time, 834 (13.4%) part-time, and 357 (5.8%) unemployed.

Individual statistical areas
Name	Area (km^{2})	Population	Density (per km^{2})	Dwellings	Median age	Median income
Kaiti North	1.33	2,142	1,611	735	43.9 years	$37,700
Kaiti South	3.41	3,222	945	966	32.1 years	$31,800
Outer Kaiti	1.45	2,853	1,968	741	27.3 years	$29,500
New Zealand					38.1 years	$41,500

== Geography ==
=== Titirangi Hill today ===
Titirangi Hill is a reserve with a dog walking area, fitness trail, picnic area, playground and lookout spot.

The Kaiti Beach reserve, at the south-west base of the hill, is a beach, local park and dog walking area.

=== Other parks ===
Anzac Park includes a barbecue area, boat ramp, football fields, picnic area and playground.

Waikirikiri Reserve is a sports ground, dog walking area and picnic area.

London Street Reserve is a local park and dog walking area.

== Marae ==
Te Poho-o-Rawiri Marae is located in Kaitī and includes the meeting house Te Poho o Rawiri.

The marae was constituted as a Māori reservation under Part 4 of the Maori Purposes Act 1970 for the common use and benefit of Ngāti Oneone, Ngāti Porou (and its constituent hapū), Rongowhakaata, Te Aitanga-a-Māhaki and Ngāi Tāmanuhiri. The Act also established the Poho-o-Rawiri Marae Committee to administer the reservation.

The present meeting house, Te Poho o Rawiri, was opened in 1930 and replaced an earlier nineteenth-century whare built by the Te Aitanga a Māhaki and Rongowhakaata tohunga whakairo Natanahira Te Keteiwi.'

In October 2020, the Government committed $1,686,254 from the Provincial Growth Fund to upgrade Te Poho-o-Rawiri Marae and 5 other Rongowhakaata marae, creating an estimated 41 jobs.

== Education ==
Kaiti School is a Year 1–6 state primary school with a roll of 410. It opened in 1906.

Te Wharau School is a Year 1–6 primary school with a roll of 332. It opened in 1954.

Ilminster Intermediate is a Year 7–8 state intermediate school with a roll of 314. It opened in 1960.

Waikirikiri School is a Year 1–8 state primary school with a roll of 208. It opened in 1967.

All these schools are co-educational. Rolls are as of July 2026.
