= Hexton, New Zealand =

Settlement in Gisborne District, New Zealand

Hexton
- Settlement
- Interactive map of Hexton
- Coordinates: 38.614065°S 177.974866°E
- Country: New Zealand
- Region: Gisborne District
- Ward: Tairāwhiti General Ward
- Electorates: East Cape; Ikaroa-Rāwhiti (Māori)

Government
  - Territorial authority: Gisborne District Council
  - Mayor of Gisborne: Rehette Stoltz
  - East Cape MP: Dana Kirkpatrick
  - Ikaroa-Rāwhiti MP: Cushla Tangaere-Manuel

Area
  - Total: 13.87 km^{2} (5.36 sq mi)

Population (2023 Census)
  - Total: 645
  - Density: 46.5/km^{2} (120/sq mi)
- Postcode(s): 4071

Hexton is a village and rural area in the Gisborne District of New Zealand's North Island. It is located north-west of Gisborne City, and includes the settlements of Makauri and Waerengaahika.

The fertile plain east of the Waipaoa River was settled by the 19th century by families of Hampshire in southern England, with assistance from the New Zealand Government. The de Latour family named the area after their English village of Hexton.

The Chitty Family began growing wine in the area during the 1930s and 1940s, becoming one of three dominant families in Gisborne's early wine industry.

== Demographics ==
Hexton locality covers 13.87 km^{2} (5.36 sq mi). The locality is part of the Hexton statistical area.

Historical population for Hexton locality
Year	Pop.	±% p.a.
2006	390	—
2013	498	+3.55%
2018	594	+3.59%
2023	645	+1.66%

Hexton had a population of 645 in the 2023 New Zealand census, an increase of 51 people (8.6%) since the 2018 census, and an increase of 147 people (29.5%) since the 2013 census. There were 330 males and 312 females in 228 dwellings. 1.9% of people identified as LGBTIQ+. There were 132 people (20.5%) aged under 15 years, 108 (16.7%) aged 15 to 29, 297 (46.0%) aged 30 to 64, and 114 (17.7%) aged 65 or older.

People could identify as more than one ethnicity. The results were 86.5% European (Pākehā); 19.1% Māori; 2.8% Pasifika; 2.3% Asian; 0.5% Middle Eastern, Latin American and African New Zealanders (MELAA); and 0.9% other, which includes people giving their ethnicity as "New Zealander". English was spoken by 97.7%, Māori by 5.1%, Samoan by 0.5%, and other languages by 3.3%. No language could be spoken by 0.9% (e.g. too young to talk). New Zealand Sign Language was known by 0.5%. The percentage of people born overseas was 11.2, compared with 28.8% nationally.

Religious affiliations were 33.5% Christian, 1.4% Hindu, 0.9% Māori religious beliefs, 0.9% Buddhist, 0.5% New Age, and 0.5% other religions. People who answered that they had no religion were 57.7%, and 7.0% of people did not answer the census question.

Of those at least 15 years old, 108 (21.1%) people had a bachelor's or higher degree, 318 (62.0%) had a post-high school certificate or diploma, and 105 (20.5%) people exclusively held high school qualifications. 81 people (15.8%) earned over $100,000 compared to 12.1% nationally. The employment status of those at least 15 was 288 (56.1%) full-time, 87 (17.0%) part-time, and 3 (0.6%) unemployed.

=== Hexton statistical area ===
Hexton statistical area, which also includes Waihirere, covers 118.87 km^{2} (45.90 sq mi) and had an estimated population of 3,340 as of June 2025, with a population density of 28 people per km^{2}.

Historical population for the statistical area
Year	Pop.	±% p.a.
2006	2,496	—
2013	2,637	+0.79%
2018	2,871	+1.71%
2023	3,201	+2.20%
The 2006 population is for a larger area of 119.61 km^{2}. Source:

Hexton statistical area had a population of 3,201 in the 2023 New Zealand census, an increase of 330 people (11.5%) since the 2018 census, and an increase of 564 people (21.4%) since the 2013 census. There were 1,689 males, 1,503 females, and 6 people of other genders in 1,131 dwellings. 1.8% of people identified as LGBTIQ+. The median age was 41.5 years (compared with 38.1 years nationally). There were 609 people (19.0%) aged under 15 years, 570 (17.8%) aged 15 to 29, 1,473 (46.0%) aged 30 to 64, and 552 (17.2%) aged 65 or older.

People could identify as more than one ethnicity. The results were 81.3% European (Pākehā); 26.6% Māori; 3.5% Pasifika; 3.1% Asian; 0.7% Middle Eastern, Latin American and African New Zealanders (MELAA); and 2.3% other, which includes people giving their ethnicity as "New Zealander". English was spoken by 97.9%, Māori by 5.3%, Samoan by 1.4%, and other languages by 5.2%. No language could be spoken by 1.5% (e.g. too young to talk). New Zealand Sign Language was known by 0.2%. The percentage of people born overseas was 14.2, compared with 28.8% nationally.

Religious affiliations were 34.3% Christian, 0.3% Hindu, 0.3% Islam, 1.3% Māori religious beliefs, 0.5% Buddhist, 0.3% New Age, and 0.7% other religions. People who answered that they had no religion were 55.8%, and 6.7% of people did not answer the census question.

Of those at least 15 years old, 525 (20.3%) people had a bachelor's or higher degree, 1,503 (58.0%) had a post-high school certificate or diploma, and 570 (22.0%) people exclusively held high school qualifications. The median income was $46,000, compared with $41,500 nationally. 342 people (13.2%) earned over $100,000 compared to 12.1% nationally. The employment status of those at least 15 was 1,419 (54.7%) full-time, 462 (17.8%) part-time, and 36 (1.4%) unemployed.

== Marae ==
Tarere Marae and Te Aotipu meeting house is a meeting place of the hapū of Te Whānau a Iwi.

== Education ==
Makauri School is a Year 1–6 co-educational public primary school with a roll of 153 as of July 2026. The school opened in 1886.
