= Te Hāpara =

Suburb of Gisborne, New Zealand

- Suburb
- Interactive map of Te Hāpara
- Coordinates: 38°39′05″S 177°59′50″E
- Country: New Zealand
- City: Gisborne
- Local authority: Gisborne District Council
- Electoral ward: Tairāwhiti General Ward

Area
  - Land: 383 ha (950 acres)

Population (June 2025)
  - Total: 8,580
  - Density: 2,240/km^{2} (5,800/sq mi)

Taruheru	Riverdale	Mangapapa
Mākaraka	Te Hāpara	Whataupoko
Elgin	Awapuni	Gisborne Central

Te Hāpara is a suburb of the New Zealand city of Gisborne. It is located in the northwest of the city. It contains one primary school, Te Hapara School, which is located in Mill Road.

The New Zealand Ministry for Culture and Heritage gives a translation of "the dawn" for Te Hāpara.

== Demographics ==
Te Hapara covers 3.83 km^{2} (1.48 sq mi) and had an estimated population of 8,580 as of June 2025, with a population density of 2,240 people per km^{2}.

Historical population
Year	Pop.	±% p.a.
2006	7,104	—
2013	7,149	+0.09%
2018	7,749	+1.62%
2023	8,289	+1.36%

Te Hapara had a population of 8,289 in the 2023 New Zealand census, an increase of 540 people (7.0%) since the 2018 census, and an increase of 1,140 people (15.9%) since the 2013 census. There were 4,059 males, 4,209 females, and 15 people of other genders in 2,916 dwellings. 2.6% of people identified as LGBTIQ+. There were 1,776 people (21.4%) aged under 15 years, 1,614 (19.5%) aged 15 to 29, 3,549 (42.8%) aged 30 to 64, and 1,347 (16.3%) aged 65 or older.

People could identify as more than one ethnicity. The results were 55.3% European (Pākehā); 52.8% Māori; 6.9% Pasifika; 6.3% Asian; 1.0% Middle Eastern, Latin American and African New Zealanders (MELAA); and 2.1% other, which includes people giving their ethnicity as "New Zealander". English was spoken by 95.8%, Māori by 13.9%, Samoan by 0.5%, and other languages by 7.7%. No language could be spoken by 2.5% (e.g. too young to talk). New Zealand Sign Language was known by 0.5%. The percentage of people born overseas was 14.3, compared with 28.8% nationally.

Religious affiliations were 30.9% Christian, 1.3% Hindu, 0.4% Islam, 3.9% Māori religious beliefs, 0.4% Buddhist, 0.3% New Age, and 1.5% other religions. People who answered that they had no religion were 52.8%, and 8.5% of people did not answer the census question.

Of those at least 15 years old, 981 (15.1%) people had a bachelor's or higher degree, 3,660 (56.2%) had a post-high school certificate or diploma, and 1,866 (28.7%) people exclusively held high school qualifications. 318 people (4.9%) earned over $100,000 compared to 12.1% nationally. The employment status of those at least 15 was 3,156 (48.5%) full-time, 768 (11.8%) part-time, and 279 (4.3%) unemployed.

Individual statistical areas
Name	Area (km^{2})	Population	Density (per km^{2})	Dwellings	Median age	Median income
Te Hapara North	1.20	2,196	1,830	747	38.7 years	$38,100
Te Hapara South	0.86	2,400	2,791	804	33.8 years	$35,600
Te Hapara East	0.95	2,088	2,198	822	38.1 years	$35,300
Centennial Crescent	0.82	1,605	1,957	543	34.3 years	$32,800
New Zealand					38.1 years	$41,500

== Parks ==
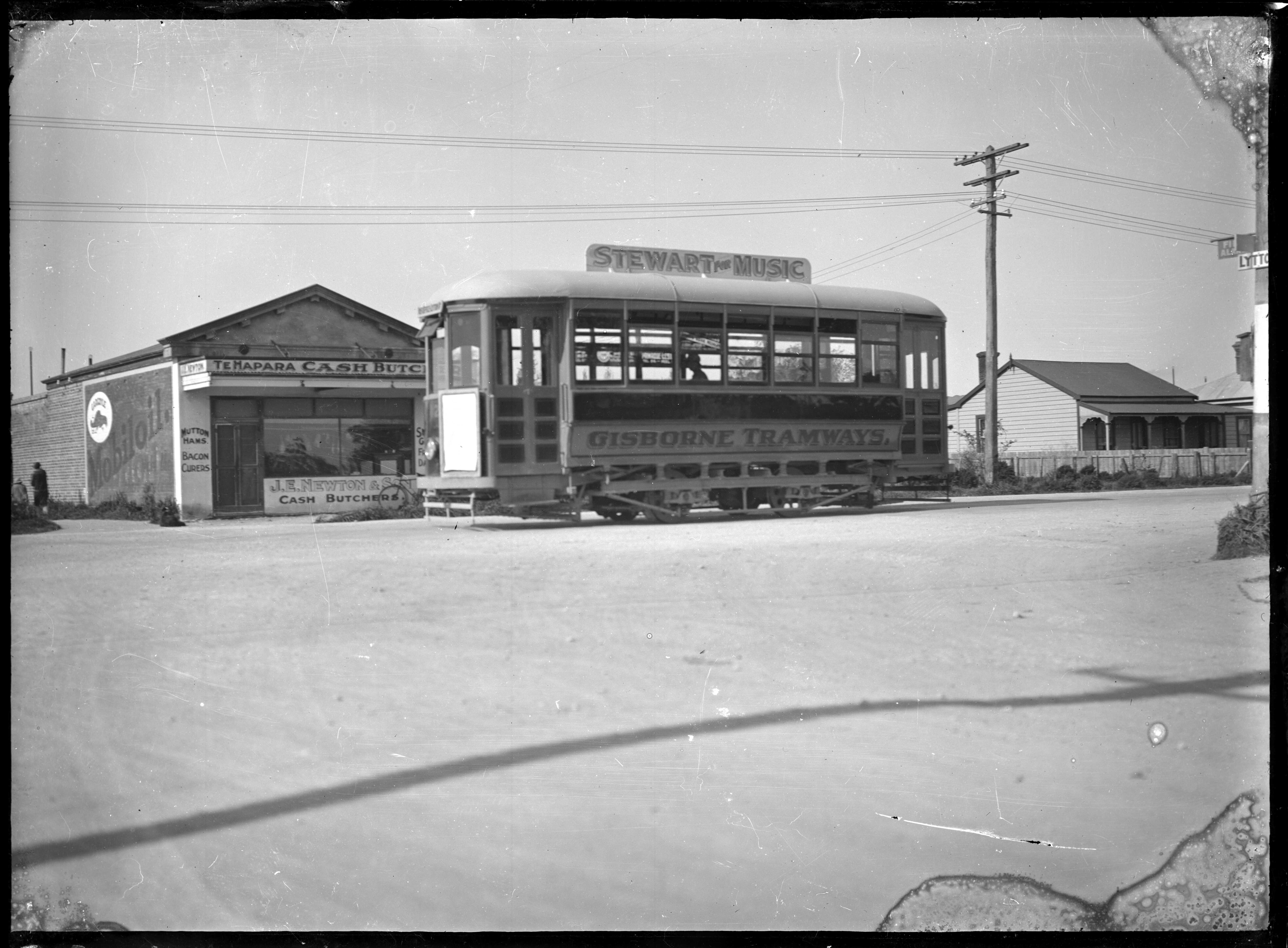
Tram in Te Hapara circa 1927

Te Hapara has two sports grounds: the Harry Barker Reserve (for cricket and hockey) and Barry Park.

Blackpool Street Reserve is a local park and dog walking area.

== Education ==
Gisborne Girls' High School is a Year 9-15 single-sex girls' state high school with a roll of 663. The school opened in 1956, when Gisborne High School (founded in 1907) was split into two single-sex schools.

Campion College is a Catholic co-educational state integrated high school catering for years 7 to 15. with a roll of 472. The college was formed in 1976 by the merger of the boys' Edmund Campion College and girls' St Mary’s College, which had shared the site since 1974. Edmund Campion College was founded in 1960, and St Mary's College was founded in 1943.

Te Hapara School is a Year 1-6 co-educational state primary school with a roll of 213. The school opened in 1911 and became known as Te Hapara the following year.

St Mary's Catholic School is a Year 1-6 co-educational state integrated primary school with a roll of 241. The school opened in 1926.

Rolls are as of October 2025.
