= Mangapapa =

Suburb of Gisborne, New Zealand

- Suburb
- Interactive map of Mangapapa
- Coordinates: 38°38′45″S 178°00′51″E
- Country: New Zealand
- City: Gisborne
- Local authority: Gisborne District Council
- Electoral ward: Tairāwhiti General Ward

Area
  - Land: 312 ha (770 acres)

Population (June 2025)
  - Total: 5,030
  - Density: 1,610/km^{2} (4,180/sq mi)

Riverdale, New Zealand
Te Hapara	Mangapapa
Elgin	Gisborne Central	Whataupoko

Mangapapa is a suburb of the New Zealand city of Gisborne. It is located in the north of the city. Whataupoko lies to the southeast and Te Hapara to the south, separated from Mangapapa by the Taruheru River.

Gisborne Hospital is located in Mangapapa, as was the former Cook Hospital.

The population was estimated to be 5,030 in June 2025.

== Demographics ==
Mangapapa covers 3.12 km^{2} (1.20 sq mi) and had an estimated population of 5,030 as of June 2025, with a population density of 1,612 people per km^{2}.

Historical population
Year	Pop.	±% p.a.
2006	4,260	—
2013	4,194	−0.22%
2018	4,530	+1.55%
2023	4,845	+1.35%

Mangapapa had a population of 4,845 in the 2023 New Zealand census, an increase of 315 people (7.0%) since the 2018 census, and an increase of 651 people (15.5%) since the 2013 census. There were 2,364 males, 2,469 females, and 15 people of other genders in 1,626 dwellings. 3.1% of people identified as LGBTIQ+. The median age was 34.3 years (compared with 38.1 years nationally). There were 1,128 people (23.3%) aged under 15 years, 975 (20.1%) aged 15 to 29, 2,103 (43.4%) aged 30 to 64, and 639 (13.2%) aged 65 or older.

People could identify as more than one ethnicity. The results were 60.9% European (Pākehā); 51.5% Māori; 5.5% Pasifika; 5.9% Asian; 0.4% Middle Eastern, Latin American and African New Zealanders (MELAA); and 2.0% other, which includes people giving their ethnicity as "New Zealander". English was spoken by 96.1%, Māori by 13.2%, Samoan by 0.1%, and other languages by 7.1%. No language could be spoken by 2.4% (e.g. too young to talk). New Zealand Sign Language was known by 0.3%. The percentage of people born overseas was 12.6, compared with 28.8% nationally.

Religious affiliations were 28.1% Christian, 0.8% Hindu, 0.2% Islam, 3.0% Māori religious beliefs, 0.5% Buddhist, 0.6% New Age, 0.1% Jewish, and 0.9% other religions. People who answered that they had no religion were 57.8%, and 8.1% of people did not answer the census question.

Of those at least 15 years old, 642 (17.3%) people had a bachelor's or higher degree, 2,094 (56.3%) had a post-high school certificate or diploma, and 984 (26.5%) people exclusively held high school qualifications. The median income was $38,600, compared with $41,500 nationally. 258 people (6.9%) earned over $100,000 compared to 12.1% nationally. The employment status of those at least 15 was 1,926 (51.8%) full-time, 540 (14.5%) part-time, and 150 (4.0%) unemployed.

Individual statistical areas
Name	Area (km^{2})	Population	Density (per km^{2})	Dwellings	Median age	Median income
Mangapapa North	0.62	1,479	2,385	498	33.3 years	$38,700
Mangapapa East	1.66	1,341	808	477	38.4 years	$43,500
Mangapapa South	0.84	2,025	2,411	651	32.8 years	$35,100
New Zealand					38.1 years	$41,500

== Parks ==
Atkinson Street Park is a local park and dog walking area, located in Mangapapa.

== Education ==
Mangapapa School is a state coeducational contributing primary school with a roll of 418 as of July 2025. The school was opened in 1903.
