= Gisborne, New Zealand =

Gisborne Tūranga-nui-a-Kiwa (Māori)
- City
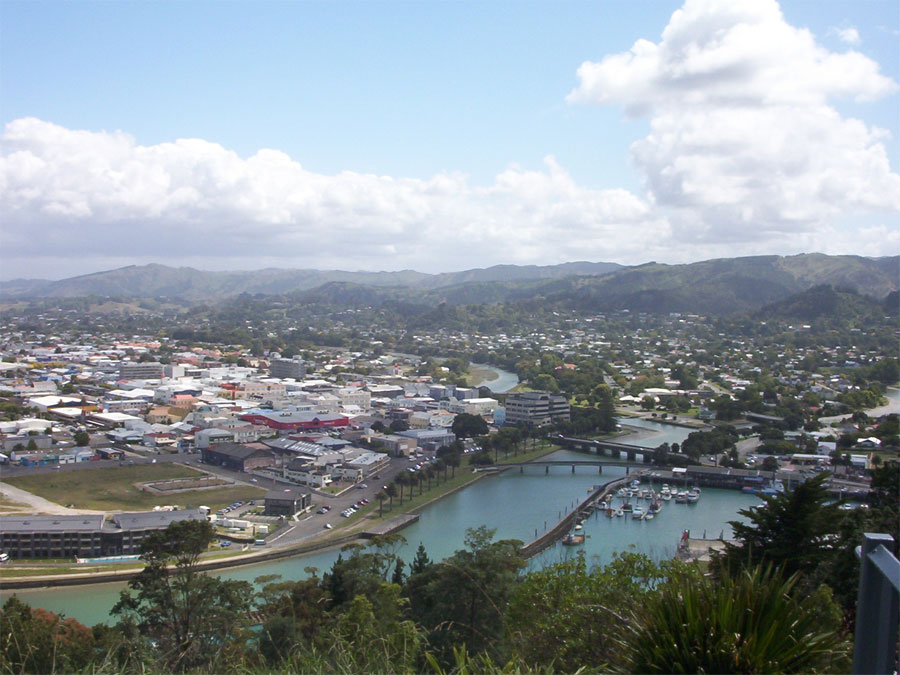
- Central and northeastern Gisborne viewed from Kaiti Hill

- Coat of arms

- Location in New Zealand
- Coordinates: 38°39′45″S 178°1′4″E
- Country: New Zealand
- Region: Gisborne District

Government
  - Mayor: Rehette Stoltz

Area
  - Total: 37.43 km^{2} (14.45 sq mi)

Population (June 2025)
  - Total: 38,100
  - Density: 1,020/km^{2} (2,640/sq mi)
- Time zone: UTC+12 (NZST)
  - Summer (DST): UTC+13 (NZDT)
- Area code: 06
- Website: GDC.govt.nz

Gisborne is a city in northeastern New Zealand and the largest settlement in the Gisborne District (or Gisborne Region). It has a population of 38,100 (June 2025). Gisborne District Council has its headquarters in the central city.

== Etymology ==
The Gisborne area was known in Māori as Tūranganui-a-Kiwa (the 'great standing place of Kiwa'), after Kiwa, who arrived on the waka Tākitimu, which landed at Gisborne. The original English language name for the settlement was Tūranga. It was renamed Gisborne in 1870, in honour of New Zealand Colonial Secretary William Gisborne, although he had no real connection with the area, to avoid confusion with Tauranga.

== Early history ==
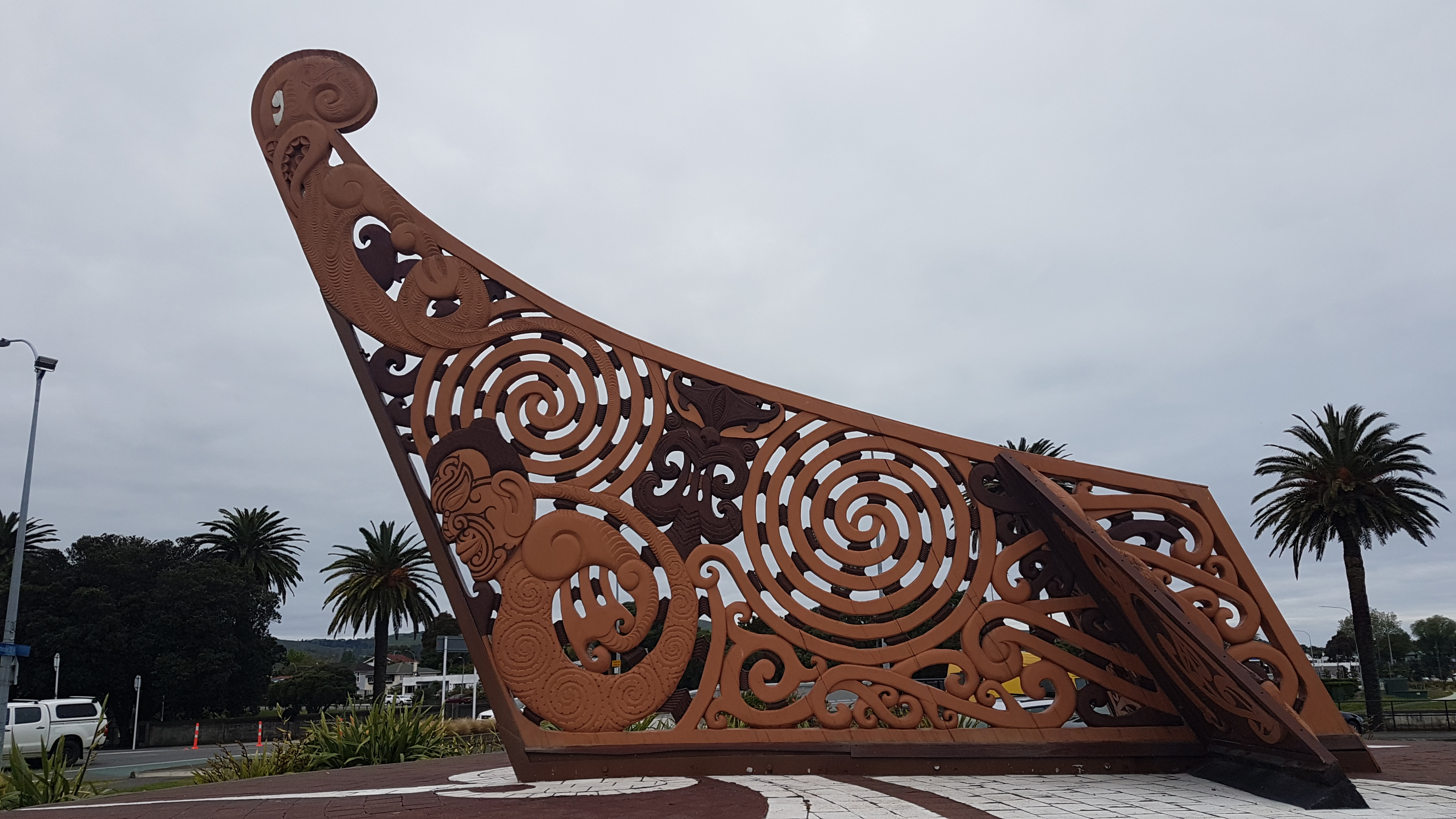
Te Tauihu Tūranga Whakamana, a sculpture designed by Derek Lardelli and Te Aturangi Nepia-Clamp in the shape of a tauihu (canoe prow) to recognise the Māori ancestors who explored the Pacific Ocean by canoe well before the European Age of Discovery

=== First arrivals ===
The Gisborne region has been settled for over 700 years. For centuries, the region has been inhabited by the tribes of Te Whānau-a-Kai, Ngaariki Kaiputahi, Te Aitanga-a-Māhaki, Rongowhakaata, Ngāi Tāmanuhiri and Te Aitanga-a-Hauiti. They descend from the voyagers of the Te Ikaroa-a-Rauru, Horouta and Tākitimu waka.

East Coast oral traditions offer differing versions of Gisborne's establishment by Māori. One legend recounts that in the 14th century the great navigator Kiwa landed at the Tūranganui River first on the waka Tākitimu after voyaging to the region from Hawaiki and that Pāoa, captain of the waka Horouta, followed later. An alternative legend recounts that Kiwa waited so long for the Horouta canoe to arrive that he called its final landing place Tūranganui-a-Kiwa (the long waiting place of Kiwa).

A more popular version of events is that Horouta preceded Tākitimu. In 1931, Sir Āpirana Ngata stated that Horouta was the main canoe that brought the people to the East Coast and that Ngāti Porou always regarded Takitimu as "an unimportant canoe". Māori historian Rongowhakaata Halbert affirmed this account, stating that Paoa's crew on the Horouta were the first inhabitants of the East Coast after migrating from Ahuahu or Great Mercury Island. Paoa gave his name to various places across the region, most notably the Waipaoa River (Wai-o-Pāoa).

During the 14th century, Māori tribes built fishing villages close to the sea and built pā on nearby hilltops.

=== Captain Cook landing ===
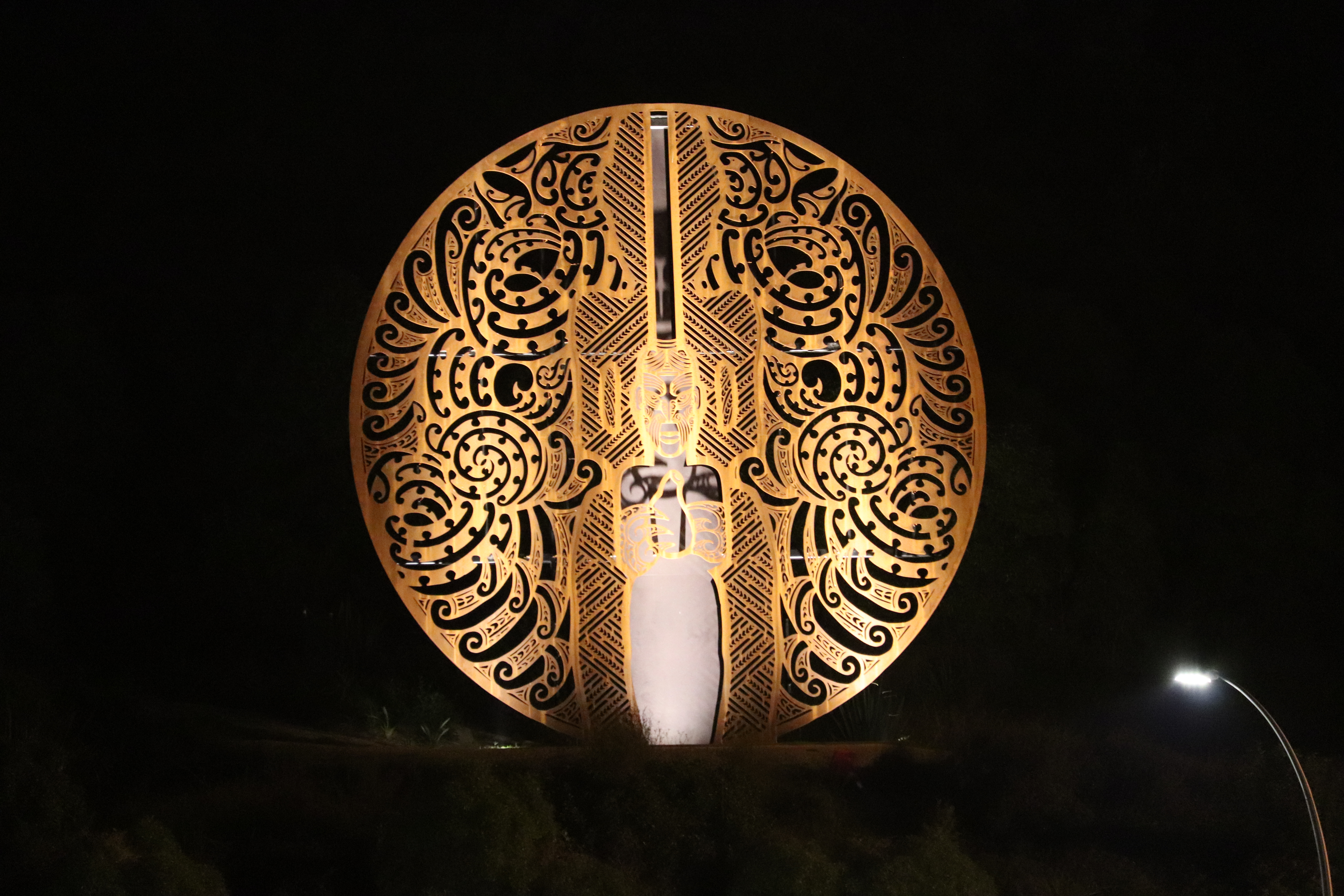
Memorial for Te Maro

Gisborne's Kaiti Beach is the place where British navigator Captain James Cook made his first landing in New Zealand upon the Endeavour. Cook had earlier set off from Plymouth, England, in August 1768 on a mission bound for Tahiti. Once he had concluded his duties in Tahiti, Cook continued south to look for a large landmass or continent, before heading west. Young Nick's Head was thought to be the first piece of New Zealand land sighted by Cook's party, and so named because it was first observed by cabin boy Nicholas Young on 6 October 1769.

On 9 October, Cook came ashore on the eastern bank of the Tūranganui River, accompanied by a party of men. Their arrival was marred by misunderstanding and resulted in the death and wounding of nine Māori over four days. It was also on the banks of the Tūranganui River that first the township of Turanga, then the city of Gisborne, grew as European traders and whalers began to settle in the river and port area.

The landing site was commemorated by a monument in 1906, on the 137th anniversary of Cook's arrival. In 1964, the Gisborne committee of the New Zealand Historic Places Trust registered the land around the monument as a historic reserve, and in 1990 it was designated a National Historic Reserve and put under the care of the Department of Conservation.

In 2019, a memorial was erected by Ngāti Oneone on Titirangi, a local hill, to honour Te Maro, who was one of the first casualties of the arrival of the ship Endeavour.

=== European settlement and town growth ===
Starting in the early 1830s, traders such as Captain John Harris and Captain George E. Read set up the first trading stations along the Tūranganui river and are attributed to the founding of the town. Over the next 30 years, many more European traders and missionaries migrated to the region. In 1868, the government bought 300 hectares of land for a town site. The town was laid out in 1870 and the name changed from Turanga to Gisborne, after the then colonial secretary, and to avoid confusion with Tauranga. In 1872, Gisborne's first public school was opened and its first newspaper, the Poverty Bay Standard was established. A town council was formed in 1877.

== Geography ==
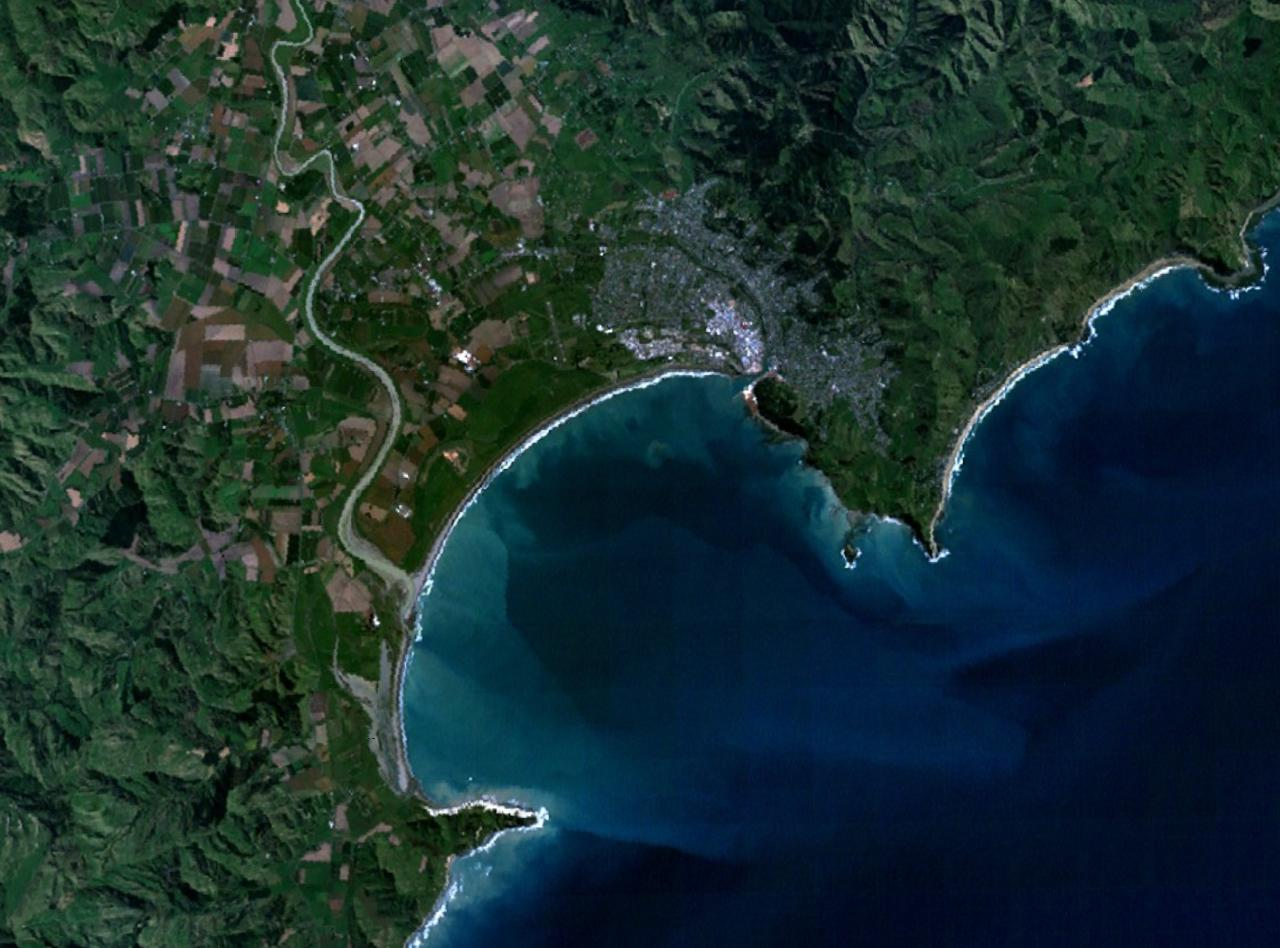
NASA satellite photo of Poverty Bay

Gisborne is on the east coast of New Zealand's North Island, in the southern part of the Gisborne District and on the north side of Poverty Bay. The Poverty Bay flats encompass Gisborne city as well as surrounding areas Mākaraka, Matawhero and Ormond, where vineyards and farms predominate. Gisborne is flat towards the shoreline, but hilly and forested inland.

Gisborne boasts a large stretch of coastline encompassing the Waikanae and Midway, Kaiti, Sponge Bay, Wainui and Makorori white sand beaches, which are popular for swimming and surfing. Sometimes referred to as the 'City of Rivers', Gisborne sits at the convergence of the Waimata, Taruheru and Tūranganui rivers. The Tūranganui, only 1.2 kilometres long, is the shortest river in New Zealand.

Kaiti Hill (Titirangi), which sits directly above Cook's landing site, provides expansive views over the city and wider Poverty Bay. Many archaeological sites have been identified on Titirangi, including burial grounds, terraces, and middens. Titirangi Pā sits near the summit.

In the wider area surrounding Gisborne are two arboreta, Eastwoodhill, the National Arboretum of New Zealand at Ngatapa which spans over 130 hectares, and the smaller 50 hectare Hackfalls Arboretum at Tiniroto.

Until Samoa and Tokelau's dateline shift in December 2011, Gisborne claimed to be the first city on Earth to see the sun rise each day. However, this is now only accurate in New Zealand's summer months. Sunrise in Gisborne ranges from 5:36 am in early December to 7:26 am in late June.

=== Climate ===
The region is sheltered by high country to the west. Gisborne enjoys a temperate oceanic climate (Cfb – Köppen climate classification) with warm summers and cool winters, temperatures rarely drop below 0 °C (32 °F) and occasionally rise above 30 °C (86 °F) with a yearly average of 2,200 sunshine hours. The annual rainfall varies from about 1,000 mm (39 in) near the coast to over 2,500 mm (98 in) in higher inland country. According to the NIWA dataset for 1981–2010 normals, Gisborne narrowly edged several other New Zealand cities to have the warmest summer maxima of official stations.

Winters are slightly cooler than more northerly areas, rendering that over the course of the calendar year, Gisborne is not the warmest station in the country. Even summer mean temperatures are lower than in northerly areas, despite the highs, due to the cooler nights. Despite this, yearly mean temperatures are still some way above average for New Zealand as a whole.

Climate data for Gisborne (1991–2020 normals, extremes 1905–present)
Month	Jan	Feb	Mar	Apr	May	Jun	Jul	Aug	Sep	Oct	Nov	Dec	Year
Record high °C (°F)	38.2 (100.8)	36.6 (97.9)	35.1 (95.2)	31.0 (87.8)	27.8 (82.0)	23.2 (73.8)	21.9 (71.4)	23.0 (73.4)	27.1 (80.8)	30.8 (87.4)	34.8 (94.6)	37.2 (99.0)	38.2 (100.8)
Mean daily maximum °C (°F)	25.8 (78.4)	25.7 (78.3)	23.8 (74.8)	20.9 (69.6)	18.4 (65.1)	15.7 (60.3)	14.7 (58.5)	15.7 (60.3)	17.6 (63.7)	20.1 (68.2)	21.7 (71.1)	23.8 (74.8)	20.3 (68.5)
Daily mean °C (°F)	20.1 (68.2)	20.2 (68.4)	18.3 (64.9)	15.6 (60.1)	13.2 (55.8)	10.8 (51.4)	10.1 (50.2)	10.7 (51.3)	12.6 (54.7)	14.7 (58.5)	16.3 (61.3)	18.5 (65.3)	15.1 (59.2)
Mean daily minimum °C (°F)	14.3 (57.7)	14.7 (58.5)	12.8 (55.0)	10.3 (50.5)	8.0 (46.4)	5.9 (42.6)	5.5 (41.9)	5.7 (42.3)	7.6 (45.7)	9.3 (48.7)	10.9 (51.6)	13.1 (55.6)	9.8 (49.6)
Record low °C (°F)	2.2 (36.0)	3.3 (37.9)	0.8 (33.4)	−1.7 (28.9)	−3.4 (25.9)	−3.9 (25.0)	−4.4 (24.1)	−5.3 (22.5)	−2.3 (27.9)	−0.6 (30.9)	−0.6 (30.9)	0.0 (32.0)	−5.3 (22.5)
Average rainfall mm (inches)	71.4 (2.81)	65.9 (2.59)	94.0 (3.70)	107.1 (4.22)	84.0 (3.31)	107.4 (4.23)	118.7 (4.67)	78.1 (3.07)	73.1 (2.88)	76.1 (3.00)	65.2 (2.57)	59.9 (2.36)	1,000.9 (39.41)
Average rainy days (≥ 1.0 mm)	6.2	7.6	9.0	9.4	9.9	10.2	12.4	11.1	8.7	7.3	7.8	7.2	106.8
Average relative humidity (%)	70.0	77.4	79.8	80.5	81.1	82.4	82.3	78.6	72.4	71.5	68.3	68.7	76.1
Mean monthly sunshine hours	259.9	204.9	193.0	165.3	151.3	133.2	130.3	172.6	189.4	230.9	228.6	236.9	2,296.3
Source: NIWA Climate Data

== Demographics ==
Stats NZ describes Gisborne as a large urban area, which covers 37.43 km^{2} (14.45 sq mi). It had an estimated population of 38,100 as of June 2025, with a population density of 1,018 people per km^{2}.

Historical population
Year	Pop.	±% p.a.
2006	31,287	—
2013	31,299	+0.01%
2018	34,644	+2.05%
2023	36,912	+1.28%

Gisborne had a population of 36,912 in the 2023 New Zealand census, an increase of 2,268 people (6.5%) since the 2018 census, and an increase of 5,613 people (17.9%) since the 2013 census. There were 17,970 males, 18,846 females, and 96 people of other genders in 12,570 dwellings. 2.6% of people identified as LGBTIQ+. The median age was 36.4 years (compared with 38.1 years nationally). There were 8,109 people (22.0%) aged under 15 years, 7,077 (19.2%) aged 15 to 29, 15,465 (41.9%) aged 30 to 64, and 6,264 (17.0%) aged 65 or older.

People could identify as more than one ethnicity. The results were 57.5% European (Pākehā); 52.9% Māori; 6.2% Pasifika; 4.8% Asian; 0.9% Middle Eastern, Latin American and African New Zealanders (MELAA); and 1.9% other, which includes people giving their ethnicity as "New Zealander". English was spoken by 96.1%, Māori by 14.6%, Samoan by 0.4%, and other languages by 7.0%. No language could be spoken by 2.2% (e.g. too young to talk). New Zealand Sign Language was known by 0.4%. The percentage of people born overseas was 13.2, compared with 28.8% nationally.

Religious affiliations were 31.2% Christian, 0.7% Hindu, 0.3% Islam, 4.3% Māori religious beliefs, 0.4% Buddhist, 0.5% New Age, 0.1% Jewish, and 1.3% other religions. People who answered that they had no religion were 53.6%, and 8.0% of people did not answer the census question.

Of those at least 15 years old, 5,061 (17.6%) people had a bachelor's or higher degree, 15,894 (55.2%) had a post-high school certificate or diploma, and 7,851 (27.3%) people exclusively held high school qualifications. The median income was $36,200, compared with $41,500 nationally. 1,935 people (6.7%) earned over $100,000 compared to 12.1% nationally. The employment status of those at least 15 was 13,689 (47.5%) full-time, 3,840 (13.3%) part-time, and 1,182 (4.1%) unemployed.

Individual SA3 statistical areas
Name	Area (km^{2})	Population	Density (per km^{2})	Dwellings	Median age	Median income
Lytton	0.86	1,431	459	615	68.3 years	$28,800
Mangapapa	3.12	4,845	1,553	1,626	34.3 years	$38,600
Riverdale	1.24	1,350	1,089	492	42.6 years	$41,400
Gisborne Centre	10.89	2,940	371	1,146	37.2 years	$36,800
Whataupoko	3.79	4,020	1,061	1,539	42.7 years	$44,300
Te Hāpara	3.01	6,681	2,220	2,370	36.5 years	$36,400
Elgin	1.04	2,745	2,639	855	32.6 years	$32,600
Wainui-Okitu	6.20	2,004	323	729	42.2 years	$52,600
Kaiti	6.20	8,217	1,325	2,442	32.8 years	$32,400
Tamarau	1.11	2,676	2,411	759	30.1 years	$32,400
New Zealand					38.1 years	$41,500

== Economy ==
The harbour was host to many ships in the past, and had developed as a river port to provide a more secure location for shipping compared with the open roadstead of Poverty Bay, which can be exposed to southerly swells. A meat works was sited beside the harbour and meat and wool were shipped from here. Now the harbour is the home of many smaller fishing boats as well as ships loading logs for export. In February 2018, the first grants from the Provincial Growth Fund included $2.3 million for the Gisborne port.

In terms of Employment, Gisborne's main industries are pasture/grain farming, school education, agriculture and fishing support services, and hospitality.

== Transport ==
=== Air ===
Gisborne Airport serves as the domestic airport for the Gisborne District. Regular flights between Auckland and Wellington are serviced by Air New Zealand under the Link brand, while the smaller Air Napier provides services to Napier and Wairoa. For 25 years Sunair operated from Gisborne to Hamilton, Rotorua, Napier, Whakatāne, Tauranga, Palmerston North, Paraparaumu and Wellington but those services were suspended in 2022. In 2023 Sunair announced it would give Gisborne another chance with services from Hamilton and Tauranga.

=== Highways ===
State Highway 2 connects Gisborne to Tauranga via Ōpōtiki and Whakatāne to the northwest, and to Napier and the rest of Hawke's Bay via Wairoa to the south. SH 2 travels towards Gisborne from the northwest from Te Karaka, a settlement 31 km northwest of Gisborne. SH 2 passes through Makaraka, a suburb on the outer fringes of Gisborne. It then crosses the Waipaoa River and makes its way south through Manutuke and Wharerata before it enters the Hawke's Bay Region towards Nūhaka, Wairoa, and eventually on to Napier.

State Highway 35 (part of the Pacific Coast Highway network) begins at a junction west of Gisborne with SH 2 just before SH 2 crosses the Waipaoa River on its way south to Manutuke. SH 35 borders Gisborne Airport to the south and enters Gisborne city on the southwestern fringes. It makes its way through the city out to the east, and continues up the coast, connecting Gisborne to the East Cape.

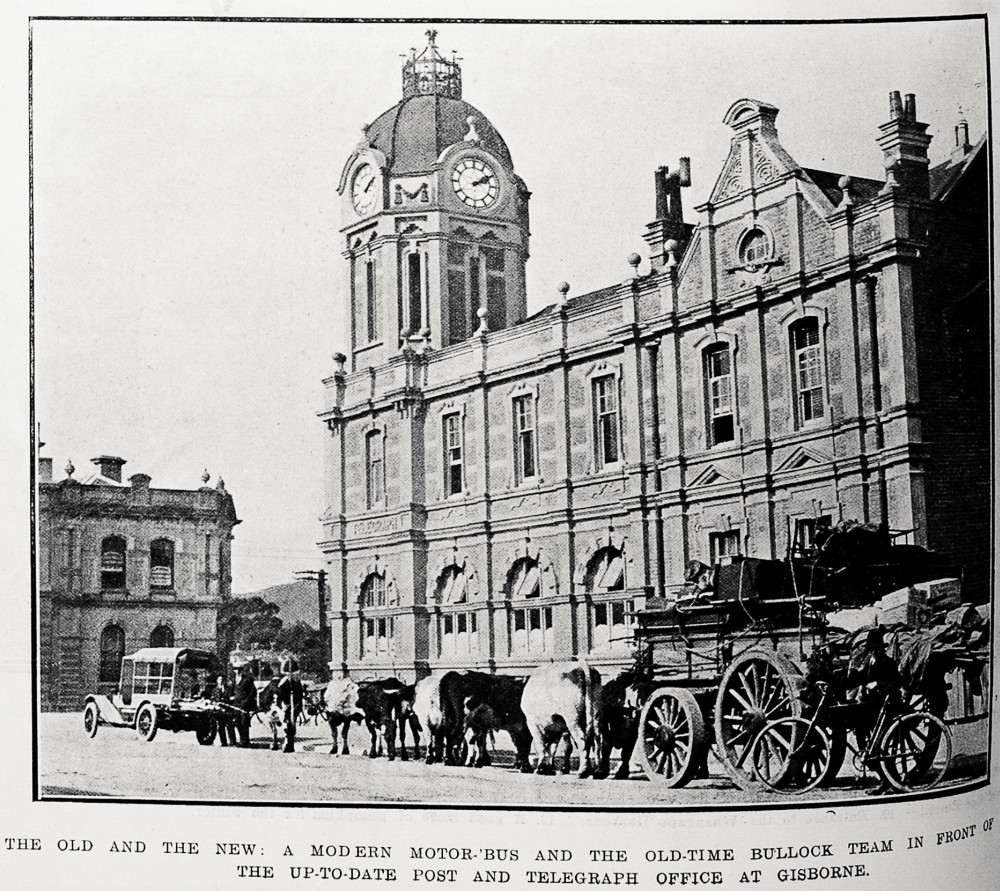
1916 bus and bullock team outside the Post Office

=== Public transport ===
Public transport is poorly developed in Gisborne, with only 0.2% of trips made by bus in 2013/14. This compares with 2.3% nationally, which itself is amongst the lowest proportions in the world. Go Bus is contracted to the council to run 30 services a day on 4 routes Monday to Friday under the Gizzy Bus brand. Gizzy Bus accepts Bee Card for fares, as well as cash.

From 1913 to 1929, Gisborne had battery-powered trams. Since then, public transport has declined to about a fifth of the usage then. In 1930, the municipal buses travelled 6,631 mi (10,672 km), and carried 28,531 passengers in 2 weeks. In 2012/13 the city buses carried about 78,000 passengers in 52 weeks, at a cost of about $120,000 a year, with about another $85,000 from fares.

=== Rail ===
Gisborne is the northern terminus of the Palmerston North - Gisborne Line railway, which opened in 1942 and mothballed (track kept in place, but all services cancelled) in 2012. The permanent way has since suffered storm damage including bridge collapses and the line is believed unlikely to re-open for economic reasons. Prior to this, an isolated section of line operated from Gisborne to Moutohora – intended to be part of a line to Auckland via Rotorua, and later part of the East Coast Main Trunk Railway line. This connection was never completed, and the Moutohora Branch line closed in 1959.

Rail passenger services were provided between Gisborne and Wellington until 1988, when the Endeavour express was cancelled north of Napier. Today, only the Gisborne City Vintage Railway operates limited heritage train rides out of Gisborne.

== Culture ==
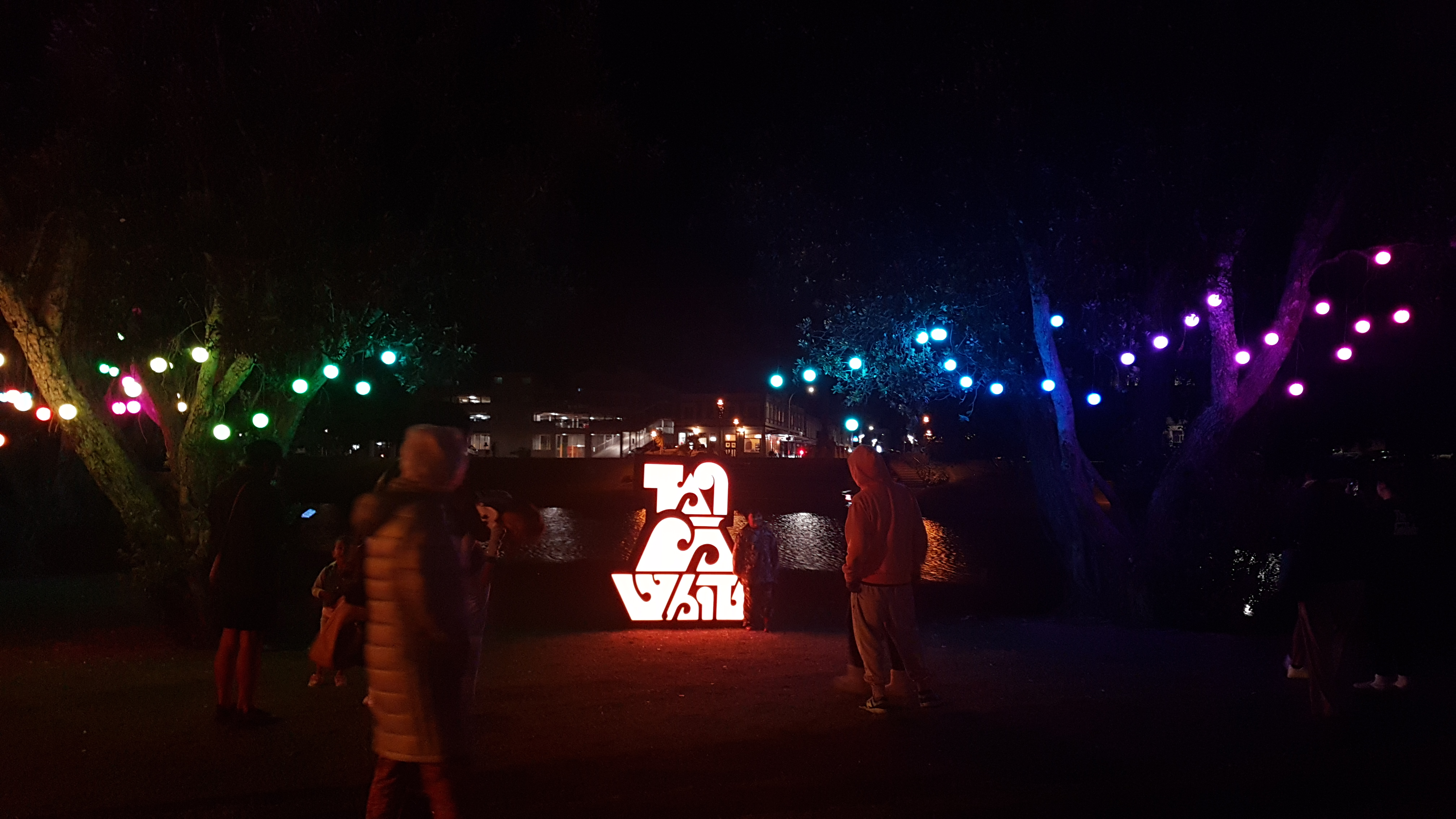
Te Tairāwhiti Arts Festival in 2020

Te Poho-o-Rawiri and Te Kuri a Tuatai marae are located in the city suburbs.

The Lowe Street Museum was the first museum in Gisborne, located in the Lowe Street Municipal Offices. In 1955, the collection of Māori artefacts of William Lysner were put in his former residence, Lysner House, which was sold to the city for a nominal sum. It is now known as the Tairāwhiti Museum.

The Tairāwhiti Tamararo Regionals are an annual regional haka competition held in Gisborne in memory of Karaitiana Tamararo.

Gisborne is host to Rhythm & Vines, an annual 3-day music festival held over the New Year at Waiohika Estate. In 2012 and 2013, Rhythm and Vines made skinny-dipping world record attempts.

Since 2019 the Te Tairāwhiti Arts Festival is an annual event in the region with many events taking place in Gisborne. The Gisborne Choral Society was founded in 1966.

== Sport ==
In rugby union Gisborne is home to Poverty Bay Rugby Football Union, who play in the Heartland Championship. The city is also home to several clubs who compete in the Poverty Bay competition – Horouta Sports Club, High School Old Boys (HSOB) Sports Club, Old Boys Marist (OBM) RFC, Pirates RFC, Waikohu Sports Club, and Young Māori Party (YMP) RFC. There are several other clubs in the wider Gisborne District.

In rugby league, Gisborne Taraiwhiti have historically represented Gisborne in national competitions. Gisborne is currently represented in the National Competition by the Waicoa Bay Stallions.

Gisborne is home to the Poverty Bay cricket team, who compete in the Hawke Cup. Poverty Bay is also a district association of the Northern Districts Cricket Association. First-class matches are sometimes held at Harry Barker Reserve. Clubs in the city include High School Old Boys (HSOB) Cricket Club and OBR Cricket Club.

In football, Gisborne Thistle AFC, Gisborne Marist AFC, Gisborne United AFC, Gisborne Bohemians FC, and Riverina AFC compete in competitions organised by the Central Football Federation. The now-defunct Gisborne City AFC won the Chatham Cup in 1987.

Netball in Gisborne is organised by the Gisborne Netball Centre. Netball teams in Gisborne are often associated with rugby or football clubs. Clubs include Horouta, High School Old Girls (HSOG), Old Boys Marist (OBM), Young Māori Party (YMP), and Gisborne Thistle.

Golf, basketball, rowing, hockey, tennis, and squash are also catered to.

Awapundi Speedway is a motorcycle speedway venue, on Awapundi Road, adjacent to the Awapundi Links golf course. The track races various types of cars, including sidecars, midgets, saloons, stockcars, streetstocks, in addition to motorcycle speedway. The track has held important events, including qualifying rounds of the Speedway World Championship and the finals of the New Zealand Solo Championship.

== Education ==
Gisborne City has four main high (secondary) schools: Gisborne Boys' High, Gisborne Girls' High, Lytton High and Campion College. Campion College is a Catholic co-educational school.

== Suburbs ==
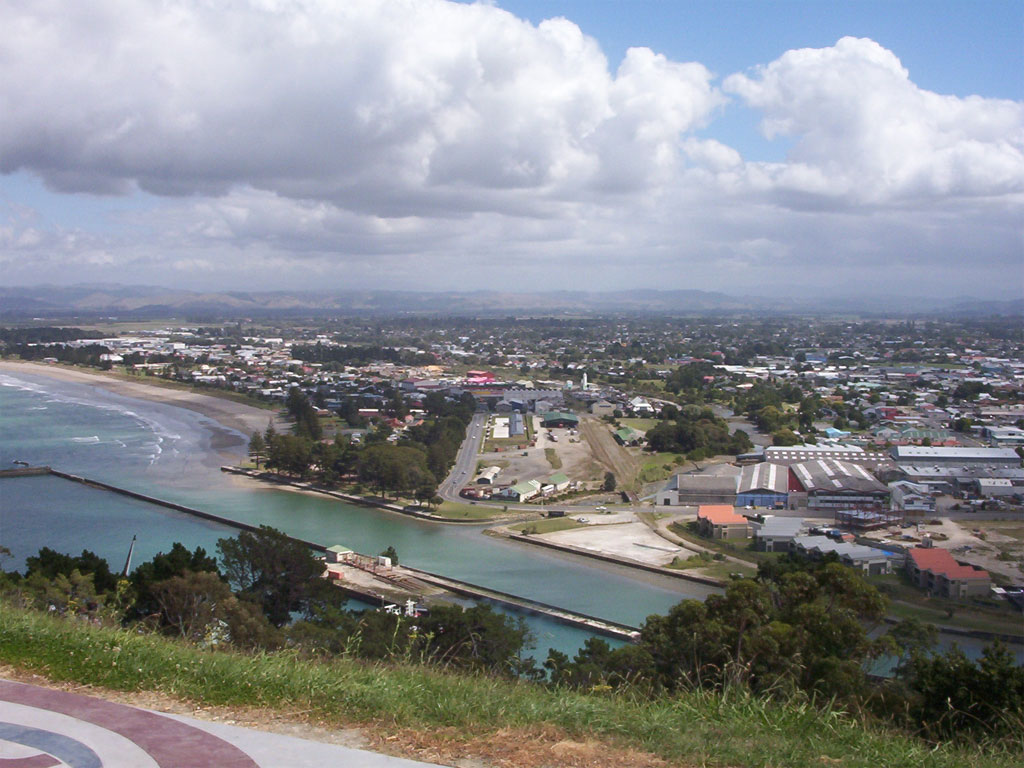
Coastal suburbs of Gisborne viewed from Kaiti Hill

- Awapuni
- Elgin
- Gaddums Hill
- Ilminster
- Inner Kaiti
- Kaiti
- Makaraka
- Manutuke
- Mangapapa
- Makorori
- Riverdale
- Riverside
- Riverview
- Sponge Bay
- Tamarau
- Te Hapara
- Te Wharau
- Victoria
- Waikanae
- Waikirikiri
- Wainui Beach
- Whataupoko

== In popular culture ==
Gisborne City was the setting of the 2014 drama film The Dark Horse, a biographical film starring Cliff Curtis about the late speed-chess champion, Genesis Potini. The film was shot in Gisborne and Auckland in the winter of 2013.

In March 2016, Gisborne hosted the premiere of Mahana, a New Zealand film set in Patutahi and Manutuke, and based on Witi Ihimaera's semi-autobiographical novel Bulibasha: King Of The Gypsies.

== Sister cities ==
Gisborne has four sister cities, a sister port, and five friendly cities.

- (France) Mahina, French Polynesia
- Nonoichi, Ishikawa, Japan
- Palm Desert, California, United States
- Rizhao, Shandong, China

=== Sister port ===
- Gamagōri, Aichi, Japan

=== Friendly cities ===
- Cassino, Italy
- Shire of Macedon Ranges, Victoria, Australia
- Valverde del Majano, Spain
- Wenchang, Hainan, China
- Whitby, England, United Kingdom

== See also ==
- List of people from Gisborne, New Zealand
