= List of marae in the Gisborne District =

There are about 80 marae (Māori meeting grounds) in the Gisborne District of New Zealand. They include the marae of six iwi (tribes): Ngāti Porou, Te Aitanga-ā-Hauiti, Te Aitanga-a-Māhaki, Te Whānau-ā-Apanui, Ngai Tamanuhiri and Rongowhakaata.

In October 2020, the Government committed $14,267,895 from the Provincial Growth Fund to upgrade 59 marae in the district, with the intention of creating 393.6 jobs.

== Gisborne ==
Marae name	Wharenui name	Iwi and Hapū	Location
Māngatu	Te Ngāwari	Te Aitanga ā Māhaki (Ngariki)	Whatatutu
Manutuke Marae	Te Poho o Rukupo / Te Poho o Epeha	Rongowhakaata (Ngāti Kaipoho)	Manutuke
Mātāwai Marae	Tapapa	Te Aitanga ā Māhaki (Ngā Pōtiki, Ngāti Mātāwai, Ngāti Wahia, Te Whānau a Taupara)	Mātāwai
Muriwai Marae	Te Poho o Tamanuhiri	Ngāi Tāmanuhiri (Ngāi Tawehi, Ngāti Kahutia, Ngāti Rangitauwhiwhia, Ngāti Rangiwaho, Ngāti Rangiwahomatua)	Muriwai
Ngātapa Marae	No wharenui	Te Aitanga-a-Māhaki (Te Whānau a Kai)	Ngātapa
Ohako Marae	Te Kiko o te Rangi	Rongowhakaata (Ngāi Tāwhiri, Ruapani)	Manutuke
Pāhou Marae	Te Poho o Taharakau	Rongowhakaata (Ngāti Maru)	Manutuke
Pakowhai Marae	Te Poho o Hiraina	Te Aitanga-a-Māhaki (Te Whānau a Kai)	Patutahi
Parihimanihi	Te Poho o Māhaki	Te Aitanga-a-Māhaki (Ngāi Tūketenui, Ngāti Wahia)	Hexton
Rangatira Marae	Whakahau	Te Aitanga-a-Māhaki (Ngāti Wahia)	Te Karaka
Rangiwaho Marae	Rangiwaho	Ngāi Tāmanuhiri (Ngāi Tawehi, Ngāti Kahutia, Ngāti Rangitauwhiwhia, Ngāti Rangiwaho, Ngāti Rangiwahomatua)	Wharerata
Rongopai Marae	Rongopai	Te Aitanga-a-Māhaki (Te Whānau a Kai)	Patutahi
Taihamiti Marae	No wharenui	Te Aitanga ā Māhaki (Ngāi Tamatea)	Whatatutu
Takipu Marae	Te Poho o Pikihoro	Te Aitanga-a-Māhaki (Te Whānau a Taupara)	Te Karaka
Takitimu Marae	Te Poho o Whakarau Oratanga a Tamure	Te Aitanga-a-Māhaki (Ngā Pōtiki, Te Whānau a Kai)	Patutahi
Tapuihikitia	Te Aroha	Te Aitanga-a-Māhaki (Ngā Pōtiki, Te Whānau a Taupara)	Te Karaka
Tarere Marae	Te Aotipu	Te Aitanga ā Māhaki (Te Whānau a Iwi)	Hexton
Te Kuri a Tuatai / Awapuni Pā	Whareroa	Rongowhakaata (Ruapani, Ngāi Tāwhiri, Te Whānau a Iwi)	Awapuni
Te Poho-o-Rawiri Marae	Te Poho o Rawiri	Ngāti Porou (Ngāti Konohi, Ngāti Oneone)	Kaitī
Te Wainui	Te Whare o Hera	Te Aitanga-a-Māhaki (Ngariki)	Whatatutu
Waiari Marae	Waiari	Ngāi Tāmanuhiri (Ngāi Tawehi, Ngāti Kahutia, Ngāti Rangitauwhiwhia, Ngāti Rangiwaho, Ngāti Rangiwahomatua)	Muriwai
Whakato	Te Mana o Turanga	Rongowhakaata (Ngāti Maru)	Manutuke
Whāngārā Marae	Whitirēia / Waho Te Rangi	Ngāti Porou (Ngāti Konohi)	Whāngārā

== Tolaga Bay to Tokomaru Bay ==
Marae name	Wharenui name	Iwi and Hapū	Location
Hauiti Marae	Ruakapanga	Ngāti Porou (Ngāi Tutekohi, Ngāti Kahukuranui, Te Aitanga a Hauiti)	Tolaga Bay
Hinemaurea ki Mangatuna	Hinemaurea	Te Aitanga-ā-Hauiti (Ngāti Kahukuranui)	Tolaga Bay
Hinetamatea / Anaura	Hinetamatea	Te Aitanga-ā-Hauiti, Ngāti Porou (Ngāti Hau, Ngāti Ira, Ngāti Wakarara, Ngāti Patu Whare)	Anaura Bay
Ōkurī Marae	Ōkurī	Ngāti Porou (Ngāti Ira, Ngāti Kahukuranui)	Tolaga Bay
Pakirikiri	Te Hono ki Rarotonga	Ngāti Porou (Te Whānau a Ruataupare ki Tokomaru)	Tokomaru Bay
Puketawai Marae	Te Amowhiu	Ngāti Porou (Te Whānau a Te Rangipureora)	Tolaga Bay
Te Ariuru	Te Poho o Te Aotawarirangi	Ngāti Porou (Te Whānau a Te Aotawarirangi)	Tokomaru Bay
Te Rawheoro or Te Poho o Rawheoro Marae	Te Rawheoro or Te Poho o Rawheoro	Ngāti Porou (Ngāti Patu Whare, Te Aitanga a Hauiti, Ngāti Wakarara)	Tolaga Bay
Tuatini	Huiwhenua	Ngāti Porou (Ngāti Ira, Te Whānau a Ruataupare ki Tokomaru)	Tokomaru Bay
Waiparapara	Te Poho o Te Tikanga	Ngāti Porou (Te Whānau a Ruataupare ki Tokomaru)	Tokomaru Bay

== Ruatoria and Tikitiki ==
Marae name	Wharenui name	Iwi and Hapū	Location
Te Aowera Marae	Te Poho o Te Aowera	Ngāti Porou (Te Aowera)	Ruatōria
Hinepare	Te Tairawhiti	Ngāti Porou (Ngāi Tāne, Ngāti Hokopū, Ngāti Nua, Te Whānau a Hinepare, Te Whānau a Rerewa)	Rangitukia
Hiruharama Marae	Kapohanga a Rangi	Ngāti Porou (Te Aitanga a Mate, Te Aowera)	Ruatōria
Te Horo Marae	Rākaitemania	Ngāti Porou (Ngāti Horowai, Te Whānau a Mahaki, Te Whānau a Uruhonea)	Ruatōria
Kaiwaka Marae	Te Kapenga	Ngāti Porou (Ngāti Putaanga, Te Whānau a Hinerupe)	Tikitiki
Kakariki Marae	Rakaihoea	Ngāti Porou (Te Whānau a Rākaihoea)	Ruatōria
Kariaka	Ngāti Porou	Ngāti Porou (Ngāi Tangihaere, Te Whānau a Hinekehu)	Ruatōria
Karuwai	Te Rehu ā Karuwai	Ngāti Porou (Te Whānau a Karuwai, Te Whānau a Karuai)	Rangitukia
Mangahanea Marae	Hinetapora	Ngāti Porou (Ngāti Uepōhatu, Te Whānau a Hinetapora)	Ruatōria
Mangarua / Te Heapera	Te Poho o Mangarua	Ngāti Porou (Te Whānau a Hinetapora)	Ruatōria
Ōhinewaiapu Marae	Ōhinewaiapu	Ngāti Porou (Ngāi Tāne, Ngāti Hokopū, Ngāti Nua, Te Whānau a Hunaara, Te Whānau a Rerewa, Te Whānau a Takimoana)	Rangitukia
Putaanga Marae	Putaanga	Ngāti Porou (Ngāti Putaanga)	Tikitiki
Porourangi / Waiomatatini	Porourangi	Ngāti Porou (Te Whānau a Karuai)	Ruatōria
Rahui Marae	Rongomaianiwaniwa	Ngāti Porou (Te Whānau a Hinerupe, Te Whānau a Rākaimataura)	Tikitiki
Reporua	Tū Auau	Ngāti Porou (Ngāti Rangi)	Ruatōria
Rongohaerem / Te Pahou	Rongohaere	Ngāti Porou (Te Aitanga a Mate, Te Whānau a Rākairoa), Te Whānau-ā-Apanui (Te Whānau a Rutaia)	Makarika
Rongoitekai / Penu	Rongo i te Kai	Ngāti Porou (Te Aitanga a Mate)	Makarika
Ruataupare Marae	Ruataupare	Ngāti Porou (Ngāi Tangihaere)	Ruatōria
Rauru / Taumata o Mihi Marae	Rauru Nui a Toi	Ngāti Porou (Te Whānau a Hinekehu)	Ruatōria
Tikapa Marae	Pōkai	Ngāti Porou (Te Whānau a Hineauta, Te Whānau a Pōkai)	Tikapa
Tinātoka Marae	Te Poho o Tinatoka	Ngāti Porou (Te Whānau a Te Uruahi, Te Whanau a Tinatoka)	Tikitiki
Taumata o Tapuhi	Te Ao Kairau	Ngāti Porou (Te Whānau a Tapuhi)	Tikitiki
Uepohatu Marae	Uepōhatu	Ngāti Porou (Ngāti Uepōhatu)	Ruatōria
Umuariki Marae	Umuariki	Ngāti Porou (Ngāti Uepōhatu, Te Whānau a Umuariki)	Ruatōria
Whareponga Marae	Materoa	Ngāti Porou (Ngāi Tangihaere, Te Aitanga a Mate)	Whareponga

== Waipiro Bay and Te Puia Springs ==
Marae name	Wharenui name	Iwi and Hapū	Location
Iritekura Marae	Iritekura	Ngāti Porou (Te Whānau a Iritekura)	Waipiro Bay
Taharora Marae	Taharora	Ngāti Porou (Ngāi Taharora)	Waipiro Bay
Kie Kie	Hau	Ngāti Porou (Te Whānau a Rākairoa, Te Whānau a Te Haemata)	Waipiro Bay

== Te Araroa and East Cape ==
Marae name	Wharenui name	Iwi and Hapū	Location
Awatere	Te Aotaihi	Ngāti Porou (Te Whānau a Hinerupe)	Te Araroa
Hinemaurea ki Wharekahika	Tūwhakairiora	Ngāti Porou (Ngāti Tuere, Te Whānau a Te Aotakī, Te Whānau a Tuwhakairiora)	Hicks Bay
Hinerupe Marae	Hinerupe	Ngāti Porou (Ngāti Tuere, Te Whānau a Hinerupe, Te Whānau a Karuai, Te Whānau a Tuwhakairiora)	Te Araroa
Hurae / Te Kahika Marae	Hurae	Ngāti Porou (Te Whānau a Hinerupe)	Te Araroa
Matahi O Te Tau Marae	Matahī o Te Tau	Ngāti Porou (Te Whānau a Hunaara)	Horoera
Potaka Marae	Te Ēhutu / Te Pae o Ngā Pakanga	Te Whānau-ā-Apanui, Ngāti Porou (Te Whānau a Tapuaeururangi), Te Whānau-ā-Apanui (Te Whānau a Tapaeururangi)	Pōtaka
Punaruku Marae	Te Pikitanga	Ngāti Porou (Ngāti Kahu)	Te Araroa
Tutua or Paerauta	Te Poho o Tamakoro	Ngāti Porou (Ngāi Tamakoro, Ngāti Tuere)	Te Araroa

== See also ==
- Lists of marae in New Zealand
- List of schools in the Gisborne District
