= Waimata Valley =

Valley in Gisborne, New Zealand

Waimatā
- Interactive map of Waimatā
- Coordinates: 38.504224°S 178.056610°E
- Country: New Zealand
- Region: Gisborne District
- Ward: Tairāwhiti General Ward
- Electorates: East Cape; Ikaroa-Rāwhiti (Māori)

Government
  - Territorial authority: Gisborne District Council
  - Mayor of Gisborne: Rehette Stoltz
  - East Cape MP: Dana Kirkpatrick
  - Ikaroa-Rāwhiti MP: Cushla Tangaere-Manuel
- Time zone: UTC+12 (NZST)
  - Summer (DST): UTC+13 (NZDT)
- Postcode: 4073
- Area code: 06

Waimatā is a rural locality in the Gisborne District of New Zealand's North Island. It is located in the Waimatā River valley.

The Rhythm and Vines music festival is located in the valley.

== History ==
English immigrant and former police officer Lee Askew started beef farming in the area in 2015. She claimed to have been inspired to move there by watching British sitcom The Good Life while growing up in Devon.

A mud volcano erupted in the valley in December 2018. A month later, it had covered about 1.2 hectares in white mud and saline water.

The volcanic activity in the valley is believed to be due to movement between the Australian tectonic plate and the Pacific tectonic plate.

== Parks ==
Gray's Bush Scenic Reserve is a conservation reserve owned and operated by Department of Conservation, which includes walkway tracks.
