= Pōtaka =

Village and rural community in Gisborne District of New Zealand

- Settlement
- Interactive map of Pōtaka
- Coordinates: 37.574°S 178.145°E
- Country: New Zealand
- Region: Gisborne District
- Ward: Tairāwhiti General Ward
- Electorates: East Cape; Ikaroa-Rāwhiti (Māori)

Government
  - Territorial authority: Gisborne District Council
  - Mayor of Gisborne: Rehette Stoltz
  - East Cape MP: Dana Kirkpatrick
  - Ikaroa-Rāwhiti MP: Cushla Tangaere-Manuel

Area
  - Total: 3.86 km^{2} (1.49 sq mi)

Population (2023 Census)
  - Total: 117
  - Density: 30.3/km^{2} (78.5/sq mi)
- Postcode(s): 3199

Pōtaka is a village and rural community in Gisborne District of New Zealand's North Island. It marks the northern and western end of the Gisborne District and the Ngāti Porou tribal territory.

The name Pōtaka was made official in November 2021. It means 'spinning top' in the Māori language.

Lottin Point Whakatiri, located north of the main village, features a motel and small reserve.

== Demographics ==
Pōtaka locality covers 3.86 km^{2} (1.49 sq mi). It is part of the East Cape statistical area.

Historical population
Year	Pop.	±% p.a.
2006	138	—
2013	117	−2.33%
2018	96	−3.88%
2023	117	+4.04%

Pōtaka had a population of 117 in the 2023 New Zealand census, an increase of 21 people (21.9%) since the 2018 census, and unchanged since the 2013 census. There were 66 males and 51 females in 39 dwellings. 2.6% of people identified as LGBTIQ+. The median age was 36.8 years (compared with 38.1 years nationally). There were 27 people (23.1%) aged under 15 years, 18 (15.4%) aged 15 to 29, 54 (46.2%) aged 30 to 64, and 18 (15.4%) aged 65 or older.

People could identify as more than one ethnicity. The results were 43.6% European (Pākehā), 71.8% Māori, and 2.6% Asian. English was spoken by 92.3%, Māori by 30.8%, and other languages by 5.1%. No language could be spoken by 2.6% (e.g. too young to talk). The percentage of people born overseas was 7.7, compared with 28.8% nationally.

Religious affiliations were 25.6% Christian, and 7.7% Māori religious beliefs. People who answered that they had no religion were 56.4%, and 10.3% of people did not answer the census question.

Of those at least 15 years old, 12 (13.3%) people had a bachelor's or higher degree, 48 (53.3%) had a post-high school certificate or diploma, and 33 (36.7%) people exclusively held high school qualifications. The median income was $30,300, compared with $41,500 nationally. 6 people (6.7%) earned over $100,000 compared to 12.1% nationally. The employment status of those at least 15 was 33 (36.7%) full-time, 18 (20.0%) part-time, and 9 (10.0%) unemployed.

== Marae ==
The local Pōtaka Marae is a meeting place for Te Whānau-ā-Apanui's hapū of Te Whānau a Rutaia, and the Ngāti Porou hapū of Te Whānau a Tapuaeururangi. It includes a meeting house, known as Te Ēhutu and Te Pae o Ngā Pakanga.

In October 2020, the Government committed $520,760 from the Provincial Growth Fund to upgrade Hinemaurea ki Wharekahika and Pōtaka Marae, creating 12 jobs.

== Education ==
Potaka School is a Year 1-8 co-educational state primary school with a roll of 45 students as of July 2026. The school was established by 1935.
