= Muriwai, Gisborne =

Settlement and rural community in the Gisborne District of New Zealand

Muriwai
- Settlement
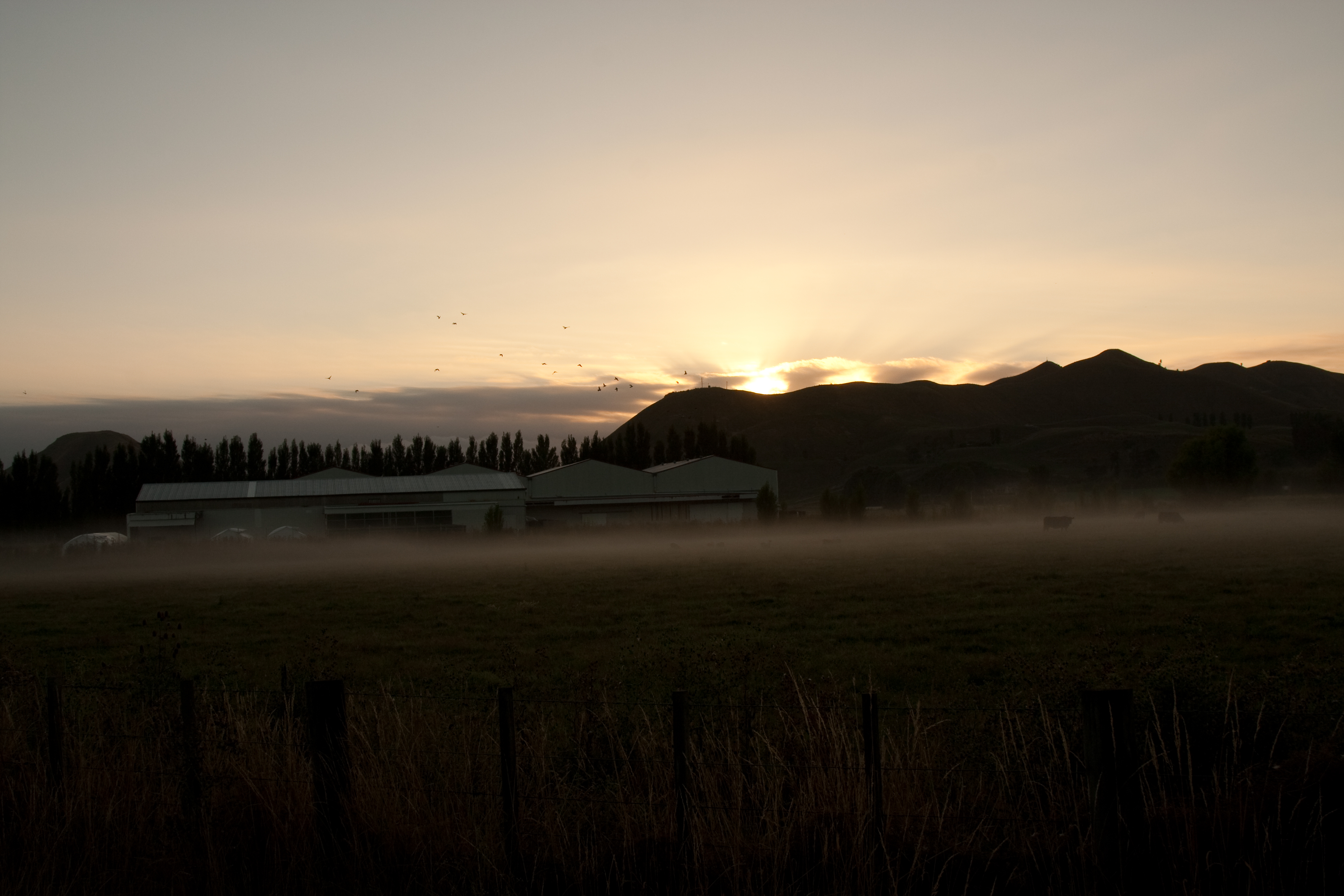
- Sunrise seen from Muriwai, looking towards Young Nick's Head
- Interactive map of Muriwai
- Coordinates: 38.756006°S 177.921311°E
- Country: New Zealand
- Region: Gisborne District
- Electorates: East Coast; Ikaroa-Rāwhiti (Māori)

Government
  - Territorial authority: Gisborne District Council
  - Mayor of Gisborne: Rehette Stoltz
  - Napier MP: Katie Nimon
  - Ikaroa-Rāwhiti MP: Cushla Tangaere-Manuel

Muriwai is a settlement and rural community at the southern end of Poverty Bay, in the Gisborne District of New Zealand's North Island, south of Manutuke. The main settlement is just west of Young Nick's Head. State Highway 2 runs through Muriwai on its way from Gisborne to Hawke's Bay.

The settlement of Muriwai, is also known as Te Muriwai o Whata Contemporary narratives refer to Te Muriwai as "Muriwai-mai-Tawhiti"

== Marae ==
The settlement has two marae, belonging to the Ngāi Tāmanuhiri hapū of Ngāi Tawehi, Ngāti Kahutia, Ngāti Rangitauwhiwhia, Ngāti Rangiwaho and Ngāti Rangiwahomatua: Muriwai Marae and Te Poho o Tamanuhiri meeting house, and Waiari Marae and meeting house.

In October 2020, the Government committed $462,318 from the Provincial Growth Fund to upgrade the marae.

== Education ==
Muriwai School is a Year 1–8 co-educational public primary school, teaching entirely in the Māori language. It had a roll of 60 as of July 2026.
