= Whangara =

Whangara Whāngārā (Māori)
- Town
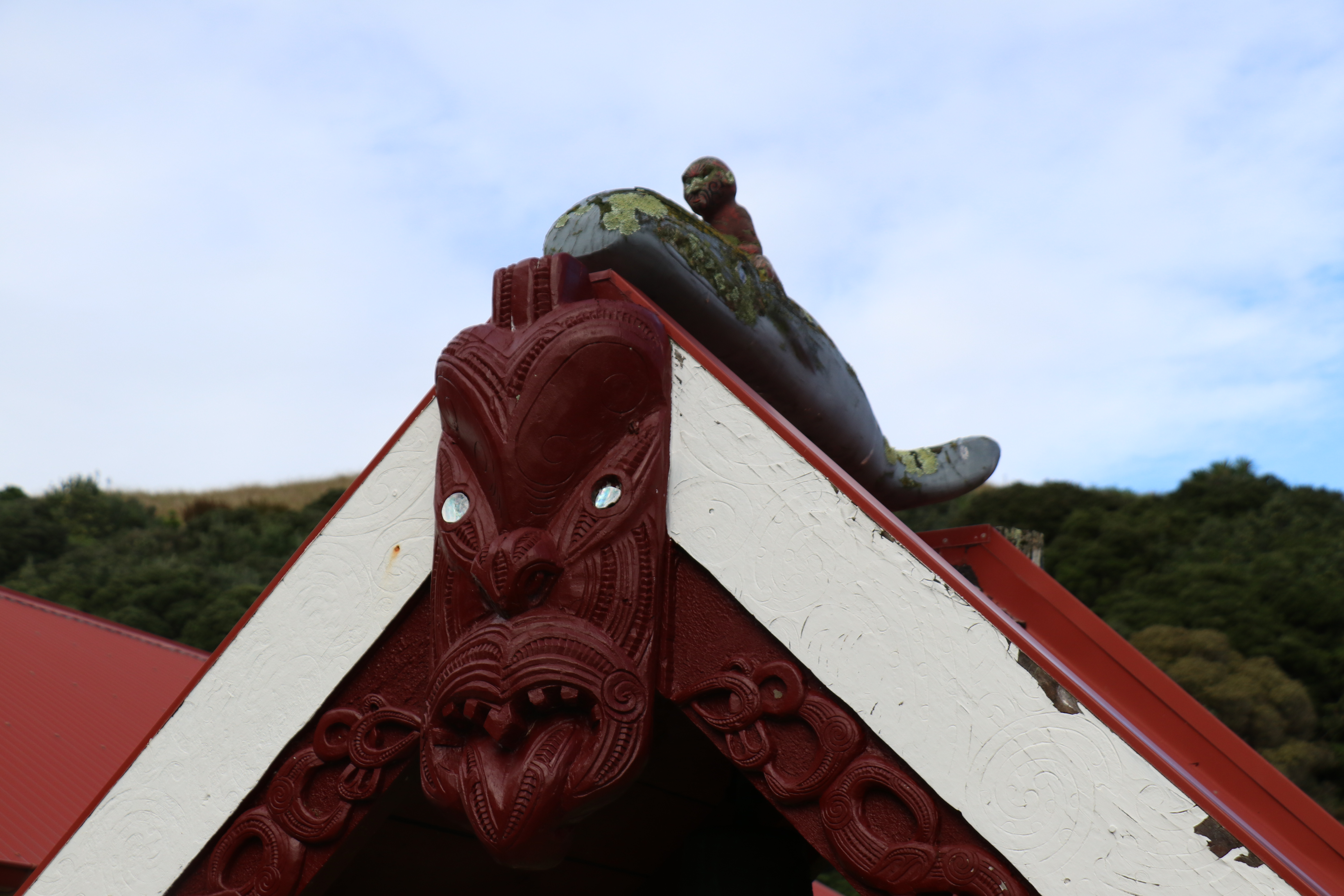
- Carving of Paikea at Whāngārā Marae
- Interactive map of Whangara
- Coordinates: 38°34′14″S 178°13′45″E
- Country: New Zealand
- Region: Gisborne District
- Ward: Tairāwhiti General Ward
- Electorates: East Cape; Ikaroa-Rāwhiti (Māori)

Government
  - Territorial authority: Gisborne District Council
  - Mayor of Gisborne: Rehette Stoltz
  - East Cape MP: Dana Kirkpatrick
  - Ikaroa-Rāwhiti MP: Cushla Tangaere-Manuel

Area
  - Total: 74.05 km^{2} (28.59 sq mi)

Population (2023 Census)
  - Total: 159
  - Density: 2.15/km^{2} (5.56/sq mi)
- Time zone: UTC+12 (NZST)
  - Summer (DST): UTC+13 (NZDT)
- Area code: 06

Whangara (Māori: Whāngārā [ˈfaː.ŋaː.ɾaː]) is a small community in the northeast of New Zealand's North Island, located between Gisborne and Tolaga Bay, five kilometres southwest of Gable End Foreland and two kilometres east of State Highway 35.

The settlement features prominently in the early history of the Ngāti Porou iwi, as the site where Tamatea, captain of the Tākitimu canoe settled on arriving in New Zealand. Canoe races were held at nearby Pikopiko-i-whiti, with the people watching from a hill called Puke-hapopo. The place name may be cognate with Fa'ara on Taha'a island in French Polynesia.

Whangara was the location and setting for Witi Ihimaera's novel The Whale Rider and its film adaptation.

== Demographics ==
Whangara and its surrounds cover 74.05 km^{2} (28.59 sq mi). It is part of the Wharekaka statistical area.

Historical population
Year	Pop.	±% p.a.
2006	150	—
2013	135	−1.49%
2018	147	+1.72%
2023	159	+1.58%

Whangara had a population of 159 in the 2023 New Zealand census, an increase of 12 people (8.2%) since the 2018 census, and an increase of 24 people (17.8%) since the 2013 census. There were 66 males and 93 females in 54 dwellings. 1.9% of people identified as LGBTIQ+. The median age was 35.7 years (compared with 38.1 years nationally). There were 48 people (30.2%) aged under 15 years, 21 (13.2%) aged 15 to 29, 69 (43.4%) aged 30 to 64, and 24 (15.1%) aged 65 or older.

People could identify as more than one ethnicity. The results were 47.2% European (Pākehā), 67.9% Māori, and 7.5% Pasifika. English was spoken by 94.3%, Māori by 34.0%, and other languages by 1.9%. No language could be spoken by 1.9% (e.g. too young to talk). The percentage of people born overseas was 7.5, compared with 28.8% nationally.

Religious affiliations were 32.1% Christian, and 3.8% Māori religious beliefs. People who answered that they had no religion were 52.8%, and 11.3% of people did not answer the census question.

Of those at least 15 years old, 27 (24.3%) people had a bachelor's or higher degree, 63 (56.8%) had a post-high school certificate or diploma, and 24 (21.6%) people exclusively held high school qualifications. The median income was $41,000, compared with $41,500 nationally. 12 people (10.8%) earned over $100,000 compared to 12.1% nationally. The employment status of those at least 15 was 51 (45.9%) full-time, 24 (21.6%) part-time, and 6 (5.4%) unemployed.

== Parks ==
Te Tapuwae o Rongokako Marine Reserve is a marine reserve covering 2,450 hectares of coastline south of Whangara, which is managed by the Department of Conservation. The name means "The footprints of Rongokako," referring to an ancestor of Ngati Kahungunu who is said to have left a footprint at the site.

== Marae ==
The local Whāngārā Marae is a meeting place for the Ngāti Porou hapū of Ngāti Konohi. It includes 2 wharenui, known as Whitirēia and Waho Te Rangi.

In October 2020, the Government committed $49,626 from the Provincial Growth Fund to upgrade the marae, creating an estimated 3.4 jobs.

== Education ==
Whangara School is a Year 1–8 co-educational state primary school with a roll of 85 students as of July 2026. Whangara Native School opened in 1902, and was rebuilt in 1945 after a fire.

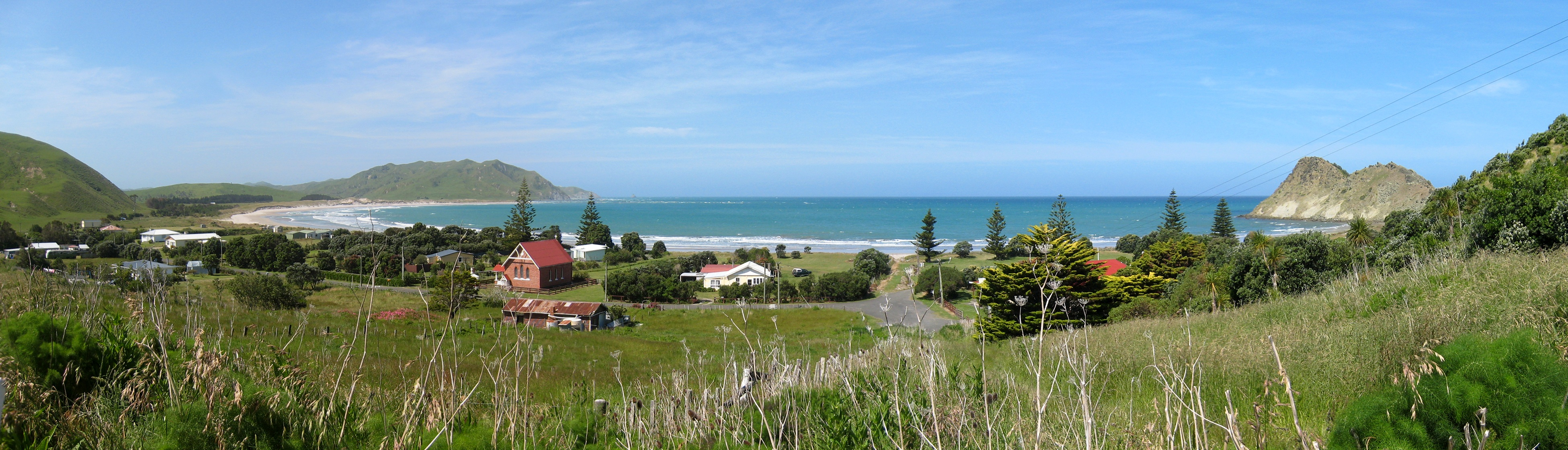
View overlooking Whangara
