= Horoera =

Village and rural community in Gisborne District of New Zealand

- Locality
- Interactive map of Horoera
- Country: New Zealand
- Region: Gisborne Region
- Ward: Tairāwhiti General Ward
- Electorates: East Cape; Ikaroa-Rāwhiti (Māori)

Government
  - Territorial authority: Gisborne District Council
  - Mayor of Gisborne: Rehette Stoltz
  - East Cape MP: Dana Kirkpatrick
  - Ikaroa-Rāwhiti MP: Cushla Tangaere-Manuel

Area
  - Total: 136.05 km^{2} (52.53 sq mi)

Population (2023 Census)
  - Total: 225
  - Density: 1.65/km^{2} (4.28/sq mi)
- Time zone: UTC+12 (NZST)
  - Summer (DST): UTC+13 (NZDT)
- Postcode: 4087
- Area code: 06

Horoera is a village and rural community in Gisborne District of New Zealand's North Island. It is located east of Te Araroa and north of East Cape, at Horoera Point.

It features the Matahi O Te Tau Marae and meeting house, a tribal meeting place of the Ngāti Porou hapū of Te Whānau a Hunaara. The marae is named after the area's fertility.

The community has traditionally been made up of a group of closely related families, whose life centred around the marae. The area's isolation made life difficult for European settlers, and poverty has forced many local Māori to migrate to larger centres.

In 2017, New Zealand Transport Agency upgraded the Horoera Bridge, giving campervans and other heavy vehicles full access to the East Cape Lighthouse. It replaced a temporary Bailey bridge installed in 2015.

In October 2020, the Government committed $5,756,639 from the Provincial Growth Fund to upgrade the marae and 28 others across the Gisborne District. The funding was expected to create 205 jobs.

== Demographics ==
Horoera and its surrounds, which extend south to include Maraehara and east to include East Cape Lighthouse, cover 136.05 km^{2} (52.53 sq mi). It is part of the East Cape statistical area.

Historical population for Horoera and surrounds
| Year | Pop. | ±% p.a. |
|---|---|---|
| 2006 | 258 | — |
| 2013 | 225 | −1.94% |
| 2018 | 204 | −1.94% |
| 2023 | 225 | +1.98% |
The 2006 population is for a larger area of 139.61 km^{2}. Source:

Horoera had a population of 225 in the 2023 New Zealand census, an increase of 21 people (10.3%) since the 2018 census, and unchanged since the 2013 census. There were 108 males and 120 females in 72 dwellings. 1.3% of people identified as LGBTIQ+. The median age was 33.8 years (compared with 38.1 years nationally). There were 63 people (28.0%) aged under 15 years, 39 (17.3%) aged 15 to 29, 87 (38.7%) aged 30 to 64, and 39 (17.3%) aged 65 or older.

People could identify as more than one ethnicity. The results were 26.7% European (Pākehā); 94.7% Māori; 1.3% Pasifika; 1.3% Asian; and 1.3% Middle Eastern, Latin American and African New Zealanders (MELAA). English was spoken by 94.7%, Māori by 54.7%, and other languages by 1.3%. No language could be spoken by 2.7% (e.g. too young to talk). The percentage of people born overseas was 2.7, compared with 28.8% nationally.

Religious affiliations were 42.7% Christian, and 2.7% Māori religious beliefs. People who answered that they had no religion were 42.7%, and 12.0% of people did not answer the census question.

Of those at least 15 years old, 18 (11.1%) people had a bachelor's or higher degree, 99 (61.1%) had a post-high school certificate or diploma, and 51 (31.5%) people exclusively held high school qualifications. The median income was $27,700, compared with $41,500 nationally. 6 people (3.7%) earned over $100,000 compared to 12.1% nationally. The employment status of those at least 15 was 51 (31.5%) full-time, 21 (13.0%) part-time, and 9 (5.6%) unemployed.
