= Makarika =

Rural community and valley in the Gisborne District of New Zealand's North Island

- Interactive map of Makarika
- Coordinates: 37.9515°S 178.2255°E
- Country: New Zealand
- Region: Gisborne District
- Ward: Tairāwhiti General Ward
- Electorates: East Cape; Ikaroa-Rāwhiti (Māori)

Government
  - Territorial authority: Gisborne District Council
  - Mayor of Gisborne: Rehette Stoltz
  - East Cape MP: Dana Kirkpatrick
  - Ikaroa-Rāwhiti MP: Cushla Tangaere-Manuel
- Time zone: UTC+12 (NZST)
  - Summer (DST): UTC+13 (NZDT)
- Postcode: 4081
- Area code: 06

Makarika is a rural community and valley in the Gisborne District of New Zealand's North Island. It is located just south of Ruatoria and Hiruharama, off State Highway 35. The Penu Pā includes a memorial to Private Parekura Makarini McLean, who was killed in combat in Egypt in 1941, during World War II.

A post office operated in the valley from 1930 to 1970. It was operated by the Matariki Station farm for most of that time.

== Marae ==
The area has two marae belonging to hapū of Ngāti Porou iwi. Rongoitekai or Penu Marae and Rongo i te Kai meeting house is a meeting place of Te Aitanga a Mate. Rongohaere or Te Pahou Marae and Rongohaere meeting house is a meeting place of Te Aitanga a Mate and Te Whānau a Rākairoa, and also of Te Whānau-ā-Apanui hapū of Te Whānau a Rutaia.

In October 2020, the Government committed $5,756,639 from the Provincial Growth Fund to upgrade both marae and 27 other Ngāti Porou marae. The funding was expected to create 205 jobs.

== Education ==
Makarika School is a Year 1–8 co-educational state primary school. It had a roll of 25 as of July 2026. The school was established for the Makariki station, and closed in 1925 due to the subdivision of the station. The subdivision resulted in more demand for the school and it was open again by 1928.
