= Rongokako =

New Zealand Māori chief

Rongokako was a New Zealand Māori ariki (chieftain) and tohunga (priest) of the Tākitimu tribal confederation and ancestor of the Ngāti Kahungunu iwi, who is famous for his giant leaps. He is said to have lived at the end of the fourteenth century, about eighteen generations before the mid-twentieth century. Several places along the east coast of the North Island are traditionally connected to him.

== Life ==
Rongokako was the son of Tamatea Arikinui, who captained the Tākitimu canoe from Hawaiki to Aotearoa New Zealand. His mother was Tato, a direct descendant of Toi-kai-rākau, who harnessed Tamatea when he landed at Mauao and thereby forced him to marry her. William Colenso quotes a genealogy naming him as son of Tato and brother of Hikutapuae, Hikitaketake, Rongoiamoa, Taihopi, Taihapoa, Kahutua, Motoro, Te Angi, Kupe, Ngake, Paikea, and Uenuku.

=== Fetching the rimurapa ===
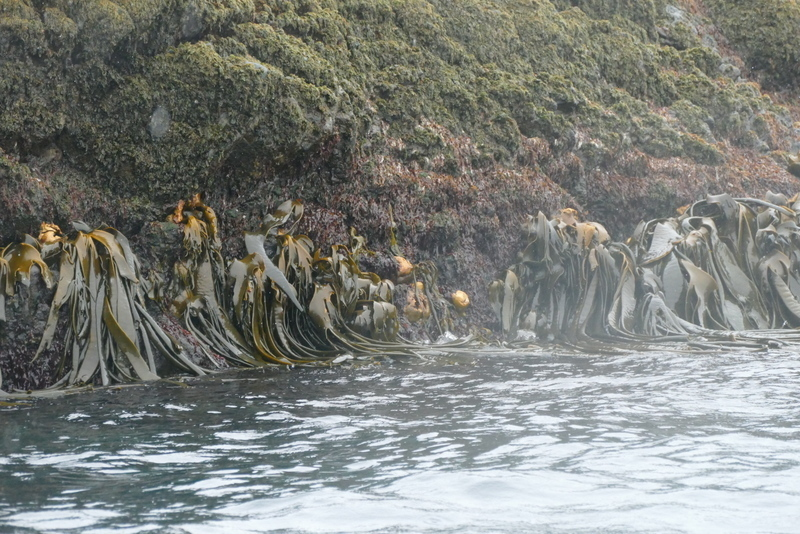
Rimurapa (Durvillaea antarctica) growing on the shore

Rongokako studied at the whare wānanga (school of learning) in Wairarapa under the patronage of Tupai, who had been one of the Tākitimu's tohunga. According to tradition, the Wānanga's final examination required the students to use the karakia (chants) they had learnt in order to make supernatural leaps through the air. To prove that they had mastered this ability, the students had to bring back wet leaves from the rimurapa, a kind of kelp that could be found only on an offshore island. Rongokako was a poor student, so he was barred from taking this test, but when the other students attempted it, they all brought back dried leaves that had washed up on the nearby shore, showing that they had been unable to make the leap to the offshore island, and they all failed. Rongokako successfully performed the karakia, made the leap, and returned with wet rimurapa, thus earning his initiation as a tohunga.

=== Race with Pāoa ===
Places in the race with Pāoa
1 Cape Kidnappers
2 Whangawehi on the Māhia Peninsula
3 Whangara
4 Tāwhiti-a-Pāoa
5 Mount Hikurangi
6 Mount Arowhana
7 Hauraki
8 Horoera

After this, Rongokako decided to court Muriwhenua, who was famous for her beauty. His chief rival was Pāoa and the two decided to race to be the first to her home at Hauraki. Pāoa was a great navigator and – to be sporting – he offered Rongokako a seat in his waka (canoe), which was denied. Rongokako used his leaping power to leap ahead of Pāoa as he sailed up the coast. He first appeared at Cape Kidnappers, then at Whangawehi on the Māhia Peninsula, where marks in the rock are said to be his footprints. On his next leap he reached a place near Whangara, which was therefore named Te Tapuwae o Rongokako ("The footprints of Rongokako"). Then Pāoa realised that Rongokako had the advantage. Accordingly, he set a trap on a hill between Tokomaru Bay and Waipiro Bay, but Rongokako leapt over even this and sprung the trap with his toe. The hill is known as Tāwhiti-a-Pāoa ("Pāoa's snare") because of this. The stick holding the trap open was thrown into the sky and landed in Waikato, where it grew into a tree that still stood as of 1913. Rongokako reached Muriwhenua first and won her hand in marriage. Rongokako and Muriwhenua had one son, Tamatea Urehaea, himself the father of Kahungunu. Through their grandson, they are ancestors of Ngāti Kahungunu and Te Aitanga-a-Māhaki.

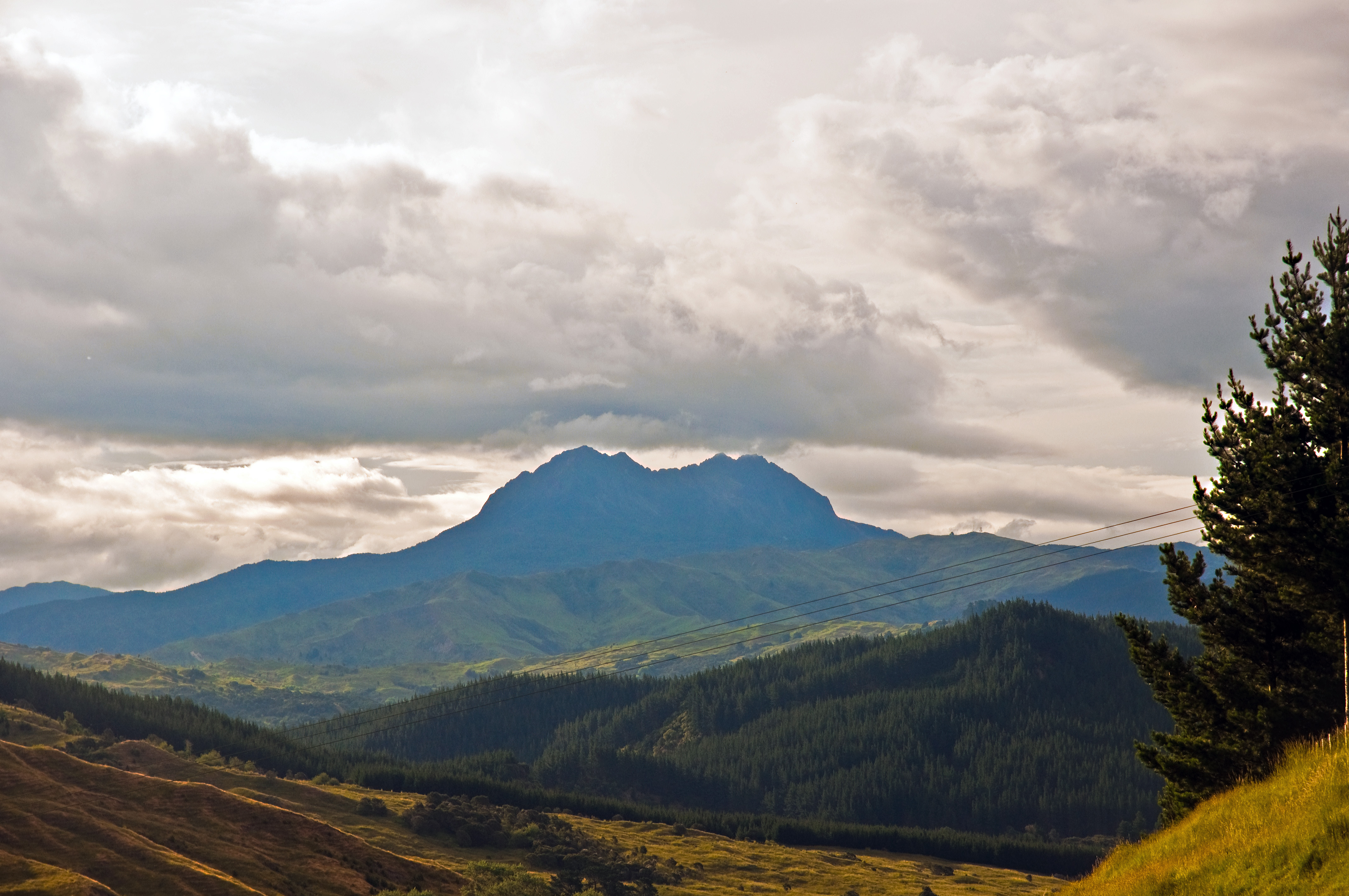
Mount Hikurangi.

In another version of the story, Rongokako possessed a giant magic kiwi, which granted its owner great power. The footprints of this kiwi were said to be visible at the mouth of the Waikanae Creek in Gisborne in 1912. Pāoa wished to capture this kiwi and therefore set a giant snare at Tāwhiti-a-Pāoa, with its base at Mount Hikurangi. Rongokako spotted the trap as he travelled along the route described before and sprang it with his walking stick. It shook upright with such force that Mount Aorangi to break off from Mount Hikurangi and become a separate peak, while the loop of the snare fell to the southwest, becoming Mount Arowhana. Rongokako carried on to Horoera, from which he departed from New Zealand.

=== Death at Te Mata ===
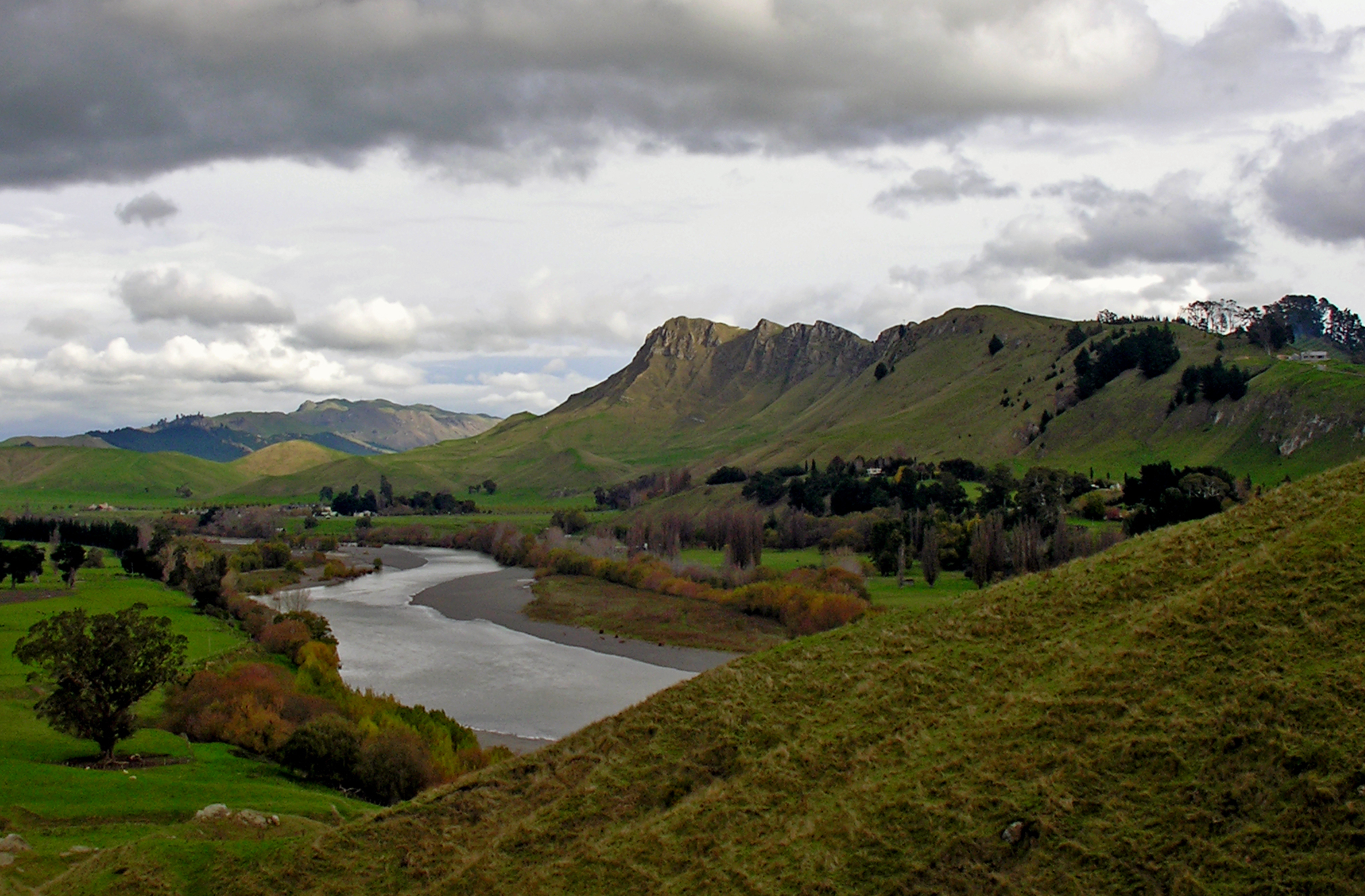
View of Te Mata Peak, the final resting place of Rongokako

In death, Rongokako is associated with Te Mata Peak, whose full name is Te Mata o Rongokako ("the face of Rongokako"). When looking at the peak from the east, it appears to be the silhouette of a person lying down, which is said to be Rongokako.

There are several stories about how he died. In one version, Rongokako started capturing and eating travellers around the Heretaunga Plains, so a young woman from Pakipaki, called Hinerākau was sent to stop him. He fell in love with her and her relatives set him impossible tasks in order to prove his love for her. The last of these tasks was biting through a hill, which caused him to choke and die. A gap in the hills, called Pari Kārangaranga, is said to be Rongokako's bite mark. The heartbroken Hinerākau committed suicide by jumping off Te Mata. A Waimārama story tells this same story, but attributes it to a chief named Te Mata.

In another version from the Gisborne District, Rongokako was sent from Hawaiki to find the Horouta canoe, captained by Pāoa. He found him at Ōhiwa in the Bay of Plenty, but the pair argued over Pāoa's wife and Rongokako fled south, leaving footprints at Wharekahika, Kaiora near Whangara, Nukutaurua on the Mahia peninsula, Cape Kidnappers, and Wellington, where he leapt across Cook Strait and disappeared.

== Sources ==
The story of Rongokako fetching the rimurapa and his race with Pāoa are recounted by J. H. Mitchell (a.k.a. Tiaki Hikawera Mitira) as part of his 1944 history of Ngāti Kahungunu. The version with the kiwi appears in a 1912 article by Colonel Porter. Te Hira Henderson records a number of different accounts of his death from different parts of the East Coast.

== Bibliography ==
- Colenso, William (1879). "On the Moa". Transactions and Proceedings of the Royal Society of New Zealand. 12: 63–108.
- Porter (15 June 1912). "The Giant Rongokako and his Magic Kiwi". Poverty Bay Herald. No. 39.12790. p. 3.
- Mitchell, J. H. (2014). Takitimu: A History of Ngati Kahungunu. Libro International. ISBN 978-1-877514-72-2.
- Royal, Te Ahukaramū Charles (2007). "Stories of people and land". Te Ara: The Encyclopedia of New Zealand.
- Whaanga, Piripi (20 February 2021). "Rongokako's name is missing from Te Mata Peak's entrance. It cannot be erased". The New Zealand Herald.
- Henderson, Te Hira (13 January 2023). "The many stories behind Rongokako". NZ Herald.
