= Manutūkē =

Settlement in Gisborne District, New Zealand

Manutūkē Manutūkē
- Settlement
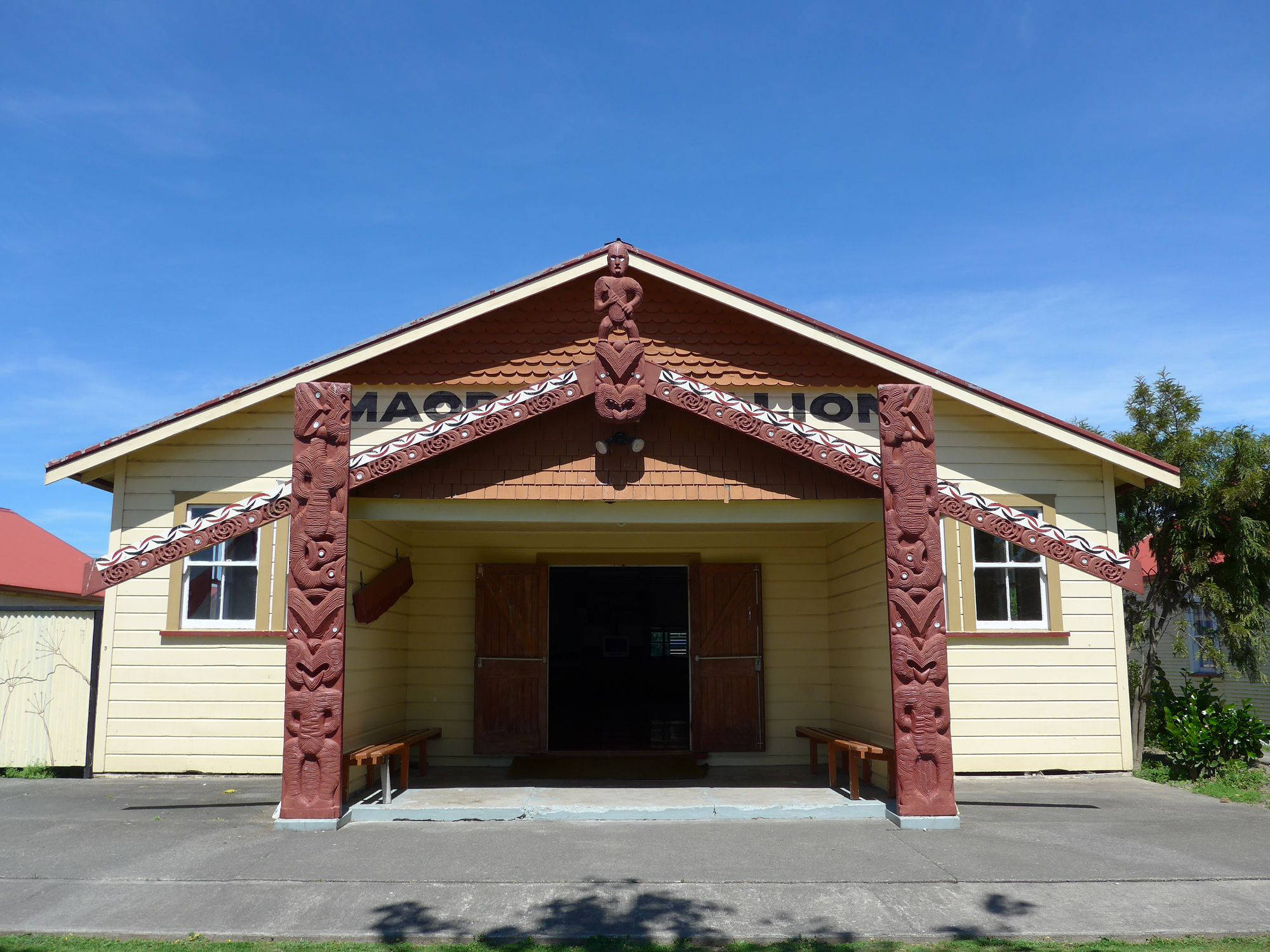
- Māori Battalion Hall at Manutūkē Marae
- Interactive map of Manutūkē
- Country: New Zealand
- Region: Gisborne District
- Ward: Tairāwhiti General Ward
- Electorates: East Cape; Ikaroa-Rāwhiti (Māori)

Government
  - Territorial authority: Gisborne District Council
  - Mayor of Gisborne: Rehette Stoltz
  - East Cape MP: Dana Kirkpatrick
  - Ikaroa-Rāwhiti MP: Cushla Tangaere-Manuel

Area
  - Total: 9.81 km^{2} (3.79 sq mi)

Population (June 2025)
  - Total: 460
  - Density: 47/km^{2} (120/sq mi)
- Postcode(s): 4072

Manutūkē is a settlement in the Gisborne District of New Zealand's North Island. It is located to the west of the city of Gisborne on State Highway 2, close to the mouth of the Waipaoa River.

The name was officially modified to include macrons in 2021.

== Demographics ==
Stats NZ describes Manutūkē as a rural settlement, which covers 9.81 km^{2} (3.79 sq mi). It had an estimated population of 460 as of June 2025, with a population density of 47 people per km^{2}. It is part of the larger Te Arai statistical area.

Historical population for Manutūkē
Year	Pop.	±% p.a.
2006	420	—
2013	384	−1.27%
2018	402	+0.92%
2023	453	+2.42%

Manutūkē had a population of 453 in the 2023 New Zealand census, an increase of 51 people (12.7%) since the 2018 census, and an increase of 69 people (18.0%) since the 2013 census. There were 231 males and 222 females in 153 dwellings. 1.3% of people identified as LGBTIQ+. The median age was 42.5 years (compared with 38.1 years nationally). There were 90 people (19.9%) aged under 15 years, 78 (17.2%) aged 15 to 29, 195 (43.0%) aged 30 to 64, and 93 (20.5%) aged 65 or older.

People could identify as more than one ethnicity. The results were 37.7% European (Pākehā), 76.8% Māori, 7.3% Pasifika, and 0.7% Asian. English was spoken by 95.4%, Māori by 32.5%, Samoan by 0.7%, and other languages by 2.6%. No language could be spoken by 3.3% (e.g. too young to talk). New Zealand Sign Language was known by 0.7%. The percentage of people born overseas was 7.3, compared with 28.8% nationally.

Religious affiliations were 39.7% Christian, 7.3% Māori religious beliefs, 0.7% New Age, and 1.3% other religions. People who answered that they had no religion were 42.4%, and 9.9% of people did not answer the census question.

Of those at least 15 years old, 69 (19.0%) people had a bachelor's or higher degree, 204 (56.2%) had a post-high school certificate or diploma, and 84 (23.1%) people exclusively held high school qualifications. The median income was $32,900, compared with $41,500 nationally. 27 people (7.4%) earned over $100,000 compared to 12.1% nationally. The employment status of those at least 15 was 183 (50.4%) full-time, 42 (11.6%) part-time, and 12 (3.3%) unemployed.

=== Te Arai statistical area ===
Te Arai statistical area, which also includes Pātūtahi, covers 54.68 km^{2} (21.11 sq mi) and had an estimated population of 1,310 as of June 2025, with a population density of 24 people per km^{2}.

Historical population for Te Arai
Year	Pop.	±% p.a.
2006	1,179	—
2013	1,056	−1.56%
2018	1,128	+1.33%
2023	1,287	+2.67%

Te Arai had a population of 1,287 in the 2023 New Zealand census, an increase of 159 people (14.1%) since the 2018 census, and an increase of 231 people (21.9%) since the 2013 census. There were 681 males and 606 females in 417 dwellings. 1.4% of people identified as LGBTIQ+. The median age was 38.3 years (compared with 38.1 years nationally). There were 288 people (22.4%) aged under 15 years, 210 (16.3%) aged 15 to 29, 567 (44.1%) aged 30 to 64, and 225 (17.5%) aged 65 or older.

People could identify as more than one ethnicity. The results were 49.4% European (Pākehā); 62.5% Māori; 7.5% Pasifika; 0.7% Asian; 0.5% Middle Eastern, Latin American and African New Zealanders (MELAA); and 1.4% other, which includes people giving their ethnicity as "New Zealander". English was spoken by 95.8%, Māori by 23.1%, Samoan by 1.9%, and other languages by 3.3%. No language could be spoken by 2.3% (e.g. too young to talk). New Zealand Sign Language was known by 0.5%. The percentage of people born overseas was 10.0, compared with 28.8% nationally.

Religious affiliations were 34.3% Christian, 0.2% Islam, 6.1% Māori religious beliefs, 0.5% New Age, and 0.9% other religions. People who answered that they had no religion were 49.4%, and 9.3% of people did not answer the census question.

Of those at least 15 years old, 159 (15.9%) people had a bachelor's or higher degree, 576 (57.7%) had a post-high school certificate or diploma, and 264 (26.4%) people exclusively held high school qualifications. The median income was $35,000, compared with $41,500 nationally. 75 people (7.5%) earned over $100,000 compared to 12.1% nationally. The employment status of those at least 15 was 528 (52.9%) full-time, 150 (15.0%) part-time, and 30 (3.0%) unemployed.

== Parks ==
Te Araroa Domain is Manutūkē's sports ground.

== Marae ==
The area has four marae belonging to the hapū of Rongowhakaata:

- Manutuke Marae and Te Poho o Rukupo or Te Poho o Epeha meeting house is a meeting place of Ngāti Kaipoho.
- Ohako Marae and Te Kiko o te Rangi meeting house is a meeting place of Ngāi Tāwhiri and Ruapani.
- Pāhou Marae and Te Poho o Taharakau meeting house is a meeting place of Ngāti Maru.
- Whakato Marae and Te Mana o Turanga meeting house is also a meeting place of Ngāti Maru.

In October 2020, the Government committed $1,466,370 from the Provincial Growth Fund to upgrade Ohako Marae, Pāhou Marae and Whakato Marae, creating an estimated 35 jobs. It also committed $1,686,254 to upgrade Manutuke Marae and 5 other Rongowhakaata marae, creating an estimated 41 jobs.

== Education ==
Manutuke School is a Year 1–13 co-educational public school with a roll of 229 as of July 2026.

It was established as Te Arai Native School in 1885. In 2020 it became a designated charter school, teaching partly in the Māori language. It catered for years 1 to 8 until term 2 of 2022, when it expanded to include years 9 and 10. A proposal was made in 2022 that it become a year 1 to 13 composite school and the school has expanded to accommodate years 11 to 13. Three new classrooms were announced in 2025.

== Notable people ==
- Petera Te Hiwirori Maynard (c.1893–1969), shearer, trade unionist and community leader
