= Hicks Bay =

Town in Gisborne District, New Zealand

Wharekahika / Hicks Bay
- Town
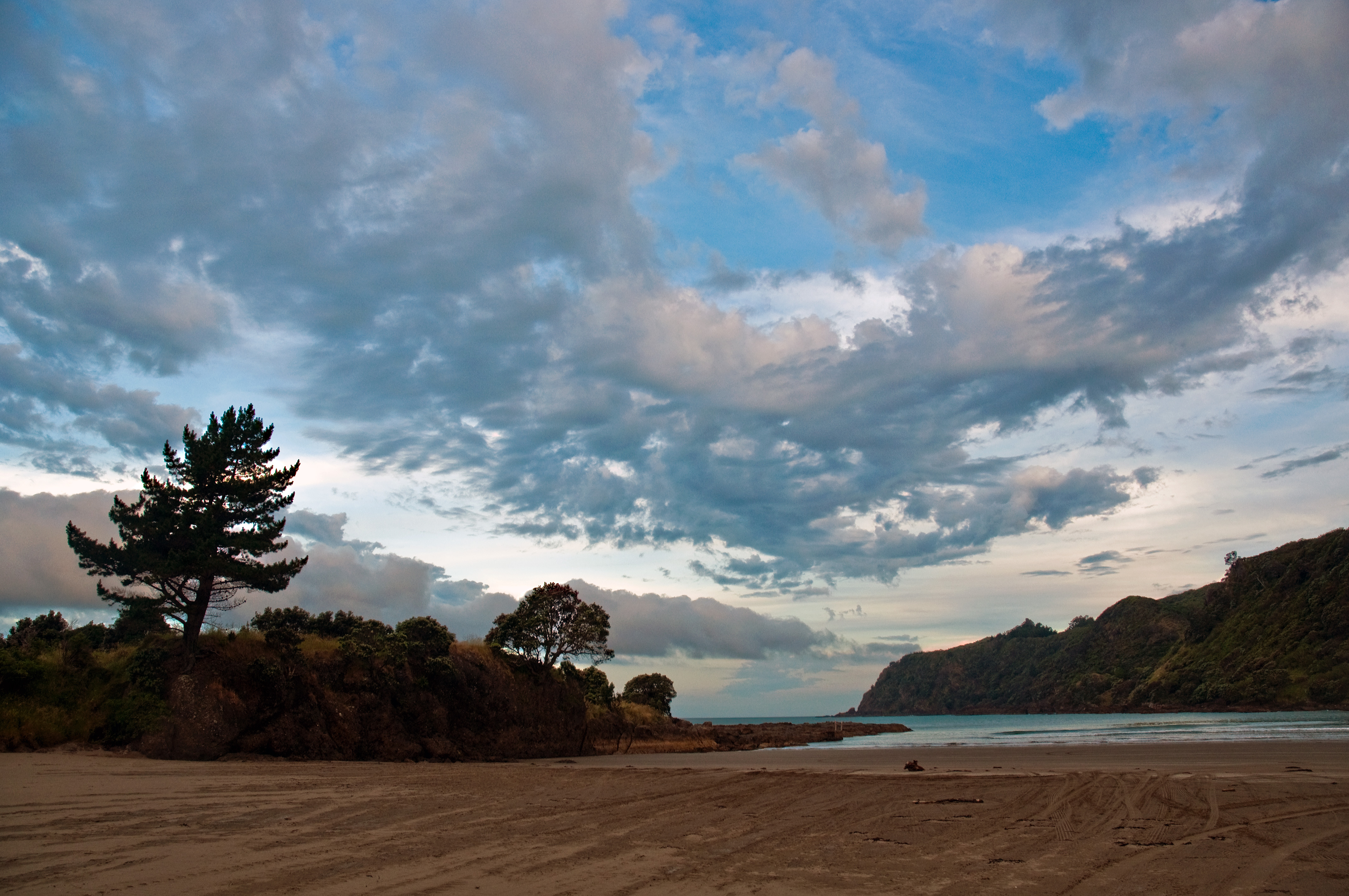
- Interactive map of Wharekahika / Hicks Bay
- Coordinates: 37°36′S 178°18′E
- Country: New Zealand
- Region: Gisborne District
- Ward: Tairāwhiti General Ward
- Electorates: East Cape; Ikaroa-Rāwhiti (Māori)

Government
  - Territorial authority: Gisborne District Council
  - Mayor of Gisborne: Rehette Stoltz
  - East Cape MP: Dana Kirkpatrick
  - Ikaroa-Rāwhiti MP: Cushla Tangaere-Manuel

Area
  - Total: 1.28 km^{2} (0.49 sq mi)

Population (June 2025)
  - Total: 190
  - Density: 150/km^{2} (380/sq mi)
- Postcode(s): 4087

Hicks Bay or Wharekahika (officially Wharekahika / Hicks Bay) is a bay and coastal area in the Gisborne District of the North Island of New Zealand. It is situated 150 km east of Ōpōtiki and 186 km north of Gisborne city, along State Highway 35 between Potaka and Te Araroa.

The area is named after Zachary Hickes, second-in-command of James Cook's Endeavour, which sailed along the East Cape on 31 October 1769. On 10 June 2019, the name of the bay was officially changed to Wharekahika / Hicks Bay.

== Demographics ==
Stats NZ describes Hicks Bay as a rural settlement, which covers 1.28 km^{2} (0.49 sq mi). It had an estimated population of 190 as of June 2025, with a population density of 148 people per km^{2}. It is part of the larger East Cape statistical area.

Historical population
Year	Pop.	±% p.a.
2006	147	—
2013	153	+0.57%
2018	162	+1.15%
2023	186	+2.80%

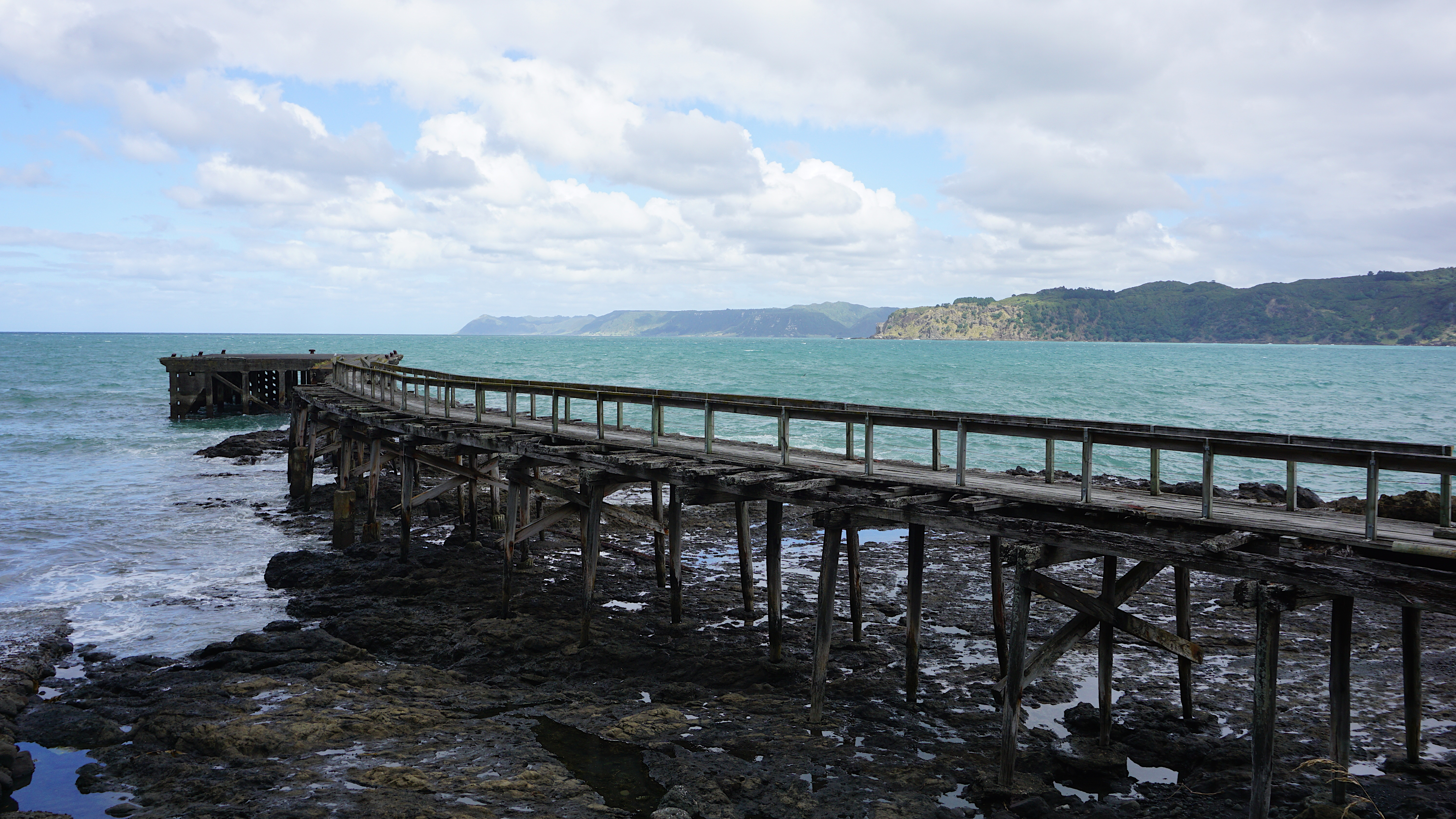
Dilapidated wharf at Hicks Bay

Hicks Bay had a population of 186 in the 2023 New Zealand census, an increase of 24 people (14.8%) since the 2018 census, and an increase of 33 people (21.6%) since the 2013 census. There were 90 males, 93 females, and 3 people of other genders in 48 dwellings. 1.6% of people identified as LGBTIQ+. The median age was 25.7 years (compared with 38.1 years nationally). There were 60 people (32.3%) aged under 15 years, 39 (21.0%) aged 15 to 29, 63 (33.9%) aged 30 to 64, and 21 (11.3%) aged 65 or older.

People could identify as more than one ethnicity. The results were 19.4% European (Pākehā), 95.2% Māori, 3.2% Pasifika, 1.6% Asian, and 3.2% other, which includes people giving their ethnicity as "New Zealander". English was spoken by 93.5%, Māori by 38.7%, and other languages by 3.2%. No language could be spoken by 1.6% (e.g. too young to talk). The percentage of people born overseas was 3.2, compared with 28.8% nationally.

Religious affiliations were 27.4% Christian, 3.2% Māori religious beliefs, and 1.6% other religions. People who answered that they had no religion were 62.9%, and 3.2% of people did not answer the census question.

Of those at least 15 years old, 12 (9.5%) people had a bachelor's or higher degree, 63 (50.0%) had a post-high school certificate or diploma, and 48 (38.1%) people exclusively held high school qualifications. The median income was $23,800, compared with $41,500 nationally. 6 people (4.8%) earned over $100,000 compared to 12.1% nationally. The employment status of those at least 15 was 48 (38.1%) full-time, 15 (11.9%) part-time, and 3 (2.4%) unemployed.

== Climate ==
Climate data for Hicks Bay, elevation 46 m (151 ft), (1991–2020 normals, extremes 1990–present)
Month	Jan	Feb	Mar	Apr	May	Jun	Jul	Aug	Sep	Oct	Nov	Dec	Year
Record high °C (°F)	30.6 (87.1)	31.8 (89.2)	26.5 (79.7)	24.5 (76.1)	23.0 (73.4)	20.6 (69.1)	18.9 (66.0)	18.8 (65.8)	20.2 (68.4)	22.6 (72.7)	24.8 (76.6)	26.3 (79.3)	31.8 (89.2)
Mean daily maximum °C (°F)	22.0 (71.6)	22.6 (72.7)	21.4 (70.5)	19.5 (67.1)	17.3 (63.1)	15.3 (59.5)	14.4 (57.9)	14.8 (58.6)	15.8 (60.4)	17.1 (62.8)	18.4 (65.1)	20.4 (68.7)	18.3 (64.8)
Daily mean °C (°F)	18.8 (65.8)	19.4 (66.9)	18.2 (64.8)	16.3 (61.3)	14.2 (57.6)	12.1 (53.8)	11.4 (52.5)	11.6 (52.9)	12.7 (54.9)	13.9 (57.0)	15.2 (59.4)	17.3 (63.1)	15.1 (59.2)
Mean daily minimum °C (°F)	15.5 (59.9)	16.2 (61.2)	14.9 (58.8)	13.0 (55.4)	11.1 (52.0)	9.0 (48.2)	8.4 (47.1)	8.4 (47.1)	9.6 (49.3)	10.8 (51.4)	12.0 (53.6)	14.2 (57.6)	11.9 (53.5)
Record low °C (°F)	7.0 (44.6)	7.8 (46.0)	6.3 (43.3)	2.9 (37.2)	0.6 (33.1)	1.2 (34.2)	0.9 (33.6)	1.0 (33.8)	2.2 (36.0)	1.7 (35.1)	2.9 (37.2)	5.7 (42.3)	0.6 (33.1)
Average rainfall mm (inches)	79.2 (3.12)	100.2 (3.94)	106.1 (4.18)	101.0 (3.98)	140.2 (5.52)	168.2 (6.62)	160.0 (6.30)	137.2 (5.40)	99.5 (3.92)	99.8 (3.93)	77.4 (3.05)	102.5 (4.04)	1,371.3 (54)
Source: NIWA

== Marae ==
The local Hinemaurea ki Wharekahika Marae is a meeting place for the Ngāti Porou hapū of Ngāti Tuere, Te Whānau a Te Aotakī and Te Whānau a Tuwhakairiora. It includes the Tūwhakairiora meeting house.

In October 2020, the Government committed $520,760 from the Provincial Growth Fund to upgrade Hinemaurea ki Wharekahika Marae and Pōtaka Marae, creating 12 jobs.

== Education ==
Te Kura Kaupapa Māori o Kawakawa Mai Tawhiti is a Year 1–13 Māori language immersion school. It had a roll of 84 as of July 2026. The school opened in 2006.

Wharekahika Native School opened in 1887 and became part of the main school system in 1967. It closed in 2004.

Matakaoa, north of Hicks Bay, had a school from 1921 to 1939.
