= Wherowhero Lagoon =

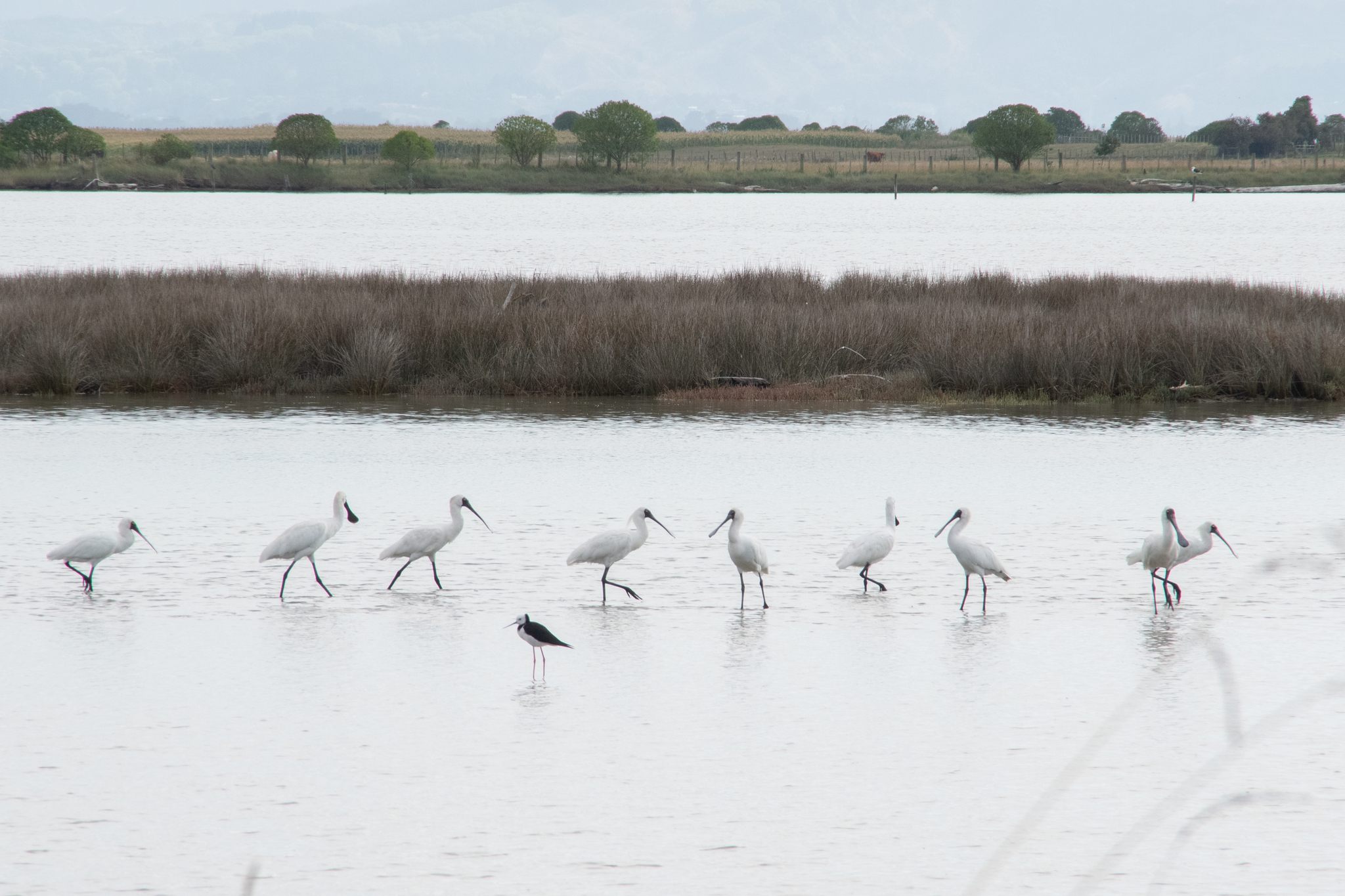
- Royal spoonbills at Wherowhero Lagoon
- Interactive map of Wherowhero Lagoon
- Location: Gisborne District, North Island
- Coordinates: 38.7352°S 177.9341°E
- Primary inflows: Wherowhero Stream, Pākōwhai Stream
- Primary outflows: Tūranganui-a-Kiwa / Poverty Bay
- Surface elevation: 0 m (0 ft)

Wherowhero Lagoon is a lagoon in the Gisborne District of New Zealand. Restoration efforts are currently underway, as a part of a nationwide effort to clean up New Zealand's waterways.
