= Wharerātā =

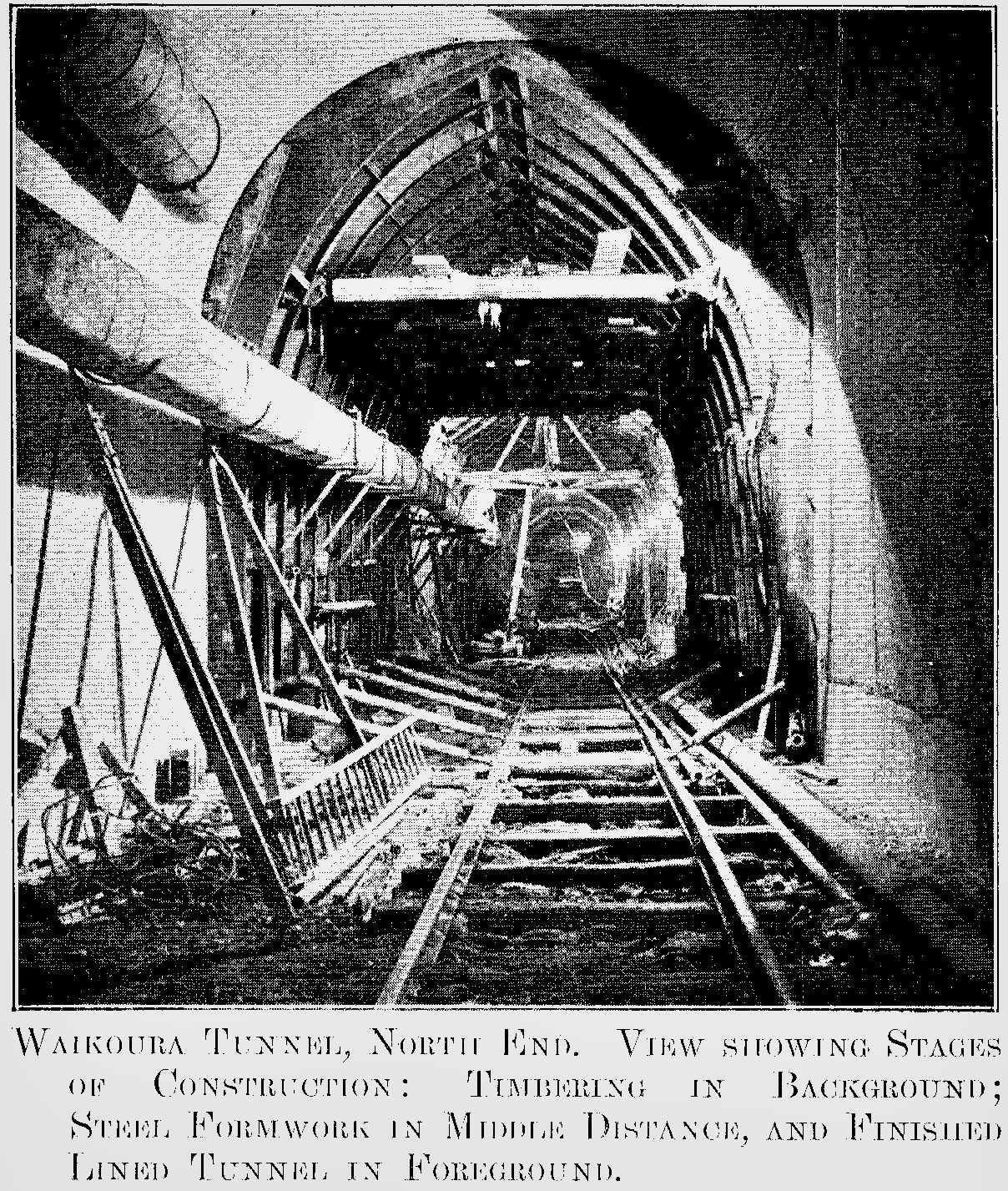
- Waikoura railway tunnell in 1939

- Location within North Island
- Coordinates: 38°52′50″S 177°52′20″E
- Country: New Zealand
- Region: Gisborne
- District: Gisborne District

Government
  - MP: Stuart Nash (Labour)
- Postcode(s): 4078
- Local iwi: Ngāi Tāmanuhiri

Wharerātā or Bartletts is a rural coastal community in the Gisborne District of New Zealand's North Island. It is located on State Highway 2 between Wairoa and Gisborne.

The landscape consists of rocky ranges, with views of the surrounding area.

Since the 19th century the area has been settled by European farmers, who have experienced hardship due to isolation and extreme weather.

An Indian man, who had overstayed his visa, was killed in the Wharerātā Forest in 1993. His remains were found by forestry workers 12 years later.

== Marae ==
The local Rangiwaho Marae is a meeting place for the Ngāi Tawehi, Ngāti Kahutia, Ngāti Rangitauwhiwhia, Ngāti Rangiwaho and Ngāti Rangiwahomatua hapū of the Ngāi Tāmanuhiri iwi. It includes a meeting hall of the same name, and a dining hall built in 2018.

In October 2020, the Government committed $323,107 from the Provincial Growth Fund to upgrade the marae, creating 5.4 jobs.
