= Petera =

Petera is both a given name and surname, a Malagasy and Māori transliteration of the name Peter. Notable people with the name include:

== As a surname ==
- Anne Petera (born 1952), American politician
- Lara Petera (born 1978), New Zealand squash player
- Rostislav Petera (1909–1980), Czechoslovak politician

== As a given name ==
- Petera Te Hiwirori Maynard (1893–1969), Māori community leader
