= Te Araroa (town) =

Town in the Gisborne District of New Zealand

- Town
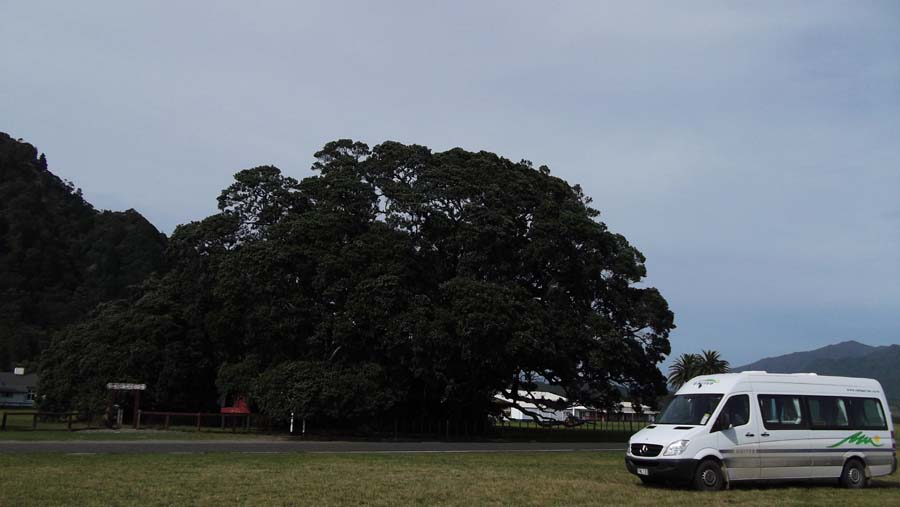
- Interactive map of Te Araroa
- Coordinates: 37°38′S 178°22′E
- Country: New Zealand
- Region: Gisborne District
- Ward: Tairāwhiti General Ward
- Electorates: East Cape; Ikaroa-Rāwhiti (Māori)

Government
  - Territorial authority: Gisborne District Council
  - Mayor of Gisborne: Rehette Stoltz
  - East Cape MP: Dana Kirkpatrick
  - Ikaroa-Rāwhiti MP: Cushla Tangaere-Manuel

Area
  - Total: 1.69 km^{2} (0.65 sq mi)

Population (June 2025)
  - Total: 150
  - Density: 89/km^{2} (230/sq mi)
- Postcode(s): 4087

Te Araroa is a town in the Gisborne District of the North Island of New Zealand. It is 175 km north of Gisborne city, along State Highway 35 between Tokata and Awatere. It is 100 metres from its local beach. Te Araroa is the birthplace of noted Māori politician Sir Āpirana Ngata. Māori in the area are mostly associated with the Ngāti Porou iwi.

The New Zealand Ministry for Culture and Heritage gives a translation of "the long path" for Te Araroa.

The township has a medical centre, general store, takeaways, fire station and police station. In 2006 the local pub, the Kawakawa Hotel was ravaged by a major fire. Recreational facilities include a children's playground, skate park and rugby domain.

== Geography ==
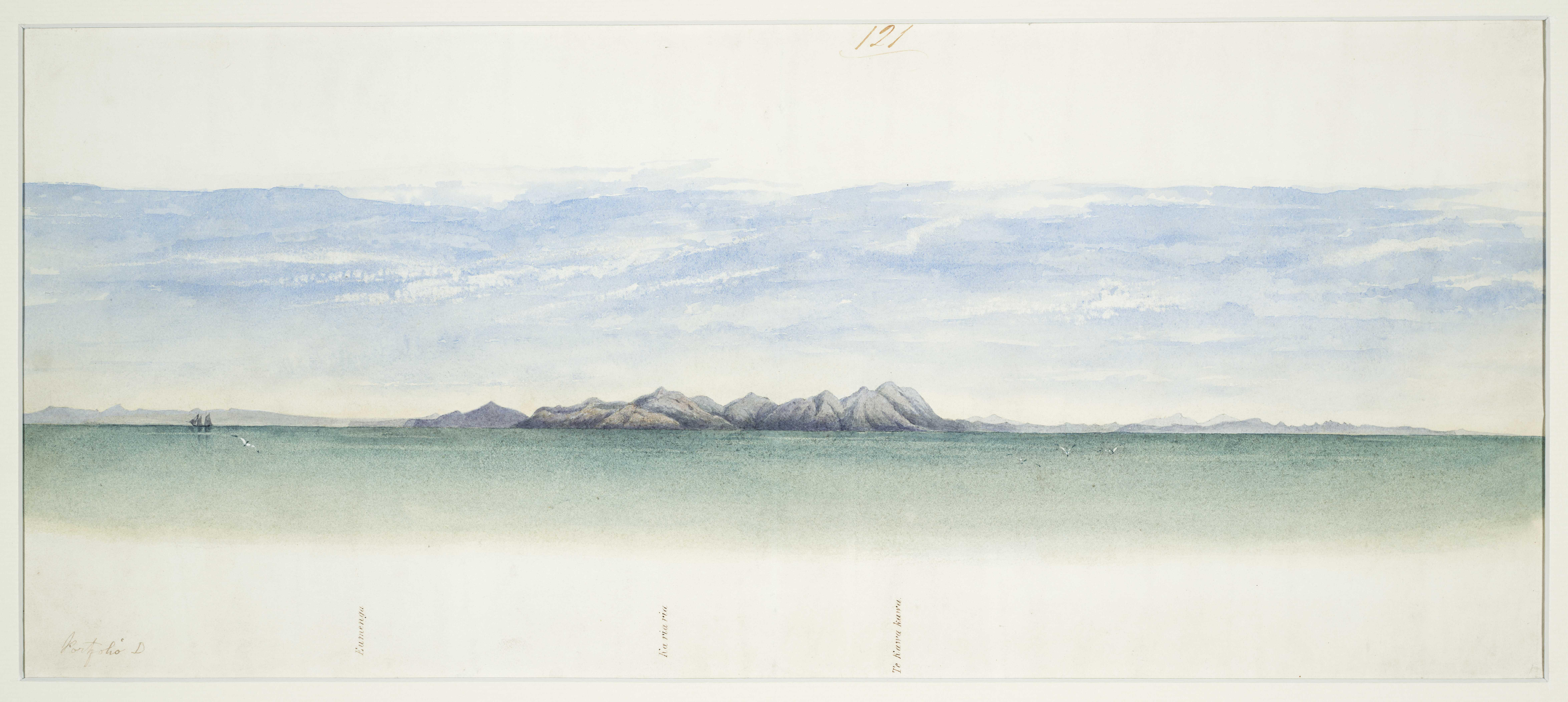
An 1843 painting of Te Araroa by Albert James Allom

Te Araroa sits at the base of Whetumatarau at the south-eastern end of Kawakawa Bay. In the grounds of the local school stands Te Waha o Rerekohu, claimed to be one of the largest pōhutukawa trees (Metrosideros excelsa) in New Zealand. Te Araroa Domain is the settlement's sports ground and local park. There is a motor camp at Punaruku, five minutes drive from the town, at the north-western end of the bay.

== Demographics ==
Stats NZ describes Te Araroa as a rural settlement, which covers 1.69 km^{2} (0.65 sq mi). It had an estimated population of 150 as of June 2025, with a population density of 89 people per km^{2}. It is part of the larger East Cape statistical area.

Historical population
Year	Pop.	±% p.a.
2006	168	—
2013	162	−0.52%
2018	153	−1.14%
2023	144	−1.21%

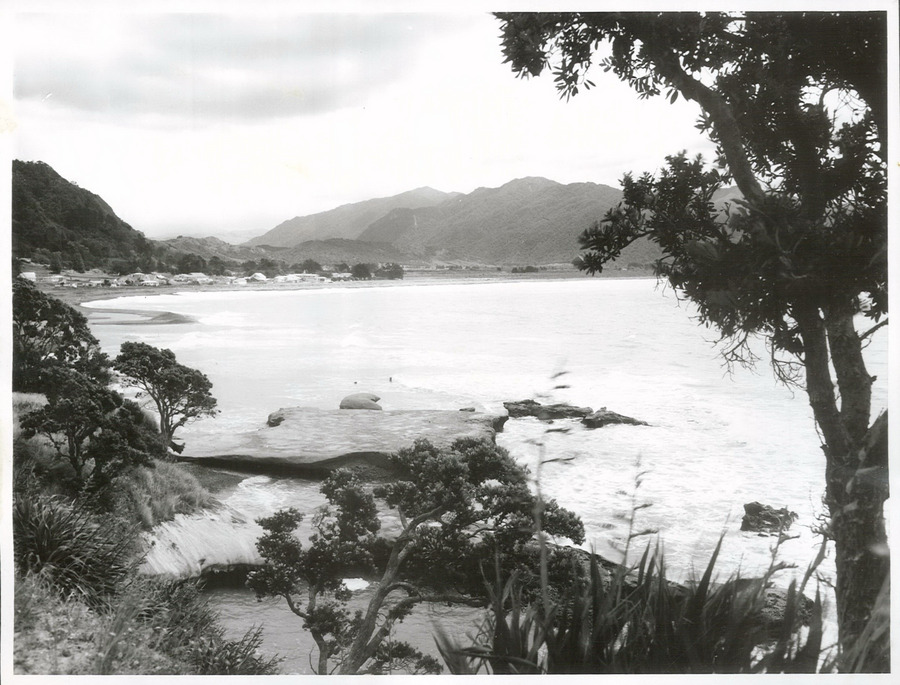
Remote view of Te Araroa in 1971

Te Araroa had a population of 144 in the 2023 New Zealand census, a decrease of 9 people (−5.9%) since the 2018 census, and a decrease of 18 people (−11.1%) since the 2013 census. There were 75 males and 69 females in 57 dwellings. 2.1% of people identified as LGBTIQ+. The median age was 43.6 years (compared with 38.1 years nationally). There were 36 people (25.0%) aged under 15 years, 15 (10.4%) aged 15 to 29, 60 (41.7%) aged 30 to 64, and 33 (22.9%) aged 65 or older.

People could identify with more than one ethnicity. The results were 18.8% European (Pākehā), 91.7% Māori, and 4.2% Pasifika. English was spoken by 97.9%, and Māori by 37.5%. No language could be spoken by 2.1% (e.g. too young to talk). New Zealand Sign Language was known by 2.1%. The percentage of people born overseas was 2.1, compared with 28.8% nationally.

Religious affiliations were 39.6% Christian, and 4.2% Māori religious beliefs. People who answered that they had no religion were 45.8%, and 8.3% of people did not answer the census question.

Of those at least 15 years old, 18 (16.7%) people had a bachelor's or higher degree, 51 (47.2%) had a post-high school certificate or diploma, and 36 (33.3%) people exclusively held high school qualifications. The median income was $27,700, compared with $41,500 nationally. The employment status of those at least 15 was 36 (33.3%) full-time, 15 (13.9%) part-time, and 6 (5.6%) unemployed.

== Marae ==
=== Hinerupe Marae ===
The local Hinerupe Marae and meeting house, located in the township, is a tribal meeting place of the Ngāti Porou hapū of Ngāti Tuere, Te Whānau a Hinerupe, Te Whānau a Karuai and Te Whānau a Tuwhakairiora.

In 1996 an electrical fire destroyed part of Hinerupe Marae. The community rallied to raise funds to build a new marae on the same site as the former 130-year-old building. One major fundraising event The Out of the Ashes Festival saw New Zealand performers Sir Howard Morrison, Dave Dobbyn, Neil Finn and Annie Crummer perform at the Te Araroa Domain. The new marae complex opened on 30 March 2002.

In October 2020, the Government committed $5,756,639 from the Provincial Growth Fund to upgrade the marae and 28 others in the Gisborne District. The funding was expected to create 205 jobs.

=== Other marae ===
Four other Ngāti Porou marae are also located in the valley.

Punaruku Marae and Te Pikitanga meeting house, located north of the township, is a meeting place of Ngāti Kahu.

The Tutua or Paerauta Marae and Te Poho o Tamakoro meeting house, located west of the township, is a meeting place of Ngāi Tamakoro and Ngāti Tuere. It also received Government funding for an upgrade in October 2020.

Hurae or Te Kahika Marae and meeting house, also located south of the township, is also a meeting place of Te Whānau a Hinerupe. It also received Government funding for an upgrade in October 2020.

Awatere Marae and Te Aotaihi meeting house, located south of the township, is a meeting place of Te Whānau a Hinerupe. It received $101,200 from the Provincial Growth Fund in 2020 for upgrade work.

== Education ==
Te Waha o Rerekohu Area School is a Year 1–13 co-educational state area school with a roll of 64 students as of July 2026. It opened in 1874 as Kawakawa Native School, and at various times was called Te Araroa Native School, Te Araroa Native District High School, Te Araroa High School and Rerekohu District High School.
