= Poverty Bay =

Bay on the east coast of New Zealand's North Island

- Tūranganui-a-Kiwa
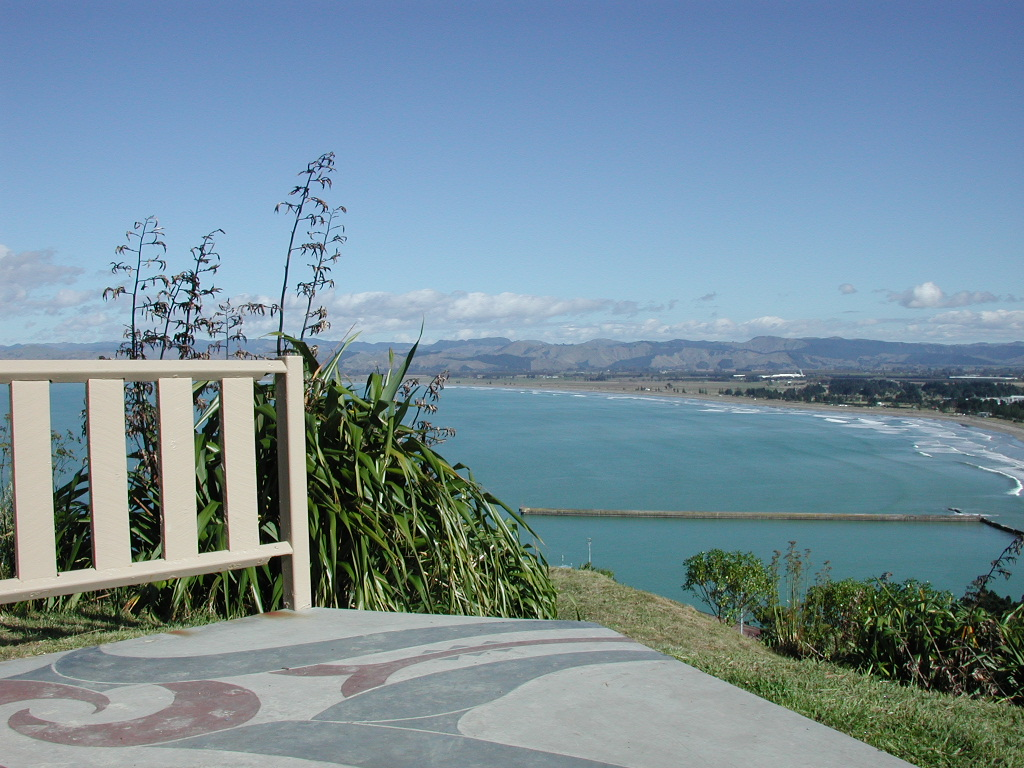
- Poverty Bay from Kaiti Hill
- Interactive map of Poverty Bay
- Location: Gisborne District, New Zealand
- Coordinates: 38.72°S 177.99°E
- River sources: Tūranganui River, Waipaoa River, Wherowhero Lagoon
- Ocean/sea sources: Pacific Ocean
- Basin countries: New Zealand
- Islands: Hāwea Rock, Temoana Rock, Tokomaru Rock, Tuamotu Island
- Sections/sub-basins: Kaiti Beach, Midway Beach, Sponge Bay, Waikanae Beach
- Settlements: Gisborne, Muriwai

Poverty Bay (Māori: Tūranganui-a-Kiwa), officially named Tūranganui-a-Kiwa / Poverty Bay, is the largest of several small bays on the east coast of New Zealand's North Island to the north of Hawke Bay. It stretches for 10 kilometres (6 mi) from Young Nick's Head in the southwest to Tuaheni Point in the northeast. The city of Gisborne is located on the northern shore of the bay and the small settlement of Muriwai is located at the bay's southern end. The name is often used by extension to refer to the entire area surrounding the city of Gisborne.

Poverty Bay is the home of the Māori iwi (tribes) Te Aitanga-a-Māhaki, Rongowhakaata and Ngāi Tāmanuhiri.

== History ==
The first European known to have set foot in New Zealand, Captain James Cook of HMS Endeavour, did so here on 7 October 1769, at which time the bay was known as Teoneroa (te one roa, "the long beach"). This first landing led to the death of local Māori man Te Maro during a skirmish with Cook's crew. Although Cook was able to obtain some herbs to ward off scurvy, he was unable to gain many of the provisions he and his crew needed at the bay, and for this reason gave it the name Poverty Bay. Cook's first choice of name for the inlet, before the conflict, had been Endeavour Bay, as a memorial of the ship's first landing place in New Zealand.

Bay whaling stations operated in the bay during the 19th century.

In 1866, Te Kooti, a Māori rebel leader, and Hauhau followers were incarcerated without trial in the Chatham Islands. Te Kooti and 300 mostly Hauhau warriors overcome the crew of the schooner Rifleman and escaped, with their women and children, from the Chatham Islands to Poverty Bay. They landed at Whareongaonga Bay, near Young Nick's Head. From there, he ventured inland to wage guerilla war on the armed constabulary and sympathetic Maori for several years, as well as several raids on settlers and antipathetic Maori villages. On 10 November 1868, Te Kooti and his followers attacked the township of Matawhero on the outskirts of Gisborne. Some 54 people were slaughtered, including women and children. The dead included 22 local Māori as well as European settlers.

In February 2019, the name of the bay was officially gazetted as "Tūranganui-a-Kiwa / Poverty Bay" by the New Zealand Geographic Board.

== Geography ==
The bay is fed by the Waipaoa River, whose catchment is 2,205 km^{2} (851 sq mi) – large enough for individual storms and events to have a small impact on the sedimentary outflow. The river's alluvial buffering is also minimal, and 95% of sediments are trapped by subduction-related anticlines on the bay's seaward flank. This has led to Poverty Bay becoming a case area for sedimentary studies. The sediments of the bay provide records of changes brought about by the onset of the El Niño–Southern Oscillation about 4,000 years ago, colonisation of New Zealand by Polynesians (and associated deforestation), subsequent deforestation by Westerners, and the Taupo eruption.

Poverty Bay is one of the more fertile areas of New Zealand and famous for its Chardonnay, fruit, vegetables and avocados, with abundant sunshine and fertile alluvial soil.
