= William Fitzgerald Crawford =

William Fitzgerald Crawford (29 April 1844 – 15 December 1915) was a New Zealand storekeeper, brewer, photographer, writer and politician. He served as the first mayor of Gisborne, elected in 1877. He was born in Fortfield, County Tipperary, Ireland on 29 April 1844. During the 1890s and early 1900s Crawford wrote for the Poverty Bay Herald under the pen-name Trix.

In 2025 a collection of 5000 glass plate negatives by Crawford was added to the UNESCO Memory of the World Aotearoa New Zealand Ngā Mahara o te Ao register. The images cover Gisborne and the surrounding district between the years 1874 and 1912.
