= Petera Te Hiwirori Maynard =

Māori community leader (1893–1969)

Petera Te Hiwirori Maynard (c. 1893 – 22 June 1969) was a New Zealand shearer, trade unionist and community leader. Of Māori descent, he identified with the Rongowhakaata iwi. He was born in Manutuke, East Coast, New Zealand on c.1893.
