= Ngāi Tāmanuhiri =

Māori iwi (tribe) in Aotearoa New Zealand

- Iwi (tribe) in Māoridom
- Rohe (region): Gisborne District
- Waka (canoe): Takitimu, Horouta
- Population: 2635 registered members

Ngāi Tāmanuhiri is a Māori iwi of New Zealand and were formerly known by the name of Ngai Tahu, and Ngai Tahu-po respectively. They are descendants of Tahu-nui (also known as Tahu potiki, or Tahu matua) who is also the eponymous ancestor of the Kāi Tahu iwi of Te Waipounamu.

The iwi consists of the descendants of Tamanuhiri and his two principle wives, Rongomaiawhia and Hine-nui-te-po (formerly a wife of hid neighbour Tawake-whakato). The two eldest children of Rongomaiawhia: Tamaraukura, and Paea-o-te-rangi are the primary ancestors of the five major hapū which are: Ngati Rangiwaho Matua, Ngai Tawehi, Ngati Kahutia, Ngati Rangi-tauwhiwhia and Ngati Rangiwaho. These hapū also claim descent from the other children of Tamanuhiri to both of his wives.

== Rohe ==
The rohe (tribal lands) of Ngai Tamanuhiri are located to the south of Poverty Bay in the Gisborne Region of New Zealand. The extent of the Rohe is described as ‘Mai i Paritū ki Koputūtea’ from Paritū (south of Muriwai) to Koputūtea (in the north). Starting at the northern boundary at the former confluence of the Te Arai and Waipaoa River called Koputūtea; following the coastline to Pākirikiri, Te Kowhai-kanga-ora, Papatewhai, Rangihaua, Te Matamata, Ōrongo, Taikawakawa, Whareongaonga and Tikiwhata, then to Paritū. From there it extends inland to Te Toka a Haerengarangi, Whakaumuatetekauae Taumutu, Paritū, Whareongaonga, Tarewauru, Te Toka a Tutekawa along Te Ārai Stream to Karaua thence to Koputūtea. These rohe markers encompass Tawera, Te Taumata o Te Whare o Rata, Kaitoke, Tawatapu, Mātītī, Tawhitinui, Pukehaua, Waikirikiri, Waiari, Waipuna, Waimakaweheru, Mihimarino and Te Kurī a Pawa.

== Hapū and Marae ==
=== Hapū ===
The tribe is now made of five hapū (sub-tribes):

==== Ngāti Rangitauwhiwhia ====
- The Descendants of Rangi-Tauwhiwhia, the eldest child of Tapunga-o-te-rangi

==== Ngāi Tawehi ====
- The Descendants of Tawehi youngest of the three children of Tapunga-o-te-rangi grandson of Paea-o-te-rangi from whom he gains his mana

==== Ngāti Kahutia ====
- Descendants of Kahutia (a grandchild of Tawehi-o-te-rangi from his daughter Te Riu Kahika), he married into the iwi of Rongowhakaata. When Kahutia's grandchild Koroiti died, his nephew Tukareaho (son of Koroiti's sister Te Rongowhatia) returned and burned his body within his house at night. From this event came the name Ngai Tahu-po which was later used as an iwi title particularly by Wi Kaipuke of Ngati Rangiwaho, a leader of the Ngai Tahu-po loyalists who fought against Te Kooti at the battle of Te Karetu

==== Ngāti Rangiwaho-Matua ====
- The Descendants of Rangiwaho I (also known to the Tribe as Rangiwaho Matua), the eldest child of Tamaraukura from whom he gains his mana.

==== Ngāti Rangiwaho ====
- Descendants of Rangiwaho II, a grandson of Rangiwaho I from whom he inherits his Mana

==== Defunct hapū ====
there are also a number of hapū that exist only as branches of the five hapu listed above (but not limited to), such as:

- Ngati Huauri
- Ngati Meke
- Ngati Waipapa
- Ngati Rakai

=== Marae ===
All Hapū (sub-tribes) now share three principal marae (communal grounds) these are located in Muriwai and Tawatapu (Bartletts) respectively:

==== Muriwai ====
- Muriwai Pa (now known as Muriwai marae): location of the historic meeting house Te Poho o Tamanuhiri III
- Waiari Marae

==== Tawatapu ====
- Rangiwaho marae

== Iwi Governance ==
=== Ngai Tāmanuhiri Tutu Poroporo Trust ===
The Tāmanuhiri Tutu Poroporo Trust (TTPT) is a common law discretionary trust and Post Settlement Governance Entity (PSGE) based in Gisborne. TTPT was established under The Ngai Tamanuhiri Deed of Settlement Act 2011 to manage the tribal redress and assets after the settlement of historical Treaty of Waitangi grievances with the crown

The Tamanuhiri Tutu Poroporo Trust's Governance structure consists of a single board of seven members, each of Ngāi Tāmanuhiri descent. TTPT represents the interests of its beneficiaries during issues concerning resource consent under the resource consent act

The tribal area of Ngāi Tāmanuhiri is with the territory of Gisborne District Council, which performs the functions of a district and regional council.

=== Ngāi Tāmanuhiri Whānui Trust ===
Ngāi Tāmanuhiri Whānui Trust represents the iwi's interests under the Māori Fisheries Act and Māori Commercial Aquaculture Claims Settlement Act. It is also based in Gisborne, and governed by the same seven trustees as Tāmanuhiri Tutu Poroporo Trust.

== Media ==
=== Turanga FM ===
Turanga FM is the radio station of Turanganui-a-kiwa iwi, including Ngai Tamanuhiri, Rongowhakaata and Te Aitanga-a-Māhaki. It is based in Gisborne, and broadcasts on 98.1 FM in Ruatoria, and 91.7 FM and 95.5 FM in Gisborne.

== Notable people ==
- Tu Wyllie – rugby union player and politician
- Te Raumoa Balneavis – interpreter and public servant
- Francis Rei Paul Hamon - artist

== See also ==
- List of iwi
