= Dana Kirkpatrick =

New Zealand politician

Dana Kirkpatrick MP
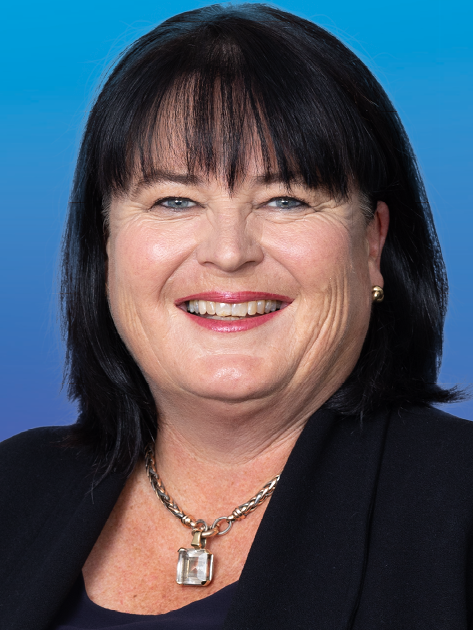
- Kirkpatrick in 2023

Member of the New Zealand Parliament for East Coast
- Incumbent
- Assumed office 14 October 2023
- Preceded by: Kiri Allan

Personal details
- Party: National
- Children: 2

Dana Margot Kirkpatrick is a New Zealand politician, representing the New Zealand National Party as a Member of Parliament since the 2023 New Zealand general election.

== Early life and career ==
Kirkpatrick was born and raised in Gisborne, and is from a farming background. Four generations of her family have lived in Tairāwhiti.

She is of Māori descent.

Before entering politics, she was a Gisborne-based executive and communications professional. Kirkpatrick has also been a journalist, and worked for the Gisborne Herald. She was a spokesperson for the Gisborne Eastwoodhill Arboretum in 2009 when they were seeking a large piece of oak tree for the Ellerslie Flower Show in Christchurch.

Kirkpatrick served as General Manager, then CEO of Equestrian Sports New Zealand (ESNZ) from 2014 to 2021, making significant changes to the organisation's membership policies. Notably, she had to oversee the introduction of a substantial 70% increase in membership fees and other alterations to the membership structures. The membership structure received widespread support and was endorsed by the voting delegates. She also introduced a popular culture change project, drug and alcohol testing and financial reform to ensure the organisation's viability. During her tenure, she was part of the High Performance Sport Blueprint for Change steering group, on the Future of Sport panels and completed the Sport NZ leadership development programme.

== Political career ==
New Zealand Parliament
Years	Term	Electorate	List	Party
2023–2026	54th	East Coast	44	National
2026–present	55th	East Coast	32	National

Kirkpatrick was selected by the National Party to contest the East Coast electorate at the 2023 election. She was 44th on the party list. On election night, Kirkpatrick won by a margin of 3,199 votes, beating Labour's candidate and list MP Tāmati Coffey. The incumbent, Kiri Allan, did not stand for re-election.

During her campaign, Kirkpatrick identified her electorate's recovery from Cyclone Gabrielle as her first priority. She also wants to reduce the regulatory burden on farmers and food producers. In an interview on Radio New Zealand just after the 2023 election Kirkpatrick was asked how she would address people who had in the past voted for Labour's Kiri Allan who resigned in July 2023. Her response was to reassure people that she was prepared to advocate for people 'no matter where they fit in the community'.

"We know that there are significant issues on the East Coast and it's an enormous electorate, 13,800 square kilometres covering from Maketū to Gisborne and everywhere in between. And there are lots of different issues across that region." (Dana Kirkpatrick 2023)

During the 2026 New Zealand general election, Kirkpatrick contested the East Cape electorate for National. She was ranked 32nd on the National Party list. On 7 November, Kirkpatrick retained East Cape by a large margin of 5,325 votes.

== Personal life ==
Kirkpatrick has two children.
