= Mayor of Gisborne =

- Coat of arms of Gisborne

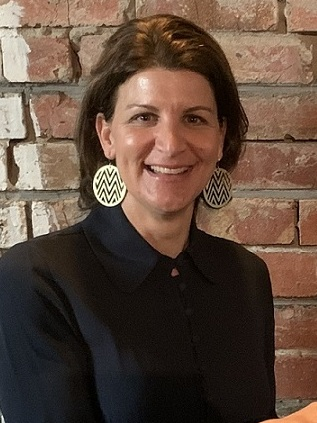
- Incumbent; Rehette Stoltz since 2019
- Style: His/Her Worship
- Term length: Three years, renewable
- Inaugural holder: William Fitzgerald Crawford
- Formation: 1877
- Deputy: Aubrey Ria
- Salary: $158,068
- Website: Official website

The mayor of Gisborne is the elected head of local government in the Gisborne District of New Zealand's North Island, one of 67 mayors in the country. The mayor is based in the principal city (and namesake) of the district, Gisborne. The mayor presides over the Gisborne District Council and is directly elected using the single transferable vote method.

Rehette Stoltz is the current mayor of Gisborne.

== List of mayors of Gisborne ==
^{†} Died in office

	Name	Portrait	Term
1	William Fitzgerald Crawford		1877–1878
2	Thomas William Porter		1878–1881
3	Charles Debenham Bennett		1881–1882
4	Edward Knight Brown		1882–1883
(2)	Thomas William Porter		1883–1884
5	Cecil de Lautour		1884–1885
6	Allan McDonald		1885–1886
7	Henry Lewis		1886
(2)	Thomas William Porter		1886–1887
8	William Tucker		1887–1889
(5)	Cecil de Lautour		1889–1890
9	John Townley		1890–1908
10	Douglas Lysnar		1908–1911
11	William Pettie		1911–1913
12	James Robert Kirk		1913–1914
13	William Grice Sherratt		1914–1919
14	George Wildish		1919–1927
15	Charles Edward Armstrong		1927–1928^{[†]}
16	David Coleman		1928–1933
17	John Jackson		1933–1935
(16)	David Coleman		1935–1941
18	Noel Henry Bull		1941–1950
19	Harry Barker		1950–1977
20	Richard White		1977–1983
21	Hink Healey		1983–1988^{[†]}
–	Brian Crawshaw (acting)		1988–1989
22	John Clarke		1989–2001
23	Meng Foon		2001–2019
24	Rehette Stoltz		2019–present

== List of deputy mayors of Gisborne ==
^{†} Died in office

Name	Term	Mayor
James Robert Kirk	October – November 1909	Lysnar
John Somervell	fl. November 1909	Lysnar
William Pettie	c. May – December 1910	Lysnar
William Pettie	May – August 1911	Lysnar
J. W. Bright	fl. January 1913	Pettie
J. C. Collins	1913–1914 (Note: Collins was originally appointed 'Temporary Chairman' of the Council in late December 1913, given that the mayor, James Robert Kirk, had not appointed a deputy mayor before his departure to the 'South' for a holiday. Collins was subsequently noted as deputy mayor in January 1914.)	Kirk
James Brown	1914–1918^{[†]}	Sherratt
H. E. Hill	1918–1921	Sherratt Wildish
Herbert de Costa	1921–1925	Wildish
Position vacant (1925)		Wildish
Thomas Todd	1925–1927	Wildish
James Blair	1927–1931	Armstrong Coleman
Harold E. Maude	1931–1935	Coleman Jackson
Henry Holmes	1935–1938	Coleman
Jack Hall	1938–1941	Coleman
Herbert de Costa	1941–1947	Bull
Frederick Tolerton	1947–1953	Bull Barker
Reginald Keeling	1953–c. 1958	Barker
J. B. Williams	1959–1962	Barker
L. H. R. Crosby	fl.1965	Barker
E. Lynch	fl.1967	Barker
Unknown	c. 1967–c. 1981	–
Seton Clare	fl.1981	White
Brian Crawshaw	1983–1989	Healey
Unknown	1989–2001	Clarke
Margaret Thorpe	2001–2007	Foon
Nona Aston	2007–2013	Foon
Rehette Stoltz	2013–2019	Foon
Josh Wharehinga	2019–2025	Stoltz
Aubrey Ria	2025–present	Stoltz
