= East Cape (electorate) =

Electorate in New Zealand

East Cape 2026 electorate boundaries

Interactive map of boundaries at the 2026 general election

East Cape is a New Zealand Parliamentary electorate, that existed from 1978 to 1993, and from 2026 onwards.

== Population centres ==
The 1977 electoral redistribution was the most overtly political since the Representation Commission had been established through an amendment to the Representation Act in 1886, initiated by Muldoon's National Government. As part of the 1976 census, a large number of people failed to fill out an electoral re-registration card, and census staff had not been given the authority to insist on the card being completed. This had little practical effect for people on the general roll, but it transferred Māori to the general roll if the card was not handed in. Together with a northward shift of New Zealand's population, this resulted in five new electorates having to be created in the upper part of the North Island. The electoral redistribution was very disruptive, and 22 electorates were abolished, while 27 electorates were newly created (including East Cape) or re-established. These changes came into effect for the 1978 election.

The East Cape electorate was made up of areas that previously belonged to Gisborne (which moved south) and Bay of Plenty (which was abolished). Settlements in the original electorate included Whakatāne, Ōpōtiki, Taneatua, Te Kaha, Tokomaru Bay, Tolaga Bay, and Matawai. The electorate stopped just short of the city of Gisborne, but included the suburb of Kaiti.

Subsequent boundary changes through the 1983 electoral redistribution drew the electorate further from Gisborne and included Kawerau and Murupara.

In 1993, the East Cape electorate was abolished and most of its area was included in the Eastern Bay of Plenty electorate, with the portion from Hicks Bay to the south of Tokomaru Bay included in the Mahia electorate.

== History ==
The East Cape electorate was first won by Duncan MacIntyre of the National Party in 1978, who had previously been the representative for the Bay of Plenty electorate (1975–78). When he retired in 1984, the seat was won by Labour's Anne Fraser with a majority of around 800 votes. She held the seat at the subsequent 1987 election by less than 240 votes, and in 1989, her name officially reverted to her maiden name Anne Collins after she had separated from her husband.

Tony Ryall from the National Party won the seat in the 1990 general election landslide to the National Party.

As part of the Representation Commission Boundary Review in 2025, it was announced that the East Cape electorate would be re-introduced after public consultation for the 2026 election, while retaining the same boundaries of the prior East Coast electorate.

=== Members of Parliament ===
Key

National Labour

Election	Winner
1978 election	Duncan MacIntyre
1981 election	Duncan MacIntyre
1984 election	Anne Fraser
1987 election	Anne Fraser
1990 election	Tony Ryall
Electorate abolished; see Eastern Bay of Plenty
2026 election	Dana Kirkpatrick

== Election results ==
=== 2026 election ===
The next election will be held on 7 November 2026. Candidates for East Cape are listed at Candidates in the 2026 New Zealand general election by electorate § East Cape. Official results will be available after 27 November 2026.

=== 1990 election ===
1990 general election: East Cape
Party	Candidate	Votes	%	±%
National	Tony Ryall	8,169	51.62	
Labour	Dianne Collins	6,201	39.18	
NewLabour	Jim Bennett	797	5.03	
Independent	Tony Eddy	398	2.51	
Social Credit	Gordon MacDonald	196	1.23	
Democrats	Dawn Honana	63	0.39	
Majority		1,968	12.43	
Turnout		15,824	83.16	−5.59
Registered electors		19,027		

=== 1987 election ===
1987 general election: East Cape
Party	Candidate	Votes	%	±%
Labour	Anne Fraser	8,252	49.54	+8.60
National	Wira Gardiner	8,006	48.06	
Democrats	John Rabarts	397	2.38	
Majority		246	1.47	−2.30
Turnout		16,655	88.75	−1.08
Registered electors		18,766		

=== 1984 election ===
1984 general election: East Cape
Party	Candidate	Votes	%	±%
Labour	Anne Fraser	7,365	40.94	
National	Robyn J. Leeming	6,610	36.74	
NZ Party	Alistair Orr	3,209	17.83	
Social Credit	Paul Tairua	679	3.77	
Values	Dudley Kelly	126	0.70	−0.88
Majority		755	3.77	
Turnout		17,989	89.83	+3.19
Registered electors		20,025		

=== 1981 election ===
1981 general election: East Cape
Party	Candidate	Votes	%	±%
National	Duncan MacIntyre	7,962	44.18	−3.39
Labour	Peter Dey	5,998	33.28	
Social Credit	Michael Robinson	3,776	20.95	+3.43
Values	Dudley Kelly	285	1.58	−1.06
Majority		1,964	10.89	−4.42
Turnout		18,021	86.64	+19.28
Registered electors		20,799		

=== 1978 election ===
1978 general election: East Cape
Party	Candidate	Votes	%	±%
National	Duncan MacIntyre	7,868	47.57	
Labour	O P Drabble	5,335	32.25	
Social Credit	Michael Robinson	2,898	17.52	
Values	Dudley Kelly	437	2.64	
Majority		2,533	15.31	
Turnout		16,538	67.36	
Registered electors		24,550		
