= Gisborne District =

District and unitary region of New Zealand

Gisborne District Te Tairāwhiti
- District and unitary region
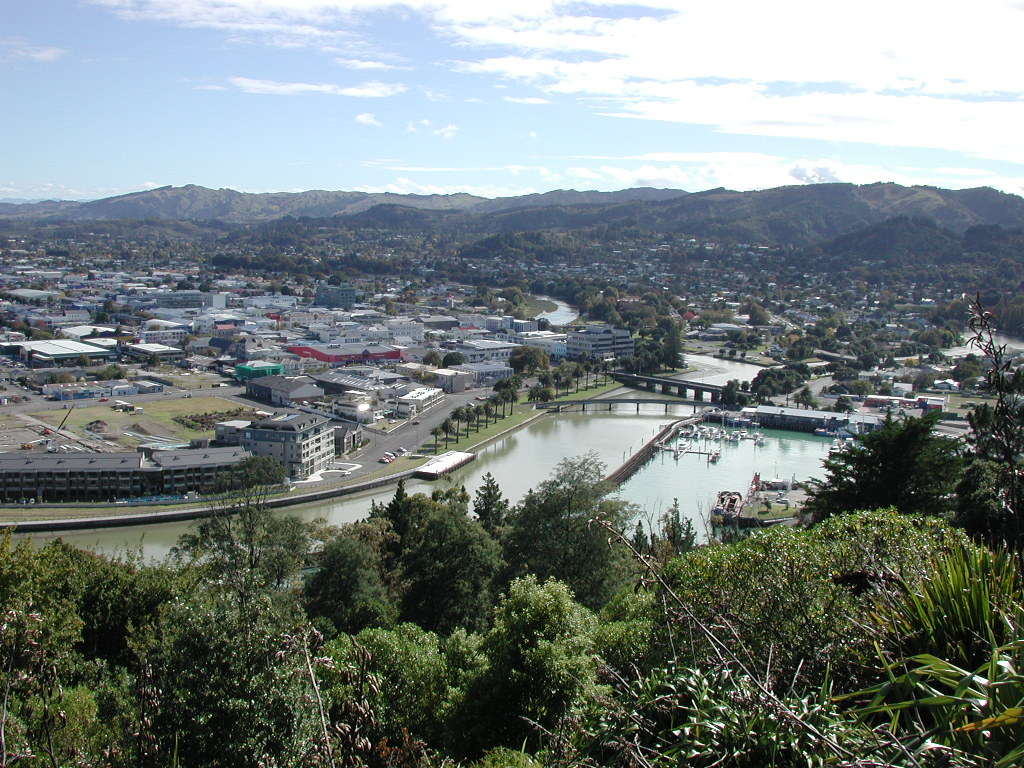

- Gisborne District within New Zealand
- Coordinates: 38°40′00″S 178°01′00″E
- Country: New Zealand
- Island: North Island
- Constituted as local authority district: 1 November 1989
- Seat: Gisborne
- Wards: List: Matakaoa-Waiapu; Waipaoa; Tawhiti-Uawa; Taruheru-Patutahi; Gisborne

Government
  - Body: Gisborne District Council
  - Mayor: Rehette Stoltz
  - Deputy Mayor: Aubrey Ria

Area
  - Land: 8,385.06 km^{2} (3,237.49 sq mi)

Population (June 2025)
  - Territorial: 52,700
  - Density: 6.28/km^{2} (16.3/sq mi)
  - Urban: 38,100

GDP
  - Total: NZ$2.690 billion (2021) (14th)
  - Per capita: NZ$51,833 (2021)
- Area code: 06
- HDI (2023): 0.896 very high · 15th

Gisborne District or the Gisborne Region (Māori: Te Tairāwhiti or Te Tai Rāwhiti) is a local government area of northeastern New Zealand. It is governed by Gisborne District Council, a unitary authority (with the combined powers of a district and regional council). It is named after its largest settlement, the city of Gisborne. The region is also commonly referred to as the East Coast.

The region is commonly divided into the East Cape and Poverty Bay. It is bounded by mountain ranges to the west, rugged country to the south, and faces east onto the Pacific Ocean.

== Government ==
The district is governed by Gisborne District Council, which is a unitary territorial authority, meaning that it performs the functions of a regional council as well as those of a territorial authority (a district or city). It is constituted as both the Gisborne District and the Gisborne Region. It replaced Gisborne City, Cook County, Waiapu County and Waikohu County in a major nationwide reform of local government on 1 November 1989.

== Name and history ==
Prior to the late 19th century, the area was known as Tūranga. However, as the Gisborne town site was laid out in 1870, the name changed to Gisborne, after the Colonial Secretary William Gisborne, and to avoid confusion with the town of Tauranga.

The region was formerly known as the East Coast, although the region is often divided into the East Coast proper (or East Cape), north of the city, and Poverty Bay, the area including and surrounding the city. The region is also sometimes referred to as the East Cape, although that also refers specifically to the promontory at the northeastern extremity. More recently, it has been called Eastland, although that can also include Ōpōtiki in the eastern Bay of Plenty to the northwest, and Wairoa to the south.

Its Māori name Te Tai Rāwhiti means the Coast of the Sunrise, reflecting the fact that it is the first part of the New Zealand mainland to see the sun rise. Gisborne District Council styles the name as Te Tairāwhiti.

== Geography ==
The region is located in the northeastern corner of the North Island. It ranges from the Wharerata Hills in the south, which divide it from Wairoa District in Hawke's Bay, to Lottin Point in the north. The western boundary runs along the Raukumara Range, which separates it from Ōpōtiki District. In the southwest, its boundary runs along the western edge of Te Urewera.

It is sparsely inhabited and isolated, with small settlements mainly clinging to small bays along the eastern shore, including Tokomaru Bay and Tolaga Bay. Its population is 52,700 (June 2025). Three-quarters of the population – 38,100 (June 2025) – lives in the city of Gisborne. No other settlements have a population of over 1000; the largest are the towns of Tolaga Bay and Ruatoria, each with populations of over 800 in 2001.

Inland, the land is rough, predominantly forested, hill country. A spine of rough ridges dominates the centre of the region, culminating in the impressive bulk of the 1752 metre Mount Hikurangi in Waiapu Valley in the region's northeast. Hikurangi is the fifth-highest mountain in the North Island, and the highest that is not a volcano. Regarded as sacred by Māori, there is some justification to the claims that this is the first mountain to see the sun in summer.

The region's population has a higher than the national average proportion of Māori – over 50% in some areas – and maintains strong ties to both Māori tradition and the iwi and marae structure. The predominant iwi are Ngāti Porou, Rongowhakaata, Ngāi Tāmanuhiri and Te Aitanga-a-Māhaki.

=== 2007 earthquake ===
At 8:55 pm (NZDT) on 20 December 2007, the Gisborne region was hit by an earthquake of Richter magnitude 6.8, centred in the Hikurangi Trough which is a part of the Hikurangi Margin. The earthquake was situated 50 km southeast of Gisborne at a depth of 40 km. Mercalli intensities of 7-8 were experienced, with three buildings substantially collapsed in the central business district and others experiencing some structural damage. One death was reported (a heart attack of an elderly woman, sustained during the quake) plus minor injuries.

=== Climate ===
The region is sheltered by high country to the west and has a dry, sunny climate. It has a yearly average of 2,200 sunshine hours. The annual rainfall varies from about 1000 mm near the coast to over 2500 mm in higher inland country. Typical maxima range from 20 to 28 °C in summer and 10-16 °C in winter. Minima vary from 10 to 16 °C in summer to 0-8 °C in winter.

Climate data for Gisborne
Month	Jan	Feb	Mar	Apr	May	Jun	Jul	Aug	Sep	Oct	Nov	Dec	Year
Mean daily maximum °C (°F)	24.9 (76.8)	24.2 (75.6)	22.6 (72.7)	19.9 (67.8)	17.1 (62.8)	14.7 (58.5)	14.1 (57.4)	14.9 (58.8)	16.8 (62.2)	19.0 (66.2)	21.3 (70.3)	23.3 (73.9)	19.5 (67.1)
Mean daily minimum °C (°F)	13.6 (56.5)	13.6 (56.5)	12.2 (54.0)	9.6 (49.3)	6.9 (44.4)	5.3 (41.5)	4.6 (40.3)	5.4 (41.7)	6.8 (44.2)	8.6 (47.5)	10.5 (50.9)	12.3 (54.1)	9.1 (48.4)
Average precipitation mm (inches)	54 (2.1)	78 (3.1)	99 (3.9)	103 (4.1)	97 (3.8)	125 (4.9)	119 (4.7)	93 (3.7)	101 (4.0)	63 (2.5)	65 (2.6)	67 (2.6)	1,064 (42)
Source: NIWA Climate Data

== Demographics ==
Gisborne District covers 8,385.06 km^{2} (3,237.49 sq mi) and had an estimated population of 52,700 as of June 2025, with a population density of 6.3 people per km^{2}.

Historical population
Year	Pop.	±% p.a.
1986	45,768	—
1991	44,361	−0.62%
1996	45,962	+0.71%
2001	43,971	−0.88%
2006	44,499	+0.24%
2013	43,653	−0.27%
2018	47,517	+1.71%
2023	51,135	+1.48%

Gisborne District had a population of 51,135 in the 2023 New Zealand census, an increase of 3,618 people (7.6%) since the 2018 census, and an increase of 7,482 people (17.1%) since the 2013 census. There were 25,326 males, 25,686 females and 123 people of other genders in 17,316 dwellings. 2.3% of people identified as LGBTIQ+. The median age was 36.7 years (compared with 38.1 years nationally). There were 11,382 people (22.3%) aged under 15 years, 9,627 (18.8%) aged 15 to 29, 21,648 (42.3%) aged 30 to 64, and 8,481 (16.6%) aged 65 or older.

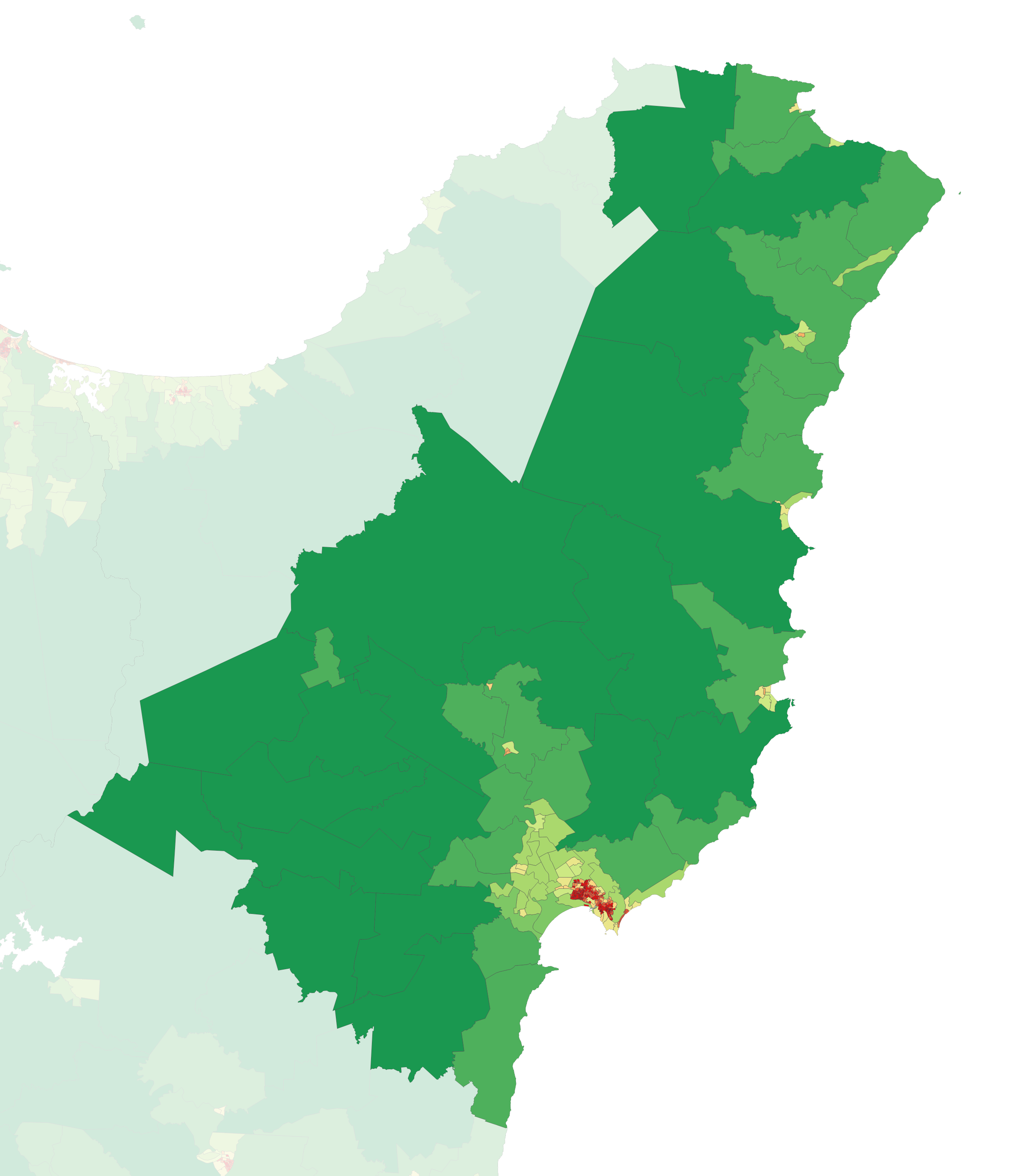
Population density in the 2023 census

People could identify as more than one ethnicity. The results were 56.5% European (Pākehā); 54.8% Māori; 5.6% Pasifika; 3.8% Asian; 0.7% Middle Eastern, Latin American and African New Zealanders (MELAA); and 1.8% other, which includes people giving their ethnicity as "New Zealander". English was spoken by 96.1%, Māori language by 16.9%, Samoan by 0.5% and other languages by 5.8%. No language could be spoken by 2.2% (e.g. too young to talk). New Zealand Sign Language was known by 0.4%. The percentage of people born overseas was 11.6, compared with 28.8% nationally.

Religious affiliations were 31.2% Christian, 0.6% Hindu, 0.3% Islam, 4.6% Māori religious beliefs, 0.4% Buddhist, 0.5% New Age, and 1.2% other religions. People who answered that they had no religion were 53.7%, and 8.1% of people did not answer the census question.

Of those at least 15 years old, 5,187 (13.0%) people had a bachelor's or higher degree, 22,200 (55.8%) had a post-high school certificate or diploma, and 10,800 (27.2%) people exclusively held high school qualifications. The median income was $35,800, compared with $41,500 nationally. 2,727 people (6.9%) earned over $100,000 compared to 12.1% nationally. The employment status of those at least 15 was that 18,867 (47.5%) people were employed full-time, 5,505 (13.8%) were part-time, and 1,590 (4.0%) were unemployed.

In the 2018 census, 77.6% of the population could speak in one language only, 18.9% in two languages and 1.1% in three or more languages.

=== Urban areas ===
Gisborne, with a population of 38,100, is the only urban area in the district with a population over 1,000. It is home to 72.3% of the district's population.

Other towns and settlements in the Gisborne district include:

- Hicks Bay
- Manutuke
- Patutahi
- Ruatoria
- Te Araroa
- Te Karaka
- Tokomaru Bay
- Tolaga Bay

== Economy ==
The subnational gross domestic product (GDP) of the Gisborne region was estimated at NZ$2.16 billion in the year to March 2019, 0.7% of New Zealand's national GDP. The regional GDP per capita was estimated at $44,004 in the same period.

== Arts ==
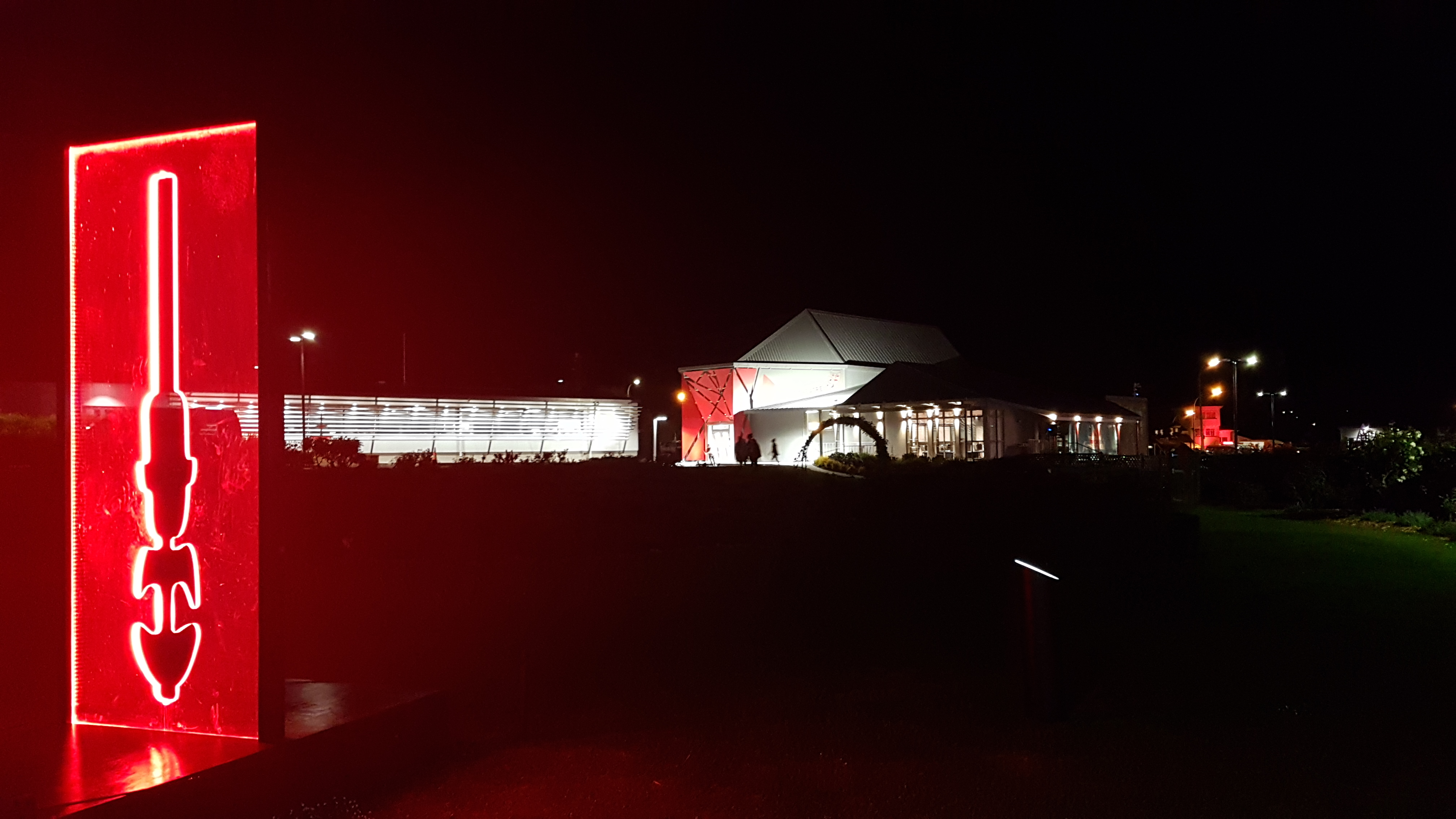
Te Tairāwhiti Arts Festival 2020.

There are a number of notable creative people from the Gisborne region, including writer Witi Ihimaera, opera singer Dame Kiri Te Kanawa and actor George Henare.

An annual arts festival began in 2019 called Te Tairāwhiti Arts Festival. In 2020, this included a series of light installations along the river in Gisborne city showcasing ten local artists.

== Sport ==
The region is represented in rugby union by the East Coast Rugby Football Union and the Poverty Bay Rugby Football Union.

== See also ==
- 2006 Tonga earthquake
- List of marae in the Gisborne District
- List of people from Gisborne
- List of schools in the Gisborne District
