= Gisborne District Council =

Unitary authority of New Zealand

Gisborne District Council Te Kaunihera o Te Tairāwhiti

- Established: 1 November 1989

Leadership
- Mayor: Rehette Stoltz
- Deputy Mayor: Aubrey Ria

Structure
- Seats: 14 seats (1 mayor, 13 ward seats)
- Length of term: 3 years

Elections
- Last election: 11 October 2025
- Next election: 2028

Meeting place
- Gisborne

Website
- gdc.govt.nz

Gisborne District Council (Māori: Te Kaunihera o Te Tairāwhiti) is the unitary authority for the Gisborne District of New Zealand. The council consists of a mayor and 13 ward councillors. The district consists of the city of Gisborne and a largely rural region on the east coast of the North Island.

== Structure ==
Gisborne District Council is a unitary territorial authority, which means that it performs the functions of a regional council as well as those of a territorial authority (a district or city). The area it governs is constituted as both the Gisborne District and the Gisborne Region.

The council consists of a mayor and 13 elected councillors. Nine councillors are elected from the Gisborne Ward, and one each from the four wards of Matakaoa-Waiapu, Taruheru-Patutahi, Tawhiti-Uawa and Waipaoa.

Under the elected members, there is an appointed chief executive officer, 4 department managers and approximately 250 staff. The council chambers and main administration centre is in Fitzherbert Street, in the Whataupoko suburb, just across the Taruheru River from the Gisborne Central business district.

The current mayor is Rehette Stoltz.

== History ==
Gisborne District Council was established on 1 November 1989 as part of a major nationwide reform of local government. It replaced the councils of Gisborne City, Cook County, Waiapu County and Waikohu County, East Cape United Council, East Cape Catchment Board and Regional Water Board, East Coast Pest Destruction Board, two harbour boards, and several noxious plants authorities and recreation reserve boards. It was the only unitary authority in New Zealand until three others were created in 1992.

County councils had been formed in 1876, with the abolition of the Auckland Provincial Council. Uawa County had split off from Cook County in 1918, but merged back in 1964.

Gisborne District Council had 16 councillors and 11 wards in 1989. It reduced to 15 councillors and 7 wards (including Matakaoa and Waiapu) in 1995, to 14 councillors in 1998, then 13 councillors and 5 wards in 2013.

In late September 2023, the Gisborne District Council attracted significant domestic media attention after an animal control officer accidentally euthanised a pet dog named "Sarge" with a bolt gun, having mistaken him for another impounded dog. The Council apologised to Sarge's owners Logan and Piri, and reached a settlement with them. The animal control officer also resigned. Sarge's owners have called for a nationwide ban on bolt guns, and for the Council to leave calling cards, and to assign euthanasing to a humane third party.
