= Waiapu County =

County in New Zealand

Coordinates: 38°3′21″S 178°18′19″E

- County of New Zealand
- 1890–1989
- Capital: Te Puia Springs
- Area
  - 1896: 2,903.4 km^{2} (1,121.0 sq mi)
  - 1956: 2,053.9 km^{2} (793.0 sq mi)
- Population
  - 1891: 379
  - 1896: 447
  - 1927: 5,110
  - 1956: 6,250
  - 1986: 4,628
- History
  - Established: 1890
  - Disestablished: 1989
- Today part of: Gisborne Region
- Population and area data from The New Zealand Official Yearbook.

Waiapu County was a county governed by the Waiapu County Council on the North Island of New Zealand from 1890 until the council was merged with other councils to form Gisborne District Council in 1989.

== Development under difficulties ==
NB: This section is derived from text in Mackay, Joseph Angus (1949). Historic Poverty Bay and the East Coast, N.I., N.Z, available here at the New Zealand Electronic Text Centre.

The Waiapu County, which then included the area which became Matakaoa County, was formed in 1890. Its first council comprised: E. H. Henderson, W. Milner, A. H. Wallis, Travers, Connolly and White. At a meeting at Port Awanui on 27 December 1890, Mr. Henderson was elected chairman.

In March 1874, there were only 32 European residents on the East Coast above Uawa—9 males and 3 females in the Te Araroa district, and 13 males and 7 females in Waiapu. By 1878 the number of pākehā had risen to 109. The 1906 census showed 858 Europeans and 2,611 Maoris. Previously, the native census had been taken on a tribal basis. In 1926 (exclusive of Matakaoa) the figures were: Europeans, 1,809; Maoris, 3,292; and, in 1945: Europeans, 1,641; Maoris, 4,341, plus 3 per cent, representing residents absent on war service.

The Guide to Travellers section of the Poverty Bay Almanac for 1884 contained a warning to visitors to Waiapu not to attempt to pass round headlands where there was no track. Mention is made of a track from Waipiro Bay to the hot springs at Te Puia, and of another leading to Makarika. From Tuparoa a track led to the oil springs at Rotokautuku, branching off to Wai-o-matatini. There was also a track from Port Awanui to Wai-o-matatini. In October 1884, the Poverty Bay Independent praised the development work which was being undertaken by Mr. J. N. Williams and Sir George Whitmore. "There is already a movement among the dry bones of Tawhiti," it remarked, "and, to-day, the district is alive with the voices of labourers." It added: "Smallholders could not possibly make any strides in the work of converting those wilds into pleasant and verdant pastures."

It was not until 1894 that steps were taken to effect appreciable improvements to the old native track leading north from Tolaga Bay along the Hikuwai River. A contract was then let to D. Malone to form a road 1.8 metres (6 ft) wide for a distance of 13 kilometres (8 mi). C. H. McCracken and a mate squared the timber for several 2.4-metre-wide (7.9-foot) bridges. Manuka was used for the stringers, studs, caps and sills; manuka fascines, bound with wire, for the decking and sheathing; and logs for wheel guards. Some attention was next given to the track leading over the hill into Tokomaru Bay. When the council raised a loan of NZ£10,000 for road works in 1901, very considerable improvements were made to the inland route. By February 1902, drays could make the journey from Tolaga Bay to Tokomaru Bay.

Floods have, on several occasions, done considerable damage to roads and bridges. The greatest setback was suffered in May 1916, when the overall damage was estimated at £30,000. Both the Tikitiki bridge (opened in February 1914) and the Rotokautuku bridge (then only recently erected) were damaged. The Tikitiki bridge was again extensively damaged in February 1917. A further flood, in March 1918, swept away four of the spans, and the site was abandoned.

Phenomenal rains at Tokomaru Bay on 21–22 January 1917, caused the Mangahauini Stream to rise to a record level in a few hours. Part of W. G. Keane's home was undermined, A. N. Wilkins's wool-scouring works was demolished, and two bridges were swept away. At Waima, Edgar A. R. Louis (20 years old), who lived in a tent, was drowned. When Mr. and Mrs. Hanlon had to leave their home, the husband took charge of their 18-months-old infant, but it slipped from his grasp when he became entangled in a fence, and was swept out to sea.

In the heyday of development on the East Coast, shipping was an essential industry. All inward goods and outward produce had to be "surfed" at Tokomaru Bay, Waipiro Bay, Tuparoa, Port Awanui, Te Araroa and Hicks Bay. In the case of Tolaga Bay, small craft could enter the river. Tolaga Bay, Tokomaru Bay, Te Araroa and Hicks Bay were, later, equipped with wharf facilities.

== "Ghost" townships ==
NB: This section is derived from text in Mackay, Joseph Angus (1949). Historic Poverty Bay and the East Coast, N.I., N.Z, available here at the New Zealand Electronic Text Centre.

The pattern of a large section of the East Coast was completely altered by the diversion of traffic from the coastline to the inland route. For many years, Port Awanui had three hotels, a courthouse, a police station, a post office, three stores and a wool store. Nothing now remains to indicate that it was once a very busy locality. Tuparoa had two hotels, a post office, two large stores, a boarding-house, stables, smithy, wool store and dumping shed. It, too, has been shorn of most of its former glory. Waipiro Bay (for many years the county headquarters) has lost two of the three large stores which it formerly boasted, besides a wool store, saddler's shop and a smithy. On the other hand, Ruatoria has blossomed from a sparsely settled junction known as "The Cross Roads" into a substantial township, and Te Puia (now the county headquarters) has become a popular spa.

Tokomaru Harbour Board is the only harbour board in New Zealand that has never levied a harbour rate. In 1911, it built a wharf at a cost of £10,000, and, in 1914, made substantial improvements. [A jetty had been built at Te Ariuri in 1906. Mr. McCracken (who carried out the work) used large manuka trunks obtained from "Mangaroa" for piles. A wool store was then erected, and a dumping plant installed.] In 1925, some rocks were removed, enabling vessels drawing up to 3.51 m (11 ft 6 in) to berth. Two years later, the board bought the New Zealand Shipping Co.'s brick wool sheds, etc., for £13,000. A new wharf and approach were built in 1940 at a cost of £28,300. The port's busiest years were from 1913 to 1916, when 400 vessels (aggregate tonnage, about 400,000) were handled annually. As in the case of other small ports, it suffered a heavy decline in business when—during the Second World War—it was excluded from the itineraries of Home vessels.

Harbour Board Chairmen:

- K. S. Williams, 1910–19;
- G. Kirk, 1920;
- A. B. Williams, 1921–23;
- A. W. Kirk, 1924–26;
- F. J. Williams, 1927–30;
- H. H. Fairlie, 1931;
- J. Busby, 1932–33;
- D. W. W. Williams, 1934;
- J. Busby, 1935–43;
- V. G. H. Rickard, 1944–48;
- F. R. Jefferd, 1948–.
- Captain S. J. Plummer was harbourmaster and secretary from 1912 to 1948;
- W. C. Brydon, secretary, 1948–;
- Captain P. W. C. McCallum, harbourmaster, 1948–.

A severe outbreak of typhoid fever, which necessitated the establishment of a temporary camp at Ruatoria, led to the erection of a small hospital in 1907 at Te Puia. In 1949, a 24-bed "T.B." block, an X-ray block, a new nurses' home and a new kitchen were added at a cost of £57,210. At Tokomaru Bay a small maternity home was opened, but, subsequently, Mr. and Mrs. A. B. Williams made a gift of a fine dwelling at Waipiro Bay for that purpose. In 1948, they presented a modern ambulance to the hospital. The gravest menace that has to be fought by the Health Department and the hospital authorities is tuberculosis among the Maoris. X-ray examinations have been carried out extensively. In 1948, there were two district nurses at Ruatoria and one each at Tolaga Bay, Tokomaru Bay, Tikitiki and Te Araroa.

County Chairmen:

- E. H. Henderson, 1890–91;
- A. H. Wallis, 1891–02;
- T. E. Sherwood, 1902–03;
- A. B. Williams, 1903–09;
- Kenneth Williams, 1909–20;
- G. Kirk, 1920–21;
- A. B. Williams, 1921–24;
- A. W. Kirk, 1924–32;
- D. W. W. Williams, 1932–.

County Clerks:

- W. Harding (acting), 1890;
- G. Boyd, 1890–93;
- W. O'Ryan, 1893–06;
- W. H. Conboy, 1906;
- W. O'Ryan, 1906–09;
- A. P. Durrant, 1909–10;
- A. L. Temple, 1911–36;
- A. G. Hicks, 1936–45;
- J. H. Sutherland, 1945–.

Engineers:

- W. O'Ryan, 1893–09;
- A. K. Gilmour, 1909–42;
- O. N. Winter, 1942–.

From 1890 to 1893 the county offices were at Tuparoa, from 1893 to 1930 at Waipiro Bay, and from 1930 at Te Puia. Rates collected for 1890–91 totalled £513; in 1946–47 the aggregate was £34,070. As at 31 March 1947, the county debt (apart from Harbour Board loans) stood at £57,130, with maturity dates ranging up to 1966. The gross capital value of the county in 1946 was £2,667,971.

== Gold rushes ==
NB: This section is derived from text in Mackay, Joseph Angus (1949). Historic Poverty Bay and the East Coast, N.I., N.Z, available here at the New Zealand Electronic Text Centre.

There were several "gold rushes" in the Waiapu in the early days. In 1874, about 100 natives went prospecting on and around Mount Hikurangi. Sir James Hector, who examined the locality, found no signs of gold. In 1875 "Scotty" Siddons, mate of the Beautiful Star, claimed to have met, on the East Coast, a native who had a few ounces of gold. He and a mate named Hill found a lot of mundic on the north-west side of the mountain, but only outcrops of limestone on the higher slopes. In 1886, Reupane te Ana, of Makarika, discovered what he fondly imagined was an enormous deposit of gold. With noble unselfishness, he let all his friends into the secret. Drays, wheelbarrows and receptacles of all kinds were rushed to the scene, and large quantities of the "precious metal" were removed to a safe place. When it turned out that the metal was only mundic, Reupane became an object of ridicule, and, afterwards, was known as "Tommy Poorfellow."

== Biographical information ==
NB: This section is derived from text in Mackay, Joseph Angus (1949). Historic Poverty Bay and the East Coast, N.I., N.Z, available here at the New Zealand Electronic Text Centre.

Edward Hannam Henderson (born at Worth, Kent, in 1852) came out to New Zealand in 1875. He learned sheep farming in Hawke's Bay under Colonel Herrick and Sir G. Whitmore. In 1880, in conjunction with Swindley and Co., he bought a run in the Bay of Plenty. He moved to the East Coast in 1882, and, with W. G. Stainton, took up Matakaoa run. He had three brothers—all admirals—Sir John Henderson, Sir Reginald Henderson (who planned the first Australian Navy) and Sir William Henderson.

Arthur William Kirk (born at Makaraka in 1874) was the eldest son of Enoch Kirk, one of the pioneers of Tolaga Bay. With his brother George, he engaged in storekeeping at Tuparoa for a number of years. Then he took up land in the Ruatoria district. He served as chairman of Waiapu County Council, Waiapu Hospital Board and Tokomaru Bay Harbour Board. He died on 27 February 1947.

Arthur Henry Wallis (born at Bexhill, England, in 1851) came out to Hawke's Bay in 1868. He was a cadet on William Nelson's station and, then, under J. N. Williams. In 1883 Mr. Williams appointed him manager of Waipiro station, which was then in heavy bush and fern. Under his guidance, much of the property was completely transformed. He was the only justice of the peace for miles around, carried out the duties of lay reader, and, when an accident occurred, was called upon to administer first aid. He represented Waiapu Riding in Cook County, and assisted to promote Waiapu County. In March 1901, he took over Onetohunga and Horehore on his own account. He served, for several terms, on Gisborne Harbour Board, and became prominent in social, business and sporting circles in Poverty Bay. He died on 12 September 1938.

William Busby (born at Bay of Islands in 1841) was the third son of James Busby, the first British Resident for New Zealand. He engaged on survey work in Poverty Bay for some years, and then returned to the Bay of Islands, where he took up sheep farming. In 1885, he moved to Edenham (Hawke's Bay), and, in 1901, he bought Pauariki, Tokomaru Bay. He died on 25 December 1918.

Thomas Sydney Williams (born at the Bay of Islands) was a son of Judge Edward Marsh Williams, of the Native Land Court, and a grandson of Archdeacon Henry Williams. In 1894, he took up the management of Tuparoa run for his uncle (Archdeacon Samuel Williams) and developed methods of stocking and fencing which overcame tauhinu scrub, which had become a grave menace to the establishment of pasture on papa hillslopes. Mrs. Williams was a granddaughter of Archdeacon Henry Williams and of James Busby. Cadets and shepherds always received a warm welcome at their home, "Kaharau." Mr. Williams died on 25 May 1928, and Mrs. Williams on 29 December 1940.

William Oates (born in Durham in 1861) resided at Ōpōtiki for five years before he settled on the East Coast in 1890. For some years, he was a working manager on the Tawhiti portion of J. N. Williams's run. He then established a boarding-house, butchery and bakery, and, later, a storekeeping business at Tokomaru Bay. He served on Waiapu County Council, Waiapu Hospital Board and the Tokomaru Bay Harbour Board, was chairman of the Tokomaru Bay School Committee for 30 years, and, for several terms, held a seat on the Hawke's Bay Education Board. In all forms of sport, especially cricket, he took a keen interest, and was regarded as "The Father of Sport" at Tokomaru Bay. He died on 10 January 1930.

William O'Ryan (born in 1852) was trained as a surveyor and engineer. In addition to practising his profession in Poverty Bay, he also took up bridge building contracts. In 1886, he built the wooden approach to the Gisborne breakwater. For 16 years, he was an engineer in Waiapu County, and, during much of that time, he was also county clerk. A good deal of the road and bridge work carried out under his supervision was badly damaged by floods between 1916 and 1918. He died in Auckland on 2 October 1939.

Upon his retirement in 1946, after fifty years' service as a contractor and/or employee of Waiapu County, Charles H, McCracken was presented with a special letter of appreciation and a substantial gratuity.

== See also ==
- Counties of New Zealand
