= Matakaoa County =

County in New Zealand

Coordinates: 37°38′S 178°22′E

- County of New Zealand
- 1919–1989
- Capital: Te Araroa
- History
  - Established: 1919
  - Disestablished: 1989
- Today part of: Gisborne District

Matakaoa County was one of the counties of New Zealand in what is now the region of Gisborne in the North Island.

== Severe setbacks at outset ==
Matakaoa County was formed in 1919, and the first council meeting was held on 22 May 1920. George Kirk (chairman of Waiapu County) was appointed chairman. His associates were: C. I. B. Beckett, K. F. Reed, Wallace Fletcher Metcalfe (1884–1966), A. E. Kemp, W. Walker, Rēweti Kōhere, H. McClutchie and A. L. Allan. The first clerk was A. Whitehead (later a Judge of the Native Land Court). Metcalfe succeeded Kirk as chairman in 1921, and, five years later, Reed took over the position. Upon Reed's death in 1929, Kemp became chairman. In 1921, D. J. McNaught was appointed clerk.

Early in its career, the county suffered heavy setbacks. It assumed a liability of NZ£15,000 (being part of the Waiapu County's main road and bridges loan) and another of £1,200 in connection with the Te Araroa jetty. Anticipating that the wharfage dues that would be provided by a freezing works that had just been built at Hicks Bay would meet the loan charges, it borrowed £30,000 and built a wharf there. However, the works were closed after the 1925–26 season. By then, the county had also raised several small loans for road works.

The county's revenue was further adversely affected during the depression in the late 1920s and early 1930s. 40% of the county had not left the natives' hands, and only 20% was a European freehold. As many of the residents were unable to meet their rating obligations, the council, in 1932, sought guidance from the Government. On 1 May 1933, the county was placed under C. H. Bull, of Gisborne, as commissioner, but the council was retained as a consultative body. Upon Mr. Bull's death in 1944, D. E. Chrisp, Gisborne, became commissioner, and, in 1946, his term was extended until 1950. The capital value of the county in 1946 was £586,298, compared with £1,045,712 in 1920.

In 1878, there were nine Europeans at Horoera, six at Te Araroa, and three at Matakaoa. The European population of the county in 1926 was 539 and the natives numbered 963. In 1945, the figures were 303 and 1,547 respectively, plus 3% as an allowance for residents away on war service.

== Biographical information ==
NB: This section is derived from text in Mackay, Joseph Angus (1949). Historic Poverty Bay and the East Coast, N.I., N.Z, available here at the New Zealand Electronic Text Centre.

Tūtere Wī Repa (born at Pahaoa, Bay of Plenty) was the third of eleven children born of Rōpiha Wī Repa and his wife, Wahawaha Terehia (or Wahawaha Apanui) . He was educated at Te Kaha Native School and Te Aute College. A scholarship enabled him to enter the Medical School at the University of Otago. With Sir Peter Buck, a fellow-student, he shared pioneer Maori honours in graduating for the medical profession. He represented Te Aute, Otago University and Poverty Bay at rugby union and was prominent in tennis and other sports. Not only was he an excellent debater, but he was also a gifted writer on Maori history, customs and problems. After practising in the Dunedin Hospital and at Gisborne, he moved to Te Araroa, where he ministered to the needs of widely scattered native communities, and where many of his well-earned fees could never be collected. He died on 25 October 1945.

== See also ==
- Counties of New Zealand
