= Puha, New Zealand =

Puha
- Interactive map of Puha
- Coordinates: 38.463°S 177.830°E
- Country: New Zealand
- District: Gisborne District
- Ward: Tairāwhiti General Ward
- Electorates: East Cape; Ikaroa-Rāwhiti (Māori)

Government
  - Territorial authority: Gisborne District Council
  - Mayor of Gisborne: Rehette Stoltz
  - East Cape MP: Dana Kirkpatrick
  - Ikaroa-Rāwhiti MP: Cushla Tangaere-Manuel

Puha or Puhatikotiko is a locality between the Waipaoa River and the Waikohu River in the Gisborne District of New Zealand's North Island. It is located close to the confluence of the two rivers on State Highway 2 close to Te Karaka, inland from the city of Gisborne.

A notable resident was Te Kani Te Ua.
