= Waikohu River =

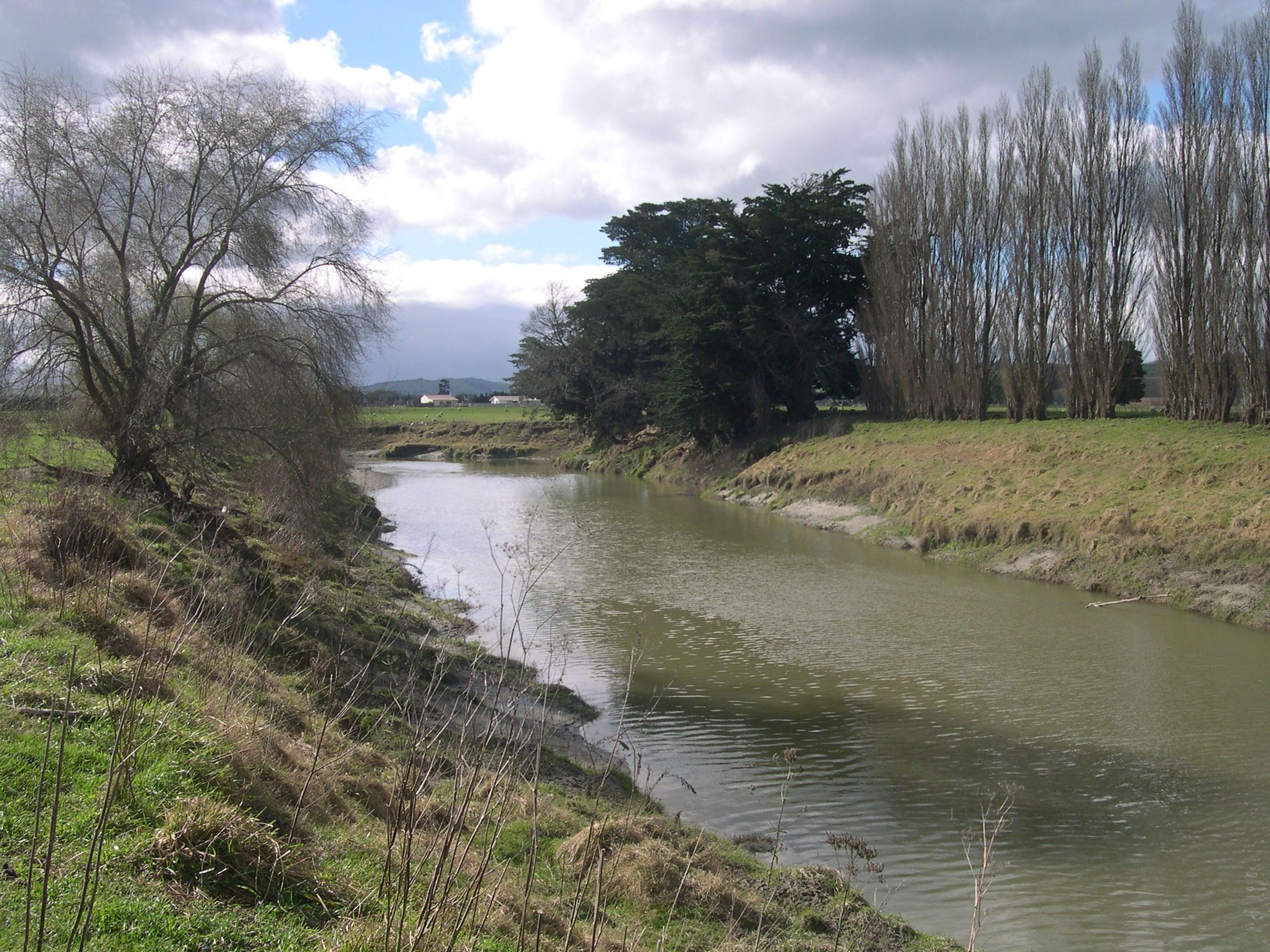
- Kekeparaoa pa site along the Waikohu River
- Route of the Waikohu River
- Mouth of the Waikohu River Waikohu River (North Island)
- Native name: Waikohu (Māori)

Location
- Country: New Zealand
- Island: North Island
- Region: Gisborne

Physical characteristics
- Source
  - coordinates: 38.4674°S 177.5034°E
- Mouth: Waipaoa River
  - coordinates: 38°28′33″S 177°50′30″E

Basin features
- Progression: Waikohu River → Waipaoa River → Poverty Bay → Pacific Ocean
- Tributaries
  - left: Waimare Stream, Kukupara Stream, Rangiriri Stream, Mangatawa Stream,
  - right: Hoe Creek, Waihuka River, Wharekōpae River, Kurunui Stream, Mangamāhaki Stream, Pukematai Stream
- Bridges: Waikohu River No. 1 Bridge, Waikohu River No. 2 Bridge, Waikohu River No. 3 Bridge, Puha Bridge

The Waikohu River is located in the northeast of New Zealand's North Island. A tributary of the Waipaoa River, it rises close to Matawai in the Raukumara Range and flows southeast, reaching the Waipaoa River close to the tiny settlement of Puha, between the settlements of Waikohu and Te Karaka.

== See also ==
- List of rivers of New Zealand
