= Otoko, New Zealand =

Settlement in Gisborne District, New Zealand

Otoko
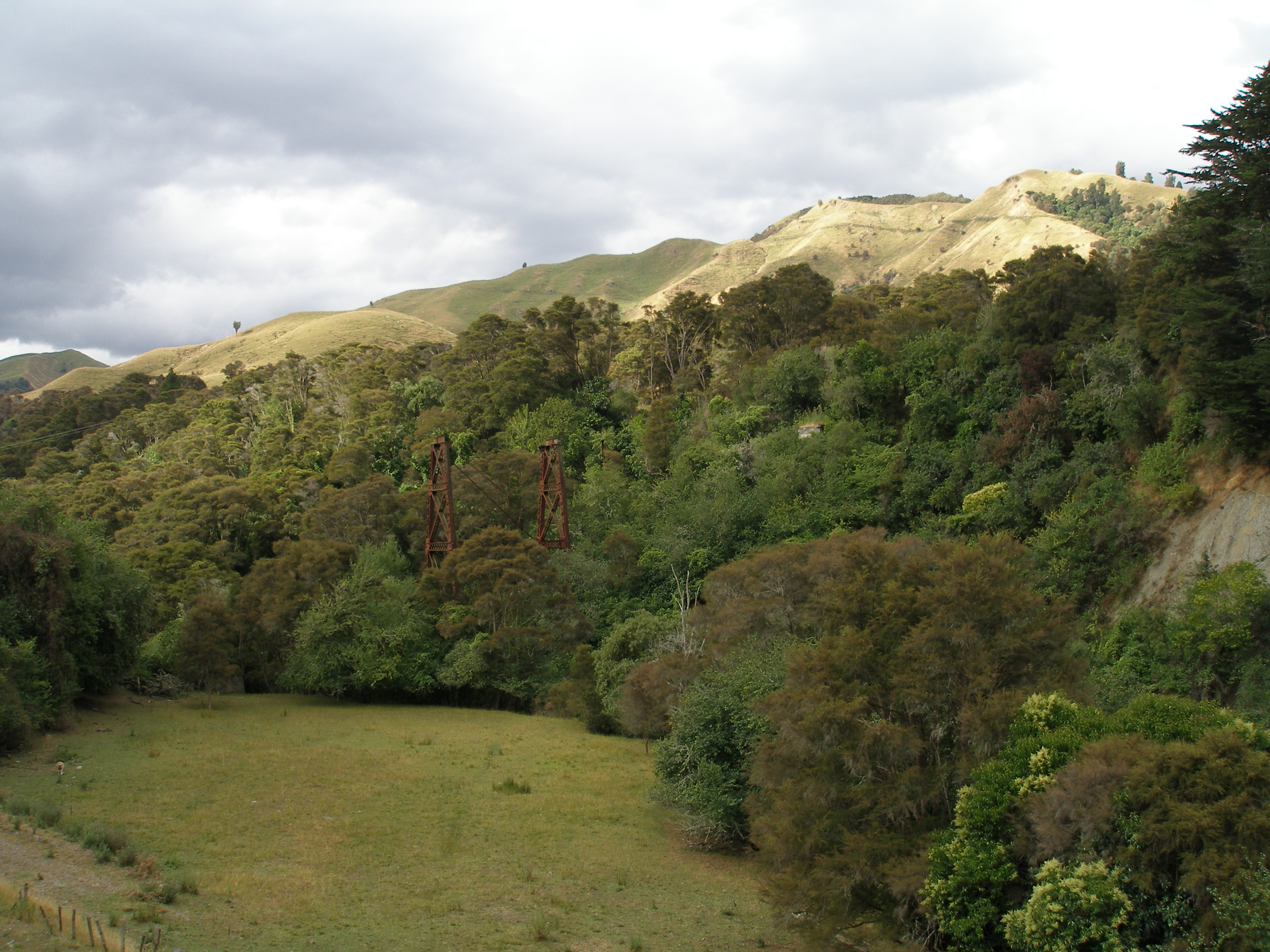
- Pylons from the former Otoko viaduct
- Interactive map of Otoko
- Coordinates: 38.4625°S 177.6482°E
- Country: New Zealand
- Region: Gisborne District
- Ward: Tairāwhiti General Ward
- Electorates: East Cape; Ikaroa-Rāwhiti (Māori)

Government
  - Territorial authority: Gisborne District Council
  - Mayor of Gisborne: Rehette Stoltz
  - East Cape MP: Dana Kirkpatrick
  - Ikaroa-Rāwhiti MP: Cushla Tangaere-Manuel
- Time zone: UTC+12 (NZST)
  - Summer (DST): UTC+13 (NZDT)
- Postcode: 4092
- Area code: 06

Otoko is a small settlement west of Te Karaka in the Gisborne District of New Zealand's North Island. State Highway 2 runs through Otoko on its way from Ōpōtiki to Gisborne. In 2023 Otoko (meshblock 1352401) had a population of 57.

== History ==
Artist Peter Williams farmed in the area in the 1960s.

The community was affected by flooding and frosts in August 2016. It also briefly relied on a generator for power after a plane crash in December 2016.

A man's body was found in Otoko in July 2019.

Local roads were upgraded in 2020 with funding from the Provincial Growth Fund.

=== Railway ===
Otoko railway station
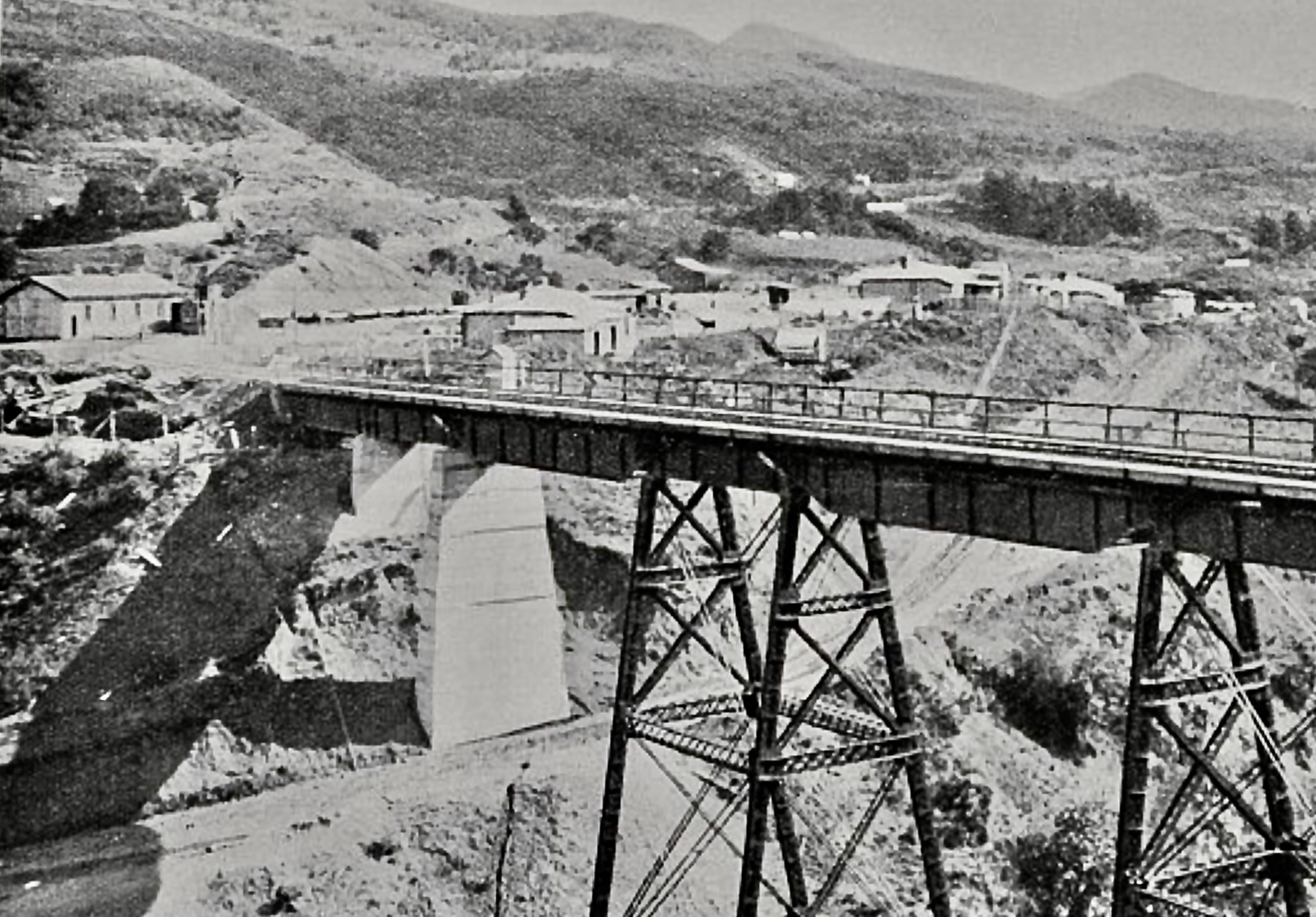
- Otoko station and viaduct

General information
- Elevation: 195 m (640 ft)
- Owner: NZR
- Distance: Gisborne 49.87 km (30.99 mi)

History
- Opened: 1 April 1912
- Closed: 15 March 1959

Services
Preceding station	Historical railways	Following station
Mahaki; Line closed, station closed 9.23 km (5.74 mi) towards Gisborne	Moutohora Branch; NZR	Rākauroa; Line closed, station closed 10.9 km (6.8 mi) towards Mātāwai
Location

The Moutohora Branch had a temporary station from 1 August 1910, when the section from Waikohu opened, though passengers and goods had been carried from 17 June 1910. PWD handed over the section to NZR on 29 January 1912 and it was opened on 1 April 1912 and officially opened by the Minister of Public Works, William MacDonald, on 6 April 1912, when it was described as an important link in the Gisborne-Auckland railway. Initially there were two trains a day, taking 2½ hours from Gisborne and 2hrs 20mins to return. Otoko remained the terminus until 1 November 1914 when the Otoko–Mātāwai section opened. By 1926 Otoko had a station building, platform, cart approach, 30 feet (9.1 m) x 20 ft (6.1 m) goods shed, loading bank, cattle and sheep yards, water, urinals and a passing loop for 50 wagons. In 1912 a house was provided for locomotive men, in 1913 another cottage and more in 1942 and 1946.

The Moutohora Branch closed on 15 March 1959 and within a year part of the station yard had been used to straighten SH2.

==== Otoko viaduct ====
On 21 February 1910 an £11,773 contract was signed with Griffiths & Co, Westport to build Otoko viaduct. A blacksmith's shop was built near the viaduct, with drilling, punching, and planing' machines to prepare the plates for positioning. It was 112 m (367 ft) long and 30 m (98 ft) above the Waihuka River. It was mostly demolished in 1960, but some of the steelwork remains.

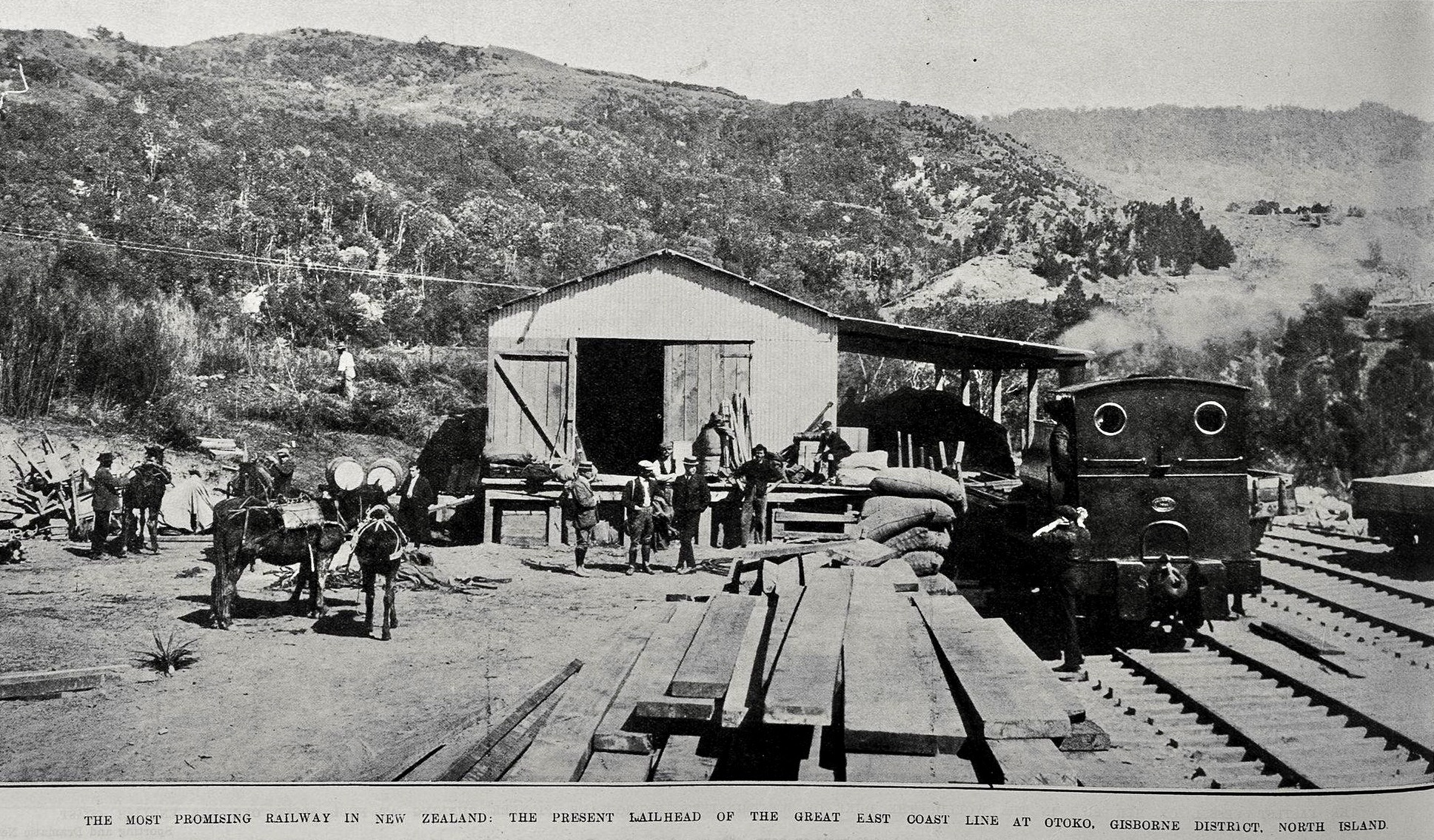
1910 Otoko temporary station
and F Class loco

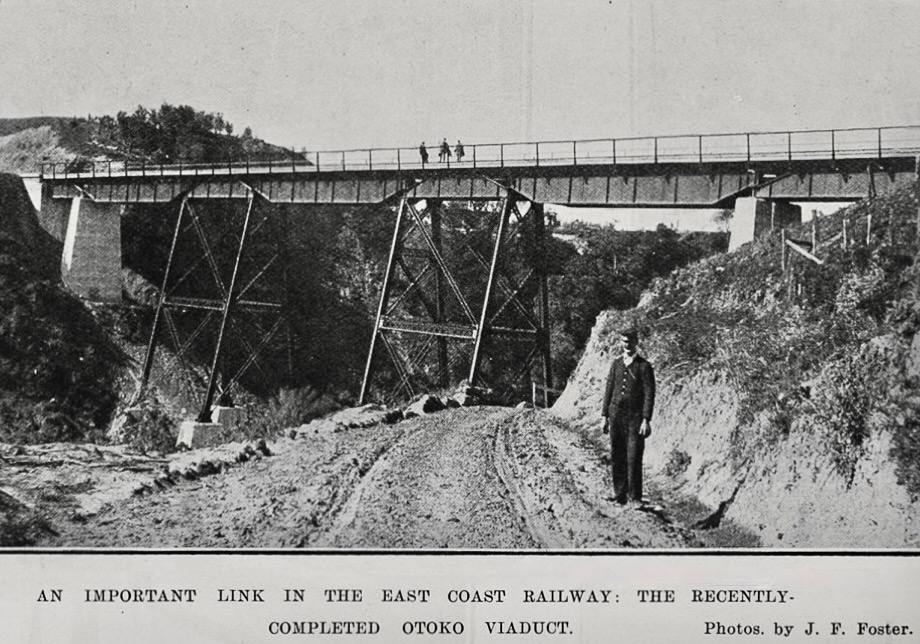
1912 Otoko Viaduct
and Matawai Road

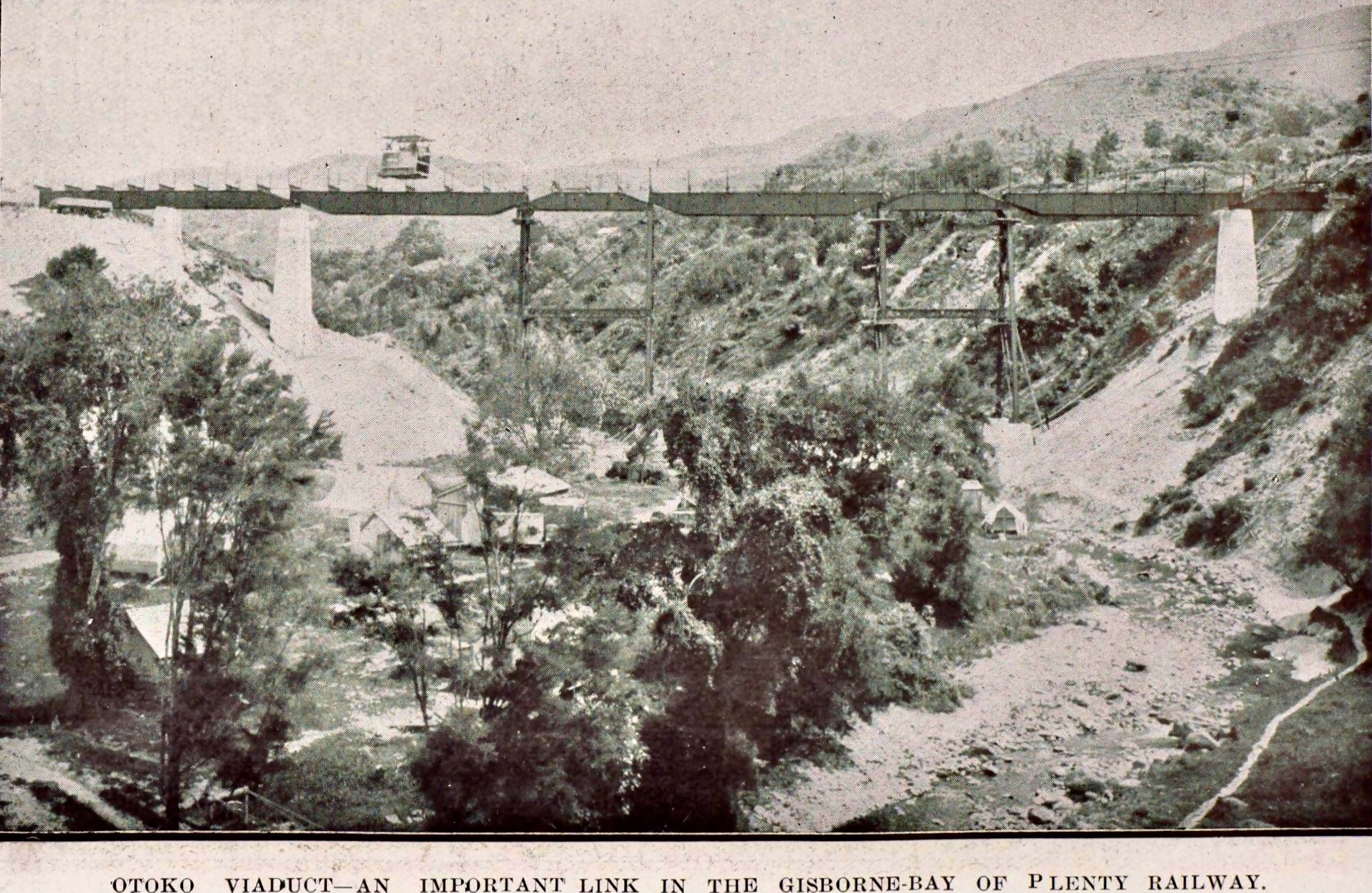
1912 Otoko viaduct

== Parks ==
Otoko Walkway was a conservation reserve and walkway, owned and operated by the Department of Conservation. It largely followed the old railway, but closed in 2024, due to lack of maintenance.
