= Wharekōpae River =

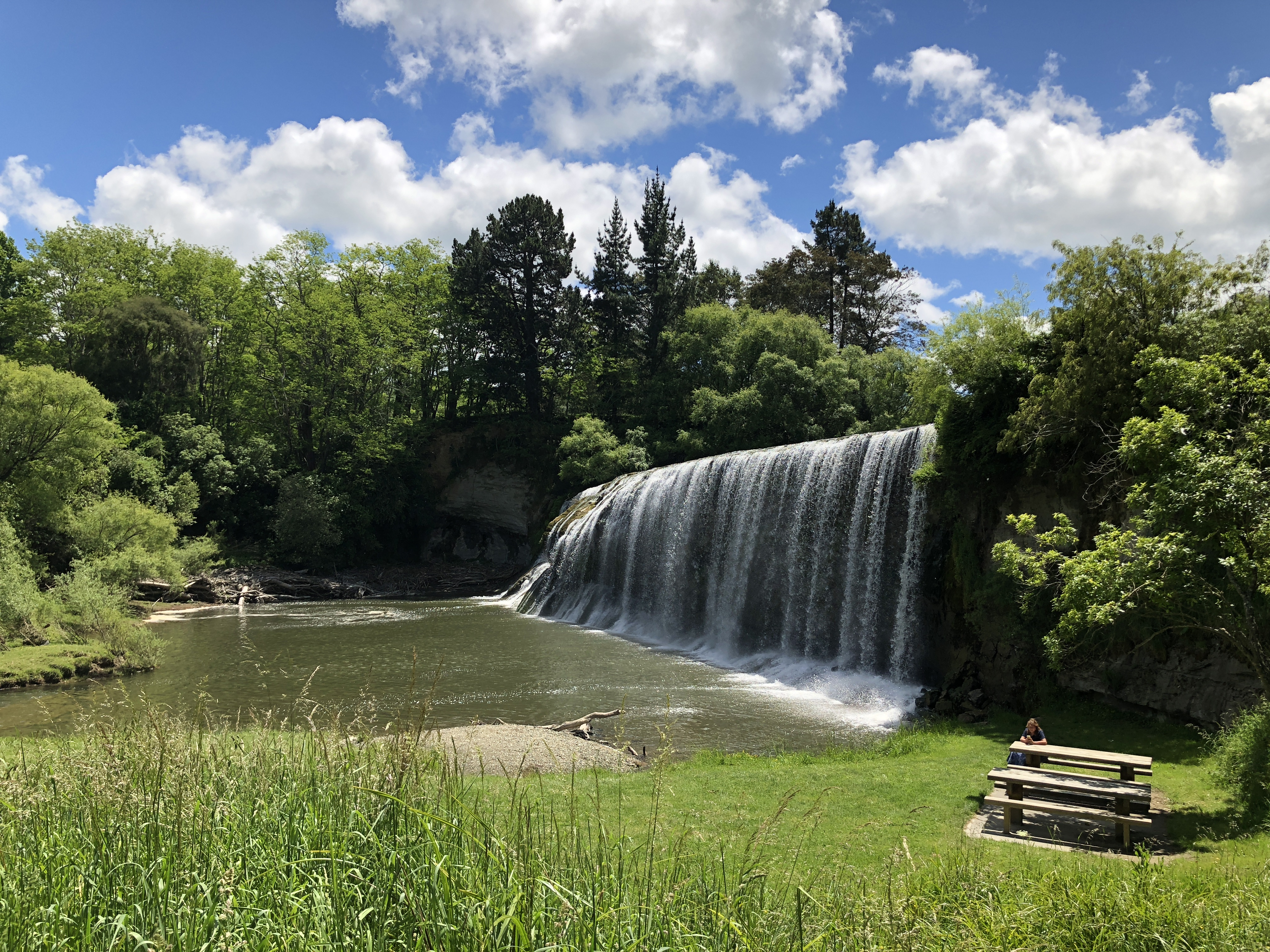
- Rere Falls
- Route of the Wharekōpae River
- Mouth of the Wharekōpae River Wharekōpae River (North Island)
- Native name: Wharekōpae (Māori)

Location
- Country: New Zealand
- Island: North Island
- Region: Gisborne

Physical characteristics
- Source
  - coordinates: 38.53622°S 177.48362°E
- Mouth: Waikohu River
  - coordinates: 38°27′22″S 177°46′15″E

Basin features
- Progression: Wharekōpae River → Waikohu River → Waipaoa River → Poverty Bay → Pacific Ocean
- Tributaries
  - left: Makaretū Stream
  - right: Āmia Stream, Totangi Stream
- Waterfalls: Rere Rock Slide Waterfall, Rere Falls
- Bridges: McCreadies Bridge, Davies (Wharekopae) Bridge, Semmens Bridge

The Wharekōpae River is located in the northeast of New Zealand's North Island. A tributary of the Waikohu River (which is itself a tributary of the Waipaoa River), it rises on the slopes of Maungatapere, a 1,050-metre (3,440 ft) peak at the northeastern end of the Huiarau Range, and flows east, reaching the Waikohu River at the settlement of Waikohu, west of Te Karaka.

At Rere, it cascades over the Rere Rock Slide, a smooth, natural rock formation 60 metres (200 ft) long, and the picturesque Rere Falls.

The river's name is Māori for "house with a side door", which would have been an unusual feature of a traditional Māori dwelling.

== See also ==
- List of rivers of New Zealand
