= Sean Wainui =

New Zealand rugby union player (1995–2021)

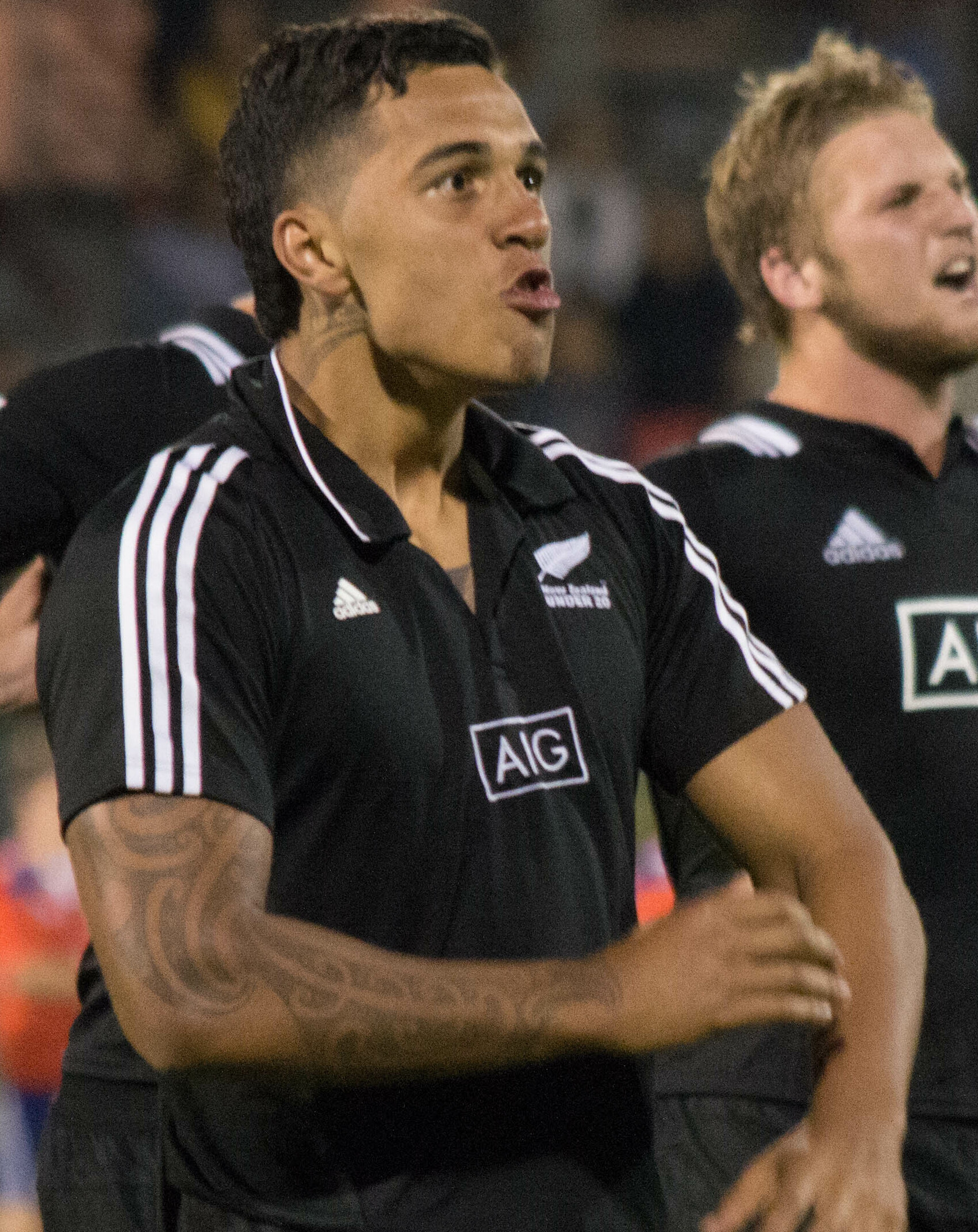
- Wainui in 2015
- Born: 23 October 1995 Whatatutu, Gisborne, New Zealand
- Died: 18 October 2021 (aged 25) McLaren Falls, Bay of Plenty, New Zealand
- Height: 191 cm (6 ft 3 in)
- Weight: 102 kg (225 lb; 16 st 1 lb)
- School: Mount Albert Grammar School; Takapuna Grammar School; St Peter's College

Rugby union career
- Position(s): Wing, Centre
Senior career
Years	Team	Apps	(Points)
2014–2020	Taranaki	53	(75)
2016–2017	Crusaders	9	(0)
2018–2021	Chiefs	44	(90)
2021	Bay of Plenty	3	(15)
- Correct as of 18 October 2021
International career
Years	Team	Apps	(Points)
2015	New Zealand U20	4	(15)
2015–2021	Māori All Blacks	10	(40)
- Correct as of 18 October 2021

Sean Wainui (23 October 1995 – 18 October 2021) was a New Zealand rugby union player. He played on the wing (and occasionally centre) for provincial side Bay of Plenty, the Chiefs in Super Rugby, and for New Zealand's Māori international side the Māori All Blacks.

== Early life ==
Wainui was born in Whatatutu near Gisborne, in the North Island in New Zealand. He was a member of the Takapuna Grammar School 1st XV in 2011, 2012 and 2013. He was awarded North Harbour's 2013 Māori Colts Senior Player of the Year whilst still in school. Also an ex Takapuna Grammar Prefect and 1st XV Captain, Wainui represented New Zealand on the world stage after playing for the Champion New Zealand team in the Under 20 Rugby World Cup in Italy. The team played England for the title, winning 21–16.

== Domestic career ==
=== Taranaki ===
Upon leaving school, Wainui was contracted by the Taranaki Rugby Football Union. In his first year out of school he was a part of Taranaki's 2014 national provincial championship squad. He was spotted by coach Colin Cooper and had signed with Taranaki at just 18-years-old after an impressive season, not only for his New Plymouth Old Boys club but for the Chiefs development side also. Wainui made his debut for Taranaki in the 2014 ITM Cup competition, coming on as a replacement against Waikato. In the following year, he recorded nine appearances, including 5 starts, and scored three tries for the province in Super Rugby matches. Overall, between 2014 and 2020, Wainui made 49 appearances for Taranaki and scored 15 tries.

=== Crusaders ===
In 2015 he was signed by the Super Rugby franchise the Crusaders after impressing in the centre and wing position for Taranaki. Wainui made his debut for the Crusaders in round one of the 2016 Super Rugby competition, starting in the outside centre position against the Chiefs.

=== Chiefs ===
Prior to the 2018 Super Rugby season, he signed with the Chiefs. By the end of the 2021 Super Rugby season, he made 44 appearances for the club and has scored 18 tries. On 12 June 2021, in a 40–7 victory over the Waratahs during Super Rugby Trans-Tasman, he became the first player in Super Rugby history to score 5 tries in a single match.

=== Bay of Plenty ===
On 27 May 2021, Wainui announced on Instagram that he had signed with Bay of Plenty for the 2021 NPC.

== International career ==
At the age of 19, Wainui was called up to the New Zealand U-20 team in 2015.

Although the then 19-year-old Wainui had only played several matches for Taranaki, Colin Cooper, the Māori All Blacks coach, selected him for the 2015 tour to Fiji, playing against the national side, and ending against the specially made New Zealand Barbarians. Overall he was capped 10 times.

== Personal life ==
Like many other fellow Māori All Blacks players, Wainui was a New Zealander of Māori descent (in his case, he was of Ngāi Tūhoe and Ngāti Porou descent).

== Death ==
Wainui died at about 7:50 am on 18 October 2021, five days before his 26th birthday, when the car that he was driving crashed into a tree at McLaren Falls Park near Tauranga. The coroner confirmed that Wainui’s case is being treated as a suspected suicide. Wainui's tangihanga was held at Te Wainui marae in Whatatutu on 24 October 2021.

Before the test match between the New Zealand All Blacks and the United States at FedExField in Washington D.C. on 24 October 2021, a moment of silence was held in memory of Wainui's death. The United States team's captain, Bryce Campbell, presented the All Blacks a white No. 11 shirt with Wainui's name.

A similar tribute was paid in 2022, when the Māori All Blacks performed their Haka Te Tīmatanga, just before their June 29 clash with Ireland. During the tribute, a green Irish jersey printed with the number eleven was presented to Wainui's widow and children.
