= Waihuka River =

- Route of the Waihuka River
- Mouth of the Waihuka River Waihuka River (North Island)
- Native name: Waihuka (Māori)

Location
- Country: New Zealand
- Island: North Island
- Region: Gisborne

Physical characteristics
- Source
  - coordinates: 38.45655°S 177.54936°E
- Mouth: Waikohu River
  - coordinates: 38°27′07″S 177°46′00″E

Basin features
- Progression: Waihuka River → Waikohu River → Waipaoa River → Poverty Bay → Pacific Ocean
- Tributaries
  - right: Waiāraikau Stream, Parihohonu Stream, Coal Stream / Gold Creek, Hihiroroa Stream
- Bridges: ANZAC Bridge, Waihuka River No. 1 Bridge, Waihuka River No. 2 Bridge, Waihuka River No. 3 Bridge, Waihuka River No. 4 Bridge

The Waihuka River is a river of the Gisborne Region of New Zealand's North Island. It flows generally east to reach the Waikohu River 10 kilometres (6 mi) west of Te Karaka. State Highway 2 follows the course of the Waihuka for part of its route between Te Karaka and Matawai.

== See also ==
- List of rivers of New Zealand
