= Tūtere Wī Repa =

New Zealand Māori doctor (1877–1945)

- Born: 1877; Pāhaoa, near Te Kaha, Bay of Plenty, New Zealand
- Died: 25 October 1945 (aged 67–68); Hicks Bay, New Zealand
- Education: Te Aute College, University of Otago (MB ChB, 1908)
- Occupation: Medical practitioner
- Known for: One of the first Māori to qualify as a medical doctor
- Spouses: Merewhati Pitt (died 1926); Mīria Rūhā (née Tīhore)

Tūtere Wī Repa (1877 – 25 October 1945) was a New Zealand medical practitioner, community leader and writer on Māori history. Of Te Whānau-ā-Apanui, Ngāti Porou and Ngāti Kahungunu descent, he entered the University of Otago's medical school in 1899 alongside Te Rangi Hīroa (Peter Buck) and graduated in 1908, being one of the first Māori to qualify as a doctor. He was active in the Te Aute College Students' Association, from which the Young Māori Party developed, and spent most of his career as a general practitioner in the remote East Cape communities of Te Araroa and Hicks Bay. He played representative rugby union for Otago and Poverty Bay.

== Early life and education ==
Wī Repa was born in 1877 at Pāhaoa, near Te Kaha in the Bay of Plenty, the third of eleven children of Rōpiha (also known as Eruera) Wī Repa and his wife Wahawaha Terehia (also recorded as Wahawaha Apanui). (Note: The 1966 Encyclopaedia of New Zealand gives his birthplace as Hicks Bay; the Dictionary of New Zealand Biography, the Gisborne Herald obituary and J. A. Mackay's regional history all give Pāhaoa.) Through his parents he was affiliated to the iwi Te Whānau-ā-Apanui, Ngāti Porou and Ngāti Kahungunu. One of his paternal great-grandfathers, Edward William Raper, was a Pākehā whaler who had lived at Te Kaha.

He started at Te Kaha Native School in 1884, and a government scholarship allowed him to go on to Te Aute College in Hawke's Bay, which he entered in August 1888. At Te Aute he became a prefect, was the first president of the school's Christian Union, captained the senior rugby team in 1896, played tennis, and was one of the first officers of the college cadet corps. After matriculating he stayed on at the college for about two years as a member of the teaching staff.

=== Te Aute College Students' Association ===
In 1891, while still a prefect, Wī Repa became involved in the short-lived Association for the Amelioration of the Condition of the Māori Race. He was teaching at the college when the longer-lasting Te Aute College Students' Association was founded in 1897, and at the inaugural conference he read a paper entitled "Te Aute boys after leaving school". In the closing address to that conference Āpirana Ngata urged young Māori to train as doctors so that they could help improve Māori health, a call that both Wī Repa and Peter Buck took up. The two passed the medical preliminary examination at Gisborne in 1898, which qualified them for a government scholarship of £60 a year.

The association became the southern division of the Young Māori Party in 1909, and Wī Repa served for a time on its executive. Newspaper obituaries in 1945 and the 1966 Encyclopaedia of New Zealand described him as one of the founders of the Young Māori Party, alongside Ngata, Buck and Māui Pōmare.

== Medical training ==
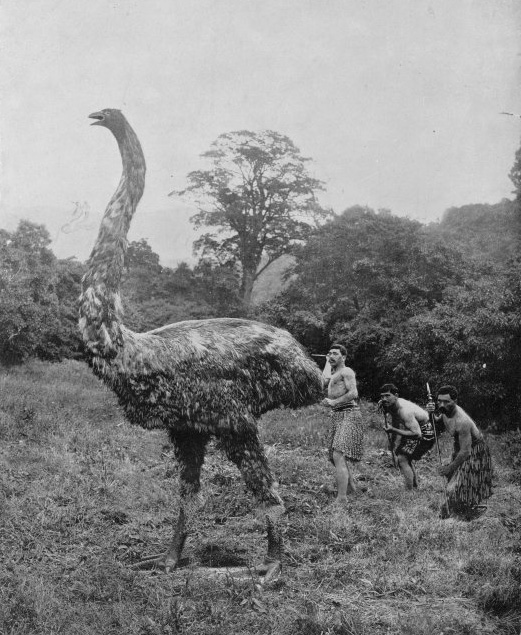
Peter Buck, Koroneho Hēmi Papakura and Wī Repa posing as moa hunters with Augustus Hamilton's reconstructed moa in Dunedin, c. 1903

In 1899 Wī Repa and Buck travelled to Dunedin to begin medical studies at the University of Otago; they were the first Māori to train there as doctors. Wī Repa took a full part in student life. He served on the executive of the students' association, belonged to the rugby, cricket and tennis clubs, captained the university rugby team, and played for the Otago provincial side in 1899 and 1903.

While they were students, Wī Repa, Buck and Koroneho Hēmi Papakura dressed as warriors and posed with spears beside a feathered moa reconstruction assembled by Augustus Hamilton, in a staged "moa hunt" photograph. According to Te Papa curator Athol McCredie, accounts differ on whether Hamilton arranged the scene himself or whether it began as a student prank, but the image has since been widely reproduced in publications and exhibitions.

Wī Repa passed his final examinations in 1906 and graduated MB ChB in 1908. (Note: The 1966 Encyclopaedia of New Zealand and obituaries published in 1945 give the year of his degree as 1906. The Dictionary of New Zealand Biography, Te Ara's history of health practitioners and the Māori Medical Practitioners Association all give 1908.) He was the third Māori to qualify as a doctor, after Pōmare, who graduated in Chicago in 1899, and Buck, who graduated from Otago in 1904. In 1907 he worked as a junior house surgeon at Dunedin Hospital.

== Medical career ==
=== Te Karaka and Gisborne ===
Wī Repa returned north and went into private practice at Te Karaka, north-west of Gisborne. The 1966 Encyclopaedia of New Zealand records that he applied unsuccessfully for the position of house surgeon at Gisborne. In 1912 one of his brothers was convicted over the death of another brother in a fight, and the Dictionary of New Zealand Biography states that the resulting publicity contributed to his decision to leave the Gisborne district.

=== Te Araroa and Hicks Bay ===
He set up practice at Te Araroa, near East Cape, and became resident medical officer of the newly opened cottage hospital there. According to his Dictionary of New Zealand Biography entry, some residents were at first reluctant to accept a Māori doctor, and he had difficulty persuading sceptics that better sanitation was needed to prevent outbreaks of tuberculosis and typhoid fever, although his views eventually prevailed. His patients were scattered over a wide area, and reaching them often meant long rides on horseback over muddy tracks at any hour; district nurses assisted him, particularly at births. He also lectured in schools on Māori history and health, and compiled a study of tuberculosis trends in the district.

Many of his patients could not afford to pay, and much of what he was owed was never collected. The Gisborne Herald wrote after his death that he had never made the ability to pay a condition of his services, and that his choice of profession and district had left him in "comparative penury" for most of his life. The introduction of state-funded payments to doctors under the Social Security Act 1938 gave him financial security for the first time.

After the death of his first wife in 1926 he moved to ancestral land at Hicks Bay, where he continued to practise, riding to Te Araroa when he was needed. His health declined during the Second World War, and despite treatment at several hospitals he gradually had to give up medical work.

== Public life ==
Wī Repa was a member of the Matakaoa County Council, the Hicks Bay Harbour Board and the Te Araroa Native School Committee, among other local bodies. He appears with fellow councillor Rēweti Kōhere in a photograph of the first Matakaoa County Council (1920–29) reproduced in Kōhere's autobiography. His public commitments lessened when the Hicks Bay Harbour Board was wound up; he later left the county council and gradually withdrew from local administration.

Fluent in both Māori and English, he was in demand as a speaker on marae and at public events. The Gisborne Herald called him "an orator of the first water" and recalled that he insisted on exact usage in both languages and disliked the mixing of English words into spoken Māori. In 1913 he was a member of Te Whakakotahitanga, a group that sought to revive the Kotahitanga movement. He sometimes acted as an adviser to the Native Land Court, and he supported schemes to consolidate Māori land titles, exchanging shares for that purpose but never selling them. When the Te Araroa Native District High School was established he supplied its motto, He tohe ka tutuki ("success through tenacity").

During the Second World War he was the main speaker at most local farewells for departing soldiers, and he often accompanied the postmaster in delivering casualty telegrams to families in the district. The Evening Post reported that he took a prominent part in organising the Māori war effort on the East Coast until his health failed.

== Writing and scholarship ==
Wī Repa wrote in both English and Māori and contributed regularly to Māori-language periodicals on a wide range of subjects; he also prepared papers for medical and scientific conferences. He was a significant contributor to Ngā Mōteatea, Ngata's collection of traditional waiata. In 1918–19 he published, in Māori, a history of Te Whetūmatarau pā at Te Araroa, which appeared in instalments in the Māori-language periodical Te Kopara.

He was regarded as an authority on Māori tribal history, particularly that of Poverty Bay. J. A. Mackay's 1949 regional history described him as "a gifted writer on Maori history, customs and problems".

== Rugby ==
Wī Repa played at fullback. After captaining the Te Aute College senior team in 1896, he captained the Otago University side and represented Otago in 1899 and 1903. John O'Shea, a former Wellington city solicitor, recalled in 1945 that in one club match against Kaikorai, Wī Repa tackled the same opponent eight times in the second half of a game the university won 8–5.

In 1908 he played fullback for Poverty Bay against the touring Anglo-Welsh team at Gisborne. Poverty Bay lost 26–0, but according to the Gisborne Herald his defence against the visiting forwards was such that the game was remembered locally for years as "Wi Repa's match".

== Personal life and death ==
Wī Repa married Merewhati Pitt at Gisborne. They had no children of their own, but some time after 1916 they adopted Reginald Tūtūtaonga Jackson, known as Tūtū, the son of a neighbouring family at Te Araroa. Merewhati died in 1926. Shortly before the Second World War he married Mīria Rūhā (née Tīhore) of Hicks Bay; their son Sidney died young, and their daughter, Terehia Tangiwai, was born in 1943.

His adopted son, who reached the rank of major, and Tūtū's brothers Everard and Sydney Jackson all served in the war. One of Wī Repa's sisters, Mrs Harry Parkes, was reported to be among the first Māori women to qualify as a nurse.

Wī Repa died at Hicks Bay on 25 October 1945 after several years of illness, survived by his wife and two children.

== Legacy ==
The Dictionary of New Zealand Biography describes Wī Repa as one of a group of early-twentieth-century Māori who put their professional training at the service of their people, but as less well known than Ngata, Buck and Pōmare because he spent his career in a remote district. His obituary in the Gisborne Herald was headed "Medical pioneer", and quoted a prominent East Coast Māori as saying that he had entered a profession "long before the general run of his people realised the need for such pioneering".

Te Ohu Rata o Aotearoa (Te ORA), the Māori Medical Practitioners Association, names Wī Repa with Pōmare, Buck and Ned Ellison as the "famous quartet" with whom the history of Māori doctors begins.

Portraits of Wī Repa are held by the Alexander Turnbull Library, which has a studio portrait taken by Stanley Polkinghorne Andrew in December 1928, and by the Hocken Collections at the University of Otago.
