= Whatatutu =

Small settlement in the northeast of New Zealand's North Island

- Town
- Interactive map of Whatatutu
- Coordinates: 38°23′S 177°50′E
- Country: New Zealand
- Region: Gisborne District
- Ward: Tairāwhiti General Ward
- Electorates: East Cape; Ikaroa-Rāwhiti (Māori)

Government
  - Territorial authority: Gisborne District Council
  - Mayor of Gisborne: Rehette Stoltz
  - East Cape MP: Dana Kirkpatrick
  - Ikaroa-Rāwhiti MP: Cushla Tangaere-Manuel

Area
  - Total: 0.52 km^{2} (0.20 sq mi)

Population (2023 Census)
  - Total: 159
  - Density: 310/km^{2} (790/sq mi)
- Time zone: UTC+12 (NZST)
  - Summer (DST): UTC+13 (NZDT)
- Area code: 06

Whatatutu is a small settlement in the northeast of New Zealand's North Island. It is located north of Te Karaka on the upper reaches of the Waipaoa River, close to its meeting with its tributaries, the Mangatū River and Waingaromia River.

Whatatutu is about 45 minutes from Gisborne. Oil-bearing rock has been known to exist in small quantities for many years, but not in commercial quantities. The search for more economically viable sources continues in the area.

== Demographics ==
Whatatutu covers 0.52 km^{2} (0.20 sq mi). It is part of the Waipaoa statistical area.

Historical population
Year	Pop.	±% p.a.
2006	150	—
2013	135	−1.49%
2018	147	+1.72%
2023	159	+1.58%

Whatatutu had a population of 159 in the 2023 New Zealand census, an increase of 12 people (8.2%) since the 2018 census, and an increase of 24 people (17.8%) since the 2013 census. There were 66 males and 93 females in 54 dwellings. 1.9% of people identified as LGBTIQ+. The median age was 35.7 years (compared with 38.1 years nationally). There were 48 people (30.2%) aged under 15 years, 21 (13.2%) aged 15 to 29, 69 (43.4%) aged 30 to 64, and 24 (15.1%) aged 65 or older.

People could identify as more than one ethnicity. The results were 47.2% European (Pākehā), 67.9% Māori, and 7.5% Pasifika. English was spoken by 94.3%, Māori by 34.0%, and other languages by 1.9%. No language could be spoken by 1.9% (e.g. too young to talk). The percentage of people born overseas was 7.5, compared with 28.8% nationally.

Religious affiliations were 32.1% Christian, and 3.8% Māori religious beliefs. People who answered that they had no religion were 52.8%, and 11.3% of people did not answer the census question.

Of those at least 15 years old, 27 (24.3%) people had a bachelor's or higher degree, 63 (56.8%) had a post-high school certificate or diploma, and 24 (21.6%) people exclusively held high school qualifications. The median income was $41,000, compared with $41,500 nationally. 12 people (10.8%) earned over $100,000 compared to 12.1% nationally. The employment status of those at least 15 was 51 (45.9%) full-time, 24 (21.6%) part-time, and 6 (5.4%) unemployed.

== Marae ==
Whatatutu has three marae related to the hapū of Te Aitanga ā Māhaki, originally belonging to the iwi of Ngariki Kaiputahi.

Māngatu Marae and Te Ngāwari meeting house is a meeting place of Ngariki Kaiputahi. In October 2020, the Government committed $185,301 from the Provincial Growth Fund to upgrade the marae's effluent system, creating 3 jobs.

Te Wainui and Te Whare o Hera meeting house is also affiliated with the Ngariki Kaiputahi iwi. In October 2020, the Government committed $812,548 to upgrade Mahaki marae and Mātāwai Marae, creating 15.4 jobs.

Taihamiti Marae is a meeting place of Ngāi Tamatea.

== Climate ==
Climate data for Mangatu Forest (1971–2000 normals, extremes 1963–1987)
Month	Jan	Feb	Mar	Apr	May	Jun	Jul	Aug	Sep	Oct	Nov	Dec	Year
Record high °C (°F)	34.5 (94.1)	33.8 (92.8)	32.2 (90.0)	26.8 (80.2)	22.5 (72.5)	20.6 (69.1)	20.5 (68.9)	21.1 (70.0)	23.0 (73.4)	27.5 (81.5)	32.5 (90.5)	31.7 (89.1)	34.5 (94.1)
Mean maximum °C (°F)	30.8 (87.4)	30.3 (86.5)	27.2 (81.0)	23.8 (74.8)	20.7 (69.3)	18.9 (66.0)	17.2 (63.0)	18.6 (65.5)	20.8 (69.4)	23.5 (74.3)	27.4 (81.3)	28.5 (83.3)	31.5 (88.7)
Mean daily maximum °C (°F)	24.3 (75.7)	24.0 (75.2)	21.8 (71.2)	19.0 (66.2)	16.1 (61.0)	13.7 (56.7)	12.8 (55.0)	13.8 (56.8)	15.9 (60.6)	18.2 (64.8)	20.3 (68.5)	22.6 (72.7)	18.5 (65.4)
Daily mean °C (°F)	18.6 (65.5)	18.4 (65.1)	16.6 (61.9)	14.1 (57.4)	11.4 (52.5)	9.3 (48.7)	8.5 (47.3)	9.2 (48.6)	11.0 (51.8)	13.0 (55.4)	15.1 (59.2)	17.0 (62.6)	13.5 (56.3)
Mean daily minimum °C (°F)	12.9 (55.2)	12.9 (55.2)	11.3 (52.3)	9.2 (48.6)	6.7 (44.1)	4.9 (40.8)	4.2 (39.6)	4.7 (40.5)	6.1 (43.0)	7.8 (46.0)	9.8 (49.6)	11.4 (52.5)	8.5 (47.3)
Mean minimum °C (°F)	5.9 (42.6)	7.0 (44.6)	4.9 (40.8)	3.1 (37.6)	0.4 (32.7)	−1.4 (29.5)	−1.6 (29.1)	−1.0 (30.2)	−0.2 (31.6)	1.5 (34.7)	3.6 (38.5)	4.9 (40.8)	−2.4 (27.7)
Record low °C (°F)	2.0 (35.6)	2.9 (37.2)	0.6 (33.1)	−2.1 (28.2)	−2.1 (28.2)	−5.3 (22.5)	−5.9 (21.4)	−4.2 (24.4)	−3.2 (26.2)	−1.5 (29.3)	−1.1 (30.0)	1.2 (34.2)	−5.9 (21.4)
Average rainfall mm (inches)	55.7 (2.19)	54.8 (2.16)	120.4 (4.74)	122.3 (4.81)	107.2 (4.22)	131.6 (5.18)	126.5 (4.98)	105.8 (4.17)	121.6 (4.79)	89.7 (3.53)	64.1 (2.52)	63.3 (2.49)	1,163 (45.78)
Source: NIWA (rain 1981–2010)
