= Mangatū River =

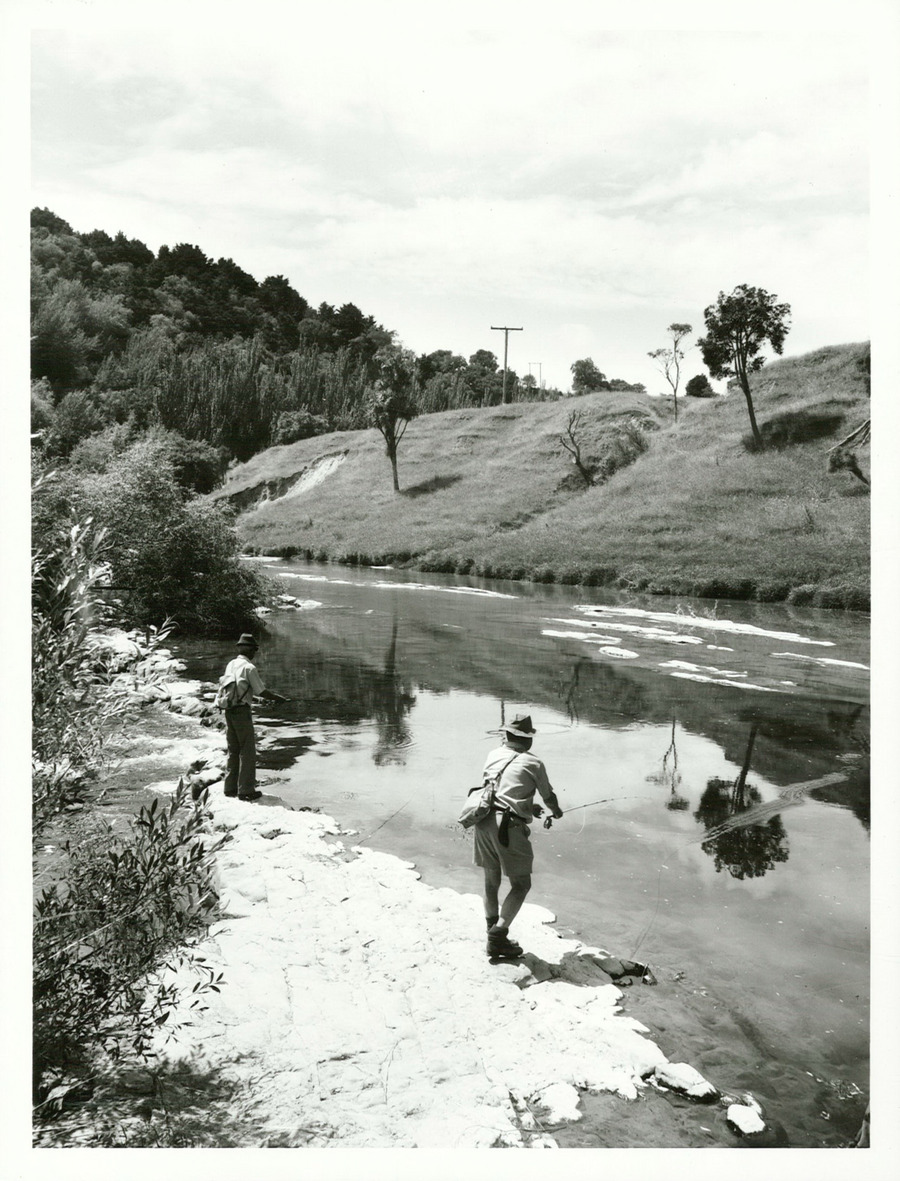
- Trout fishing in the Mangatū River, 1983
- Route of the Mangatū River
- Mouth of the Mangatū River Mangatū River (North Island)
- Native name: Mangatū (Māori)

Location
- Country: New Zealand
- Island: North Island
- Region: Gisborne

Physical characteristics
- Source: Confluence of Mangatahu Stream and Mangatū Stream
  - coordinates: 38.28829°S 177.78350°E
- Mouth: Waipaoa River
  - location: Whatatutu
  - coordinates: 38°22′33″S 177°49′34″E
- Length: 24 km (15 mi)

Basin features
- Progression: Mangatū River → Waipaoa River → Poverty Bay → Pacific Ocean
- Tributaries
  - left: Te Hua Stream, Ōtamahama Stream
  - right: Makuriwao Stream, Ōmarukohaki Stream, Ōpokongaruru Stream, Mangamāia Stream, Mangapapa Stream, Urukokomuka Stream

The Mangatū River is in the Gisborne District of New Zealand's North Island. It flows south from its sources in rough hill country northeast of Mātāwai to reach the Waipaoa River at Whatatutu.

== See also ==
- List of rivers of New Zealand
