= Waingaromia River =

- Route of the Waingaromia River
- Mouth of the Waingaromia River Waingaromia River (North Island)
- Native name: Waingaromia (Māori)

Location
- Country: New Zealand
- Island: North Island
- Region: Gisborne

Physical characteristics
- Source
  - coordinates: 38.24435°S 178.03373°E
- Mouth: Waipaoa River
  - location: Whatatutu
  - coordinates: 38°23′33″S 177°51′32″E
- Length: 25 km (16 mi)

Basin features
- Progression: Waingaromia River → Waipaoa River → Poverty Bay → Pacific Ocean
- Tributaries
  - left: Parariki Stream, Mākahakaha Ngārara Stream, Kawakawa Stream
  - right: Mangatuamaru Stream, Waitangi Stream

The Waingaromia River is a river of the Gisborne District of New Zealand's North Island. It flows generally southwest from its origins 25 kilometres (16 mi) west of Tolaga Bay to reach the Waipaoa River close to Whatatutu.

== See also ==
- List of rivers of New Zealand
