= Te Ārai River =

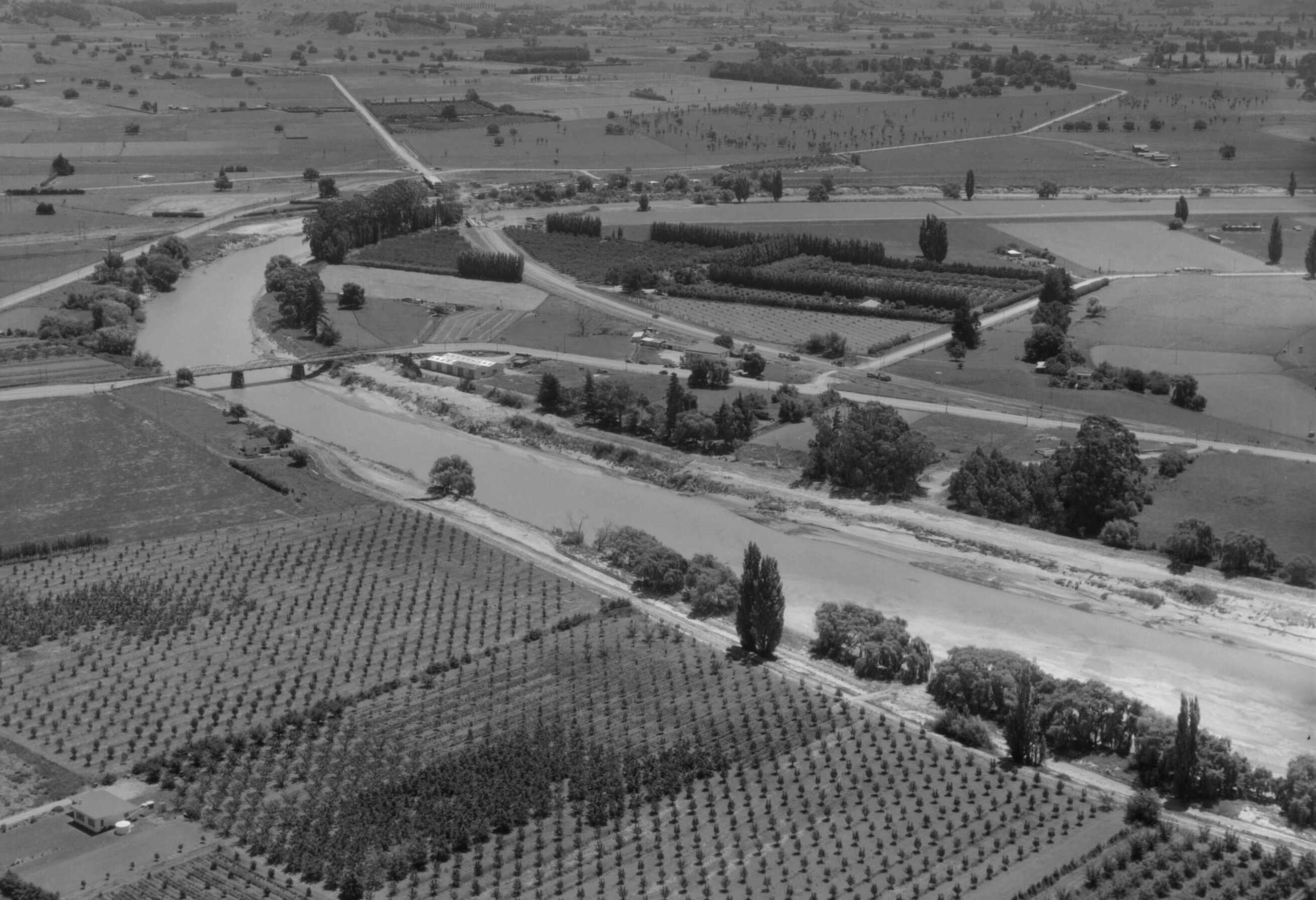
- Te Ārai River in 1955
- Route of the Te Ārai River
- Mouth of the Te Ārai River Te Ārai River (North Island)
- Native name: Te Ārai (Māori)

Location
- Country: New Zealand
- Island: North Island
- Region: Gisborne

Physical characteristics
- Source
  - coordinates: 38.83342°S 177.83544°E
- Mouth: Waipaoa River
  - location: Manutūkē
  - coordinates: 38°40′52″S 177°56′10″E
- Length: 32 km (20 mi)

Basin features
- Progression: Te Ārai River → Waipaoa River → Poverty Bay → Pacific Ocean
- Tributaries
  - left: Titokanui Stream, Kauwaewaka Stream, Waimatā Stream, Whatatuna Stream
  - right: Waingake Stream, Ōngaware Stream, Ranginui Stream
- Bridges: Te Arai River Bridge

The Te Ārai River is a river of the Gisborne Region of New Zealand's North Island. It flows generally north from its origins in rough hill country 20 kilometres (12 mi) north of Nūhaka before veering northeast past the township of Manutūkē to reach the Waipaoa River five kilometres from the latter's outflow into Poverty Bay. Since 16 July 2020 the official name of the river has been Te Ārai River.

== See also ==
- List of rivers of New Zealand
