= Rere, New Zealand =

Rere
- Settlement
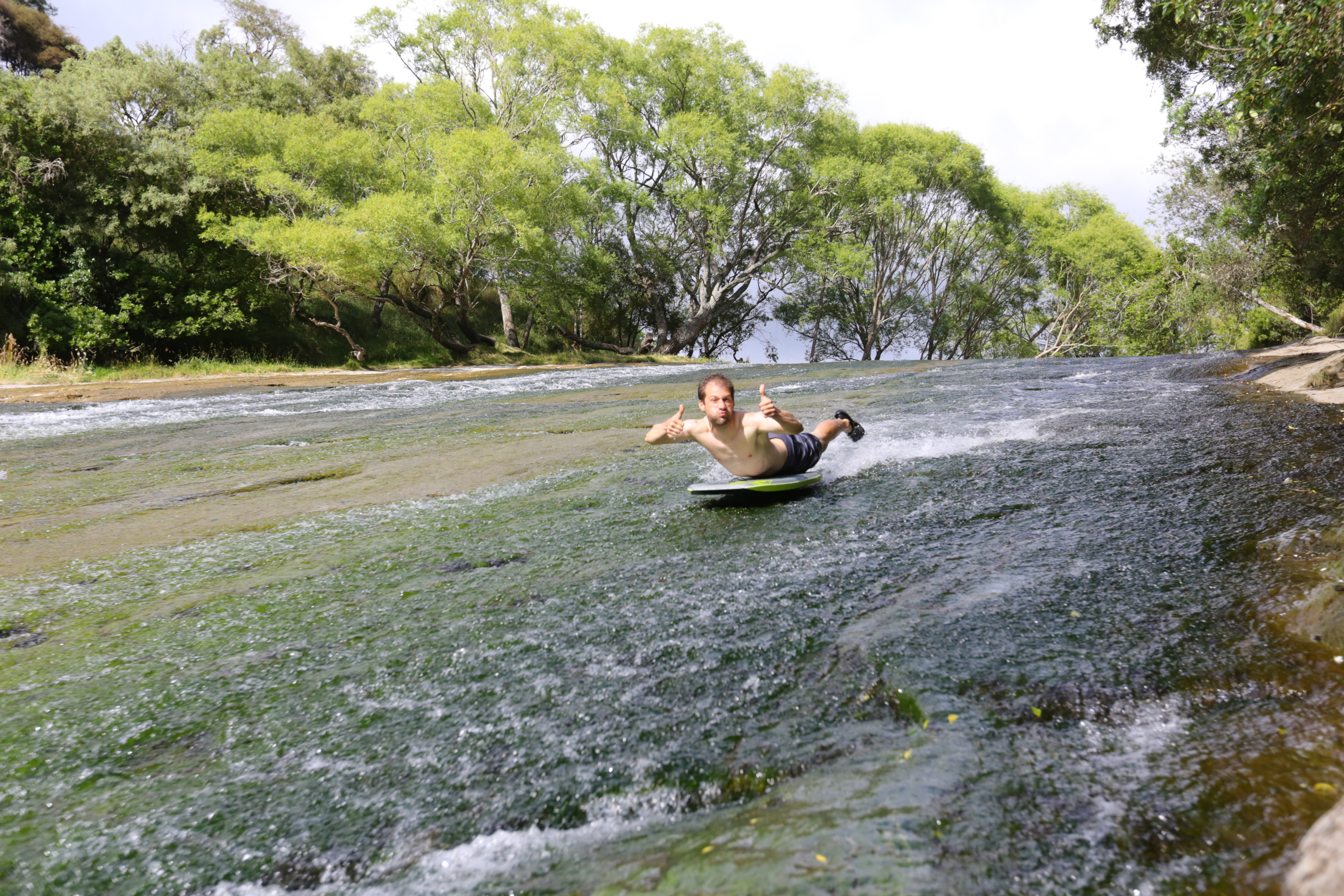
- Sliding down the Rere Rockslide
- Interactive map of Rere
- Coordinates: 38°32′05″S 177°36′13″E
- Country: New Zealand
- Region: Gisborne District
- Ward: Tairāwhiti General Ward
- Electorates: Napier; Ikaroa-Rāwhiti (Māori)

Government
  - Territorial authority: Gisborne District Council
  - Mayor of Gisborne: Rehette Stoltz
  - Napier MP: Katie Nimon
  - Ikaroa-Rāwhiti MP: Cushla Tangaere-Manuel

Area
  - Total: 243.76 km^{2} (94.12 sq mi)

Population (2023 Census)
  - Total: 135
  - Density: 0.554/km^{2} (1.43/sq mi)
- Postcode(s): 4072

Rere is a small community in the northeast of New Zealand's North Island. it is located in the upper valley of the Wharekōpae River in remote country in the foothills of the Huiarau Range, inland from Gisborne. It is notable for the Rere Falls and Rere Rock Slide, both on the Wharekopae River.

Rere Falls, while not very tall at 5 metres (16 ft), is a picturesque 20 metres (66 ft) wide waterfall. It is possible to walk behind its cascading curtain of water, although the rock face can be slippery.

Rere Rock Slide has been included in the NZ Automobile Association's 101 Must-do places for Kiwis. It is a smooth, natural rock formation 60 metres (200 ft) long, at an angle of about 30°, over which the Wharekopae River rushes like water in a giant water slide. It can be slid down on boogie boards or tyres.

== Demographics ==
Rere locality covers 243.76 km^{2} (94.12 sq mi). It is part of the Hangaroae statistical area.

Historical population
Year	Pop.	±% p.a.
2006	129	—
2013	108	−2.51%
2018	123	+2.64%
2023	135	+1.88%

Rere had a population of 135 in the 2023 New Zealand census, an increase of 12 people (9.8%) since the 2018 census, and an increase of 27 people (25.0%) since the 2013 census. There were 78 males and 57 females in 45 dwellings. 2.2% of people identified as LGBTIQ+. The median age was 27.3 years (compared with 38.1 years nationally). There were 48 people (35.6%) aged under 15 years, 27 (20.0%) aged 15 to 29, 57 (42.2%) aged 30 to 64, and 6 (4.4%) aged 65 or older.

People could identify as more than one ethnicity. The results were 77.8% European (Pākehā), 33.3% Māori, 2.2% Pasifika, and 4.4% other, which includes people giving their ethnicity as "New Zealander". English was spoken by 97.8%, Māori by 8.9%, and other languages by 2.2%. No language could be spoken by 2.2% (e.g. too young to talk). The percentage of people born overseas was 2.2, compared with 28.8% nationally.

Religious affiliations were 26.7% Christian, and 2.2% Māori religious beliefs. People who answered that they had no religion were 64.4%, and 6.7% of people did not answer the census question.

Of those at least 15 years old, 12 (13.8%) people had a bachelor's or higher degree, 54 (62.1%) had a post-high school certificate or diploma, and 21 (24.1%) people exclusively held high school qualifications. The median income was $47,300, compared with $41,500 nationally. 3 people (3.4%) earned over $100,000 compared to 12.1% nationally. The employment status of those at least 15 was 60 (69.0%) full-time and 15 (17.2%) part-time.

== Parks ==
Rere Falls and the neighbouring Rere Reserve includes a walkway, cycleway and picnic area with public toilets, and a waterway for swimming and trout fishing.

== Education ==
Rere School is a Year 1–8 co-educational state primary school with a roll of 32 as of July 2026. The school opened in 1914, and moved to its current site in 1939.
