= Waihora River =

- Route of the Waihora River
- Mouth of the Waihora River Waihora River (North Island)
- Native name: Waihora (Māori)

Location
- Country: New Zealand
- Island: North Island
- Region: Gisborne

Physical characteristics
- Source: Mākiri
  - coordinates: 38.46871°S 178.01727°E
- Mouth: Waipaoa River
  - coordinates: 38°27′19″S 177°52′16″E
- Length: 24 km (15 mi)

Basin features
- Progression: Waihora River → Waipaoa River → Poverty Bay → Pacific Ocean
- Tributaries
  - left: Ōariki Stream
  - right: Urumatai Stream, Motumate Stream, Kanakanaia Stream, Mākōtukutuku Stream, Pōtātua Stream, Kākānui Stream
- Bridges: Frasers Bridge, Ribbons Bridge, Bellerbys No. 2 Bridge, Bellerbys No. 1 Bridge, Atkins Bridge

The Waihora River is a river of the Gisborne Region of New Zealand's North Island. It flows generally west from its sources in rough hill country southwest of Tolaga Bay to reach the Waipaoa River at Te Karaka.

The New Zealand Ministry for Culture and Heritage gives a translation of "spread-out waters" for Waihora.

== See also ==
- List of rivers of New Zealand
