= Waikohu County =

Coordinates: 38°28′S 177°52′E

- County of New Zealand
- 1908–1989
- Capital: Te Karaka
- Area
- 2,646.96 km^{2} (1,022.00 sq mi)
- History
  - Established: 1908
  - Disestablished: 1989
- Today part of: North Island

Waikohu County was one of the counties of New Zealand in the North Island.

== Splendid Record of Progress ==
NB: This section is derived from text in Mackay, Joseph Angus (1949). Historic Poverty Bay and the East Coast, N.I., N.Z, available here at the New Zealand Electronic Text Centre.

Waikohu County was constituted in October, 1908. About two-thirds of the 2,300-square-kilometre (900 sq mi) area was then in productive use. Much of the remainder was in heavy bush. Practically all the roads — 303 kilometres (188 mi) — were unmetalled, many of them being only 2.7-metre (9 ft) tracks. The council first met on 3 March 1909, its personnel being: W. D. S. MacDonald, A. M. Lewis, H. E. Tiffen, M. Campbell, H. Telford and E. M. Hutchinson. Mr. MacDonald was elected chairman.

The county took over a loan of NZ£4,941 from the Waikohu Road Board, also loans amounting to £25,907 from Cook County. It had, up to 31 March 1947, raised loans amounting, in the aggregate, to £88,815, all the money being borrowed in New Zealand. Debentures amounting to £42,000 were converted in 1935, and the conversion loan will expire in 1960. The net public debt at 31 March 1947, was £49,894. Approximately one-half will be paid off by 1950. Of the loans raised by the county, £8,500 was for bridges, £9,500 for homes for county employees, £6,600 towards the cost of building Cook Hospital (1914), and £63,455 for the construction of, and the metalling of, roads.

By 1947, 3.6 kilometres (2 1/4 mi) of roads had been sealed, 478.8 kilometres (297 1/2 mi) metalled, and 163 kilometres (101 mi) formed to a width of 4.9 metres (16 ft), but not metalled. The bridges then numbered 66, with an aggregate length of 2,104 metres (6,903 ft). Te Karaka (the headquarters) was constituted a town district in 1916. Its board controls sanitation, a library, the side roads and footpaths. The main road is a State highway.

Statistics.—Rates: 1909–10, £7,813; 1946–7, £29,572. Ratepayers: 1909–10, 335; 1946–7, 623. Rateable properties: 1909–10, 637; 1946–47, 1,239. Capital value of the county: 1909–10, £1,407,172; 1949, £3,829,879.

Chairmen: W. D. S. MacDonald, 1909–11; E. M. Hutchinson, 1911–14; Cyril White, 1914–17; L. B. Tulloch, 1917–20; T. B. Spence, 1920–29; A. A. Fraser, 1929–. G. Warren was clerk from 1908 until 1915; J. G. Appleton (1915–49); then N. W. McCormick. Engineers: W. S. Charlesworth, 1909–10; J. Mouat, 1910–14; F. C. Hay, 1915–16; W. Whittaker, 1916–17; A. H. Benham, 1917–22; A. G. M. Lucas, 1922–45; S. R. Currie, 1945–.

== See also ==
- Counties of New Zealand

== Notes ==
NB: This section is derived from text in Mackay, Joseph Angus (1949). Historic Poverty Bay and the East Coast, N.I., N.Z, available here at the New Zealand Electronic Text Centre.

There were 96 Europeans in the Waikohu Road District in 1878. The number of Maoris then is not officially known. In 1906, the combined population was 1858. By 1926, the European population was: County, 2,604; Te Karaka T.D., 321; Maoris, 488 and 48 respectively; grand total, 3,461. In 1945 the figures were: Europeans—County, 1,912; Te Karaka T.D., 262; Maoris—County, 919; Te Karaka T.D., 109; grand total, 3,202, plus 3%. to make up for residents absent on war activities.

Te Karaka township site was covered with scrub and surrounded by heavy bush in the early 1880s. Its first white resident was George Burgess, a “bullocky.” A shepherd named McKinnon then built an hotel, the Isle of Mull, in thick bush near the river. In 1883, Mr. Hutton erected a sawmill at the back of the site on which the school now stands. A saddler's shop and a store followed. The sawmill was taken over by W. King in 1884. His manager (Alfred H. Salmon) and his wife were the first European married residents. A school, with only five pupils, was opened by C. E. Bolton in 1886. William Hunter was the first mailman.
