= Waipaoa River =

River in New Zealand

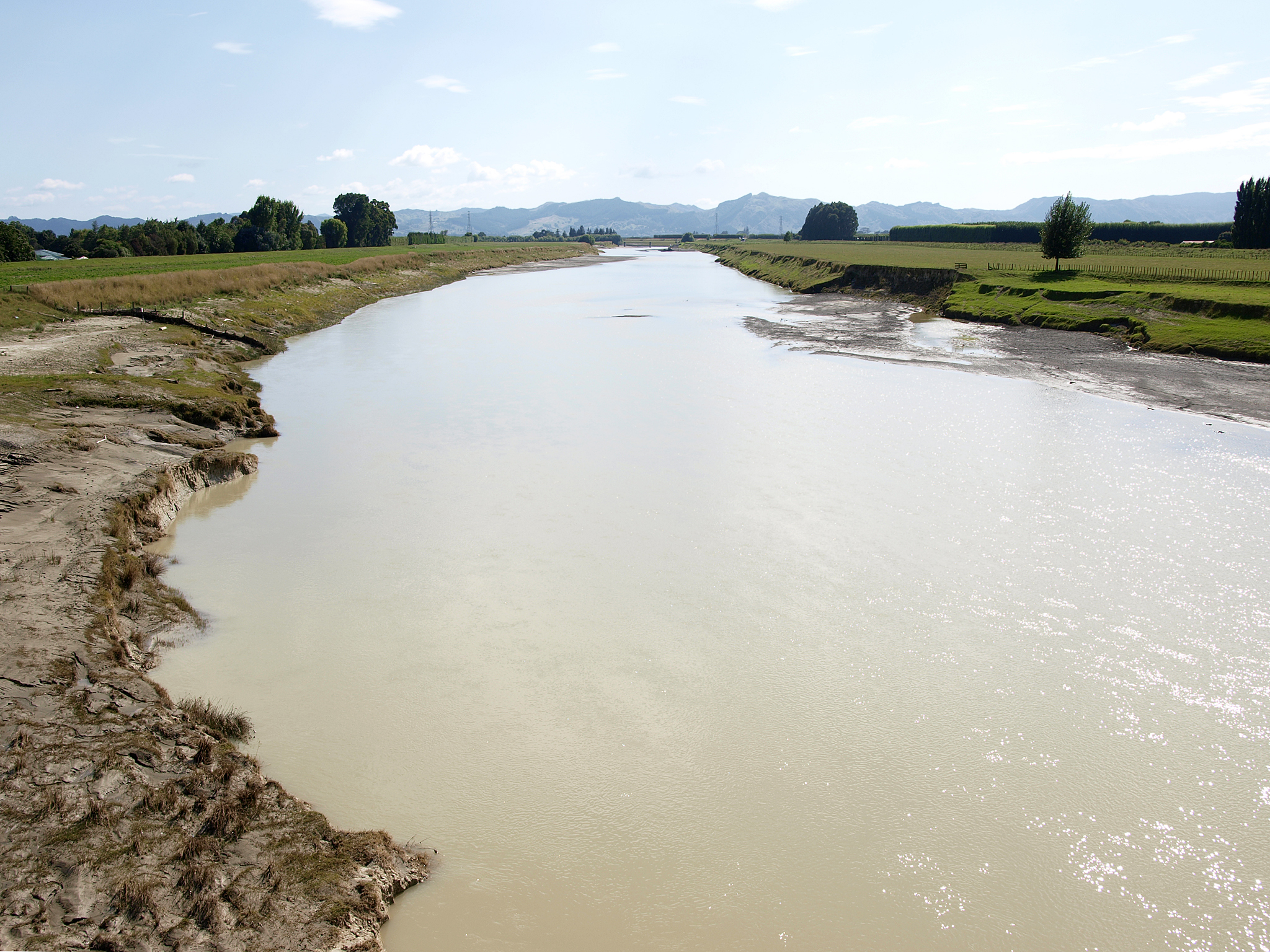
- Looking upstream to the north-east from the Wharerata Road (State Highway 2) bridge
- Route of the Waipaoa River
- Mouth of the Waipaoa River Waipaoa River (North Island)
- Native name: Waipaoa (Māori)

Location
- Country: New Zealand
- Island: North Island
- Region: Gisborne

Physical characteristics
- Source: Kererūhuahua, Raukūmara Range
  - coordinates: 38.15845°S 177.89698°E
  - elevation: 965 m (3,166 ft)
- Mouth: Poverty Bay
  - coordinates: 38°42′39″S 177°56′21″E
- Length: 32 km (20 mi)
- Basin size: 2,165 km^{2} (836 sq mi)

Basin features
- Progression: Waipaoa River → Poverty Bay → Pacific Ocean
- Tributaries
  - left: Wairangiora Stream, Matau Stream, Tōtara Stream, Whakauaponga Stream, Mangaorongo Stream, Mākara Stream, Mākahakaha Stream, Mangataikapua Stream, Waingaromia River, Mangakino Stream, Hauomatuku Stream, Taengamata Stream, Waihora River, Mangaoai Stream, Ngakoroa Stream
  - right: Waimatau Stream, Tikimore Stream, Matakonekone Stream, Weraroa Stream, Ruahine Stream, Mangatū River, Whatatutu Stream, Wheao Stream, Waikohu River, Maungatarehu Stream, Hakanui Stream, Waiataokete Stream, Pouaru Stream, Whakaahu Stream, Te Ārai River, Karaua Stream
- Bridges: Kaitaratahi Bridge, Waipaoa River Bridge

The Waipaoa River is in the Gisborne District, in the northeast of New Zealand's North Island. It rises on the eastern slopes of the Raukūmara Range, flowing south for 80 kilometres (50 mi) to reach Poverty Bay and the Pacific Ocean just south of Gisborne. For about half of this distance, its valley is followed by State Highway 2. The river has several important tributaries, among them the Wharekōpae, Waikohu, Mangatū, Te Ārai, Waingaromia and Waihora rivers. Major settlements along the banks of the river include Te Karaka, Ormond, and Pātūtahi. Waipaoa is Māori for "Pāoa's river", Pāoa being the captain of the Horouta canoe (hence "Waipaoa River" is tautological).

The river has formed the fertile and highly productive Poverty Bay flats on the edge of Gisborne. The Waipaoa River Flood Control Scheme was built in the 1950s. Stopbanks are to be raised by 2031, as eroded soil, especially from the Waingaromia and Mangatū catchments, has built up the river bed, the annual flow of sediment being 15 million tonnes. Despite this pollution, many of the headwaters have indigenous fish.

== Environmental concerns ==
In the lower river, water quality is poor for E. coli, clarity, turbidity, ammoniacal nitrogen and total phosphorus. The sediment, building up at a rate of several centimetres a year even many kilometres into Poverty Bay, shows that removal of tall trees such as rimu, mataī, beeches and kahikatea and subsequent conversion of forests to farmland by the early 20th century increased sediment flows by 2 to 3 times the former rate.

== See also ==
- Te Kurī o Pāoa/Young Nick's Head, headland associated with Pāoa.
- List of rivers of New Zealand
