= New Zealand Electronic Text Collection =

Digital library of New Zealand and Pacific Island texts and materials

- Website type: Digital library
- Available in: English
- Website: nzetc.victoria.ac.nz
- Commercial: No
- Registration: Free
- Launched: 2002
- Current status: Active

The New Zealand Electronic Text Collection (NZETC; Māori: Te Pūhikotuhi o Aotearoa) is a freely accessible online archive of New Zealand and Pacific Islands texts and heritage materials that are held by the Victoria University of Wellington Library. It was named the New Zealand Electronic Text Centre until October 2012.

At the beginning of 2012 the collection contained over 1,600 texts (around 65,000 pages) and received over 10,000 visits each day. It is one of two similar collections of older New Zealand publications that have been digitised, the other being the Early New Zealand Books collection from the University of Auckland Library.

The New Zealand Electronic Text Collection was transferred from Victoria University of Wellington to the National Library of New Zealand on 2 July 2024. The National Library makes it available in its web archive.

== Projects and activities ==
The Library worked with partners within Victoria University on projects for the NZETC including:

- Turbine, a literary journal (in cooperation with the International Institute of Modern Letters)
- Best New Zealand Poems (in cooperation with the International Institute of Modern Letters)
- Tidal Pools, to make available texts on Pacific islands history, language, culture and politics (in cooperation with Va'aomanu Pasifika, the Pacific Studies unit)
- Design Review, a Wellington architecture and design magazine from the late 1940s and early 1950s

The NZETC worked with external partners, such as:

- Digitisation and e-publishing of the Transactions and Proceedings of the Royal Society of New Zealand 1868–1961 (in cooperation with the National Library of New Zealand and the Alexander Turnbull Library)
- Learning Media (in cooperation with the Ministry of Education)
- La Trobe Journal (in cooperation with the Australian State Library of Victoria)

== Copyrights ==
When original texts are out of copyright NZETC provides the digitised version under a Creative Commons Share-alike License (currently CC BY SA 3.0 NZ).

== Methodology and technology ==
The NZETC is a part of the Text Encoding Initiative community of practice. They encode all their textual content in TEI XML which is transformed dynamically into HTML using XSLT. Authority files are maintained for works, people, places, organisations and, unusually, ships. Topic Maps are used for the main website structure.
