= Joseph Angus Mackay =

New Zealand journalist, newspaper editor and historian

Joseph Angus Mackay (9 September 1882–30 September 1952) was a New Zealand journalist, newspaper editor and historian. He was born in Invercargill, Southland, New Zealand on 9 September 1882.
