= Te Karaka =

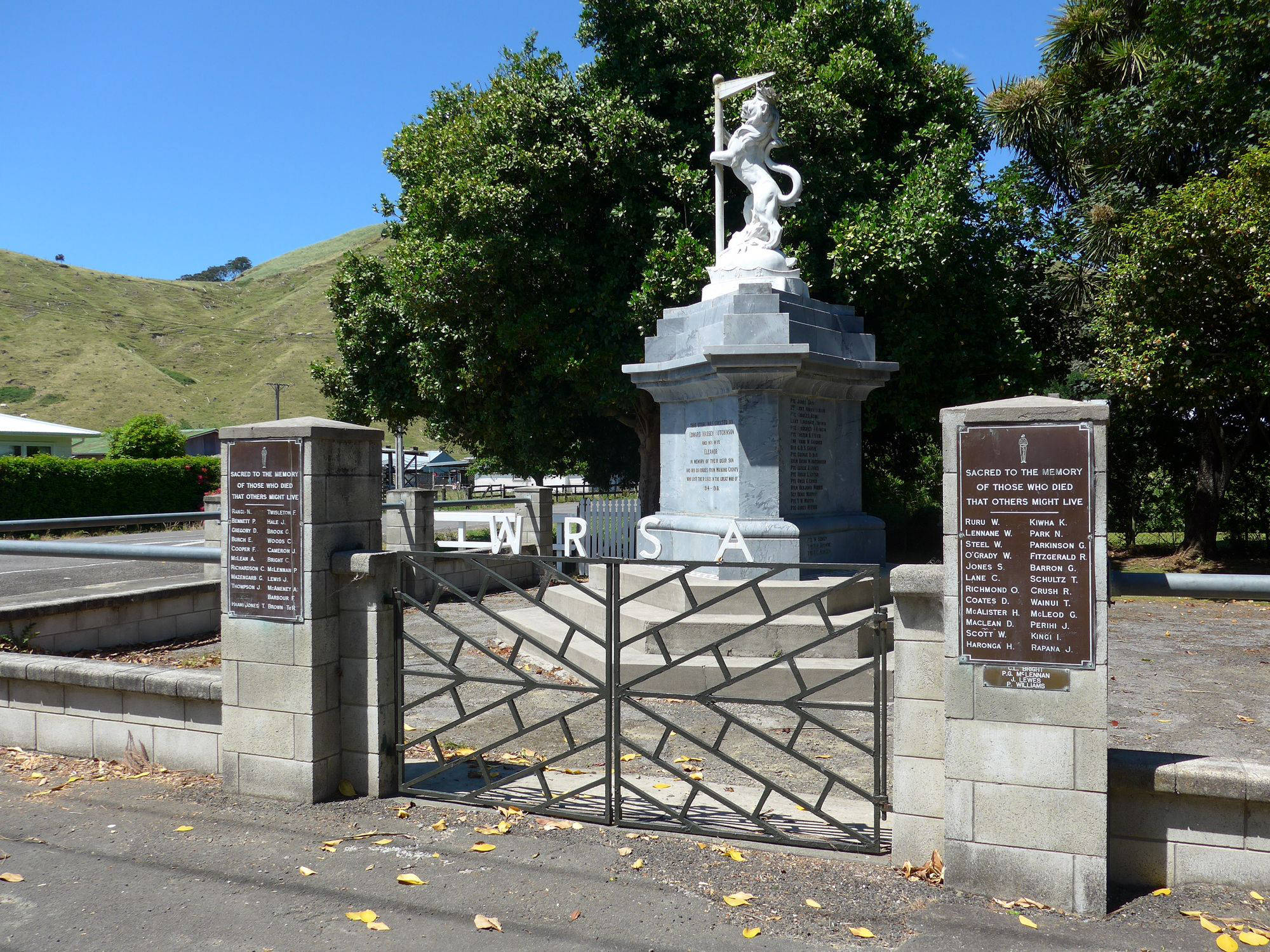
- Te Karaka War Memorial
- Interactive map of Te Karaka
- Coordinates: 38°28′S 177°52′E
- Country: New Zealand
- District: Gisborne District
- Ward: Tairāwhiti General Ward
- Electorates: East Cape; Ikaroa-Rāwhiti (Māori)

Government
  - Territorial authority: Gisborne District Council
  - Mayor of Gisborne: Rehette Stoltz
  - East Cape MP: Dana Kirkpatrick
  - Ikaroa-Rāwhiti MP: Cushla Tangaere-Manuel

Area
  - Total: 2.92 km^{2} (1.13 sq mi)

Population (June 2025)
  - Total: 600
  - Density: 210/km^{2} (530/sq mi)

Te Karaka is a small settlement inland from Gisborne, in the northeast of New Zealand's North Island. It is located in the valley of the Waipaoa River close to its junction with its tributary, the Waihora River. Te Karaka is located on State Highway 2, and is the largest settlement between Gisborne and Ōpōtiki in the Bay of Plenty.

Te Karaka holds the current North Island weather high record, set on 3 February 2020, at 40 °C recorded at 4 pm that day.

== Demographics ==
Statistics New Zealand describes Te Karaka as a rural settlement, which covers 2.92 km^{2} (1.13 sq mi). It had an estimated population of 600 as of June 2025, with a population density of 205 people per km^{2}. It is part of the larger Waipaoa statistical area.

Historical population for Te Karaka
| Year | Pop. | ±% p.a. |
|---|---|---|
| 2006 | 546 | — |
| 2013 | 483 | −1.74% |
| 2018 | 522 | +1.57% |
| 2023 | 576 | +1.99% |

Te Karaka had a population of 576 in the 2023 New Zealand census, an increase of 54 people (10.3%) since the 2018 census, and an increase of 93 people (19.3%) since the 2013 census. There were 282 males, 294 females, and 3 people of other genders in 171 dwellings. 3.1% of people identified as LGBTIQ+. The median age was 31.9 years (compared with 38.1 years nationally). There were 147 people (25.5%) aged under 15 years, 123 (21.4%) aged 15 to 29, 246 (42.7%) aged 30 to 64, and 63 (10.9%) aged 65 or older.

People could identify as more than one ethnicity. The results were 42.2% European (Pākehā); 78.1% Māori; 3.6% Pasifika; 0.5% Asian; 1.0% Middle Eastern, Latin American and African New Zealanders (MELAA); and 1.0% other, which includes people giving their ethnicity as "New Zealander". English was spoken by 97.9%, Māori by 22.9%, Samoan by 1.0%, and other languages by 0.5%. No language could be spoken by 1.6% (e.g. too young to talk). New Zealand Sign Language was known by 0.5%. The percentage of people born overseas was 3.1, compared with 28.8% nationally.

Religious affiliations were 19.8% Christian, 20.3% Māori religious beliefs, 0.5% New Age, and 0.5% other religions. People who answered that they had no religion were 49.5%, and 9.9% of people did not answer the census question.

Of those at least 15 years old, 42 (9.8%) people had a bachelor's or higher degree, 231 (53.8%) had a post-high school certificate or diploma, and 156 (36.4%) people exclusively held high school qualifications. The median income was $31,400, compared with $41,500 nationally. 9 people (2.1%) earned over $100,000 compared to 12.1% nationally. The employment status of those at least 15 was 207 (48.3%) full-time, 48 (11.2%) part-time, and 24 (5.6%) unemployed.

== Waipaoa statistical area ==
Waipaoa statistical area, which also includes Otoko, covers 2,277.33 km^{2} (879.28 sq mi) and had an estimated population of 2,190 as of June 2025, with a population density of 1 people per km^{2}.

Historical population for Waipaoa
| Year | Pop. | ±% p.a. |
|---|---|---|
| 2006 | 2,127 | — |
| 2013 | 1,935 | −1.34% |
| 2018 | 1,953 | +0.19% |
| 2023 | 2,127 | +1.72% |

Waipaoa had a population of 2,127 in the 2023 New Zealand census, an increase of 174 people (8.9%) since the 2018 census, and an increase of 192 people (9.9%) since the 2013 census. There were 1,104 males, 1,017 females, and 6 people of other genders in 711 dwellings. 2.0% of people identified as LGBTIQ+. The median age was 35.1 years (compared with 38.1 years nationally). There were 495 people (23.3%) aged under 15 years, 432 (20.3%) aged 15 to 29, 927 (43.6%) aged 30 to 64, and 273 (12.8%) aged 65 or older.

People could identify as more than one ethnicity. The results were 61.8% European (Pākehā); 56.1% Māori; 2.4% Pasifika; 1.1% Asian; 0.3% Middle Eastern, Latin American and African New Zealanders (MELAA); and 1.4% other, which includes people giving their ethnicity as "New Zealander". English was spoken by 97.0%, Māori by 16.4%, Samoan by 0.3%, and other languages by 1.7%. No language could be spoken by 2.1% (e.g. too young to talk). New Zealand Sign Language was known by 0.4%. The percentage of people born overseas was 4.8, compared with 28.8% nationally.

Religious affiliations were 24.5% Christian, 12.6% Māori religious beliefs, 0.6% New Age, and 0.4% other religions. People who answered that they had no religion were 53.7%, and 8.5% of people did not answer the census question.

Of those at least 15 years old, 201 (12.3%) people had a bachelor's or higher degree, 966 (59.2%) had a post-high school certificate or diploma, and 465 (28.5%) people exclusively held high school qualifications. The median income was $36,000, compared with $41,500 nationally. 84 people (5.1%) earned over $100,000 compared to 12.1% nationally. The employment status of those at least 15 was 837 (51.3%) full-time, 231 (14.2%) part-time, and 48 (2.9%) unemployed.

== Parks ==
The settlement has a sports ground and local park, Te Karaka Recreation Ground.

== Marae ==
Te Karaka has three marae belonging to the hapū of Te Aitanga-a-Māhaki.

Rangatira Marae and Whakahau meeting house is a meeting place of Ngāti Wahia.

Takipu Marae and Te Poho o Pikihoro meeting house is a meeting place of Te Whānau a Taupara.

Tapuihikitia and Te Aroha meeting house is a meeting place of Ngā Pōtiki and Te Whānau a Taupara. In October 2020, the Government committed $327,200 from the Provincial Growth Fund to upgrade the marae, creating an estimated 6 jobs.

== Education ==
Te Karaka Area School is a Year 1–13 co-educational state area school with a roll of 110 students as of July 2026. The school opened in 2011, replacing the local primary school and Waikohu College.
