= Hikuwai River =

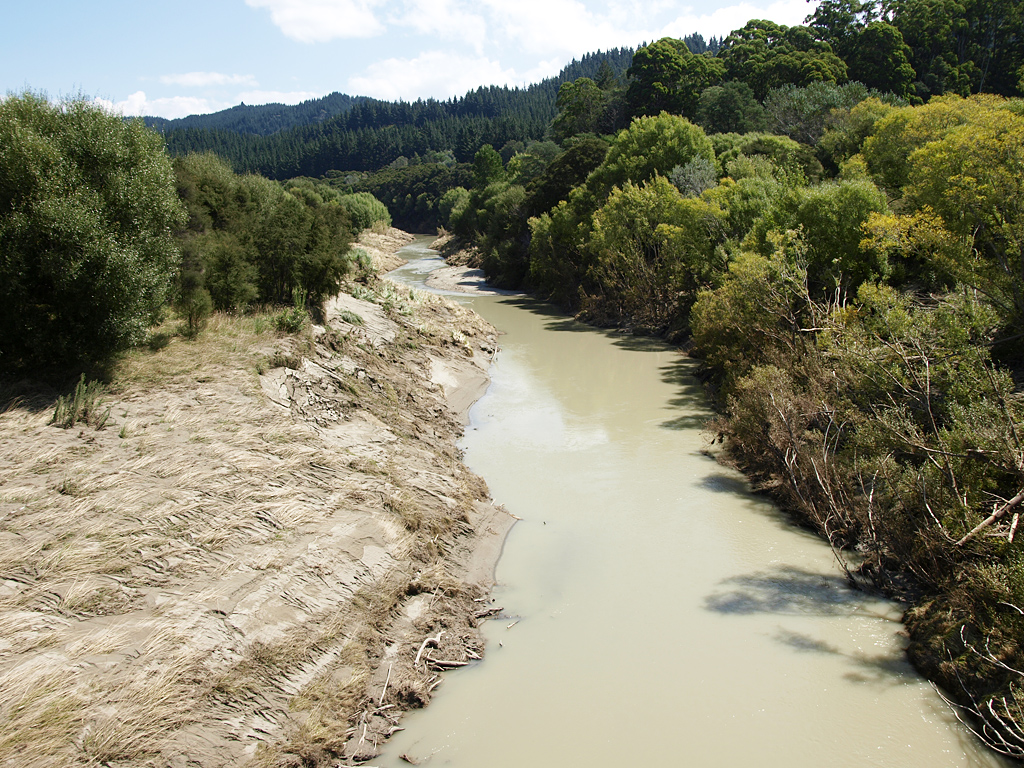
- Hikuwai River seen from Hikuwai Bailey Bridge Number 1
- Route of the Hikuwai River
- Mouth of the Hikuwai River Hikuwai River (North Island)

Location
- Country: New Zealand
- Island: North Island
- Region: Gisborne

Physical characteristics
- Source: Confluence of Waiau River and Mangarākai Stream
  - coordinates: 38.1575°S 178.2500°E
- Mouth: Ūawa River
  - coordinates: 38°18′13″S 178°15′23″E
- Length: 5 km (3.1 mi)

Basin features
- Progression: Pangopango Stream → Waiau River → Hikuwai River → Ūawa River → Pacific Ocean
- River system: Ūawa River
- Tributaries
  - left: Makōkōmuka Stream, Mangahauini Stream, Kotingatahataha Stream, Māhanga Stream
  - right: Mākiore Stream, Waikare Stream, Mangaroa Stream, Waitoroko Stream
- Bridges: Halls Bridge, Hikuwai Bridge Number 1, Hikuwai Bridge Number 1 Replacement, Hikuwai Bridge Number 2, Hikuwai Bridge Number 3, Hikuwai Bridge Number 4

The Hikuwai River is the name for the middle section of the Ūawa River in the Gisborne Region of New Zealand. The river flows south through a valley between two hill ridges to the north of Tolaga Bay, and for most of its length runs parallel with the Pacific coast, which lies 5 kilometres (3 mi) to the east. The Hikuwai river section ends at the confluence with the Mangatokerau River, 10 kilometres (6 mi) before the Ūawa River flows into the sea at Tolaga Bay.

In March 2022, heavy rainfall in the region caused the river to rise by over 9.6 metres, causing the nearby town of Mangatuna to be evacuated.

== See also ==
- List of rivers of New Zealand
