= Hinematioro =

Māori ariki tapairu

Hinematioro (c. 1750–1823) was an eighteenth-century Māori ariki tapairu of Te Aitanga-a-Hauiti based at Ūawa (Tolaga Bay) on the East Coast of New Zealand's North Island. Through her senior whakapapa and extensive kinship connections, she exercised influence across much of the East Coast and is regarded as one of the foremost Māori leaders of her generation.

Hinematioro's authority became proverbial among Māori, and contemporary traditions record that visitors from throughout the East Coast travelled to Ūawa to acknowledge her mana. Her descendants included the celebrated nineteenth-century ariki Te Kani-a-Takirau, while her chiefly line traced descent from Paikea through Rongomaituaho and Hauiti.

== Early life ==
Hinematioro was born about the middle of the eighteenth century. Her father was Tānetokorangi, a grandson of Konohi of Whāngārā, while her mother, Ngunguru-te-rangi, descended from senior Ngāti Porou and Te Whānau-ā-Apanui lines. Their marriage formed part of a peacemaking alliance between leading East Coast kin groups, and Hinematioro inherited senior chiefly descent through both parents.

She married Te Hoatiki, a grandson of her great-uncle Te Rīwai. They had four daughters, although only two survived to adulthood. Their eldest surviving daughter, Ngārangikahiwa, became the mother of Te Kani-a-Takirau, while their younger daughter, Te Kakari, married the Te Aitanga-a-Hauiti warrior Te Āmaru Kaitangata.

She belonged to the senior chiefly family of Ūawa, where political authority rested in the descendants of Hauiti. By the latter half of the eighteenth century she had become recognised as the leading ariki of the district.

== Leadership ==
Hinematioro presided over Te Aitanga-a-Hauiti during a period of prosperity before sustained European settlement. Contemporary traditions describe Ūawa as a densely populated district with extensive cultivations, fisheries and fortified settlements. Her influence extended beyond her own iwi through alliances, marriage connections and whakapapa relationships with neighbouring peoples, including Rongowhakaata, Ngāti Porou and Te Aitanga-a-Māhaki.

Her residence at Ūawa became an important political and cultural centre. Tribal traditions describe visitors arriving from throughout the East Coast bearing gifts and acknowledging her status. Her authority rested not only on senior whakapapa but also on her ability to maintain relationships between numerous hapū and iwi across the region.

Hinematioro and her husband, Te Hoatiki, were also associated with Te Kaha, where tradition records that they cultivated a renowned kūmara garden known as Māra-a-Te Atua. According to tradition, the first harvest yielded 400 kete of kūmara, and the abundance of the garden contributed to Hinematioro's reputation for hospitality and the generous redistribution of food.

The fame of Māra-a-Te Atua was commemorated in a saying attributed to the elder Tamahae of Maungaroa:

He whā-te-rau ki Raemaihi, e ara tō ingoa; he whā-te-rau ki Māra-a-Te Atua, kāore e ara tō ingoa.

"Though Raemaihi also yielded four hundred baskets, it was Māra-a-Te Atua that brought lasting renown."

Hinematioro was remembered for her generosity and manaakitanga. She hosted large gatherings, redistributed wealth through gifts and feasting, and became renowned for the abundance of her cultivations. Later traditions linked this prosperity with the ancestral knowledge associated with Paikea and the East Coast whare wānanga, particularly Te Rāwheoro.

One of the most celebrated gifts associated with Hinematioro was a massive tree trunk presented by Tamatere of Ūawa. It was transported to Whāngārā and erected as the elevated food store Te Whatakai-a-Hinematioro, also known as Te Kāuta-a-Hinematioro, beside her carved house Te Hamuti. The surviving lower section of the structure was transferred to Tairāwhiti Museum in 1954.

== Cook's visit ==
When Lieutenant James Cook visited Ūawa aboard HMS Endeavour in October 1769, Hinematioro was the paramount leader of the district. Although Cook did not meet her directly, members of his expedition encountered her people, and the district was described as prosperous and extensively cultivated. The Tahitian navigator Tupaia was able to communicate with local Māori, helping to establish largely peaceful relations during the visit.

A carved poupou prepared for a meeting house associated with Hinematioro was collected during Cook's first voyage and eventually entered the collections of the University of Tübingen in Germany. Members of Te Aitanga-a-Hauiti rediscovered the carving during the 1990s, and it became an important focus for renewed relationships between the iwi and its overseas taonga.

One of the most significant taonga associated with Hinematioro was a carved pou from her settlement that remained in Germany for more than 250 years before being returned permanently to Ūawa in 2026 following an agreement between the University of Tübingen and Te Aitanga-a-Hauiti.

== Death ==
In 1823, during conflict involving Te Wera Hauraki and Ngāpuhi, Hinematioro took refuge with her people at Te Pourewa pā. As the pā neared capture, she and her grandson Te Hēmanawa attempted to escape by canoe after being lowered from the island cliffs. The canoe capsized and both drowned. According to Whāngārā tradition, her body was recovered and buried at Te Ana-a-Paikea on Whāngārā Island, where Te Kani-a-Takirau was later interred.

== Legacy ==
Hinematioro's mana became deeply embedded in the traditions of Te Aitanga-a-Hauiti and the wider East Coast. She is remembered as one of the greatest women leaders in Māori history and as an exemplar of the role of an ariki tapairu. Her grandson Te Kani-a-Takirau inherited the senior chiefly lines associated with her and became the foremost ariki of Te Aitanga-a-Hauiti during the early nineteenth century.

Her whakapapa continues to underpin the identity of Te Aitanga-a-Hauiti. Modern scholarship has emphasised the enduring relationships between Hinematioro, Te Kani-a-Takirau, Paikea and the iwi's ancestral taonga, viewing these connections as central to the continuation of Hauiti traditions and identity.

In 2026, Te Aitanga-a-Hauiti commemorated the permanent return of Te Pou o Hinematioro to Ūawa after 256 years overseas. The repatriation was accompanied by the exhibition Te Pou o Hinematioro – He Ihu tō mai nō te Pō at Tairāwhiti Museum, highlighting Hinematioro's continuing significance to the iwi and the wider East Coast.

== See also ==
- Te Aitanga-a-Hauiti
- Te Kani-a-Takirau
- Te Rawheoro
