= Heva Tūpāpāʻu =

Tahitian funeral costume

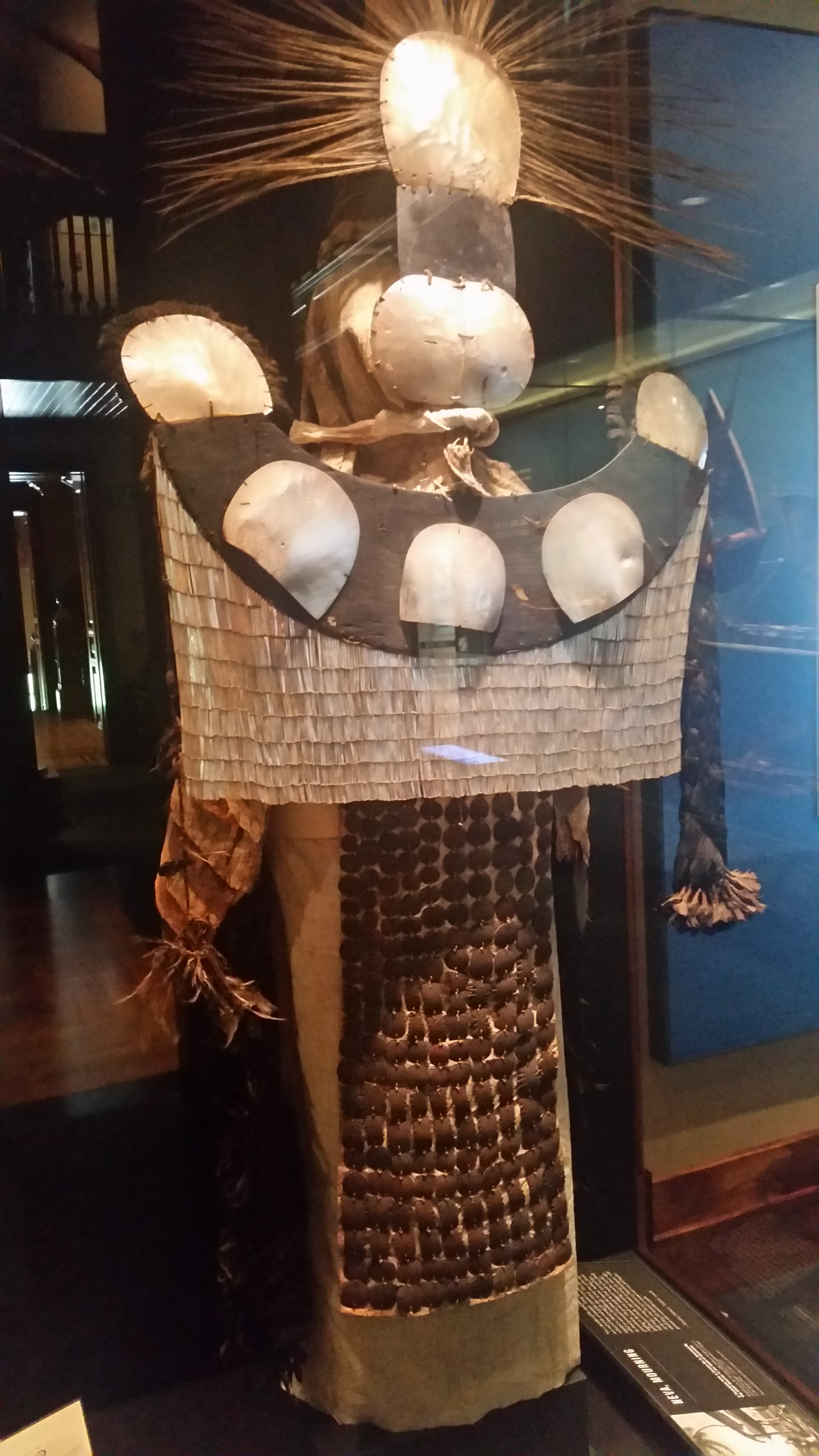
Complete mourning dress from Tahiti on display in the Bishop Museum, Hawaii

A Heva Tūpāpā’u, also known as a Mourner's Dress, is a costume traditionally worn in Tahiti as part of mourning ceremonies. It was traditionally worn after the death of an important person in Tahiti culture, in a ceremony that could last weeks or months. Very few Heva Tūpāpā’u survive today.

Examples of materials used to make Heva Tūpāpā’u include coconut fibers and coconut shells, pearls, feathers, and barkcloth, all of which were considered "ritually significant".

It is estimated that James Cook brought approximately 10 Heva Tūpāpā’u back with him to Europe in 1775 after collecting them during his expeditions. The Heva Tūpāpā’u also inspired paintings by famous European artists such as Herman Spöring Jr, and Sarah Stone. The British Museum describes a Heva Tūpāpā’u held in their museum as "one of the most important objects in the British Museum's collections."

== Museum collections ==
Examples of Heva Tūpāpā’u are present in museums in Hawaii, Germany, Italy, New Zealand, and the United Kingdom.The following institutions contain complete Heva Tūpāpā’u in their collections. Other collections in Sydney, St Petersburg, Berne and Cambridge hold partial mourning dresses.

- Pitt Rivers Museum, Oxford, collected during James Cook's second voyage (1772–1775).
- Royal Albert Memorial Museum, Exeter, acquired by Francis Godolphin Bond in 1792.
- Perth Museum, acquired by physician David Ramsay (1794–1860).
- British Museum, London, collected by James Cook in 1774.
- Museum of New Zealand, Wellington
- Bernice Pauahi Bishop Museum, Hawaii
- Sammlung für Völkerkunde, Göttingen
- Ethnological Museum of Berlin
- Museum of Anthropology and Ethnography, Florence
