= Herman Spöring Sr. =

18th-century Finnish physician and naturalist

Herman Diedrich Spöring
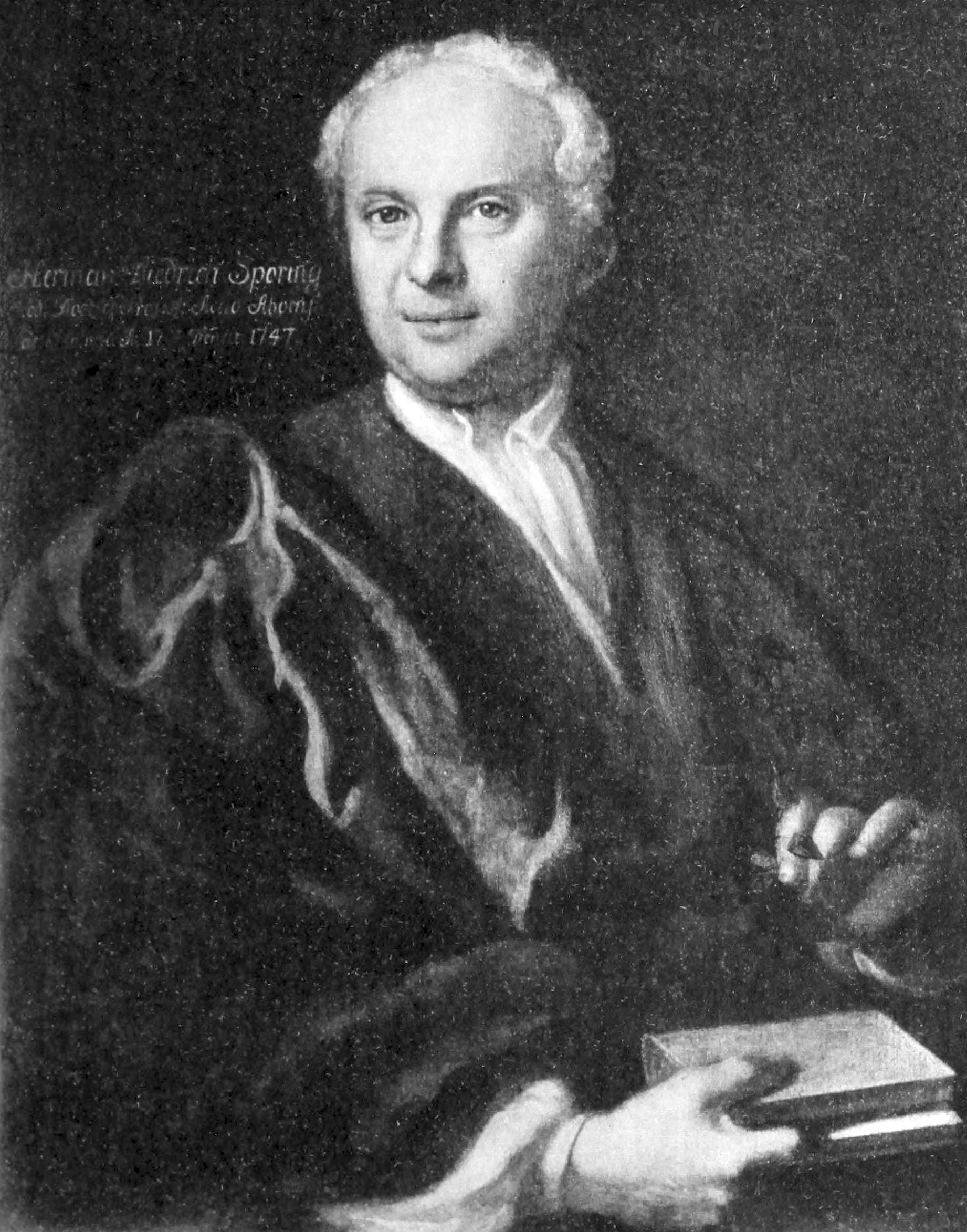
- Herman Spöring Sr.
- Born: 19 October 1701; Stockholm, Sweden
- Died: 17 June 1747 (aged 45); Turku, Finland
- Occupations: Professor of medicine, physician, naturalist
- Known for: First in the Nordic countries to describe variolisation in print

Herman Diedrich Spöring (19 October 1701 – 17 June 1747) was a Swedish-Finnish physician, professor, and naturalist at the Royal Academy of Turku. He is chiefly remembered for modernising medical education in Finland and for being the first in the Nordic countries to describe variolation — an early form of smallpox inoculation — in print. During nearly two decades as the only academically trained physician in Finland, he laid the foundations for clinical medicine, anatomical teaching, and natural history collections at the academy.

His son Herman Diedrich Spöring Jr. (1733–1771) was a naturalist and draughtsman who sailed with James Cook on the Endeavour expedition (1768–71) and died in the Indian Ocean.

== Life ==
=== Early life and education ===
Spöring was born in Stockholm, where his father Eberhard Christian Spöring was vice-rector of the German School. He enrolled at Uppsala University in 1717, studying medicine under Olof Rudbeck the Younger and Lars Roberg, and later continued privately in Stockholm under the anatomist Magnus von Bromell, in whose household he served as a tutor and gained access to a large library and natural history collection.

In 1722 Spöring travelled abroad to complete his studies. He spent two years in Leiden attending the lectures of Herman Boerhaave and Willem 's Gravesande, then a year in Paris practising anatomy and visiting hospitals, and a period in the Harz mining region of Germany. On his return journey he stopped in Amsterdam, where he drew specimens in Albertus Seba's natural history cabinet. On 18 May 1726 he defended his doctoral thesis at Harderwijk and was awarded the degree of Doctor of Medicine.

=== Professor at Turku ===
Spöring returned to Sweden in 1727 and the following year was appointed professor of medicine at the Royal Academy of Turku, the only such chair in Finland. In his inaugural address he argued for the importance of modern natural philosophy to medicine, aligning himself with the European scientific tradition. Among his like-minded colleagues at the academy were the naturalists Johan Browallius and Carl Fredrik Mennander, the physicist Jakob Gadolin, and the mathematician Nils Hasselbom. Together with Browallius and Mennander, Spöring helped inaugurate a new era at the academy aimed at promoting applied, utilitarian science.

He served as rector of the academy for the academic years 1737–38 and 1746–47. When a fire destroyed the academy library in 1738, he took part in planning its replacement, which opened in 1741. After his death the academy purchased his private book collection.

Because no other trained physician existed in Finland for most of his career, Spöring was also required to carry out duties normally belonging to public health authorities, including inspecting pharmacies and conducting examinations for the apothecary's licence.

== Medical work and reforms ==
=== Clinical practice ===
Following his teacher Boerhaave, Spöring held that medicine should develop as a science grounded in clinical experience, combined with anatomy and physiology, while acknowledging that physical methods could explain material processes but not phenomena belonging to the soul. His published medical articles dealt almost exclusively with case reports, most of them unusual or exceptional cases.

Spöring practised at the mineral spring at Kuppis outside Turku, the only therapeutic facility available in the absence of a hospital. He restored the neglected spring, built a new bathhouse, and attracted new patients. In 1729 he published an article on the treatment of leprosy with spring water; a full chemical analysis of the water was completed in 1741.

=== Anatomical teaching ===
Spöring organised the fourth public anatomical dissection at the academy in 1730. Because public opinion was still hostile to dissection, he published a printed programme defending its legitimacy and usefulness. On his initiative the academy took over the so-called Old School building in 1738 and established a dissection room there. A dedicated anatomy building was not decided upon until 1748, after his death.

=== Variolation ===
During his time in central Europe in the 1720s Spöring had encountered variolation, then recently introduced as a method of protection against smallpox. In 1737 he published Inoculatio variolarum, also titled Kort beskrifning om sättet at ympa koppor på menniskior ("A short description of the method of inoculating smallpox in people"), making him the first in the Nordic countries to describe variolation in print. The first actual inoculation in Finland was not carried out until 1754.

=== Parasitology ===
In 1747 Spöring described a case in which a woman had passed a fragment of a tapeworm through an abscess in her groin. He proposed that tapeworms lived in water, that their eggs entered the human body through drinking water and the consumption of raw or undercooked fish, and that the disease was therefore more common among people living near rivers, streams, and lakes — observations he supported with reference to higher rates of infection in Ostrobothnia, Turku and Pori, and Kymmenedalen. Nils Rosén von Rosenstein in Sweden regarded these findings as worthy of further investigation.

In 1743 he published an article on the childhood condition known as borst, identifying it as blocked sebaceous glands (comedones) rather than true worms, as had been claimed by Michael Ettmüller and others.

== Natural history and mineralogy ==
Spöring also pursued natural history, particularly mineralogy. During his student years he assembled a substantial mineral collection, which the academy purchased after his death. With the help of his students he gathered thirty ore and mineral samples that in 1736 became the foundation of the academy's mineral cabinet. He also secured a royal ordinance requiring the mining colleges to transfer duplicate mineral specimens to the academy.

One of his students was the naturalist Pehr Kalm.

== Teaching and publications ==
Because the number of students under his supervision was small, Spöring supervised relatively few dissertations. In 1733, in the absence of suitable textbooks, he published a pamphlet entitled Medicina Salernitana containing hygienic precepts derived from the medieval School of Salerno. Under his supervision Johan Ekelund defended a master's thesis in 1741 on the waters at Kuppis, and in 1742 Ekelund became the first physician to graduate from the academy in its hundred-year history.

== Learned societies ==
On account of observations he had submitted to the Royal Society of Sciences in Uppsala and the Royal Swedish Academy of Sciences, Spöring was elected a member of the former in 1730 and of the latter in 1742. During a stay in Stockholm in January 1743 he delivered the first memorial address ever given before the Academy of Sciences, honouring Johan Moraeus, the father-in-law of Carl Linnaeus. After Spöring's death, Abraham Bäck delivered a memorial address in his honour on 11 January 1749.

== Personal life and character ==
In 1732 Spöring married Hedvig Ulrika Meurman. He was of medium height, with masculine and pleasant features and curly hair. According to Bäck, he was an excellent physician, as evidenced by his wide reputation and the confidence his patients placed in him, and he was noted everywhere for the great compassion he showed them. He died in Turku on 17 June 1747 after a prolonged illness.

== Legacy ==
His son Herman Diedrich Spöring Jr. participated in James Cook's first voyage and died in the Indian Ocean. The drawing skills the elder Spöring had cultivated in his youth were later put to use in illustrated accounts of German mining operations, a copy of which he donated to the academy.
