= Mangatokerau River =

- Route of the Mangatokerau River
- Mouth of the Mangatokerau River Mangatokerau River (North Island)

Location
- Country: New Zealand
- Island: North Island
- Region: Gisborne

Physical characteristics
- Source: Confluence of Kaimonona Stream and Takamapohia Stream
  - coordinates: 38°16′11″S 178°11′10″E
- Mouth: Ūawa River
  - coordinates: 38°18′11″S 178°15′25″E

Basin features
- Progression: Mangatokerau River → Ūawa River → Tolaga Bay → Pacific Ocean
- River system: Ūawa River
- Tributaries
  - left: Tohitu Stream, Mangaonui Stream
  - right: Te Kokokakahi Stream, Mākawakawa Stream, Mangakino Stream
- Bridges: Mangatokerau Bridge

The Mangatokerau River is a river of the Gisborne District of New Zealand's North Island. It flows generally southeast to meet the Ūawa River, which it joins 7 kilometres (4 mi) from the latter's Tolaga Bay mouth.

== See also ==
- List of rivers of New Zealand
