= Herman Spöring Jr. =

18th-century Finland-Swedish explorer, botanist and draftsman

- Born: 1733; Turku (Åbo in Swedish), Finland
- Died: January 1771 (aged 37–38); At sea
- Education: Academy of Åbo
- Known for: Discovery and illustration of Australian species
- Scientific career
- Fields: Explorer, draughtsman, botanist, naturalist

Herman Diedrich Spöring Jr. (1733–1771) was a Finnish explorer, draughtsman, botanist and a naturalist.

== Early life ==
Herman Spöring Jr. was born in 1733 in the town of Åbo Turku, at that time a major Finnish city and administrative center of the Swedish Empire. He was the son of an amateur naturalist and professor of Medicine at the Academy of Åbo, Herman Spöring Sr. (1701–1747), in Åbo/Turku, Finland. Spöring Jr. attended the Academy as a youth, studying medicine under his father. Sometime around 1755, at his age of 22, he moved to London, where he began working at a watchmakers. During this time, he became acquainted with the Swedish naturalist Daniel Solander, who employed him as his personal clerk for a time.

In 1768, Spöring Jr. was enlisted as a clerk, assistant naturalist and personal secretary in the entourage of Joseph Banks, a wealthy young botanist who was preparing for an expedition to the Pacific Ocean, sponsored by the British Royal Society. This expedition had as one of its principal goals the observation of the transit of Venus. However, it was also intended to make scientific studies of the flora and fauna of any new lands encountered on the way of the voyage. Indeed, the confidential purpose of the voyage - from the point of view of the British Admiralty, in particular - was to seek out the hypothetical "unknown southern continent", orTerra Australis (Incognita).

The other noted naturalist on the voyage was Daniel Solander, Spöring's former employer who had recommended Spöring for the post when he himself signed up. Solander was a former student and protégé of the noted Swedish botanist and founder of modern taxonomy, Carl Linnaeus. Spöring was also a skilled instrument and clock maker, and in addition to his cataloging duties was assigned the maintenance and upkeep of the ship's scientific equipment during the voyage.

== Voyage to the Pacific ==
The expedition left England in 1768, aboard HM Bark Endeavour under the command of R.N. Lt. James Cook, bound for the Society Islands (present-day Tahiti). They arrived there in 1769, where the observations of Venus were taken during the transit on 3 June. Spöring had to repair the astronomical quadrant after it had become damaged when it was taken by the local Polynesian inhabitants.

Leaving the Society Islands, the expedition sailed southwards, reaching New Zealand where Spöring Jr. and the other naturalists became the first ever European to have landed there. The ensuing months were spent gathering and documenting specimens of native plant and animal life there. At a bay now known as Tolaga Bay (not far from the modern township of Gisborne), Cook bestowed the name Spöring Island to a landmark, after the botanist. Today, the island is best known by its original Māori name, Pourewa.

The expedition continued westwards, and in 1770 the Endeavour encountered the southeastern coastline of the Australian continent, and became the first European vessel to have navigated the eastern side of the continent. The expedition made first landfall at a site Cook named Botany Bay, very near the site at which 18 years later the colony of Sydney would be established. Banks, Solander and Spöring collected further unique specimens from this site. This collection would be greatly augmented later when the Endeavour was laid up for several weeks for repairs, after having run aground on a section of the Great Barrier Reef much further to the north. The naturalists availed themselves of the opportunity whilst repairs were being made to continue their compilation of new species.

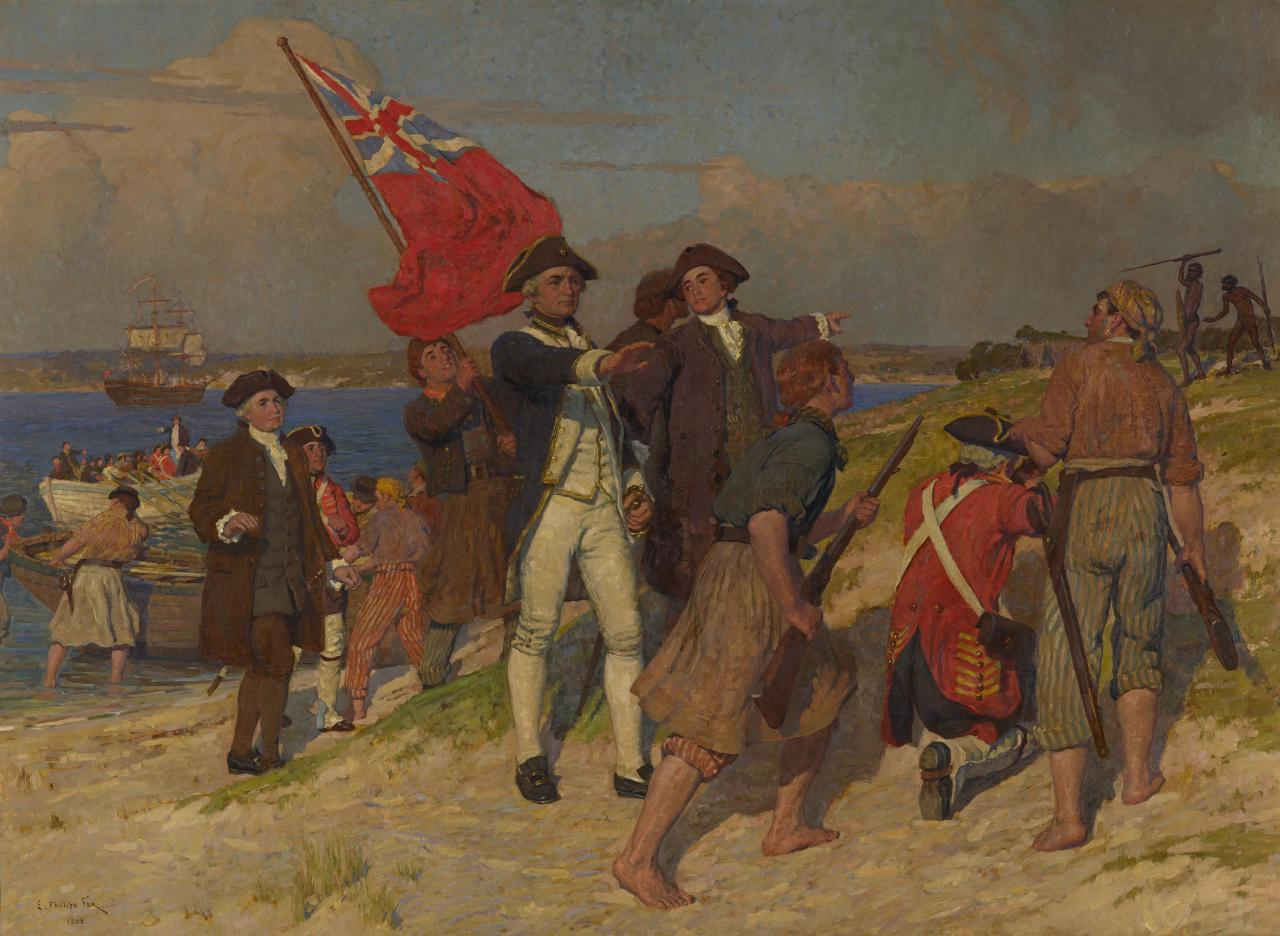
Landing of Captain Cook at Botany Bay, 1770, by E. Phillips Fox

The first meeting between the Aboriginal people and the British explorers occurred on 29 April 1770 when Lieutenant James Cook landed at Botany Bay (Kamay) and encountered the Gweagal clan. Two Gweagal men opposed the landing party and in the confrontation one of them was shot and wounded.

At some point in his life, Spöring Jr. created an art piece featuring the now rare Heva Tūpāpāʻu funeral costume from Tahiti, of which very few examples still exist.

Once the repairs were completed, the expedition continued northwards to the East Indies port of Batavia (Jakarta). Until this point in the voyage, no crewmember or passenger had been lost to disease; however, the unhealthy conditions of the port and their new provisions would soon result in quite a few deaths, including that of Spöring himself. In 1771 on the return leg, Spöring died of dysentery complications related to food poisoning. He was buried at sea on 24 January 1771.

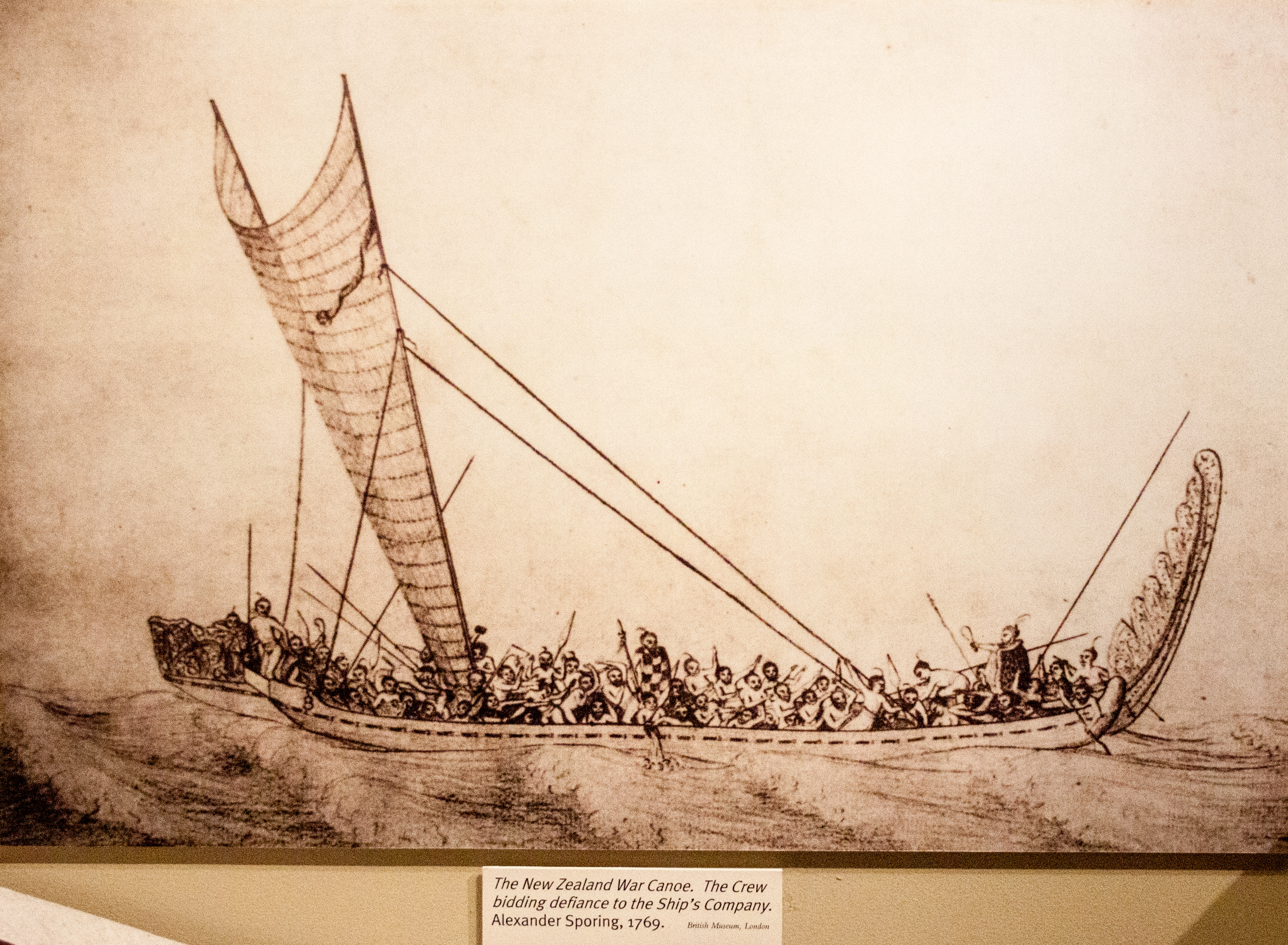
Drawing by Spöring

== Achievements and commemorations ==
He has a commemorative statue dedicated to him in Sydney, Australia.

In 1990, a rock taken from Pourewa (Spöring) Island was transported to Spöring's birthplace of Åbo, Finland, to be placed in a monument set up to commemorate his achievements and ties with New Zealand, as the first Finn to have landed there.

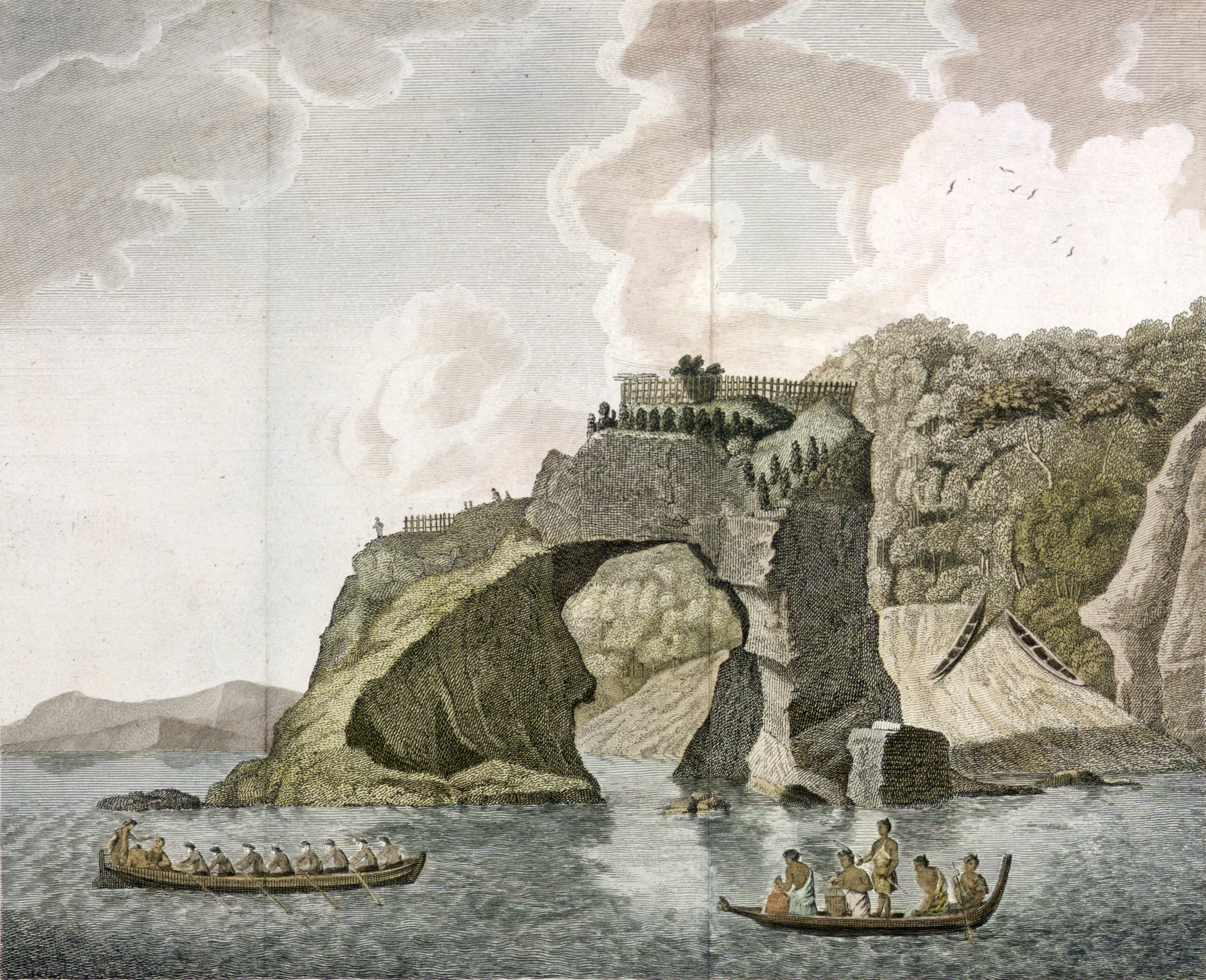
Engraving of Spöring's Arch (1769)

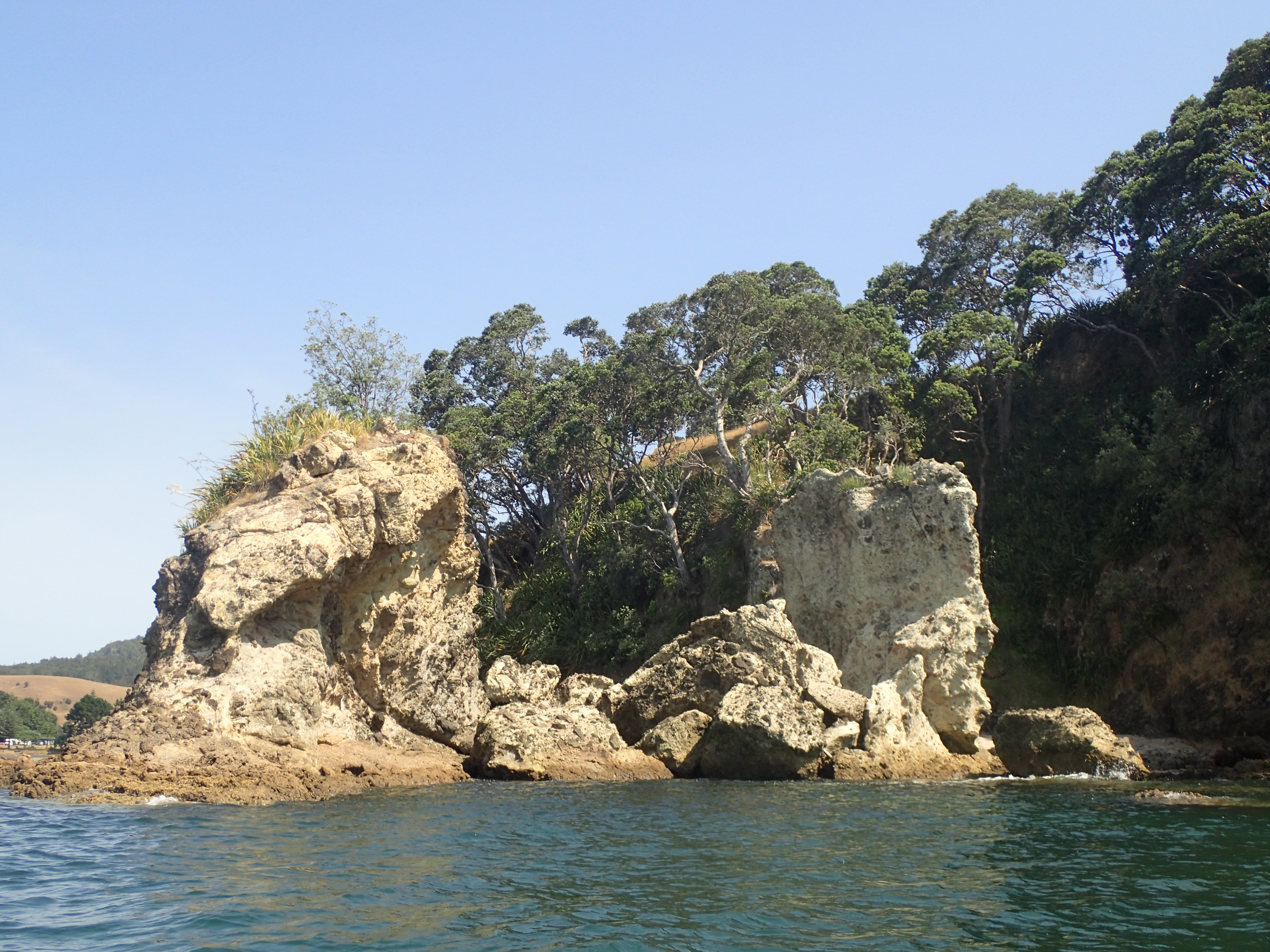
Spörings Arch / Te Puta-O-Paretauhinu (or what remains in 2020) Simpsons Beach / Wharekaho New Zealand / Aotearoa

Amongst his achievements are the discovery and illustration of a number of hitherto-unknown Australian species. His colleagues and successors who studied his materials have recognised the accuracy and form of his drawings and annotations. His efforts, along with those of others on the voyage provided critical new materials for study, which allowed further advances in the historical development of the theory of evolution to be made.
