= Nōpera Te Rangiuia =

Māori tohunga (1835–1850)

Nōpera Te Rangiuia (fl. 1835–1850) was a New Zealand Māori tohunga of the Ngāti Porou iwi (tribe). He lived at Tolaga Bay.
