= Ūawa River =

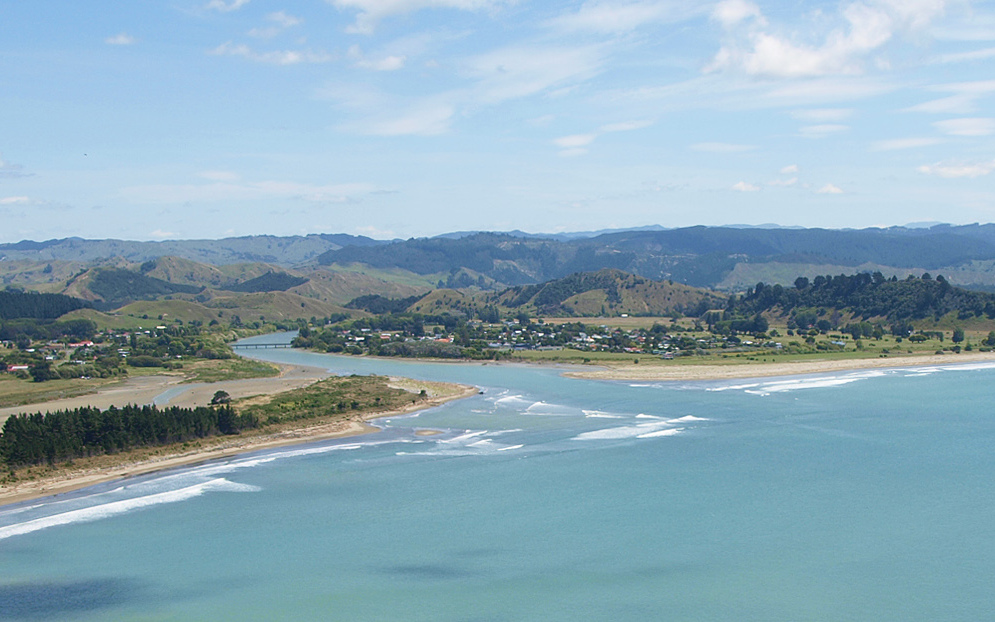
- The Ūawa River mouth at Tolaga Bay
- Route of the Ūawa River
- Mouth of the Ūawa River Ūawa River (North Island)
- Native name: Ūawa-nui-a-Ruamatua (Māori)

Location
- Country: New Zealand
- Island: North Island
- Region: Gisborne

Physical characteristics
- Source: confluence of Mangatokerau River and Hikuwai River
  - location: Mangatuna
  - coordinates: 38.3744°S 178.3065°E
- Mouth: Tolaga Bay
  - location: Tolaga Bay
  - coordinates: 38°22′28″S 178°18′23″E
  - elevation: 0 m (0 ft)
- Basin size: 539 km^{2} (208 sq mi)
- Discharge
  - average: 15 m^{3}/s (530 cu ft/s)

Basin features
- Progression: Ūawa River → Tolaga Bay → Pacific Ocean
- River system: Ūawa River System
- Tributaries
  - left: Mangahoui Stream, Mangaopeka Stream, Ihunui Stream
  - right: Tapuae Stream, Mangaheia River, Waimaunu Stream
- Bridges: Ūawa River Bridge

The Ūawa River is a river in the Gisborne District of New Zealand. The river drains an area of consisting predominantly of managed forestry land northwest of Tolaga Bay. The river flows out into the Pacific at Tolaga Bay. The river is prone to flooding and has had significant issues with forestry slash.

== Geography ==
The Ūawa River begins at the confluence of the Mangatokerau and Hikuwai rivers. The river and meanders south for about 10 kilometres (6 mi) passing the settlement of Wharekaka before flowing into the sea at Tolaga Bay. Much of the catchment area of the Ūawa River is land formed during the Pleistocene.

The larger Ūawa River System includes the Hikuwai River and Waiau River, and drains a total catchment area of 539 km^{2} (208 sq mi). The ultimate source of the river is at the head of the Pangopango Stream near Tauwharepārae. The stream initially flows north and where it is joined by Ngapunarua Stream it becomes the Waiau River. The river meanders in a northerly direction through large areas of managed forestry before bending eastwards towards the settlement of Hikuwai. The Hikuwai River begins at the confluence of the Waiau River and Mangarākai Stream. The rivers flow south through this section, meandering through an area of farmland and the settlements of Arero and Mangatuna. State highway 2 follows the river valley through this section crossing the river four times.

== Biodiversity ==
The river mouth area is a wetland dominated by Typha orientalis.

== Flooding ==
Flooding in the Ūawa River System is frequent, especially in the Mangaheia River valley. The area is prone to high rain falls when easterly weather systems make landfall from the Pacific Ocean. During Cyclone Gabrielle the monitoring river level at Willow Flat rose from an average 2 m (6 ft 7 in) height to a height of over 14 m (46 ft).

== Gallery ==
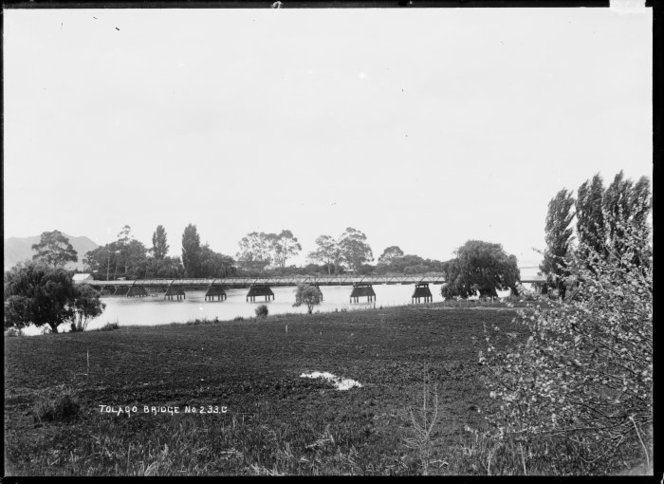
Image of a bridge over the Ūawa River, circa 1915

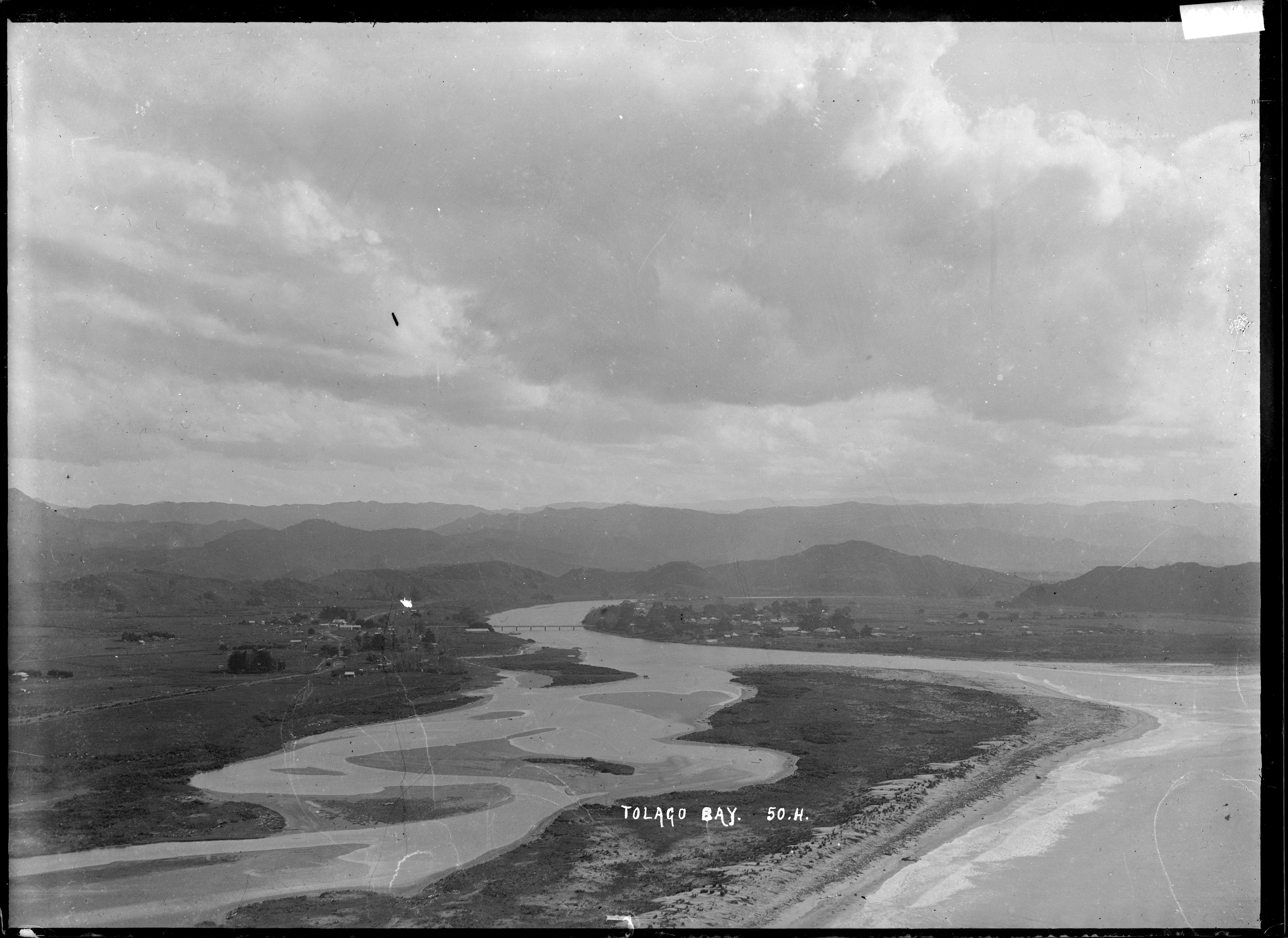
River mouth in the early 20th century

== See also ==
- List of rivers of New Zealand
