= Te Aitanga-a-Hauiti =

Māori iwi of the East Coast of New Zealand

- Iwi (tribe) in Māoridom
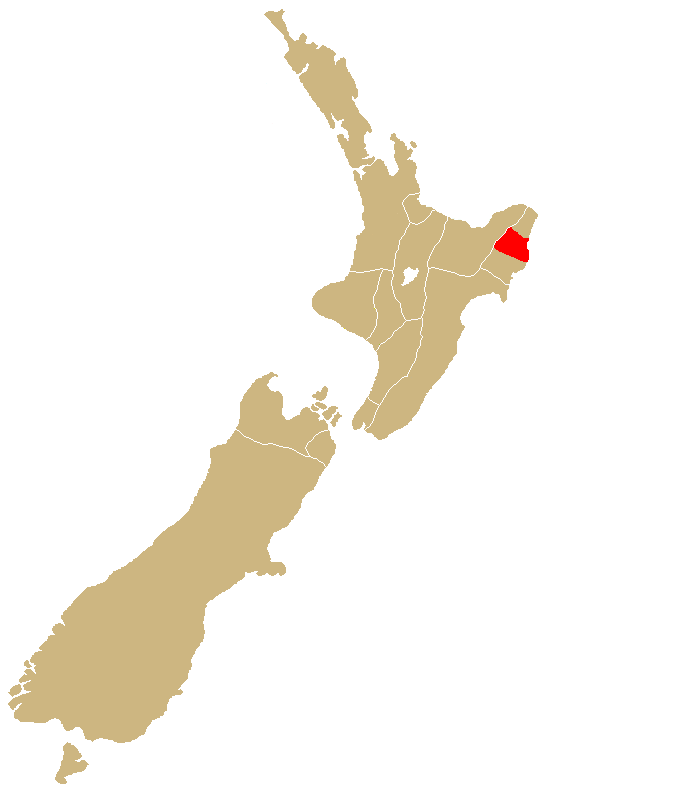
- Rohe (region): East Coast of the North Island
- Waka (canoe): Tereanini, Horouta, Tākitimu

Te Aitanga-a-Hauiti is a Māori iwi centred on Ūawa (Tolaga Bay) on the East Coast of New Zealand's North Island. The iwi traces its descent from the eponymous ancestor Hauiti and traditionally occupies the district between Te Mawhai, near Tokomaru Bay, and Tūranga-nui-a-Kiwa (Gisborne).

Te Aitanga-a-Hauiti traces its origins to the sixteenth-century rangatira Hauiti, whose descendants established authority over the Ūawa district. The iwi is particularly associated with the renowned whare wānanga Te Rawheoro, the eighteenth-century ariki Hinematioro, and the nineteenth-century leader Te Kani-a-Takirau, one of the most influential rangatira of the East Coast.

== History ==
=== Origins ===
According to Te Aitanga-a-Hauiti tradition, Hauiti was the youngest son of Hīngāngāroa and Iranui. Hīngāngāroa was renowned as a master carver and builder and is credited with founding Te Rawheoro, a celebrated whare wānanga at Mangakuku near Ūawa. The school became an important centre for the teaching of whakapapa, tribal history, carving and other traditional arts, attracting students from throughout the East Coast.

Traditions recount that Hauiti established his authority over the Ūawa district following a series of conflicts with his elder brothers, Taua-i-te-rangi and Māhaki-ewe-karoro. Under the leadership of Hauiti and later his eldest son Kahukuranui, the descendants of Hauiti became established as the principal tribal community of the district and became known collectively as Te Aitanga-a-Hauiti ("the descendants of Hauiti").

The traditions surrounding Hauiti describe the emergence of Te Aitanga-a-Hauiti as a distinct tribal community centred on Ūawa. They also attribute the consolidation of the iwi's authority to the leadership of Kahukuranui, who succeeded Hauiti and extended his influence throughout the district.

=== Te Rawheoro ===
Te Rawheoro was a renowned whare wānanga at Mangakuku near Ūawa and one of the principal centres of Māori learning on the East Coast. It was associated with the teaching of whakapapa, tribal history, carving, cosmology and other traditional knowledge, and attracted students from throughout the region.

According to Te Aitanga-a-Hauiti tradition, Te Rawheoro played an important role in the transmission of knowledge and artistic traditions between Te Aitanga-a-Hauiti and neighbouring iwi, contributing to the development of the distinctive East Coast carving tradition.

=== European contact ===
When Lieutenant James Cook arrived at Ūawa in October 1769, Te Aitanga-a-Hauiti occupied a densely settled district centred on the Ūawa and Mangaheia river valleys. Unlike Cook's earlier landing at Tūranga-nui-a-Kiwa, the encounter at Ūawa was largely peaceful and included exchanges between local rangatira, Cook and the Tahitian navigator Tupaia.

During the eighteenth century, the district was dominated by the senior chiefly lines of Hinematioro and Whakatātare-o-te-rangi, whose influence extended across much of the East Coast.

=== Te Kani-a-Takirau ===
The most prominent ariki of Te Aitanga-a-Hauiti was Te Kani-a-Takirau, whose authority derived from the convergence of the senior chiefly lines descending from Hinematioro and Whakatātare-o-te-rangi. During the early nineteenth century he became one of the most influential rangatira on the East Coast and exercised authority throughout the Ūawa district.

According to tribal tradition, Te Kani-a-Takirau declined an invitation to become the first Māori King, replying:

Ehara taku maunga a Hikurangi i te maunga nekeneke.

("My mountain Hikurangi is not a mountain that moves.")

Te Kani-a-Takirau remains one of the most celebrated leaders in the history of Te Aitanga-a-Hauiti and the wider East Coast.

== Rohe ==
The traditional rohe of Te Aitanga-a-Hauiti extends along the East Coast from Te Mawhai, near Tokomaru Bay, to Tūranga-nui-a-Kiwa (Gisborne), and is centred on the Ūawa and Mangaheia river systems.

The southern extent of the rohe has historically overlapped with the customary interests of neighbouring iwi and hapū. In its submission on the Ngā Rohe Moana o Ngā Hapū o Ngāti Porou Bill, the Rongowhakaata Iwi Trust described Te Aitanga-a-Hauiti as a distinct iwi with longstanding whakapapa ties to Rongowhakaata and recognised customary interests between the Pouawa River and Te Toka-a-Taiau, while rejecting its classification as a hapū of Ngāti Porou.

== Repatriation of Te Pou o Hinematioro ==
In March 2026, the University of Tübingen formally transferred the kaitiakitanga of Te Pou o Hinematioro to Te Aitanga-a-Hauiti following more than two decades of collaboration between the iwi and the university. The carved pou, which left Ūawa aboard James Cook's Endeavour in 1769 and had subsequently been held in Germany, returned permanently to Ūawa after 256 years overseas.

The return followed earlier cultural exchanges between Te Aitanga-a-Hauiti and the University of Tübingen, including the pou's temporary return to Ūawa in 2019 and a jointly curated exhibition in Germany before its permanent repatriation. Since July 2026, the pou has been the focus of the exhibition Te Pou o Hinematioro – He Ihu tō mai nō te Pō at Tairāwhiti Museum.

== Notable people ==
Notable members of the tribe include:

- Parekura Horomia – politician
- Robyn Kahukiwa – artist
- Harry Ngata – association footballer
- Tūtekohi Rangi (died 1956) – tohunga and faith healer
- Waimarama Taumaunu – netballer
- John Walsh – artist

== See also ==
- Te Kani-a-Takirau
- Te Rawheoro
- Hinematioro
