= Mangaheia River =

- Route of the Mangaheia River
- Mouth of the Mangaheia River Mangaheia River (North Island)
- Native name: Mangaheia (Māori)

Location
- Country: New Zealand
- Island: North Island
- Region: Gisborne

Physical characteristics
- Source: Confluence of Waikairo Stream and Ramanui Stream
  - coordinates: 38.3266°S 178.16120°E
- Mouth: Ūawa River
  - coordinates: 38°21′39″S 178°17′16″E
- Length: 41 km (25 mi)

Basin features
- Progression: Mangaheia River → Ūawa River → Tolaga Bay → Pacific Ocean
- River system: Ūawa River
- Tributaries
  - left: Mangateao Stream, Mangatoitoi Stream, Waipurupuru Stream
  - right: Takapau Stream, Kōwhai Stream, Tariana Stream, Pātiki Stream
- Bridges: Wigan Bridge, Mangaheia No. 1, Bridge, Mangaheia Bridge No. 2, Mangaheia Bridge No. 3, Mangaheia Bridge No. 4

The Mangaheia River is a river of the Gisborne Region of New Zealand's North Island. It flows southeast from its origins in rough hill country inland from Tolaga Bay, joining with the Ūawa River close to its outflow into Tolaga Bay. The river catchment is predominately managed forestry land northwest of Tolaga Bay and there have been significant issues with forestry slash during periods of flood.

== See also ==
- List of rivers of New Zealand
