= Pourewa Island =

Island in New Zealand

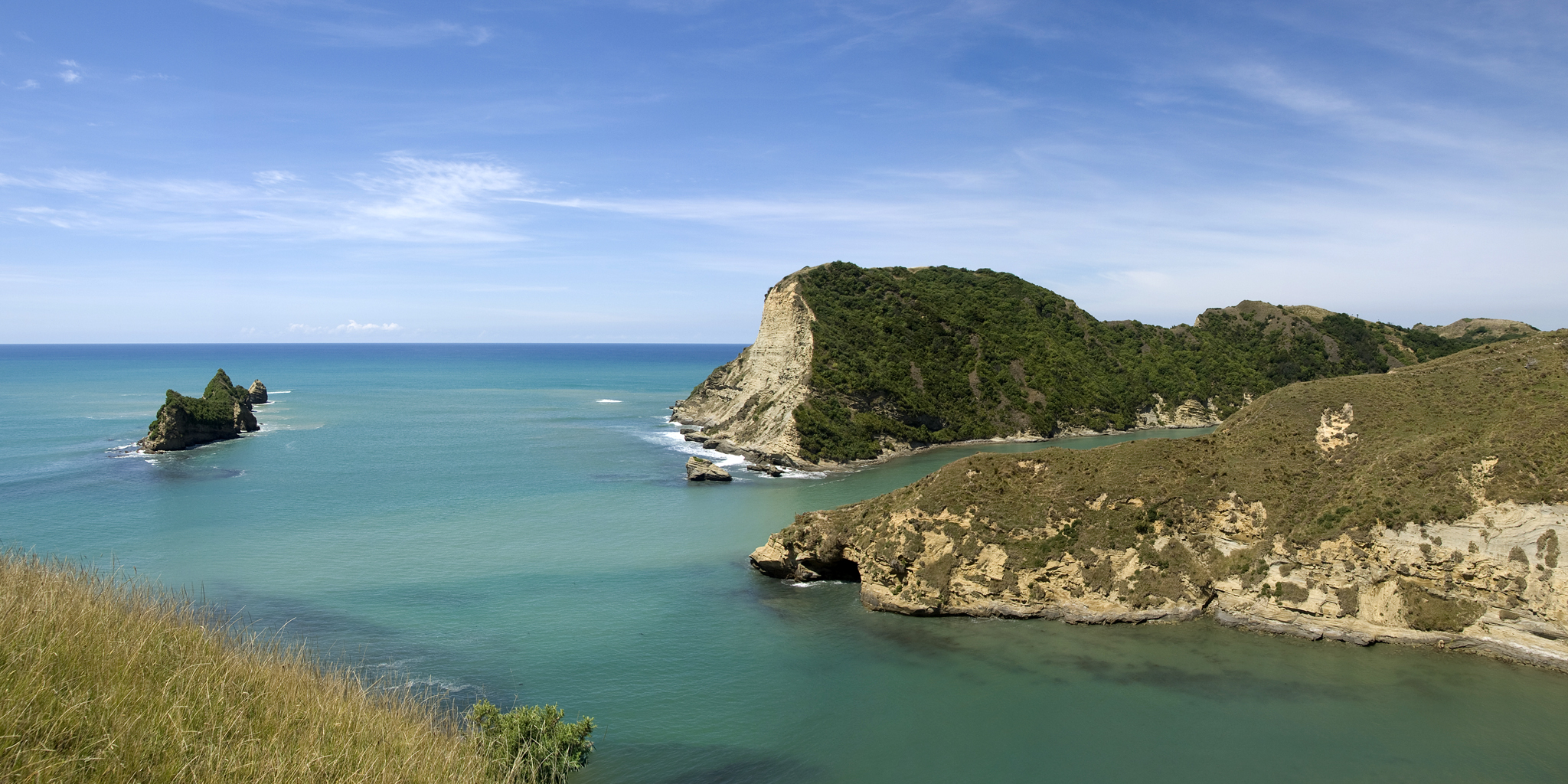
- Pourewa Island by the right with Mitre Rocks by the left and cook's cove in the foreground

Geography
- Location: Gisborne Region
- Coordinates: 38°23′S 178°21′E

Administration
- New Zealand

Pourewa Island lies in Tolaga Bay, just offshore from Cook's Cove in New Zealand.

It was formerly known as Spöring Island, named by Lt. James Cook after the Finnish draughtsman Herman Spöring, a member of the scientific detachment aboard HM Bark Endeavour, and in 1990 a rock was taken from Pourewa Island to Spöring's birthplace in Turku (Åbo), Finland, where it forms part of a monument which was erected there to commemorate the first Finn to land in New Zealand, in 1769.

It is also sometimes known as Loisel's Island, after Henri Loisel who took up a sheep farm at Waihau Bay to the south, and is said to have kept a yacht moored there, but is again officially known by its original Māori name, Pourewa.

== See also ==
- List of islands of New Zealand
- List of islands
- Desert island
