= Tūtekohi Rangi =

New Zealand Māori tohunga and faith healer

Tūtekohi Rangi (1871–1956) was a New Zealand Māori tohunga and faith healer. He identified with the Te Aitanga-a-Hauiti iwi. He was born in Mangatuna, East Coast, New Zealand, in about 1871. He held religious meetings at various places in the Wairoa district of Hawke's Bay and in Tikitiki. He died at his home in Wairoa on 21 February 1956.
