= Te Kani-a-Takirau =

- Born: c. 1790; East Coast, New Zealand
- Died: 1856 (aged approximately 66); Tolaga Bay, New Zealand
- Resting place: Whangara or Whangara Island (disputed); 38°34′7″S 178°13′48″E or 38°34′23″S 178°14′10″E (approximate locations)
- Occupation: Rangatira (chief)
- Organization: Te Aitanga-a-Hauiti of Ngāti Porou
- Spouse: Wikitoria TeAmotawa

Te Kani-a-Takirau (c. 1790s – c. 1856) was a notable New Zealand tribal leader. Of Māori descent, he identified with Hapu Matua of the Te Aitanga A Hauiti Iwi. He was born in on the East Coast of New Zealand. He is well known for having refused to sign the Treaty of Waitangi in 1840.

In 1827 he met Captain Dumont d'Urville of the Astrolabe, and visited his ship.
