= Waiau River (Gisborne) =

River in New Zealand

- Route of the Waiau River
- Mouth of the Waiau River Waiau River (Gisborne) (North Island)

Location
- Country: New Zealand
- Island: North Island
- Region: Gisborne

Physical characteristics
- Source: Confluence of Pangopango Stream and Ngapunarua Stream
  - coordinates: 38.22497°S 178.09632°E
- Mouth: Hikuwai River
  - coordinates: 38°09′27″S 178°15′00″E

Basin features
- Progression: Waiau River → Hikuwai River → Ūawa River → Pacific Ocean
- Tributaries
  - left: Mangaehu Stream, Anauraiti Stream, Makomako Stream

Waiau River is a river in the Gisborne Region of New Zealand. It has its headwaters in the same area of hill country to the east of the Raukumara Range as the Mata River, flowing firstly north, then east to become a tributary of the Hikuwai River.

== See also ==
- List of rivers of New Zealand
