= Tolaga Bay =

Town in Gisborne District, New Zealand

Tolaga Bay Ūawa (Māori)
- Town
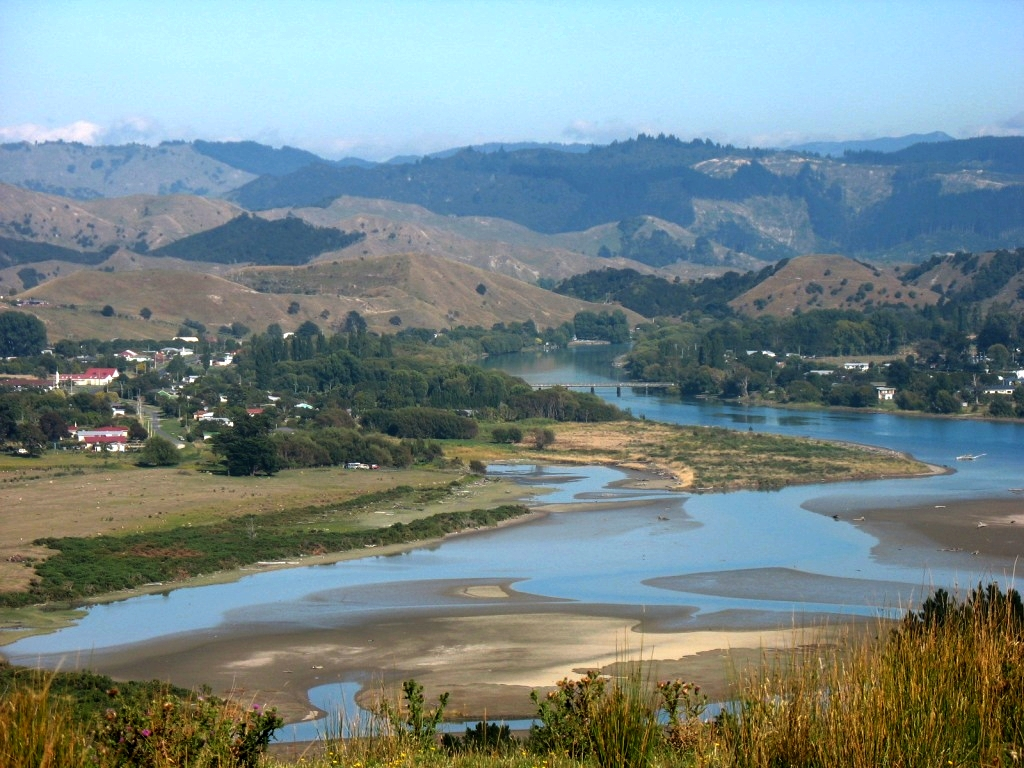
- Tolaga Bay
- Interactive map of Tolaga Bay
- Coordinates: 38°22′S 178°18′E
- Country: New Zealand
- Region: Gisborne District
- Ward: Tairāwhiti General Ward
- Electorates: East Cape; Ikaroa-Rāwhiti (Māori)

Government
  - Territorial authority: Gisborne District Council
  - Mayor of Gisborne: Rehette Stoltz
  - East Cape MP: Dana Kirkpatrick
  - Ikaroa-Rāwhiti MP: Cushla Tangaere-Manuel

Area
  - Total: 7.54 km^{2} (2.91 sq mi)

Population (June 2025)
  - Total: 980
  - Density: 130/km^{2} (340/sq mi)
- Time zone: UTC+12 (NZST)
  - Summer (DST): UTC+13 (NZDT)
- Postcode: 4077
- Area code: 06

Tolaga Bay (Māori: Ūawa) is both a bay and small town on the East Coast of New Zealand's North Island located 45 kilometres northeast of Gisborne and 30 kilometres south of Tokomaru Bay.

The region around the bay is rugged and remote, and for many years the only access to the town was by boat. Because the bay is shallow, a long wharf – the second longest in New Zealand (600m) after the Tiwai Point wharf at Bluff (1,500m) – was built in the 1920s to accommodate visiting vessels. The last cargo ship to use the wharf loaded a cargo of maize in 1967.

The town is a popular holiday spot. Its population is predominantly Māori, a centre of the Te Aitanga-a-Hauiti hapū and home of chief Te Kani-a-Takirau (died c. 1856) and tohunga Te Rangiuia (died 1850).

== Geography ==
The Ūawa River reaches the Pacific Ocean in the middle of Tolaga Bay. There is a bar at the river mouth with around 2 metres of water at high tide. The Ūawa River is called the Hikuwai further up. Tributaries include the Waiau and the Mangaheia. In 2018 heavy rains washed huge amounts of discarded forestry timber (or slash) down the Ūawa River, which choked up the estuary, covered the beach, and caused extensive damage to farms and houses.

An island in the bay was originally named Spöring Island by Cook, after his expedition's assistant naturalist and instrument maker, Herman Spöring, a Finnish botanist. It is however today again known by its Māori name, Pourewa.

The bay has an arched rock, sometimes known as Spörings Arch, which was illustrated by Herman Spöring Jr. in James Cook's voyage in October 1769.

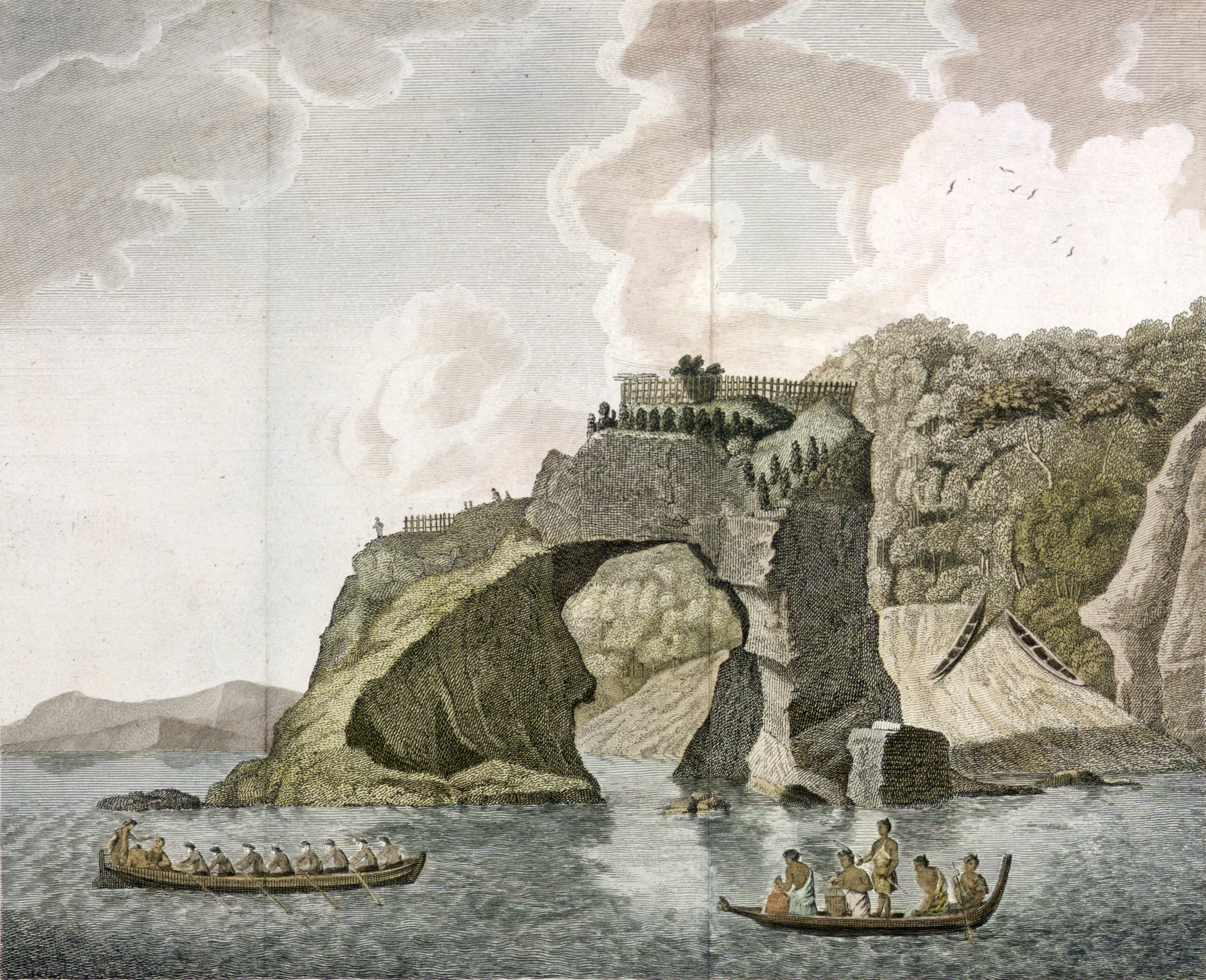
Engraving of Spöring's Arch (1769)

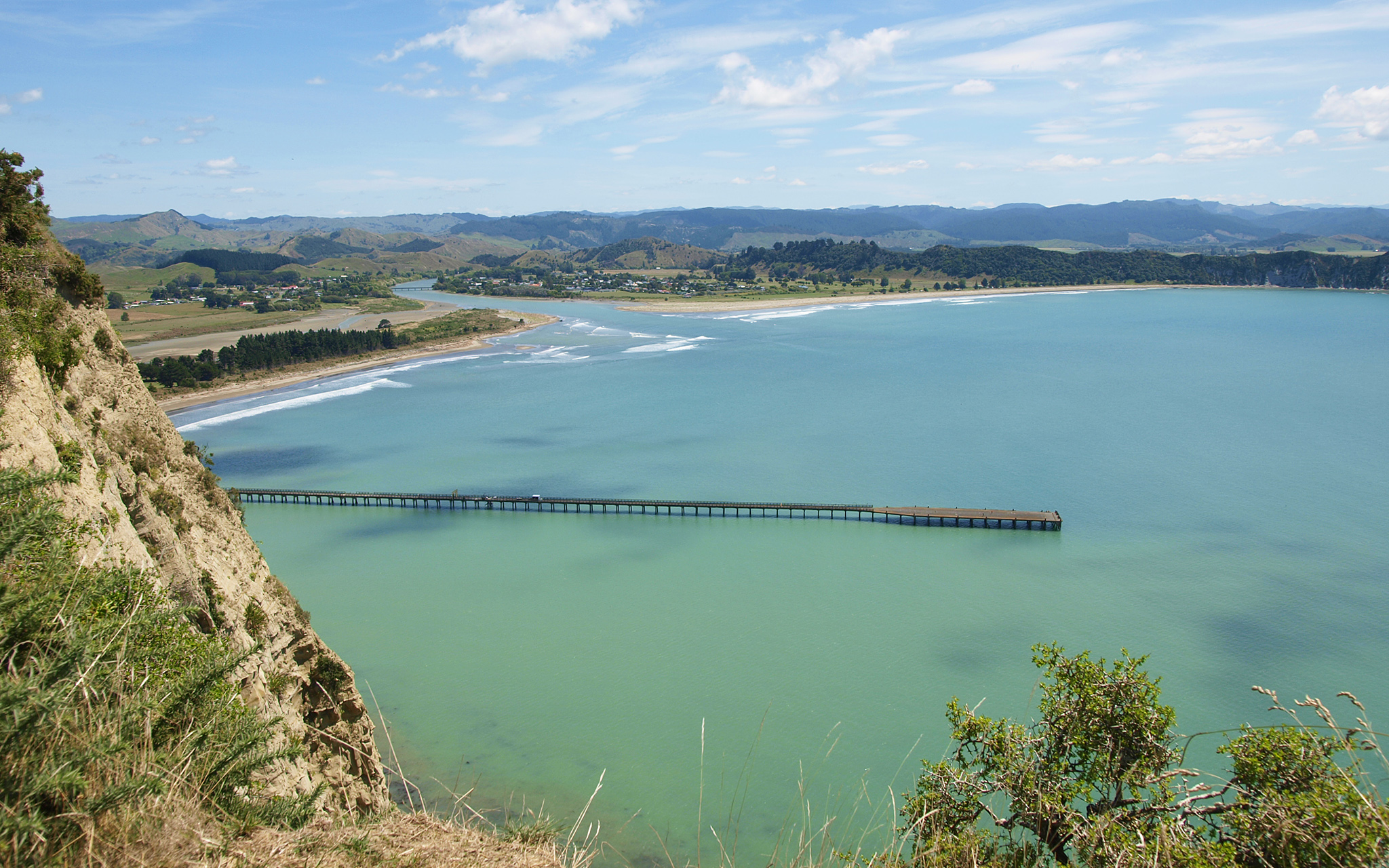
Tolaga Bay with Ūawa River

=== Parks ===
Uawa Reserve is the settlement's local sports ground.

== Demographics ==
Stats NZ describes Tolaga Bay as a rural settlement, which covers 7.54 km^{2} (2.91 sq mi). It had an estimated population of 980 as of June 2025, with a population density of 130 people per km^{2}. It is part of the larger Wharekaka statistical area.

Historical population for Tolaga Bay
Year	Pop.	±% p.a.
2006	810	—
2013	747	−1.15%
2018	831	+2.15%
2023	954	+2.80%

Tolaga Bay had a population of 954 in the 2023 New Zealand census, an increase of 123 people (14.8%) since the 2018 census, and an increase of 207 people (27.7%) since the 2013 census. There were 480 males, 474 females, and 3 people of other genders in 315 dwellings. 1.6% of people identified as LGBTIQ+. The median age was 34.3 years (compared with 38.1 years nationally). There were 225 people (23.6%) aged under 15 years, 195 (20.4%) aged 15 to 29, 375 (39.3%) aged 30 to 64, and 159 (16.7%) aged 65 or older.

People could identify as more than one ethnicity. The results were 28.0% European (Pākehā), 88.1% Māori, 4.7% Pasifika, and 1.3% Asian. English was spoken by 96.2%, Māori by 36.2%, Samoan by 0.6%, and other languages by 1.9%. No language could be spoken by 2.8% (e.g. too young to talk). The percentage of people born overseas was 3.5, compared with 28.8% nationally.

Religious affiliations were 30.8% Christian, 0.3% Islam, 6.6% Māori religious beliefs, 0.6% New Age, and 0.6% other religions. People who answered that they had no religion were 52.8%, and 9.4% of people did not answer the census question.

Of those at least 15 years old, 90 (12.3%) people had a bachelor's or higher degree, 417 (57.2%) had a post-high school certificate or diploma, and 228 (31.3%) people exclusively held high school qualifications. The median income was $28,800, compared with $41,500 nationally. 27 people (3.7%) earned over $100,000 compared to 12.1% nationally. The employment status of those at least 15 was 291 (39.9%) full-time, 96 (13.2%) part-time, and 45 (6.2%) unemployed.

=== Wharekaka statistical area ===
Wharekaka statistical area covers 1,197.18 km^{2} (462.23 sq mi) and had an estimated population of 2,050 as of June 2025, with a population density of 2 people per km^{2}.

Historical population for Wharekaka
Year	Pop.	±% p.a.
2006	1,914	—
2013	1,710	−1.60%
2018	1,812	+1.17%
2023	1,995	+1.94%

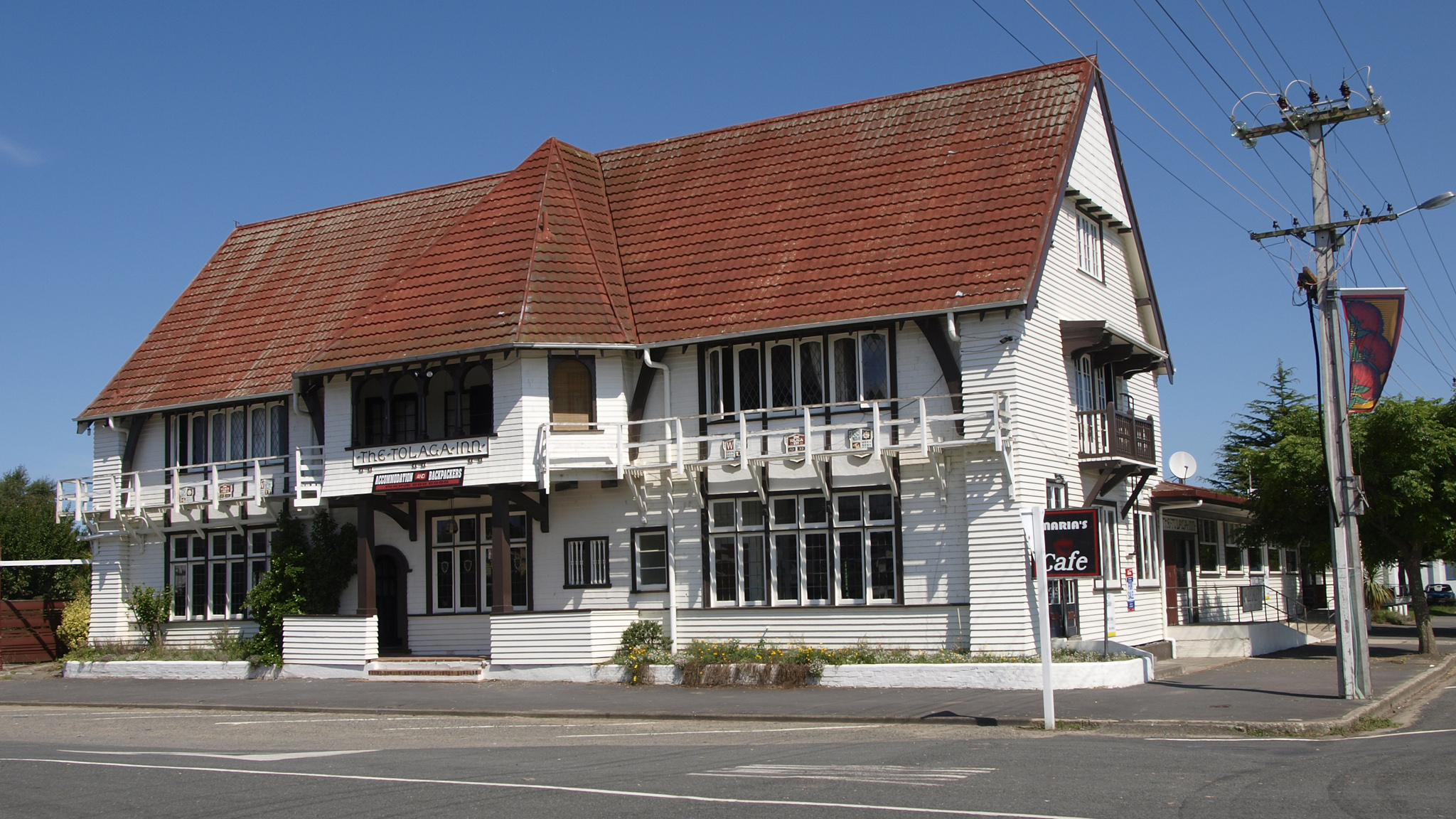
Tolaga Bay Inn, built in 1890

Wharekaka had a population of 1,995 in the 2023 New Zealand census, an increase of 183 people (10.1%) since the 2018 census, and an increase of 285 people (16.7%) since the 2013 census. There were 990 males, 1,005 females, and 3 people of other genders in 669 dwellings. 1.4% of people identified as LGBTIQ+. The median age was 36.2 years (compared with 38.1 years nationally). There were 468 people (23.5%) aged under 15 years, 369 (18.5%) aged 15 to 29, 843 (42.3%) aged 30 to 64, and 318 (15.9%) aged 65 or older.

People could identify as more than one ethnicity. The results were 49.9% European (Pākehā); 66.3% Māori; 4.5% Pasifika; 1.4% Asian; 0.3% Middle Eastern, Latin American and African New Zealanders (MELAA); and 1.8% other, which includes people giving their ethnicity as "New Zealander". English was spoken by 96.2%, Māori by 26.5%, Samoan by 0.3%, and other languages by 2.1%. No language could be spoken by 2.7% (e.g. too young to talk). New Zealand Sign Language was known by 0.3%. The percentage of people born overseas was 6.6, compared with 28.8% nationally.

Religious affiliations were 28.0% Christian, 0.2% Hindu, 0.2% Islam, 4.4% Māori religious beliefs, 0.2% Buddhist, 0.5% New Age, and 0.6% other religions. People who answered that they had no religion were 58.3%, and 8.3% of people did not answer the census question.

Of those at least 15 years old, 261 (17.1%) people had a bachelor's or higher degree, 870 (57.0%) had a post-high school certificate or diploma, and 390 (25.5%) people exclusively held high school qualifications. The median income was $35,000, compared with $41,500 nationally. 102 people (6.7%) earned over $100,000 compared to 12.1% nationally. The employment status of those at least 15 was 693 (45.4%) full-time, 246 (16.1%) part-time, and 66 (4.3%) unemployed.

== History ==
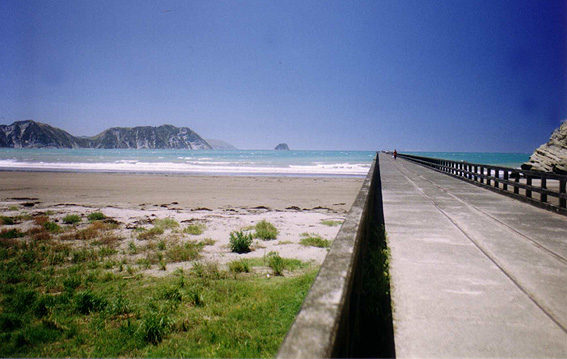
Tolaga Bay wharf – New Zealand's second longest wharf

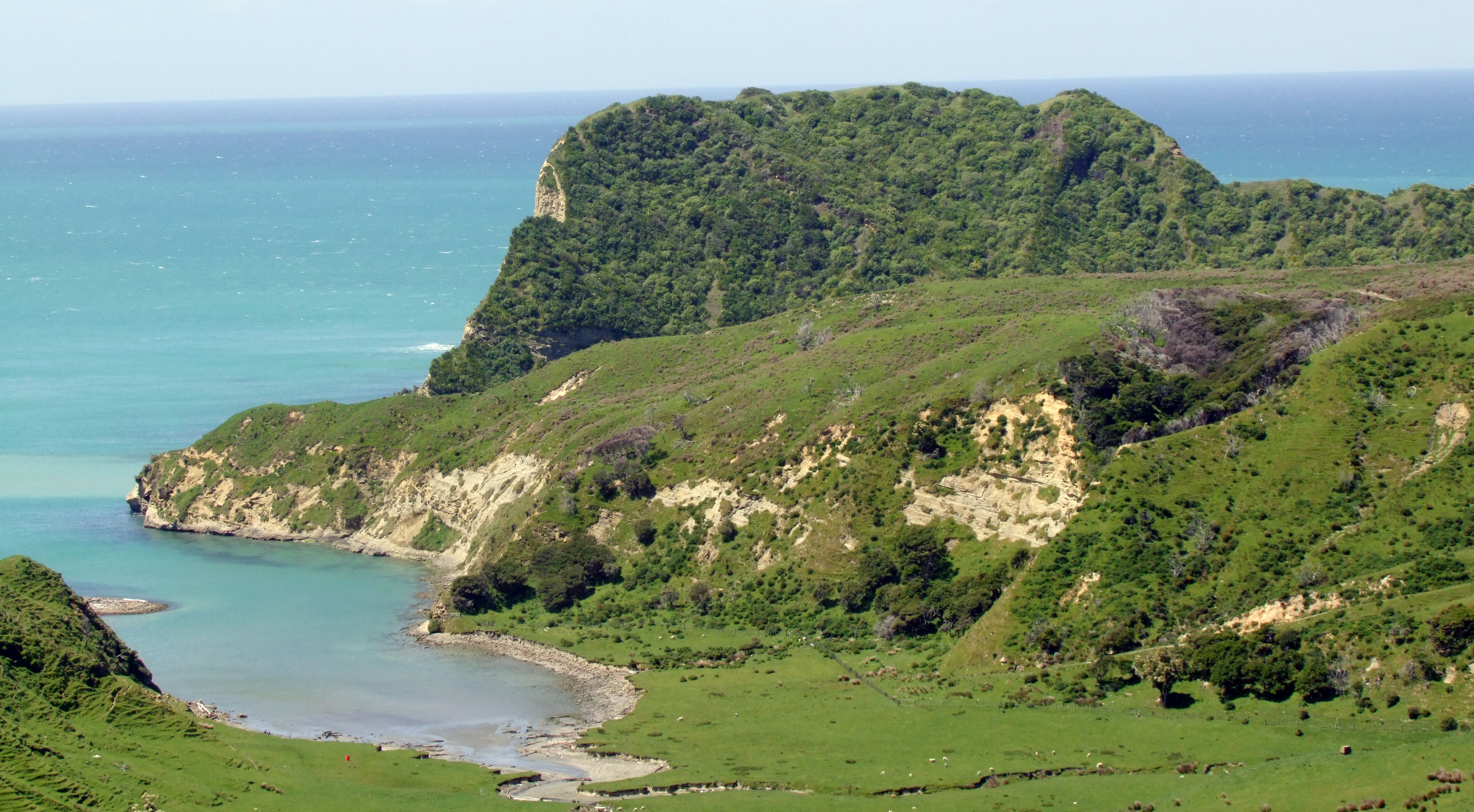
Cooks Cove, a small bay immediately south of Tolaga Bay

Tolaga Bay was named by Lt. James Cook in 1769. Described as "an obvious corruption of a Maori name", the exact derivation of the name is unclear. It may have been a misunderstanding of "teraki" or "tarakaka", referring to the local south-westerly wind rather than the place. The original Māori name is Uawa Nui A Ruamatua (shortened to Uawa), and some local residents now refer to the area as Hauiti, and themselves as Hauitians from the local hapū Te Aitanga-a-Hauiti.

At the time of Cook's visit, according to Anne Salmond, here "a famous school of learning (Known as Te Rawheoro) that specialised in tribal lore and carving was sited..." Tupaia, the Raiatean navigator accompanying Cook since Tahiti, met with the tohunga, priest, of this whare wananga. Tupaia exchanged news of the "Māori island homelands, known to Māori as 'Rangiatea' (Ra'iatea), 'Hawaiki' (Havai'i, the ancient name for Rai'iatea), and 'Tawhiti' (Tahiti)." The Māori viewed Tupaia as a tohunga, and many children born during his visit bore his name. Additionally, Tupaia made a sketch within the rock shelter of Opoutama ('Cook's Cove' or 'Tupaia's Cave'), according to Joel Polack.

In the 1830s there was a thriving flax trade involving early European traders like Barnet Burns. By 1998, the wharf had deteriorated and was in danger of being closed. In response, the Tolaga Bay Save the Wharf Trust raised funds and gained technical help to restore it. The wharf has now been re-opened and the refurbishment project finished in May 2013.

== Marae ==
Two marae are located south of the main township:

- Te Rawheoro Marae and Te Rawheoro meeting house is a meeting place of the Ngāti Porou hapū of Ngāti Patu Whare, Te Aitanga a Hauiti and Ngāti Wakarara.
- Hauiti Marae and Ruakapanga meeting house is a meeting place of the Ngāti Porou hapū of Ngāi Tutekohi, Ngāti Kahukuranui and Te Aitanga a Hauiti.

Three marae are located north of the main township:

- Puketawai Marae and Te Amowhiu meeting house is a meeting place of the Ngāti Porou hapū of Te Whānau a Te Rangipureora.
- Hinemaurea ki Mangatuna Marae and Hinemaurea meeting house is a meeting place of Ngāti Kahukuranui, a hapū of Te Aitanga-ā-Hauiti.
- Ōkurī Marae and meeting house is a meeting place of the Ngāti Porou hapū of Ngāti Ira and Ngāti Kahukuranui.

In October 2020, the Government committed $5,756,639 from the Provincial Growth Fund to upgrade 29 Ngāti Porou marae, including Te Rawheoro Marae, Hauiti Marae, Puketawai Marae and Hinemaurea ki Mangatuna Marae. The funding was expected to create 205 jobs.

== Education ==
Tolaga Bay Area School is a Year 1–13 state area school with a roll of 240. A native school operated from 1883 to 1884 and again from 1884 to 1886. It was replaced by Tolaga Bay School in 1888, which became Tolaga Bay District High School and later Tolaga Bay Area School.

Te Kura Kaupapa Māori o Mangatuna is a rural Year 1–8 Māori immersion school with a roll of 24 Mangatuna School was a Māori school founded in 1913 and integrated into the state system in 1969.

Both schools are co-educational. Rolls are as of July 2026.
