= Gisborne High School =

Gisborne High School may refer to:

In New Zealand:

- Gisborne Boys' High School
- Gisborne Girls' High School
