= LGBTQ history in New Zealand =

LGBTQ+ history in New Zealand refers to the diversity of practices, activism, and cultural understandings regarding sexual diversity and gender identities that have historically developed within the modern territory of New Zealand.

Homosexual acts were illegal in New Zealand under the influence of the British Empire, and same-sex relationships were originally punishable by capital punishment, though this penalty was never enforced. Over time, laws evolved, and in 1893, they were expanded to prohibit any sexual activity between men, carrying severe sanctions. However, New Zealand has made progress in the recognition and protection of LGBTQ rights. New Zealand society is generally open and accepting towards the LGBT community, which is reflected in parliamentary representation, legal protections, and the legalisation of same-sex marriage in 2013. Furthermore, the country maintains an active LGBTQ community, celebrating annual Pride festivals across its major cities.

== Pre-colonial period ==
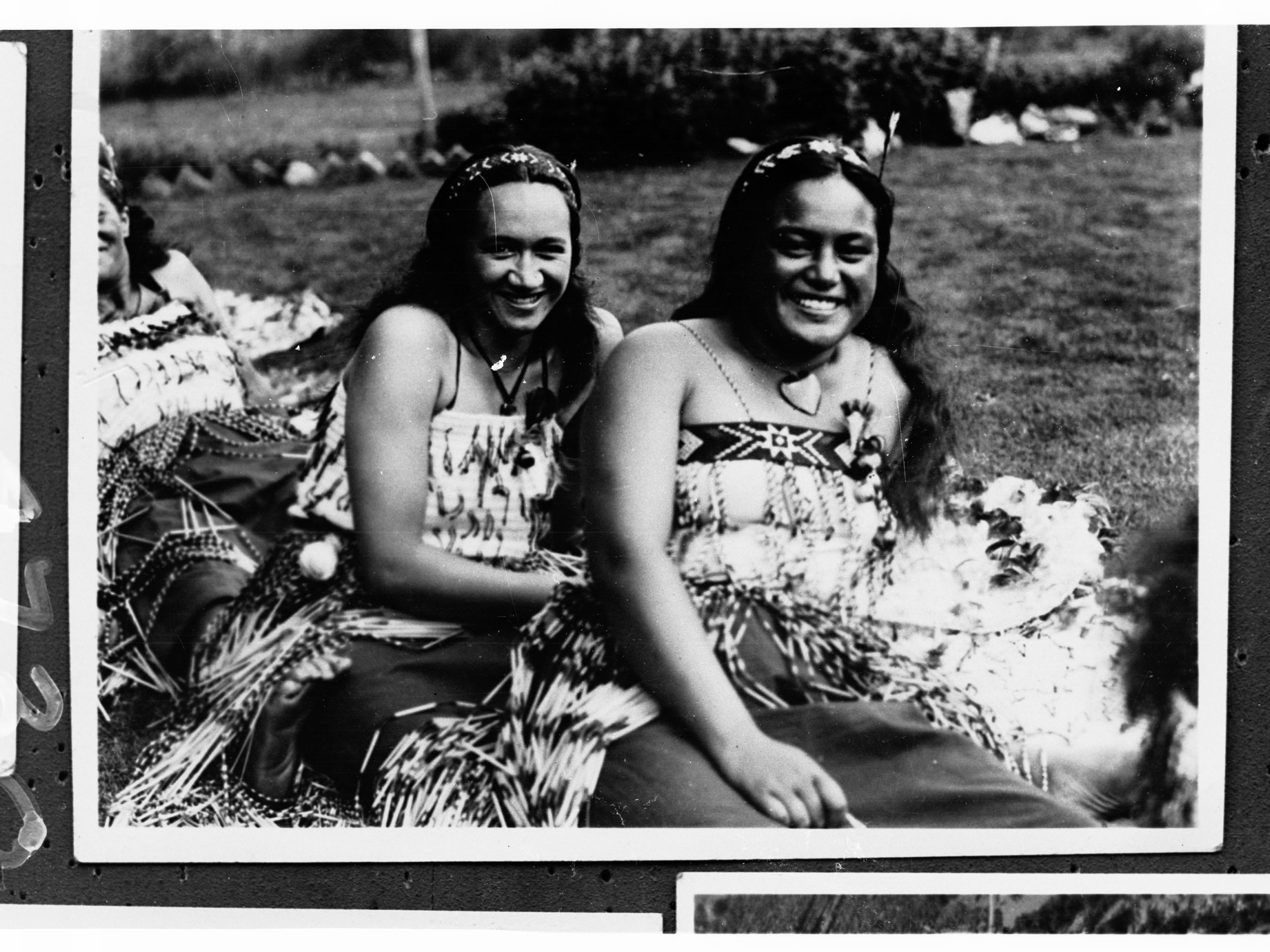
A pair of Māori women. In the pre-colonial period, relationships between Māori women were not criminalised.

The Māori language word takatāpui historically referred to intimate companion relationships between people of the same sex, but in modern terminology, it encompasses LGBT identity and sexuality. The word whakawāhine (literally 'to become a woman') describes those who were assigned male at birth but are women, while the term tangata ira tāne carries the opposite meaning, describing a person assigned female at birth who is a man.

Homosexuality, same-sex relationships, gender diversity, and people with diverse sex characteristics have been documented in Aotearoa for centuries. Scholar Elizabeth Kerekere has established that prior to the imposition of colonial law and morality, takatāpui were simply "part of the whānau [family]". Same-sex relationships and activities appear to have been acceptable among pre-colonial Māori. Certain traditional accounts, such as the story of Tutanekai and Tiki, focus on same-sex companionship. A British missionary, Richard Davis, noted that homosexual relationships between men were a familiar facet of Māori life; while relationships between women were less documented, they were certainly not condemned.

== Colonial period ==
There are several recorded examples of early settlers living in same-sex relationships alongside Māori. The best-documented case is that of the Reverend William Yate, an English missionary who lived with his male companion for two years in the Māori village of Waimate, prior to being sent back to England due to his homosexual behaviour. His relationship appeared to be accepted by the local Māori community, but it was heavily disapproved of by his religious colleagues. An investigation into allegations that Yate had engaged in sexual relations with young Māori men indicates that Māori held a more open attitude toward sexuality. Richard Davis observed that they "showed no shame. They simply stated they were unaware of any sin in such practices, and that Yate had not initiated them."

When New Zealand became a British colony in 1840, British law was adopted in its entirety, making sodomy illegal and a capital offence. In 1893, all forms of sexual activity between men were criminalised, with penalties extending to imprisonment, penal labour, and flogging. Conversely, sexual acts between women were never criminalised in New Zealand legislation.

== Underground subculture ==
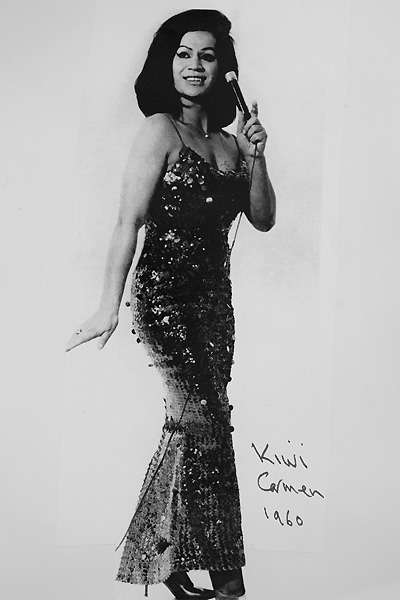
Carmen Rupe in 1960

Despite discriminatory laws, a small underground queer subculture developed over time. Pākehā settlers in the goldfields and rural districts were predominantly male, and some maintained sexual relationships with one another. However, as populations shifted into urban centres, prosecutions for homosexual acts increased.

Several gay men were closely involved in New Zealand's literary subculture, including Frank Sargeson, though homosexuality was not always accepted even within these creative circles.

By the 1930s, queer subcultures had developed a shared language, which emerged from elements of prison slang, Pig Latin, Polari, gay slang, Māori words, and local dialects. This language was predominantly spoken by male sex workers and transgender women. These communities frequently referred to themselves as kamp. Carmen Rupe identified as kamp while living in Auckland during the 1950s, recalling the "three aunties" who formed the core of her specific social circle: Hinemoa and Freda, who were Māori, and Auntie Mamie, from Rarotonga. Rupe noted that the three would prepare meticulously for their gatherings, serving as pillars of this local community.

Alongside private social functions, nightlife venues became essential hubs for these groups. Following changes to liquor licensing laws in 1967, Rupe established her first well-known venue, Carmen's International Coffee Lounge, located on Vivian Street in Wellington. Carmen's served as a social crossroads for people from all walks of life, frequently drawn by the reputation of its openly trans proprietor. It also functioned as a relatively safe environment for queer patrons, representing one of several trans-owned businesses that provided social and financial support to the local community. Chrissy Witoko's venue, The Evergreen, opened on Vivian Street in 1984 and fulfilled a similar role. It became a recognised community hub and a source of practical backing for early gay, lesbian, and sex-worker rights advocacy groups before the formal establishment of the New Zealand Prostitutes' Collective. Later, in late 1971, the KG (Kamp Girls) club was organised for lesbians in Auckland.

== Activism and law reform ==
In 1962, the Dorian Society was established in Wellington. A year later, they formed a legal sub-committee, the Wolfenden Association, which eventually developed into the Homosexual Law Reform Society. Early attempts to alter legislation included a formal petition presented to Parliament by the Homosexual Law Reform Society in 1968.

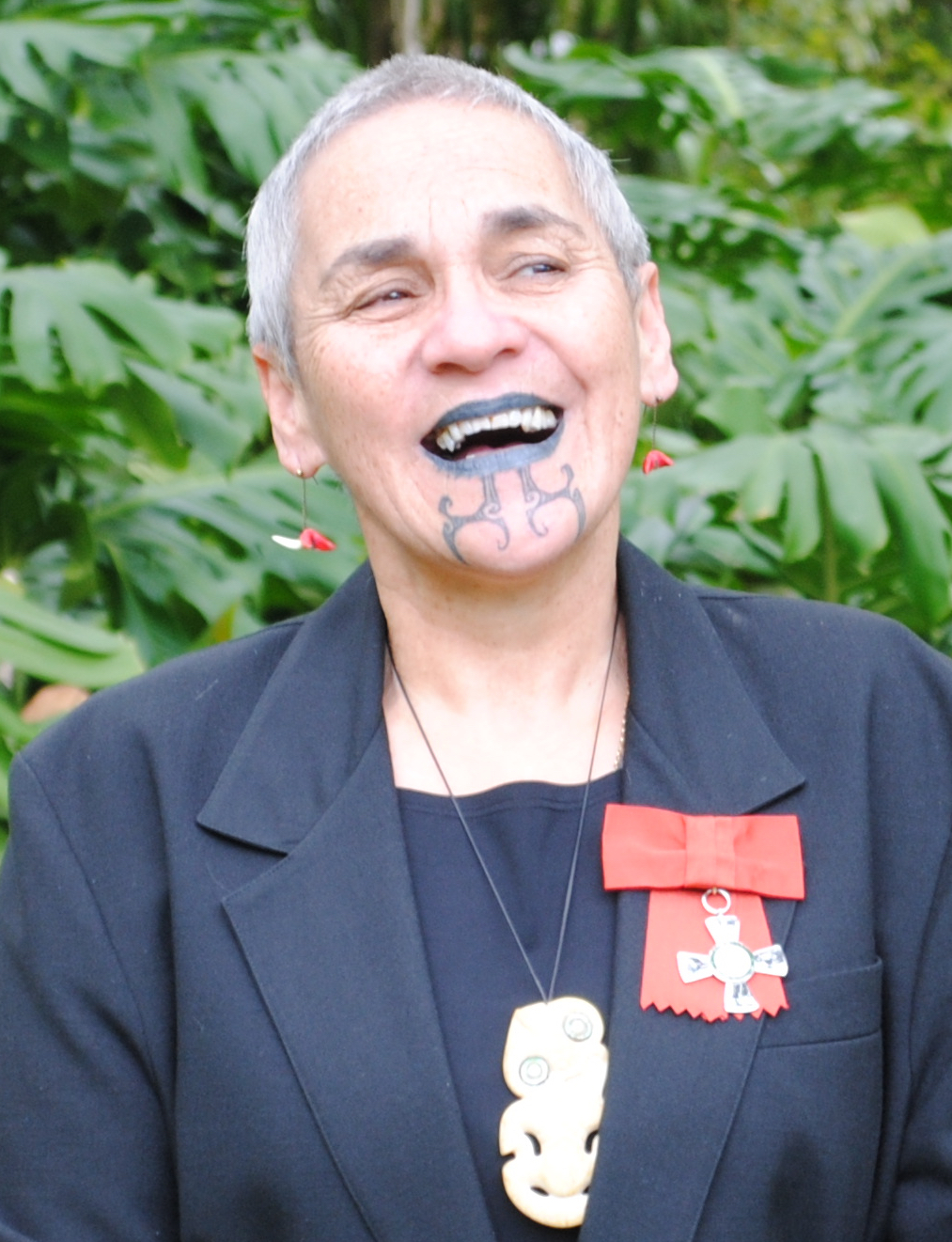
Ngahuia Te Awekotuku, a driving force behind the LGBT rights movement in New Zealand.

Violence directed against gay men and lesbians was frequently tolerated during this era. In 1964, Charles Aberhart was beaten to death in Christchurch's Hagley Park by a group of men who claimed he had made sexual advances towards them. The men were tried for murder but acquitted by the jury. As occurred in many countries, homosexual individuals were often institutionalised in mental facilities and subjected to psychiatric interventions for what was then categorised as a mental illness.

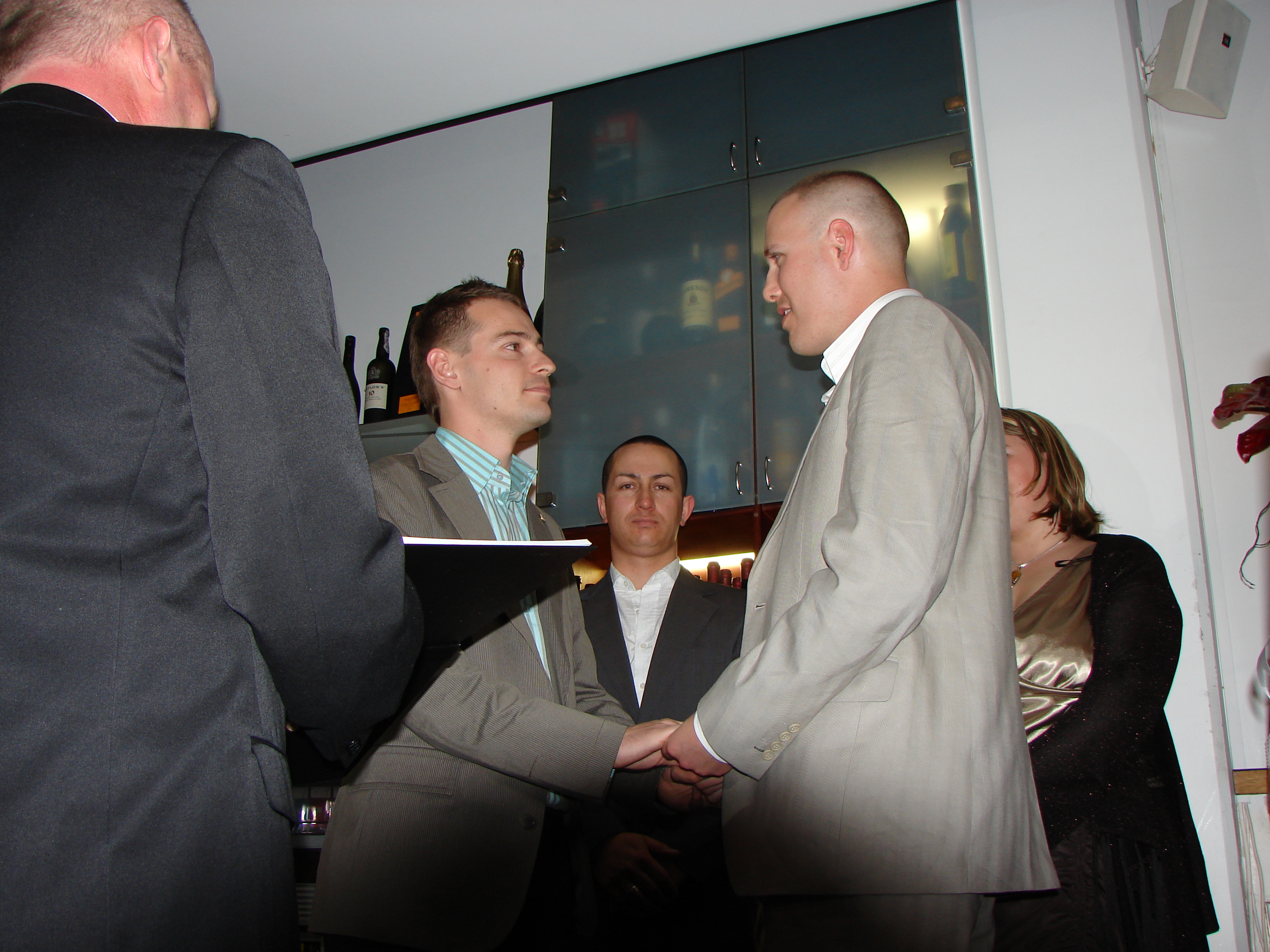
A civil union ceremony taking place in Wellington in 2006.

In 1972, academic Ngahuia Te Awekotuku was denied a visitor visa to the United States on the grounds of her sexual orientation. The public attention surrounding this incident served as a turning point, prompting the formation of gay liberation groups across Wellington, Christchurch, and Auckland. Organised by Te Awekotuku, a "Gay Day" protest took place in Auckland in April 1972, marking one of the earliest direct-action demonstrations by the newly established Auckland Gay Liberation Front.

In the same year, Hedesthia was established as New Zealand's first registered transgender organisation. While operating primarily as a social group, Hedesthia's members engaged in early advocacy by corresponding with media outlets and community groups to foster public understanding of trans issues. Noted mycologist Gillian F. Laundon was an active member of Hedesthia, and in 1976, she went on to found a specialised spin-off group named TransFormation to assist transsexual individuals.

The 1970s saw the rapid growth of the modern feminist and gay rights movements across New Zealand. In 1973, Sisters for Homophile Equality (SHE), a lesbian-feminist collective, was established in Wellington. By December of that year, SHE began publishing Circle which was a magazine that was later renamed the Lesbian Feminist Circle. It continued regular publication until 1986. Transgender activism also advanced during this decade; Carmen Rupe campaigned for the Wellington mayoralty in 1977, and Gillian Laundon successfully petitioned her employer that same year for the right to use female staff facilities.

Transgender, gay, and lesbian advocacy groups were not isolated from one another, showing a high degree of intersection and mutual collaboration. For instance, Hedesthia was a formal member of the National Gay Rights Coalition, an umbrella body formed in 1977 to unite distinct gay activist organisations. Suzan Xtabay, national coordinator for Hedesthia, observed that trans individuals shared:

...the responsibility to support all gay people, because whatever benefits are eventually won, wrung out of the system, will BENEFIT all of us... it is our cause, YOUR cause, and don't any of you forget it. Hedesthia DOES have a place in the gay movement, as do ALL its members.

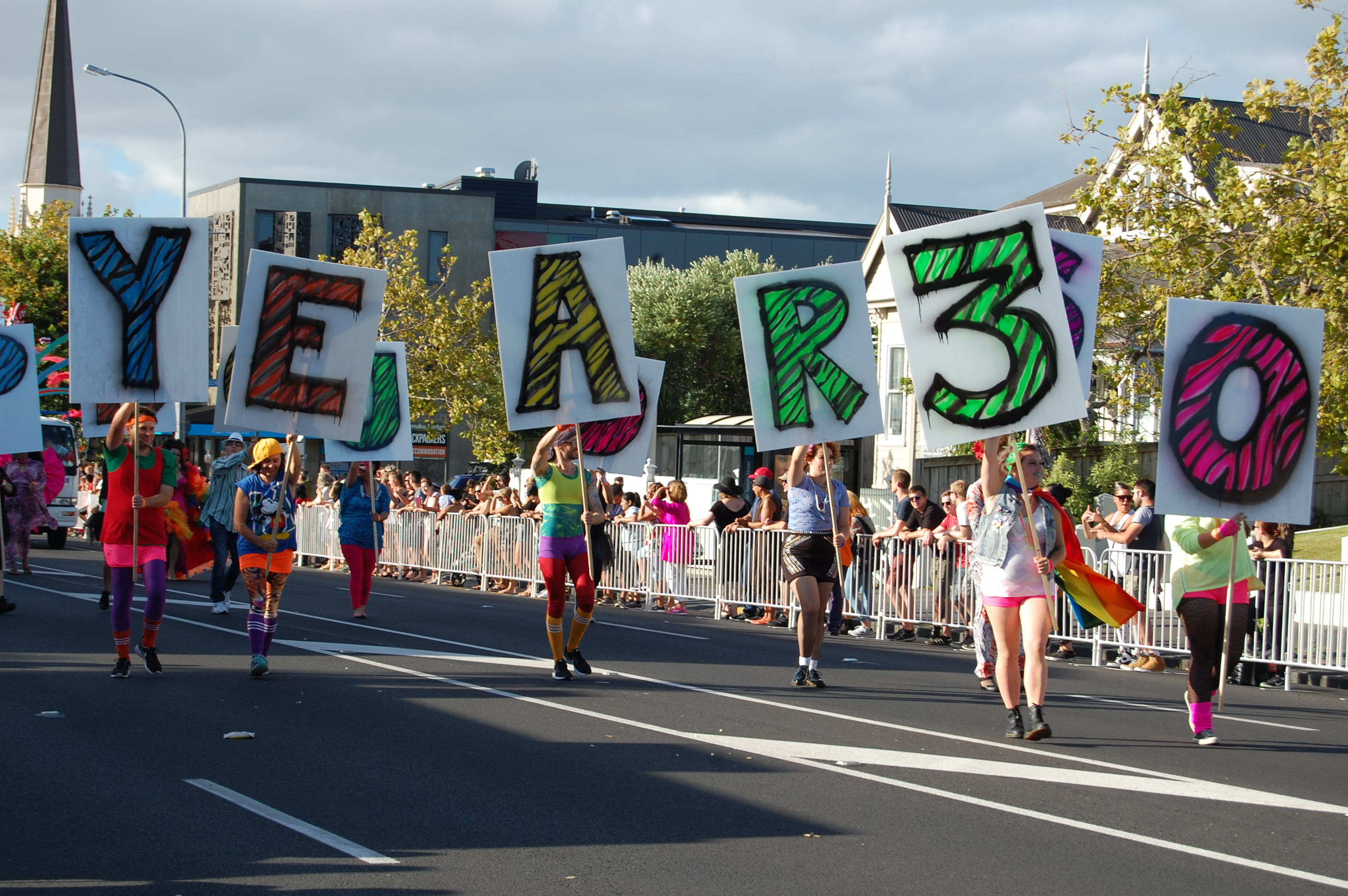
Marchers commemorating the 30th anniversary of the Homosexual Law Reform Act 1986.

Following several legislative attempts, the Homosexual Law Reform Act was passed in 1986, decriminalising sexual relations between men aged 16 and over. In 1993, discrimination on the basis of sexual orientation was legally prohibited under the Human Rights Act. New Zealand subsequently introduced civil unions for both same-sex and opposite-sex couples in 2004, followed by the complete legalisation of same-sex marriage in 2013.

New Zealand's passage of homosexual law reform occurred amidst the challenges of the emergence of HIV/AIDS. The New Zealand AIDS Foundation was established in 1985 to coordinate responses to the epidemic.

Advocates for the legislative change argued that removing the social stigma associated with homosexuality would improve public health interventions and simplify treatment efforts. The epidemic primarily affected the gay male community within New Zealand; statistical records since 1985 indicate that 53.7 per cent of local HIV diagnoses were attributed to male-to-male sexual contact. Consequently, gay men assumed roles in fundraising efforts and direct management of support organisations like the AIDS Foundation.

== Pride festivals ==
The Wellington Pride Parade taking place in 2018.

Beginning in 1986, Wellington hosted a regular annual Lesbian and Gay Fair. Upon relocating to a larger park venue, the event was renamed Out in the Park, which eventually grew into the annual Wellington Pride Festival. The festival was expanded to include a formal Pride Parade in 2017, resuming a tradition of street marches that began in the 1990s.

In 1992, Auckland established the Hero Parade, which grew to become one of the country's most well-known queer celebrations. The parade evolved into a broader festival framework, with the final original Hero Parade occurring in 2001. The street event returned to the city as the Auckland Pride Parade in 2013, before transitioning to its current form, the Auckland Pride March, in 2019.

== Social acceptance ==
Since the turn of the twenty-first century, New Zealand society and its public institutions have demonstrated a generally open attitude towards LGBT+ individuals, though isolated instances of discrimination continue to occur. Same-sex partnerships are integrated into the legal system, ensuring equal status regarding immigration, adoption, and broader statutory protections.

Although New Zealand's commercial queer scene remains modest compared to major international hubs, Auckland serves as a regional anchor with dedicated spaces and seasonal events. The city ranked globally as the 15th most gay-friendly city. Beyond Auckland, secondary urban centres and regional towns also support local LGBT social groups and events.

The use of online platforms and digital networks is widespread among gay men to build community links, particularly in rural or isolated localities where physical venues are absent. Since 2005, platforms like gay.co.nz have maintained a stable presence in the local digital space. Regional Pride Weeks take place throughout the country annually, alongside the signature Auckland Pride Festival, which has run since 2013 as New Zealand's largest celebration of diversity. Additionally, during the summer holiday period, dedicated community camps provide recurring outdoor social gatherings aimed at reinforcing intergenerational connection.

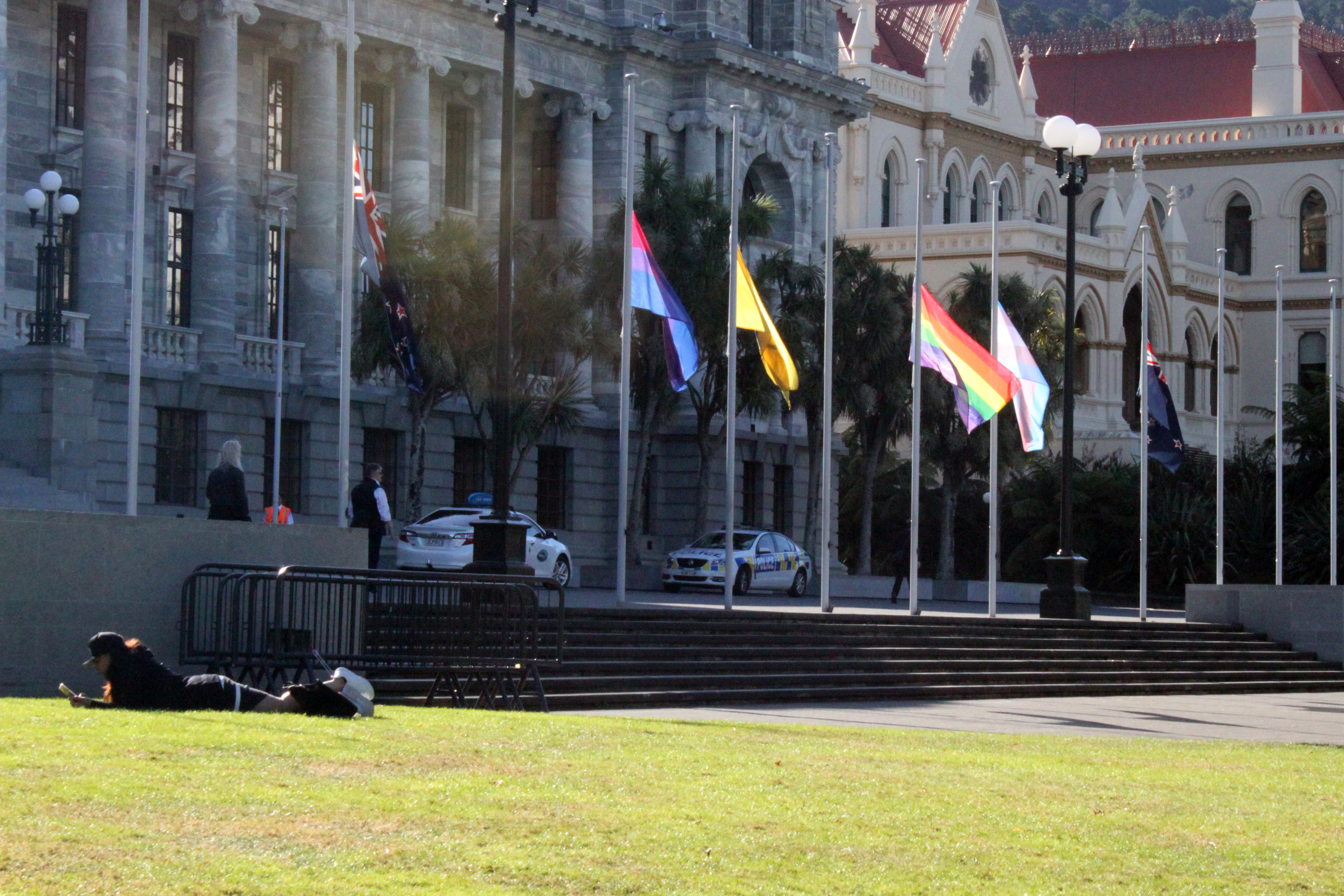
LGBT flags flying alongside the national flag at the New Zealand Parliament at the opening of the 2019 ILGA World Conference. The flags are at half-mast as a mark of respect following the 2019 Christchurch mosque attacks.

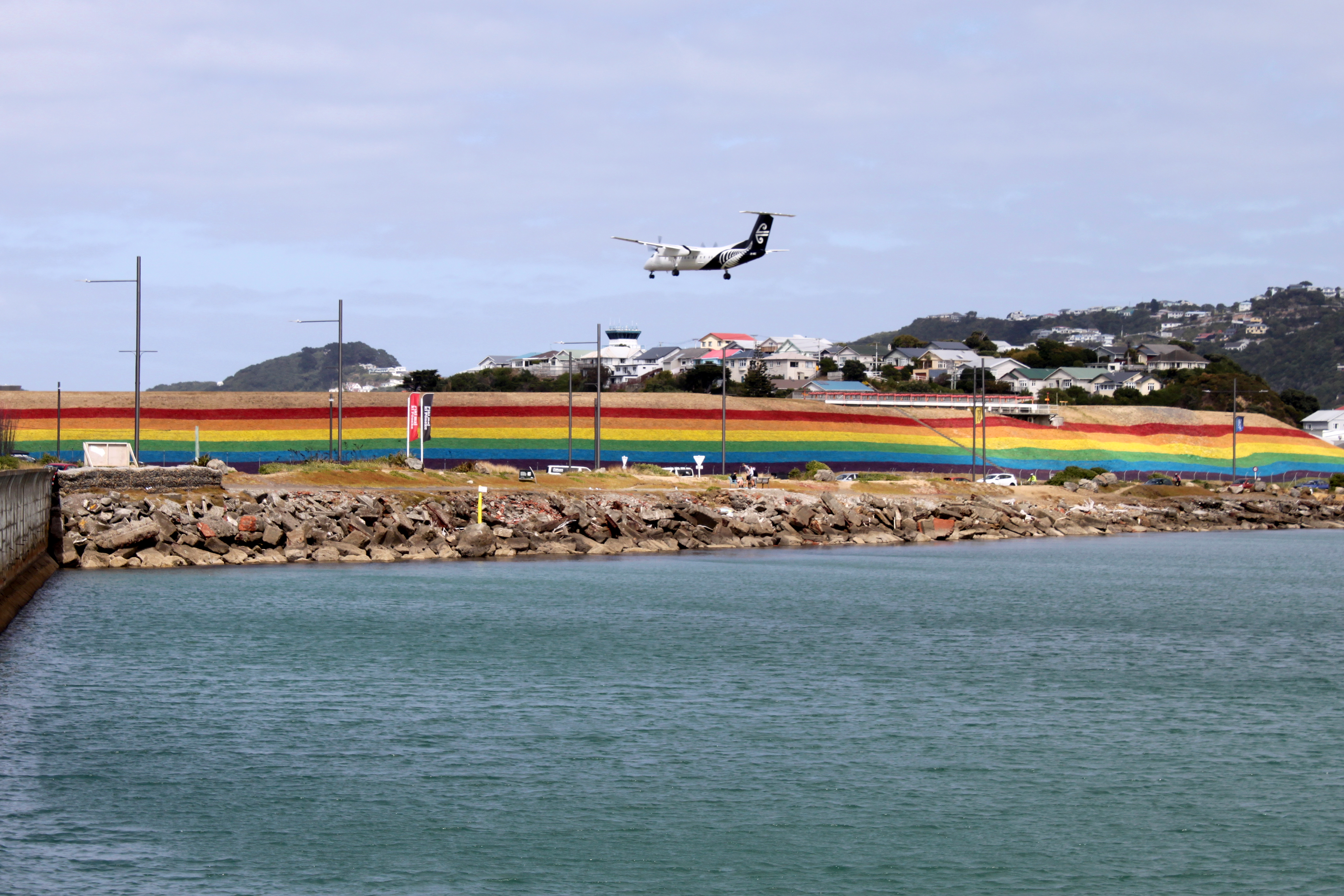
Wellington International Airport

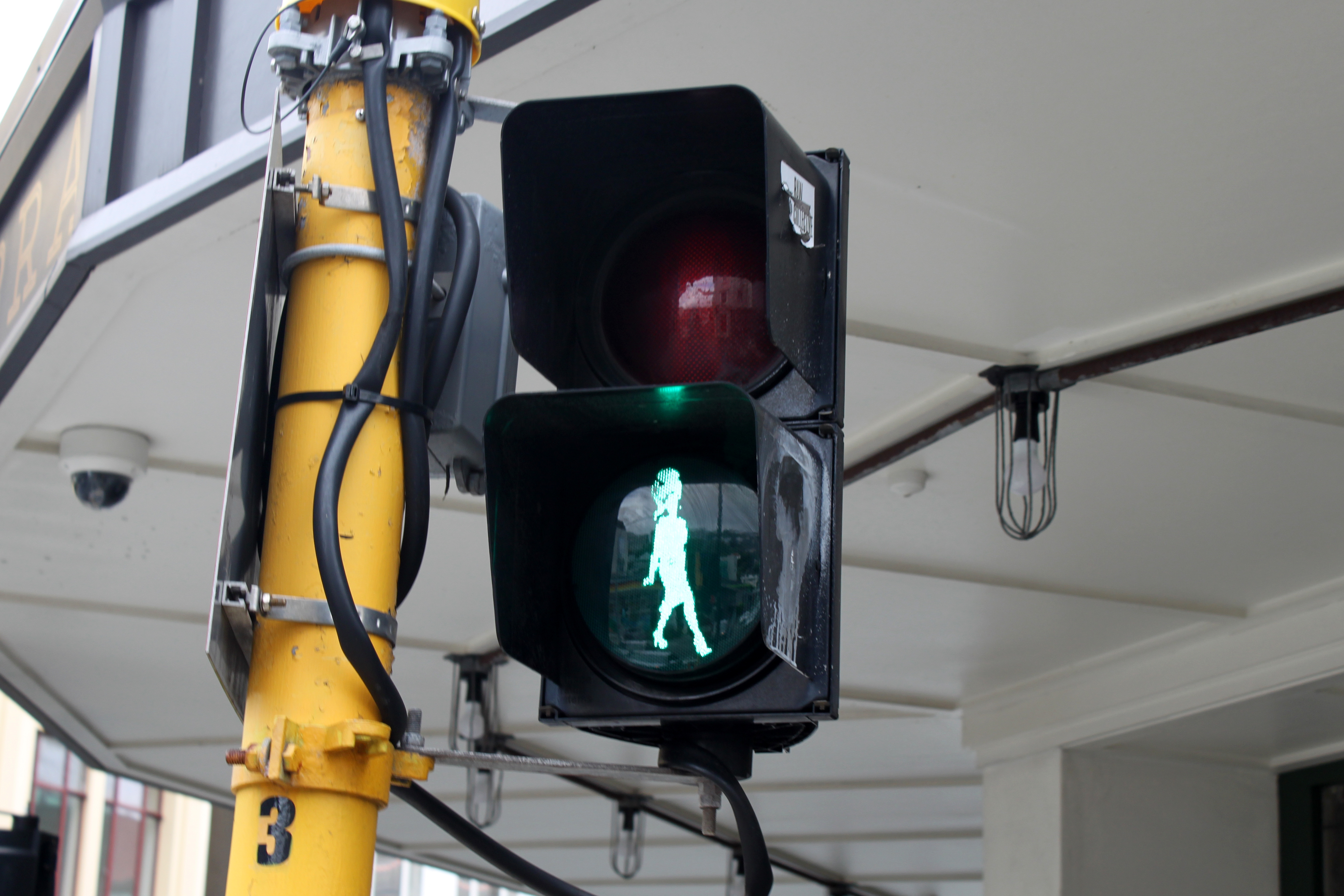
Wellington pedestrian crossing light installed as a tribute to Carmen Rupe.

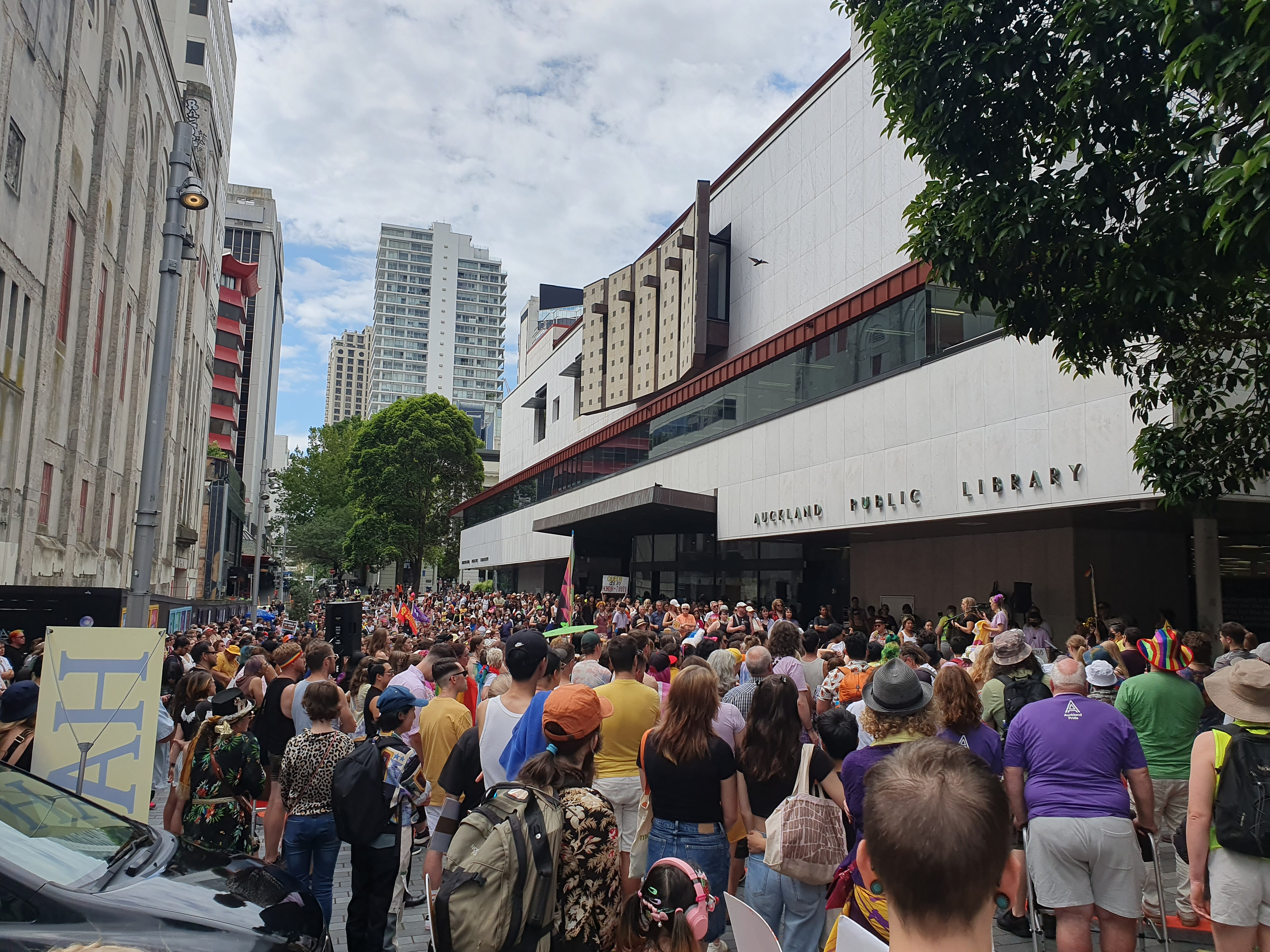
The Auckland Pride March in 2023.
