= Ngā Aho =

Network of Māori design professionals

Ngā Aho is a national network of Māori design professionals for people working in architecture, commercial design, engineering and project management based in Aotearoa New Zealand.

Ngā Aho started around 2005 and 2006 after the Ministry for Environment created an Urban Design Protocol that 'failed to meaningfully engage with Māori aspirations and interests in the built environment'.

In 2017 Te Kāhui Whaihanga New Zealand Institute of Architects (NZIA) and Ngā Aho signed an agreement of an 'ongoing relationship of co-operation between the two groups'. It was called Te Kawenata o Rata and signed by Desna Whaanga-Schollum, Rau Hoskins and kaumatua Haare Williams on behalf of Ngā Aho and Christina van Bohemen and Pip Cheshire on behalf of NZIA. There was a dawn ceremony to recognise the occasion.

In 2024 Ngā Aho received the International Prize award from the Royal Architectural Institute of Canada (RAIC) as 'recognition is a testament to the exceptional talent and hard work that Nga Aho has brought to the International and Canadian architectural communities'.

Sim'oogit Saa-Bax Patrick Stewart of McEwen School of Architecture, Laurentian University said, "Around the Pacific Rim, Nga Aho have remained as leaders in the built environment of Indigenous Peoples. When we embarked on our journey to bring our nations together, we looked to Nga Aho."

People who have chaired Ngā Aho include Rau Hoskins and Desna Whaanga-Schollum.

One of the actions of Ngā Aho has been to support Te Aranga Māori Design Principles that were developed by Māori design professionals developed and adopted by the Auckland Council for council built projects.

The New Zealand Institute of Architects has had Elisapeta Heta as a representative of Ngā Aho on the board and the current representative is Matt Ritani.
