= Wainui Beach =

Settlement in Gisborne District, New Zealand

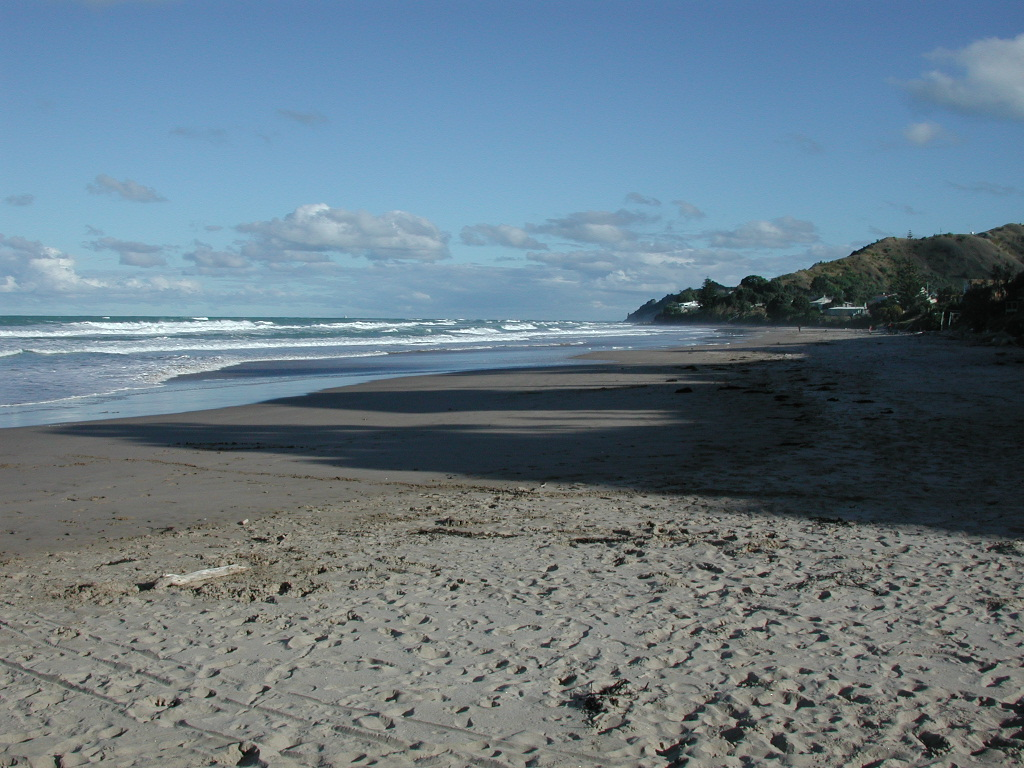
- Wainui Beach
- Interactive map of Wainui Beach
- Coordinates: 38°41′20″S 178°04′20″E
- Country: New Zealand
- Region: Gisborne District
- Ward: Tairāwhiti General Ward
- Electorates: East Cape; Ikaroa-Rāwhiti (Māori)

Government
  - Territorial authority: Gisborne District Council
  - Mayor of Gisborne: Rehette Stoltz
  - East Cape MP: Dana Kirkpatrick
  - Ikaroa-Rāwhiti MP: Cushla Tangaere-Manuel

Area
  - Total: 1.40 km^{2} (0.54 sq mi)

Population (2023 Census)
  - Total: 873
  - Density: 624/km^{2} (1,620/sq mi)

Wainui Beach is a small settlement on the coast of New Zealand's North Island, located just to the north of Tuaheni Point, some 8 km to the east of Gisborne, to which it is linked by State Highway 35.

The beach is one of the NZ Automobile Association's 101 Must-do places for Kiwis. It is noted for its consistent surf breaks. Wainui Beach's most notable residents have been the Quinn family, which contains three national champion surfers - brothers Maz and Jay, and sister Holly.

== Demographics ==
Wainui Beach covers 1.40 km^{2} (0.54 sq mi). It is part of the Wainui-Okitu statistical area.

Historical population for Wainui Beach
Year	Pop.	±% p.a.
2006	672	—
2013	720	+0.99%
2018	819	+2.61%
2023	873	+1.29%

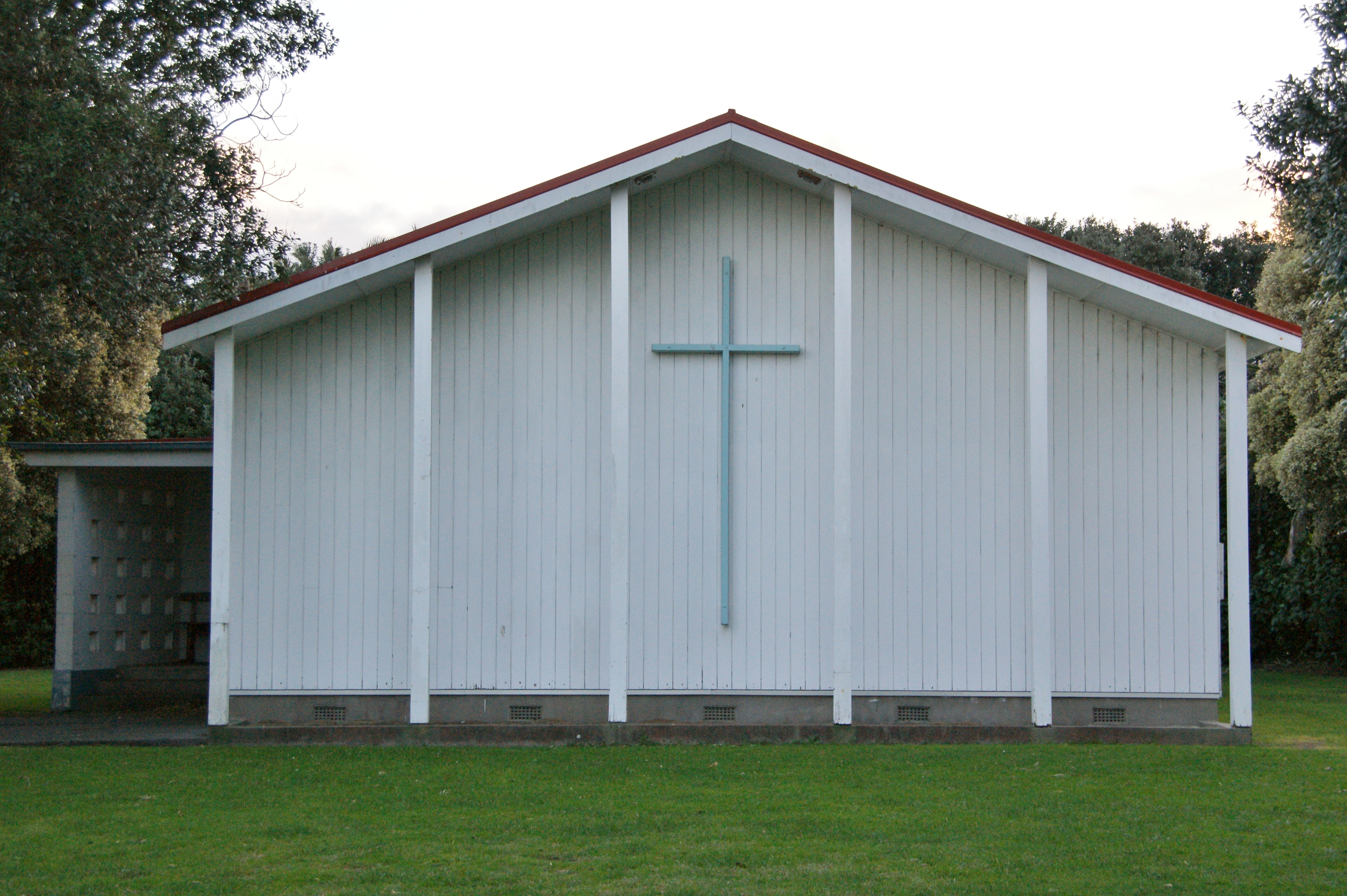
Wainui Church

Wainui Beach had a population of 873 in the 2023 New Zealand census, an increase of 54 people (6.6%) since the 2018 census, and an increase of 153 people (21.2%) since the 2013 census. There were 429 males and 435 females in 318 dwellings. 1.4% of people identified as LGBTIQ+. There were 201 people (23.0%) aged under 15 years, 99 (11.3%) aged 15 to 29, 390 (44.7%) aged 30 to 64, and 183 (21.0%) aged 65 or older.

People could identify as more than one ethnicity. The results were 89.3% European (Pākehā); 19.6% Māori; 1.4% Pasifika; 3.1% Asian; 2.4% Middle Eastern, Latin American and African New Zealanders (MELAA); and 3.4% other, which includes people giving their ethnicity as "New Zealander". English was spoken by 97.9%, Māori by 5.2%, and other languages by 10.0%. No language could be spoken by 1.7% (e.g. too young to talk). The percentage of people born overseas was 22.3, compared with 28.8% nationally.

Religious affiliations were 30.9% Christian, 0.3% Hindu, 1.0% Māori religious beliefs, 0.7% Buddhist, 0.3% New Age, 0.7% Jewish, and 1.7% other religions. People who answered that they had no religion were 57.0%, and 6.5% of people did not answer the census question.

Of those at least 15 years old, 288 (42.9%) people had a bachelor's or higher degree, 300 (44.6%) had a post-high school certificate or diploma, and 75 (11.2%) people exclusively held high school qualifications. 141 people (21.0%) earned over $100,000 compared to 12.1% nationally. The employment status of those at least 15 was 327 (48.7%) full-time, 120 (17.9%) part-time, and 15 (2.2%) unemployed.

=== Wainui-Okitu statistical area ===
Wainui-Okitu statistical area, which also includes Okitū, covers 6.20 km^{2} (2.39 sq mi) and had an estimated population of 2,080 as of June 2025, with a population density of 335 people per km^{2}.

Historical population for Wainui-Okitu
Year	Pop.	±% p.a.
2006	1,356	—
2013	1,500	+1.45%
2018	1,755	+3.19%
2023	2,004	+2.69%
The 2006 population is for a smaller area of 5.36 km^{2}. Source:

Wainui-Okitu had a population of 2,004 in the 2023 New Zealand census, an increase of 249 people (14.2%) since the 2018 census, and an increase of 504 people (33.6%) since the 2013 census. There were 999 males, 1,005 females, and 3 people of other genders in 729 dwellings. 1.8% of people identified as LGBTIQ+. The median age was 42.2 years (compared with 38.1 years nationally). There were 456 people (22.8%) aged under 15 years, 258 (12.9%) aged 15 to 29, 933 (46.6%) aged 30 to 64, and 357 (17.8%) aged 65 or older.

People could identify as more than one ethnicity. The results were 88.6% European (Pākehā); 22.9% Māori; 1.8% Pasifika; 3.0% Asian; 3.1% Middle Eastern, Latin American and African New Zealanders (MELAA); and 3.1% other, which includes people giving their ethnicity as "New Zealander". English was spoken by 98.2%, Māori by 4.0%, and other languages by 10.8%. No language could be spoken by 1.3% (e.g. too young to talk). New Zealand Sign Language was known by 0.3%. The percentage of people born overseas was 22.0, compared with 28.8% nationally.

Religious affiliations were 29.5% Christian, 0.4% Hindu, 0.6% Māori religious beliefs, 0.4% Buddhist, 0.6% New Age, 0.4% Jewish, and 1.5% other religions. People who answered that they had no religion were 60.0%, and 6.6% of people did not answer the census question.

Of those at least 15 years old, 642 (41.5%) people had a bachelor's or higher degree, 723 (46.7%) had a post-high school certificate or diploma, and 186 (12.0%) people exclusively held high school qualifications. The median income was $52,600, compared with $41,500 nationally. 294 people (19.0%) earned over $100,000 compared to 12.1% nationally. The employment status of those at least 15 was 828 (53.5%) full-time, 276 (17.8%) part-time, and 27 (1.7%) unemployed.

== Parks ==
Wainui Beach has two main park areas. Wainui Reserve is a sports ground. Wainui Beach and Lysnar Reserve includes the main beach, a boat ramp and boat fishing area, a dog walking area, and an area for horse riding and kite surfing.

== Education ==
Wainui Beach School is Year 1–6 co-educational state primary school with a roll of 232 students as of July 2026. It opened in 1962.
