= Maz Quinn =

New Zealand surfer

Personal information
- Born: 7 August 1976 (age 50)
- Height: 6 ft 0 in (183 cm)

Surfing career
- Sport: Surfing
- Sponsors: Quiksilver

Surfing specifications
- Stance: Regular (natural foot)
- Favorite waves: Wainui Beach, France, Indonesia

Maz Quinn (born 7 August 1976) is a New Zealand surfer. A four-time winner of New Zealand's national surfing championships and winner of the 1996 Billabong Pro-Junior Series, Quinn is regarded as one of the country's foremost surfers.

Quinn was born in Hamilton, but his family moved to Gisborne when he was two years old. He was educated at Elgin Primary School, Gisborne Intermediate and Gisborne Boys' High School. Always an enthusiastic surfer, his passion for the sport increased when the family moved to the small community of Wainui Beach when he was a teenager. Quinn comes from a surfing family – his younger brother Jay and sister Holly have both won national titles, his mother is an advocate for Women's surfing and his father was a national official.

During the 1990s, Quinn took part in the World Qualifying Series, a lower-ranked pro tour which enables surfers to attempt to qualify for the elite World Championship Tour. In 1999 Maz became the first New Zealander to win a WQS event and in 2001 he became the first New Zealander ever to qualify for the World Championship Tour, in doing so becoming one of the world's top 44 ranked male surfers.

In 2009, Quinn helped to stage the Quiksilver Maz Quinn King of the Groms, a national surfing event for youth.
