= Ngāhuia Te Awekōtuku =

New Zealand academic and activist (born 1949)

Ngāhuia Te Awekōtuku MNZM
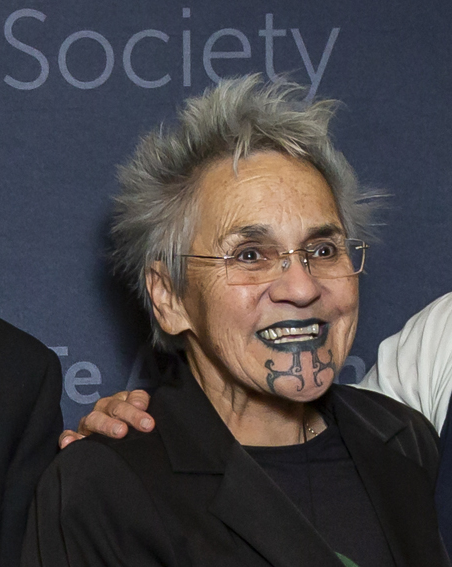
- Te Awekōtuku in 2019
- Born: 1949 (age 76–77)

Academic background
- Education: University of Auckland (MA, PhD)

Academic work
- Discipline: Māori studies
- Institutions: Victoria University of Wellington; Waikato University
- Doctoral students: Mere Whaanga, Ngarino Ellis
- Notable works: Mau Moko: the world of Maori tattoo

Ngāhuia Te Awekōtuku MNZM (born 1949) is a New Zealand academic specialising in Māori cultural issues and a lesbian activist. In 1972, she was famously denied a visa to visit the United States on the basis of her sexuality.

== Biography ==
Te Awekōtuku is descended from Te Arawa, Tūhoe and Waikato iwi (tribe).

As a student, she was a member of the activist group Ngā Tamatoa at the University of Auckland. Her Master of Arts thesis was on Janet Frame and her PhD on the effects of tourism on the Te Arawa people.

Te Awekōtuku has worked across the heritage, culture and academic sectors as a curator, lecturer, researcher and activist. Her areas of research interest include gender issues, museums, body modification, power and powerlessness, spirituality and ritual. She has been curator of ethnology at the Waikato Museum; lecturer in art history at Auckland University, and professor of Māori studies at Victoria University of Wellington. She was Professor of Research and Development at Waikato University. She and Marilyn Waring contributed the piece "Foreigners in our own land" to the 1984 anthology Sisterhood Is Global: The International Women's Movement Anthology, edited by Robin Morgan. Although now retired, she continues to write and mentor students. Notable students include Mere Whaanga and Ngarino Ellis.

== Visitor's permit denial ==
In 1972, Te Awekōtuku was denied a visitor's permit to the United States on the grounds that she was a homosexual. Publicity around the incident was a catalyst in the formation of gay liberation groups in New Zealand. This may have been related to a TV interview she gave in 1971, in which she described herself as a 'sapphic woman'.

== Research ==
=== Tā moko ===
Te Awekōtuku has researched and written extensively on the traditional and contemporary practices of tā moko (tattoo) in New Zealand. Her 2007 (re-published in 2011) book Mau Moko: the world of Maori tattoo, co-authored with Linda Waimarie Nikora, was the product of a five-year long research project conducted by the Māori and Psychology Research Unit at the University of Waikato, funded by a Marsden Fund grant.

=== Death practices in Māori culture ===
In 2009, Te Awekōtuku and Linda Waimarie Nikora received a $950,000 Marsden Fund grant as lead researchers in the Māori and Psychology Research Unit at Waikato University for the research project Apakura: the Maori way of death. A further $250,000 was received from the Ngā Pae o te Māramatanga National Institute of Research Excellence to explore past and present practices around tangihanga.

== Recognition ==
In the 2010 New Year Honours, Te Awekōtuku was appointed a Member of the New Zealand Order of Merit for services to Māori culture. In 2017, she won an Auckland Museum Medal. Also in 2017, Te Awekōtuku was selected as one of the Royal Society Te Apārangi's "150 women in 150 words", celebrating the contributions of women to knowledge in New Zealand.

Te Awekōtuku books, Mana Wahine Maori: Selected writings on Maori women's art, culture and politics, published in 1991, and Mau Moko: The world of Māori tattoo, published in 2007, were selected as two of the 180 most significant works of Māori-authored non-fiction through inclusion in Books of Mana.

Her memoir, Hine Toa, was a finalist for the General Nonfiction Award at the 2025 Ockham New Zealand Book Awards.

== Selected publications ==
- Hine Toa: A story of bravery, HarperCollins, 2024. ISBN 9781775492634
- He tikanga whakaaro: Research ethics in the Maori community: A discussion paper Ministry of Māori Affairs

=== On art and artists ===
- We will become ill if we stop weaving. From Mana Whina Maori Selected writings on Maori Women's art, culture and politics. Republished in ATE Journal of Māori Art, 2020, vol 2 pp. 90–103.
- E ngaa uri whakatupu – weaving legacies : Dame Rangimarie Hetet and Diggeress Te Kanawa, Hamilton: Waikato Museum Te Whare Taonga o Waikato, 2015. ISBN 9780473326036
- 'Traditions endure : Five Maori Painters at Auckland Art Gallery', Art New Zealand, Winter 2014, no. 150, pp. 58–61.
- 'A glorious tradition', Art New Zealand, Winter 2003, no.103.
- Unveiling our hidden treasures : the Seventh Pacific Festival of Arts 1996;', Art New Zealand, Summer 1996/1997, no. 81, pp. 42–45,84.
- 'Forgiving, but never forgetting : Shared Visions at the Auckland City Art Gallery', Art New Zealand, Winter 1996, no. 79, pp. 74–77.
- 'He Take Ano: Another Take – Conversations with Lisa Reihana', Art New Zealand, Spring 1993, no. 68, pp. 84–87
- 'Kura Te Waru Rewiri', Art New Zealand, Spring 1993, no. 68, pp. 91–93
- Mana wahine Maori: Selected writings on Maori women's art, culture and politics, Auckland: New Women's Press, 1991. ISBN 0908652631
- 'Art and the spirit', New Zealand Geographic, Jan/Mar 1990, no. 5, pp. 93–97.
- 'Mats of the Pacific', Art New Zealand, Spring 1989, no. 52, pp..88–90
- 'Te whakahoutanga o Te Winika (The restoration of Te Winika)', New Zealand Listener, 28 November 1987, p. 67.
- 'Ngahuia Te Awekotuku in conversation with Elizabeth Eastmond and Priscilla Pitts’, Antic, no. 1, 1986.

=== On tā moko ===
- 'Tā Moko: Māori Tattoo', in Goldie, (1997) exhibition catalogue, Auckland: Auckland City Art Gallery and David Bateman, pp. 108–114.
- 'More than Skin Deep', in Barkan, E. and Bush, R. (eds.), Claiming the Stone: Naming the Bones: Cultural Property and the Negotiation of National and Ethnic Identity (2002) Los Angeles: Getty Press, pp. 243–254.
- Ta Moko: Culture, body modification, and the psychology of identity, paper given at the Proceedings of the National Māori Graduates of Psychology Symposium 2002.
- Ngahuia Te Awekotuku, with Linda Waimarie Nikora, Mohi Rua, your face: wearing Moko – Maori facial marking in today’s world, paper given at Tatau/Tattoo: Embodied art and cultural exchange conference, Victoria University of Wellington, 21–22 August 2003.
- Ngahuia Te Awekotuku, with Linda Waimarie Nikora, Mohi Rua and Rolinda Karapu, Mau moko : the world of Māori tattoo, Auckland: Penguin Books, 2011. ISBN 9780143566854

=== On death practices in Māori culture ===
- Tess Moeke-Maxwell, Linda Waimarie Nikora, and Ngahuia Te Awekotuku, 'Manaakitanga: Ethical research with Māori who are dying', in M. Agee, T. McIntosh, P. Culbertson, & C. Makasiale (eds.), Pacific Identities and Well-Being – Cross Cultural Perspectives, London: Routledge, 2003, pp. 188–203.
- Vincent Malcolm-Buchanan, Lina Waimarie Nikora and Ngahuia Te Awekotuku, Cloaked in Life and Death: Korowai, kaitiaki and tangihanga, MAI Journal, vol. 1, no. 1, 2012.
- Tess Moeke-Maxwell, Linda Waimarie Nikora, and Ngahuia Te Awekotuku, 'End-of-life care and Māori whānau resilience', MAI Journal, vol. 3, no. 2, pp. 140–152.

== Further information ==
- Interview with Ngahuia Te Awekōtuku, 'Nine to Noon programme, RNZ National, 25 June 2013
- Ngahuia Te Awekotuku: Sustaining the art of moko presentation for the Royal Society of New Zealand, June 2014
- Te Awekotuku, Ngahuia. Routledge International Encyclopedia of Queer Culture, 2012 page 553.
