= Mere Whaanga =

New Zealand writer, illustrator, historian, researcher and academic

Mere Whaanga is a New Zealand writer, illustrator, historian, researcher and academic whose work includes bilingual picture books, history books and conference papers. Several of her books have been shortlisted for or won awards and she herself has received a number of awards, grants, fellowships and writing residencies. She lives in Māhia, Hawke's Bay.

== Biography ==
Mere Joslyn (Komako) Whaanga (also published under the name Mere Whaanga-Schollum) was born on 23 January 1952 in Wairoa, Hawke's Bay. She grew up on an isolated sheep station near Gisborne on the East Coast of New Zealand and was educated at Hukarere Māori Girls' College and Gisborne Girls' High School.

After leaving school, she had various jobs including laboratory assistant, sales rep and tutor before returning to study as a mature student. She studied Te Reo Māori Paetoru at Tairawhiti Polytechnic in Gisborne in 1992–1993 and went on to complete a graduate diploma in Māori Development from Massey University in 1994 and an MPhil in Māori Studies, also from Massey University, in 1999. She has a doctorate from the University of Waikato on Māori land law. Her doctoral research was supervised by Ngahuia Te Awekotuku.

Mere Whaanga's writing includes history books, bilingual picture books, conference papers, articles, poetry and reviews. Her artwork has also featured in exhibitions in New Zealand and Australia.

She lives in Mahia and is of Ngāti Rongomaiwahine and Ngāti Kahungunu descent.

Mere Whaanga's three children are practising artists – Miriama Reid, Desna Whaanga-Schollum and Clem Whaanga-Schollum.

== Awards and prizes ==
Tangaroa's Gift: Te Koha a Tangaroa (1990) was a finalist in the 1991 AIM Children's Book Awards, the NZLA Russell Clark Award for illustration and the NZLA Esther Glen Award for literature. In 2011, Mere Whaanga also received the Storylines Gaelyn Gordon Award for Tangaroa's Gift.

The singing dolphin: Te Aihe i Waiata was a finalist in the Picture Book category of the 2017 New Zealand Book Awards for Children and Young Adults.

A Carved Cloak for Tahu was a finalist in the History section of the Montana New Zealand Book Awards 2005.

Mere Whaanga has received a number of awards, including the Choysa Bursary for Children's Writers in 1988, Te Ha Award for Māori Writers in 1991, QEII Literary Fund Incentive Grant in 1991, Te Waka Toi New Work Grant in 2002, the Ministry of Culture and Heritage Fellowship in Māori History in 2001–2003. and a New Zealand History Research Trust Fund Award in 2003. Her expertise has been recognised in her appointments as judge for the Aim Children's Book Awards (1993–94) and the New Zealand Post Book Awards for Children and Young Adults (1997–98).

In 2015, she was awarded the Michael King Writers Centre Māori Writer's Residency to work on an adult novel, and in 2017 she was the University of Otago College of Education / Creative New Zealand Children's Writer in Residence.

== Bibliography ==
Picture books

Legend of the Seven Whales of Ngāi Tahu Matawhaiti: He Pakiwaitara o nga Tahora Tokowhitu a Ngāi Tahu Matawhaiti (Mahia Publishers, 1988; republished by Scholastic, 1990)

Tangaroa's Gift: Te Koha a Tangaroa (Ashton Scholastic, 1990)

Te Kooti's Diamond: Te Taimana a Te Kooti (Ashton Scholastic, 1991)

The Treaty: Te Tiriti (Scholastic, 2003)

The Singing Dolphin: Te Aihe i Waiata (Scholastic, 2017)

History

Bartlett: Mahia to Tawatapu (Mahia Publishers, 1990)

A Carved Cloak for Tahu (Auckland University Press, 2004). The book was listed in Books of Mana as one of the 180 most significant works of Māori-authored non-fiction.
