= Okitū =

Settlement in Gisborne District, New Zealand

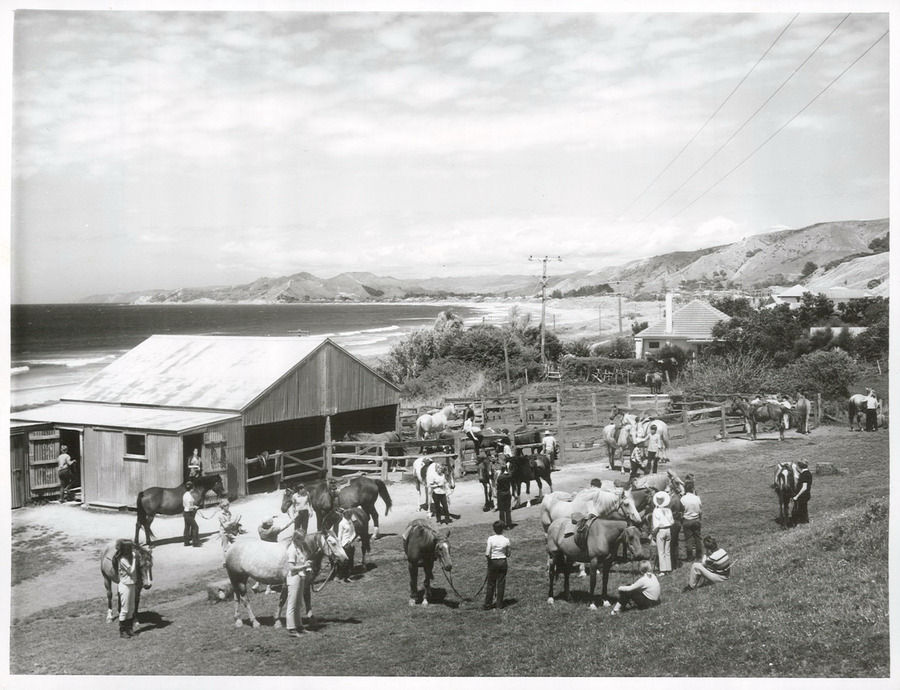
- Horse riding at Wainui Beach, January 1971
- Interactive map of Okitū
- Coordinates: 38.675°S 178.083°E
- Country: New Zealand
- Region: Gisborne District
- Ward: Tairāwhiti General Ward
- Electorates: East Cape; Ikaroa-Rāwhiti (Māori)

Government
  - Territorial authority: Gisborne District Council
  - Mayor of Gisborne: Rehette Stoltz
  - East Cape MP: Dana Kirkpatrick
  - Ikaroa-Rāwhiti MP: Cushla Tangaere-Manuel

Area
  - Total: 2.55 km^{2} (0.98 sq mi)

Population (2023 Census)
  - Total: 801
  - Density: 314/km^{2} (814/sq mi)

Okitū is a suburb and coastal settlement of Gisborne, in the Gisborne District of New Zealand's North Island. It is located north east of Wainui Beach.

The name was officially modified to include a macron in 2021.

== Demographics ==
Okitū covers 2.55 km^{2} (0.98 sq mi). It is part of the Wainui-Okitu statistical area.

Historical population
Year	Pop.	±% p.a.
2006	639	—
2013	657	+0.40%
2018	708	+1.51%
2023	801	+2.50%
The 2006 population is for a smaller area of 1.70 km^{2}. Source:

Okitū had a population of 801 in the 2023 New Zealand census, an increase of 93 people (13.1%) since the 2018 census, and an increase of 144 people (21.9%) since the 2013 census. There were 402 males, 396 females, and 3 people of other genders in 300 dwellings. 2.2% of people identified as LGBTIQ+. There were 159 people (19.9%) aged under 15 years, 129 (16.1%) aged 15 to 29, 378 (47.2%) aged 30 to 64, and 135 (16.9%) aged 65 or older.

People could identify as more than one ethnicity. The results were 86.9% European (Pākehā); 25.5% Māori; 1.5% Pasifika; 3.0% Asian; 4.1% Middle Eastern, Latin American and African New Zealanders (MELAA); and 4.5% other, which includes people giving their ethnicity as "New Zealander". English was spoken by 98.5%, Māori by 3.4%, and other languages by 12.4%. No language could be spoken by 1.9% (e.g. too young to talk). The percentage of people born overseas was 22.5, compared with 28.8% nationally.

Religious affiliations were 28.8% Christian, 0.7% Hindu, 0.4% Māori religious beliefs, 0.4% Buddhist, 0.7% New Age, and 1.1% other religions. People who answered that they had no religion were 61.0%, and 7.1% of people did not answer the census question.

Of those at least 15 years old, 267 (41.6%) people had a bachelor's or higher degree, 294 (45.8%) had a post-high school certificate or diploma, and 78 (12.1%) people exclusively held high school qualifications. 111 people (17.3%) earned over $100,000 compared to 12.1% nationally. The employment status of those at least 15 was 363 (56.5%) full-time, 108 (16.8%) part-time, and 6 (0.9%) unemployed.

== Parks ==
Okitu Bush Scenic Reserve is a local conservation reserve and walking, owned and operated by the Department of Conservation.

Makorori Headland is a local walkway and cycleway, owned and operated by Gisborne District Council.
