= Repulsae Nescia =

Latin motto

Repulsae Nescia is a Latin phrase meaning "ignorant of defeat" in English. The longer phrase from Horace, Virtus Repulsae Nescia, is often translated as "courage knows no defeat".

== History ==
It is found in Horace: Odes, III., 2, 17. The following passage:

Virtus repulsae nescia sordidae
Intaminatis fulget honoribus,
Nec sumit aut ponit securis
Arbitrio popularis aurae.

was translated by Conington as:

True Virtue never knows defeat:
Her robes she keeps unsullied still;
Nor take, nor quits, her curule seat,
To please a people's veering will.

== Usage as a motto ==
- Rockport School in Craigavad, Holywood, N. Ireland, founded 1906
- Wofford College in Spartanburg, South Carolina, founded 1854 (formerly)
- Lasell University in Newton, Massachusetts, founded 1851
- Gisborne Boys' High School in Gisborne, New Zealand, founded 1909
- Gisborne Girls' High School in Gisborne, New Zealand, founded 1956

== See also ==
- List of mottos
- List of university mottos
