= Tuaheni Point =

Headland in New Zealand

- point
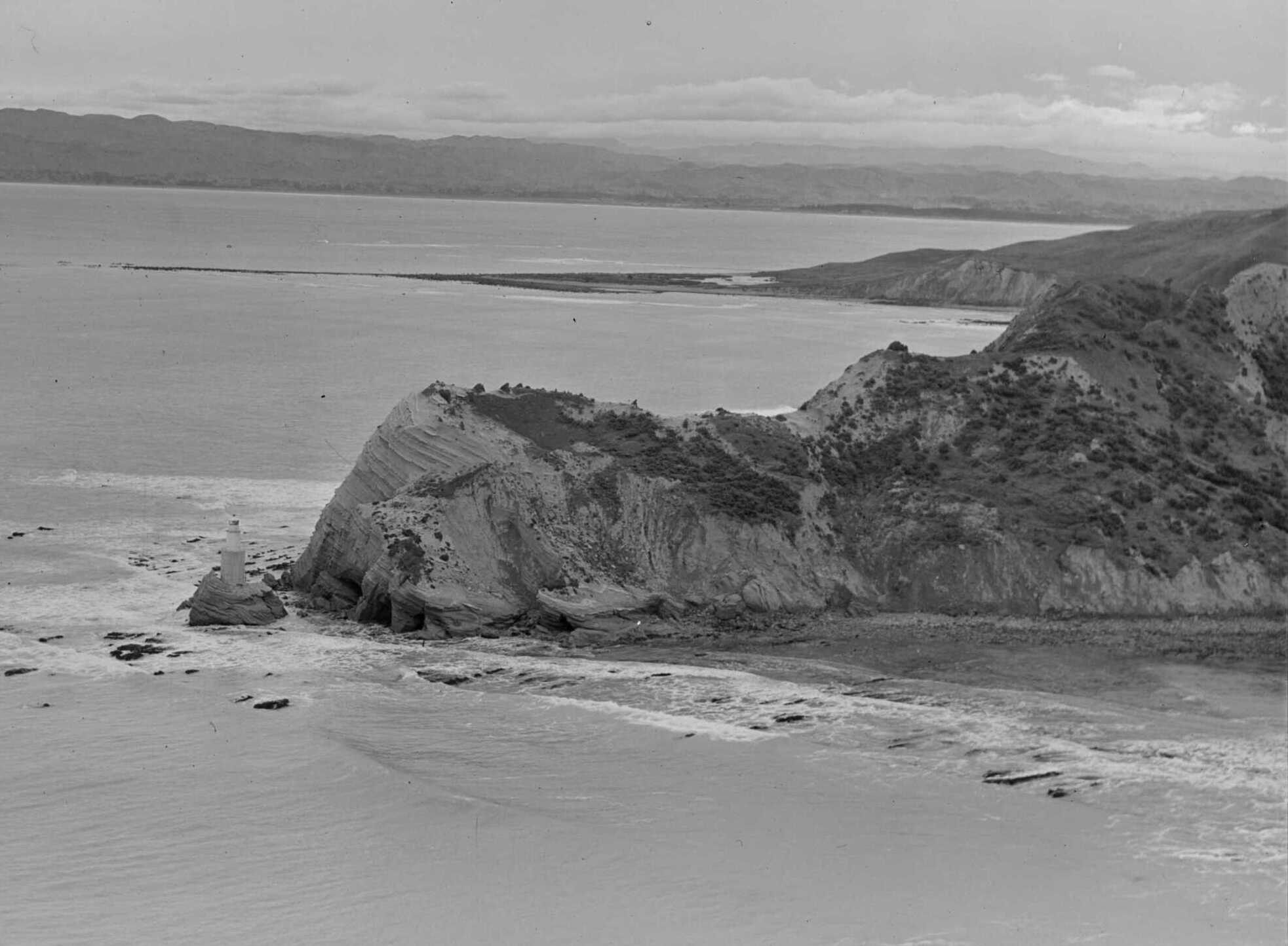
- Tuaheni Point seen from the east in 1949

- Location within New Zealand
- Coordinates: 38.708°S 178.069°E
- Location: Gisborne District, New Zealand
- Water bodies: Pacific Ocean

Tuahine Point is a promontory on the east coast of the North Island of New Zealand. It marks the northernmost point of Poverty Bay, and is located close to the city of Gisborne. The small settlements of Wainui Beach and Tamarau lie just to the north and northwest of Tuahine Point.

== See also ==
- List of rivers of New Zealand
