= Desna Whaanga-Schollum =

New Zealand artist

Desna Whaanga-Schollum is a New Zealand artist.

== Early life ==
Whaanga-Schollum was raised in Māhia and Wairoa, on the East Coast of New Zealand. Her mother is writer, illustrator and historian Mere Whaanga. Whaanga-Schollum is affiliated with Ngāti Rongomaiwahine, Ngāti Kahungunu and Ngāti Pāhauwera.

== Education ==
Whaanga-Schollum completed a Master of Science Communication in 2018 at Otago University. Her thesis is titled Taipōrutu, Taonga Tuku Iho. Articulating a Mātauranga Māori 'Sense of Place'. This work explores the philosophical and community values of mātauranga Māori, and considers how the science communication in this area might be improved within the context of resource management development processes. As part of her research, Whaanga-Schollum conducted a case study of Taipōrutu, her whānau farm on the East Coast of New Zealand.

== Career ==
Whaanga-Schollum is founding member and Chair of Ngā Aho (Māori Design Professionals Inc), which was founded to respond to the Urban Design Protocol released by the Ministry for the Environment in 2005. Ngā Aho aims to champion Māori design practitioners, and engages in advocacy and education work.

A memorandum of understanding between Ngā Aho and the New Zealand Institute of Architects was signed in 2015. This kawenata is a values-based agreement, and is based around five articles in the spirit of partnership under the mana of the Treaty of Waitangi.

Whaanga-Schollum has exhibited her artworks in both solo and group shows around New Zealand. She has a background in a wide range of mediums, and all her work is based in kaupapa Māori frameworks. She is one of the organisers of the annual Gifted Sands art exhibition in Mahia.

Whaanga-Schollum is Chair of the board for Artspace Aotearoa. She has written for a range of publications and presented at conferences and wānanga both in New Zealand and internationally. She was on the panel of judges for The Morgan Foundation's Make Me A Flag competition.
