= Gisborne Girls' High School =

Gisborne Girls High School

Location
- 555 Gladstone Road, Te Hapara, Gisborne, New Zealand; 38.6548°S 178.0086°E

Information
- Type: State Girls Secondary
- Motto: Virtus Repulsae Nescia
- Established: 1956
- Ministry of Education Institution no.: 210
- Principal: Bindy Hannah
- Enrolment: 701 (July 2026)
- Socio-economic decile: 3
- Website: gisbornegirlshigh.school.nz

Gisborne Girls High School is a girls' secondary school situated in Gisborne, New Zealand. It was founded in 1956 when Gisborne High School was split into two single-sex schools.

== History ==
Gisborne Girls High School celebrated its 50th Jubilee in 2006. The school was established as a separate institution in 1956. Previously girls had been educated at the Gisborne High School (est 1907) which was co-educational and the only secondary school in Gisborne at the time. Because of expansion after World War II, it was decided to split it into two separate schools. In 1956, the girls moved to new buildings on the present site to create Gisborne Girls High School, whilst the boys stayed on the original site and the school was renamed Gisborne Boys' High School.

The school's founding principal was Miss Florence Duff. Assemblies were held outdoors until the Assembly Hall was built in 1961. When Ayton House was no longer used as the boarding facility of the school, its dining rooms became the Student Centre, cafe and common rooms. Today part of that building is the modern Learning Support Centre.

== The Rectory ==
The Gisborne High Schools’ Hostel began life as two separate hostels. The Rectory, a hostel for Gisborne Boys High School was established in 1915 and Ayton House, a Girls High School Hostel in Stanley Road was built a few years later. In 1984 the Rectory was completely remodelled as a combined hostel for both schools. Ayton House was combined with The Rectory, to become a co-educational boarding facility just over a kilometre from the heart of Gisborne City. The Rectory accommodates up to 130 girls and boys attending Gisborne Girls’ High School and Gisborne Boys’ High School. Many of the boarders are international students from all over the world who are learning English through the special programmes offered by the two schools.

== Research ==
A research project in 1999 at the school identified changes that could make the difference between average and above average performance for Maori girls. Lisa Carmine, Liz Brown and Richard Ludlow embarked on the study after reading 1998 figures that indicated their school had a higher than average success rate with the qualifications achieved by Maori girls compared to schools of a similar decile rating. They decided to share their work through the Education Gazette, but note that their findings may be specific to Gisborne Girls' High School.

== Enrolment ==
As of July 2026, Gisborne Girls' High School has a roll of 701 students, of which 423 (60.3%) identify as Māori.

As of 2026, the school has an Equity Index of 488, placing it amongst schools whose students have above average socioeconomic barriers to achievement (roughly equivalent to decile 4 under the former socio-economic decile system).

== Principals ==
- F. Duff 1956–1973
- I. Bonbow 1973–1976
- G. Sharp 1976
- A. Dodds 1976–1985
- B. Pitkethley 1985–1996
- K. Johansen 1996–2008
- H. Gorrie 2008–2014
- J. Kumar 2015–2025
- B. Hannah 2026-

== Notable alumnae ==
- Jackie Clarke – actress, singer and former New Zealand Idol judge
- Amanda Gillies – 3 News reporter
- Michelle Hyland – Olympic cyclist 2004
- Areta Koopu – social worker and Māori activist
- Ethel McMillan (1904–1987) – Member of Parliament for Dunedin electorates (1953–1975)
- Dame Anne Salmond – historian
- Kiri Te Kanawa – opera singer
- Bronwyn Turei – actress and singer
- Mere Whaanga – writer, illustrator, historian, researcher and academic
- Chanel Whalley – singer and Australian Idol Top 10, 2004; attended 1991-1996
