= New Zealand studies =

New Zealand studies is the academic field of area studies of New Zealand. Māori studies is the academic field of cultural studies of the New Zealand Māori. The main New Zealand universities all have a School of Māori Studies.

On Waitangi Day in 2007, Birkbeck College London opened the first Centre for New Zealand Studies (CNZS) in the United Kingdom.

== Subfields ==
- History of New Zealand
- Literature of New Zealand
- Politics of New Zealand
- Economy of New Zealand
- Culture of New Zealand
- Māori culture
- Māori language
- Māori politics
- Māori religion

== Institutions ==
In New Zealand:

- Victoria University of Wellington, Stout Research Centre for New Zealand Studies

Overseas:

- Birkbeck, University of London, Centre for New Zealand Studies
- Peking University in Beijing (opened c. 2005, see Barry Gustafson)

== Academic journals ==
- Journal of New Zealand Studies of the Stout Research Centre (annual)
- Journal of New Zealand & Pacific Studies
- CNZS Bulletin of New Zealand Studies
- British Review of New Zealand Studies

== See also ==
- Education in New Zealand
- List of universities in New Zealand
