= Gisborne Boys' High School =

Location
- 80 Stanley Road; Gisborne, 4010; New Zealand; 38°39′33″S 178°00′38″E

Information
- Type: State secondary
- Motto: Latin: Virtus repulsae nescia (Courage knows no defeat)
- Established: 1909; 117 years ago
- Sister school: Gisborne Girls' High School
- Ministry of Education Institution no.: 209
- Principal: Tom Cairns
- Gender: Boys
- Enrolment: 797 (July 2026)
- Socio-economic decile: 3
- Website: www.gisboyshigh.net

Gisborne Boys' High School is a boys' secondary school situated in Gisborne, New Zealand. It was founded as a co-educational school in 1909 as Gisborne High School. In 1956, the school became Gisborne Boys' High School when it was split into two single-sex schools.

== History ==
=== Rectors / principals ===
The following is an incomplete list of the rectors and principals of Gisborne Boys' High School:

	Name	Term
1	Arthur Gatland	1909–1912
2	Frank Foote	1913–1931
3	James Hutton	1932–1943
4	James Leggatt	1943–1953
5	A J Gray	1953–1963
6	George Simpson	1964–1984
	Andrew Turner	2018–2022
	Tom Cairns	2022–present

== Sports ==
=== Rugby union ===
Gisborne High School's 1st XV rugby union team played its first game against Napier Boys' High School in 1911. Since then, the school has produced many notable rugby players including Hosea Gear and Rico Gear. The 1st XV has toured many countries competing in various competitions. The team played in the Sanix World Rugby Youth Invitational Tournament in Japan, reaching the semi-finals of the tournament before being beaten by Glenwood High School, who won the tournament.

Gisborne Boys' High School won the national secondary schools final in 2007, defeating Mount Albert Grammar School 36–24.

== Notable alumni ==
- Ron Bailey – politician
- Charles Chauvel – politician
- Craig Clarke – rugby union player
- Whetukamokamo Douglas – rugby union player
- Hosea Gear – rugby union player
- Rico Gear – rugby union player
- Jamison Gibson-Park – rugby union player
- Toa Halafihi – rugby union player
- Gareth Hughes – politician
- Witi Ihimaera – author
- Don Merton – conservationist
- Charlie Ngatai – rugby union player
- Ross Nicholson – association footballer
- Miah Nikora – rugby union player
- Maz Quinn – surfer
- Arnold Reedy – Māori leader
- Archibald Richardson – fighter pilot during the Second World War
- Grant Robinson – cricket player
- Blade Thomson – rugby union player
- Beaudein Waaka – rugby union player
- Tutekawa Wyllie – rugby union player and politician

== See also ==
- Gisborne Girls' High School
- List of schools in New Zealand
