= Te Waka Toi awards =

Creative New Zealand Māori arts awards

The Te Waka Toi awards are the premier awards in the field of ngā toi Māori (Māori arts). They have been awarded by Creative New Zealand and predecessors since 1986. The awards recognise tohunga (skilled people), artists and community leaders across all arts forms including visual and performing arts.

There are seven awards, including Te Tohu mō Te Arikinui Dame Te Atairangikaahu (Exemplary/Supreme Award), Ngā Tohu ā Tā Kingi Ihaka (Sir Kingi Ihaka Award), which recognises the recipient's lifetime contribution to Māori arts and Te Tohu Toi Kē a Te Waka Toi (Making a Difference Award).

== List of award recipients ==
=== Te Tohu mō Te Arikinui Dame Te Atairangikaahu | Exemplary/Supreme Award ===
Winners of Te Tohu mō Te Arikinui Dame Te Atairangikaahu, the exemplary / supreme award in 'recognition of leadership, excellence and outstanding contribution to Ngā Toi Māori'

- 2024 Aroha Yates-Smith - Te Arawa, Tainui
- 2023 Rangimoana Taylor - Ngāti Porou, Te Whānau ā Apanui
- 2022 Robin White - Ngāti Awa
- 2021 Rawiri Paratene - Ngā Puhi, Te Rarawa
- 2020 Robyn Kahukiwa - Ngāti Porou, Te Aitanga-a-Hauiti
- 2019 Rex Homan - Te Rarawa, Ngāti Pāoa, Te Atiawa
- 2018 Marilynn Webb - Ngāti Kahu, Te Roroa
- 2017 Fred Graham - Ngāti Korokī Kahukura, Tainui
- 2016 Patricia Grace - Ngāti Toa, Ngāti Raukawa
- 2015 Matekino Lawless - Ngāti Maniapoto, Ngāti Whawhakia
- 2014 Sandy Adsett - Ngāti Pāhauwera, Ngāti Kahungunu
- 2013 Darcy Nicholas - Te Ātiawa, Ngāti Ruanui, Tauranga Moana
- 2012 Tīmoti Kāretu - Ngāti Kahungunu, Ngāi Tūhoe
- 2011 Sidney Moko Mead - Ngāti Awa
- 2010 Kiri Te Kanawa - Ngāti Porou
- 2009 Witi Ihimaera - Te Aitanga-a-Māhaki Whānau a Kai
- 2008 Iritana Tawhiwhirangi - Ngāti Porou
- 2007 Howard Morrison - Te Arawa
- 2006 Diggeress Te Kanawa - Ngāti Maniapoto, Ngāti Kinohaku
- 2005 Don Selwyn - Ngāti Kurī, Te Aupōuri
- 2004 Te Ataairangikaahu - Tainui
- 2003 Cliff Whiting - Te Whānau-ā-Apanui
- 2002 Hirini Melbourne - Ngāi Tūhoe
- 2001 Katerina Te Heikoko Mataira - Ngāti Porou
- 2000 Rawinia Te Kani - Ngāti Porou
- 2000 Tokorua Te Kani - Ngāti Porou
- 1998 Jack Wihongi - Ngāpuhi
- 1997 Hinemoa Harrison - Ngāti Porou
- 1997 Pakariki Harrison - Ngāti Porou
- 1996 Hekenukumai Busby - Ngāpuhi
- 1995 Huirangi Waikerepuru - Ngāti Ruanui
- 1994 Rangimarie Hetet - Ngāti Maniapoto
- 1993 Nathanial Lees - Sāmoa
- 1992 Jim Moriarty - Ngāti Toa, Ngāti Koata
- 1991 Hone Tuwhare - Ngāpuhi
- 1990 Selwyn Muru - Ngāti Kurī
- 1989 Momoe Malietoa Von Reich - Sāmoa
- 1988 Ngapo Wehi - Whakatōhea
- 1987 Irirangi Tiakiawa - Te Arawa
- 1986 Te Aue Davis - Ngāti Maniapoto
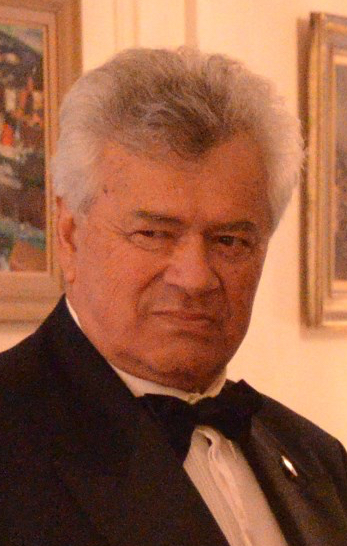
Cliff Whiting

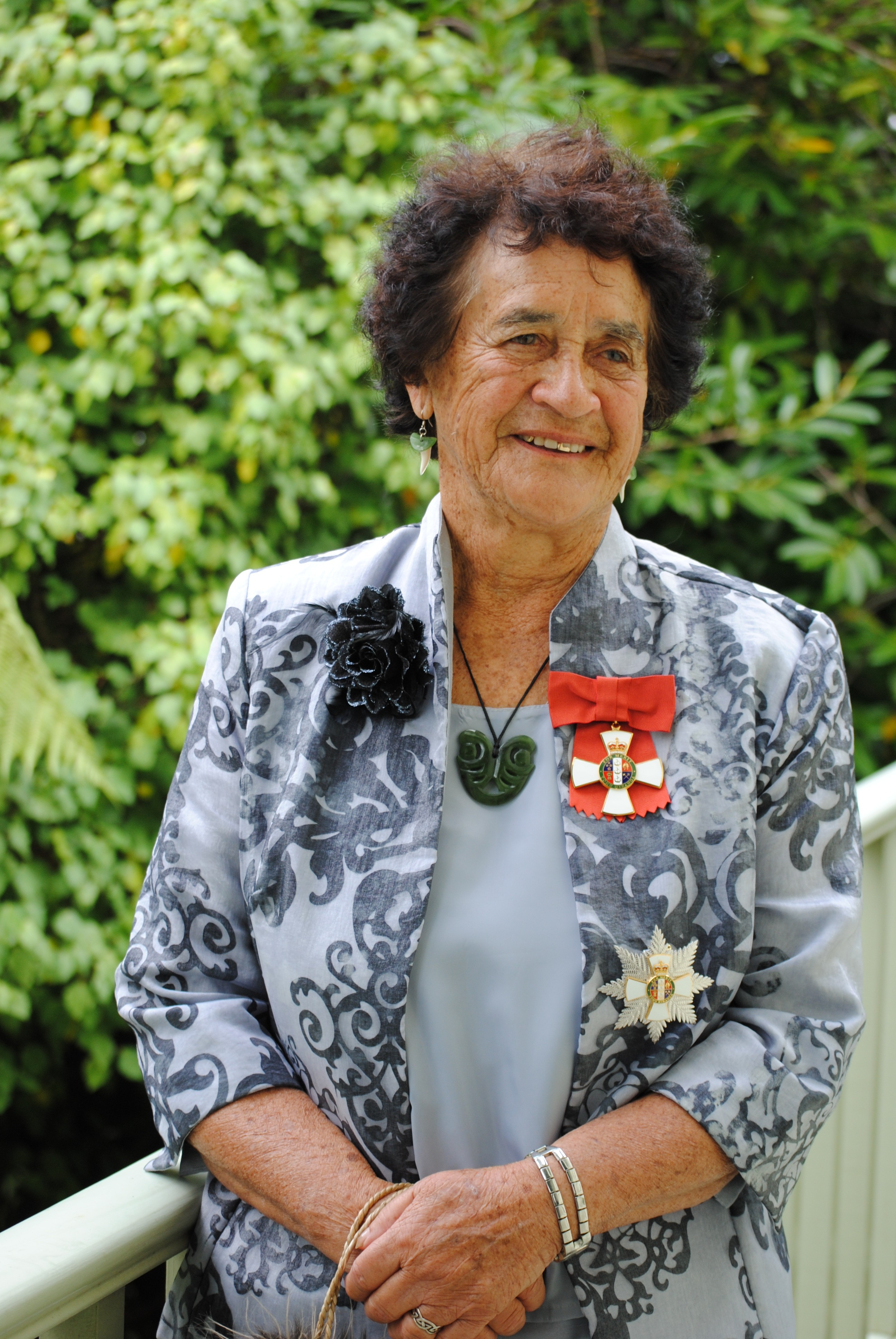
Iritana Tawhiwhirangi

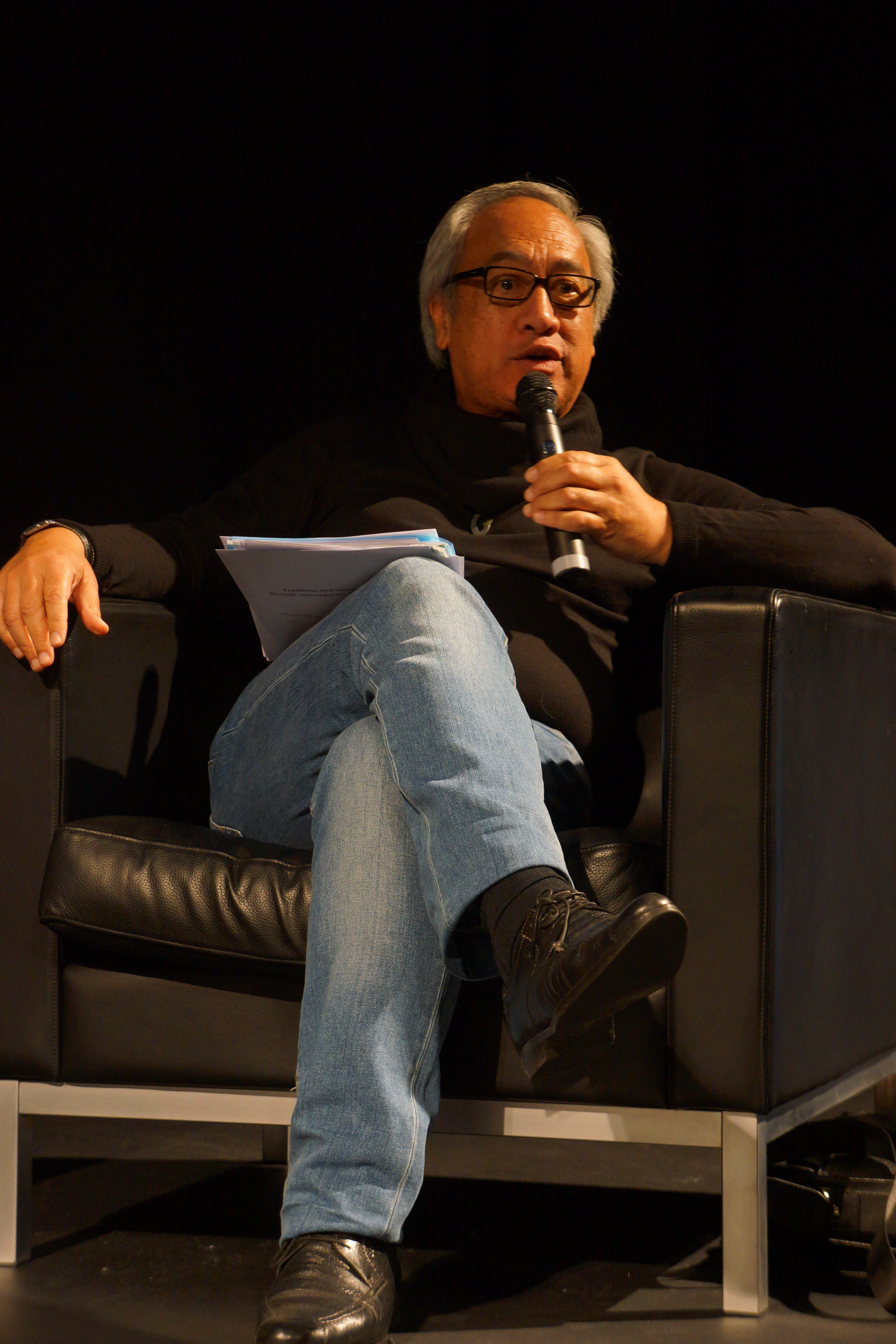
Witi Ihimaera

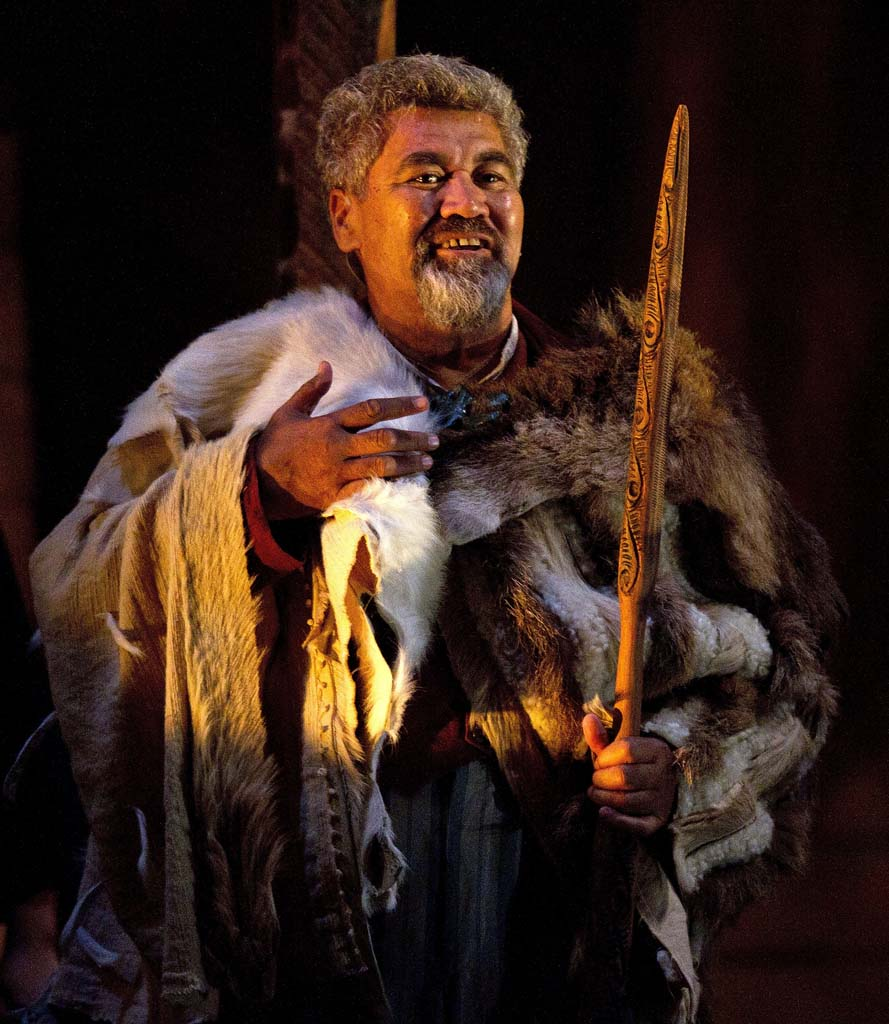
Rawiri Paratene in Hōhepa, 2012

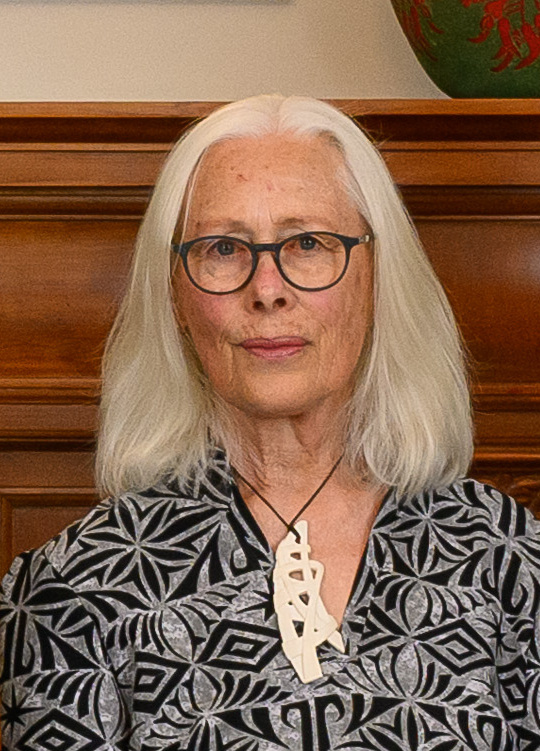
Robin White

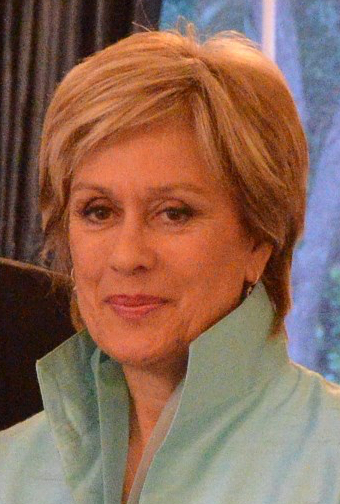
Kiri Te Kanawa

=== Ngā Tohu ā Tā Kingi Ihaka (Sir Kingi Ihaka Award) ===
The Sir Kingi Ihaka award is for kaumātua in 'recognition of their contribution to strengthening the continuity of Māori culture through their support of ngā Toi Māori'. Laureates since 2019:

- 2024 Ngahiwi Tomoana Ngāti Kahungunu/Ngāti Hawea, Ngāti Hori, Samoan
- 2024 Haami Te Whaiti Ngāti Kahungunu ki Wairarapa, Ngāi Tahu, Rangitāne
- 2023 Te Raina Ferris Ngāti Kahungunu, Ngāti Raukawa, Ngāti Māmoe, Kāi Tahu, Italy
- 2023 Horiana Tootell Ngāti Waewae, Ngāi Tahu
- 2022 Muriwai Ihakara Ngāti Porou, Te Arawa
- 2022 Christina Wirihana Ngāti Pikiao, Ngāti Maniapoto, Ngāti Raukawa, Ngāti Whawhakia, Te Arawa, Ngāti Rangiunora
- 2021 Gillian Whitehead Ngāi Te Rangi
- 2021 Haare Williams Te Aitanga-a-Māhaki, Tūhoe
- 2020 Whatarangi Winiata Ngāti Raukawa
- 2020 Gabrielle Rikihana Ngāti Raukawa
- 2019 John Klaricich Ngāpuhi
- 2019 Allen Wihongi Ngāpuhi
- 2019 Sonia Snowden Ngāpuhi
- 2019 Rim D. Paul Te Arawa
- 2019 Maureen Lander Ngāpuhi

=== Ngā Tohu Hautūtanga Auaha Toi | Making a Difference ===
- 2024 Julie Paama-Pengelly Ngāiterangi, Ngāi Tūwhiwhia, Ngāti Tauaiti, Ngāti Tapu
- 2024 James Thornton Webster Tainui: Ngāti Apakura, Ngāti Maniapoto, Ngāti Mahuta; Te Arawa: Ngati Pikiao; and Pākeha: Webster Clan
- 2024 Mataaho Collective
- 2023 Amber Curreen, Ngāpuhi
- 2023 Estella Hineratia Tawha-Davis Ngaati Maahanga, Waikato-Tainui, Ngaati Raukawa, Ngaati Maiotaki, Ngaati Toarangatira
- 2023 Graham Tipene Ngāti Whātua, Ngāti Kahu, Ngāti Haua, Ngāti Manu
- 2022 Veranoa Hetet, Te Atiawa, Ngāti Tūwharetoa, Ngāti Maniapoto
- 2022 Ross Hemara, Ngai Tahu
- 2022 Gabrielle Belz, Ngāpuhi, Te Atiawa
- 2021 Kereti Rautangata, Tainui, Te Arawa
- 2021 John Miller, Ngaitewake-ki-uta, Uritaniwha, Ngāti Rēhia (hapū of Ngāpuhi)
- 2021 Dolina Wehipeihana, Ngāti Raukawa, Ngāti Tukorehe
- 2020 Baye Riddell, Ngāti Porou
- 2020 Tanea Heke, Ngāpuhi Nui Tonu
- 2020 Tama Waipara, Ruapani, Rongowhakaata, Ngāti Porou
- 2019 Nancy Brunning, Ngāti Raukawa/Tūhoe
- 2018 Lyonel Grant, Ngāti Te Takinga, Ngāti Pikiao, Ngāti Rangiwewehi, Te Arawa
- 2017 Briar Grace-Smith, Ngāpuhi
- 2015 Lisa Reihana, MDes, BFA, Ngāpuhi, Ngāti Hine, Ngai Tu
- 2016 Hoturoa Barclay-Kerr, Tainui
- 2014 Professor Derek Lardelli, ONZM. Rongowhakaata, Ngāti Porou
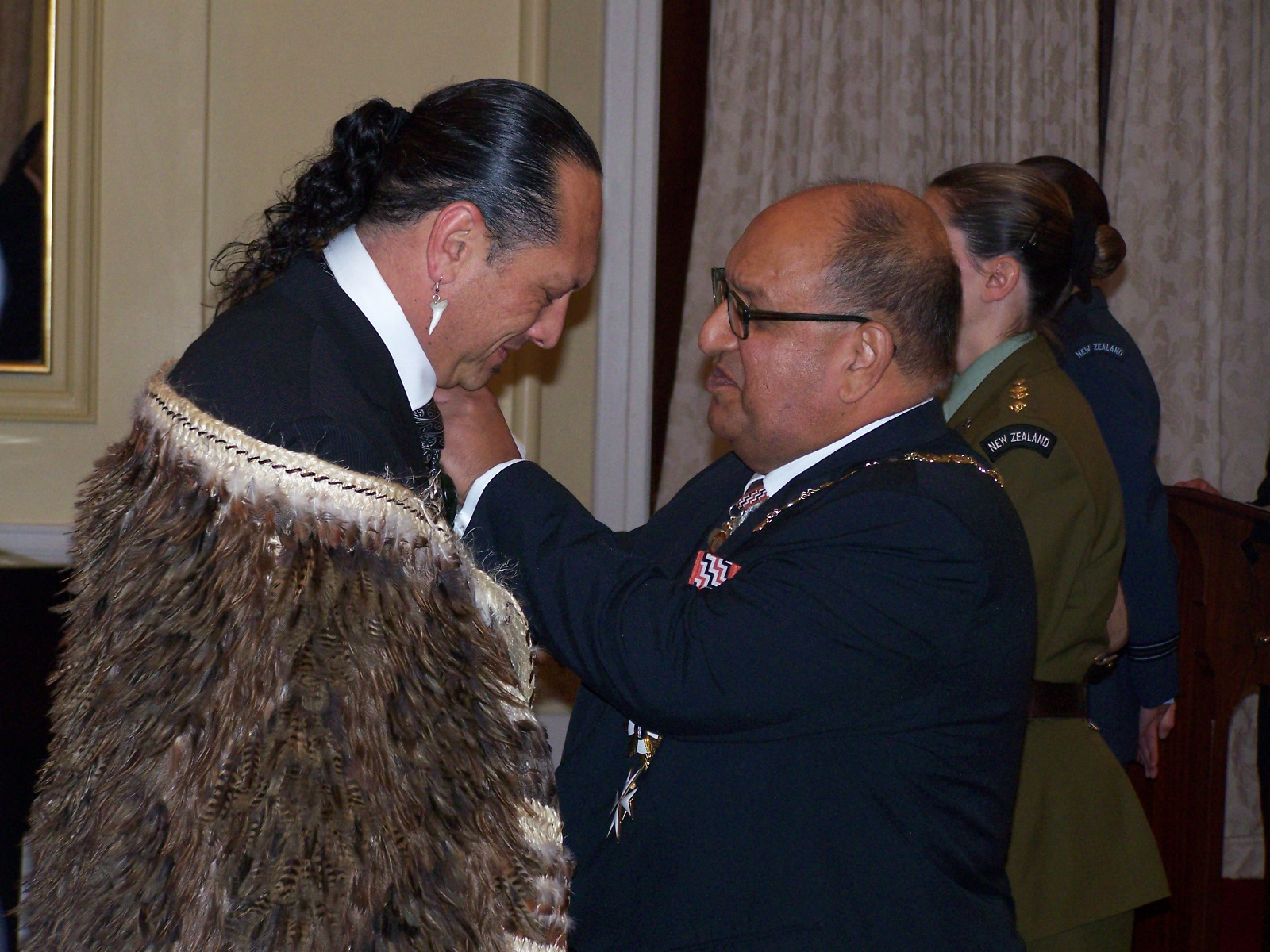
Derek Lardelli ONZM investiture

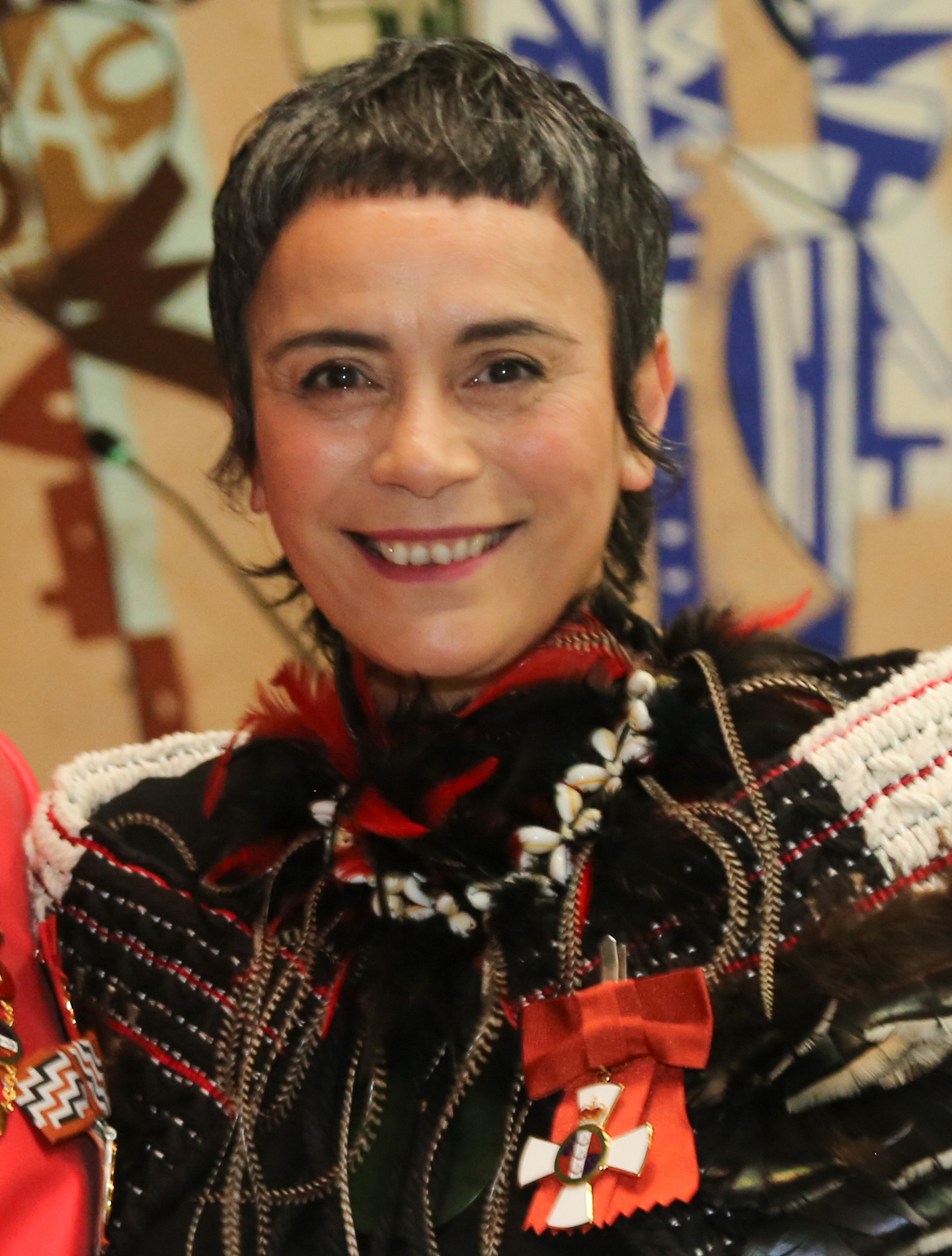
Lisa Reihana

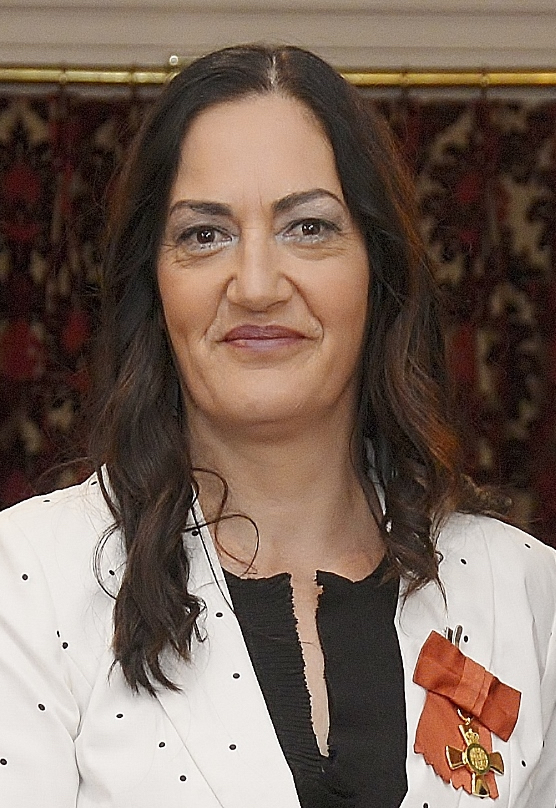
Briar Grace-Smith

=== Te Tohu aroha mō Ngoi Kumeroa Pewhairangi: “Whakarongo, Titiro, Kōrero” | Award for strengthening Te Reo Rangatira ===
- 2024 Tweedie Waititi Te Whānau-ā-Apanui, Rongowhakaata
- 2023 Mr G (Graham Hoete), Ngāi Te Rangi, Ngāti Ranginui, Ngāti Awa
- 2022 Rob Ruha, Te Whānau-ā-Apanui, Ngāti Porou, Ngāti Rangiteaorere, Tūhourangi
- 2021 Dame Hinewehi Mohi, Ngāti Kahungunu, Tūhoe
- 2020 Pere Wihongi, Ngāpuhi Nui Tonu
- 2019 Derek Lardelli, Ngāti Porou, Rongowhakaata, Ngāti Konohi (Ngai Te Riwai), Ngāti Kaipoho (Ngai Te Aweawe)
- 2018 Kuini Moehau Reedy, MNZM. Ngāti Porou
- 2017 Pembroke Peraniko Bird, Ngāti Manawa, Ngāti Tahu
- 2016 Mana Elizabeth (Liz) Hunkin, Ngāti Kahungunu
- 2015 Rahera Wiremu Shortland, Ngāpuhi
- 2014 Dr Apirana Tuahae Kaukapakapa Mahuika, Ngāti Porou
- 2013 Dr Patu Hohepa, Ngāpuhi, Te Ātiawa
- 2012 Professor Pou Tēmara, Ngāi Tūhoe

=== Ngā Manu Pīrere | Award to recognise emerging Māori artists ===
- 2024 Purewa Hohi Hodge Taranaki, Ngāti Tama-rongo, Muaūpoko
- 2024 Rangipo Ihakara Ngāti Pikiao, Ngāti Tuwharetoa, Ngāti Porou, Ngāti Kuri, Akatokamanava: Mauke Island; Araura Enua: Aitutaki Island
- 2024 Jade Hohaia Te Uri Karaka Raukawa, Waikato, Ngā Puhi, Ngāi Tahu
- 2023 Brianne Te Paa Ngāti Kahu, Ngāpuhi, Te Rarawa, Ngāti Whātua, Ngāti Tūwharetoa, Te Aitanga-a-Māhaki, Te Whānau-a-Apanui
- 2023 Bridy Lundon Ngāpuhi, Waikato-Tainui
- 2023 Tuakoi Ohia Ngāi Te Rangi, Ngāti Pūkenga, Ngāti Hine, Te Ati Awa, Tainui, Te Arawa, Ngāti Pākehā
- 2022 Ngamoko Rota Waikato, Ngaati Mahuta
- 2022 Ming Ranginui Te Ati Haunui-a-Pāpārangi
- 2022 p.A Ngāti Kuri
- 2021 Maia Keane, Ngai Tāmanuhiri, Rongowhakaata
- 2021 Te Haana Paewai, Rangitāne, Ngāruahine
- 2021 Te Huamanuka Luiten-Apirana, Ngāti Hikairo, Tainui, Tūhoe, Ngāti Whakaue
- 2020 Ngā Hine Pūkōrero – Arihia Hall, Te Arawa, Ngāti Tuwharetoa, Ngāti Tukorehe
- 2020 Ngā Hine Pūkōrero – Terina Wichman-Evans, Ngāpuhi, Ngāti Whātua, Te Aupouri
- 2020 Ngā Hine Pūkōrero – Manaia Tuwhare-Hoani
- 2020 Ngā Hine Pūkōrero – Matariki Bennett, Te Arawa
- 2020 Ashleigh Taupaki, Ngāti Hako
- 2020 Amy Rameka, Ngāti Tuwharetoa, Ngāti Maniapoto
- 2019 Ashley (Hine) Waitai-Dye – Ngāti Kuri
- 2019 Cian Gardner – Ngāpuhi
- 2018 Nerys Catrin Ngaruhe,Ngāti Kahungunu
- 2018 Isaac James Te Reina, Ngāti Raukawa, Ngati Kapumanawawhiti
- 2017 Chevron Te-Whetumatarau Hassett, Ngāti Porou, Ngāti Kahungunu, Rongomaiwahine
- 2017 Turene Huiarau Jones, Rongowhakaata, Ngāti Whakaue
- 2016 Te Kanawa Ngarotata, Ngāti Porou, Ngāti Maniapoto
- 2016 Cori Masters, Te Arawa, Ngati Whakaue, Te Whakatō
- 2015 Mapihi Maureen Te Rerehau Kelland. Ngāti Tūwharetoa, Ngāti Kahungunu
- 2015 Hana-lee Kereru-Wainohu. Ngāti Kahungunu, Rongomaiwahine
- 2014 Te Utanga-ki-Whangaparaoa Tautuhi, Ngāti Ranginui, Ngai-te-rangi, Ngāti Raukawa, Ngāti Porou
- 2014 Chloe Rose Cull, Kāi Tahu
- 2013 Damen Joe, Waikato/Tainui
- 2013 Deane-Rose Marie Ngatai, Ngāti Porou

=== Te Tohu o Te Papa Tongarewa Rongomaraeroa | Outstanding contribution to Ngā Toi Māori ===
This outstanding contribution award of $5,000 is funded and selected by staff at Te Papa.

- 2024 Ngahuia Te Awekotuku Te Arawa, Tūhoe, Waikato
- 2023 Putiputi Mackey Ngāti Porou ki Pōneke (posthumously awarded)
- 2022 Hoturoa Barclay-Kerr, Tainui
- 2022 Jack Thatcher, Ngāi Te Rangi, Ngāti Ranginui, Ngāti Porou, Te Aitanga-a-Hauiti
- 2022 Stanley Conrad, Te Aupouri
- 2021 Hokimoana Te Rika-Hererangi, Tūhoe
- 2020 Bob Jahnke, Ngāti Porou
- 2019 Kura Te Waru Rewiri, Ngāti Kahu, Ngāpuhi, Ngāti Kauwhata, Ngāti Rangi
- 2018 Sandy Adsett MNZM, MMVA, Pahauwera/Ngāti Kahungunu (2018)
- 2017 Dr Cliff Whiting, ONZ, Te Whānau-ā-Apanui

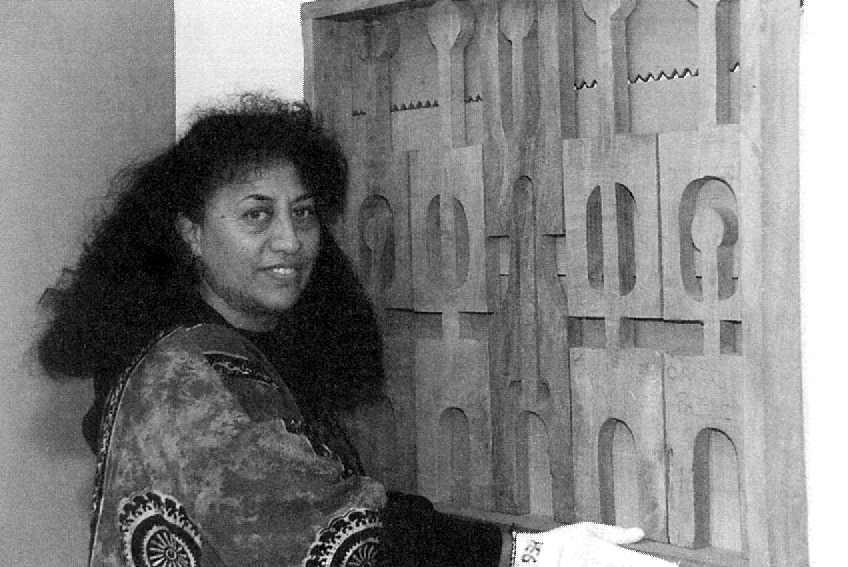

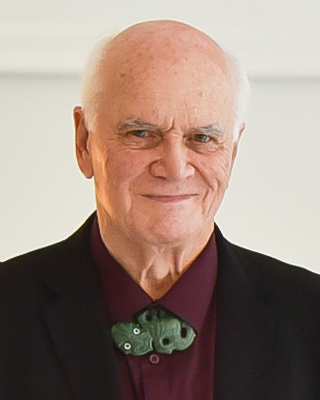

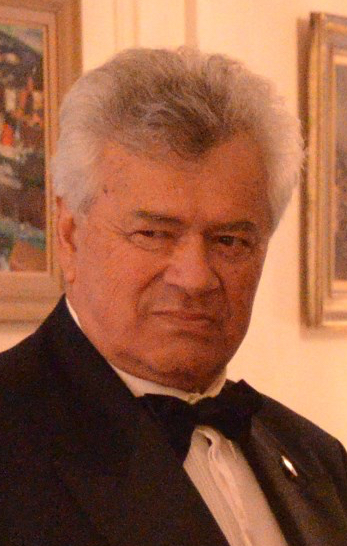

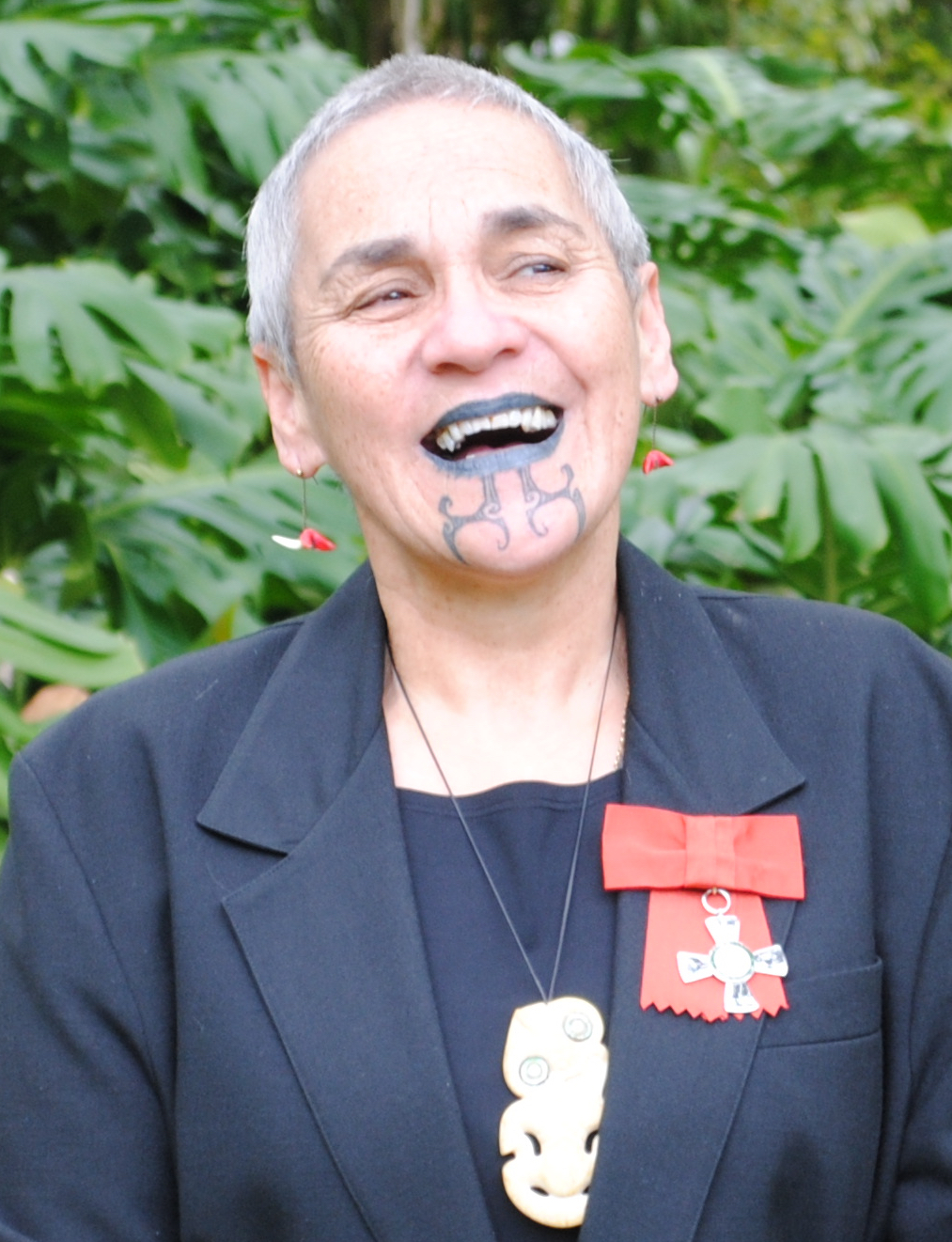

=== Te Tohu Whakamanawa o Te Matatini | Recognising outstanding contribution to Kapa Haka ===
These awards have a prize $7,500 and are funded and selected by Te Matatini Kapa Haka Aotearoa.

- 2024 Chris Henare Ngāti Kahu/Te Whānau-ā-Apanui/Ngāti Porou
- 2024 Sandra Henare Ngāti Kurī/Te Arawa
- 2023 Ngamoni Huata Tūhourangi-Ngāti Wahiao, Ngāti Whare, Ngāi Tuhoe, Te Whakatōhea, Ngāti Raukawa
- 2022 Te Taepa Kameta Ngāti Pikiao, Ngāti Rangiunuora, Te Arawa, Te Whakatōhea, Taranaki
- 2022 Te Aroha Paenga Ngāti Porou, Ngāti Kahungunu, Tainui
- 2021 Tangiwai Ria Te Aitanga-a-Māhaki
- 2021 Trevor Maxwell Ngāti Rangiwewehi, Te Arawa
- 2020 Tihi Puanaki, Ngāti Hine (2020)
- 2019 Wetini Mitai-Ngatai – Te Arawa, Te Whakatohea
- 2018 Kuini Moehau Reedy, MNZM. Ngāti Porou
- 2018 Tā Pita Sharples KNZM, CBE, Ngāti Kahungunu
- 2017 Louise Kingi, Te Aitanga-a-Māhaki
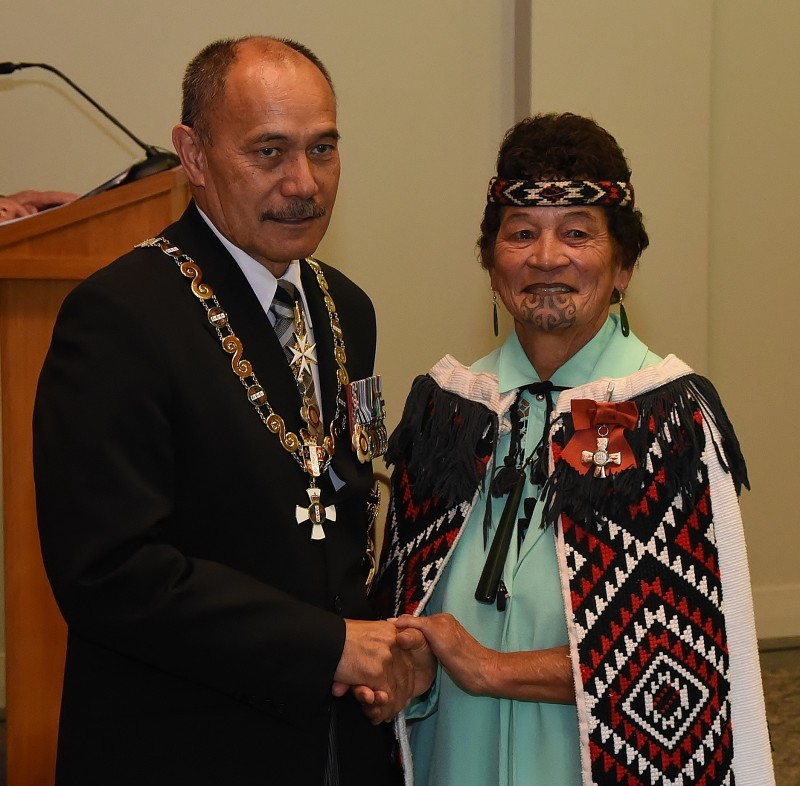
Te Aroha Paenga, Investiture 2016

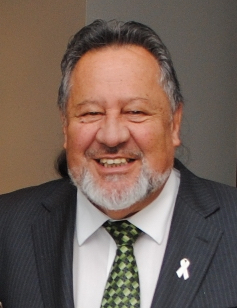

=== Te Tohu Iho Pūmanawa | Recognises the contribution of a Māori artist with the lived experience of disability ===
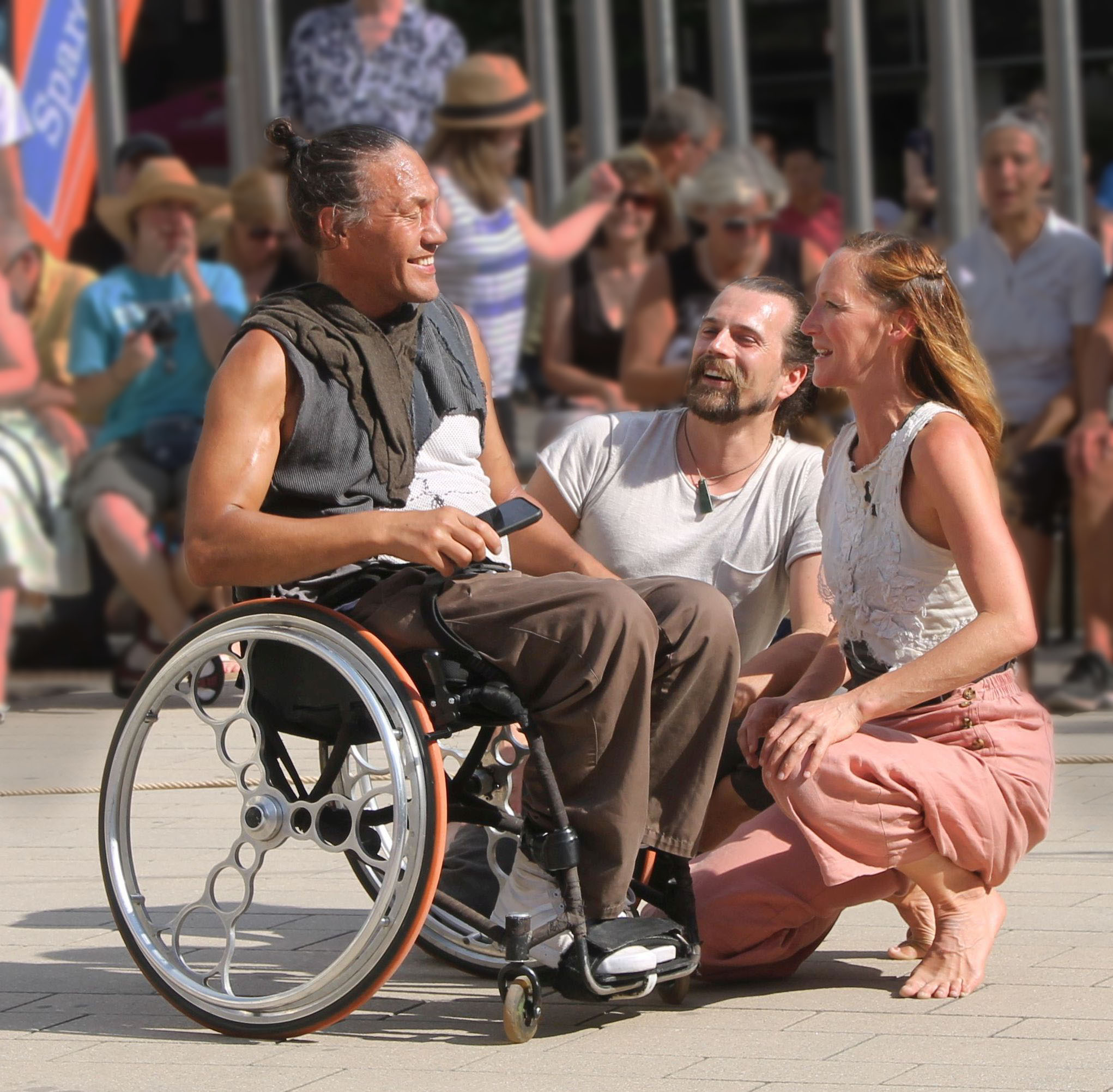
Rodney Bell and others

- 2024 Rāhera Turner Waikato/Tainui, Ngāti Mahuta, Te Patupō, Ngāti Tūwharetoa
- 2022 Anaru Ruka Ngāpuhi, Ngāti Raukawa, Ngāti Tuwharetoa
- 2021 Cara Waretini Ngāti Rangi, Te Āti Haunui-a-Pāpārangi, Ngāti Rongomaiwahine, Ngāti Pākehā
- 2020 Rodney Bell Ngāti Maniapoto

=== Te Māori Award | Recognising Leadership in the Development of the Te Māori Exhibition ===
Supported by Te Māori Manaaki Taonga Trust

- Kara Puketapu, Te Atiawa (2019)

=== Manaaki Taonga Award | Recognising the work of a Māori Artist who fulfils the legacy of Te Māori ‘He Taonga Tuku Iho’ ===
Supported by Te Māori Manaaki Taonga Trust

- Lewis Gardiner, Te Arawa, Ngāti Awa, Whanau a Apanui, Ngāi Tahu (2019)
