= Pat Rosier =

New Zealand writer, editor and feminist activist

- Born: Patricia Jean Rosier; 21 January 1942; Auckland, New Zealand
- Died: 12 June 2014 (aged 72); Paekākāriki, New Zealand
- Education: University of Auckland
- Occupations: Writer, feminist activist

Patricia Jean Rosier (21 January 1942 – 12 June 2014) was a New Zealand writer, editor and feminist activist. Born and educated in Auckland into a working-class family, after marriage and raising two children she came out as a lesbian in the 1980s and went on to play a leading role in the second wave of New Zealand's Women's Movement, including editing Broadsheet for six years. In her later years she lived with Prue Hyman in Paekākāriki, north of Wellington.

== Works ==
=== Non-fiction ===
- Broadsheet Editor (1986 to 1992)
- Broadsheet, twenty years of Broadsheet Magazine selected and introduced by Pat Rosier. 1992. New Women's Press, Auckland, NZ. ISBN 0908652682
- Get used to it!: children of gay and lesbian parents Pat Rosier and Myra Hauschild, Canterbury University Press, 1999. ISBN 0908812868
- Women's studies: conference papers 1982 Hilary Lapsley, Pat Rosier, Claire-Louise McCurdy and Candis Craven, 1982.
- The 14th Conference of the Women's Studies Association (N.Z.) : "Raranga wahine" Editing by Pat Rosier. 1988.
- Workwise: a guide to managing workplace relationships Pat Rosier, Canterbury University Press, 2001. ISBN 1877257060
- No body's perfect: a self-help book for women who have problems with food Jasbindar Singh and Pat Rosier New Women's Press, 1989. ISBN 0908652461
- No body's perfect: dealing with food problems Jasbindar Singh and Pat Rosier, Attic Press, 1990. ISBN 1855940078
- Lesbians in front, up front, out front Pat Rosier, book chapter in Heading nowhere in a navy blue suit: and other tales from the feminist revolution Susan Jane Kedgley and Mary Varnham Daphne Brasell Associates Press, 1993. ISBN 0908896301
- Women's studies tutor kit Candis Crave, Margot Roth, Claire-Louise McCurdy and Pat Rosier, Auckland Workers' Educational Association, Women's Studies Sub-Committee, 1983.
- Women and Education Pat Rosier chapter in Perspectives on women today : lecture series, Term I, 1986.

=== Fiction ===
- Poppy's return Pat Rosier, Spinifex, 2004 ISBN 9781742191560
- Poppy's progress Pat Rosier, Spinifex, 2002 ISBN 1742191525
- Stones gathered together : a collection of stories and thoughts Pat Rosier, Smashwords, 2012. ISBN 1301009016
- Take it easy Pat Rosier, Smashwords, 2008. ISBN 0473130556
- Where the heArt is Pat Rosier, Smashwords, 2013. ISBN 0473237415
