= Broadsheet (magazine) =

New Zealand feminist magazine, 1972–1997

- Broadsheet magazine cover from June 1985
- Frequency: Monthly
- Founder: Anne Else and Sandra Coney
- First issue: July 1972
- Final issue: 1997
- Country: New Zealand
- Based in: Auckland

Broadsheet was a monthly New Zealand feminist magazine produced in Auckland from 1972 to 1997. The magazine played a significant part in New Zealand women's activism. It was to become one of the world's longest-lived feminist magazines.

== History ==
It was co-founded by Anne Else, Sandra Coney, Rosemary Ronald, and Kitty Wishart. The magazine was "New Zealand's first feminist magazine focusing on women's issues and information sharing on a national and international level". Topics covered included abortion rights, contraception, marriage, equal pay, sexism in education, childrearing and women's liberation activities. The magazine had Māori and Pasifika contributors, as well as a focus on lesbianism and lesbian writers.

The first issue was released in July 1972, and "consisted of twelve foolscap pages – stapled"; 200 copies were produced, which sold out. Before the second issue was published they had 50 paid subscribers. In addition to subscriptions, early issues of Broadsheet were taken out in public to meetings and pubs to sell.

Māori issues sometimes received considerable coverage in the magazine, which provoked "fierce exchanges in the letters pages".

The magazine was also at the forefront of raising awareness about violence against women and sexual harassment, long before they became general social concerns.

When it was first founded, the magazine welcomed anyone wanting to work on Broadsheet, but this soon resulted in difficulties as members clashed over differing goals for the magazine. This changed in 1975 when the magazine transitioned into a closed collective model where those who had already demonstrated their commitment made decisions through consensus and invited other committed workers into the collective. The closed collective model continued into the 1990s.

On 19 September 1992, the magazine and New Women's Press (NWP) celebrated a joint anniversary (Broadsheet's twentieth and NWP's tenth), with a Suffrage Day event in Auckland, attended by more than 200 women. The event was part of the Listener Women's Book Festival. Speakers included Pat Rosier, Sandra Coney, Wendy Harrex, Stephanie Johnson and Sheridan Keith.

The magazine is now an important source for the social history of the period, and the entire back catalogue of Broadsheet is available on the University of Auckland website.
