= New Women's Press =

New Zealand feminist press (1982-1994)

New Women's Press (NWP) was an independent book publisher founded in Auckland, New Zealand in 1982. New Women's Press's mandate was to publish books "by, for, and about women". Wendy Harrex ran New Women's Press for 11 years. Over that time, NWP published over 70 titles of non-fiction, fiction and poetry, as well as an annual diary, Herstory, that highlighted groups of New Zealand women. The Haeata Collective of Māori women artists was originally founded to produce a Herstory edition for NWP. NWP also published the first anthology of New Zealand women's fiction, which was edited by Cathie Dunsford.

The Broadsheet feminist magazine and NWP celebrated a joint anniversary (Broadsheet's twentieth and NWP's tenth) on 19 September 1992, with a Suffrage Day event in Auckland, attended by more than 200 women. The event was part of the Listener Women's Book Festival, and was also the launch of Been Around for Quite a While. Speakers included Pat Rosier, Sandra Coney, Wendy Harrex, Stephanie Johnson and Sheridan Keith.

In an article surveying the state of women's publishing in New Zealand, Laurel Bergmann describes New Women's Press as "an important part of the process of legitimation of women fiction writers", particularly due to the New Women's Fiction anthology series that provided opportunities to new writers to publish alongside established voices. Janet Wilson has noted that this anthology series "confirmed the development of a new market and readership" for writing by women.

== List of publications ==
Title	Author / editors	Series	Year of publication	ISBN
New Women's Calendar 1982			1981	
Healthy Women: A self-help guide to good health	Sarah Calvert		1982	0 908652 00 3
New Zealand Herstory 1983	Hamilton Women's Collective	Herstory	1982	0 908652 01 1
Born Beneath a Rainbow: Memories of a country childhood	Judith Ellmers		1983	0 908652 02 X
Self Defence for Women	Sue Lytollis		1983	0 908652 03 8
New Zealand Herstory 1984		Herstory	1983	
Nest in a Falling Tree	Joy Cowley	New Women's Classics	1984	0 908652 08 9
The Love Contract	Margaret Sutherland	New Women's Classics	1984	0 908652 10 0
Dragon Rampant	Robin Hyde	New Women's Classics	1984	0 908652 07 0
Deep Breathing	Lora Mountjoy		1984	0 908652 13 5
Haeata Herstory 1985	Haeata Herstory Collective	Herstory	1984	0 908652 12 7
Women's Studies: A New Zealand Handbook	Candis Craven, Claire-Louise McCurdy, Pat Rosier & Margot Roth		1985	0 908652 15 1
Recipes My Mother Taught Me	Reinza Goldwater		1985	0 908652 14 3
Herstory 1986	Rural Women's Network	Herstory	1985	0 908652 16 X
Save the Midwife	Joan Donley		1986	0 908652 05 4
Self Defence for Women	Sue Lyttolis	Reprint	1986	0 908652 03 8
New Women's Fiction	Cathie Dunsford (editor)	New Women's Fiction	1986	0 908652 18 6
The Daughter-in-Law and Other Stories	Frances Cherry		1986	0 908652 19 4
The Old-Time Maori	Makereti	New Women's Classics	1986	0 908652 11 9
Nor the Years Condemn	Robin Hyde	New Women's Classics	1986	0 908652 09 7
Peace is More than the Absence	Gil Hanly, Sonja Davies		1986	0 908652 23 5
Herstory 1987	Herstory '87 Collective	Herstory	1986	0 908652 21 6
Candles and Canvas: A Danish Family in New Zealand	Poula Langkilde-Christie		1987	0 908652 22 4
Twenty-Eight Days in Kiribati	Claudia Pond Eyley and Robin White		1987	0 908652 24 0
Feet Across America	Anne Macfarlane		1987	0 908652 25 9
2 Deaths in 1 Night	Janet Charman		1987	0 908652 27 5
Poorman Oranges: Women in community houses in Auckland	Wensley Willcox		1987	0 908652 29 1
Herstory 1988: Women & Books	New Women's Press	Herstory	1987	0 908652 28 3
New Women's Fiction 2	Aorewa McLeod (editor)	New Women's Fiction	1988	0 908652 30 5
The Glass Whittler: Short Stories	Stephanie Johnson		1988	0 908652 33 X
Tai: Heart of a Tree	Momoe Malietoa von Reiche		1988	0 908652 36 4
Guts, Tears & Glory: Champion New Zealand Sportswomen talk to Trish Stratford	Trish Stratford		1988	0 908652 31 3
Herstory 1989 (on women in sport)	Lisa Hayes & Clare Simpson	Herstory	1988	0 908652 34 8
Healing Your Child	Frances & Louise Darragh		1989	0 908652 26 7
Premenstrual Syndrome	Helen Duckworth	New Women's Handbook Series	1989	0 908652 44 5
No Body’s Perfect: A self-help book for women who have problems with food	Jasbindar Singh & Pat Rosier	New Women's Handbook Series	1989	0 908652 46 1
Wednesday’s Children	Robin Hyde	New Women's Classics	1989	0 908652 37 2
New Women's Fiction 3	Mary Paul & Marion Rae	New Women's Fiction	1989	0 908652 43 7
The Wintering House	Alexandria Chalmers	New Women's Fiction	1989	0 908652 40 2
One Plain, One Purl: Stories of a Girlhood	Carin Svensson	New Women's Fiction	1989	0 908652 41 0
Tahuri	Ngahuia Te Awekotuku	New Women's Fiction	1989	0 908652 42 9
Dancing with Strings	Frances Cherry	New Women's Fiction	1989	0 908652 32 1
To Be So Old	Gwen Skinner		1990	0 908652 47 X
The Exploding Frangipani: Lesbian writing from Australia & NZ	Cathie Dunsford & Susan Hawthorne		1990	0 908652 51 8
Home Away from Home	Manying Ip		1990	0 908652 45 3
Victoria in Maoriland	Margaret Blay	New Women's Fiction	1990	0 908652 50 X
Self Defence for Women	Sue Lytollis	Reprint	1990	0 908652 03 8
Premenstrual Syndrome	Helen Duckworth	Attic Press Edition	1990	0 946211 67 1
No Body’s Perfect: A self-help book for women who have problems with food	Jasbindar Singh & Pat Rosier	Attic Press Edition	1990	1 85594 007 8
Women in Mid-Life	Leteia Potter	New Women's Handbook Series	1991	0 908652 53 4
Parker & Hulme: A Lesbian View	Julie Glamuzina & Alison Laurie		1991	0 908652 54 2
Sailing Away: New Zealand Women in Sailing 1920-1990	Jann Iorns		1991	0 908652 57 7
Mana Wahine Maori: Selected writings on Maori women's art, culture and politics	Ngahuia Te Awekotuku		1991	0 908652 63 1
New Women's Fiction 4	Wendy Harrex & Lynsey Ferrari	New Women's Fiction	1991	0 908652 64 8
The Widowhood of Jacki Bates	Frances Cherry	New Women's Fiction	1991	0 908652 61 5
Shallow are the Smiles at the Supermarket	Sheridan Keith	New Women's Fiction	1991	0 908652 58 5
An Unusually Clumsy Lover	Carin Svensson	New Women's Fiction	1991	0 908652 60 7
Animal Passions	Sheridan Keith		1992	0 908652 66 6
Crimes of Neglect	Stephanie Johnson		1992	0 908652 65 8
The Woman Question: Writings by the women who won the vote	Selected by Margaret Lovell-Smith		1992	0 908652 67 4
Broadsheet: Twenty Years of Broadsheet Magazine	Pat Rosier (editor)		1992	0 908652 68 2
Invisible Families: A resource for Family and friends of lesbian or gay daughters and sons	Terry Stewart		1993	0 908652 69 0
Healing Your Child	Frances & Louise Darragh	reprint	1994	0 908652 26 7
