= Kay Morris Matthews =

New Zealand educator (born 1951)

- Born: 1951
- Other name: Alison Kay Morris Matthews
- Relatives: Joanne Morris (sister)

Academic background
- Education: University of Waikato
- Thesis: Henry Hill – Frontier Inspector (1984)
- Academic advisor: Ian Andrew McLaren

Academic work
- Institutions: Eastern Institute of Technology, Victoria University of Wellington
- Doctoral students: Anne Else, Alice Pollard

Alison Kay Morris Matthews JP is a New Zealand academic education researcher, and is emeritus professor at the Eastern Institute of Technology, specialising in community history, education, and women and children's issues.

== Academic career ==
Morris Matthews was born in Hamilton, and was educated at Dannevirke High School and Colenso High School (now William Colenso College) in Napier. Her sister is lawyer Joanne Morris. She earned a Bachelor of Education and a Master of Education at the University of Waikato. Her master's thesis was titled Henry Hill – Frontier Inspector at the University of Waikato. Morris Matthews worked as a secondary school teacher and then lectured in women's studies at the University of Waikato. She then joined the faculty of the University of Auckland and Victoria University of Wellington where she was Professor of Education. Morris Matthews then moved to the Eastern Institute of Technology as Research Professor. She served on the national executive of the New Zealand Council for Research in Education, and has been a justice of the peace since 1985.

Morris Matthews' research focus is on children and women's issues, and she has written more than seven books, covering subjects such as Māori girls' education, and modern education policy in New Zealand. She wrote an exhibition Recovery: Women's Overseas Service for WWI for the commemoration of the centenary of the First World War, which highlighted the stories of East Coast women who served overseas. The exhibition was displayed at Tairawhiti Museum in 2017, and Morris Matthews wrote the accompanying book. Notable doctoral students of Morris Matthews include Anne Else and Alice Pollard.

On her retirement from the Eastern Institute of Technology in 2021, Morris Matthews was appointed emeritus professor. She still continued her research, and when she volunteered at the MTG Hawke's Bay, she was appointed researcher in residence. Morris Matthews wrote the exhibition For Home and Country: Women’s Institutes in Hawke’s Bay, which was shown at MTG Hawke's Bay in 2021, to celebrate the centenary of the founding of Women's Institutes in New Zealand. The exhibition also marked the re-opening of the museum after its closure. Morris Matthew published a biography of WI founder Bessie Spencer

== Selected works ==
=== Books ===
- Olssen, Mark; Morris Matthews, Kay, eds. (1997). Education policy in New Zealand: the 1990s and beyond. Palmerston North, New Zealand: Dunmore Press. ISBN 086469296X. OL 422878M.
- Morris Matthews, Kay; Johnston, Jean, eds. (2015). First to See the Light: EIT 40 years of higher education. Napier, New Zealand: Eastern Institute of Technology. ISBN 9780994127402.
- Jenkins, Kuni; Morris Matthews, Kay (1995). Hukarere and the politics of Maori girls' schooling. Palmerston North: Dunmore Press. ISBN 0959804552.
- Morris Matthews, Kay (2008). In their own right: Women and higher education in New Zealand before 1945. Wellington: NZCER Press. ISBN 9781877398360.
- Morris Matthews, Kay (2013). Who Cared?: Childhoods Within Hawke's Bay Children's Homes and Orphanages, 1892-1988. Eastern Institute of Technology. ISBN 9780992256432.
- Morris Matthews, Kay (2017). Recovery: Women's Overseas Service in WW1. Tairawhiti Museum. ISBN 9780994127471.
- Morris Matthews, Kay (2021). Lifting horizons: Anna Elizabeth Jerome Spencer: a biography. Hawker's Bay: Eastern Institute of Technology. ISBN 9780995142909.
- Morris Matthews, Kay (1988). Behind every school: the history of the Hawke's Bay Education Board. Napier: Hawke's Bay Education Board.

=== Journal articles ===
- Ngareta Timutimu; Simon, Judith; Kay Morris Matthews (1998). "Historical research as a bicultural project: seeking new perspectives on the New Zealand Native Schools system". History of Education. 27 (2): 109–124. doi:10.1080/0046760980270201. Wikidata Q130221515.
- K. M. Matthews; K. Jenkins (1999). "Whose country is it anyway? The construction of a new identity through schooling for Maori in Aotearoa/New Zealand". History of Education. 28 (3): 339–350. doi:10.1080/004676099284663. PMID 21268948. Wikidata Q53562559.
- Kuni Jenkins; Kay Matthews (1998). "Knowing their place: the political socialisation of Maori women in New Zealand through schooling policy and practice, 1867-1969". Women's History Review. 7 (1): 85–105. doi:10.1080/09612029800200163. Wikidata Q130221517.
- Kay Morris Matthews (2003). "'Imagining Home': women graduate teachers abroad 1880-1930". History of Education. 32 (5): 529–545. doi:10.1080/0046760032000118327. Wikidata Q104839545.
- Kay Morris Matthews (2009). "Degrees of separation? Early women principals in New Zealand state schools 1876–1926". Journal of Educational Administration and History. 41 (3): 239–252. doi:10.1080/00220620903072147. Wikidata Q58354377.
