= Paama (surname) =

Paama is a surname. Notable people with the surname include:

- Julie Paama-Pengelly (born 1964), New Zealand artist, painter, commentator, and curator
- Mart Paama (1938–2006), Estonian javelin thrower
- Matatia Paama (born 1992), Tahitian footballer
