= Christina Wirihana =

New Zealand artist and weaver

- Born: 1949 (age 76–77); Rotorua, New Zealand
- Known for: Contemporary Māori art, weaving

Christina Hurihia Wirihana (born 1949) is a New Zealand weaver from Te Arawa, Ngāti Maniapoto, Ngāti Pikiao, Ngāti Rangiunora, Ngāti Raukawa, Tainui iwi.

== Biography ==
Wirihana was born in Rotorua in 1949. Her mother is the weaver Matekino Lawless. Wirihana attributes Dame Rangimarie Hetet, Diggeress Te Kanawa and Emily Schuster as major influences but states her mother as being her most significant teacher.

Wirihana oversaw the project to weave 50 tukutuku panels for the United National Headquarters, New York involving over 60 weavers from around New Zealand including weavers from Te Roopu Raranga Whatu o Aotearoa - the national collective of Māori weavers. These panels were commissioned by the New Zealand Government after New Zealand supported the United Nations Declaration of the Rights of Indigenous Peoples in 2010. This gift was presented to the United Nations in 2015. Prior to the presentation of the panels to the UN, 49 panels were exhibited in the exhibition Kāhui Raranga: The Art of Tukutuku at Museum of New Zealand Te Papa Tongarewa.

Wirihana was commissioned to weave an installation of harakeke panels that was part of a touring exhibition called Anō te Ātaahua - Honouring the Gifts of our Elders (2000-2002) that was exhibited in Auckland, Waikato, Rotorua and Whangārei.

Wirihana is currently a senior lecturer at Toihoukura, the Māori visual arts school at Eastern Institute of Technology, and has previously been fibre tutor at Waiariki Polytechnic in Rotorua. The international touring exhibition Toi Māori: The Eternal Thread was co-curated by Wirihana.

Wirihana's weaving is often an exploration of natural materials and processes. She says: "In my weaving I am continually inspired by the surrounds of my maunga (mountain) Matawhaura, moana tapu Rotoiti (Lake Rotoiti), my marae Taurua and especially my whanau (family)."

== Recognition ==
Wirihana was the chairperson of Te Roopu Raranga Whatu o Aotearoa (National Collective of Māori Weavers in New Zealand) from 2011 to 2017.

Wirihana has received funding from Creative New Zealand to develop new work and travel overseas for residencies, including a 2014 artist residency in Hawaii. In 2003, Wirihana received Te Tohu Toi Kē from Te Waka Toi Creative New Zealand for making a positive development within Māori arts. Wirihana is a life member of the Māori Women’s Welfare League.

In 2024, Wirihana was made a Companion of Auckland War Memorial Museum.

== Notable works ==
The British Museum holds five kete whakairo made by Wirihana in 1993. One is described as plaited from undyed kiekie leaf strips in an all-over twilled pattern of horizontal bands of diamonds. There is a band of check plaiting at the rim and handles made of braided muka. A second is also decorated with a diamond pattern, the third with decorative plaiting bands alternating with bands of twill, with a check weave at base and rim; the fourth has a vertical zigzag pattern known as koeaea, which is a type of whitebait); the fifth has horizontal bands of pattern with openwork.

The Museum of New Zealand Te Papa Tongarewa holds a whariki (mat) woven by Wirihana and her mother, Matekino Lawless.

== Exhibitions ==
Wirihana has exhibited, attended symposia and residencies both nationally and internationally including:

- 2014 Māori Art Market Wellington
- 2009 Plastic Māori The Dowse Art Museum
- 2006 Artist Residency Evergreen State College in Olympia, Washington
- 1998 Kanak Cultural Centre, Jean-Marie Tjibaou Cultural Centre Nouméa
- 1992 Seven Māori Weavers Christchurch
- 1991 Ngā Kaupapa Here Aho Te Taumata, Auckland
- 1991 Te Moemoea nō Iotefa Sarjent Gallery, Whanagnui
- 1990 Ngā wahine Toa Rotoruatamati
- 1990 Kohia Ko Taikaka Anake National Art Gallery Wellington
