= Tairawhiti Polytechnic =

Tairawhiti Polytechnic was a public New Zealand tertiary education institution. The main campus is based in Gisborne in the North Island. It provides full- and part-time education leading to certificates, diplomas, and applied bachelor's degrees. On 1 January 2011, Tairawhiti Polytechnic merged with Eastern Institute of Technology in Napier.

== Subjects ==
Programmes are offered in the following subject areas:

- Business Administration & Management
- Catering & Hospitality
- Computing & Information Technology
- Early Childhood & Adult Education
- Forestry
- Māori Studies
- Nursing
- Social Sciences
- Travel & Tourism
- Trades
- Visual Arts & Design – Toihoukura
- Viticulture & Winemaking
