= June Black =

New Zealand ceramic artist and painter

- Born: 22 March 1910; Auckland, New Zealand
- Died: 1 November 2009 (aged 99); New Zealand
- Known for: Ceramic artist

June Black (22 March 1910 – 1 November 2009) was a New Zealand ceramic artist and painter.

== Early life ==
Black was born in Auckland in 1910. Her parents, Lesley and Hermia, emigrated to America when she was six months old. By 1927 her parents' marriage had ended and Hermia, Black and her sister Faith returned to New Zealand to live in Auckland. Black married Robert Frank in 1932 and they moved to Christchurch. She had three children, one tragically lost to cot death.

== Education ==
Black briefly attended Auckland University’s Elam Art School at the age of 16 but it wasn't until 1952 and living in Wellington that she took pottery classes with Helen Mason at the Petone Polytechnic.

== Career ==
Black started her art career in her 40s after personal tragedy. After the death of her first child, she went on to have two more children, but a series of operations left her with a double mastectomy and her husband Robert Frank no longer found her attractive.

Black went on to have a successful career as an artist with her original ceramics and paintings. Her works were shown alongside well known New Zealand artists Rita Angus and Colin McCahon in the 1950s and 60s. She exhibited at the Architectural Centre Gallery in Wellington, Christchurch’s Gallery 91 and New Vision gallery in Auckland. Her work was also exhibited in international shows, including shows held in Washington D.C. and in Australia. She also exhibited in the New Zealand Academy of Fine Arts exhibition Academy Women; a century of inspiration. This exhibit celebrated 100 years of women's art in New Zealand. Black had a passion for fashion and incorporated this into her artworks. She was a founding member of Ceramics New Zealand.

June Black died at the age of 99 on 1 November 2009. Her archives are held at the E H McCormick Research Library, Auckland Art Gallery Toi o Tāmaki.

Her daughter, Sheridan Keith, is a notable New Zealand writer.
