= Ben Webb (artist) =

New Zealand artist (1976–2014)

Benedict Webb (18 May 1976 – 22 September 2014) was a Dunedin, New Zealand-born artist, dividing his time between working in New Zealand and Germany. He was of Māori (Nga Puhi, Te Roroa) and European descent. Ben Webb was the son of New Zealand barrister Maurice James Knuckey (d. 21 November 2018) and New Zealand artist Marilynn Webb, and grew up surrounded by many of the top New Zealand artists of that country's "golden era" of modern art; among his godparents was Ralph Hotere.

Working largely with a mixture of oil and metallic pigments, Webb's work took old photographs as its starting-point. His images are frequently portraits from Weimar Germany in the years preceding World War II, although he has also employed still lifes as subject matter. These photographic images are recreated in large format, then distressed by the addition of pigment to form works which evoke strong reactions of melancholy or nostalgia, both in terms of their subject matter and their treatment. His work has been compared to the "gaudily tragic" Neue Sachlichkeit expressionist art of the Weimar era, with portraits of "figures whose faces seem to express the unbearable heaviness of a past trapped behind their eyes," creating images of faces that are "feral, yet knowing." His works rely heavily on chiaroscuro effect, with the negative space of the blackened backgrounds becoming presences in their own right.

Webb started exhibiting his work at the age of 19, and was the youngest New Zealand artist to have shown in a public gallery and to represent the country in a biennale, in Nouméa in 1999. He held Berlin's Goethe Institut residency in 2002 and has exhibited in Argentina, Australia, Germany, and Sweden as well as in his native New Zealand. Webb died at Aramoana on 22 September 2014, aged 38.
