= Caroline Seelig =

New Zealand tertiary education administrator

Caroline Seelig ONZM
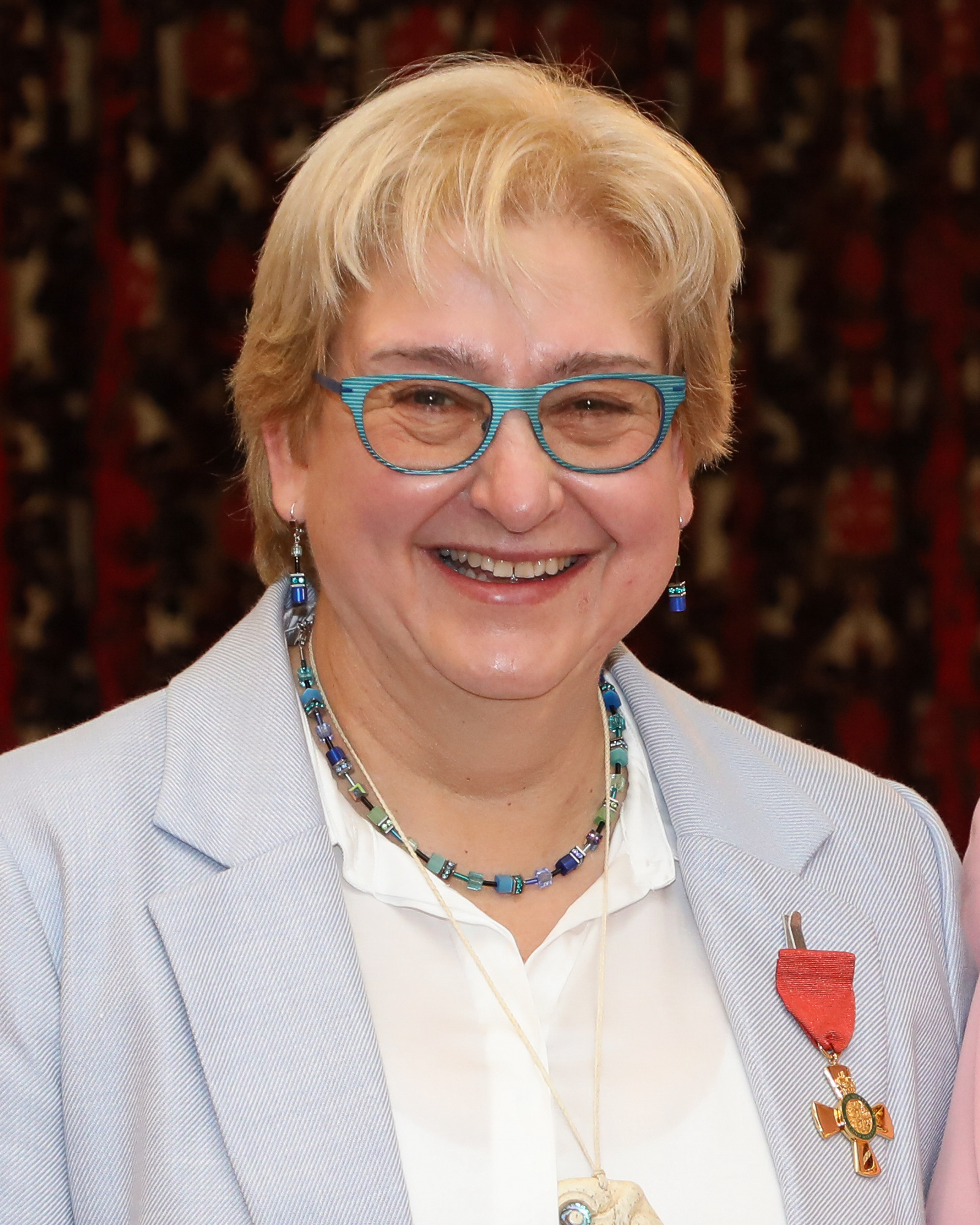
- Awards: Officer of the New Zealand Order of Merit

Academic background
- Education: Massey University, Swansea University
- Thesis: Interaction between CA++ and Mg++ ions and tolerance to NaCl of agrostis stolonifera ecotypes (1990)

Caroline Irena Seelig ONZM is a New Zealand academic administrator, and was chief executive of the Open Polytechnic of New Zealand. She has contributed to vocational education and distance learning for more than thirty years. In 2024 Seelig was appointed an Officer of the New Zealand Order of Merit for services to education.

== Career ==
Seelig completed a Master of Education at Massey University and a PhD titled Interaction between CA++ and Mg++ ions and tolerance to NaCl of agrostis stolonifera ecotypes at Swansea University.

Seelig has contributed to vocational education and distance learning in New Zealand for more than thirty years. She has held senior management roles at Tai Poutini Polytechnic, Eastern Institute of Technology, and Nelson Marlborough Institute of Technology. She was chief executive of the Open Polytechnic of New Zealand for fourteen years, ending in December 2022. Seelig led the introduction of the iQualify online learning platform, and grew the Open Polytechnic to be the largest polytechnic in the country, teaching more than 35,000 students each year.

Seelig is New Zealand's representative on the board of the intergovernmental organisation the Commonwealth of Learning. She served on the board of Ako Aotearoa and LearningWorks, and served two terms on the board of the Hutt Chamber of Commerce.

== Honours and awards ==
In 2004 Seelig was awarded a Woolf Fisher Fellowship. In 2013 Seelig was elected an Honorary Fellow of the Commonwealth of Learning. In the 2024 New Year Honours Seelig was appointed an Officer of the New Zealand Order of Merit for services to education.

== Selected publications ==
- Seelig, Caroline Irena (2013). "The Role Distance Learning Has to Play in Offender Education". Journal of Learning for Development. 1 (1). doi:10.56059/jl4d.v1i1.20. Wikidata Q131318166.
