= Gabrielle Rikihana =

New Zealand teacher and community leader

- Born: 21 January 1927
- Died: 2 March 2025; Waikanae
- Awards: Sir Kingi Ihaka Award

Academic background
- Education: Massey University
- Thesis: Invariance: a study of some conserving behaviours in young children (1972)

Gabrielle Mary Rikihana (21 January 1927 – 2 March 2025) is a New Zealand teacher and community leader. In 2020 she was awarded the Sir Kingi Ihaka Award, which recognises a lifetime contribution.

== Academic career ==
Rikihana is Māori, and affiliates to Ngāti Raukawa. Rikihana trained as a teacher in Wellington and taught at Foxton School. She then travelled to England for the Coronation, spending two years there. She taught in schools in London and travelled to Spain and Norway, as well as attending the unveiling of a memorial to soldiers who died at El Alamein during World War II but had no known graves. Before she returned to New Zealand in 1955, Rikihana wrote a radio play for the BBC Home Service called Life in a Maori Village.

Rikihana completed a Master's degree with a thesis titled Invariance: a study of some conserving behaviours in young children in 1972 at Massey University.

After taking the option of retirement at the age of sixty (after 40 years of government service) as a teacher and later Inspector for the Ministry of Education in Hamilton, she was persuaded to become involved at Te Wānanga o Raukawa.

Rikihana is a Waitangi Tribunal claimant for Ngāti Korokī. During the tribunal hearings, she described the land lost to her hapu “We have virtually no land of commercial value. Alongside Ngāti Pareraukawa and Ngāti Hikitanga, we are the most landless hapū of the inquiry district. We hold only the shadow of the land." The hapu are claiming for the return of the old Ōtaki maternity hospital and surrounding land.

In 2020 Rikihana was awarded the Sir Kingi Ihaka Award by Creative New Zealand, which is awarded "to kaumātua/kuia in recognition of their contribution to strengthening the continuity of Māori culture through their support of ngā Toi Māori".
