= Alice Pollard =

Women's rights and peace advocate from the Solomon Islands

Dr. Alice Aruhe'eta Pollard
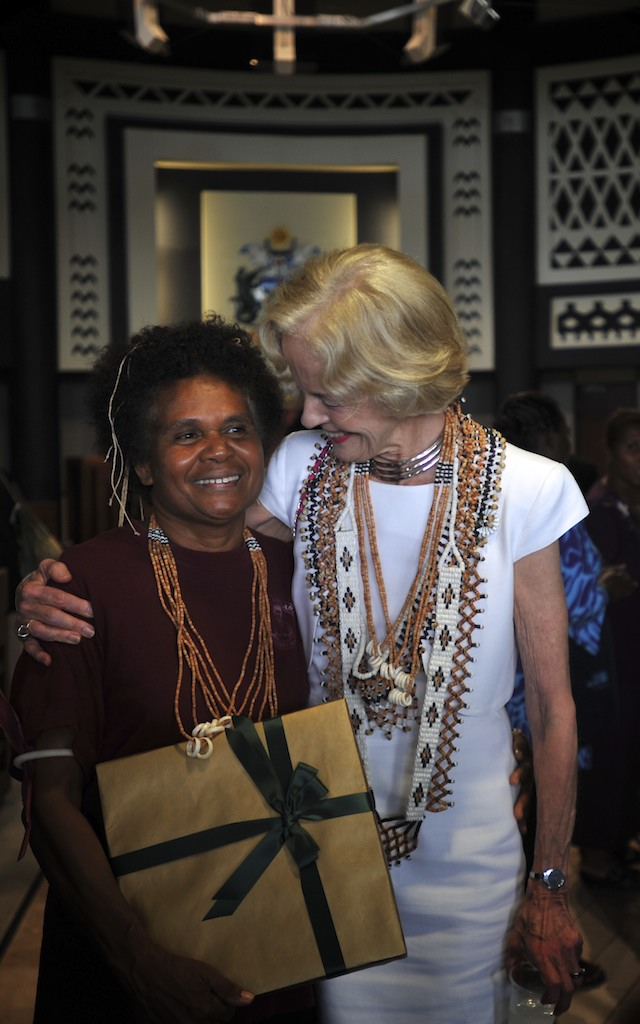
- Education: University of the South Pacific, Victoria University of Wellington, Victoria University of Technology
- Awards: International Women of Courage Award (2016 Solomon Islands nominee)

Dr. Alice Aruhe'eta Pollard is a women's rights and peace advocate from the Solomon Islands.

== Education ==
Growing up in Malaita, she attended the Su'u Secondary School. She received a teaching diploma from the University of the South Pacific in 1982. Between 1994 and 1997 she received a BA in Community Development and MA in Women's Studies, both from the Victoria University of Technology.

In 2006 she became the second woman from the Solomon Islands to have been awarded a PhD, receiving her doctorate from the Victoria University of Wellington, with a thesis titled Painaha: Gender and Leadership in 'Are'Are Society, the South Sea Evangelical Church and Parliamentary Leadership-Solomon Islands. Her doctoral advisors were Teresia Teaiwa, Prue Hyman and Kay Morris Matthews.

== Career ==
In the 1980s, Pollard began working for the government of Solomon Islands, becoming Head of the Women's Division in 1988. After leaving the government to complete her university studies, she returned and worked in the Women's Division between 1997 and 1999, including as Director of the Ministry of Women, Children and Family Affairs.

Pollard was a founding member of the Women for Peace group in the Solomon Islands group and during civil conflict played an active role in the peace movement.

An advocate for gender issues and community development, she has developed several community initiates including establishing a group for rural women in South Malaita. In 1999 she co-founded the West 'Are’are Rokotanikeni Association, also known as the Rokotanikeni Savings Group, a rural-based women's organization that promotes rural economic empowerment and supports savings and loans clubs. As of July 2013, thirteen clubs had been created, with around 3500 members and savings of just under SBD 3 million.

Pollard has held several advisory positions. From 2008 to 2010 she served as the Coordinator of Women in Government Strategic Programme, from 2009 to 2011 she was the Chairperson of the Solomon Islands College of Higher Education Council, and has been chair of the University of the South Pacific Solomon Islands Campus Advisory Committee. She has also been a member of the National Financial Inclusion Taskforce (NFIT) under the Central Bank of Solomon Islands.

In 2010 she became the president of the Solomon Islands Democratic Party; she is currently the chair of the party and Director of its leadership development program.

=== Works ===
Pollard is the author of Givers of Wisdom, Labourers Without Gain: Essays on Women in Solomon Islands and co-editor (with Marilyn Waring) of Being the First: Storis Blong Oloketa Mere Lo Solomon Aelan. With a focus on social justice, she has also contributed to research and academic journals, including papers in Oceania.

== Awards ==
She was the Solomon Islands nominee for the 2016 United States Secretary of State's International Women of Courage Award.
