= Joanne Morris =

New Zealand lawyer and law lecturer

Joanne Robin Morris OBE is a former New Zealand lawyer and law lecturer. She served as a member of the Waitangi Tribunal for 24 years, from 1989 to 2013.

== Biography ==
Morris was a law lecturer at Victoria University of Wellington and was appointed to the Waitangi Tribunal in 1989. During her career she served as chair of the Commission of Inquiry into Pornography, which reported to the government in 1989. In the same year, she was appointed as a foundation member of the Broadcasting Standards Authority and was reappointed a following for a following two terms. In 2003, she was appointed chair of the Broadcasting Standards Authority. She also chaired the Police Appointment Review Committee and was a member of the establishment board of the Legal Services Agency.

In the 1993 New Year Honours, Morris was appointed an Officer of the Order of the British Empire, for public services.

Following her retirement from law, she opened a sewing shop in the suburb of Kilbirnie. Morris's sister is Kay Morris Matthews, emeritus professor of education.
