= St Matthew's Collegiate School =

Location
- 33 Pownall Street, Masterton, New Zealand; 40.945758°S 175.650675°E

Information
- Type: Trinity school single sex girls (Years 7–13)
- Established: 1914; 112 years ago
- Ministry of Education Institution no.: 246
- Principal: Kiri Gill
- Website: www.stmatts.school.nz

St Matthew's Collegiate School is a state-integrated Anglican girls' secondary school in Pownall Street, Masterton, New Zealand.

== Notable alumnae ==
- Julie Paama-Pengelly (born 1964), tā moko artist, painter, commentator, and curator
- Katrina Shanks (born 1969), former politician
- Lydia Wevers (1950–2021), literary critic, English language literary historian, editor, and book reviewer
