= Marilynn Webb =

New Zealand artist (1937–2021)

Marilynn Webb ONZM
- Born: 11 September 1937; Auckland, New Zealand
- Died: 16 August 2021 (aged 83); Dunedin, New Zealand
- Known for: Painting, printmaking
- Children: Ben Webb
- Awards: Frances Hodgkins Fellowship (1974); Nga Tohu a Ta Kingi Ihaka at the Te Waka Toi awards (2011); Te Tohu Aroha mō Te Arikinui Dame Te Atairangikaahu at the Te Waka Toi awards (2018)

Marilynn Lois Webb ONZM (11 September 1937 – 16 August 2021) was a New Zealand artist, noted for her contributions to Māori art and her work as an educator. She was best known for her work in printmaking and pastels, and her works are held in art collections in New Zealand, the United States, and Norway. She lectured at the Dunedin School of Art, and was made an emeritus principal lecturer in 2004.

Webb's art was inspired by land issues, activism and environmentalism, including notably in the 1970s work that criticised the New Zealand government's Think Big economic strategy and its impact on the environment, as well as by Māori culture and post-colonial history. Her landscapes include depictions of Lake Mahinerangi, the Ida Valley, Fiordland, and Stewart Island / Rakiura.

== Early life and career ==
Webb was born on 11 September 1937 in Grey Lynn, Auckland, New Zealand. She was the daughter of Trevor James Webb and Elizabeth Vaiven Webb, née Turner. She is of Māori (Ngā Puhi and Te Roroa) and European descent.

Webb was the direct descendant of Moe Ngaherehere, the 47th signatory of the Treaty of Waitangi. Her birth in Auckland was the result of her mother having previously lost children in Opotiki. Her maternal grandmother oversaw her birth in Auckland, and at a few weeks old she returned from Auckland to Opotiki on the NSS "Waiotahi". She was raised in Ōpōtiki, where she attended Opotiki Primary School and Opotiki District High School. She attended Ardmore Teachers' College in Ardmore from 1955 to 1956, and during this time her mother died. In 1957 she attended Dunedin Teachers' College, and had her first art show at a coffee bar called Stewart's.

After her teacher training, Webb trained as an arts advisor under a scheme run by Arthur Gordon Tovey which had the goal of introducing Māori art into New Zealand education. In this role she worked for the Department of Education in Auckland and Northland and for the Northern Māori Project from 1958 to 1962, with the goal of promoting contemporary Māori art. The role included running arts courses for local teachers in city and country schools. In the 1960s Webb travelled widely, including to Spain, England, North Africa and Alice Springs in Australia. She also ran teacher training courses in Suva, Fiji.

During her time as an arts advisor, Webb developed her printmaking work and became one of New Zealand's leading artistic printmakers. Her work included autographic prints, intaglio printing and monotyping. In 1974 she began the development of her pastel work at the University of Otago, having been awarded the Frances Hodgkins Fellowship. It was at this time that her interest in conservation and the environment developed.

== Artworks and art education ==
Webb's love of the New Zealand South Island landscape is reflected in her print and pastel artworks, which feature depictions of Lake Mahinerangi, the Ida Valley, Fiordland, and Stewart Island / Rakiura. Her works have addressed issues such as the Clyde Dam flooding and threats to the Canterbury–Otago tussock grasslands. In 2004, New Zealand writer Cilla McQueen said of Webb's work: "In her company I feel the power of the natural world". In her 1982 series Taste Before Eating, commissioned by the Dowse Art Museum, her hand-coloured landscape prints were accompanied by satirical recipes, in the style of radio personality Aunt Daisy, which criticised Robert Muldoon's Think Big industrial projects and their impacts on New Zealand's natural resources. In 1994 she collaborated and worked with local artists at the Eastern Southland Gallery, and created pastels of the Mataura River; in 2018 the gallery named her as a patron. She formed part of the artist team who worked on the Southland Art Foundation project Rakiura in 2000, which involved visiting Stewart Island / Rakiura and creating art that responded to the environment and the people, and was part of the Department of Conservation project Tamatea, exhibited at Southland Museum and Art Gallery in 2016 and 2017, which highlighted the fragility of the Tamatea / Dusky Sound ecology. She has undertaken a number of other projects with the Department of Conservation during her career.

Webb exhibited prolifically and was involved in over 180 exhibitions and over 35 curated exhibitions/symposiums, including internationally in Australia, United States, India, Japan, Yugoslavia, Germany, Italy, Norway, Spain, France, and the United Kingdom. In 1970 she was invited to exhibit in the 2nd Graphic Triennale in New Delhi, at the 7th International Exhibition of Graphic Art in Tokyo and at Expo, Osaka. She also won first prize at the Te Awamutu Festival Exhibition with her work Dust Cloud Central Australia. In 1976 she was invited to exhibit at the 9th International Exhibition of Graphic Art, Ljubljana, Yugoslavia and at New Vision Gallery, Auckland. She also did a touring exhibition of Print Council New Zealand. In New Zealand she exhibited with New Zealand Academy of Fine Arts on numerous occasions, and with The Group in 1970, 1974, 1975, and 1976. Works by Webb are held in the collections of the Auckland Art Gallery Toi o Tāmaki, Museum of New Zealand Te Papa Tongarewa, Norwegian Contemporary Graphic Museum, and the US Library of Congress.

Together with arts educator Bridie Lonie, she co-authored Marilynn Webb: Prints and Pastels (2003). Lonie said in 2004 that Webb "works to remind people of the importance of the landscapes of the heart, to record places which will not remain the same for long, and to create images which hold local histories in a way which is accepted by those communities".

In addition to her own artistic career, Webb taught art for over thirty years in Dunedin in high schools and at tertiary level. From 1988, she lectured in printmaking at the Otago Polytechnic School of Art and in 2004 was made an emeritus principal lecturer at the school. She served as a member of the National Education Monitoring Project for the Ministry of Education, the university's Educational Assessment Research Unit, and was a governor of the Arts Foundation of New Zealand.

In August 2021, shortly before Webb's death, the Green Party moved a portrait of Winston Churchill outside their office at Parliament House in order to replace it with a new piece by Webb, which had been purchased by Parliament's art committee. In response to criticisms by Judith Collins, leader of the National Party, Elizabeth Kerekere said the Churchill portrait would remain on display elsewhere, and that the Green Party were "really excited about displaying artwork by Marilynn Webb outside the Green Party office and the hallway to the Speaker's Gallery".

== Honours and awards ==
In 2000, Webb was appointed an Officer of the New Zealand Order of Merit in the 2000 New Year Honours, for services to art and art education. In 2010, the University of Otago awarded her an honorary degree of Doctor of Laws. The University vice-chancellor, David Skegg, described Webb as "one of New Zealand's most distinguished and influential artists", and noted that in addition to her impressive artworks, she "has been at the forefront of art education in New Zealand for half a century".

In 2011, she was awarded Nga Tohu a Ta Kingi Ihaka for her lifetime of achievement in art and leadership as a Māori artist at the Te Waka Toi Awards presented by Creative New Zealand.

In 2018, she was awarded Te Tohu Aroha mō Te Arikinui Dame Te Atairangikaahu, the Supreme Award for excellence and achievement in Ngā Toi Māori (Māori art), at the Te Waka Toi Awards.

== Personal life ==
Webb's son, Ben Webb, was also an artist.

Webb died on 16 August 2021, aged 83.
