= Matekino Lawless =

New Zealand weaver

Matekino Lawless ONZM QSM
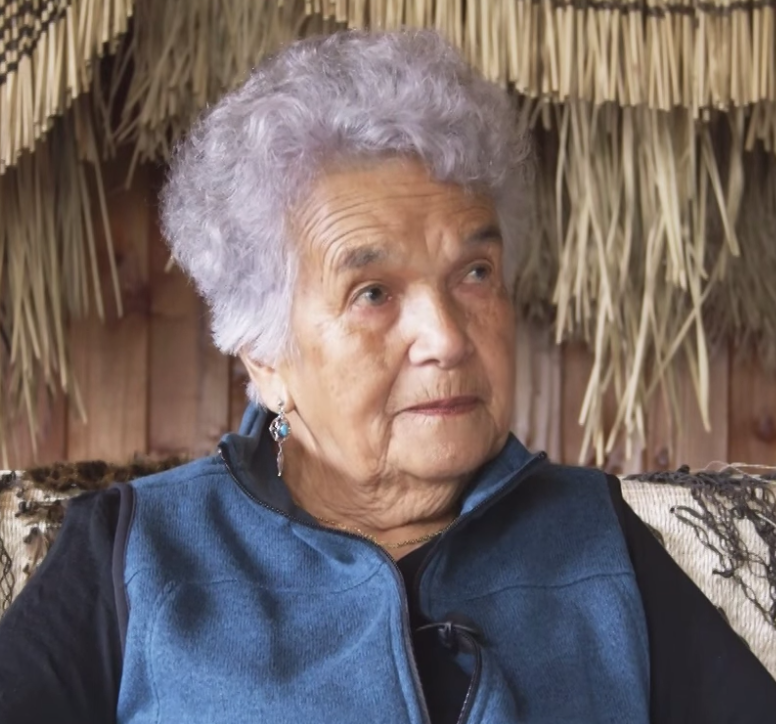
- Born: Matekino Onehi; February 1928 (age 98); Te Awamutu, New Zealand
- Known for: Weaving
- Spouse: Jack Lawless
- Awards: Kingi Ihaka Te Waka Toi Award, 2008; Te Tohu mō Te Arikinui Dame Te Atairangikaahu Award, 2015

Matekino Lawless ONZM QSM (née Onehi; born February 1928) is a New Zealand master weaver from Ngāti Maniapoto and Ngāti Whawhakia iwi. Her work is held at marae, in private collections, in the collections of New Zealand and international museums, and at the Headquarters of the United Nations.

== Biography ==
Lawless was born in Te Awamutu in 1928 to Kotahi and Ena Onehi and is of Ngāti Maniapoto and Ngāti Whawhakia descent. She was raised on a farm in Parawera and began learning to weave while staying with her kuia, Kataraina Emery. While staying with Emery, Lawless observed and learned from her, as well as from her kuia (female elders) of the Ngāti Pikiao tribe. Lawless was also influenced by Etera Foley, a Ngāti Pikaio weaver.

When a teenager Lawless moved to Rotorua and subsequently met her husband Jack. They would go on to have five children including Christina Wirihana, also a notable New Zealand weaver and with whom Lawless frequently collaborates.

== Work and recognition ==
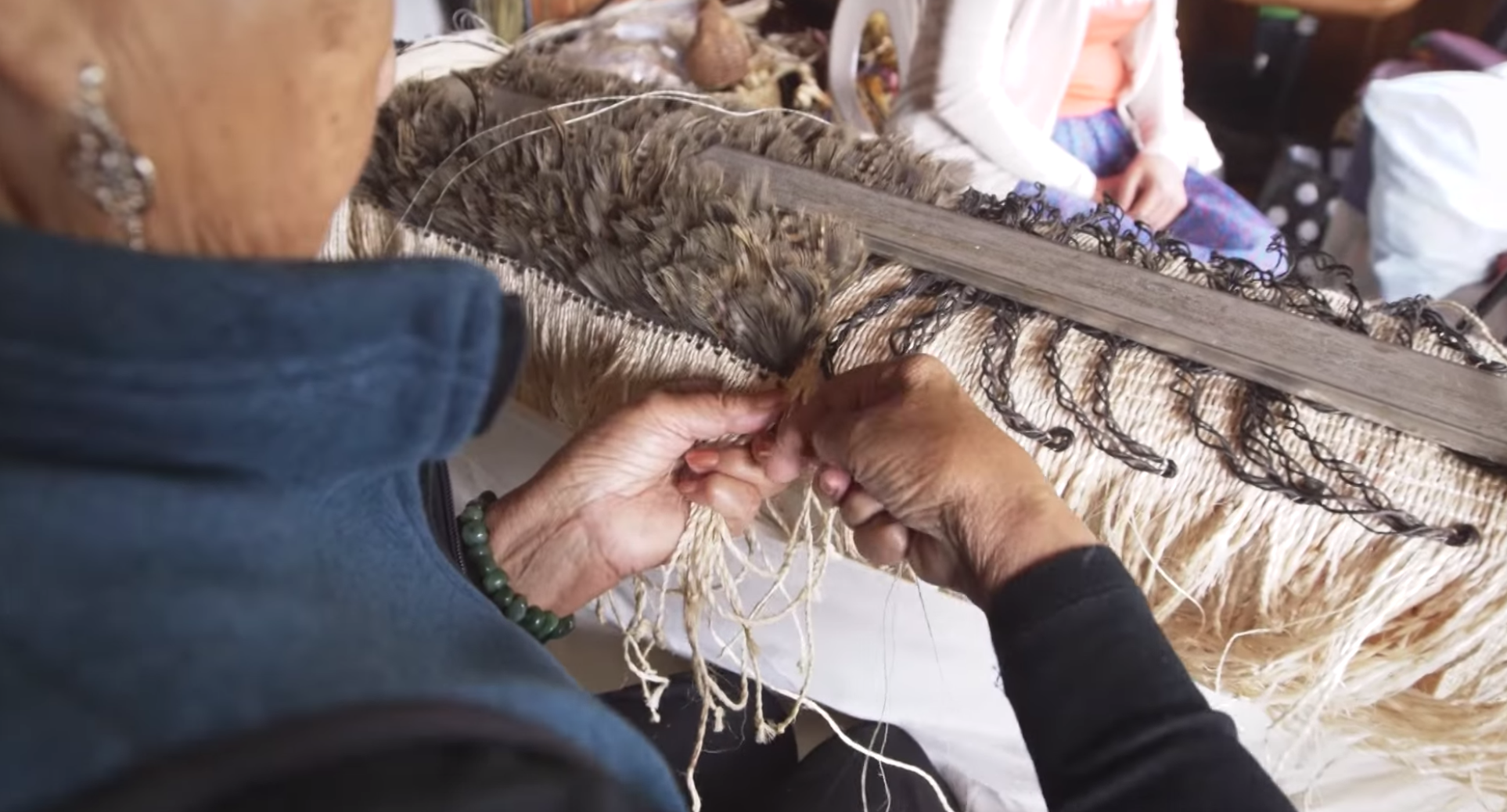
Matekino Lawless weaving

Lawless is a master weaver who also spends time passing on her skills and encouraging the preservation of raranga and traditional weaving in New Zealand. She collaborated with her daughter Christina Wirihana in 1996 to help create the interior of Ihenga, the meeting house at the Tangatarua marae on the Toi Ohomai Institute of Technology campus.

Lawless is part of the Te Roopu Raranga Whatu o Aotearoa (National Collective of Māori Weavers in New Zealand). In 2006 Lawless gained formal acknowledgement of her master weaver status in Aotearoa by being appointed to Te Kāhui Whiritoi by the management committee of Te Roopu Raranga Whatu and the New Zealand Māori Arts and Crafts Institute at Te Puia. She was one of the founding members of this group. Te Kāhui Whiritoi meets biennially with the management committee of Te Roopu Raranga Whatu at the National Weavers Hui to pass on their expertise.

In 2014 this collective of weavers exhibited 49 tukutuku panels in Kāhui Raranga: The Art of Tukutuku at Museum of New Zealand Te Papa Tongarewa. These panels were installed in 2015 at the Headquarters of the United Nations in New York.

Lawless is also a member of Taumata Mareikura, a reference group of seven of New Zealand's most accomplished weavers. This group offers expert advice and cultural knowledge to the Auckland War Memorial Museum on collections and taonga held by the Museum.

Lawless is a lifelong member of the Māori Women’s Welfare League. She is also involved in the Playcentre movement.

== Whatu Manawa: Celebrating the Weaving of Matekino Lawless ==
Lawless held her first solo exhibition at the Tauranga Art Gallery between 15 December 2018 and 10 March 2019. The catalogue of this exhibit was reviewed by Leanne Amaki in 2019 and she expressed the opinion that "Matekino Lawless (Tainui) is an artistic genius".

== Honours and awards ==
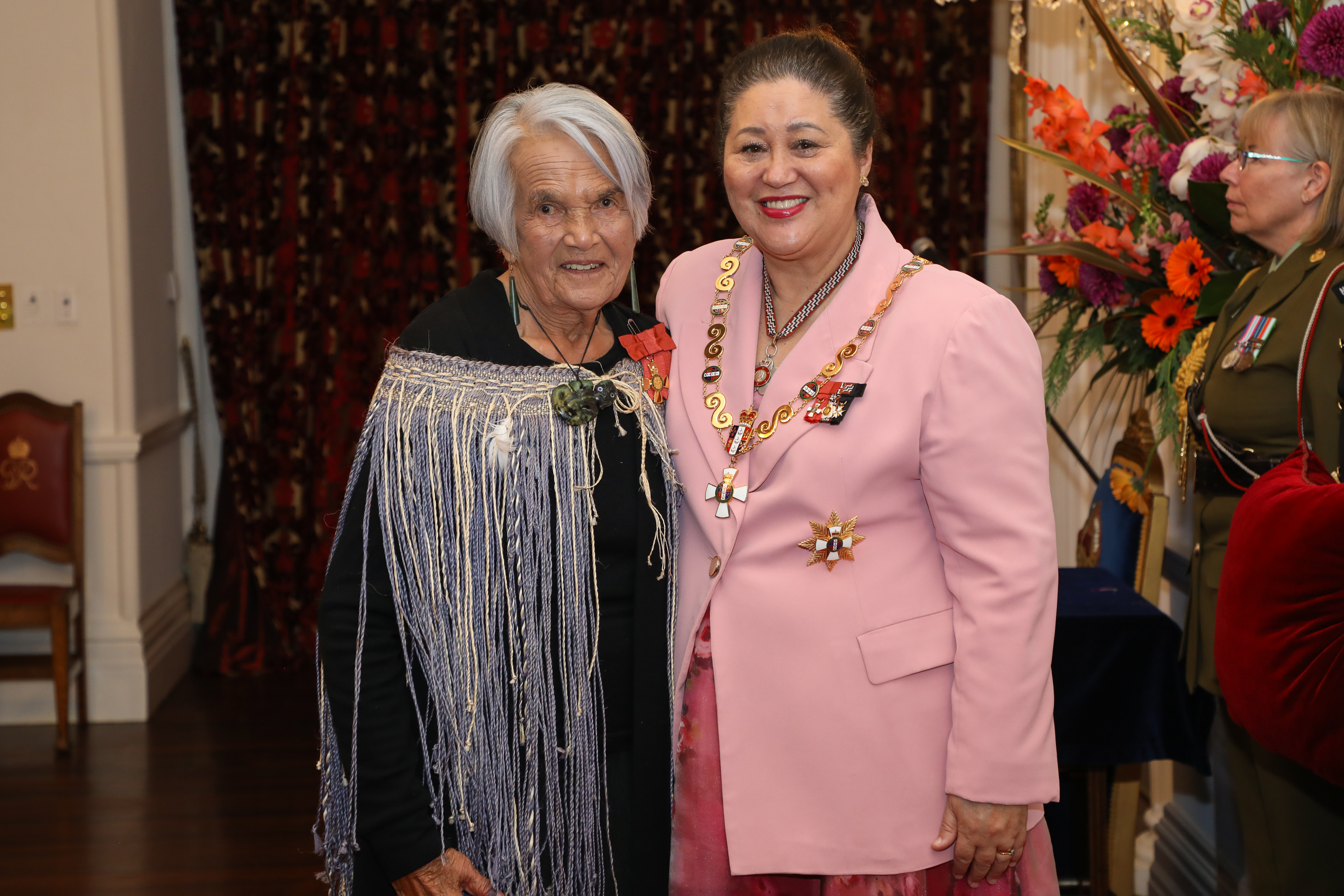
Lawless (left), after her investiture as an Officer of the New Zealand Order of Merit by the governor-general, Dame Cindy Kiro, at Government House, Wellington, on 28 May 2024

In the 1999 New Year Honours, Lawless was awarded the Queen's Service Medal for public services. In 2008 Creative New Zealand recognised Lawless' lifetime contribution by awarding her the Kingi Ihaka Te Waka Toi Award. Creative New Zealand subsequently awarded Lawless the Supreme Te Waka Toi award in 2015. In 2018 the Auckland War Memorial Museum awarded Lawless with the Auckland War Memorial Museum medal and made her a Fellow of the Museum.

In the 2023 King's Birthday and Coronation Honours, Lawless was appointed an Officer of the New Zealand Order of Merit, for services to Māori art.

== Exhibitions ==
Lawless has exhibited both nationally and internationally including:

- 2006 Toi Maori: The Eternal Thread Burke Museum
- 2014 Kāhui Raranga: The Art of Tukutuku Museum of New Zealand Te Papa Tongarewa
- 2015 Whiria – Weaving Global Connections Rotorua Museum
- 2018 Whatu Manawa: Celebrating the Weaving of Matekino Lawless Tauranga Art Gallery
