= Clare Harvey =

Professor of nursing in New Zealand

Academic background
- Education: Flinders University
- Thesis: Through the Looking Glass: The Politics of Advancing Nursing and the Discourses on Nurse Practitioners in Australia (2010)
- Doctoral advisor: Anita De Bellis, Trudy Rudge

Clare Harvey is a New Zealand academic, and is a full professor at Massey University, specialising in research to improve healthcare.

== Academic career ==
Harvey completed a Bachelor of Arts at the University of South Africa, followed by a Master of Arts at Massey University and a PhD titled Through the Looking Glass: The Politics of Advancing Nursing and the Discourses on Nurse Practitioners in Australia at Flinders University. She is a registered nurse. After leaving Flinders, Harvey joined the faculty of the Eastern Institute of Technology, where she was promoted to associate professor in 2014. Harvey then joined Massey University, where she rose to full professor in 2022.

Harvey's research concerns service provision in healthcare, including professional practice and healthcare outcomes. She has a particular interest in primary care, and inequities that affect the care people receive. Harvey has received funding from the Health Research Council to examine how to help people with chronic conditions be included in decision-making about their care, and enable their return to work. She has also researched the impact of nurse practitioners in primary care, and the concept of "missed care" in nursing that takes place after-hours and at weekends. Harvey's research showed that missed care occur on all shifts, and that there are organizational reasons why missed care occurs. Harvey has also surveyed the New Zealand nursing workforce, finding that New Zealand's nursing population is older and more mobile than the nursing population in Australia.

In 2019, Harvey was awarded a Vice Chancellor's Award and a Dean's Award for Research Excellence at Central Queensland University.

== Selected works ==
- Ian Blackman; Julie Henderson; Willis, Eileen; Patricia Hamilton; Toffoli, Luisa; Claire Verrall; Abery, Elizabeth; Harvey, Clare (2014). "Factors influencing why nursing care is missed". Journal of Clinical Nursing. 24 (1–2): 47–56. doi:10.1111/jocn.12688. PMID 25265893. Wikidata Q46715613.
- Suhonen, Riitta; Minna Stolt; Monika Habermann; Ingibjörg Hjaltadottir; Stavros Vryonides; Siri Tonnessen; Kristin Halvorsen; Harvey, Clare; Luisa Toffoli; P Anne Scott; et al. (RANCARE Consortium COST Action - CA 15208) (2018). "Ethical elements in priority setting in nursing care: A scoping review". International Journal of Nursing Studies. 88: 25–42. doi:10.1016/j.ijnurstu.2018.08.006. PMID 30179768. Wikidata Q57609062.
- P Anne Scott; Harvey, Clare; Heike Felzmann; Suhonen, Riitta; Monika Habermann; Kristin Halvorsen; Karin Christiansen; Luisa Toffoli; Evridiki Papastavrou (2018). "Resource allocation and rationing in nursing care: A discussion paper". Nursing Ethics. 26 (5): 1528–1539. doi:10.1177/0969733018759831. PMC 6681425. PMID 29607703. Wikidata Q52334859.
- Amy-Louise Byrne; Adele Baldwin; Harvey, Clare (2020). "Whose centre is it anyway? Defining person-centred care in nursing: An integrative review". PLOS One. 15 (3) e0229923. doi:10.1371/journal.pone.0229923. PMC 7064187. PMID 32155182. Wikidata Q90186799.
- Harvey, Clare; Shona Thompson; Maria Pearson; Willis, Eileen; Luisa Toffoli (2017). "Missed nursing care as an 'art form': The contradictions of nurses as carers". Nursing Inquiry. 24 (3) e12180. doi:10.1111/nin.12180. PMID 28101897. Wikidata Q61312900.
- Harvey, Clare (2011). "Legislative hegemony and nurse practitioner practice in rural and remote Australia". Health Sociology Review. 20 (3): 269–280. doi:10.5172/hesr.2011.20.3.269. Wikidata Q124776529.
