= Anne Else =

New Zealand writer and editor (born 1945)

Anne Else MNZM (born 1945) is a New Zealand writer, researcher and editor.

== Life ==
Else was born and grew up in Auckland. She studied English at the University of Auckland, graduating with a master's degree. She initially lectured at the university before moving overseas.

Else was a co-founder of the New Zealand feminist magazine Broadsheet, which was published from 1972 to 1992. Much of her work is concerned with feminist social commentary, analysis and history. She has written articles, reviews and commentary for New Zealand magazines and journals, including Broadsheet, New Zealand Listener, Landfall, Women’s Studies Journal, and has also been published in scholarly journals overseas.

In the 2004 New Year Honours, Else was appointed a Member of the New Zealand Order of Merit, for services to literature. In 2006 she completed a PhD at Victoria University of Wellington. Her thesis was an autobiography titled ‘On shifting ground: Self-narrative, feminist theory and writing practice’. A section of her memoir won the 2009 Pamela Tomlinson prize for creative writing. The full memoir, telling her life story told through her experiences of food, was published in 2013 as The Colour of Food.

Else has made a particular study of the history of closed stranger adoption in New Zealand, arising from her own experience of having been adopted in a closed adoption as an infant in 1945. Her original study, published in 1991, was updated and reissued in 2022 (with Maria Haenga-Collins) to also cover state care, donor conception and surrogacy. She has talked about the need to update the 1955 Adoption Act, having studied its history and its impact on many New Zealanders. She gave evidence about the history of the state's involvement in closed stranger adoption to the Royal Commission of Inquiry into Abuse in Care in 2019.

== Publications ==
As author:

- A Question of Adoption: Closed Stranger Adoption in New Zealand 1944-74 (Bridget Williams Books, 1991)
- False Economy: New Zealanders face the Conflict between Paid and Unpaid Work (Tandem Press, 1996)
- A Super Future? The Price of Growing Older in New Zealand (with Susan St John, Tandem Press, 1998)
- The Colour of Food (Awa Press, 2013)
- A Question of Adoption: Closed Stranger Adoption in New Zealand 1944-74 and Adoption, State Care, Doron Conception and Surrogacy 1975 - 2022 (with Maria Haenga-Collins) (Bridget Williams Books, 2022)

As editor:

- A Woman’s Life: Writing by Women About Female Experience in New Zealand (with Heather Roberts, Penguin Books, 1989)
- Protecting our Future: The Case for Greater Regulation of Assisted Reproductive Technology (with Sandra Coney, 1999)
- Women Together: A History of Women’s Organisations in New Zealand / Ngā Rōpū Wāhine o te Motu, (Historical Branch, Dept. of Internal Affairs/Daphne Brasell Associates Press, 1993; updated and republished in 2018 on the NZHistory website).
