= Stephanie Johnson (author) =

New Zealand author

Stephanie Johnson MNZM
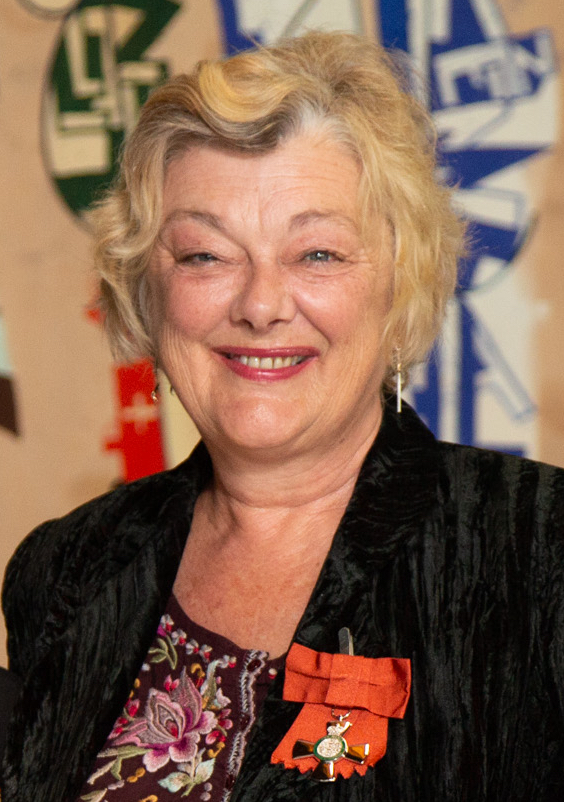
- Johnson in 2019
- Born: 1961 (age 64–65); Auckland, New Zealand
- Occupation: Author
- Writing career
- Language: English
- Notable work: The Shag Incident
- Notable awards: Deutz Medal for Fiction

Stephanie Patricia Johnson MNZM (born 1961) is a poet, playwright, and short story writer from New Zealand. She lives in Auckland with her husband, film editor Tim Woodhouse, although she lived in Australia for much of her twenties. Many of her books have been published there, and her non-fiction book West Island, about New Zealanders in Australia, is partly autobiographical.

== Background ==
Johnson was born in Auckland in 1961.

== Career ==
Johnson has taught creative writing at the University of Auckland, the University of Waikato, Auckland University of Technology and Massey University. She co-founded the Auckland Writers' Festival with Peter Wells, and served as creative director and trustee.

In 2025, it was reported that Johnson’s book, Obligate Carnivore, was disqualified from the 2026 Ockham New Zealand Book Awards because its cover was created using artificial intelligence.

=== Published works ===
Johnson has published novels, poetry, plays, and collections of short stories.

==== Novels and short stories ====
- The Glass Whittler (1989, New Women's Press), short stories
- Crimes of Neglect (1992, New Women's Press), novel
- All the Tenderness Left in the World (1993, Otago University Press), short stories
- The Heart’s Wild Surf (1996, Random House), novel
- The Whistler (1998, Vintage, Random House), novel
- Belief (2000, Vintage, Random House), novel
- The Shag Incident (2002, Vintage, Random House), novel
- Music From A Distant Room (2004, Vintage, Random House)
- Drowned Sprat and Other Stories (2005, Vintage, Random House), short stories
- John Tomb's Head (2006, Vintage, Random House), novel
- Swimmers' Rope (2008, Vintage, Random House) novel
- The Open World (2012, Vintage, Random House), novel
- The Writing Class (2013, Vintage, Random House), novel
- The Writers’ Festival (2015, Vintage, Random House), novel
- Playing for Both Sides (2016, Bridget Williams Books), creative non-fiction
- West Island: Five Twentieth-century New Zealanders in Australia (2019, Otago University Press), creative non-fiction
- Everything Changes (2021, Penguin Random House), novel

==== Plays and radio dramas ====
- Accidental Phantasies (1985), stage play
- Castle In the Harbour (1987), radio drama
- Folie à Deux (1995, with Stuart Hoar), stage play
- Hard Hitting Documentary (1995), radio drama
- Sparrow’s Pearls (1996), radio drama
- Trout (1996), radio drama

==== Poetry ====
- The Bleeding Ballerina (1987, Hard Echo Press), poetry
- Moody Bitch (2003, Godwit), poetry

== Honours and awards ==
In 1985, Johnson won the Bruce Mason Playwriting Award.

In the Montana New Zealand Book Awards, The Whistler, was shortlisted for the fiction award in 1999 and Belief was shortlisted in 2001.

The Shag Incident was awarded the Deutz Medal for Fiction at the 2003 Montana New Zealand Book Awards.

Johnson also won the 1996 Dymocks/Quote Unquote Reader's Poll, Best New Zealand Book for The Heart’s Wild Surf and Crimes of Neglect, was shortlisted for the 1993 Wattie Book Awards.

Music From a Distant Room (in 2006) and John Tomb's Head (in 2008) were nominated for International Dublin Literary Award.

In the 2019 Queen's Birthday Honours, Johnson was appointed a Member of the New Zealand Order of Merit, for services to literature.

In 2022, she received the Prime Minister's Award for Literary Achievement in Fiction.

=== Fellowships and residencies ===
Johnson received the 2000 New Zealand Post Katherine Mansfield Prize, allowing her to travel to Menton, France. She received the University of Auckland Literary Fellowship in 2001. In 2016 she was selected as the Randell Cottage Writer in Residence.
