= Toihoukura =

Coordinates: 38.6623°S 178.0218°E

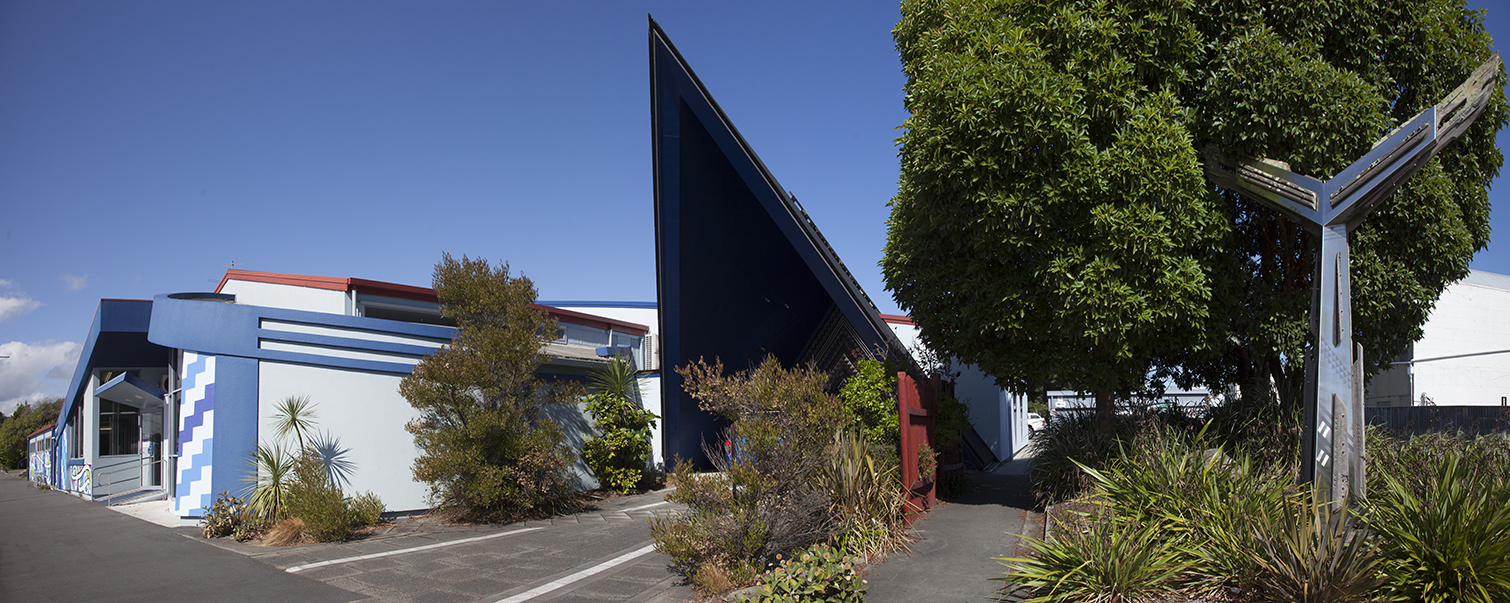
- Exterior of Toihoukura, Cobden Street, Gisborne
- Established: 1990
- Parent institution: Eastern Institute of Technology
- Location: Gisborne, New Zealand
- Campus: Urban

Toihoukura is the school of Māori Visual Arts at Eastern Institute of Technology (EIT) and is based in Gisborne, New Zealand. It is one of New Zealand’s predominant Māori Visual Arts schools. Toihoukura has developed a reputation for being an innovative national centre of Māori art practice, but is also known for its involvement in community projects such as wharenui conservation. Students from Toihoukura have worked on Cliff Whiting’s marae at Te Papa and panels used at the 2004 Athens Olympic Games. Toihoukura is known for the distinctive style of contemporary Māori art it has developed, as well as its whare wānanga approach to learning.

== History ==
Toihoukura was founded in 1990 by Ivan Ehau at Tairawhiti Polytechnic (now EIT). Tā moko artist Derek Lardelli joined the staff in 1992, kowhaiwhai artist Sandy Adsett in 1993, painter Steve Gibbs in 1994 and weaver Christina Wirihana in 2011. The school includes the Maia gallery, a koru-shaped space used for exhibitions with a meeting-house style entry way which was the result of a collaboration between Gisborne architect Graeme Nicholl and Toihoukura tutors.

== Philosophy ==
Toihoukura’s philosophy is to make sure that specifically Māori art forms are continually developed. Toihoukura's philosophy is achieved in a wānanga learning environment that encourages each student to develop a strong sense of imagery related to their own ancestral whakapapa (genealogy), while also developing personally and professionally.

== Teaching ==
The faculty currently offers the following programmes:

=== Certificates ===
NZ Certificate in Ngā Toi: Ka Tipu te Whaihanga

=== Degrees ===
Bachelor of Māori Visual Arts (Te Toi o Ngā Rangi) Te Hono ki Toi (Poutiri-ā-rangi) Bachelor of Professional Creative Practice (Honours)

=== Graduate programmes ===
Te Ara Pourewa: Graduate Diploma in Heritage and Museum Studies

=== Master ===
Te Hono ki Toi (Poutiriao) Master of Professional Creative Practice

== Ruanuku Award ==
Each year the top student at Toihoukura is awarded the Ruanuku Award. A piece of the student’s work is given to Tairāwhiti Museum through the support of Professor Jack Richards who has sponsored the prize since 1995.
