= Julie Paama-Pengelly =

New Zealand artist, painter, commentator and curator

- Born: Julie Paama-Pengelly; 1964 (age 61–62)
- Education: Bachelor of SocSci in Anthropology, Massey University; Bachelor of Maori Visual Arts (Hons), Massey University; Masters of Development Studies, Massey University, Masters of Maori Visual Arts (Hons) Massey University; Bachelor of Teaching (Sec.) Massey University.
- Known for: tā moko artist
- Spouse: previously married to Rangi Kipa (Maori artist)
- Website: www.julesartistmoko.com

Julie Paama-Pengelly (born 1964) is a New Zealand tā moko artist, painter, commentator, and curator.

== Education and early career ==
Paama-Pengelly is of Māori (Ngāi Te Rangi, Ngāi Tūwhiwhia, Ngāi Tauaiti and Ngātii Tapu) descent. She was educated at St Matthew's Collegiate School in Masterton. In 2003, she graduated with a Masters of Māori Visual Arts degree with honours from Massey University, Palmerston North. Prior to that she graduated with a diploma in teaching (1989), and a Master of Philosophy in third-world development (2003) also both from Massey University in Palmerston North. Paama-Pengelly's undergraduate degree was a degree in social sciences (anthropology). She has also studied te reo Māori through Te Ataarangi.

Her early work was in graphic design and advertising, Paama-Pengelly went into teaching and taught art at secondary schools and at tertiary level. During this time in the early 1990s, she began her artistic engagement with tā moko (traditional Māori tattoo). At this time, it was very unusual for a woman to be involved in this art form. She was inspired to get into tā moko by Robert Jahnke and Derek Lardelli. She says in an interview about being captured by the power of tā moko, ''I witnessed someone getting significant moko. I realised it was a powerful way for our community to claim their pride ... reclaiming positive forms of identity. At the time, I had no idea it was going to become such a popular form of identity.''

== Career and works ==
Paama-Pengelly was the head of faculty between 2004 and 2007 of Te Toi Whakarei, Art and Visual Culture at Te Whare Wānanga o Awanuiārangi in Whakatāne. Paama-Pengelly has also taught at the Western Institute of Technology, Taranaki and Massey University, Wellington. She established a tattoo studio in Mt Maunganui in 2011 called Art + Body.

Her art practice includes paintings, printmaking, installation, and tā moko. She has authored books on Māori art, curated art exhibitions and contributed to critical discourse on Māori art. Her work has helped lead to a revival of indigenous tattoos in both New Zealand, but also worldwide.

Writer Awhina Tamapara says of Paama-Pengelly's practice: "Exploring how Māori are portrayed by others (as opposed to how they portray themselves) is a predominant concern of her work. Her paintings are paradoxical – a direct response to the stereotypical, negative images of Māori. In her 'Broke' series, she has explored how Māori are portrayed commercially."

In 2022, Paama-Pengelly was Trust chairperson for Te Tuhi Mareikura Trust.

=== Books ===
- Writer: A History on Skin – The Art of Ta Moko, Toi Maori Aotearoa, March, 2002
- Author: Maori Art and Design New Holland Press, Auckland, May 2010 ISBN 9781869662448

=== Curation ===
- Nga Korero Aoteatea – Fifty Maori Artists, Dowse Art Museum, Wellington 1999
- Ta Moko is NOT Tattoo, interactive CD Rom Artpix 3 Houston, USA, 2001
- Tau-Marumaru, Harris Fine Arts Center BYU, Utah USA 2005
- Navigating the Now, Whakatane Museum & Gallery, 26 June–Aug 8 2010
- Roundabout: 108 Artists, Wellington, Israel, 2007–2010

== Personal life ==
Paama-Pengelly is of Māori (Ngāi Te Rangi, Ngāi Tūwhiwhia, Ngāi Tauaiti and Ngāti Tapu) descent.
