= Frances Cherry =

New Zealand writer (1937–2022)

- Born: Frances Eleanor Birchfield; 25 November 1937; Wellington, New Zealand
- Died: 24 April 2022 (aged 84); Wellington, New Zealand
- Occupation: Writer

Frances Eleanor Cherry (née Birchfield; 25 November 1937 – 24 April 2022) was a New Zealand novelist, short-story writer, and teacher of creative writing.

== Biography ==
Cherry was born on 25 November 1937 in Wellington. Her parents, Albert and Connie Birchfield, were well known communists and she described her embarrassment as a teenager at seeing her mother making a speech on a soapbox in Courtenay Place, or her father selling the People’s Voice in Cuba Street.

Cherry wrote novels for both adults and children, and her short fiction has appeared in anthologies and educational publications and been broadcast on radio. Her work often includes themes of feminism, lesbianism and anti-establishment ideas. Dancing With Strings was described by Aorewa McLeod, a lecturer at the University of Auckland, as "New Zealand's first lesbian novel".

Cherry ran memoir and novel writing workshops for more than 20 years in adult community education classes around Wellington. When cutbacks led to many of those courses being cut, she continued to run them in her own home.

Cherry lived in Wellington, and died there on 24 April 2022.

== Awards and prizes ==
Leon was shortlisted in the Senior Fiction category of the 2001 New Zealand Post Children’s Book Awards and was also named as a 2001 Storylines Notable Book.

== Bibliography ==
Adult fiction

- Dancing with Strings (1989)
- The Widowhood of Jacki Bates (New Women’s Press, 1991)
- Washing up in Parrot Bay (Steele Roberts, 1999)

Short stories

- The Daughter-in-Law and Other Stories (New Women’s Press, 1986)
- Gate Crasher (Earl of Seacliff Art Workshop, 2006)
- Out of Her Hair and Other Stories (Earl of Seacliff Art Workshop, 2009)
- Double Act: stories from Frances Cherry and Annabel Fagan (Earl of Seacliff Art Workshop, 2010)

Memoir

- To be Perfectly Frances (Steele Roberts, 2018)

Children’s and young adult fiction

- In the Dark (Mallinson Rendel, 1999)
- Leon (Mallinson Rendel, 2000)
- Flashpoint (Scholastic, 2006)
- Kyla (Scholastic, 2009)
- Pay Back (CreateBooks, 2017)
