= Prue Hyman =

New Zealand feminist economist

- Born: Prudence Janet Hyman; 23 March 1943 (age 83); Harrow, Middlesex, England

Academic background
- Education: University of Oxford

Academic work
- Discipline: feminism, economics, special education
- Institutions: Victoria University of Wellington
- Doctoral students: Alice Pollard
- Cricket career

Cricket information
- Batting: Right-handed
- Bowling: Right-arm off-break
- Role: Batter

Domestic team information
- Years: Team
- 1969/70–1983/84: Wellington

Career statistics
Competition	First-class	List A
Matches	56	1
Runs scored	1,794	34
Batting average	23.60	34.00
100s/50s	1/6	0/0
Top score	101	34
Balls bowled	809	–
Wickets	22	–
Bowling average	16.81	–
5 wickets in innings	0	–
10 wickets in match	0	–
Best bowling	3/16	–
Catches/stumpings	22/–	0/–
- Source: CricketArchive, 15 September 2023

Prudence Janet Hyman (born 23 March 1943) is a New Zealand feminist economist and former cricketer. She was associate professor of economics and gender and women's studies at Victoria University of Wellington until controversial restructuring between 2008 and 2010 abolished Gender and Women's Studies. During the 2023 and 2026 New Zealand general election, Hyman stood as a candidate for the Women's Rights Party.

== Academic career ==
Hyman earned a Master of Arts degree at the University of Oxford. While a student there in the 1960s, she was barred from joining the Oxford Union, and so campaigned for women to be allowed to join the society. The campaign was successful, and Hyman was one of the first women to serve on the Oxford Union's Standing Committee.

After graduating from Oxford University, Hyman worked as a statistician before emigrating to New Zealand in 1969 to work at Victoria University of Wellington. At Victoria, she was involved in the Women's Studies at the university and the Women's Studies Association. Hyman became a feminist and her research focuses on the links between ethnic, class and gender discrimination.

Hyman studied the personal aspects of economics rather than the typical corporate or governmental aspects and is frequently called on by the popular press on issues such as living wages and pay equity on which she has published widely and makes the case for the disadvantaged: [o]rthodox economics wildly exaggerates the productivity justifications for such wide differences [between the wealthy and the poor]. Top people essentially pay themselves and each other what they can get away with while squeezing those at the bottom. She was a founding member of, and remains a significant contributor to, the Labour, Employment and Work in New Zealand conferences at Victoria.

Hyman's 2000 report into the culture of the New Zealand Police, commissioned by the police themselves, has been cited as a major driver for change within the force.

Hyman eventually rose to become an associate professor of economics and gender and women's studies at Victoria University. She resigned after the University dissolved its gender and women's studies programme during a controversial restructuring between 2008 and 2010.

== Political activism ==
During the 2023 New Zealand general election, Hyman was ranked fifth on the Women's Rights Party's party list. She has criticised the transgender movement for allegedly encroaching on female spaces and replacing gender with sex as a classifying variable. During the 2023 election, the Women's Rights Party gained 2,513 votes (0.08%) of the party vote and did not win any seats.

During the 2026 New Zealand general election, Hyman stood as a candidate for the Women's Rights Party and was ranked fifth on the party list. On 7 November, the Women's Rights Party won 1,856 votes or 0.07% of the party vote based on preliminary results, below the five percent threshold needed to enter Parliament.

== Personal life ==
Hyman is an out lesbian and dog-owner. She is also of Jewish descent. Hyman played cricket for Middlesex Women Second XI from 1961 to 1965, and subsequently for Wellington Women.

== Selected works ==
- Women and Economics: A New Zealand Feminist Perspective 2014 ISBN 9780908912612
- Women in CIB: Opportunities for and barriers to the recruitment, progress and retention of women in the Criminal Investigation Branch (CIB) New Zealand Police 2000
- The impact of feminist analysis on economics : why so little? : how can it be increased? 1993
- Review of the New Zealand Council for Recreation and Sport State Services Commission 1983
- Economic aspects of special education in New Zealand 1978
