= Eastern Institute of Technology =

Tertiary education institution in New Zealand

- Te Aho A Māui
- EIT logo
- Motto: Educate, Innovate, Transform
- Established: 4 October 1975
- Affiliations: Public NZ TEI
- President: Chris Collins
- Faculty: 340 FTE Staff
- Students: 10,222 individual student or 4,597EFTS (2016)
- Location: Napier, New Zealand; 39.5468°S 176.8385°E
- Website: eit.ac.nz

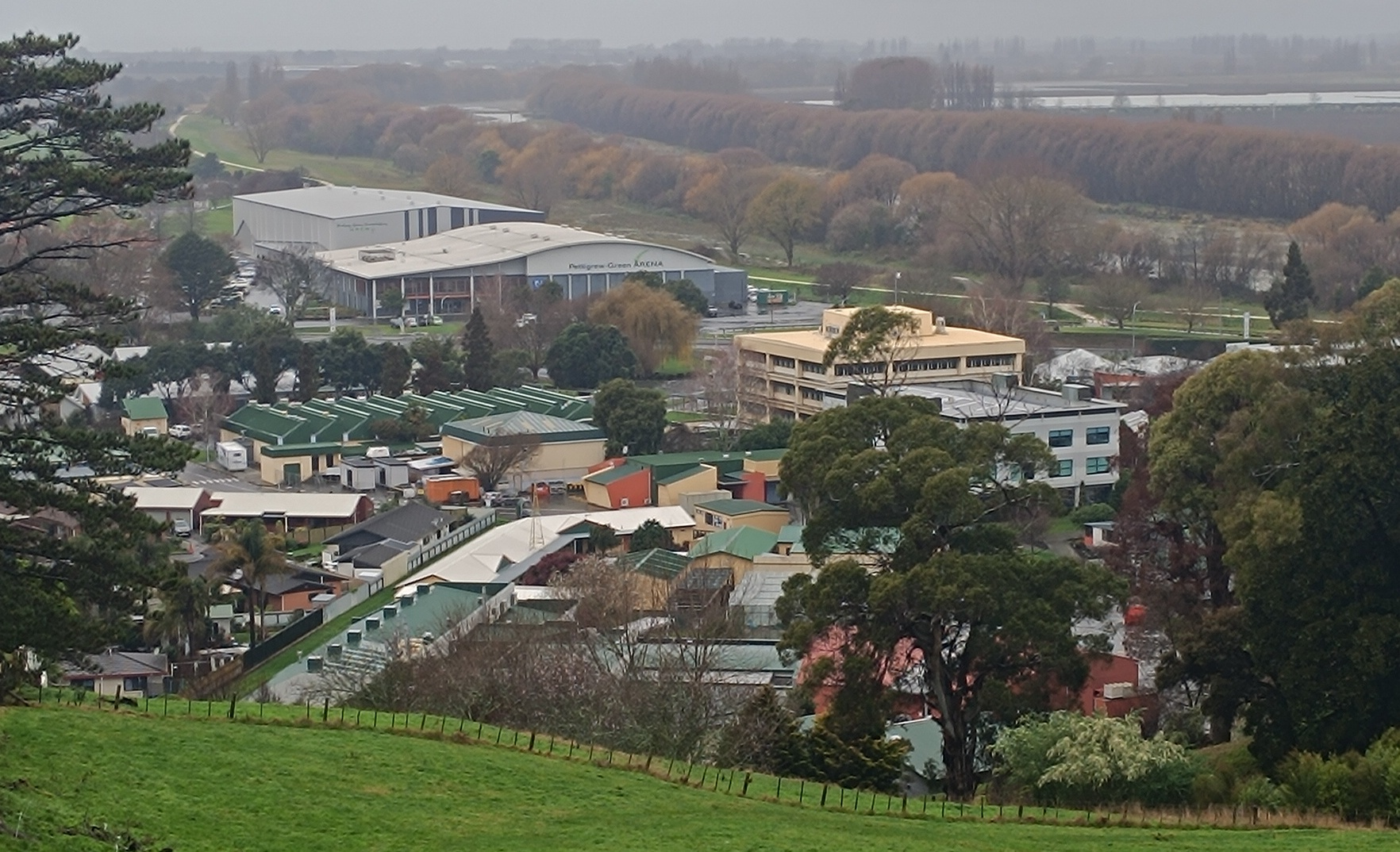
View of campus from nearby hill

The Eastern Institute of Technology (EIT) is a public tertiary education institution headquartered in Taradale, Napier, New Zealand. Founded as the Hawke's Bay Community College in 1975, the institute now operates three campuses in Hawke’s Bay, Auckland, and Gisborne.

== History ==
The Eastern Institute of Technology, as it is named today, was officially opened in 1975 as the Hawke's Bay Community College by the New Zealand minister of education Phil Amos. Amos laid the foundation stone, on 4 October 1975. In 1987, the Hawke's Bay Community College was renamed the Hawke's Bay Polytechnic. The next name change to the "Eastern Institute of Technology" occurred in 1996, the Institute's 21st year. The site of the main campus was donated to the people of Hawke's Bay at the time of the province's centenary by the late Margaret Hetley and in memory of her husband, Arnaud.

EIT had 10,000 students in 2014. Approximately 400 international students study at EIT each year and come from over 40 different countries. It has its own Student Village across the road from the Hawke's Bay campus.

Signposts on Taradale Campus

A campus-wide wireless network, EIT Anywhere, allows students to use laptops or other mobile devices on campus. EIT Online, EIT's learning management system, allows students and staff to share information, communicate and interact through online course sites. It is powered by Moodle, and in October 2008 EIT Hawke's Bay hosted the annual Moodle conference. with Martin Dougiamas as keynote speaker. The MoodleMoot was successful and described as "brilliantly run, fantastic speakers".

In January 2011, EIT Hawkes Bay officially merged with Tairawhiti Polytechnic in Gisborne. On 1 April 2020, Eastern Institute of Technology was subsumed into New Zealand Institute of Skills & Technology alongside the 15 other Institutes of Technology and Polytechnics (ITPs).

In mid-July 2025, the Vocational Education Minister Penny Simmonds announced that the Government would return EIT and nine other polytechnics to regional governance by 1 January 2026.

On 1 January 2026, the Eastern Institute of Technology left Te Pukenga to become an independent entity again. In mid-February 2026, the Government allocated EIT $34.5 million to cover the polytechnic during its transition period.

== Campus ==
The Eastern Institute of Technology has a 28-hectare (69-acre) main campus in Taradale, a suburb in Napier. It is situated between the twin cities of Napier and Hastings, (approximately 9 km (5.6 mi) from Napier, and 11 km from Hastings), which together comprise the fifth largest urban area in New Zealand. There are also additional campuses in Tairāwhiti and Auckland on Queen Street. EIT also has learning centres in Hastings, Waipukurau, Ruatoria, Wairoa and a centre in Maraenui, a suburb of the city of Napier.

== Courses and programs ==
It has two faculties. The Faculty of Educations, Humanities, and Health Science includes Te Ūranga Waka – Te Whatukura, Toihoukura, Education and Social Sciences, Health and Sport Science and Nursing schools, and an Ideaschool. The Faculty of Commerce and Technology includes Tourism and Hospitality, English Language Centre, Trades and Technology, Business, Computing and Applied Science schools.

In 2015 the teacher student ratio was 14.5:1. EIT aims to meet the demands of the region's key industry groups as well as the wider employment market, and networks closely with the community. Programmes such as Viticulture, Wine and Food Science and Nursing are unique to the region.

There are now more than 130 programmes offered at masters, postgraduate, degree, diploma or certificate level, across a range of subject areas including:

- Agriculture
- Animal Care and Vet Nursing
- Art, Design, Video, Music and Fashion
- Business
- Computing and Information Technology
- Education
- English Language Courses
- Grapegrowing and Winemaking
- Hair, Beauty and Massage
- Health and Development
- Horticulture
- Maori Studies
- Nursing and Health Professions
- Trades and Technology
- Science
- Social Sciences
- Sport and Recreation
- Tourism and Hospitality

== Notable staff and alumni ==
- Aayden Clarke, rugby union player
- Clare Harvey, professor of nursing
- Carla Houkamau, professor of psychology
- Elizabeth Kerekere, politician
- Annemarie Gillies, professor of Māori research
- Derek Lardelli, tā moko artist, painter, carver
- Kay Morris Matthews, emeritus professor
- Patrick Power, operatic tenor
- Kim Robertson (athlete)
- Mary-anne Scott, writer and musician
- Caroline Seelig, academic administrator
