= Smashwords =

American self-publishing platform

- Founded: 2008
- Founder: Mark Coker
- Country of origin: United States
- Headquarters location: Los Gatos, California
- Distribution: Worldwide
- Official website: www.smashwords.com

Smashwords, Inc., based in Los Gatos, California, is a platform for self-publishing e-books. The company, founded by Mark Coker, began public operation in 2008 and was acquired by Draft2Digital, LLC in 2022.

Authors and independent publishers upload their manuscripts as electronic files to the service, which converts them into multiple e-book formats for various devices. Once published, the books are made available for sale online at a price set by the author or independent publisher.

== History ==
Coker began work on Smashwords in 2005 and officially launched the website in May 2008. Within the first seven months of launching, the website published 140 books. Due to initially low profits, the firm switched to a distribution model that offered retailers a "30% commission in exchange for digital shelf space". Smashwords achieved a profit in 2010 and has distributed some of its books via Apple, Barnes & Noble, Kobo, Sony, and KDP, Amazon.com's e-book publishing website.

In 2012, Smashwords announced that it would partner with 3M Cloud Library, which would allow for the option for their authors' books to be available in libraries, and that it had reached about 127,000 titles by 44,000 authors.

Coker, a former Silicon Valley publicist, started Smashwords in 2008 with the claimed goal of using technology to democratize publishing—allowing writers to appeal directly to readers without having to deal with gatekeepers such as agents and editors. In keeping with this mission, Smashwords applies no editorial screening. The only e-books the firm rejects are ones that contain plagiarism, illegal content or incitement to racism, homophobia or violence.

Smashwords does not use digital rights management.

In February of 2022 it was announced that Smashwords would be acquired by Draft2Digital with a deal that was completed in March 2022. This united two of the largest independent distributors for self-published books.
