= Sheridan Keith =

New Zealand author, artist, broadcaster and curator

- Born: 1942 (age 83–84); Wellington, New Zealand
- Occupations: Author; artist; broadcaster; curator
- Writing career
- Notable work: Zoology (1995)

Sheridan Keith (born 1942) is a New Zealand author, artist, broadcaster and curator.

== Life and career ==
Keith was born in Wellington in 1942. She is the daughter of ceramic artist and painter June Black. She studied zoology and English literature at Victoria University of Wellington. During the 1960s she spent a decade living in London, and returned to New Zealand in 1974, where she worked as a journalist for several years before beginning to write fiction.

Her work has included broadcasting, journalism and teaching creative writing, and her writing has been published in The London Magazine, Landfall, the New Zealand Listener and other magazines. Her first collection of short stories, Shallow are the Smiles at the Supermarket (1991) was shortlisted in the Best First Book category of the Commonwealth Writers Prize. Her first novel, Zoology (1995), grew out of a short story included in her second collection of short stories, Animal Passions (1992). It won the Fiction Award at the 1996 Montana Book Awards. Academic Terry Sturm said Keith's short stories "focus on the practices and aspirations of women in a demanding world".

Since around 1995, Keith has owned a gallery called Blikfang Art and Antiques in Northcote, a suburb of Auckland.
