= Derek Lardelli =

New Zealand artist

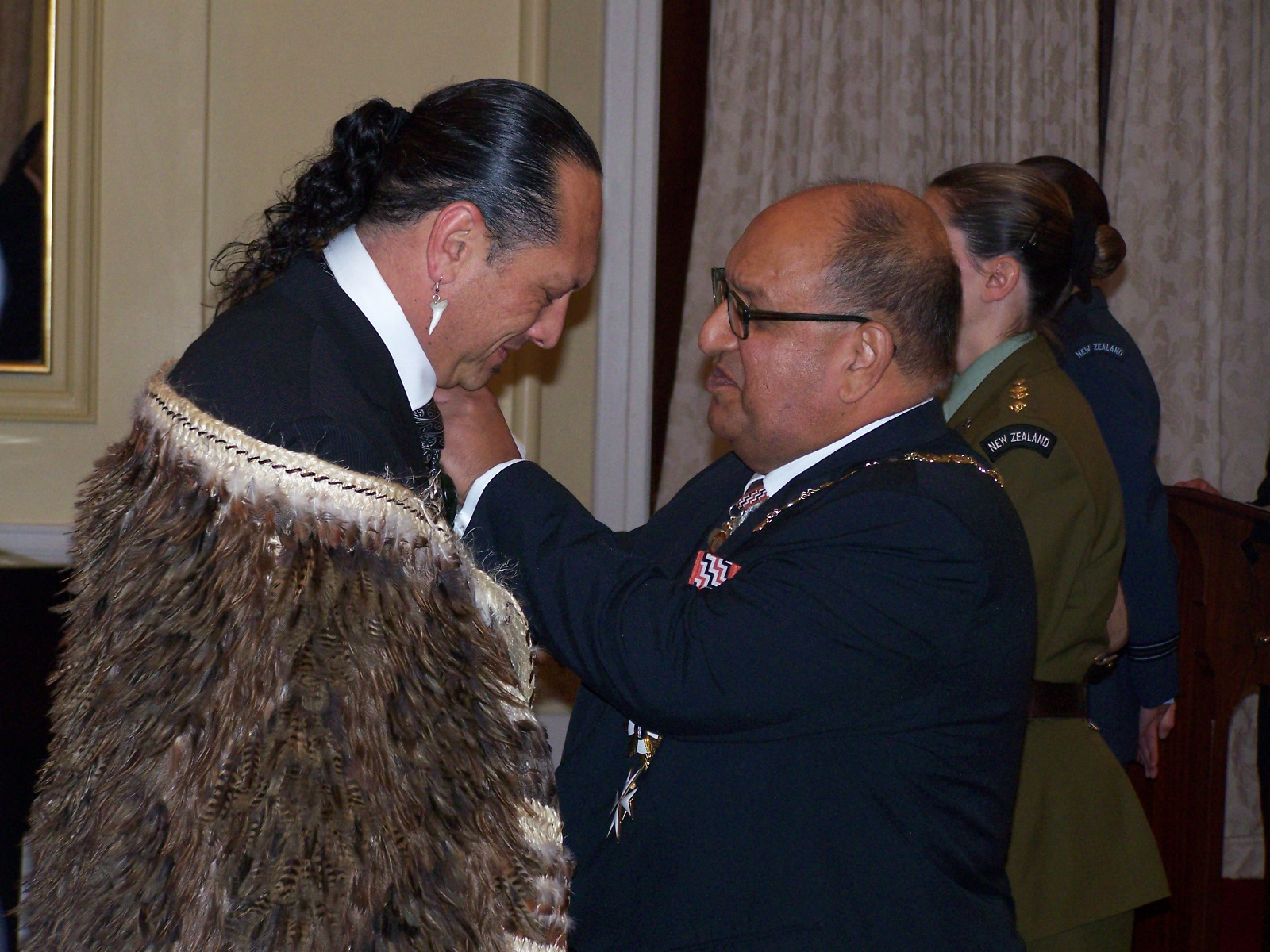
Lardelli's investiture as an Officer of the New Zealand Order of Merit by the governor-general, Anand Satyanand, in 2008

Sir Derek Arana Te Ahi Lardelli KNZM (born 1961) is a New Zealand tā moko artist, painter, carver, kapahaka performer, composer, graphic designer, researcher of whakapapa and oral histories and kaikōrero. He affiliates to the Ngāti Konohi hapū of Ngāti Porou, and the Ngāi Te Aweawe hapū of Rongowhakaata, and lives in Gisborne, where he is pouwhirinaki/principal lecturer at Toihoukura at Eastern Institute of Technology.

In 2004, Lardelli received a New Zealand Arts Foundation Laureate Award, and in 2006 he was the inaugural Gallipoli artist-in-residence. In the 2008 Queen's Birthday Honours, Lardelli was appointed an Officer of the New Zealand Order of Merit, for services to Māori arts, in particular tā moko. In the 2020 Queen's Birthday Honours, he was promoted to Knight Companion of the New Zealand Order of Merit, for services to Māori art.

== Kapa o Pango haka ==
Lardelli composed the Kapa o Pango haka in 2005 for the All Blacks.
