= William Fitzgerald (educationalist) =

New Zealand teacher, educationalist

Wlliam Sanderson Fitzgerald
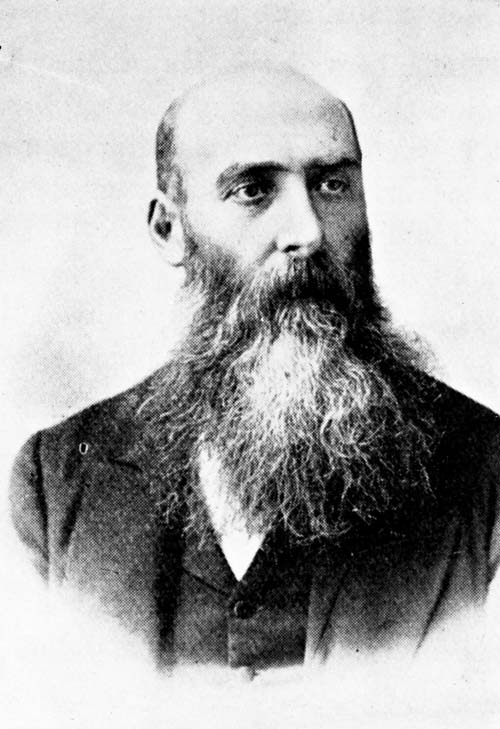
- Born: 12 November 1838; Musselburgh, Midlothian, Scotland
- Died: 27 January 1920; Dunedin, Otago, New Zealand
- Occupations: Teacher and educationalist
- Known for: Contributing to the development of education in New Zealand

William Sanderson Fitzgerald (12 November 1838 – 27 January 1920) was a New Zealand teacher and educationalist. Originally from Scotland, he emigrated to New Zealand in 1861. He was the first rector of Otago Normal School, also known as Dunedin Training College, the first place in New Zealand to offer formal teaching qualifications. Fitzgerald also formed the New Zealand Educational Institute. After retiring, he helped develop St Margaret's College at the University of Otago, the first women-only hostel. Throughout his career, Fitzgerald played a crucial role in the development of education in New Zealand.

== Early life ==
William Fitzgerald was born in Musselburgh, Midlothian, Scotland, on 12 November 1838 to Jean Sanderson and her husband James Fitzgerald, a hatter. William was raised as a Presbyterian and his father served as a Home Missionary for the Church.

Fitzgerald first attended Newbigging School and then teacher training college at Moray House in Edinburgh and was praised for his attentiveness as a pupil. On 17 May 1861 he married a fellow teacher, Annie Copland Annandale at St Cyrus, Kincardineshire.

== Career ==
In 1859 Fitzgerald was appointed as an assistant master at St. John's Grammar School's secondary department in Hamilton, South Lanarkshire, where he taught English, Classics and Maths.

In 1861, he was appointed by the Colonial Committee of the Free Church of Scotland to be the principal of a Presbyterian boarding and day school in Pigeon Bay on Banks Peninsula in New Zealand's South Island. William served as Schoolmaster aboard The Royal Stuart during his migration to New Zealand, conducting daily classes for children on board. Once arriving in Lyttelton, the Fitzgerald's sailed to Pigeon Bay where William would be Headmaster at Pigeon Bay Boarding School. Under Fitzgerald, the school's reputation thrived, attracting boarders from as far away as Wellington, and gaining a reputation as the best school in Canterbury. While at Pigeon Bay, Fitzgerald proposed to withdraw the school from the Denominational System which then prevailed in Canterbury, with funds from the Provincial Council distributed separately to Episcopalian, Presbyterian and Wesleyan denominations. The withdrawal of Pigeon Bay as a Presbyterian school provoked enough questions that an investigation was commissioned, and the entire Demoninational System was then scrapped in favour of a public school system.

On 16 August 1869, Fitzgerald began working as Head Master of Ōamaru District School. The position promised a better salary and possible prestige as it was being turned into a grammar school, a rarity in the South Island at the time. As rector, Fitzgerald is credited with growing the number of pupils and erecting new school buildings. He also taught English, arithmetic and mathematics. In March 1872 he organised a meeting for teachers in the Northern District to create a sub-branch of the Otago Schoolmasters' Association.

After becoming closely associated with the secretary of the Otago Education Board, John Hislop, Fitzgerald was appointed to establish the Otago Normal School in Dunedin in 1876, a primary school with a department for teacher trainees. This was the first place in the country to offer formal initial teaching qualifications. Before assuming this role, he travelled to Victoria, Australia and researched the evolution of teaching education there.

As rector, Fitzgerald presented lectures, supervised teacher trainee practicums and coordinated their teachers education with university work as he encouraged students to simultaneously attend the University of Otago, in order to raise their qualifications. Fitzgerald taught science, geography and history himself. It was noted that due to the state of education in Otago at the time, he was "forced to teach his students each subject and then, if time allowed, teach them how to teach it". He even instructed some students in teaching Braille. Fitzgerald placed a big emphasis on teaching pedagogy, not just the practical elements of teaching. During this time he also created the New Zealand Educational Institute in 1882, a national teachers association that connected all of the Provincial Educational Institutes and Teachers' Associations to form a council. This differed from the call to form a Certified Teacher's Association of New Zealand, as Fitzgerald wanted all teachers to be eligible for membership and not just certified ones, which were a large portion of the workforce. Basing his vision off the principles he learnt of the Scottish Educational Institute, Fitzgerald's main concerns were raising the standard of education throughout the colony and improving on the conditions of schools and teachers. In 1885 he was appointed as first president of the New Zealand Educational Institute, advocating for a teacher's court of appeal and a teacher's legal defence.

In 1886 the Otago Education Board motioned for the training college to focus on the physical practice of teaching rather than encouraging students to concurrently attend university, which Fitzgerald strongly opposed along with the minister of education Sir Robert Stout. Fitzgerald served as rector until the school's closing in 1894.

The Dunedin Training College board decided in August 1895 to close, because of insufficient funding, despite increasing enrolments. Staff were given notice the following February, and although the College reopened almost immediately under David Renfrew White, Fitzgerald was appointed as Inspector of Schools for Otago in August 1895, where he had to travel across the region. He retired in 1909 at age 71, and was presented with a gold watch, a roller-top desk and an American organ for his wife, honouring forty years of service.

== Personal life ==
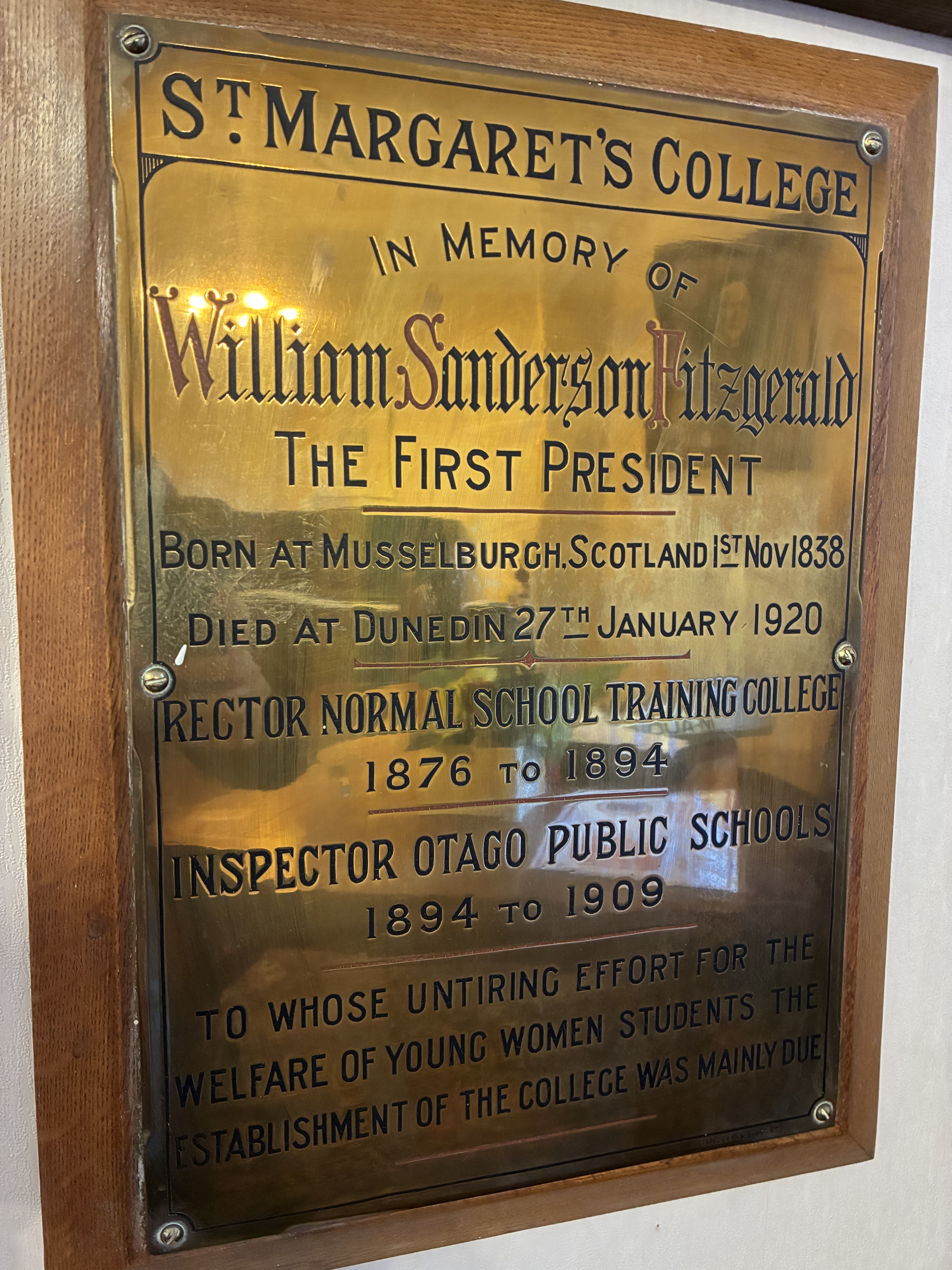
Commemorative plaque at St Margaret's College. After listing his dates and positions, the text reads "To whose untiring effort for the welfare of young women students the establishment of the college was mainly due."

William was heavily involved with his Christian faith his whole life. William was elected as an Elder of his faith community. In his retirement, he was in one of the two Presbyterian committees that combined to develop St Margaret's College at the University of Otago, the first campus housing dedicated specifically for women students. Landladies had a preference for male tenants as they believed they required less housework, especially starching and ironing, and believed young men had pastimes that more often took them out of their lodgings.

Fitzgerald was an accomplished marksman in the Volunteer Rifles, and ran evening classes for the Caledonian Society of Otago, which awarded him life membership for his contributions.

William and Annie Fitzgerald had a total of eight children together, including twins James and William (1862), who both became doctors. Fitzgerald died on 27 January 1920, just less than a year after his wife. He is buried with her in Andersons Bay Cemetery, Dunedin. In 1921 a plaque and photograph of Fitzgerald were unveiled at St Margaret's College.

== Honorific eponym ==
Mount Fitzgerald, on Banks Peninsula, is named after Fitzgerald.
