= New Zealand Educational Institute =

New Zealand education trade union

NZEI
- New Zealand Educational Institute Te Riu Roa
- Te Riu Roa
- Founded: 1883
- Headquarters: Wellington, New Zealand
- Location: New Zealand
- Members: 50,000
- Key people: Mark Potter, President; Stephanie Mills, National Secretary
- Affiliations: Education International
- Website: www.nzei.org.nz

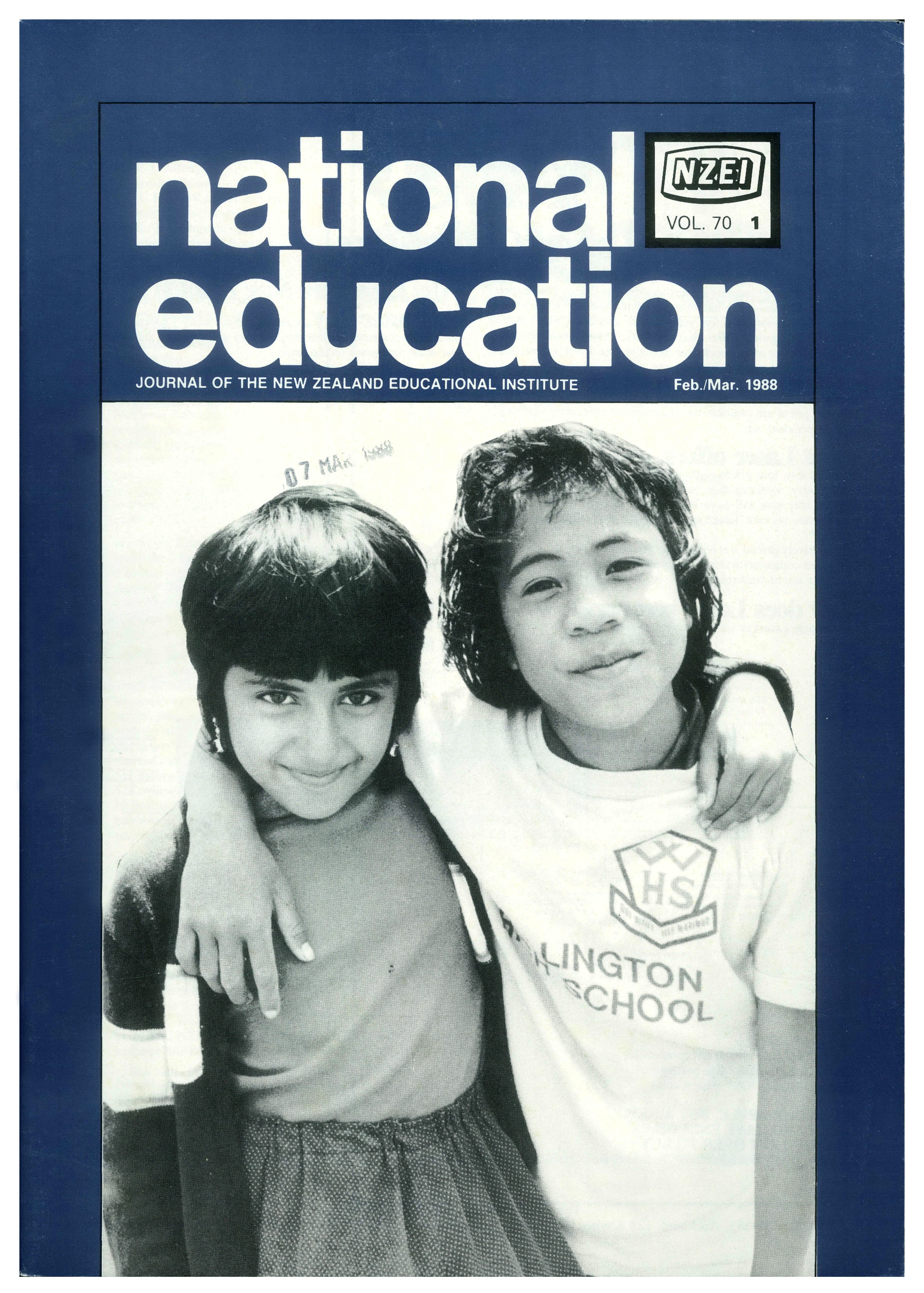
NZEI's National Education journal from 1988

The New Zealand Educational Institute (NZEI; in Māori: Te Riu Roa) is the largest education trade union in New Zealand. It was founded in 1883 and has a membership of 50,000.

== History ==
The NZEI was founded by a merger of district institutes of teachers in 1883 at a meeting in Christchurch. Although most of the groundwork for the organisation of regional institutes into a national body was performed by William Fitzgerald, head of the Dunedin Training College, he was unable to attend the meeting at which the NZEI was officially formed, leaving that work to his colleague David Renfrew White. The first president, serving from 1883–85, was Henry Worthington, headmaster of Wellesley Street School in Auckland. Fitzgerald served as president from 1885 to 1886, and was followed by George Hogben.

Under the leadership of Frank Livingstone Combs and others, it became the nationwide voice of primary school teachers. The first woman to be president was Margaret Magill, who was elected in 1933. The second was Vera Hayward in 1952. Since the 1994 merger with the Combined Early Childhood Union of Aotearoa (CECUA) the NZEI has also represented teachers in early childhood centres. Since the major New Zealand employment law changes in the 1980s and 1990s, the NZEI negotiates the more than twenty collective agreements across the two sectors, including principals, teachers, support staff, te reo Maori immersion staff and Ministerial staff.

In late July 2025, the NZEI sought a judicial review at the Wellington High Court of the New Zealand Government's decision to reduce funding for literacy and Māori resource teachers during the 2025 New Zealand budget, which was released in May 2025.

== Early childhood education ==
Due to the relatively fragmented history and nature of early childhood education in New Zealand, the largest number of collective agreements negotiated by the NZEI are in this sector.

== Primary schools ==
Primary staff and principals are on separate collective agreements, with separate agreements for area (rural) staff and principals, but these are negotiated together.

== Strikes ==
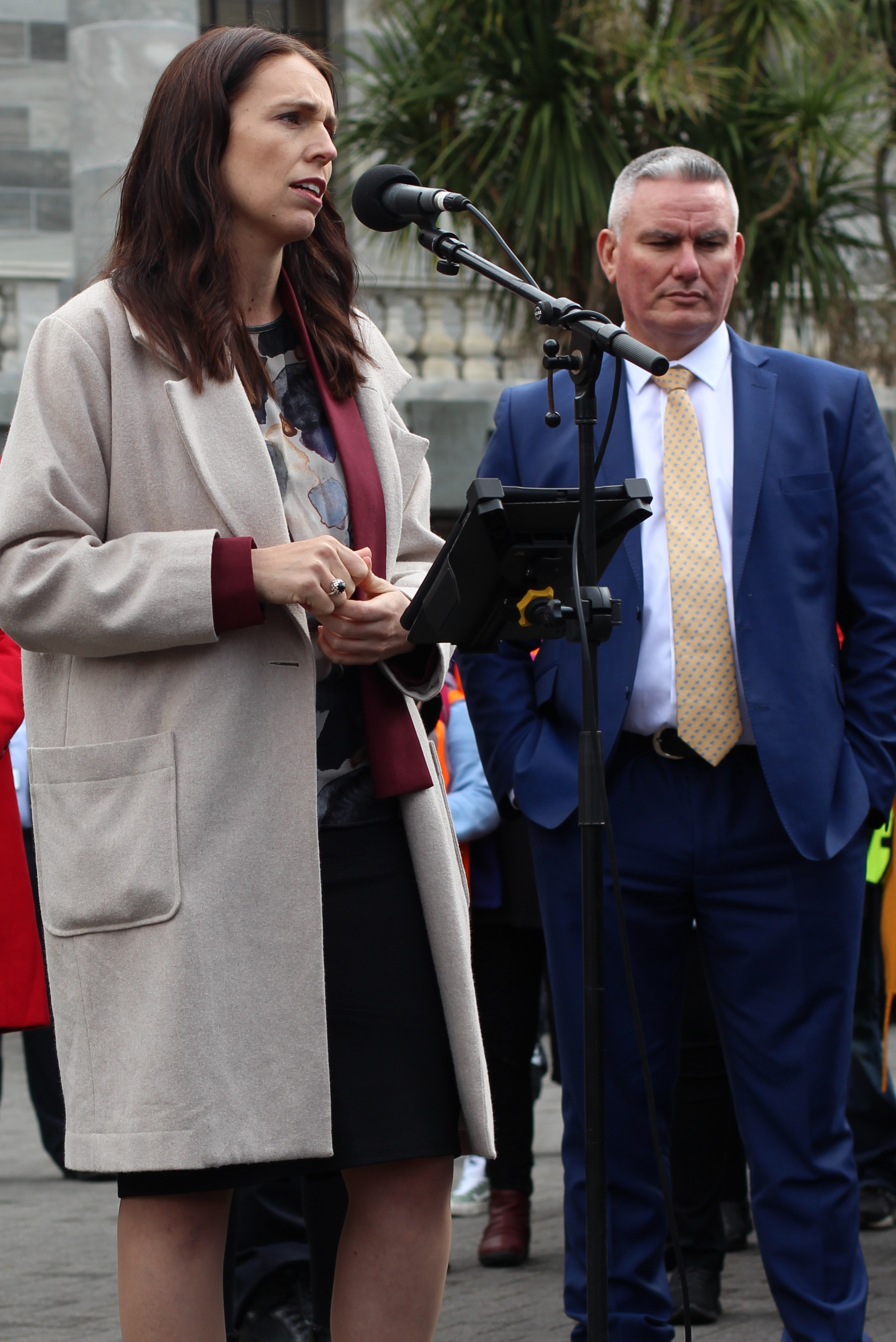
Prime Minister Jacinda Ardern at NZEI Te Riu Roa strike rally on the steps of parliament 15 August 2018

The NZEI has struck four times since it was founded in 1883.

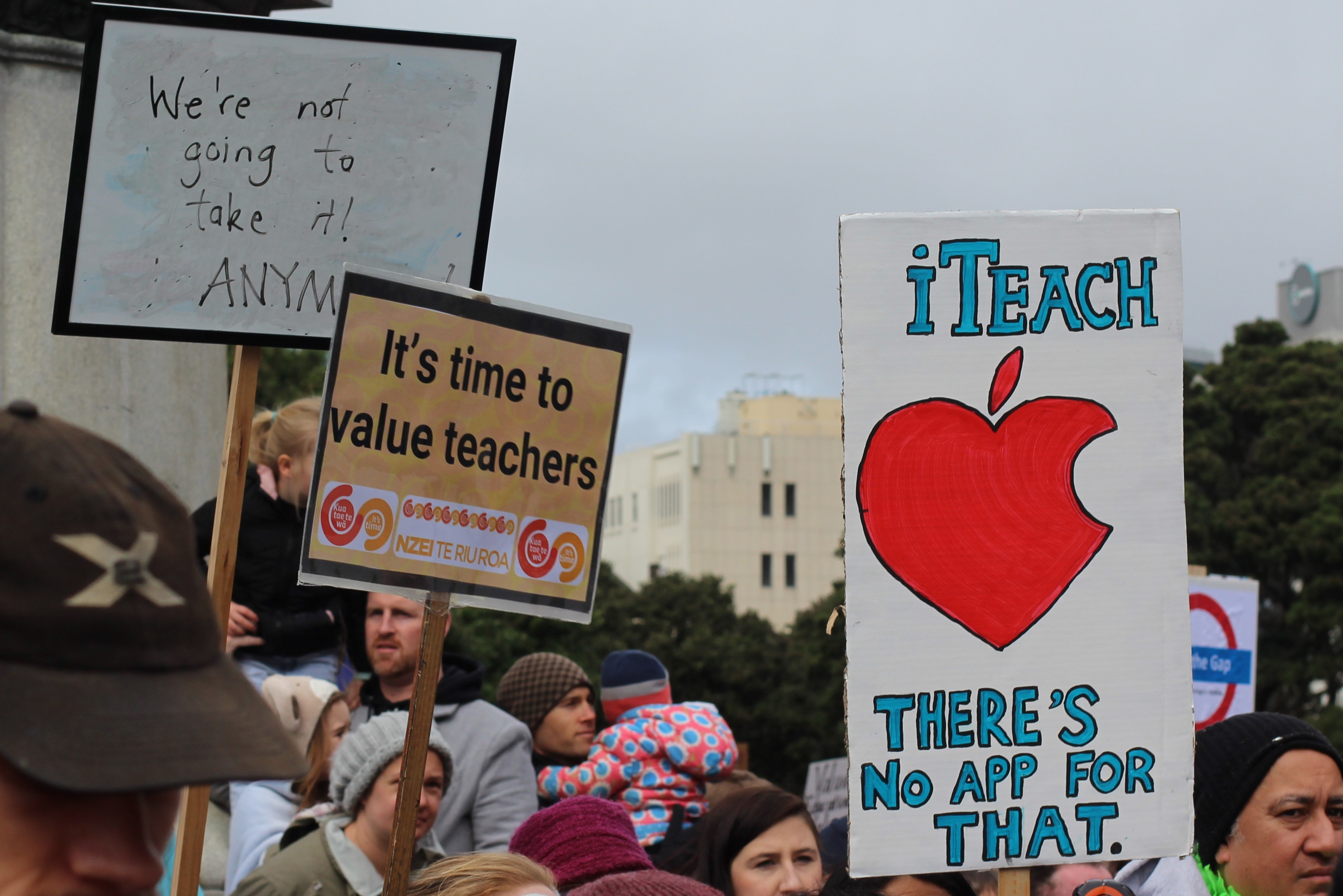
Placards at NZEI Te Riu Roa strike rally on the steps of parliament 15 August 2018. The placards read "We're not going to take it ANYMORE", "It's time to value teachers" and "iTeach, there's no app for that".

In 1991 members struck (unsuccessfully) as part of wider industrial and union action against the Employment Contracts Act 1991, which led to significant changes in New Zealand employment relations.

Members struck in 1994 and 1995 to successfully achieve pay parity with the Post Primary Teachers' Association (PPTA), their colleagues in secondary schooling. This related pay scales to the teachers' qualifications.

Members struck in 2018 as part of the negotiation round with the Sixth Labour Government of New Zealand. Rallies and marches were held in the major cities. On 29 May 2019, the NZEI and the PPTA staged a "mega-strike" demanding higher salaries, rejecting the Government's three-percent pay rise offer.

On 26 June 2019, primary school teachers voted to accept the Government's NZ$1.5 billion collective agreement. Key provisions of the collective agreement included a new pay scale, raising all teachers' base salaries by 18.5% by July 2021, and made Q3+, Q4, and Q5 teachers eligible for a new top salary of NZ$90,000. However, primary principals rejected the offer, regarding the government's offer as insufficient.

On 26 July 2019, the New Zealand Educational Institute's early childhood teacher members voted to accept a collective agreement with the Ministry of Education that put early childhood teachers' pay on par with primary and secondary school teachers. As part of the terms, early childhood teachers received a pay rise of at least 18.5% by July 2020, NZEI members received a lump sum of NZ$1,500, head and senior teacher allowances increased, and a new top step of NZ$90,000 was introduced. While the NZEI negotiates on behalf of all early childhood teachers in New Zealand, only 12.5% of the early childhood workforce were union members in 2019.
