= John Bevan Ford =

New Zealand artist (1930–2005)

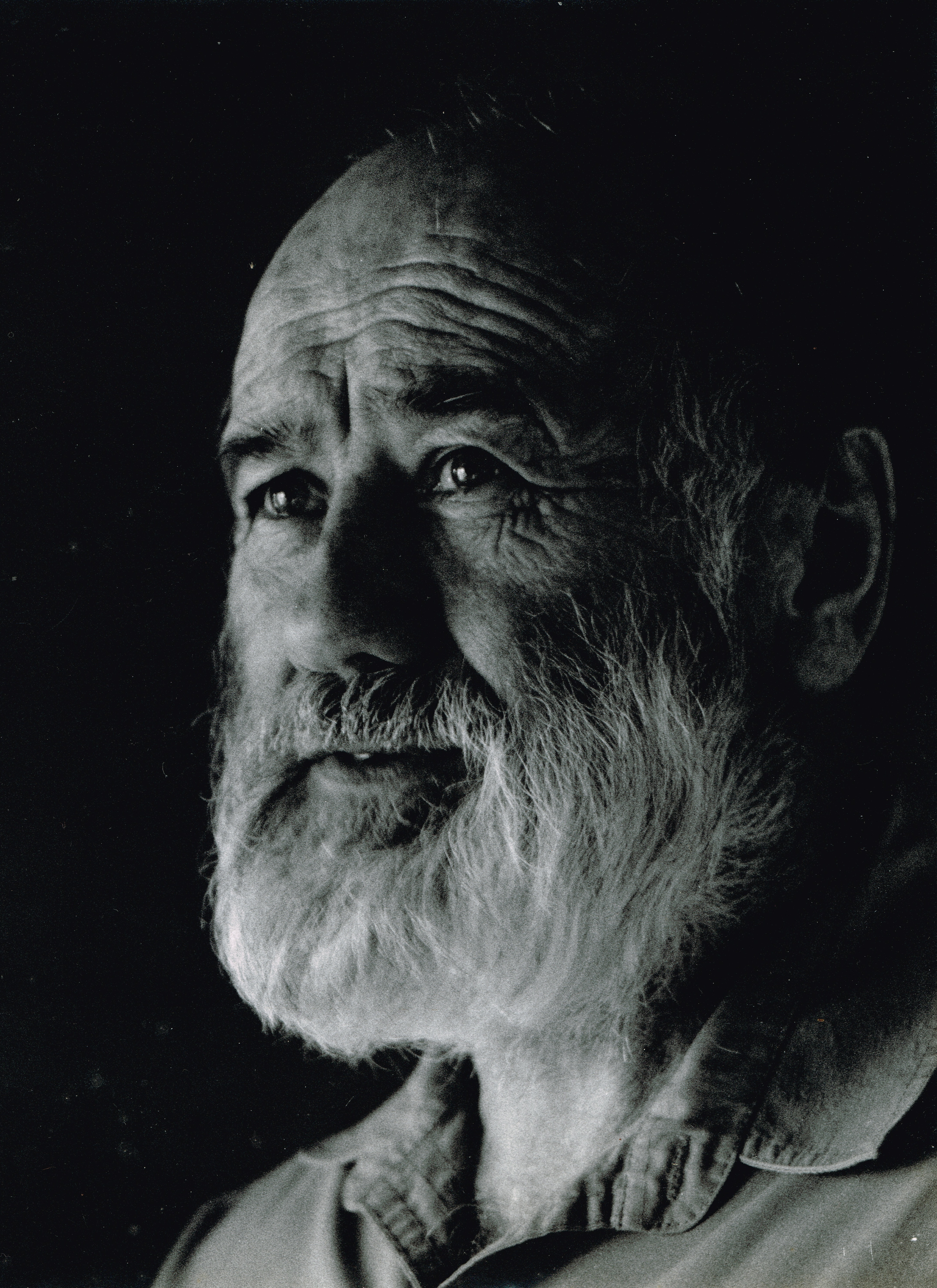
- John Bevan Ford in 1984
- Born: 18 April 1930; Christchurch, New Zealand
- Died: 16 September 2005 (aged 75); Palmerston North, New Zealand
- Education: Wellington Teachers' College
- Known for: Painting, carving
- Notable work: Te Marae O Hine (Palmerston North)
- Style: Intricate ink drawings of landscape and kahu / cloak forms based on Māori weaving and carving

John Bevan Ford (18 April 1930 – 16 September 2005) was a New Zealand Māori artist and educator who started exhibiting in 1966. He is a leading figure in contemporary Māori art with art held in all large public collections of New Zealand. In 2005 Ford received the Creative New Zealand Te Waka Toi Kingi Ihaka Award.

== Early life and education ==
Ford was born in 1930 in Christchurch, New Zealand. He was Māori and affiliated to the Ngāti Raukawa tribe. He grew up in Christchurch although went to Wellington in his teenage years.

In 1948 Ford began teacher training at Wellington Teachers' College. After Wellington he was selected to go Dunedin Teachers' College to specialise in arts.

== Career ==
His teacher training coincided with Arthur Gordon Tovey's career, who developed the Department of Education's progressive drive for Māori and Western creativity in schools including employing advisors to go into schools. Ford was one of these district advisors to schools in arts and crafts from 1952 to 1969. Other Māori artists who were also district advisors included Cliff Whiting, Cath Brown, Kāterina Mataira, Sandy Adsett, Ralph Hotere, Paratene Matchitt, Fred Graham (sculptor), Muru Walters, and Marilyn Webb. This group and others were the beginning of contemporary Māori arts in New Zealand.

He began exhibiting in 1966, but at the same time he was an educator and taught at Hamilton Teachers' College in the late 1960s to the early 1970s.

In 1973 Ford was one of the people who was part of establishing the Māori Artists and Writers' Association (Nga Puna Waihanga).

He moved to Palmerston North and taught at Massey University, first in the University Extension Department on the adult education art courses. In 1984 he took a lecturer position in Māori studies. He developed two Māori art papers, one on 'traditional' Māori art and the other on 'contemporary' Māori art. From these papers his successor Bob Jahnke established the Massey University's Māori visual arts programme Toioho ki Āpiti, the first indigenous four-year fine arts degree programme anywhere in the world.

In 1988 Ford retired from teaching and academia to focus on his art.

Ford presented his work at the Metropolitan Museum of Art, New York through a series of lectures in 1990 (he was the first New Zealand artist to do so).

== Art ==
Ford is mostly known for his ink drawings of landscape and kahu (cloak - traditional Māori weaving). His paintings have been seen worldwide appearing in more than 20 solo exhibitions. His paintings reference the Māori art forms of kōwhaiwhai (which are rafter paintings of a wharenui / Māori meeting house) and whakairo (Māori carving patterns). Notable elements in his work are cloaks floating above significant landforms and pacific rim works where symbols from indigenous pacific rim countries are laid out against outlines of the land. His use and research of kōwhaiwhai puts him alongside other contemporary Māori artists who also explored kōwhaiwhai in their art including Paratene Matchitt, John Hovell and Sandy Adsett. Pine Taiapa was someone who taught Ford in this area. Cloaks are used by Ford in many of his artworks. This represents, 'ancestral lineage as well as sacred, collective and personal history...'.

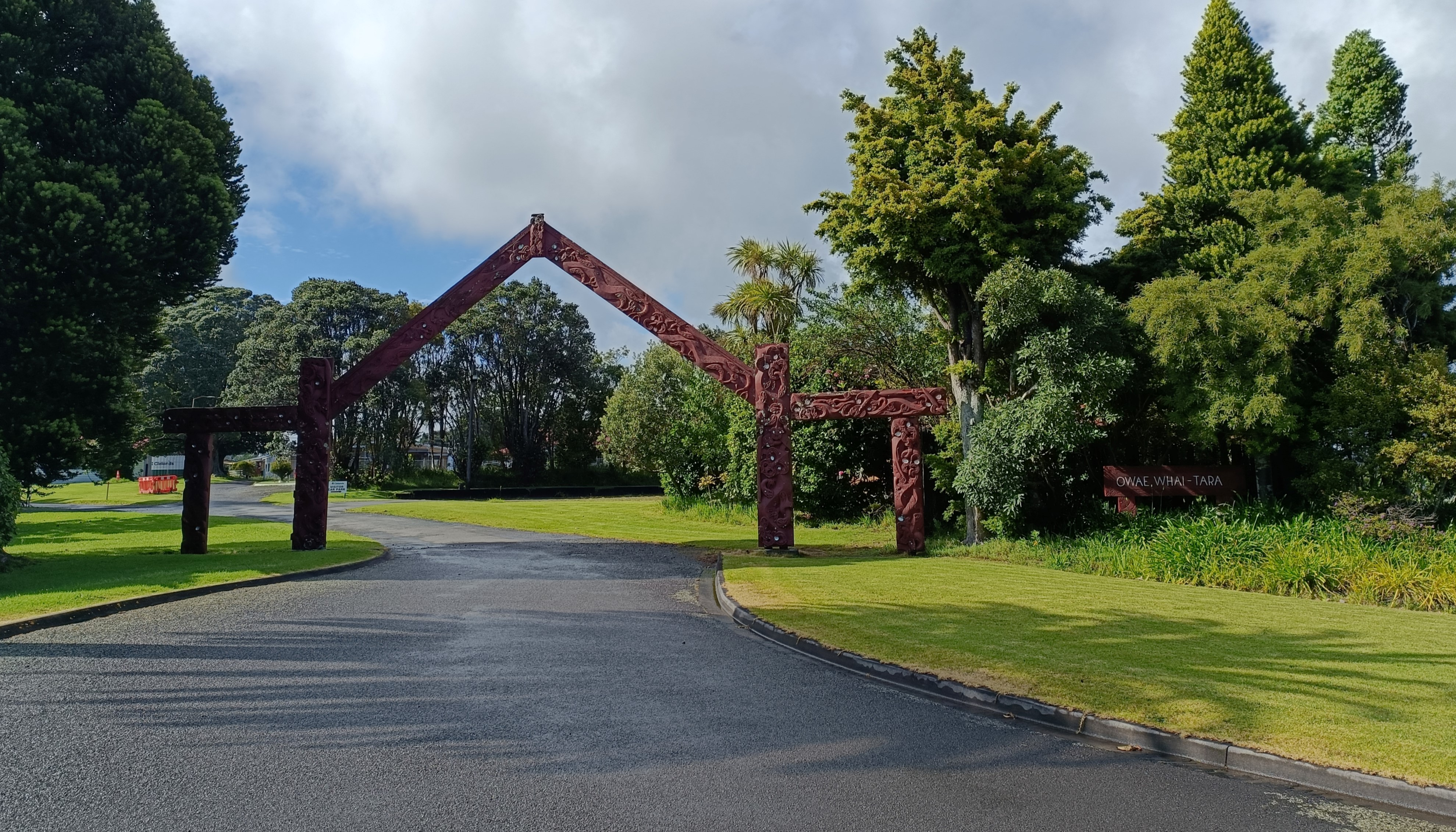
Ōwae marae gateway, Waitara

Notable carvings by Ford are the Gateway at Ōwae Marae, Waitara and the Meeting House, Te Aroha o Aohanga in Wairarapa.

Ford designed a logo and artwork that was incorporated into the Palmerston North City Library.

In the Raglan exhibition catalogue of Māori Artists of the South Pacific (1984) Ford said: "Even when not used directly, the proven symbols of the past provide models by which new symbols may be judged."

His work is featured in the collections of:

- The British Museum
- The Ethnological Museum of Berlin
- The Linden Museum
- The Fries Scheepvaart Museum
- The National Gallery of Australia
- The Auckland Art Gallery
- Te Papa
- Te Manawa
- Puke Ariki

== Exhibitions & residencies ==
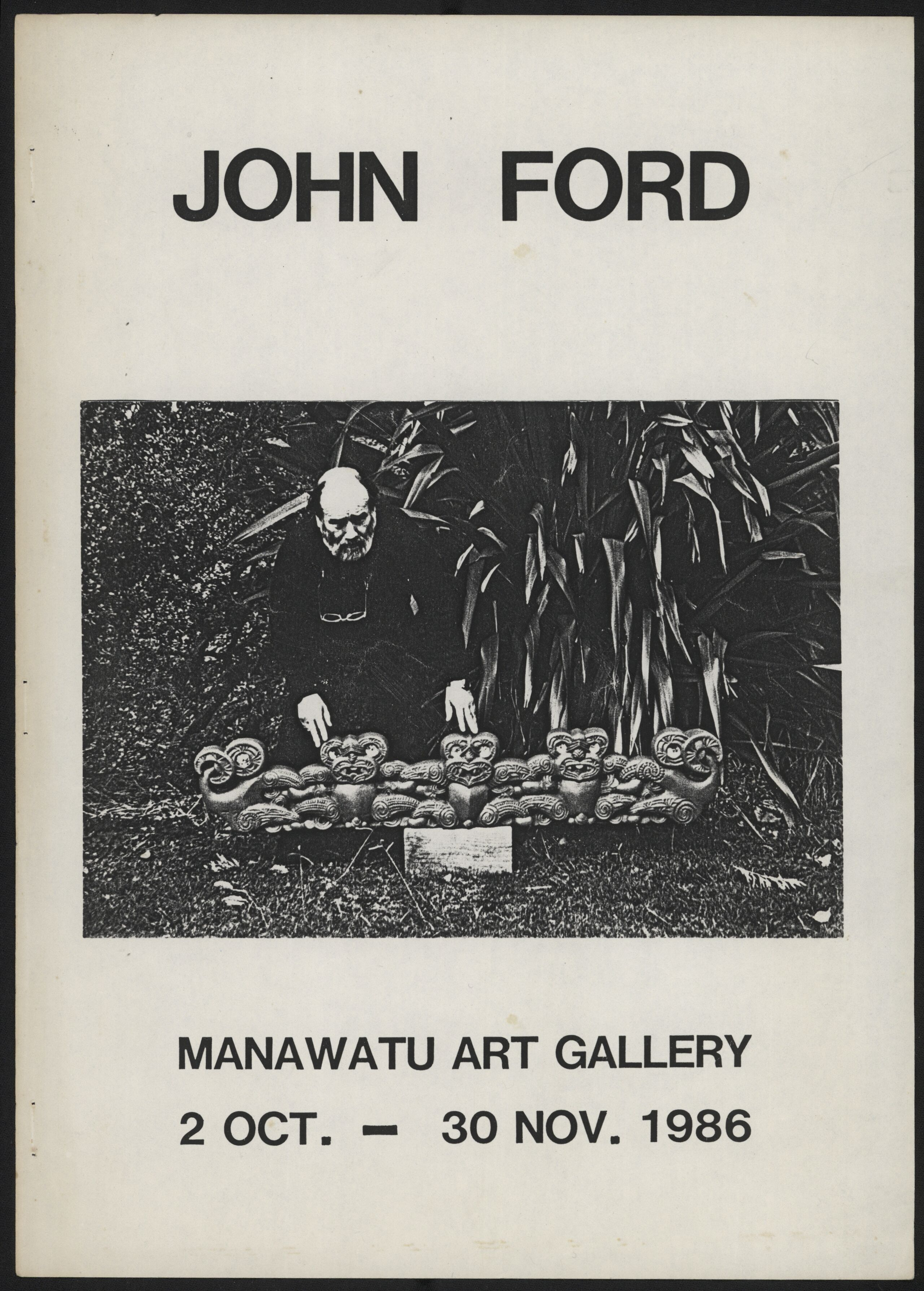
John Ford Manawatū Art Gallery exhibition programme cover

Selected exhibitions:

- Contemporary Maori Art, National Art Gallery, Wellington (1966)
- John Ford, solo exhibition, Te Manawatū Art Gallery, Palmerston North (1986)
- Whatu Aho Rua, Sergeant Gallery, Whanganui (1989)
- Solo exhibition, Dowse Art Museum, Lower Hutt (1990)
- Kohia ko Taikaka Anake, National Art Gallery, Wellington (1990)
- Te Waka Toi: Contemporary Maori Art, (tour to the United States) (1992)
- To Horo ki Zealandia Nova, Gallery Langenberg, Netherlands (1992)
- Artist in residence, British Museum's Māori art exhibition (1998)
- He Aho Tangata: the human threads, solo exhibition, Te Manawatū Art Gallery, Palmerston North (2008)
- Toi Tū Toi Ora: Contemporary Māori Art, Auckland Art Gallery (Sat 5 Dec 2020 – Sun 9 May 2021)

== Honours and awards ==
John Bevan Ford was awarded the Creative New Zealand Te Waka Toi Kingi Ihaka Award (2005) in acknowledgement of his leadership and outstanding contributions to Māori art.
