= Dunedin College of Education =

Predecessor to University of Otago College of Education

- Former names: Dunedin Training College; Dunedin Teachers' College
- Motto: maxima debetur pueris reverentia
- Motto in English: the child deserves the greatest respect
- Type: Public teacher training college
- Active: 1876–2007
- Location: Dunedin, New Zealand
- Campus: Urban

The Dunedin College of Education (Te Kura Akau Taitoka, also known as Dunedin Training College and Dunedin Teachers' College) was a former teacher training college in Dunedin, New Zealand. Founded in January 1876, the college was the oldest teacher training college in New Zealand. In 2007, it merged with the University of Otago's Faculty of Education to form the University of Otago College of Education. The Dunedin College of Education's motto was maxima debetur pueris reverentia (the child deserves the greatest respect).

== History ==
The Dunedin College of Education's roots can be traced back to the Dunedin Training College, which was established in 1876 to provide training for primary school teachers. It was the first such training college established in New Zealand. The Presbyterian scholar, educator, historian, and social worker Dr John Hislop is regarded as the "godfather" of the Dunedin Training College. The first rector of the Training College was W.S. Fitzgerald, and the second was David Renfrew White. Over the next decades, the Dunedin Training College continued supplying teachers to primary schools. During the First World War, it functioned as a secondary school to meet the shortfall in the new students' knowledge base.

Laboratory training, 1939

During the Great Depression, the Dunedin Training College was closed down in January 1933 due to austerity measures. The college remained closed until 1936 when it was reopened by the newly elected First Labour Government, which adopted Keynesian social security policies. During the post-World War II baby boom, the Dunedin Training College supplied both primary and secondary teachers to meet the growing population demand. In 1953, the Dunedin Training College was renamed the Dunedin Teachers' College to reflect a nationwide naming trend for similar teacher training facilities throughout New Zealand.

During the post-war period, the college expanded its teacher education programmes to include undergraduate and postgraduate degrees and graduate diplomas in early childhood, primary and primary bilingual and secondary teacher education. In 1980, the college established a satellite campus in Invercargill. In addition, teacher support services were established at its Dunedin and its Invercargill campus. In 1976, the college cooperated with the University of Otago's Faculty of Education to provide a four-year joint Bachelor of Education degree. In 1989, the college was renamed the Dunedin College of Education.

By 2006, the Dunedin and Christchurch colleges were the only teacher training colleges in the country not to have merged with a university. In 2002, the Dunedin College of Education and University of Otago entered into merger talks to address the duplication of courses and programs. In August 2006, the Tertiary Education Minister Michael Cullen formally approved the merger of the two educational institutions, which came into effect in January 2007. Following the merger, the newly created University of Otago College of Education acquired the Dunedin College's former campuses and the Robertson Library, which is shared with Otago Polytechnic. The former Dunedin College's archives are stored at the Hocken Collections.

== Art education ==
Art class, 1939.

Dunedin College of Education has had a special focus on art education since its early days. Initially the College shared a building on Moray Place with the Dunedin School of Art, and from 1876 teacher trainees were taught drawing by David Con Hutton and Miss Wright, using the South Kensington System. Much emphasis was placed on drawing technique, with students learning by drawing from Hutton's large collection of plaster casts or by copying printed works. In 1895, classes focusing on early childhood education included plasticine modelling, paperfolding and paper cutting. Hutton retired in 1908, and his successor Robert Hawcridge followed a similar programme. In 1922 Robert Donn was appointed Senior Lecturer in Art at the College, and bringing new ideas about art education programmes that included a greater range of media. Alumni from this period include Stewart Bell Maclennan and Alexander Hare McLintock, and Harry Vye Miller, who was later appointed as faculty. From 1927, all College students were able to extend their learning by specialising in a particular subject, including art, in their third year.

The first New Zealand-born and -trained art teacher at the College was Ivy Copeland, who joined the staff at the reopening after the depression in 1935. In 1941, Gordon Tovey was appointed as head of art at the College, having served as Head of the Dunedin School of Art since 1936. Art education for teachers was still based mainly on the South Kensington system, which had been designed to increase the professional skills of artists and designers. During the 1930s, Franz Cizek's theories around the importance of child-led art gained traction, and Tovey was the first to introduce these ideas to New Zealand. He began after-school art classes for children and, alongside alumna and lecturer Myra Kirkpatrick, delivered community art programmes. In 1945 C. E. Beeby appointed Tovey to chair a committee developing a national scheme for primary school art education, and Tovey subsequently moved to Wellington as National Supervisor of Arts and Crafts.

Alumni from this period include artist and illustrator Anne Hamblett, painter Elizabeth Stevens, cartoonist Neville Colvin, as well as Murray Stevenson, who succeeded Tovey and went on to become a long-serving head of the College art department. Margaret Lawlor-Bartlett graduated in 1949, and Fred Graham and John Drawbridge in 1951. More recently, alumni include Jeanne Macaskill, Cath Brown, Kāterina Mataira, Jean Stewart, Ralph Hotere, Cliff Whiting, Paratene Matchitt, Marilynn Webb, Stanley Palmer, Grant Tilly, James Mack, Yvonne Sloan, and Bridie Lonie.

== Bicultural and multicultural programmes ==
The College launched a Māori language and cultural programme in 1974, through a final-year course taught by Muru Walters, from the art department. A one and a half week Māoritanga course was added in 1976 and made compulsory for third year students. The course utilised the marae at Otago Museum. By 1980, the course had lengthened to 12 sessions, with Walters proposing that it should be developed into a Māori language development course running across all three years. A more general multicultural course was added to the College's offerings in 1985, as a three-year programme, and with a compulsory component for primary school teachers. A Māori language and culture unit was included in this in 1986, taught by Clive Arlidge. A Māori department was finally established in 1988, led until 1994 by Kiwa Brouwer, and later by Yvonne Brouwer. Concerns in the late 1980s about racist attitudes persisting among some graduating teachers led to the establishment of an immersion scheme, with students billeted in Polynesian families and seconded to multiethnic schools in the Hawkes Bay and Wellington. The scheme lasted only a few years due to cost. A bilingual course for primary teachers was offered from the Southland campus. Alumna Eti Laufiso was one of the staff involved in teaching multicultural studies in the early 1980s, and she returned in 1995, when she developed a diploma for Pacific Island early childhood education.

== Children's Writer in Residence ==
The College began offering the Children's Writer in Residence award in 1992, funded jointly by the College and a grant from the Queen Elizabeth II Arts Council (later Creative New Zealand). It is the only such residency offered to a children's writer by any tertiary institution in New Zealand, and is awarded for a six-month period between February and August each year. The award includes a stipend of $28,000, the use of an office within the College of Education, as well as library access and the option of free accommodation at the Robert Lord Writer's Cottage.

The first fellow was Ruth Corrin. By June 1998, when a Fellows Symposium was held in Dunedin, fellows included Diana Noonan, Paula Boock, Jack Lasenby and Ken Catran. In 2025 it was announced that Creative New Zealand had declined further funding, putting the future of the residency in doubt. The university announced it was fundraising, and later invited applications for the fellowship for 2027.

== Te Rama ==
The College published its own magazine, Te Rama, from 1936 until 1995. Although two magazine issues initially appeared in 1911, the magazine did not reappear or gain its formal title until after the College reopening in 1936. The magazine published poems and news about the College, including a College song in 1914 and a College Haka in the 50th Jubilee edition in 1926.

== Buildings ==
=== Moray Place ===
Dunedin Training College building in Moray Place, c1880s.

The Dunedin Training College opened as Moray Place Normal School on Moray Place on 24 January 1876, sharing premises with the Dunedin School of Art. The building housed 750 pupils across eight classrooms, and three basement play areas, which were asphalted and made as open as possible to compensate for the lack of an outdoor playground. It also had two further classrooms on the second floor dedicated to the Dunedin School of Art. Another Normal School was opened on Union Street in 1909, providing further classes for teacher training experience.

=== Cumberland Street ===
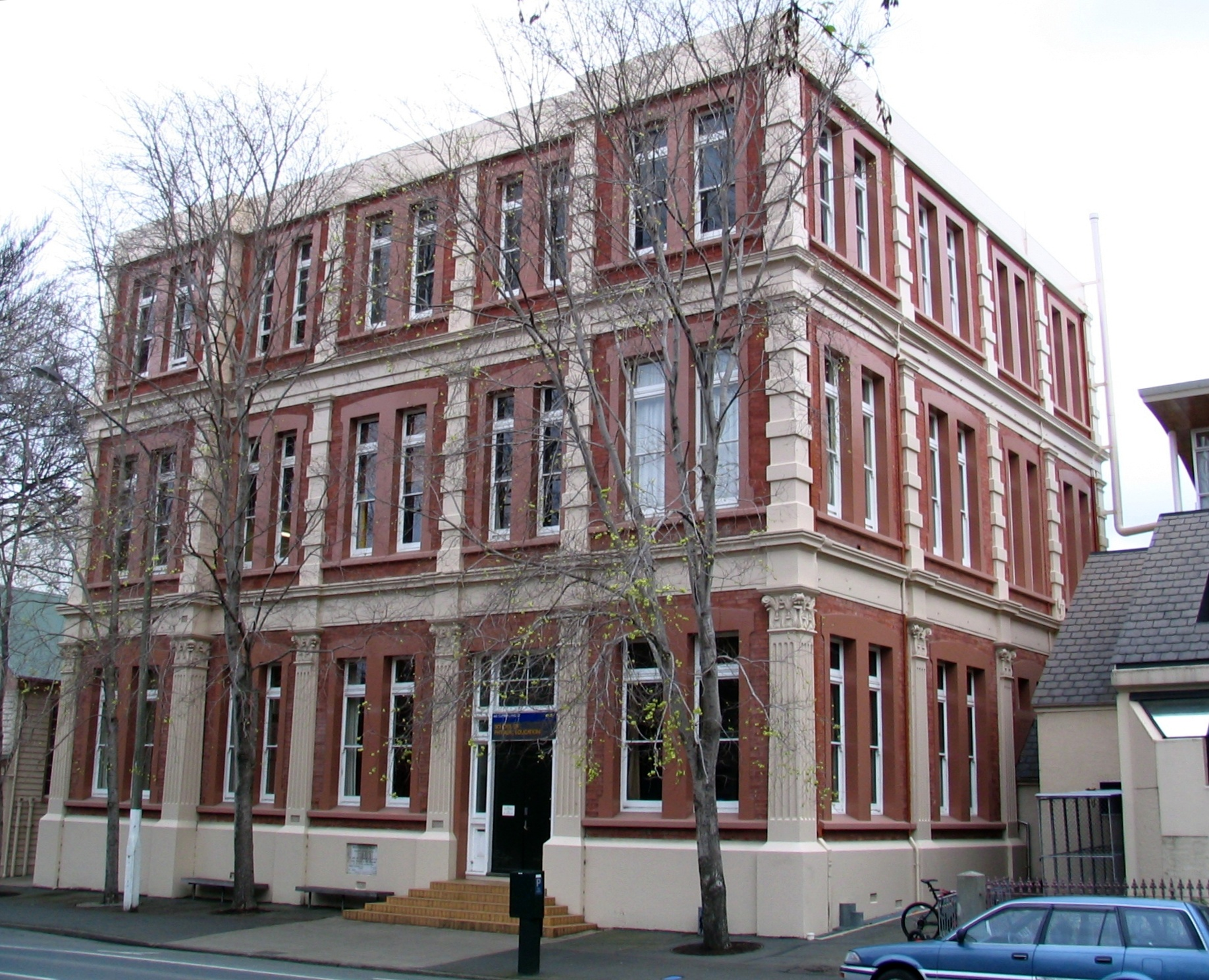
The Training College building on Cumberland Street opened in 1909 as a two-storey building, with a third storey added in 1921

The second building opened on 27 April 1909 on Cumberland Street, as a two-storey building to which another storey was added in 1921. This building was listed as a Heritage New Zealand Category 2 registered building in 1982. The architect, James Rodger, worked for the Otago Education Board and designed many school buildings. The original two-storey building with gabled roof was altered through the addition of a third storey with a flat roof in 1921, to accommodate growing numbers of student teachers. After the training college moved to Union Street in 1939 the Cumberland Street building was subsequently purchased by the Physical Education Department of the University of Otago.

=== Union Street ===
1939 wooden buildings on Union Street

In 1938, Cabinet approved a grant for new premises on Union Street. The new buildings, built out of wood to facilitate remodelling, were opened 11 September 1939. The hall was named after the chair of the Otago Education Board, James Wallace, whose efforts were viewed as pivotal to retaining teacher training in Dunedin. The normal classes at Union Street School closed in 1949, due to the unsafe state of the buildings, with most children transferring to George Street School, which later became a Normal School.

The wooden Union Street premises were destroyed by fire on 3 September 1968. The fire burned the three-storey administration block and lecture halls. Teams of students removed thousands of books from the college library to the lawn after the start of the fire, but in the end, although 70% of the college was destroyed, the library was not damaged. It was immediately announced that the college would be rebuilt on the existing site.

== Faculty ==
- Jan Bolwell
- Chris Charteris
- Ivy Copeland
- Williams Sanderson Fitzgerald
- David Con Hutton
- Charles Reed Laws
- Eti Laufiso
- Pip Laufiso
- Lance McCaskill
- Daphne Purves
- Olive Smithells
- Gordon Tovey
- Muru Walters
- David Renfrew White
- Farquhar Wilkinson
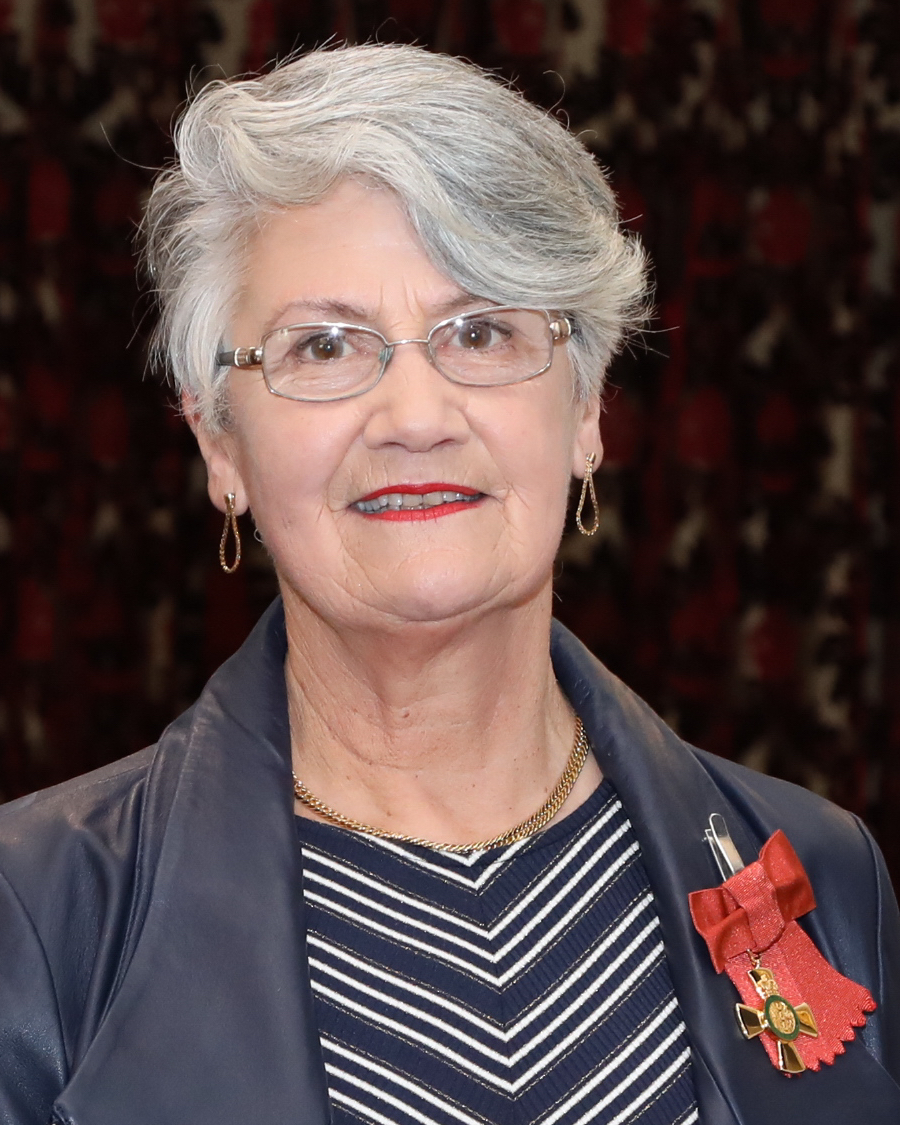
Jan Bolwell

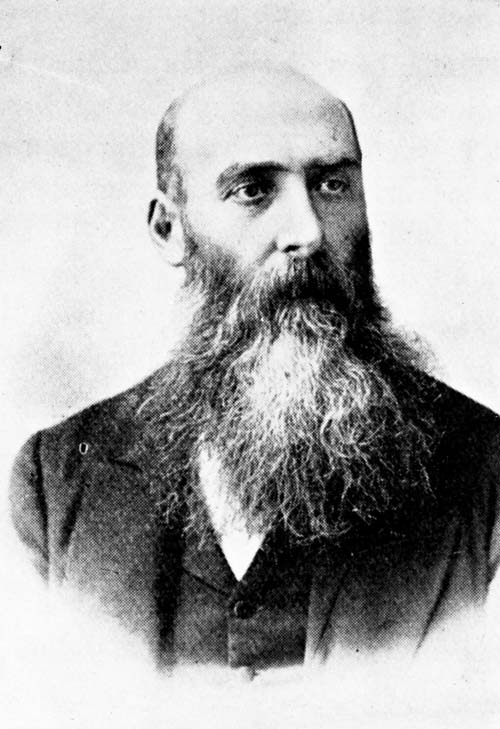
William Fitzgerald

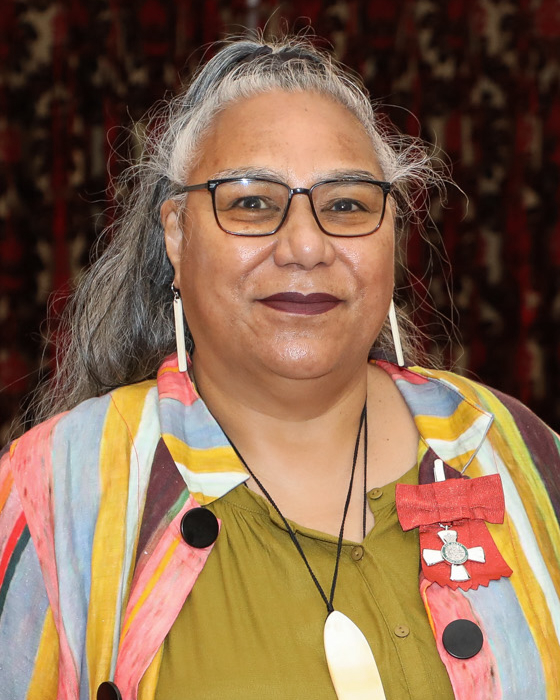
Pip Laufiso

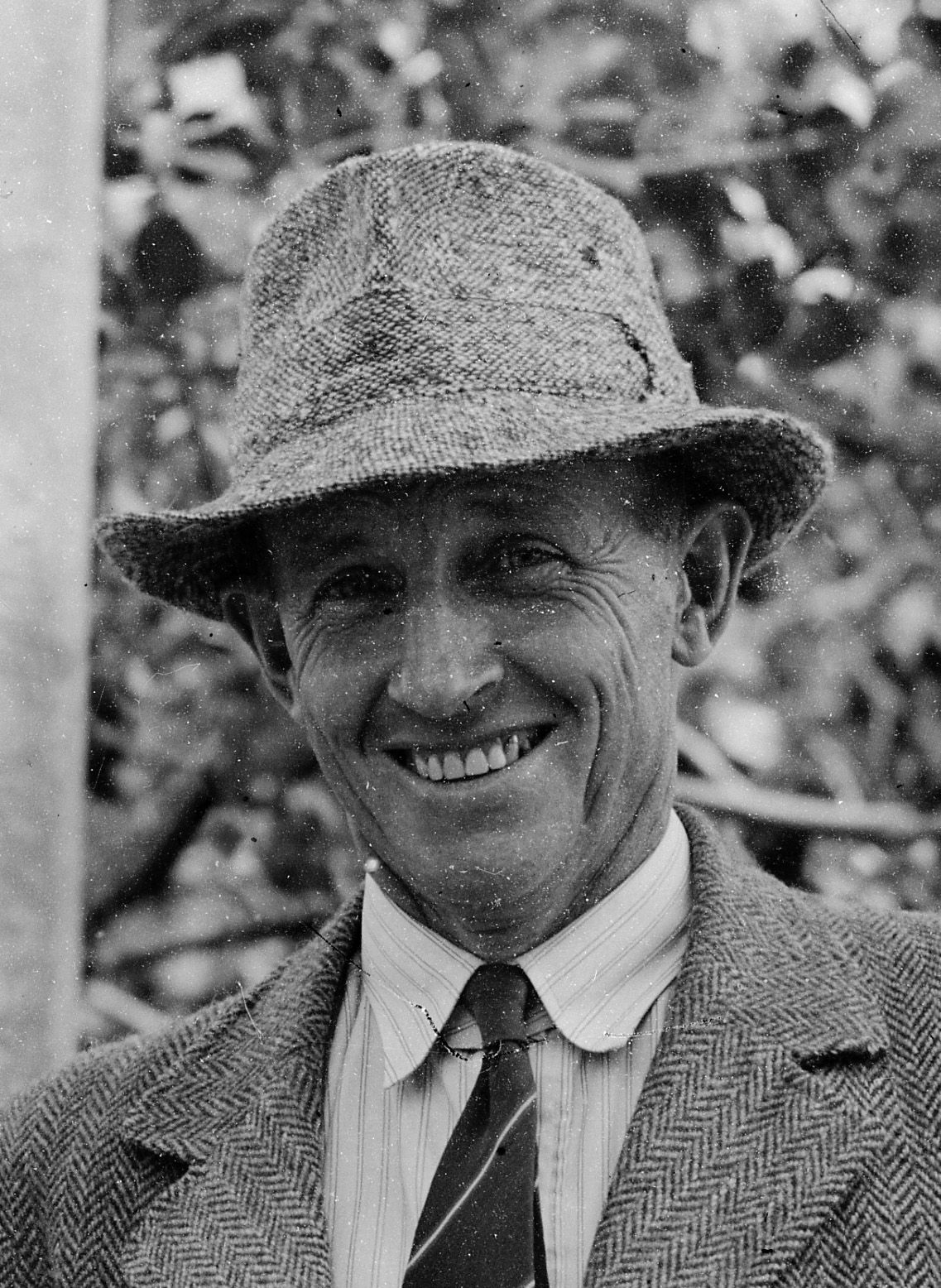
Lance McCaskill

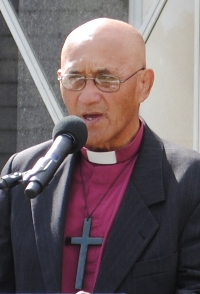
Muru Walters

== Alumni ==
- Sandy Adsett
- William Allan Armour
- Jean Begg
- Vera Burt
- Frank Callaway
- Ella Campbell
- Ian Colquhoun
- Neville Colvin
- Rona Dyer
- John Bevan Ford
- Janet Frame
- Fred Graham (sculptor)
- Vera Hayward
- Rose Henderson
- Ralph Hotere
- Arch Jelley
- Shona McFarlane
- Bernice Mene
- Phil Silva
- Elizabeth Stevens
- James Strachan
- Julie Syme
- Marion Thompson
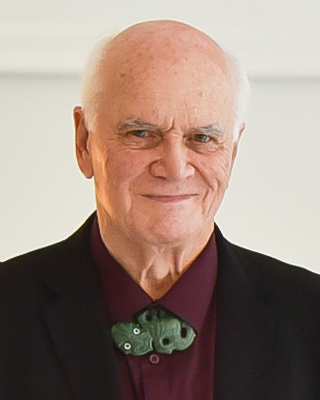
Sandy Adsett

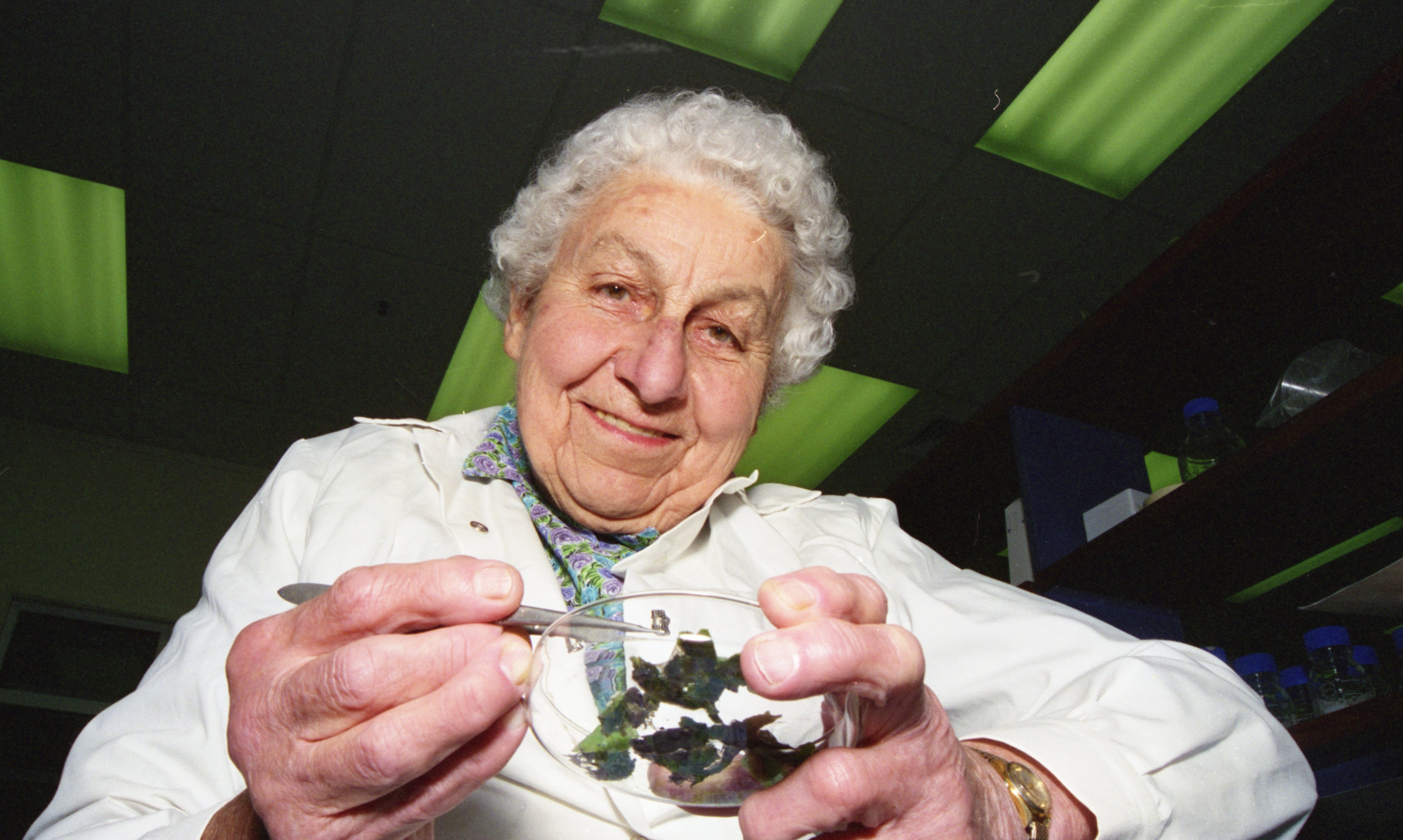
Ella Campbell

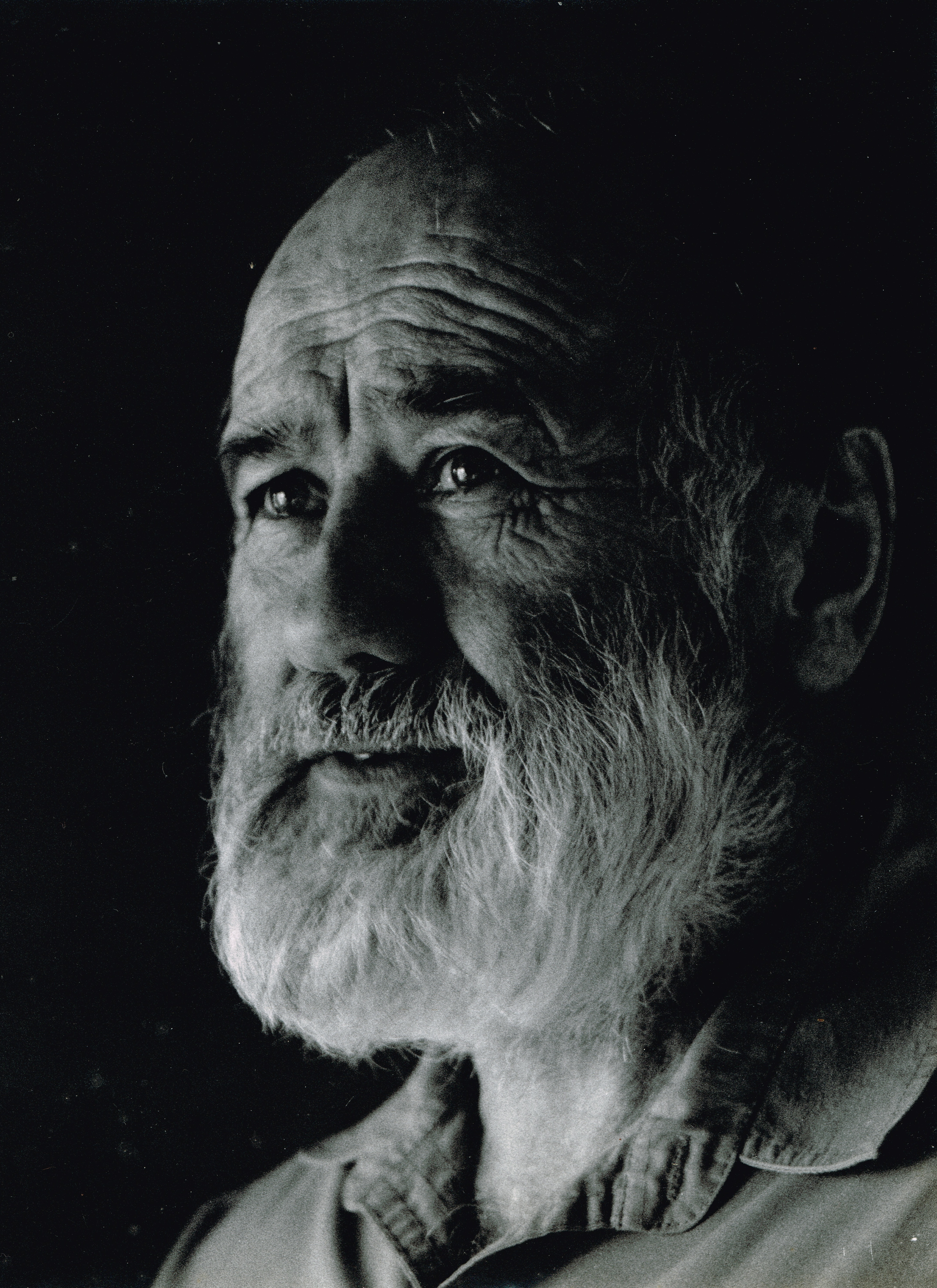
John Bevan Ford

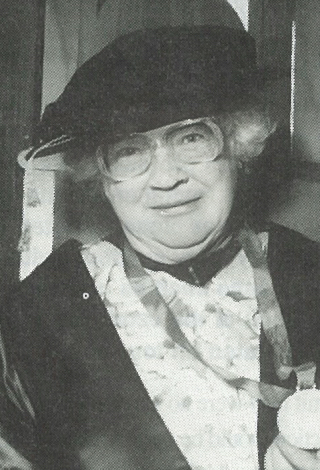
Janet Frame

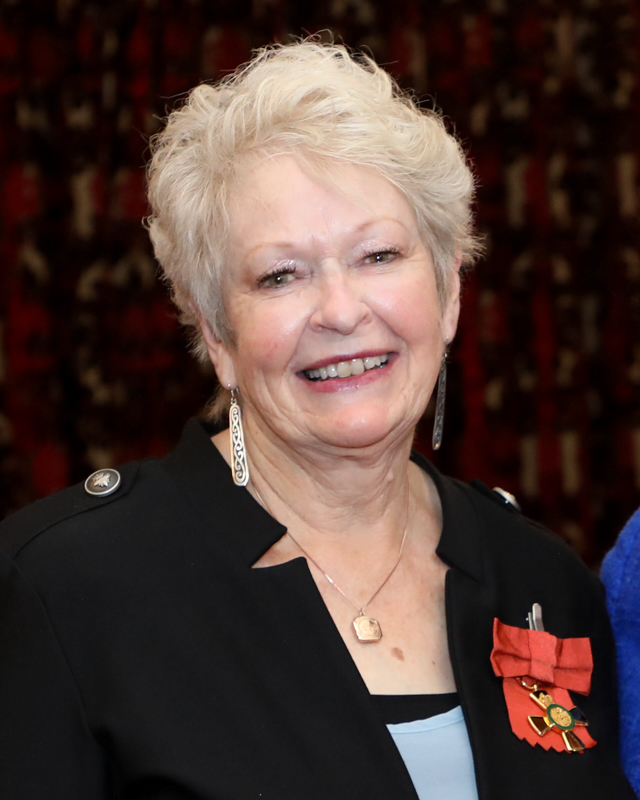
Rose Henderson

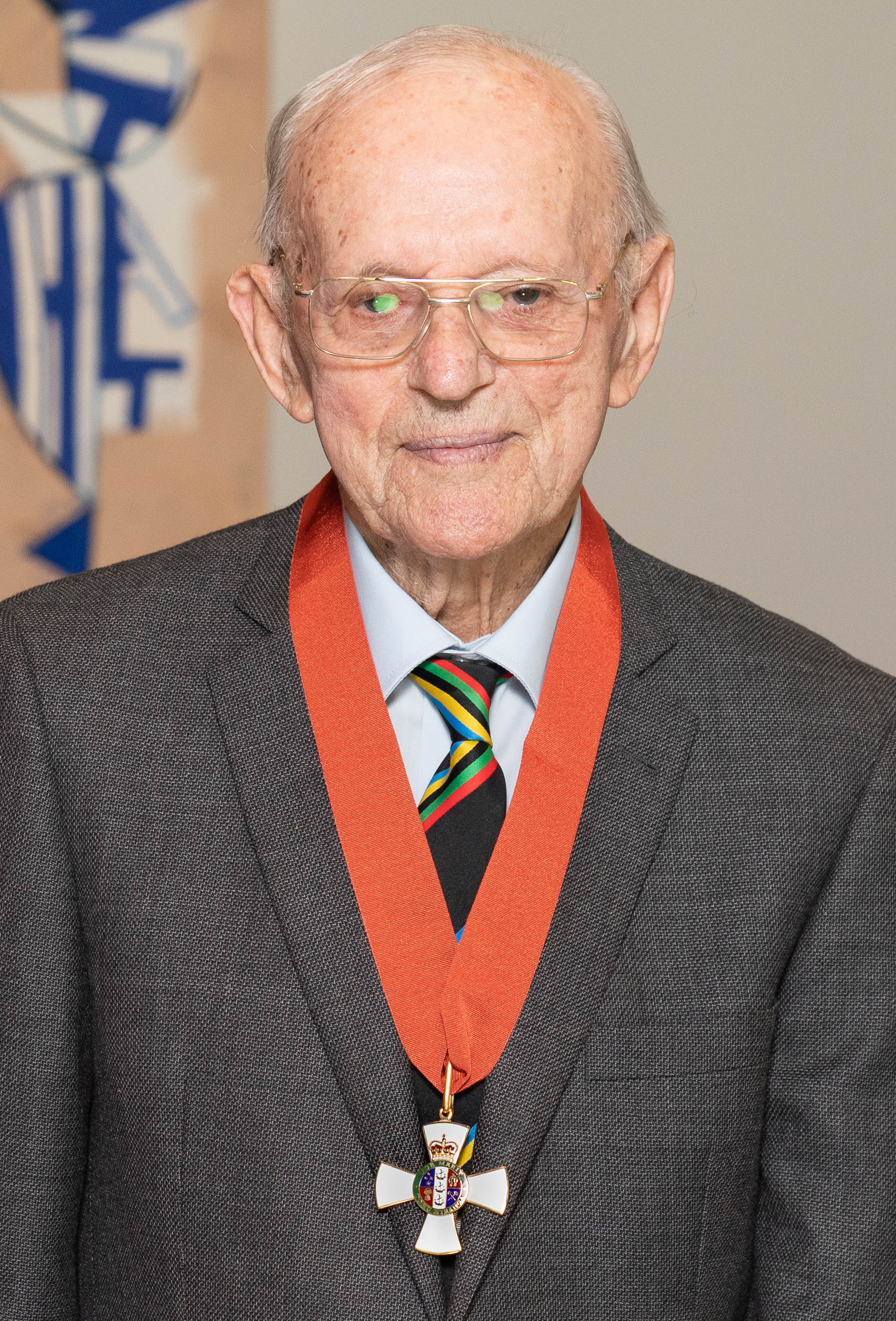
Arch Jelley

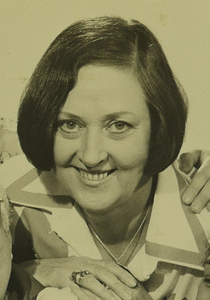
Shona McFarlane

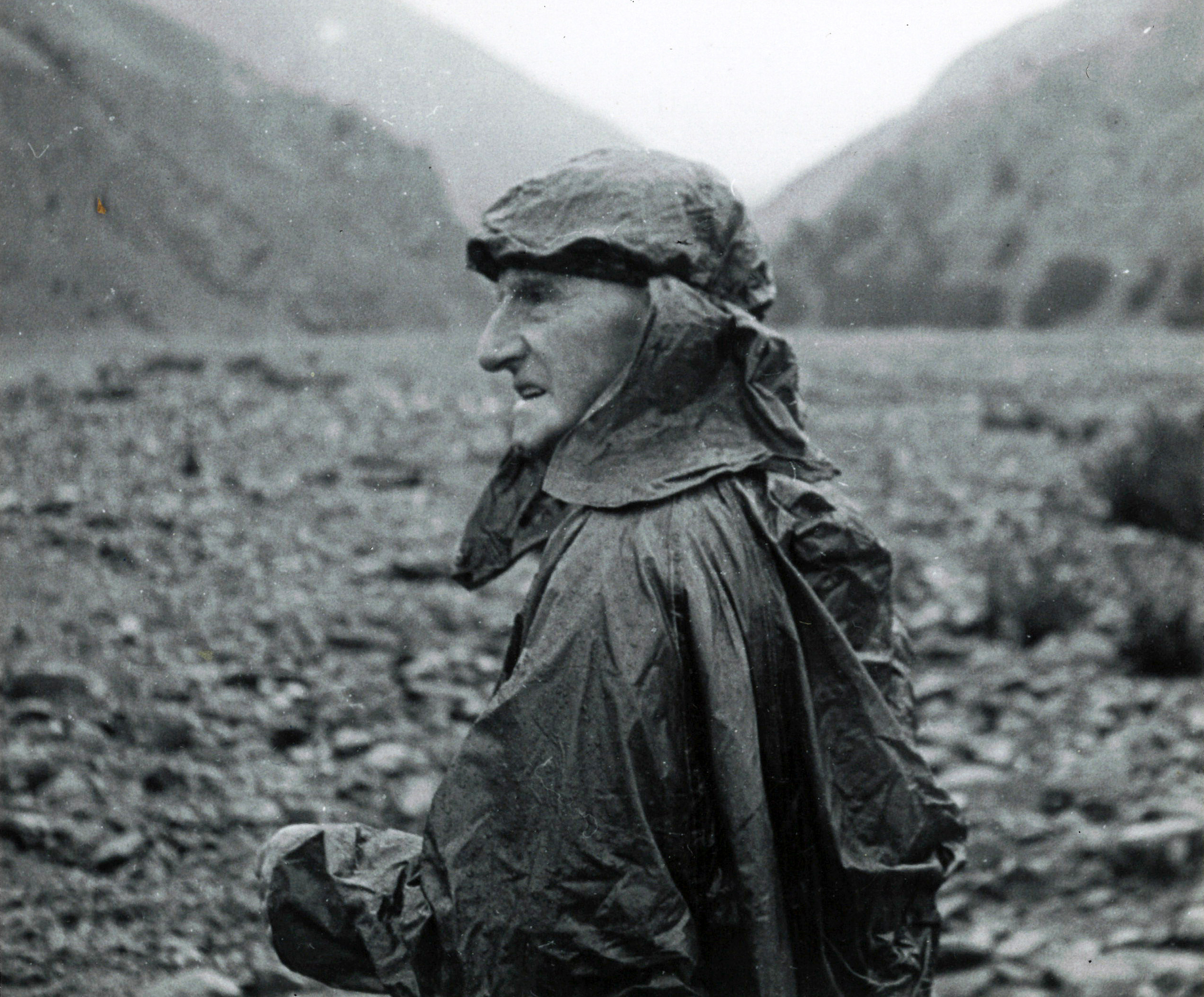
James Strachan

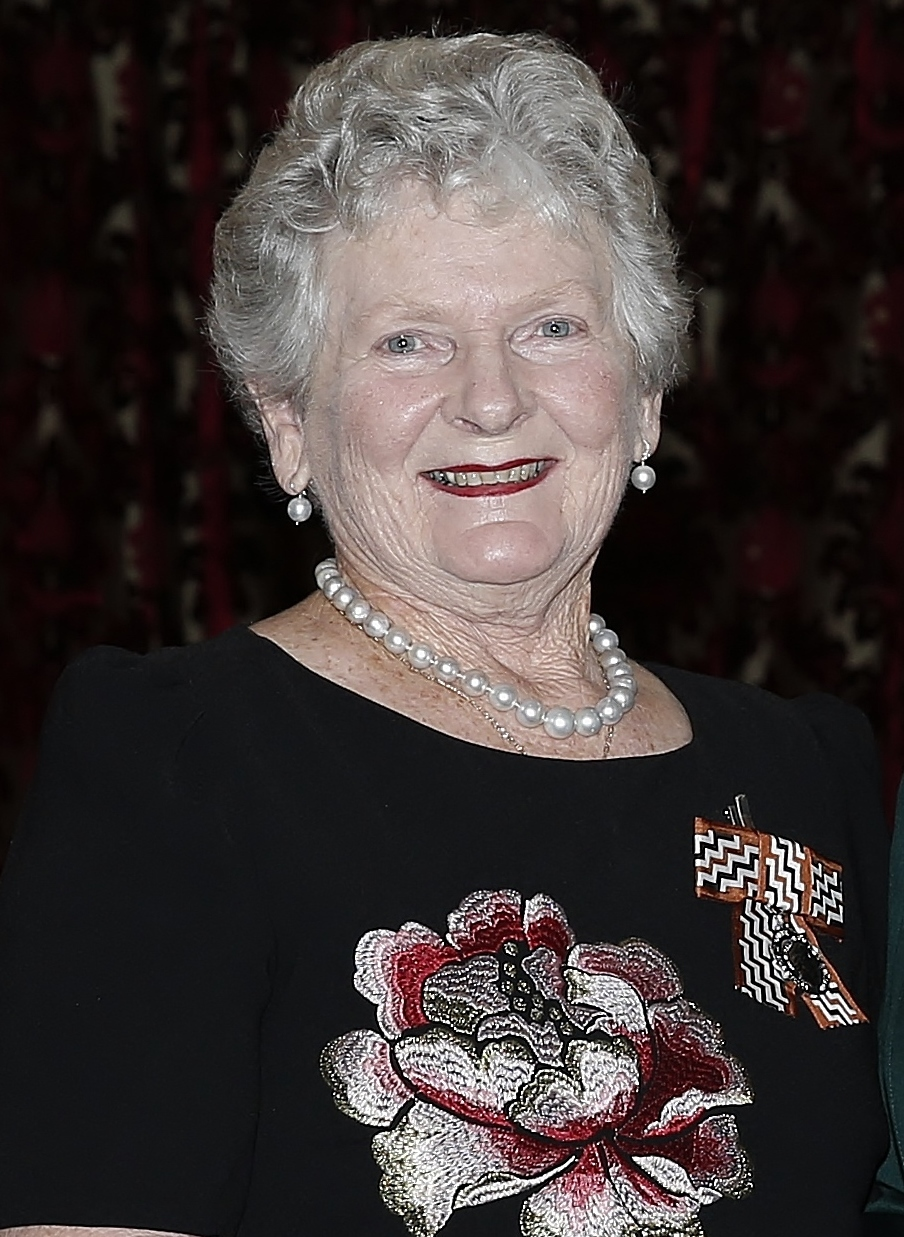
Julie Syme

Marion Thompson

== Notes and references ==
=== Works cited ===
- Bell, David (2000). "Art in education: an essay celebrating one hundred and twenty-five years of art education at the Dunedin College of Education". Bulletin of New Zealand Art History Special Series (5). ISSN 1172-9163. OCLC 155721179.
- Keen, David (2001). In a class of its own: The story of a century and a quarter of teacher education at the Dunedin Training College, Dunedin Teachers' College and the Dunedin College of Education. Dunedin: Dunedin College of Education. ISBN 9780473072629. OCLC 155440147.
- Morton Johnston, Carol; Morton, Harry (1976). Dunedin Teachers College: The First Hundred Years. Dunedin: John McIndoe, Dunedin Teachers College Publications Committee.
