= Elizabeth Little =

Elizabeth Little may refer to:

- Elizabeth Stevens (1923–2008, born Little), New Zealand artist
- Betty Little (born 1940), New York State Senator
- Elizabeth Little (tennis) (born 1960), Australian tennis player
