= David Con Hutton =

New Zealand artist and teacher (1843–1910)

- Born: 1843; Dundee, Scotland
- Died: 1910 (aged 66–67)
- Education: Dundee School of Art
- Occupations: painter, teacher

David Con Hutton (1843–1910) was a New Zealand painter and teacher.

Hutton was born in Dundee, Scotland, in 1843, and studied at the Dundee School of Art. He studied modelling, and gained several prizes and medals as a student. At the age of 17, in 1860, he published the 'Free Hand Drawing' series of booklets which were adopted for use in several schools in England and Scotland. After a series of teaching appointments, Hutton was appointed the role of Art Master at the Perth School of Art in 1865, where he remained until his departure for New Zealand in 1869.

Hutton arrived in Port Chalmers in 1870 with his wife Catherine and young son David Edward. Seven months after arrival, Catherine died at the age of 25. He later married Helen Douglas, from Edinburgh, and a further four sons and five daughters were born.

Hutton was the founding Art Master of the Dunedin School of Art, the first such art school in New Zealand, where he was principal until his death in 1910. From 1876, Hutton also taught drawing at the Dunedin Training College, which shared the same building.

His daughter Nellie Hutton also taught at the Dunedin School of Art, and exhibited her works in Otago.
