= Rona Dyer =

New Zealand artist

Rona Ina Dyer (1923–2021) was a New Zealand artist, working in wood-engraving, watercolours and oils. Her work was used to illustrate books and is also held in the permanent collections of Sarjeant Gallery in Whanganui and Christchurch Art Gallery. She was also known for mural design and painting.

== Biography ==
Dyer was born in Dunedin and attended Otago Girls' High School where she was taught by painters Lula Currie and Myra Kirkpatrick. These teachers recommended Dyer continue her studies at the School of Art at King Edward Technical College in Dunedin. She also studied art at the Central School of Art and Design and Goldsmith College in London.

Before the end of World War II, she began training as an art teacher at Dunedin Teachers' College and also studied education at the University of Otago.

Dyer exhibited watercolours, oil paintings, wood-engravings and a piece of sculpture at the Otago Art Society. She also exhibited at the London Society of Painters, Etchers and Engravers, the Society of Wood Engravers and the Royal Academy of Arts.

In the mid-1940s Dyer became interested in mural design and painting, and was commissioned to create murals in Wellington and Dunedin. In 1947 she won a national mural competition organised by the New Zealand Institute of Architects and judged by Cora Wilding and Ngaio Marsh, with an entry consisting of three panels on the theme of health. Following this success, she decided to study mural design with John Hutton at Goldsmith College in London. She was also taught by Gertrude Hermes.

In 1948, Caxton Press published a book of her wood-engravings. In 1995 the Otago Art Society held a retrospective exhibition of Dyer's works.

In 1999, the Hocken Library mounted an exhibition of the works of Dyer alongside two other Dunedin designers, Lily Daff and Eileen Mayo.

Dyer died in 2021 at the age of 99 at the Yvette Williams Home in Dunedin.

In 2024, two of Dyer's works were included in a Dunedin Public Art Gallery exhibition Transitions – Aotearoa to London, featuring the works of artists who spent time studying in London from the late-1940s to the mid-1960s.
