= Jean Begg =

New Zealand welfare worker, administrator, and feminist

Jean Begg CBE
- Jean Begg in 1931
- Born: 7 October 1886; Port Chalmers, Otago, New Zealand
- Died: 15 February 1971 (aged 84); Dunedin, New Zealand
- Occupations: Social worker, educator, YWCA executive

Jean Begg CBE (7 October 1886 – 15 February 1971) was a New Zealand welfare worker, educator, and YWCA administrator.

== Early life and education ==
Begg was born in Port Chalmers, Otago, New Zealand, one of the ten children of Scottish immigrants Eliza Johnstone and John Begg. Her father was a tanner and rug maker. She trained as a teacher at Dunedin Training College attended the University of Otago, and held a diploma in social work from Columbia University.

== Career ==
Begg was a teacher at a missionary school and ran a health clinic in American Samoa as a young woman, and helped to establish the Samoan Nursing Service. In 1922, she represented New Zealand at the world convention of the YWCA in Philadelphia.

She was general secretary of the Auckland YWCA from 1926 until 1931, when she became general secretary for the National YWCA for India, Burma, and Ceylon. Also in 1931, she headed New Zealand's delegation to the Pan-Pacific Women's Conference in Honolulu.

During and immediately after World War II, Begg was director of the YWCA in the Middle East and North Africa, setting up YWCA programs, including lodgings, weekly concerts in Egypt and a mobile library. She worked in Lord Louis Mountbatten's South-East Asia Command, at hospitals for former prisoners of war in Singapore, and served on the Middle East Welfare Council. "The problems that beset the world will never be solved unless they are approached in a spirit of helpfulness and sacrifice," she declared in a 1945 speech.

In 1946, Begg went to Tokyo for an ANZAC Day ceremony. In 1947, she was director of YWCA Welfare in Japan, and represented New Zealand at the YWCA World Council, held in Hangzhou, China. In 1948 and 1949, she worked in London, setting up Helen Graham House, a YWCA hostel.

Jean Begg had an audience with the Queen in 1943. She was appointed an MBE in 1943, an OBE in 1946, and a CBE in 1948.

== Personal life ==
Begg retired to New Zealand in 1952. She had a war pension, inherited a house, and died in 1971, aged 84 years, in Dunedin. She was given a military funeral at the soldiers' cemetery in Dunedin.
