= Ivy Copeland =

New Zealand artist and art teacher

Ivy Margaret Copeland (15 June 1888 – 28 August 1961) was a New Zealand artist and arts teacher.

== Early life and education ==
Born in Auckland on 15 June 1888, Copeland began studying with C. F. Goldie when she was 10 years old, and later studied with the English artist Dennis Seaward in Whanganui. She went on to study at the Elam School of Fine Arts, in Auckland.

== Teaching career ==
Copeland lectured at Auckland Teachers' Training College, and in 1930 was granted leave for an overseas trip to study art and art education in Europe. Ida Carey was appointed to lecture during her absence. In 1933 she moved to the South Island and taught art, first at Canterbury College, and then from 1935 at Dunedin Training College. After retiring from teaching in 1940, she returned to Auckland and painted full time. In 1932 and in 1943 she held one-woman shows at the Auckland Society of Arts (ASA), featuring many paintings inspired by her travels abroad. In November 1951 she exhibited 96 works at the ASA.

== Artistic career ==
Copeland painted traditional subject matter, taking a particular interest in still life, particularly the study of flowers. Copeland also painted landscapes and in 1946 was awarded the Bledisloe Medal for her oil painting Back of Beyond. Copeland is best remembered for her portrait paintings, she had a particular interest in Māori subjects.

In 1940 her landscape painting Winter sunshine, Heathcote, Christchurch was included in the National Centennial Exhibition of New Zealand Art. Two of her works were included in the ASA exhibition New Zealand Women Painters 1845–1968. Most recently she was featured in the 1993 exhibition White Camelias.

Copeland died in Auckland on 28 August 1961. In her will she left her paintings to the ASA to raise funds to establish the Ivy Copeland award for portraiture, awarded to a tertiary student biannually.
