= Chris Charteris =

New Zealand artist (born 1966)

- Born: 1966 (age 59–60); Auckland, New Zealand
- Known for: Jewellery, carving, sculpture

Chris Charteris (born 1966) is a New Zealand sculptor, jeweller and carver.

== Early life and education ==
Charteris was born in Auckland, adopted into a Pākehā family as a young child, and told he was Māori, before discovering much later that he was of Kiribati, Fijian and English descent. He began his artistic training in Kaitaia in Māori carving and design.

Between 1986 and 1996, he worked as a carving tutor at Otago and Southland Polytechnics, and the Dunedin College of Education's Arai Te Uru Kokiri Youth Learning Centre. In 1995, he established Te Whare Whakairo Gallery and Workshop in Dunedin.

== Career ==
He has exhibited at FhE Galleries in Auckland with Tuanako in 2011, To the Heart of the Matter in 2010, and Matau 2008. His work has been included in the group exhibition Wunderrūma: New Zealand Jewellery, exhibited at The Dowse Art Museum in Lower Hutt and at Galerie Handwerk in Munich. His work was also part of Pasifika Styles at the Museum of Archaeology and Anthropology, University of Cambridge. His work was included in the third and fourth New Zealand Jewellery Biennials, Turangawaewae: A Public Outing, held at The Dowse Art Museum in 1998, and Grammar: Subjects and Objects, held in 2001.

=== 1 Noble Savage, 2 Dusky Maidens ===
In 1999 Charteris collaborated with jewellers Niki Hastings-McFall and Sofia Tekala-Smith on the exhibition 1 Noble Savage, 2 Dusky Maidens at Judith Anderson Gallery in Auckland, which helped draw attention to a new generation of New Zealand artists of Pacific descent and showed “what contemporary jewellers might offer to contemporary Pacific identity − notably a sense of playful appropriation of Pacific adornment that is ironic and serious at the same time.”

The exhibition was accompanied by a publication titled 1 Noble Savage, 2 Dusky Maidens with reproductions of the three artists' work and essays by Mark Kirby, Lisa Taouma and Nicholas Thomas. The publication's catalogue featured a photograph of the three artists in a faux-ethnographic style, dressed in traditional manner and mimicking the conventions of photographs taken in Samoa in the 1890s for Western consumption, as a comment on stereotypical presentations of Pacific peoples.

=== Now and Then ===
In 2010 Charteris again held a joint exhibition with Hastings-McFall titled Now and Then at the RH Gallery at Woollaston in Nelson. The overarching principle of the 2010 exhibition was 'Va', or the Samoan concept of 'the space between'. In his work for the exhibition Charteris explored new materials, using car paint, magnets and mother of pearl in one work, and nikau bark in another.

=== Tungaru: the Kiribati project ===
In 2014 Charteris collaborated with designer and director Jeff Smith on Tungaru: the Kiribati project. The two artists travelled to Kiribati and on their return made a number of works that were displayed at the Auckland War Memorial Museum and the Mangere Arts Centre. At the Museum items from the Pacific collection were mixed with new art works by Charteris, a digital interactive by Smith, and archival film footage; items from the Museum's collection were also shown with new works by Smith and Charteris at the Mangere Arts Centre.

The new work at the Mangere Arts Centre included a large-scale installation titled Te ma (Fish-trap). 7.4 metres long and 4.6 metres wide, the work was inspired by the heart-shaped fish traps built off the shores of Kiribati; Charteris used 8000 pairs of Ringed Venus shells to recreate the walls of the fish trap, which in Kiribati are made of broken coral.

The exhibition was accompanied by a publication, Tungaru: the Kiribati project, with an extended essay by Mark Amery, and photographs of the artists' research visit to Kiribati and their works.

The exhibition toured to Pataka Art + Museum and Hastings City Art Gallery in 2015.

== Collections ==
His work is held in the Museum of New Zealand Te Papa Tongarewa, The Dowse Art Museum, the Auckland War Memorial Museum, the British Museum and the Museum of Archaeology and Anthropology, University of Cambridge.

== Further information ==
- "Interview with Chris Charteris". Standing Room Only, Radio New Zealand National. 2014.
- The Dowse Art Museum; Richard Bell, The Third New Zealand Jewellery Biennial: Turangawaewae: A Public Outing, 1998.
- Deborah Crowe; The Dowse Art Museum, 4th New Zealand Jewellery Biennale: Grammar: Subjects and Objects, 2001.
