= Rose Henderson (social worker) =

New Zealand social worker

Rose Henderson ONZM
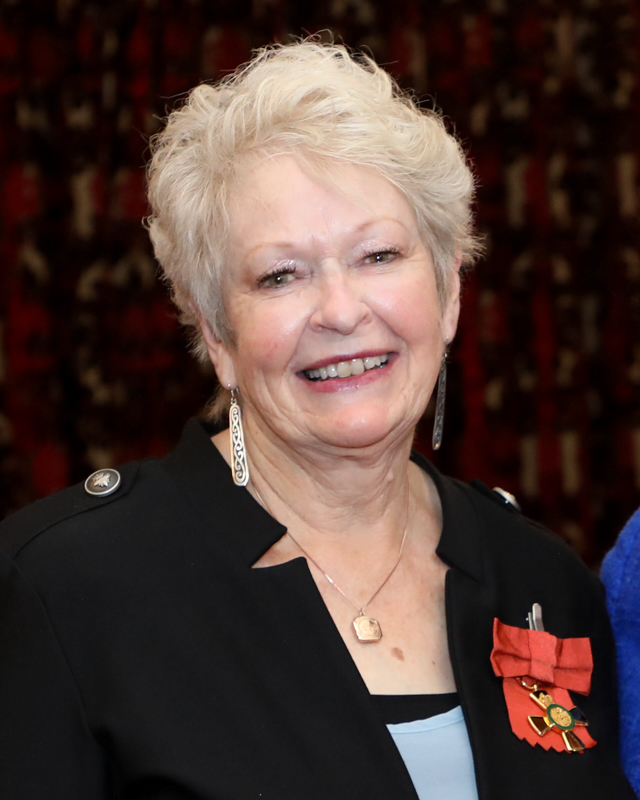
- Awards: Officer of the New Zealand Order of Merit

Academic background
- Education: Dunedin Teachers' Training College, University of Otago

Rosemary Alice Henderson (also known as Rose) ONZM is a New Zealand social worker. In 2024 Henderson was appointed an Officer of the New Zealand Order of Merit for services to social work and health.

== Early life and education ==
Henderson grew up in rural Southland. She attended the Dunedin College of Education, and worked as a primary school teacher for four years. She went on to earn diplomas in Māori and in Social and Community Work in 1998. She also gained a Postgraduate Diploma in Social Welfare in 2004. Some of Henderson's qualifications were earned through distance learning, which enabled her to complete them whilst raising her family.

== Career ==
In the 1970s Henderson worked as a social worker in Invercargill, for the Department of Social Welfare. She was involved in establishing Invercargill's women's refuge, and acted as the coordinator, as well as being elected to the Area Health Board. By 2009 Henderson had moved to Christchurch and was appointed director of Allied Health Specialist Mental Health Services for the Canterbury District Health Board. She was later director of Allied Health.

Henderson served as President of the Aotearoa New Zealand Association of Social Workers (ANZASW) from 2003 until 2010 and served a second term in 2016. While Henderson was president, she worked towards the establishment of the Social Workers Registration Board, which happened in 2003. Since 2019 Henderson has been a board member of the registration board.

In 2018 Henderson was elected as the President of the Asia–Pacific Region of the International Federation of Social Workers. She served as Vice-President of the International Federation of Social Workers, and through that role supported the establishment of the IFSW Indigenous Commission in 2020.

== Honours and awards ==
During her studies, Henderson was awarded the Sir Peter Buck (Te Rangihīroa) Prize in Māori Studies in 1994. In 2010 Henderson was awarded Life Membership of the ANZASW.

In the 2024 New Year Honours Henderson was appointed an Officer of the New Zealand Order of Merit for services to social work and health.

== Personal life ==
Henderson has four children.
