= Gore High School =

Location
- Coutts Road, Gore; 46.1037°S 168.9299°E

Information
- Type: State co-ed Secondary (Year 9-13)
- Motto: Palma Non Sine Pulvere
- Established: 1908
- Ministry of Education Institution no.: 396
- Rector: Melanie Hamilton
- Enrolment: (July 2026)
- Socio-economic decile: 6N
- Website: gore-high.school.nz

Gore High School was a secondary school in Gore, New Zealand. The school operated until 2023. On 1 January 2024 it merged with Longford Intermediate to form a new school, Māruawai College.

== Notable staff ==
- Johnny Borland – high jumper, athletics official
- George Jobberns – geographer, university professor
- James Ernest Strachan – school principal

== Notable alumni ==
- Aaron Barclay (born 1992), triathlete
- Todd Barclay (born 1990), Member of Parliament for Clutha-Southland
- Jimmy Cowan (born 1982), former Highlanders and All Blacks half back
- Amanda Hooper (née Christie, 1980–2011), professional field hockey player
- Justin Marshall (born 1973), former Crusaders and All Black Half back
- Marty McKenzie (born 1992), current Chiefs, Taranaki and New Zealand Maori All Blacks First-Five
- Penny Simmonds, Member of Parliament for Invercargill
