= James Fitzgerald (New Zealand cricketer) =

New Zealand cricketer and physician

Personal information
- Born: 20 March 1862; Pigeon Bay, Canterbury, New Zealand
- Died: 24 June 1943 (aged 81); Dunedin, Otago, New Zealand
- Relatives: William Fitzgerald (father)

Domestic team information
- Years: Team
- 1883/84–1884/85: Otago
- Source: CricInfo, 9 May 2016

James Fitzgerald (20 March 1862 – 24 June 1943) was a New Zealand cricketer and physician.

He was one of the twins born at Pigeon Bay on Banks Peninsula in 1862; his father was the educationalist William Fitzgerald. He earned his medical degree at the Dunedin School of Medicine. He played two first-class matches for Otago, one in each of the 1883–84 and 1884–85 seasons. Fitzgerald was a physician and was the oldest one practising in New Zealand at the time of his death. He was a member of the Otago University Council. He died on 24 June 1943 in Dunedin.
