= Rangiora High School =

Secondary school in Rangiora, New Zealand

- Rangiora High School crest

Location
- East Belt; Rangiora 7400; New Zealand; 43.29725°S 172.59876°E

Information
- Type: State
- Motto: Latin: Lux cum Amore (Enlightenment with Friendship)
- Established: 28 January 1884
- Ministry of Education Institution no.: 312
- Chairman: Simon Green
- Principal: Bruce Kearney
- Teaching staff: 117
- Employees: 167+
- Years offered: 9–13
- Gender: Co-educational
- Age: 12 to 18
- Hours in school day: 9:00 am–2:55 pm
- Houses: Six: Hillary; Lydiard; Mansfield; Ngata; Rutherford; Sheppard
- Colours: Dark teal and gold
- Slogan: Proud of our past, focused on our future.
- Socio-economic decile: 9Q
- Alumni: Notable alumni of Rangiora High School
- Website: www.rangiorahigh.school.nz

Rangiora High School is a state co-educational secondary school located in Rangiora, New Zealand. Established in 1881 by an act of parliament and opened in 1884, the school has a roll of 1,680 students from years 9 to 13 (approx. ages 12 to 18) as of July 2026, making it the fifth-biggest school in the South Island.

== Enrolment ==
Rangiora High School operates an enrolment scheme to help curb roll numbers and prevent overcrowding. The school's home zone, in which students residing are automatically entitled to be enrolled, covers much of the central Waimakariri District and the southern Hurunui District. Students residing outside the zone are sometimes accepted, as roll places allow in accordance with the enrolment scheme order of preference.

As of July 2026, Rangiora High School has roll of 1,680 students, of which 263 (15.7%) identify as Māori.

As of 2026, the school has an Equity Index of 454, placing it amongst schools whose students have average socioeconomic barriers to achievement (roughly equivalent to deciles 5 and 6 under the former socio-economic decile system).

== Curriculum ==
Rangiora High School has developed a junior curriculum based on the New Zealand Curriculum. In Years 9 and 10 students study English, Mathematics, Science, Social Studies, and Health & Physical Education. They also select elective subjects, which can include Arts subjects, Technology subjects and Language subjects (out of French, Japanese, and Te Reo Māori).

In Years 11 to 13, students complete the National Certificate of Educational Achievement (NCEA), the main secondary school qualification in New Zealand. Levels 1, 2 and 3 of NCEA are usually completed in Years 11, 12 and 13 respectively, although students can choose subjects from different levels depending on their progress through the NCEA level system. In Year 11, students study English, Mathematics and four full-year elective subjects. Students in Year 12 study six full-year elective subjects. Students in Year 13 study five full-year elective subjects, with study for an additional four periods per week.

Rangiora High School has a school farm, which is used to teach land-based studies. Set up in 1910, it started out running stock and growing crops, before being officially opened in November 1930 by Lord Bledisloe, the then Governor-General.

== Co-curricular ==
=== School houses ===
Rangiora High School is divided into six houses, each containing approximately 300 students and 25 staff. Houses also provide a basis for inter-house competition in sport and cultural activities. The houses are named for New Zealanders who have achieved distinction in their respective areas. They are:

- Hillary (red), named after mountaineer Sir Edmund Hillary
- Lydiard (orange), named after athlete Arthur Lydiard
- Mansfield (yellow), named after author Katherine Mansfield
- Ngata (green), named after politician and lawyer Sir Āpirana Ngata
- Rutherford (blue), named after scientist Lord Ernest Rutherford
- Sheppard (white), named after suffragist Kate Sheppard

== Staff ==
Rangiora High School has over 100 teaching staff and more than 50 support staff as of 27 August 2021.

== Principals ==
Since its opening in 1884, Rangiora High School has been led by the following principals:

- 1884–1886: Rev. Henry E. Tuckey
- 1886–1893: Mr Thomas W. Rowe
- 1893–1898: Rev. G. I. Sim
- 1899–1917: Mr Thomas R. Cresswell
- 1917–1948: Mr James E. Strachan
- 1949–1963: Mr Joe Moffat
- 1964–1978: Mr Tom Penny
- 1979–1989: Mr Colin Macintosh
- 1989–2002: Mr Peter Allen
- 2003–2016: Mrs Peggy Burrows
- 2017–2022: Ms Karen Stewart
- 2022–present: Mr Bruce Kearney

== Notable alumni ==
Notable former students of Rangiora High School include:

- Todd Blackadder – rugby union player and coach, All Black (1995–2000, including captain 1997–2000)
- Sir Malcolm McRae Burns CBE KBE – agricultural scientist, principal of Lincoln College (later Lincoln University) and President of the Royal Society of New Zealand
- Ron Chippindale – aviation accident investigator, Chief Inspector of the Office of Air Accident Investigations (1975–90) and the Transport Accident Investigation Commission (1990–98)
- Berkeley Dallard – Under-Secretary of the Department of Justice, Controller-General of Prisons
- Margaret Dalziel
- Brian Ford – rugby union player, All Black (1977–79)
- Mary Goulding – basketballer
- Hon Rodney Hide QSO – politician, former ACT Party leader, Cabinet Minister, MP for Epsom 1996-2011
- Graeme Higginson – rugby union player, All Black (1980–83)
- The Most Reverend Bishop Edward Joyce – Bishop of the Roman Catholic Diocese of Christchurch (1950-1964)
- Tutehounuku "Nuk" Korako – politician
- Ian MacRae – rugby union player
- Brigadier Reginald Miles CBE MC – military leader, prisoner of war
- Fletcher Newell – rugby union player, All Black
- Guy Newton – flying ace of the Royal New Zealand Air Force
- Angie Petty (née Smit) – athlete
- Tim Price – New Zealand representative eventer
- Gabi Rennie – footballer
- Ian Sinclair – test cricketer (1956)
- Nick Smith MP – politician, cabinet minister, MP for Tasman/Nelson (1990–2020)
- Barry Thompson – rugby union player, politician
- Whetu Tirikatene-Sullivan ONZ (née Tirikatene) – politician, cabinet minister, MP for Southern Maori 1967-96
- Henare Uru – MP for Southern Maori (1922–28)
- Dr J. Morgan Williams – Parliamentary Commissioner for the Environment (1997-2007)
- Donna Wilkins (née Loffhagen) – Silver Fern player and Tall Fern captain

== History ==
A School Council was established in 1921 to give pupils a role in school affairs, and a Nursery School in 1938 to provide pupils with practical experience at child care. The school farm was developed in the 1920s during the tenure of Mr. J. E. Strachan as principal, enabling the school to offer a full range of agricultural courses. The farm was originally 130 acres but this has since changed.

A giant redwood tree is in the grounds of the school. It was planted in 1887 to mark Queen Victoria's Diamond Jubilee and has now grown into a very large tree.
