= Frank Livingstone Combs =

New Zealand teacher, educationalist, and editor

Frank Livingstone Combs (19 July 1882 – 31 August 1960) was a New Zealand teacher, educationalist and editor. He was born in Napier, Hawke's Bay, New Zealand on 19 July 1882. He was twice elected President of the New Zealand Educational Institute, in 1927 and 1936.
