= Johnny Borland =

New Zealand high jumper (1925–1990)

Personal information
- Full name: John Haines Borland
- Born: 9 March 1925 Rangiora, New Zealand
- Died: 21 February 1990 (aged 64) Dunedin, New Zealand
- Occupation: Schoolteacher
- Spouse: Eva Cynthia Peirson (m. 1953; died 1982)
- Children: 3

Sport
- Country: New Zealand
- Sport: Track and field

Achievements and titles
- National finals: High jump champion (1946, 1947, 1950)

John Haines Borland (9 March 1925 – 21 February 1990) was a New Zealand school teacher, field athlete and athletics official. He represented his country in the high jump at the 1950 British Empire Games, and served as president of the New Zealand Amateur Athletic Association from 1970 to 1971.

== Early life and family ==
Born in Rangiora on 9 March 1925, Borland was the son of Robert William Borland, who was appointed a Member of the Order of the British Empire (Military Division) in the 1946 New Year Honours. Johnny Borland was educated at Christchurch Boys' High School, and went on to study at Canterbury University College and the University of Otago, where he was awarded a Diploma of Physical Education.

Borland married Eva Cynthia Peirson, a physiotherapist, in 1953, and the couple went on to have three children.

== Athletics ==
=== High jump ===
Borland won three national high jump titles: in 1946, 1947 and 1950. His best winning jump was in 1950, with a height of 6 ft 3 in (1.91 m). He was also the New Zealand universities high jump champion every year from 1945 to 1952 except 1947, and was awarded blues in those years. In 1949, Borland won the Australasian universities high jump championship.

At the 1950 British Empire Games in Auckland, Borland represented New Zealand in the high jump. He finished in fourth place with a best leap of 6 ft 5 in (1.96 m), a New Zealand record, the same height as the silver and bronze medallists and 1 in (2.5 cm) below the winning height.

=== Administration and coaching ===
Borland was involved in athletics administration. He was a New Zealand selector between 1957 and 1961; manager of the New Zealand athletics team that travelled to Australia in 1960; and served a one-year term as president of the New Zealand Amateur Athletic Association in 1970–71.

== Later life and death ==
Borland worked as a physical education teacher at Gore High School, and later lived in retirement in Dunedin. He died at his home there on 21 February 1990, and his ashes were buried at Andersons Bay Cemetery. He had been predeceased by his wife, Cynthia, in 1982.
