= Cliff Whiting =

New Zealand artist

Cliff Whiting ONZ
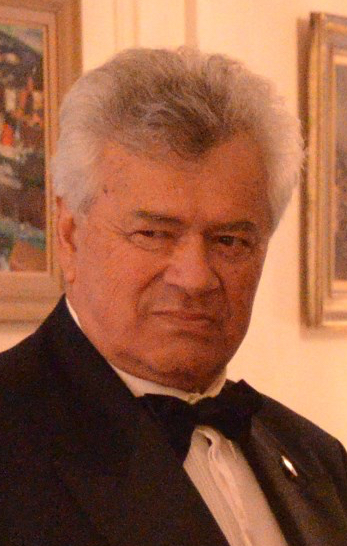
- Whiting in 2013
- Born: Clifford Hamilton Whiting; 6 May 1936; Te Kaha, New Zealand
- Died: 16 July 2017 (aged 81); Whangārei, New Zealand
- Education: Wellington Teachers' College
- Known for: Painting, carving
- Notable work: Te Marae (Te Papa)

Clifford Hamilton Whiting ONZ (6 May 1936 – 16 July 2017) was a New Zealand artist, teacher and advocate for Māori heritage.

== Career ==
In 1955, Whiting began teacher training at Wellington Teachers' College where his artistic talents were quickly recognised. He also enrolled at the Dunedin Training College. His teacher training coincided with the Department of Education's drive to develop Māori and Western European culture in schools. Whiting was selected as a district advisor in arts and crafts and, with other young Māori artists including John Bevan Ford, Sandy Adsett, Cath Brown, Ralph Hotere, Paratene Matchitt, Muru Walters and Marilyn Webb, was supported and encouraged by Gordon Tovey, the national supervisor for arts and crafts, to explore and promote traditional and contemporary Māori art within the New Zealand educational system.

As a district advisor Whiting worked with local Māori communities as well as schools to encourage engagement with Māori art. Constrained by the price and lack of availability of traditional timbers and tools he explored and encouraged the use of modern materials, especially particle and hard boards, and bold colours. These new materials and techniques combined with traditional subjects contributed to the development of his innovative artistic style.

During the 1970s Whiting accepted the position of lecturer in Māori art at Palmerston North Teachers' College where he introduced the concept of student marae visits and continued to encourage the inclusion of Māori art in schools. In 1979 he directed and led the carving, kōwhaiwhai, painting and kākaho panels of the college's wharenui (carved meeting houses) Te Kupenga o Te Mātauranga.

Whiting's work with Māori communities and his belief in the importance on the role of the marae in maintaining and revitalising Māori arts and culture led him to contribute to and lead in restoring historic wharenui and other marae buildings. He was encouraged in this by Pineamine Taiapa, a renowned, traditionally trained carver and a relation of Whiting's on his mother's side of the family. Whiting joined the New Zealand Historic Places Trust and in 1974 served on the trust's Māori Heritage Advisory Committee. He also worked with the Historic Places Trust as the Māori buildings adviser and become a leading authority on the restoration of Māori buildings. Whiting participated in the Historic Places Trust's first marae conservation project at Manutuke. It had always been the trust's policy to work in partnership with iwi and hapū when restoring marae. Whiting felt that it was his role to establish and maintain a close connection between the trust and those iwi (tribes) participating in the various projects.

== Art ==
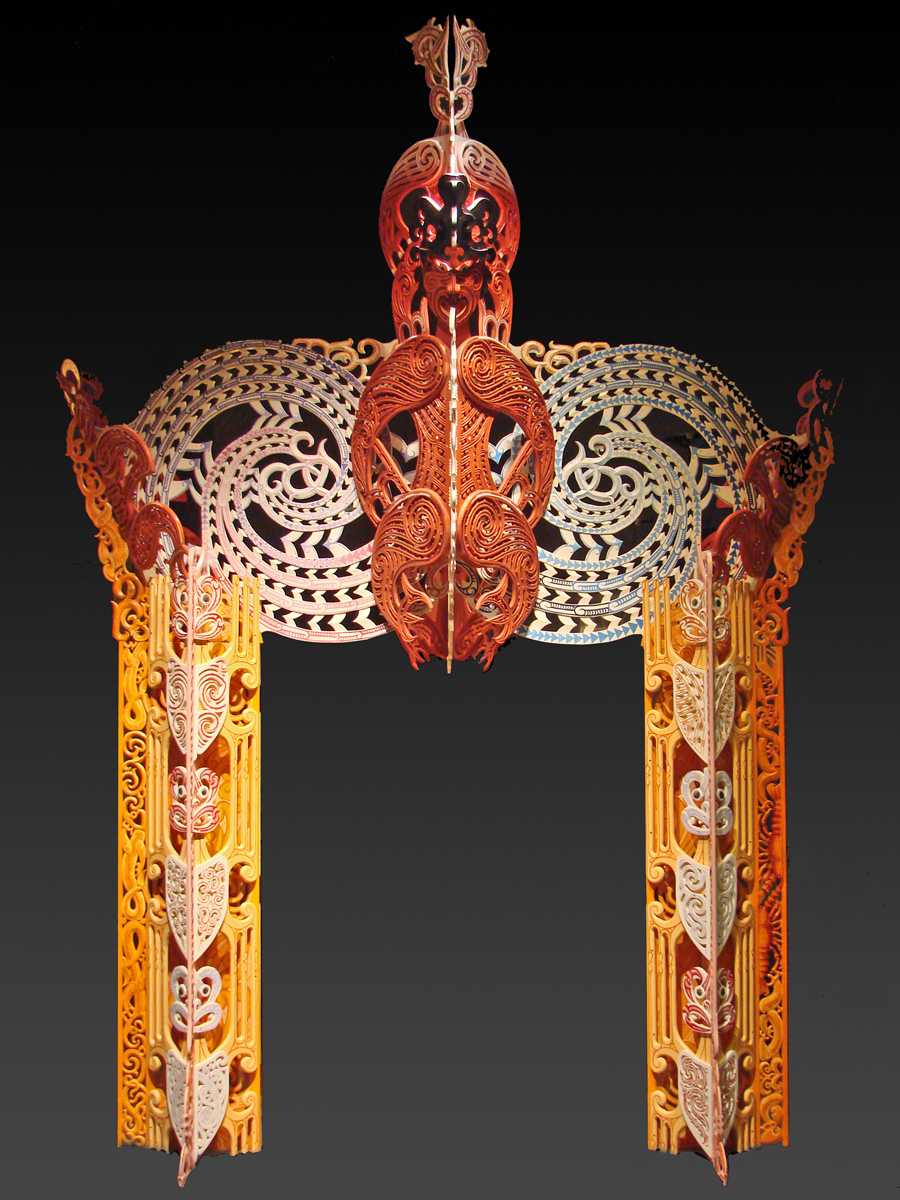
An ornamental gateway named "Te Kūwaha o Wharetutu" carved by Whiting, from the collection of the Ethnological Museum of Berlin

Whiting also continued to develop his art. He was one of the first Māori artists to illustrate for school publications such as Te Wharekura and Tautoko. He also regularly accepted commissions for large-scale murals including:

- Tāwhirimātea and children, 1978 for the New Zealand Metservice
- Te wehenga o Rangi rāua ko Papa for the reading room of the National Library of New Zealand
- Ngā Kete Wānanga, 1989 for the Christchurch High Court
- Aoraki and his brother mountains for the New Zealand Department of Conservation Aoraki / Mount Cook Area Office Visitor Centre.

He also completed murals for:

- Otago Museum
- Television New Zealand
- Archives New Zealand
- The Waitangi Tribunal.

His work is featured in the collections of:

- The Ethnological Museum of Berlin
- Dowse Art Museum
- The Fletcher Trust

== Exhibition curator ==
Whiting played a significant role in a number of important exhibitions in the 1990s, each accompanied by a publication. He was able to show how Māoritanga could drive the re-evaluation of contemporary art and craft in Aotearoa New Zealand. In 1990 he was one of three selector/curators (the other two were Justine Olsen and John Parker) for the New Zealand Craft Council’s exhibition Mau Mahara: our Stories in Craft. Whiting introduced into the exhibition unique functional and historical objects, such as the harpoon that caught the last whale off Te Kaha, and ensured that the exhibition took a wider cultural perspective. He was also a key member of the curatorium for Headlands: Thinking Through New Zealand Art that opened at the MCA in Sydney in 1992. In the same year Whiting helped curate Te Waka Toi: Contemporary Māori Art from New Zealand which toured five US venues. This was the first exhibition of Māori art in the United States since Te Māori had been presented at the Metropolitan Museum of Art in New York in 1984.

== Arts administration ==
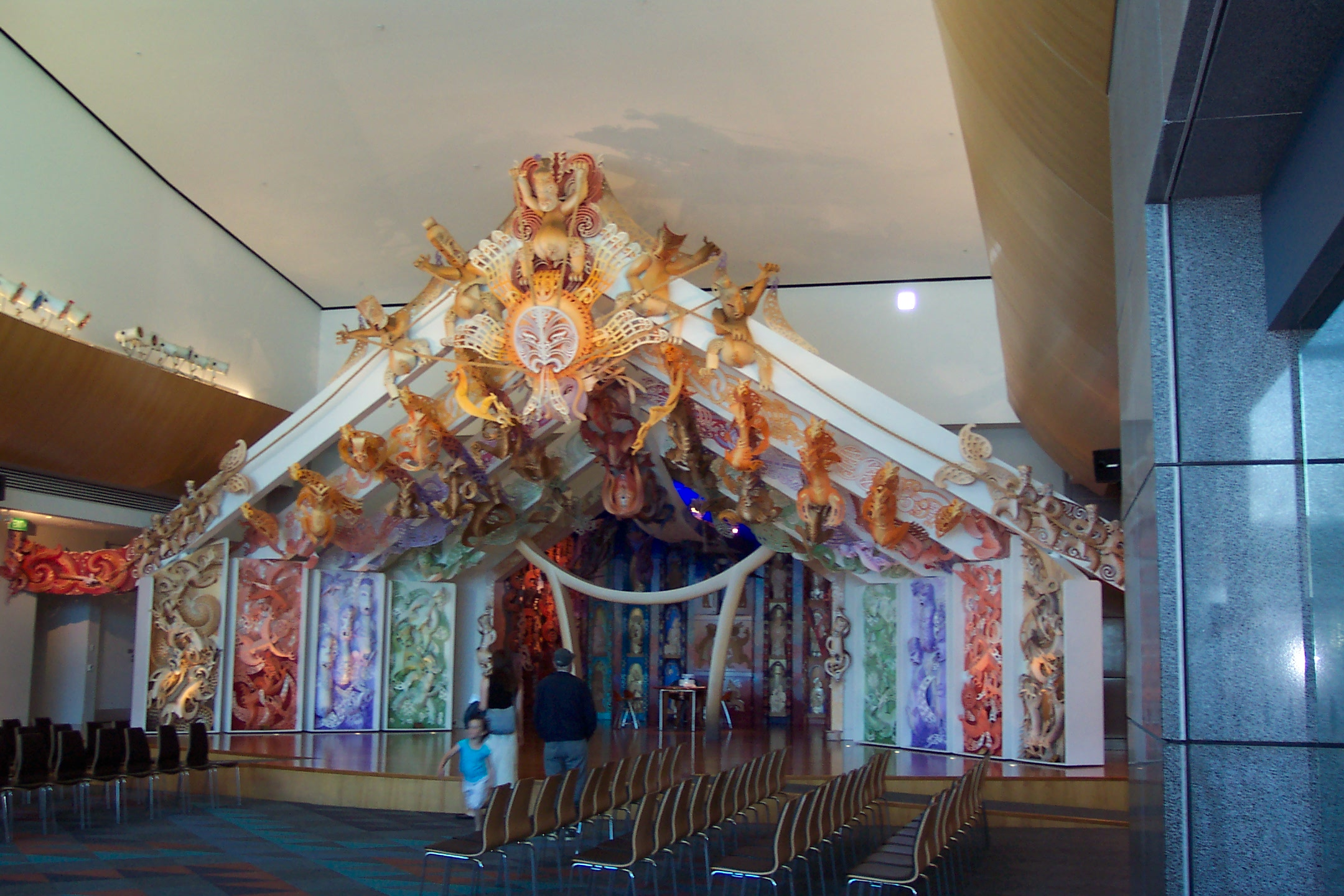
Meeting house Te Hono ki Hawaiki at Rongomaraeroa, the contemporary marae inside Te Papa Tongarewa

Whiting became involved in arts administration and in 1979 was appointed to the Council for Māori and Pacific Arts (now known as Te Waka Toi). He became the chairman in 1988. He was also a member and deputy chair of the Queen Elizabeth II Arts Council (now known as Creative New Zealand). In 1993 he joined the staff of the Museum of New Zealand Te Papa Tongarewa becoming Director of Māori and Bicultural Development. In 1995 he was appointed Kaihautū, or joint chief executive, of the museum working in partnership with Cheryll Sotheran. He led the exploration of the museum's bicultural processes based on the principles of the Treaty of Waitangi working with museum staff to develop the Māori exhibitions and care for and display the taonga (treasures) from around New Zealand held by the museum. In particular he led the design and construction of the contemporary marae Rongomaraeroa and the wharenui Te Hono ki Hawaiki. The marae complex is situated on the fourth floor of the museum and was completed for the new building's opening with a dawn ceremony and pōwhiri on 14 February 1998. This marae is where all of the museum's formal welcome ceremonies are held and is open for the general public to view during the museum's opening hours.

After leaving the Museum of New Zealand Te Papa Tongarewa he was appointed kaumātua to Tourism New Zealand in December 2000. His role was to provide advice and ensure that Maāori culture was correctly portrayed when Tourism New Zealand marketed New Zealand as an international visitor destination. The successful 100% Pure New Zealand global marketing campaign featured Māori culture as a point of difference from other international destinations and Tourism New Zealand wanted to ensure that any portrayal of Māori culture was sensitive and culturally acceptable, but also innovative and contemporary.

== Contemporary wharenui and marae ==
Following the construction of the wharenui at the Palmerston North Teachers' College and the marae at the Museum of New Zealand Te Papa Tongarewa, Whiting continued to work on contemporary wharenui. He worked on the wharenui Maru Kaitatea at Takahanga Marae in Kaikōura, which was opened in 2001. He also worked on the development of Te Rau Aroha Marae for the Awarua Rūnanga in Bluff. This marae complex was named in remembrance of the bus that travelled throughout New Zealand during World War I, receiving donations for soldiers. Again the wharenui was the centre of the marae. Named Tahu Pōtiki, this wharenui also featured the bold colours and rich carvings expected from Whiting's work.

== Honours and awards ==
Whiting's contribution to teaching, art and the cultural heritage of New Zealand was acknowledged. In 1990, he was awarded the New Zealand 1990 Commemoration Medal. He was conferred an honorary Doctor of Literature degree by Massey University in 1996. In the 1999 New Year Honours, he was appointed a Member of the Order of New Zealand, New Zealand's highest civil honour. He also received the Alan Highet Award for excellence in the arts in 1986 and was granted honorary life membership of the New Zealand Historic Places Trust in 2004. In 2017 he was posthumously awarded Te Tohu o Te Papa Tongarewa Rongomaraeroa | Outstanding contribution to Ngā toi Māori (Māori art) by Te Papa Tongarewa at the Te Waka Toi awards.

== Personal life ==
Whiting was born and raised in Te Kaha, New Zealand, and affiliated to the Te Whānau-ā-Apanui tribe. Whiting died on 16 July 2017.
