= James Strachan (educator) =

New Zealand school principal (1883–1973)

James Strachan OBE
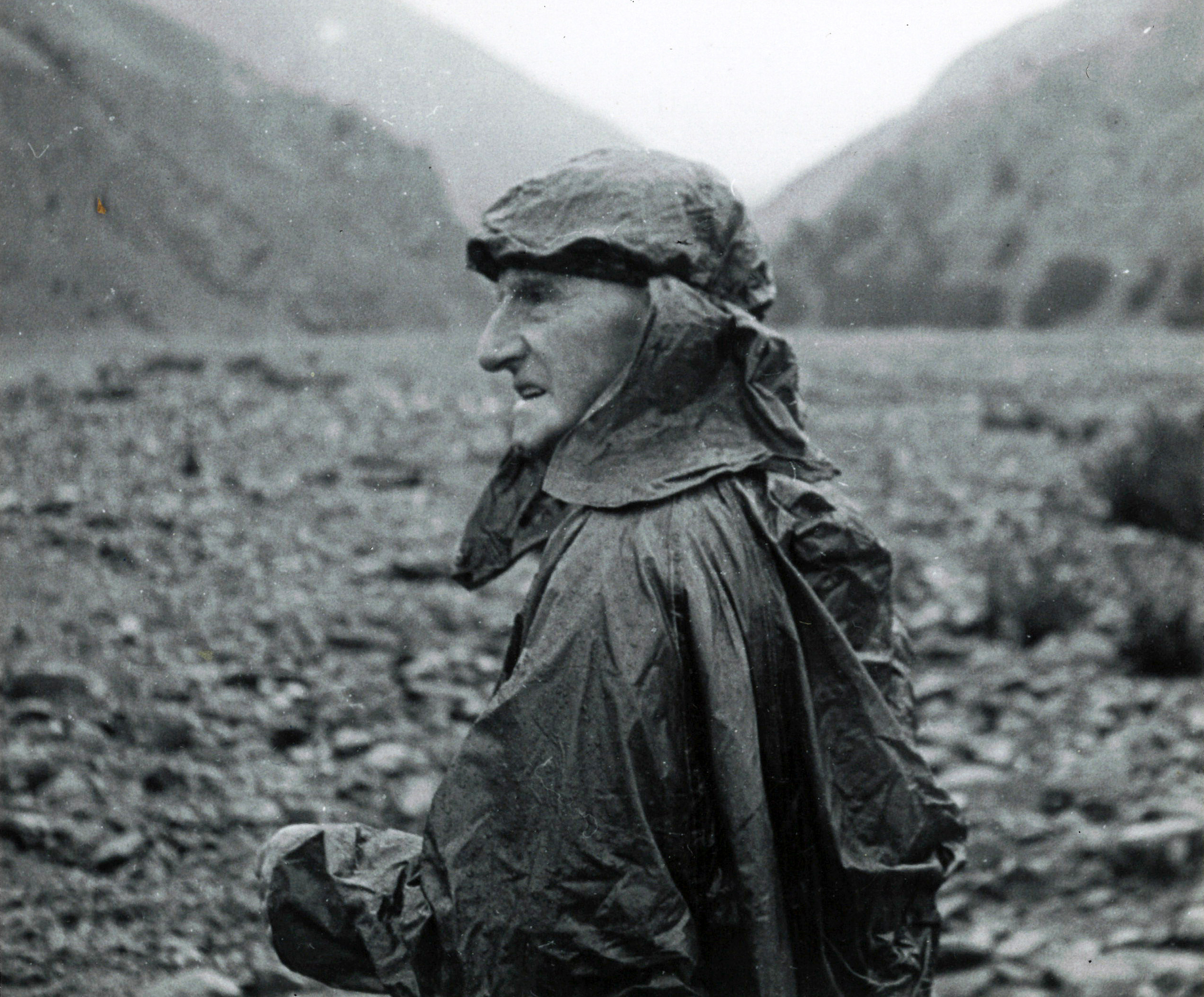
- Strachan in 1949

Principal of Rangiora High School
- In office 1917–1948
- Preceded by: Thomas R. Cresswell
- Succeeded by: J. F. Moffatt

Personal details
- Born: James Ernest Strachan; 20 April 1883 Dunedin, New Zealand
- Died: 30 September 1973 (aged 90) Christchurch, New Zealand
- Spouses: Mary Irene Chalmers (m. 1914; died 1923) Vera Agnes Barrell (m. 1934)
- Children: 2 sons; 1 daughter
- Parents: James Cochrane Strachan; Helen Moir
- Education: University of Otago

James Ernest Strachan OBE (20 April 1883 – 30 September 1973) was a New Zealand educator. He was born in Dunedin, New Zealand, in 1883. He was the principal of Rangiora High School from 1917–1948, during which time he abolished corporal punishment and the prefect system and introduced the school council, among others.

== Education ==
In 1903, he entered the Dunedin Teachers' College. He also took classes at the University of Otago, graduating MA with honours in mental science in 1905.

== Career ==
From 1906 to 1910, he was assistant master in the secondary department of Lawrence District High School, and from 1911 to 1917, he was science master at Gore High School.

In 1917, Strachan was appointed principal of Rangiora High School, from where he was able to complete a BSc at Canterbury College (now called the University of Canterbury) in 1921. During his time as principal, he gave more emphasis to existing courses in agriculture, home science and commerce to supplement the traditional professional courses. In 1926 he introduced his 'organic curriculum', which included a central core of science, technology, fine arts and sociology. It was, in part, intended to inculcate social skills such as critical thinking and citizenship. He abolished the prefect system and introduced a school council, which included student representatives. Corporal punishment was replaced by an emphasis on self-discipline. In 1930, he abolished the prize system.

Strachan's innovations inevitably encountered opposition. Working-class parents objected to students being encouraged to remain in school, as they wanted their children to become wage-earners as soon as possible. For other parents, good examination passes in subjects such as Latin were seen as passports to tertiary education and to white-collar occupations. Some chose to send their children to school in Christchurch. Hostility also came from officials within the Department of Education. Strachan, however, gained the support of Prime Minister William Massey, who visited the school in 1920, and of ministers of education such as C. J. Parr and Harry Atmore. His reforms were endorsed by a royal commission in 1925; a consultative committee in 1943 recommended that Strachan's system should form the basis of the post-primary curriculum. In the 1947 New Year Honours Strachan was appointed an Officer of the Order of the British Empire.

He retired in 1948, although he relieved at Greymouth Technical School, Waimate High School and Christ's College. His publications included The school looks at life (1938), an account of the Rangiora experiment. His experiments at Rangiora High School were discontinued by his successor, J. F. Moffatt, but were later widely adopted in the New Zealand school system.

== Radio ==
Strachan was a notable amateur radio expert. He was credited with having sent New Zealand's first radio signal (the length of a back garden in Dunedin). His interest in the potential of wireless telegraphy to create international goodwill through better communication had led him to develop a school radio station, ZL3AI, where pupils could enhance their knowledge of the new technology while sharing ideas with their counterparts overseas. A lifelong interest in international affairs resulted in his leading the New Zealand delegation to the conference of the Institute of Pacific Relations in 1931. He gained a Carnegie Foundation travel grant to the United States and Europe in 1938. He was also chairman of the reception committee that met Charles Kingsford Smith after his trans-Tasman flight in 1928.

== Personal life ==
While at Lawrence, he married Mary Irene Chalmers on 2 September 1914. They had one daughter. Mary Strachan died in 1923, and James married Vera Agnes Barrell at Waikuku Beach on 3 January 1934. He enjoyed painting and photography.

== Death ==
Strachan died at Christchurch on 30 September 1973, survived by his second wife, daughter and two sons. An autobiographical memoir was left uncompleted at his death.
