= Sandy Adsett =

New Zealand artist, curator, educator (born 1939)

Sandy Adsett MNZM
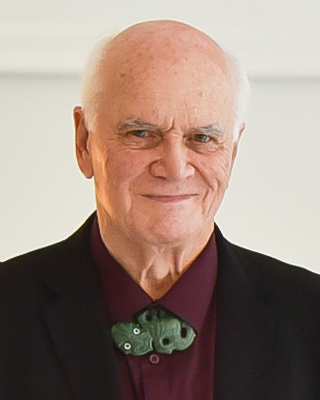
- Adsett in 2020
- Born: Raymond Henry Adsett; 27 August 1939 (age 86); Raupunga, New Zealand
- Education: Ardmore Teachers' College; Dunedin Teachers' College
- Known for: Kōwhaiwhai painting
- Awards: Arts Foundation of New Zealand Icon (2020)

Raymond Henry "Sandy" Adsett MNZM (born 27 August 1939) is a New Zealand visual artist and educator. He is acknowledged for championing the art of kōwhaiwhai painting, creating a context for the artform within the development of contemporary Māori art.

In 2020 Adsett was honoured by the Arts Foundation of New Zealand with an Icon Whakamana Hiranga award "for his profound impact on the Māori community and Māori arts education system within Aotearoa."

== Biography ==
Adsett was born in Raupunga near Wairoa on 27 August 1939. Of Māori descent, he affiliates to Ngāti Kahungunu and Ngāti Pāhauwera. He attended Te Aute College in Hawkes Bay. His interest in art first began on his family farm as a way to fill in time and grew from there.

He received his first formal art training at Ardmore Teachers' College in Auckland. He completed his third year of teachers' college in Dunedin. While at Ardmore, he began travelling to regional schools to introduce Māori arts into the school syllabus. This was a focus of his work that would continue throughout his life. He was one of a group of teachers that started this work in the 1960s.

In 1961, Adsett became an arts specialist for the Department of Education's Advisory Service, within a programme established by educational leader Gordon Tovey. Adsett has cited the mentorship of the Ngāti Porou master carver Pine Taiapa as the most significant influence on his life as an artist and educator. Adsett's role in the department was helping introduce the new Māori Arts in Schools programme.

In 1991, Adsett became a principal tutor at Tairawhiti Polytechnic in Gisborne, working in the Toihoukura School of Māori Visual Arts. He took over from Ivan Ehau, the founder of the school, who had died that year. Adsett was involved in formatting a wānanga arts direction for the programme.

In 2002, Adsett returned to Hawke's Bay, where he set up the Toimairangi School of Māori Visual Culture within Te Wānanga o Aotearoa in Hastings. He continues to work there as an adjunct professor.

In 2021 a major retrospective of Adsett's work was organised by Pātaka Art + Museum, curated by Reuben Friend. The accompanying book contains essays by Friend, artists Elizabeth Ellis, Tina Kuckkahn and Robert Jahnke and curators / historians Nigel Borell and David Butts.

Outside of his work in the education sector, Adsett's own artwork has been included in major art exhibitions. This includes: Headlands: Thinking Through New Zealand Art (1992) in Sydney, Australia; "Te Waka Toi" (1992-1994), which toured the United States; and "Toi tū Toi Ora" at Auckland Art Gallery.

In 2024 Adsett's 1978 painting Waipuna was included in the exhibition Stranieri Ovunque, Foreigners Everywhere curated by Adriano Pedrosa for the 60th international exhibition at the Venice Biennale. Other New Zealanders selected for the exhibition were: Brett Graham and Fred Graham, the Mataaho Collective and Selwyn Te Ngareatua Wilson.

== Selected exhibitions ==
- 1986 – Te Ao Marama: Seven Māori Artists, Sydney Opera House. The exhibition was organised by the Sarjeant Gallery in Whanganui and toured to regional galleries in Australia. The six other artists were Rangi Hete, Erenora Puketapu-Hetet, Darcy Nicholas, Fred Graham and Cliff Whiting. Charles Perkins. Arnhem Land Elder Wandjuk Marika formally greeted the 57 Māori elders who attended the opening.
- 1992 – Headlands: Thinking Through New Zealand Art, Museum of Contemporary Art (MCA), Sydney, Australia, and the National Art Gallery, Wellington. Curated by Robert Leonard, Bernice Murphy, John McCormack, Cheryll Sotheran and Cliff Whiting.
- 1992 – Te Waka Toi: Contemporary Māori Art from New Zealand. The exhibition toured to the Heard Museum in Phoenix, San Diego Museum of Man, the Field Museum in Chicago, Washington State Museum in Seattle and the University of Hawaiʻi at Manoa Art Gallery before returning to show in Wellington and Auckland. It was toured the United States by Te Waka Toi: Council for Māori and Pacific Arts.
- 2003 – Kiwa-Pacific Connections (group), Vancouver, Canada.
- 2007 – Te Huringa / Turning Points Pākehā Colonisation and Māori Empowerment (group), Sarjeant Gallery, Whanganui, and the Fletcher Trust. The exhibition was curated by Peter Shaw.
- 2011 – Wrestling with spirits in Vancouver: a Tribute Exhibition by Māori artists (group), Hastings City Art Gallery and Spirit Wrestler Gallery in Vancouver. Adsett curated the exhibition.
- 2013 – Te Ātinga: 25 Years of Contemporary Māori Art (group), Mangere Art Centre Ngā Tohu o Uenuku, Auckland. Curated by Nigel Borell.
- 2020 – Toi Tū Toi Ora: Contemporary Māori Art (group). Auckland Art Gallery.
- 2021 – Sandy Adsett: Toi Koru, Pātaka Art + Gallery, Porirua.

== Honours and awards ==
In 1985, Adsett won the Montana Lindauer Award with his painting Aue. In the 2005 New Year Honours, Adsett was appointed a Member of the New Zealand Order of Merit, for services to art. In 2014, Adsett was conferred an honorary doctorate by Massey University, and he received Te Tohu o Te Papa Tongarewa Rongomaraeroa award in the 2018 Te Waka Toi Awards.

In 2020, Adsett was named as an Arts Foundation of New Zealand Icon, an honour limited to 20 living New Zealanders.

== Collections ==
Adsett's work is held in public gallery collections throughout Aotearoa New Zealand, including:

- Auckland Art Gallery Toi o Tāmaki
- Waikato Museum Te Whare Taonga o Waikato
- Tairawhiti Museum Te Whare Taonga o te Tairawhiti
- Sarjeant Gallery Te Whare o Rehua Whanganui
- Museum of New Zealand Te Papa Tongarewa
