= Yvonne Sloan =

New Zealand weaver (born 1941)

Yvonne Sloan (born 1941) is a New Zealand weaver and textile artist.

== Early life ==
She was born in Remuera, Auckland in 1941 and attended the Dunedin Teachers' Training College in 1961. She began weaving in the 1960s during her time as an Art and Craft Advisor with the Department of Education. In 1966, Sloan travelled to Sweden where she studied weaving at Sätergläntan. Returning to New Zealand, she married weaver Ian Spalding and they established a professional partnership.

== Career ==
In 1983, she became a member of the New Zealand Academy of Fine Arts and in 1986 was invited to exhibit in "Kahurangi" for the World Craft Council Conference in Vienna. Between 1998 and 1990, she served on the QEII Arts Council Crafts Advisory Panel.

Sloan notes that the land and sea had influence on her practice, stating that most of our ancestors came to New Zealand and the South Pacific by sail, regardless of origins and culture.

In 1994, she undertook a residency at Waikato Polytechnic. The following year, she became President of the Auckland Handweavers & Spinners Guild, serving until 1997. From 1996 until 1997, she was also President of the Combined Textile Guilds of NZ. In 1998, she held an exhibition at the Crawford Art Centre in St. Andrews, Scotland, where she created a large-scale work titled Sails, which drew upon concepts of voyaging and the Pacific. In 2000, Sails was installed at the New Zealand Academy of Fine Arts in Queens Wharf, Wellington.

== Style ==
Helen Schamroth described Sloan's style in 100 New Zealand Craft Artists, Sloan's weaving is based on traditional twill, and she has developed a system of inlaying motifs that depends on a lively interaction of warp and weft. Her designs are based on balanced colour bands, intersecting diagonals, verticals and horizontals. The structure produces small spots of colour, which react with each other in a manner that resembles pointillism."

Sloan’s Sails holds personal meaning and reflects New Zealand’s pacific heritage, she explained,

“Most of our ancestors have come to New Zealand by sail. Set in the South Pacific we are surrounded by the sea, regardless of one's origin and culture arriving by sail in NZ is historically important...I came from a long line of seafarers, originally from the Orkney Islands and London. This has influenced my perception of the importance of sail and what it represents....Sails are basic and timeless. My sail installations are an interpretation of the shapes, spaces, angles and movement that sails create.”

== Recognition ==
According to the Christchurch Art Gallery Te Puna o Waiwhetu, “Sloan has contributed significantly to the acceptance of craft weaving as an art form in New Zealand."

In 1994, she was awarded the Committee Cup at the Auckland Handweavers Guild Exhibition, also winning a Merit Award that year at the Combined Textiles Guild Easter Show. In 1996, she won the Premier Award at the Combined Textiles Guild Easter Show. At the 2001 Easter Show she also won a Merit Award.

== Collections ==
Her work is held in the collections of Auckland War Memorial Museum, Christchurch Art Gallery Te Puna o Waiwhetu and the Aigantighe Art Gallery, Timaru.
