= John Hislop (teacher) =

New Zealand teacher, school inspector, educationalist, public servant

John Hislop (7 December 1821 – 19 May 1904) was a New Zealand teacher, school inspector, educationalist and public servant. He was born in Lasswade, Midlothian, Scotland on 7 December 1821. His son, Thomas William Hislop, became Minister of Education.

Hislop established the Normal School in Dunedin in 1876, paving the way for Dunedin Teacher's Training College.
