= Nellie Hutton =

New Zealand painter (1875–1955)

Nellie Laura Douglas Hutton (1875–1955) was a New Zealand painter. Her works are held in the Hocken Collections.

== Biography ==
Hutton was born in Dunedin in 1875, the daughter of artist David Con Hutton and his second wife Helen Bryden (died 1922). David Con Hutton was born in Dundee, Scotland, and arrived in Otago in 1870 and established the Dunedin School of Art, the first such institution in New Zealand. In 1894 this was expanded to the Otago School of Art and Design which Hutton was the principal of until he died in 1910. He was known for his wash drawings and water colours.

Hutton first studied and then taught at the Dunedin School of Art from 1895 to 1920, and continued under King Edward Technical College Board's management from 1920 to 1922. Other members of the Hutton family who taught at the school included David Edward Hutton and Lorne de H. Hutton (died in action in 1918). Hutton's artistic style was regarded as being more related to the style of Italian painter G. P. Nerli, who visited the school, than that of her father.

Misses L. & A. Hutton, listed as Dunedin artists in 1914 Wise's, were probably Nellie Laura Hutton and a sister.

Hutton exhibited with the South Canterbury Art Society, Canterbury Society of Arts and Otago Art Society.

In 1987, Hutton's works were included in a show at the Hocken Library titled Under the Spell: Frances Hodgkins, Nellie Hutton and Grace Joel.
