= Elizabeth Stevens =

New Zealand artist and teacher (1923–2008)

Elizabeth Stevens in 2006

Isabell Elizabeth Stevens (née Little; 30 June 1923 – January 2008) was a New Zealand artist and teacher based in Alexandra. She is known for her abstractionist paintings, being inspired by the rural landscape of Central Otago. Stevens was trained at the Dunedin School of Art and Dunedin Teachers College. Her work has been showcased in many national, solo and groups exhibitions and is held in multiple public collections.

== Early life and education ==
Elizabeth Stevens was born Isabell Elizabeth Little on 30 June 1923 in Woodend, Invercargill, New Zealand. Stevens spent a lot of her childhood in isolation at her grandparents' rural farm in Mossburn, which she credited for the development of her imagination. She had a strict upbringing, where reading was actively discouraged. Stevens has noted that there was no artwork in her childhood home either. At nine years old, her mother died and at fifteen she left home, having never attended secondary school.

Stevens attended the Dunedin School of Art and Dunedin Teachers College in either 1942 or 1944. There, she studied under Harry Miller, R. N. Field and Gordon Tovey to be an art specialist teacher. During her study, she was particularly captivated by American Modernists and Field's fondness for Cézanne's influence on the "over-allness" of composition.

== Career ==
Stevens was chosen by Tovey to move to Alexandra and teach high school art as part of a new Secondary Art Scheme that would develop art education across the country. However, her teaching career ended early on when in 1946 she married country newspaperman Geoffrey Stevens, and was forced to leave teaching due to a post-war policy that prohibited married women from teaching. Instead, she pursued writing, producing a Central Otago News column called "From My Armchair" under the pseudonym Horace from 1947 to 1950 and another column called "in a small place" for the Otago Daily Times under the pen name Silvester Smith from 1950 to 1951. Her writing career ended in 1956 when Stevens suffered from a spinal injury that kept her in hospital for several months.

Stevens started professionally painting in 1962. Her work was first exhibited at the Dunedin Public Library in 1964 and then three years later, a show of 52 of her pieces were exhibited at the Dunedin Public Art Gallery and purchased by then director Charlton Edgar. This period of her works is characterised by images of empty or imagined spaces inspired by the spaciousness of the Central Otago landscape.

Over the course of her career she is believed to have created over 750 pieces, yet the location of 500 of them remain unknown.

== Recognition ==
Her 1967 painting Still Point was included in Gil Docking's 1971 book Two Hundred Years of New Zealand Painting, and the subsequent editions at 240 and 250 years. Her work has been showcased in national and group exhibitions shared with other prominent New Zealand artists. She is also noted as the mentor of New Zealand artist Neil Driver.

Multiple sources on Stevens and her works cite her enthusiasm for order in her art. In 2018, Central Stories Museum and Art Gallery collected 71 of Stevens's pieces and hosted the largest exhibition of her work. This exhibition was titled Re-discover Elizabeth Stevens: Creating order from chaos. In preparation for it, the gallery asked the public for knowledge of the whereabouts of Woolshed, and for donations to purchase another painting, Differing Realties, not because of the painting itself but rather the message she had written on the back which said the painting "expresses perfectly the feeling I have about 'space', and the way I have of trying to achieve it in my work. The image of being 'visually surrounded by an imaginary 3-dimensional world' is probably the most important aspect of my painting".

Stevens's work is held in multiple public collections including at the Aigantighe Art Gallery, Dowse Art Museum, Dunedin Public Art Gallery, Eastern Southland Gallery, Hocken Collections, Invercargill Public Art Gallery, Otago Art Society, Suter Art Gallery, Southland Museum and Te Papa.

== Personal life ==
The Stevens had three children together, Kerry (born 1948), Lea (born 1950) and Miranda (born 1954). In their old age, both Stevens and her husband were diagnosed with cancer; Geoff died of the illness in 1993. Stevens died in 2008 at age 85.

== Awards and commissions ==
Over the course of her career, Stevens has received multiple commissions and won many awards.

- 1967 Printed Ephemera (mural), Alexandra
- 1968 TV film documentary; A Painter In A Landscape, filmed by Cedric Heward with DNTV
- 1976 Otago Art Society Centennial Award for And The Fire And the Rose Are One (painting)
- 1980 Caltex Award – NZFA for Dormant (painting, 1978)
- 1981 Signs and Messages (stained glass window) for the Dunedin Hospital Chapel
- 1984 Caltex Merit Award for Up The Valley (painting)
- 1992 Illustrations for the book Glad McArthur's Lifetime of Gardening
