= David Renfrew White =

New Zealand teacher (1847–1937)

- Renfrew in 1902
- Occupations: teacher, educationalist and university professor

David Renfrew White (1847–1937) was a New Zealand teacher, educationalist and university professor, born in Edinburgh, Midlothian, Scotland.
