= Auckland Museum Medals =

Awards given by Auckland War Memorial Museum, New Zealand

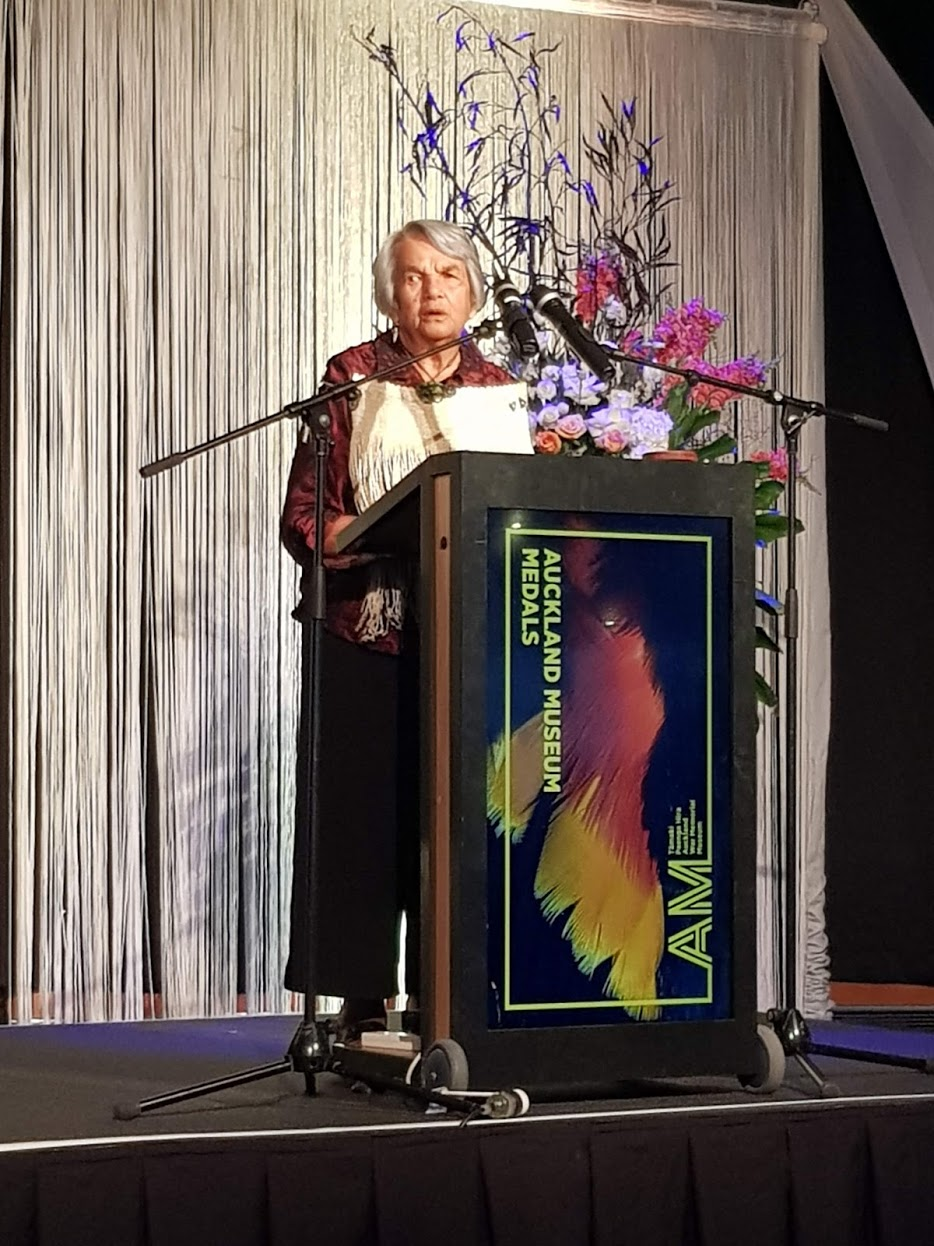
- Weaver Matekino Lawless receiving an Auckland War Memorial Museum medal in 2019
- Awarded for: Achievements or public service related to Auckland War Memorial Museum
- Country: New Zealand
- Presented by: Auckland Museum Trust Board
- First award: 1999; 27 years ago
- Website: www.aucklandmuseum.com/your-museum/get-involved/museum-medals

The Auckland Museum Medals are regular awards given by Auckland War Memorial Museum in New Zealand. First held in 1999, the awards recognise research achievements that have used the collections of the museum, public service connected to Auckland War Memorial Museum, and to former staff or volunteers to mark a significant achievement.

== History ==
The awards were established by museum director Rodney Wilson in 1998, with the first medal ceremony being held on 12 November 1999. Prior to the establishment of the medals, former staff and volunteers were typically celebrated by being awarded an honorary life membership by the Auckland Institute and Museum.

Since 2022, the medals have been cast in bronze, featuring a stylised basket of knowledge design created by artist Marté Szirmay. Prior to this, the medals were made by sculptor John Edgar O.N.Z.M., using black argillite (from Southland) and green argillite (from Nelson) bound within a circle of aluminium.

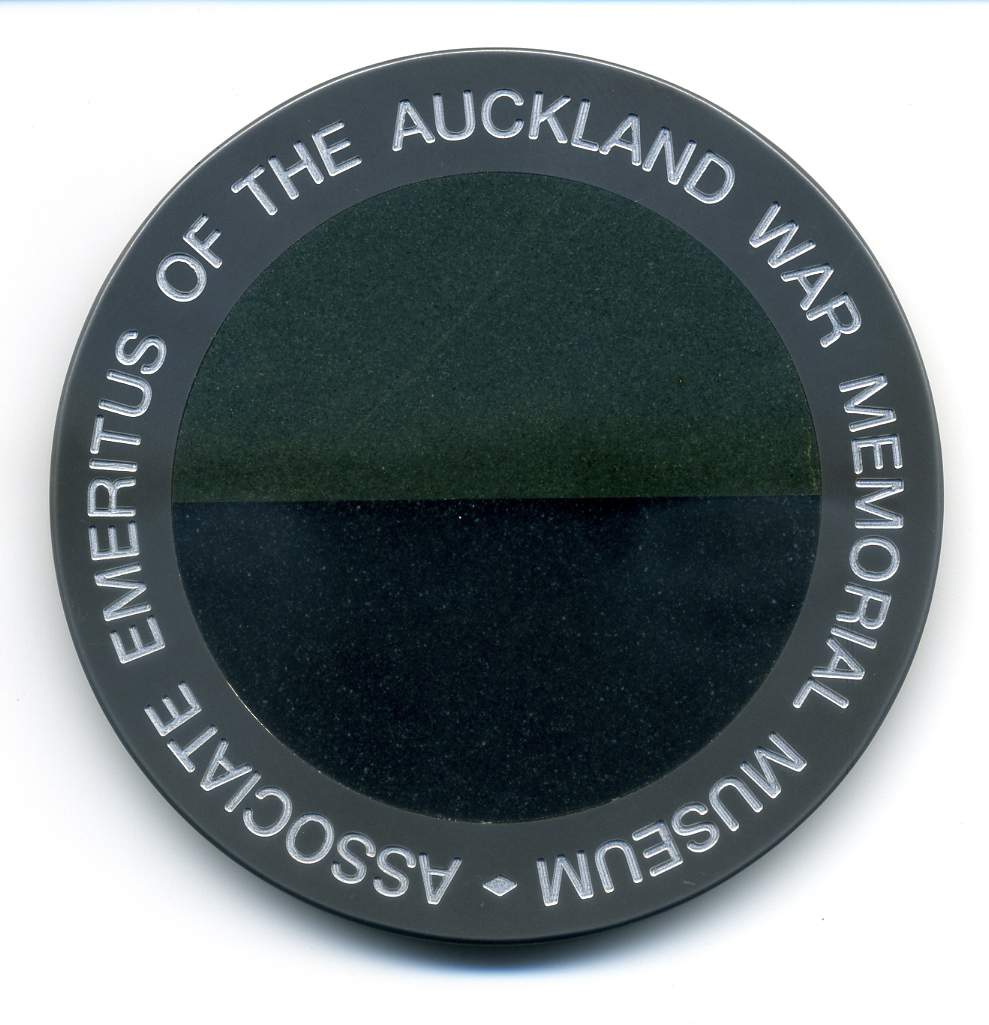
Auckland Museum medal by John Edgar, 2016; obverse; diam. 76 mm.

== Awards ==
There are three awards given as a part of the Auckland Museum Medals:

- Fellow of Auckland War Memorial Museum: this recognises scholastic achievement related to the museum collections and activities of the museum.
- Companion of Auckland War Memorial Museum: an award recognising public service connected to Auckland War Memorial Museum, or another New Zealand museum.
- Associate Emeritus of Auckland War Memorial Museum, or Associate Emerita of Auckland War Memorial Museum: an award given to former staff, research associates and volunteers marking a significant achievement. The award is typically given to former staff who have made major contributions and who want a continued link to the museum.

In addition to the three awards, Evan Graham Turbott was awarded a Lifetime Achievement Award in 2015, having previously become an Associate Emeritus of Auckland War Memorial Museum in 1999. In 2006, Sir Hugh Kāwharu was recognised as both a Fellow and Companion of the Auckland War Memorial Museum.

== Recipients ==
Year	Recipient	Award	Photograph	Ref.
2023	John Braggins	Associate Emeritus of Auckland War Memorial Museum		
2023	Susan Abasa	Companion of Auckland War Memorial Museum		
2023	Mary Ama	Companion of Auckland War Memorial Museum		
2023	Christina Hurihia Wirihana	Companion of Auckland War Memorial Museum		
2021	Marguerite Durling	Associate Emerita of Auckland War Memorial Museum		
2021	Chanel Clarke	Associate Emerita of Auckland War Memorial Museum		
2021	Sue Neureuter	Companion of Auckland War Memorial Museum		
2021	Rod Neureuter	Companion of Auckland War Memorial Museum		
2021	Zoe Neureuter	Companion of Auckland War Memorial Museum		
2021	Albert L. Refiti	Fellow of Auckland War Memorial Museum		
2019	Meryl Wright	Associate Emerita of Auckland War Memorial Museum		
2019	Doris de Pont	Companion of Auckland War Memorial Museum		
2019	Sheridan Waitai	Companion of Auckland War Memorial Museum		
2019	Wendy Nelson	Fellow of Auckland War Memorial Museum		
2018	Mike Wilcox	Associate Emeritus of Auckland War Memorial Museum		
2018	Gil Hanly	Companion of Auckland War Memorial Museum		
2018	Siobhan Leachman	Companion of Auckland War Memorial Museum		
2018	Glyn Harper	Fellow of Auckland War Memorial Museum		
2018	Matekino Lawless	Fellow of Auckland War Memorial Museum		
2017	Ngahuia Te Awekotuku	Fellow of Auckland War Memorial Museum		
2017	Stuart Park	Fellow of Auckland War Memorial Museum		
2017	John Grant-Mackie	Associate Emeritus of Auckland War Memorial Museum		
2017	Dante Bonica	Companion of Auckland War Memorial Museum		
2016	Brian Gill	Associate Emeritus of Auckland War Memorial Museum		
2016	John Ross	Associate Emeritus of Auckland War Memorial Museum		
2016	Jenny Harper	Companion of Auckland War Memorial Museum		
2016	Bil Vernon	Companion of Auckland War Memorial Museum		
2016	Danny Te Puna Tumahai	Fellow of Auckland War Memorial Museum		
2015	Evan Graham Turbott	Lifetime Achievement Award		
2015	Paul Spoonley	Companion of the Auckland War Memorial Museum		
2015	Haare Williams	Companion of Auckland War Memorial Museum		
2015	Sandra Coney	Companion of the Auckland War Memorial Museum		
2015	Anthony Wright	Associate Emeritus of Auckland War Memorial Museum		
2014	Linda Tyler	Associate Emeritus of Auckland War Memorial Museum		
2014	Margaret S. Morley	Associate Emeritus of Auckland War Memorial Museum		
2014	Cheryll Sotheran	Companion of the Auckland War Memorial Museum		
2014	Jonathan Ngarimu Mane-Wheoki	Companion of the Auckland War Memorial Museum		
2013	David Simmons	Associate Emeritus of Auckland War Memorial Museum		
2013	Ian Thwaites	Associate Emeritus of Auckland War Memorial Museum		
2013	Richard Wolfe	Associate Emeritus of Auckland War Memorial Museum		
2012	Judith Binney	Fellow of Auckland War Memorial Museum		
2012	Russell Stone	Fellow of Auckland War Memorial Museum		
2012	Roger Neich	Fellow of Auckland War Memorial Museum		
2012	Nigel Prickett	Fellow of Auckland War Memorial Museum		
2007	T.L. Rodney Wilson	Companion of Auckland War Memorial Museum		
2006	Hugh Kāwharu	Fellow and Companion of Auckland War Memorial Museum		
2005	Lyndy Sainsbury	Companion of Auckland War Memorial Museum		
2005	John M Stacpoole	Fellow of Auckland War Memorial Museum		
2005	Lorraine Wilson	Companion of Auckland War Memorial Museum		
2003	William Laxon	Companion of Auckland War Memorial Museum		
2003	Henare te Ua	Companion of Auckland War Memorial Museum		
2002	Michael King	Fellow of Auckland War Memorial Museum		
2002	John Morton	Fellow of Auckland War Memorial Museum		
2002	Lindo Ferguson	Companion of Auckland War Memorial Museum		
2002	Mick Pendergrast	Associate Emeritus of Auckland War Memorial Museum		
2002	Jeremy Salmond	Fellow of Auckland War Memorial Museum		
2002	Katrina Stamp	Associate Emeritus of Auckland War Memorial Museum		
2002	Ranginui Walker	Fellow of Auckland War Memorial Museum		
2002	Takutai Wikiriwhi	Companion of Auckland War Memorial Museum		
1999	Janet Davidson	Fellow of Auckland War Memorial Museum		
1999	Trevor Bayliss	Associate Emeritus of Auckland War Memorial Museum		
1999	Enid Evans	Associate Emeritus of Auckland War Memorial Museum		
1999	Lucy Cranwell Smith	Fellow of Auckland War Memorial Museum		
1999	Evan Graham Turbott	Associate Emeritus of Auckland War Memorial Museum		
1999	Sheila Weight	Companion of Auckland War Memorial Museum		
1999	Keith Wise	Associate Emeritus of Auckland War Memorial Museum		
