= Wilma M. Blom =

New Zealand malacologist and museum curator

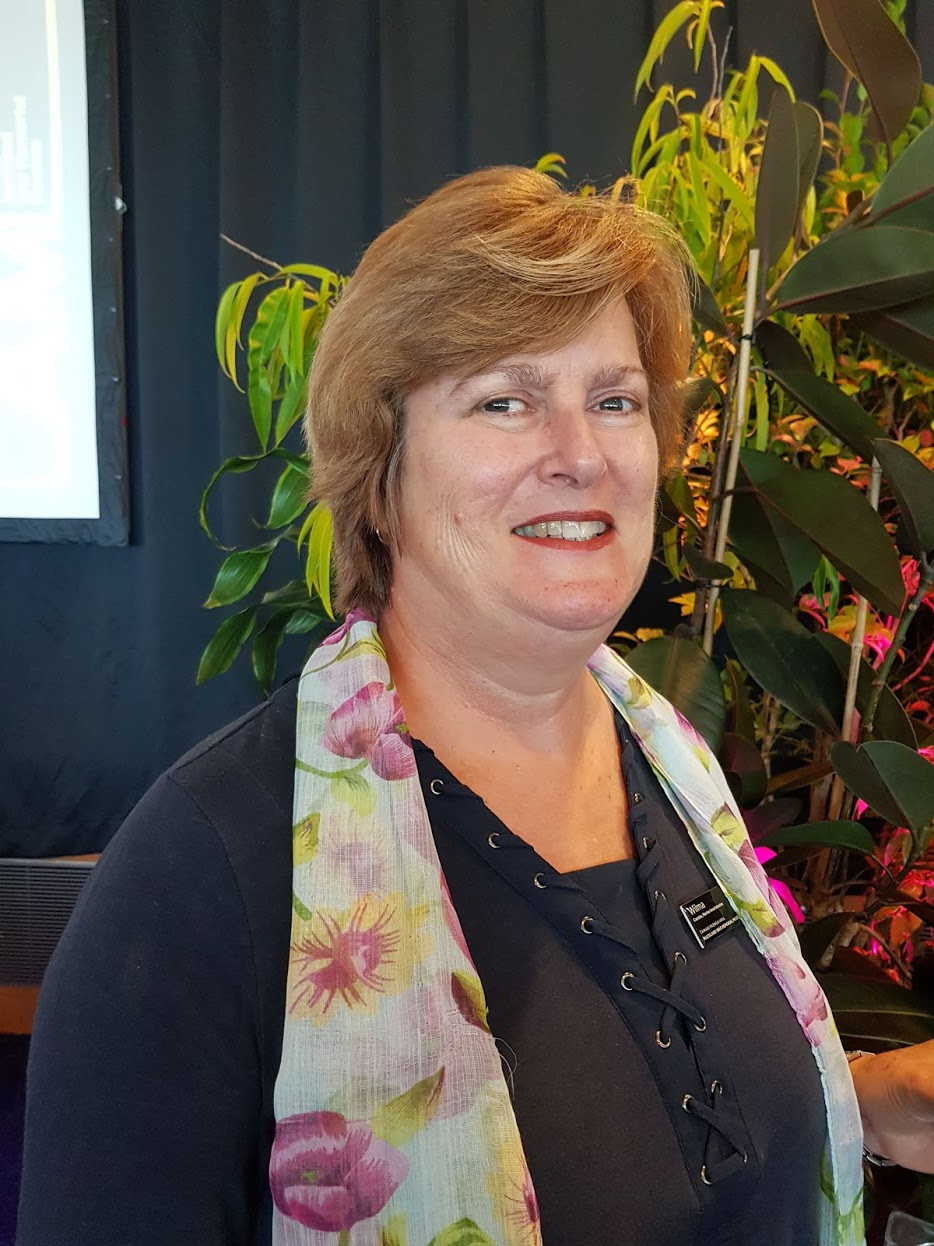
- Occupation: Marine scientist
- Scientific career
- Thesis: Sedimentology of the Tokomaru formation, Waiapu subdivision, Raukumara Peninsula (1982)

Wilma M. Blom is a marine scientist. Since 2011 she has been Curator, Marine Invertebrates at Auckland War Memorial Museum.

== Education ==
Blom studied at the University of Auckland and later University of Sydney in the 1980s, researching the sedimentology of the Raukūmara Range, and Bass Strait in Australia. In 1989, the amoeboid protist Lagena blomae, a species found in the Bass Strait, was named after Blom.

== Career and research ==
In mid-2011, Blom became the marine invertebrates curator at Auckland War Memorial Museum. Blom's work focuses on identifying marine fauna, such as molluscs. She also works in science communication, through projects such as Auckland Museum's New Zealand Marine Life app. She also organises a 2-yearly BioBlitz programme which places scientists alongside communities to help them document the biodiversity of their surrounding area, and has been involved in research projects involving The Noises. She has contributed to the collections of Auckland Museum and Te Papa.

Blom led a team that dissected a rare Taningia danae octopus, found by a fishing expedition near Whakaari / White Island in 2020.

In 2020, Blom collaborated on a project involving a Pliocene fossil trove, which was uncovered at Māngere when vertical shafts were being excavated for the Central Interceptor at Māngere Wastewater Treatment Plant. 266 fossil species were uncovered at the trove, including at least ten novel species.

== Personal life ==
Blom first began living in Auckland in 1971. Blom is interested in botanical art, and her illustration of Pteris tremula was selected for the Ngāi Tipu Taketake - Indigenous Flora exhibition held at Auckland Botanic Gardens in 2018. She is a member of the Auckland Shell Club.

== Selected research projects ==
- Blom, Wilma Maija (2025). "Annotated Catalogue of Fossil and Extant Molluscan Types in the Auckland War Memorial Museum". Bulletin of the Auckland Museum. 22. doi:10.32912/bulletin/22. OCLC 1550165130. Wikidata Q135397912.
- Blom, Wilma Maija, ed. (2013), New Zealand Marine Life, Wikidata Q123699271
- Jocqué, Merlijn Merlijn; Blom, Wilma Maija (2009). "Mysidae (Mysida) of New Zealand; a checklist, identification key to species and an overview of material in New Zealand collections". Zootaxa. 2304 (1): 1–20. doi:10.11646/zootaxa.2304.1.1. Wikidata Q97499681.
- Krug, Patrick; Morley, Margaret; Asif, Jamal; Lynette L. Hellyar; Blom, Wilma Maija (2008). "Molecular confirmation of species status for the rare cephalaspidean Melanochlamys lorrainae (Rudman, 1968), and comparison with its sister species M. cylindrica Cheeseman, 1881". Journal of Molluscan Studies. 74 (3): 267–276. doi:10.1093/mollus/eyn018. Wikidata Q54666547.
- Anderson, Marti Jane; Diebel, Carol; Blom, Wilma Maija; Landers, Todd (2005). "Consistency and variation in kelp holdfast assemblages: Spatial patterns of biodiversity for the major phyla at different taxonomic resolutions". Journal of Experimental Marine Biology and Ecology. 320 (1): 35–56. doi:10.1016/j.jembe.2004.12.023. Wikidata Q107171497. Archived from the original on 9 June 2021.
- Anderson, Marti Jane; Connell, Sean; Gillanders, Bronwyn May; Diebel, Carol; Blom, Wilma Maija; Justine E. Saunders; Landers, Todd (2005). "Relationships Between Taxonomic Resolution and Spatial Scales of Multivariate Variation". Journal of Animal Ecology. 74 (4): 636–646. doi:10.1111/j.1365-2656.2005.00959.x. Wikidata Q58306898.
- Blom, Wilma Maija; Alsop, David B. (1988). "Carbonate Mud Sedimentation on a Temperate Shelf: Bass Basin, Southeastern Australia". Sedimentary Geology. 60 (1–4): 269–280. doi:10.1016/0037-0738(88)90124-8. Wikidata Q123699106.
