= James Pond =

James Pond is the name of:

== People ==
- James Pond (Medal of Honor) (1838–1903), American abolitionist, lecture manager and Civil War officer awarded the Medal of Honor
- James Alexander Pond (1846–1941), New Zealand analytical chemist
- James Pond, birth name of Jaime St. James (born 1960), American lead vocalist and primary songwriter of the glam metal band Black 'N Blue

== Fictional characters ==
- James Pond, in the video game James Pond: Underwater Agent and two sequels
