= Margaret Morley =

Margaret Morley may refer to:

- Margaret S. Morley (1938–2016), New Zealand malacologist
- Margaret Warner Morley (1858–1923), American educator, biologist, and children's book author
