= Auckland Shell Club =

New Zealand scientific society molluscs and their shells

- Formation: 1931
- Type: Learned society, Nonprofit
- Field: Conchology, Malacology
- Website: www.aucklandshellclub.net.nz

The Auckland Shell Club, also known as the Conchology Section of the Auckland Museum Institute, is a New Zealand society concerned with the study of molluscs and their shells.

== History ==
The club first formed in 1931, as the Conchology Section of the Auckland Institute and Museum. Sections are special interest groups or organisations housed within Auckland War Memorial Museum, and the Shell Club is the oldest. It is one of only three shell clubs in New Zealand.

The first facilitator of the club was Baden Powell. Powell held weekly after-school meetings and several Auckland schoolboys attended. Powell led field trips to Hauraki Gulf islands and Mon Desir Reef in Takapuna to search for molluscs, and conducted a harbour survey, dredging the bottom of Auckland Harbour; club members would sort these dredge samples and sand for tiny shells. Charles Fleming, Peter Bull, and Richard Dell were all members of the club as teenagers. Bull went onto become an ornithologist and ecologist, Dell Curator of Molluscs at the Dominion Museum, and Fleming became a palaeontologist studying palaeobiogeography and stratigraphy. Through the Shell Club, Charles Fleming was able to meet Robert Falla and the Museum's director Gilbert Archey, both important to his later scientific career. Powell took Fleming, then aged just 14, with him to Wanganui Museum to see the Pliocene type specimens in Henry Suter's collection, and in 1933 the teenage naturalist accompanied Powell's expedition to the Chatham Islands.

The second facilitator of the club was Czech malacologist Walter Oliver Cernohorsky.

The club used to meet in a dedicated area of the Auckland War Memorial Museum's Malacology Department, where the club's library was also kept. The jubilee celebrations of the Conchology Club was held in October 1980, with a dinner at the Mon Desir Hotel and a field trip to Whangaparaoa Peninsula.

From 1962 to 2014, the shell club published Poirieria, a journal available at the Biodiversity Heritage Library.

The Auckland Shell Club takes part in the New Zealand Shell Show, an event that occurs every two years, alternatively held in Auckland and Wellington.

== Current and former members ==
- Wilma M. Blom
- Albert Eugene Brookes
- Walter Oliver Cernohorsky
- Richard Dell
- Charles Fleming
- Bruce Hayward
- Margaret S. Morley
- Winston Ponder
- Baden Powell
- Keith Arthur John Wise
