= Sheila Weight =

British servicewoman and New Zealand local-body politician

Sheila Weight MNZM JP
- Weight serving in the Women's Auxiliary Air Force circa 1940–1941
- Born: Sheila Mary Weeks; 10 January 1922
- Died: 15 July 2011 (aged 89)
- Spouse: Peter Everard Weight
- Children: 6
- Military career
- Allegiance: United Kingdom
- Branch: Women's Auxiliary Air Force

Sheila Mary Weight MNZM JP (née Weeks; 10 January 1922 – 15 July 2011) was a New Zealand local-body politician. She was the first woman to service as president of the Auckland Institute and Museum Trust Board.

== Biography ==
Weight was born Sheila Mary Weeks in London, England, on 10 January 1922, and served in the Women's Auxiliary Air Force during World War II. She emigrated to New Zealand in 1946, and subsequently married Peter Everard Weight. The couple went on to have six children.

Later in life, Sheila Weight served as a councillor on the One Tree Hill Borough Council and represented the borough on the Trust Board of the Auckland Institute and Museum. From 1982, she also served as vice-president of the institute, becoming the president in 1986. She was the first woman to be elected to either position. She was appointed to be a justice of the peace in 1985.

In the 1999 New Year Honours, Weight was appointed a Member of the New Zealand Order of Merit, for services to the community. In the same year, Weight received an Auckland Museum Medal, becoming a Companion of Auckland War Memorial Museum.

Weight died on 15 July 2011. Her husband, Peter, died in 2013.
