= Josiah Martin (teacher) =

New Zealand teacher and photographer

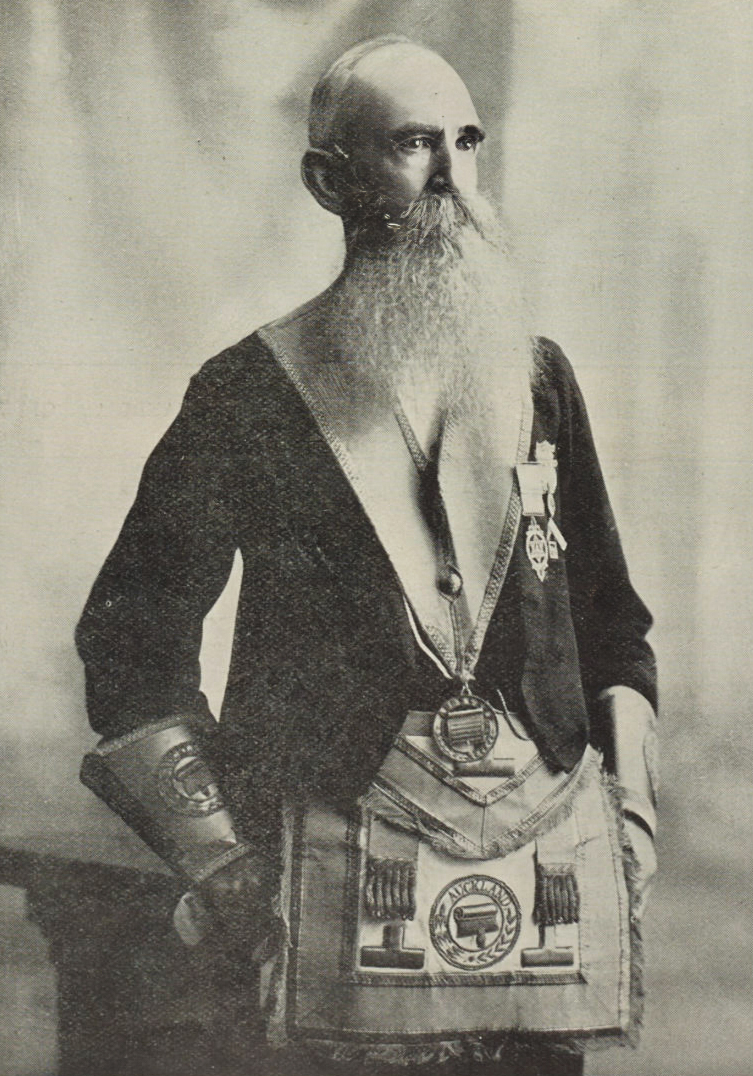
- Martin in Masonic regalia, 1903
- Born: 1 August 1843; London, England
- Died: 29 September 1916 (aged 73); Auckland, New Zealand
- Occupation: Photographer

Josiah Martin (1 August 1843 – 29 September 1916) was a New Zealand teacher, photographer and prominent Auckland Freemason.

== Early life ==
Martin was born in London, England, to mother Charlotte Bromley and father Josiah Martin. Martin worked first in an insurance office, then as a coal merchant while in England. In 1864, he married Caroline Mary Wakefield, and in 1867 the couple moved to New Zealand with their daughter.

== Career ==
Martin's first work experiences in New Zealand were in farming and operating a school in Northland region town, Maungaturoto. Martin was one of the founding members of the Grafton District School and remained headmaster there until 1874. In 1875, Martin helped to set up the Auckland Model Training School, which was the first of its kind in Auckland. He was also instrumental in founding the Auckland School Teachers Association in 1873 which aimed to create a national education program and fought for educational reform.

In 1879 Martin was urged to retire from his teaching and headmaster roles due to poor health and changes in the education system. He then turned his attentions to photography.

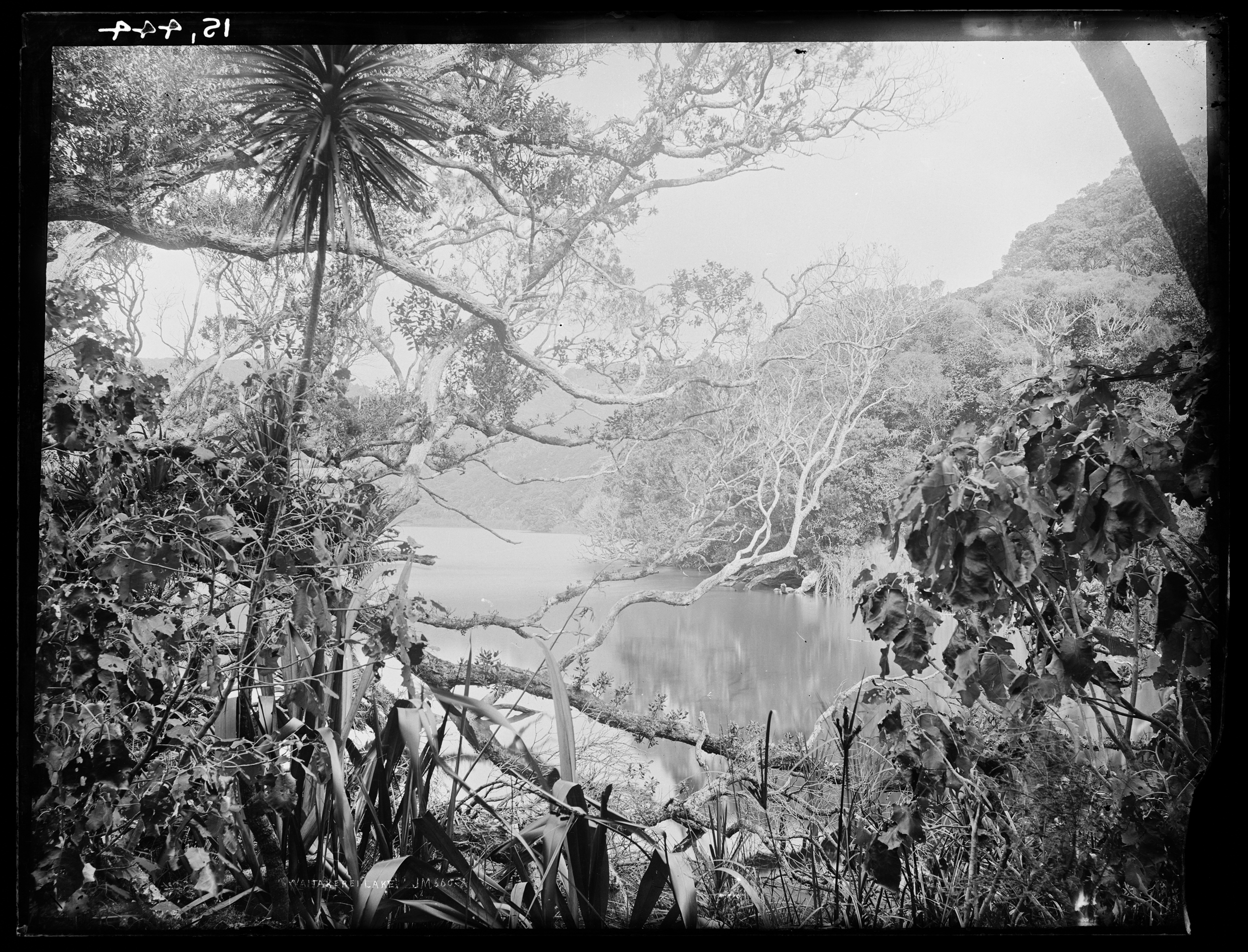
Lake Wainamu by Josiah Martin

In 1879, he traveled to London and was introduced to rapid 'instantaneous' photography at the Royal College of Chemistry. Once he returned to New Zealand, he opened a studio in Auckland. Martin became well known for his topographical and ethnological photographs. He often presented these at the Auckland Photographic Club. In 1886, Martin captured the eruption of Mt Tarawera on camera. These photographs were published in the Auckland Evening Star. Martin has also been published in the Auckland Weekly News, New Zealand Illustrated and exhibited photographs at the Pitt Rivers Museum at the University of Oxford. In 1886, he was part of the Colonial and Indian Exhibition and was awarded a gold medal in 1889 for his work in the Exposition Coloniale in Paris. Martin's photographs appeared in the French illustrated press through the photo-agency Chusseau-Flaviens.

Martin was an active lecturer, not only on photography matters but he also had an interest in geological and physiological subjects. He was editor of Sharlands New Zealand Photographer and a founding member of the Auckland Society of Arts. Martin served on the Auckland Institute Council from 1881 to 1892 and was the President of the Council in 1889.

== Legacy ==
Martin died on 29 September 1916 at his Auckland home in Northcote at age 73.

An exert from his obituary in The New Zealand Herald reads:

Mr. Martin was a man of many parts, social, artistic, and scientific. In matters photographic he was one of the first men in New Zealand to exploit the scenic wealth of the country and his photographs of New Zealand panoramic beauty had great vogue some 30 years ago, long before the State formed a Tourist Department and took in hand the advertising of the special attractions of the country. Probably Mr. Martin's photographs did more to bring the Rotomahana Terraces and other thermal wonders of the Auckland Province under the notice of the world than any other medium. New Zealand Herald, Volume LIII, Issue 16350, 3 October 1916

In 1958 his three daughters donated his collection of negatives to the Auckland Institute and Museum. These collections have been displayed at Auckland War Memorial Museum such as in the 2024 exhibition, 'A Different Light- First Photographs of Aotearoa'.

Te Papa, Auckland Art Gallery and the British Museum also house collections of Martin's photographic works.
