= Gil Hanly =

New Zealand artist

Gil Hanly ONZM
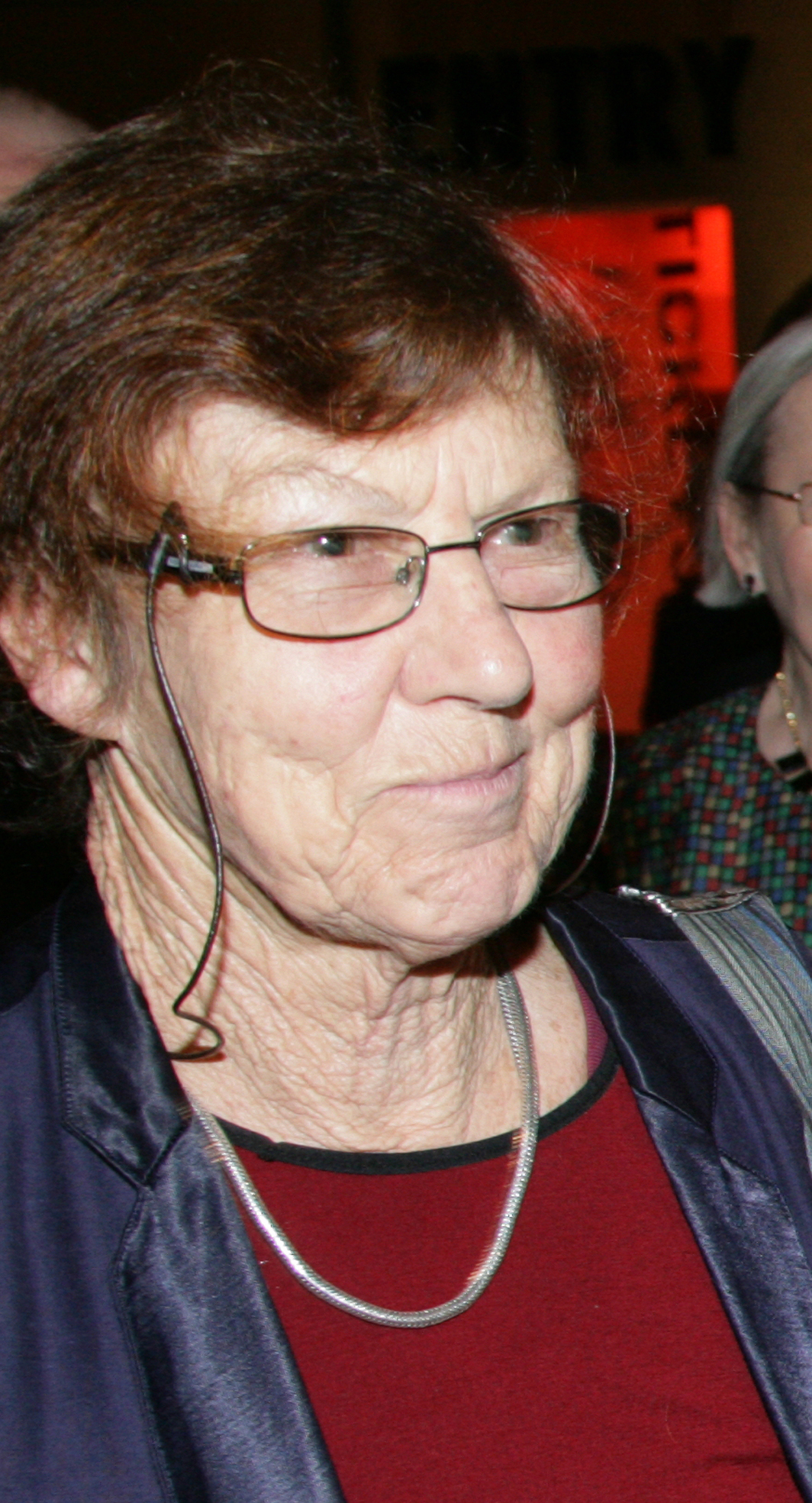
- Hanly in 2007
- Born: Gillian Mary Taverner; 1934 (age 91–92); Levin, New Zealand
- Known for: Photography

Gillian Mary Hanly ONZM (née Taverner; born 1934), known professionally as Gil Hanly, is a New Zealand artist. She is best known for documenting protests and social movements in New Zealand's recent history, including the 1981 Springbok tour, the sinking of the Rainbow Warrior and the protests at Bastion Point.

== Early life ==
Hanly was born in 1934 in Levin, New Zealand. She has two younger brothers. She grew up on a sheep farm between the sea and the town of Bulls, where the family worked hard to contribute. She was home schooled until the age of 12, when she was sent to Nga Tawa school in Marton. She attended the Ilam School of Fine Arts in Christchurch in the early 1950s, where she trained to be a painter. She met her husband Pat Hanly while at Ilam.

== Career ==
After she graduated from university she moved to London for five years, where she worked as a props buyer for a production company. She and her husband lived and travelled around London, Spain and Italy during this period. The family moved back to New Zealand in the early 1960s, living in Mount Eden, Auckland. She worked at the University Bookshop for a decade, and began working for the feminist publication Broadsheet in 1972.

== Artistic career ==
Hanly became one of the leading social documentary photographers in New Zealand in the 1970s and 1980s, photographing events such as the 1981 Springbok tour, the sinking of the Greenpeace ship Rainbow Warrior, the protest at Bastion Point, the 1984 land hīkoi, 1980s anti-nuclear protests, the beginning of the kōhanga reo Māori language immersion school movement, Homosexual Law Reform protests and Reclaim the Night marches. She has also documented the Queen Street riots and outrage at the murder of Teresa Cormack. Her photographs of the women's movement in the 1970s and 1980s featured prominently in the exhibition at Auckland War Memorial Museum, Are We There Yet? She says she is attracted to things "that were important". Hanly's photographic collections include images of public figures including the Topp Twins, Claudia Pond Eyley, Carole Shepheard, Hone Harawira and Helen Clark.

She does not describe herself as a photographic artist, but rather she sees herself as a "documenter".

== Recognition ==
In 1993 Hanly was awarded a New Zealand Suffrage Centennial Medal. In the 1999 Queen's Birthday Honours, Hanly was appointed an Officer of the New Zealand Order of Merit, for services to photography.

In 2014 and 2015, Hanly donated much of her photographic collections to the Auckland War Memorial Museum, totalling approximately 144,000 images. In 2019, she was awarded an Auckland Museum Medal, becoming a Companion of Auckland War Memorial Museum.

== Personal life ==
Hanly was married to the painter Pat Hanly until he died in 2004. She has two children with Pat, and her husband had another daughter in a different relationship. While associated with the long-running feminist magazine Broadsheet, Hanly does not consider herself a feminist.

Outside of social documentary photography, Hanly has an interest in photographing gardens.
