= Bruce Hayward =

New Zealand scientist (born 1950)

Bruce Hayward CNZM FRSNZ
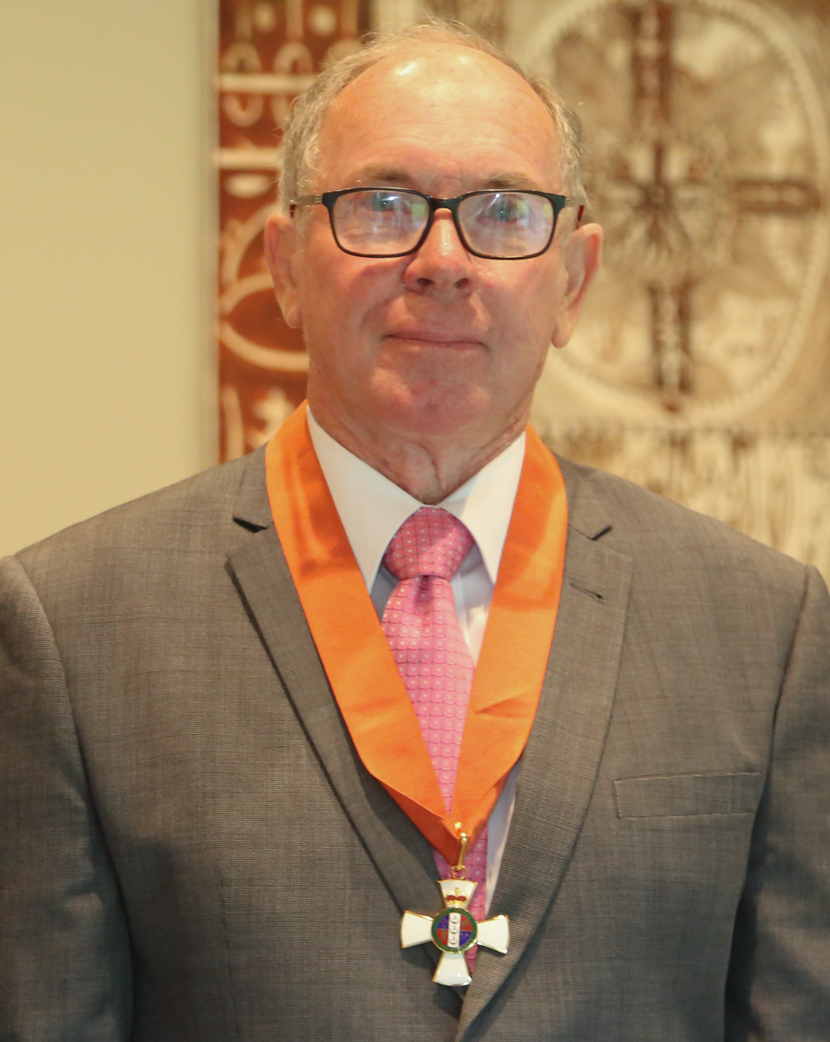
- Hayward in 2026
- Born: Bruce William Hayward; 1950 (age 75–76)
- Education: University of Auckland
- Scientific career
- Fields: Geologist, marine ecology
- Thesis: Lower Miocene geology of the Waitakere Hills, west Auckland, with emphasis on the paleontology (1975)
- Doctoral advisor: Philippa Black, Graham Gibson, Peter Ballance

Bruce William Hayward CNZM FRSNZ (born 1950) is a New Zealand geologist, marine ecologist, and author. He is known as a leading expert on living and fossil foraminifera.

== Education and career ==
At the University of Auckland, Hayward graduated in geology with BSc (Hons) in 1971 and PhD in 1975. In 1976–1977, he was a postdoc at the Smithsonian Institution in Washington, D.C. From 1978 to 1991, Hayward was a micropaleontologist for the New Zealand Geological Survey, Lower Hutt. In March 1991, Hayward became the curator of marine invertebrates at the Auckland Institute and Museum, after the retirement of Walter Olivier Cernohorsky. From 1997 to 2002, he was a self-employed research associate in the Geology Department of the University of Auckland, as well as from 1998 to 2000, a James Cook Research Fellow at the University of Auckland. In 2003, he became the founder and principal scientist of Geomarine Research, located in Auckland. He was the principal scientist for three Marsden Fund grants: from 2000 to 2002 "Foraminifera and paleoceanography of Bounty Trough, east New Zealand", from 2003 to 2005 "The last global marine extinction: causes and consequences for global biodiversity", and from 2007 to 2010 "Causes of evolution and global extinction in the deep sea". In addition to his research on foraminifera, he has done research on "northern New Zealand geology and landforms, marine invertebrate ecology, industrial archaeology and lichens."

Hayward was, from 1980 to 1989, an editor for the Geological Society of New Zealand, from 1988 to 2012, an associate editor for the Journal of Foraminiferal Research, and from 2010, chief editor for Foraminifera, World Register of Marine Species. He is founder and convenor (1984–present) of the New Zealand Geopreservation Inventory and from 1990 to 1993, a member of the New Zealand Conservation Authority and from 1993 to 1996 a member of the Auckland Conservation Board. He co-founded the Offshore Islands Research Group in 1977 and co-founded the Auckland Geology Club in 1993. He is the author or co-author of "over 1000 publications, including more than 280 peer-reviewed papers, hundreds of popular articles, 13 scientific monographs and more than 20 popular books."

== Legacy ==
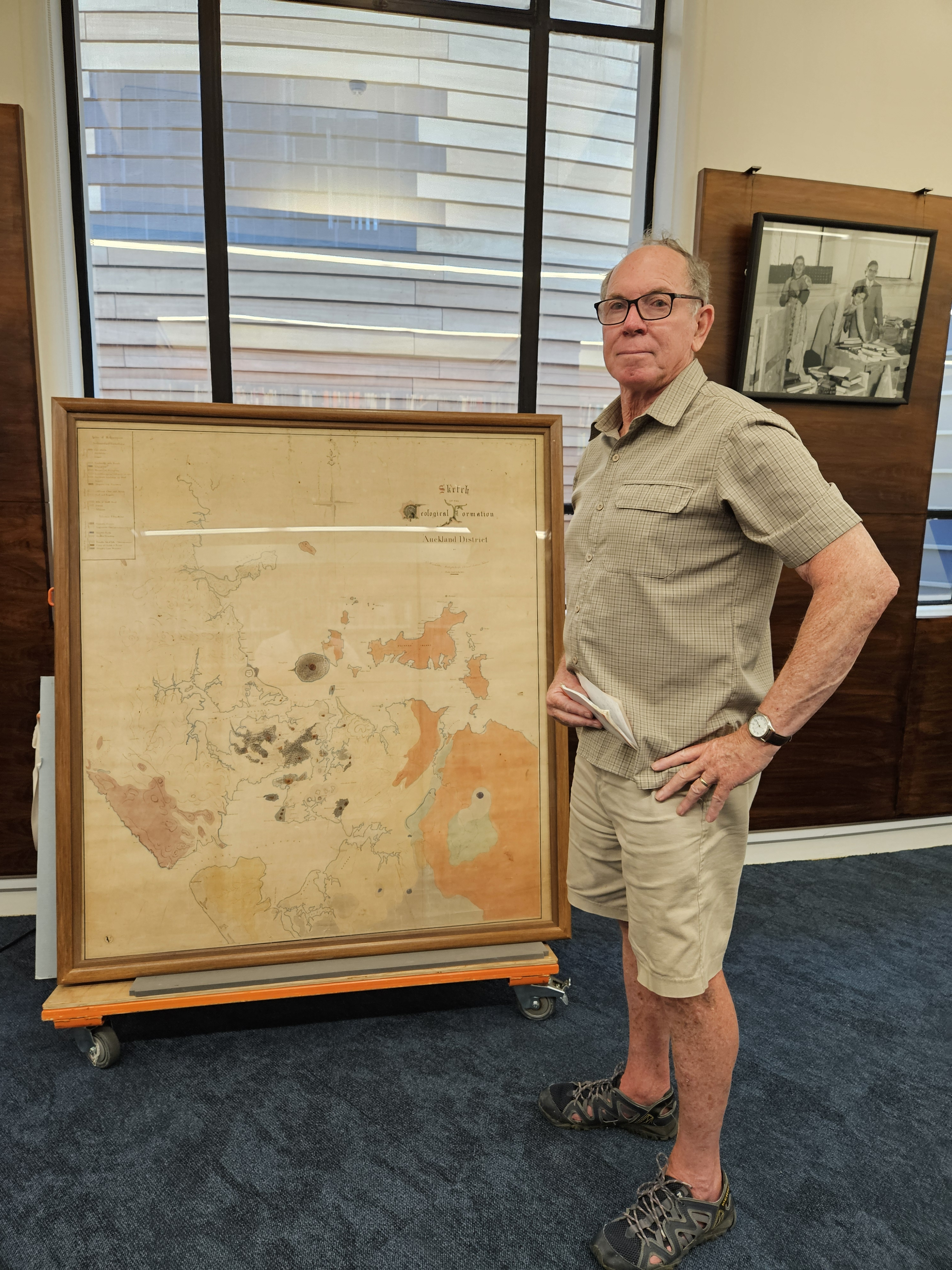
Hayward in 2024, standing beside Ferdinand von Hochstetter's Sketch of the Geological Formation of the Auckland District (c. 1859) at the Auckland Museum Research Library

The New Zealand foliose lichen species Pseudocyphellaria haywardiorum was named after Bruce and Glenys Hayward in 1988 by David Galloway, after the pair collected the type specimen of the species in 1971, on Red Mercury Island. Also the lichens: Flavoparmelia haywardiana Elix and Johnston 1988 Lecanora haywardiorum Lumbsch 1994 Buellia haywardii Elix, A.Knight & H.Mayrhofer, 2017 Foraminifera: Palliolatella haywardi Kawagata, 2016 Tubulogenerina haywardi Gibson 1989 Rhombobolivinella haywardi Popescu & Crihan, 2005 Quinqueloculina haywardi Parker & Le Coze, 2025 Ostracoda: Microcytherura haywardi Milhau, 1993 Radiolarian: Lophocyrtis (Lophocyrtis) haywardi O’Conner, 1999.

== Awards and honours ==
- 1978 — McKay Hammer Award of Geological Society of NZ for publications on "Waitakere Ranges geology"
- 1988 — New Zealand Association of Scientists Research Medal
- 1989–1991 — President of the Geological Society of New Zealand
- 2001 — elected Honorary Life Member of New Zealand Marine Sciences Society
- 2003 — elected a Fellow of the Royal Society Te Apārangi
- 2006 — Hochstetter Lecturer of the Geological Society of New Zealand
- 2006 — appointed a Member of the New Zealand Order of Merit (MNZM) in the 2006 Queen's Birthday Honours, for services to earth science and conservation
- 2013 — McKay Hammer Award of Geoscience Society of NZ for publications on "The last global extinction (Mid-Pleistocene) of deep-sea benthic foraminifera"
- 2013 — elected Honorary Life Member of Geoscience Society of New Zealand.
- 2017 — Joseph A. Cushman Medal for Excellence in Foraminiferal Research
- 2018 — Hutton Medal of the Royal Society Te Apārangi for "outstanding contributions to the knowledge of New Zealand's marine ecology and geology"

In the 2026 New Year Honours, Hayward was promoted to Companion of the New Zealand Order of Merit, for services to geology, particularly micropaleontology.

== Selected publications ==
=== Scientific publications ===
- Hayward, Bruce W.; Buzas, Martin A. (1979). Taxonomy and paleoecology of Early Miocene benthic foraminifera of northern New Zealand and the north Tasman Sea. Washington, DC: Smithsonian Contributions to Paleobiology 36. p. 154.
- Hayward, Bruce W. (1990). Taxonomy, paleogeography and evolutionary history of the Bolivinellidae (Foraminiferida). Lower Hutt: New Zealand Geological Survey Paleontology Bulletin 63, 132 p.
- Hayward, Bruce W.; Hollis, C.J.; Grenfell, H.R. (1997). Recent Elphidiidae (Foraminiferida) of the South-west Pacific and fossil Elphidiidae of New Zealand. Lower Hutt: New Zealand Geological Survey Paleontology Bulletin 72, 166 p.
- Hayward, Bruce W.; Grenfell, H.R.; Reid, C.M.; Hayward, J.J. (1999). Recent New Zealand shallow-water benthic foraminifera: Taxonomy, ecologic distribution, biogeography, and use in paleoenvironmental assessment. Lower Hutt: Institute of Geological and Nuclear Sciences Monograph 21, 258 p.
- Hayward, Bruce W.; Grenfell, Hugh R.; Scott, David B. (1999). "Tidal range of marsh foraminifera for determining former sea-level heights in New Zealand". New Zealand Journal of Geology and Geophysics. 42 (3): 395–413. doi:10.1080/00288306.1999.9514853.'
- Hayward, Bruce W.; Black, Philippa M.; Smith, Ian E. M.; Ballance, Peter F.; Itaya, Tetsumaru; Doi, Masako; Takagi, Miki; Bergman, Steve; Adams, Chris J.; Herzer, Richard H.; Robertson, David J. (2001). "K-Ar ages of early Miocene arc-type volcanoes in northern New Zealand". New Zealand Journal of Geology and Geophysics. 44 (2): 285–311. doi:10.1080/00288306.2001.9514939. hdl:2292/4872. S2CID 128957126.
- Hayward, Bruce W.; Neil, Helen; Carter, Rowan; Grenfell, Hugh R.; Hayward, Jessica J. (2002). "Factors influencing the distribution patterns of Recent deep-sea benthic foraminifera, east of New Zealand, Southwest Pacific Ocean". Marine Micropaleontology. 46 (1–2): 139–176. Bibcode:2002MarMP..46..139H. doi:10.1016/S0377-8398(02)00047-6.
- Hayward, Bruce W.; Scott, George H.; Grenfell, Hugh R.; Carter, Rowan; Lipps, Jere H. (2004). "Techniques for estimation of tidal elevation and confinement (~salinity) histories of sheltered harbours and estuaries using benthic foraminifera: Examples from New Zealand". The Holocene. 14 (2): 218–232. Bibcode:2004Holoc..14..218H. doi:10.1191/0959683604hl678rp. S2CID 129699465.
- Hayward, Bruce W.; Grenfell, Hugh R.; Sabaa, Ashwaq T.; Carter, Rowan; Cochran, Ursula; Lipps, Jere H.; Shane, Phil R.; Morley, Margaret S. (2006). "Micropaleontological evidence of large earthquakes in the past 7200 years in southern Hawke's Bay, New Zealand". Quaternary Science Reviews. 25 (11–12): 1186–1207. Bibcode:2006QSRv...25.1186H. doi:10.1016/j.quascirev.2005.10.013. ISSN 0277-3791.
- Gehrels, W. Roland; Hayward, Bruce W.; Newnham, Rewi M.; Southall, Katherine E. (2008). "A 20th century acceleration of sea-level rise in New Zealand". Geophysical Research Letters. 35 (2): L02717. Bibcode:2008GeoRL..35.2717G. doi:10.1029/2007GL032632.
- Hayward, Bruce W.; Grenfell, H.R.; Sabaa, A.T.; Neil, H.L.; Buzas, M.A. (2010). Recent New Zealand deep-water benthic foraminifera: Taxonomy, ecologic distribution, biogeography, and use in paleoenvironmental assessment. Lower Hutt: Institute of Geological and Nuclear Sciences Monograph 26, 363 p.
- Hayward, Bruce W.; Kawagata, S.; Sabaa, A.T.; Grenfell, H.R.; van Kerckhoven, L.; Johnson, K.; Thomas, E. (2012). The last global extinction (Mid-Pleistocene) of deep-sea benthic foraminifera (Chrysalogoniidae, Ellipsoidinidae, Glandulonodosariidae, Plectofrondiculariidae, Pleursostomellidae, Stilostomellidae), their Late Cretaceous-Cenozoic history and taxonomy. Washington DC: Cushman Foundation for Foraminiferal Research Special Publication 43, 408 p.
- Hayward, Bruce W.; Holzmann, Maria; Langer, Martin R.; Parker, Justin H.; Tsuchiya, Masashi (2025). "Molecular and morphological taxonomy and biogeography of living Cribroelphidiellidae, Elphidiellidae, Elphidiidae, Haynesinidae and related taxa (Foraminifera, Rotalioidea)". Micropaleontology. 71 (5–6). New York: 433–808. doi:10.47894/mpal.71.5.01.
- Hayward, Bruce W.; Holzmann, M.; Pawlowski, J.; Parker, J.H.; Kaushik, T.; Toyofuku, M.S.; Tsuchiya, M. (2021). Molecular and morphological taxonomy of living Ammonia and related taxa (Foraminifera) and their biogeography. New York: Micropaleontology 67, issues 2-3, 204 p.

=== Books ===
- Diamond, John T.; Hayward, B. W. (1975). Kauri timber dams. Auckland: Lodestar Press.
- Hayward, Bruce W. (1978). Kauaeranga kauri: a pictorial history of the kauri timber industry in the Kauaeranga Valley, Thames. Auckland: Lodestar Press.
- Hayward, Bruce W. (1979). Ancient undersea volcanoes: A guide to the geological formations at Muriwai, west Auckland. Lower Hutt: Geological Society of New Zealand Guidebook 3.
- Diamond, John T.; Hayward, B. W. (1979). The Maori history and legends of the Waitakere Ranges. Auckland: Lodestar Press.
- Hayward, Bruce W.; Hayward, Selwyn P. (1979). Cinemas of Auckland, 1896-1979. Auckland, New Zealand: Lodestar Press.
- Diamond, John T.; Hayward, B. W. (1980). Waitakere Kauri=Auckland. Lodestar Press.
- Hayward, Bruce W. (1987). Granite and Marble: A guide to building stones in New Zealand. Lower Hutt: Geological Society of New Zealand Guidebook 8.
- Hayward, Bruce W. (1989). Kauri gum and the gumdiggers. Auckland, NZ: Bush Press.
- Hayward, Bruce W. (1990). Trilobites, dinosaurs, and moa bones: the story of New Zealand fossils. Auckland: Bush Press; with illustrations and photography by the author
- Diamond, John T.; Hayward, Bruce W. (1991). Kauri timber days. A pictorial account of the kauri timer industry in New Zealand. Auckland, NZ: Bush Press.
- Hayward, Bruce W. (1996). Precious Land: Protecting New Zealand's landforms and geological features. Lower Hutt: Geological Society of New Zealand Guidebook 12.
- Cox, Geoffrey J.; Hayward, Bruce W. (1999). Restless country : volcanoes and earthquakes of New Zealand. Auckland, N.Z.: HarperCollins Publishers (NZ).
- Cameron, Ewan; Hayward, Bruce; Murdoch, Graeme J. (2008) [1998]. Field guide to Auckland : exploring the region's natural and historical heritage (2nd revised ed.). Auckland: Random House New Zealand.
- Kenny, Jill A.; Hayward, Bruce W. (2010). Karst in Stone. Karst landscapes in New Zealand: A case for protection. Lower Hutt: Geological Society of New Zealand Guidebook 16.
- Hayward, Bruce W.; Murdoch, Graeme J.; Maitland, Gordon (2011). Volcanoes of Auckland : The Essential Guide. Auckland, N.Z.: Auckland University Press. ISBN 978-186940-479-6; aerial photography by Alastair Jamieson
- Jill A., Kenny; Hayward, Bruce W. (2013). On the edge: Celebrating the diversity of New Zealand's coastal landforms. Lower Hutt: Geological Society of New Zealand Guidebook 17.
- Hayward, Bruce W. (2017). Out of the ocean, into the fire : history in the rocks, fossils and landforms of Auckland, Northland and Coromandel. Wellington, New Zealand: Geoscience Society of New Zealand; aerial photography by Alastair Jamieson; drawings by Margaret S. Morley. The book recounts "the fascinating geological history of the formation of Northland, Auckland and the Coromandel Peninsula and the history of its past animal and plant life."
- Hayward, Bruce W. (2019). Volcanoes of Auckland: a field guide. Auckland, New Zealand: Auckland University Press; aerial photography by Alastair Jamieson ebook
