= Colin Knight (educationalist) =

New Zealand educationalist

Colin Knight ONZM
- Born: Colin Leslie Knight; 2 September 1934; Rotherham, New Zealand
- Died: 14 April 2016 (aged 81)
- Education: University of Georgia
- Spouse: Noela Yvonne Harman (m. 1958)
- Scientific career
- Workplaces: Christchurch Teachers' College
- Thesis: An international study of relationships between geographic knowledge of students and their attitude to other nationalities (1982)
- Doctoral advisor: Marion Jennings Rice

Colin Leslie Knight (2 September 1934 – 14 April 2016) was a New Zealand educationalist. He served as principal of the Christchurch Teachers' College from 1986 to 1995.

== Early life and family ==
Born at Rotherham, North Canterbury, on 2 September 1934, Knight was the son of James Percy Knight and Rosetta Knight (née Beaman). He studied at Canterbury University College, from where he graduated Master of Arts with second-class honours in 1958. The same year he married Noela Yvonne Harman; the couple went on to have two children.

== Career ==
Knight began his teaching career at Ashburton High School in 1957, before moving to Burnside High School in Christchurch in 1960. He was a senior lecturer at Christchurch Teachers' College from 1966 to 1972 and then an inspector of schools from 1973 to 1984.

In 1982, Knight was conferred the degree of Doctor of Education by the University of Georgia. His thesis, supervised by Marion Rice, was entitled An international study of relationships between geographic knowledge of students and their attitude to other nationalities.

Knight served as the Canterbury regional superintendent of education between 1984 and 1986, when he was appointed a principal of Christchurch Teachers' College. During his tenure, the college underwent major restructuring, moving from State control to almost complete autonomy, and was renamed the Christchurch College of Education. Knight retired in 1995. He also served as president of the New Zealand Council for Educational Research, and vice president of the New Zealand Council for Teacher Education.

In the 1999 New Year Honours, Knight was appointed an Officer of the New Zealand Order of Merit, for services to education.

Knight wrote a number of textbooks for secondary school students, including Becoming a New Zealander (1970), The Instant Society (1972), and New Zealand Geography: a Systems Approach (with John Buckland and Frank McPherson; 1973).

== Politics ==
At the 1969 general election, Knight ran for Parliament as the National Party candidate in Christchurch Central. He came second, 3406 votes behind the Labour candidate, Bruce Barclay.

== Later life and death ==
Knight was set to chair the board of the Christchurch Baccalaureate College, which was set to open in 2002. However, the school failed financially in August 2001 and never opened. A lover of rhododendrons, Knight served as president of the Canterbury Rhododendron Society.

Knight died on 14 April 2016.
