= Pauline Kingi =

New Zealand businesswoman

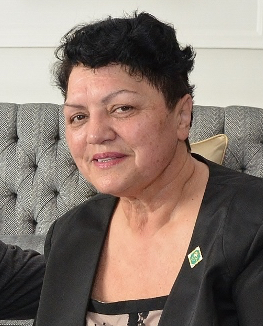
Kingi in 2015

Pauline Kumeroa Kingi CNZM (born 3 May 1951 in Napier, New Zealand is a Māori community leader.

== Biography ==
Pauline Kingi received an LL.M. from Harvard and was admitted as a barrister and solicitor in 1980 and is also a corporate director, with membership of both the Institute of Directors and the New Zealand Institute of Management. Her extensive community and public sector involvement has spanned over 28 years.

She is a past chancellor of the Auckland University of Technology and lodged the application for AIT to become the first University of Technology in New Zealand, and is credited as being a key contributor in the making of AUT. In June 2004, she was elected to the New Zealand Institute of Management, Auckland Division, and is the first Māori to be appointed to this body.

In 1993, Kingi was awarded the New Zealand Suffrage Centennial Medal, and in the 1999 New Year Honours, she was appointed a Companion of the New Zealand Order of Merit, for services to the community. In 2000, she was selected for an inaugural Manawahine Award, from the Māori Women’s Welfare League, and received this Award from Te Arikinui, Dame Te Atairangikaahu.
