= Peter Beadle (artist) =

New Zealand artist (1933–2021)

Peter Beadle ONZM (1933 – February 2021) was a New Zealand artist based in Arrowtown. In 2010, he and his son Simon opened an art gallery called the Arrowtown Gallery. He had three books published about landscapes in the South Island of New Zealand. The books contain paintings and sketches by Peter with descriptive text also written by him. In the 1999 New Year Honours, he was appointed an Officer of the New Zealand Order of Merit, for services to painting.
