= University of Canterbury Faculty of Education =

Educational institute based in Christchurch, New Zealand

- Ako
- Other names: Christchurch Teachers College (1877–2007), Christchurch College of Education, Health and Human Development (2008–2022).
- Type: Public school of education
- Established: 1877
- Parent institution: University of Canterbury
- Location: Dovedale / Ilam, Christchurch, New Zealand

The Faculty of Education is a faculty of the University of Canterbury. Formerly the Christchurch College of Education, it was founded in 1877. In 2007 it was merged with the university and became a fully fledged faculty.

The educationalist Colin Knight was principal from 1986 to 1995.
