= 1999 New Year Honours (New Zealand) =

Annual awards for New Zealanders

- Previous: 1998 Queen's Birthday Honours; Next: 1999 Queen's Birthday Honours
- Type: New Zealand royal honours: Order of New Zealand; New Zealand Order of Merit; Queen's Service Order; Queen's Service Medal
- Date: 31 December 1998
- Country: New Zealand
- Total recipients: 172

The 1999 New Year Honours in New Zealand were appointments by Elizabeth II in her right as Queen of New Zealand, on the advice of the New Zealand government, to various orders and honours to reward and highlight good works by New Zealanders, and to celebrate the passing of 1998 and the beginning of 1999. They were announced on 31 December 1998.

The recipients of honours are listed here as they were styled before their new honour.

== Order of New Zealand (ONZ) ==
Ordinary member

- Kenneth George Douglas – of Porirua.
- Clifford Hamilton Whiting – of Russell.
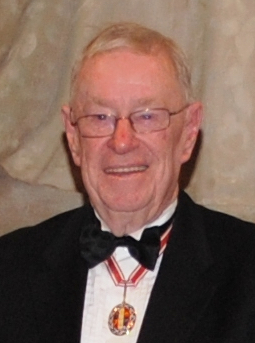
Ken Douglas

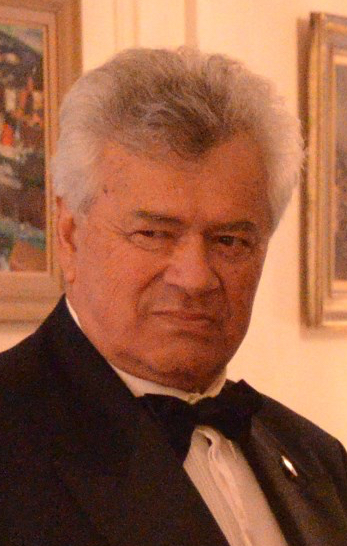
Cliff Whiting

== New Zealand Order of Merit ==
=== Dame Companion (DNZM) ===
- Cheryll Beatrice Sotheran – of Wellington. For services to museum administration.

=== Knight Companion (KNZM) ===
- Robert James Charles CBE – of Oxford. For services to golf.
- Selwyn John Cushing CMG – of Hastings. For services to business, sport and the arts.
- Douglas Arthur Montrose Graham MP – of Auckland. For services as a Minister of the Crown and Member of Parliament.
- Donald Rees Llewellyn CBE JP – of Hamilton. For services to agriculture and the community.
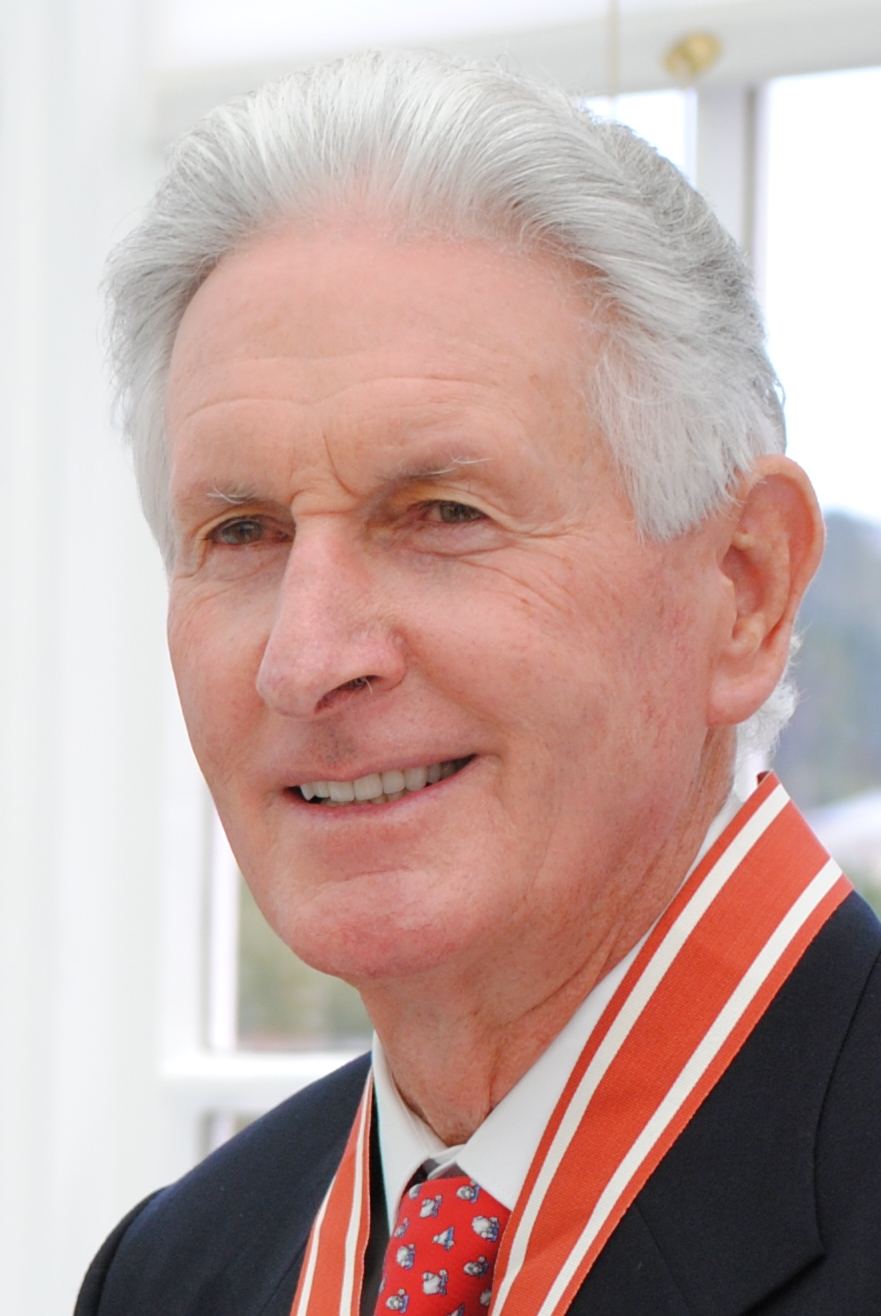
Sir Bob Charles

=== Companion (CNZM) ===
- Campbell William Ballantyne – of Christchurch. For services to the community.
- Zena Isabel Daysh – of London, United Kingdom. For services to human ecology.
- Brian Finbar Myram Edwards – of Auckland. For services to broadcasting and journalism.
- Professor Robert Bartlett Elliott – of Auckland. For services to medical research.
- Martha Friedlander (Marti Friedlander) – of Auckland. For services to photography.
- William Murray Gallagher MBE – of Hamilton. For services to business and export.
- David Robert Henry – of Upper Hutt. For services as commissioner of Inland Revenue.
- Ernest Albert James Holdaway OBE DFC JP – of Auckland. For services to conservation.
- Patricia Charmaine Judd JP – of Auckland. For services to health administration and the community.
- Pauline Kingi – of Auckland. For services to the community.
- Geoffrey William Fleetwood Thompson – of Waikanae. For services to politics.
- Carey William Adamson AFC – Chief of Air Staff, Royal New Zealand Air Force.
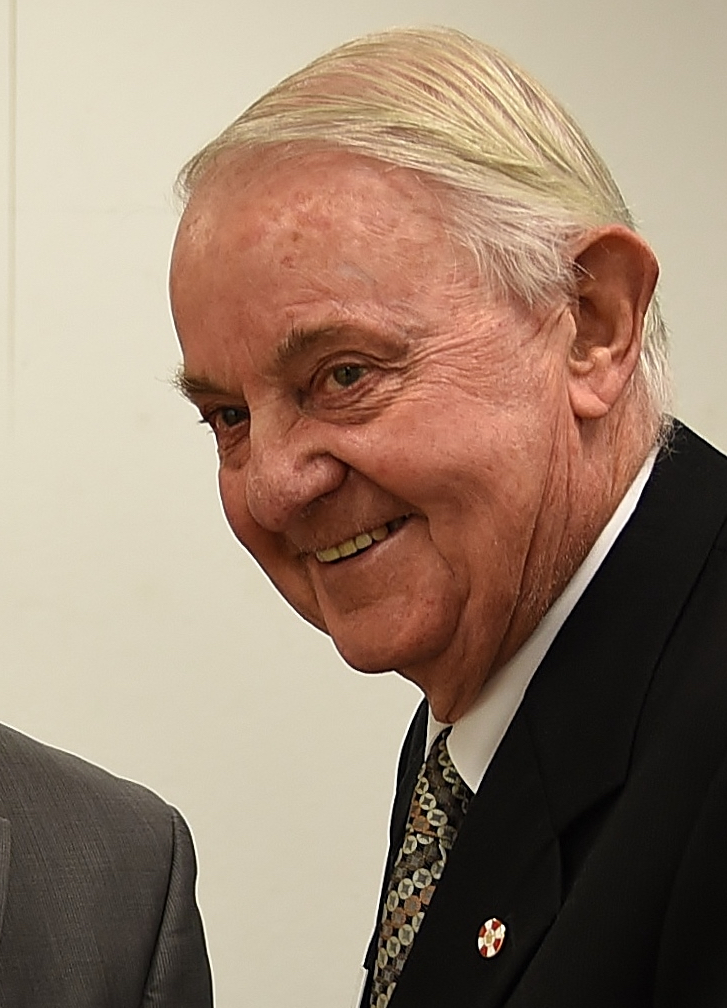
Bob Elliott

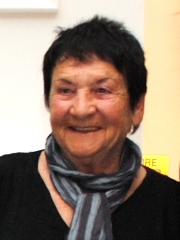
Marti Friedlander

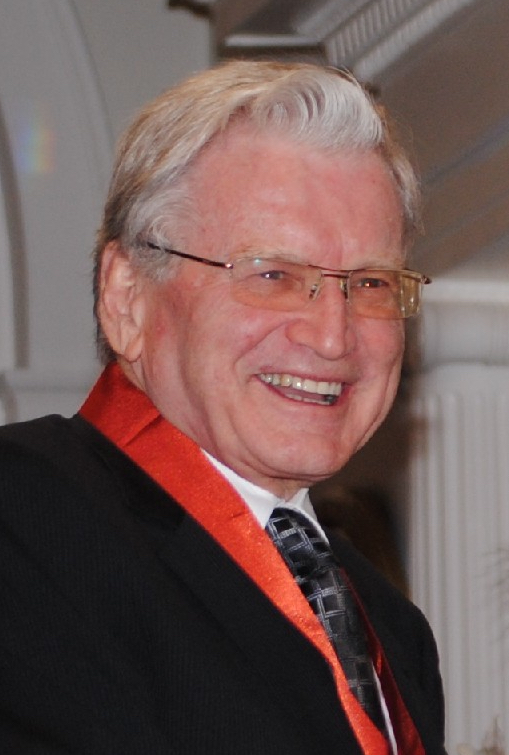
Bill Gallagher

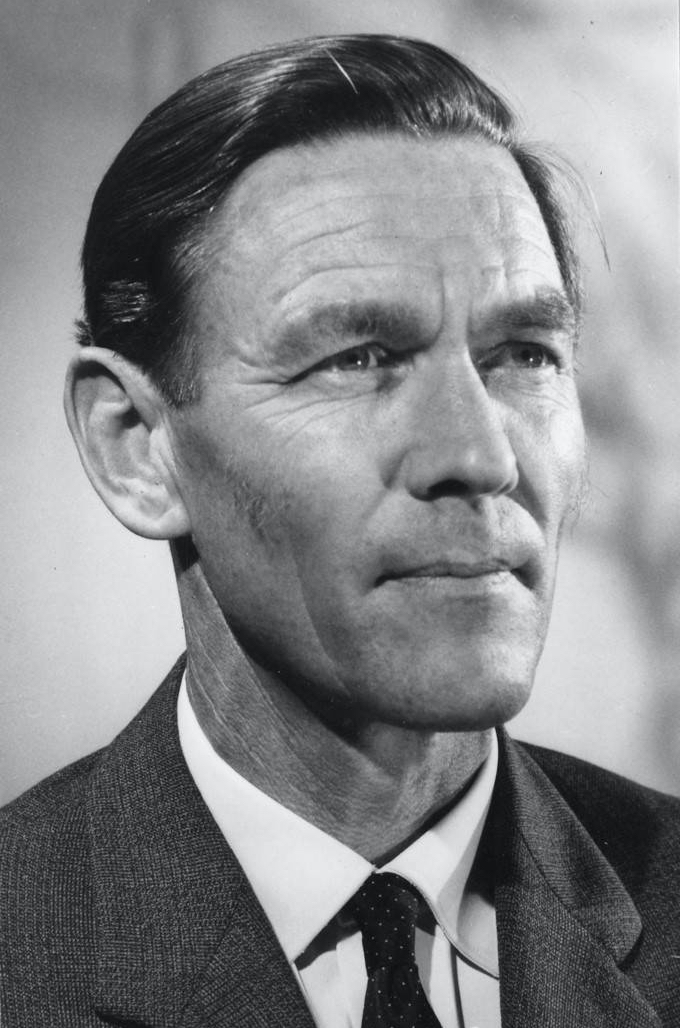
Jim Holdaway

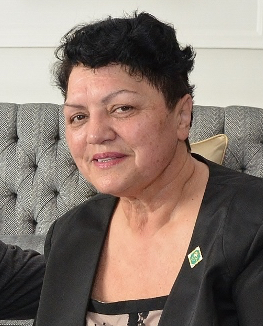
Pauline Kingi

=== Officer (ONZM) ===
- Margaret Hilda Alington – of Wellington. For services to local history.
- Peter Beadle – of Arrowtown. For services to painting.
- Colin Brokenshire JP – of Thames. For services to local-body and community affairs.
- John Law Fulton – of Dunedin. For services to roading and contracting industries.
- Elaine Gill – of New Plymouth. For services to tourism and the community.
- Frederick Robert Goodall ED – of Wellington. For services to sport.
- Karen Lesley Grylls – of Auckland. For services to choral music.
- Colin Leslie Knight – of Christchurch. For services to education.
- Molly Janette Mabee JP – of Auckland. For services to the community.
- Shirley Frances Whitley Maddock Easther (Shirley Maddock) – of Hamilton. For services to broadcasting.
- Margaret Isobel Maylor – of Auckland. For services to the community.
- Bryan William Mogridge – of Auckland. For services to the wine industry.
- Donald Clendon Peebles – of Christchurch. For services to art.
- Anaru Ririwai Rangiheuea JP – of Rotorua. For services to the Māori people and the community.
- Lancelot Miles Rive – of Auckland. For services to the Salvation Army and education.
- Don Charles Selwyn – of Auckland. For services to theatre, film and television.
- Eileen Smith – of Auckland. For service to the deaf.
- Norman Wallace Stevens – of Auckland. For services to the Auckland Youth Orchestra.
- Jillian Rae Williams – of Blenheim. For services to marching.
- John Roland Williams – of Wanganui. For services to manufacture and export.
- Colin Walter Wilson LVO – of Wellington; Assistant Commissioner of Police, New Zealand Police.
- Russell John Worth – of Wellington. For services to medicine and the community.
- Peter Francis Keith Usher – Royal New Zealand Navy.

Additional

- Jeremiah Mateparae – Colonels' List, New Zealand Army.
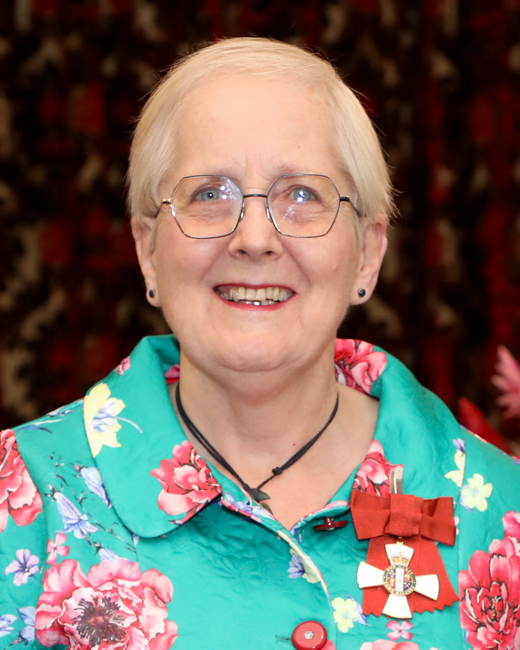
Karen Grylls

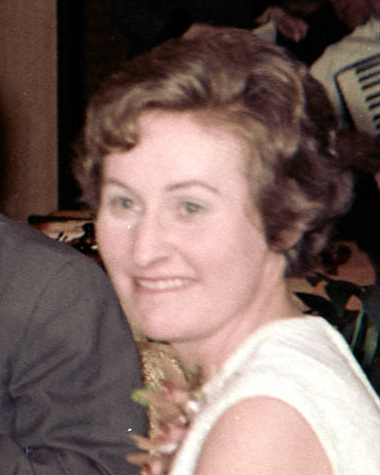
Shirley Maddock

Bryan Mogridge

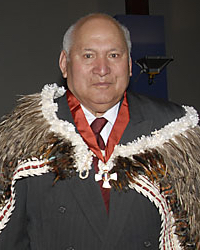
Anaru Rangiheuea

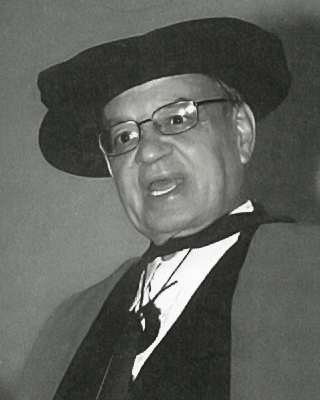
Don Selwyn

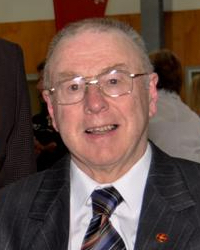
Russell Worth

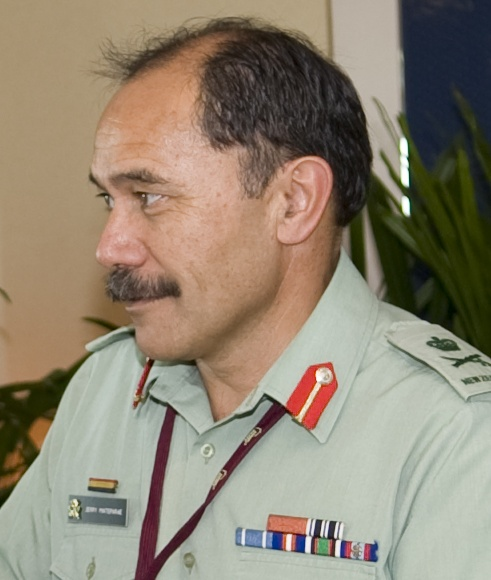
Jerry Mateparae

=== Member (MNZM) ===
- Percy James Anstiss – of Wellington. For services to the community.
- Frederick William Arnold JP – of Pukekohe. For services to farming and the community.
- Mabel Mary Baker – of Auckland. For services to the community.
- Ivan Ernest Billcliff – of Christchurch. For services to soccer.
- Peter Chan – of Auckland. For services to the Chinese community.
- Jane Ruby Karina Davis – of Riverton. For services to the community.
- Noel John Dunlop – of Queenstown. For services to the community.
- Ailsa Jean Eddie – of Pahiatua. For services to education and the community.
- David Joseph Flynn JP – of Featherston. For services to local-body and community affairs.
- Rachel Gillies – of Waiuku. For services to the community.
- Mary Grace Going – of Northland. For services to the community.
- Robert Miles Hamill – of Hamilton. For services to ocean rowing.
- James Henry Hayes – of Rotorua. For services to scouting and the community.
- Kevin James Hopkins – Royal New Zealand Air Force (Retired).
- Brendon Roy Kane – Royal New Zealand Navy.
- Pamela Margaret Highet – of Levin. For services to the disabled.
- Deborah Ann Hockley – of Christchurch. For services to cricket.
- Selwyn Ira (Bill) Katene – of Porirua. For services to the community.
- Theresa Elizabeth Keenan – of Hokitika. For services to the community.
- Tuhakia-Ihimaera Teepa (Sonny) Keepa – of Hastings. For services to the community.
- Jo-Anne Marie La Grouw – of Rotorua. For services to business and the community.
- Monica Marjorie Leggat – of Hamilton. For services to netball.
- Warren Alexander Lindberg – of Waitakere. For services to welfare work.
- Robert Featherston Little – Territorial Air Force.
- Kevin John McKenna – Royal New Zealand Air Force.
- Fraser Grant McKenzie JP – of Rotorua. For services to farming and the Port of Tauranga.
- Tupou Here Tamata Manapori – of Manukau City. For services to local-body and community affairs.
- Isobel Anne Mayman – of Timaru. For services to the community.
- Noel Allan Meek – of Greytown. For services to the community.
- Robert Narev – of Auckland. For services to the community.
- Hine Patokariki Rosina Paewai – of Carterton. For services to the Māori people.
- Stephen Kelly Petterson – of Auckland. For services to smallbore rifle shooting.
- Ruby Selby – of Christchurch. For services to nursing and the community.
- Philip Mark Stubbs – late of Auckland. For services to ocean rowing. (Note: Deceased 20 December 1998. Her Majesty's approval to this honour was signified before the date of decease.)
- Madeleine Sophie Tangohau JP – of Tolaga Bay. For services to the community.
- Makoare Kohupara Te Kani – Royal New Zealand Navy.
- The Reverend Morehu Te Whare – of Hamilton. For services to the community.
- Gordon Frederick Tietjens – of Tauranga. For services to rugby.
- Pane Puhipuhi Frances Ututaonga – of Paihia. For services to nursing and the community.
- Camille Rangihoea (Sandy) Walker – of Herbertville. For services to the community.
- Helen Jessie Webber – Royal New Zealand Air Force.
- Sheila Mary Weight JP – of Auckland. For services to the community.
- Gillian Karawe Whitehead – of Dunedin. For services to music.
- Mutu Wihongi – of Auckland. For service to the community.

Additional

- Janet Lois Castell – Royal New Zealand Corps of Signals.
- Gerald Peter Shirley – Corps of Royal New Zealand Engineers.
- Esther Jean Harrop – Royal New Zealand Army Logistic Regiment.
- Warren Stuart Nathan – Corps of Royal New Zealand Engineers.
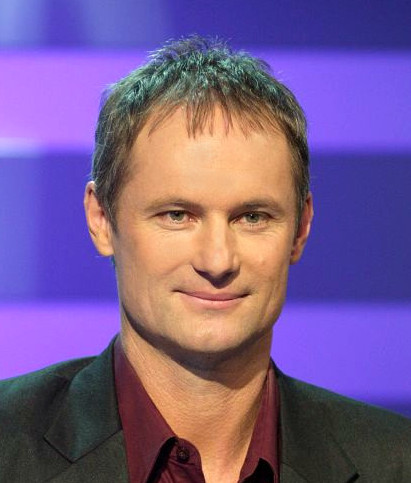
Rob Hamill

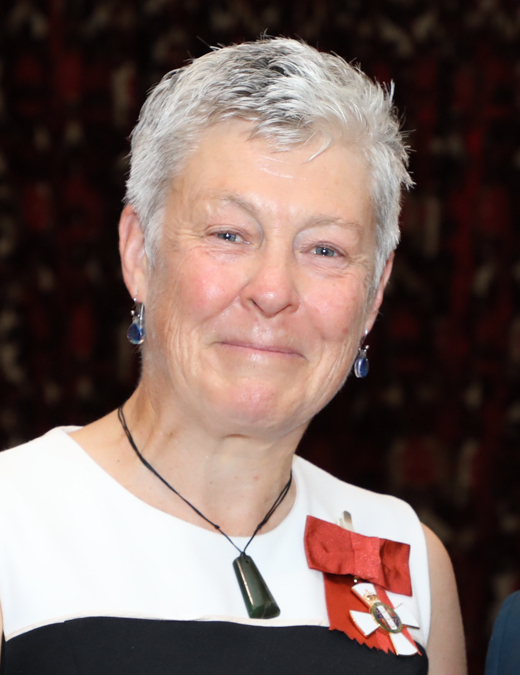
Debbie Hockley

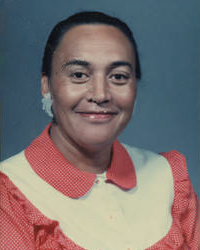
Tupou Manapori

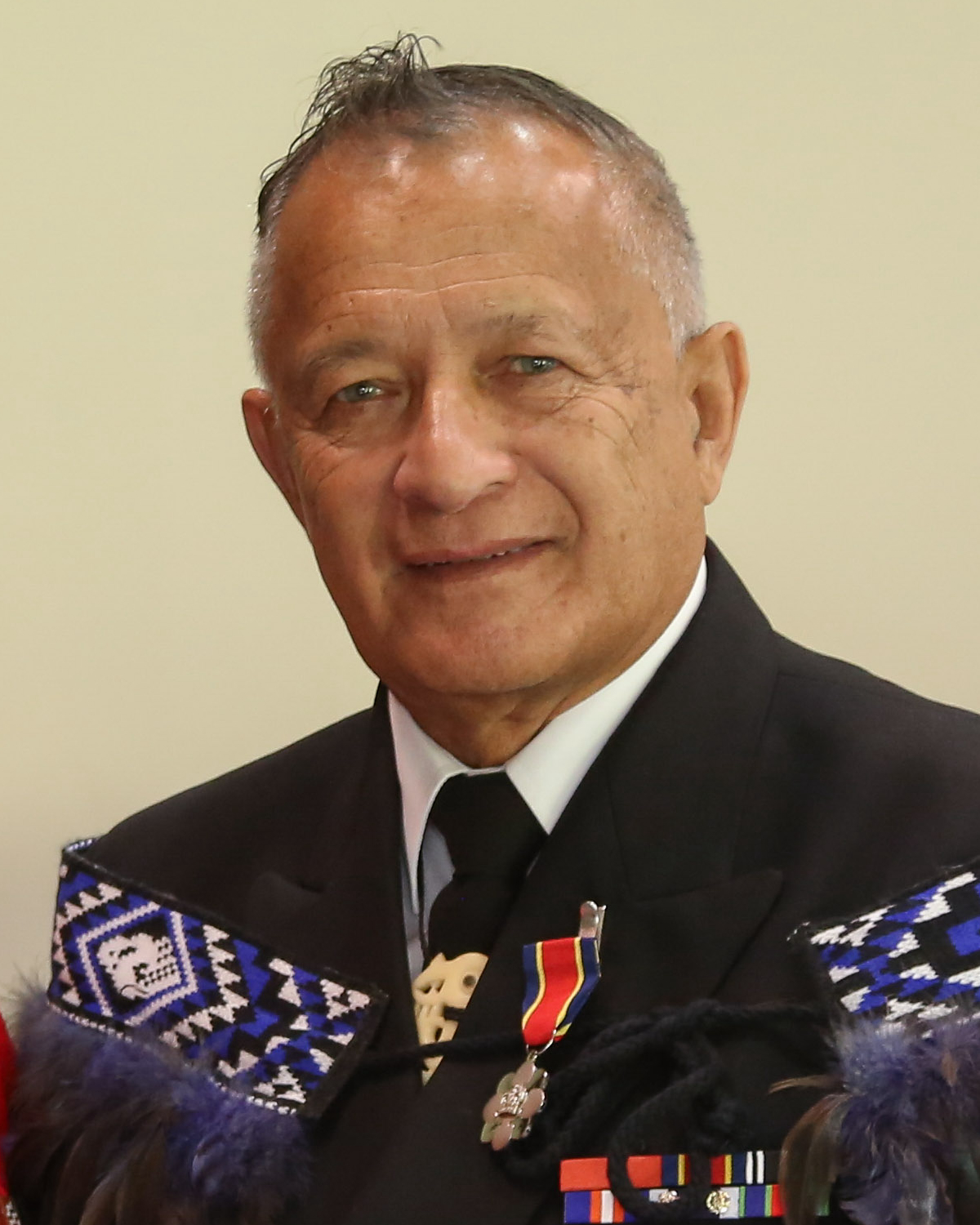
Mark Te Kani

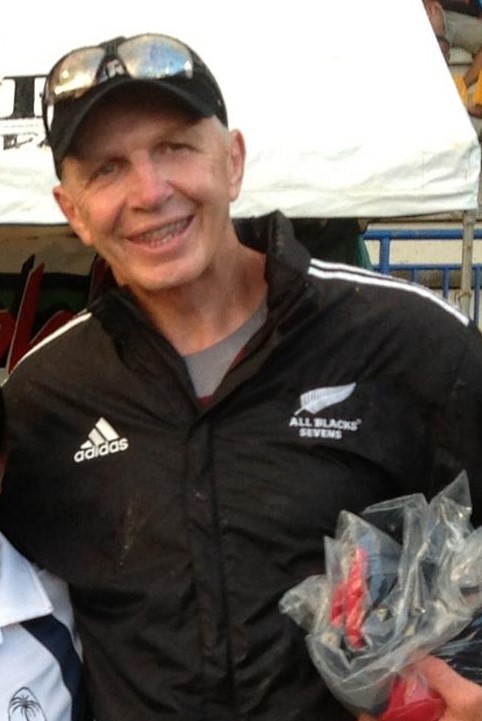
Gordon Tietjens

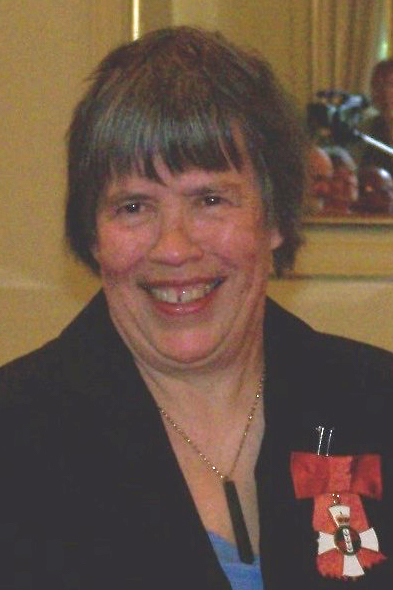
Gillian Whitehead

== Companion of the Queen's Service Order (QSO) ==
=== For community service ===
- Joan Scott Cumming – of Hamilton.
- Brian Hauauru Jones JP – of Taupō.
- William Douglas McElhinney – of Christchurch.
- Judith Anne Mills – of Napier.
- Alan Desmond Nixey – of Auckland.
- Denise Marion Nicolay Richardson – of Christchurch.
- Gordon Walter Marshall Strachan JP – of Raumati Beach.
- Lyall Graeme Thurston JP – of Rotorua.

=== For public services ===
- Janice Roberta Campbell – of Wellington.
- Jeremy Paul Dwyer JP – of Clive.
- Robert Fellowes GCB GCVO – Private Secretary to the Queen, London, United Kingdom.
- Leonard Keith Fyall – of Balclutha.
- Richard James Gerard – of Ottawa, Canada.
- John Plimsoll Godfrey – of Christchurch.
- Richard Barton Johnson JP – of Springfield.
- Richard Alexander White JP – of Gisborne.

== Queen's Service Medal (QSM) ==
=== For community service ===
- Queenie Amy Ballance – of Auckland.
- Joan Mary Bythell – of Blenheim.
- Margaret Carroll – of Ngāruawāhia.
- Eleanore Jean Clark – of Warkworth.
- Elizabeth Cooke – of Auckland.
- Kerewai Conrad – of Kaitaia.
- Jill Creamer JP – of Woodend.
- Rosabelle Irene Devadhar – of Hāwera.
- Walter Francis Elgar – of Marton.
- Lesley Elizabeth Exeter – of Christchurch.
- William Francis Falvey MBE – of Wellington.
- Anthony Russell Harris – of Auckland.
- Frances Mary Hunter JP – of Reefton.
- Elva May Jeffreys – of Christchurch.
- David William Jupp – of Wellington.
- Dorothy Isabel King – of Christchurch.
- Gavin Wareham Maclean – of Gisborne.
- Ian Roderick Matheson – of Palmerston North.
- Cecilia Brenda Monk – of Wellington.
- Doris Mary Robertson – of Mount Maunganui.
- Doreen Roil – of Hamilton.
- The Reverend Mase James Salesa – of Invercargill.
- Doris Maude Elizabeth Skinner – of Levin.
- Claude Alexander Stratford – of Te Puke.
- Mavis Stuart Tucker – of North Shore City.
- Mamatua Margaret Takaia Vaine Vahua-Matheson JP – of Rotorua.
- Jessie McLeod Walker – of Tauranga.
- Joseph Melvin Walker – of Tauranga.
- Nigel Wingent Werry JP – of Wellington.
- Margaret Joyce Wilson – of Tākaka.

=== For public services ===
- Heather Anne Adams JP – of Pauanui.
- Florence Rebecca Bain – of Oamaru.
- Walter James Baker JP – of Lincoln.
- Leslie William Brough – of Queenstown.
- Sheryl Ann Burns – of Auckland.
- Alexander John Raven Cooper – of Christchurch.
- Margaret Jane Cooper – of Auckland.
- Melville Barton Cromie – of Rotorua.
- Robert Clifford Dinsdale – of Whangārei.
- Roger Fowler – of Auckland.
- Shirley Mary Frater – of Motueka.
- Nicholas Lyon Gresson – of Auckland.
- Colin John Growcott – of Hokitika; chief fire officer, Hokitika Volunteer Fire Brigade.
- Frank Whanau-Pani Haami-Jones – of Darwin, Australia, formerly of Flaxmere.
- Tangimoe (Tangi) Haami-Jones – of Darwin, Australia, formerly of Flaxmere.
- Ian Stewart Harvey – of Gore.
- Lindsay Cyril Hazley – of Invercargill.
- Pauline Mary Hinds – of Christchurch.
- Matekino Lawless – of Rotorua.
- Shirley Maureen McDouall – of Wanganui.
- Calum Neil McGillivray – of Claris, Great Barrier Island.
- loria Hinemoa (Bonny) Manley – of Auckland.
- Guthrie Cyril Manley – of Auckland.
- Josephine Astbury Marr JP – of Whakatāne.
- Joseph William Murphy – of Taumarunui.
- Desmond Michael O'Sullivan – of Wellington; sergeant, New Zealand Police.
- Eileen Louise Parsons – of Maungaturoto.
- Henare Maki Pirihi – of Onerahi.
- Allen Thomas Procter – of Napier; fire region commander, Eastern Fire Region.
- David William Ross – of Wellington; senior constable, New Zealand Police.
- William Michel Rubinstein – of Nice, France.
- Roy Colin Sefton – of Palmerston North.
- Harry Shackleton – of Masterton; lately firefighter, Masterton Volunteer Fire Brigade.
- Trevor Colin Smith – of New Plymouth; senior constable, New Zealand Police.
- Jeffery William Whittaker – of Hastings.
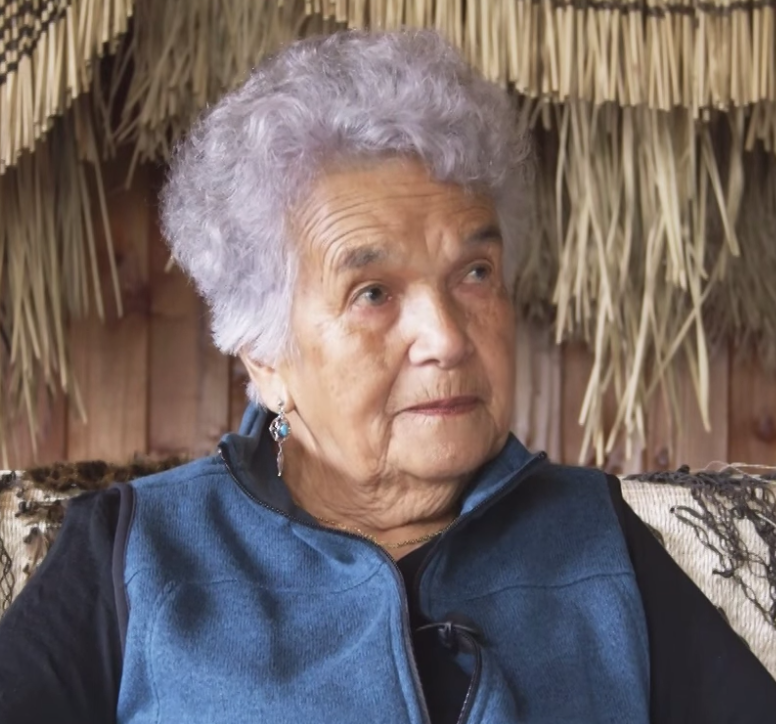
Matekino Lawless
