= Vernon Systems =

New Zealand software company

Vernon Systems Ltd
- Industry: Software for museums and galleries
- Founded: 1985
- Founder: Bil Vernon
- Headquarters: Auckland, New Zealand
- Number of locations: UK, South Africa, and NZ
- Products: Vernon CMS, eHive
- Website: vernonsystems.com

Vernon Systems Ltd (VSL) is a company that produces collections management software for museums, galleries, and other cultural heritage institutions. The company was established in 1985. It is based in Auckland, New Zealand, but sells its software internationally.

== Products ==
Vernon Systems has two major products, widely used by the museum community:

Vernon CMS

This is a Collections Management System for museums. It is a modular desktop package designed to manage all types of collections. The system has been compared with others in an independent study. The product has been studied by the University of Sydney and the Powerhouse Museum. It has also been studied with respect to interoperability of metadata. The software has been demonstrated at the American Association of Museums meetings. It has been used for a database of birds in Australian and New Zealand museums. The software can be used by small museums.

eHive

This is a simple-to-use web-based cataloguing and public access system. eHive includes integration with the WordPress content management system. eHive is free for low levels of use, with graded charges depending on usage. eHive is the foundation of the Kōtuia ngā Kete NZMuseums website (formerly called NZMuseums), a public website presenting New Zealand's museums and galleries and their collections online, presented at the Museums and the Web conference in 2009.

== Partnerships ==
VSL has partnered with museum organizations including Collections Trust in the United Kingdom. It has also participated in major international museum events such as the Museums and the Web conference and in the United Kingdom at the Museums + Heritage Show.
