= Auckland Institute and Museum =

Learned society in New Zealand

Auckland Museum Institute
- Coat of arms
- Formation: 6 November 1867; 158 years ago
- Founders: Frederick Hutton; Thomas Gillies
- Type: Learned Society
- Headquarters: Auckland Museum
- Location: Auckland, New Zealand
- Coordinates: 36°51′37.1″S 174°46′40.1″E
- Members: 721 (2025); 841 (2024); 1,098 (2023); 935 (2022); 1,731 (2009); 2040 (1986)
- Parent organisation: Royal Society of New Zealand
- Website: aucklandmuseum.com

Auckland Institute and Museum, known as Auckland Museum Institute since 1996 and the Royal Society of New Zealand Auckland Branch, is a learned society in New Zealand.

== History ==
Formed as the Auckland Philosophical Society on 6 November 1867, for "the promotion of art, science, and literature by means of a museum and library, lectures, and meetings of the members", with a view to incorporation with the newly created New Zealand Institute and adopting the Auckland Museum, the Society was fittingly renamed the Auckland Institute in March 1868 and formally incorporated with the New Zealand Institute on 10 June 1868.

In October 1869, upon the resolution of the Auckland Provincial Council, John Williamson, Superintendent of the Province of Auckland, transferred the 17-year-old Auckland Museum and its contents to the Auckland Institute, on the guarantee that the Institute "will adopt the proper measures (1) for the preservation of its present contents, (2) for a free admission of the public at convenient times." He also obtained a grant of the old Post Office site in Princes Street for the Institute. By 1871 the Institute was known as Auckland Institute and Museum; which first appeared on their annual reports in 1880–81.

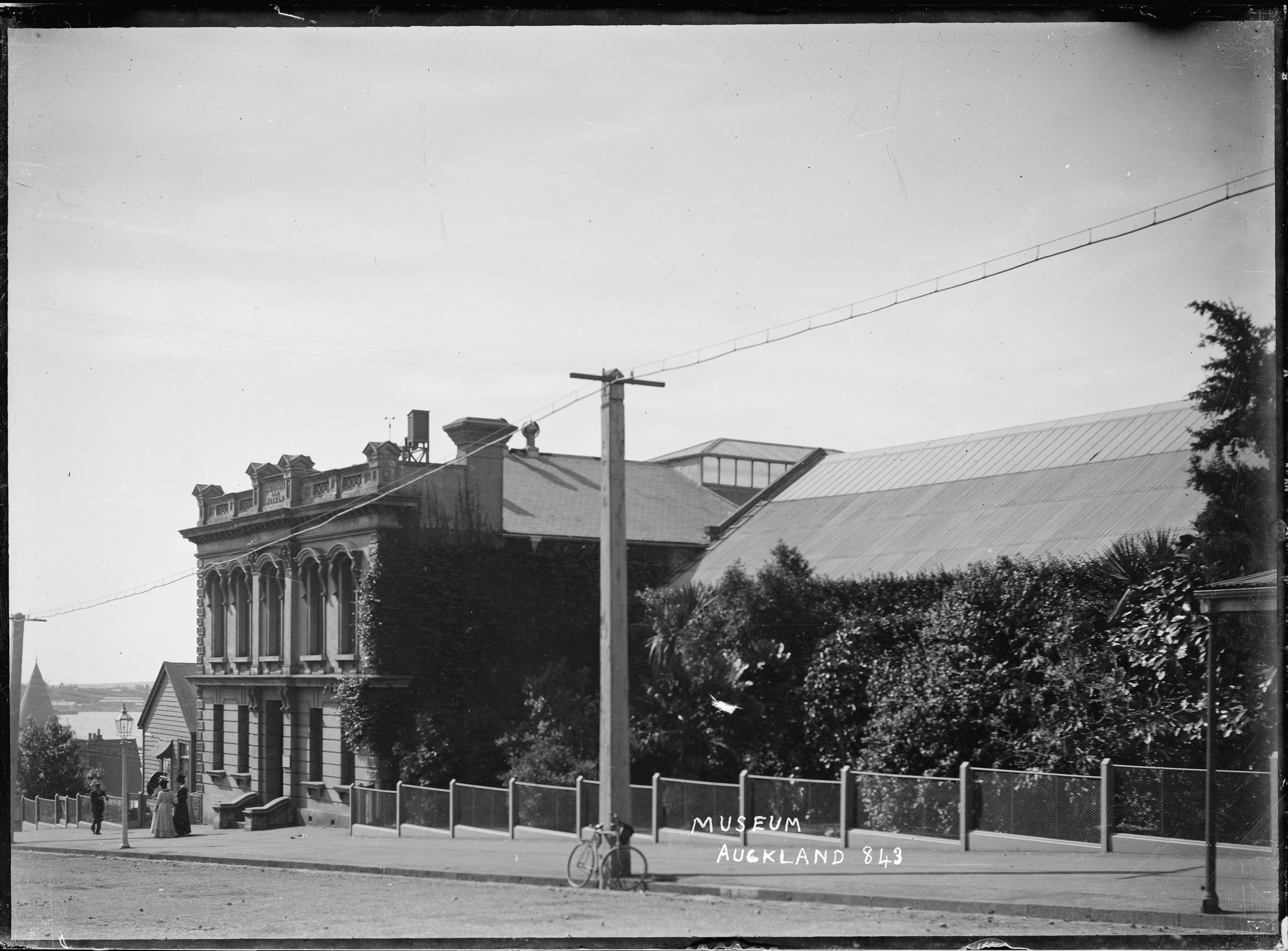
Auckland Institute and Museum, Princes Street, early 1900s, designed by Philip Herapath. Photo: William Archer Price

By the mid-1880s, Auckland Institute and Museum Council had felt for some time that the Institute's real property, held divided under different trustees, was unsatisfactory or unsecure. Discouraged by serious technical difficulties apparent in the idea of "incorporating" either the whole body of the Institute or the Institute's Council, as revealed through consultation and development with their solicitors, they formed the proposal to have the whole property held by one body of trustees, who would themselves be under the direction of the Institute's Council. Auckland Institute and Museum established their board of trustees, the Auckland Institute and Museum Trust Board, under the Religious, Charitable, and Educational Trust Boards Incorporation Act, 1884, managed by trustees appointed under the Auckland Museum Endowment Act, 1882, at a Special General Meeting in its Princes Street museum buildings on 5 October 1885.

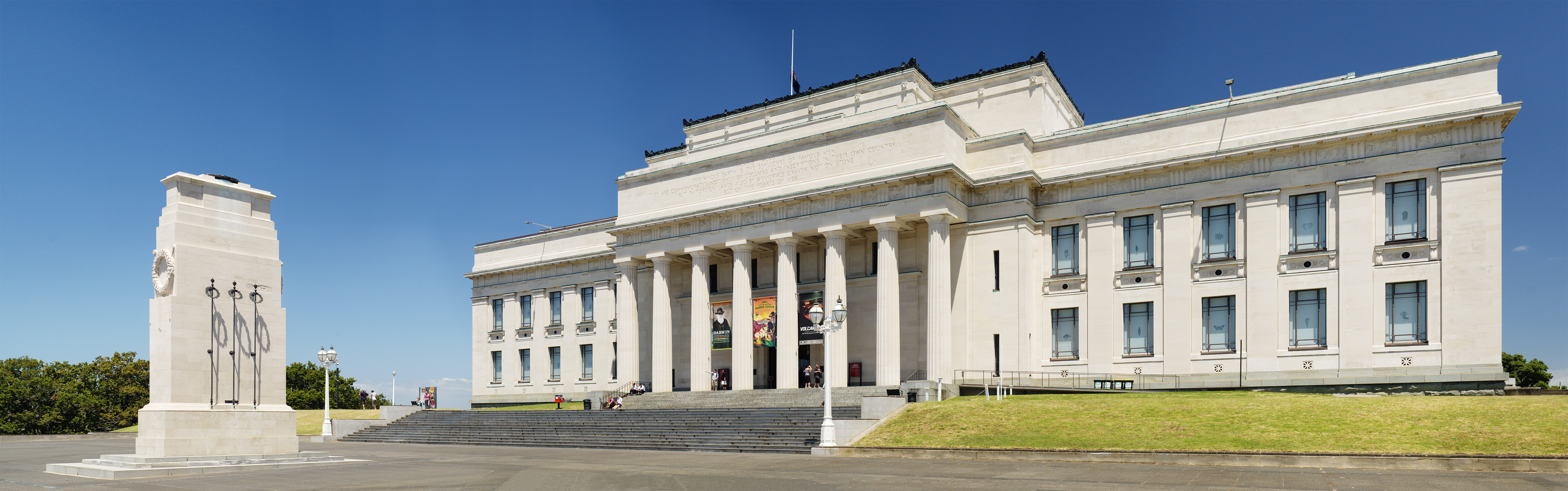
Auckland War Memorial Museum

In memory of the noble sacrifices made during the Great War, Auckland War Memorial Museum was opened to the public on 28 November 1929. In the opening address, the Chairman of the Citizens War Memorial Committee, Alfred Seymour Bankart, said to the Governor General, Sir Charles Fergusson:

Your Excellency, the Memorial takes two forms, the Museum building and the cenotaph, both embodying the same spirit. They are to be entrusted to the care of different bodies—the Court of Honour and Cenotaph to the Mayor and Councillors of the City of Auckland, and the Museum building to the trustees of the Auckland Institute and Museum.

Accordingly, Fergusson presented the Cenotaph to the Mayor of Auckland, George Baildon, accepting on behalf of the citizens, and the Auckland War Memorial Museum building to the President of the Auckland Institute and Museum, Hubert Earle Vaile.

In 1996 the Auckland War Memorial Museum Act 1996 separated the Institute from governance of the War Memorial Museum. Today the Auckland Museum Institute is charged with the support of the Museum and Museum Trust Board by providing advocacy, promoting the use and understanding of the Museum's collections and activities and supporting the function of the War Memorial aspect of the Museum. Since 1996, it has focused on its historic roles as 'Learned Society', operating Friends of the Auckland Museum, and appointing body for four Museum Trust Board members.

== Sections ==
The Institute's first independent special interest group, the Medical Section for the promotion of medical science, formed in 1869. The Anthropology and Maori Studies Section followed in 1922; Astronomical Section, Auckland Astronomical Society, in 1923–24; Conchology Section, Auckland Shell Club, in 1931; Maritime Section, Auckland Maritime Society, in 1958; and Costume & Textile Section, Costume and Textile Association of New Zealand, in 2002. Auckland Astronomical Society pursued the establishment of Stardome Observatory. Auckland Maritime Society pursued the establishment of the New Zealand Maritime Museum.

Current sections are:

- Conchology Section: Auckland Shell Club
- Costume & Textile Section: Costume and Textile Association of New Zealand

== Networks ==
Auckland Museum Institute is a partner in the Monuments Men and Women Museum Network, launched in 2021 by the Monuments Men Foundation for the Preservation of Art.

== Officers ==
=== Presidents ===
- 1867–1869: Frederick Whitaker
- 1869–1870: Thomas Bannatyne Gillies
- 1870–1871: Arthur Guyon Purchas
- 1871–1873: Theophilus Heale
- 1873–1874: Thomas Bannatyne Gillies
- 1874–1875: Sir George Alfred Arney
- 1875–1876: Josiah Clifton Firth
- 1876–1877: Thomas Bannatyne Gillies
- 1877–1878: Robert Clapham Barstow
- 1878–1879: Theophilus Heale
- 1879–1881: Arthur Guyon Purchas
- 1881–1882: Thomas Peacock
- 1882–1883: Edmund Augustus MacKechnie
- 1883–1884: William Garden Cowie
- 1884–1885: Hugh Garden Seth-Smith
- 1885–1886: James Alexander Pond
- 1886–1887: Frederick Douglas Brown
- 1887–1888: Algernon Phillips Withiel Thomas
- 1888–1889: Stephenson Percy Smith
- 1889–1890: Josiah Martin
- 1890–1891: James Stewart
- 1891–1893: Frederick Douglas Brown
- 1893–1894: Charles Alexander MacLean Pond
- 1894–1895: John Henry Upton
- 1895–1896: Algernon Phillips Withiel Thomas
- 1896–1897: Donald Petrie
- 1897–1898: Ernest Roberton
- 1898–1899: Henry Arnold Talbot-Tubbs
- 1899–1900: John Batger
- 1900–1901: Hugh William Segar
- 1901–1902: James Stewart
- 1902–1903: Ernest Roberton
- 1903–1906: Algernon Phillips Withiel Thomas
- 1906–1907: Frederick Douglas Brown
- 1907–1909: Ernest Valentine Miller
- 1909–1910: Charles William Egerton
- 1910–1911: Robert Briffault
- 1911–1912: John Henry Upton
- 1912–1913: Hugh William Segar
- 1913–1915: Christopher James Parr
- 1915–1917: Sir Edwin Mitchelson
- 1917–1926: Sir James Henry Gunson CMG CBE
- 1926–1931: Hubert Earle Vaile
- 1931–1933: Alfred George Lunn
- 1933–1934: Hugh William Segar
- 1934–1935: Sir Cecil Leys
- 1935–1936: Arthur Thomas Pycroft
- 1936–1938: Sir Carrick Hey Robertson
- 1938–1940: Charles Reginald Ford
- 1940–1941: William Aiken Fairclough
- 1942–1944: A. H. Johnstone
- 1944–1947: J. C. Rennie
- 1947–1949: Thomas Bloodworth
- 1949–1952: Francis Leveson-Gower West
- 1952–1955: Lindsay Heathcote Briggs
- 1955–1958: John William Kealy
- 1958–1961: J. H. Rose
- 1961–1964: John Seabrook
- 1964–1967: Stanley George Brooker
- 1967–1970: Harold Cecil Holland OBE
- 1970–1973: Arthur Robert Hughes
- 1973–1976: G. W. Frater
- 1976–1980: John Dunstan Atkinson OBE
- 1980–1983: Richard Henry Lindo Ferguson
- 1983–1986: R. E. Thomas
- 1986–1989: Sheila Weight
- 1989–1992: William Allan Laxon
- 1992–1995: Harold V. Coop
- 1995–1996: Alfred Richard Bellamy
- 1996–1998: Sheila Weight
- 1998–1999:
- 1999–2000:
- 2000–2001: Chris Patterson
- 2001–2002: Lawre Taylor
- 2002–2003: Arthur Haughey
- 2003–2008: Michael Rowe
- 2008–2012: Rae Nield
- 2012–2014: Roger Lins
- 2014–2020: John McIntyre
- 2020–2024: Roger Lins
- 2024–2025: Hamish McGhie

== Publications ==
- Transactions and Proceedings of the Royal Society of New Zealand, Wellington: New Zealand Institute / Royal Society of New Zealand – via PapersPast
- Records of the Auckland Institute and Museum, Auckland: Auckland Institute and Museum – via BHL
- Auckland Museum: Annual Reports, 1868–, Auckland: Auckland Institute / Auckland Institute and Museum / Auckland War Memorial Museum – via Internet Archive
- Archey, Gilbert (1937). South Sea Folk. Auckland Museum Handbook of Maori and Oceanic Ethnology. Auckland: Auckland War Memorial Museum.
- Archey, Gilbert (1941). "The Moa: A Study of the Dinornithiformes". Bulletin of the Auckland Institute and Museum. 1. Auckland: The Unity Press.
- Archey, Gilbert (1955). Sculpture and Design: An Outline of Maori Art. Handbook of Auckland War Memorial Museum. Auckland: Auckland Institute and Museum.
- Brooker, Stanley George; Cooper, Robert Cecil (1961). New Zealand Medicinal Plants. A Handbook of the Auckland War Memorial Museum. Auckland: The Unity Press.
- Cheeseman, Thomas Frederick (1917). The First Fifty Years of the Auckland Institute and Museum and its Future Aims: A Jubilee Sketch. Auckland: Auckland Institute and Museum.
- Cranwell, Lucy May; Green, Josiah E; Powell, Arthur William Baden (1943). Food is Where You Find It: A Guide to Emergency Foods of the Western Pacific. Auckland: Auckland Institute and Museum.
- Cranwell, Lucy May (1981). The Botany of Auckland: A Book for All Seasons. Auckland: Auckland Institute and Museum. ISBN 0908623003.
- Powell, Arthur William Baden (1947). Native Animals of New Zealand. Auckland Museum Handbook of Zoology. Auckland: The Unity Press.
- Powell, Arthur William Baden (1967). The Centennial History of the Auckland Institute and Museum. Auckland: Auckland Institute and Museum.
- Wingert, Paul S. (1952). Human Forms in the Art of Melanesia. Handbook of Auckland Institute and Museum. Vol. 4. Auckland: Auckland Institute and Museum.

== See also ==
- Royal Society of New Zealand
- Auckland War Memorial Museum
- Monuments Men Foundation for the Preservation of Art
