= Mick Pendergrast =

New Zealand curator, researcher and writer

- Born: Michael John Pendergrast; 1 July 1932; Pōkeno
- Died: 27 June 2010 (aged 77)
- Occupations: Curator, researcher, writer
- Employer: Auckland War Memorial Museum Tāmaki Paenga Hira
- Parents: Albert Gordon Pendergrast (father); Mary Pendergrast (mother)
- Awards: Associate Emeritus of Auckland War Memorial Museum, 2001 & 2002

Mick (Michael John) Pendergrast (1932–2010) was a New Zealand curator, researcher and writer known for his knowledge and experience in Māori fibre arts. The Pendergrast family are from Mangatāwhiri.

== Work and influence ==
=== Fibre arts ===
Pendergrast's research and written outcomes is focused on the fibre arts in Māori and Pacific cultures. According to Deborah Waite, in his essay "The Fibre Arts" within Maori Art and Culture, 2nd ed. speaks to his experience as a part time Ethnology assistant at Auckland Museum (1983-85/6) and Māori Court assistant. Pendergrast uses visual elements like diagrams and photographs alongside his written components of his essay to highlight how the taonga are made and worn in a traditional sense. Furthermore, he indicates that fibre based taonga, such as kakahu (cloaks) or kete (baskets) are mostly crafted by women. Adrienne L. Kaeppler of the Smithsonian Institution suggests that this work shows the scholar's dedication to insisting the physical and conceptual presence of taonga is one of continuum through past, present, and future.

Weaver Matthew McIntyre Wilson references Pendergrast's Feathers & Fibre: A Survey of Traditional and Contemporary Maori Craft 1984 in an interview on his practice. Wilson discusses how Pendergrast's emphasis on traditional techniques being present within contemporary practices is something he considers when generating ideas and bringing them to life. Additionally, Pendergrast recorded traditional patterns of the fibre arts through drawings, and this was later used by Wilson in fabric designs in Te Kooti Whenua Māori, the Māori Land Court in Whangārei. The idea for this space was actioned by GHD Woodhead Creative Spaces, led by Carin Wilson (Ngāti Awa) and Studio Pasifika, for the purpose of resolving the historical records of mass land loss for Māori.

As a VSA (Volunteer Service Abroad) teacher located in the Solomon Islands and Tikopia, and teacher in East Cape local groups, he learnt more about and taught plaiting as an artistic technique. This experience became a theme in his later research and publications.

=== Te Mahi Kete: Maori Basketry for Beginners (1986) ===
Te Mahi Kete highlights how New Zealand flax (phornium tenax) can be transformed into two different plaited kete. Specifically this publication details flax preparation, the weaving of patterns into kete, and other technical finishing tips for readers and makers.

=== Te Aho Tapu. The Sacred Thread (1987) ===
Te Aho Tapu hybridises the exhibition catalogue of "Te Aho Tapu" which showcased Māori clothing in Auckland Museum, and information about the art of cloak making and drawings by Pendergrast. The intended readers of the work are said to be a wide range. Cloak making is also emphasised as being done by Māori women and how they are taonga. To be a tool for teachers in their classrooms, other information and a specific study sheet were also created for Te Aho Tapu in the same year.

The Te Aho Tapu: The Sacred Thread exhibition ran from July 1987 to February 1988. The conceptual process of creating the exhibition involved Pendergrast who curated it, a Māori women's advisory including Te Aue Davis, Puti Rare, Hinemoa Harrison, Maureen Lander, Merimeri Penfold, and Toi Maihi, and a Māori weavers advisory who also did live examples of their art form to visitors. The physical process was carried out by Angus McKenzie who worked on the display cases, Paul O'Donnell, the electrician who dealt with lighting, and Geoffrey Logan, who live cast the sufficient amount of mannequins needs for the 60 cloaks. The final product was shown in the new Māori Gallery in the east section of the museum.

Visitors to the exhibition had a variety of ways to view the works, such as tours led by Pendergrast himself, and there was a private event held for people from the Waikare District. Visitation numbers increased during Te Aho Tapu with a dinosaur exhibit and Te Maori happening in a similar time period, but the sponsor, New Zealand Steel, helped the museum with advertisement of the book and exhibition. It was also recorded that as a result of this exhibition, a group of Māori weavers was created who would then organise collaborative gatherings at the museum as well as informally advising the Ethnology team there.

=== Fun with Flax: 50 Projects for Beginners (1987) ===
Fun with Flax has 50 different project options are presented with clear written and visual instructions, with a few examples including but not limited to: a dart, birds, puzzles, and fish.

== Publications ==
- Maori Basketry for Beginner. Te Mahi Kete: A Practical Guide for Craftworkers, Setting our the Preparation of Materials, and Weaving Techniques for Maori Baskets, Reed, 1975
- Feathers & Fibre: A Survey of Traditional and Contemporary Maori Craft, 1984
- Raranga Whakairo Maori Plaiting Patterns, 1984
- Te Mahi Kete: Maori Basketry for Beginners, Reed, 1986
  - 2nd ed. published 2000
- Fun with Flax: 50 Projects for Beginners, 1987
- Te Aho Tapu. The Sacred Thread, associated with the Auckland Institute and Museum, and New Zealand Steel Limited, 1987 (photographs by Brian Brake)
- Pacific Tapa, 1997
  - 2nd ed. Pacific Tapa, University of Hawai'i Press, 2004 (written with Roger Neich, photography by Krzysztof Pfeiffer)
- Traditional Tapa Textiles of the Pacific, Thames and Hudson, 1997, (written with Roger Neich, photography by Krzysztof Pfeiffer)
- Kakahu, Maori Cloaks, Bateman and Auckland Museum, 1997 (written with Maureen Lander, and Auckland Institute and Museum)
- Maori Art and Culture 2nd ed. (edited by D.C. Starzecka), 1998
  - 1st ed. 1996
- Tikopian Tattoo, 2000
- Tapa of the Pacific, Bateman and Auckland Museum, 2001 (written with Roger Neich, photography by Krzysztof Pfeiffer)
- Maori Fibre Techniques: A Resource Book for Maori Fibre Arts Ka Tahi Hei Tama Tu Tama, 2005
- Uhengaparaoa: Works by Tangimoe Clay: 27.05-21.06/2008, Objectspace, 2008 (written with Tangimoe Clay, and Objectspace)
- The Maori Collections of the British Museum, 2010
- Taonga Māori in the British Museum, Te Papa Press, 2010 (written with D.C. Starzecka, and Roger Neich)

== Quotes ==
- In Maori Art and Culture, discussing the te kaitaka (the cloak): "plain; their beauty derived from the perfection of the weaving and the glossy appearance of the soft, pliable fibre."
  - The Fearon Hay architects in collaboration with Auckland Airport's iwi relations manager Charles Berryman and daughter Taina used this quote to inspire the new, environmentally aware Te Kaitaka accommodation building located near Auckland Airport. The building's exterior design is reminiscent of korowai (a highly regarded type of Māori cloak) with its harakeke coloured mesh wrapping around the outside and swaying native plants atop the building.
