= Roger Neich =

New Zealand academic

Dr Roger Neich (Prof.)
- Born: 28 February 1944; Petone, New Zealand
- Died: 27 September 2010 (aged 66)
- Education: Hutt Valley High School, Victoria University of Wellington (Anthropology), University of California, Berkeley
- Occupations: Distinguished Professor of Anthropology University of Auckland Curator of Ethnology Auckland Museum (1986-2009), ethnologist [National Museum of New Zealand Te Papa Tongarewa (1969-86)], anthropologist, geologist
- Spouse: Leaoa Limasene Neich
- Children: Kay Neich
- Parents: Augustus Hugh Neich (father); Elizabeth Kathleen Neich (mother)
- Awards: Fellow of Auckland War Memorial Museum 2012, Polynesian Society's Elsdon Best Memorial Medal

Roger Neich was a New Zealand academic whose role within museums and galleries included ethnology, anthropology, curation, internal and external research. His experience and influence spanned the following institutions: Auckland War Memorial Museum, the University of Auckland, National Museum of New Zealand, University of California, Berkeley, and the British Museum.

== Work ==
His work as a curator and ethnologist contributed to the fields of Pacific and New Zealand art history and history. The improvements and alterations to the displayed collections of Māori and Pacific taonga for Auckland Museum were led by Neich, resulting in Indigenous voices being emphasised in that museum space. His role at Auckland Museum involved searching for new collection items and managing storage for collections both digitally and physically. His work within Auckland was further recognised when he became personal chair of the University of Auckland Anthropology Department in 2000.

Additionally, Neich was a member of Polynesian Society Council and wrote many pieces for their journal, the Journal of the Polynesian Society. Within anthropology Neich's work on Pacific culture in Western Samoa and Papua New Guinea is marked significant by Auckland Art Gallery for its impact in the field. As a researcher he also spent his time travelling and attending auctions. Neich retired in 2009 for health-related reasons, passing the following year.

Upon his passing a tribute to Neich was written by contributors to the Journal of the Polynesian Society including Geoffrey Irwin, Alan Jones, and Jeffrey Sissons. It was published as a 441 page collection inclusive of 18 of his own essays that he had arranged to be included prior to his death, over 200 illustrations and various bibliographies and indexes including one detailing all of Neich's publications. The piece was edited by colleagues of his at Auckland Museum including Chanel Clarke, Fuli Pereira, and Nigel Prickett, and then published on behalf of the museum by Bridget Williams Books. After being published and first presented in December 2013 at the museum, his wide scope of research into Pacific and Māori art became apparent with its "topics ranging from Ruatahuna wood-carvings to gateways of Maketu and treasures boxes, and seven Pacific items on Samoa, Papua New Guinea and the Solomon Islands."

=== Education ===
Neich worked as a geologist for the Australian Bureau of Mineral Resources in Port Moresby for a period in the mid 1960s with his foundation of a Bachelor of Science in Geology and Zoology. This experience begun his interest in the intersections of canoes, cultural dress and language.

Whilst he was known for his writing on Pacific and Māori taonga he also wrote about Greek, Roman, Indian and Buddhist art under the advisement of his PhD mentor Nelson Graburn. The range of art research he partook in is appreciated by a former colleague Fulimalo Pereira of Auckland Institute and Museum, who wrote "He was equally moved by old whare nui and Buddhist temples as he was by Banks Island nalot pounders and Aboriginal flaked glass arrowheads." Graburn, an anthropologist himself, participated in research on folk art and Bill Holm's ideas on Northwest Coast Indian art forms. The similarities in form from Northwest Coast Indian art forms were then drawn back to Pacific art and aligned themselves with Neich's work. Being present in and engaged with First Nations spaces and events were key to his journey as a PhD student at University of California, Berkeley.

=== Pacific Arts Association (PAA) Conference, 2005 ===
The Pacific Arts Association began in 1974 but only became an association in 1978. The goal of their organisation has been to discuss Pacific art in a global context inclusive of all arts fields across Oceania, as well as establishing and maintaining scholarly relationships through their communicative pathway. PAA have a journal entitled Pacific Arts that has published annual issues since 2006, but officially began in 1990. The journal also increased online accessibility in 2020 by distributing content to eScholarship platforms - Alongside written scholarship they hold their international symposia every three years for scholars and those interested in the field to attend.

Neich was a keynote speaker at the July 2005 PAA Conference that took place in Salem. The conference's theme that year was "Pacific Diasporas: People, Art, and Ideas on the Move." He spoke with his knowledge and experience in the field of Pacific Studies and notably highlighted to the audience the gaps of understanding between early twentieth-century collectors and contemporary academics. Scholar Christian Kaufmann wrote the following in response to the presentation: "He was convinced that while it is our duty to conserve the material remains as witnesses to the past, we are also bound to keep our eyes open in regards to their on-going symbolic significance to modern Pacific peoples, as well as the inherent dynamics between these two approaches."

At the conclusion of the conference Neich was gifted the Manu Daula, otherwise known as the Frigate Bird Award, as a result of his dedication to his career.

=== Painted Histories: Early Māori Figurative Painting (1993) ===
In Painted Histories Neich centres the less traditional processes and designs seen in the figurative paintings of late nineteenth-century Māori meeting houses. Within his discussion on the process and designs featured in over 80 of these houses, the art form is talked about and not just as it was originally intended, as a reaction to missionaries' thoughts on interior design choices of Māori churches.

=== Maori Art and Culture (1996) ===
Neich's section with Maori Art and Culture, 1996, is notable for its details on wood-carving. He mentions one of the tribal origin stories of carving involves the story of Ruatepupuke and his son Te Manuhauturuki. The oral history consists of a journey Rua underwent to free his son from the Tangaroa's house down in the ocean, where along the way he discovers the ability for the interior carvings to speak, while many exterior posts did not. Upon setting the house alight from the porch area, it is said that many of Tangaroa's children did not survive the blaze, but many posts, even those unable to speak, were transported elsewhere.

The material process of wood carving also appear in Neich's work. For instance, the choice of tree used is dependent on the desired outcome. He writes that kauri are commonly found in Northern forests, and alongside tōtara is best suited to pieces with fine surface decoration due to its straight, fine grain. Neich details the finishing process of carvings, with them either being left unadorned, or painted with earth pigments like kokowai (typically red with wood carving) or charcoal mixed with shark-liver oil when symbolising a higher rank.

=== Carved Histories: Rotorua Ngāti Tarawhai Woodcarving (2001) ===
This publication accompanied his earlier Painted Histories and focuses on Ngāti Tarawhai carving techniques and outcomes throughout history up until today (as of 2001). Whilst the book details all recognised Ngāti Tarawhai carvings, contains maps, black and white and colour images, and information on whakapapa, the reader is also introduced to the prominent figures and makers behind the pieces as well as the social histories that the works embody.

== Publications ==
- Material Culture of Western Samoa, 1985
- Painted Histories: Early Māori Figurative Painting, Auckland University Press, 1993
- Māori Art and Culture, 1996
- Pacific Tapa, 1997
- Traditional Tapa Textiles of the Pacific, 1997
- Pounamu - Maori Jade of New Zealand, 1997
- Carved Histories: Rotorua Ngāti Tarawhai Woodcarving, Auckland University Press, 2001
- Pacific Jewellery and Adornment (written with Pandora Fulimalo Pereira), 2004
- The Oldman Collection of Pacific Artifacts, 2004
- Pacific Voyaging After the Exploration Period in Vaka Moana - Voyages of the Ancestors, 2006
- The Maori Collections of the British Museum (written with D.C. Starzecka and Mick Pendergrast), 2010
