= Marti Anderson (statistician) =

New Zealand statistician

Marti J. Anderson
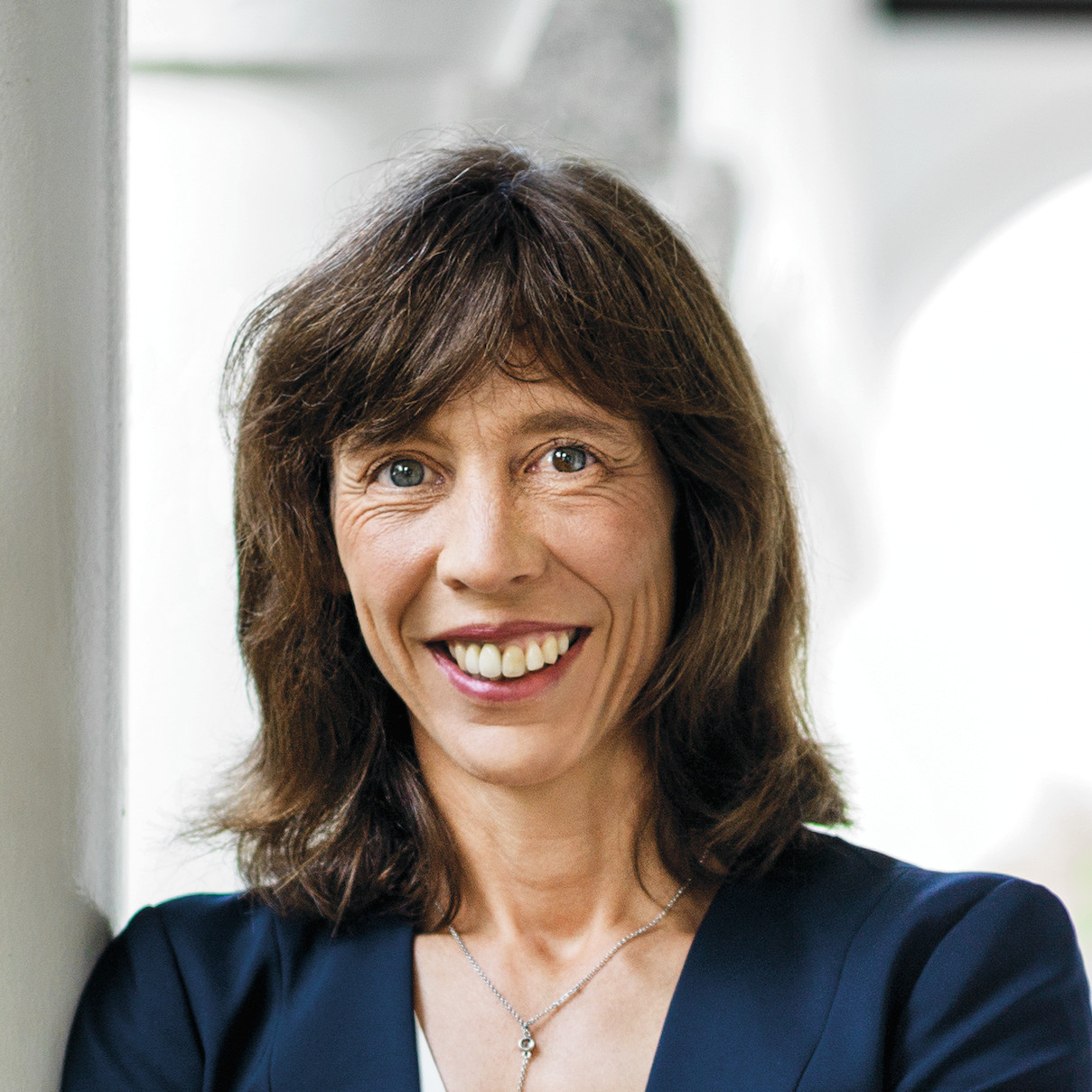
- Marti Anderson (2018)
- Born: Tacoma, Washington, USA
- Education: Occidental College, University of Sydney
- Scientific career
- Workplaces: University of Sydney, University of Auckland, Massey University, Director, PRIMER-e (Quest Research Limited)
- Thesis: Tests of ecological hypotheses in intertidal estuarine assemblages (1996)

Marti J. Anderson is an American researcher based in New Zealand. Her ecological statistical works is interdisciplinary, ranging from marine biology and ecology to mathematical and applied statistics. Her core areas of research and expertise are: community ecology, biodiversity, multivariate analysis, resampling methods, experimental designs, and statistical models of species abundances. She is a Distinguished Professor in the New Zealand Institute for Advanced Study at Massey University and also the Director of the New Zealand research and software-development company, PRIMER-e (Quest Research Limited).

== Academic career ==
Marti J. Anderson completed a Bachelor of Arts (BA) in Biology at Occidental College in 1991, advised by Dr Gary Martin. She then pursued a Graduate Diploma of Science (Honours) in Zoology at the University of Sydney in Australia, going on to complete a PhD in Marine Ecology supervised by Professor Antony Underwood (completed in 1997). Following this, she was awarded a U2000 Postdoctoral Fellowship to continue her work in marine science as part of the Centre for Ecological Impacts of Coastal Cities at the University of Sydney. During this time, she also completed a Master of Arts (MA) in Mathematical Statistics supervised by Professor John Robinson (completed in 1999).

In 1999, she began a full-time academic position as Lecturer in the Department of Statistics at the University of Auckland, rising to Associate Professor in 2007. She was appointed to a Professorial Chair in Statistics at the Institute for Information and Mathematical Sciences (IIMS) at Massey University's Albany campus in 2009. She was the first woman to be appointed to a full-time Professorial position in New Zealand in any of the fields of Mathematics, Statistics or Computer Science.

She became a member of the Professoriate in the New Zealand Institute for Advanced Study (NZIAS) in 2011, and soon thereafter (2013), she was elected a Fellow of the Royal Society of New Zealand. In 2015 she was awarded a James Cook Research Fellowship for work on multivariate statistical models of ecological communities. She was awarded the title of Distinguished Professor by Massey University in 2018.

Marti J. Anderson is also the sole Director of the New Zealand research and software-development company PRIMER-e (Quest Research Limited).

== Selected works ==
- Anderson, Marti Jane (2001). "A new method for non-parametric multivariate analysis of variance" (PDF). Austral Ecology. 26 (1): 32–46. doi:10.1111/j.1442-9993.2001.01070.pp.x. Wikidata Q119071246.
- Smith, Adam Nicholas Howard; Anderson, Marti Jane; Pawley, Matthew (2017). "Could ecologists be more random? Straightforward alternatives to haphazard spatial sampling". Ecography. 40 (11): 1251–1255. doi:10.1111/ecog.02821. Wikidata Q118134504.
- Anderson, Marti, Ray N. Gorley, and Robert K. Clarke. Permanova+ for Primer: Guide to Software and Statistical Methods. Primer-E Limited, 2008.
- McArdle, Brian H.; Anderson, Marti Jane (2001). "FITTING MULTIVARIATE MODELS TO COMMUNITY DATA: A COMMENT ON DISTANCE-BASED REDUNDANCY ANALYSIS" (PDF). Ecology. 82 (1): 290–297. doi:10.1890/0012-9658(2001)082[0290:fmmtcd]2.0.co;2. Wikidata Q104204719.
- Anderson, Marti Jane; Willis, Trevor (2003). "CANONICAL ANALYSIS OF PRINCIPAL COORDINATES: A USEFUL METHOD OF CONSTRAINED ORDINATION FOR ECOLOGY" (PDF). Ecology. 84 (2): 511–525. doi:10.1890/0012-9658(2003)084[0511:caopca]2.0.co;2. Wikidata Q119072077.
- Legendre, Pierre; Anderson, Marti Jane (1999). "DISTANCE-BASED REDUNDANCY ANALYSIS: TESTING MULTISPECIES RESPONSES IN MULTIFACTORIAL ECOLOGICAL EXPERIMENTS" (PDF). Ecological Monographs. 69 (1): 1–24. doi:10.1890/0012-9615(1999)069[0001:dbratm]2.0.co;2. Wikidata Q58193024.
