= Margaret S. Morley =

New Zealand malacologist and museum curator

- Born: 1938; New Zealand
- Died: September 2016 (aged 77–78); New Zealand
- Other names: M. S. Morley, Margaret Stewart Keer
- Occupation(s): Malacologist, illustrator, museum curator
- Years active: 1980–2016
- Awards: Associate Emeritus of Auckland War Memorial Museum

Margaret S. Morley (née Keer, 1938–2016), was a New Zealand malacologist, illustrator and museum curator. A self-trained researcher, Morley joined the Auckland Shell Club in 1980 and became one of the leading experts in the identification of New Zealand micromollusc species. A prolific researcher, Morley published over 119 papers, most of which featured her own illustrations, and in 2004 published A Photographic Guide to Seashells of New Zealand.

== Biography ==
Margaret Stewart Keer was born in 1938. Morley studied physiotherapy and trained as an orthopaedic nurse. By chance became interested in marine life while volunteering with Girl Guides, after seeing a mycology display at the Auckland Easter Show. She joined the Auckland Shell Club in the late 1970s, when her children were young. In 1992 she became one of founding members of the Auckland Geology Club. Morley was a self-taught researcher, first publishing research papers in 1980. In 1993, Morley was made an Honorary Research Associate of Auckland Museum, volunteering as a research associate for over 30 years. Over this time, Morley became one of the leading experts in New Zealand micromollusc identification, and would spend at least one day per week making shoreline observations. In 1995, Morley donated a large number algae specimens for the herbarium at Auckland Museum.

In 2004, Morley published the book A Photographic Guide to Seashells of New Zealand. In 2006, Morley published the first study of New Zealand ostracod distribution ever undertaken.

In 2014, Morley became an Associate Emeritus of Auckland War Memorial Museum, due to her work in advancing the museum's marine collections, developing the museum's exhibitions and delivering public programmes.

Morley died on 12 September 2016. Of the 119 research papers Morley wrote, most included her own illustrations. She published works on marine molluscs, marine biology, geology and nudibranchs, and worked on research showing how introduced south-east Asian bivalve species had begun to dominate intertidal life in New Zealand. In July 2016 prior to her death, Morley donated her personal shell collection to the Auckland Museum, containing approximately 7,000 specimens.

== Personal live ==
Morley lived in Sunnyhills near Pakuranga, Auckland, close to the Tāmaki River. She was a committee member of the Tamaki Estuary Protection Society, the former director of the New Zealand College of Massage, and a commissioner for Girl Guides New Zealand.

== Selected works ==
- Morley, Margaret S; Hayward, Bruce W; Stephenson, A Brett; Smith, Nancy; Riley, Jenny L (1997). "Molluscs, crustacea and echinoderms from Kawhia, west coast, North Island". Tane. 36: 157–180.
- Morley, Margaret S.; Hayward, Bruce W. (1999). "Inner Shelf Mollusca of the Bay of Islands, New Zealand, and Their Depth Distribution". Papahou: Records of the Auckland Museum. 36: 119–140. ISSN 1174-9202. JSTOR 42905840. Wikidata Q58623318.
- Hayward, Bruce W; Morley, Margaret S; Stephenson, A Brett; Blom, Wilma M; Grenfell, Hugh R; Prasad, Ramola; Rogan, Doug; Thompson, Fiona; Cheetham, Julianne; Webb, Maggie (1999). "Intertidal and subtidal biota and habitats of the central Waitemata Harbour". Auckland Regional Council Technical Publication. 127: 40.
- Hayward, Bruce W.; Morley, Margaret S.; Hayward, Jessica J.; Stephenson, A. Brett; Blom, Wilma M.; Hayward, Kathryn A.; Grenfell, Hugh R. (1999). "Monitoring Studies of the Benthic Ecology of Waitemata Harbour, New Zealand". Papahou: Records of the Auckland Museum. 36: 95–117. ISSN 1174-9202. JSTOR 42905839. Wikidata Q58623317.
- Morley, Margaret S; Hayward, Bruce W; White, Arthur (2001). "Changes to the intertidal biota 1950's-2000 at Howick Beach, Auckland". Poirieria. 27: 4–19.
- Margaret Morley (2004). A Photographic Guide to Seashells of New Zealand. Illustrator: Iain A Anderson. New Holland Publishers. ISBN 978-1-86966-044-4. OCLC 56646921. Wikidata Q115391200.
- Morley, Margaret S.; Hayward, Bruce W. (2007). "Intertidal and Shallow-water Ostracoda of the Waitemata Harbour, New Zealand". Papahou: Records of the Auckland Museum. 44: 17–32. ISSN 1174-9202. JSTOR 42905892. Wikidata Q58623357.
- Hayward, Bruce W.; Morley, Margaret S.; Sabaa, Ashwaq T.; Grenfell, Hugh R.; Daymond-King, Rhiannon; Molloy, Catherine; Shane, Phil A.; Augustinus, Paul A. (2008). "Fossil Record of the Post-Glacial Marine Breaching of Auckland's Volcanic Maar Craters". Papahou: Records of the Auckland Museum. 45: 73–99. ISSN 1174-9202. JSTOR 42905900. Wikidata Q58623363.
- Krug, Patrick J; Morley, Margaret S; Asif, Jamal; Hellyar, Lynette L; Blom, Wilma M (2008). "Molecular confirmation of species status for the rare cephalaspidean Melanochlamys lorrainae (Rudman, 1968), and comparison with its sister species M. cylindrica Cheeseman, 1881". Journal of Molluscan Studies. 74 (3): 267–276. doi:10.1093/mollus/eyn018. ISSN 0260-1230.
- Morley, Margaret S.; Hayward, Bruce W. (2015). "Intertidal records of 'sea slugs' (nudibranchs and allied opisthobranch gastropods) from northern North Island, New Zealand". Papahou: Records of the Auckland Museum. 50: 33–75. ISSN 1174-9202. JSTOR 90014735. Wikidata Q58628991.
