= James Alexander Pond =

Analytical chemist, homoeopathic pharmacist

James Alexander Pond (1846–1941) was a New Zealand analytical chemist and homeopathic pharmacist.

== Life ==
He was born in London, England, on 27 September 1846. He is the son of Frances Sophia Beacon.
