= Dewhurst =

Dewhurst can refer to:

== People ==
- Christopher John ("Jack") Dewhurst (1920–2006), British gynecologist
- Colleen Dewhurst (1924–1991), Canadian-born actress
- David Dewhurst (born 1945), American politician
- Dorothy Dewhurst (1886–1959), English stage and film actress
- Edward Dewhurst (1870–1941), Australian tennis player
- Fred Dewhurst (1863–1895), Preston North End and England international footballer
- Frederick Arthur Dewhurst (1911–1985), Canadian politician
- George Dewhurst (disambiguation)
  - George Dewhurst (director), British actor, screenwriter and film director
  - George Dewhurst (cricketer), Trinidadian cricketer
- Gerard Dewhurst (1872–1956), English cotton merchant, banker and amateur footballer.
- Ian Dewhurst (born 1990), Australian hurdler
- Jack Dewhurst (1876–1924), English footballer with Blackburn Rovers and Bury
- Keith Dewhurst (1931–2025), English playwright and film and television scriptwriter
- Richard Dewhurst (1826–1895), American politician, member of the Wisconsin State Assembly
- Rob Dewhurst (born 1971), English football defender
- Robert Dewhurst (1851–1924), English cricketer
- Wynford Dewhurst (1864–1941), British artist and writer

== Places ==
- Dewhurst, Clark County, Wisconsin
- Dewhurst, Victoria Australia

== Other uses ==
- Dewhurst Butchers, a former subsidiary and brand name of Vestey Holdings
- Dewhurst Stakes, flat race ran at Newmarket in England for juveniles over 7 furlongs.
- Corporal Oliver Dewhurst (alias Foggy), a character in Last of the Summer Wine
