= Youmans =

Youmans is a surname of English origin, a variant of "yeoman". Notable persons with this last name include:

- Ashley Youmans, birth-name of Ashley Alexandra Dupré, call girl connected to the Eliot Spitzer prostitution scandal
- Charlotte Youmans, New Zealand painter
- Clarion A. Youmans, American politician
- Edward L. Youmans, American science writer, founder of Popular Science magazine; brother of Eliza Ann Youmans
- Eleanor Youmans, American children's author
- Eliza Ann Youmans, American science writer, sister of Edward L. Youmans
- Floyd Youmans, American baseball player
- Frank A. Youmans, American judge
- Heather Youmans, American singer-songwriter, voice actor, and journalist
- Henry M. Youmans, American politician
- Laurel E. Youmans, American politician and physician
- LeRoy Franklin Youmans, American politician
- Letitia Youmans, Canadian temperance advocate and WCTU organizer
- Marly Youmans, American author and poet
- Maury Youmans, American football player
- Phillip Youmans, American filmmaker
- Theodora W. Youmans, American journalist and women's suffrage activist
- Vincent Youmans, American Broadway composer
- Will Youmans, Palestinian-American academic, human rights activist, and rapper
- William Youmans, Broadway actor, grand-nephew of Vincent
- William Jay Youmans, American editor, scientist, and science writer; brother of Edward L. Youmans
