= Popular science (disambiguation) =

Popular science is an interpretation of science intended for a general audience.

It may also refer to:

- Science in popular culture, the occurrence of scientific topics in popular media

Magazines

- Popular Science (a.k.a. PopSci), a U.S. magazine on science, technology, and industry founded in 1872
  - Popular Science Italia, the Italian edition
- Harmsworth Popular Science, a British magazine on science and technology from the turn of the 20th century

Other uses

- Popular Science (film series) a series of short films from Paramount about science, technology and industry (1935-1950)

== See also ==
- Antiscience
- Pseudoscience
- Politics of science
- Science outreach
- Science communication
- Science, technology and society
- Popular (disambiguation)
- Science (disambiguation)
