= Yeoman (disambiguation) =

A yeoman was a member of an English social class, generally a freeman who owned his own farm. The term was also used in North America.

Yeoman or yeomen may also refer to:

== Military ==
- Yeoman (United States Navy), a rating in the United States Navy dealing with administrative and clerical work
  - Yeoman (F), a World War I–era United States Naval rating for women
- A rating in the United States Coast Guard dealing with administrative and clerical work
- HMS Yeoman, the name of more than two ships of the British Royal Navy
- A member of the Yeomanry, the volunteer cavalry regiments of the British Army
- Yeoman of signals, a signals petty officer in the Royal Navy or a senior communications specialist in the British Army

== Places ==
- Yeoman, Indiana, a town in the United States
- Yeoman Island, Canada

== Sports teams ==
- Yeoman Football Club, an Australian rules football club based in Burnie, Tasmania, Australia
- Yeoman Cricket Club, merged in 1989 to form Burnie/Yeoman Cricket Club, representing Burnie, Tasmania
- Yeomen, the sports teams of Oberlin College, Ohio, United States, whose mascot is the Yeoman
- Yeomen, the sports teams of York University, Canada, whose mascot was the Yeoman

== Other uses ==
- Chevrolet Yeoman, a station wagon
- The Yeomen (band), 1960s band from New Zealand
- Yeoman (surname)
- Yeoman Aviation, an Australian company set up to produce agricultural aircraft, such as the Yeoman Cropmaster
- Yeomans, butterflies of India
- Yeoman (software), a set of tools for building web applications
- Yeoman (hill), a categorisation of British hill
- Yeoman (household servant)

== See also ==
- Yeomen of the Guard, the royal bodyguard of England
- The Yeomen of the Guard, a Gilbert and Sullivan opera
- Yeomen Warders, of the Tower of London, England
- Butterflies of the genus Cirrochroa
- Yeomans (disambiguation)
- Youmans, a surname
- Eoman (disambiguation)
