= Yeomans =

Yeomans is an English surname meaning son of Yeoman. Guppy reported it from Derbyshire and Herefordshire.

Notable people with the surname include:

- Amelia Yeomans (1842–1913), Canadian physician and suffragist
- Bill Yeomans (20th century), Australian rugby player
- Frank E. Yeomans, psychotherapist
- Gael Yeomans (born 1988), Chilean politician and lawyer
- Harry Yeomans (1901–1965), English football player
- Hec Yeomans (1895–1968), Australian football player
- John William Yeomans (1800–1863), Presbyterian pastor, and the president of Lafayette College
- John Yeomans (writer) (1916–1995), Australian journalist and writer
- Julia Yeomans, British theoretical physicist
- Kelly Yeomans (1984–1997), English schoolgirl who committed suicide
- Lee Columbus Yeomans (1892–1951), American politician
- Lucy Yeomans (21st century), fashion magazine editor
- P. A. Yeomans (1904–1984), Australian inventor
- Solomon Yeomans Chesley (1796–1880), public servant and political figure in Canada West
- Stephen Prentice Yeomans (1822–1903), American physician and politician in Iowa

== See also ==
- Yeoman (disambiguation)
- 2956 Yeomans, a main-belt asteroid
