= Senator Youmans =

Senator Youmans may refer to:

- Clarion A. Youmans (1847–1906), Wisconsin State Senate
- Henry M. Youmans (1832–1920), Michigan State Senate
