= Thomas F. Ramsey =

American politician

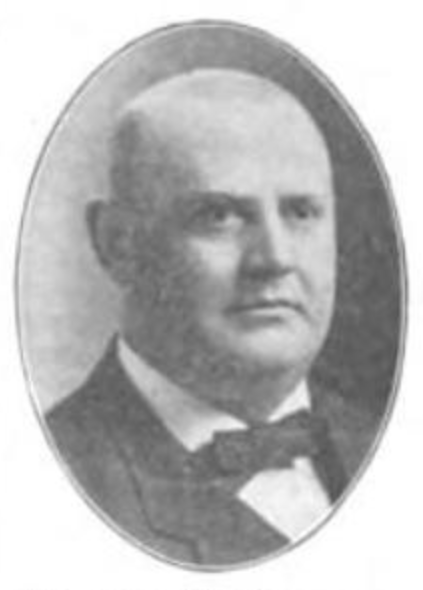

Member of the Wisconsin State Assembly from the Milwaukee 6th district
- In office January 1, 1909 – January 1, 1911
- Preceded by: Lucian H. Palmer
- Succeeded by: Chauncey W. Yockey
- In office January 1, 1905 – January 1, 1907
- Preceded by: Thomas F. Timlin
- Succeeded by: Lucian H. Palmer

Personal details
- Born: December 12, 1858 Milwaukee, Wisconsin
- Died: September 7, 1911 (aged 52) Milwaukee, Wisconsin
- Resting place: Calvary Cemetery; Milwaukee, Wisconsin
- Party: Democratic
- Occupation: Politician

Thomas F. Ramsey (December 12, 1858 – September 7, 1911) was a member of the Wisconsin State Assembly.

== Background ==
Ramsey was born on December 12, 1858, in Milwaukee, Wisconsin. He worked as an insurance and real estate broker. He later worked for the Western Union Telegraph Company and Postal Telegraph Company.

== Political career ==
By 1904, Ramsey had been a member of the Milwaukee Common Council, and a trustee of the Milwaukee Public Museum, for seven years, when he was elected to the Assembly's Sixth Milwaukee County's District (the 3rd, 4th and 7th wards of the City of Milwaukee), as a Democrat. The prior incumbent, fellow Democrat Thomas F. Timlin (also an insurance and real-estate agent), had died since the previous session. Ramsey drew 2,404 votes against 2,199 for Republican Albert L. Vannaman and 750 for Social Democrat Joseph P. Lahm. He was assigned to the standing committee on legislative expenditures.

In 1906, he was unseated by Republican Lucian H. Palmer, a Republican who would thus become the first African-American member of the Wisconsin Legislature. Palmer won with 1668 votes, to Ramsey's 1601, Social Democrat Joseph Sultair's 507, and Prohibitionist Lyle Walker's 89. Palmer was not the Republican nominee in 1908, being replaced on the ticket by white attorney Chauncey W. Yockey. Ramsey reclaimed his old seat, with 2352 votes to Yockey's 1770 and Social Democrat Edward Campbell's 579. He was assigned to the committee on cities. In 1910, Yockey was once more the Republican nominee, and unseated Ramsey in turn, with 1298 votes to Ramsey's 1218 and Social Democrat William Gladdings' 727.

== Death ==
Ramsey died in Milwaukee on September 7, 1911, from "heart trouble" (while under scrutiny for his role in the election of Isaac Stephenson to the United States Senate) and is interred in Calvary Cemetery.
