= Lucian H. Palmer =

American politician (1855–1923)

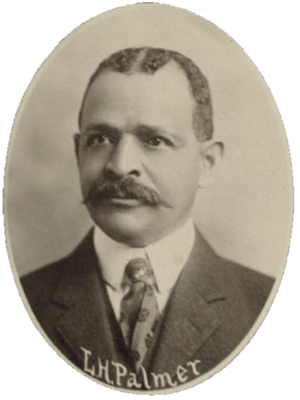

Member of the Wisconsin State Assembly from the Milwaukee 6th district
- In office January 1, 1907 – January 1, 1909
- Preceded by: Thomas F. Ramsey
- Succeeded by: Thomas F. Ramsey

Personal details
- Born: March 12, 1855 Huntsville, Alabama, US
- Died: February 17, 1923 (aged 67) Milwaukee, Wisconsin, US
- Resting place: Arlington Park Cemetery, Greenfield, Wisconsin
- Party: Republican
- Education: Central Tennessee College
- Occupation: politician, businessman

Lucian H. Palmer (March 12, 1855 – February 17, 1923) was an American politician and businessman. He was the first African American elected to the Wisconsin Legislature. A Republican, he served one term in the Wisconsin State Assembly (from 1907 to 1909) representing Milwaukee County's 6th assembly district—downtown Milwaukee. His first name is sometimes spelled Lucien in historical documents.

== Biography ==
Lucian Palmer was born in Huntsville, Alabama, in the years just before the American Civil War. At age seven, he was left without parents. Several years later, he moved with his older sister to Nashville, Tennessee, where he attended public schools. He worked and paid his way through Central Tennessee College, where he graduated in 1876.

After graduating from college, he was hired at the Grand Pacific Hotel in Chicago, and later became manager of Lakeside Resort in Pewaukee, Wisconsin. He ran his own catering business from 1883 until the Panic of 1893. Afterward, he became a steward at the Milwaukee Yacht Club. He resigned to become superintendent and steward of the Wisconsin building at the St. Louis World's Fair, in 1904. Following the exposition, he returned to Milwaukee and was hired as steward of the Pasadena Flats.

In 1906, he ran as a Progressive Republican for the Wisconsin State Assembly and won a shocking victory over incumbent Democrat Thomas F. Ramsey. Newspapers at the time marveled at the "peculiar incident" of the "first colored man to go to the state legislature". It was also noted that, at the time, Palmer represented the wealthiest district in the state.

During his one term in the Assembly, Palmer served on the Assembly committees on public health and on federal relations. In the latter capacity, he fought for a resolution on the Brownsville affair, requesting a more thorough investigation of the events. The incident involved accusations against the African American United States Army soldiers in the 25th Infantry Regiment, stationed at Fort Brown, near Brownsville. After the initial investigation, President Theodore Roosevelt ordered 167 African American men of the regiment to be dishonorably discharged. A more thorough investigation did eventually occur, allowing several of the men to re-enlist.

Although he sought renomination in 1908, the Republicans instead nominated Chauncey W. Yockey, who went on to lose the general election to Thomas F. Ramsey, who reclaimed his seat.

Outside of politics, he was a trustee at St. Mark African Methodist Episcopal Church in Milwaukee, and a Freemason.

He died at his home in Milwaukee on February 17, 1923. The Wisconsin Assembly issued a resolution in his honor on February 27, 1923.

== Electoral history ==
=== Wisconsin Assembly (1906) ===
Wisconsin Assembly, Milwaukee 6th District Election, 1906
Party	Candidate	Votes	%	±%
General Election, November 6, 1906
Republican	Lucian H. Palmer	1,668	44.17%	+1.32%
Democratic	Thomas F. Ramsey (incumbent)	1,601	42.40%	−0.74%
Social Democratic	Joseph Sultaire	507	13.43%	−0.58%
Plurality		67	1.77%	-2.06%
Total votes		3,776	100.0%	-29.46%
Republican gain from Democratic		Swing	5.60%	

Wisconsin State Assembly
Preceded by Thomas F. Ramsey	Member of the Wisconsin State Assembly from the Milwaukee 6th district January 1, 1907 – January 1, 1909	Succeeded by Thomas F. Ramsey
