= William Timlin =

William Timlin may refer to:

- William H. Timlin (1852–1916), American lawyer and judge
- William M. Timlin (1892–1943), British-South African architect and artist
