= Allen R. Bushnell =

American politician (1833–1909)

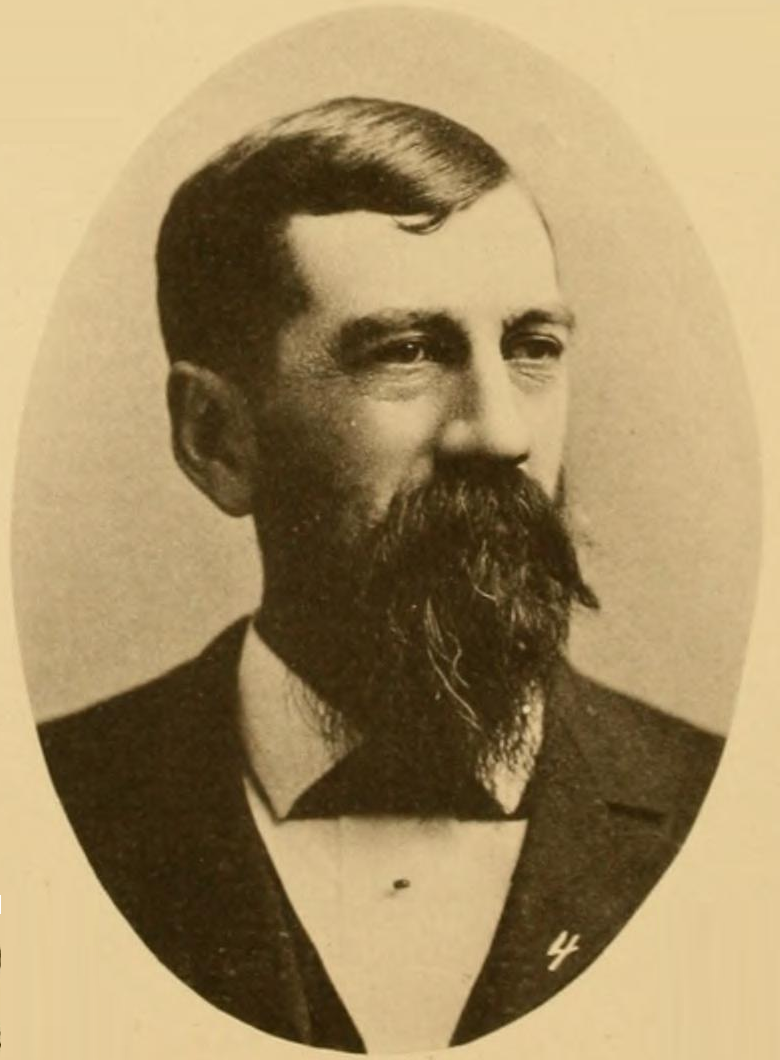
- From Soldiers and Citizens' Album of Biographical Record (1888)

Member of the U.S. House of Representatives from Wisconsin's 3rd district
- In office March 4, 1891 – March 3, 1893
- Preceded by: Robert M. La Follette Sr.
- Succeeded by: Joseph W. Babcock

United States Attorney for the Western District of Wisconsin
- In office April 1886 – April 1890
- President: Grover Cleveland; Benjamin Harrison
- Preceded by: H. M. Lewis
- Succeeded by: Samuel A. Harper

1st Mayor of Lancaster, Wisconsin
- In office April 1878 – April 1879
- Preceded by: Position established
- Succeeded by: George Clementson

Member of the Wisconsin State Assembly from the Grant 2nd district
- In office January 1, 1872 – January 6, 1873
- Preceded by: Henry B. Coons
- Succeeded by: William H. Clise

District Attorney of Grant County, Wisconsin
- In office Summer 1864 – January 2, 1865
- Appointed by: James T. Lewis
- Preceded by: Joseph Trotter Mills
- Succeeded by: George Cochrane Hazelton
- In office January 7, 1861 – August 1861
- Preceded by: Joseph Trotter Mills
- Succeeded by: Joseph Trotter Mills

Personal details
- Born: July 18, 1833 Hartford, Ohio, U.S.
- Died: March 29, 1909 (aged 75) Madison, Wisconsin, U.S.
- Cause of death: Pneumonia
- Resting place: Hillside Cemetery, Lancaster, Wisconsin
- Party: Democratic; Republican (before 1876)
- Spouses: Laura F. Burr (died 1873); Mary P. Sherman (m. 1875)
- Children: with Laura Burr; Mabel (Kerr)^{(b. 1869; died 1936)}; Curtis Bushnell^{(b. 1870; died 1870)}; Fay Chase Bushnell^{(b. 1872; died 1872)}; with Mary Sherman; Edward Bushnell^{(b. 1876; died 1877)}; Floyd H. Bushnell^{(b. 1883; died 1896)}; Alfred H. Bushnell^{(died after 1909)}

Military service
- Allegiance: United States
- Branch/service: United States Volunteers; Union Army
- Years of service: 1861–1863
- Rank: Captain, USV
- Unit: 7th Reg. Wis. Vol. Infantry
- Battles/wars: American Civil War; Northern Virginia campaign; First Battle of Rappahannock Station; Second Battle of Bull Run; Fredericksburg campaign; Battle of Fredericksburg; Mud March

Allen Ralph Bushnell (July 18, 1833 – March 29, 1909) was an American lawyer, politician, and Wisconsin pioneer. He served one term in the U.S. House of Representatives, representing Wisconsin's 3rd congressional district for the 52nd Congress (1891–1893). Before his service in Congress, he was the first mayor of Lancaster, Wisconsin (1878), and served as U.S. attorney for the Western District of Wisconsin (1886–1890), appointed by President Grover Cleveland.

Earlier, he served one term in the Wisconsin State Assembly (1872). In the 1860s, he served as district attorney of Grant County, Wisconsin, but took leave from those duties to serve as a Union Army officer in the American Civil War; in the war, he served with the famous Iron Brigade of the Army of the Potomac.

Bushnell began his political career as a Republican, winning his elections as district attorney and member of the Assembly on the Republican ticket. He switched to the Democratic Party in the mid 1870s due to his disdain for the political machine running the Republican Party of Wisconsin. He was elected mayor and member of Congress on the Democratic ticket.

== Early life ==
Born in Hartford, Ohio, Bushnell attended the public schools of Hartford, and attended Oberlin and Hiram colleges in Ohio and studied law. He moved to Grant County, Wisconsin, in 1854 and read law in the office of attorney Stephen O. Paine, in Platteville. He taught school to help with his expenses, and, in December 1857, he was admitted to the Wisconsin Bar at Lancaster, Wisconsin. He established his own legal practice in Platteville, which he maintained for the next four years.

In 1860, he was elected district attorney of Grant County, taking office in January 1861. However, he served only a few months in the position; after the outbreak of the American Civil War, Bushnell resigned his office to volunteer for service with the Union Army.

== Civil War service ==
He responded to President Abraham Lincoln's call for 75,000 volunteers, and was enrolled as a private in a company of militia known as the Platteville Guards, which afterward became Company C of the 7th Wisconsin Infantry Regiment. At the time the regiment mustered into service, Bushnell was commissioned as first lieutenant of the company.

Upon arriving in the eastern theater of the war, the 7th Wisconsin Infantry was organized into a brigade under General Rufus King with the 2nd Wisconsin, 6th Wisconsin, and 19th Indiana regiments. Their brigade soon became famous in the war as the Iron Brigade of the Army of the Potomac. He rose to the rank of captain of Company C, fighting at the Second Battle of Bull Run and the Battle of Fredericksburg, and received an honorable discharge in 1863 due to medical disability. After his discharge, he returned to Ohio, where he was under the care of his father for the next year.

== Political career ==
He returned to Wisconsin in 1864 to resume the practice of law, but relocated from Platteville to Lancaster. Shortly after returning to Wisconsin, his successor as Grant County district attorney, Joseph Trotter Mills, resigned after being elected to the Wisconsin circuit court judgeship. Governor James T. Lewis appointed Bushnell to fill out the remainder of Mills' term as district attorney, expiring in January 1865.

He resumed his interest in politics with the Republican Party of Wisconsin, and, in 1871, he was elected to the Wisconsin State Assembly for Grant County's 2nd Assembly district, defeating James Wilson Seaton. He served on the Assembly Committee on the Judiciary and the Joint Committee on Charitable and Penal Institutions. After Lancaster was incorporated as a city in 1878, Bushnell was elected as its first mayor.

Despite his history in the Republican party, in 1876 he endorsed and campaigned for Democrat Samuel J. Tilden for President, due to his exasperation over the spending of the post-war years, and his contempt for the Republican political machine. He subsequently became attached to the Democratic Party. When Democrat Grover Cleveland became President in 1885, Bushnell was appointed United States Attorney for the Western District of Wisconsin, and ultimately served until a successor was appointed by President Benjamin Harrison, in 1890.

Later that year, he was the Democratic nominee for United States House of Representatives in Wisconsin's 3rd congressional district, and unseated Republican Robert M. La Follette in the wave election of 1890. He moved his residence to Madison, Wisconsin, in 1891, before being sworn in to the 52nd United States Congress in March. He became a proponent of silver-backed currency. His most lasting contribution was likely his support for a proposed constitutional amendment for the direct election of U.S. senators—the measure passed the House of Representatives, but failed in the Senate. The concept would take another 20 years to be ratified as the Seventeenth Amendment to the United States Constitution.

The 1891 congressional redistricting significantly affected Bushnell, putting him in the same district as fellow incumbent Democrat Charles Barwig. The party chose to renominate Barwig instead of Bushnell in the 1892 election, and Bushnell left office in March 1893.

== Later years ==
He resumed the practice of law in Madison, and worked as counsel and treasurer for the Wisconsin Life Insurance Company. He stood for office one final time, running for Wisconsin Supreme Court in 1906, but was defeated by attorney William H. Timlin in a four-way race.

He contracted pneumonia while attending his sister's funeral in Platteville, and died at his home in Madison on March 29, 1909. He was interred at Hillside Cemetery, in Lancaster.

== Personal life and family ==
Allen Bushnell was the son of Dr. George W. Bushnell and his wife Sarah (née Bates). He was first married to Laura F. Burr and had three children with her before her death in 1873, though only one daughter survived infancy. He subsequently married a cousin of Laura Burr, Mary P. Sherman, in 1875. With Mary Sherman, he had at least three more children, though only one son, Alfred, survived childhood.

== Electoral history ==
=== Wisconsin Assembly (1871) ===
Wisconsin Assembly, Grant 2nd District Election, 1871
Party	Candidate	Votes	%	±%
General Election, November 7, 1871
Republican	Allen R. Bushnell	630	53.16%	+4.61%
Democratic	James Wilson Seaton	527	44.47%	−6.97%
Independent	Henry Bugbee	28	2.36%	
Plurality		103	8.69%	+5.80%
Total votes		1,185	100.0%	+55.92%
Republican gain from Democratic		Swing	11.59%	

=== U.S. House of Representatives (1890) ===
Wisconsin's 3rd Congressional District Election, 1890
Party	Candidate	Votes	%	±%
General Election, November 4, 1890
Democratic	Allen R. Bushnell	16,432	49.15%	+6.88%
Republican	Robert M. La Follette (incumbent)	15,430	46.16%	−3.79%
Prohibition	Marlon Ames	1,567	4.69%	−2.27%
Plurality		1,002	3.00%	-4.68%
Total votes		33,429	100.0%	-12.35%
Democratic gain from Republican		Swing	10.68%	

=== Wisconsin Supreme Court (1906) ===
1906 Wisconsin Supreme Court election
Party	Candidate	Votes	%	±%
General Election, April 3, 1906
Nonpartisan	William H. Timlin	60,528	35.61	
Nonpartisan	James O'Neill	51,848	30.51	
Nonpartisan	Allen R. Bushnell	39,818	23.43	
Nonpartisan	H. H. Grace	16,419	9.66	
	Scattering	1,349	0.79	
Plurality		8,680	5.11	
Total votes		169,962	100	

Wisconsin State Assembly
Preceded by Henry B. Coons	Member of the Wisconsin State Assembly from the Grant 2nd district January 1, 1872 – January 6, 1873	Succeeded by William H. Clise
U.S. House of Representatives
Preceded by Robert M. La Follette, Sr.	Member of the U.S. House of Representatives from Wisconsin's 3rd congressional district March 4, 1891 - March 3, 1893	Succeeded by Joseph W. Babcock
Political offices
City government established	Mayor of Lancaster, Wisconsin; April 1878 – April 1879	Succeeded by George Clementson
Legal offices
Preceded by Joseph Trotter Mills	District Attorney of Grant County, Wisconsin; January 7, 1861 – August 1861	Succeeded by Joseph Trotter Mills
Preceded by Joseph Trotter Mills	District Attorney of Grant County, Wisconsin; Summer 1864 – January 2, 1865	Succeeded by George Cochrane Hazelton
Preceded by H. M. Lewis	United States Attorney for the Western District of Wisconsin; April 1886 – April 1890	Succeeded by Samuel A. Harper
