= Thomas F. Timlin =

American politician

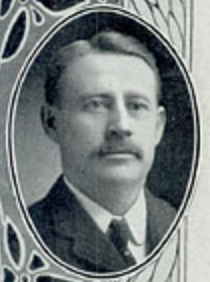
- From the 1903 Wisconsin Blue Book

Member of the Wisconsin State Assembly from the Milwaukee 6th district
- In office January 5, 1903 – October 29, 1903 (death)
- Preceded by: Francis Eline
- Succeeded by: Thomas F. Ramsey

Personal details
- Born: September 28, 1863 Mequon, Wisconsin, U.S.
- Died: October 29, 1903 (aged 40) Wisconsin, U.S.
- Resting place: Calvary Cemetery, Milwaukee
- Party: Democratic
- Spouse: Clara G. Bauer (m. 1893–1903)
- Children: William Thomas Timlin^{(b. 1893; died 1945)}; Gerald Bohan Timlin^{(b. 1894; died 1964)}; Clara Timlin^{(b. 1896; died 1977)}; Ellen M. (Quick)^{(b. 1898; died 1982)}
- Relatives: William H. Timlin (1st cousin)

Thomas F. Timlin (September 28, 1863 – October 29, 1903) was an American businessman and politician from Milwaukee, Wisconsin. He was a member of the Wisconsin State Assembly, representing Milwaukee's 6th Assembly district during the 1903 session, but he died before the end of his term.

== Background ==
Timlin was born in Mequon, Wisconsin, on September 28, 1863, and came to Milwaukee in 1868. He was educated at St. Gall's Academy; after graduating he was in the grocery business until 1893 when he was appointed tax assessor of the fourth assessment district, a job he left in 1900, resigning to go into the real estate and fire insurance business.

== Politics ==
In 1902, Timlin was chosen as the Democratic nominee in Milwaukee's 6th Assembly district. This was the first election after the 1901 redistricting act in which the 6th district moved from a northeast city lakeshore district to a downtown district, taking much of the territory of the previous 1st and 2nd Assembly districts. In the general election, he defeated Republican Bart J. Ruddle and Social Democrat William H. Statz. He was assigned to the standing committee on ways and means.

== Death ==
Timlin died of pneumonia on October 29, 1903. The Assembly passed a resolution in March 1905, as part of a memorial for Timlin and two other members who had died since the end of the 1903 session. He would be succeeded in the Assembly by fellow Democrat Thomas F. Ramsey (who was also an insurance and real-estate agent).

== Personal life and family ==
Timlin was one of at least four children born to Irish American immigrants William and Ellen (née Bohan) Timlin. During his childhood, his father adopted their cousin—William H. Timlin—who had been orphaned. William H. Timlin later went on to become a prominent lawyer and a justice of the Wisconsin Supreme Court.

Thomas Timlin married Clara Bauer in 1893. They had at least four children together, who all survived him.

Wisconsin State Assembly
| Preceded by Francis Eline | Member of the Wisconsin State Assembly from the Milwaukee 6th district January 5, 1903 – October 29, 1903 (death) | Succeeded by Thomas F. Ramsey |
