= Merritt C. Ring =

19th century American lawyer and politician

Member of the Wisconsin Senate from the 11th district
- In office January 5, 1885 – January 3, 1887
- Preceded by: Charles M. Webb
- Succeeded by: George F. Merrill

Member of the Wisconsin State Assembly from the Clark County district
- In office January 7, 1889 – January 5, 1891
- Preceded by: Richard Dewhurst
- Succeeded by: Phillip Rossman

Personal details
- Born: October 30, 1850 Milton, Wisconsin, U.S.
- Died: July 21, 1915 (aged 64) Neillsville, Wisconsin, U.S.
- Resting place: Neillsville City Cemetery, Neillsville
- Party: Republican
- Spouse: Ida Austin (m. 1887–1915)
- Children: Blanche (Huntzicker)^{(b. 1878; died 1951)}; Alice (Zerkle)^{(b. 1883; died 1940)}
- Profession: Lawyer

Merritt Clarke Ring (October 30, 1850 – July 21, 1915) was an American lawyer and Republican politician from Clark County, Wisconsin. He was a member of the Wisconsin Senate during the 1885 session, and was a member of the State Assembly for 1889.

== Biography ==
Born in Milton, Wisconsin, he moved with his family to Madison and then Sparta, Wisconsin, where he went to school. He taught school and then went to the University of Wisconsin Law School graduating in 1873. He then practiced law with Clarion A. Youmans in Neillsville, Wisconsin. He also owned a livestock farm. Ring served in the Wisconsin State Senate in 1885 and then in the Wisconsin State Assembly in 1889 as a Republican. In 1892, Ring was appointed special statistic agent for the United States Department of Agriculture for Europe with offices in London, England. He also served as United States deputy consul general in London. In 1895, he was appointed attorney for the Chicago and North Western Railway. He died in Neillsville, Wisconsin.

Wisconsin State Assembly
Preceded by Richard Dewhurst	Member of the Wisconsin State Assembly from the Clark County district January 7, 1889 – January 5, 1891	Succeeded by Phillip Rossman
Wisconsin Senate
Preceded by Charles M. Webb	Member of the Wisconsin Senate from the 11th district January 5, 1885 – January 3, 1887	Succeeded by George F. Merrill
