= William H. Timlin =

19th century American lawyer, Justice of the Wisconsin Supreme Court

The Honorable William H. Timlin
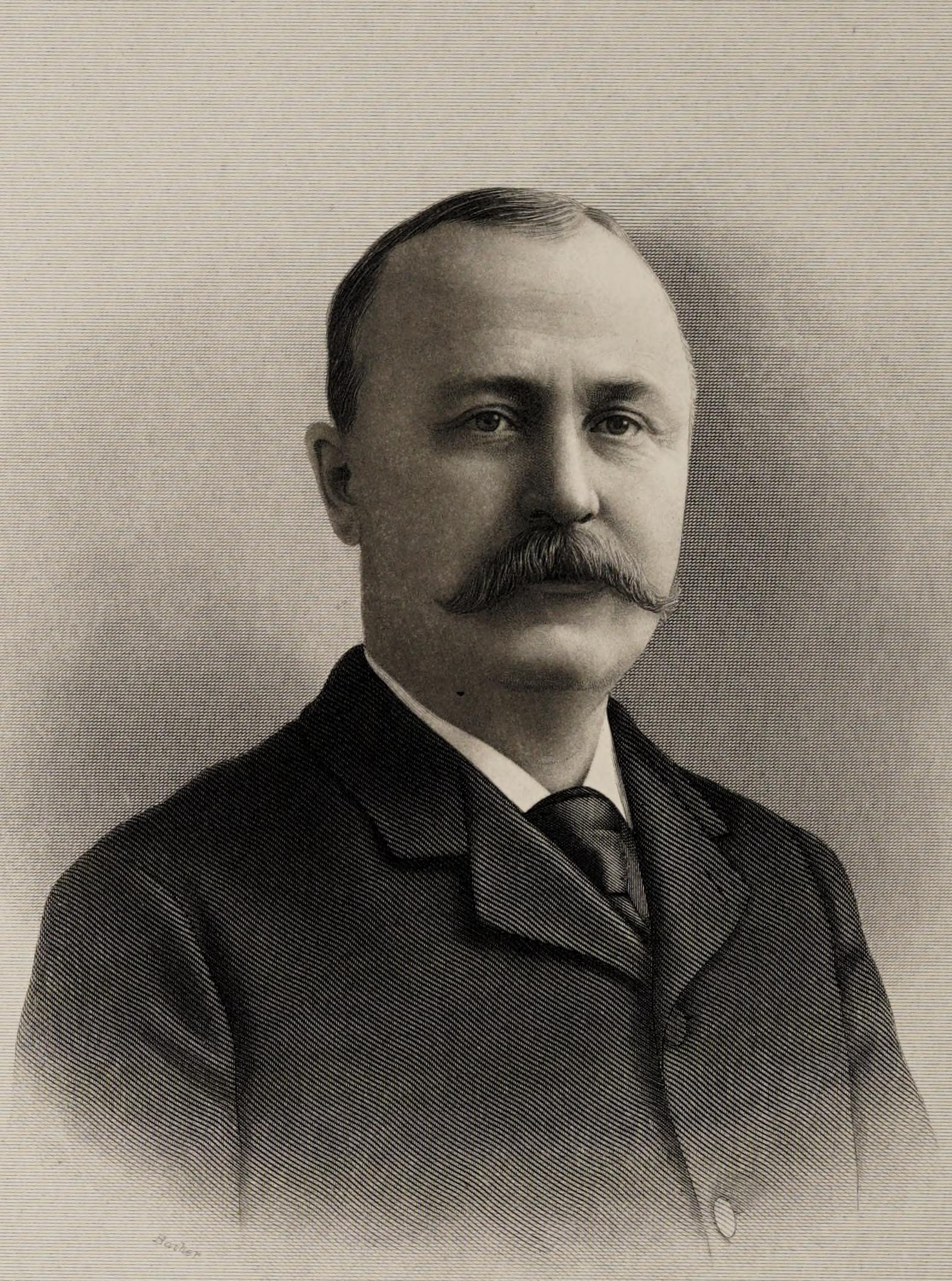

Justice of the Wisconsin Supreme Court
- In office January 1, 1907 – August 21, 1916
- Preceded by: New seat
- Succeeded by: Franz C. Eschweiler

Personal details
- Born: William Henry Timlin; May 28, 1852 Mequon, Wisconsin
- Died: August 21, 1916 (aged 64) Milwaukee, Wisconsin
- Resting place: Calvary Cemetery; Milwaukee, Wisconsin
- Spouses: Cecelia L. Arpin; (m. 1880; died 1935)
- Children: William Henry Timlin, Jr.^{(b. 1883; died 1934)}; Adah Ellen (Frey)^{(b. 1884; died 1940)}; Kathleen Adeline (Rice)^{(b. 1905; died 1985)}; Cecil Timlin^{(died young)}
- Parents: Edward Timlin (father); Hannah Timlin (mother)
- Relatives: Thomas F. Timlin (1st cousin)

William Henry Timlin (May 28, 1852 – August 21, 1916) was an American lawyer and judge. He was a justice of the Wisconsin Supreme Court for the last ten years of his life.

== Biography ==
Born in Mequon, Wisconsin. His father was an Irish American immigrant who had served as Treasurer of Washington County, Wisconsin, which then also included all of Ozaukee County. His mother died when he was six, and his father, who volunteered for the Union Army, disappeared during the American Civil War. Thus Timlin was raised, from age nine, by his uncle, who was a farmer struggling with financial hardship.

He worked on his uncle's farm but got little formal education. His uncle died during his teenage years, and more hardship followed. He studied surveying and stenography and taught school to make money. At age 25, he was employed as a stenographer at the Wisconsin Circuit Court in Kewaunee, Wisconsin.

Timlin studied law under G. G. Sedgwick, and later H. G. and W. J. Turner, and was admitted to the State Bar of Wisconsin in 1878. He practiced law in Kewaunee, where he also served as superintendent of the public schools. He later moved to Milwaukee, Wisconsin, where he carried on his legal career.

In 1906, he was elected to a newly created seat on the Wisconsin Supreme Court. He did not seek re-election in 1916, and ultimately died four months before the end of his term.

== Electoral history ==
1906 Wisconsin Supreme Court election
Party	Candidate	Votes	%	±%
General Election, April 1906
Nonpartisan	William H. Timlin	60,528	35.61	
Nonpartisan	James O'Neill	51,848	30.51	
Nonpartisan	Allen R. Bushnell	39,818	23.43	
Nonpartisan	H. H. Grace	16,419	9.66	
	Scattering	1,349	0.79	
Plurality		8,680	5.11	
Total votes		169,962	100	

== Notes ==
Legal offices
New seat	Justice of the Wisconsin Supreme Court; 1907 – 1916	Succeeded by Franz C. Eschweiler
