= 1906 Wisconsin Supreme Court election =

- April 3, 1906

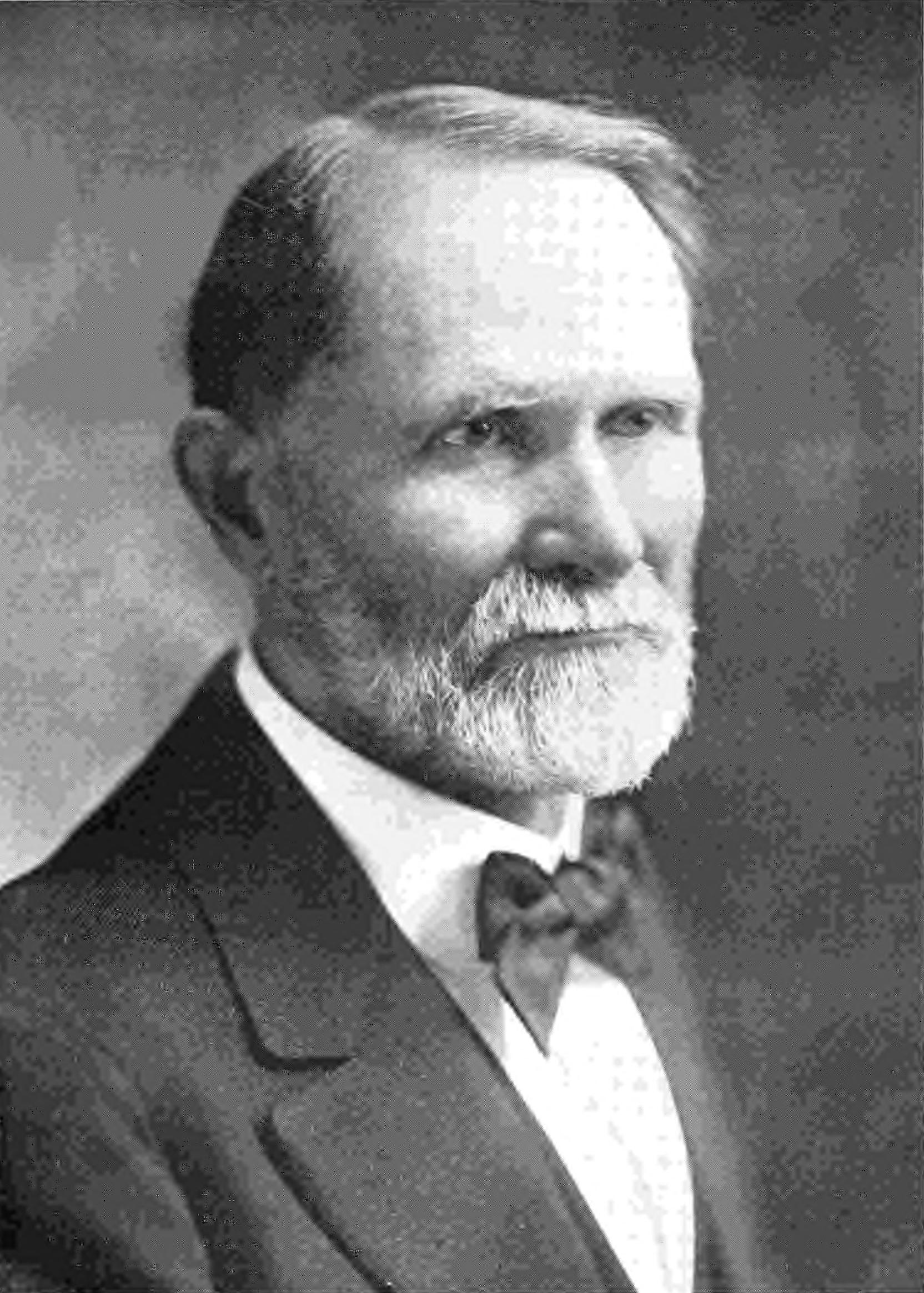

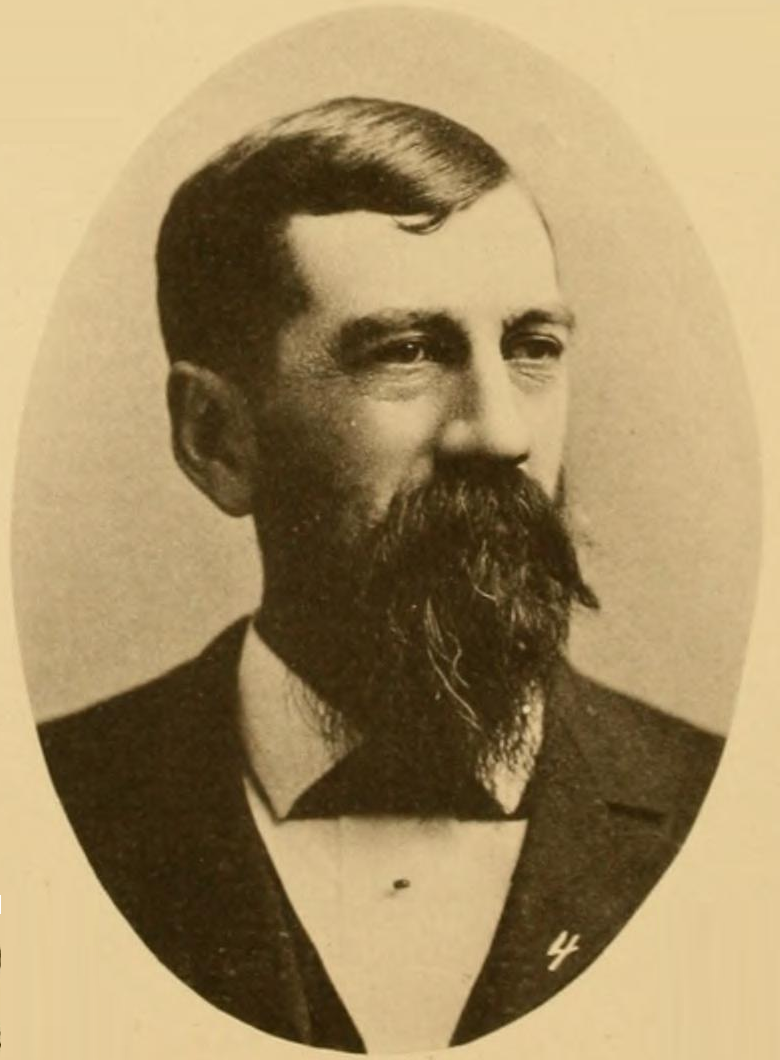

Candidate	William H. Timlin	James O'Neill
Popular vote	60,528	51,848
Percentage	35.61%	30.51%
Candidate	Allen R. Bushnell	H. H. Grace
Popular vote	39,818	16,419
Percentage	23.43%	9.66%
- Timlin: 20–30% (Note: 47.03% of votes cast in Kenosha were blank and scattered, Timlin's votes were the next highest total) 30–40% 40–50% 50–60% 60–70% 70–80% 80–90% O'Neill: 30–40% 40–50% 50–60% 60–70% 70–80% 80–90% >90% Bushnell: 30–40% 40–50% 50–60% 70–80% Grace: 40–50%
Elected Justice
William H. Timlin

The 1906 Wisconsin Supreme Court election was held on Tuesday, April 3, 1906, to elect a justice to the Wisconsin Supreme Court for a ten-year term. The election was the first election to fill the newly created seventh seat on the court. Attorney William H. Timlin prevailed in a four-candidate race, winning a plurality of the vote.

== Candidates ==
- Allen R. Bushnell, former member of the U.S. House of Representatives (1891–1893)
- H. H. Grace, night watchman for the 28th Wisconsin legislature (1875–1876)
- James O'Neill, judge of the Wisconsin circuit court for the 17th circuit since 1897, former district attorney of Clark County
- William H. Timlin, attorney

== General election ==
=== Results ===
William H. Timlin won a plurality of the vote, which (under the election rules in place at the time) was sufficient to win election the court.

1906 Wisconsin Supreme Court election (Note: One must exercise caution using the Blue Book as a source for Wisconsin election data for the period of 1890-1920 as it was unreliable during this period.)
Party	Candidate	Votes	%	±%
General Election, April 1906
Nonpartisan	William H. Timlin	60,528	35.61	
Nonpartisan	James O'Neill	51,848	30.51	
Nonpartisan	Allen R. Bushnell	39,818	23.43	
Nonpartisan	H. H. Grace	16,419	9.66	
	Scattering	1,349	0.79	
Plurality		8,680	5.11	
Total votes		169,962	100	
