= Benjamin Mills =

American politician

Associate Justice of the Kentucky Court of Appeals
- In office 1820–1828
- Nominated by: Gabriel Slaughter
- Preceded by: John Rowan

Personal details
- Born: January 12, 1779 Worcester County, Maryland
- Died: December 6, 1831 (aged 52) Frankfort, Kentucky
- Spouse: Mary Read Thornton
- Profession: Lawyer

Benjamin Mills was a lawyer and judge who served in the Kentucky Circuit Courts and the Kentucky Court of Appeals. He also represented Bourbon County, Kentucky, in the Kentucky House of Representatives. Mills issued a significant ruling in the 1820 case of Rankin v. Lydia which dealt with the rights of slaves brought to the Northwest Territory, where slavery was illegal. Mills' opinion in Rankin established a precedent that was cited in U.S. courts until the abolition of slavery following the Civil War.

Later, Mills was ensnared in the state's Old Court – New Court controversy wherein the state legislature attempted to abolish the Court of Appeals in retaliation for its opinion overturning a piece of debt relief legislation. The legislature established a new Court of Appeals, and for a time, both courts claimed authority as the court of last resort in Kentucky. The controversial measure abolishing the old court was repealed in 1826, and Mills resigned from the court in 1828. He died suddenly of an apoplectic stroke on December 6, 1831.

== Early life ==
Benjamin Mills was born January 12, 1779, in Worcester County, Maryland. When he was young, the family moved to Washington, Pennsylvania, where Mills was educated and studied medicine.

Mills married Mary Read Thornton. One son, Thornton Anthony Mills, was born in September 1810. Another son, Benjamin Mills, was born June 23, 1820. The family attended Paris Presbyterian Church, and both Benjamin and Thornton became Presbyterian ministers. Benjamin also served as a brigadier general in the Union Army during the Civil War.

His nephew Joseph Trotter Mills, Wisconsin State Assemblyman and jurist, lived and studied with his uncle.

Mills served for a time as president of Washington Academy (now Washington and Lee University). Later, he moved to Bourbon County, Kentucky, with his father. He abandoned the practice of medicine and studied law, commencing practice in Paris, Kentucky, around 1806. He served six one-year terms in the Kentucky House of Representatives—in 1806, 1809, and 1813 through 1816. In 1816, he failed to secure a seat in the United States Senate, losing to Isham Talbot by three votes.

== Judicial career ==
In 1817, Governor Gabriel Slaughter appointed Mills to the circuit court of Montgomery County. In 1818, at the request of the bar in Fayette County, he was transferred to the circuit court there. In February 1820, Slaughter elevated him to the Kentucky Court of Appeals to replace John Rowan.

In 1820, Mills authored the court's opinion in the case of Rankin v. Lydia concerning the status of slaves born in the Northwest Territory where the Ordinance of 1787 outlawed slavery. In his opinion, Mills was careful to avoid judgments regarding the institution of slavery itself, but upheld the decision of the Shelby County circuit court that the slave (Lydia) ought to be freed under terms of an indenture she had agreed to in Indiana before being sold to a master in Kentucky. Mills' opinion set a precedent that was adhered to in Kentucky for the next forty-five years and was frequently cited in both northern and southern courts.

In 1823, Mills and his fellow Court of Appeals justices were ensnared in Kentucky's Old Court – New Court controversy. In response to the Panic of 1819, the Kentucky General Assembly had passed a law of replevin that was extremely favorable to debtors. The law was challenged in two separate cases—Lapsley v. Brashear and Blair v. Williams. In both cases, the circuit courts had ruled the replevin law impaired the obligation of contracts in violation of the Contract Clause of the United States Constitution and similar language in the Kentucky Constitution. In October 1823, Mills and fellow justices John Boyle and William Owsley upheld the lower courts' rulings. An outraged General Assembly passed a measure abolishing the Court of Appeals and setting up a new Court of Appeals in its place, which pro-relief governor John Adair stocked with judges favorable to the debt relief cause. The Old Court considered the action illegal, and for a time, both the Old and New Courts claimed authority as the court of last resort in Kentucky.

As the state's economy began to recover, Old Court supporters made steady gains in the legislature. By late 1826, they commanded a veto-proof majority in the General Assembly and passed legislation abolishing the New Court and reinstating the Old Court. In 1828, Boyle resigned his seat on the Court of Appeals to accept a federal judgeship. In an attempt to placate the remaining New Court supporters that insisted the Old Court judges did not represent the will of the people, Owsley and Mills also resigned, hoping to be reappointed and reconfirmed to their posts. Governor Thomas Metcalfe reappointed both, but the Kentucky Senate would not confirm them. Thus ended Mills' tenure on the Court of Appeals.

Following his time on the bench, Mills moved to Frankfort, where he resumed his legal practice. He died suddenly of an apoplectic stroke on December 6, 1831.
