= James O'Neill (Wisconsin settler) =

American politician (1810–1882)

James O'Neill (May 4, 1810 – March 28, 1882) was a Wisconsin settler, jurist, and sawmill owner.

He was born in Lisbon, New York and worked in lumber in Canada and New York. He also worked on riverboats on the Mississippi River.

The community of Neillsville was named in his honor, as was O'Neill Creek, which runs through the center of the city and drains into the Black River. He arrived in the area around 1845, looking for a location to build a sawmill along the Black River.

In 1854, O’Neill’s Mill, (as Neillsville was originally called), was selected as the county seat of Clark County.

O'Neill served as treasurer of Clark County in 1861-1865 and on the Clark County Board of Supervisors serving as chairman. He served in the Wisconsin State Assembly in 1849 and 1868. He owned a lumber business and hotel in Neillsville until his death.

His nephew was James O'Neill who was a judge and served in the Wisconsin State Assembly.

He died on March 28, 1882, and is buried in Neillsville City Cemetery.

== See also ==
- History of Wisconsin
