= Trow, Wisconsin =

- Ghost town
- Location within Wisconsin
- Coordinates: 44°29′30″N 90°45′46″W
- Country: United States
- State: Wisconsin
- County: Clark
- Town: Dewhurst
- Elevation: 1,014 ft (309 m)
- GNIS feature ID: 1840620

Trow is a ghost town in the town of Dewhurst, Clark County, Wisconsin, United States.

== History ==
The community was named for A. S. Trow, a local landowner.
