= Hartford, Ohio =

- Village
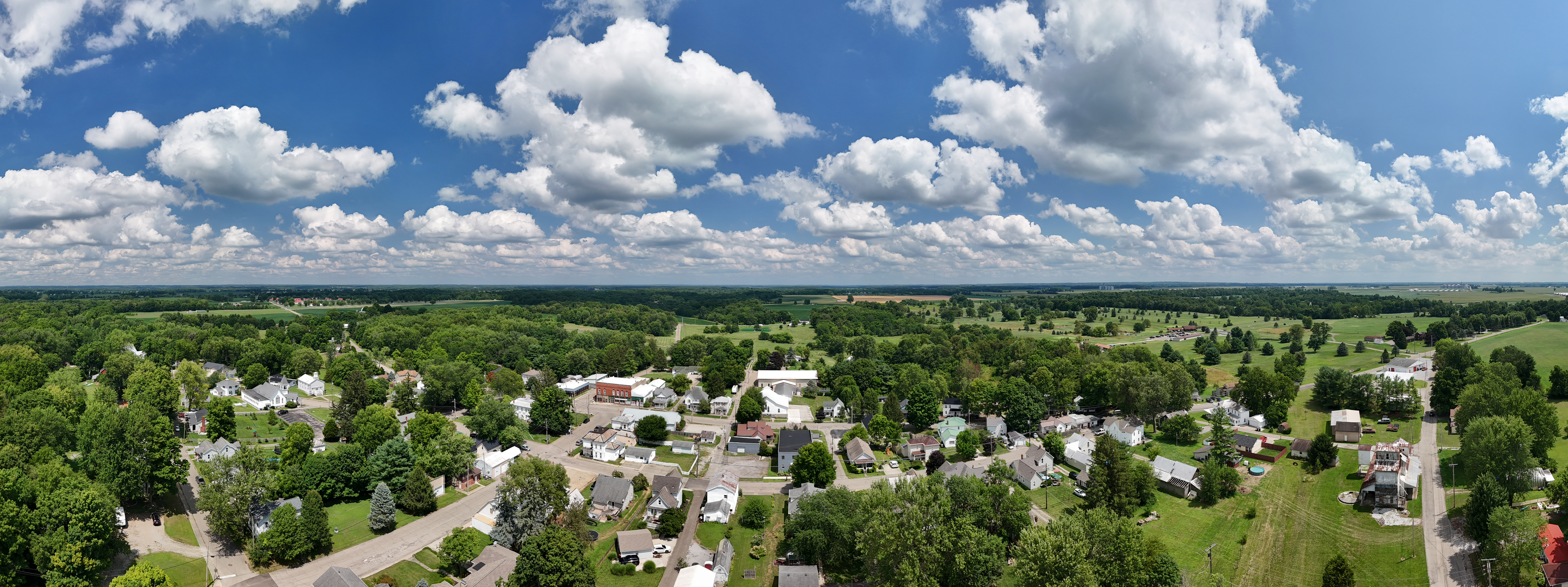
- Hartford, Ohio aerial view

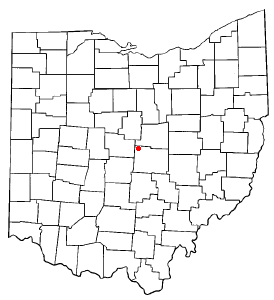
- Location of Hartford, Ohio

- Location in Licking County
- Coordinates: 40°14′22″N 82°41′18″W
- Country: United States
- State: Ohio
- County: Licking

Area
  - Total: 0.54 sq mi (1.39 km^{2})
  - Land: 0.53 sq mi (1.38 km^{2})
  - Water: 0.0039 sq mi (0.01 km^{2})
- Elevation: 1,175 ft (358 m)

Population (2020)
  - Total: 404
  - Estimate (2023): 404
  - Density: 757.1/sq mi (292.33/km^{2})
- Time zone: UTC-5 (Eastern (EST))
  - Summer (DST): UTC-4 (EDT)
- ZIP code: 43013
- FIPS code: 39-34202
- GNIS feature ID: 1085658
- Website: www.villageofhartfordohio.org

Hartford (also called Croton) is a village in the township of the same name in Licking County, Ohio, United States. The population was 404 at the 2020 census.

== History ==
Hartford was laid out in 1824, and named after Hartford, Connecticut, the native home of a share of the early settlers.

== Geography ==
According to the United States Census Bureau, the village has a total area of 0.55 square miles (1.42 km^{2}), all land.

Although the village is named Hartford, its post office is named Croton.

== Demographics ==
Historical population
| Census | Pop. | Note | %± |
|---|---|---|---|
| 1840 | 106 | | — |
| 1850 | 251 | | 136.8% |
| 1860 | 212 | | −15.5% |
| 1870 | 229 | | 8.0% |
| 1880 | 349 | | 52.4% |
| 1890 | 346 | | −0.9% |
| 1900 | 414 | | 19.7% |
| 1910 | 410 | | −1.0% |
| 1920 | 400 | | −2.4% |
| 1930 | 354 | | −11.5% |
| 1940 | 353 | | −0.3% |
| 1950 | 356 | | 0.8% |
| 1960 | 397 | | 11.5% |
| 1970 | 455 | | 14.6% |
| 1980 | 444 | | −2.4% |
| 1990 | 418 | | −5.9% |
| 2000 | 412 | | −1.4% |
| 2010 | 397 | | −3.6% |
| 2020 | 404 | | 1.8% |
| 2023 (est.) | 404 | | 0.0% |
U.S. Decennial Census

=== 2010 census ===
As of the census of 2010, there were 397 people, 151 households, and 106 families living in the village. The population density was 721.8 inhabitants per square mile (278.7/km^{2}). There were 161 housing units at an average density of 292.7 per square mile (113.0/km^{2}). The racial makeup of the village was 99.0% White, 0.3% African American, 0.5% Asian, and 0.3% from other races. Hispanic or Latino of any race were 1.3% of the population.

There were 151 households, of which 38.4% had children under the age of 18 living with them, 53.0% were married couples living together, 11.9% had a female householder with no husband present, 5.3% had a male householder with no wife present, and 29.8% were non-families. 26.5% of all households were made up of individuals, and 11.9% had someone living alone who was 65 years of age or older. The average household size was 2.63 and the average family size was 3.18.

The median age in the village was 37.4 years. 26.2% of residents were under the age of 18; 7.8% were between the ages of 18 and 24; 26.5% were from 25 to 44; 23.9% were from 45 to 64; and 15.6% were 65 years of age or older. The gender makeup of the village was 47.9% male and 52.1% female.

=== 2000 census ===
As of the census of 2000, there were 412 people, 149 households, and 119 families living in the village. The population density was 769.1 inhabitants per square mile (297.0/km^{2}). There were 170 housing units at an average density of 317.3 per square mile (122.5/km^{2}). The racial makeup of the village was 97.33% White, 0.49% Native American, 0.24% Asian, 0.24% from other races, and 1.70% from two or more races. Hispanic or Latino of any race were 0.97% of the population.

There were 149 households, out of which 35.6% had children under the age of 18 living with them, 63.1% were married couples living together, 12.8% had a female householder with no husband present, and 19.5% were non-families. 16.8% of all households were made up of individuals, and 6.0% had someone living alone who was 65 years of age or older. The average household size was 2.77 and the average family size was 3.05.

In the village, the population was spread out, with 25.5% under the age of 18, 13.6% from 18 to 24, 25.2% from 25 to 44, 23.5% from 45 to 64, and 12.1% who were 65 years of age or older. The median age was 33 years. For every 100 females there were 111.3 males. For every 100 females age 18 and over, there were 98.1 males.

The median income for a household in the village was $39,000, and the median income for a family was $39,375. Males had a median income of $29,028 versus $22,361 for females. The per capita income for the village was $15,699. About 3.3% of families and 6.0% of the population were below the poverty line, including 10.6% of those under age 18 and none of those age 65 or over.

== Notable people ==
- Allen R. Bushnell, U.S. Representative
- Doyt Perry, college football coach
