= Richard Dewhurst =

19th century American politician and judge

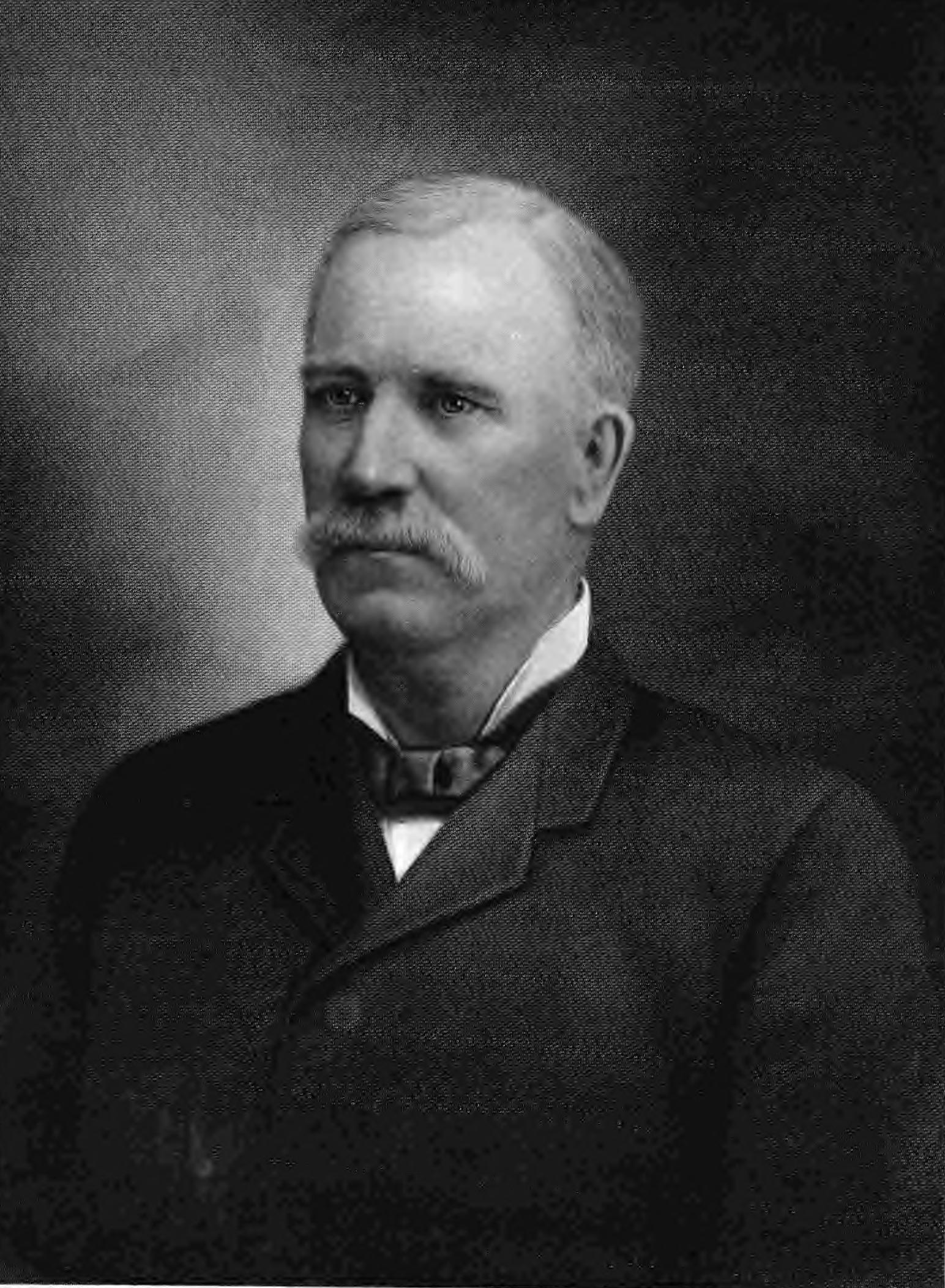
- Portrait from History of Clark County, Wisconsin (1918)

Member of the Wisconsin State Assembly from the Clark district
- In office January 3, 1887 – January 7, 1889
- Preceded by: James O'Neill
- Succeeded by: Merritt Clarke Ring

Member of the Wisconsin State Assembly from the Clark–Jackson district
- In office January 4, 1875 – January 3, 1876
- Preceded by: Mark Douglas
- Succeeded by: Hugh Mills
- In office January 2, 1865 – January 1, 1866
- Preceded by: Calvin R. Johnson
- Succeeded by: Leandor Merrill

Member of the Wisconsin State Assembly from the Chippewa–Clark–Dunn–Pierce district
- In office January 3, 1859 – January 2, 1860
- Preceded by: Lucius Cannon
- Succeeded by: William P. Bartlett

County Judge of Clark County, Wisconsin
- In office September 1856 – April 1861
- Succeeded by: S. N. Dickinson

Personal details
- Born: May 26, 1826 Manchester, England, UK
- Died: October 13, 1895 (aged 69) Atlanta, Georgia, U.S.
- Resting place: Neillsville City Cemetery, Neillsville, Wisconsin
- Spouse: Maria (died 1922)
- Children: Mrs. Wallace Hemphill
- Profession: lawyer

Richard Dewhurst (May 26, 1826 – October 13, 1895) was an English American immigrant, lawyer, judge, businessman, and politician. He served in the Wisconsin State Assembly for four non-consecutive terms over four different decades (from the 1850s to the 1880s) under four different political party labels (Republican, Union, Liberal Reform and Independent); and was defeated twice when running for election on the ticket of a fifth party, the Democratic.

== Background ==
Dewhurst was born near Manchester, England, on May 26, 1826; at the age of one year he came to the United States when his parents moved there, settling first in Bristol County, Massachusetts, then moving to Lorain County, Ohio, where they would spend the remainder of their lives, and where three more sons were born to them. Dewhurst spent a part of his boyhood and youth on his parents' farm, received a common school and academic education in Elyria, Ohio, subsequently read the law in the Oberlin, Ohio, office of one P. Bliss. He was admitted to the bar of Ohio, and in 1850 moved to Jo Daviess County, Illinois, where for a while he worked in the lead mines. For a year or two, he taught school in Scales Mound, Illinois, then moved about 1852 to Potosi in Grant County, Wisconsin.

== Public office and employment; first term in the Assembly; marriage and move; Civil War ==
By 1854, he was teaching school in Platteville, and in 1856, was admitted to the bar of Wisconsin at White Oak Springs, before moving on to Weston in May of that year. In 1856, he was elected Clark County's county judge, and register of deeds. In 1858, he was first elected a member of the Assembly for a one-year term in the Legislature's 12th (1859) session as a member of the newly organized Republican Party, succeeding fellow Republican Lucius Cannon in the district encompassing Chippewa, Clark, Dunn and Pierce counties. He was succeeded by William P. Bartlett (also a Republican). On March 29, 1859, he married Maria S. Curtis, who had been born in Ohio on April 9, 1840 (her parents, both natives of Connecticut, were married in Ohio and had settled at Cottage Grove, Wisconsin). After marriage, the Dewhursts came to Neillsville, settling on the bank of the creek below the mill. The nearest markets were then at Sparta and La Crosse, and the roads merely trails through the wilderness. They built a frame house, and there they began domestic life. Dewhurst engaged in logging, a widespread occupation in that region in those days. It was later remembered that there were still many American Indians in the area who often came to the Dewhurst home looking for handouts, and "were always given something."

During the American Civil War, Dewhurst served in a Wisconsin regiment and served as a deputy U. S. assessor in 1863-4.

== Second term in the Assembly ==
He was elected again in 1864 as a National Union candidate, to a district which now encompassed Clark and Jackson counties, succeeding Calvin R. Johnson (also a National Union candidate), and was assigned to the standing committees on banks and banking, and on school and university lands. His profession is described as land agent in the Wisconsin Blue Book for that term He was succeeded by yet another Union candidate, Leandor Merrill.

== After the second term; 1870s and beyond ==
He was elected again to the Assembly in 1874 as a candidate of the Liberal Reform Party (also called the Democratic Reform or simply Reform Party), a short-lived coalition of Democrats, reform and Liberal Republicans, and Grangers formed in 1873. He was the Reform nominee both for the 32nd Senate District, losing 2,097 to 2,354 to Republican Robert C. Field; and for his old Assembly district (Clark and Jackson Counties), defeating Republican James Hewett 1210 to 1179. With the Reform coalition starting to break down (Reform Governor William Robert Taylor, the heart of the party, was defeated for re-election), Dewhurst was not a candidate for re-election in 1875, and was succeeded by Republican Hugh B. Mills.

In 1875, he became county school superintendent; and upon the death of incumbent William Hutchinson he filled Hutchinson's unexpired term as county treasurer. In 1877 he once again became county judge, serving until 1879.

During this period he built a colonial home in Neillsville, and a block on the town's Main Street bearing his name. In 1874, Dewhurst travelled to Oregon, Washington and California, and in the late 1870s toured Scotland, Ireland, his native England and the French Exposition.

He ran for the Assembly again in 1884 as a Democrat (Clark County now had its own Assembly district), losing to Republican James O'Neill (the younger) with 1,515 votes to O'Neill's 1,831. He was elected as a member of the assembly for the fourth and final time in 1886 as an independent candidate, receiving 1,601 votes, against 1,019 votes for Republican T. J. La Flesh and 200 for Prohibitionist George A. Austin (O'Neill was not a candidate). This time, he was assigned to the committee on town and county organizations. He ran for re-election as a Democrat, and was defeated by Republican Merritt Clarke Ring.

== Personal life ==
At the time of his death, Dewhurst was president of the Neillsville Bank and held a like position in the German American Bank of Marshfield. He was a Mason and a member of the Universalist Church. He died of apoplexy on October 13, 1895, while visiting the Cotton States and International Exposition in Atlanta, Georgia; He'd left Neillsville for Atlanta on September 30, intending to spend some days at the Exposition and then proceed to his winter home in Florida.

The Town of Dewhurst, Wisconsin, was named after him in 1901.
