= James Sibree Anderson =

American politician

James Sibree Anderson (December 25, 1841 – May 9, 1927) was a member of the Wisconsin State Assembly.

== Biography ==
Anderson was born on December 25, 1841, in Kelvin Haugh, now part of Glasgow, Scotland. He moved to what is now Kossuth, Wisconsin in 1852 and later to Manitowoc, Wisconsin. During the American Civil War, he served with the 5th Wisconsin Volunteer Infantry Regiment of the Union Army, achieving the rank of sergeant. In 1870, Anderson graduated from Lawrence University.

On July 17, 1873, Anderson married Eva M. Mills, daughter of Joseph Trotter Mills. They had two children. Anderson died on May 9, 1927.

== Political career ==
Anderson was a member of the Assembly from 1889 to 1890. Other positions he held include alderman and city attorney of Manitowoc and county judge of Manitowoc County, Wisconsin. He was a Republican.
