= Joseph Trotter Mills =

American politician (1812–1897)

The Honorable Joseph T. Mills
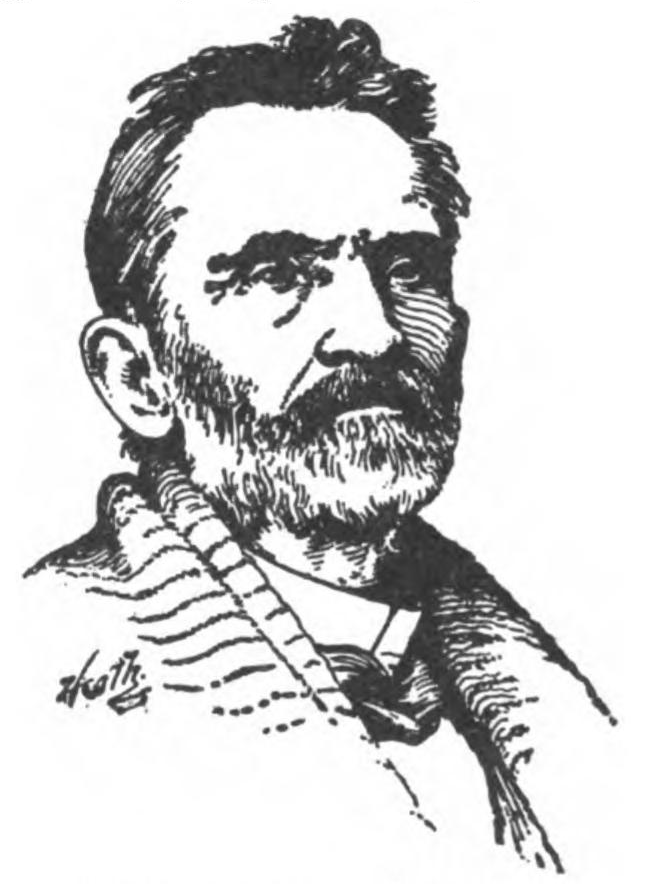
- Portrait from History of Grant County Wisconsin (1900)

Wisconsin Circuit Court Judge for the 5th Circuit
- In office January 2, 1865 – January 1, 1877
- Preceded by: Montgomery M. Cothren
- Succeeded by: Montgomery M. Cothren

Member of the Wisconsin State Assembly
- In office January 6, 1879 – January 5, 1880
- Preceded by: Thomas J. Graham
- Succeeded by: John A. Klindt
- Constituency: Grant 2nd district
- In office January 6, 1862 – January 5, 1863
- Preceded by: Hanmer Robbins
- Succeeded by: J. Allen Barber
- Constituency: Grant 3rd district
- In office January 7, 1856 – January 4, 1858
- Preceded by: William W. Field
- Succeeded by: Charles K. Dean
- Constituency: Grant 4th district

District Attorney of Grant County, Wisconsin
- In office August 1861 – Summer 1864
- Appointed by: Alexander Randall
- Preceded by: Allen R. Bushnell
- Succeeded by: Allen R. Bushnell
- In office January 3, 1859 – January 7, 1861
- Preceded by: Edward D. Lowry
- Succeeded by: Allen R. Bushnell

Personal details
- Born: December 18, 1812 Cane Ridge, Kentucky, U.S.
- Died: November 22, 1897 (aged 84) Denver County, Colorado, U.S.
- Resting place: Hillside Cemetery, Lancaster, Wisconsin
- Party: Republican
- Spouses: Evalina Warner (died 1841); Rebecca Warner (m. 1842; died 1857); Mary Ann Coumbe (m. 1860; died 1893)
- Children: Mary Evelina Warner Mills^{(b. 1844; died 1845)}; Evalina (Anderson)^{(b. 1846; died 1930)}; Jared Warner Mills^{(b. 1852; died 1907)}; Benjamin Mills^{(b. 1857; died 1858)}
- Relatives: Benjamin Mills (uncle)

Joseph Trotter Mills (December 18, 1812 – November 22, 1897) was an American attorney, jurist, Republican politician, and Wisconsin pioneer. He served four one-year terms in the Wisconsin State Assembly, and was Wisconsin circuit court judge for the 5th circuit from 1865 through 1877.

== Biography ==
Born in 1812 in Cane Ridge, Kentucky, near Paris, Joseph Trotter Mills as a youth lived and studied with his uncle Benjamin Mills, who was a judge of the Kentucky Court of Appeals. Moving west, in 1831 Mills studied at Illinois College in Jacksonville, Illinois.

He worked as a tutor in 1834 and 1835, teaching the children of Colonel Zachary Taylor, then commanding officer of Fort Crawford, Prairie du Chien, Michigan Territory. Later Mills married and had a family.

He prepared to change his work by reading the law with an established firm; in 1844, he was admitted to the Wisconsin bar. He practiced law in Lancaster, Wisconsin. From 1865 to 1877, Mills served as Wisconsin Circuit Court judge. In 1856, 1857, 1862, and 1879, Mills served in the Wisconsin State Assembly as a Republican. His son-in-law, James Sibree Anderson, was also a member of the Assembly.

Mills died at his son's home in Denver, Colorado.

Wisconsin State Assembly
Preceded by William W. Field	Member of the Wisconsin State Assembly from the Grant 4th district January 7, 1856 – January 4, 1858	Succeeded by Charles K. Dean
Preceded by Hanmer Robbins	Member of the Wisconsin State Assembly from the Grant 3rd district January 6, 1862 – January 5, 1863	Succeeded by J. Allen Barber
Preceded by Thomas J. Graham	Member of the Wisconsin State Assembly from the Grant 2nd district January 6, 1879 – January 5, 1880	Succeeded by John A. Klindt
Legal offices
Preceded by Edward D. Lowry	District Attorney of Grant County, Wisconsin; January 3, 1859 – January 7, 1861	Succeeded by Allen R. Bushnell
Preceded by Allen R. Bushnell	District Attorney of Grant County, Wisconsin; August 1861 – Summer 1864	Succeeded by Allen R. Bushnell
Preceded by Montgomery M. Cothren	Wisconsin Circuit Court Judge for the 5th Circuit; January 2, 1865 – January 1, 1877	Succeeded by Montgomery M. Cothren
