= William Francis Bailey =

American politician and judge (1842–1915)

William F. Bailey

Wisconsin Circuit Court Judge for the 17th circuit
- In office January 4, 1892 – January 3, 1898
- Preceded by: Position established
- Succeeded by: James O'Neill

6th & 10th Mayor of Eau Claire, Wisconsin
- In office April 1882 – April 1884
- Preceded by: E. T. Farr
- Succeeded by: Henry D. Davis
- In office April 1877 – April 1878
- Preceded by: Levi M. Vilas
- Succeeded by: George W. Chapman

District Attorney of Eau Claire County, Wisconsin
- In office January 5, 1874 – January 4, 1876
- Preceded by: Texas Angel
- Succeeded by: Loren Edwards

Personal details
- Born: June 20, 1842 Carmel, New York, U.S.
- Died: April 5, 1915 (aged 72) Eau Claire, Wisconsin, U.S.
- Resting place: Oakwood Cemetery, Fremont, Ohio
- Party: Democratic
- Spouses: Mercy S. Cole (m. 1864; died 1882); Frances J. Gillett (m. 1883–1915)
- Children: William Francis Bailey Jr.; (b. 1884; died 1938)

Military service
- Allegiance: United States
- Branch/service: United States Volunteers; Union Army
- Rank: Captain, USV
- Unit: 38th Reg. N.Y. Vol. Infantry; 95th Reg. N.Y. Vol. Infantry
- Battles/wars: American Civil War

William Francis Bailey Sr. (June 20, 1842 – April 5, 1915) was an American lawyer, jurist, Democratic politician, and Wisconsin pioneer. He was the 6th and 10th mayor of Eau Claire, Wisconsin, and served six years as a Wisconsin circuit court judge. During the American Civil War, he served as a Union Army officer in the New York volunteer infantry.

== Early life ==
Bailey was born on June 20, 1842, in Carmel, New York, son of Benamin Bailey, a lawyer. Bailey came to Eau Claire in 1867 at the age of 25.

== Career ==
During the American Civil War, he served with the Union Army, enlisting as a corporal with the 38th New York Infantry Regiment, he was later commissioned as a captain in the 95th New York Infantry Regiment.

After serving as district attorney of Eau Claire County, Wisconsin, Bailey served as the sixth and tenth mayor of Eau Claire, elected in 1877, 1882, and 1883. In 1890, he was a candidate for the United States House of Representatives from Wisconsin's 8th congressional district. He lost to incumbent Nils P. Haugen. Bailey later served as a Wisconsin circuit court judge for the 17th circuit from 1892 to 1898. He was a Democrat.

== Personal life ==
He married twice. His first wife, Mercy, died in 1882. Bailey's second wife, Frances, died in 1943.

== Electoral history ==
=== Wisconsin Circuit Court (1876) ===
Wisconsin Circuit Court, 11th Circuit Election, 1876
Party	Candidate	Votes	%	±%
General Election, April 4, 1876
Nonpartisan	Henry D. Barron	2,673	53.50%	
Nonpartisan	William F. Bailey	1,363	27.28%	
Nonpartisan	Solon H. Clough	960	19.22%	
Plurality		1,310	26.22%	
Total votes		4,996	100.0%	

=== U.S. House of Representatives (1890) ===
Wisconsin's 8th Congressional District Election, 1890
Party	Candidate	Votes	%	±%
General Election, November 4, 1890
Republican	Nils P. Haugen (incumbent)	17,609	49.21%	−7.81%
Democratic	William F. Bailey	15,261	42.65%	+7.74%
Prohibition	W. C. Jones	2,911	8.14%	+0.32%
Plurality		2,348	6.56%	-15.55%
Total votes		35,781	100.0%	-24.18%
Republican hold				

=== Wisconsin Circuit Court (1891, 1897) ===
Wisconsin Circuit Court, 17th Circuit Election, 1891
Party	Candidate	Votes	%	±%
General Election, April 7, 1891
Nonpartisan	William F. Bailey	4,687	52.94%	
Nonpartisan	James O'Neill	4,166	47.06%	
Plurality		521	5.89%	
Total votes		8,853	100.0%	

Wisconsin Circuit Court, 17th Circuit Election, 1897
Party	Candidate	Votes	%	±%
General Election, April 6, 1897
Nonpartisan	James O'Neill	7,726	67.71%	+20.66%
Nonpartisan	William F. Bailey (incumbent)	2,314	20.28%	−32.66%
Nonpartisan	F. M. Miner	1,370	12.01%	
Plurality		5,412	47.43%	+41.55%
Total votes		11,410	100.0%	+28.88%

Political offices
Preceded by Levi M. Vilas	Mayor of Eau Claire, Wisconsin; April 1877 – April 1878	Succeeded by George W. Chapman
Preceded by E. T. Farr	Mayor of Eau Claire, Wisconsin; April 1882 – April 1884	Succeeded by Henry D. Davis
Legal offices
Preceded by Texas Angel	District Attorney of Eau Claire County, Wisconsin; January 5, 1874 – January 4, 1876	Succeeded by Loren Edwards
New circuit established	Wisconsin Circuit Court Judge for the 17th circuit January 4, 1892 – January 3, 1898	Succeeded by James O'Neill
