= Yeoman (surname) =

Yeoman is an English surname derived from "yeoman". Guppy reported it from Yorkshire and Somerset.

It may refer to:

- Bill Yeoman (1927–2020), American college football player and coach
- David Yeoman (born 1944), Welsh Anglican bishop
- Henry Yeoman (1816–1897), English archdeacon
- Louise Yeoman (born 1968), Scottish historian and broadcaster
- Martin Yeoman (born 1953), English painter and draughtsman, known for drawings of the British Royal Family
- Owain Yeoman (born 1978), Welsh actor
- Ray Yeoman (1934–2004), Scottish football player and manager
- Richard S. Yeoman (1904–1988), American commercial artist and numismatist
- Richard Yeoman-Clark (1944–2019), British composer and sound engineer
- Robert Yeoman (born 1951), American cinematographer
- Thomas Yeoman (1709 or 1710–1782) English millwright, surveyor and civil engineer

== See also ==
- Yeoman (disambiguation)
- Yeomans (surname)
- Youmans (surname)
