= Arthur Gordon Tovey =

New Zealand artist, educationalist, writer (1901–1974)

Arthur Gordon Tovey (1901–1974) (known as Gordon Tovey) was a notable New Zealand artist, art teacher and administrator, educationalist, and writer.

== Biography ==
He was born in Wellington, New Zealand in 1901, the son of Arthur Oliver Tovey, a telegraphist, and Catherine Jane (Youmans) Tovey. His aunt was the painter Charlotte Youmans. He studied art at Wellington Technical College.

He started exhibiting in 1922, and in 1924 he took a job as an artist with the Railways Advertising Branch. This work took him to London, where some of his posters for the Southern Railway Posters won praise. In 1930, following his marriage, he moved back to New Zealand, and two years later he began teaching art at the Dunedin School of Art at King Edward Technical College. He rose to be head of the school in 1937 and became known for innovative programs integrating the visual and performing arts. His students in this period included Colin McCahon and Doris Lusk.

During World War II, he worked on camouflage. In 1943, he became a full-time art lecturer at Dunedin Training College, where he again introduced educational innovations. Tovey had been inspired to cultivate a new Secondary Art Scheme by the La Trobe scheme of the 1920s and Herbert Read's book Education Through Art, aiming to further develop art education in New Zealand. In 1946, he was appointed the first supervisor of art and craft for the Wellington Department of Education. He was particularly interested in fostering understanding of, and education in, Maori arts, crafts, music, and mythology, and he wrote two books on these subjects, Art and Craft for the South Pacific (1959) and The arts of the Maori (1961).

He retired in 1966, returning to painting and writing full-time. During this period, he published an epic poem, The Twice Born Seed. He died in Wellington.

== Personal life ==
In 1930, he married London-born Heather Campbell, and they had one child. She had been secretly fostered, with no birth registration, and discovered only late in life that her parents were Grace Blundell Maple (sole heir to the Maple Furnishing millions) and Elidor Campbell, a son of the third Earl of Cawdor.
