= Popular Science Italia =

Italian-language edition of Popular Science magazine

Cover

Popular Science Italia is the Italian language edition of the American magazine Popular Science. It has been published in Rome, Italy, since 2014 by Kekoa Publishing under the direction of Francesco Maria Avitto.
