= Eoman =

Eoman may refer to:

- Eoman people, an ethnic group of Australia
- Eoman language, a language of Australia

== See also ==
- Yeoman (disambiguation)
