= Alvin S. Trow =

American politician

Alvin S. Trow (15 September 1838 – 9 September 1909) was a member of the Wisconsin State Assembly for a term.

== Biography ==
Trow was born on September 15, 1838, in what would become Walworth, Wisconsin. Pursuits he followed include steamboat, lumber and flour mercantile businesses, along with dairy and cranberry farming. On January 22, 1865, Trow married Sarah J. Knapp. He died on September 9, 1909, in Battle Creek, Michigan. Trow, Wisconsin was named after him.

== Political career ==
Trow lived in Merrillan and was elected to the Assembly from the 7th District of Jackson County, Wisconsin in 1880. Additionally, he chaired the county board of Winnebago County, Wisconsin.
