= William Jay Youmans =

American physician

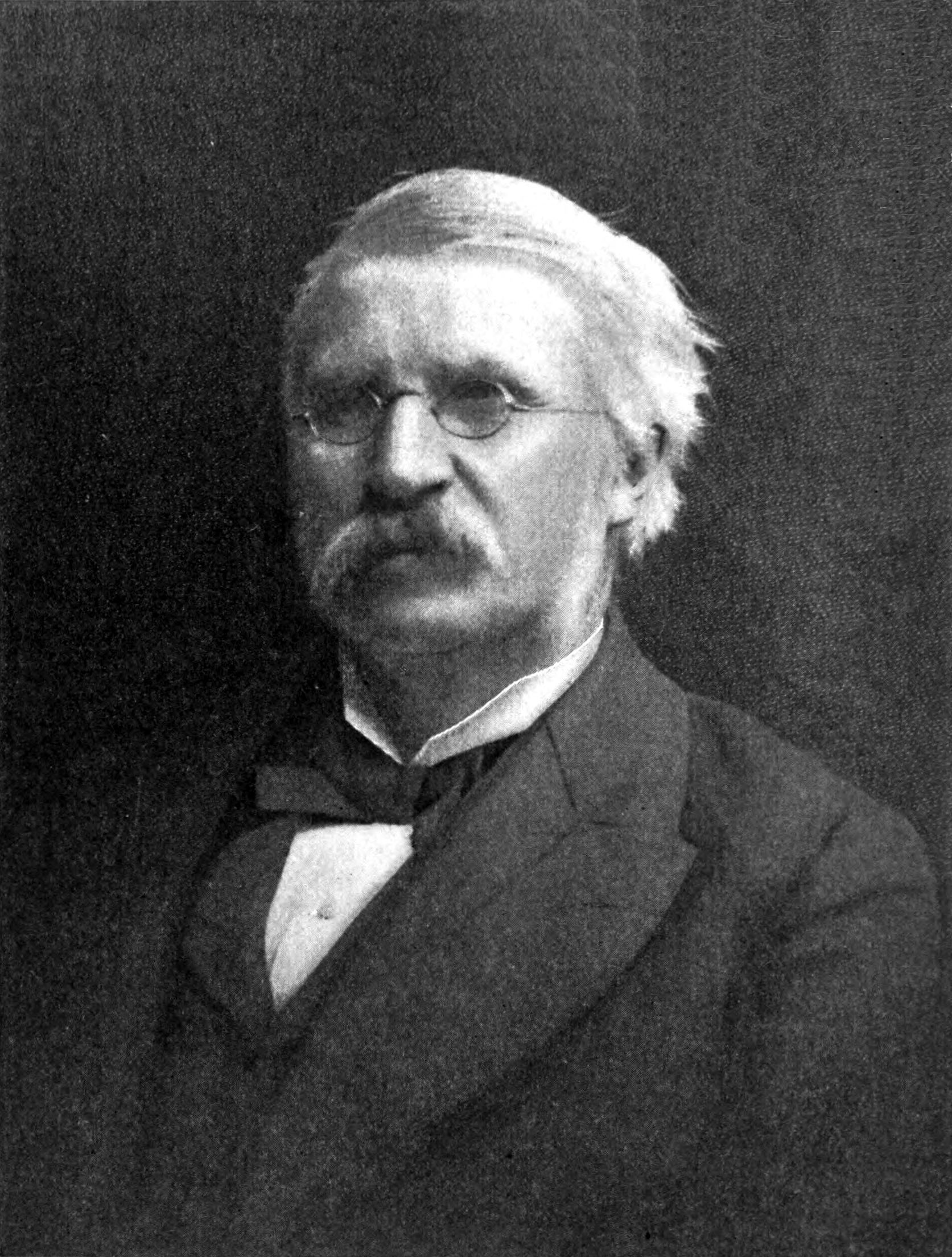
- Born: October 14, 1838; Milton, New York, U.S.
- Died: April 10, 1901 (aged 62); Mount Vernon, New York, U.S.
- Education: Columbia College; Yale University
- Spouse: Celia Greene (after 1866)
- Children: 4
- Relatives: Edward L. Youmans (brother); Eliza Ann Youmans (sister)

William Jay Youmans (October 14, 1838 – April 10, 1901) was an American scientist. He edited Popular Science Monthly for a time.

== Early life ==
He was born at Milton, New York. He was the son of Vincent Youmans and Catherine (née Scofield) Youmans. He worked on his father's farm and studied at the local school until he was 17.

He studied chemistry under his brother, Edward Livingston Youmans, and at Columbia and Yale, and studied natural history with Asa Fitch. He then took a course in medicine at New York University, and in 1865 studied natural history under biologist Thomas Henry Huxley in London.

== Career ==
On his return to the United States, Youmans settled at Winona, Minnesota, and practiced medicine for about three years.

In 1872, he abandoned his medical practice to assist his brother in establishing the Popular Science Monthly, and subsequently was associated in editing. After his brother's death in 1887, he became its editor-in-chief, remaining in that position until 1900.

He was a member of the American Association for the Advancement of Science.

== Personal life ==
Youmans was married to Celia Greene of Gailway, New York, in 1866. Together, they had four children, including Dr. Vincent D. Youmans, Mary Youmans, Dr. Alice C. Youmans, and Edward Youmans.

Youmans died of typhoid fever at his home in Mount Vernon, New York.

== Published works ==
He contributed occasionally to the pages of Popular Science Monthly under his own name, and for many years prepared the articles on chemistry, metallurgy, and physiology for Appletons' Annual Cyclopædia. He edited Huxley's 1866 work Lessons in Elementary Physiology, to which he added seven chapters on hygiene, and it became the 1868 work Elements of Physiology and Hygiene. He wrote Pioneers of Science in America (1895).
