= Eliza Ann Youmans =

American botanist

Eliza Ann Youmans (born in Greenfield, New York, 17 December 1826; died in Winona, Minnesota, 27 September 1914) wrote books, mainly on botanical subjects.

== Biography ==
She was the daughter of Vincent Youmans and Catherine (Scofield) Youmans. Her brother Edward L. Youmans suffered from an eye ailment, and she read to him and performed chemistry experiments in order to assist him in his studies of chemistry. To further her usefulness as a tutor, in 1843 she attended classes in chemistry given by William Mather in Fairfield, New York. Later in New York City, with the same purpose in mind, she studied agricultural chemistry in the laboratory of Thomas Antisell.

Her studies and tutoring stimulated her own interest in science, and her fondness for children led her to apply her knowledge to early education. She published First Book of Botany, designed to Cultivate the Observing Powers of Children (New York, 1870) and Second Book of Botany (1873). These were intended to promote the systematic study of plants as objects in place of the object lessons in general use. She prepared an enlarged edition of Henslow's Botanical Charts (1873), translated from the French Quatrefages' Natural History of Man (1875), and contributed to the Popular Science Monthly and other periodicals. Youmans also published Descriptive Botany, a Guide to the Classification of Plants, with a Popular Flora (1885), and an abridgment of Bentley's Physiological Botany, as a sequel (1886).
