= William P. Bartlett =

American politician

William Pitt Bartlett (September 13, 1829 – March 16, 1917) was an American politician, judge, and lawyer.

Born in Minot, Maine, Bartlett graduated from Waterville College in 1853. He taught school in Maine and was involved in the lumber industry. In 1855, Bartlett moved to Watertown, Wisconsin. He again taught school and studied law. In 1856, Bartlett was admitted to the Wisconsin bar. In 1857, Bartlett moved to Bartlett and continued to practiced law. He served on the school and served as district attorney for Eau Claire County, Wisconsin. Bartlett also served as county judge. He served on the Eau Claire Common Council. In 1860 and 1873, Bartlett served in the Wisconsin State Assembly and was a Republican. In 1874, President Ulysses Grant appointed Bartlett to the office of the register of the United States Land Office. He also served on the Board of Regents for the University of Wisconsin. Bartlett died at his home in Eau Claire, Wisconsin.
