= Lee Columbus Yeomans =

American politician

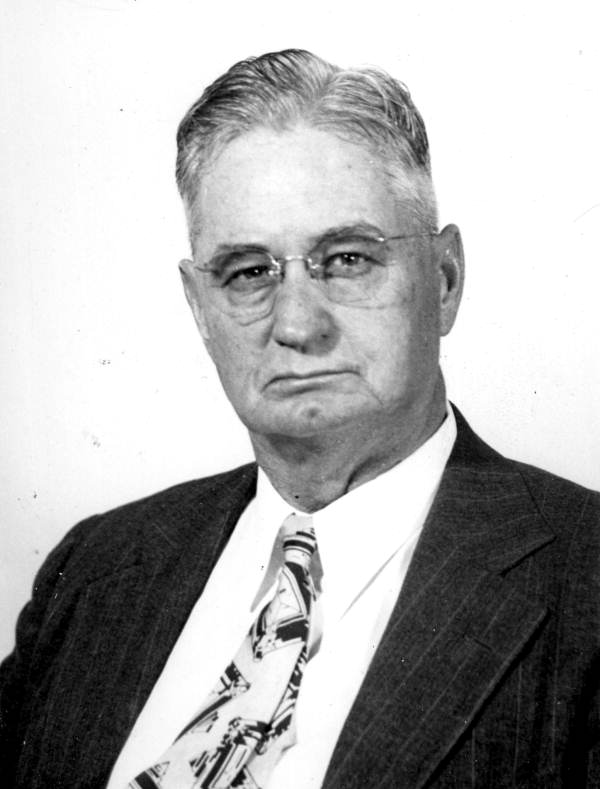
- Yeomans in the 1940s

Member of the Florida House of Representatives from Citrus County
- In office 1945–1949

Personal details
- Born: November 26, 1892 Glennville, Georgia, U.S.
- Died: September 9, 1951 (aged 58)
- Party: Democratic

Lee Columbus Yeomans (November 26, 1892 – September 9, 1951) was an American politician. He served as a Democratic member of the Florida House of Representatives.

== Life and career ==
Yeomans was born in Glennville, Georgia.

Yeomans served in the Florida House of Representatives from 1945 to 1949.

Yeomans died on September 9, 1951, at the age of 58.
