= Edward L. Youmans =

United States science writer and editor

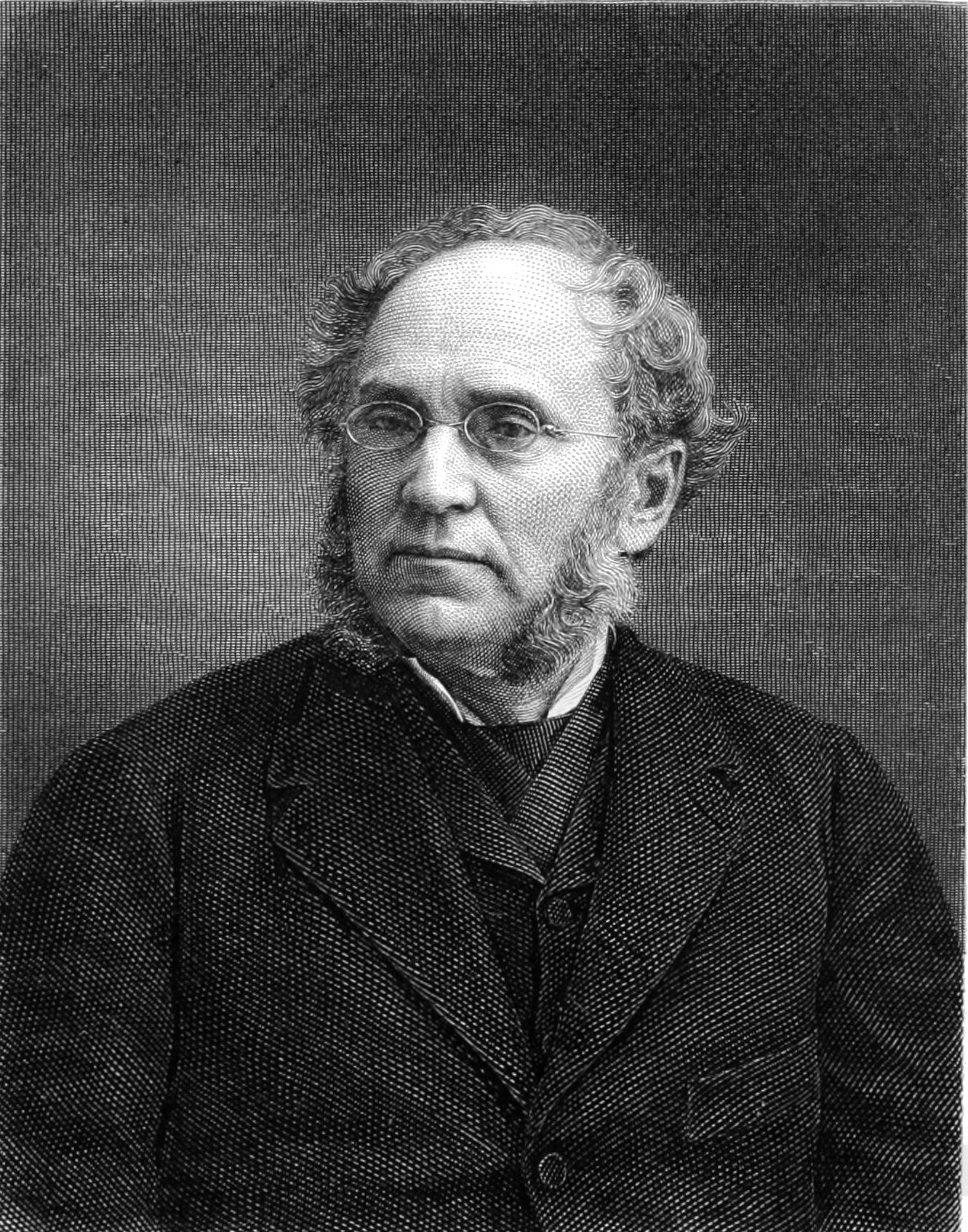
- Born: Edward Livingston Youmans; June 3, 1821; Coeymans, New York, U.S.
- Died: January 18, 1887 (aged 65); New York City, New York, U.S.
- Education: University of Vermont
- Spouse: Catherine Newton Lee (m. 1861)
- Relatives: William Jay Youmans (brother); Eliza Ann Youmans (sister)

Signature
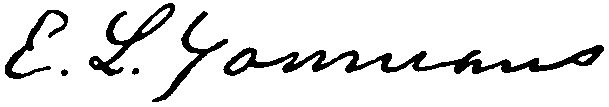

Edward Livingston Youmans (June 3, 1821 – January 18, 1887) was an American scientific writer, editor, and lecturer and founder of Popular Science magazine.

== Early life ==
Youmans was the son of Vincent Youmans and Catherine (née Scofield) Youmans. He grew up in Saratoga County where his parents had moved during his early years. His father was a mechanic and a farmer; his mother was a teacher. His brother, William Jay Youmans, helped him found and edit Popular Science Monthly, and on Edward's death his brother became editor-in-chief. His sister Eliza Ann Youmans, in addition to being of great help to Edward in dealing with his blindness, was a science writer herself, chiefly on botanical subjects.

He attended the common school in Saratoga County. At 13 years old, he was afflicted with ophthalmia, which affected his vision throughout the remainder of his life. When he was 17, he became practically blind, and remained so until he was about 30. He very rarely had vision enough to read ordinary type.

== Career ==
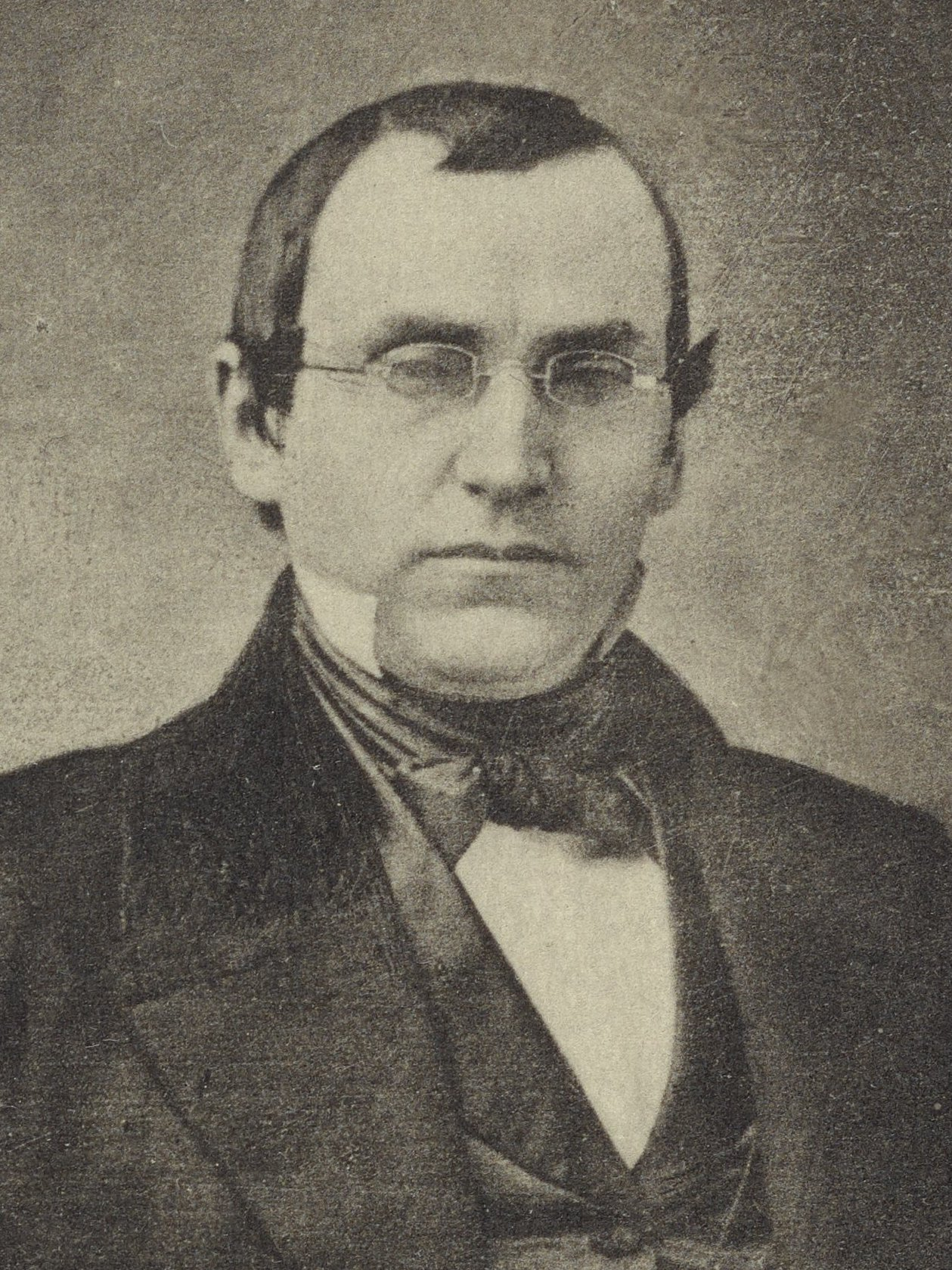
At age 30, Portrait of Edward Livingston Youmans

Youmans went to New York City in 1840 for treatment of his eye problem. After some time in an infirmary, he boarded with printers who read to him from the latest works. Finally he found a home with a Quaker family, where he resided for many years. In New York, he got to know Horace Greeley, Walt Whitman, and William Henry Appleton.

In 1845, his sister, Eliza Ann Youmans, became his reader and amanuensis, and with her aid he undertook the study of chemistry and physics. In 1851, while studying agricultural chemistry, he prepared a Chemical Chart which won such favor that the next year he published a Class-Book of Chemistry. From that time on, he devoted himself to popularizing science. He studied medicine during this period and received the degree of M.D. from the University of Vermont.

He started lecturing on science in 1852, and for the next 17 years he gave courses of lectures in connection with the lyceum system in many towns and cities, awakening deep interest in scientific subjects. In his lectures on the "Chemistry of the Sunbeam" and the "Dynamics of Life", he was the first to expound popularly the doctrines of the conservation of energy and the mutual relation of forces.

After his marriage in 1861, his wife's literary abilities were put to use in Youmans' editorial and promotional activities. Early on Youmans became deeply interested in the diffusion of standard scientific works in the United States, particularly those on evolution philosophy. He republished such works in the United States, and did all he could through the newspaper and periodical press to make them known to the public. Herbert Spencer's books alone, on behalf of which he spared no effort, reached a sale of 132,000 copies by 1890, and the foreign authors whose works he used for years enjoyed, by voluntary arrangement with the D. Appleton & Company, the benefits of international copyright, of the justice and need of which Youmans was from the beginning of his literary life an ardent advocate.

=== International Scientific Series ===
Youmans started the "International Scientific Series" in 1871, by means of which works by the greatest scientists of all nations were published simultaneously in the principal modern languages. Arrangements were made for the publication of works in New York, London, Paris, and Leipzig, and afterward in St. Petersburg and Milan. The project was based on the idea of payment to authors from the sale in all countries. By 1888, the series had reached its 64th volume.

=== Popular Science ===
In 1872, Youmans founded Popular Science Monthly magazine, which he edited until his death. The 28 volumes issued under his care show a devotion to the spread of scientific thought upon the chief topics of the time. His enthusiastic nature led to constant overdoing, and the strain affected his strength years before his death. From 1882, his lungs were seriously affected, but he worked on persistently until early in 1886.

In 1882, Youmans organized the New York banquet at the end of Herbert Spencer's U.S. tour. All told, Spencer wrote 91 articles for Popular Science Monthly.

== Personal life ==
On November 4, 1861, in Saratoga, New York, he married Catherine Newton "Kate" Lee (c. 1819–1894), widow of William Little Lee, the first Chief Justice of the Supreme Court of the Kingdom of Hawaii. They didn't have any children.

Youmans died on January 18, 1887, in New York City.

== Publications ==
- Brief explanations of a new chart of chemistry: Upon which the fundamental principles of the science ... are represented to the eye by diagrams and colors in the clearest manner (1850)
- Alcohol and the constitution of man;: Being a scientific account of the chemical properties of alcohol, and its leading effects upon the healthy human constitution (1854)
- Chemical atlas; Or, The chemistry of familiar objects (1856)
- Handbook of household science: A popular account of heat, light, air, aliment, & cleansing in their scientific principles & domestic application (1857)
- A class-book of chemistry: In which the principles of the science are familiarly explained and applied to the arts, agriculture, physiology, dietetics ...(1859)
- The correlation and conservation of forces: A series of expositions by Prof. Grove ... (1867)
- The culture demanded by modern life: A series of addresses and arguments on the claims of scientific education (1867)
- Observations on the scientific study of human nature: A lecture delivered before the London College of Preceptors, October 10, 1866 (1867)
- The scientific basis of prohibition (1871)
- Herbert Spencer on the Americans and the Americans on Herbert Spencer: Being a full report of his interview, and of the proceedings of the farewell banquet of Nov. 11, 1882 (1883)
