= Popular Science =

American popular science website

- General Manager: Adam Morath
- Categories: Interdisciplinary
- Frequency: Fully digital
- Total circulation: 1,321,075 (June 2014)
- Founded: May 1872; 154 years ago (as The Popular Science Monthly)
- Final issue: April 27, 2021 (print)
- Company: Recurrent Ventures
- Country: United States
- Based in: New York, New York
- Website: popsci.com
- ISSN: 0161-7370
- OCLC: 488612811

Popular Science (also known as PopSci) is an American popular science website, covering science and technology topics geared toward general readers. Its print magazine, which ran from 1872 to 2020, was translated into over 30 languages and distributed to at least 45 countries. In 2021, Popular Science switched to an all-digital format and abandoned the magazine format in 2023.

Popular Science has won over 58 awards, including the American Society of Magazine Editors awards for its journalistic excellence in 2003 (for General Excellence), 2004 (for Best Magazine Section), and 2019 (for Single-Topic Issue).

== Magazine history ==
=== The Popular Science Monthly ===
The Popular Science Monthly, as the publication was originally called, was founded in May 1872 by Edward L. Youmans and published by D. Appleton & Company to disseminate scientific knowledge to the educated layman. Youmans had previously worked as an editor for the weekly Appleton's Journal and persuaded them to publish his new journal.

Early issues were mostly reprints of English periodicals. The journal became an outlet for writings and ideas of Charles Darwin, Thomas Henry Huxley, Louis Pasteur, Henry Ward Beecher, Charles Sanders Peirce, William James, Thomas Edison, John Dewey, John Shaw Billings, and James McKeen Cattell.

William Jay Youmans, Edward's brother, who helped found the magazine, served as an editor as well. He became editor-in-chief on Edward's death in 1887.

In 1900, D. Appleton & Company was forced to sell the journal for economic reasons to James McKeen Cattell. Cattell, who served as editor and publisher, had a background in academics and continued publishing articles for educated readers.

=== Modern Publishing Company ===
By 1915, the readership was declining and publishing a science journal was a financial challenge. In a September 1915 editorial, Cattell related these difficulties to his readers and announced that the Popular Science Monthly name had been transferred to the Modern Publishing Company to start a new publication for general audiences. The existing academic journal would continue publishing under the name The Scientific Monthly, retaining existing subscribers. Scientific Monthly was published until 1958 when it was absorbed into Science.

After acquiring the Electrician and Mechanic magazine in 1914, the Modern Publishing Company had merged it with Modern Electrics to become Modern Electrics & Mechanics. In 1915, the publication was merged with Popular Electricity and World's Advance to form Popular Electricity and Modern Mechanics. After further name changes that caused confusion among librarians, the Modern Publishing Company purchased the Popular Science Monthly name to provide a clear signifier of the publication's focus on popular science. It took up the Popular Science naming starting with the November issue.

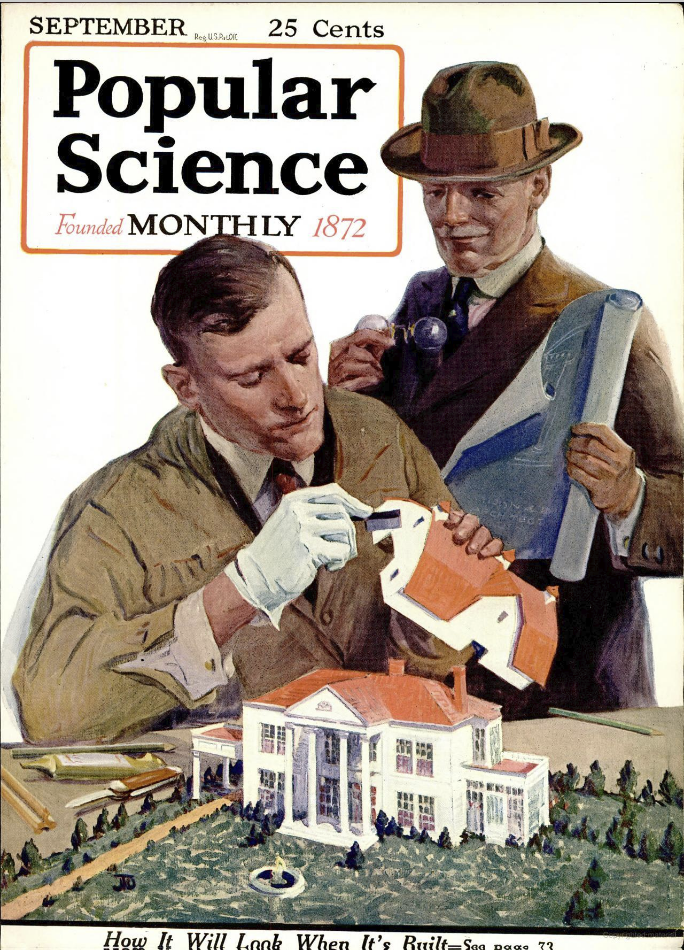
September 1920 volume

The October 1915 issue was titled Popular Science Monthly and World's Advance. The volume number (Vol. 87, No. 4) was that of Popular Science but the content was that of World's Advance. The new editor was Waldemar Kaempffert, a former editor of Scientific American.

The change in Popular Science Monthly was dramatic. The old version was a scholarly journal that had eight to ten articles in a 100-page issue. There would be ten to twenty photographs or illustrations. The new version had hundreds of short, easy to read articles with hundreds of illustrations. Editor Kaempffert was writing for "the home craftsman and hobbyist who wanted to know something about the world of science." The circulation doubled in the first year.

From the 1920s until 1970 the magazine featured fictional stories of Gus Wilson's Model Garage, centered on car problems.

An annual review of changes to the new model year cars ran in 1940 and 1941, but did not return after the war until 1954. It continued until the mid-1970s when the magazine reverted to publishing the new models over multiple issues as information became available.

From July 1952 to December 1989, Popular Science carried Roy Doty's Wordless Workshop as a regular feature.

=== Times Mirror ===
The Popular Science Publishing Company was acquired in 1967 by the Los Angeles–based Times Mirror Company.

From July 1969 to May 1989, the cover and table of contents carried the subtitle, "The What's New Magazine." The cover removed the subtitle the following month and the contents page removed it in February 1990. In 1983, the magazine introduced a new logo using the ITC Avant Garde font, which it used until late 1995. Within the next 11 years, its font changed four times (in 1995, 1997, 2001, and 2002, respectively).

In 1972, the magazine celebrated its 100 anniversary. By this time, it had a circulation of 1,625,000 and a readership that was 98% male.

In 1999, Popular Science launched its popsci.com website.

=== Tribune, Time, and Bonnier ===
In 2000, Times Mirror merged with the Chicago-based Tribune Company. Times Mirror Magazines, including Popular Science, was then sold to Time Inc. (then a subsidiary of Time Warner).

By 2003, Popular Science was the top-selling science magazine in the United States with nearly 1.5 million a month.

On January 25, 2007, Time Warner sold the publication, along with 17 other parenting and special interest magazines to Bonnier Magazine Group.

In July 2007, Popular Science launched the Popular Science Predictions EXchange (PPX) prediction market. People were able to place virtual bets on what the next innovations in technology, the environment, and science would be. Bets have included whether Facebook would have an initial public offering by 2008, when a touchscreen iPod would be launched, and whether Dongtan, China's eco-city, would be inhabited by 2010. The PPX was shut down in May 2009 after two years of operation.

In 2009, the magazine used a new font for its logo, which was used until the January 2014 issue.

In July 2009, the cover of Popular Science used augmented reality to make a windmill become 3D when held up to a webcam and move when blowing into a microphone. The cover was sponsored by General Electric.

In early 2010, Bonnier partnered with London-based design firm BERG to create Mag+, a magazine publishing platform for tablets. In April 2010, Popular Science+, the first title on the Mag+ platform, launched in the iTunes Store the same day the iPad launched. An Android version was introduced in January 2011.

On March 27, 2011, Popular Science magazine sold the 10,000th subscription to its iPad edition, nearly six weeks after accepting Apple's terms for selling subs on its tablet.

In 2013, Popular Science disabled comments on its website, citing abusive behavior and an inability to offer proper moderation. At the end of the year, Cliff Ransom was promoted to editor-in-chief.

In 2014, the magazine underwent a major redesign; its February 2014 issue introduced a new logo, and a new format featuring greater use of graphics and imagery, aiming to broaden its content to appeal to wider attention to the environment, science, and technology among a mass audience. The revamp concluded in November 2014 with a redesign of the Popular Science website.

In January 2016, Popular Science switched to bi-monthly publication after 144 years of monthly publication. In April 2016 it was announced that editor-in-chief Cliff Ransom would be leaving the magazine. In August, Joe Brown was named Popular Science's new editor-in-chief. Brown set out to diversify the magazine's readership. By June 2018, women made up 25% of the editorial staff and 52% of its online readership.

Starting in September 2018, the magazine would become a quarterly publication. It teamed with USA Today to highlight science-supporting candidates ahead of the 2018 midterm elections. was nominated for several National Magazine Awards, winning for "The Tiny Issue" in 2019. By the end of 2019, circulation was at 630,000. Starting in 2020, Bonnier began licensing out the brand name for STEM toys, microscopes, and telescopes. Brown stepped down in February and was replaced by executive editor Corinne Iozzio in March.

The magazine was given a redesign, introducing a new table of contents, repositioning of the logo, revamping the layout, and adding new fonts to appeal to a younger audience.

=== Recurrent Ventures ===
On October 6, 2020, the Bonnier Group sold Popular Science and six other special interest magazines, including the well-known titles Popular Photography, Outdoor Life, and Field & Stream, to North Equity LLC. At the end of June 2020, the magazine's circulation had fallen to 560,000. In June 2021, North Equity introduced Recurrent Ventures as the new parent company to its digital media portfolio.

In 2021, the brand eliminated its print edition and became a digital-only publication. The digital edition became a quarterly release the following year. In August 2022, the digital subscription PopSci+ was introduced. For $12 per year, subscribers get access to the quarterly magazine, exclusive content, and an archive of past issues.

In May 2022, Popular Science celebrated its 150-year anniversary. It also won a 2022 National Magazine Award for its "Heat" issue, which took an in-depth look at the stark realities and ingenuity of a warming world.

In January 2023, Annie Colbert was named the new editor-in-chief. She joined the brand after spending more than 10 years at Mashable.

In November 2023, the digital edition of Popular Science was discontinued. PopSci+ was also discontinued and 13 staffers at the publication were laid off, leaving only five editorial employees on the brand.

=== Ziff Davis ===
In May 2026, Popular Science was acquired by Ziff Davis. Dwell, Domino, and Business of Home were also included in the deal.

== Media ==
=== Television & film ===
From 1935 to 1949, the magazine sponsored a series of short films, produced by Jerry Fairbanks and released by Paramount Pictures. In all, 72 10-minute shorts were developed. It also produced a series of filmstrips as part of the Living Together in the United States of America series in the 1940s.

In 1997, a TV show based on the magazine, hosted by Dean Stockwell, debuted on The Learning Channel.

Popular Science's Future Of... premiered on August 10, 2009, on the Science Channel. Hosted by Baratunde Thurston, each episode was concerned with the future of technology and science in a particular topic.

In March 2025, the brand partnered with Underknown and several science-based YouTube creators to introduce the Popular Science FAST streaming channel for Fubo, Plex, Sling Freestream, Vizio WatchFree+, Local Now, and other services. The channel became available on The Roku Channel in Canada starting in August.

=== Books ===
In the 1950s and '60s, Popular Science contained so-called "bonus booklets," which explained a particular subject and could torn out of the magazine. The May 1957 issue offered a 16-page guide on how to buy a car. In July 1957, the magazine included a supplemental insert on how to fix your car. The December 1965 issue had a booklet on color TVs.

Popular Science has published a number of books, including the bestselling Big Book of Hacks and Big Book of Maker Skills.

The brand has also published The Total Inventor's Manual and The Future Then, which was published in conjunction with the brand's 145th anniversary.

=== Radio and podcasts ===
Popular Science Radio was a partnership between Popular Science and Entertainment Radio Network which ran through 2016.

In 2018, Popular Science launched two podcasts, Last Week in Tech and The Weirdest Thing I Learned This Week. Last Week in Tech was later discontinued and replaced by Techathlon in February 2019.

The Weirdest Thing I Learned This Week proved to be a breakout success. By its second season, the podcast was averaging 35,000 weekly downloads and had inspired two live events.

In March 2021, the company launched its Ask Us Anything podcast. It's billed as a twice-weekly series that provides science-backed answers to questions. It was brought back in October 2025.

== Publishers ==
Companies publishing Popular Science, by time period
Dates	Publisher
1872–1900	D. Appleton & Company
1900–1901	McClure, Philips and Company
1901–1915	Science Press
1915–1924	Modern Publishing Company
1924–1967	Popular Science Publishing Company
1967–1973	Popular Science Publishing Company, subsidiary of Times Mirror
1973–2000	Times Mirror Company
2000–2007	Time Inc.
2007–2020	Bonnier Magazine Group
2020−present	North Equity

Sources: American Mass-Market Magazines The Wall Street Journal and New York Post.

== International ==
On September 24, 2008, Australian publishing company Australian Media Properties (part of the WW Media Group) launched a local version of Popular Science. It is a monthly magazine, like its American counterpart, and uses content from the American version of the magazine as well as local material. Australian Media Properties also launched www.popsci.com.au at the same time, a localised version of the Popular Science website.

In June 2014, Popular Science Italia was launched in Italy by Kekoa Publishing. Directed by Francesco Maria Avitto, the magazine is available in print and digital version.

In April 2017, Popular Science was launched in Arabic by United Arab Emirates-based publisher Haykal Media. The magazine is available in print bimonthly, and through a daily updated portal.

== Gallery ==
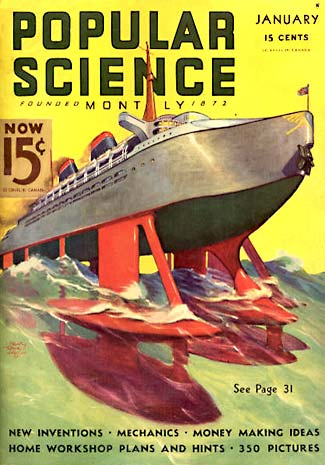
"Ship on Stilts Rides Above Waves", January 1936, by Edgar Franklin Wittmack

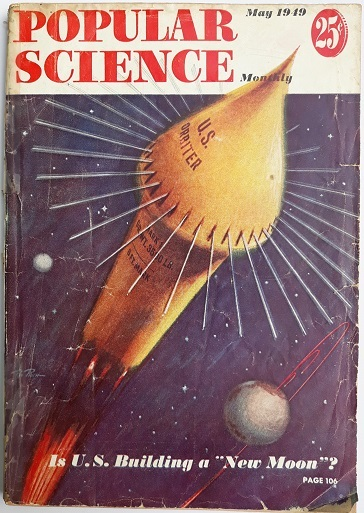
"Is U.S Building a 'New Moon'"?, May 1949

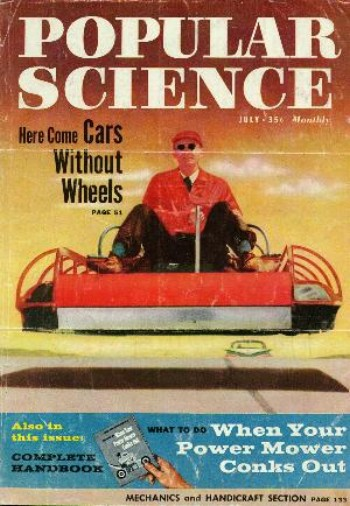
"Cars Without Wheels", July 1959

== See also ==
- Popular Mechanics
