= Robert Dewhurst =

English cricketer (1851–1924)

Robert Dewhurst (11 May 1851 – 13 October 1924) was an English cricketer active from 1872 to 1875 who played for Lancashire. He was born in Clitheroe and died in Blackpool. He appeared in 13 first-class matches as a righthanded batsman, scoring 266 runs with a highest score of 59, and held eight catches.
