= Charlotte Youmans =

New Zealand painter (1869–1957)

- Born: 14 April 1869
- Died: 12 June 1957 (aged 88)
- Relatives: Arthur Gordon Tovey (nephew)

Charlotte Beatrice Youmans (14 April 1869 – 12 June 1957) was a New Zealand painter of landscapes, interiors, and floral still lifes.

== Biography ==
Youmans was born in Wellington on 14 April 1869.

She was exhibiting by the mid 1890s and continued to do so through the 1920s. She exhibited at the New Zealand Academy of Fine Arts, Auckland Society of Arts, and elsewhere. Some of her work is in the collection of the National Library of New Zealand, including a watercolor of the interior of what is now known as Old St. Paul's in Wellington.

Youmans died on 12 June 1957 and her ashes were buried at Karori Cemetery.

The artist Arthur Gordon Tovey was her nephew. She was among the signatories to New Zealand's 1893 women's suffrage petition.
