= Dewhurst, Wisconsin =

- Town
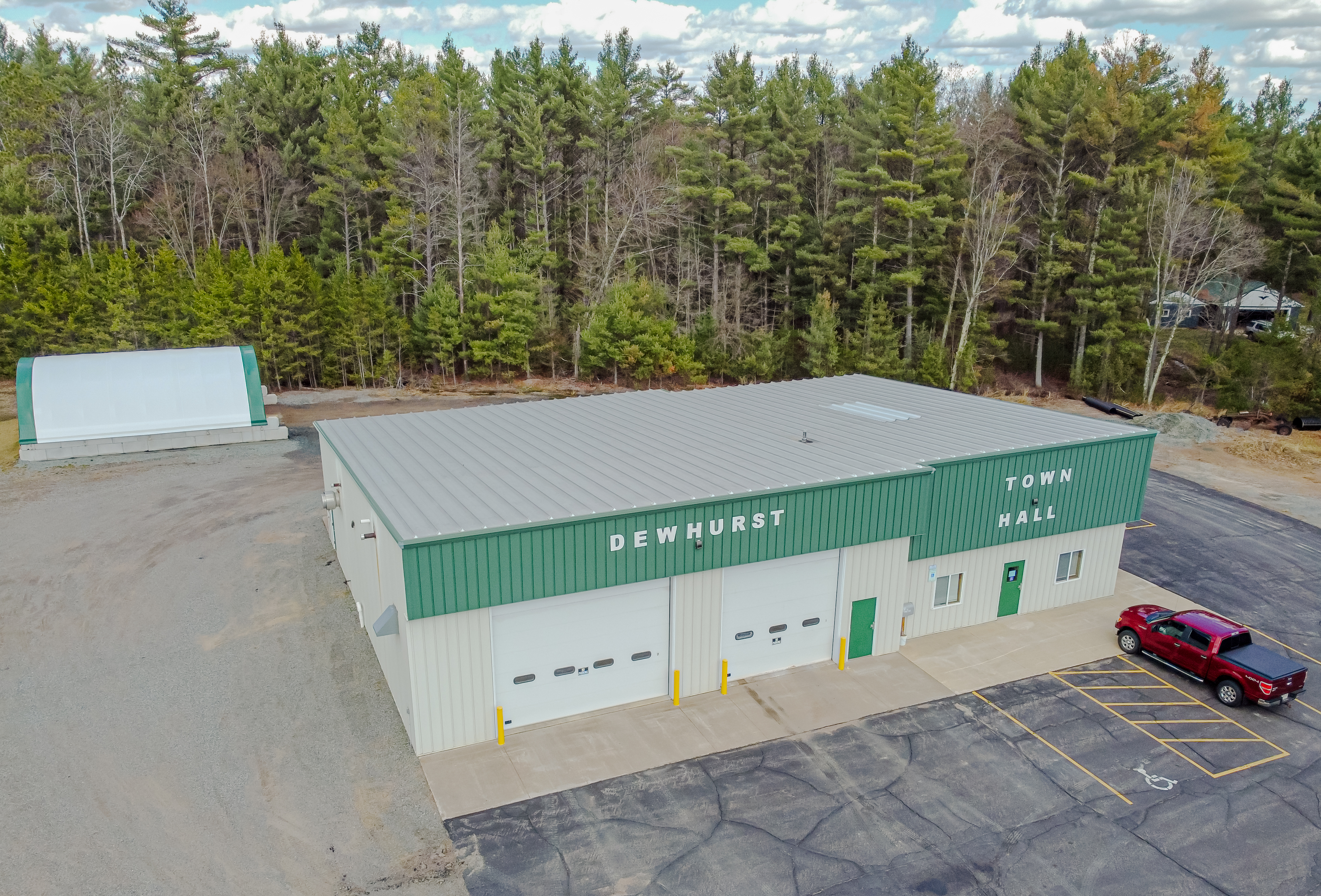
- Town hall

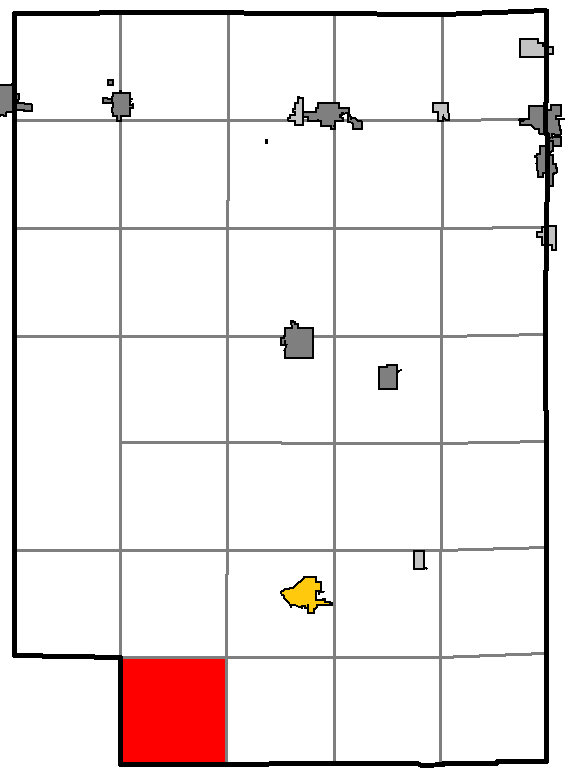
- Location of Dewhurst, Clark County

- Location of Clark County, Wisconsin
- Coordinates: 44°26′52″N 90°43′50″W
- Country: United States
- State: Wisconsin
- County: Clark

Area
  - Total: 36.1 sq mi (93.6 km^{2})
  - Land: 35.3 sq mi (91.3 km^{2})
  - Water: 0.89 sq mi (2.3 km^{2})
- Elevation: 958 ft (292 m)

Population (2020)
  - Total: 349
  - Density: 9.90/sq mi (3.82/km^{2})
- Time zone: UTC-6 (Central (CST))
  - Summer (DST): UTC-5 (CDT)
- Area codes: 715 & 534
- FIPS code: 55-20025
- GNIS feature ID: 1583082
- Website: https://townofdewhurstwi.gov/

Dewhurst is a town in Clark County in the U.S. state of Wisconsin. The population was 349 at the 2020 census. The ghost town of Trow was located in the town.

== History ==
The town was formed on November 15, 1901, and was originally named "Mound". However, the town was renamed in honor of Richard Dewhurst, a jurist and legislator. The first town meeting was held in April 1902.

== Geography ==
The town of Dewhurst is located in southwestern Clark County, bordered to the south and west by Jackson County. The Black River, a tributary of the Mississippi River, flows across the southeastern corner of the town; the northern half of Lake Arbutus, an impoundment on the river, is within the town. According to the United States Census Bureau, the town has a total area of 36.1 square miles (93.6 km^{2}), of which 35.3 square miles (91.3 km^{2}) is land and 0.89 square miles (2.3 km^{2}), or 2.44%, is water.

== Demographics ==
As of the census of 2000, there were 321 people, 156 households, and 97 families residing in the town. The population density was 9.1 people per square mile (3.5/km^{2}). There were 267 housing units at an average density of 7.5 per square mile (2.9/km^{2}). The racial makeup of the town was 88.47% White, 0.93% African American, 10.28% Native American, and 0.31% from two or more races. Hispanic or Latino of any race were 1.87% of the population.

There were 156 households, out of which 15.4% had children under the age of 18 living with them, 56.4% were married couples living together, 3.8% had a female householder with no husband present, and 37.2% were non-families. 32.7% of all households were made up of individuals, and 15.4% had someone living alone who was 65 years of age or older. The average household size was 2.06 and the average family size was 2.48.

In the town, the population was spread out, with 15.3% under the age of 18, 5.3% from 18 to 24, 20.6% from 25 to 44, 35.8% from 45 to 64, and 23.1% who were 65 years of age or older. The median age was 50 years. For every 100 females, there were 109.8 males. For every 100 females age 18 and over, there were 110.9 males.

The median income for a household in the town was $31,250, and the median income for a family was $38,125. Males had a median income of $28,438 versus $22,917 for females. The per capita income for the town was $20,696. About 2.1% of families and 6.7% of the population were below the poverty line, including none of those under age 18 and 7.1% of those age 65 or over.
