= Robert Bentley (botanist) =

British botanist (1821–1893)

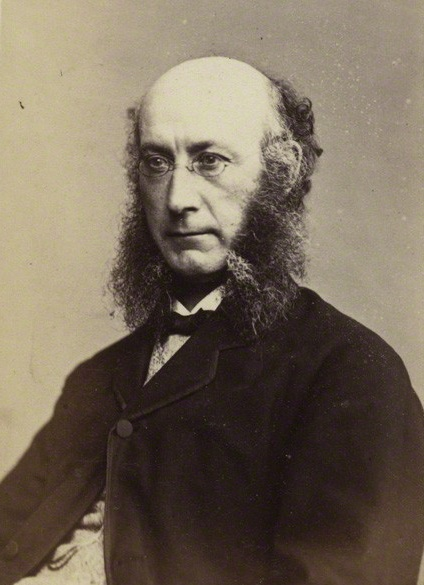
- Born: 25 March 1821; Hitchin, Hertfordshire, England
- Died: 24 December 1893 (aged 72); Kensington, England
- Education: King's College London
- Known for: Medicinal Plants (1880)
- Scientific career
- Fields: Botany
- Workplaces: Medical School of the London Hospital, King's College London
- Author abbrev. (botany): Bentley

Signature
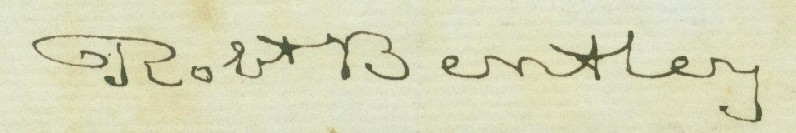

Robert Bentley (25 March 1821 – 24 December 1893) was an English botanist. He is perhaps best remembered today for the four-volume Medicinal Plants, published in 1880 with Henry Trimen and containing over three hundred hand-colored plates by botanist David Blair.

== Life ==
Robert Bentley was born in Hitchin, Hertfordshire in 1821. While apprenticed to a pharmacist in Tunbridge Wells, he developed an interest in botany. He subsequently studied medicine at King's College London, and became a Member of the Royal College of Surgeons in 1847 and a Fellow of the Linnean Society of London in 1849.

Bentley served as botany lecturer at the Medical School of the London Hospital, and in 1859 became Professor of Botany at King's College London.

In 1874, Bentley was elected a Fellow of the Royal Pharmaceutical Society of Great Britain, and he served as joint editor of the British Pharmacopeia of 1885.

Bentley died at his home in Warwick Road, Kensington, on 24 December 1893, and was buried at Kensal Green cemetery.

== Books by Bentley ==
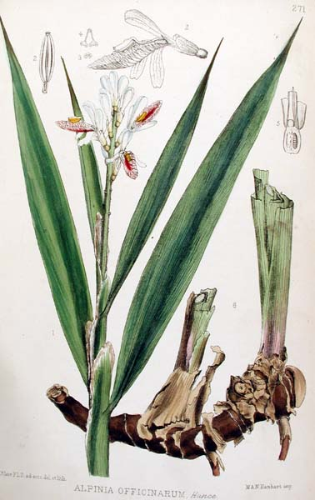
Lesser galangal shown in a plate from Medicinal Plants (1880)

- A Manual of Botany: including the structure, functions, classification, properties, and uses of plants, etc. (1861), at Google Books
- Characters, Properties, and Uses of Eucalyptus (1874)
- Botany (1875, London)
- Medicinal Plants: being descriptions with original figures of the principal plants employed in medicine and an account of the characters, properties, and uses of their parts and products of medicinal value - written with Henry Trimen (1880, London, Churchill)
- The Student's Guide to Structural, Morphological, and Physiological Botany (1883, London)
- A Text-book of Organic Materia Medica, comprising a description of the vegetable and animal drugs of the British Pharmacopoeia, with other non-official medicines, etc. (1887)
- Physiological botany: an abridgement of The students’ guide to structural, morphological, and physiological botany. Appleton & Comp. New York 1886 (Digitized).
