= George Dewhurst =

George Dewhurst may refer to:

- George Dewhurst (director), British actor, screenwriter and film director
- George Dewhurst (cricketer), Trinidadian cricketer
- George Dewhurst (Radical and Reformer) English Radical, Reformer and Reedmaker.
