= Frank E. Yeomans =

American psychiatrist (born 1949)

- Occupation: Attending Psychiatrist

Academic work
- Discipline: Psychiatry
- Website: frankyeomans.com

Dr. Frank Elton Yeomans is an American psychiatrist and professor of psychiatry, known in particular for his work related to personality disorders, especially through the furthering and spreading of knowledge on Transference-Focused Psychotherapy (TFP), which is an area of his expertise. Since 2024, he is a Clinical Professor of Psychiatry at Weill Cornell Medicine, where he is also Attending Psychiatrist.
