= Clarion A. Youmans =

American politician

Clarion Augustine Youmans (October 14, 1847 – July 9, 1906) was a member of the Wisconsin State Senate.

== Life ==
Youmans was born in Kenosha, Wisconsin. He later lived in Arlington, Wisconsin, Poynette, Wisconsin, and Neillsville, Wisconsin. In 1877, he married Nettie French. They had three children. He worked in farming and in the general store. In 1875, he studied law at the University of Wisconsin Law School and was admitted to the Wisconsin Bar. He practiced law with Merritt Clarke Ring in Neillsville, Wisconsin. He also served as Clark County, Wisconsin county judge. Youmans owned a farm in Clark County. He died on July 9, 1906, in Neillsville, Wisconsin.

== Career ==
Youmans was a member of the Senate from 1895 to 1897. He was a Republican.
