= James O'Neill (jurist) =

American judge (1847-1929)

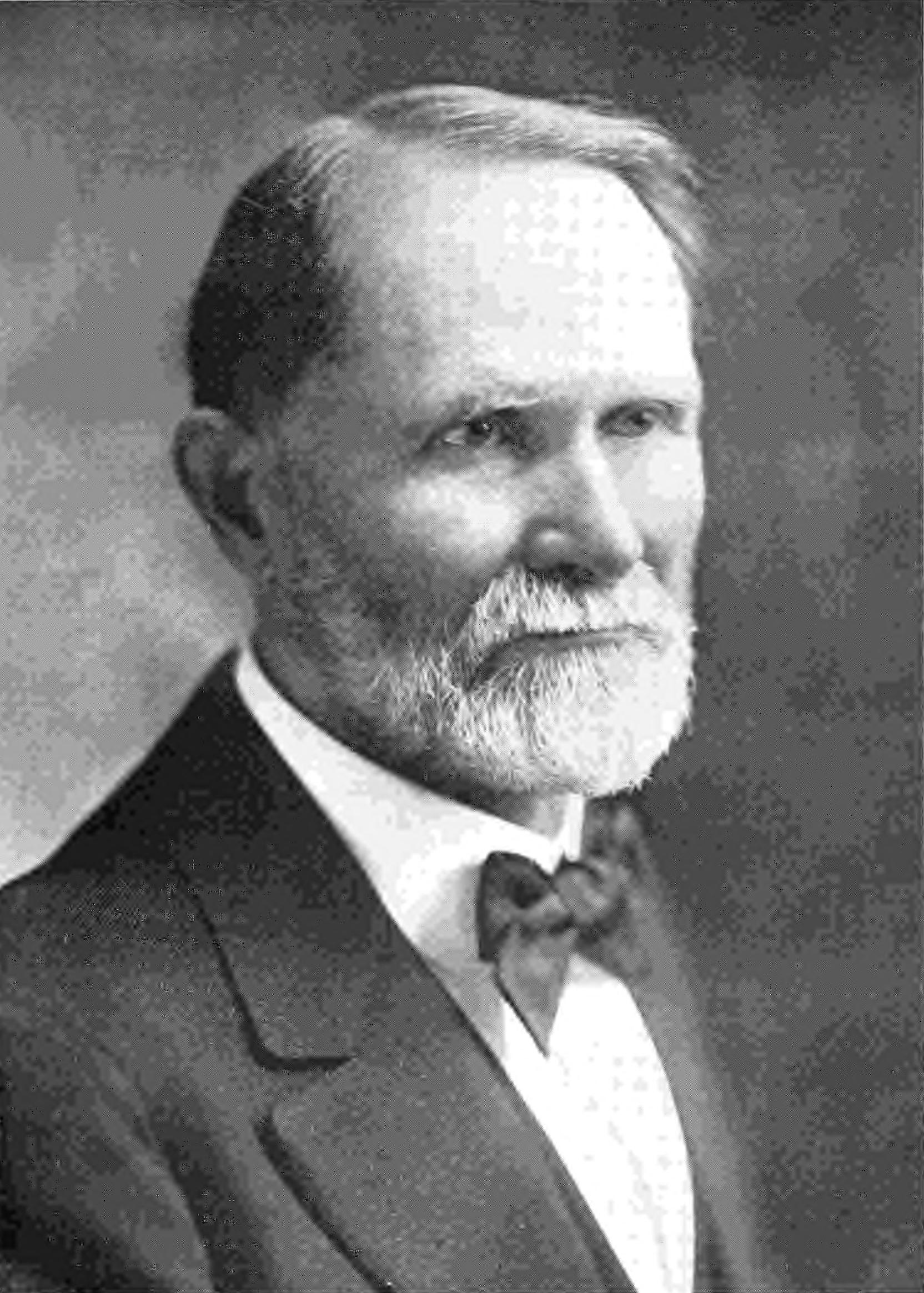
- Portrait from History of Clark County, Wisconsin (1918)

Wisconsin Circuit Court Judge for the 17th circuit
- In office January 3, 1898 – January 2, 1922
- Preceded by: William Francis Bailey
- Succeeded by: Emery Crosby

District Attorney of Clark County, Wisconsin
- In office September 1, 1888 – January 1, 1891
- Appointed by: Jeremiah McLain Rusk
- Preceded by: J. C. Campbell
- Succeeded by: L. M. Sturdevant

Member of the Wisconsin State Assembly from the Clark district
- In office January 5, 1885 – January 3, 1887
- Preceded by: Robert MacBride
- Succeeded by: Richard Dewhurst

Personal details
- Born: September 3, 1847 Lisbon, New York, U.S.
- Died: June 9, 1929 (aged 81) Clark County, Wisconsin, U.S.
- Resting place: Neillsville City Cemetery, Neillsville, Wisconsin
- Party: Republican
- Spouse: Marian Emma Robinson (died 1942)
- Children: 1
- Relatives: James O'Neill (uncle)
- Education: Lawrence University; Cornell University
- Profession: Lawyer

James O'Neill (September 3, 1847 – June 9, 1929) was an American lawyer, jurist, and Republican politician. He served 24 years as a Wisconsin circuit court judge in western Wisconsin. Earlier, he had served one term in the Wisconsin State Assembly, representing Clark County.

== Biography ==
Born in Lisbon, New York, O'Neill went to Lawrence University and later Cornell University where he graduated from in 1871. He taught school and studied law at Albany Law School, graduated in 1873, and was admitted to the New York Bar. In 1873, he moved to Neillsville, Wisconsin at the invitation of his uncle James O'Neill and practiced law. In 1885, he served in the Wisconsin State Assembly as a Republican. O'Neill was appointed District Attorney of Clark County, Wisconsin. He practiced law with Spencer M. Marsh until he was elected Wisconsin Circuit Court judge in 1897 serving until 1922. He was an unscucessful candidate in the 1906 Wisconsin Supreme Court election, placing second in a four-candidate race.

O'Neill died in Neillsville, Wisconsin on June 9, 1929.

Party political offices
Preceded by Charles E. Estabrook	Republican nominee for Attorney General of Wisconsin; 1890, 1892	Succeeded by William H. Mylrea
Wisconsin State Assembly
Preceded by Robert MacBride	Member of the Wisconsin State Assembly from the Clark district January 5, 1885 – January 3, 1887	Succeeded by Richard Dewhurst
Legal offices
Preceded by J. C. Campbell	District Attorney of Clark County, Wisconsin; September 1, 1888 – January 1, 1891	Succeeded by L. M. Sturdevant
Preceded by William Francis Bailey	Wisconsin Circuit Court Judge for the 17th circuit January 3, 1898 – January 2, 1922	Succeeded by Emery Crosby
