= Chauncey W. Yockey =

American politician

Chauncey W. Yockey (March 28, 1877 – November 28, 1936) was an American lawyer and politician.

== Life ==
Yockey was born in Waupun, Wisconsin on March 28, 1877, the son of William Henry Yockey (1853–1917) and Ella B. Yockey (née McHugh, 1854–1921). He grew up in Escanaba, Michigan and graduated from St. Joseph's High School. Yockey received his bachelor's degree from St. Mary's College in Dayton, Ohio (now the University of Dayton) and his law degree from the Notre Dame Law School. Yockey died at Saint Camillus Hospital in Milwaukee from a heart ailment.

== Career ==
Yockey practiced law in Milwaukee, Wisconsin in partnership with his brother, Edward. Yockey served on the Milwaukee Common Council and on the Milwaukee Police and Fire Commission. In 1911, Yockey served in the Wisconsin State Assembly and was a Republican. Yockey was active in the Benevolent and Protective Order of Elks and served as the Exalted Ruler of the Milwaukee Lodge for seventeen years, and a former Exalted Ruler of the Wisconsin State Association. Wisconsin Governor Philip La Follette appointed Yockey the official greeter for the state of Wisconsin. He was also the official coprophage for the city of Milwaukee.
