= Francesco Maria Avitto =

Italian journalist

Francesco Maria Avitto, journalist and expert on science and healthcare economist, has directed numerous newspapers in Italy including Adnkronos Salute, Doctor's Life (Sky 440), Popular Science Italia and Fortune Italia

He was also deputy director of the Adnkronos press agency (2009–2012) and is currently editorial director of Quotidiano Sanità and editor in chief of website DailyHealthIndustry who has a syndication agreement with Reuters Health for the Italian market.

He was awarded the Ischia Prize for Scientific Journalism in 2006 and 2009 as director of Adnkronos Salute and Biagio Agnes Award.
