= List of members of the New Zealand Legislative Council =

The following is a complete list of members of the New Zealand Legislative Council. The Legislative Council was New Zealand's upper house and existed from 1853 until its abolition in 1950. Initially appointed for life, tenure was changed to seven-year terms in 1891 for new appointments. New Zealand had 330 members of the Legislative Council, five of whom were women. Twice during its existence, in 1885 and 1950, membership peaked at 53 councillors; on the second occasion due to the so-called suicide squad that the National Government appointed to ensure that members voted for the abolition of the Legislative Council.

== Appointment and tenure ==
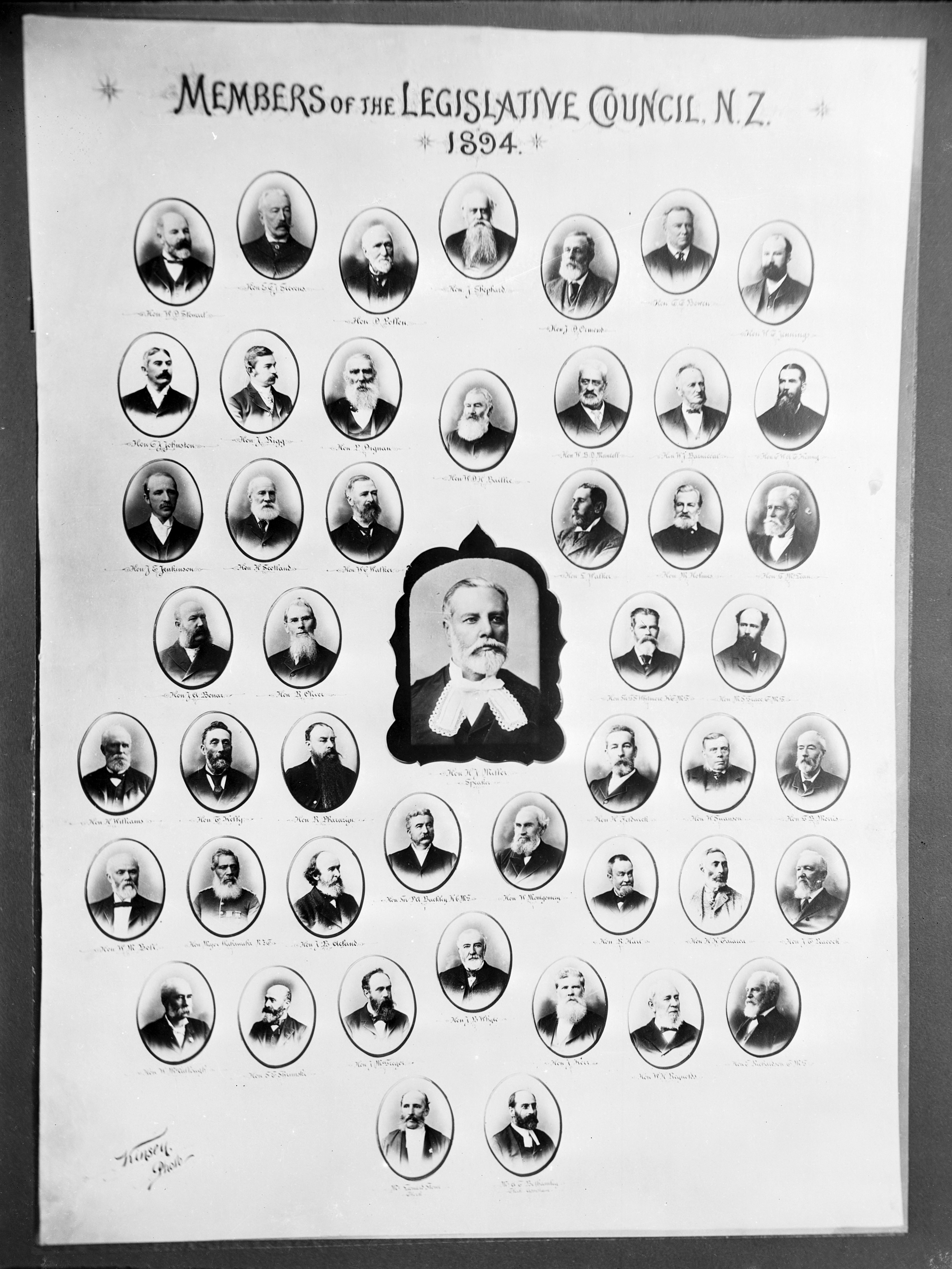
Members of the New Zealand Legislative Council in 1894

The New Zealand Constitution Act 1852 provided for councillors to be appointed for life terms by the governor. The first appointments were made by Governor George Grey in 1853, who chose from three broad groups: a 'prestige' group (e.g. wealthy runholders or nobility), a group with previous political experience, and a group of officials. Captain Bellairs, Major Lloyd, Dr Ralph Richardson, and Henry Petre belonged to the first group. The second group was made up of Henry Seymour (who had been a nominee of the Legislative Council of New Munster, which never met), whilst John Salmon and Frederick Whitaker represented the Legislative Council of New Ulster. William Swainson, Henry St. Hill, Mathew Richmond, and William Kenny were previous officials and represented the third group. John Salmon, William Swainson and Frederick Whitaker were the first three appointments (on 26 May 1853), and Mathew Richmond was appointed on 23 June 1853. The remaining appointments in 1853 were made on 31 December.

The quorum of the Legislative Council was fixed at five, and there was no initial upper limit of positions. Instructions received by the governor in 1855 contained an upper limit of 15 positions, which was increased to 20 in 1861, and removed altogether in 1862.

As the power of the governor over New Zealand politics gradually decreased, it became the convention that appointments were made on the recommendation of the premier (later prime minister), essentially meaning that councillors were selected by the government of the day. This change in practice happened during the 1860s and was certainly established by 1867. Tenure was changed by the Liberal Government to seven years; both political factions had campaigned in the 1890 election for a reform of the Legislative Council. The outgoing Atkinson Ministry made six appointments to the Legislative Council in January 1891 (Harry Atkinson, James Fulton, John Davies Ormond, William Downie Stewart, John Blair Whyte, and Charles Johnston), and these were the last life appointments.

The regulations were that members were disqualified when they had missed two sessions without absence having been granted. This applied mainly to the period from 1854 to 1891, when 17 members were disqualified. The rules were applied in a rather lax fashion, though, and in 1887 it was alleged that several members were technically disqualified, including the Attorney-General. The handling of the affair damaged the reputation of the Legislative Council.

The maximum size of the Legislative Council of 53 councillors was reached in 1885 and again in 1950. Over the years, the Legislative Council was stacked by the government of the day with members sympathetic to it, so that legislation could be passed more easily. The appointments by the second Stout–Vogel Ministry in 1884 and 1885 made the Legislative Council reach its maximum number on the first occasion. The so-called suicide squad appointed by the First National Government to ensure the abolition of the Legislative Council was the reason for achieving the maximum size on the second occasion. The Legislative Council was abolished in 1950 (memberships all terminated on 31 December 1950), with the Legislative Council Abolition Bill coming into force on 1 January 1951.

Captain Baillie served on the Legislative Council for 61 years and had the longest membership. The Legislative Council had a speaker, and from 1865 a chairman of committees; these roles were modelled on the equivalent functions in the New Zealand House of Representatives. There were 18 speakers and 13 chairmen of committees, respectively. William Swainson was the first speaker, whilst Mathew Richmond was the first chairmen of committees. Four New Zealand premiers or prime ministers were head of government while they a member of the Legislative Council. Two of those, Frederick Whitaker and Francis Bell, were at other times also members of parliament. The other two, George Waterhouse and Daniel Pollen, were not at other times also member of parliament; they only served on the Legislative Council.

The Statutes Amendment Act (1941) allowed for women to be appointed to the Legislative Council. The first two women, Mary Anderson and Mary Dreaver, were appointed in 1946 by the First Labour Government. Three more women were appointed in 1950 as part of the suicide squad: Agnes Weston, Cora Louisa Burrell, and Ethel Gould. Thus, of the 330 legislative councillors that were appointed over its 97 years of existence, only five were women, with three of them there to abolish the Legislative Council.

== List of members ==
Over the 97 years of its existence, 330 members served on the Legislative Council.

== A ==
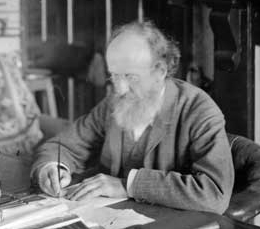
John Acland was one of the many runholders during the 19th century that were on the Legislative Council

- John Acland (8 July 1865 – 1 June 1899)
- John Aitken (14 July 1914 – 13 July 1921)
- John Alexander (22 June 1934 – 21 June 1941)
- Ewen Alison (7 May 1918 – 6 May 1925; 7 May 1925 – 6 May 1932)
- Andrew Allen (22 June 1950 – 31 December 1950)
- James Allen (1 June 1927 – 31 May 1934)
- John Southgate Allen (27 July 1950 – 31 December 1950)
- Allen Alexander (22 June 1950 – 31 December 1950)
- George James Anderson (22 June 1934 – 15 December 1935)
- Mary Anderson (31 January 1946 – 31 December 1950)
- John Anstey (22 January 1907 – 21 January 1914)
- John Archer (22 September 1937 – 21 September 1944; 22 September 1944 – 26 April 1949)
- Francis Arkwright (13 December 1895 – 12 December 1902; 13 December 1902 – 23 July 1906)
- George Arney (20 February 1858 – 13 June 1866)
- Harry Atkinson (22 January 1891 – 28 June 1892)

== B ==
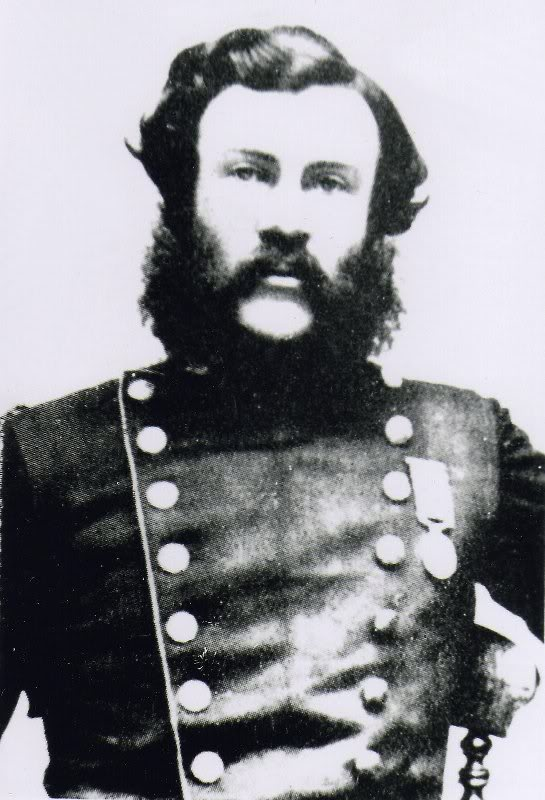
At 61 years of service, W. D. H. Baillie had the longest membership of the Legislative Council

- W. D. H. Baillie (8 March 1861 – 24 February 1922)
- Alfred Baldey (18 March 1903 – 17 March 1910; 18 March 1910 – 17 March 1917)
- John Barnicoat (14 May 1883 – 21 June 1902)
- John Barr (22 January 1907 – 21 January 1914; 22 January 1914 – 21 January 1921; 22 January 1921 – 21 January 1928; 22 January 1928 – 7 December 1930)
- Thomas Bartley (11 July 1854 – 3 July 1874)
- John Bathgate (15 May 1885 – 21 September 1886)
- William Beehan (22 June 1903 – 21 June 1910; 22 June 1910 – 21 June 1917)
- Cheviot Bell (27 July 1950 – 31 December 1950)
- Dillon Bell (26 May 1854 – 15 January 1856; 5 July 1877 – 7 December 1880)
- Francis Bell (10 July 1912 – 20 May 1919; 20 May 1919 – 20 May 1926; 21 May 1926 – 20 May 1933; 20 May 1933 – 13 March 1936)
- Edmund Bellairs (31 December 1853 – 17 June 1856)
- Thomas Otto Bishop (9 March 1943 – 8 March 1950; 15 March 1950 – 31 December 1950)
- Walter Black (8 September 1941 – 7 September 1948; 8 September 1948 – 31 December 1950)
- Charles Blakiston (8 October 1857 – 15 July 1862)
- Tom Bloodworth (22 June 1934 – 21 June 1941; 8 September 1941 – 7 September 1948; 8 September 1948 – 31 December 1950)
- William Bolt (15 October 1892 – 15 October 1899; 16 October 1899 – 15 October 1906; 16 October 1906 – 29 April 1907)
- James Bonar (27 June 1868 – 7 November 1901)
- Charles Bowen (16 December 1874 – 20 December 1874; 20 January 1891 – 12 December 1917)
- Alfred Brandon (5 June 1883 – 22 September 1886)
- De Renzie Brett (3 July 1871 – 16 June 1889)
- Mark Briggs (9 March 1936 – 8 March 1943; 9 March 1943 – 8 March 1950)
- Tom Brindle (9 March 1936 – 8 March 1943; 9 March 1943 – 8 March 1950)
- Andrew Buchanan (24 July 1862 – 30 June 1874)
- Walter Clarke Buchanan (23 June 1915 – 22 June 1922; 23 June 1922 – 19 July 1924)
- George Buckley (3 July 1871 – 19 August 1884; 28 October 1884 – 9 September 1885)
- Patrick Buckley (23 July 1878 – 20 December 1895)
- David Buddo (11 June 1930 – 10 June 1937)
- Archibald Burns (22 June 1934 – 21 June 1941)
- Cora Louisa Burrell (22 June 1950 – 31 December 1950)

== C ==
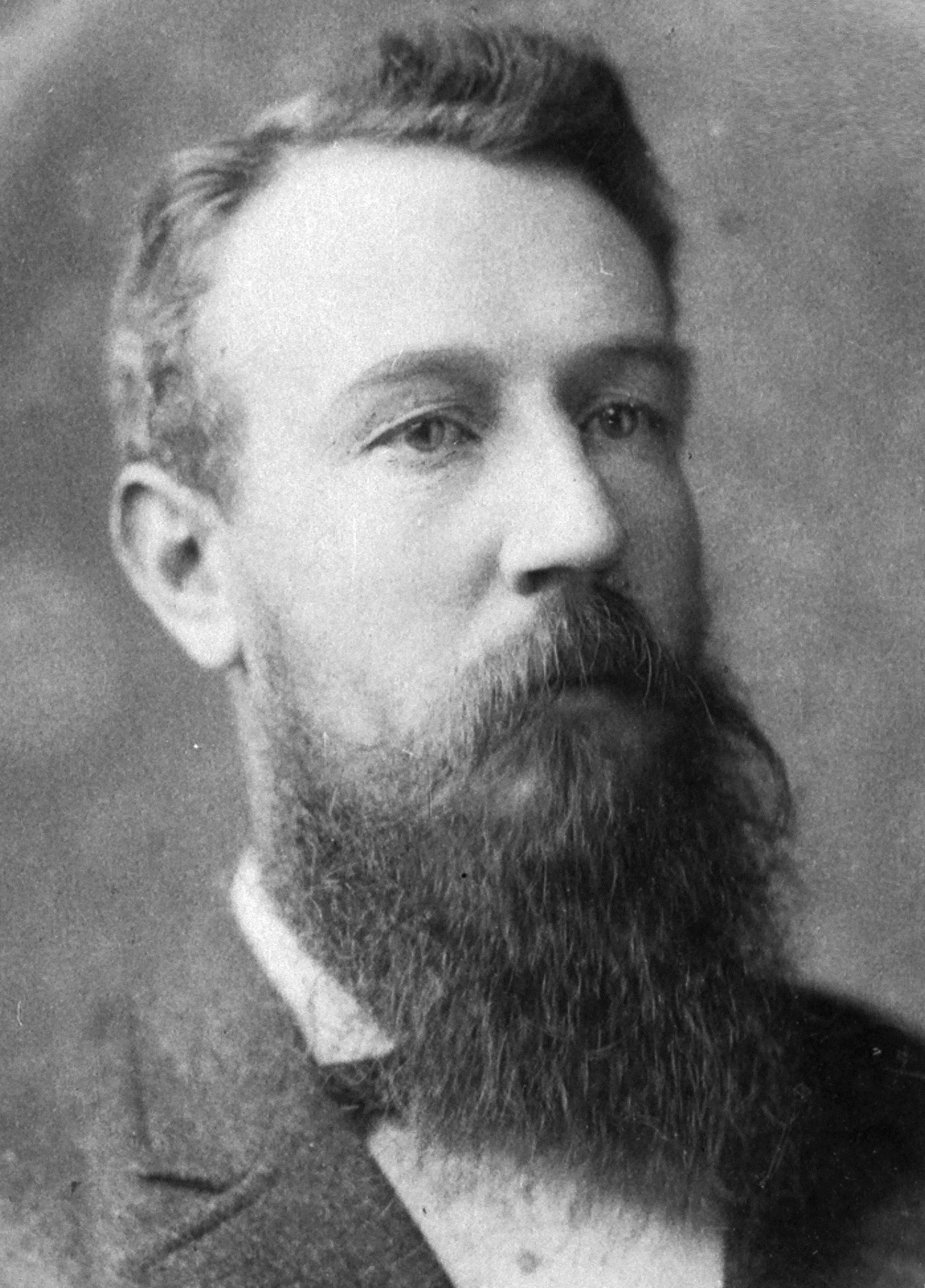
Alfred Cadman was Speaker in 1904–1905

- Alfred Cadman (21 December 1899 – 23 March 1905)
- John Callan (22 January 1907 – 21 January 1914)
- Archie Campbell (15 December 1939 – 14 December 1946; 15 January 1947 – 31 December 1950)
- Robert Campbell (13 May 1870 – 10 December 1889)
- James Palmer Campbell (2 September 1921 – 27 February 1926)
- Walter Carncross (18 March 1903 – 17 March 1910; 18 March 1910 – 17 March 1917; 17 March 1917 – 16 March 1924; 17 March 1924 – 16 March 1931; 17 March 1931 – 16 March 1938; 17 March 1938 – 30 June 1940)
- Carey Carrington (17 June 1926 – 16 June 1933; 17 June 1933 – 16 June 1940)
- James Carroll (2 September 1921 – 18 October 1926)
- Gilbert Carson (14 July 1914 – 13 July 1921)
- Henry Chamberlin (8 February 1869 – 12 April 1888)
- Alfred Rowland Chetham-Strode (8 July 1865 – 30 November 1867)
- Edward Henry Clark (25 June 1920 – 24 June 1927; 25 June 1927 – 10 September 1932)
- Allan Cockerell (22 June 1950 – 31 December 1950)
- Mark Cohen (25 June 1920 – 24 June 1927; 25 June 1927 – 3 March 1928)
- William Collins (22 January 1907 – 21 January 1914; 14 July 1914 – 13 July 1921; 14 July 1921 – 13 July 1928; 14 July 1928 – 11 August 1934)
- Michael Connelly (9 March 1936 – 8 March 1943; 9 March 1943 – 8 March 1950)
- Arthur Cook (10 September 1942 – 4 March 1943)
- Henry Coote (8 July 1865 – 25 March 1867)
- James Cotter (9 March 1936 – 8 March 1943; 9 March 1943 – 30 April 1947)
- Coutts Crawford (15 August 1859 – 27 November 1867)
- James Craigie (1 June 1923 – 31 May 1930)
- Cyril Croker (27 July 1950 – 31 December 1950)
- James Cumming (23 June 1941 – 22 June 1948; 23 June 1948 – 31 December 1950)
- John Curling (1 June 1857 – 1 May 1861)
- George Cutfield (31 December 1853 – 18 March 1854; 16 February 1858 – 10 April 1867)

== D ==
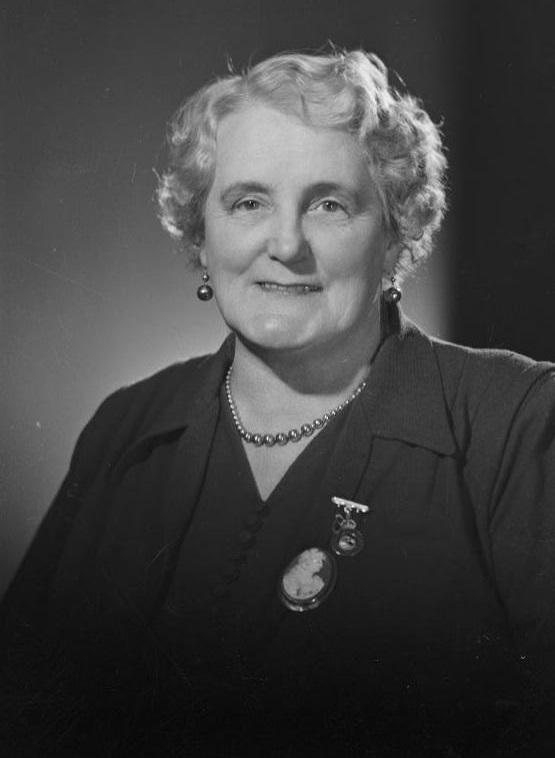
Mary Dreaver, one of the first two women appointed in 1946

- Eliot Davis (22 June 1934 – 21 June 1941; 8 September 1941 – 7 September 1948; 8 September 1948 – 31 December 1950)
- Harold Dickie (22 June 1950 – 31 December 1950)
- Patrick Dignan (3 February 1879 – 20 October 1894)
- Alfred Domett (19 June 1866 – 3 July 1874)
- Thomas Francis Doyle (9 March 1936 – 8 March 1943; 9 March 1943 – 8 March 1950)
- Mary Dreaver (31 January 1946 – 31 December 1950)
- John Edward Duncan (22 September 1937 – 21 September 1944; 22 September 1944 – 31 December 1950)
- Thomas Young Duncan (13 June 1912 – 18 August 1914)
- John Duthie (26 June 1913 – 14 October 1915)
- Teddy Dye (9 March 1936 – 25 January 1942)

== E ==
- William Earnshaw (26 June 1913 – 25 June 1920; 25 June 1920 – 24 June 1927; 25 June 1927 – 29 December 1931)
- Richard Eddy (23 June 1941 – 22 June 1948; 23 June 1948 – 31 December 1950)
- Nathaniel Edwards (9 July 1872 – 15 July 1880)
- Bill Endean (22 June 1950 – 31 December 1950)

== F ==
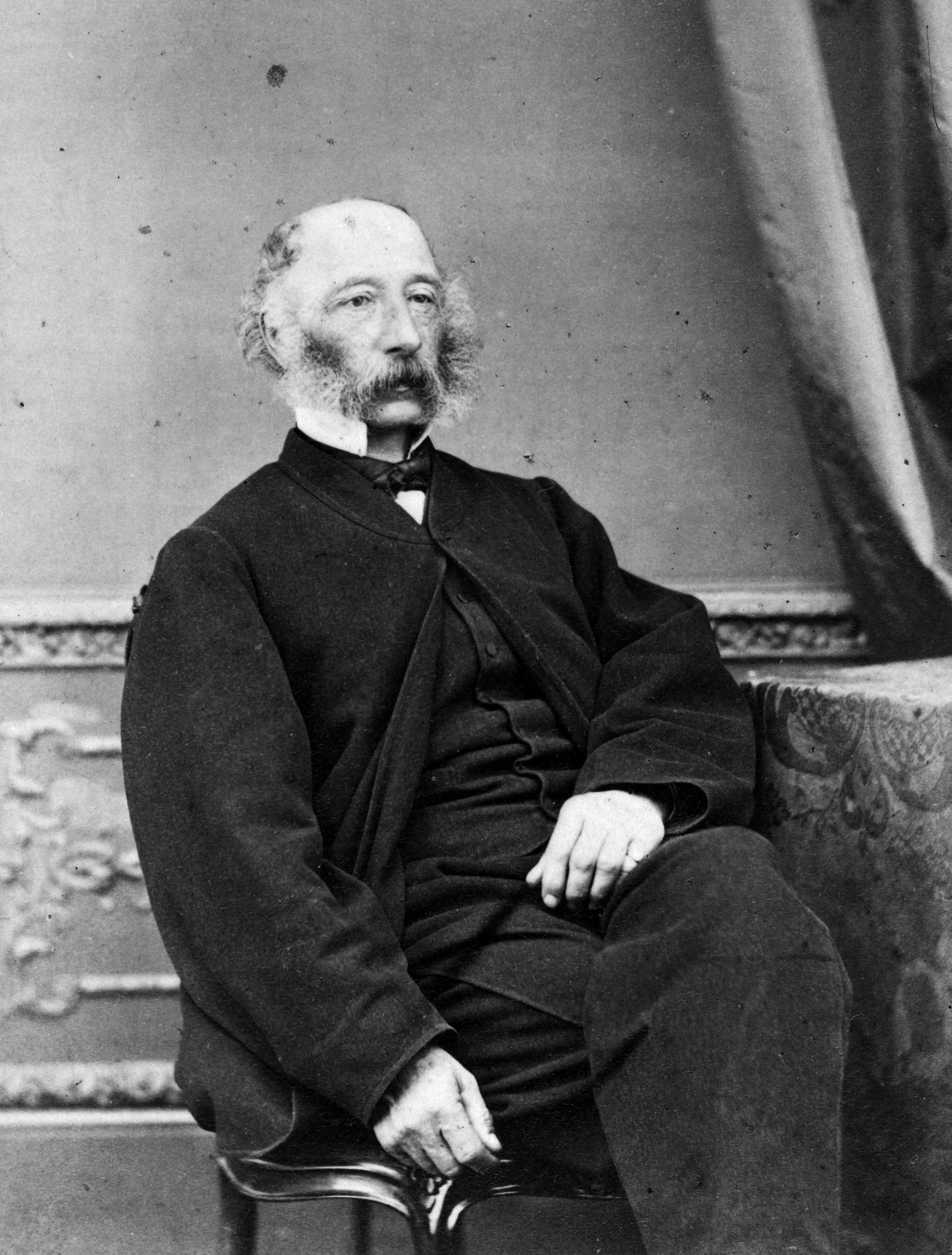
William Fitzherbert was twice Speaker for a total of 12 years

- Mark Fagan (11 June 1930 – 10 June 1937; 11 June 1937 – 10 June 1944; 11 June 1944 – 31 December 1947)
- James Farmer (3 July 1871 – 29 July 1874)
- Henry Feldwick (15 October 1892 – 15 October 1899; 16 October 1899 – 15 October 1906; 16 October 1906 – 3 August 1908)
- Francis Dart Fenton (2 June 1869 – 30 December 1870)
- John Findlay (23 November 1906 – 20 November 1911)
- John Finlayson (22 June 1950 – 31 December 1950)
- John Fisher (14 July 1914 – 13 July 1921)
- William Fitzherbert (14 June 1879 – 7 February 1891)
- David Thomas Fleming (7 May 1918 – 6 May 1925; 7 May 1925 – 6 May 1932)
- Alfred Fraser (7 May 1918 – 24 February 1919)
- Francis Humphris Fraser (22 June 1899 – 21 June 1906)
- Thomas Fraser (13 May 1870 – 24 June 1891)
- William Fraser (27 November 1919 – 17 July 1923)
- James Fulton (22 January 1891 – 20 November 1891)

== G ==
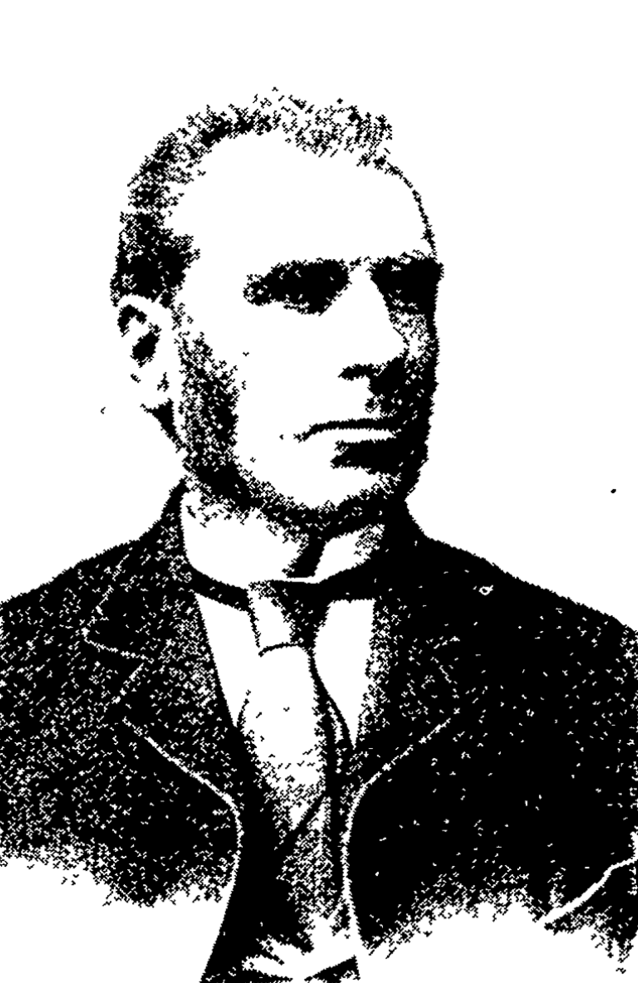
Hugh Gourley was first appointed in 1899 and served for one seven-year term

- George Garland (7 May 1918 – 6 May 1925; 7 May 1925 – 6 May 1932)
- William Geddis (7 May 1918 – 6 May 1925; 7 May 1925 – 1 May 1926)
- Seymour Thorne George (22 June 1903 – 21 June 1910; 22 June 1910 – 21 June 1917)
- John Anderson Gilfillan (6 May 1854 – 2 August 1861; 12 July 1862 – 23 April 1866)
- Hamilton Gilmer (22 January 1907 – 21 January 1914
- William Girling (22 June 1950 – 31 December 1950)
- William Gisborne (2 July 1869 – 11 January 1871)
- James Goodall (9 March 1936 – 22 September 1942)
- Hugh Gourley (22 June 1899 – 21 June 1906)
- James Gow (7 May 1918 – 6 May 1925; 7 May 1925 – 6 May 1932)
- Morgan Grace (13 May 1870 – 19 April 1903)
- Ernest Gray (19 June 1866 – 20 July 1883)
- Ethel Gould (22 June 1950 – 31 December 1950)
- Joseph Grimmond (7 May 1918 – 27 November 1924)
- William Grounds (15 July 1940 – 14 July 1947; 15 July 1947 – 31 December 1950)
- David Guthrie (28 October 1925 – 31 March 1927)

Samuel Osborne-Gibbes, sometimes referred to under the surname Gibbes, is listed under 'O' below

== H ==
- John Hall (24 July 1862 – 23 February 1866; 19 July 1872 – 21 October 1875; 19 April 1876 – 13 September 1876; 15 September 1876 – 20 August 1879)
- William Hall-Jones (7 October 1913 – 6 October 1920; 6 October 1920 – 5 October 1927; 6 October 1927 – 5 October 1934; 6 October 1934 – 19 June 1936)
- Edwin Hamilton (22 June 1950 – 31 December 1950)
- Josiah Hanan (17 June 1926 – 16 June 1933; 17 June 1933 – 16 June 1940; 15 July 1940 – 14 July 1947; 15 July 1947 – 31 December 1950)
- Charles Albert Creery Hardy (26 June 1913 – 25 June 1920; 25 June 1920 – 29 August 1922)
- Benjamin Harris (3 February 1897 – 2 February 1904; 3 February 1904 – 2 February 1911; 3 February 1911 – 2 February 1918; 15 February 1918 – 20 June 1923)
- John Hyde Harris (13 April 1858 – 1 December 1864; 8 July 1867 – 18 July 1868)
- Robert Hart (9 July 1872 – 16 September 1894)
- Joseph Hawdon (8 May 1866 – 12 April 1871)
- Archibald Hawke (7 May 1918 – 6 May 1925; 7 May 1925 – 6 May 1932)
- William Hayward (22 June 1934 – 21 June 1941)
- Thomas Henderson (25 July 1878 – 27 June 1886)
- Thomas William Hislop (2 September 1921 – 2 October 1925)
- James Holmes (18 April 1902 – 17 April 1909; 18 April 1909 – 17 April 1910)
- Matthew Holmes (19 June 1866 – 27 September 1901)
- George Robert Hunter (9 March 1936 – 8 March 1943; 9 March 1943 – 23 October 1949)

== I ==
- Leonard Isitt (28 October 1925 – 27 October 1932; 22 June 1934 – 29 July 1937)
- Charles Hayward Izard (7 May 1918 – 6 May 1925; 7 May 1925 – 18 September 1925)

== J ==
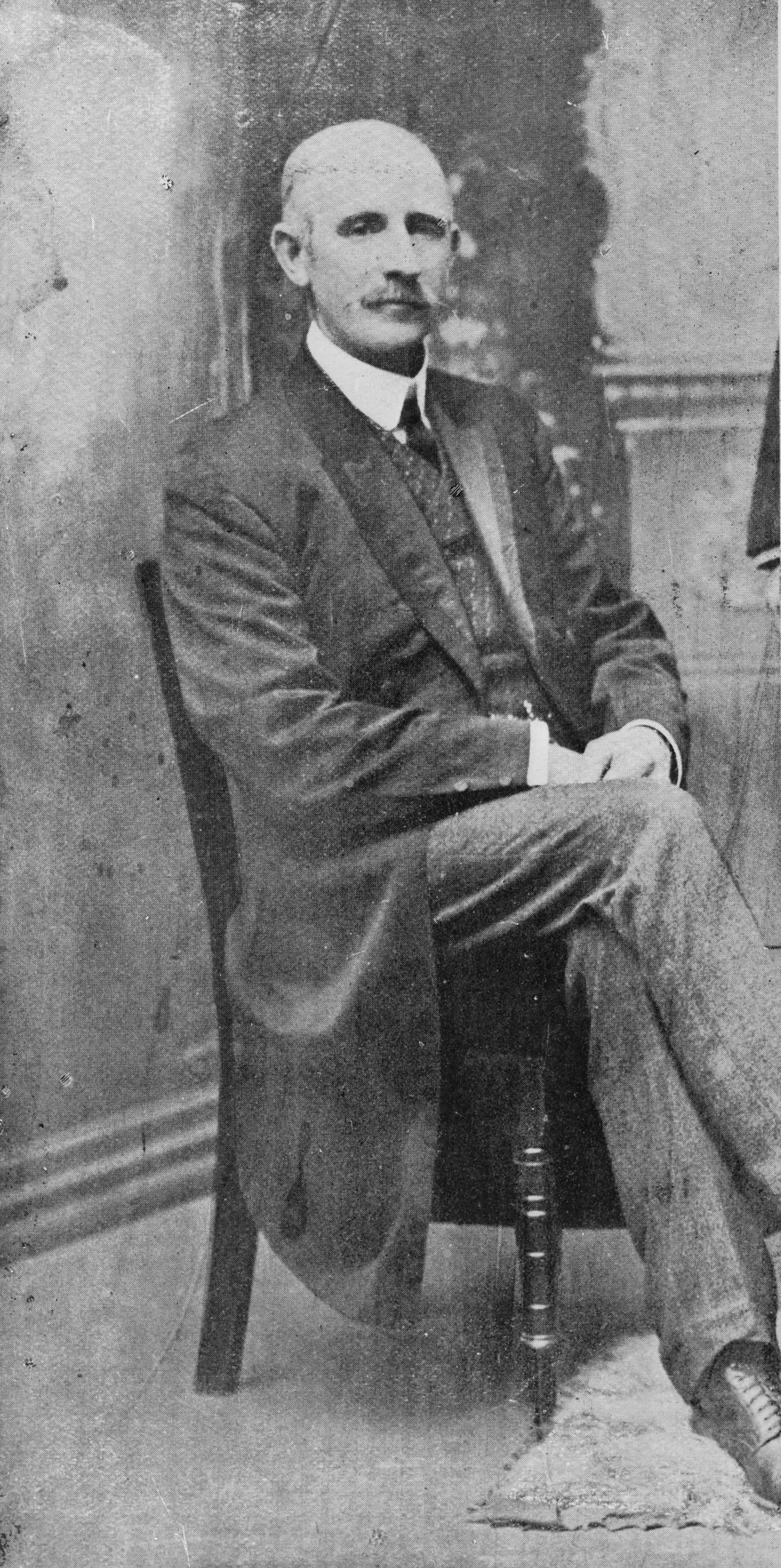
John Jenkinson was first appointed in 1892, when the Liberal Government started appointing trade unionists onto the Legislative Council

- John Jenkinson (15 October 1892 – 27 May 1893; 6 June 1893 – 5 June 1900; 6 June 1900 – 5 June 1907; 1 July 1907 – 30 June 1914)
- William Thomas Jennings (10 October 1892 – 15 October 1899; 15 October 1899 – 23 October 1902)
- George Randall Johnson (23 July 1872 – 23 November 1892)
- Charles Johnston (20 January 1891 – 13 June 1918)
- John Johnston (31 March 1857 – 6 November 1860; 11 March 1861 – 16 November 1887)
- George Jones (13 December 1895 – 12 December 1902; 13 December 1902 – 12 December 1909; 13 December 1909 – 12 December 1916; 7 May 1918 – 16 December 1920)

== K ==
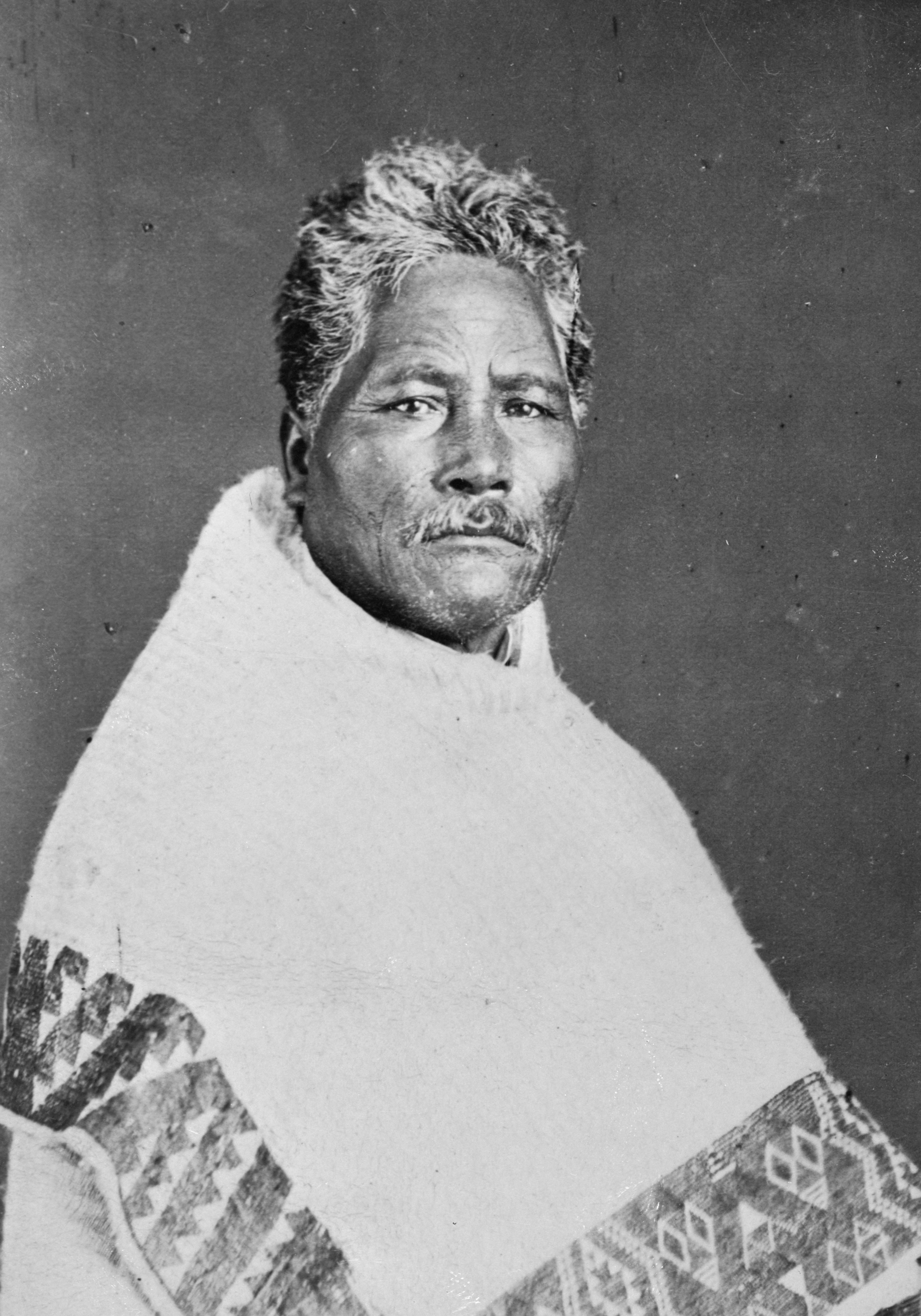
Mōkena Kōhere, one of the first two Māori appointed in 1872

- Francis Patrick Kelly (22 June 1950 – 31 December 1950)
- Thomas Kelly (15 October 1892 – 15 October 1899; 16 October 1899 – 15 October 1906; 16 October 1906 – 15 October 1913)
- William Kelly (3 February 1897 – 2 February 1904; 3 February 1904 – 19 September 1907)
- Courtney Kenny (15 May 1885 – 12 December 1905)
- William Kenny (26 May 1853 – 17 August 1880)
- James Kerr (15 October 1892 – 14 October 1899; 15 October 1899 – 25 August 1901)
- Mōkena Kōhere (11 October 1872 – 25 April 1887)

== L ==
- Henry Lahmann (9 July 1872 – 1 June 1890)
- James Dupré Lance (12 July 1865 – 18 October 1867)
- Frederic Lang (22 February 1924 – 21 February 1931)
- Frank Lark (9 March 1936 – 8 March 1943; 9 March 1943 – 21 March 1946)
- Alfred Lee Smith (18 June 1898 – 18 June 1905)
- Leslie Lee (24 July 1862 – 8 November 1870)
- Nathaniel Levin (25 June 1869 – 11 January 1871)
- Henry Livingstone (22 June 1950 – 31 December 1950)
- John Yeeden Lloyd (31 December 1853 – ?; 4 October 1855 – 29 December 1857)
- Robert Loughnan (6 May 1907 – 5 May 1914)
- Charles Louisson (22 December 1900 – 21 December 1907; 14 January 1908 – 13 January 1915; 7 May 1918 – 19 April 1924)
- Charles Luke (22 January 1907 – 21 January 1914)

== M ==
- Richard McCallum (11 June 1930 – 10 June 1937)
- William Wilson McCardle (22 January 1907 – 21 January 1914)
- Jack McCullough (9 March 1936 – 8 March 1943; 9 March 1943 – 29 July 1947)
- William McCullough (15 October 1892 – 14 October 1899)
- Kennedy Macdonald (22 June 1903 – 21 June 1910; 22 June 1910 – 31 May 1911)
- Thomas MacGibbon (14 July 1914 – 13 July 1921)
- James McGowan (6 January 1909 – 7 May 1912)
- John MacGregor (15 October 1892 – 15 October 1899; 14 July 1914 – 13 July 1921; 14 July 1921 – 13 July 1928; 14 July 1928 – 13 July 1935)
- William McIntyre (2 September 1921 – 1 September 1928; 2 September 1928 – 2 September 1935; 2 September 1935 – 1 September 1942; 10 September 1942 – 9 September 1949; 16 September 1949 – 26 October 1949)
- John McKenzie (17 May 1901 – 6 August 1901)
- Thomas Mackenzie (12 March 1921 – 11 March 1928; 12 March 1928 – 14 February 1930)
- Garnet Mackley (22 June 1950 – 31 December 1950)
- Angus McLagan (30 June 1942 – 28 October 1946)
- Every Maclean (11 July 1873 – 15 June 1876)
- George McLean (19 December 1881 – 17 February 1917)
- John McLean (10 April 1867 – 21 August 1872)
- Bruce McLeod (22 June 1950 – 31 December 1950)
- James McLeod (22 June 1934 – 21 June 1941; 8 September 1941 – 31 March 1944)
- Robert McMillan (22 June 1950 – 31 December 1950)
- Andrew Maginnity (14 July 1914 – 12 March 1918)
- Mahuta Tāwhiao (the third Māori King) (22 May 1903 – 21 May 1910)
- Alexander Malcolm (16 June 1924 – 15 June 1931)
- Francis Mander (1 June 1923 – 30 May 1930)
- Walter Mantell (19 June 1866 – 7 September 1895)
- James Marshall (18 April 1902 – 17 April 1909; 17 April 1909 – 9 October 1912)
- Bernard Martin (9 March 1936 – 8 March 1943; 9 March 1943 – 8 March 1950)
- John Martin (25 July 1878 – 17 May 1892)
- Lee Martin (31 January 1946 – 31 December 1950)
- Hoeroa Marumaru (22 June 1950 – 31 December 1950)
- Robert Masters (11 June 1930 – 10 June 1937)
- Rangi Mawhete (9 March 1936 – 8 March 1943; 9 March 1943 – 8 March 1950)
- Ossie Mazengarb (22 June 1950 – 31 December 1950)
- James Menzies (28 January 1858 – 18 August 1888)
- Henry Michel (7 May 1918 – 6 May 1925; 7 May 1925 – 4 March 1930)
- Henry Miller (8 July 1865 – 28 June 1917)
- John A. Millar (23 June 1915 – 15 October 1915)
- Charles H. Mills (2 March 1909 – 1 March 1916)
- Edwin Mitchelson (25 June 1920 – 24 June 1927; 25 June 1927 – 11 April 1934)
- William Montgomery (15 October 1892 – 14 October 1899; 16 October 1899 – 15 October 1906; 16 October 1906 – 25 May 1907)
- Richard Moore (14 July 1914 – 13 July 1920; 14 July 1921 – 13 July 1928; 14 July 1928 – 13 July 1935)
- William Morgan (14 July 1914 – 18 February 1918)
- George Morris (15 May 1885 – 16 April 1903)
- Nathaniel Morse (8 May 1866 – 12 May 1869)
- David Murdoch (22 June 1950 – 31 December 1950)

== N ==
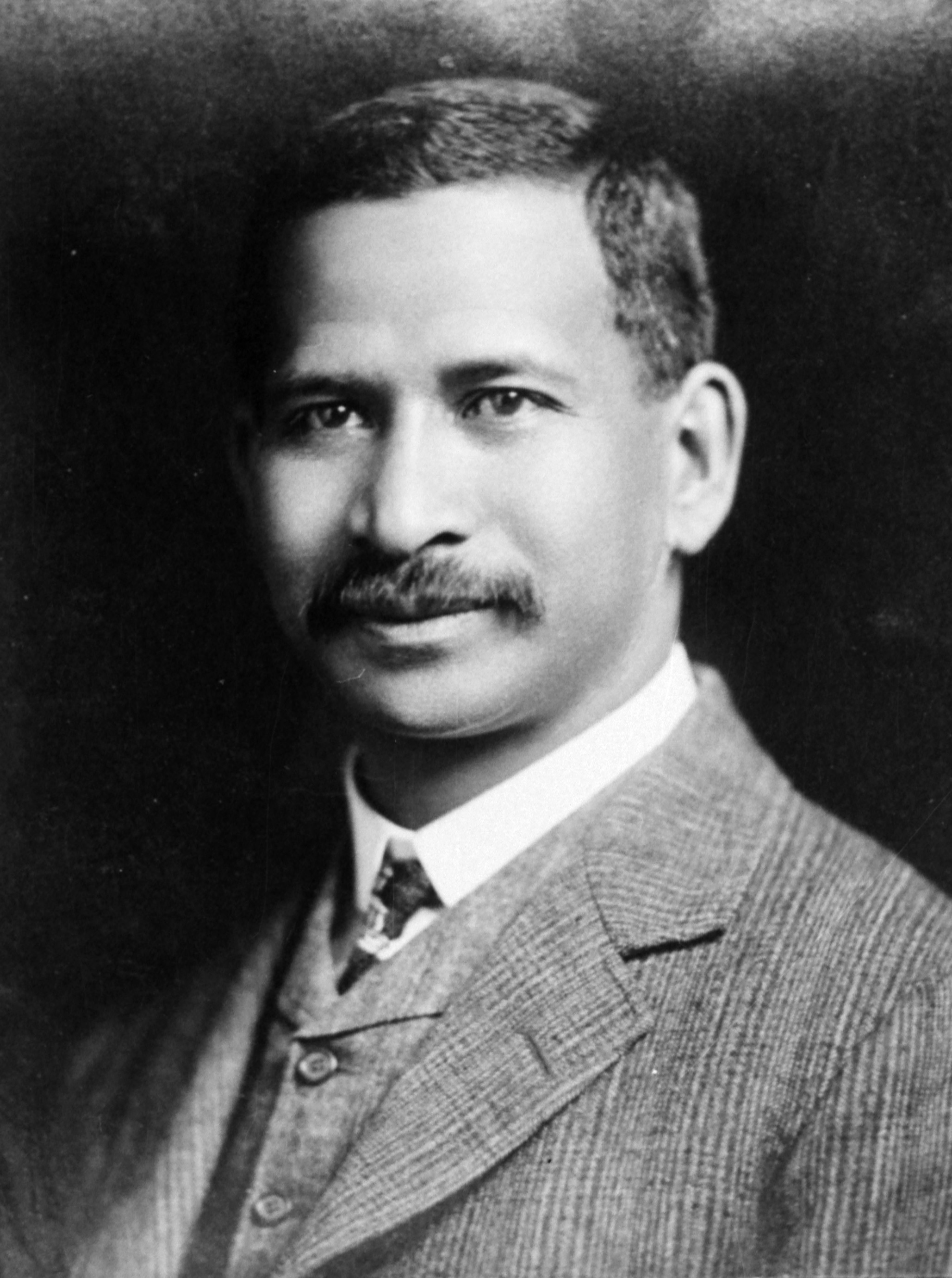
Āpirana Ngata, often described as New Zealand's foremost Māori politician, was appointed in 1950, but was too ill and died without ever having taken his seat

- Patrick Nerheny (25 June 1920 – 2 December 1921)
- Alfred Newman (1 June 1923 – 3 April 1924)
- Edward Newman (1 June 1923 – 31 May 1930)
- Āpirana Ngata (22 June 1950 – 14 July 1950)^{1}
- Wiremu Tako Ngātata (11 October 1872 – 8 November 1887)
- Wiremu Kerei Nikora (26 June 1913 – 15 July 1915)
- William Nurse (27 June 1868 – 23 May 1885)

^{1}died before taking seat

== O ==
- Tom O'Byrne (22 June 1934 – 21 June 1941; 23 June 1941 – 22 June 1948; 23 June 1948 – 31 December 1950)
- Francis Edward O'Flynn (22 September 1937 – 19 June 1942)
- Patrick Joseph O'Kane (8 September 1941 – 7 September 1948; 8 September 1948 – 31 December 1950)
- Richard Oliver (10 November 1881 – 4 April 1901)
- James O'Neill (4 May 1869 – 8 July 1872)
- Patrick O'Regan (9 September 1946 – 24 April 1947)
- John Davies Ormond (20 January 1891 – 6 October 1917)
- Maurice O'Rorke (25 June 1904 – 24 June 1911; 25 June 1911 – 25 August 1916)
- Samuel Osborne-Gibbes (2 October 1855 – 6 October 1863)
- Alex O'Shea (22 June 1950 – 31 December 1950)

== P ==
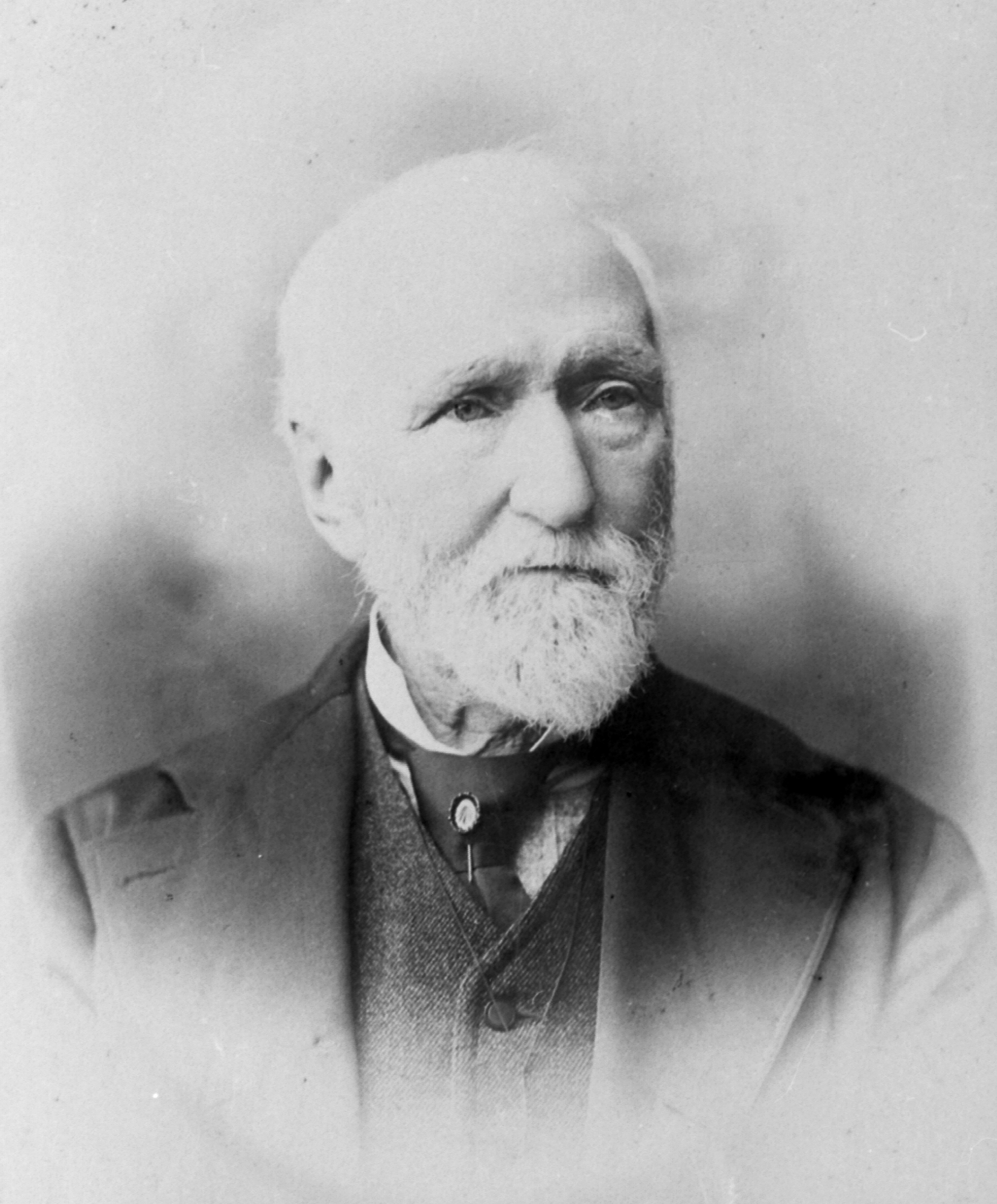
Daniel Pollen was a member of the Legislative Council when he served as Premier; he was never a Member of Parliament

- Tame Parata (13 June 1912 – 6 March 1917)
- James Parr (9 October 1931 – 31 December 1933)
- James Paterson (17 June 1869 – 19 August 1884)
- John Topi Patuki (7 May 1918 – 6 May 1925)
- Tom Paul (22 January 1907 – 21 January 1914; 22 January 1914 – 25 November 1919; 9 September 1946 – 31 December 1950)
- John Thomas Peacock (3 June 1873 – 20 September 1877; 9 October 1877 – 20 October 1905)
- Ponsonby Peacocke (8 May 1866 – 29 May 1872)
- Wi Pere (22 January 1907 – 27 June 1912)
- William Perry (22 June 1934 – 21 June 1941; 23 June 1941 – 22 June 1948; 23 June 1948 – 31 December 1950)
- William Spence Peter (23 June 1868 – 23 May 1891)
- Henry Petre (31 December 1853 – 6 November 1860)
- Charles Johnson Pharazyn (17 June 1869 – 11 March 1885)
- Robert Pharazyn (15 May 1885 – 19 July 1896)
- Francis Pillans (24 January 1863 – 28 July 1873)
- David Pinkerton (3 February 1897 – 2 February 1904; 3 February 1904 – 23 June 1906)
- Albert Pitt (23 December 1899 – 18 November 1906)
- Hilcote Pitts-Brown (22 June 1950 – 31 December 1950)
- Daniel Pollen (16 July 1861 – 4 December 1867; 10 June 1868 – 1870; 12 May 1873 – 18 May 1896)
- William Polson (15 March 1950 – 31 December 1950)
- James Prendergast (8 July 1865 – 15 March 1867)

== R ==
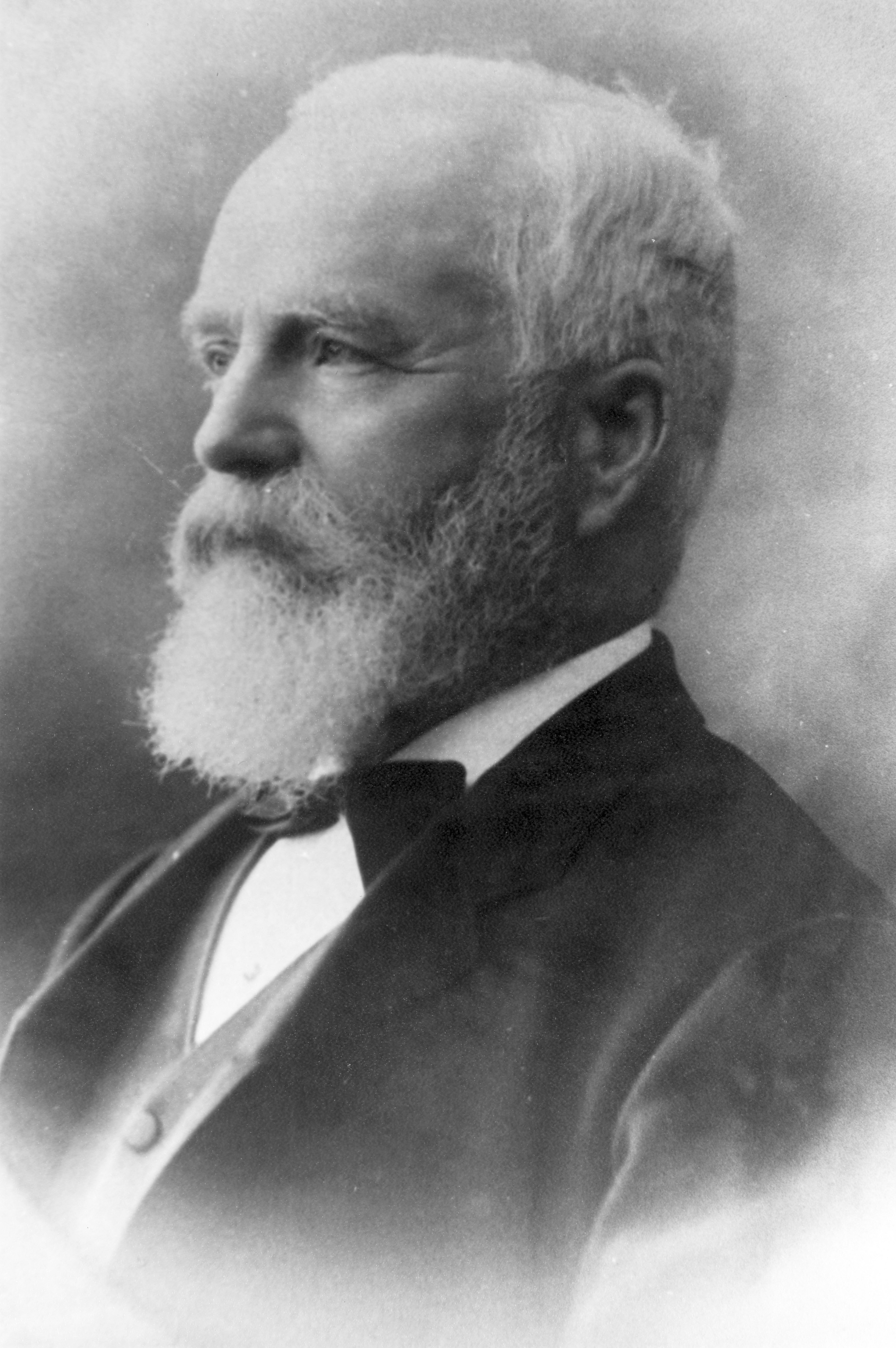
Edward Richardson was for many years an MP before serving on the Legislative Council for one seven-year term

- Neill Rattray (22 June 1950 – 31 December 1950)
- Vernon Reed (16 June 1924 – 15 June 1931)
- Richard Reeves (13 December 1895 – 12 December 1902; 13 December 1902 – 12 December 1909; 13 December 1909 – 1 June 1910)
- William Reeves (21 October 1884 – 4 April 1891)
- Thomas Renwick (15 October 1863 – 28 November 1879)
- William Reynolds (30 April 1878 – 1 April 1899)
- Heaton Rhodes (28 October 1925 – 27 October 1932; 22 June 1934 – 21 June 1941)
- William Barnard Rhodes (4 August 1871 – 11 February 1878)
- Edward Richardson (15 October 1892 – 15 October 1899)
- John Richardson (10 April 1867 – 6 December 1878)
- Ralph Richardson (31 December 1853 – 13 December 1856)
- James Crowe Richmond (8 July 1865 – 23 April 1866; 14 May 1883 – 7 July 1892)
- Mathew Richmond (23 June 1853 – 5 March 1887)
- John Rigg (15 October 1892 – 27 May 1893; 6 June 1893 – 6 June 1900; 6 June 1900 – 6 June 1907; 1 July 1907 – 30 June 1914)
- Wiremu Rikihana (1 June 1923 – 31 May 1930)
- Benjamin Robbins (9 March 1936 – 8 March 1943; 9 March 1943 – 8 March 1950)
- James Roberts (17 June 1947 – 31 December 1950)
- John Robertson (31 January 1946 – 31 December 1950)
- William Robinson (4 May 1869 – 9 September 1889)
- Bill Rogers (15 July 1940 – 14 July 1947; 15 July 1947 – 31 December 1950)
- James Rolland (8 July 1865 – 24 January 1866)
- Andrew Russell (2 July 1861 – 16 July 1872)
- Harold Russell (22 June 1934 – 14 July 1938)
- Henry Russell (12 July 1862 – 11 June 1885)
- William Russell (26 June 1913 – 24 September 1913)
- John Ryall (15 July 1940 – 14 July 1947; 15 July 1947 – 31 December 1950)

John Watts-Russell, sometimes referred to under the surname Russell, is listed under 'W' below

== S ==
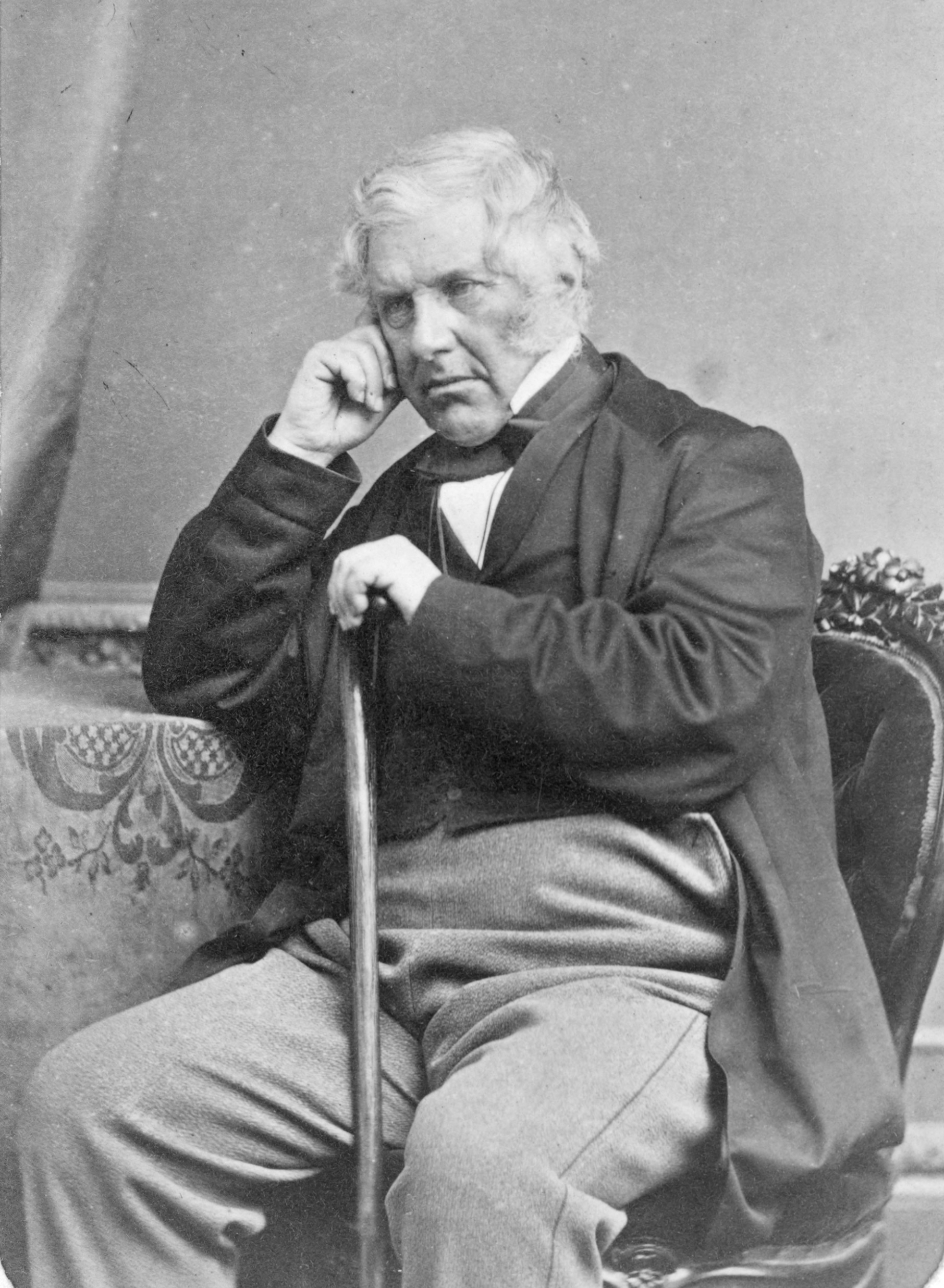
Henry Sewell was New Zealand's first premier in 1856

- Henry St. Hill (31 December 1853 – 18 March 1856)
- John Salmon (26 May 1853 – 21 December 1868)
- Oliver Samuel (22 January 1907 – 21 January 1914; 14 July 1914 – 13 July 1921; 14 July 1921 – 11 January 1925)
- Henry Scotland (24 February 1868 – 27 July 1910)
- Robert Scott (25 June 1920 – 24 June 1927; 25 June 1927 – 24 June 1934)
- Henry Sewell (2 August 1861 – 22 May 1865; 13 June 1870 – 24 November 1873)
- Arthur Seymour (8 July 1865 – 5 January 1872)
- Henry Seymour (31 December 1853 – 28 May 1860)
- Joseph Shephard (15 May 1885 – 25 October 1898)
- Samuel Shrimski (15 May 1885 – 25 June 1902)
- Thomas Sidey (10 December 1928 – 20 May 1933)
- Robert Kirkpatrick Simpson (14 July 1914 – 13 July 1921)
- John Sinclair (22 January 1907 – 21 January 1914; 7 May 1918 – 6 May 1925; 7 May 1925 – 6 May 1932)
- George John Smith (22 January 1907 – 21 January 1914; 25 June 1920 – 24 June 1927; 25 June 1927 – 24 June 1934)
- William Cowper Smith (13 December 1895 – 12 December 1902; 13 December 1902 – 12 December 1909; 13 December 1909 – 5 March 1911)
- William Snodgrass (2 September 1921 – 1 September 1928; 2 September 1928 – 1 September 1935; 2 September 1935 – 20 March 1939)
- Charles Statham (9 March 1936 – 8 March 1943; 9 March 1943 – 5 March 1946)
- Edward Cephas John Stevens (7 March 1882 – 6 June 1915)
- William Stevenson (11 June 1930 – 5 October 1935)
- William Steward (13 June 1912 – 31 October 1912)
- William Stewart (7 May 1918 – 6 May 1925; 7 May 1925 – 6 May 1932)
- William Downie Stewart (22 January 1891 – 25 November 1898)
- Robert Stokes (12 July 1862 – 24 September 1879)
- Robert Stout (3 August 1926 – 19 July 1930)
- William Swainson (26 May 1853 – 18 October 1867)
- William Swanson (15 May 1885 – 23 April 1903)

Alfred Rowland Chetham-Strode, sometimes referred to under the surname Strode, is listed under 'C' above
Alfred Lee Smith, sometimes referred to under the surname Smith, is listed under 'L' above

== T ==
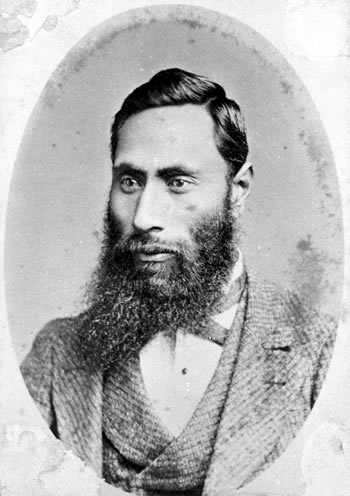
Hōri Kerei Taiaroa's disqualification from the Legislative Council in August 1880 over a technicality caused bitterness and resentment among Māori

- Hōri Kerei Taiaroa (17 February 1879 – 25 August 1880; 15 May 1885 – 4 August 1905)
- Henry Tancred (4 February 1856 – 8 May 1866)
- Maori King Mahuta Tāwhiao (22 May 1903 – 21 May 1910)
- Charles John Taylor (31 March 1869 – 26 July 1878)
- John Parkin Taylor (8 July 1865 – 18 October 1867; 4 July 1868 – 12 August 1875)
- Joseph Tetley (8 July 1867 – 19 June 1869)
- James Frederick Thompson (22 June 1950 – 31 December 1950)
- Thomas Thompson (18 March 1903 – 17 March 1910; 18 March 1910 – 17 March 1917)
- George Thomson (7 May 1918 – 6 May 1925; 7 May 1925 – 6 May 1932)
- Henare Tomoana (24 June 1898 – 20 February 1904)
- Francis Trask (18 March 1903 – 17 March 1910; 18 March 1910 – 5 April 1910)
- Jonathan Trevethick (11 June 1930 – 10 June 1937; 22 September 1937 – 17 October 1939)
- William Triggs (7 May 1918 – 6 May 1925; 7 May 1925 – 6 May 1932)
- William Tucker (22 January 1907 – 21 January 1914)
- Paramount Chief Tūreiti Te Heuheu Tūkino (7 May 1918 – 1 June 1921)
- Jeremiah Twomey (18 June 1898 – 18 June 1905)

== W ==
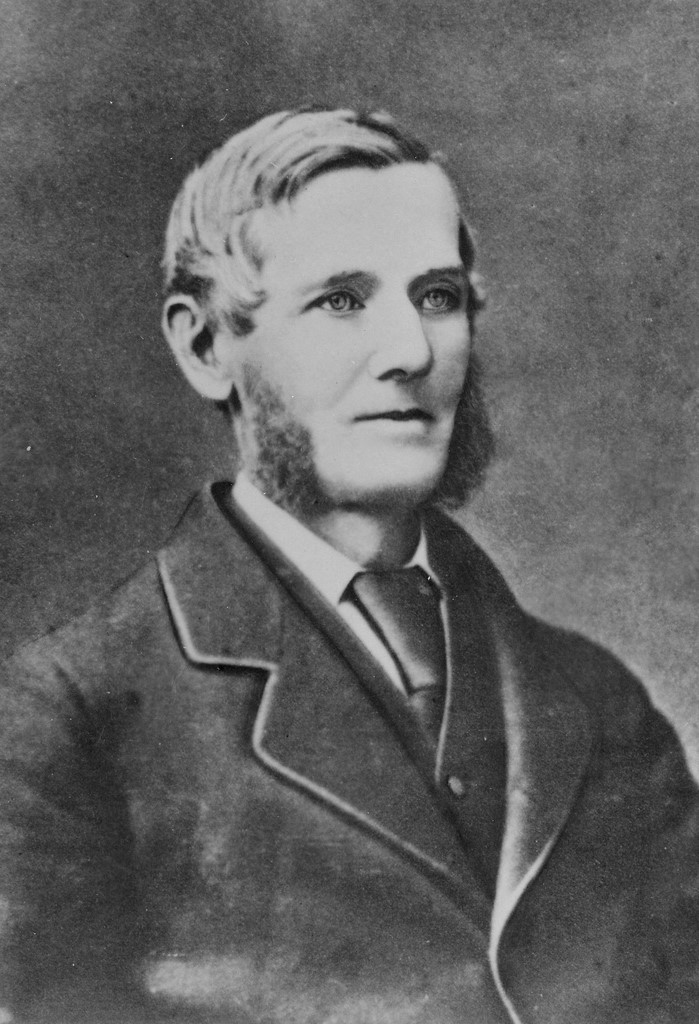
George Waterhouse was a member of the Legislative Council when he served as Premier; he was never a Member of Parliament in New Zealand

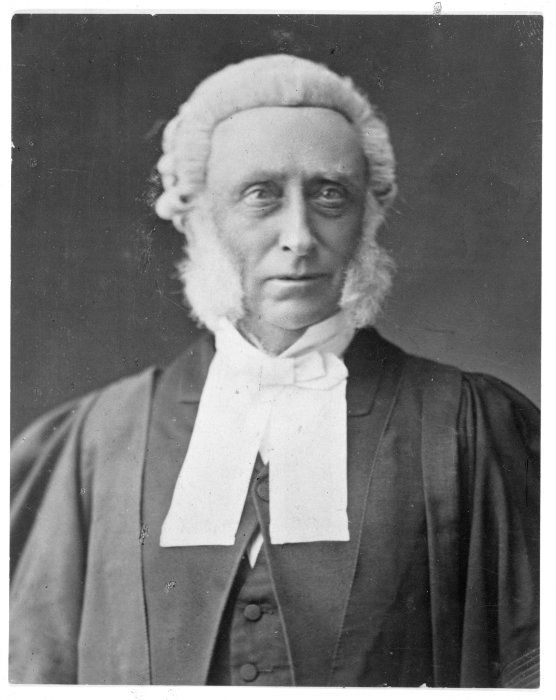
Frederick Whitaker was a member of the Legislative Council when he served as Premier; he was a Member of Parliament at other times

- Ropata Wahawaha (10 May 1887 – 1 July 1897)
- Fred Waite (22 June 1934 – 21 June 1941; 23 June 1941 – 21 June 1948; 23 June 1948 – 31 December 1950)
- Lancelot Walker (15 May 1885 – 19 May 1907)
- William Campbell Walker (15 October 1892 – 14 October 1899; 15 October 1899 – 5 January 1904)
- Henry Walton (17 October 1863 – 8 May 1866)
- Vincent Ward (22 June 1934 – 22 June 1941; 23 June 1941 – 9 February 1946)
- George Waterhouse (13 May 1870 – 30 June 1890)
- John Watts-Russell (28 December 1853 – 8 May 1854; 5 August 1858 – 18 October 1867)
- Agnes Weston (22 June 1950 – 31 December 1950)
- Thomas Shailer Weston (17 June 1926 – 20 January 1931)
- Frederick Whitaker (26 May 1853 – 19 December 1864; 8 October 1879 – 4 December 1891)
- Charles White (22 June 1950 – 31 December 1950)
- George Stoddart Whitmore (31 August 1863 – 16 March 1903)
- John Blair Whyte (22 January 1891 – 22 September 1897)
- Thomas Wigley (13 May 1870 – 11 June 1891)
- Henry Wigram (22 June 1903 – 21 June 1910; 22 June 1910 – 21 June 1917; 7 May 1918 – 12 October 1920)
- Henry Williams (7 March 1882 – 27 June 1905)
- James Williamson (13 May 1870 – 22 March 1888)
- David Wilson (22 September 1937 – 21 September 1944; 17 June 1947 – 31 December 1950)
- John Nathaniel Wilson (23 November 1877 – 22 June 1893)
- Charles Bigg Wither (15 October 1863 – 9 November 1863)
- George Witty (28 October 1925 – 28 October 1932)
- William Wood (19 December 1878 – 30 August 1884)
- Robert Wynyard (28 January 1858 – 3 November 1858)

The third Māori King Mahuta Tāwhiao, is listed under 'M', but in Wilson (1985) is listed under 'W' as Mahuta Tawhiao Potatau te Wherowhero

== Y ==
- Fred Young (8 September 1941 – 7 September 1948; 8 September 1948 – 31 December 1950)
- William Young (22 June 1950 – 31 December 1950)

== See also ==
- New Zealand Legislative Council
- Suicide squad
