= Walter Black =

Walter Black may refer to:

- Walter Evan Black Jr. (1926–2014), United States federal judge
- Walter Black (politician) (1894–1959), member of the New Zealand Legislative Council
