= James Frederick Thompson =

New Zealand solicitor and politician (1884–1966)

The Honourable James Frederick Thompson MBE
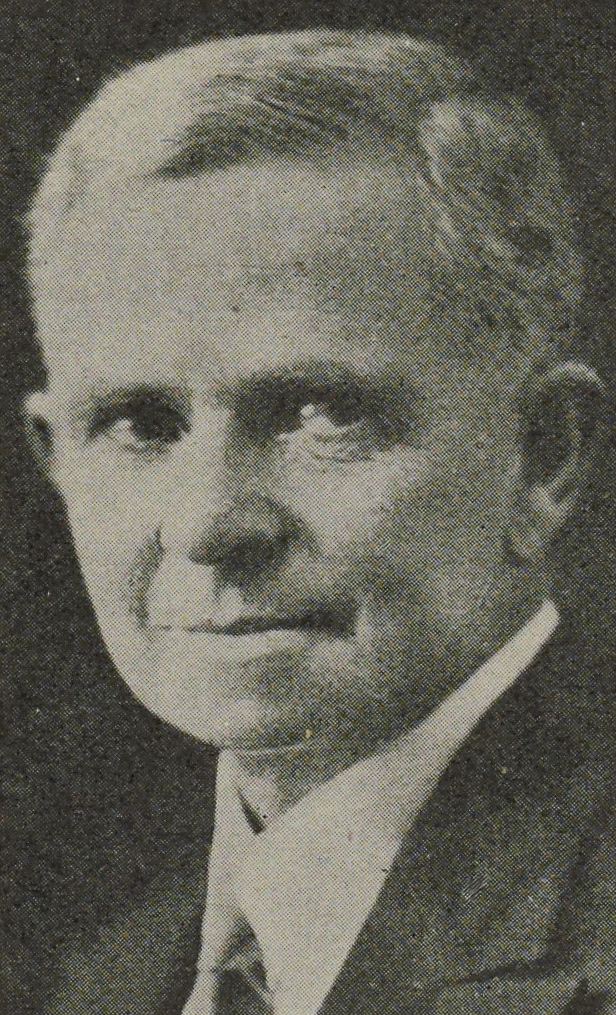

Member of the New Zealand Legislative Council
- In office 22 June – 31 December 1950

Personal details
- Born: 5 October 1884 Westport, New Zealand
- Died: 28 April 1966 (aged 81)
- Spouse: Ryda Thornton (m. 1914; died 1962)

James Frederick Thompson MBE (5 October 1884 – 28 April 1966), often referred to as J. F. Thompson, was a New Zealand solicitor and politician for the National Party.

== Early life ==
Thompson was born in 1884 in Westport. His parents, Selina "Lena" Junker and Thomas Fraser Thompson had married in 1882; his father was the first engineer for the Buller County. After his father's retirement, his parents moved from Westport to Greytown in the Wairarapa to live with his brother Sinclair Thompson who farmed in the area.

== Professional life and community involvement ==
Thompson worked for the Lands and Deeds Department in Wellington. After part time study, Thompson graduated LLB from Victoria College in Wellington in April 1912 having majored in jurisprudence, property law, criminal law, and torts. The degree was conferred by the University of New Zealand. In December 1912, he resigned from the Lands and Deeds Department to become a solicitor in the firm of Robert Ward Tate in Greytown. He also resigned his membership on the Athletics Council, where he had held positions since 1907. In early 1913, Thompson moved to Greytown. In 1918, he was admitted as a barrister of the Supreme Court.

In February 1916, Thompson was elected as one of the stewards of the Wairarapa Trotting Club. In February 1919, he was elected the club's president. Decades later, in 1964, he was made a patron of the club. By 1919, Thompson was the president of the Greytown Chamber of Commerce.

== Political career ==
Thompson was a member of the Wairarapa Hospital Board from 1919, representing the combined Greytown and Carterton boroughs. In April 1925, Thompson responded to a deputation that he would not want to stand for the Greytown mayoralty.

In March 1938, it became known that Thompson was one of five candidates for the National Party nomination for the Wairarapa electorate. He was successful over Jimmy Maher (who became an MP in 1946) and Henry Featherston Toogood (father of Selwyn Toogood). At the general election in October 1938, Thompson was beaten by the incumbent from the Labour Party, Ben Roberts.

He was appointed a member of the New Zealand Legislative Council on 22 June 1950. He was appointed as a member of the suicide squad nominated by the First National Government in 1950 to vote for the abolition of the Council. Most of the new members (like Thompson) were appointed on 22 June 1950, and served until 31 December 1950 when the Council was abolished. Abolition was voted for on 15 August 1950.

== Family and death ==
In December 1912, he became engaged to Ryda Thornton, the daughter of a solicitor from Dunedin. Thornton and Thompson married on 19 February 1914 at St Peter's Church in Wellington.

In 1916, the Thompsons bought a large Victorian house at 40 Kuratawhiti Street. The house had been built by the solicitor and former mayor of Greytown, Henry Stratton Izard, in the early 1890s (Izard was the younger brother of Charles Hayward Izard and son of Charles Beard Izard). Izard sold the house in 1906 to a Mr White following his bankruptcy, and White sold the house in 1916 to Thompson. The Thompsons would live at the house for the rest of their lives. In 1919, a 20-ha woodland was put up for sale opposite Thompson's house. He suggested to the borough council that the land be bought as a memorial park for fallen soldiers, which was acted on. After WWII, a memorial swimming pool was built in the park and the site developed into a sportsground.

In 1932, Thompson was ill for a long time. Upon medical advice, he went to Rarotonga for recuperation. Initially, he was due to leave in June but was too sick to travel. He returned in November 1932.

Thompson's father died in Blenheim during a family visit in 1924; his body was found in the Omaka River. Thompson's brother Sinclair died suddenly in his sleep in 1929 aged 40 in Carterton. Their mother died in 1938 at Masterton Hospital. Thompson died on 28 April 1966. His wife had died in 1962.

== Honours ==
In the 1956 Queen's Birthday Honours, Thompson was appointed a Member of the Order of the British Empire, in recognition of his services as president of the Greytown Chamber of Commerce.

== See also ==
- List of members of the New Zealand Legislative Council
