= Pillans =

Pillans is a surname. Notable people with the surname include:

- Albert Pillans (1869–1901), English cricketer
- Francis Pillans (1810–1889), member of the New Zealand Legislative Council
- James Pillans (1778–1864), Scottish classical scholar and educational reformer
- Mat Pillans (born 1991), South African cricketer
- Neville Stuart Pillans (1884-1964), South African botanist
- Robert Pillans (1860–1941), Scottish-born Australian politician
