= Sheriffs in New Zealand =

Officers of the Superior Courts

Sheriffs in New Zealand are officers of the Superior Courts and function as the executive arm of these courts. They are responsible for serving court processes like summonses and subpoenas in the same way that Bailiffs serve the court processes of the District Court of New Zealand. They play an important role in the execution of court orders of the High Court, Court of Appeal and the Supreme Court of New Zealand. Sheriffs are forbidden from acting as barristers, solicitors, or acting as agent of a law firm while employed in the role of Sheriff.

Sheriffs in New Zealand have had various different roles and responsibilities in different eras of the country and today Sheriffs have a dramatically diminished role compared to the past.

== Today ==
Today the role of Sheriff and court Registrar are a dual position where the role of sheriff is automatically given to anyone who has gained the position of Registrar, as the Senior Courts Act 2016 states that each "Registrar is also a Sheriff for New Zealand". Deputy Registrars and other officials may also be appointed as Deputy Sheriffs to help and assist Sheriffs.

Sheriffs have the powers to serve the court such as summonses, to enforce the orders of the court and the power to arrest a person in accordance with an order of the High Court. Sheriffs can ask Deputy Sheriffs, Bailiffs, any Sheriff's officers that they employ to help them in their duties, however in practice, the police often carry out the functions of sheriffs on their behalf.

The duties of Sheriffs can extend from selling properties owned by indebted people on the behalf of the High Court (like an apartment block) or performing constitutionally required ceremonial duties like escorting the Chief Justice when they are opening a new session of the New Zealand Parliament.

== History ==
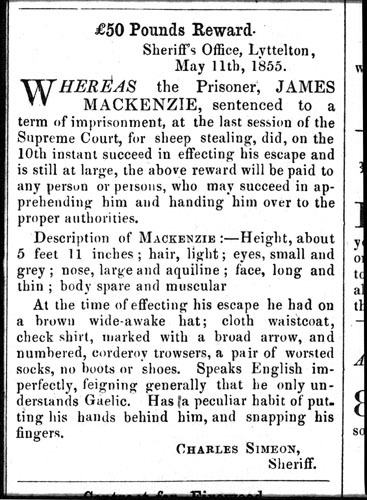
Sheriff Charles Simeon's reward poster offering a £50 reward for the capture of James Mckenzie after he escaped from gaol published in the Lyttelton Times in May 1855

At the beginning of New Zealand's colonial history, sheriffs were appointed by the governor to enforce orders of the court, starting with Sheriff James Coates, who was appointed by Governor William Hobson to be the "Sheriff of the Colony of New Zealand and its Dependencies" in July 1841. Sheriffs at this time had the responsibility of upholding capital punishments by finding a willing executioner and organising the execution event, as was first overseen by Coates in 1842. After Coates was joined by other individuals appointed as sheriff in 1842, he was alternatively referred to as the "High Sheriff" in order to show his seniority compared to the other "Sub-Sheriffs".

Further, between 1840 and 1853 they had the additional responsibility of building and running local gaols (jails) and hire gaolers (jailers) to manage the prisoners. The underfunded and overcrowded gaols were of such poor condition that responsibility for running these gaols were handed over to the recently established provincial governments in 1853. For a period of time the responsibility for funding the local sheriff's offices was also handed over to the various provincial governments throughout the country, although outlaw James McKenzie was still able escape from Lyttelton Gaol on at least two occasions due to the poor condition of the gaol in 1855.

Alexander McDonald resigned from the job of sheriff of Nelson in 1843 after only a few months after he received a letter from the Colonial Secretary reminding him that his job was to conduct the business of the courts and to not organise public meetings and engage in other endeavours that were not in the job description.

After 1853, with the signing of the New Zealand Constitution Act 1852, sheriffs also acted as the returning officers in both provincial and national elections. In July 1861, Sheriff Shafto Harrison created controversy when he was elected to the Wellington Provincial Government while also being employed as the Sheriff of Wanganui who had electoral overseeing duties.

To help with these increased duties, a number of sheriffs in 1859 were given the assistance of a deputy sheriff to help them complete matters of the sheriff's office.

In 1866 there was considerable scandal when the former sheriff of Otago, Robert Henry Forman, was arrested on board a ship leaving for Sydney shortly after he resigned and was charged with unlawfully taking money for his own use. Further scandal was created when he was granted a discharge without conviction. Further scandal came in 1872 with the appointment of William Henry Eyes as sheriff of Marlborough, who was a convicted rapist and got caught engaging in adultery not long after he became sheriff.

== Lists of sheriffs ==
=== New Ulster and New Munster ===
Sheriff	Shrievalty	Office	Assumed office	Left office
James Coates	New Zealand	Auckland	July 1841	January 1842
Thomas Beckham	North New Ulster	Russell	January 1842	March 1844
James Coates	Central New Ulster	Auckland	January 1842	September 1843
Michael Murphy	Southern New Ulster	Wellington	January 1842	January 1843
Henry St. Hill	Southern New Ulster	Wellington	January 1843	1853
Alexander McDonald	North New Munster	Nelson	March 1843	October 1843
Percival Berrey	Central New Ulster	Auckland	September 1843	1853
F. Marshall	North New Munster	Nelson	December 1843	April 1845
Joseph Dixon	North New Ulster	Russell	March 1844	February 1845
Donald Sinclair	North New Munster	Nelson	April 1845	February 1848
John Tinline	North New Munster	Nelson	February 1848	December 1852
Alfred Rowland Chetham-Strode	South New Munster	Dunedin	August 1850	1853
Edward Wright	Central New Munster	Lyttelton	April 1851	July 1853

=== Auckland ===
==== Sheriffs ====
Sheriff	Shrievalty	Assumed office	Left office
Thomas Beckham	Auckland	1853	January 1855
Loughlin O'Brien	Auckland	January 1855	March 1865
Henry Colin Balneavis	Auckland	March 1865	August 1876
Major Edward Lister Green	Auckland	August 1876	February 1877
Colonel Theodore Haultain	Auckland	February 1877	August 1878
Edward Willcocks	Auckland	August 1878	October 1880
Hudson Williamson	Auckland	October 1880	
Major Edward Lister Green	Auckland	November 1882	April 1887
Henry Clinton Salkeld Baddeley	Auckland	July 1887	May 1888
Major Frederick John William Gascoyne	Auckland	September 1888	June 1891
C. J. Hewlett	Auckland		

==== Deputies ====
Deputy	Shrievalty	Assumed office	Left office
Hudson Williamson	Auckland		October 1880
George William Basley	Auckland	October 1880	

=== Taranaki ===
Title	Sheriff	Shrievalty	Assumed office	Left office
Sheriff	Josiah Flight	New Plymouth	1853	April 1868
Deputy	Samuel Popham King	New Plymouth	August 1859	
Deputy	W. M. Crompton	New Plymouth	August 1866	
Sheriff	Charles Douglas Whitcombe	New Plymouth		August 1878
Sheriff	Charles Edward Rawson	New Plymouth	August 1878	
Sheriff	A. H. Holmes	New Plymouth	March 1897	
Sheriff	C. A. Wray	Carlyle	February 1877	

=== Hawke's Bay ===
Sheriff	Shrievalty	Assumed office	Left office
Henry Robert Russell	Napier	October 1857	
G. S. Cooper	Napier		1866
E. L. Green	Napier	November 1866	
John Thomas Tylee	Napier		August 1878
Duncan Guy	Napier	August 1878	
E. C. Cutten	Napier		

=== Wellington ===
==== Sheriffs ====
Sheriff	Shrievalty	Assumed office	Left office
Henry St. Hill	Wellington	1853	May 1854
William Fox	Wellington	May 1854	1855
Henry St. Hill	Wellington	1855	January 1864
Henry Shafto Harrison	Wanganui	July 1857	July 1861
Herbert Samuel Wardell	Wairarapa	October 1863	April 1885
Thomas Harper	Wanganui	July 1861	November 1870
Charles Dudley Ward	Wellington	January 1864	January 1866
James Coutts Crawford	Wellington	January 1866	July 1878
Walter Lawry Buller	Wanganui	January 1871	July 1873
Ebenezer Baker	Wellington		August 1878
Alexander Sutherland Allan	Wellington	August 1878	
Ebenezer Baker	Wellington		July 1891
L. Cooper	Wellington	July 1891	
Walter A. Hawkins	Wellington	January 1914	
E. Rawson	Wairarapa		
M. Foley	Wairarapa		
James Miller	Wairarapa		December 1921
James Theophilus Bishop	Wairarapa	December 1921	

==== Deputies ====
Deputy	Shrievalty	Assumed office	Left office
Deputy D. S. Durie	Wanganui		
Walter A. Hawkins	Wellington	1894	December 1907
Arthur Stubbs	Wellington	December 1907	

=== Nelson ===
==== Sheriffs ====
Sheriff	Shrievalty	Assumed office	Left office
Benjamin Walmsley	Nelson	March 1853	January 1862
Maxwell Bury	Nelson	November 1861	April 1863
William Wells	Nelson	April 1863	May 1863
Benjamin Walmsley	Nelson	May 1863	February 1870
Joseph Giles	Westland North	April 1868	January 1876
Thomas Brunner	Nelson	February 1870	February 1872
Lowther Broad	Nelson	February 1872	December 1875
Charles Broad	Westland North	January 1876	
William Horton Revell	Westland North		
John Turnbull	Nelson		November 1882
Alfred Greenfield	Nelson	November 1882	
Wilson Heaps	Nelson	1903	March 1924
Frank Mitchell	Nelson	June 1924	
Charles William Carver	Nelson		

==== Deputies ====
Deputy	Shrievalty	Assumed office	Left office
Alfred Greenfield	Nelson		February 1863
Deputy Charles Broad	Reefton		
Wilson Heaps	Nelson	1901	1903
Frank Mitchell	Nelson	1922	

=== Marlborough ===
Sheriff	Shrievalty	Assumed office	Left office
Thomas William Downes	Picton	November 1861	October 1866
Dr Stephen Lunn Muller	Blenheim	July 1866	February 1872
Deputy Joshua Green	Picton	May 1871	
William Henry Eyes	Blenheim	February 1872	May 1873
Cyrus Goulter	Blenheim	May 1873	January 1879

=== Canterbury ===
==== Sheriffs ====
Sheriff	Shrievalty	Assumed office	Left office
Charles Simeon	Lyttelton	November 1853	August 1855
Henry Tancred	Lyttelton	August 1855	May 1856
Charles Christopher Bowen	Lyttelton	May 1856	December 1856
John Hall	Lyttelton	December 1856	January 1862
Alexander Back	Christchurch	November 1861	January 1878
Frederick de Carteret Malet	Christchurch	August 1878	
A. R. Blosam	Christchurch		November 1882
Alexander Lean	Christchurch	November 1882	
Richmond Beetham	Timaru		

===== Westland =====
Westland started off as a semi-autonomous area of Canterbury and then directly administered by the central government, but did get independence for a short time in the mid 1870s as Westland Province. Grey County to the north was administered by Nelson Province.

Sheriff	Shrievalty	Assumed office	Left office
George Samuel Sale	Westland, Canterbury Province	November 1865	September 1866
Gerard George Fitzgerald	Westland County	September 1866	February 1878
William Alexander Spence	Westland County		August 1878
Alfred Hassal King	Westland County	August 1878	
Charles William Carver	Westland County	1925	1927

==== Deputies ====
Deputy	Shrievalty	Assumed office	Left office
Jas. Davis	Christchurch		December 1879
Andrew E. Bloxam	Christchurch	December 1879	

=== Otago ===
Sheriff	Shrievalty	Assumed office	Left office
Alfred Rowland Chetham-Strode	Dunedin	1853	June 1857
John Gillies	Dunedin	June 1857	June 1863
Robert Henry Forman	Dunedin	June 1863	January 1866
Alfred Rowland Chetham-Strode	Dunedin	January 1866	January 1868
Alfred William Smith	Dunedin	January 1868	May 1868
Isaac Newton Watt	Dunedin	May 1868	August 1878
Deputy William Murison	Dunedin	May 1869	April 1877
Edward ffrancis Ward	Dunedin	August 1878	January 1879
Colin McKenzie Gordon	Dunedin	January 1879	May 1901

=== Southland ===
==== Sheriffs ====
Sheriff	Shrievalty	Assumed office	Left office
Matthew Price	Invercargill	February 1863	October 1865
Henry McCulloch	Invercargill	October 1865	August 1878
John Turnbull	Invercargill	January 1875	
William Stuart	Invercargill	August 1878	June 1879
Arthur C. Henderson	Invercargill	June 1879	December 1879
Henry McCulloch	Invercargill	December 1879	April 1890
Walter Martin	Invercargill	April 1890	
J. R. Colter	Invercargill		March 1917
Cecil John Hewlett	Invercargill	March 1917	

==== Deputies ====
Deputy	Shrievalty	Assumed office	Left office
John Turnbull	Invercargill	October 1883	
Harry Owens Williams	Invercargill	January 1891	December 1891
John Lillicrap	Invercargill	December 1891	
F. Knight	Invercargill		
