= William Bolt =

New Zealand politician

William Mouat Bolt (1838 – 29 April 1907) was a member of the New Zealand Legislative Council. He was a council member from 15 October 1892 to 15 October 1899; 16 October 1899 to 15 October 1906; and 16 October 1906 to 29 April 1907, when he died aged 68 years. He was the president of the National Liberal Association.

He was from Dunedin.
