= Carey Carrington =

New Zealand politician (1877–1966)

Carey John Carrington Jr. MLC (1877 – 14 December 1966) was a member of the New Zealand Legislative Council from 17 June 1926 to 16 June 1933; then 17 June 1933 to 16 June 1940, when his term ended. He was appointed by the Reform Government.

He was born in Auckland in the spring of 1877, the eldest son of Carey John Carrington Sr., who had been born in 1844 in Wokingham, Berkshire, and Alicia Mary Josephine Lonergan. In 1903, he married Elizabeth McCashin. He died in Auckland on 14 December 1966.
