= William Nurse =

Member of the New Zealand Legislative Council

William Hugh Nurse (1832 – 23 May 1885) was a member of the New Zealand Legislative Council from 27 June 1868 to 23 May 1885, when he died aged 53.

He was from Southland.
