= Patrick Joseph O'Kane =

New Zealand politician

The Honourable Patrick Joseph O'Kane JP
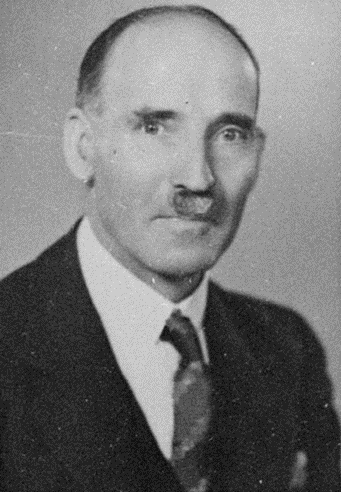

Member of the Legislative Council
- In office 8 September 1941 – 31 December 1950

Personal details
- Born: 16 March 1884 County Londonderry, Ireland
- Died: 21 March 1970 (aged 86) Hastings, New Zealand
- Party: Labour Party
- Spouse: Genevieve Moroney (m. 1916; died 1962)

Patrick Joseph O'Kane JP (16 March 1884 – 21 March 1970) was a member of the New Zealand Legislative Council from 8 September 1941 to 31 December 1950, when the council was abolished.

== Biography ==
O'Kane was born in County Londonderry, Ireland, on 16 March 1884, the third son of Thomas Kane, and was educated at St Columba's School in Ballerin. After six years working in the wine and spirit business, he migrated to New Zealand in 1907. He lived for two years on Maraekakaho Station, where he acquired knowledge of farming. He then worked as a departmental foreman for Thomas Borthwick and Sons at their freezing works in Pakipaki, Belfast, and Waitara, and was a union secretary for the Pakipaki, Tomoana, North British, and Whakatu freezing works.

On 1 May 1916, O'Kane married Genevieve Moroney at the Pakipaki Catholic Church. He served overseas during the latter stages of World War I, from 1917 to 1919, with the Otago Infantry Regiment of the New Zealand Expeditionary Force, rising to the rank of corporal (and temporary sergeant).

O'Kane left Borthwicks in 1920 and took up sheepfarming in the Wairoa area. He was appointed a justice of the peace in 1924, and was president of the Wairoa Farmers' Union from 1937 to 1938. He was president of the Frasertown branch of the Labour Party from 1937, and was a government appointee on the Wairoa Harbour Board and the Gisborne Land Board. He also served as an executive member of the Primary Production Council, and was a commander in the Home Guard during World War II.

O'Kane was appointed by the First Labour Government to the Legislative Council, serving from 8 September 1941 to 7 September 1948, and from 8 September 1948 to 31 December 1950, when the council was abolished. In 1953, he was awarded the Queen Elizabeth II Coronation Medal.

O'Kane died in Hastings on 21 March 1970, having been predeceased by his wife in 1962.
