= Francis Pillans =

New Zealand politician

Francis Scott Pillans (1 January 1810 – 12 December 1889) was a member of the New Zealand Legislative Council from 24 January 1863 to 28 July 1873, when he was disqualified for absence.

Pillans was from Edinburgh. Born in 1810, he was the fourth son of James Pillan of Myres Castle. He received his education from Edinburgh High School and finished this in Lauenburg in Germany. He arrived in Dunedin in 1849 on the Moultan. He was described as a runholder and pisciculturist. He died at his residence in Inch Clutha, Otago aged 80 years.
