= Ralph Richardson (politician born 1812) =

Ralph Richardson (1812–1897/1898) was a Member of the New Zealand Legislative Council. He lived in New Zealand for less than a decade, and retired to Devon in England, and later to London.

== Biography ==
Richardson was born in Capenhurst, Cheshire, England in 1812. He was educated at Chester Grammar School, at the University of Edinburgh, graduating with an MD, and Downing College, Cambridge (from where he graduated MA and became a fellow); Richardson never practised as a doctor, although he was a fellow of the Royal College of Physicians of Edinburgh. Aged 28, he married Marie Louise Seymour, a daughter of George Turner Seymour of Wraxall, Somerset. They emigrated to New Zealand in 1851 on the Maori and first settled in Meadowbank near Blenheim. Arthur Seymour, Marie's brother, accompanied them to New Zealand and settled in Picton. Henry Seymour, who also returned to Nelson on that ship, was unrelated. By 1854, the Richardsons were living in Nelson.

Richardson was appointed to the Legislative Council on 31 December 1853. He was a Member of the Executive Council in the first Fox Ministry from 24 May to 2 June 1856. He resigned from the Legislative Council on 13 December 1856. The Richardsons returned to England in 1858. According to Henry Sewell's diary, "Mrs Richarson like[d] New Zealand, but the want of Servants [was] the one intolerable grievance." They bought an estate in Devon where they lived until the 1880s. His wife died in 1880, and he later moved to London. After his son Ralph (who was a New Zealand MHR from 1871 to 1873) died in Nelson on 22 December 1889, he took in his daughter-in-law and her two small girls. Richardson died in 1897 or 1898.
