= William Swainson (lawyer) =

New Zealand lawyer and politician (1809–1884)

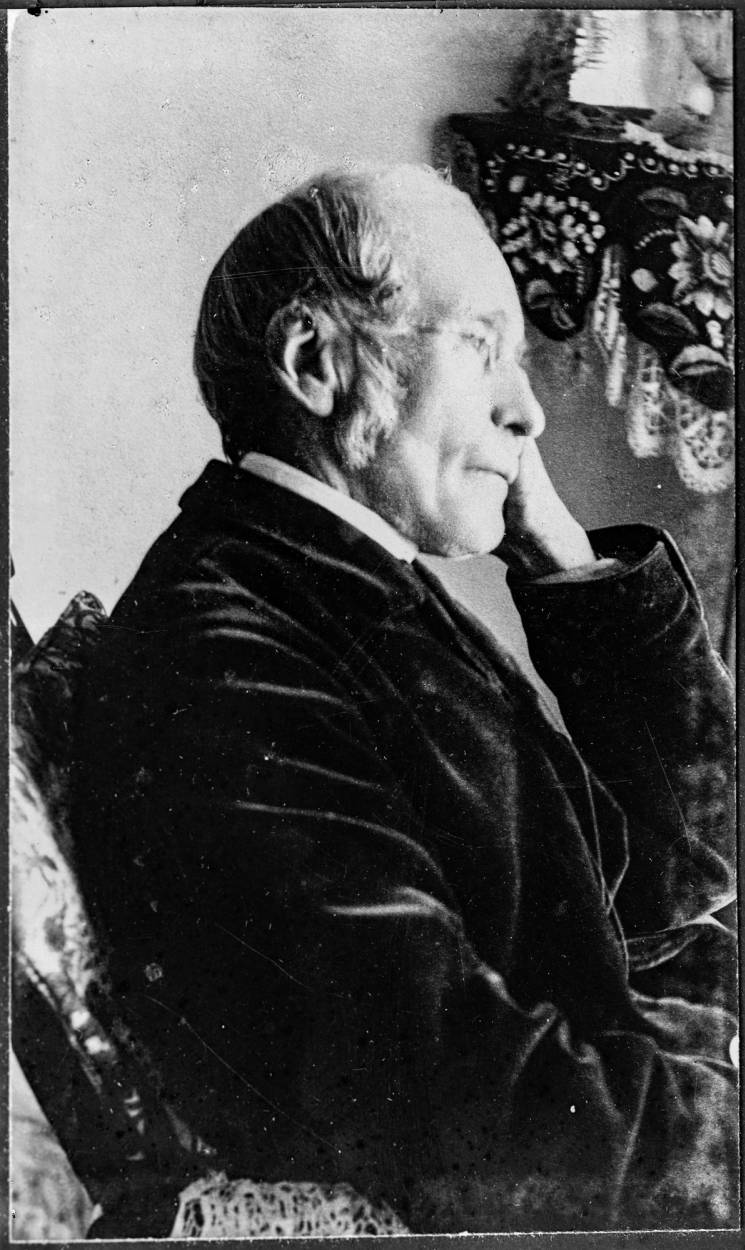

2nd Attorney-General of the Crown Colony of New Zealand
- In office 1841 – 7 May 1856
- Monarch: Victoria
- Preceded by: Francis Fisher
- Succeeded by: Frederick Whitaker

1st Speaker of the Legislative Council
- In office 1854–1855
- Succeeded by: Thomas Bartley

Personal details
- Born: 25 April 1809 Lancaster, England
- Died: 1 December 1884 (aged 75) Auckland, New Zealand

William Swainson (25 April 1809 – 1 December 1884) became the second, and last, Attorney-General of the Crown colony of New Zealand and instrumental in setting up the legal system of New Zealand. He was the first Speaker of the New Zealand Legislative Council.

== Early life ==
Swainson was born in Lancaster, England on 25 April 1809 and educated in Lancaster Grammar School. His legal education was in Middle Temple and he was called to the bar in 1838.

== HMS Tyne ==
He worked in conveyancing for only a few years, and with this relatively little experience was appointed to be Attorney-General of New Zealand in 1841. The ship HMS Tyne left England taking Swainson and two other prominent figures in the future of New Zealand law, the Hon Sir William Martin, who was to become the first Chief Justice, and Thomas Outhwaite, who was to become Registrar of the Supreme Court in Auckland, to New Zealand. On the ship the three men began to draft "in simple, concise and intelligible language" a new system of laws which they planned to be ideal for the new colony of New Zealand.

== Legal and political activities ==
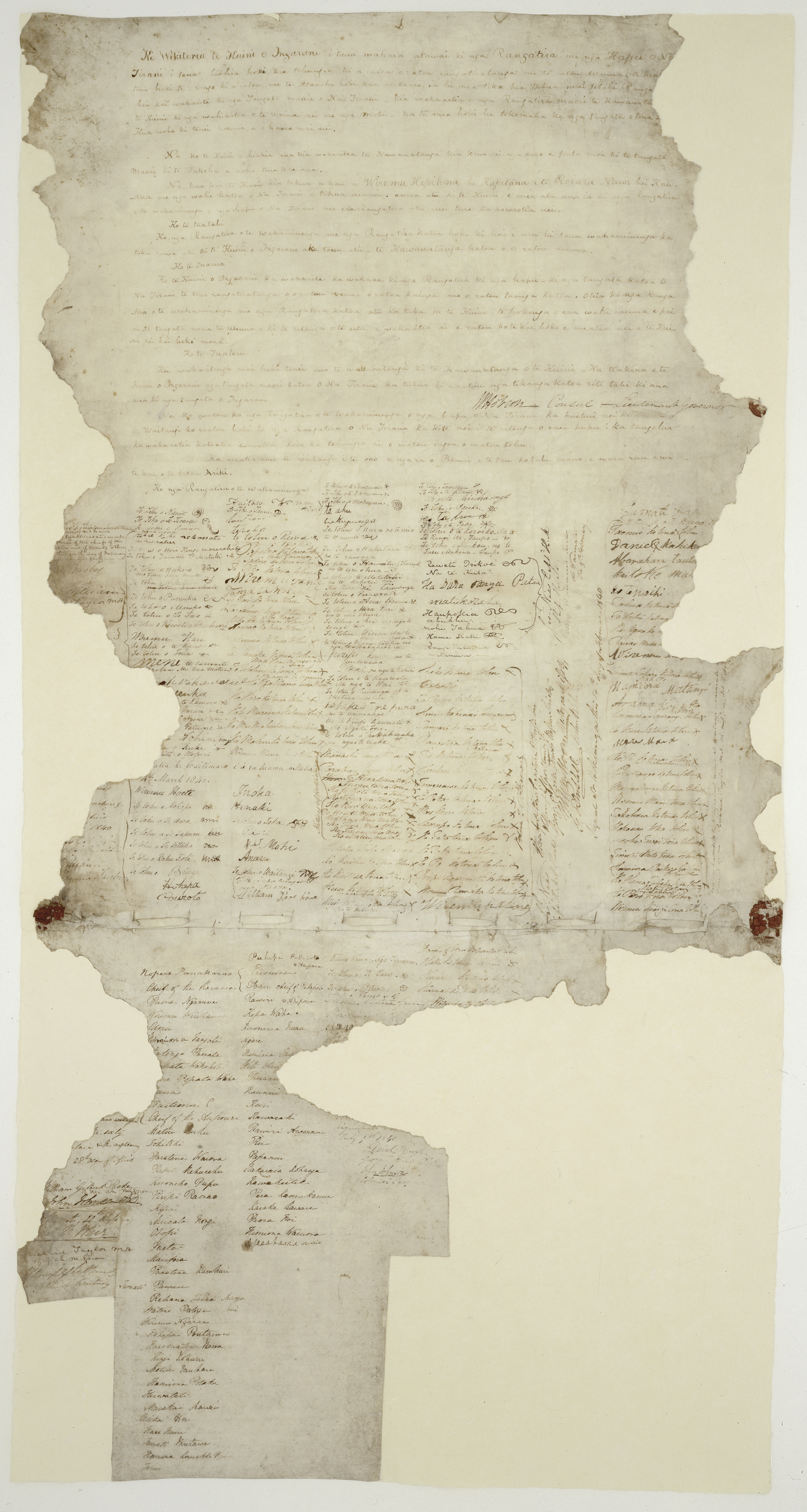
The Treaty of Waitangi

Within six months of their arrival in New Zealand on 25 September 1841, 19 enactments had been passed creating the basis of governance in the new colony. Swainson frequently defended the interests of Māori on the issue of land claims from settlers, notably over disputes concerning the Treaty of Waitangi, which had been signed in 1840.

George Grey became governor in November 1845. Swainson, Martin and Grey together formulated components of the New Zealand Constitution Act 1852. Swainson remained Attorney-General until 7 May 1856 when responsible government began in New Zealand. He was replaced as Attorney-General by Frederick Whitaker. Swainson was appointed to the subsequent New Zealand Legislative Council (the upper house) on 26 May 1853 and became its first Speaker, from 16 May 1854. He remained in this position for over a year, to 8 August 1855, when he was also replaced by Frederick Whitaker. Swainson remained a member of the Legislative Council until 18 October 1867 when he was disqualified for absence.

== Relations with Maori ==
Governor Hobson had earlier declared British sovereignty over the North Island. On 21 May 1840 concerned that the French might do so, he declared sovereignty by right of discovery over the South Island and Stewart Island. This was despite the Treaty of Waitangi not being signed by all Maori chiefs in these areas. At an Executive Council meeting, 29 December 1842, Swainson said that those parts of New Zealand where Maori chiefs refused to sign the Treaty or had not been asked to sign were not British territory. Willoughby Shortland, the Colonial Secretary for New Zealand, who was also at the meeting, asked Swainson to prepare a paper about this. Swainson said it was possible that English law and Maori customary law might coexist. Lord Edward Stanley, Secretary of the Colonies, was angry with the paper when it arrived in England. Stanley's Undersecretary, James Stephen, said that although the declaration of sovereignty might be an unjust breach of faith, it should stand.

HMS Tyne arrived in Auckland on 25 September 1841 and Swainson bought 6 acres (2.4 ha) of land at Judges Bay, Parnell at Taurarua in Auckland. He then erected his pre-fabricated house there which he had brought with him on the Tyne. A hospital which treated Maori was erected nearby. A Maori man, Mohi Horowhenua te Puatau, was a patient there. Mohi's wife and child died and Mohi was employed by Swainson as a boatman and handyman. Mohi was to accompany Swainson from then on for the rest of Swainson's life, including at Wellington synod meetings and in a canoe trip around Waiheke Island, where Mohi's hapū was and his wife buried. In 1880 Mohi lived in a whare (a Maori house) 30 yards (27 m) east of Swainson's house. Swaison described Mohi in his will as his "old friend". When Mohi was on his deathbed in 1890 Isa Outhwaite, the daughter of Thomas Outhwaite, Swainson's old friend and Court Registrar, was at the bedside. Governor Grey had visited Mohi daily during his last days and Grey led Mohi's funeral procession. In the words of Swainson's biographer, John Stacpoole, Mohi was buried "no more than a leap away from Swainson's grave.". Swainson died a bachelor in Auckland, on 1 December 1884, and is buried at St. Stephen's Cemetery.

== Ecclesiastical activities ==
Bishop Selwyn approached him to help create the basis of an independent church, tied to the Church of England, by drafting its constitution, although the church never became the established religion. In 1866 Swainson became chancellor of the Anglican Diocese of Auckland.

== See also ==
William Swainson is commonly confused with the naturalist William Swainson who also arrived in New Zealand in 1841.

== Notes ==
Political offices
| New creation | Speaker of the New Zealand Legislative Council; 1854–1855 | Succeeded by Frederick Whitaker |
