= Walter Black (politician) =

New Zealand politician

The Honourable Walter Black MLC
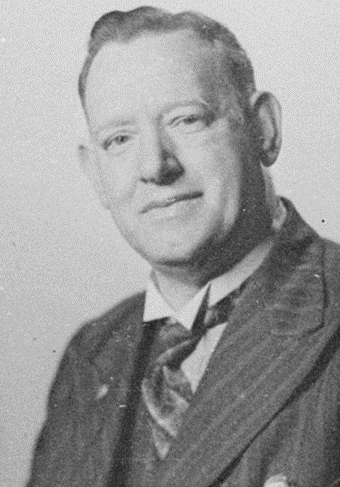

Member of the Legislative Council
- In office 8 September 1941 – 31 December 1950

Personal details
- Born: 1894 New Zealand
- Died: August 19, 1959 (aged 64–65) New Zealand
- Party: Labour Party

Walter Black (1894 – 19 August 1959) was a member of the New Zealand Legislative Council from 8 September 1941 to 7 September 1948 and 8 September 1948 to 31 December 1950.

He was from Nelson. He was appointed by the First Labour Government.
