= Edmund Bellairs =

British military officer and politician (1823–1896)

Edmund Hooke Wilson Bellairs (1823 – 14 September 1896) was a member of the New Zealand Legislative Council.

Bellairs was born in Norfolk and arrived in Dunedin in 1852. He was a member of the Legislative Council in Auckland from 31 December 1853 to 17 June 1856, when his membership lapsed due to absence. He left New Zealand about 1856 and afterwards lived mainly in France. Copies and reproductions of Bellairs' pencil drawings and watercolours of historic interest are held at the Hocken Collections.

Bellairs died 14 September 1896 at Newlands, Hatfield, Hertfordshire.
