= William Kenny (New Zealand politician) =

New Zealand politician

William Henry Kenny (1811 – 17 August 1880) was a member of the New Zealand Legislative Council from 26 May 1853 to 17 August 1880, when he died. He was buried at St Stephen's Cemetery in Parnell.

He was from Auckland. He was one of the first 13 members appointed to the Legislative Council.
