= John Salmon (politician) =

New Zealand politician (1808–1873)

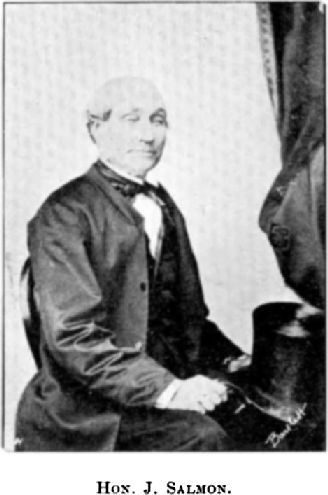
Hon John Salmon

John Salmon (1808 – 26 March 1873) was an inaugural member of the New Zealand Legislative Council and a merchant.

== Early life ==
Salmon was born in 1808 in Aberdeen, Scotland. Like his brother David, he was engaged in shipping trade; John Salmon went to sea from age 14. His brother owned the 3,000 acres (1,200 ha) Moturoa Island near Kerikeri in New Zealand but drowned at Kororareka (now known as Russell) in 1839. John Salmon came to New Zealand in late 1841 and first arrived in Wellington, with the purpose of settling his brother's estate.

== Life in New Zealand ==
Salmon traded on the east coast of the North Island, and between New Zealand and Australia. After some time, he based himself in Auckland, which at the time was the country's capital. Some obituaries incorrectly state he built the windmill on Karangahape Road above central Auckland.

In May 1852, an act allowed for two-thirds of the membership of provincial legislative councils to be elected. Salmon was one of the three successful candidates for the Auckland City electorate (the other two were Frederick Whitaker and William Brown). Before this provincial legislative council could first meet, news was received in December 1852 that the New Zealand Constitution Act 1852 had been passed by the Parliament of the United Kingdom; this established different governance arrangements. No meeting of the elected members was ever called.

Salmon was a member of the Legislative Council that was established through the Constitution Act. There were 16 initial members in the upper house who first met in May 1854 and Salmon was 1 of the 6 Aucklanders who had been appointed. His membership lasted from 26 May 1853 to 21 December 1868, when he was disqualified for absence. He stopped attending the council's sessions when parliament moved to Wellington.

== Family and death ==
On 26 January 1853, Salmon married Alice Porter at St Thomas Tamaki in the suburb of Kohimarama. She was the only daughter of William Field Porter, a fellow coastal trader. They had two daughters. Their eldest daughter, Agnes Amy (1854–1916), married William Hall at their residence "Mossley Bank" in Ellerslie on 8 October 1872. Their younger daughter, Alice Lila (1855–1922), married Charles Shipherd on 5 June 1880 at St Peter's Church in Onehunga.

Salmon died at his residence "Mossley Bank" near the Harp of Erin (the junction of Great South Road and Main Highway in Ellerslie) on 26 March 1873. He was buried at Symonds Street Cemetery the following day. Four months later, on 13 July 1873, his eldest daughter gave birth to her first son at "Mossley Bank".
