= Alfred Rowland Chetham-Strode =

Alfred Rowland Chetham-Strode (10 May 1823 – 13 May 1890) was a New Zealand colonial public servant and politician.

== Life ==
Chetham-Strode was born in Fareham in 1823, the son of Admiral Sir Edward Chetham-Strode, K.C.B., K.C.H., of Southill, Somersetshire. In 1841 he went to New Zealand, when he settled at Wellington. Entering the Government service in 1846, Chetham-Strode was appointed Inspector of Armed Constabulary, of which body he had command. He also received a war medal for services rendered during encounters with natives at Horokiwi, Porirua, Wanganui, and other places.

In 1849 he was appointed Resident Magistrate in Otago, and occupied the position from 1860 to 1862 of Sub-Treasurer of Otago; was Curator of Intestate Estates for some six years, and Sheriff and Commissioner of Native Reserves. He was also the first Returning Officer and Registration Officer after the Constitution Act was granted to New Zealand. Elected by the trustees, he was vice-president of the Savings Bank from its formation. On 8 July 1865, Chetham-Strode was appointed to the Legislative Council, but resigned on 30 November 1867. In conjunction with the Hon. Sir Julius Vogel, he was the means of establishing the Benevolent Asylum.

Chetham-Strode was a member of Council of the University of Otago in 1869, and represented the Council at the tercentenary of the University of Edinburgh in 1884. In 1873 Chetham-Strode resigned the duties of Resident Magistrate in Dunedin, and in 1882 he returned to England, and settled at Norwood, where he engaged in philanthropic works. He married, in 1851, Miss Emily Borton, and died on 13 May 1890.

In 1874 his daughter Ellen Isabel Strode married William Fraser, his business partner.
