= Henry St. Hill =

New Zealand politician

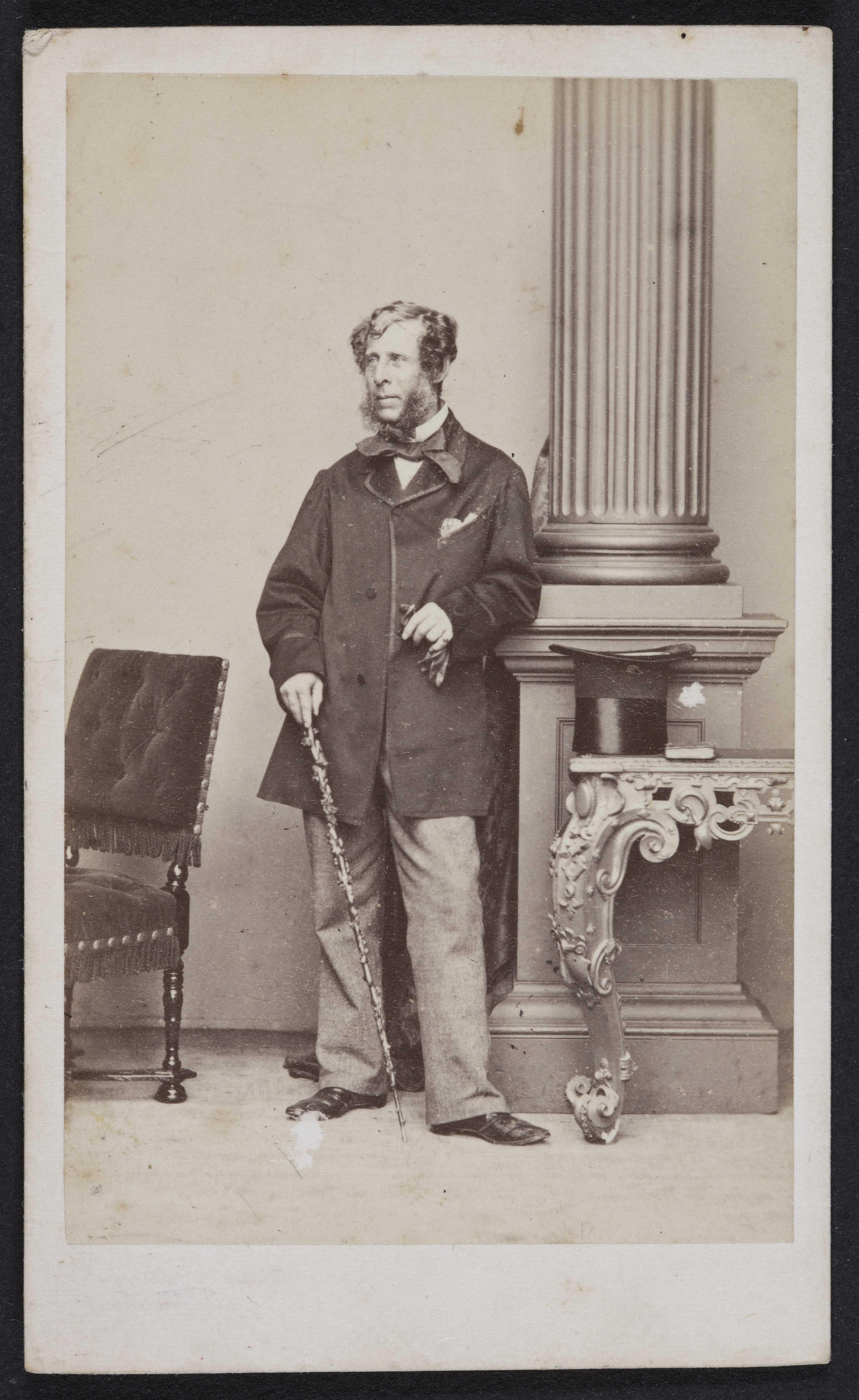

Member of the New Zealand Legislative Council
- In office 1853–1856

Personal details
- Born: James Henry St. Hill; 1807 Trinidad
- Died: 5 June 1866 (aged 58–59) London, England

James Henry St. Hill (1807 – 5 June 1866) was a New Zealand politician, magistrate, and architect.

== Early life ==
James Henry St. Hill was born at Trinidad, West Indies, in 1807. His father, Henry Charles, was a Devonshire man who served in Her Majesty's Ordnance Department in the West Indies, Ceylon, and Hong Kong. St. Hill was educated at Christ's Hospital in London.

In 1839 St. Hill was involved in the Church of England committee that appointed George Augustus Selwyn as Bishop of New Zealand.

Henry St. Hill came to Wellington aboard the Adelaide alongside his wife, arriving 7 March 1840.

== Civil service ==
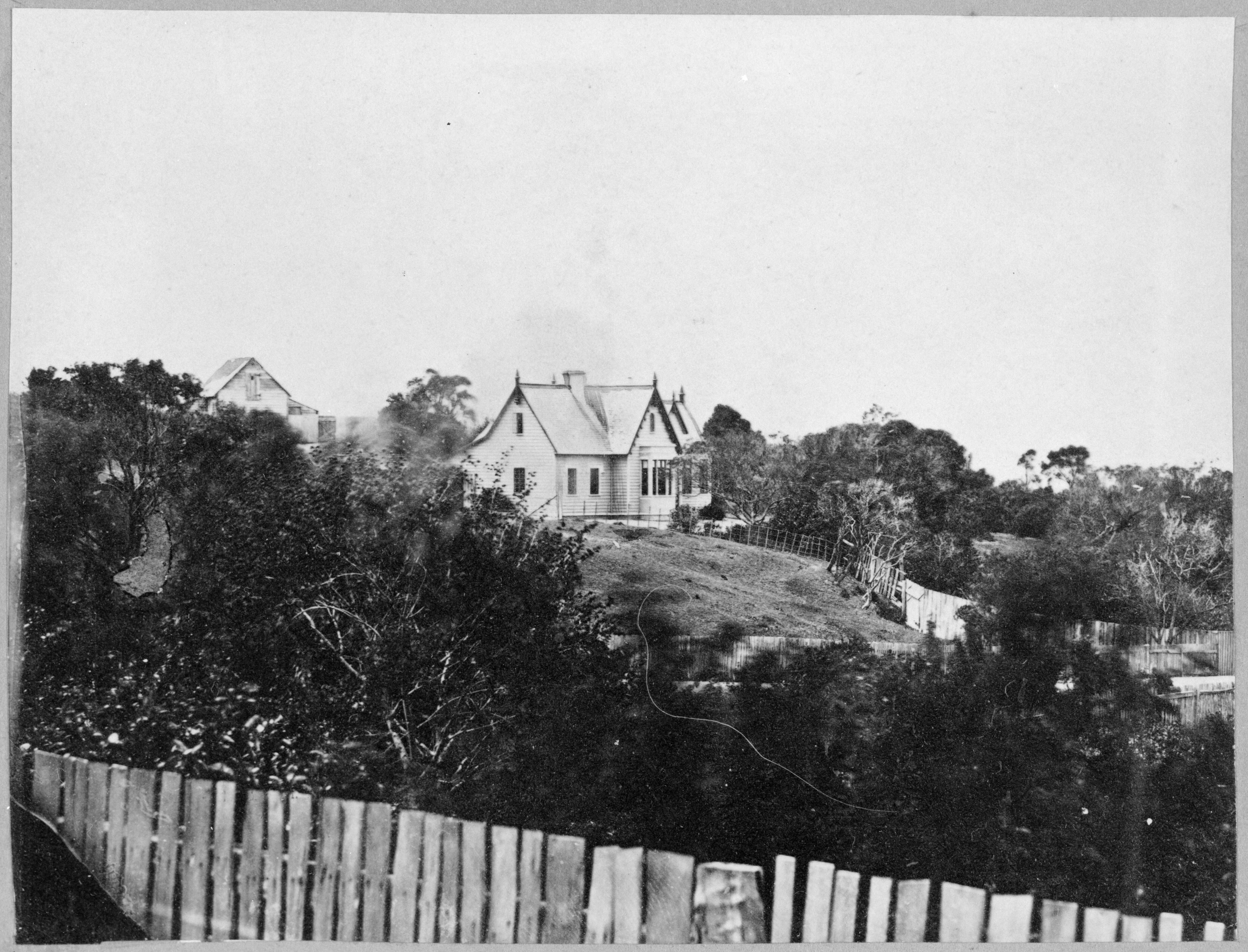
St. Hill's home in Thorndon

St. Hill was involved in local governance after he arrived in Wellington, joining a committee for establishing a New Zealand Company-backed provisional government for the nascent settlement. The following year he became magistrate for Wellington, a position he held for 20 years. In January 1843 he became sheriff for the southern districts. In this role he assisted Edward Gibbon Wakefield with investigating the Wairau Affray. That same year he was later appointed Commissioner of Native Reserves for Wellington, in this role he went to Taranaki with Bishop Selwyn and Taupo with Sir William Martin. In 1848 St. Hill was part of a board of inquiry investigating the damage of the 1848 Marlborough earthquake and making recommendations on potential changes to building laws in the province.

In 1858 St. Hill, as resident magistrate, oversaw a case involving an alleged sexual assault against a schoolgirl. The accused, Reverend Arthur Baker, was convicted by 15 Justices of the Peace but successfully appealed his conviction to the court. The case was controversial and well-commented upon by local newspapers.

== Political career ==
St. Hill was a member of the New Zealand Legislative Council from 1853 to 1856. In his position St. Hill attempted to pass one of the earliest attempts at reforming the council by moving a resolution that would see members be democratically appointed instead of being appointed by the Governor of New Zealand. The motion failed with only one other supporter. During his tenure he was presented with a kiwi feather cloak by a Mãori woman. The cloak is now held by the National Museum. One of St. Hill's descendants, National MP Nicola Grigg, wore the cloak when giving her maiden speech at parliament.

St. Hill was the Reform nominee for superintendent of Wellington Province in 1858. St. Hill was chosen to try and oust the incumbent Isaac Featherston, who was unwilling to cooperate with the Reformists on the provincial council. St. Hill was chosen due to being well respected amongst the province with even Featherston commenting on his respect for St. Hill. Despite this St. Hill lost the election to Featherston.

== Architectural career ==
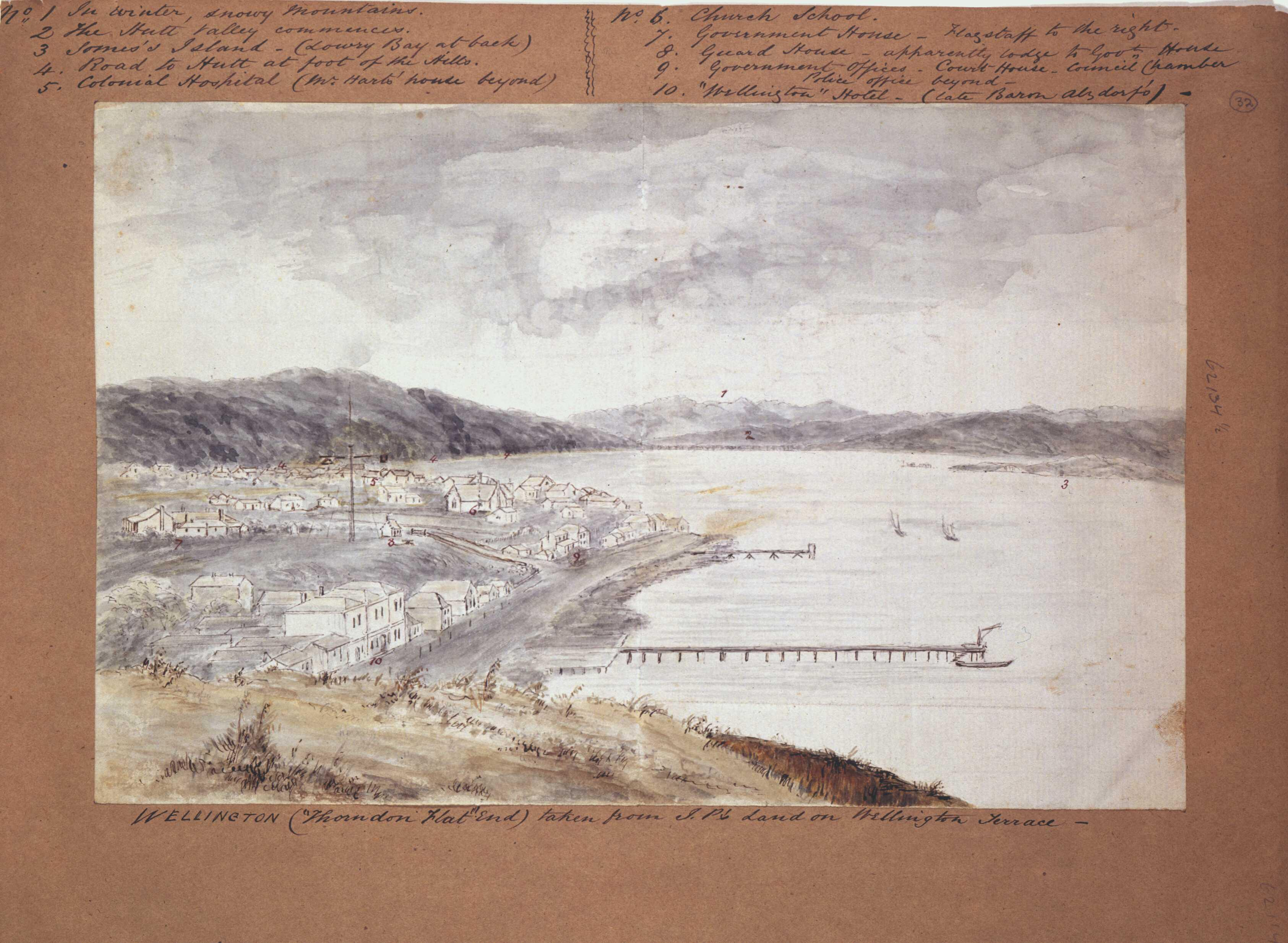
A c.1852 painting of Thorndon showing the Church of England school in the middle marked with the number 6

St. Hill had his occupation listed as an architect in 1843, although St. Hill did little work as an architect and focused on his non-architectural career. St. Hill was described as being the New Zealand Company architect in one report.

St. Hill submitted a design for St Paul's Church but it was rejected by Bishop Selwyn. St. Hill designed the Church of England school in Thordon, which had the appearance of a church.

== Retirement and personal life ==
In 1864 Henry St. Hill retired and returned to England due to poor health. St. Hill died 5 June 1866 in London. A brass plaque memorial to St. Hill exists at Old St Paul's Church.

St. Hill was friends with Edward Wakefield, Bishop Selwyn, and Te Puni. St. Hill was also friends with Octavius Hadfield, who stayed at St. Hill's home for 5 years during a bout of illness. St. Hill was a devout Anglican.

St Hill Street in Whanganui is named after St. Hill.
