= John Yeeden Lloyd =

New Zealand politician

John Yeeden Lloyd (born 1795) was a member of the New Zealand Legislative Council from 31 December 1853. His last attendance was on 28 July 1854, but he was still listed as a member on 6 August 1855. He was reappointed on 4 October 1855, and served until his resignation on 29 December 1857.

He was born in Taranaki.
