= New Zealand Legislative Council =

Former Upper House of New Zealand

Type
- Type: Upper house of the General Assembly of New Zealand^{[a]}

History
- Established: 1853^{[b]}
- Disbanded: 1 January 1951^{[c]}
- Preceded by: New Zealand Legislative Council (1841–1853)

Leadership
- Speaker: William Swainson (first); Thomas Otto Bishop (last)

Structure
- Length of term: Appointment for life (1853–1891); Appointment for 7 years (1891–1950)

Elections
- Voting system: Appointed by governor/governor-general

Meeting place
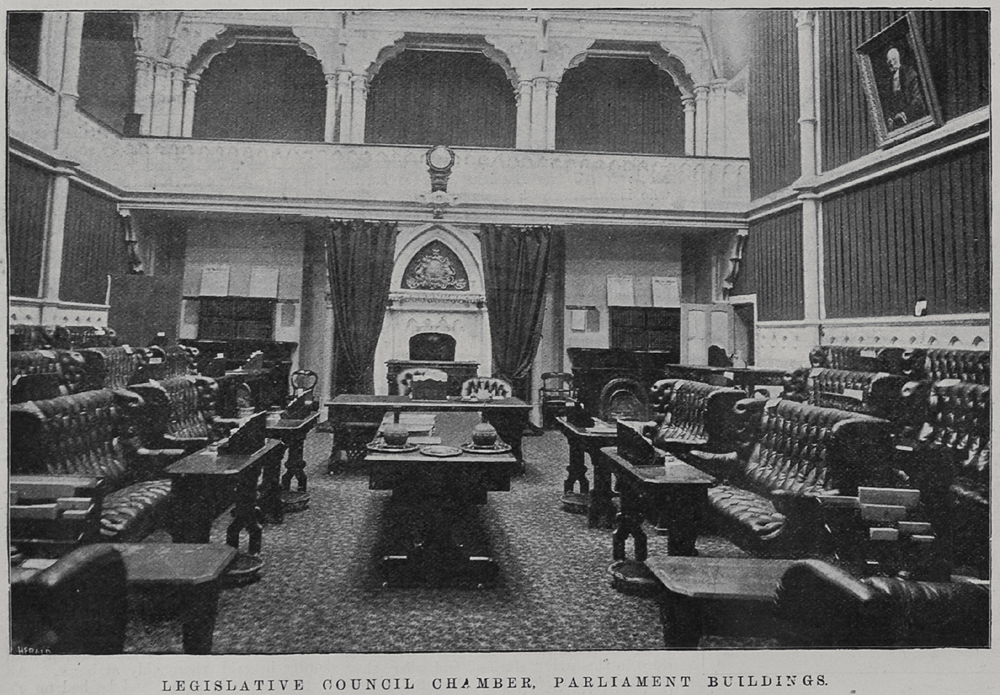
- The original plenary chamber, photographed in 1899
- Parliament House, Wellington

Footnotes
- a. Parliament was formally titled the "General Assembly of New Zealand" before 1986. b. First meeting of the General Assembly was on 24 May 1854. c. Final sitting on 1 December 1950.

The New Zealand Legislative Council was the upper house of the General Assembly of New Zealand from 1853 to 1950. An earlier legislative council existed from 1841 when New Zealand became a colony; it was reconstituted as the upper house of a bicameral legislature when New Zealand became self-governing in 1852, which came into effect in the following year.

Unlike the elected lower house, the House of Representatives, the Legislative Council was wholly appointed by the governor-general. The New Zealand Constitution Act 1852 had authorised the appointment of a minimum of ten councillors. Beginning in the 1890s, the membership of the upper house became controlled by the government of the day. As a result, the Legislative Council possessed little influence. While intended as a revising chamber, in practice, debates and votes typically simply replicated those in the lower house. It was abolished by an Act of Parliament in 1950, with its last sitting in December 1950.

The Council's chamber is no longer used as a debating chamber, but it is used for certain ceremonial functions, such as the speech from the throne.

== Forerunner ==
The first New Zealand Legislative Council was established by the Charter for Erecting the Colony of New Zealand on 16 November 1840, which created New Zealand as a Crown colony separate from New South Wales on 1 July 1841. Originally, the Legislative Council consisted of the governor, colonial secretary, and colonial treasurer, and a number of senior justices of the peace. The Legislative Council had the power to issue ordinances (statutory instruments). It became known as the general Legislative Council when provincial legislative councils were legislated for a few years later.

== Establishment ==
With the passing of the New Zealand Constitution Act 1852, the existing Legislative Council was disestablished and a similar appointed body was established, effective from 1853. The new Legislative Council was constituted as the upper house of the General Assembly (or "Parliament"), which did not actually meet until 24 May 1854, 16 months after the Constitution Act had come into force.

The Legislative Council was intended to act as a revising chamber, scrutinising and amending bills which had been passed by the House of Representatives. It could not initiate bills, and was prohibited from amending money bills (legislation relating to finance and expenditure). The model for the Legislative Council's role was the House of Lords in the United Kingdom.

== Membership ==
=== Appointment and tenure ===
The New Zealand Constitution Act 1852 provided for councillors to be appointed for life terms by the governor. As the power of the governor over New Zealand politics gradually decreased, it became the convention that appointments were made on the recommendation of the premier (later prime minister), meaning that councillors were essentially selected by the government of the day.

However, the life term of councillors meant that the Legislative Council always lagged behind the House of Representatives—premiers were frequently hampered in their activities by a Legislative Council appointed by their predecessors. In 1891, life membership was replaced by a seven-year term by the new Liberal Party government of John Ballance. While many Liberals apparently favoured outright abolition, it offered minimal political benefit for a ruling government, and such a radical move would have unnecessarily provoked fears about the new administration. Instead, term limits were introduced primarily for practical reasons, as Ballance's conservative predecessor, Harry Atkinson, had stacked the Council with seven conservatives shortly before leaving office. Ballance had considerable difficulty in achieving his reform of the Council, with major clashes occurring between him and the Governor, the Earl of Onslow, who had approved the seven appointments. Ballance's victory is seen as establishing an important precedent in the relationship between governor and prime minister.

The structure of the Legislative Council prior to 1891 was therefore similar to that of the Canadian Senate (which continues as an appointed upper house, although senators are no longer appointed to life terms, and must retire at the age of 75).

The style "The Honourable" could be retained from 1894 by a councillor with not less than ten years service if recommended by the governor. This privilege was extended to one member, William Montgomery, in 1906; and a further eleven members in 1951 after abolition of the Council.

=== Number of members ===
It was specified in the Constitution Act 1852 that the Council would consist of at least ten members. Although not actually a part of the Act, instructions were issued that the number of members should not exceed fifteen. One member was to be selected as speaker of the Legislative Council, corresponding roughly to the position of speaker of the House of Representatives. A quorum of five members was established.

The first appointments to the Legislative Council were made in 1853, when thirteen members were called to the upper house. They were John Salmon, William Swainson and Frederick Whitaker on 26 May 1853; Mathew Richmond on 23 June 1853; and on 31 December 1853 Edmund Bellairs, George Cutfield, William Kenny, John Yeeden Lloyd, Ralph Richardson, Henry Seymour, Henry St. Hill, Henry Petre and John Watts-Russell. Gradually, the maximum number of members was raised, and the limit was eventually abolished. The Council reached a peak of 53 members in 1885 and 1950.

=== Extent of representation ===
The Legislative Council was generally less representative of the New Zealand public than was the House of Representatives. Women were not eligible to serve as councillors before 1941, and only five were appointed. Two, Mary Anderson and Mary Dreaver, were appointed in 1946 by the First Labour Government. In 1950, when the First National Government appointed several new members to vote the council out of existence, three women were included; Cora Louisa Burrell, Ethel Gould and Agnes Weston. Māori were slightly better represented. The first two Māori councillors were appointed in 1872, not long after the creation of the Māori electorates in the House; Mōkena Kōhere and Wi Tako Ngātata. A convention was established that there should always be Māori representation on the Council.

=== 1891 appointments ===
In January 1891 the outgoing Atkinson Ministry appointed six new members to the Legislative Council, with the object of blocking any radical bills that John Ballance (who became Premier on 24 January) and his Liberal Government might introduce. They were the last appointments for life as the new government introduced a seven-year term. The new members were Charles Johnston and John Davies Ormond on 20 January; and Harry Atkinson (elected as speaker), James Fulton, William Downie Stewart, and John Blair Whyte on 22 January. John Hall had written to Ormond: "It will be a serious disaster if the Council is not strengthened before the Reds get into the saddle."

Petitions were tabled against the "stacking of the Council" by MPs and by Aucklanders. But the stacking has been seen as assisting the Liberal Government, which "might not have survived but for this assistance ... [which] provided a useful unifying influence in the critical early years" and "identified with dramatic clarity the reactionary class enemy ... and acted as a convenient brake on the radicals [who] were asked to settle for moderate measures."

=== Proposals for election ===
A number of proposals were made that the Legislative Council should be elected, not appointed. When responsible government had been granted at the beginning of the 2nd Parliament, the governor, Thomas Gore Browne, was given sufficient authority to make the Legislative Council elected, but no action was taken. In 1914, a reform proposal to establish a 42 or 43 member council elected by proportional representation for six years was introduced by the Liberals, but postponed due to World War I. In 1920 it was no longer favoured by the Reform government then in power. But the 1914 Act "remained like a sword of Damocles suspended above the nominated upper house, available at will or whim to any succeeding government".

== Abolition ==
External image
- Final gathering of the Legislative Council, 1 December 1950

By the middle of the 20th century, the Legislative Council was increasingly seen as ineffectual and obsolete. It made little difference to the legislative process, rarely criticising bills sent to it by the House. Some favoured its reform, while others favoured its abolition. Among the latter was Sidney Holland, leader of the National Party, which was in opposition to the Labour government.

Holland introduced a private member's bill in August 1947 to abolish the Council. The bill was defeated by government MPs, partly on the claim that New Zealand needed to first adopt the Statute of Westminster 1931, otherwise it could not repeal the part of the New Zealand Constitution Act 1852 (Note: It was an Act of the United Kingdom Parliament, and the New Zealand Parliament was barred from amending the parts of the Act dealing with the establishment of the Legislative Council.) that established the Council. Parliament passed the Statute of Westminster Adoption Act 1947 in November. Then, the New Zealand Parliament passed the New Zealand Constitution Amendment (Request and Consent) Act 1947, and the Parliament of the United Kingdom passed the New Zealand Constitution Amendment Act 1947, allowing the New Zealand Parliament to amend the Constitution Act and abolish the Legislative Council. However, the Labour government still did not support the abolition.

In 1950, the National Party, now in government, passed the Legislative Council Abolition Act. To assist its passage into law, Holland appointed twenty members (dubbed the "suicide squad") to vote for abolition, just as the Australian state of Queensland had done to abolish its upper house in 1922. They included former MPs Harold Dickie and Garnet Mackley. To encourage co-operation from other members, Holland also promised to use the money saved through abolition to set up a fund for retired members. A Statutes Revision Committee (abolished in 1986) was established to carry out some of the scrutiny that the Legislative Council had been intended for. Although abolition was intended as an interim measure, no serious attempts were made to introduce a new second chamber, and Parliament has been unicameral since.

== Proposed reestablishment ==
Support for bicameralism is not completely absent, and there have been occasional proposals for a new upper house or Senate. A constitutional reform committee chaired by Ronald Algie proposed an appointed Senate in 1952. The short-lived Liberal Party campaigned on re-establishing an upper house in the 1963 election. In 1990, the National government of Jim Bolger proposed an elected Senate, an idea advanced partly as an alternative to New Zealand's electoral reform process.

Unicameralists in New Zealand, like former Prime Minister Sir Geoffrey Palmer, argued that the country is a small and relatively homogeneous unitary state, and hence does not need the same arrangements as federal states like Australia or Canada. In addition, Peter Dunne, then also a Labour MP, argued that other political reforms in New Zealand such as the strengthening of the select committee system, and the introduction of proportional representation, provided adequate checks and balances, which would simply be duplicated by a second chamber.

== Legislative Council Chamber ==
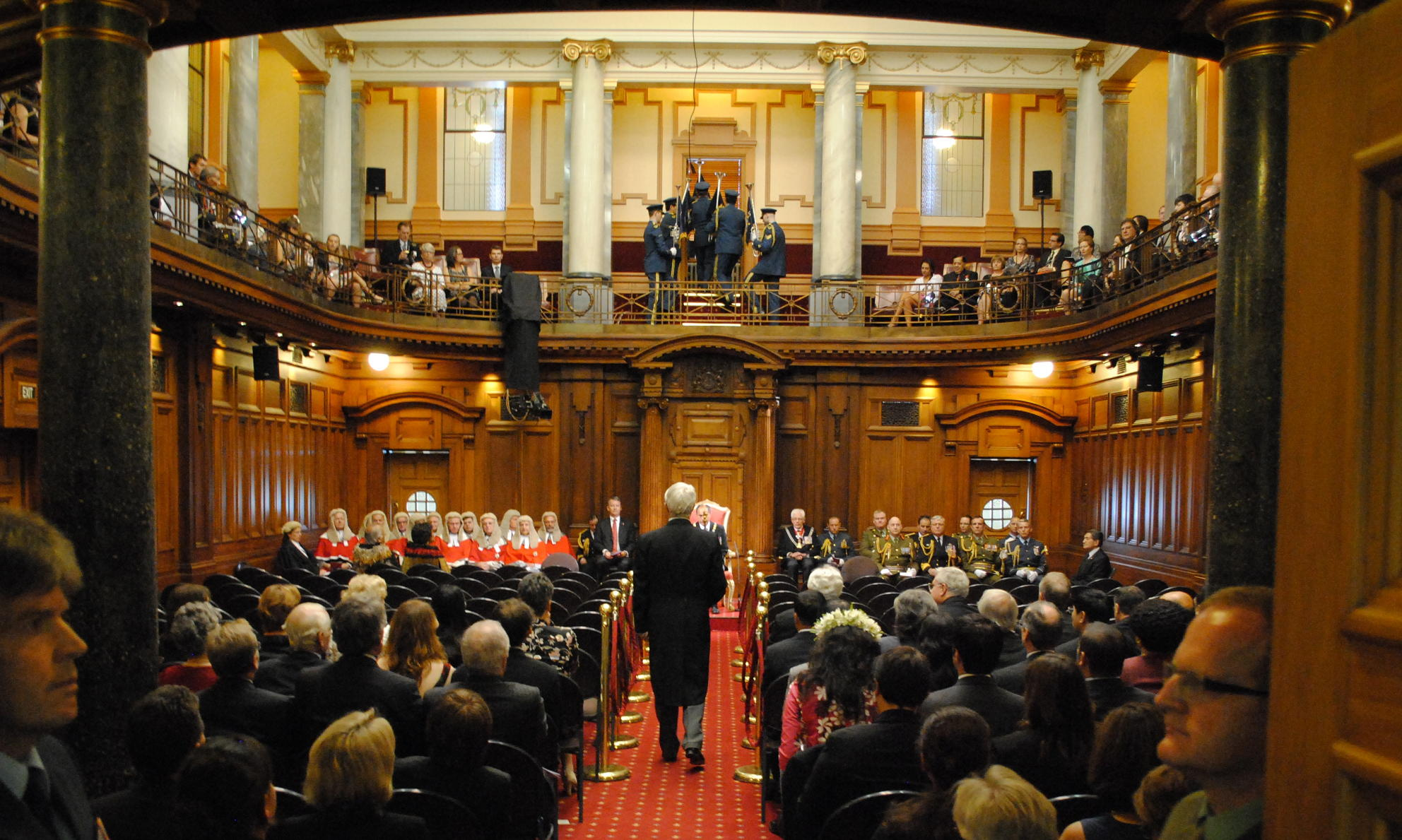
The Legislative Council Chamber in 2011, pictured before the speech from the throne

The Legislative Council Chamber remains the location of the speech from the throne—as following the British tradition, the sovereign (or a representative) does not enter the elected House. The usher of the Black Rod summons the members of the House of Representatives to attend the Opening of Parliament in the Legislative Council Chamber, where a speech is read usually by the governor-general. It is also used for some select committee meetings, as well as meetings of the Commonwealth Parliamentary Association and other official functions.

== See also ==
- List of members of the New Zealand Legislative Council
- Legislative council
- List of abolished upper houses
- Constitution of New Zealand

== Bibliography ==
- Hamer, David A. (1988). The New Zealand Liberals: The Years of Power, 1891–1912. Auckland: Auckland University Press. ISBN 1-86940-014-3. OCLC 18420103.
- Harris, Paul; Levine, Stephen; Clark, Margaret (1994). "Part I – The Constitution". The New Zealand Politics Source Book. Dunmore Press. ISBN 0-86469-338-9.
- Jackson, William Keith (1972). The New Zealand Legislative Council: a Study of the Establishment, Failure and Abolition of an Upper House. Toronto: University of Toronto Press. ISBN 0-8020-1860-2. Archived from the original on 3 April 2021.
- McIvor, Timothy (1989). The Rainmaker: A biography of John Ballance. Auckland: Heinemann Reed. ISBN 0-7900-0024-5.
- McLintock, A. H.; Wood, G. A. (1987). The Upper House in Colonial New Zealand: a Study of the Legislative Council of New Zealand in the Period 1854–1887. Wellington: Government Printer. ASIN B004WVKP3K.
- Moon, Paul (2010). New Zealand Birth Certificates – 50 of New Zealand's Founding Documents. AUT Media. ISBN 9780958299718.
- Reeves, William Pember (1901). "Ballance, John" . In Lee, Sidney (ed.). Dictionary of National Biography (1st supplement). London: Smith, Elder & Co.
- Scholefield, Guy (1950) [First ed. published 1913]. New Zealand Parliamentary Record, 1840–1949 (3rd ed.). Wellington: Govt. Printer.
- Wilson, Jim (1985) [First ed. published 1913]. New Zealand Parliamentary Record, 1840–1984 (4th ed.). Wellington: V.R. Ward, Govt. Printer. p. 150. OCLC 154283103.
