= Carol Shand =

New Zealand doctor (born 1939)

Carol Shand CNZM
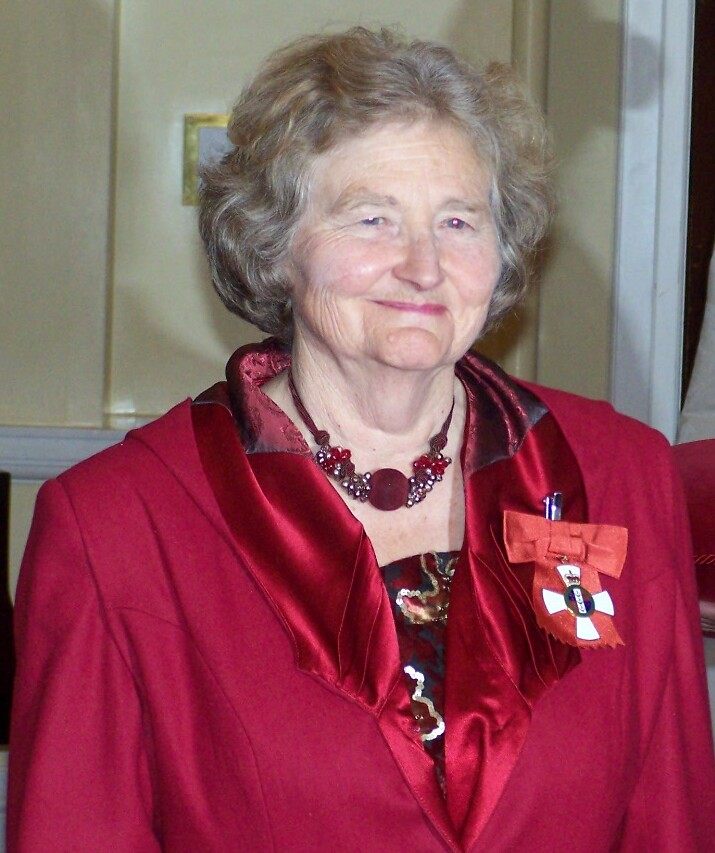
- Shand in 2008
- Born: Meon Carolyn Shand; 1939 (age 86–87)
- Education: University of Otago
- Occupation: Physician
- Spouse: Erich Geiringer (m. 1964; died 1995)
- Relatives: Tom Shand (father); Claudia Geiringer (daughter); Claude Weston (grandfather); Agnes Weston (grandmother); Thomas S. Weston (great-grandfather); George Weston (great-uncle); Thomas Shailer Weston Jr. (great uncle)

Meon Carolyn Shand CNZM (born 1939) is a New Zealand doctor, general practitioner and advocate for women's health, maternity care, contraception, abortion and the medical care of the victims of sexual abuse and child abuse.

== Early life and education ==
Shand was the daughter of farmer and politician Tom Shand and doctor Claudia Lilian Shand, née Weston. She had a brother Anthony and two sisters, Jill and Ann. She graduated with her medical degree from the University of Otago in 1962.

== Career ==
Shand was a house surgeon (a surgical "RMO" or "house officer") at Wellington Hospital early in her career but became a general practitioner, running a general practice in Wellington with her husband Erich Geiringer.

Shand has worked over the years to make abortions safe and available, with her colleague Margaret Sparrow. She was active in the Wellington branch of Sisters Overseas Service (SOS) in the late 1970s helping women to go to Australia for abortions. She pioneered work in the medical treatment of victims of sexual assault and child sex abuse.

Shand retired from her practice in 2017.

== Honours and awards ==
Shand was appointed a Companion of the New Zealand Order of Merit, for services to women's health, in the 2008 Queen's Birthday Honours.

== Personal life ==
Shand married doctor Erich Geiringer in 1964. They had three children, Claudia, and two boys.

== Selected works ==
=== Books ===
- From recognition to recovery : a general practice guide to the medical management of sexual abuse, edited by Carol Shand and Robynanne Milford (1993) ISBN 0958325103
- The medical management of sexual abuse, edited by Carol Shand et al. (2002) ISBN 0473086808
- Things I Remember, or Was Told: a memoir (2022) ISBN 978-0-9941494-9-7

=== Journal articles ===
- Jacqueline K Mein; Cheryn M Palmer; Meon Carol Shand; et al. (1 March 2003). "Management of acute adult sexual assault". Medical Journal of Australia. 178 (5): 226–230. doi:10.5694/j.1326-5377.2003.tb05168.x. ISSN 0025-729X. PMID 12603187. Wikidata Q35072087.
- Carol Shand; Sally B Rose; Ann Simmons; Margaret J Sparrow (1 August 2005). "Introduction of early medical abortion in New Zealand: an audit of the first 67 cases". Australian and New Zealand Journal of Obstetrics and Gynaecology. 45 (4): 316–320. doi:10.1111/j.1479-828x.2005.00419.x. ISSN 0004-8666. PMID 16029300. Wikidata Q46608546.
- Margaret Sparrow; Carol Shand; Jane Macdonald (30 June 2006). "Atypical presentation of serious pelvic inflammatory disease following mifepristone-induced medical abortion". Contraception. 74 (4): 352-3; author reply 353-4. doi:10.1016/j.contraception.2006.04.008. ISSN 0010-7824. PMID 16982242. Wikidata Q80281995.
- Sally B Rose; Carol Shand; Ann Simmons (1 December 2006). "Mifepristone- and misoprostol-induced mid-trimester termination of pregnancy: a review of 272 cases". Australian and New Zealand Journal of Obstetrics and Gynaecology. 46 (6): 479–485. doi:10.1111/j.1479-828x.2006.00646.x. ISSN 0004-8666. PMID 17116051. Wikidata Q36658209.
- Jack Havill; Miles Williams; Jay Kuten; et al. (27 July 2018). "Enough doctors support the End of Life Choice Bill to make it operable". The New Zealand Medical Journal. 131 (1479): 88–90. ISSN 0028-8446. PMID 30048438. Wikidata Q90498132.
