= 36th New Zealand Parliament =

Term of the Parliament of New Zealand

36th Parliament of New Zealand
←	35th Parliament	37th Parliament	→
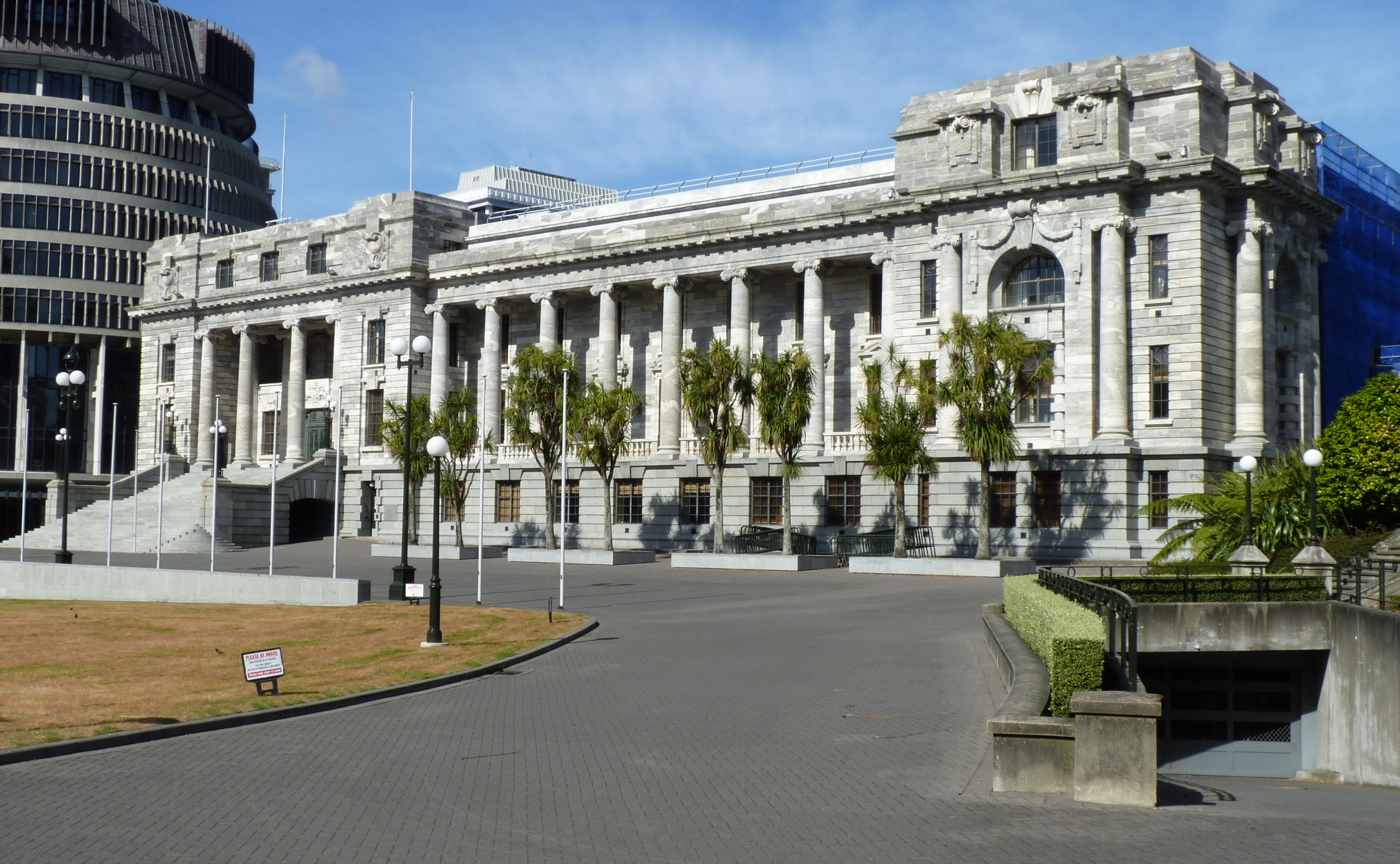
- Parliament House, Wellington

Overview
- Legislative body: New Zealand Parliament
- Term: 12 March 1970 – 20 October 1972
- Election: 1969 New Zealand general election
- Government: Second National Government

House of Representatives
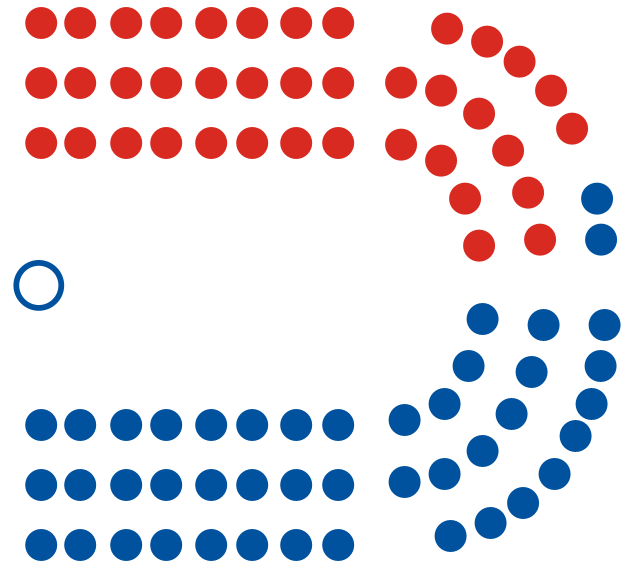
- Members: 84
- Speaker of the House: Alfred E. Allen from 7 June 1972 — Roy Jack until 9 February 1972
- Prime Minister: Jack Marshall — Keith Holyoake until 7 February 1972
- Leader of the Opposition: Norman Kirk

Sovereign
- Monarch: Elizabeth II
- Governor-General: Denis Blundell from 27 September 1972 — Arthur Porritt until 7 September 1972

The 36th New Zealand Parliament was a term of the New Zealand Parliament. It was elected at the 1969 general election on 29 November of that year.

== 1969 general election ==
The 1969 general election was held on Saturday, 29 November. A total of 84 MPs were elected; 55 represented North Island electorates, 25 represented South Island electorates, and the remaining four represented Māori electorates; this was an increase in the number of MPs by four since the 1966 election. 1,519,889 voters were enrolled and the official turnout at the election was 88.9%.

== Sessions ==
The 36th Parliament sat for three sessions, and was prorogued on 20 October 1972.

Session	Opened	Adjourned
first	12 March 1970	3 December 1970
second	25 February 1971	17 December 1971
third	7 June 1972	20 October 1972

== Ministries ==
The National Party had come to power at the 1960 election, and Keith Holyoake had formed the second Holyoake Ministry on 12 December 1960, which stayed in power until Holyoake stepped down in early 1972. He was succeeded by Jack Marshall, who formed the Marshall Ministry on 7 February of that year. The second National Government was defeated at the 25 November 1972 election.

== Overview of seats ==
The table below shows the number of MPs in each party following the 1969 election and at dissolution:

Affiliation	Members	
Affiliation	At 1969 election	At dissolution
National Government	45	44
Labour Opposition	39	40
Total	84	84
Working Government majority	6	4

Notes

- The Working Government majority is calculated as all Government MPs less all other parties.

== Initial composition of the 36th Parliament ==
The table below shows the results of the 1969 general election:

Key

National Labour Social Credit Independent

Electorate results for the 1969 New Zealand general election
Electorate	Incumbent	Winner	Majority	Runner up
General electorates
Ashburton	Colin McLachlan		2,590	John Srhoy
Auckland Central	Norman Douglas		1,124	Clive Edwards
Avon	John Mathison		5,600	Alistair Ansell
Awarua	Gordon Grieve	Hugh Templeton	906	Aubrey Begg
Bay of Plenty	Percy Allen		3,440	Barry Kelly
Birkenhead	New electorate	Norman King	1,701	Don McKinnon
Buller	Bill Rowling		2,822	Ernie King
Christchurch Central	Robert Macfarlane	Bruce Barclay	3,406	Colin Knight
Clutha	Peter Gordon		3,618	Les McKay
Dunedin Central	Brian MacDonell		3,949	Margaret Mary Reichwein
Dunedin North	Ethel McMillan		2,929	Iona Williams
Eden	John Rae		67	Keith Sinclair (Note: Sinclair was first on election night for Eden (by 35 votes), but lost when special votes were included)
Egmont	Venn Young		4,280	Tom McGreevy
Franklin	Alfred E. Allen		5,495	Tai Tuhimata
Gisborne	Esme Tombleson		781	Trevor Davey
Grey Lynn	Ritchie Macdonald	Eddie Isbey	2,915	Jens Meder
Hamilton West	New electorate	Leslie Munro	1,878	Bob Reese
Hastings	Duncan MacIntyre		706	Richard Mayson
Hauraki	Arthur Kinsella	Leo Schultz	2,121	Dorothy Jelicich
Hawkes Bay	Richard Harrison		3,416	David Butcher
Henderson	New electorate	Martyn Finlay	3,295	Adrian Clarke
Heretaunga	Ron Bailey		1,375	Ralph Miller
Hobson	Vernon Cracknell	Logan Sloane	1,252	Vernon Cracknell
Hutt	Trevor Young		1,775	Don Lee
Invercargill	Ralph Hanan	John Chewings	1,031	Trevor Young
Island Bay	Arnold Nordmeyer	Gerald O'Brien	1,348	Fairlie Curry
Karori	Jack Marshall		6,226	Roy Tombs
Lyttelton	Norman Kirk	Tom McGuigan	292	Peter de Latour
Manawatu	Les Gandar		1,323	Ernie Hemmingsen
Mangere	New electorate	Colin Moyle	4,588	Neville Charles Slater
Manukau	Colin Moyle	Roger Douglas	875	Ronald Alfred Walden
Manurewa	Phil Amos		1,371	Pat Baker
Marlborough	Tom Shand		2,460	Ian Brooks
Marsden	Don McKay		1,101	Murray Smith
Miramar	Bill Young		1,789	Charles Troughton
Mt Albert	Warren Freer		2,837	Gavin Downie
Napier	Gordon Christie		1,970	Terry Dunleavy
Nelson	Stan Whitehead		1,248	Roy McLennan
New Lynn	Jonathan Hunt		3,600	Vic Watson
New Plymouth	Ron Barclay		1,000	Brian Clark
North Shore	George Gair		3,964	Donald Frederick Dugdale
Oamaru	New electorate	Allan Dick	497	N Agnew
Onehunga	Hugh Watt		4,539	Daphne Double
Otago Central	Jack George	Murray Rose	1,086	Brian Griffiths
Otaki	Allan McCready		2,037	John Scott
Pahiatua	Keith Holyoake		4,920	Trevor de Cleene
Pakuranga	Bob Tizard		1,253	Noel Holmes
Palmerston North	Joe Walding		161	Gordon Cruden
Papanui	New electorate	Bert Walker	2,096	Martin Hobby
Petone	Fraser Colman		3,450	Francis Joshua Handy
Piako	Jack Luxton		4,426	George Bryant
Porirua	Henry May	Gerry Wall	2,744	Paul William Mitchell
Raglan	Douglas Carter		593	Dudley Sinclair
Rangiora	Lorrie Pickering		1,143	Paul Piesse
Rangitikei	Norman Shelton		4,214	Dan Duggan
Remuera	Allan Highet		7,097	Hamish Keith
Riccarton	Mick Connelly	Eric Holland	2,939	Alan C. McEwen
Rodney	Jack Scott	Peter Wilkinson	2,832	Nevern McConachy
Roskill	Arthur Faulkner		3,296	Anthony Cook
Rotorua	Harry Lapwood		1,198	Charles Bennett
St Albans	Bert Walker	Roger Drayton	909	Ian Wilson
St Kilda	Bill Fraser		3,795	Lloyd George Anderson
South Canterbury	New electorate	Rob Talbot	1,215	Maurice Austin Cameron
Stratford	David Thomson		4,158	Lindsay Hugh Stockbridge
Sydenham	Mabel Howard	Norman Kirk	6,026	Peter Morrissey
Tamaki	Robert Muldoon		6,088	Alfred David Bolton
Taupo	Rona Stevenson		107	Jack Ingram
Tauranga	George Walsh		2,704	Ray Dillon
Timaru	Sir Basil Arthur		3,101	Dave Walker
Waikato	New electorate	Lance Adams-Schneider	3,408	Alfred Ernest George
Waimarino	Roy Jack		2,213	Shaun Alex Cameron
Wairarapa	Haddon Donald	Jack Williams	467	Haddon Donald
Waitemata	Norman King	Frank Gill	1,052	Michael Bassett
Waitomo	David Seath		5,674	Neil Roger David Shewan
Wallace	Brian Talboys		4,532	J Robson
Wanganui	George Spooner	Bill Tolhurst	959	George Spooner
Wellington Central	Dan Riddiford		2,200	Olive Smuts-Kennedy
Western Hutt	New electorate	Henry May	1,421	Egan E Ogier
Westland	Paddy Blanchfield		1,879	Barry Dallas
Wigram	New electorate	Mick Connelly	3,200	Dick Dawson
Māori electorates
Eastern Maori	Paraone Reweti		3,487	Henare Ngata
Northern Maori	Matiu Rata		4,758	Graham Latimer
Southern Maori	Whetu Tirikatene-Sullivan		6,630	Norra Woodbane Pomare
Western Maori	Iriaka Rātana	Koro Wētere	7,530	P J Hura

Table footnotes:

== By-elections during 36th Parliament ==
There was one by-election held during the term of the 36th Parliament.

Electorate and by-election		Date	Incumbent	Cause	Winner
Marlborough	1970	21 February	Tom Shand	Death	Ian Brooks
