= Geiringer =

Geiringer is a surname. Notable people with the surname include:

- Claudia Geiringer (born 1968), New Zealand professor of law
- Elfriede Geiringer (1905–1998), Austrian Jewish survivor of the Second World War
- Erich Geiringer (1917–1995), New Zealand writer, publisher, broadcaster, and a leading member of International Physicians for the Prevention of Nuclear War
- Eva Geiringer Schloss (born 1929), Austrian Jewish survivor of the Second World War
- Hilda Geiringer (1893–1973), Austrian mathematician
- Karl Geiringer (1899–1989), Austrian American musicologist, educator and biographer of composers
- Martha Geiringer (1912–1943), Austrian biologist and Nazi victim
