= George Weston (lawyer) =

New Zealand cricketer

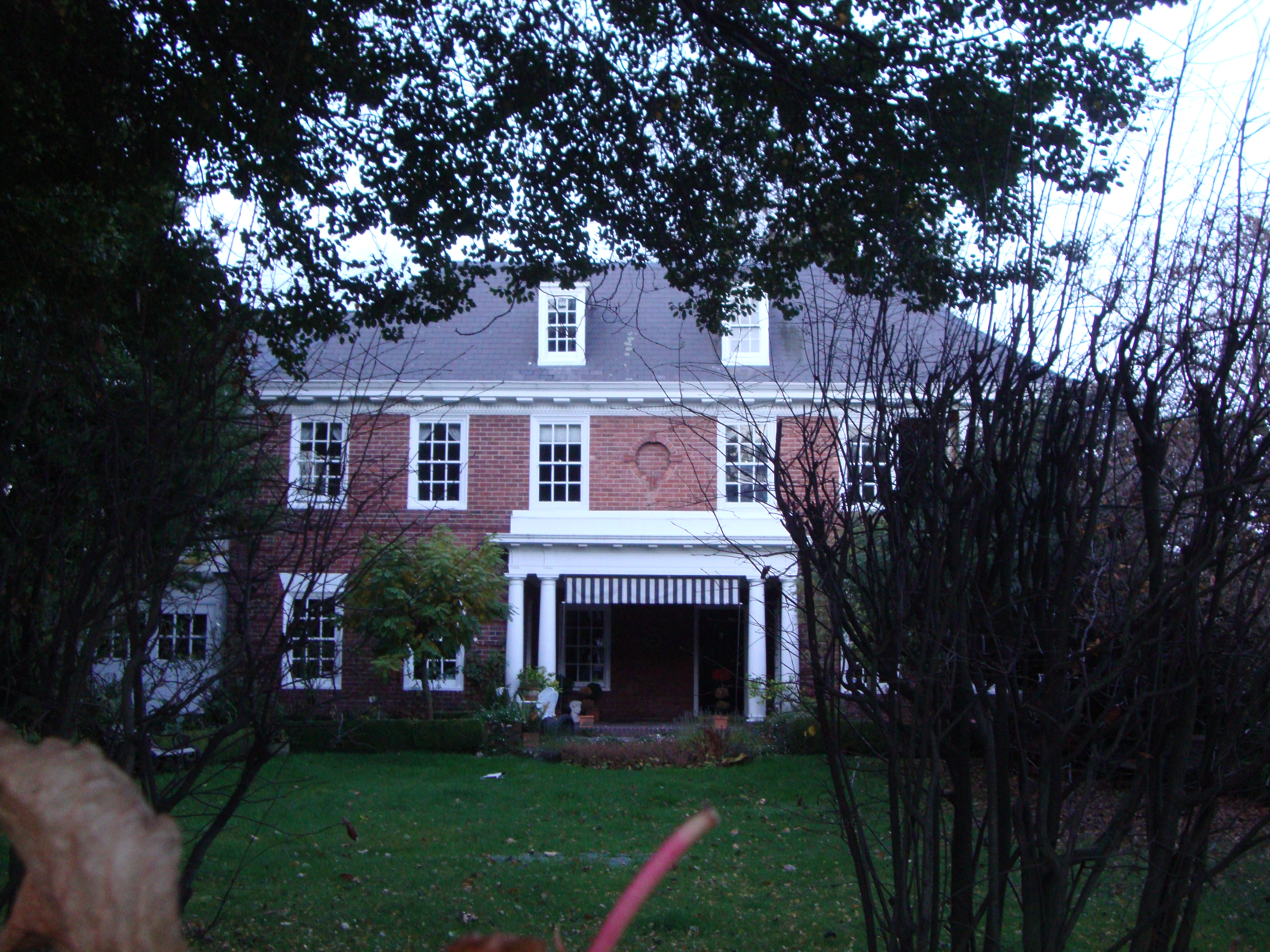

Personal information
- Full name: George Thorngate Weston
- Born: 21 October 1876; Hokitika, New Zealand
- Died: 19 September 1957 (aged 80); Christchurch, New Zealand
- Batting: Right-handed
- Role: Wicket-keeper
- Relatives: Thomas S. Weston (father); Thomas Shailer Weston Jr. (brother); Claude Weston (brother); Agnes Weston (sister-in-law); Tom Weston (great-nephew); William C. Weston (cousin)

Domestic team information
- Years: Team
- 1903/04–1904/05: Canterbury
- First-class debut: 25 December 1903 Canterbury v Otago
- Last First-class: 31 December 1904 Canterbury v Otago

Career statistics
Competition	First-class
Matches	4
Runs scored	74
Batting average	9.25
100s/50s	0/0
Top score	42
Catches/stumpings	6/0
- Source: CricketArchive, 25 January 2022

George Thorngate Weston (21 October 1876 – 19 September 1957) was a New Zealand lawyer and cricketer.

Weston was born on 21 October 1876 in Hokitika. The publisher Walter Weston was his twin brother. The judge Thomas S. Weston was their father. Thomas Shailer Weston Jr. and Claude Weston were brothers, and Agnes Weston was his sister-in-law. Weston received his education in Christchurch at Christ's College and Canterbury College. He graduated from the university with a bachelor of art in 1897 and a bachelor of laws in 1898. In the same year, he was admitted to the bar by Justice Edward Conolly.

Weston played in four first-class matches for Canterbury from 1903 to 1905.

Weston was a lecturer in law at his alma mater from 1902 to 1906. He served on the board of governors of Canterbury College from 1907 to 1916. In 1919, he was elected fellow of Christ's College. In 1917 and 1918, he was lieutenant in World War I. He was a prominent lawyer in Christchurch, where he founded the firm Weston Ward & Lascelles (which, as of 2022, is still operating). Later in his career, he had the rank of major in the New Zealand Army and worked in their legal department. For a time, he served as president of the Canterbury District Law Society.

A Freemason, Weston served as grand registrar of the Grand Lodge of New Zealand Freemasons from 1930 to 1932.

Weston engaged architect Cecil Wood to design a stately house. It took two years to build, located on Park Terrace and looking out over North Hagley Park. Completed in 1924, the building became known as Weston House and was later registered as a Category I heritage building by Heritage New Zealand. It was demolished after irreparable damage from the 2011 Christchurch earthquake.

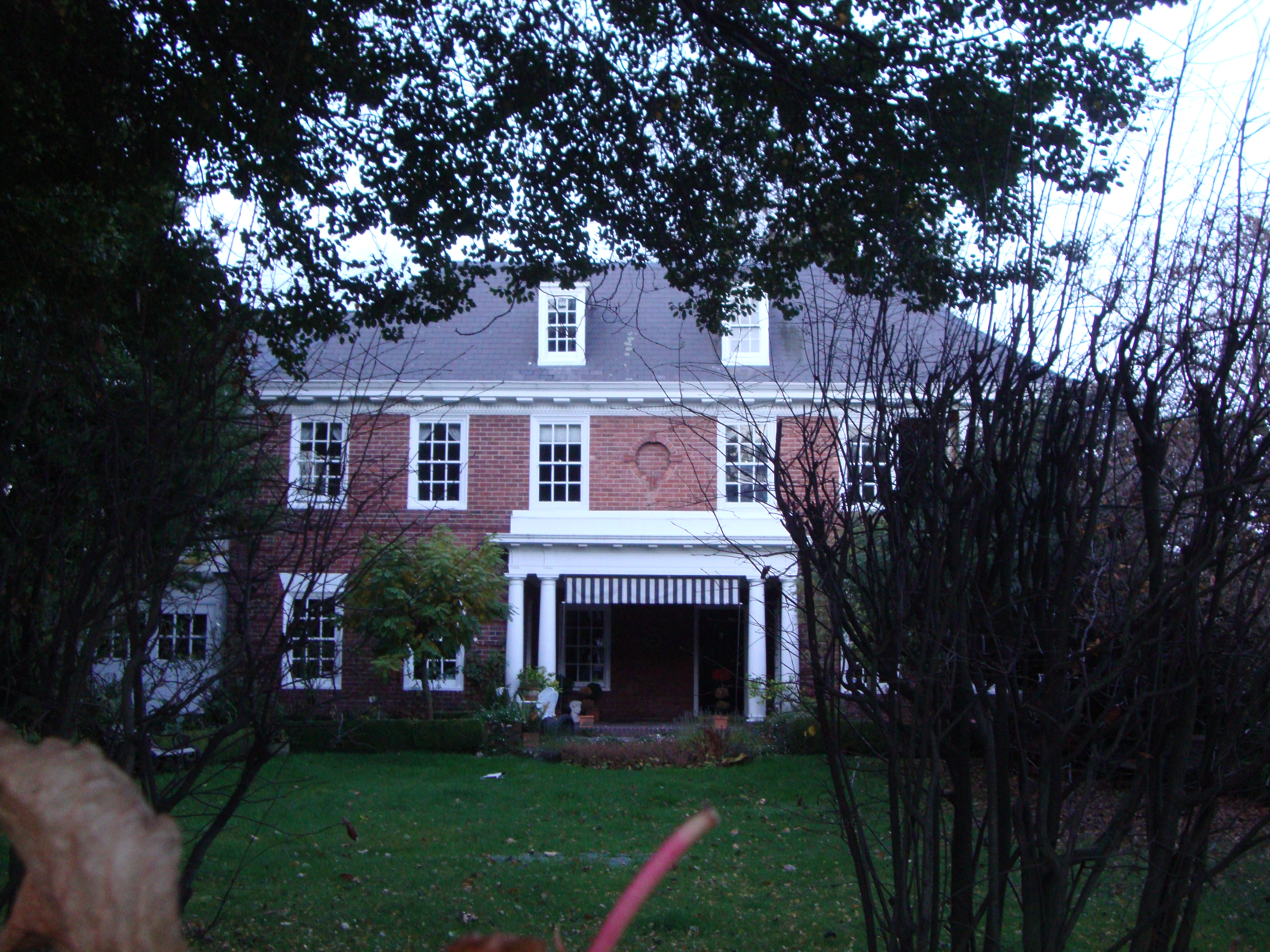
Weston House in May 2011 after the earthquake

On 14 November 1923 at St Luke's Church, he married Maude Cargill. In 1953, he was awarded the Queen Elizabeth II Coronation Medal. Weston died on 19 September 1957 aged 80 at his home in Park Terrace, and was survived by his wife, two sons, and one daughter. His wife died in 1976.

== See also ==
- List of Canterbury representative cricketers
