= Hegglun =

Hegglun is a surname. Notable people with the surname include:

- Greg Hegglun (born 1984), New Zealand cricketer
- Tristan Hegglun (1915–1983), New Zealand rower, rugby union player, and politician
