= Ned Holt =

New Zealand politician

Ned Holt OBE JP
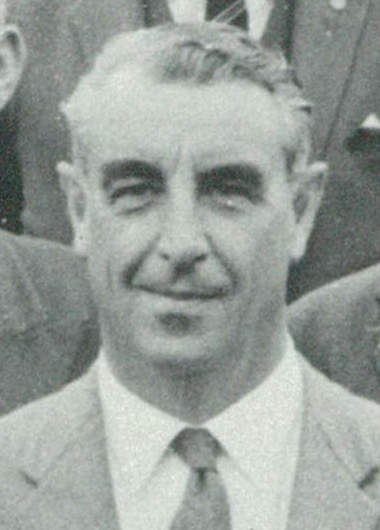
- Holt in 1962

President of the National Party
- In office 1966–1973
- Preceded by: Jack Meadowcroft
- Succeeded by: George Chapman

Personal details
- Born: Edward Durning Holt; 3 February 1913 Ormondville, New Zealand
- Died: 25 November 1977 (aged 64) Napier, New Zealand
- Party: National
- Spouse: Margaret Simpson

Edward Durning Holt OBE JP (3 February 1913 – 25 November 1977) was a New Zealand farmer, who served as the president of the National Party from 1966 to 1973.

== Biography ==
Born at Ormondville on 3 February 1913, Holt was the son of Catherine Christabel de Vere Allen and Edward During Holt. He was educated at Huntley School, Wanganui Collegiate School, and Napier Boys' High School, and went on to study at Massey Agricultural College, where he completed a Diploma of Agriculture. He married Margaret Katherine Simpson at St Stephen's Church, Marton, on 19 February 1936.

During World War II, Holt served with the Royal New Zealand Air Force as a flying instructor. He served as a member of the Hawke's Bay County Council between 1951 and 1964. and was chair of the Massey College council from 1960 to 1962. He was appointed a justice of the peace in 1956.

Holt served as Hawke's Bay regional chair of the National Party from 1954 to 1963, and was deputy chair of the party's Wellington division from 1958 to 1962. He was elected president of the National Party in 1966. He was a supporter of Keith Holyoake's policies, but in the 1970 Marlborough by-election, in which Andy Shand, after his father's death on 11 December 1969, stood against, and was defeated by, Labour candidate Ian Brooks, Holt was questioned by George Chapman. Chapman subsequently found that Holt had been complacent about the by-election, with Holt having said that everything was in order, and that in any case the Marlborough seat was a National stronghold and was unlikely to change hands. These events would see Chapman elected as party president in 1973.

In the 1977 New Year Honours, Holt was appointed an Officer of the Order of the British Empire, for services to agriculture and the community. Holt died in Napier on 25 November 1977, aged 64 years.

Party political offices
Preceded by Jack Meadowcroft	President of the National Party; 1966–1973	Succeeded by George Chapman
