= Tristan Hegglun =

New Zealand sportsman, soldier and local politician (1915–1983)

Tristan Hegglun OBE ED
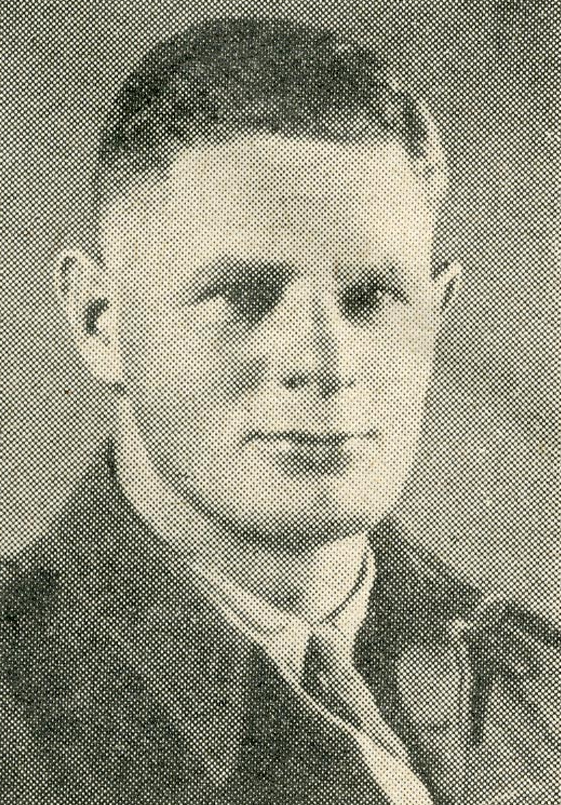

Personal information
- Full name: Tristan Freitas Hegglun
- Born: 29 July 1915 Marton, New Zealand
- Died: 22 July 1983 (aged 67) Blenheim, New Zealand
- Education: Marlborough College
- Spouse: Patricia Mary Meachen (m. 1945)
- Relatives: Ted Meachen (father-in-law); Greg Hegglun (grandson)

Sport
- Country: New Zealand
- Sport: Rowing
- Club: Wairau Rowing Club; Wellington Rowing Club

Rugby union career
- Position: Forward
Provincial / State sides
Years	Team	Apps	(Points)
1937	Marlborough		
1938–1940	Wellington	23	
1945–1949	Marlborough	25	

Achievements and titles
- National finals: Single scull champion (1949); Coxed four champion (1954)

Tristan Freitas Hegglun OBE ED (29 July 1915 – 22 July 1983) was a New Zealand rower, rugby union player, and local-body politician. He rowed for his country at the 1950 British Empire Games, and won two national rowing titles. A prop, lock and flanker, he played provincial rugby for both Wellington and Marlborough, and was involved in services matches during World War II. He later served as a Blenheim borough councillor.

== Early life and family ==
Born in Marton on 29 July 1915, Hegglun was the son of Edward Tristan Hegglun and Gertrude Lilian Hegglun (née Gomez). He was educated at Marlborough College in Blenheim. In 1945, he married Patricia Mary Meachen, daughter of the member of Parliament for Marlborough and later mayor of Blenheim, Ted Meachen. The couple went on to have seven children, including Marilen Hegglun who won several national rowing titles, and was one of the first women to represent New Zealand in rowing internationally. Another of their children, Richard Hegglun, played for the Marlborough rugby side during their 1973–1974 Ranfurly Shield tenure, and Richard's son, Greg Hegglun, played first-class cricket for Central Districts.

== Sporting career ==
=== Rowing ===
Hegglun was a member of the Wellington Rowing Club before World War II, but he is more closely associated with the Wairau Rowing Club in Marlborough. He won two New Zealand Rowing Championships titles representing Wairau: the single scull in 1949 at Lake Karapiro, and as a member of the men's coxed four crew in 1954 in Picton.

At the 1950 British Empire Games in Auckland, Hegglun, as reigning national champion, represented New Zealand in the single scull, finishing in fourth place.

In later years, Hegglun was one of the driving forces behind the development of Lake Ruataniwha as a rowing venue. As a national champion, Hegglun was accorded life membership of the Wairau Rowing Club, but in 2010, as part of the club's centennial celebrations, he was also posthumously awarded life membership in recognition of his service to the club.

=== Rugby union ===
In 1937, Hegglun made his representative debut for Marlborough, playing as a loose forward, before moving to Wellington.

Playing for the Poneke club, Hegglun was first selected as a middle-row forward (in a 3–4–1 scrum formation) in the Wellington provincial rugby team that played Taranaki in 1938. Later that season, he played in the front row against Otago. In Wellington's match against Hawke's Bay in 1940, Hegglun scored a try under the posts in his side's 8–3 victory at Athletic Park. Between 1938 and 1940, Hegglun made 23 appearances for Wellington.

From 1945, Hegglun played for the Opawa club in Blenheim, and in July 1945 he was a member of the Marlborough side that defeated Buller to lift the Seddon Shield. When Marlborough successfully defended the shield against Golden Bay-Motueka the following month, by 24 points to 3, Hegglun's forward play was described as "outstanding".

In 1946, Hegglun was named at prop in the South Island team to play the North Island; the rain-shortened match, played at Athletic Park, Wellington, was won by the North 8–3. Later that year, he played at lock for a combined Seddon Shields Districts side against the touring Australian national team, scoring a try as the Australians won a close match 15–12. Hegglun continued to play a prominent role in the Marlborough side until 1949, when he retired.

Hegglun was an All Blacks triallist before and after World War II, in 1939 as a flanker and 1947 as a prop.

== Military service ==
Before World War II, Hegglun worked as a builder and bridge constructor. He enlisted as a private in the Infantry Reinforcements, 2nd New Zealand Expeditionary Force (2NZEF), Third Echelon. In February 1943, he was commissioned as a second lieutenant in the New Zealand Infantry, and that year, on 3 December, he was wounded in action.

While serving in the Middle East, Hegglun took part in services rugby matches, representing 2NZEF, including against a British Combined Services team and an Australian Imperial Force side in December 1941, He also played a prominent part in the inaugural rowing regatta in 1942 between New Zealand forces and the Cairo River Club for the Freyberg Cup, held on the Nile. The trophy was won by the New Zealanders, with Hegglun winning the single scull, being a member of the crew that won the coxless four, and stroking the New Zealand Division pair that finished third. In 1943, Hegglun won the single scull in the Cairo championships, defeating the Egyptian champion in the process. Hegglun also showed some talent as a boxer, contesting the heavyweight class in the New Zealand divisional boxing championships in Syria in 1942, where he was knocked out in the semi-final.

Following the war, Hegglun remained active in the military, serving in the Royal New Zealand Infantry Regiment Territorial Force, rising to the rank of colonel. He was commanding officer of the 1st Battalion, Nelson–Marlborough–West Coast Regiment, between 1959 and 1961, and deputy commander of the Southern Military District from 1961 to 1967. In 1953, he was awarded the Queen Elizabeth II Coronation Medal, and in the 1967 Queen’s Birthday Honours, he was appointed an Officer of the Military Division of the Order of the British Empire.

== Later life and death ==
Hegglun worked as an overseer for the Blenheim Borough Council. Active in community affairs, he served as a Blenheim borough councillor, and as the Marlborough regional civil defence officer. He served in the latter role until his death, overseeing the response to floods in Marlborough in early July 1983. Hegglun died in Blenheim less than two weeks later, on 22 July 1983, and was buried at Fairhall Cemetery. His wife, Pat Hegglun, died in 2010.
