= 1972 New Zealand National Party leadership election =

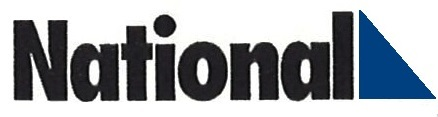
- 7 February 1972
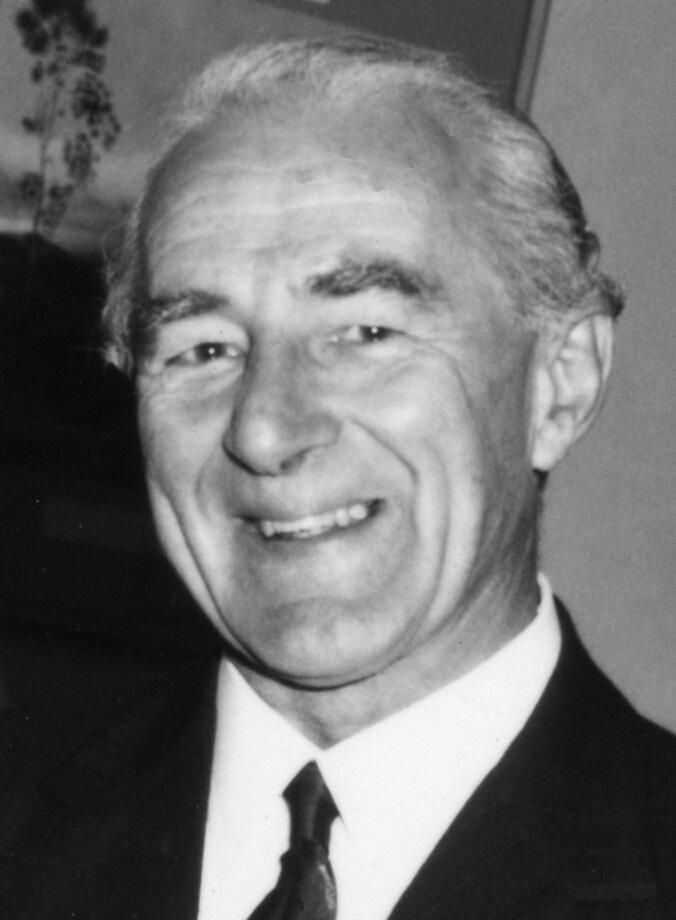

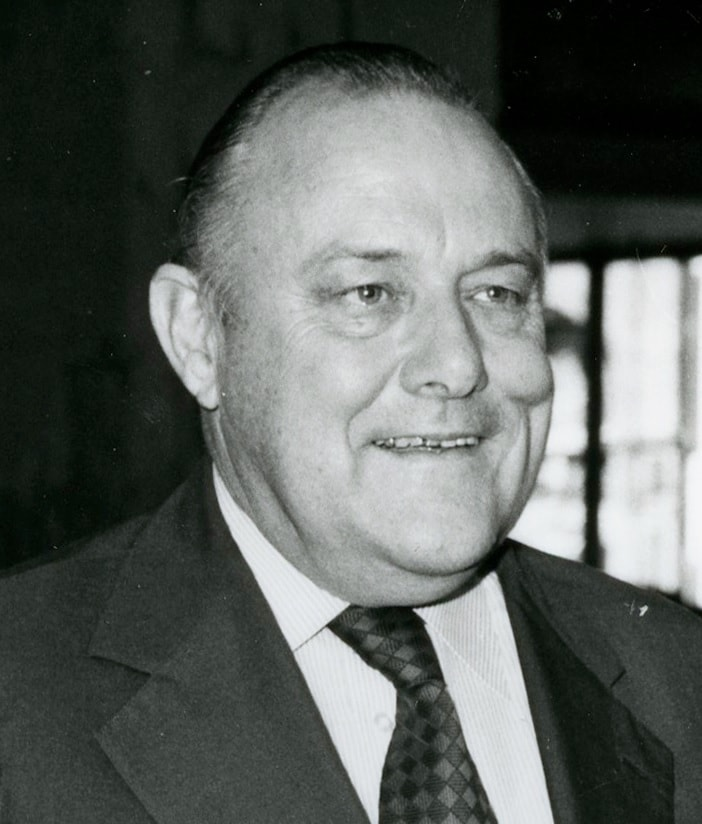
Candidate	Jack Marshall	Robert Muldoon
Popular vote	26	18
Percentage	59.10%	40.90%
Leader before election
Keith Holyoake
Leader after election
Jack Marshall

The New Zealand National Party leadership election was held to determine the leadership of the New Zealand National Party. The election was won by Karori MP Jack Marshall.

== Background ==
Despite seeming likely that National would go on to lose the 1969 election, it won an unexpected fourth term. Prime Minister Keith Holyoake believed Finance Minister Robert Muldoon was mostly to thank for the victory after his strong promotions of National's economic record and plans during the election campaign. As such, there was much press speculation that Muldoon rather than Deputy Prime Minister Jack Marshall might go on to succeed Holyoake as National's leader. Despite winning in 1969, National was embarrassed in 1970 from a huge by-election defeat for the once-safe seat of Marlborough, triggering the media to speculate when Holyoake would retire. By this stage even Marshall, his long-serving loyal deputy, was also in private encouraging him to retire. However it was not until early 1972 that Holyoake finally did step down as leader.

== Candidates ==
=== Jack Marshall ===
Marshall had been the deputy leader of National since 1957. By 1972 Holyoake increasingly relied on him to do a bulk of the government workload. He served as Deputy Prime Minister, Attorney-General, Minister of Justice and later Minister of Customs, Minister of Immigration and Minister of Labour as well. Many thought that after fifteen years as deputy to Holyoake, Marshall had earned his chance to lead the National Party, despite criticisms that he was too old and in too poor health (Marshall had suffered a near fatal heart attack in Tehran several years earlier).

=== Robert Muldoon ===
Muldoon was a high-profile member of the National Party. He had served as Minister of Finance under Holyoake since 1967. Unlike the more reserved personalities of Holyoake and Marshall he was a popular figure with the public and adapted well to the new media of television coverage that other politicians, notably Holyoake, struggled with. As a result, he was largely credited with National's shock win in 1969. Muldoon's supporters in caucus tried to discourage him from standing for the leadership saying that not only was Marshall sure to win, but that National would likely lose the impending election so he should wait until after the election, but Muldoon ignored their advice and challenged anyway.

== Result ==
The election was conducted through a members ballot by National's parliamentary caucus. The following table gives the ballot results:

Name	Votes	Percentage
Jack Marshall	26	59.10%
Robert Muldoon	18	40.90%

== Aftermath ==
Marshall reshuffled cabinet in an attempt to project National as having a new look and direction. However both press and public alike continued to view National as a government twelve years old, despite Marshall's changes. Muldoon was elected unopposed as deputy leader and was utilised by Marshall in advertising campaigns alongside himself in acknowledgement of Muldoon's popularity. Despite this, National went on to lose, as many had anticipated, the 1972 election in a landslide and Marshall became Leader of the Opposition.

== See also ==
- Shadow Cabinet of Jack Marshall (1972–74)
