= Cora Louisa Burrell =

New Zealand politician (1889–1962)

Cora Louisa Burrell MBE (née Keetley, 19 June 1889 – 20 October 1962) from Christchurch was a National Party activist, on the Canterbury Division executive and a Dominion councillor. National Party historian Barry Gustafson said that she was "one of the most important and influential women in the party's early history."

She was appointed a member of the New Zealand Legislative Council on 22 June 1950, one of three woman members of the suicide squad appointed by the First National Government in 1950 to vote for its abolition. The other women appointed in 1950 were Ethel Gould and Agnes Weston. Only two other women, Mary Anderson and Mary Dreaver, had ever been appointed to the council (by Labour, in 1946).

In the 1956 Queen's Birthday Honours, Burrell was appointed a Member of the Order of the British Empire, for social welfare services.
