= Bruce McLeod =

Bruce McLeod may refer to:

- Bruce McLeod (clergyman) (1929–2026), 25th Moderator of the United Church of Canada
- Bruce McLeod (politician) (1890–1966), member of the New Zealand Legislative Council
- Bruce McLeod (rugby union) (1940–1996), New Zealand rugby union player
