= Ethel Gould =

New Zealand politician (1895–1992)

Ethel Marion Gould MBE (née Hirst; 2 February 1895 – 9 March 1992) from Auckland was appointed a member of the New Zealand Legislative Council on 22 June 1950.

== Early life ==
Ethel Marion Hirst was born in Auckland on 2 February 1895. Her father was Frank Hirst. She received her education at the Diocesan School for Girls.

== Awards and recognitions ==
She was one of three female members of the suicide squad appointed by the First National Government in 1950 to vote for its abolition. Other women appointed in 1950 were Cora Louisa Burrell and Agnes Weston. Only two other women, Mary Anderson and Mary Dreaver, had ever been appointed to the council (in 1946).

In the 1946 New Year Honours Gould was appointed a Member of the Order of the British Empire for social welfare services to members of the New Zealand Military Forces.
