= Hilcote Pitts-Brown =

New Zealand politician (1905–1990)

The Honourable Hilcote Pitts-Brown

Member of the New Zealand Legislative Council
- In office 22 June 1950 – 31 December 1950

Personal details
- Born: 22 October 1905
- Died: 12 February 1990 (aged 84)

Hilcote Pitts-Brown (22 October 1905 – 12 February 1990) of Nelson was appointed a member of the New Zealand Legislative Council on 22 June 1950.

He was appointed as a member of the suicide squad nominated by the First National Government in 1950 to vote for the abolition of the council. Most of the new members (like Pitts-Brown) were appointed on 22 June 1950, and served until 31 December 1950 when the council was abolished.

Pitts-Brown was electorate chairman for the National Party in the Nelson electorate in the 1940s.
