= Ed Latter =

New Zealand politician (1928–2016)

- MBE ED

Member of the New Zealand Parliament for Marlborough
- In office 29 November 1975 – 29 November 1975
- Preceded by: Ian Brooks
- Succeeded by: Doug Kidd

Personal details
- Born: Edward Gale Latter; 29 February 1928 Waiau, New Zealand
- Died: 29 August 2016 (aged 88) New Zealand
- Party: National
- Spouse: Anne Morton Ollivier (m. 1952)
- Children: 3
- Profession: Farmer; NZDF (Brig.); Parliamentarian; High Commissioner (Canada & Caribbean); Nat.Director Civil Defence; Historian

Edward Gale Latter MBE ED (29 February 1928 – 29 August 2016) was a New Zealand politician of the National Party.

== Biography ==
New Zealand Parliament
Years	Term	Electorate	Party
1975–1978	38th	Marlborough	National

Latter was born in 1928 at Waiau. His parents were Edward Circuit Le Clere Latter and Moana Latter (née Gale). He received his education from Hapuku Primary, Kaikoura District High School, and Christ's College. He married Anne Morton Ollivier, a daughter of Arthur Ollivier, in 1952.

He represented the Marlborough electorate from 1975. He retired at the next general election in 1978 due to ill-health.

From 1980 to 1985 he was New Zealand's High Commissioner to Canada. Later he returned to New Zealand and was the Director of Civil Defence. During his tenure he coordinated the relief response to Cyclone Bola which hit the North Island in 1988.

Latter is the author of Marching onward: a history of the 2nd Battalion (Canterbury, Nelson, Marlborough, West Coast) Royal New Zealand Infantry Regiment, 1845-1992, about the Nelson Battalion of Militia. In the 1964 New Year Honours, he was appointed a Member of the Military Division of the Order of the British Empire. In 1977, Latter received the Queen Elizabeth II Silver Jubilee Medal, and 13 years later he was awarded the New Zealand 1990 Commemoration Medal.

Latter died on 29 August 2016.

== Notes ==
New Zealand Parliament
Preceded by Ian Brooks	Member of Parliament for Marlborough; 1975–1978	Succeeded by Doug Kidd
Diplomatic posts
Preceded by Dean Eyre	High Commissioner to Canada; 1980–1985	Succeeded by John Wybrow
