= Tom Shand =

New Zealand politician (1911–1969)

The Honourable Tom Shand
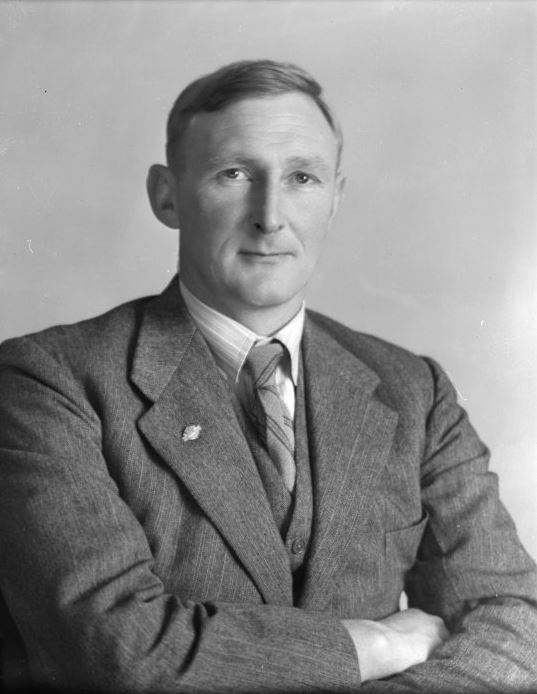

21st Minister of Labour
- In office 12 December 1960 – 11 December 1969
- Prime Minister: Keith Holyoake
- Preceded by: Fred Hackett
- Succeeded by: Jack Marshall

21st Minister of Immigration
- In office 12 December 1960 – 11 December 1969
- Prime Minister: Keith Holyoake
- Preceded by: Fred Hackett
- Succeeded by: Jack Marshall

21st Minister of Mines
- In office 12 December 1960 – 11 December 1969
- Prime Minister: Keith Holyoake
- Preceded by: Fred Hackett
- Succeeded by: Norman Shelton

35th Minister of Civil Aviation
- In office 26 November 1954 – 12 December 1957
- Prime Minister: Sidney Holland; Keith Holyoake
- Preceded by: Tom Macdonald
- Succeeded by: John Mathison

35th Postmaster-General and Minister of Telegraphs
- In office 26 November 1954 – 12 December 1957
- Prime Minister: Sidney Holland; Keith Holyoake
- Preceded by: Walter Broadfoot
- Succeeded by: Mick Moohan

Member of the New Zealand Parliament for Marlborough
- In office 25 September 1943 – 11 December 1969
- Preceded by: Ted Meachen
- Succeeded by: Ian Brooks

Personal details
- Born: 16 April 1911 Ngapara, New Zealand
- Died: 11 December 1969 (aged 58) Wellington, New Zealand
- Party: National
- Spouse: Claudia Lillian Weston (m. 1937)
- Relations: Claude Weston (father-in-law); Agnes Weston (mother-in-law); Carol Shand (daughter); Erich Geiringer (son-in-law)
- Children: 4
- Profession: Farmer

Military service
- Branch/service: Royal New Zealand Air Force
- Years of service: 1943–45
- Rank: Flying Officer
- Battles/wars: World War II

Thomas Philip Shand (16 April 1911 – 11 December 1969) was a New Zealand politician of the National Party.

== Biography ==
=== Early life and career ===
Shand was born in 1911 in Ngapara, North Otago. His parents were Gilbert Esme Tressillian Shand and Constance Kippenberger, both of whom were from prominent Canterbury families, who owned and operated a farm of their own in Ngapara. In 1922 the family moved to Kaikōura, establishing a new farm at Seaward Valley. He received his education at St Andrew's College, Christ's College, the University of Canterbury.

His studies were cut short by the onset of the Great Depression and he returned home to work as a shepherd on the family farm from 1931 to 1933. He then worked freezing and flax industries from 1933 to 1935, taking an active role in trade union affairs. He was also an active sportsman, competing as a boxer while a student and also played sub-union rugby in Canterbury. On 8 February 1937 he married the medical doctor Claudia Lillian Weston. Her father, Claude Weston, was the second president of the National Party. Her mother, Agnes Weston, would later be called to the New Zealand Legislative Council as part of the suicide squad. In 1942 he finally completed his bachelor's degree in commerce.

The same year he completed his degree Shand volunteered for the Royal New Zealand Air Force and began flight training. He was gazetted as a pilot in January 1943 and in June that year he was promoted to Flying Officer. Between April 1944 and February 1945 he flew Hudson bombers and Catalina flying boats in the South Pacific campaign out of Fiji, Funafuti and Emirau. In 1945 he developed a hearing defect which resulted in him being placed on the reserve until World War II ended due to high-tone deafness.

Shand returned to his family farm and proceeded to take a course at Canterbury Agricultural College in farm management.

=== Political career ===
New Zealand Parliament
Years	Term	Electorate	Party
1946–1949	28th	Marlborough	National
1949–1951	29th	Marlborough	National
1951–1954	30th	Marlborough	National
1954–1957	31st	Marlborough	National
1957–1960	32nd	Marlborough	National
1960–1963	33rd	Marlborough	National
1963–1966	34th	Marlborough	National
1966–1969	35th	Marlborough	National
1969	36th	Marlborough	National

He first stood for Parliament in 1943 against the incumbent Labour representative in the Marlborough electorate, Ted Meachen, and was unsuccessful. At the next election in 1946, he was successful and held the Marlborough electorate until his death in 1969. Shand quickly became known in Parliament for his "fiery robustness" and became known as a passionate yet outspoken debater. He gained notoriety in 1947 when he tore up the pages of his copy of the Labour government's budget, though it was subsequently revealed he had cut most of the way through it with scissors beforehand.

In 1953, Shand was awarded the Queen Elizabeth II Coronation Medal.

He was a cabinet minister in the First National Government as Postmaster-General, Minister of Civil Aviation and Minister for Rehabilitation from 1954 to 1957. He oversaw the expansion of Wellington International Airport and also made extra land provisions for returned servicemen, as based on his own experience as a rehabilitated farmer he was supportive of them becoming farmers. On one noted occasion Shand lost an argument in cabinet. Impetuously he said "Well gentlemen, if that's the way you feel about it, I'm getting out" as he left his chair, to which Prime Minister Sidney Holland retorted "Mr. Shand, if you go through that door you won't be coming back again" prompting Shand to hurriedly resume his seat. His elevation to cabinet was owed more to a desire by party leaders to pacify him, thinking it was easier to control the otherwise individualistic Shand if he was in cabinet (and thus bound by cabinet collective responsibility).

From 1957 to 1960, National was in opposition and Shand was designated National's spokesperson for Civil Aviation by party leader Keith Holyoake.

During the Second National Government he was Minister of Labour (1960–1969), Minister of Immigration (1960–1969), and Minister of Mines (1960–1969), and Minister of Electricity (1963–1969). Prime Minister Keith Holyoake allotted him fifth place in his cabinet in recognition of Shand's strong performance critiquing the Second Labour Government from 1957 to 1960. Shand was also appointed chairman of the Cabinet Committee on Government Administration where he played a major role in reorganising government administration by legislating the State Services Act, 1962.

Shand's most prominent role was as Minister of Labour. He always made a point of knowing what went on at the location of a workplace dispute and built good working relationships with the trade union leaders at the New Zealand Federation of Labour (FOL), earning their trust and admiration for his directness and courage. He perpetually emphasised the importance of workplace productivity and developed an active interest in a whole range of workforce related issues. He oversaw the investigation and verdict of the Woodhouse Report in 1966, chaired by Owen Woodhouse, which proposed a radical "no-fault" accident compensation system (which later became the Accident Compensation Corporation). He broke ranks with the rest of cabinet in 1968 and joined the FOL in its opposition to the "nil wage order", however cabinet voted for it anyway to ensure an end to the practice of wage fixing by the Court of Arbitration. Shand had a predilection for "buying" industrial peace by accommodating (partially at least) higher wage demands which often caused problems for other ministers as it caused inflation and higher taxation.

Shand lobbied Holyoake for the role of Minister of Finance following the death of Harry Lake in 1967. Ultimately he was passed over for the position in favour of Robert Muldoon, a junior minister. The rumored cause of this was a reported disagreement between Shand and Holyoake over the government's economic policies which also resulted in Shand relinquishing the chairmanship of the Cabinet Committee on Government Administration. Shand congratulated Muldoon, the only minister to do so on an individual basis, and promised to support him so long as he stuck to traditional conservative financial policies. This was not to be the case and the two developed a rivalry with each other in the cabinet. This was despite the two being similar personalities, both being forthright, individualistic and having the habit of taking decisions beyond the cabinet into the public arena.

Shand was one of the first politicians in New Zealand to grasp the significance that Britain's membership of the European Economic Community would have for New Zealand. He likewise understood the importance of international investment and became an early advocate for New Zealand joining the International Monetary Fund and the World Bank.

Shand was seen as a likely successor to Holyoake as National Party leader following his 20 years in Parliament, 12 of them as an energetic and effective minister. Such an outcome was unable to come to fruition following the onset of lung cancer for Shand in early 1969 when speculation surrounding Holyoake's retirement was increasing.

=== Death ===
Shand had been a smoker all his life and was seldom seen without his pipe in his mouth. Just after the 1969 election campaign had begun he was hospitalised. Shand died as a result of lung cancer on 11 December 1969, just twelve days after being re-elected in that year's general election.

In the 1970 by-election, his son Anthony Shand stood as the National candidate to replace him, but was defeated in the greatest swing against a government since the 1935 general election. His daughter, Dr Carol Shand, had married the physician Erich Geiringer in 1964.

Shand's premature death eliminated him as a potential successor to the party leadership which may have delayed Holyoake's retirement. Ironically National's shock defeat at the Marlborough by-election was one of the major factors in inducing Holyoake's eventual retirement in February 1972.

== Notes ==
Political offices
Preceded by Fred Hackett	Minister of Labour; 1960–1969	Succeeded by Jack Marshall
Preceded by Fred Hackett	Minister of Immigration; 1960–1969	Succeeded by Jack Marshall
Preceded by Fred Hackett	Minister of Mines; 1960–1969	Succeeded by Norman Shelton
Preceded by Tom Macdonald	Minister of Civil Aviation; 1954–1957	Succeeded by John Mathison
Preceded by Walter Broadfoot	Postmaster-General and Minister of Telegraphs; 1954–1957	Succeeded by Mick Moohan
New Zealand Parliament
Preceded by Ted Meachen	Member of Parliament for Marlborough; 1946–1969	Succeeded by Ian Brooks
