= Ethel Benjamin =

New Zealand lawyer (1875–1943)

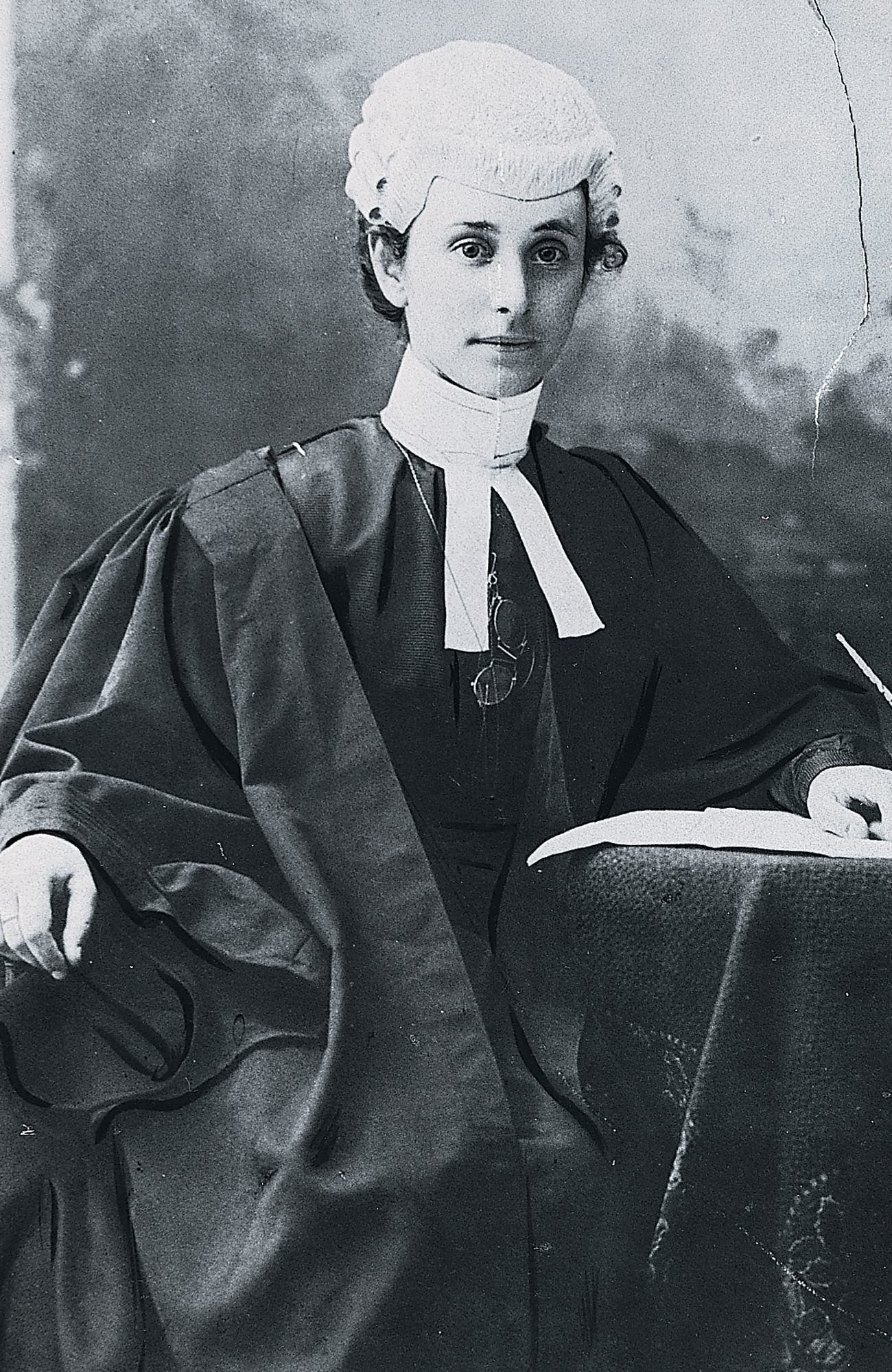
- Born: 19 January 1875; Dunedin, New Zealand
- Died: 14 October 1943 (aged 68); Northwood, Middlesex, England
- Other name: De Costa
- Education: University of New Zealand
- Occupations: Lawyer, businesswoman
- Years active: 1897–1943
- Known for: New Zealand's first female lawyer

Ethel Rebecca Benjamin (19 January 1875 – 14 October 1943) was New Zealand's first female lawyer. On 17 September 1897, she became the first woman in the British Empire to appear as counsel in court, representing a client for the recovery of a debt. She was the second woman in the Empire to be admitted as a barrister and solicitor, two months after Clara Brett Martin of Canada.

== Early life ==
Benjamin was born in Dunedin, to Lizzie Mark and Henry Benjamin. Lizzie and Henry had emigrated from England in the late 1860s. Harry became a Dunedin sharebroker. The family were Orthodox Jews. Benjamin was the eldest in a family of five girls and two boys. She attended Otago Girls' High School from 1883 to 1892. While there, she won the "Victoria" prize for order, diligence and punctuality, and also an Education Board Junior Scholarship.

== Legal career ==
In 1892 Benjamin won a university scholarship, and in 1893 she enrolled at the University of Otago for an LLB degree, not knowing if she would be able to practice law on completion:

It is true that the Legal Profession was not then open to women, and that the franchise had not yet been granted, but I had faith that a colony so liberal as our own would not long tolerate such purely artificial barriers. I therefore entered on my studies with a light heart, feeling sure that I should not long be debarred from the use of any degree I might obtain.

Benjamin graduated in July 1897, having achieved outstanding marks in her course. The Female Law Practitioners Act was passed in 1896 and on 10 May 1897 she was admitted as a barrister and solicitor of the Supreme Court of New Zealand (now called High Court of New Zealand).

Upon her graduation, Benjamin was asked to speak on behalf of all the graduates. She is reported to have said:

It was only yesterday that I was asked to undertake this pleasant task, and while deeply sensible to the compliment paid to me, I was somewhat diffident about taking so much upon myself at so short a notice. But I knew that little would be expected of me and even if I succeeded in talking nonsense, the charitable verdict would be, 'Oh well, it is all that can be expected of a woman.'

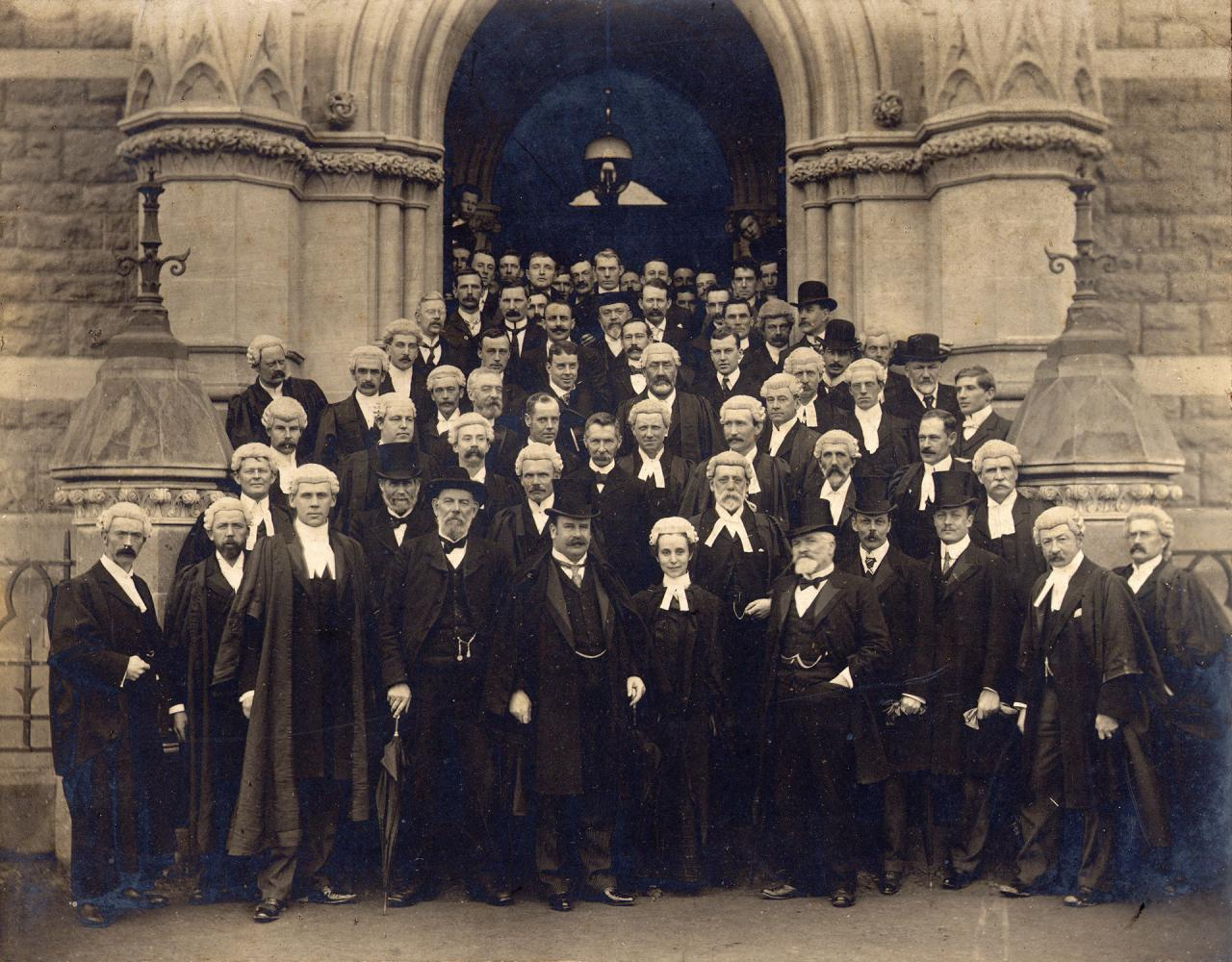
Ethel Benjamin (centre front) at the opening of Dunedin Law Courts in 1902

Despite receiving adverse treatment from the Otago District Law Society at the time, such as restricted access to the society's library, she opened and ran a successful legal practice in Princes Street, primarily as a solicitor. Her cases included wife abuse, divorce, and adoption. Developing her private practice wasn't easy. The Law Society made things difficult for her by not inviting her to official functions such as their annual dinner, and tried to enforce a dress code on her. Her main sources of clients were the Jewish community and women with financial interests. She also represented several hotels and publicans' associations on matters related to prohibition - she was one of the few nineteenth-century New Zealand feminists who didn't support temperance.

Ethel Benjamin was a founding member of the Dunedin branch of the New Zealand Society for the Protection of Women and Children (founded in 1899) and was its honorary solicitor.

== Marriage and relocations ==
In 1906 Ethel Benjamin moved to Christchurch and managed a restaurant at the International Exhibition. She married Alfred Mark Ralph De Costa, a Wellington sharebroker, in 1907, and moved to live with him in Wellington. She continued her legal practice, in an office adjacent to her husband's, and began to specialise in property speculation. In 1908, the De Costas moved to England and during World War I Ethel De Costa managed a bank in Sheffield. She also worked in a law firm, but couldn't practise law fully until the Sex Disqualification (Removal) Act was passed in 1919. Between the wars, the De Costas lived in southern France and Italy. Alfred died just before the Second World War started, but Ethel continued to work as a lawyer in London. Ethel was accidentally struck by a motor vehicle, and died of a fractured skull at Mount Vernon Hospital in Northwood, Middlesex, England, on 14 October 1943.

== Legacy ==
The Ethel Benjamin Prize for women was established in 1997 by the New Zealand Law Foundation, to mark the centenary of the admission of Ethel Benjamin as New Zealand's first woman barrister and solicitor. As of 2007 the $20,000 NZD prize is awarded annually, to two female recipients. Past recipients include Claudia Geiringer (2001) and Jessica Palmer (2004).

Ethel Benjamin Place, a cul-de-sac across the road from the University of Otago Central Library, was named after the lawyer, during Suffrage Centennial Year 1993.

== See also ==
- Cornelia Sorabji in India
- Eliza Orme in England
- First women lawyers around the world
- Ivy Williams in England
