= Agnes Weston (politician) =

New Zealand politician

The Honourable Agnes Weston

Member of the New Zealand Legislative Council
- In office 22 June 1950 – 31 December 1950

Personal details
- Born: Agnes Louisa Steuart; 18 January 1879 Manutahi, New Zealand
- Died: 8 August 1972 (aged 93) Wellington, New Zealand
- Spouse: Claude Weston (m. 1905)
- Relations: Thomas Shailer Weston Jr. (brother-in-law); Tom Shand (son-in-law)
- Children: two

Agnes Louisa Weston (née Steuart, 18 January 1879 – 8 August 1972) from Wellington was appointed a member of the New Zealand Legislative Council on 22 June 1950.

Steuart was born on 18 January 1879 at Manutahi, the daughter of Frederick Jeffray Steuart and Alice Mary (née Corrigan). Her father was mayor of Stratford in 1900 and 1901.

On 17 Jun 1905, Steuart married Claude Weston at St James' Church, Sydney. Her husband would later effectively be the first president of the National Party (1936–1940). Claude Weston participated in World War I and was wounded in 1916 when he had risen to the rank of major. In World War II, Agnes Louisa Weston was a member of the women's section of the Returned Servicemen's Association (RSA) and was elected chairperson of the committee that encouraged social contact between women related to men in active service. They initially lived in New Plymouth, where her husband had his law practice, but moved to Auckland in 1931. This was followed by a move to Wellington in 1933. The Westons had one daughter and one son. Their daughter, a medical doctor, would marry Tom Shand who later was a member of parliament.

In the 1946 election, Claude Weston was a candidate for the National Party in the Wellington Central electorate. He died suddenly on 10 November 1946 in Wellington, and she replaced him as a candidate. The election was won by Charles Chapman of the Labour Party. She was one of three female members of the suicide squad, which was appointed by the First National Government in 1950 to vote for its abolition. The other women appointed in 1950 were Cora Louisa Burrell and Ethel Gould. Only two other women, Mary Anderson and Mary Dreaver, had ever been appointed to the council (in 1946).

Weston was the president of the Women's Auxiliary RSA in 1946.

Weston died in Wellington on 8 August 1972, aged 93.

== See also ==
- Women's Auxiliary Army Corps (New Zealand)
