= Ted Meachen =

New Zealand politician

Ted Meachen MBE JP
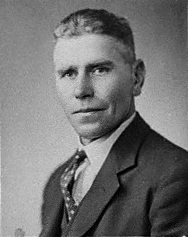

Member of the New Zealand Parliament for Wairau
- In office 27 November 1935 – 15 October 1938
- Preceded by: Edward Healy
- Succeeded by: seat abolished

Member of the New Zealand Parliament for Marlborough
- In office 15 October 1938 – 27 November 1946
- Preceded by: Edward Healy
- Succeeded by: Tom Shand

27th Mayor of Blenheim
- In office 1953–1962
- Preceded by: Bert Mitchell
- Succeeded by: Sid Harling

Personal details
- Born: Edwin Purcell Meachen; 11 November 1895 Wanganui, New Zealand
- Died: 11 July 1970 (aged 74) Blenheim, New Zealand
- Party: Labour
- Relatives: Tristan Hegglun (son-in-law); Greg Hegglun (great-grandson)

Edwin Purcell Meachen MBE JP (11 November 1895 – 11 July 1970) was a New Zealand politician of the Labour Party.

== Biography ==
=== Early life and career ===
Meachen was born in Whanganui in 1895. He was educated at Christchurch Marist Brothers' School and worked as a builder afterwards. During World War I he served in the New Zealand Expeditionary Force. He fought in Gallipoli and France and was wounded twice.

He resumed building after the war and also represented Mid-Canterbury at rugby union (1921–23) and Canterbury at rugby league (1924). He then moved to the King Country and was employed by the Ministry of Works building bridges and houses for railways. During this time he became active in the New Zealand Workers' Union and joined the Labour Party. In 1930 he relocated to Marlborough to construct a railway camp at Wharanui.

=== Political career ===
New Zealand Parliament
Years	Term	Electorate	Party
1935–1938	25th	Wairau	Labour
1938–1943	26th	Marlborough	Labour
1943–1946	27th	Marlborough	Labour

He represented the Marlborough electorates of Wairau from 1935 to 1938, and then Marlborough from 1938 to 1946 when he was defeated. He first stood for Wairau in 1931.

Meachen was Parliamentary Under-Secretary to the Minister of Works from 1945 to 1946.

He was the Mayor of Blenheim from 1953 to 1962 and Chairman of the Marlborough Catchment Board from its inception in 1955 until his death 1970. He was appointed a Member of the Order of the British Empire, for services to the community, particularly to local government, in the 1968 Queen's Birthday Honours.

=== Later life and death ===
Meachen died in 1970 and was buried at Omaka Cemetery, Blenheim.

== Notes ==
New Zealand Parliament
Preceded by Edward Healy	Member of Parliament for Wairau; 1935–1938	Constituency abolished
New constituency	Member of Parliament for Marlborough; 1938–1946	Succeeded by Tom Shand
Political offices
Preceded by Bert Mitchell	Mayor of Blenheim; 1953–1962	Succeeded by Sid Harling
