= Hans Leo Przibram =

Austrian biologist

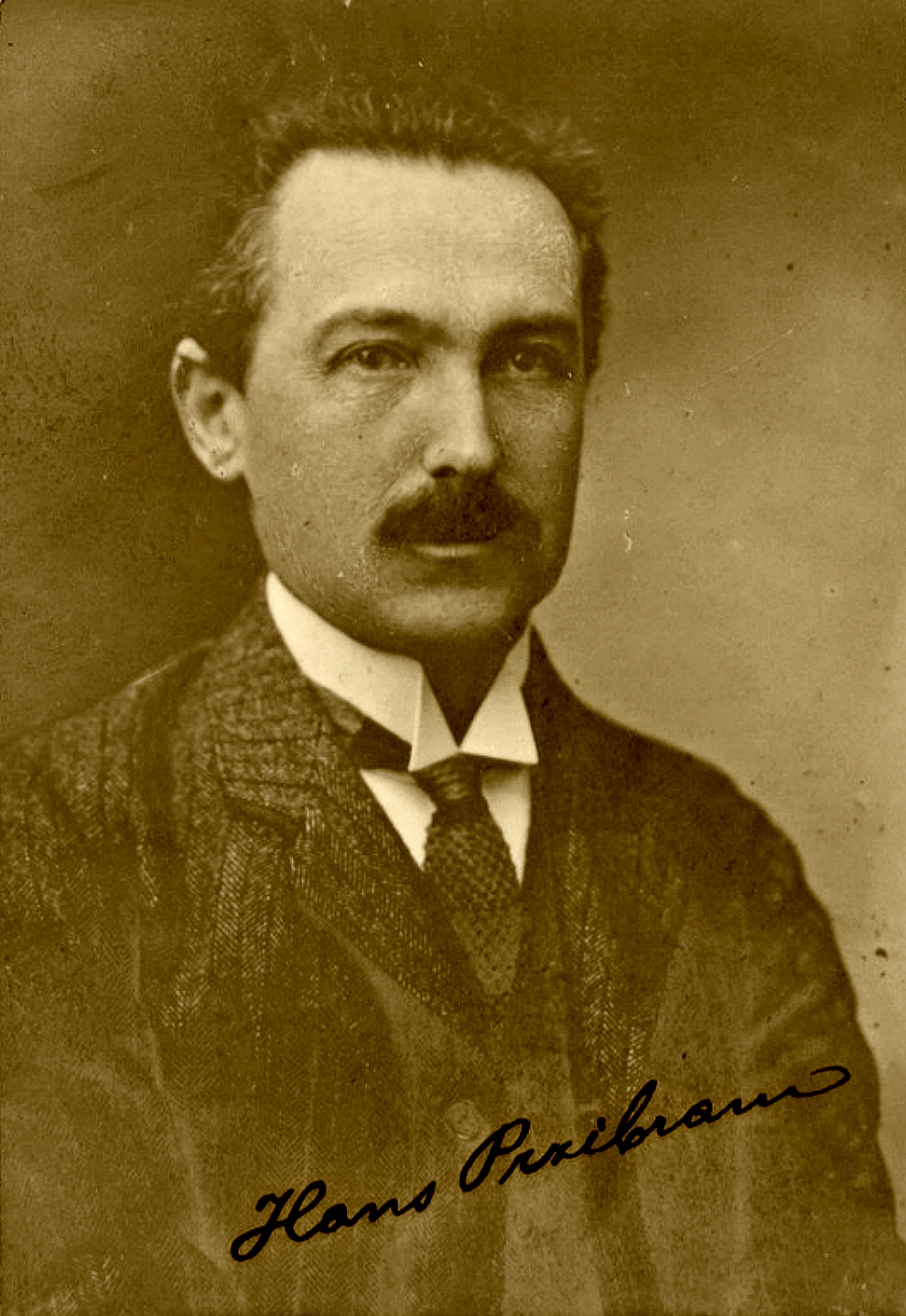
- Born: 7 July 1874; Vienna, Austro-Hungarian Empire
- Died: 20 May 1944 (aged 70); Theresienstadt concentration camp, Czechoslovakia
- Citizenship: Austro-Hungarian Empire
- Scientific career
- Fields: Developmental biology
- Workplaces: Biological Research Institute of the Vienna Academy of Sciences
- Doctoral students: Paul Alfred Weiss; Martha Geiringer

Hans Leo Przibram ([ˈpʃɪbram]; 7 July 1874 – 20 May 1944) was an Austrian biologist who founded the biological laboratory in Vienna.

== Career ==
Hans was the elder son of Gustav and Charlotte Przibram. His mother was the daughter of Friedrich Schey von Koromla.

After attending the Academic Gymnasium in Vienna, he studied Zoology under Berthold Hatschek at the University of Vienna. In 1899 he graduated as medical doctor and Doctor of Philosophy. He received his habilitation at the University of Vienna in 1904 and from then on taught as a lecturer in zoology. In 1913, he became Professor of Experimental Zoology.

In 1902, together with the botanists Leopold von Portheim and Wilhelm Figdor, Hans Przibram bought the "Vivarium" in the Vienna Prater and set up a private research institute for experimental biology, the "Biologische Versuchsanstalt" (BVA), which opened in the following year. In 1914, the BVA donated to the Academy of Sciences in Vienna, together with a foundation that ensured continued operations. Przibram continued to lead the zoological department and, together with Portheim, the entire BVA. The University of Halle appointed Hans Przibram an honorary doctorate in 1917, followed in 1929 by an honorary doctorate from the University of Riga.

Being Jewish, he was persecuted under National Socialism, and on 1 May 1938 dismissed and expelled from the University of Vienna. His brother, the physicist Karl Przibram, in 1938 was also expelled as a teacher from the University of Vienna. Hans Przibam was also unable to continue his work as Head of the Department of Biological Research at the Academy of Sciences in Vienna, where he had been practicing for 35 years. From 13 April 1938, he and all other Jewish employees were forbidden to enter. He also had to leave his private library behind. The new head of the BVA, NSDAP member Franz Köck, in 1939 also reported Przibam to the Property Transaction Office, and subsequently confiscated his assets. Together with his wife Elisabeth, Hans Przibram was able to flee to Amsterdam in December 1939 but they were deported on 21 April 1943 to the ghetto at Theresienstadt, where he and his wife both died.

== Evolution ==
Przibram was an advocate of orthogenesis. He proposed a theory known as "apogenesis". Science historian Igor Popov has noted that Przibram "rejected both the transformation of one species into another and the existence of genealogical trees. He believed that the major animal groups evolved in parallel rows, considering this process as analogous to the growth of crystals."

He was a critic of natural selection and neo-Darwinism.
