= John Southgate Allen =

New Zealand politician (1883–1955)

John Southgate Allen (3 January 1883 – 11 November 1955) of Tirau was appointed a member of the New Zealand Legislative Council on 27 July 1950.

He was appointed as a member of the suicide squad nominated by the First National Government in 1950 to vote for the abolition of the council. Most of the new members were appointed on 22 June 1950, but three more members including Allen were appointed on 27 July 1950.
