= 1970 Marlborough by-election =

New Zealand by-election

← 1969 general	21 February 1970	1972 general →
- Turnout: 14,730 (78.31%)
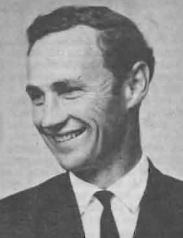

Candidate	Ian Brooks	Andy Shand
Party	Labour	National
Popular vote	7,060	6,017
Percentage	47.93	40.85
MP before election
Tom Shand
National
Elected MP
Ian Brooks
Labour

The Marlborough by-election of 1970 was a by-election for the electorate of Marlborough, held on 21 February 1970 during the 30th New Zealand Parliament.

== Background ==
The by-election resulted from the death of Tom Shand on 11 December 1969, only 12 days after he (and the government) had been re-elected on 29 November; and the new National candidate was defeated by the greatest swing against a government since the 1935 general election, in what was a largely rural electorate generally regarded a safe National seat. Tom Shand had held the seat from 1946, when he defeated Labour’s Ted Meachen.

== Candidates ==
Labour

The Labour Party selected Ian Brooks as their candidate. In 1969 he had stood in the electorate.

National

There were five nominees who came forward for the National Party candidacy:

- Bruno Dalliessi, the Mayor of Picton
- R. J. Doak, a farmer from Amberley who was National's 1969 campaign manager in Rangiora
- R. W. Palmer, a farmer from Wairau Valley
- Norra Woodbane Pomare, a farmer from Wellington who was National's candidate for Southern Maori in 1969
- Anthony "Andy" Shand, a farmer and member of the Kaikoura County Council – son of the previous member

Shand was chosen to contest the seat at the party selection committee meeting.

Social Credit

There were two candidates for the Social Credit Party nomination:

- George Kerr, a farmer from Seddon
- Jeremy Woodhall, a registered surveyor from Blenheim

Kerr was selected. It was the seventh consecutive time he had contested the seat, having done so at every previous election since 1954.

== Campaign ==
The vote for Tom Shand had been close in 1966. Labour only decided that the seat was winnable in January, and sent in two MPs Arthur Faulkner and Colin Moyle to organise the campaign. Labour's candidate, Brooks, was local; he was a senior clerk in the Picton manual telephone exchange and also had a small farm. The seat was largely rural, but Brooks polled particularly well in Picton, and well in the other two population centres, Blenheim and Kaikōura. At the end of the campaign there was some criticism of Andy Shand for frequent "butting-in" during a combined television broadcast appearance for all the candidates on Wednesday 17 February.

== Results ==
The following table gives the election results:

1970 Marlborough by-election
Party	Candidate	Votes	%	±%
Labour	Ian Brooks	7,060	47.93	+9.29
National	Andy Shand	6,017	40.85	
Social Credit	George Kerr	1,171	7.95	−0.29
Country Party	Clifford Stanley Emeny	482	3.27	
Majority		1,043	7.08	
Turnout		14,730	78.31	−13.33
Registered electors		18,809		

The election-night margin to Labour of 1131 was so great that the final result was not expected to change when special votes, which generally tended to go to National, were counted. There were 32 informal votes.

George Chapman was the Wellington National Party chairman. He heard reports that all was not well in the campaign, the party was in deep trouble, and that Labour was making an all-out effort. But he found that party president Ned Holt was complacent about the by-election; saying that everything was in order, and that in any case National's majority in Marlborough was big enough to absorb any setback. But on by-election night Labour inflicted a stunning defeat on National, reducing the Government majority from six to four, and shaking party confidence. Chapman became the leader for change in the organisation, resulting in his nomination for party president in 1971, although he did not become president until 1973.

Despite winning a surprise victory in 1969, National was so embarrassed from the by-election defeat it triggered the media to seriously speculate about Prime Minister Keith Holyoake's retirement.
