= Jessica Palmer (academic) =

New Zealand academic lawyer

- Born: 1980 (age 45–46)
- Education: University of Cambridge, University of Auckland
- Awards: Ethel Benjamin scholarship
- Scientific career
- Fields: Trusts and civil remedies
- Workplaces: University of Otago

Jessica Palmer is a New Zealand academic lawyer, as of 2019 is a full professor and dean of law at the University of Otago. She is also Pro-Vice-Chancellor of the Division of Humanities.

== Academic career ==
After an undergraduate degree at the University of Auckland Palmer completed LLM's at the University of Cambridge and the University of Auckland, before rising to professor and dean of law at the University of Otago, replacing Mark Henaghan. In 2020 Palmer was appointed Pro-Vice-Chancellor of the Humanities Division.

Palmer is a Chartered Member of the Institute of Directors.

== Awards ==
In 2004, Palmer received the Ethel Benjamin Prize. In 2015, Palmer received the Carl Smith Medal and Rowheath Trust Award from Otago University. The award recognises outstanding research by early career researchers.

== Selected works ==
- Law and Policy in Modern Family Finance: Property Division in the 21st Century ISBN 1780684649
- Civil Remedies in New Zealand – 2nd edition ISBN 9780864727329
