= Allen Alexander =

New Zealand politician

Leonard Allen Alexander (26 September 1903 – 21 August 1968) was a New Zealand politician, appointed a member of the New Zealand Legislative Council on 22 June 1950.

He was appointed as a member of the suicide squad nominated by the First National Government in 1950 to vote for the abolition of the council. Most of the new members (like Alexander) were appointed on 22 June 1950, and served until 31 December 1950 when the council was abolished.

In 1953, Alexander was awarded the Queen Elizabeth II Coronation Medal.
