= Weston House =

New Zealand historic building (1924–2011)

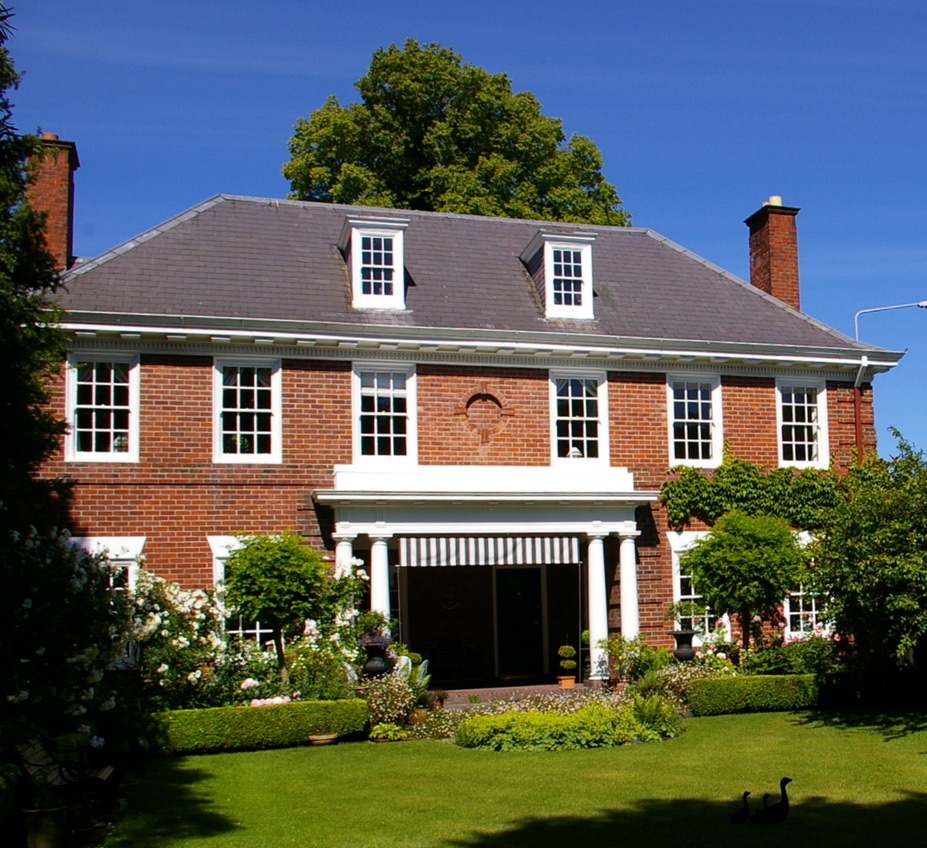
- Weston House in 2006
- Interactive map of the Weston House area
- Alternative names: The Weston House

General information
- Type: Residential home
- Architectural style: Neo-Georgian architecture
- Location: Christchurch Central City, 62 Park Terrace, Christchurch, New Zealand
- Coordinates: 43.5253°S 172.6288°E
- Completed: 1924
- Renovated: 1997 onwards
- Demolished: July 2011
- Owner: George Weston

Technical details
- Structural system: brick
- Floor count: two

Design and construction
- Architect: Cecil Wood

Heritage New Zealand – Category 1
- Designated: 7 April 1983
- Reference no.: 309

Weston House was a substantial two-storey heritage building in Christchurch, New Zealand, designed by architect Cecil Wood in Neo-Georgian style for George Weston, and completed in 1924. Registered as a Category I heritage building since 1983, it was demolished after the 2011 Christchurch earthquake.

== George Weston ==
George Weston (1876–1957) was a prominent lawyer in Christchurch. His father, Thomas S. Weston (1836–1912), was a judge and took the unusual step of resigning and rejoining the bar, setting up the practice of T. S. Weston and Co in Christchurch in 1883. George Weston was admitted to the bar in 1898 and his father took him into partnership in 1901 when he returned to Christchurch, with the firm then known as T. S. Weston and son. Weston Sr. died in 1912 and, after having served in World War I, George Weston took Robert B. Ward into partnership in September 1919, with the name of the practice changed to Weston and Ward. In June 1921, they took William Ross Lascelles into partnership, with the firm's name changing to Weston, Ward and Lascelles, and by which the firm is still known today.

In 1923, Weston announced his engagement to Maude Cargill. Some time before that, he engaged the then leading architect Cecil Wood to design a stately house for him.

== Design and construction ==
By the time that Christchurch architect Cecil Wood received the commission for Weston House, he was regarded as Canterbury's leading designer of domestic buildings. He produced the design for the Hare Memorial Library at Christ's College in 1916; this was his first commission for the school. Weston was on the school's board as the graduates' representative until his resignation in 1916 to go to war. When the board of Christ's College became a partially elected body, Weston was one of those elected in September 1919 and would from then on have been involved in granting further commissions to Wood on behalf of the school.

It is not known when exactly Weston commissioned Wood to design a stately home for himself. According to the last owners of the building, craftsmen from England came to New Zealand especially for this project and that it took two years to build, with completion in 1924. In September 1924, Maude Weston advertised for housekeeping staff. The double-brick house was located at 62 Park Terrace, overlooking North Hagley Park and the Avon River / Ōtākaro, with its main façade oriented towards the street. The hipped roof gave it a distinctive look. Set back on its section, Weston House contributed to the streetscape in the wider area.

== Heritage registration ==
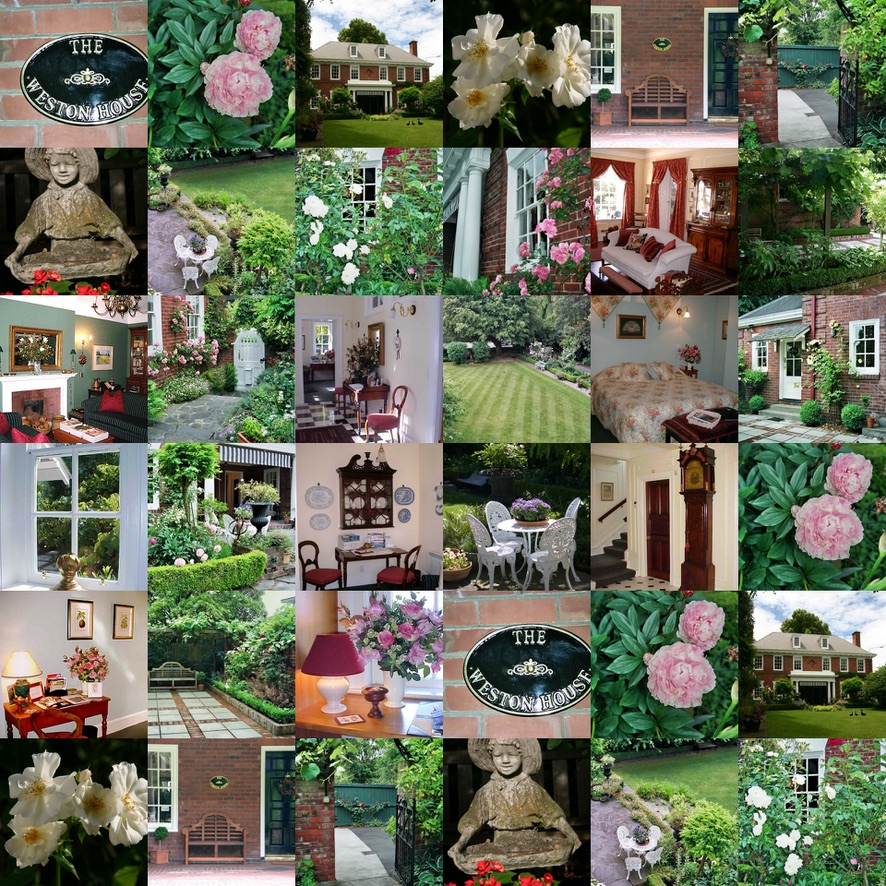
Weston House under its last owners

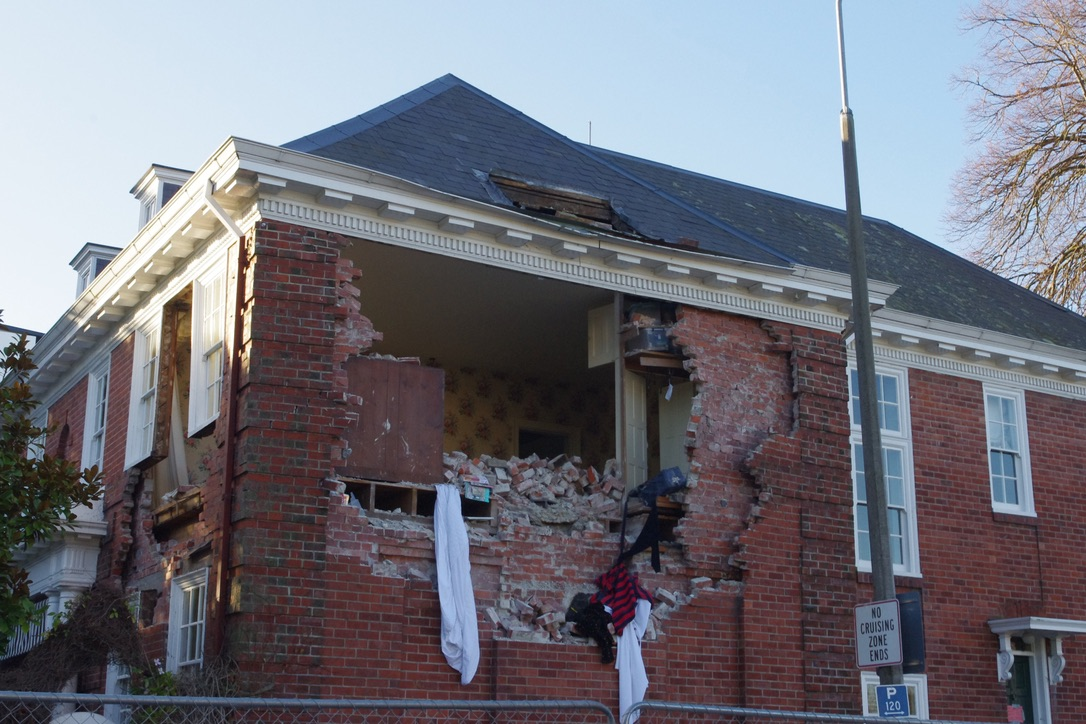
Weston House suffering from extensive earthquake damage, June 2011

The New Zealand Historic Places Trust (since renamed Heritage New Zealand) added Weston House to its register on 7 April 1983 classified as a category B structure with registration number 309. The classification system was later changed and Category A and B entries became Category I listings. In 1995, the New Zealand Historic Places Trust registered the Park Terrace Historic Area with registration number 7058, with Weston House one of sixteen of the individual listings.

== Ownership and fate ==
Weston House was still in the ownership of the Weston family by the time of the 1983 historic listing. Miles Warren, who had been apprenticed to Cecil Wood, was commissioned in 1985 to convert the service wing of the house to a self-contained flat. Warren created a new entrance to the flat by adding a door in the south wall of the building, facing Peterborough Street, but took care to maintain the character of Wood's original design.

The last owners, Stephanie and Len May, purchased the building in 1997 when it was in need of significant renovation. The first earthquake in September 2010 felled a chimney, damaged the roof and internal plaster. Repairs saw the house reopen as a bed and breakfast by November 2010. The 2010 Boxing Day earthquake further damaged the building and the bed and breakfast had to close again. Damage was substantial after the February 2011 earthquake and the house was red-stickered by the authorities, meaning that access was prohibited. Despite that, the owners continued to retrieve their possessions but stopped entering the building after the June 2011 earthquake, when further damage was sustained. Weston House was demolished in July 2011. The Christchurch newspaper The Press featured significant buildings damaged by the earthquake, with Weston House part of the page.
