= Allan Cockerell =

New Zealand soldier and politician (1891–1975)

Allan Richmond Cockerell DSO (21 November 1891 – 7 February 1975) was a New Zealand soldier and politician. He was appointed a member of the New Zealand Legislative Council on 22 June 1950.

He was appointed as a member of the suicide squad nominated by the First National Government in 1950 to vote for the abolition of the council. Most of the new members (like Cockerell) were appointed on 22 June 1950, and served until 31 December 1950 when the council was abolished.

As a second lieutenant serving with the Otago Battalion during World War I, Cockerell was appointed a Companion of the Distinguished Service Order, for actions at Passchendaele on 12 October 1917.
