= Claude Weston =

New Zealand lawyer, soldier, and politician

Claude Weston DSO KC
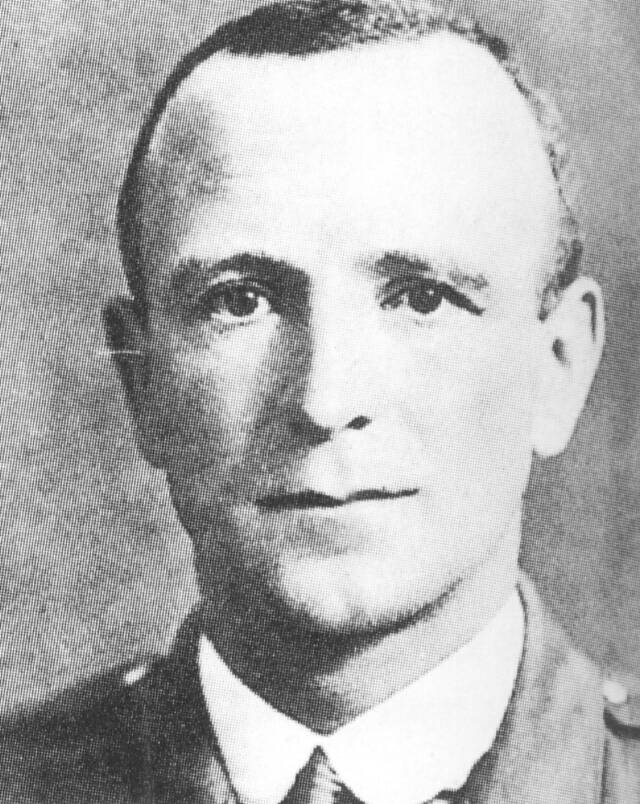

2nd President of the National Party
- In office 1936–1940
- Preceded by: Sir George Wilson
- Succeeded by: Alex Gordon

Personal details
- Born: 28 December 1879 Hokitika, New Zealand
- Died: 10 November 1946 (aged 66) Wellington, New Zealand
- Party: National
- Spouse: Agnes Weston
- Relations: Thomas Shailer Weston Jr. (brother); Warwick Weston (uncle); Tom Shand (son-in-law)
- Parent: Thomas S. Weston

Claude Horace Weston DSO KC (28 December 1879 – 10 November 1946) was a New Zealand lawyer, a lieutenant-colonel in World War I, and effectively the first president of the National Party (1936–1940).

== Early life ==
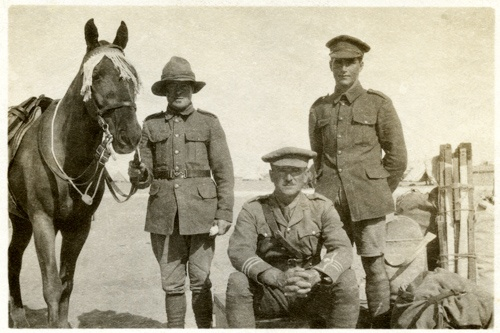
Major Claude Weston (sitting) with his horse Billy in Egypt, in February or March 1916. The two other soldiers in the picture are Billy's groom and Weston's batman (servant).

Weston was born in Hokitika in 1879. His parents were Maria Cracroft Weston (née Hill) and Thomas S. Weston, and judge and later a member of the House of Representatives for electorates on the West Coast of the South Island. Claude Weston received his secondary education at Christ's College and graduated with LL.B. from the Canterbury University College. Weston was a Captain of the Taranaki Rifles.

Together with his elder brother Thomas Shailer Weston Jr., he took over his father's legal practice in November 1902, with offices in New Plymouth, Inglewood, and Waitara. Their firm was known as Weston & Weston. He was appointed crown prosecutor in 1915. In the same year, he joined the Wellington Infantry Battalion and embarked on 14 August for Suez in Egypt. He became a lieutenant-colonel and was awarded a Distinguished Service Order in the 1918 New Year Honours. The citation reads:

For gallantry and devotion to duty. This Officer’s work throughout has been of a very high order. He has earned the respect of all ranks for his coolness and leadership in action. When commanding 2nd Battalion, Wellington Regiment during the action at Messines and La Basse Ville his work was excellent and the success of the Battalion in these operations was largely due to his work and example.

He was severely wounded in the war and was eventually discharged as unfit for further service. He wrote a book about his war time experiences, Three Years with the New Zealanders, which was published in 1918. He returned to New Plymouth, where he resumed law practice, but also engaged in farming. He was commandant of the New Zealand command of the Legion of Frontiersmen from 1926 to 1933, and was chairman of the New Plymouth repatriation committee.

He resigned as crown solicitor in New Plymouth in 1931 before he moved to Auckland. At the end of 1933 he moved to Wellington.

Weston was sworn in as King's Counsel on 12 March 1934 at the Wellington Supreme Court. Others who took silk at the same ceremony were Alexander Johnstone and John Callan. Michael Myers as Chief Justice presided, four other judges sat on the bench, and the Speaker of the House of Representatives (Charles Statham) and the Minister of Justice (John Cobbe) attended in official capacity. In 2013, the Crown Law Office published a list of King's and Queen's Counsel appointed since 1907, but Weston is missing from that list, and according to the Law Society, he is the only omission on the official list. By coincidence, a Claude Weston from Sydney, New South Wales was appointed King's Counsel just a month earlier. Whilst they were not related, they later met.

== Political activity ==
The United Party (known as the Liberal Party until 1927, except for a short period between 1925 and 1927 when it used the name "National Party") and the Reform Party were in a coalition, known as the United–Reform Coalition, since 1931. Weston was one of the key figures who organised a conference for 13 and 14 May 1936. Together with two others, he drew up a draft constitution prior to the conference, and he was chosen as chairman for the conference. The outcome was the formation of the New Zealand National Party through the merger of United and Reform. At the conference, Weston proposed Sir George Wilson as the party's president, and the motion was carried. Within a week, Wilson was forced to make a decision between the presidency or a directorship of the New Zealand Insurance Company, and Wilson decided in favour of the commercial appointment. The presidency thus transferred to Weston, who had the task of overseeing the establishment of the party's Dominion organisation, and he was one of the trustees of the party's periodical, The National News. Whilst The National News performed an important part during the party's formative years, the venture was expensive and following the 1938 election, it was changed to a quarterly schedule, before being discontinued in September 1939 just after the outbreak of the war.

The seven-member Dominion publicity committee, of which Weston was a member, engaged three advertising companies to jointly prepare for the 1938 election. Two of those companies, John Ilott and Charles Haines, remained joint agents for the National Party until 1973. Weston was succeeded as president by Alex Gordon in 1940. Weston was also the first chairman of the Wellington Division of the National Party (1936–1937).

In the 1946 election, Weston was a candidate for the National Party in the Wellington Central electorate. He died suddenly on 10 November 1946 in Wellington and was replaced as a candidate by his wife, Agnes Weston. The election was won by Charles Chapman of the Labour Party. His wife was later appointed onto the New Zealand Legislative Council as part of the suicide squad.

Weston was New Zealand consul to the Netherlands and was appointed Knight of the Order of Orange-Nassau.

== Family ==
Weston married in 1905. His wife was born Agnes Louisa Steuart, the daughter of Fred J. Steuart, who was at one time Mayor of Stratford. The funeral service for Weston was held at St. Paul's Cathedral, after which he was cremated. His wife died in 1972 and was also cremated.

His daughter, Claudia Lillian Weston, trained to become a medical doctor. On 8 February 1937, she married Tom Shand, who became a member of the House of Representatives in the 1946 election for the Marlborough electorate.

== Bibliography ==
- Weston, Claude Horace (1918). Three Years with the New Zealanders : Weston, C H. Skeffington.
- Weston, Claude Horace (1932). Contractors' and Workmen's Liens. Butterworth.
- New Zealand Army; Weston, Claude Horace; Treadwell, Charles Archibald Lawrance (1937). Handbook of Military Law as Applicable to the New Zealand Military Forces. G.H. Loney, Government Printer.
- Weston, Claude Horace (1945). The Ultimate Socialism. Whitcombe & Tombs.

== Notes ==
Party political offices
Preceded by Sir George Wilson	President of the National Party; 1936–1940	Succeeded by Alex Gordon
