= Claudia Geiringer =

New Zealand law professor

Claudia Geiringer FRSNZ
- Born: 1968 (age 57–58)
- Citizenship: New Zealand
- Parents: Erich Geiringer (father); Carol Shand (mother)
- Relatives: Felix Geiringer (brother)
- Scientific career
- Fields: Law
- Institutions: Victoria University of Wellington
- Website: https://people.wgtn.ac.nz/Claudia.Geiringer

Claudia Geiringer FRSNZ (born 1968) is a New Zealand professor of law. In 2022 she was elected a Fellow of the Royal Society Te Apārangi.

== Academic career ==
Geiringer did an LLB at Victoria University of Wellington, a BA (Hons) at the University of Otago and an LL.M. at Columbia Law School in New York City as a Fulbright Scholar, an Ethel Benjamin Scholar and a James Kent Scholar. From 1996 to 2001 Geiringer worked as Crown Counsel in the Bill of Rights team at the Crown Law Office. She received Marsden funding in the 2013 round.

In 2022 Geiringer was elected a Fellow of the Royal Society Te Apārangi. The society said "Geiringer’s multi-award-winning scholarship stands out for its rigour, its elegance, and its high impact. She is the only scholar to have been thrice awarded the Ian Barker award for best published law article. Her work is regularly relied on by judges both in New Zealand and abroad in developing important public law doctrines. In addition, her scholarship has precipitated significant changes, such as to the parliamentary rules governing the use of urgency, and to government policy concerning the award of New Zealand citizenship in humanitarian cases. She is recognised internationally as a leading expert on the New Zealand constitution, as well as on the constitutional protection of human rights in the Anglo-Commonwealth."

== Selected works ==
- Seeing the world whole : essays in honour of Sir Kenneth Keith (ed. with Dean Robert Knight, Victoria University Press, 2008)
- What's the hurry? : urgency in the New Zealand legislative process 1987-2010 (with Elizabeth McLeay and Polly Higbee, Victoria University Press, 2011)
- The Dead Hand of the Bill of Rights? : Is the New Zealand Bill of Rights Act 1990 a Substantive Legal Constraint on Parliament's Power to Legislate?, Otago Law Review, 2005
- On a Road to Nowhere : Implied Declarations of Inconsistency and the New Zealand Bill of Rights Act, Victoria University of Wellington Law Review, 2009
- Historical background to the Muriwhenua Land Claim, 1865–1950, Report for the Waitangi Tribunal, 1992
