= Ian Brooks =

New Zealand politician (1928–2022)

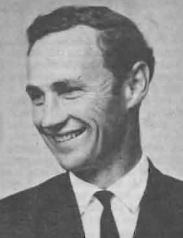

Member of the New Zealand Parliament for Marlborough
- In office 21 February 1970 – 29 November 1975
- Preceded by: Tom Shand
- Succeeded by: Ed Latter

Personal details
- Born: 21 April 1928 Blenheim, New Zealand
- Died: 20 April 2022 (aged 93) Blenheim, New Zealand
- Party: Labour
- Spouse: Lowis Terrill (m. 1954; died 2016)
- Children: 4
- Profession: Clerk

Ian James Brooks (21 April 1928 – 20 April 2022) was a New Zealand politician of the Labour Party.

== Early life and career ==
Brooks was born in Blenheim on 21 April 1928, the son of Ernest Brooks, and was educated at Marlborough College. He worked in the grocery trade for eight years and was then a senior clerk at the New Zealand Post Office for twenty years. He was a part-time farmer, and his 1940s Allis-Chalmers model C tractor is on display at Marlborough Museum.

In 1954, he married Lowis Rita Terrill, the daughter of Leonard Terrill. They had two sons and two daughters.

== Political career ==
New Zealand Parliament
Years	Term	Electorate	Party
1970–1972	36th	Marlborough	Labour
1972–1975	37th	Marlborough	Labour

Brooks unsuccessfully contested the Marlborough electorate in the 1969 election, but he was beaten by the incumbent, Tom Shand of the National Party. After Shand's death only days after the general election, Brooks had a decisive win against Shand's son in the resulting by-election in February 1970 turning a 2500 vote loss from three months earlier into an 1100 vote winning margin. The Police once urged him to cancel an electorate meeting in Hanmer Springs as they had received a death threat against him over his opposition to the Vietnam War. He held the Marlborough electorate until he was defeated in 1975 by National's Ed Latter for what was usually a safe National seat.

He stood once more in the Marlborough electorate in the 1978 election but was narrowly defeated by National's Doug Kidd.

== Life after politics ==
In his spare time, Brooks grew bulbs. His parents were in The Salvation Army and Brooks joined them as a child, and remained an active member in Blenheim, playing the bass saxhorn in the Salvation Army band. Brooks was widowed by the death of his wife, Lowis, in 2016. He died on 20 April 2022 at Wairau Hospital in Blenheim, the day before his 94th birthday.

New Zealand Parliament
Preceded by Tom Shand	Member of Parliament for Marlborough; 1970–1975	Succeeded by Ed Latter
