= Martha Geiringer =

Austrian zoologist, biologist and activist

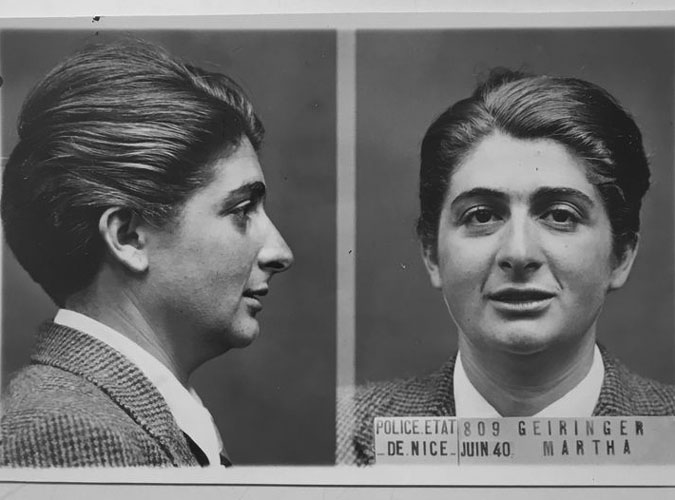
Photograph taken by Nice police in June 1940 for crossing from Italy into France illegally.

Martha Geiringer (28 August 1912 – c. 18 January 1943) was an Austrian biologist who worked at the Biological Research Institute in Vienna from 1935 to 1938. She was forced to leave due to being Jewish during the Anschluss, the German invasion of Austria. She was executed in the Auschwitz-Birkenau concentration camp.

== Early life and education ==
Geiringer was born in Vienna to Wilhelm (1881–1930) who owned a coffee house and was a distant cousin of Gustav Mahler, and his wife Irma, née Körner (1885–1957). She studied biology and sociology at the University of Vienna from 1931. In 1935, she worked on her doctoral research under Hans Przibram at the Biologische Versuchsanstalt (BVA) in the Vienna Academy of Sciences. The BVA had been founded in 1902 to work on developmental and theoretical biology including biophysics and biochemistry.

== Career ==
Geiringer was conducting experimental studies on the metamorphosis of Bufo vulgaris and examining the role of hormones. She had examined the role of adrenaline as a synergist of thyroxin. She was forced to leave on account of her Jewish origins after Nazi Germany annexed Austria in March 1938.

== Escape ==
Along with her sister Gertrude (later Gertrude Adler), who was also a biologist, they escaped to Belgium, and she tried to work at the University of Ghent with support from professor Alfred De Waele. Her passport was due to expire in February 1939 and would not be extended by the German government. Her sister emigrated to England with assistance from their brothers Alfred (1911–1996), who worked in the Reuters news agency, and Erich (1917–1995), who became a physician. Martha refused to move to England and stayed in Ghent with resistance member and physician Yvonne Fontaine. Fontaine and Geiringer were in a relationship.

Geiringer then was assisted to make a trip to the Philippines, where she considered having a marriage of convenience with a Viennese exile. This failed, and she returned to Genoa on 6 April 1940, hoping to make her way back to Belgium. The consulate in Milan, however, refused as she was not a refugee. Just before Mussolini declared war on France, she reached Nice illegally and was detained. She returned to Ghent with assistance from Fontaine.

== Arrest and detention ==
Fontaine had in the meantime filed for divorce from her former husband Andreas Claessens who was a Nazi sympathizer. He may have reported them to the Nazi authorities who had taken over Belgium in May 1940. On June 8, 1941, she was forced to register as an "Alien" in Ghent and she was arrested several times between 1941 and 1942 (once for not wearing the star to identify as a Jew). She was interned at Caserne Dossin and deported to Auschwitz on January 15, 1943, and reached the camp on the 18th. The date of her execution is unknown.

== Legacy ==
In May 2005 pianist and composer Frederick Adler, the son of her sister Gertrude, dedicated a string quartet in the memory of Martha Geiringer and premiered in Ghent. A stolperstein was installed in Ghent in 2022.
