= George Chapman (party president) =

New Zealand politician (born 1927)

Sir George Chapman
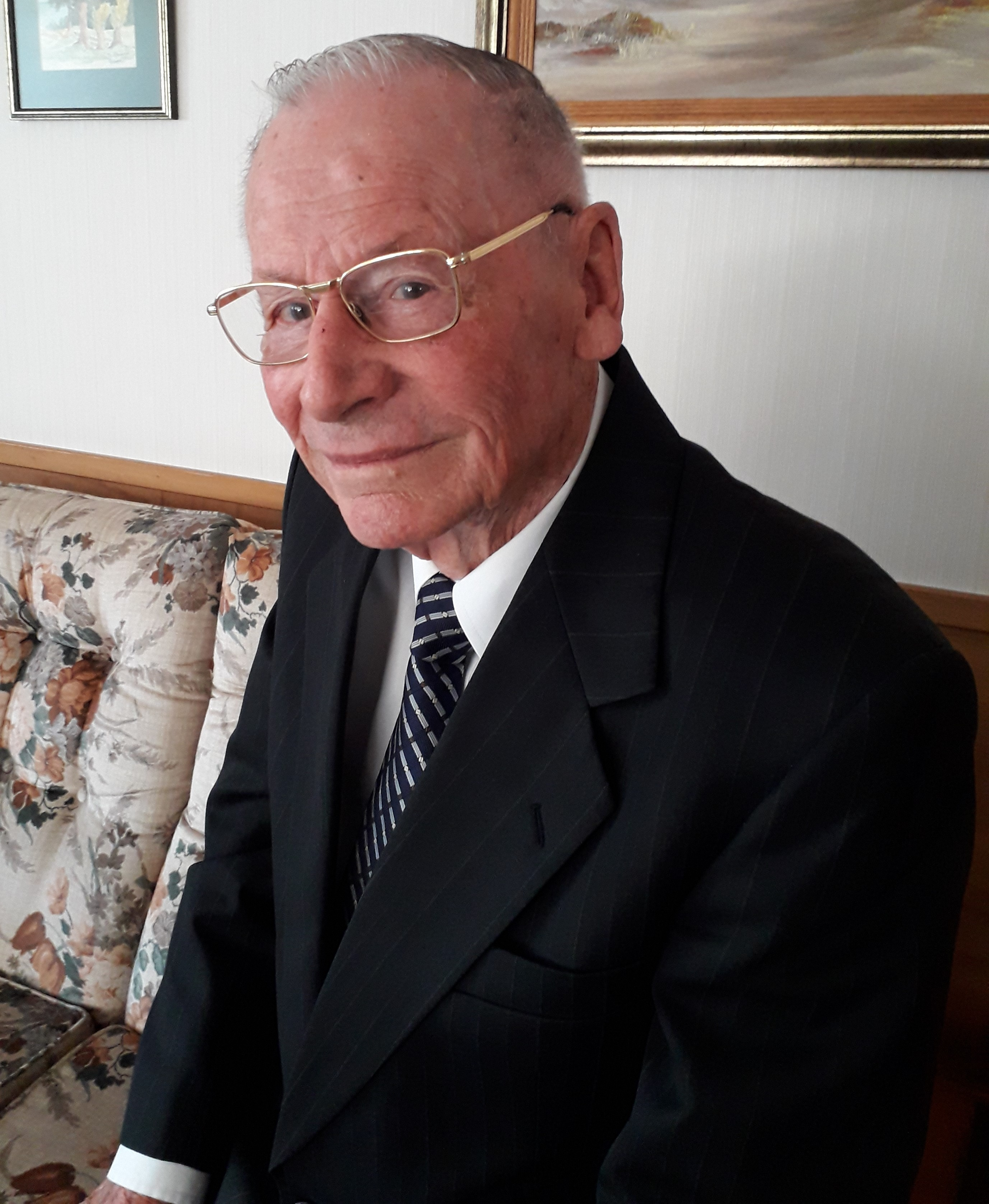
- Chapman in 2019

8th President of the National Party
- In office 1973–1982
- Preceded by: Ned Holt
- Succeeded by: Sue Wood

9th Deputy Mayor of Upper Hutt
- In office 1953–1955
- Preceded by: John Purvis
- Succeeded by: F.P. Keys

Personal details
- Born: George Alan Chapman; 13 April 1927 (age 99) Trentham Military Camp, New Zealand
- Party: National

Sir George Alan Chapman (born 13 April 1927) is a New Zealand accountant, businessman and company director. He was president of the National Party from 1973 to 1982.

== Early life ==
Chapman was born on 13 April 1927 in the Trentham Military Camp, Trentham, where his ex-British Army father was chief armourer. His parents were Thomas "Tom" George Chapman and Winifred "Wyn" Jordan Chapman. He was educated at Trentham Primary School, Hutt Valley High School and Victoria University of Wellington.

== Political career ==
Chapman joined the National Party in 1948, and was chairman of the Young Nationals for two years, electorate secretary (1953–58) and chairman (1960–66) of Heretaunga, Wellington Division chairman (1966–73), Dominion Councillor (1964–85), and was party vice-president between 1966 and 1973. In 1971, he challenged the incumbent, Ned Holt, for the presidency of the National Party but lost the vote. He was elected president of the National Party in 1973 and held that role until 1982, and was described as "one of the National Party's most influential presidents" by political historian Barry Gustafson.

He was an Upper Hutt borough councillor from 1952 to 1955 and served as deputy mayor between 1953 and 1955.

In 1977, Chapman was awarded the Queen Elizabeth II Silver Jubilee Medal, and in the 1982 Queen's Birthday Honours he was appointed a Knight Bachelor, for political and public services.

His memoir The Years of Lightning covers several noteworthy general events; the 1969 election, 1972 election, 1975 election, 1978 election, and the period with Robert Muldoon as party leader.

== Commercial career ==
In 1948 when aged 20, he became the borough treasurer for Upper Hutt. Later in the same year, he became a partner in an accountancy firm that was later called Saunders and Chapman and then became Chapman Upchurch. He retired as senior partner in 2000.

Chapman has, since 1948, been a member of the New Zealand Society of Accountants (MNZSA) and was made a fellow (FCA) in 1969. He is a fellow of the Chartered Institute of Secretaries & Administrators (FCIS) and a member of the New Zealand Institute of Directors. He was chairman of the Upper Hutt Chamber of Commerce.

He was chairman of the Housing Corporation (1992–95) and chaired the Housing New Zealand Establishment Board (April–July 1992). He was chairman of the Building Industry Authority (1992–2000). When the Minister of Internal Affairs, George Hawkins, accused him of having known about the leaky building problem, Chapman denied any knowledge and stated that the board was first informed in August 2001, i.e. after his tenure.

Chapman was a director for several companies including the Bank of New Zealand (1968–86, including deputy chairman 1976–86), BNZ Finance (1977–88), Maui Developments Ltd 1979–85, Skellerup Industries Ltd (1982–90), Pilkington (NZ) (1982–94), Norwich Union (NZ) (formerly Norwich Winterthur NZ; 1982–1992), and State Insurance Ltd (1990–1992).

He was board chairman of Pilkington (NZ) (1989–94), BNZ Finance 1979–88, Mitel Telecommunications (NZ) (1984–91), and Norwich Union (NZ) (1982–85).

== Personal life ==
Chapman married Jacqueline Sidney Irvine (born 1928) in 1950; she was the daughter of Murray Russell Irvine. They had two sons and five daughters. His wife died in 2009.

== Notes ==
Party political offices
Preceded by Ned Holt	President of the National Party; 1973–1982	Succeeded by Sue Wood
