= Bruce McLeod (politician) =

New Zealand politician (1890–1966)

Bruce McLeod (3 August 1890 – 6 February 1966) was a member of the suicide squad in 1950 appointed to vote for the abolition of the New Zealand Legislative Council.

== Early life ==
McLeod was born on 3 August 1890 in Foxton, New Zealand. He received his education in Makomako (near Aotea Harbour) and Pahiatua.

== Military ==
McLeod was part of the New Zealand Rifle Brigade during World War I. Becoming a major, he rose to second in command, and received a Military Cross for action in France. He lost an arm in the war. He joined the Royal New Zealand Returned and Services' Association in 1927,

== Farming ==
After the war, McLeod farmed sheep at Colyton near Feilding. He retired from farming in 1964.

== Politics ==
McLeod joined the National Party in 1936, the year the party was formed. Since 1946, he was the chairman of the Manawatu executive. He was appointed a member of the New Zealand Legislative Council on 22 June 1950 as part of the suicide squad nominated by the First National Government in 1950 to vote for the abolition of the Council. Most of the new members (like McLeod) were appointed on 22 June 1950, and served until 31 December 1950 when the Council was abolished. In 1953, he was awarded the Queen Elizabeth II Coronation Medal.

== Family and death ==
On 4 April 1928, Margaret Falconer and McLeod married at St Paul's Presbyterian Church in Pahiatua. They were to have three sons. McLeod died on 6 February 1966.
