= Erich Geiringer =

New Zealand activist

- Born: 31 January 1917; Vienna, Austria-Hungary (now Austria)
- Died: 24 August 1995 (aged 78); New Zealand
- Occupation: Medical education
- Known for: Founder of the New Zealand Medical Association, anti-nuclear and abortion rights advocacy
- Spouse: Carol Shand
- Children: Claudia Geiringer, Felix Geiringer
- Relatives: Tom Shand (father-in-law)

Erich Geiringer (31 January 1917 – 24 August 1995) was a New Zealand writer, publisher, broadcaster, Fulbright scholar 1953, a leading member of International Physicians for the Prevention of Nuclear War (IPPNW), and the founder of the New Zealand Medical Association. George Salmond described him in a memorial tribute as, 'one of the most significant public health figures in New Zealand in the last half century'.

Born in Vienna, Austria-Hungary in 1917, Geiringer escaped Nazi Germany in 1938, going first to Belgium and later the United Kingdom, attending medical school in Edinburgh and Glasgow. He gained a PhD in adreno-cortal transplantation from the University of Edinburgh in 1954. In New Zealand he became a researcher at Otago Medical School in the 1960s. In the same period his pamphlets on advocating cervical smears were banned by a university for, 'being obscene'. According to The Independent he dragged New Zealand medicine into the modern world. He was the founder of the New Zealand Medical Association. Geiringer held a radical stance in the abortion rights lobby, campaigning in the early 1970s for solidarity with jailed abortion providers.

Geiringer was the author of a book on nuclear disarmament entitled Malice in Blunderland. He was instrumental in the IPPNW's campaign in seeking an advisory opinion from the International Court of Justice questioning the legality of nuclear weapons. He died the same year in which the IPPNW managed to gain a hearing at the International Court of Justice.

Geiringer was accused of raping a young female patient during a gynecological exam in 1976, the case was thrown out by the court. In 2014, conservative politician Deborah Coddington wrote that she recalls she was required to undergo a gynaecological inspection by Geiringer to be prescribed the contraceptive pill, which she said made her 'ashamed'. 30 years later she discovered that several of her colleagues shared similar concerns with his conduct as a doctor.

Erich Geiringer died in Wellington on 24 August 1995, and is survived by his wife Dr Carol Shand (the daughter of Tom Shand), his daughter Claudia and his sons Karl and Felix.
