= Suicide squad (New Zealand) =

Legislative Councillors appointed to end the body in 1950

- A group of legislators, part of the New Zealand Legislative Council, appointed to abolish the New Zealand Legislative Council
- Formation: 22 June 1950
- Dissolved: 1 December 1950
- Purpose: Abolish the upper house, in other words, vote itself out of existence
- Location: New Zealand
- Key people: Sidney Holland
- Parent organization: New Zealand Legislative Council

The "suicide squad" was the group of New Zealand Legislative Councillors appointed in 1950 by Prime Minister Sidney Holland tasked with voting the New Zealand Legislative Council out of existence. The Legislative Council was a body appointed by the Prime Minister since the colonial days, and by the 1940s it was seen as ineffectual and obsolete. However, its abolition would involve a complex constitutional process, so Holland appointed new councillors with the task to draft the laws that would eventually dissolve the body, hence the nickname. On 1 December 1950, the Legislative Council met for the last time, and by a majority of ten voted itself out of existence; the Council was formally abolished on 1 January 1951.

External image
- Final gathering of the Legislative Council, 1 December 1950

== Abolition of the Upper House ==
By the mid-20th century, the New Zealand Legislative Council was increasingly being looked on as ineffectual and making little difference to the legislative process, as it rarely criticised bills sent to it by the House. Many believed that it was now obsolete, with some favouring its reform, and others favouring its abolition.

The leader of the National Party, Sidney Holland, introduced a private member's bill to abolish it in 1947. However, the Parliament of New Zealand was unable to amend the New Zealand Constitution Act 1852 because it was an Act of the United Kingdom Parliament, meaning the New Zealand Parliament was barred from amending the parts of the Act dealing with the establishment of the Legislative Council.

Therefore, it had to adopt the Statute of Westminster 1931, which it did with the Statute of Westminster Adoption Act 1947. Following the adoption of the Act, the Parliament of New Zealand passed the New Zealand Constitution Amendment (Request and Consent) Act 1947, and the Parliament of the United Kingdom passed the New Zealand Constitution (Amendment) Act 1947, which allowed the New Zealand Parliament to amend the Constitution Act and abolish the Legislative Council.

However, the Labour government did not actually enact the abolition itself, losing office in the 1949 general election. National formed the new government under Sidney Holland, and a key aide to Holland was Clifton Webb, who was appointed to Attorney-General. As Minister of Justice, Webb was responsible for drafting the legislation, the Legislative Council Abolition Act, that would result in the abolition of the Legislative Council. Even before Holland started appointing new members, the opposition termed the incoming legislative councillors the "suicide squad" in April 1950.

With nineteen of the existing twenty-five members of the council known to be opposed to the bill, Holland appointed twenty-five new members on 22 June 1950, known as the suicide squad, to vote themselves out of existence, the same method the Australian state of Queensland had used to abolish its upper house in 1922.

Four more members were appointed on 27 July 1950, and to encourage co-operation from the remaining members, Holland promised to use the money saved through abolition to set up a fund for retired members, and a Statutes Revision Committee (now defunct) was established to carry out some of the scrutiny that the Legislative Council had been intended for.

On 1 December 1950, the Legislative Council met for the last time, and by a majority of ten voted itself out of existence. The Council was formally abolished on 1 January 1951.

While abolition was intended as an interim measure, Parliament has remained unicameral ever since. Until recently, no serious attempts were ever made to introduce a new second chamber. In recent election campaigns The Opportunities Party, a minor centrist party known for supporting capital gains tax and universal basic income, has proposed to re-introduce an upper house as part of their governance policy but it has now been dropped from their priorities.

== Members of the suicide squad ==
Most members were appointed on 22 June 1950, although William Polson was appointed 15 March 1950 and Allen, Bell, Croker, and Marumaru were appointed 27 July 1950. Thomas Otto Bishop was first appointed on 9 March 1943 and after the expiry of his seven-year term, was reappointed on 15 March 1950; he was thus not part of the intake of new members. All their terms lasted to 31 December 1950.

- Andrew Allen (1877–1963)
- John Southgate Allen (1883–1955) appointed 27 July 1950
- Allen Alexander (1904–1968)
- Cheviot Bell (1892–1963) appointed 27 July 1950
- Cora Louisa Burrell Mrs (1889–1962)
- Allan Cockerell (1891–1975)
- Cyril Croker (1888–1958) appointed 27 July 1950
- Harold Dickie (1874–1954)
- Bill Endean (1884–1957)
- John Finlayson (1890–1960)
- William Girling (1882–1973)
- Ethel Gould Mrs (1895–1992)
- Edwin Hamilton (1885–1964)
- Francis Kelly (1883–1977)
- Henry Livingstone (1890–1959)
- Garnet Mackley (1883–1986)
- Bruce McLeod (1890–1966)
- Robert McMillan (1887–1962)
- Hoeroa Marumaru (1890–1952) appointed 27 July 1950
- Ossie Mazengarb (1890–1963)
- David Murdoch (1887–1960)
- Āpirana Ngata (1874–1950), died before taking seat, replaced by Marumaru
- Alex O'Shea (1902–1990)
- Hilcote Pitts-Brown (1905–1990)
- William Polson (1875–1960) appointed 15 March 1950
- Neill Rattray (1896–1964)
- James Frederick Thompson (1884–1966)
- Agnes Weston (1879–1972)
- Charles White (1880–1966)
- William Young (1876–1959)

== See also ==
- List of members of the New Zealand Legislative Council
