= Thomas Shailer Weston Jr. =

New Zealand politician

Thomas Shailer Weston (3 July 1868 – 20 January 1931) was a member of the New Zealand Legislative Council from 17 June 1926 to 20 January 1931, when he committed suicide aged 62 years. He was appointed by the Reform Government.

Weston was born in Auckland on 3 July 1868. His parents were Maria Cracroft Weston (née Hill) and Thomas S. Weston, and judge and later a member of the House of Representatives for electorates on the West Coast of the South Island. Like his younger brother Claude, he was educated at Christ's College and graduated from the Canterbury University College. He graduated with B.A. (1888), M.A. first class honours in political science (1889), and LL.B. (1892).

He was for some time governor of the New Plymouth Boys' High School. He later lived in Wellington.
