= Greg Hegglun =

New Zealand cricketer (born 1984)

Gregory James Tristan Hegglun (born 7 August 1984) is a New Zealand cricketer who plays for Central Districts in the State Shield. Hegglun has also played for Marlborough in the Hawke Cup. He was born in Blenheim.
