= Mary Anderson (New Zealand politician) =

New Zealand politician (1887–1966)

- Born: Mary Patricia Anderson; 17 March 1887; Moonlight
- Died: 18 February 1966 (aged 78); Greymouth
- Political party: New Zealand Labour Party

Mary Patricia Anderson (17 March 1887 – 18 February 1966) was one of the first two women appointed to the New Zealand Legislative Council (upper house).

== Early life ==
Anderson was born in 1887 at Moonlight, a goldmining settlement near Atarau. She was one of eight children of Irish Catherine Flaherty and Swedish miner Anton Anderson. Anderson attended Greymouth District High School.

After graduating high school, Anderson taught at Upper Moonlight School and Granville School from 1902 to 1907, also working as the local postmistress. She and her family moved to Greymouth sometime between 1907 and 1910. During this time, she took an interest in left-wing politics, partially due to the Blackball Coalminer's strike of 1908. In 1910, she opened a boarding house in Puketahi Street, Greymouth, which she managed until 1942.

== Political career ==
During the First World War, Anderson supported the local anti-conscription agitation.

She was a founding member of the Greymouth branch of the New Zealand Labour Party in March 1917. She was elected to its executive committee a year later. She was then secretary of the branch from 1918 to 1956. Anderson was the branch delegate on the Grey District Labour Representation Committee for much of 1919–1959. She managed Greymouth's Lyceum Hall, which housed the Greymouth branch of the Labour Party, the Labour Representation Committee, and many of Greymouth's trade unions.

Anderson was active in welfare organisations including the Plunket society and was appointed a Justice of the Peace in 1943.

With Mary Dreaver she was appointed to the council on 31 January 1946 by the First Labour Government, after a law change in 1941 to make women eligible to serve on the council. They served to the end of 1950, when the Legislative Council was abolished by the First National Government. In 1948, she became the first woman to chair a New Zealand parliamentary committee.

Anderson strongly supported Labour's welfare state. In 1950, she sat out a parliamentary committee to consider the reintroduction of capital punishment, describing the practice as "barbarous".

== Life after politics ==
In 1950 she was elected to the Grey Hospital Board. She served on the Board for 12 years.

In 1956 she retired as secretary-treasurer of the Greymouth branch of the Labour Party, but remained an honorary vice president well into the 1960s.

She died at Greymouth in 1966; she had never married.
