= Marlborough (New Zealand electorate) =

Marlborough is a former New Zealand parliamentary electorate, in the Marlborough region at the top of the South Island. It existed from 1938 to 1996, and was represented by five Members of Parliament.

== Population centres ==
The 1931 New Zealand census had been cancelled due to the Great Depression, so the 1937 electoral redistribution had to take ten years of population growth into account. The increasing population imbalance between the North and South Islands had slowed, and only one electorate seat was transferred from south to north. Five electorates were abolished, one former electorate (Onehunga) was re-established, and four electorates were created for the first time, including Marlborough. The Marlborough electorate replaced the Wairau electorate, which had more or less the same shape as Wairau had had since the 1927 electoral redistribution. For the purposes of the country quota, the 1936 census had determined that some 27% of the population lived in urban areas, and the balance in rural areas.

Settlements that were covered by the original electorate included Havelock, Picton, Blenheim, and Kaikōura. The area is noted for growing grapes for white wine.

== History ==
The electorate was created in 1938, replacing the Wairau electorate. Ted Meachen of the Labour Party, who had previously represented Wairau, was the first representative. In the 1946 election, Meachen was defeated by National's Tom Shand.

In 1996 with the advent of mixed-member proportional (MMP) representation the electorate was included into the Kaikōura electorate. The then MP Doug Kidd was the first MP for Kaikōura.

=== Members of Parliament ===
Key

Labour National

Election	Winner
1938 election	Ted Meachen
1943 election	Ted Meachen
1946 election	Tom Shand
1949 election	Tom Shand
1951 election	Tom Shand
1954 election	Tom Shand
1957 election	Tom Shand
1960 election	Tom Shand
1963 election	Tom Shand
1966 election	Tom Shand
1969 election	Tom Shand
1970 by-election	Ian Brooks
1972 election	Ian Brooks
1975 election	Ed Latter
1978 election	Doug Kidd
1981 election	Doug Kidd
1984 election	Doug Kidd
1987 election	Doug Kidd
1990 election	Doug Kidd
1993 election	Doug Kidd
(Electorate abolished in 1996; see Kaikōura)

== Election results ==
=== 1993 election ===
1993 general election: Marlborough
Party	Candidate	Votes	%	±%
National	Doug Kidd	8,935	41.04	−22.34
Labour	Stephen Howard	6,387	29.33	
Alliance	Reg Murphy	3,891	17.87	
NZ First	Tom Harrison	1,930	8.86	
Christian Heritage	David Pigou	485	2.22	
Independent	Desmond Bell	91	0.41	−0.35
Natural Law	Kevin Smith	50	0.22	
Majority		2,548	11.70	−23.76
Turnout		21,769	83.77	+1.03
Registered electors		25,984		

=== 1990 election ===
1990 general election: Marlborough
Party	Candidate	Votes	%	±%
National	Doug Kidd	12,844	63.38	+9.67
Labour	Barbara Hutchinson	5,657	27.91	−14.27
NewLabour	Karen Donaldson	901	4.44	
Social Credit	George Kerr	425	2.09	
NZ Party	Michael Heywood	180	0.88	
Independent	Desmond Bell	155	0.76	+0.27
Democrats	Hugh Emslie	102	0.50	
Majority		7,187	35.46	+23.93
Turnout		20,264	82.74	−8.08
Registered electors		24,489		

=== 1987 election ===
1987 general election: Marlborough
Party	Candidate	Votes	%	±%
National	Doug Kidd	11,189	53.71	+11.01
Labour	Barbara Hutchinson	8,787	42.18	
Democrats	Ross MacArthur	650	3.12	
Independent	Desmond Bell	109	0.52	+0.33
Independent	Stephen Yealands	97	0.46	+0.07
Majority		2,402	11.53	+8.78
Turnout		20,832	90.82	−3.20
Registered electors		22,937		

=== 1984 election ===
1984 general election: Marlborough
Party	Candidate	Votes	%	±%
National	Doug Kidd	9,472	42.70	−0.61
Labour	George MacDonald	8,860	39.94	
NZ Party	Peter Calcott	2,656	11.97	
Social Credit	Heather Smith	1,062	4.78	
Independent	Stephen Yealands	87	0.39	
Independent	Desmond Bell	43	0.19	−0.12
Majority		612	2.75	−5.15
Turnout		22,180	94.02	+1.88
Registered electors		23,590		

=== 1981 election ===
1981 general election: Marlborough
Party	Candidate	Votes	%	±%
National	Doug Kidd	8,998	43.31	−0.37
Labour	Graeme Macann	7,355	35.40	
Social Credit	Ron Cullum	4,353	20.95	
Independent	Desmond Bell	66	0.31	−0.02
Majority		1,643	7.90	+6.27
Turnout		20,772	92.14	+12.98
Registered electors		22,543		

=== 1978 election ===
1978 general election: Marlborough
Party	Candidate	Votes	%	±%
National	Doug Kidd	8,614	43.68	
Labour	Ian Brooks	8,291	42.05	+4.26
Social Credit	George Kerr	2,365	11.99	+7.01
Values	Ailsa Litchfield	381	1.93	
Independent	Desmond Bell	66	0.33	
Majority		323	1.63	
Turnout		19,717	79.16	−9.77
Registered electors		24,905		

=== 1975 election ===
1975 general election: Marlborough
Party	Candidate	Votes	%	±%
National	Ed Latter	10,047	53.96	
Labour	Ian Brooks	7,037	37.79	−13.66
Social Credit	George Kerr	928	4.98	+0.35
Values	Richard Belton	607	3.26	
Majority		3,010	16.16	
Turnout		18,619	88.93	−3.04
Registered electors		20,936		

=== 1972 election ===
1972 general election: Marlborough
Party	Candidate	Votes	%	±%
Labour	Ian Brooks	8,469	51.45	+3.52
National	Bruno Dalliessi	7,179	43.61	
Social Credit	George Kerr	763	4.63	−3.32
New Democratic	Thomas William MacDonald	49	0.29	
Majority		1,290	7.83	+0.75
Turnout		16,460	91.97	+13.66
Registered electors		17,896		

=== 1970 by-election ===
1970 Marlborough by-election
Party	Candidate	Votes	%	±%
Labour	Ian Brooks	7,060	47.93	+9.29
National	Andy Shand	6,017	40.85	
Social Credit	George Kerr	1,171	7.95	−0.29
Country Party	Clifford Stanley Emeny	482	3.27	
Majority		1,043	7.08	
Turnout		14,730	78.31	−13.33
Registered electors		18,809		

=== 1969 election ===
1969 general election: Marlborough
Party	Candidate	Votes	%	±%
National	Tom Shand	9,039	53.10	+6.98
Labour	Ian Brooks	6,579	38.64	
Social Credit	George Kerr	1,404	8.24	−4.18
Majority		2,460	14.45	+9.78
Turnout		17,022	91.64	+1.88
Registered electors		18,573		

=== 1966 election ===
1966 general election: Marlborough
Party	Candidate	Votes	%	±%
National	Tom Shand	7,216	46.12	−4.13
Labour	Gerry Wall	6,484	41.44	
Social Credit	George Kerr	1,943	12.42	−0.91
Majority		732	4.67	−9.17
Turnout		15,643	89.76	−1.45
Registered electors		17,427		

=== 1963 election ===
1963 general election: Marlborough
Party	Candidate	Votes	%	±%
National	Tom Shand	7,663	50.25	+0.03
Labour	Bill Kenyon	5,552	36.41	
Social Credit	George Kerr	2,033	13.33	+1.97
Majority		2,111	13.84	+2.83
Turnout		15,248	91.21	
Registered electors		16,716		

=== 1960 election ===
1960 general election: Marlborough
Party	Candidate	Votes	%	±%
National	Tom Shand	7,424	50.22	−1.80
Labour	Robert William Hope	5,677	38.40	
Social Credit	George Kerr	1,680	11.36	+3.34
Majority		1,747	11.81	−0.27
Turnout		14,781	92.56	−2.11
Registered electors		15,969		

=== 1957 election ===
1957 general election: Marlborough
Party	Candidate	Votes	%	±%
National	Tom Shand	7,672	52.02	+3.69
Labour	Roy Evans	5,890	39.94	
Social Credit	George Kerr	1,184	8.02	−6.47
Majority		1,782	12.08	+0.92
Turnout		14,746	94.67	+1.58
Registered electors		15,575		

=== 1954 election ===
1954 general election: Marlborough
Party	Candidate	Votes	%	±%
National	Tom Shand	7,080	48.33	−10.49
Labour	George Allan Turner	5,445	37.16	
Social Credit	George Kerr	2,124	14.49	
Majority		1,635	11.16	−6.48
Turnout		14,649	93.09	+0.42
Registered electors		15,735		

=== 1951 election ===
1951 general election: Marlborough
Party	Candidate	Votes	%	±%
National	Tom Shand	8,175	58.82	+2.11
Labour	Ted Meachen	5,723	41.18	
Majority		2,452	17.64	+4.21
Turnout		13,898	92.67	−2.45
Registered electors		14,996		

=== 1949 election ===
1949 general election: Marlborough
Party	Candidate	Votes	%	±%
National	Tom Shand	7,861	56.71	+6.06
Labour	James Harrison Wilson	5,999	43.29	
Majority		1,862	13.43	+12.13
Turnout		13,860	95.12	+0.79
Registered electors		14,571		

=== 1946 election ===
1946 general election: Marlborough
Party	Candidate	Votes	%	±%
National	Tom Shand	6,935	50.65	+5.42
Labour	Ted Meachen	6,756	49.35	−0.41
Majority		179	1.30	
Turnout		13,691	94.33	+2.17
Registered electors		14,513		

=== 1943 election ===
1943 general election: Marlborough
Party	Candidate	Votes	%	±%
Labour	Ted Meachen	5,934	48.94	−7.23
National	Tom Shand	5,484	45.23	
Democratic Labour	Mark Walton Grace	564	4.65	
Ind. Conservative	Angus Mackinnon	52	0.42	
Informal votes		90	0.74	−0.07
Majority		450	3.71	−9.31
Turnout		12,124	92.16	−3.58
Registered electors		13,154		

=== 1938 election ===
1938 general election: Marlborough
Party	Candidate	Votes	%	±%
Labour	Ted Meachen	6,579	56.17	
National	Edward Healy	5,054	43.15	
Informal votes		79	0.67	
Majority		1,525	13.02	
Turnout		11,712	95.74	
Registered electors		12,232		
