= Ngata =

Ngata is a Māori surname, most commonly found among members of the Ngāti Porou iwi. The name is also occasionally found in Tonga, where it was the name of a 17th-century leader, the first Tu'i Kanokupolu.

== Notable people with the surname include ==
- Āpirana Ngata (1874–1950), New Zealand politician and lawyer
- Arihia Ngata (1879–1829), New Zealand community leader, wife of Āpirana
- Haloti Ngata (born 1984), American football player
- Heremaia Ngata (born 1971), New Zealand association footballer
- Hēnare Ngata (1917–2011), Māori leader and son of Āpirana and Arihia
- Hōri Ngata (1919–1989), New Zealand lexicographer, grandson of Āpirana and Arihia
- Joseph Ngata (born 2001), American football player
- Linda Ngata (Ngāti Porou), a community leader in Christchurch
- Paratene Ngata (c. 1849–1924), New Zealand tribal leader, farmer, and soldier
- Whai Ngata (c. 1942–2016), New Zealand broadcaster, journalist, and lexicographer, son of Hōri

As a given name, Ngata may refer to:

- Ngata Prosser Pitcaithly (1906–1991), New Zealand principal and educator

== See also ==
- Nagata
