= Akuaku =

Akuaku Aku Aku
- Village (abandoned)
- Motto: Ko Tokatea te maunga; Ko Kiekie te awa; Ko Te Whānau-a-Rākairoa te hapū; Tihe mauri ora!
- Location of Akuaku in New Zealand's North Island
- Coordinates: 37°59′12″S 178°21′32″E
- Country: New Zealand
- Region: Gisborne Region
- Ward: Waiapu Ward
- Abandoned: c. 1945
- Electorate: East Coast

Population
  - Total: 0
- Time zone: UTC+12 (NZST)
  - Summer (DST): UTC+13 (NZDT)
- Postcode: 4081
- Area code: 06

Akuaku, also known as Aku Aku, was a settlement about halfway between Waipiro Bay and Whareponga in the East Coast region of New Zealand's North Island. A traditional landing point for waka taua, the town is most notable now as the former home (and possible birthplace) of Major Ropata Wahawaha NZC, as well as the ancestral home of Te Whānau-a-Rākairoa.

Akuaku was once a thriving settlement – the hub of the area – with a school, church, and a marae with a wharenui called Rakeiroa. Akuaku never had road access, and when Waipiro Bay's road was built in the early 20th century, Akuaku's residents began to move. The final residents left around 1945. Three cemeteries are all that remain of the town today.

== Pre-European history ==
Akuaku was named by Pāoa, captain of the Horouta waka, around 1350. The name is literally translated as "scraper", or to "scrape out" or "cleanse".

=== Ngāti Ruanuku and Pākānui ===
Akuaku was the site of one of the main Ngāti Ruanuku pā, where the tribe welcomed Pākānui ashore before he eventually killed many of them in a battle at Whareponga called Te Ika-Kōpara-rua (two fish in one net). After observing Ngāti Ruanuku as their guest, Pākānui and his 90 men trapped members of the tribe, including their chief, Rangi-rākai-kura, in nets while they were fishing, before killing them with their patu. This was done for Pākānui's grandmother, Materoa, who wanted the whānau's mana restored after Ngāti Ruanuku killed her father, Poroumātā, a former resident of the area.

Survivors from Ngāti Ruanuku retreated to the Waiapu Valley, where they found refuge among the Wahine-iti people while planning their attack on Pākānui. When Pākānui's scouts informed him Ngāti Ruanuku were returning to Whareponga, he put a plan into action. His warriors were concealed up small streams along the beach in between Whareponga and Akuaku's Mataahu Point, with Pākānui himself stationed at the point (at 37°59′7″S 178°22′4.5″E). His brothers Riki-pāpaki and Raro-taka, who were fast runners, challenged Ngāti Ruanuku at Whareponga, then ran away towards the point. Ngāti Ruanuku chased them, and by the time they reached Pākānui, they were exhausted. At this point Pākānui's warriors emerged from their hiding place, and killed the entire party. There were so many bodies lining the beach after the battle that they formed a barrier for the sea, giving rise to the battle's name Te Tai-timu-roa (The long high-tide). The other name of the battle, Te Poho-wera (The Burnt-breast), refers to the fact that when the bodies of Ngāti Ruanuku were customarily cooked to be eaten, some of the victim's breasts were burnt.

The last members of Ngāti Ruanuku were eventually killed inland up the Tapuaeroa River and at Kāhui-tara (a pā at 37°55′43″S 178°17′15″E). Pākānui settled at Whareponga, building a large house from ponga trees, hence the town's name, which means "ponga house".

=== Te Whānau-a-Rākairoa ===
Māori say the Akuaku area was gifted to Rākairoa's children, Te Haemata and Pona-pātukia – the east given by Takapū-te-rakahia, and the west by Takapu-atua, daughter of Iritekura. Rākairoa is the ancestor of Te Whānau-a-Rākairoa, a hapū of Ngāti Porou that has spread widely from Akuaku. Their distribution is endearingly described as "Ngā wekāhu a Rākairoa", literally, "the sprawling 'couch' grass of Rākairoa". The hapū's proverb of identity is:

Ko Tokatea te maunga; Ko Kiekie te awa; Ko Te Whānau-a-Rākairoa te hapū; Tihe mauri ora!
Tokatea is the mountain; Kiekie is the river; Rākairoa is the sub-tribe; Alas, the breath of life!

Katerina Naki, Sir Āpirana Ngata's mother, was a member of the hapū.

== Major Ropata Wahawaha ==
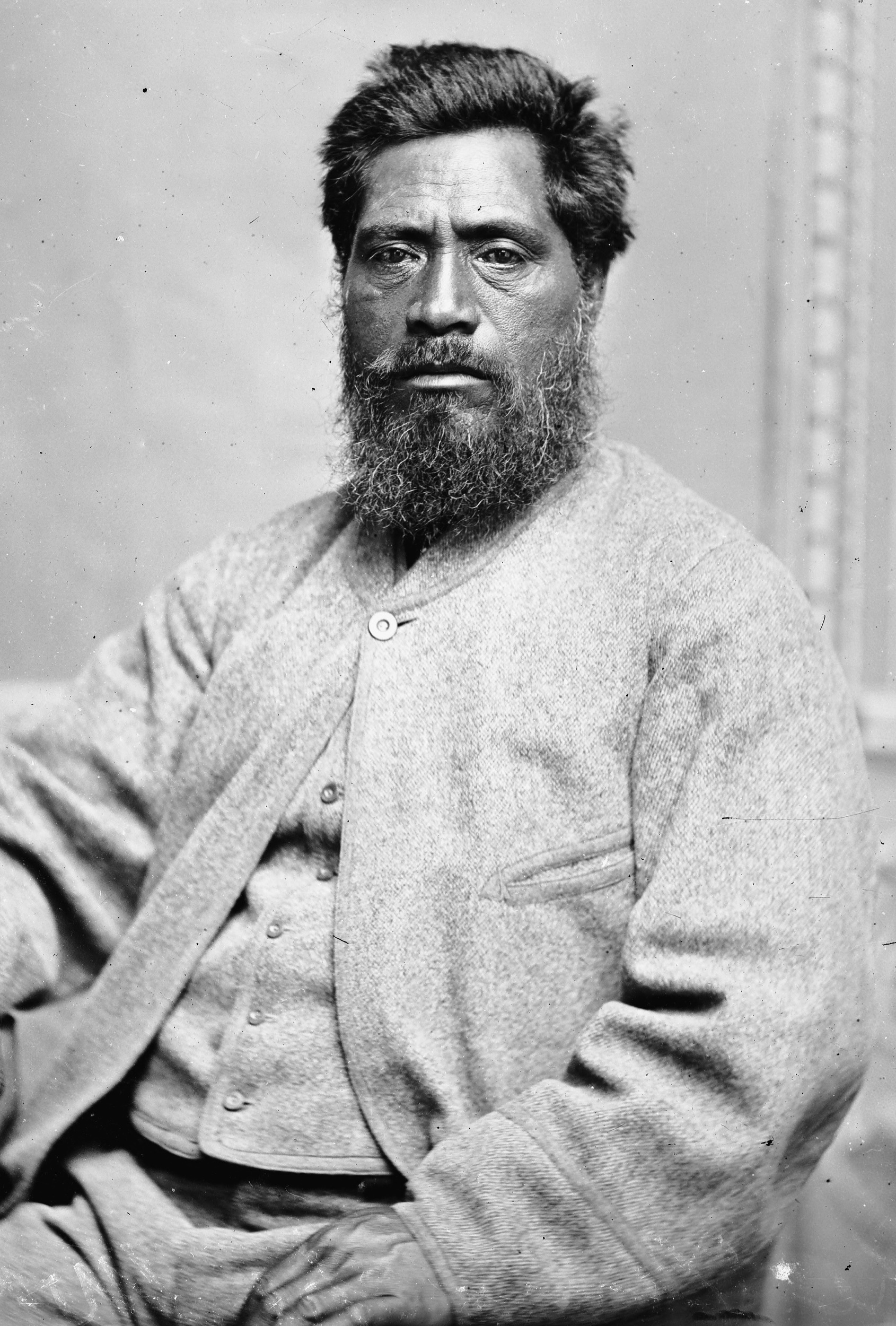
Photo of Major Ropata Wahawaha

Major Ropata Wahawaha was born either at Akuaku or Te Puia Springs, probably around 1820, and was taken as a slave when he was a child. He moved to Akuaku in the early 1870s, and continued to live there until his death in 1897, although another source says he moved to Waiomatatini from Waipiro Bay in 1875 or 1876. Ropata died in Gisborne, and was buried in the Waiomatatini Valley.

=== Te Rākau i Mataahu ===
In 1871, Ropata Wahawaha was presented with a large Union Jack, and a sword of honour from Queen Victoria, for his services in the New Zealand Wars. On 29 July 1872 (or in June 1871), having just returned from a ceremony in his honour in Wellington, Ropata held a hui to raise the flag. He had erected a large flag pole called Te Rākau i Mataahu to fly the flag from on Mataahu Point. The site was chosen because it was a traditional landing point for waka taua (war canoes) after returning from an expedition. The flag would be raised to alert British forces that the people were loyal to the crown, so they would not be fired upon.

The ceremony, held to reaffirm the loyalty of Ngāti Porou and neighbouring tribes to the Crown, was attended by three thousand people, and made Akuaku and Mataahu the centre of huge attention. Attendees swore their allegiance by marching under the flag and taking part in a service led by the Rev. Mohi Tūrei and Ropata himself. All but one who attended swore the oath. The lone abstainer ran away from the flag, and chanted a haka of defiance:

Tieke taretare; tieke taretare; Pō! Tū ana i waho e.
Loosely translated as: Thou ragged Jack, thou tattered Jack; Behold! I stand aloof from thy circle.

Another source quotes the haka as:

Tieke taretare pō tū mai i waho! Tū ana au i waho ma koutou e tangi ki te kuia nei! Kāore au e tangi ki a ia!
Thou ragged Jack, behold I stand outside the circle! I stand outside thy circle and leave you all to lament to this old lady! I will not lament her!

The flagstaff was later moved to a point above the Akuaku marae. In 1960, after Akuaku had been deserted, it was moved again to nearby Kiekie Marae, where it stands today (at 37°59′36.07″S 178°19′4.86″E). Kiekie Marae is also now in possession of Ropata's flag.

=== Church opening and hui ===
Another large hui was held at Akuaku to consecrate the church on 28 May 1884. Ropata, who had been in Gisborne, travelled back to Akuaku on the ship Rosina, which also brought many other prominent guests. Nearly 1,000 Māori attended, as well as many European leaders.

A discussion took place about the sale of Māori land to the New Zealand Native Land Settlement Company, and whether laws and courts were necessary, given the Māori had no intention of selling the land. There were three principal speakers in the discussion. The first, John Sheehan, said that it was not a matter of if, but rather when, the land would be sold, and suggested Māori would get a better deal if they sold the land sooner, while the system was still fair. Wi Pere argued for the formation of committees to oversee ownership and possible sale of the land. Finally, Ropata Wahawaha, who "appeared to have no faith in the Companies or in private people, or in Government or in Parliament, or in laws, or in judges, or in public officials", strongly advised Māori to keep their land, pointing out that the majority of the land north of Akuaku was "as yet comparatively untroubled with European Speculations".

== Akuaku School ==
Akuaku School was opened in March 1874. A year later, while the three other Māori schools in the Waiapu district had achieved only mediocre results due to irregular attendance, Akuaku School was performing well. Its students had regular attendance records, were described as "clean and well dressed", and were well advanced in reading, writing, arithmetic and geography. At the time, the school had at least 50 students, half girls and half boys. The first teachers of the school were Mr. and Mrs. Brown. Ngāti Porou tribal leader and woman of mana Materoa Reedy was a pupil at the school some time between 1888 and 1897.

== Later history and present day ==
Akuaku never had a road built to it, and when a road was built to Waipiro Bay in the early 20th century, Waipiro Bay became the "place to be". Prior to that, Akuaku was larger than Waipiro Bay or Whareponga.

One of the current owners of the land where Akuaku once stood is Paora Kahu Carter, who lived in Akuaku from when she was born in January 1931, until her family moved to Waipiro Bay in 1940. When she was living there, the school and church had already gone, and the town had only six houses left – although Rakeiroa, the town's wharenui, was still in use. The Toheriri family were the last residents of Akuaku, leaving around 1945.

With no one to care for it, the wharenui fell down. Former residents of Akuaku and their descendants now affiliate with nearby Kiekie Marae, where Ropata's flagpole stands today. By 2000, three urupā (cemeteries) were all that remained of Akuaku. Ropata's victim's remains had been recently exhumed and transferred to the entrance of one these cemeteries from their original burial place halfway between Akuaku and the Mataahu point. One of Akuaku's cemeteries was still in use, though difficulty getting to it – and a lack of maintenance – had led it to become an unpopular burial site. The land is currently administered by the Akuaku A3 Trust, has no one living on it, and is classified as having no current use.
