= New Zealand (Māori) Pioneer Battalion =

New Zealand (Maori) Pioneer Battalion
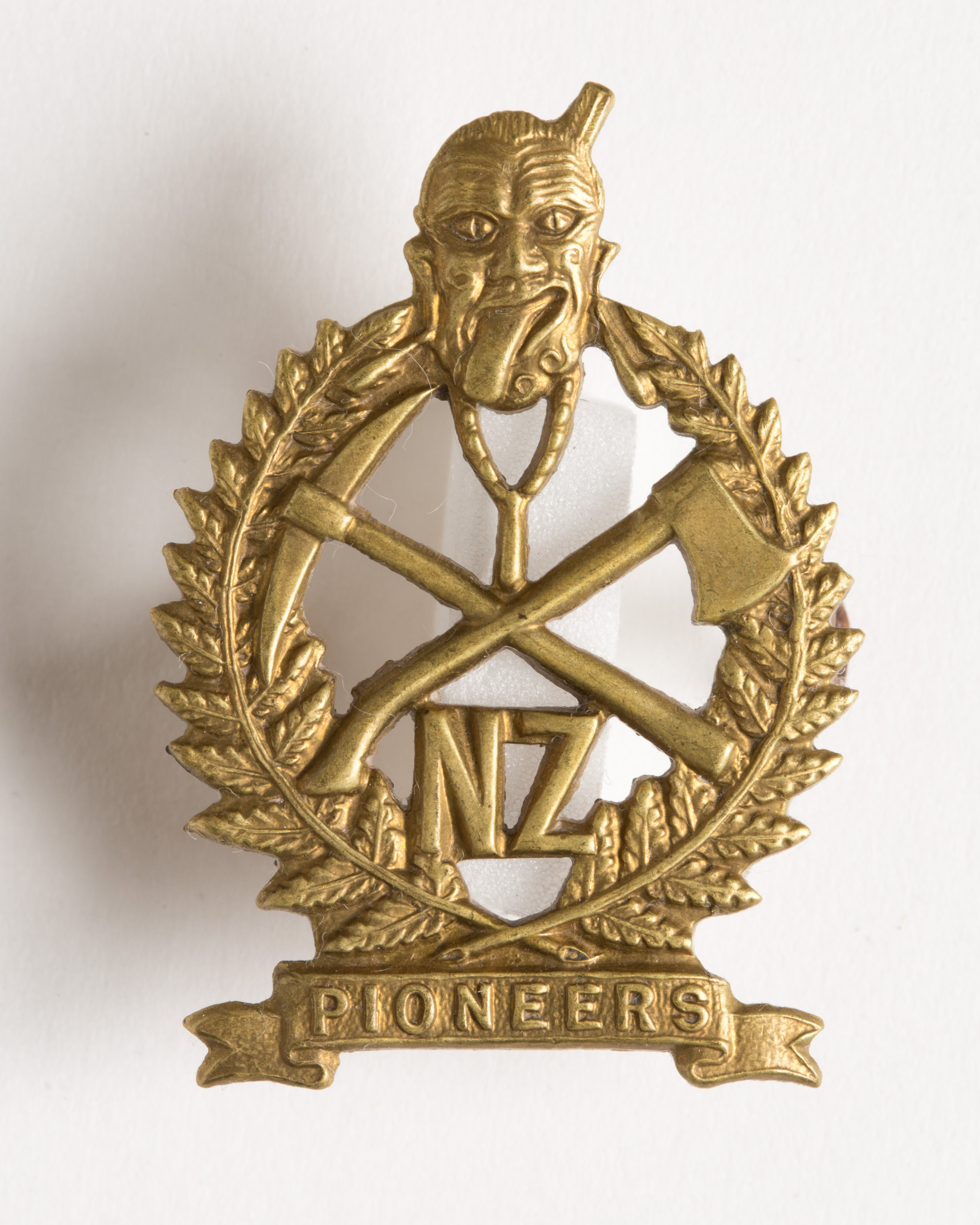
- Cap Badge of the New Zealand Pioneer Battalion, August 1916–
- Active: 1915–1919
- Disbanded: 1919
- Country: New Zealand
- Branch: New Zealand Military Forces
- Type: Pioneers
- Size: ~900 personnel
- Part of: New Zealand Division
- Engagements: First World War: Gallipoli; Western Front

Commanders
- Notable commanders: George Augustus King

The New Zealand Pioneer Battalion (NZPB), later known as the New Zealand (Māori) Pioneer Battalion or New Zealand Māori (Pioneer) Battalion, was a battalion of the New Zealand Expeditionary Force (NZEF) that served during the Great War. The battalion was formed in Egypt in March 1916 upon New Zealand Divisional Orders of 20 February, and drawn from surplus officers and other ranks of the New Zealand Mounted Rifles (NZMR), the Otago Mounted Rifles (OMR) and the New Zealand Native Contingent (NZNC) then serving in Egypt with the New Zealand Infantry Brigade. It consisted of Māori, Pākehā and Pacific Islanders. "By the end of the war, 2227 Maori and 458 Pacific Islanders had served in what became known as the Maori Pioneer Battalion. Of these, 336 died on active service and 734 were wounded. Other Maori enlisted (and died) in other units."

== Origins ==
When the First World War broke out, Māori leaders responded in various ways. Some, such as Rua Kenana Hepetipa, maintained total opposition to Māori enlistment. Others such as Āpirana Ngata, Paraire Tomoana, and Maui Pomare, were in favour of Māori enlistment and organised recruitment drives, particularly in the Waikato region of Ngāti Maniapoto and the East Coast Ngāti Porou region. Their recruitment campaign was particularly successful in Ngāti Porou, which enlisted enough men to form its own company in the battalion. Some companies were also supplemented by recruits from the Cook Islands and Niue.

By 1916, the battalion was in desperate need of reinforcements. As part of the drive to recruit more soldiers, the song Te Ope Tuatahi was composed by Āpirana Ngata. It became famous during the First World War and was adopted as the anthem of the battalion. In 1917, again in need of reinforcements, Paraire Tomoana composed an additional verse to the song, specifically encouraging enlistment in Ngāti Kahungunu, and other eastern regions of the North Island.

After their initial enlistment, recruits were organised into their respective companies and undertook basic training at Narrow Neck camp in Auckland.

== Active service ==
=== Gallipoli campaign ===
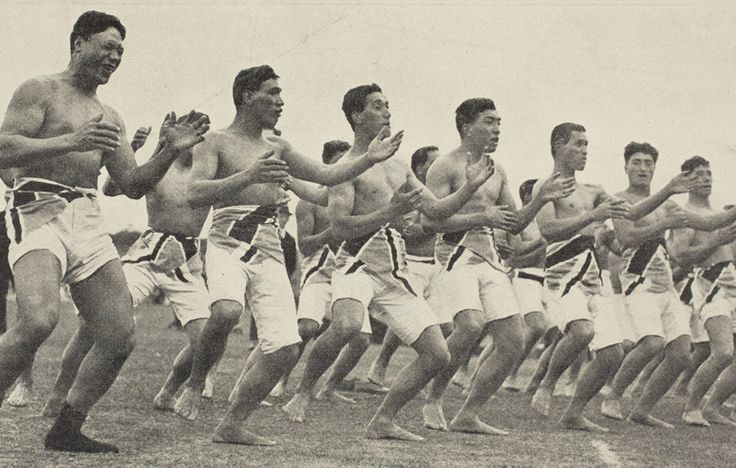
Members of the Māori Contingent perform a haka at Auckland Domain, 1914

The 1st Māori Contingent departed New Zealand in February 1915 aboard the troop ship Warrimoo, arriving in March for further training in Egypt. Despite requests made to Major-General Alexander Godley by New Zealand Minister of Defence James Allen and Māori MPs Āpirana Ngata and Maui Pomare, the battalion was not deployed to Gallipoli with the first invasion force in April 1915. Instead it was kept in reserve and placed on garrison duty on the island of Malta, where further training was undertaken. However, increasing casualties among the Anzac forces at Gallipoli led to the deployment of the 461-man battalion. The battalion arrived at Anzac Cove on 3 July 1915. Here they joined the New Zealand Mounted Rifles and were deployed as infantry soldiers. After Gallipoli there was considerable criticism of three officers of the Māori Pioneers, who were charged with desertion in the face of the enemy, despite strong evidence to the contrary. Godley sent them home and broke up the Māori force when it was sent to France. In France the Māori troops were interspersed with troops from the Otago Mounted Rifles Regiment who were adapted into the pioneer role after suffering many casualties at Gallipoli.

=== Service on the Western Front ===
It was intended that the battalion would be broken up and serve as reinforcement for other New Zealand units on the Western Front. However, after a short time the unit was reunited and served the rest of the war as pioneers digging trenches and drains, doing farm work, laying railway lines, erecting wire entanglements, burying artillery cables and building a cinema called "Kapai Theatre". Much of the time the soldiers were engaged in making support or communication trenches well behind the front lines. When they had to work closer to the front they usually worked at night.

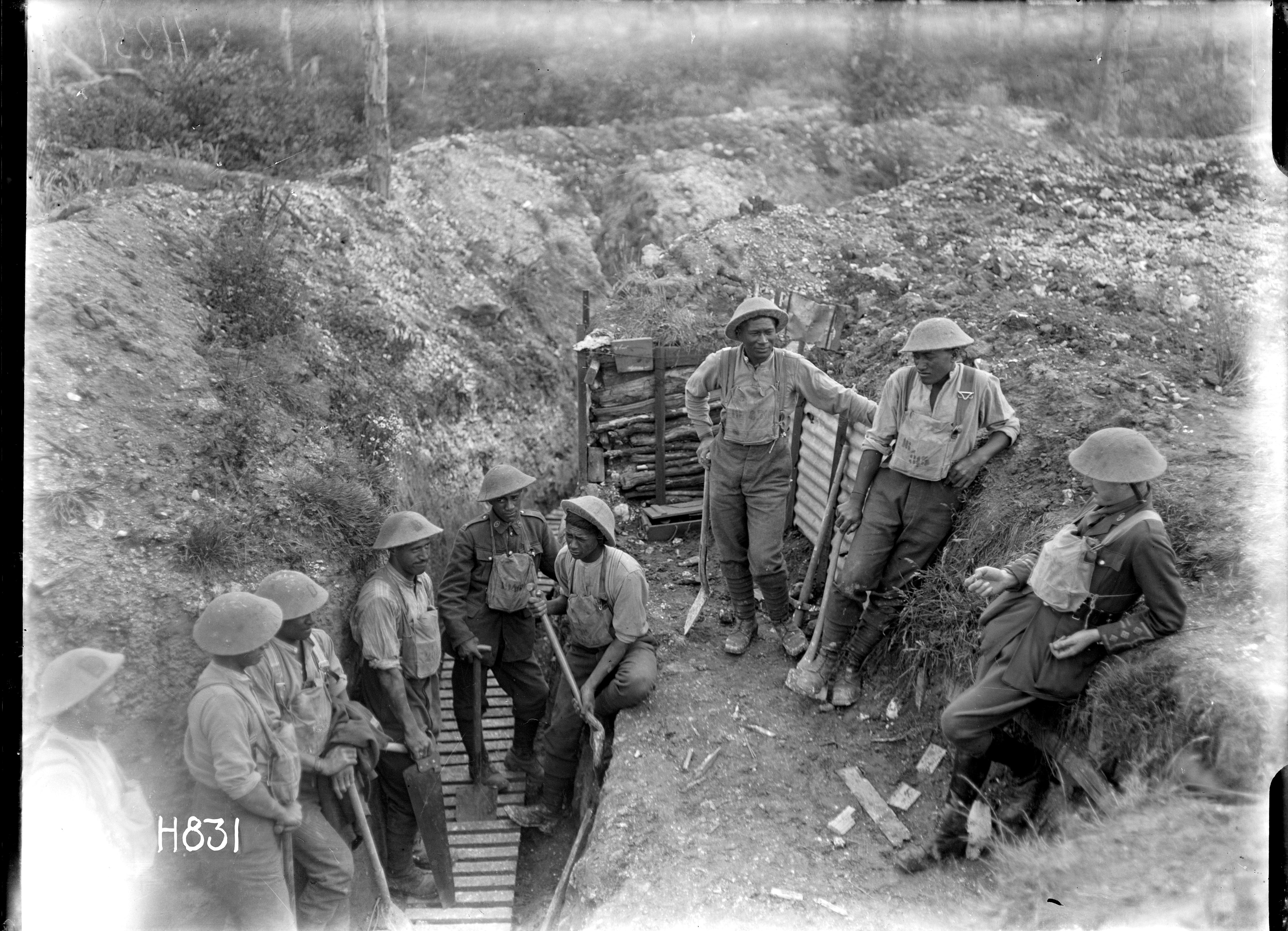
Māori pioneers during a break from working on digging trenches near Gommecourt in France

During the winter months of 1916 the pioneers were well behind the front lines in comfortable billets where they were able to use local cafes and hotels, and socialise with French civilians. Often during these times they were able to play rugby against other military teams. In letters home they praised the French beer which was very cheap, and the good quality champagne. They had time to observe French farmers and those soldiers with a farming background made critical comments about the backward French methods. Although leave was rare most soldiers had a chance to visit England and Scotland to take in the sights. They had the opportunity to visit tourist attractions in London. The war diaries of the battalion say casualties were well below the rate for the New Zealand Division, but this was due to their service being primarily behind the lines. On at least one occasion the battalion was used to launch stealthy attacks on German trenches, armed with bayonets and patu.

In late August 1916 the battalion was engaged at the Somme, and began work on creating the communication trench which became known as Turk Lane. It was more than 7 mi long, 5 ft 6in deep, 5 ft 6in wide at the top and 3 ft wide at the bottom, and a contemporary report said the Māori "made themselves famous by the digging of the Turk-line".

At Messines Ridge, the battalion suffered 155 casualties, including 17 deaths. In December 1916, 43 Māori soldiers from the Māori Pioneer Battalion joined the New Zealand Tunnelling Company in the lead-up to the Battle of Arras. In 1917 the remnants of the Otago Mounted Rifles Regiment, which made up 50 per cent of the battalion's remaining strength, was replaced by newly arrived Māori reinforcements.

On 1 October that year they became the New Zealand Māori (Pioneer) Battalion. The old New Zealand New Zealand Native Contingent badge, modified with "N.Z." replacing "NZNC", replaced the 1916 "NZ Pioneers" badge. In December, the New Zealand Gazette noted two pioneer battalions—New Zealand Pioneer Battalion and New Zealand Māori (Pioneer) Battalion. Around the same time a contingent of 150 Niue Islanders was sent home after difficulty adapting to the conditions in Western Europe. The last reinforcements were predominantly composed of Cook Islanders, most of which were assigned to the Rarotongan company engaged in the Palestine campaign. At the conclusion of the war the battalion was involved in an unpleasant incident when a group of Māori soldiers, possibly suffering from battle fatigue, started shooting in a rest camp. When an officer was sent to investigate he was shot.

=== Post-War ===
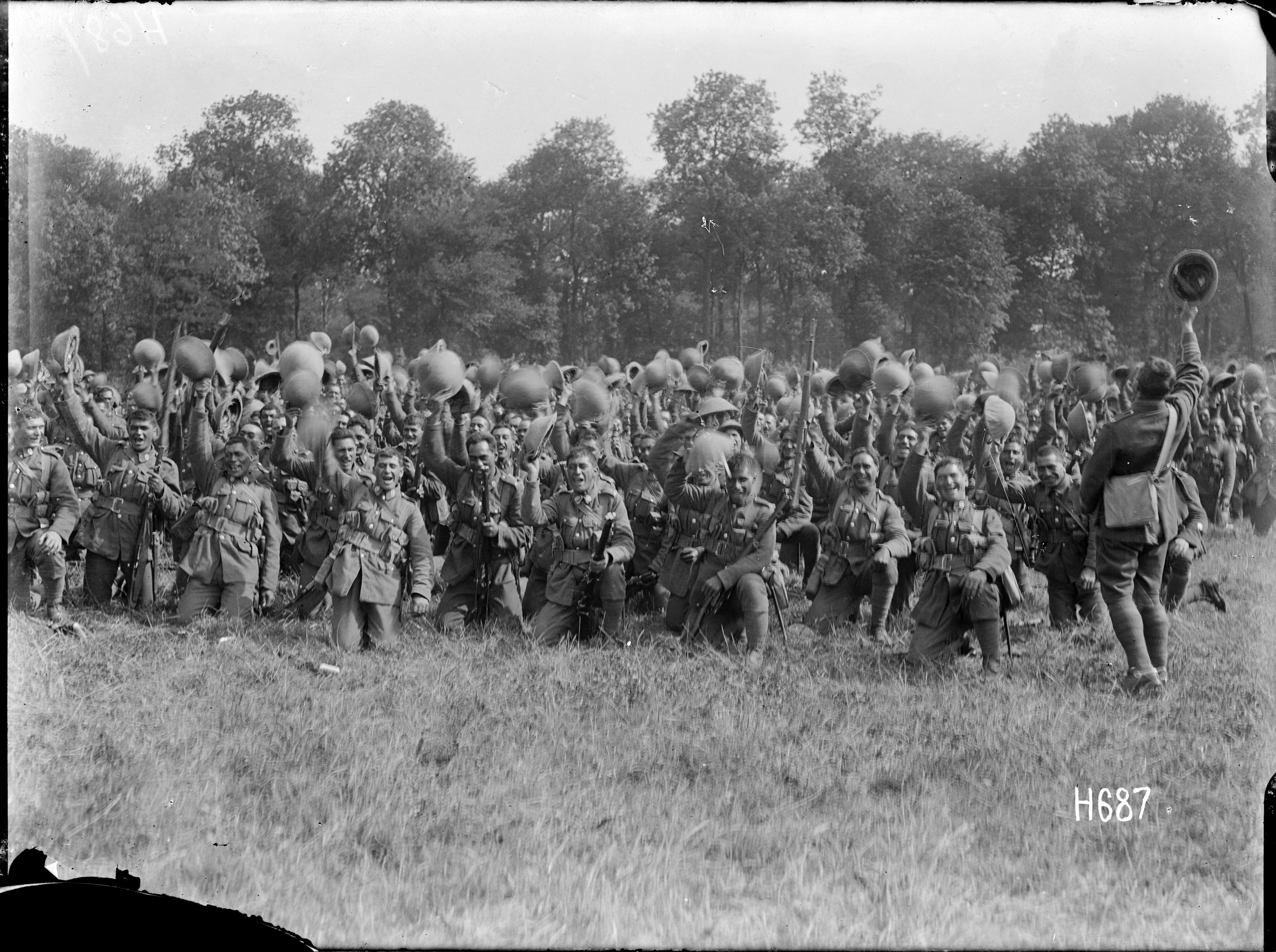
Members of the Pioneer Battalion give a rousing farewell to the visiting Prime Minister William Massey and his deputy, Sir Joseph Ward

After the war, the Pioneer Battalion was the only unit of the New Zealand Expeditionary Force to return home as a formed body. It arrived at Auckland aboard Westmoreland, disembarking on 6 April 1919 to band music and a welcome by Minister of Defence James Allen, before marching to the Auckland Domain. In front of various tribal representatives, a pōwhiri (welcome ceremony) was performed. The various companies of the battalion then dispersed to their home regions and further pōwhiri at local marae.

Over, 2,200 Māori served in the Pioneer Battalion during the course of the First World War, alongside nearly 460 Pacific Islanders. Over 730 personnel were wounded while 336 died while on active service.
