= Ropata Wahawaha =

Māori chief and military leader (1820–1897)

Major Ropata Wahawaha NZC
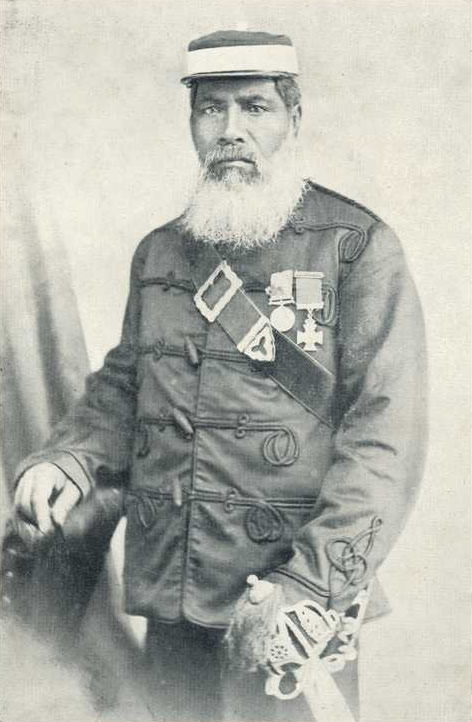
- Wahawaha, as pictured in The Story of a Maori Chief
- Born: Rāpata Wahawaha (childhood) c. 1820; Te Puia Springs or Akuaku, Waiapu, Colony of New South Wales
- Died: 1 July 1897 (aged c. 76–77); Gisborne, New Zealand
- Burial place: Rock fortress of Puputa in the Waiomatatini Valley
- Relatives: Āpirana Ngata (great-nephew)
- Military career
- Allegiance: Ngāti Porou; Kūpapa (British Empire)
- Service years: 1865–1871
- Rank: Major
- Conflicts: New Zealand Wars: East Cape War; Te Kooti's War
- Awards: New Zealand Cross; Sword of Honour; New Zealand War Medal
- Other work: Rangatira; politician; chairman of Waiomatatini School Committee

Ropata Wahawaha NZC (c. 1820 – 1 July 1897) was a Māori military leader and rangatira (chief) of the Ngāti Porou iwi (tribe) who rose to prominence during New Zealand's East Cape War and Te Kooti's War.

Born in 1820 in the Waiapu Valley on the East Cape, he was enslaved as a boy and became known as Rāpata Wahawaha. He later obtained his freedom and as an adult, became known as Ropata. In 1865, he fought against the Pai Mārire religious movement when it expanded into the East Cape area. During the conflict, he became rangatira of Te Aowera, a hapū (subtribe) of Ngāti Porou. As a Kūpapa, a Māori allied to the New Zealand Government, he fought alongside the Volunteer Force, New Zealand's militia, and led war parties against the Pai Mārire and their presence in the East Cape region was largely eliminated by mid-1866.

From 1868 to 1871, he commanded Ngāti Porou war parties in the pursuit of Te Kooti, a rebel Māori leader whose religious movement, Ringatū, threatened the security of the East Cape region. During the conflict he played a key role in the capture of Te Kooti's pā (hill fort) at Ngatapa, for which he was awarded the New Zealand Cross and was made a major in the Volunteer Force. His pursuit of Te Kooti was motivated by a desire to ensure that Ngāti Porou land was not subject to seizure by the Government. In his later years, he commanded the militia in the Ngāti Porou district, was a land agent and a member of the Legislative Council.

== Early life ==
Rāpata Wahawaha was born about 1820 either in Te Puia Springs or Akuaku, in the Waiapu Valley on the East Cape. He was the son of Hīpora Koroua and Te Hapamana Te Whao. He was of the Te Aowera hapū (sub-tribe) of the Ngāti Porou iwi (tribe), one of the major Māori iwi in the eastern regions of the North Island of New Zealand.

As a child Ropata was captured by the Rongowhakaata iwi during a conflict with Ngāti Porou over disputed land. He became the slave of Rāpata Whakapuhia whose name he perforce adopted. However, in later years when he rose to prominence he worked closely with Donald McLean who, having a broad Scottish accent, habitually pronounced his name as "Ropata" and it became the name by which he is generally known. He preferred this as it disassociated him from the period of life when he was a slave. By 1839 Ropata had gained his freedom and was living with the Ngāti Porou. He was married to Harata Te Ihi whose nephew, Paratene Ngata, was raised in their household.

== East Cape War ==
Little is known of Ropata's life following his marriage until 1865, when the East Cape War broke out. Ngāti Porou had become divided following the arrival on the East Cape that year of the leaders of the Pai Mārire religious movement. The religion espoused its followers, known as Hauhau, immunity to bullets and sought to move pākehā (European New Zealanders) off Maori land. It also advocated for the Kingites. Some of the hapū of Ngāti Porou converted to the new religion while others opposed it.

Owing to the work of missionaries in the area since the 1830s, many Ngāti Porou, including Ropata's hapū, had a strong Christian faith. They were angered by the murder of Carl Völkner by the Hauhau in early 1865. Furthermore, they realised that alignment with Pai Mārire would lead to conflict with the New Zealand Government, and a risk of confiscation of their land, as had happened elsewhere in the country.

=== Waiapu Valley campaign ===
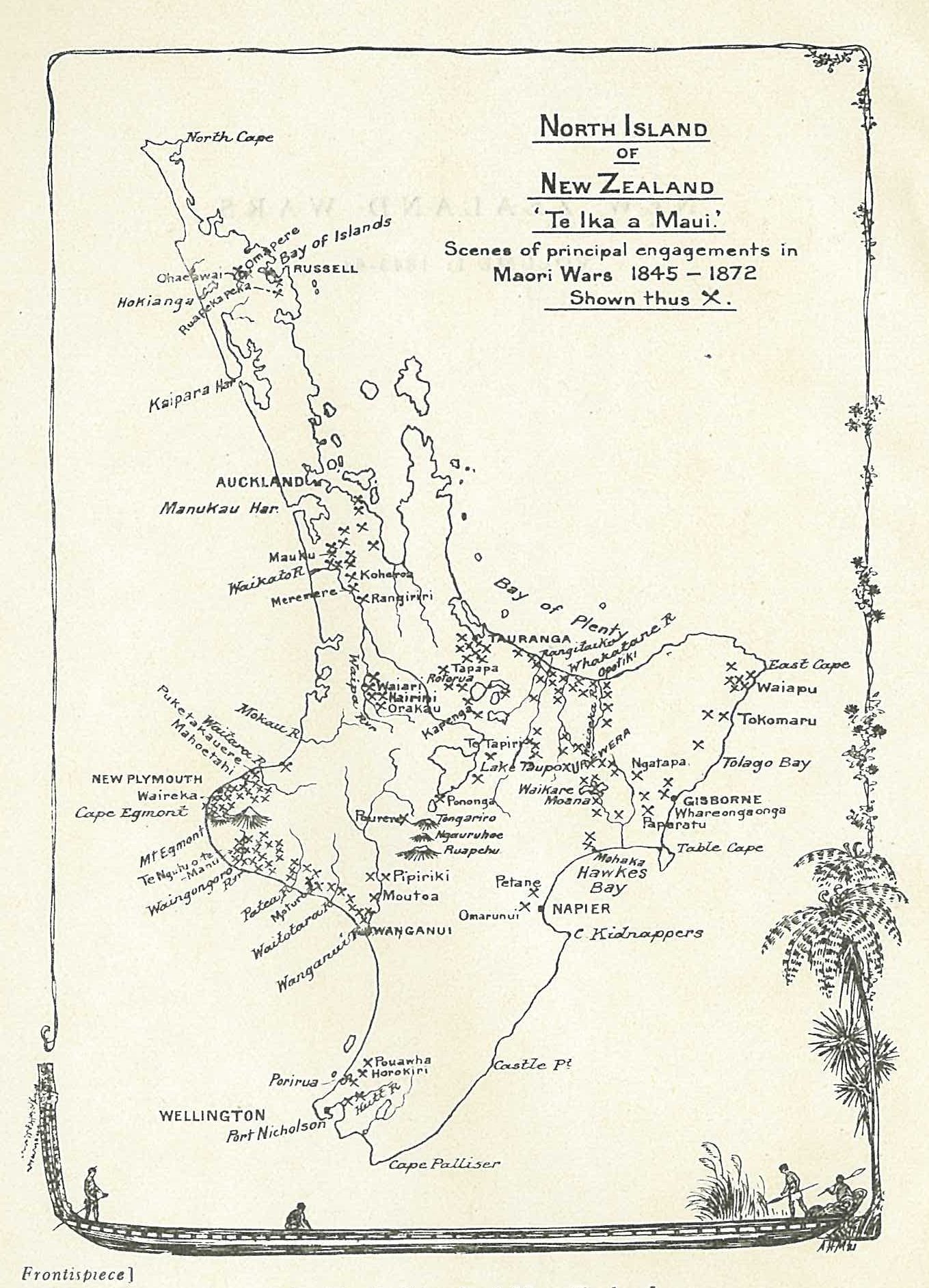
Map of the North Island of New Zealand, showing sites of key battles during the conflicts of the 1840s to 1870s

Ropata himself was staunchly Anglican, and was a founding member of the diocese of Waiapu. On 5 June, he was among a number of Te Aowera attending celebrations for the establishment of a church at Popoti, when they were advised that some Hauhau had arrived in the Waiapu Valley. In response to pleas by a Ngāti Porou leader, he gathered a party of 40 men, mainly from his own hapū of Te Aowera. His party was poorly equipped, with only a few flintlock muskets among them, and traditional weapons such as mere (club) and taiaha (staff). In contrast, the Hauhau were armed with modern rifles. On 20 June Ropata led an attack on the Hauhau, who had established a pā (hill fort) at Mangaone. Although the Te Aowera were defeated, Ropata gained some notoriety when, in single combat, he killed a Hauhau leader. The rangatira (chief) of the Te Aowera was killed in the engagement and Ropata succeeded him as the leader of his hapū. He suffered another defeat two days later when his party was driven off during an attack of the Hauhau's pā at Pukemaire. In addition, their own pā at Tikitiki was captured.

When the Hauhau arrived in Waiapu Valley, Mōkena Kōhere, a senior rangatira of Ngāti Porou, had appealed to Donald McLean, the superintendent for the Hawke's Bay Province, for assistance. Much needed supplies were subsequently sent along with one hundred militia, who arrived at Te Hatepe pā, to where Ropata and his party had withdrawn. His force now numbered around 85, following the arrival of Te Aowera reinforcements. The arrival of personnel of the Volunteer Force, New Zealand's militia, on 13 July further boosted numbers. This proved timely for the Hauhau attacked the next day and were driven off.

Further defeats followed for the Hauhau, thanks to the intervention of the militia, but Ropata also played key roles in the fighting; He staged a successful ambush of Hauhau forces in late July and, equipped with modern weapons, later carried out campaigns alongside Henare Potae, another rangatira of Ngāti Porou, towards Tokomaru Bay and Tolaga Bay, seizing Hauhau pā. By this time, he had established himself as a respected warrior and rangatira among Ngāti Porou. He was also regarded as ruthless: according to an account written in 1879 by Walter Gudgeon, at one point Ropata found some men from his own hapū, Te Aowera, among a group of Hauhau prisoners and he personally shot each one. Monty Soutar, a Ngāti Porou historian, disputes this, writing in 2000 that no evidence in contemporary records could be found to support this action occurred.

On 3 October, in conjunction with over 100 militia, Ropata's war party of 120 commenced a siege of the Pai Mārire stronghold of Pukemaire pā. Ropata, with a group of 12 warriors, dug a sap leading up to the palisade of the pā and pulled it down to gain entry. Although they had to withdraw, and poor weather delayed a renewed attack, the Hauhau abandoned Pukemaire a few days later and retreated to Hungahungatoroa. Ropata, with a group of his men, harried the Hauhau as they withdrew. On 13 October, they attacked Hungahungatoroa with Ropata part of a group sent to a ridge, overlooking the pā, to snipe at the Hauhau. At the suggestion of Mōkena Kōhere, negotiations commenced with defenders and the Ngāti Porou among them surrendered after receiving guarantees of their safety. The remainder, about 60, escaped out the rear of the pā. One, a senior leader of the Hauhau, was taken captive by Ropata; a colonial militia officer, upon discovering the identity of the prisoner, executed him. The action at Hungahungatoroa eliminated the last of the Hauhau strongholds in the Waiapu Valley. Some Ngāti Porou were allowed to return to their hapū after swearing allegiance to the Crown while others were sent to the Chatham Islands.

=== Shift to the Poverty Bay ===
There was still a Hauhau presence in Poverty Bay, to the south of the Waiapu Valley, centred on Waerenga-a-hika, a pā manned by around 400 to 500 Hauhau. The militia, despite being reinforced with troops brought in from Napier, only numbered 150 or so, inadequate to attack the pā. McLean sought Ropata's assistance to deal with the threat. He eagerly complied; many of the Hauhau in Poverty Bay were of the Rongowhakaata iwi, which had enslaved him as a child. Ropata gathered a Ngāti Porou war party of 300 warriors and joined the militia in what amounted to a seven-day siege on Waerenga-a-hika that commenced in mid-November. After an attempted breakout, the Hauhau were defeated and the survivors taken as prisoners to the Chatham Islands.

Ropata continued to lead his war party south, this time in assistance of the Ngāti Kahungunu iwi, which was aligned with the Government. In January 1866, he and 150 Ngāti Porou landed at Wairoa. Together with 150 militia and 250 warriors from Ngāti Kahungunu iwi, they pushed towards Lake Waikaremoana in pursuit of the Hauhau. When the force was ambushed on 12 January and its lead elements began to fall back, Ropata helped restore morale, moving forward and setting fire to the undergrowth which obscured the vision of the Hauhau. Unable to see in the face of the advancing Ropata and his men, they withdrew. Closely pursued, around 25 to 35 were killed and several others taken prisoner. The losses of Ngāti Kahungunu and Porou amounted to 14 killed, one being Ropata's uncle, mostly in the initial ambush. Few militia were involved in this engagement but one later recorded that Ropata executed four leaders of the Hauhau that were among the prisoners. He had initially proposed to spare those of Ngāti Kahungunu but this was not acceptable to that tribe's rangatira who wished to make an example for the rest of their iwi. The Government forces and their allies then returned to Wairoa. There was further engagements with the remaining Hauhau over the next few months, but these involved Ngāti Kahungunu. By the middle of the year, the Hauhau threat to the East Cape had largely been eliminated.

== Te Kooti's War ==
In July 1868, Ropata was called upon again by the Government to help deal with a new threat. This was Te Kooti, of Ngāti Maru, a hapū of Rongowhakaata iwi, who had recently escaped from captivity in the Chatham Islands. Te Kooti had been sent there when he was arrested in March 1866 as a spy during the campaign against the Hauhau in Poverty Bay. While on the Chathams, he had become a religious leader among the numerous exiled Hauhau, espousing his own faith, Ringatū, based upon the Bible. After two years, the prisoners had become frustrated at their treatment, having been held without trial, and Te Kooti led them in surprising their guards and seizing a vessel to sail back to New Zealand.

Te Kooti and his followers made landfall near Poverty Bay on 9 July 1868 and made their way inland shortly afterwards. The local militia commander, Captain Biggs, ordered some of his men in pursuit after an initial attempt by a local rangatira to negotiate with Te Kooti was rejected. The militia were defeated in an encounter on 20 July, and there would be further unsuccessful skirmishes with Te Kooti's men over the next several weeks. Te Kooti's ranks soon swelled with converts from among the Māori of the region, who in their fervour, murdered some Ngāti Kahungunu rangatira. In response, in late October, Ropata and his Ngāti Porou were brought in.

=== Ngatapa ===
Te Kooti, after mounting a raid on 10 November that saw a number of Māori and European settlers and farmers murdered, retreated to a strong defensive pā at Ngatapa. Ropata and his men, at Wairoa, went north to Gisborne (known at the time as Tūranga) and onto Ngatapa. The pa contained about 200 Ringatū warriors and around 300 other Māori, many of whom were prisoners taken in Te Kooti's raids. The first assault on 4 December, led by Ropata, Hōtene Porourangi, another rangatira of Ngāti Porou, and Lieutenants Mair and Preece of the Armed Constabulary, was unsuccessful. The pā was up on the peak of a ridge, and had strong fortifications including entrenchments and was palisaded. Although Ropata led a party in capturing a defensive trench, it had to be abandoned in the evening when they ran out of ammunition. Ropata pulled his men, tired by the march from Wairoa and the subsequent fighting, back to Tūranga. Despite this Ropata was awarded the New Zealand Cross (NZC) for his bravery and leading role in this action. The NZC had recently been established as a gallantry award for colonial personnel, and was regarded as being equivalent to a Victoria Cross (VC); those serving in New Zealand's colonial militia were ineligible for the VC unless they were under the command of British officers. Ropata was also made a major in the Armed Constabulary.

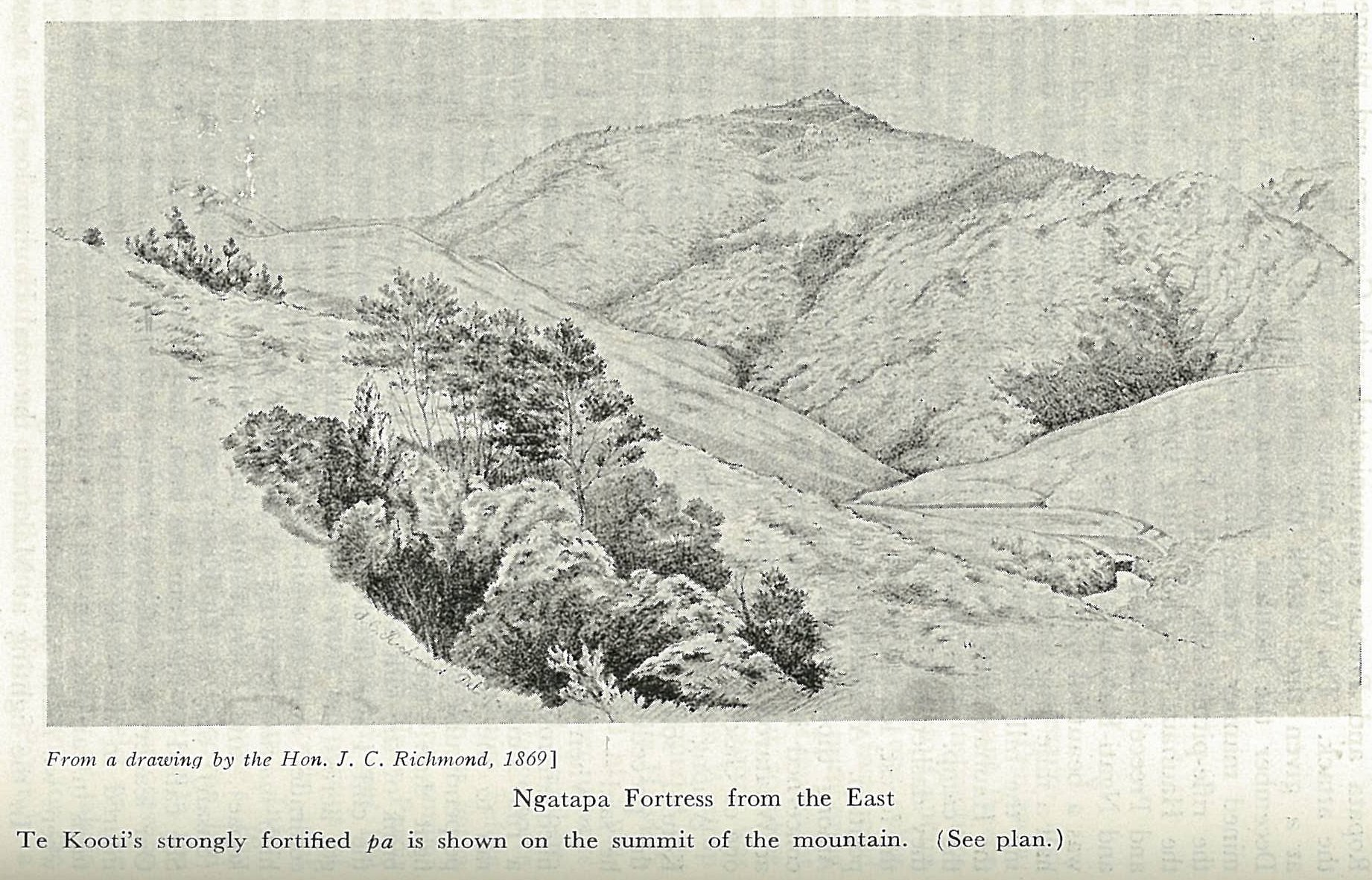
A view of Te Kooti's Ngatapa pā, positioned at the top of the peak

In early December, Colonel George Whitmore, commandant of the Armed Constabulary, arrived at Tūranga with 350 reinforcements for the local militia. They proceeded to Ngatapa after receiving reports that Te Kooti was still in the area and had not retreated to the Urewera country as first thought. In the meantime, Ropata had briefly returned to the East Cape to bring in more Ngāti Porou reinforcements and returned on 26 December with 300 men. Whitmore now had nearly 700 men, including 370 Ngāti Porou and 60 warriors of Te Arawa iwi, from the Bay of Plenty, under his command for an attack on Ngatapa. A tight cordon was thrown around the pā on 30 December, cutting off its water supply, and a siege commenced. An assault on 4 January 1869 breached the outer defences. This forced Te Kooti to evacuate the pā at dawn the next day, descending down steep, unguarded bluffs. Many of the escapees were captured by pursuing Ngāti Porou and Te Arawa. Around 136 of the Ringatū followers were killed, either during the siege itself or executed afterwards on the orders of Ropata. Te Kooti himself escaped and made his way to the Urewera country. Whitmore's force lost 11 men killed and eight wounded. Afterwards, he was effusive in his praise of Ropata's leadership and fighting skills. Indeed, it was Whitmore who had recommended Ropata for the NZC.

Whitmore sought Ropata's assistance for a campaign against Titokowaru, another rebel chief, in the Wanganui area, on the opposite coast of the North Island. Ropata declined to join; he, along with Donald McLean and Karaitiana Takamoana, the Ngāti Kahungunu rangatira, felt that Te Kooti remained a threat to the East Cape region and did not want to see the area and his people defenceless. The Minister of Colonial Defence, Theodore Haultain, and the Prime Minister, Edward Stafford, both felt that McLean, who did not like Whitmore, influenced Ropata's decision. When Whitmore found that Ropata and his men were unavailable, he expressed regret, considering them "the bravest hapu of the best bush tribe in New Zealand". Some within Ngāti Porou were critical of Ropata's decision and proceeded to join Whitmore in his campaign.

=== Urewera country ===
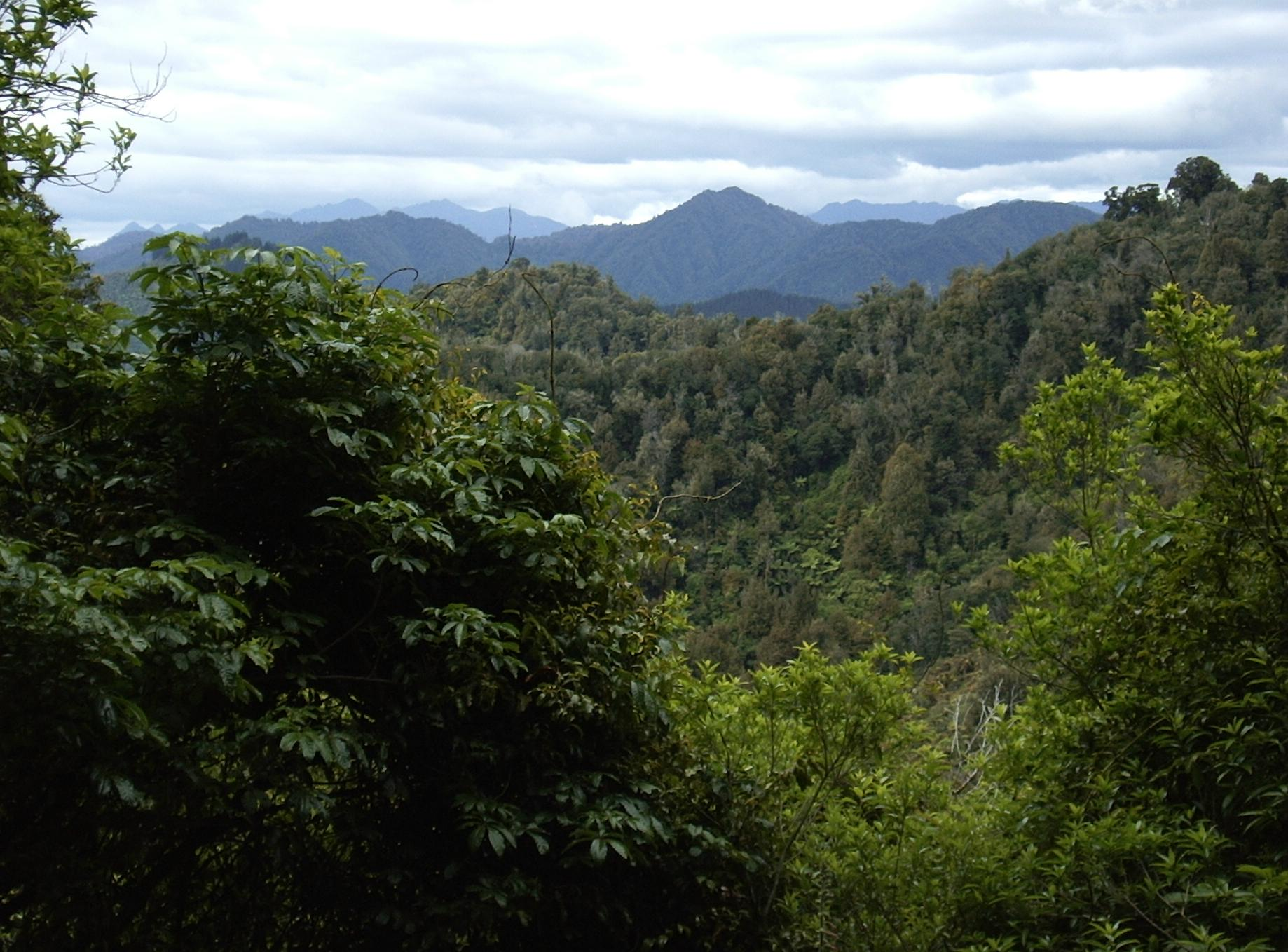
A view of the Urewera ranges, through which Ropata mounted several expeditions to hunt for Te Kooti

The Urewera country, to the west of East Cape, was rugged, mountainous terrain, and thickly forested, the home of the Ngāi Tūhoe iwi. The Government had alienated Tūhoe with confiscation of its most valuable land. Te Kooti and around 30 acolytes soon gathered followers from among Tūhoe and mounted raids on Ohiwa and Whakatane for supplies and weapons. His actions during these and later raids were particularly ruthless, and drew the ire of the iwi and hapū surrounding the Urewera country and encouraged them to support the Government. Whitmore mounted an invasion of the Urewera country in early May, inflicting many casualties on the Tūhoe and destroying their homes and cultivated lands. Ngāti Porou warriors were slow to become involved in Whitmore's invasion of the Urewera country, only joining an expedition at Lake Waikaremoana in late May and that was withdrawn the following month after Te Kooti moved to the Taupo plains.

In early 1870, the Government decided to withdraw all pākeha militia from the pursuit of Te Kooti, and entrust the hunt for him to kūpapa (Māori allied to the Government): the Ngāti Porou, under Ropata, and Maori from the Whanganui, under Te Keepa Te Rangihiwinui. The Te Arawa iwi would also be involved in the hunt for Te Kooti. Ropata was to command an East Cape invasion force, and manage its military operations. This was at the instigation of McLean, now the Minister of Defence, who had noted the success achieved by the kūpapa in the hunt for Te Kooti compared to the Armed Constabulary. Additional motivation was provided by a bounty of £5,000 for the capture of Te Kooti. Only one pākeha was allowed to accompany each of the Māori war parties; Ropata asked for and got Captain Thomas Porter, an officer of the Voluntary Cavalry in Poverty Bay. The East Cape party departed for the Urewera country on 28 February, numbering about 370 men. In his later writings, Porter commented favourably on Ropata's leadership and the resulting discipline and loyalty he instilled in his Ngāti Porou during the march to Maungapohatu, a key site for the Tūhoe. They captured the pa there, which had never before been attacked, with the loss of only one man. Then, in late March Te Keepa and Ropata managed to catch Te Kooti between their two forces at his pā at Maraetahi. In the ensuing battle the Ringatū force was destroyed. Te Kooti escaped but most of his men were either captured or killed.

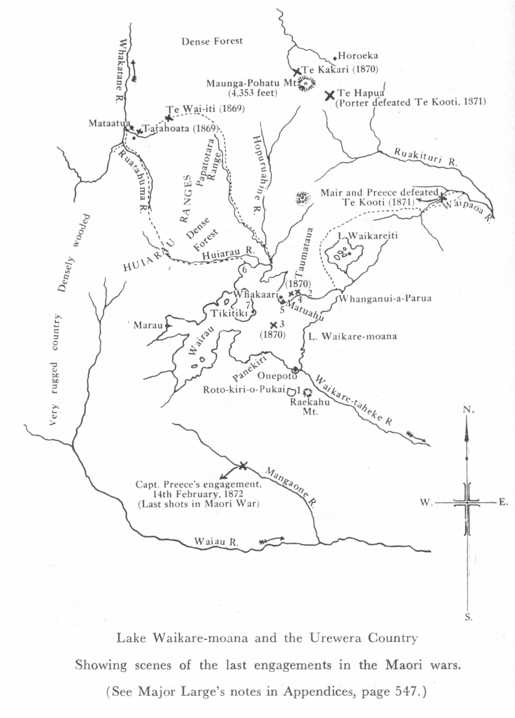
Map of Lake Waikaremoana and Urewera country, showing location of the major conflicts during Te Kooti's War

Despite Te Kooti evading capture, he was now largely a spent force. McLean was pleased with the result and rewarded Ngāti Porou by announcing the withdrawal of the Government's claim to disputed land on the East Cape. This prompted Ropata to raise another contingent of Ngāti Porou to pursue Te Kooti; Crosby notes his motivation was likely to ensure that McLean kept his word. He left Tūranga on 4 May with nearly 440 men, aiming to capture Ngāti Kowhatu, near the Mangaaruhe River. The weather conditions, being harsh, brought an end to the campaign which saw 22 prisoners captured. Ropata was also annoyed at the efforts of Ngāti Kahungunu, which had mounted a similar campaign at the same time, causing the Hauhau remnants to scatter. This reduced the effectiveness of Ropata's own operations. When Te Kooti raided a settlement at Uawa, on the East Cape, in late July, Ropata was seeking intelligence on his whereabouts. On hearing of the raid, he raised a war party of over 100 Ngāti Porou to pursue Te Kooti. After a few weeks of fruitless searching for Te Kooti in the bush around Taloga Bay, he withdrew.

Over the following months, Tūhoe envoys carried out peace negotiations with some of Te Kooti's allies in the Urewera country. A sticking point was security from repercussions launched by Te Kooti if peace was made. The prospect of a Ngāti Porou garrison force moving into the Urewera country for protection was raised by McLean with Ropata. This required a daily payment to Ngāti Porou participants since the purpose was not the capture of Te Kooti, and thus there was no bounty available. Ropata took a party of 170 warriors to the Urewera country in mid-January 1871. Despite no bounty being on offer for the capture of Te Kooti, Ropata decided to go by way of the Waimana valley to look for him. It was rumoured he was hiding there. Two weeks of fruitless searching followed before they proceeded to Maungapohatu, as a rangatira had advised Ropata that it would be better to pacify the Tūhoe there. This was achieved and he proceeded east, continuing to look for Te Kooti. A follower of his was captured, who provided useful intelligence and led them to Te Kooti's pā. Although he was not there, another key follower of his was captured and food supplies were destroyed. Ropata's expedition ended in April and they returned to Tūranga, worn out from the weeks of marching over the hill country of the Urerewas. Ropata himself was covered with boils.

Despite this, in June Ropata assembled another party to hunt for Te Kooti. His 200 men were split into four groups of 50 and pursued different routes. Ropata commanded one group and Porter another. Being mid-winter, conditions were harsh and by the time Ropata ended his search in early August, three of his men had died of exhaustion while many others were sick. He had succeeded in capturing small groups of Ringatū adherents who claimed to have lost contact with Te Kooti. Once in Gisborne, he received information that Te Kooti may be staying at a site on Lake Waikaremoana. Ropata almost immediately left for the area with a fresh group of Ngāti Porou warriors. Porter, still accompanying Ropata, struck out for sites previously searched to ensure that Te Kooti had not returned to them. He linked up with a Te Arawa party hunting Te Kooti after he escaped them following an attack on his campsite at Waipaoa. In the meantime, Ropata searched the likely areas where he believed Te Kooti might be. However, he became sick, and for most of September stayed in camp in the Mangaaruhe area while his party carried out local patrols. Porter's party had more success, and on 1 September his party surrounded Te Kooti's camp at Te Hapua, although Te Kooti himself escaped. Porter and Ropata, now recovered from his illness, met up at Maungapohatu, and then moved onto Ruatahuna, where they were advised that Kereopa Te Rau, who was one of the Hauhau involved in the murder of Völkner in 1865, was living a few hours away. Kereopa, who had a bounty of £1,000 for his capture, was seized in a surprise raid mounted by the Ngāti Porou party on 18 November. Following this, Tūhoe made peace with the Government, and Ropata withdrew his party, ending the Ngāti Porou campaigns in the Urewera country. The pursuit of Te Kooti was left to the Te Arawa.

== Later life ==
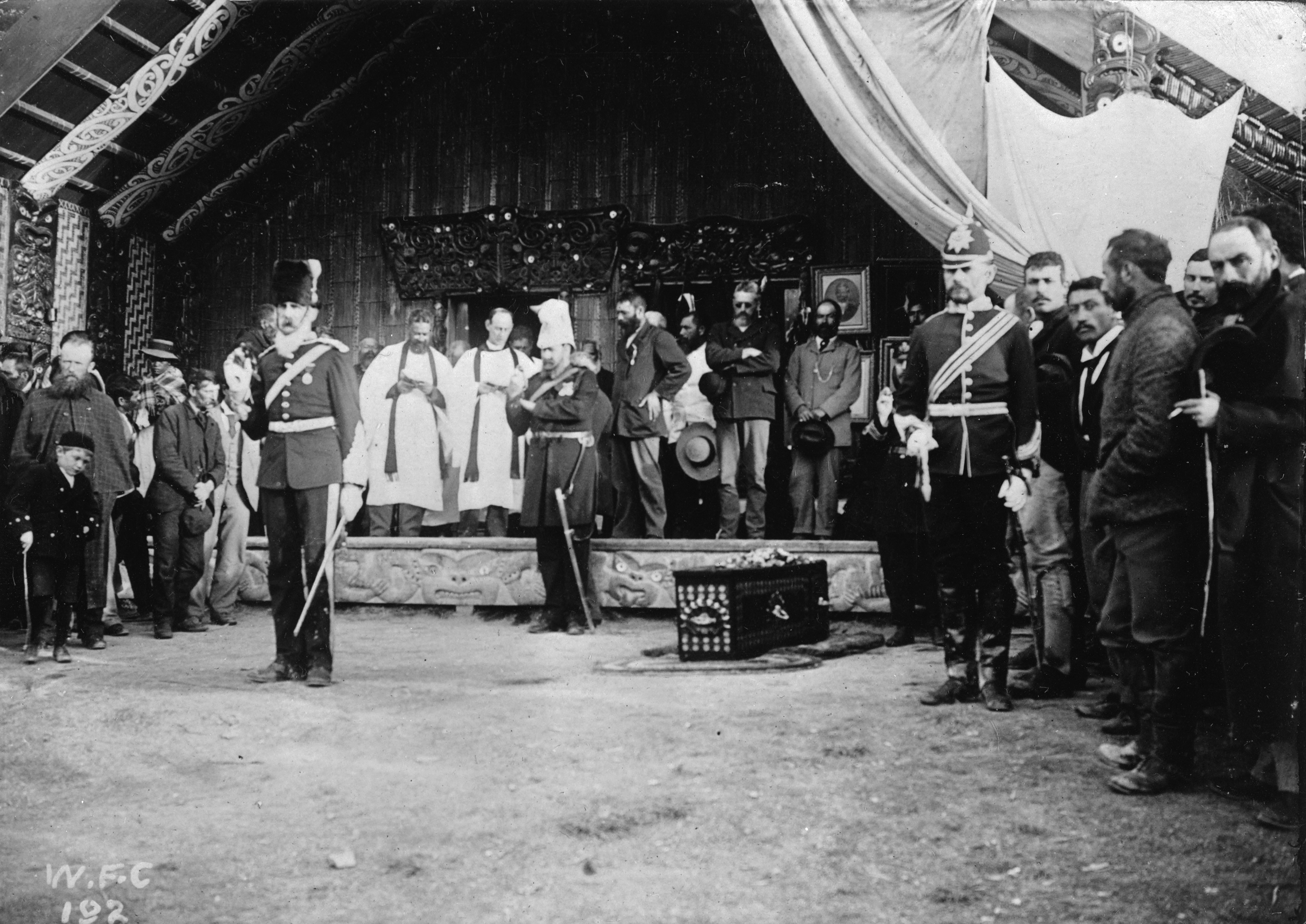
Ropata's funeral service, held in July 1897 at Porourangi marae at Waiōmatatini

By the end of Te Kooti's War Ropata was recognised as one of the leading men of Ngāti Porou due to his actions as a kūpapa. He used his influence to strengthen the iwi's position with the Government, ensuring that it maintained its promise to not confiscate Ngāti Porou land. Te Kooti himself continued to evade capture and was eventually given refuge in the King Country.

Ropata settled at Waiōmatatini and constructed a marae (meeting house) there, calling it Porourangi. An advocate for education, when a school was established at Waiōmatatini in 1871, he was its chairman. He would fine parents whose children did not attend the school without good reason. Conscious of his own inability in the language, he particularly urged teaching of English to Māori students. He became a land agent for the Government, facilitating the sale or leasing of Ngāti Porou land. This saw much of his iwi's land being leased, ensuring it remained in Ngāti Porou hands in the long term. He particularly encouraged the use of the Native Land Court to settle disputes. He also took up sheep farming. In his later years, his herd numbered over 2,400 sheep.

During the general election of 1875 he opposed Karaitiana Takamoana of Ngāti Kahungunu, who was standing for Parliament in the Eastern Maori electorate. Takamoana was the leader of the Repudiation movement, which involved some former Hauhau and sought to recover Māori land through litigation. Ropata was against the movement; he tried to exert undue influence in the electorate in favour of his preferred candidate for the seat, Hōtene Porourangi, but was unsuccessful.

In 1878 Ropata was awarded the Sword of Honour from Queen Victoria in recognition of his service in the conflicts against the Pai Mārire and Te Kooti. He was also entitled to the New Zealand War Medal. From 1878, he was commander of the regional militia, with a salary of £200 a year, until 1884, when cost-cutting measures saw an end to the position being salaried. In his later years, he received an annual pension of £100. On 10 May 1887 he was appointed a member of the Legislative Council. Two years later, he eventually got the chance to arrest Te Kooti, who had been pardoned in 1883. Since then Te Kooti had built up a large religious following. This was tolerated until 1889 when he decided to return to Poverty Bay, the scene of his earlier exploits. Ropata and Porter, still working together, were appointed by the then Prime Minister, Harry Atkinson, to make sure Te Kooti did not enter the East Cape or Urewera country. Ngāti Porou were mobilised and arrived on the scene just as Te Kooti was arrested by a police inspector, in time to prevent his followers from making a violent issue of it. Ropata missed the actual arrest because of ill health.

== Death and legacy ==
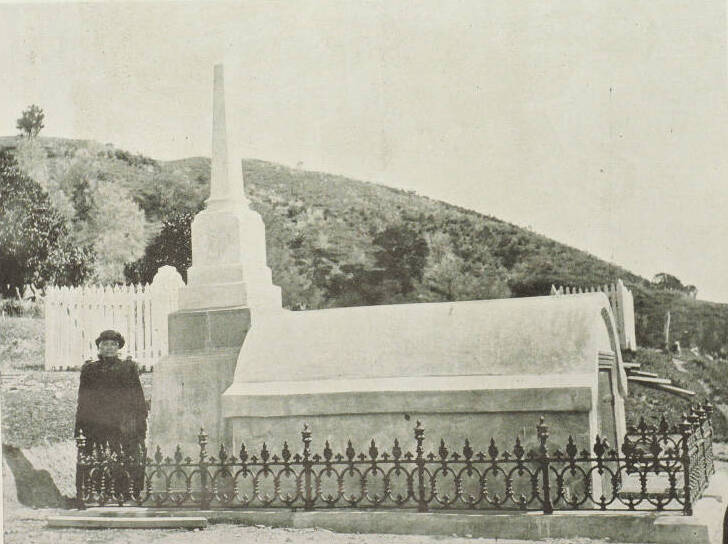
Wahawaha's tomb at Waiōmatatini

Ropata died in Gisborne on 1 July 1897. Before his death, he stressed to his hapu that they should remain united and loyal to the Crown, committed to Christianity and congenial to pākehā. He was buried with full military honours nearly two weeks later at an urupā (burial ground) on Puputa, a rocky outcrop behind the Porourangi marae at Waiōmatatini. Porter was a pall bearer. A year after his death, the Government erected a memorial at Puputa in recognition of Ropata's services to the Crown. His grand-nephew, Sir Āpirana Ngata, is buried nearby.

Since the 1860s, Ropata has been described as a Kūpapa, for example by historians James Belich and Michael King. This is generally understood as meaning Māori who were neutral or loyal to the Government. However, in recent times, the term has also been used in a derogatory sense, to refer to Māori who aligned themselves with the Government to the disadvantage of other Māori. According to Crosby, Ropata should be more correctly characterised as being loyal to his iwi and the honouring of the Treaty of Waitangi, which guaranteed the security of Ngāti Porou lands. He took a pragmatic approach to collaboration with the Government to ensure his iwi's land was not confiscated given that at least some Ngāti Porou became Hauhau during the East Cape War.
