= Hēnare Ngata =

New Zealand Māori leader

Sir Hēnare Ngata KBE JP
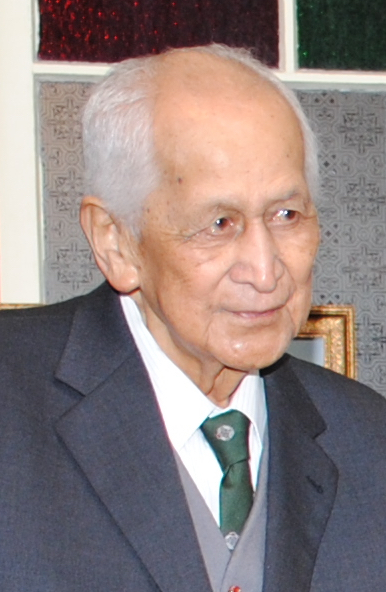
- Ngata in May 2011
- Born: Hēnare Kōhere Ngata; 19 December 1917; Waiomatatini, New Zealand
- Died: 11 December 2011 (aged 93); Gisborne, New Zealand
- Occupation: Accountant
- Years active: 1953–1990
- Known for: Māori leader
- Parents: Āpirana Ngata (father); Arihia Ngata (mother)
- Relatives: Hōri Ngata (nephew)

Sir Hēnare Kōhere Ngata KBE JP (19 December 1917 – 11 December 2011) was a Māori leader and accountant. A prisoner of war in Germany after his capture in Greece, he returned to New Zealand to finish his university studies and became an accountant. He held directorships and chaired boards in the Gisborne Region. He was particularly knowledgeable about Māori land issues and became a forceful advocate and legal expert. His alma mater, Victoria University of Wellington, awarded him an honorary doctorate (LLD) for his legal knowledge in 1979. Ngata was knighted in 1982 for services to the Māori people. He tried to follow his father, Āpirana Ngata, into politics but was unsuccessful when he stood in the 1969 general election.

== Early life ==
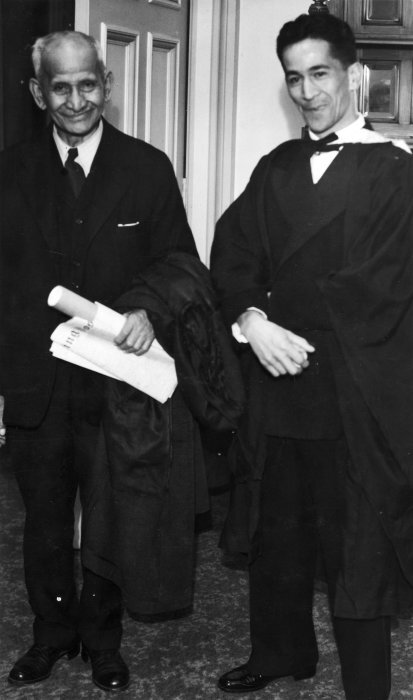
Ngata Sr and Jr both receiving their degrees in May 1948

Ngata was born in 1917 in Waiomatatini, a locality in the Waiapu Valley and on the south bank of the Waiapu River in the Gisborne District, New Zealand. His iwi was Ngāti Porou. He was named after Hēnare Kōhere, who had died in WWI in France in 1916. His parents were the politician Āpirana Ngata (1874–1950) and the community leader Arihia Ngata (née Tamati, 1879–1929). Ngata was their youngest son and of his 14 siblings, 10 survived to adulthood. The lexicographer Hōri Ngata (1919–1989), his nephew, was his eldest brother Mac's son. Whai Ngata was Hōri Ngata's son.

Ngata received his education at Waiomatatini School, Te Aute College, and Victoria University of Wellington. His tertiary studies were interrupted by WWII, but against the expectations of his father, he did not enlist immediately. He had a new girlfriend, Lorna Mete-Kingi, whom he had met at Victoria. He enlisted in October 1939 and received his military training at Trentham Military Camp. Before he went overseas, he married Mete-Kingi at Putiki near Wanganui on 24 February 1940. With the rank of sergeant major, he left New Zealand as part of the 28th Māori Battalion in May 1940. He initially went to England, then to Egypt in 1941 and later that year to Greece. On 29 April 1941, he was part of the large group of Māori Battalion soldiers captured by German forces. They remained prisoners of war in a German camp until they were liberated by American forces in 1945.

Disturbed by his war experiences, Ngata wanted to go back to Waiomatatini and not have contact with others. His father, though, directed him to finish his university studies, so the couple moved back to Wellington. On 7 May 1948, Ngata and his father both graduated; he with his Bachelor of Arts and his father with an honorary doctorate in literature (LittD). The following year, Ngata graduated with a Bachelor of Commerce.

== Later life ==
In 1949, the Ngatas moved to Gisborne. They had children through the Maori custom of adopting within the family (whāngai adoption). After his father's second wife died in May 1948, they took her mokopuna (either a grandchild or grand-niece) Wikitoria ("Wiki") Whyte as an 11-year-old who had until then been raised by them. In 1950, Lorna Ngata's sister-in-law was expecting a seventh child and Lorna asked whether they could have the child after birth; they named the boy Apirana ("Api") Turupa Maihi. In 1951, they adopted the then 11-year-old Sue Hinehou Rahera Cooper. She was a daughter of Ngata's late sister Hana Cooper (1909–1940).

Ngata worked as an accountant, first for Gisborne Sheep Farmers and then for McCullochs, Butler, & Spence. He then became self-employed at a time when this was very uncommon for Māori; he even had to overcome suspicion by fellow Māori before they would trust him with accountancy work for them. In 1959, he was appointed to the board of Mangatū Incorporation and was later their chairperson for 18 years. This led to further appointments as board chairperson. He held directorships with Fieldair Ltd, Gisborne Sheepfarmers Mercantile Ltd, and Gisborne Sheepfarmers Freezing Co Ltd. From 1962 to 1984, he was an inaugural member of the New Zealand Māori Council. He chaired and convened the council's Māori Land Committee from 1960 to 1984. He was a member of the Gisborne / East Coast Regional Development Council from 1973 to 1978. For a time, he was a member of the Gisborne Regional Committee of the New Zealand Historic Places Trust. He retired from his accountancy practice in 1990.

Ngata was highly regarded for his knowledge in Māori land management issues. While much land was in Māori ownership, the owners found it difficult to raise loans for development work against the land due to communal ownership. Ngata helped overcome the issues related with that. A forceful speaker, he was able to interpret and explain impact of legislation on Māori land ownership. Legislation that cause Ngata to speak out include the Māori Trustee Act 1953, the Public Works Act 1981, the Maori Affairs Amendment Act 1967, and the Foreshore and Seabed Act 2004.

=== Political career ===
Ngata was active in the National Party. He was one of five candidates who stood for selection in the Eastern Maori electorate for the 1954 election, but was defeated by Claude Anaru, the deputy-mayor of Rotorua. From 1967 to 1969, Ngata was Māori vice-president of the National Party. For the 1969 election, he was their candidate for Eastern Maori but was defeated by the Labour Party incumbent, Paraone Reweti.

=== Death ===
Ngata died on 11 December 2011 at his home in Gisborne and was buried at Taruheru Lawn Cemetery. Lady Lorna Ngata died in June 2014 aged 96.

== Awards and honours ==
In the 1967 Birthday Honours, Ngata was appointed Officer of the Most Excellent Order of the British Empire (OBE) for services to the Māori people. In 1979, he was awarded an honorary doctorate (LLD) from his alma mater. In the 1982 New Year Honours, his OBE was upgraded to Knight Commander. His wife was appointed a Companion of the Queen's Service Order for community service.
