= Paratene Ngata =

New Zealand Māori iwi (tribal) leader

Paratene Ngata (1849? – 15 December 1924) was a New Zealand Ngāti Porou leader, storekeeper, soldier, farmer and Native Land Court assessor. He was born near Waiomatatini in the Waiapu Valley, possibly in September 1849. His father was Wiremu Karaka Te Ito and his mother was Hera Te Ihi, known also as Ruataupare. He was raised in the household of Rapata Wahawaha, whose wife, Harata Te Ihi, was the sister of Ngata's mother. He married Katerina Naki, the daughter of an itinerant Scot, Abel Knox, and the elder of their two children was Āpirana Ngata.

Ngata accompanied Wahawaha in the East Coast War. He joined the Armed Constabulary in June 1869 and travelled to Taranaki for the campaign against Tītokowaru, but fighting had ceased before his company got there. After the wars he ran a store at Te Araroa, a hotel at Waipiro Bay, and the Waiomatatini sheep station, which Wahawaha had established. He also worked as an assessor for the Native Land Court. He stood for Parliament in the Eastern Maori electorate in 1893 general election, but polled in third place. He was the chairman of the Horouta Maori Council and an expert in traditional Maori lore. He was a member of the Anglican church.
