= Arihia Ngata =

Ngāti Porou leader (1879–1929)

Lady Ngata MBE
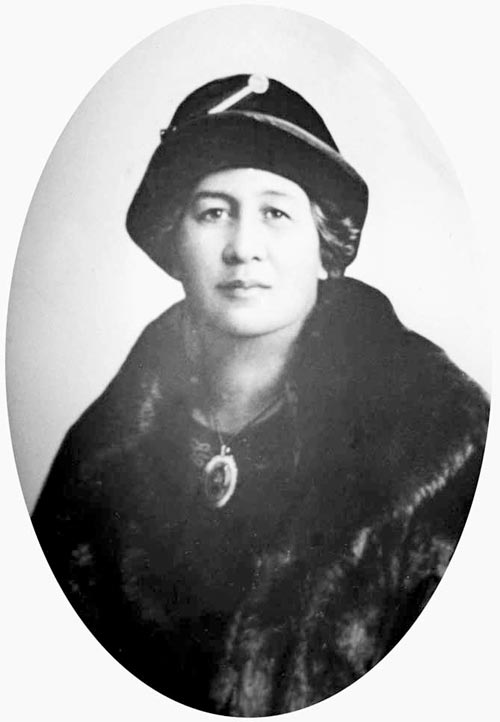
- Ngata, c. 1920
- Born: Arihia Kane Tāmati; 1879; Whareponga
- Died: 18 April 1929 (aged 49–50); Waiomatatini
- Known for: Ngāti Porou leader
- Spouse: Āpirana Ngata (m. 1895)
- Children: 15, including Hēnare Ngata

Arihia Kane Ngata, Lady Ngata, MBE (née Tāmati; 1879 – 18 April 1929) was a New Zealand community leader. Born at Whareponga, she married Āpirana Ngata at age sixteen, and together they had fifteen children. During the First World War she organised fundraising efforts and hosted young army recruits, and after the war she continued to host young men who came to learn sheepfarming skills from her iwi (tribe) of Ngāti Porou. She supported the temperance movement and the Anglican church, and throughout her life supported her husband's political efforts, including through taking a leadership role with Ngāti Porou. She died young after contracting dysentery.

== Early life and family ==
Ngata was born at Whareponga in 1879. She was the fourth of nine children of Mere Arihi Kākano and Tuta Tāmati, who owned and operated a hotel, and her family belonged to the local Te Aitanga-a-Mate hapū of Ngāti Porou.

Ngata's older sister, Te Rina, was betrothed to Āpirana Ngata, but died before the wedding, and Ngata took her place according to custom. She was sixteen at the time of the wedding in 1895, and moved to live with her husband in Auckland where he was studying at the University of Auckland. In 1899 they moved to his family home at Kākāriki near Ruatoria. Ngata and her husband had fifteen children, of whom eleven (six girls and five boys) survived to adulthood.

In 1905, Ngata's husband was elected to the New Zealand Parliament as the member for Eastern Maori, and in 1914, Ngata and her husband built a new house for their family at Waiomatatini, near Ruatoria. It was named 'Te Wharehou' (The House) but in later years came to be nicknamed 'The Bungalow'.

== Political involvement and leadership ==
Ngata was a skilled homemaker and host, and (helped by her extended family) catered for the large numbers of visitors that came to Te Wharehou to meet with her husband. During the First World War, Ngata organised fund-raising events and hosted young recruits. In 1917, when decorative carvings and tukutuku panels were unveiled at Te Wharehou, attendees contributed over £3,000 to help with expenses. She persuaded donors to instead contribute the money to the establishment of the Māori Soldiers' Fund.

In 1918, Ngata was made an MBE for her efforts during the war. After the war, young men from other tribes came to learn sheepfarming skills from Ngāti Porou. Ngata provided lodgings for those men, who often stayed for months at a time.

Ngata accompanied her husband to public functions, and was described as "a tiny woman, shy and very gentle". She supported her husband's political activities and like him was a supporter of temperance and the Anglican church. She stood in for him at Ngāti Porou hui when he was away on political business and was a woman of great mana. After her husband was knighted in 1927, she was entitled to use the title 'Lady'.

== Death and legacy ==
Ngata's oldest son, Mākarini, contracted dysentery at a hui held in March 1929 to mark the opening of the Tainui meeting house Māhinārangi, at Tūrangawaewae marae in Ngāruawāhia. He died on 8 April. Ngata, having nursed her son, caught the illness and died 10 days later on 18 April.

The Lady Arihia Memorial Hall was built at Waiomatatini in 1930 to support Porourangi marae, the ancestral house of Ngāti Porou. In 1938 the hall was demolished by a flood. It was rebuilt and reopened by Āpirana Ngata in 1950, shortly before his death. The Lady Arihia trophy for Māori women's hockey was also established in her memory.

Ngata worked with her husband on the design of the St. Michael and All Angels' Chapel at Hukarere Girls College, including the weaving of tukutuku panels. The chapel was consecrated on 1 November 1953.

In the 2004 New Year Honours, Ngata's youngest and last surviving daughter, Mate Huatahi Kaiwai (born Ngata), was made a Companion of the Queen's Service Order (QSO) for community service. She was an advocate for te reo Māori and worked for the Māori Language Commission. A documentary was made about her 90th birthday, called Kōkā Kahurangi ("precious mother"), which aired on Māori Television in 2006. On 19 October 2009, she died at her residence at Ruatoria, aged 94. She was interred next to her late husband Kaura-Ki-Te-Pakanga Kaiwai and her son Tanara Kaiwai at Pukearoha Urupa.

Ngata's youngest son, Sir Hēnare Ngata, died on 11 December 2011 aged 93. He was Māori vice-president of the New Zealand National Party from 1967 to 1969 and stood as the National Party candidate for Eastern Maori in 1969.

Ngata's grandson Hōri Mahue Ngata wrote a widely used Māori-English dictionary.
