= Whareponga =

Bay and rural community in Gisborne, New Zealand

- Interactive map of Whareponga
- Coordinates: 37.962085°S 178.368783°E
- Country: New Zealand
- Region: Gisborne District
- Ward: Tairāwhiti General Ward
- Electorates: East Cape; Ikaroa-Rāwhiti (Māori)

Government
  - Territorial authority: Gisborne District Council
  - Mayor of Gisborne: Rehette Stoltz
  - East Cape MP: Dana Kirkpatrick
  - Ikaroa-Rāwhiti MP: Cushla Tangaere-Manuel
- Time zone: UTC+12 (NZST)
  - Summer (DST): UTC+13 (NZDT)
- Postcode: 4081
- Area code: 06

Whareponga is a bay and rural community in the Gisborne District of New Zealand's North Island. It is located north of Waipiro Bay, and is the mouth of Whareponga Stream and Wharekaka Stream.

== Geography ==
The area has a rugged landscape, featuring green bush-covered hills and exposed cliffs.

== History ==
The local Ngāti Porou hapū of Te Aitanga a Mate takes its name from a common ancestor, Materoa. The Whareponga Marae, also affiliated with the Ngāi Tangihaere hapū, includes a meeting house named after Materoa.

Since the 19th century, most of the hapū has migrated to larger centres. New homes were built for returning families in 2017, with funding from Te Puni Kōkiri.

In October 2020, the Government committed $5,756,639 from the Provincial Growth Fund to upgrade the Whareponga Marae and 28 other Ngāti Porou marae. The funding was expected to create 205 jobs.

== Demographics ==
Demographics for Whareponga are included at Hiruharama#Demographics.

== Notable people ==
- Moana-Nui-a-Kiwa Ngarimu, soldier and VC recipient
- Arihia Ngata, community leader
