= Learning Media Limited =

Learning Media Limited (Māori: Te Pou Taki Kōrero) was a New Zealand state-owned enterprise. The company published most of the Ministry of Education's material. A division of the Ministry until 1993, it continued to publish the New Zealand School Journal and Junior Journal magazines and the Ready to Read readers for the Ministry, as well as provide services for other organisations.

It was formed from three former divisions of the abolished Department of Education in 1989, most notably the School Publications Branch, which had hitherto published the School Journal.

It published an English–Māori dictionary by H. M. Ngata, first in print as English–Maori Dictionary in 1993, and later on the web as the Ngata Dictionary.

Learning Media was wound up in September 2013.
