= George Augustus King =

New Zealand Military Forces officer

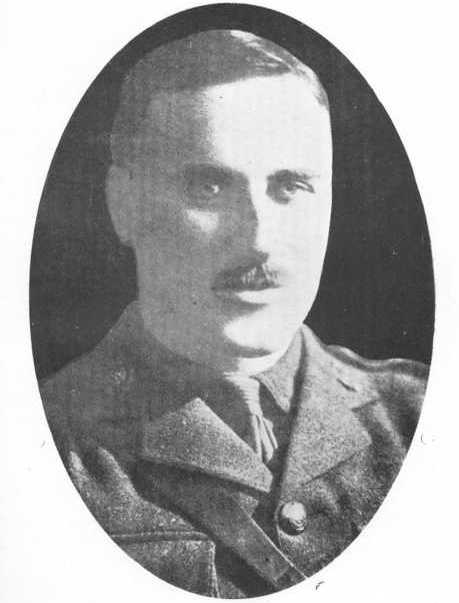
- Portrait of George King, circa 1916–1917
- Born: 3 March 1885; Christchurch, New Zealand
- Died: 12 October 1917 (aged 32) †; Passchendaele salient, Belgium
- Military career
- Allegiance: New Zealand
- Branch: New Zealand Military Forces
- Rank: Lieutenant-Colonel
- Commands: New Zealand Pioneer Battalion; 1st Battalion, Canterbury Infantry Regiment
- Conflicts: First World War; Gallipoli Campaign (WIA); Western Front; Battle of the Somme; Battle of Messines; Battle of Passchendaele; Battle of Broodseinde; First Battle of Passchendaele †
- Awards: Distinguished Service Order and Bar; Croix de Guerre

Lieutenant-Colonel George Augustus King DSO & Bar (3 March 1885 – 12 October 1917) was a New Zealander who served in the New Zealand Military Forces during the First World War.

Born in Christchurch, King worked in surveying and farming before he became a professional soldier in New Zealand's Permanent Forces in 1910. He volunteered for the New Zealand Expeditionary Force following the outbreak of the First World War. After participating in the Gallipoli Campaign, he was selected by the commander of the newly formed New Zealand Division, Major General Russell, for command of the New Zealand Pioneer Battalion on the Western Front. He later commanded a battalion in the Canterbury Infantry Regiment and was killed in action during the Battle of Passchendaele in 1917.

== Early life ==
King, the son of a merchant, was born in Christchurch, New Zealand on 3 March 1885. Following his schooling at Warwick House School and then Christ's College, he worked as a shepherd. He later performed surveying work in the Hawke's Bay before working on his father's sheep farm in Nelson.

== Military career ==
Having always had an interest in the military, King decided to make it his profession and joined the New Zealand Permanent Forces in 1910, having previously served with the local Cadet Corps and militia. Commissioned as a lieutenant in the New Zealand Staff Corps, he was posted to Hamilton as adjutant of the 4th (Waikato) Mounted Rifles.

=== First World War ===
Following the outbreak of First World War, King volunteered for the New Zealand Expeditionary Force and embarked for the Middle East in October 1914. He was appointed staff captain to the then Colonel Andrew Russell, commander of the New Zealand Mounted Rifles Brigade. The brigade was initially based in Egypt and did not participate in the 25 April 1915 landings at Gallipoli which marked the start of the Gallipoli campaign.

The following month, King and the brigade moved to the Gallipoli peninsula to fight as infantry. During the August offensive King, having been promoted to major, commanded the Auckland Mounted Rifles Regiment, and was wounded on 27 August during a battle for Hill 60. Evacuated from Gallipoli, King was appointed to the Distinguished Service Order for his "distinguished service in the field" during the campaign.

After recovering from his wounds, in February 1916 King was appointed commander of the New Zealand Pioneer Battalion. The battalion was part of the New Zealand Division then being formed by Russell (now a major general) in Egypt following the withdrawal of Allied forces from Gallipoli. The battalion was a mix of personnel which included the survivors of the Otago Mounted Rifles, the New Zealand Native Contingent and Pacific Islanders. King, well regarded by Russell, set about merging the various elements of the battalion, many of whom were not particularly happy at losing the identity of their parent formations, into an effective unit.

The battalion embarked for the Western Front after two months training. Although intended as labour force for preparing trenches and the like, the battalion also conducted trench raids in the early stages of its tenure in the trenches although these were unsuccessful. The battalion was based in the Somme where it would construct communication trenches in preparation for the Battle of the Somme. One trench, called Turk Lane and which King was particularly proud of, was approximately two kilometres long. Under King's leadership, the battalion quickly gained a reputation for its quality work, its digging exploits earning the battalion the nickname of Diggers (this nickname would soon be extended to the New Zealand Division and the Australian Divisions also became known by this nickname as well). King's distinguished work with the battalion would later be recognised with the gazetting in January 1918 of a bar to his DSO.

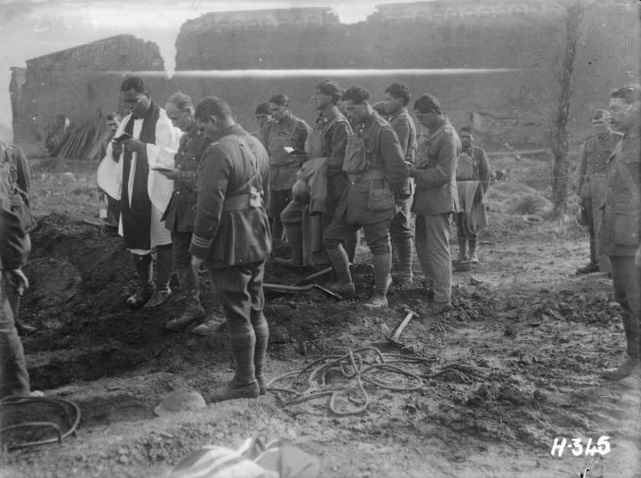
New Zealand Pioneer Battalion soldiers at the funeral of Lieutenant-Colonel King at Ypres, Belgium

The battalion shifted north to Belgium in early 1917, and began work preparing the necessary infrastructure for the forthcoming Battle of Messines. For a month from early July, it was attached to the New Zealand Rifle Brigade, which was temporarily part of the French First Army. During this period, it was based in the area around Ypres, constructing roads and trenches. For his service during this brief attachment to the French Army, King was awarded the Croix de Guerre.

In late August 1917, King was appointed commander of 1st Battalion, Canterbury Infantry Regiment. He would be in command of the battalion for just over a month. Having led the battalion during the Battle of Broodseinde and in the early stages of the Battle of Passchendaele in October, he was killed during an artillery barrage on his battalion headquarters on 12 October during the First Battle of Passchendaele. Highly regarded by those under his command, he was buried in Ypres. Māori soldiers of the New Zealand Pioneer Battalion performed a waiata tangi, normally reserved for high-ranking chiefs, during his funeral.

King was survived by his wife Annie, whom he married in 1910, and two children, Edward and Nancy. Andrew Russell, King's former commanding officer, would assist in the education of his children. Edward later became a group captain in the Royal New Zealand Air Force.
