= Hiruharama =

Village in the Gisbourne District of New Zealand

- Locality
- Interactive map of Hiruharama
- Coordinates: 37.924°S 178.260°E
- Country: New Zealand
- Region: Gisborne Region
- Ward: Tairāwhiti General Ward
- Electorates: East Cape; Ikaroa-Rāwhiti (Māori)

Government
  - Territorial authority: Gisborne District Council
  - Mayor of Gisborne: Rehette Stoltz
  - East Cape MP: Dana Kirkpatrick
  - Ikaroa-Rāwhiti MP: Cushla Tangaere-Manuel

Area
  - Total: 78.86 km^{2} (30.45 sq mi)

Population (2023 Census)
  - Total: 222
  - Density: 2.82/km^{2} (7.29/sq mi)
- Time zone: UTC+12 (NZST)
  - Summer (DST): UTC+13 (NZDT)
- Postcode: 4081
- Area code: 06

Hiruhārama is a village and rural community in the Gisborne District of New Zealand's North Island. It is located just south of Ruatoria and north of Makarika, on State Highway 35.

The area has two marae. Hiruharama Marae and Kapohanga a Rangi meeting house is a meeting place of the Ngāti Porou hapū of Te Aitanga a Mate and Te Aowera. Te Aowera Marae and Te Poho o Te Aowera meeting house is a meeting place of Te Aowera.

Wiremu Parker, New Zealand's first Māori news broadcaster, was raised and educated in Hiruharama and nearby Makarika.

== Demographics ==
Hiruharama and its surrounds, which include Whareponga on the Pacific coast, cover 78.86 km^{2} (30.45 sq mi). It is part of the Ruatōria-Raukumara statistical area.

Historical population for Hiruharama and surrounds
Year	Pop.	±% p.a.
2006	174	—
2013	174	+0.00%
2018	165	−1.06%
2023	222	+6.11%

Hiruharama had a population of 222 in the 2023 New Zealand census, an increase of 57 people (34.5%) since the 2018 census, and an increase of 48 people (27.6%) since the 2013 census. There were 111 males and 111 females in 57 dwellings. The median age was 34.3 years (compared with 38.1 years nationally). There were 54 people (24.3%) aged under 15 years, 39 (17.6%) aged 15 to 29, 96 (43.2%) aged 30 to 64, and 30 (13.5%) aged 65 or older.

People could identify as more than one ethnicity. The results were 23.0% European (Pākehā), 95.9% Māori, 1.4% Pasifika, and 1.4% Asian. English was spoken by 93.2%, Māori by 41.9%, and other languages by 1.4%. No language could be spoken by 1.4% (e.g. too young to talk). New Zealand Sign Language was known by 1.4%. The percentage of people born overseas was 6.8, compared with 28.8% nationally.

Religious affiliations were 35.1% Christian, 5.4% Māori religious beliefs, and 1.4% New Age. People who answered that they had no religion were 47.3%, and 8.1% of people did not answer the census question.

Of those at least 15 years old, 15 (8.9%) people had a bachelor's or higher degree, 93 (55.4%) had a post-high school certificate or diploma, and 63 (37.5%) people exclusively held high school qualifications. The median income was $26,400, compared with $41,500 nationally. 3 people (1.8%) earned over $100,000 compared to 12.1% nationally. The employment status of those at least 15 was 66 (39.3%) full-time, 18 (10.7%) part-time, and 12 (7.1%) unemployed.

== Education ==
Hiruharama School (Te Kura o Hiruharama) is a Year 1–8 co-educational public primary school with a roll of 104 students as of July 2026. It opened in 1895.
