= Waipiro Bay =

Waipiro Bay Waipiro (Māori)
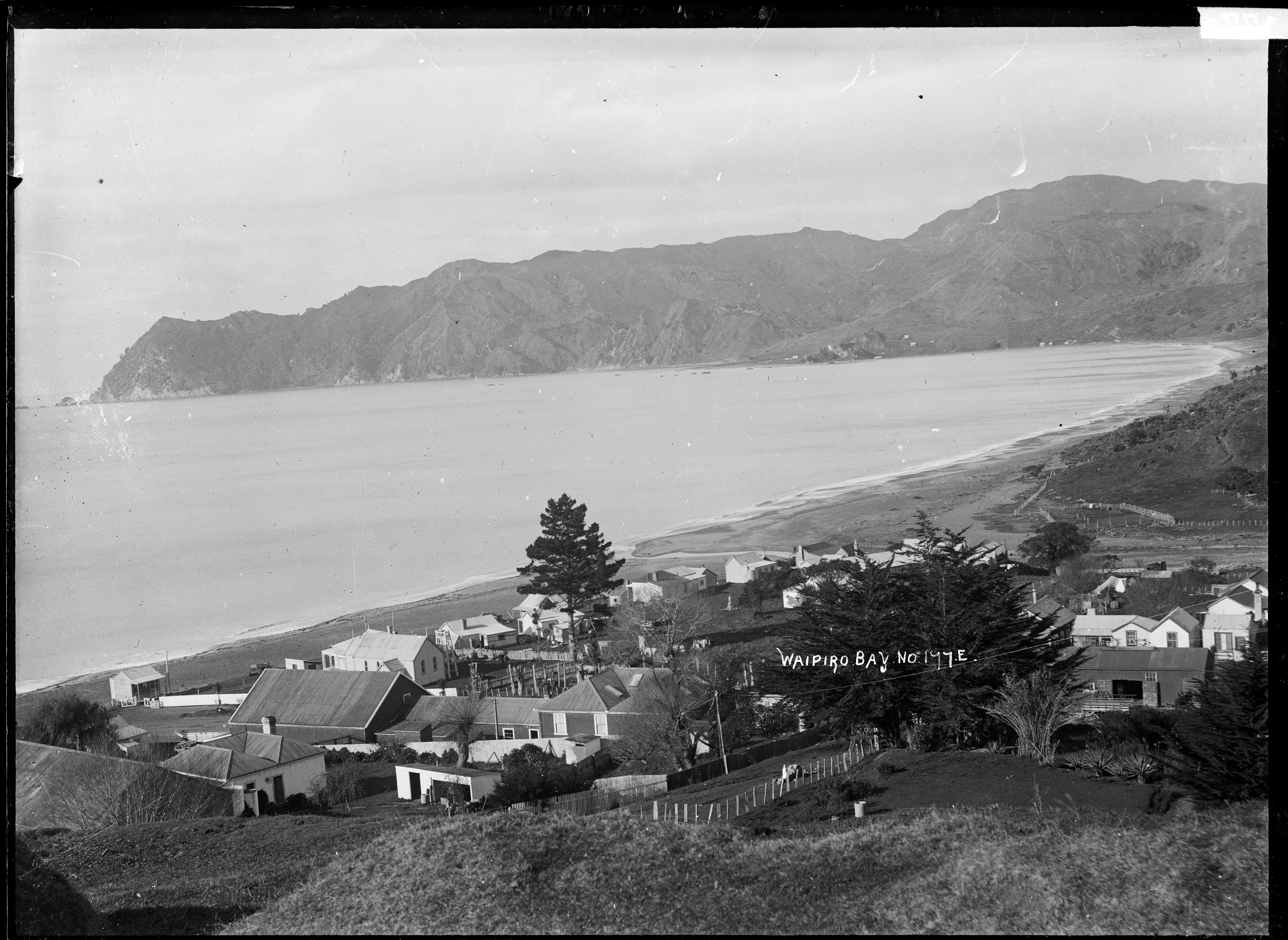
- Interactive map of Waipiro Bay
- Coordinates: 38°1′10″S 178°19′59″E
- Country: New Zealand
- Region: Gisborne District
- Ward: Tairāwhiti General Ward
- Electorates: East Cape; Ikaroa-Rāwhiti (Māori)

Government
  - Territorial authority: Gisborne District Council
  - Mayor of Gisborne: Rehette Stoltz
  - East Cape MP: Dana Kirkpatrick
  - Ikaroa-Rāwhiti MP: Cushla Tangaere-Manuel

Area
  - Total: 83.58 km^{2} (32.27 sq mi)

Population (2023 Census)
  - Total: 174
  - Density: 2.08/km^{2} (5.39/sq mi)
- Time zone: UTC+12 (NZST)
  - Summer (DST): UTC+13 (NZDT)
- Postcode: 4079
- Area code: 06

Waipiro Bay is a small coastal settlement in the Gisborne District on the East Coast of the North Island of New Zealand. The name also refers to the bay that the settlement is built on. It was named Waipiro by Chief Paoa, which translates literally to "putrid water", referring to the area's sulfuric properties. It is in the Waiapu ward, along with nearby towns Te Puia Springs, Tokomaru Bay, and Ruatoria. It is located 15 km (9 mi) south of Ruatoria, 77 km (48 mi) north-east of Gisborne, and 41 km (25 mi) south-west of the East Cape Lighthouse, the easternmost point of mainland New Zealand. By road, it is 103 km (64 mi) from Gisborne, and 231 km (144 mi) from Ōpōtiki. Waipiro Bay is governed by the Gisborne District Council, and is in the East Coast electorate.

At its peak in the 1900s to 1920s, Waipiro Bay was the largest town on the East Coast, with a population of up to 10,000 people. The town's size greatly diminished after a road was built bypassing the bay in the late 1920s, and as of 2011, there were only about 96 people (20 families) still living there.

During a predetermined season, the Gisborne District Council permits freedom camping in certain areas of the bay, which boasts good surfing, fishing and diving. Te Ara - the Encyclopedia of New Zealand calls Waipiro Bay "one of the most scenic of the coast localities".

== History and culture ==
=== Early history ===
The Māori had a settlement at Waipiro Bay, and were whaling from there in the mid-19th century.

For a while, nearby Akuaku was the hub of the area. However, by the late 19th century, Waipiro Bay had become the centre of a farming based community. A post office was built in 1885, and from the 1890s wool bales were being shipped out of the bay, while livestock, supplies, and equipment were being shipped in (usually for J. N. Williams's holdings). There is no harbour at Waipiro Bay, so goods and passengers had to be "surfed" between the shore and waiting ships on surfboats, lighters or rafts.

=== 20th century ===
In the early 20th century, a road was built to Waipiro Bay. Akuaku did not have a road, so its residents began moving to Waipiro Bay — the new "place to be". Eventually, the main highway north ran through Waipiro Bay, which made it a vital link between Gisborne and the rest of the East Coast. In the 1900s to 1920s, Waipiro Bay became the largest town on the East Coast, with a population of up to 10,000. As the town grew, it became host to the Waiapu County Council offices, a police station, a courthouse, a school, two hotels, a general store and a variety of other stores. Sir Robert Kerridge, founder of Regent Cinemas, established his first cinema in the town, and a maternity hospital was established by the Waiapu Hospital Board in a house originally built for Arthur Beale, J. N. Williams's accountant.

According to Te Ara - the Encyclopedia of New Zealand, a new road was constructed between Te Puia Springs and Kopuaroa in the late 1920s, bypassing the bay. However, according to a former resident of Waipiro Bay, Paora Kahu Carter, this road was not built until after she had moved to the town as a child in 1940. She remembers a thriving town, with a blacksmith, a cinema, a police station, a billiards bar, a hotel, a library, a bakery, a post office, two shops, and the Waipiro Trading Company. Regardless of when the road was built, it had a detrimental effect on the town. With road transport rapidly replacing sea transport, Waipiro Bay became isolated, and the town's shops and services moved to Te Puia Springs. By 2011, Waipiro Bay's population was about 1% of what it was during its peak.

=== Marae ===
The local marae, Iritekura Marae, is central to the community, and includes an historic church. It is a meeting place for the Ngāti Porou hapū of Te Whānau a Iritekura, and includes a meeting house of the same name.

Two other historic Ngāti Porou marae are also located north of the Waipiro Bay village: Taharora Marae and meeting house is a meeting place of the hapū of Ngāi Taharora; Kie Kie Marae and Hau meeting house is a meeting place of Te Whānau a Rākairoa and Te Whānau a Te Haemata.

In October 2020, the Government committed $5,756,639 from the Provincial Growth Fund to upgrade Iritekura, Taharora and 27 other Ngāti Porou marae. The funding was expected to create 205 jobs.

== Demographics ==
Waipiro Bay and its surrounds, including Takapau and Kōpuaroa, cover 83.58 km^{2} (32.27 sq mi). It is part of the Tokomaru statistical area.

Historical population
Year	Pop.	±% p.a.
2006	147	—
2013	153	+0.57%
2018	150	−0.40%
2023	174	+3.01%

Waipiro Bay had a population of 174 in the 2023 New Zealand census, an increase of 24 people (16.0%) since the 2018 census, and an increase of 21 people (13.7%) since the 2013 census. There were 93 males and 84 females in 66 dwellings. 1.7% of people identified as LGBTIQ+. The median age was 43.7 years (compared with 38.1 years nationally). There were 33 people (19.0%) aged under 15 years, 27 (15.5%) aged 15 to 29, 78 (44.8%) aged 30 to 64, and 36 (20.7%) aged 65 or older.

People could identify as more than one ethnicity. The results were 24.1% European (Pākehā), 96.6% Māori, and 10.3% Pasifika. English was spoken by 91.4%, and Māori by 50.0%. No language could be spoken by 3.4% (e.g. too young to talk). New Zealand Sign Language was known by 1.7%. The percentage of people born overseas was 1.7, compared with 28.8% nationally.

Religious affiliations were 55.2% Christian, 6.9% Māori religious beliefs, and 1.7% other religions. People who answered that they had no religion were 27.6%, and 8.6% of people did not answer the census question.

Of those at least 15 years old, 21 (14.9%) people had a bachelor's or higher degree, 72 (51.1%) had a post-high school certificate or diploma, and 48 (34.0%) people exclusively held high school qualifications. The median income was $26,400, compared with $41,500 nationally. 3 people (2.1%) earned over $100,000 compared to 12.1% nationally. The employment status of those at least 15 was 51 (36.2%) full-time, 15 (10.6%) part-time, and 9 (6.4%) unemployed.

== Education ==
Waipiro Bay had a local primary school called Te Kura Kaupapa Māori o Waipiro, a co-ed Māori language immersion school catering for students in Years 1–8. It opened in 1996 and closed in 2013.
