= Whai Ngata =

Māori broadcaster, journalist and lexicographer

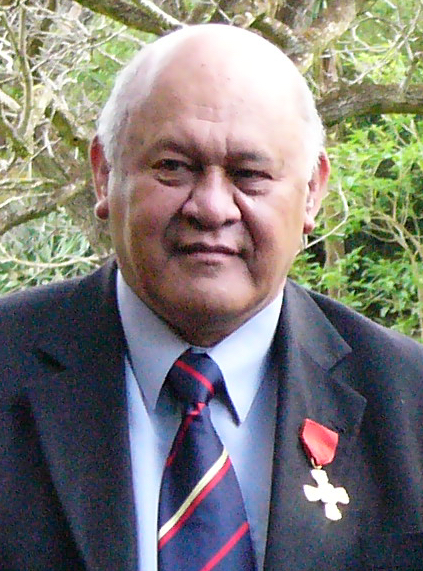
Ngata in 2007

Tanara Whairiri Kitawhiti "Whai" Ngata ONZM (c. 1942 – 3 April 2016) was a Māori broadcaster, journalist, and lexicographer.

Ngata worked for Radio New Zealand from 1975 to 1983, before moving to Television New Zealand. He led the Māori department at TVNZ until his retirement in 2008. He helped to write the English–Māori dictionary credited to his father Hōri Mahue Ngata, the grandson of Sir Āpirana Ngata.

In the 2007 Queen's Birthday Honours, Ngata was appointed an Officer of the New Zealand Order of Merit, for services to Māori broadcasting and television.

Ngata died in Auckland overnight on 2/3 April 2016. He is survived by his mother Mihihara Ngata (née Ngarimu), wife Geraldine and his three sons and their families.
