= Hōri Ngata =

Ngāti Porou farmer, railway worker, workers' camp supervisor, accountant, lexicographer

Hōri Mahue Ngata (8 August 1919 – 15 February 1989) was a New Zealand Ngāti Porou farmer, railway worker, workers’ camp supervisor, accountant, lexicographer. His parents were Mākarini Tānara Ngata, a farmer, who was the eldest son of Sir Āpirana Ngata, and Maraea Mereana Baker. He served in the 28th New Zealand (Maori) Battalion.

Ngata compiled an English–Māori dictionary, although he died before it was ready for publication. His son Whai Ngata, a broadcaster, completed the work, with the assistance of others, and it was published as English–Maori Dictionary by Learning Media Ltd in 1993. It was later published on the web at www.learningmedia.co.nz/ngata/ as the Ngata Dictionary.
