= Āpirana Ngata =

New Zealand politician and lawyer (1874–1950)

The Honourable Sir Āpirana Ngata
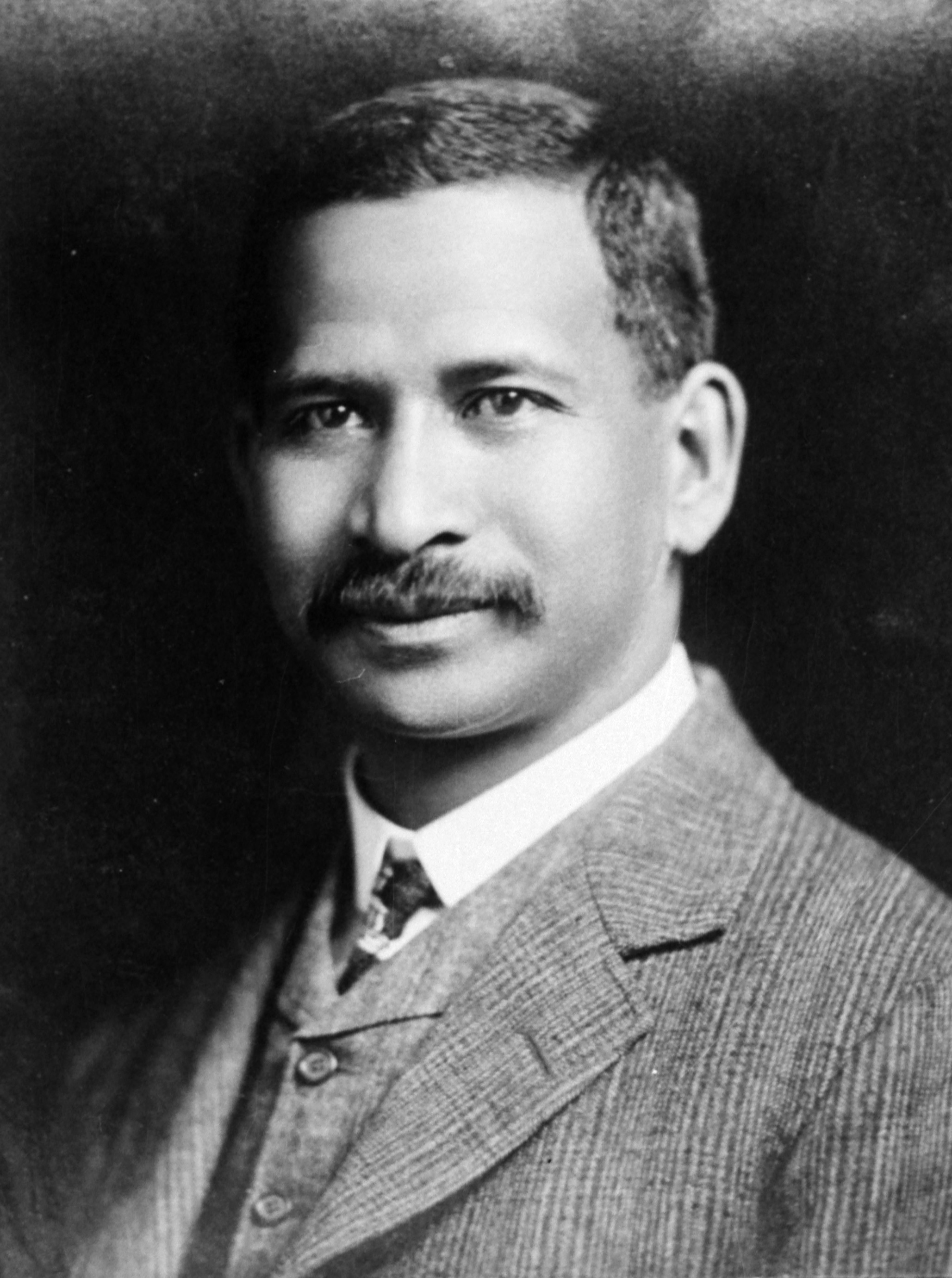
- Āpirana Ngata in 1905

22nd Minister of Native Affairs
- In office 10 December 1928 – 1 November 1934
- Prime Minister: Sir Joseph Ward; George Forbes
- Preceded by: Gordon Coates
- Succeeded by: George Forbes

Father of the Parliament
- In office 18 November 1929 – 30 August 1943
- Preceded by: Thomas Wilford
- Succeeded by: Peter Fraser

Member of the New Zealand Parliament for Eastern Maori
- In office 20 December 1905 – 25 September 1943
- Preceded by: Wi Pere
- Succeeded by: Tiaki Omana

Personal details
- Born: 3 July 1874 Te Araroa, New Zealand
- Died: 14 July 1950 (aged 76) Waiomatatini, New Zealand
- Party: Liberal; United; National
- Spouse: Arihia Kane Tamati (m. 1895; died 1929)
- Relatives: Paratene Ngata (father); Hēnare Ngata (son); Hōri Ngata (grandson); Whai Ngata (great-grandson)

Sir Āpirana Turupa Ngata (3 July 1874 – 14 July 1950) was a prominent New Zealand statesman. He has often been described as the foremost Māori politician to have served in parliament in the mid-20th century, and is also known for his work in promoting and protecting Māori culture and language. His legacy is one of the most prominent of any New Zealand leader in the 20th century, and is commemorated by his depiction on the fifty-dollar note.

Ngata practised as a lawyer before entering politics in 1897, when he established the Young Māori Party alongside numerous alumni of Te Aute College, including future fellow cabinet minister Māui Pōmare. Here he challenged the traditional views of his people, advocating the abandonment of some traditional practices and customary healing in favour of science and Pākehā-style sanitation, which made him a controversial figure. In 1905, he was elected the Liberal Member of Parliament (MP) for Eastern Maori, holding the seat for nearly 40 years.

He served in government as Minister of Native Affairs from 1928 to 1934. In this he tried to accomplish as many reforms for Māori as possible, although he was forced to resign as minister in a widely publicised spending scandal. Nevertheless, he continued to serve as MP for Eastern Maori until he was ousted in 1943 by Rātana candidate (affiliated with Labour) Tiaki Omana, as Labour swept the Māori electorates. At the age of 69 he returned to his Ngāti Porou home 129 kilometres north of Gisborne, where he lived with his four sons and four daughters, and multiple grandchildren, until his death seven years later.

== Early life ==
Ngata was born in Te Araroa (then called Kawakawa), a small coastal town about 175 km (109 mi) north of Gisborne, New Zealand. His iwi was Ngāti Porou. His father was Paratene Ngata, a tribal leader and expert in traditional lore, and his mother was Kāterina Naki, the daughter of an itinerant Scot, Abel Enoch. Ngata was greatly influenced both by his father and by his great-uncle Ropata Wahawaha (who had led loyal kūpapa Ngāti Porou forces against their Pai Mārire enemy (commonly known as Hauhau) in the East Cape War and later Te Kooti's escapees from the Chatham Islands). Ngata was raised in a Māori environment, speaking the Māori language, but his father also ensured that Ngata learnt about the Pākehā world, believing that this understanding would be of benefit to Ngāti Porou.

Ngata attended Waiomatatini Native School before moving on to Te Aute College until 1890. Ngata then went to Canterbury University College (now the University of Canterbury), where he studied for a Bachelor of Arts degree, awarded in 1893. From there he went to Auckland, where he took honours in political science in 1894. In 1895, he then took a law degree (LLB).

== First marriage and children ==
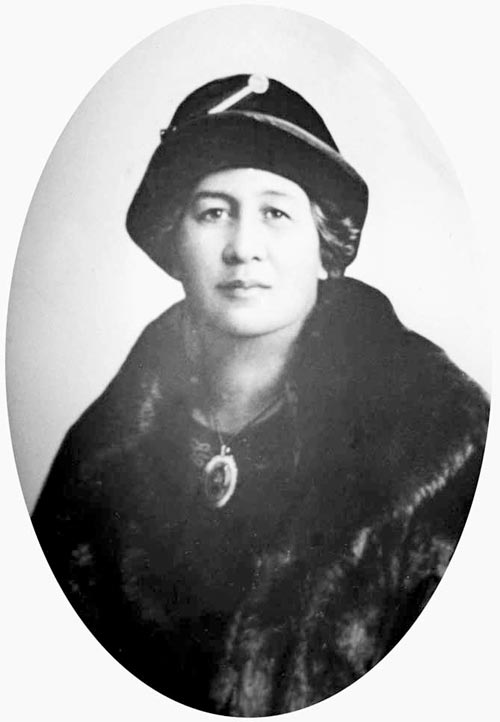
Arihia Ngata, Ngata's first wife

In 1895, a year before finishing his second degree (law), Ngata married 16-year-old Arihia Kane Tamati who was also of the Ngāti Porou iwi. Ngata had previously been engaged to Arihia's elder sister, Te Rina, but she died. Āpirana and Arihia had fifteen children, eleven of whom survived to adulthood: six girls and five boys.

Shortly after Ngata's legal qualifications were recognised, he and his wife returned to Waiomatatini where they built a house, initially called 'Te Wharehou' and later known as 'The Bungalow'. Ngata quickly became prominent in the community, making a number of efforts to improve the social and economic conditions of Māori across the country. He also wrote extensively on the place of Māori culture in the modern age. At the same time, he gradually acquired a leadership role within Ngāti Porou, particularly in the area of land management and finance.

== Political career ==
Ngata's first involvement with national politics came through his friendship with James Carroll, who was Minister of Native Affairs in the Liberal Party government. Ngata assisted Carroll in the preparation of two pieces of legislation, both of which were intended to increase the legal rights enjoyed by Māori. In the 1905 election, Ngata himself stood as the Liberal candidate for the Eastern Maori electorate, challenging the incumbent Wi Pere. Ngata was elected to Parliament.

=== Early career ===
New Zealand Parliament
Years	Term	Electorate	Party
1905–1908	16th	Eastern Maori	Liberal
1908–1911	17th	Eastern Maori	Liberal
1911–1914	18th	Eastern Maori	Liberal
1914–1919	19th	Eastern Maori	Liberal
1919–1922	20th	Eastern Maori	Liberal
1922–1925	21st	Eastern Maori	Liberal
1925–1928	22nd	Eastern Maori	Liberal
1928	Changed allegiance to:		United
1928–1931	23rd	Eastern Maori	United
1931–1935	24th	Eastern Maori	United
1935–1936	25th	Eastern Maori	United
1936–1938	Changed allegiance to:		National
1938–1943	26th	Eastern Maori	National

Ngata quickly distinguished himself in Parliament as a skilled orator. He worked closely with his friend Carroll, and also worked closely with Robert Stout. Ngata and Stout, members of the Native Land Commission, were often critical of the government's policies towards Māori, particularly those designed at encouraging the sale of Māori land. In 1909, Ngata assisted John Salmond in the drafting of the Native Land Act.

In late 1909, Ngata was appointed to Cabinet, holding a minor ministerial responsibility for Māori land councils. He retained this position until 1912, when the Liberal government was defeated. Ngata followed the Liberals into Opposition.

In the First World War, Ngata was highly active in gathering Māori recruits for military service, working closely with Reform Party MP Māui Pōmare. Ngata's own Ngāti Porou were particularly well represented among the volunteers. The Māori commitment to the war by some iwi, can be attributed to Ngata and Pōmare and this created a certain amount of goodwill from Pākehā towards iwi who had loyally supported the country; this assisted Ngata's later attempts to resolve land grievances.

Although in Opposition, Ngata enjoyed relatively good relations with his counterparts across the House in the Reform Party. He had a particularly good relationship with Gordon Coates, who became Prime Minister in 1925 and later Te Puea Hērangi of Waikato. The establishment of several government bodies, such as the Māori Purposes Fund Control Board and the Board of Māori Ethnological Research, owed much to Ngata's involvement.

==== Māori interests ====
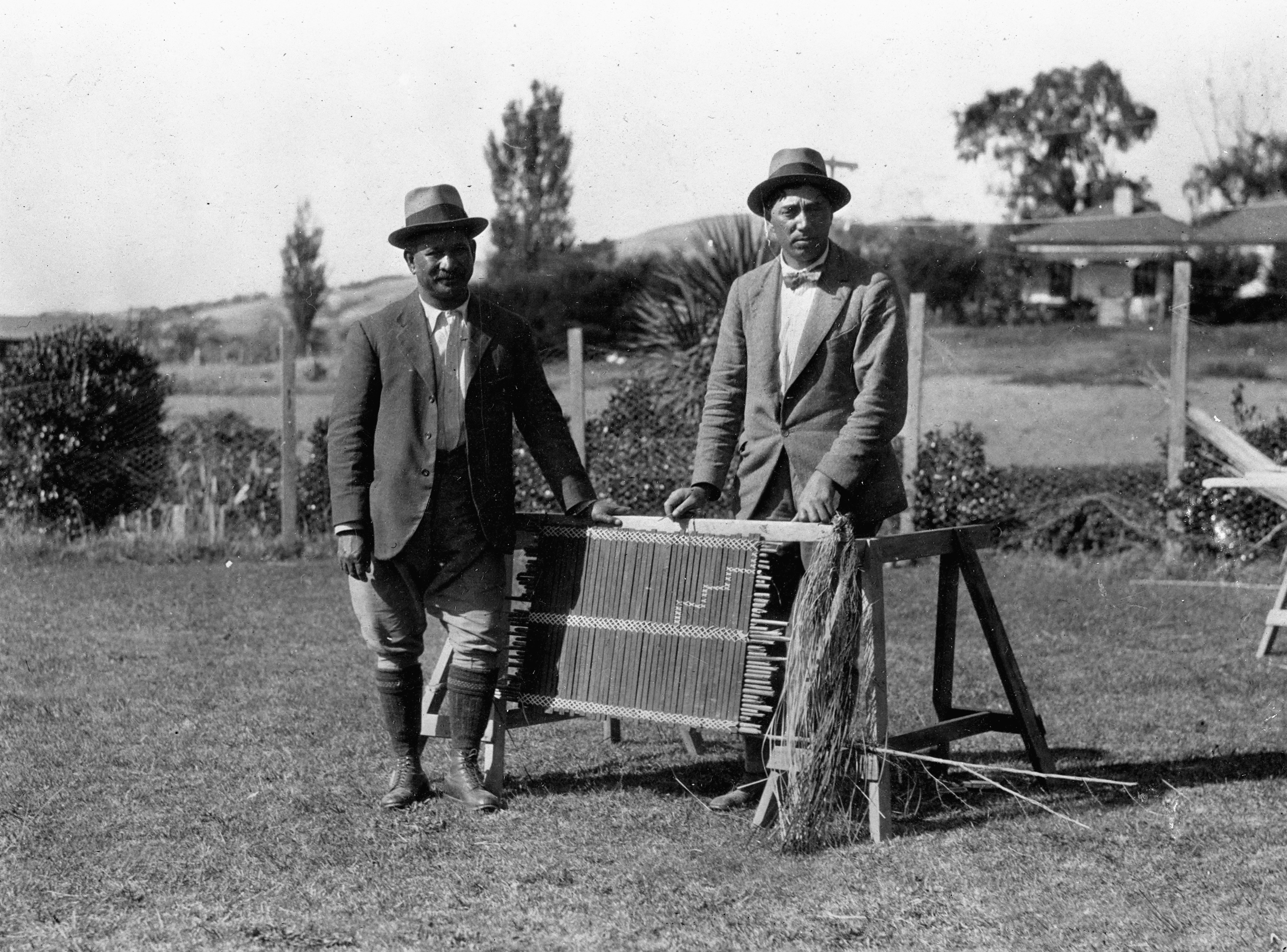
Ngata and Te Rangi Hīroa alongside a tukutuku panel at Ngata's home, during an expedition by Elsdon Best, James Ingram McDonald and Johannes Andersen.

Ngata was also active in a variety of other endeavours. The most notable, perhaps, was his involvement in academic and literary circles – in this period, he published a number of works on significant Māori culture, with Nga Moteatea, a collection of Māori songs, being one of his better known works. Ngata was also heavily involved in the protection and advancement of Māori culture among Māori themselves, giving particular attention to promoting the haka, poi dancing, and traditional carving that had been begun by Te Puea.

In 1926 Ngata spearheaded government legislation which established the School of Māori Arts that later became the New Zealand Māori Arts and Crafts Institute. The school was to preserve Māori arts and crafts amongst fears the skills and knowledge would be lost forever. One aspect of his advocacy of Māori culture was the construction of many new traditional meeting houses throughout the country.

Yet another of Ngata's interests was the promotion of Māori sport, which he fostered by encouraging intertribal competitions and tournaments. Finally, Ngata also promoted Māori issues within the Anglican Church in New Zealand, encouraging the creation of a Māori bishopric. In December 1928, Frederick Bennett, was consecrated as suffragan bishop to the Waiapu diocese with the title Bishop of Aotearoa. Ngata and Bishop Herbert Williams campaigned for the recognition of Māori language as a subject for study in the University of New Zealand, with the study of Māori becoming eligible for a degree of Bachelor of Arts in 1928.

Throughout all this, Ngata also remained deeply involved in the affairs of his Ngāti Porou iwi, particularly as regards land development. He was instrumental in establishing the land incorporation scheme whereby unused Māori land with multiple owners was amalgamated under a farm manager – often Pākehā – who developed and ran the farm. In government he was able to arrange for the transfer of four blocks of farm land to Te Puea and her husband. He arranged grants and government loans to help her develop farms for Waikato. He fired the Pākehā farm manager and replaced him with Te Puea. He arranged a car for her so she could travel around her estates. In 1934, during the depression, the public, media and parliament became alarmed at the large sums of money being gifted to Te Puea and others. A royal commission was held and Ngata was found guilty of irregularities in expenditure and negligence in administration, but no major scandals were unearthed. His land projects up to 1934 had involved the expenditure of £500,000, most of which was recoverable. Ngata resigned in December 1934. Ngata fought for higher living standards for the Māori people, and was very active during an economic depression in New Zealand in the Thirties, developing large farms which provided jobs and helped to restore the dignity of many Māori.

Ngata was knighted as a Knight Bachelor in the 1927 King's Birthday Honours, only the third Māori (after Carroll and Pōmare) to receive this honour.

==== Literary works ====
Ngata authored Ngā Mōteatea: He Maramara Rere No Nga Waka Maka / The Songs: Scattered Pieces from Many Canoe Areas, which was initially published in 1928 and translated by Pei Te Hurinui Jones. This work was selected for inclusion in Books of Mana as one of the 180 most significant works of Māori-authored non-fiction. Three more volumes were published in 1961, 1980 and 1990 posthumously.

Ngata's other book, The Price of Citizenship, published in 1943, was also included in Books of Mana.

=== Ministerial career ===
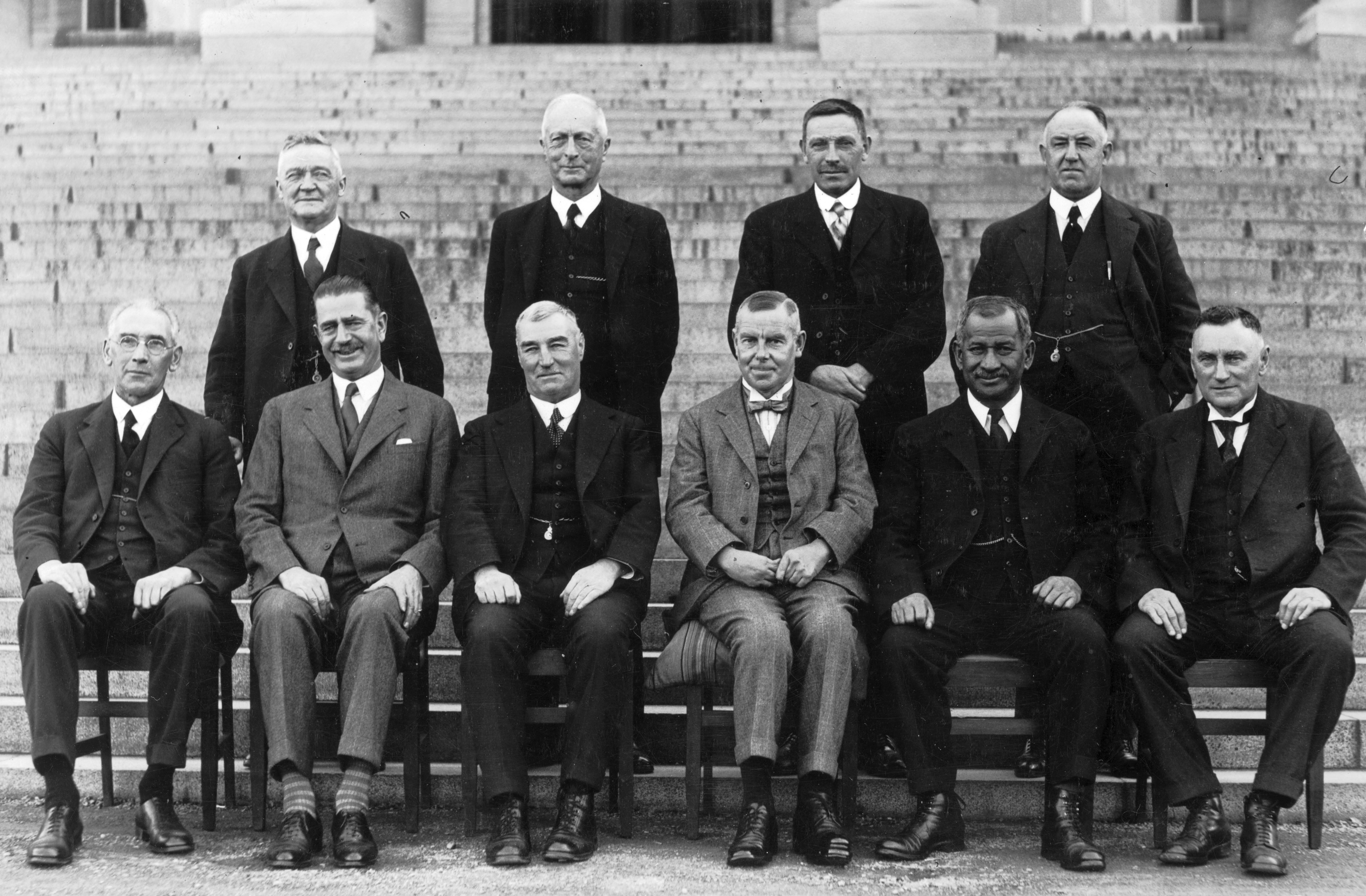
Coalition Cabinet of 1931. Ngata is seated on the front row, second from right.

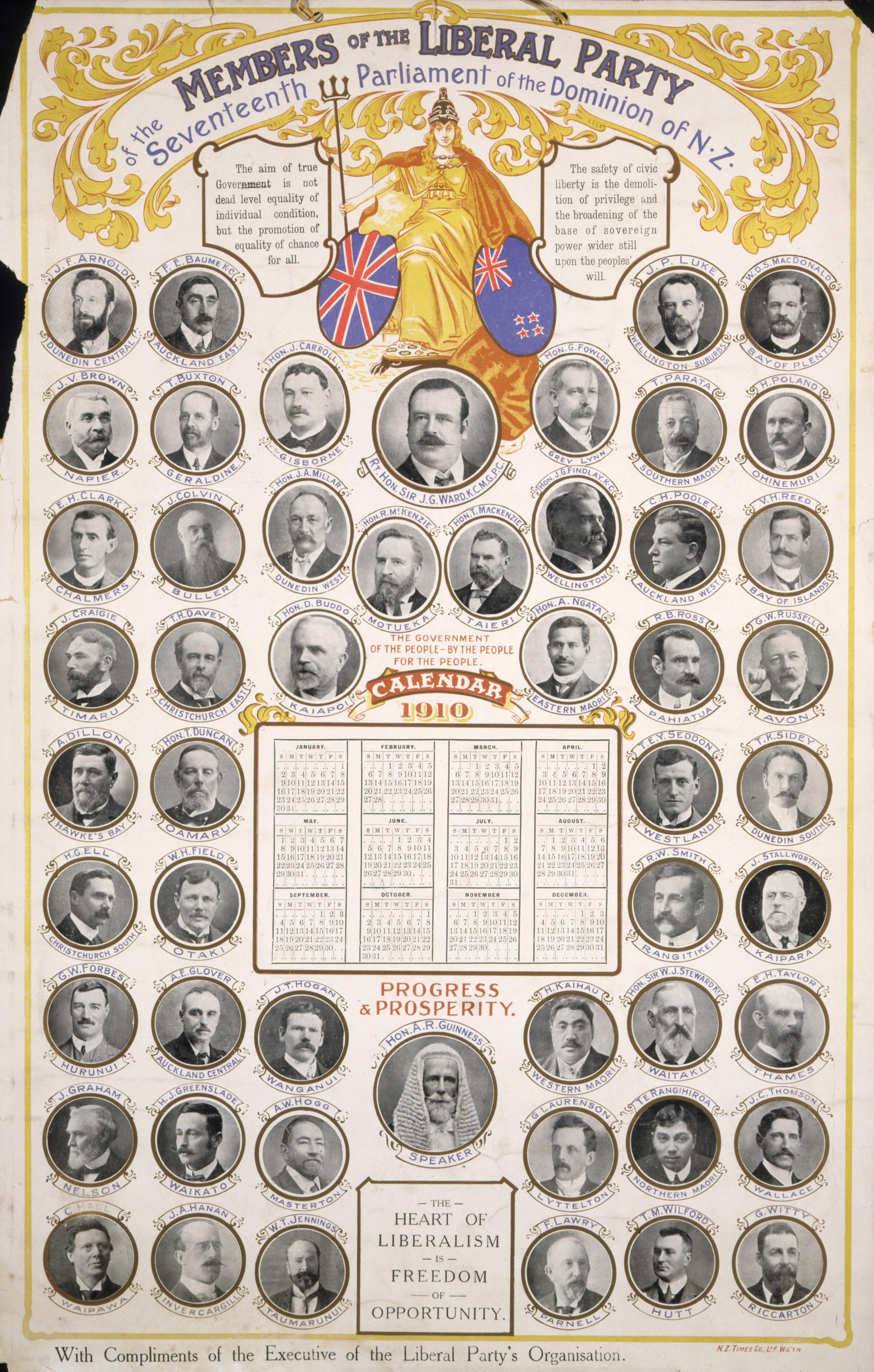
All 52 Members of the Liberal Party of the 17th parliament

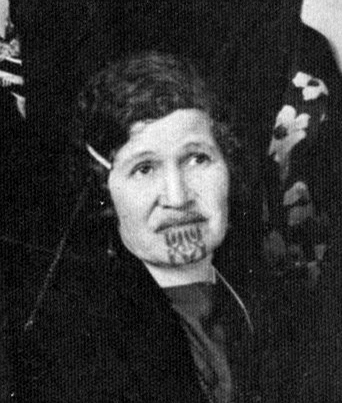
Te Rīringi, Ngata's second wife

In the 1928 election, the United Party (a rebranding of the old Liberal Party, to which Ngata belonged) won an unexpected victory. Ngata was returned to Cabinet, becoming Minister of Native Affairs. He was ranked third within Cabinet, and occasionally served as acting Deputy Prime Minister. Ngata remained extremely diligent in his work, and was noted for his tirelessness. Much of his ministerial work related to land reforms, and the encouragement of Māori land development. Ngata continued to believe in the need to rejuvenate Māori society, and worked strongly towards this goal.

In 1929, Ngata's wife Arihia Ngata and his eldest son Mākarini died of dysentery. After Arihia's death, Ngata married Te Rīringi Tūhou in 1932.

In 1932 Ngata and his Department of Native Affairs came under increasing criticism from other politicians. Many believed that Ngata was pressing ahead too fast, and the large amount of activity that Ngata ordered had caused organisational difficulties within the department. An inquiry into Ngata's department was held, and it was discovered that one of Ngata's subordinates had falsified accounts. Ngata himself was severely criticised for disregarding official regulations which he had often felt were inhibiting progress. It was also alleged that Ngata had shown favouritism to Ngāti Porou and Waikato, especially Te Puea and her husband Rawiri Tumokai Katipa. Bob Semple, a leading Labour politician, said the Royal Commission investigation showed one of the worst specimens of abuse of political power, maladministration, misappropriation of public funds as well as a betrayal of trust. Ngata, while denying any personal wrongdoing, accepted responsibility for the actions of his department and was dismissed from his ministerial position.

Māori leaders, such as Te Puea, were angry at Ngata for discrediting and embarrassing Māori.

== Later life and legacy ==
Although Ngata had resigned from Cabinet, he remained in Parliament. He was awarded the King George V Silver Jubilee Medal in 1935. In the 1935 election, the Labour Party was triumphant – Ngata went into Opposition, although the new Labour government retained many of his land reform programs. Ngata remained in Parliament until the 1943 election, when he was finally defeated by a Labour-Rātana candidate, Tiaki Omana. He had been a member of parliament for almost 38 consecutive years, breaking the previous record of 32 years set by James Carroll and coming close to Maurice O'Rorke overall record of nearly 39 years. Both marks were later surpassed by Rex Mason.

Ngata stood again for his seat in the 1946 election, but was unsuccessful. He remained involved in politics despite leaving Parliament. He gave advice on Māori affairs to both Peter Fraser (a Labour Prime Minister) and Ernest Corbett (a National Minister of Māori Affairs), and arranged celebrations of the Treaty of Waitangi's centenary in 1940. In the Second World War, he once again helped gather Māori recruits. On 22 June 1950, he was appointed to Parliament's upper house, the Legislative Council, but was too ill by this time to take his seat.

In 1948, Ngata's second wife, Lady Te Rīringi, died, and he married Hēne Te Kira not long before his own death.

On 7 May 1948, Ngata received an honorary doctorate in literature (LittD) from the Victoria College. At the same ceremony, his youngest son Hēnare graduated with a Bachelor of Arts.

Ngata died in Waiomatatini on 14 July 1950, following a brief illness, and was buried beside his first wife Lady Arihia behind their home 'The Bungalow' in Waiomatatini. He is remembered for his great contributions to Māori culture and language. His image has appeared on the New Zealand fifty-dollar note since 1999 along with Porourangi Meeting House, which is significant as it is located next to the original Ngata family home and Waiomatatini Marae, near Ruatoria.

Sir Āpirana and Lady Arihia Ngata guided the design of the St. Michael and All Angels' Chapel at Hukarere Girls College, and the chapel was consecrated on 1 November 1953.

Several schools have houses named after him, including Rangiora High School, Tauranga Boys' College, Rotorua Intermediate, Cashmere High School, Te Aute College (where Ngata went), Te Puke High School, Wainuiomata High School and Otumoetai Intermediate.

Ngata has inspired all sorts of politicians today, who follow his blend of progressive conservatism. As controversial as he was adulated, Ngata's legacy is still very complicated. While many have praised him for tireless work to promote the Māori language (especially in a white-based, right-wing political environment), others have criticised and even derided him for corruption, conservatism and not taking the views of all his iwi into account while making incredibly important decisions on his own.

In 1999, Ngata was posthumously inducted into the New Zealand Business Hall of Fame.

Composer Robert Wiremu's work Te Kai a Te Rangatira set to music speeches by several Māori leaders including Ngata. Written for baritone and chamber ensemble it was commissioned for the IO Festival Kaitaia.

== Family legacy ==
On 19 October 2009, Āpirana Ngata's last surviving daughter, Mate Huatahi Kaiwai (born Ngata), died at her residence at Ruatoria, East Cape, New Zealand, aged 94. She was interred next to her late husband Kaura-Ki-Te-Pakanga Kaiwai and her son Tanara Kaiwai at Pukearoha Urupā. In the 2004 New Year Honours she had been made a Companion of the Queen's Service Order (QSO) for community service.

Ngata's youngest son, Sir Hēnare Ngata, died on 11 December 2011 aged 93. He was Māori vice-president of the National Party from 1967 to 1969 and stood as the National Party candidate for Eastern Maori in 1969.

Ngata's grandson Hōri Mahue Ngata wrote a widely used Māori-English dictionary.

== Sources ==
- Binney, Judith (1995). Redemption Songs: A Life of Te Kooti Arikirangi Te Turuki. Auckland University Press.
- Fry, Plantagenet Somerset (1994). The Dorling Kindersley History of the World. Dorling Kindersley Ltd.
- Gustafson, Barry (1986). The First 50 Years : A History of the New Zealand National Party. Auckland: Reed Methuen. ISBN 0-474-00177-6.
- King, Michael (1977). Te Puea: A Biography. Auckland: Hodder and Stoughton. ISBN 0-340-22482-7.
- King, Michael (2003). Te Puea. Reed Publishing.
- Wilson, Jim (1985) [First ed. published 1913]. New Zealand Parliamentary Record, 1840–1984 (4th ed.). Wellington: V.R. Ward, Govt. Printer. OCLC 154283103.

New Zealand Parliament
Preceded by Wi Pere	Member of Parliament for Eastern Maori; 1905–1943	Succeeded by Tiaki Omana
