= Te Puia Springs =

Locality in Gisborne District, New Zealand

- Interactive map of Te Puia Springs
- Coordinates: 38.055°S 178.305°E
- Country: New Zealand
- Region: Gisborne District
- Ward: Tairāwhiti General Ward
- Electorates: East Cape; Ikaroa-Rāwhiti (Māori)

Government
  - Territorial authority: Gisborne District Council
  - Mayor of Gisborne: Rehette Stoltz
  - East Cape MP: Dana Kirkpatrick
  - Ikaroa-Rāwhiti MP: Cushla Tangaere-Manuel
- Time zone: UTC+12 (NZST)
  - Summer (DST): UTC+13 (NZDT)
- Postcode: 4079
- Area code: 06

Te Puia Springs is a village on the east coast of the North Island of New Zealand, located 103 km north of Gisborne.

Its population is estimated to be between 300 and 400 people. The village has a hospital and one shop. It has natural springs flowing throughout it, from hills in the Ngāti Porou area. The local people like to bathe in these springs, claiming that they have healing properties.

Much of the land around this area has not been developed and still remains bush land. As a result of this there remains a lot of native wildlife in this area, such as tirairaka or fantail, kererū, tūī, and many others.
