= Staggered elections =

Elections where only a part of the body is elected at a time

Staggered elections are elections where only some of the places in an elected body are up for election at the same time. For example, United States senators have a six-year term, but they are not all elected at the same time. Rather, elections are held every two years for one-third of Senate seats.

Staggered elections have the effect of limiting control of a representative body by the body being represented, but can also minimize the impact of cumulative voting. Many companies use staggered elections as a tool to prevent takeover attempts. Some legislative bodies (most commonly upper houses) use staggered elections, as do some public bodies, such as the United States Securities and Exchange Commission.

== Application in business ==
A staggered board of directors or classified board is a prominent practice in US corporate law governing the board of directors of a company, corporation, or other organization, in which only a fraction (often one third) of the members of the board of directors is elected each time instead of en masse (where all directors have one-year terms). Each group of directors falls within a specified "class"—e.g., Class I, Class II, etc.—hence the use of the term "classified" board. The work of the Shareholder Rights Project has had a significant effect on the number of classified boards on the S&P 500.

In publicly held companies, staggered boards have the effect of making hostile takeover attempts more difficult; however, they are also associated with lower firm value. When a board is staggered, hostile bidders must win more than one proxy fight at successive shareholder meetings in order to exercise control of the target firm. Particularly in combination with a poison pill, a staggered board that cannot be dismantled or evaded is one of the most potent takeover defenses available to U.S. companies.

In corporate cumulative voting systems, staggering has two basic effects: it makes it more difficult for a minority group to get directors elected, as the fewer directorships up for election requires a larger percent of the equity to win; and it makes takeover attempts less likely to succeed as it is harder to vote in a majority of new directors. Staggering may also however serve a more beneficial purpose, that is provide "institutional memory" — continuity in the board of directors — which may be significant for corporations with long-range projects and plans.

Institutional shareholders are increasingly calling for an end to staggered boards of directors—also called "declassifying" the boards. The Wall Street Journal reported in January 2007 that 2006 marked a key switch in the trend toward declassification or annual votes on all directors: more than half (55%) of the S&P 500 companies have declassified boards, compared with 47% in 2005.

== Use in legislative bodies ==
=== National ===
Chamber	Type	Classes	% of seats up per election			Length of term (years)	Method of staggering
Chamber	Type	Total	1	2	3	Length of term (years)	Method of staggering
Argentine Chamber of Deputies	Lower house	2	130 / 257	127 / 257		4	Every constituency has seats in both classes, with roughly half of the seats contested in each class individually
Argentine Senate	Upper house	3	24 / 72	24 / 72	24 / 72	6	Each constituency has all its seats in one class only
Australian Senate	Upper house	2	40 / 76	40 / 76		6^{[a]}	The six states ordinarily elect half of their 12 senators at each election, while the 4 senators representing the territories are elected at each election
Federal Senate (Brazil)	Upper house	2	54 / 81	27 / 81		8	Every constituency has seats in both classes, with two-thirds of the seats contested in class 1 and the remaining one-third in class 2
Senate of Chile	Upper house	2	23 / 43	20 / 43		8	Each constituency has all its seats in one class only
Senate of the Czech Republic	Upper house	3	27 / 81	27 / 81	27 / 81	6	Each constituency has all its seats in one class only
Senate (France)	Upper house	2	174 / 348	174 / 348		6	Each constituency has all its seats in one class only
Rajya Sabha (India)	Upper house	3	77 / 245	78 / 245	78 / 245	6	
House of Councillors (Japan)	Upper house	2	124 / 248	124 / 248		6	Every constituency has seats in both classes, with half of the seats contested in each class individually
Senate of Liberia	Upper house	2	15 / 30	15 / 30		9	Every constituency has seats in both classes, with half of the seats contested in each class individually
National Assembly (Nepal)	Upper house	3	19 / 59	20 / 59	20 / 59	6	Every constituency has seats in all three classes, with roughly a third of the seats contested in each class individually
Senate of Pakistan	Upper house	2	52 / 104	52 / 104		6	Every constituency has seats in both classes, with half of the seats contested in each class individually
Senate of the Philippines	Upper house	2	12 / 24	12 / 24		6	The Senate is elected nationwide at-large, with half of the seats contested in each class individually
United States Senate	Upper house	3	33 / 100	33 / 100	34 / 100	6	Every constituency has seats in two out of the three classes, with roughly a third of the seats contested in each class individually

- 6 years for state senators, 3 years for territory senators.
- In the Australian Senate, a double dissolution election can happen, where all seats are contested. The 4 Territory seats are contested at each election.
- Some chambers do not have all of its seats elected, such as in the Rajya Sabha where 12 seats are appointed by the president.
- By-elections (special elections) can be held concurrently with general elections, increasing the number of seats up in an election.

=== State ===
==== Argentina ====
12 of the 24 provincial legislatures have staggered elections:

- Buenos Aires: Chamber of Deputies and Senate
- Buenos Aires City: Unicameral legislature
- Catamarca: Chamber of Deputies and Senate
- Chaco: Unicameral legislature
- Corrientes: Chamber of Deputies and Senate
- Formosa: Unicameral legislature
- Jujuy: Unicameral legislature
- La Rioja: Unicameral legislature
- Mendoza: Chamber of Deputies and Senate
- Misiones: Unicameral legislature
- Salta: Chamber of Deputies and Senate
- San Luis: Chamber of Deputies and Senate

==== Australia ====
In the federal Senate, half of the Senate's 76 members are eligible for re-election every 3 years. All members elected from states have a six-year term staggered over two election cycles; senators elected from the ACT and the NT have 3 year terms only. These half-Senate elections are usually held in conjunction with an election of all members for the Federal House of Representatives. There are rare instances in which a Federal election is held for the all members of the House of Representatives and all the members of the Senate at once, this is called a double dissolution election.

Three of Australia's five State Legislative Councils use staggered elections:

- New South Wales Legislative Council
- South Australian Legislative Council
- Tasmanian Legislative Council

Local councils in Western Australia also have staggered elections.

==== India ====
All six Legislative councils of states have staggered elections:

- Andhra Pradesh Legislative Council
- Bihar Legislative Council
- Karnataka Legislative Council
- Maharashtra Legislative Council
- Telangana Legislative Council
- Uttar Pradesh Legislative Council

==== United States ====
27 of the State Senates in the United States have staggered elections:

- Alaska State Senate
- Arkansas State Senate
- California State Senate
- Colorado State Senate
- Delaware State Senate
- Florida State Senate
- Hawaii State Senate
- Illinois State Senate
- Indiana State Senate
- Iowa Senate
- Kentucky State Senate
- Missouri State Senate
- Montana State Senate
- Nebraska Legislature
- Nevada State Senate
- North Dakota State Senate
- Ohio State Senate
- Oklahoma State Senate
- Oregon State Senate
- Pennsylvania State Senate
- Tennessee State Senate
- Texas State Senate
- Utah State Senate
- Washington State Senate
- West Virginia State Senate
- Wisconsin State Senate
- Wyoming State Senate

=== Local ===
- Some local councils in the United Kingdom, although the Electoral Commission in England has recommended that councils standardise on a 4-yearly whole council election cycle.

== Historical usage ==
=== National ===
- General Council of Andorra (1867–1979)
- Chamber of Representatives and Senate of Belgium (1835–1919)
- Senate and Chamber of Deputies of Bolivia (1944–1964)
- Legislative Assembly of Costa Rica (1913–1948)
- Senate and Chamber of Representatives of Cuba (1902–1950)
- Landsting of Denmark (1915–1953)
- National Assembly of Ecuador (1945–1970, 1984–1998)
- National Congress of Honduras (until 1942)
- Chamber of Deputies of Luxembourg (1922–1951)
- House of Representatives (1849–1888) and Senate (1848–1983) of the Netherlands
- National Congress of Nicaragua (1912–1932)
- First Chamber of Sweden (1867–1970)

=== Local ===
- Andorra: communal councils (1867–1979)
- Argentina:
  - Legislature of Córdoba (until 2001)
  - Chamber of Deputies of Santa Cruz (until 1998)
  - Chamber of Deputies of Santiago del Estero (until 2002)
  - Legislature of Tucumán (until 1989)
- Belgium: municipal councils and provincial councils (1836–1914)
- Spain: municipal councils and provincial deputations (until 1923)
- Japan: prefectural assemblies (1878–1890s)

== See also ==
- Industrial organization
- Mergers and acquisitions
- Takeover, including hostile takeover
- United Kingdom company law
- United States corporate law
