= Casaretto =

Casaretto is a surname. Notable people with the surname include:

- Caroline Casaretto (born 1978), German field hockey player
- Enrique Casaretto (1945–2020), Peruvian footballer
- Giovanni Casaretto (1810–1879), Italian botanist and explorer
- Marcelo Casaretto (born 1967), Argentine politician
- Pietro Casaretto (1810–1878), Italian Benedictine monk
