= Bicameralism =

Legislature with two chambers

Bicameralism is the division of a legislature into two separate assemblies, known as chambers or houses; such a legislature is called bicameral. Bicameralism is distinguished from unicameralism, in which all members deliberate and vote as a single group. As of 2022, roughly 40% of the world's national legislatures are bicameral, while unicameralism represents 60% nationally and much more at the subnational level. Since the 1970s, the number of bicameral legislatures has increased significantly, following a period of decline in the early 20th century.

Often, the members of the two chambers are elected or selected by different methods, which vary from jurisdiction to jurisdiction. This can often lead to the two chambers having very different compositions of members.

Enactment of primary legislation often requires a concurrent majority—the approval of a majority of members in each of the chambers of the legislature. When this is the case, the legislature may be called an example of perfect bicameralism. However, in many parliamentary and semi-presidential systems, the house to which the executive is responsible (e.g. House of Commons of the UK and National Assembly of France) can overrule the other house (e.g. House of Lords of the UK and Senate of France) and may be regarded as an example of imperfect bicameralism. Some legislatures lie in between these two positions, with one house able to overrule the other only under certain circumstances.

== History of bicameral legislatures ==
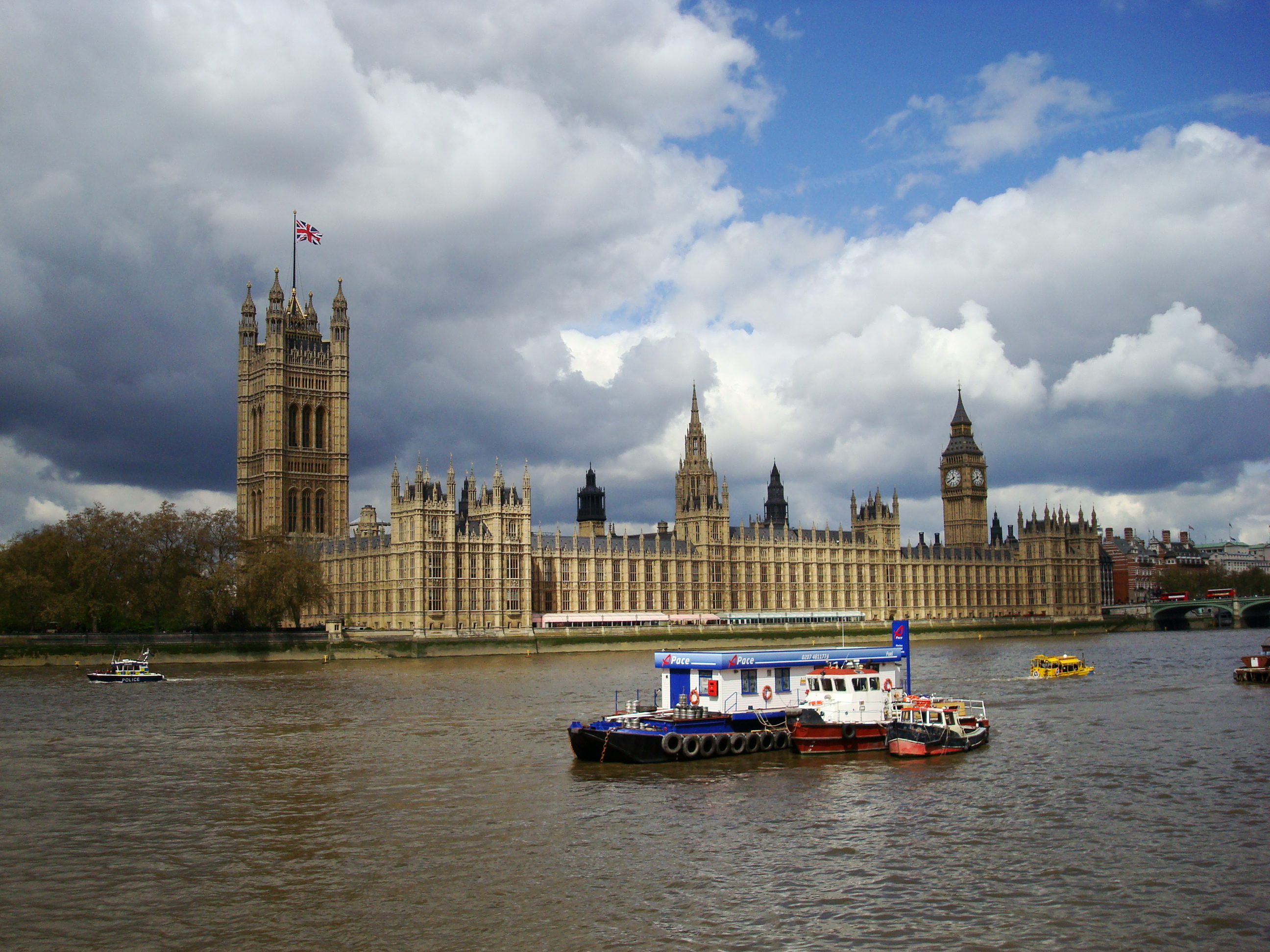
The Palace of Westminster, seat of the Parliament of the United Kingdom

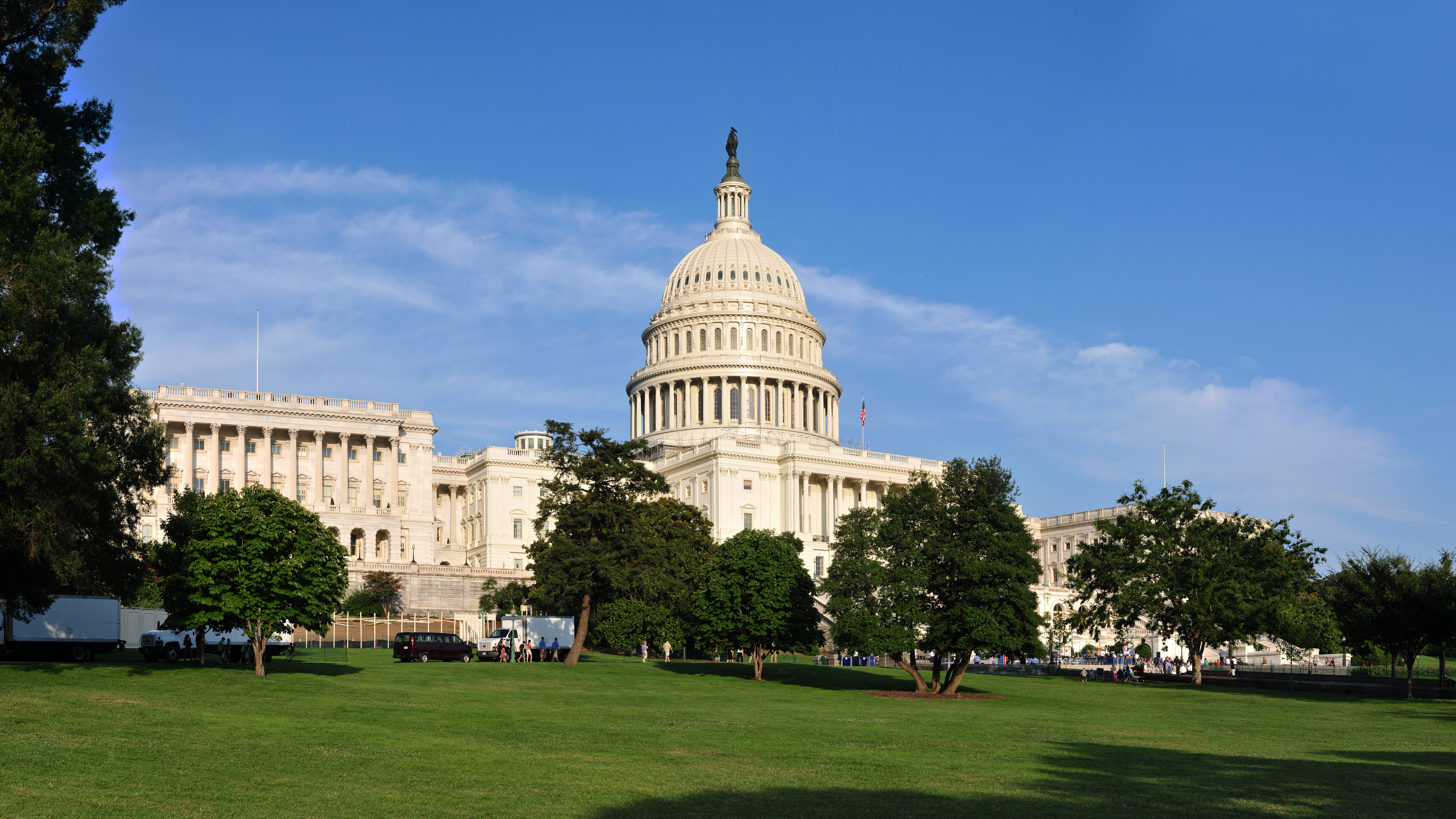
The United States Capitol, seat of the United States Congress

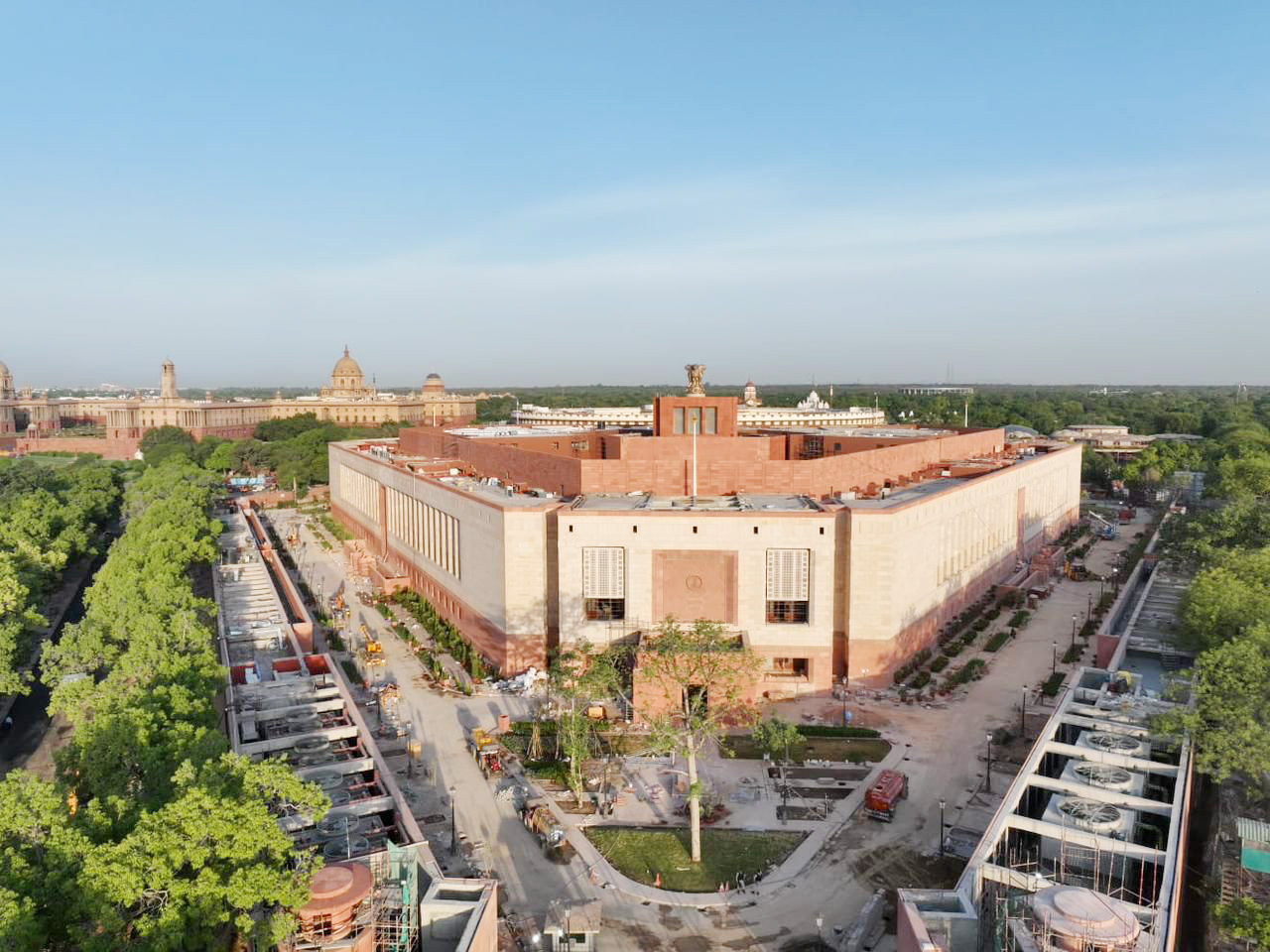
The New Sansad Bhavan, seat of the Parliament of India

=== Significance of the British Parliament ===
The British Parliament is often referred to as the "Mother of Parliaments" (in fact a misquotation of John Bright, who remarked in 1865 that "England is the Mother of Parliaments") because the British Parliament has been the model for most other parliamentary systems, and its Acts have created many other parliaments.

The origins of British bicameralism can be traced to 1341, when the Commons met separately from the nobility and clergy for the first time, creating what was effectively an Upper Chamber and a Lower Chamber, with the knights and burgesses sitting in the latter. This Upper Chamber became known as the House of Lords from 1544 onward, and the Lower Chamber became known as the House of Commons, collectively known as the Houses of Parliament.

=== Debate in the founding of the United States ===
The Founding Fathers of the United States also favoured a bicameral legislature. The idea was to have the upper chamber, the Senate, be appointed by the legislatures of the states unlike the lower chamber, the House of Representatives. Benjamin Rush noted, however, that "this type of dominion is almost always connected with opulence". The Senate was created to be a stabilising force, not elected by mass electors, but selected by the State legislators. Senators would be more knowledgeable and more deliberate—a sort of republican nobility—and a counter to what James Madison saw as the "fickleness and passion" that could absorb the House.

He noted further that "The use of the Senate is to consist in its proceeding with more coolness, with more system and with more wisdom, than the popular branch." Madison's argument led the Framers to grant the Senate prerogatives in foreign policy, an area where steadiness, discretion, and caution were deemed especially important. Accordingly, state legislators initially chose the Senate; this lasted until 1913, after which the 17th amendment required Senators be elected by popular vote. As part of the Connecticut Compromise, the Founding Fathers invented a new rationale for bicameralism in the context of federalism. The Senate would have exactly two delegates per state, and the House would have representatives by relative populations.

=== Rise of the Commonwealth ===
Many monarchies then followed, and to some degree emulated, the British "three-tier" model. In the 20th century, some countries in Europe and the Commonwealth abolished the monarchy and the upper house, although the trend towards abolishing upper houses has since halted. Often a largely ceremonial head of state who formally opens and closes parliament was introduced, a larger house representing the population, and a smaller house mostly representing the regions was established.

== Rationale for bicameralism and criticism ==
A formidable sinister interest may always obtain the complete command of a dominant assembly by some chance and for a moment, and it is therefore of great use to have a second chamber of an opposite sort, differently composed, in which that interest in all likelihood will not rule.

— Walter Bagehot, "The English Constitution" (1867), in Norman St John-Stevas, ed., The Collected Works of Walter Bagehot, London, The Economist, vol. 5, pp. 273–274.

Federal states have often adopted it as an awkward compromise between existing power held equally by each state or territory and a more democratic proportional legislature. For states considering a different constitutional arrangement that may shift power to new groupings, bicameralism could be demanded by currently hegemonic groups who would otherwise prevent any structural shift (e.g. military dictatorships, aristocracies).

The growing awareness of the complexity of the notion of representation and the multi-functional nature of modern legislatures may be affording incipient new rationales for second chambers, though these do generally remain contested institutions in ways that first chambers are not. An example of political controversy regarding a second chamber has been the debate over the powers of the Senate of Canada or the election of the Senate of France.

The relationship between the two chambers varies: in some cases, they have equal power, while in others, one chamber (the directly elected lower house with proportional representation) is clearly superior in its powers. The first tends to be the case in federal systems and those with presidential governments. The second tends to be the case in unitary states with parliamentary systems. Two streams of thought exist: critics believe bicameralism makes meaningful political reforms more difficult to achieve and increases the risk of gridlock—particularly in cases where both chambers have similar powers—while proponents argue the merits of the "checks and balances" provided by the bicameral model, which they believe help prevent ill-considered legislation.

== Communication between houses ==
Formal communication between houses is by various methods, including:

Sending messages
Formal notices, such as of resolutions or the passing of bills, usually done in writing, via the clerk and speaker of each house.
Transmission
of bills or amendment to bills requiring agreement from the other house.
Joint session
a plenary session of both houses at the same time and place.
Joint committees
which may be formed by committees of each house agreeing to join, or by joint resolution of each house. The United States Congress has conference committees to resolve discrepancies between House and Senate versions of a bill, similar to "Conferences" in Westminster parliaments.
Conferences
Conferences of the Houses of the English (later British) Parliament met in the Painted Chamber of the Palace of Westminster. Historically there were two distinct types: "ordinary" and "free". The British Parliament last held an ordinary conference in 1860—its elaborate procedure yielding to the simpler sending of messages. A free conference resolves a dispute through "managers" meeting less formally in private. The last free conference at Westminster was in 1836 on an amendment to the Municipal Corporations Act 1835; the previous one had been in 1740—with not much more success than ordinary conferences, the free type yielded to the greater transparency of messages. In the Parliament of Australia there have been two formal conferences, in 1930 and 1931, but many informal conferences. As of 2007 the "Conference of Managers" remains the usual procedure for dispute resolution in the Parliament of South Australia. In the Parliament of New South Wales in 2011, the Legislative Assembly requested a free conference with the Legislative Council over a bill on graffiti; after a year the Council refused, describing the mechanism as archaic and inappropriate. The two houses of the Parliament of Canada have also used conferences, but not since 1947 (although they retain the option).

== Examples of bicameralism at the national level ==
=== Federal ===
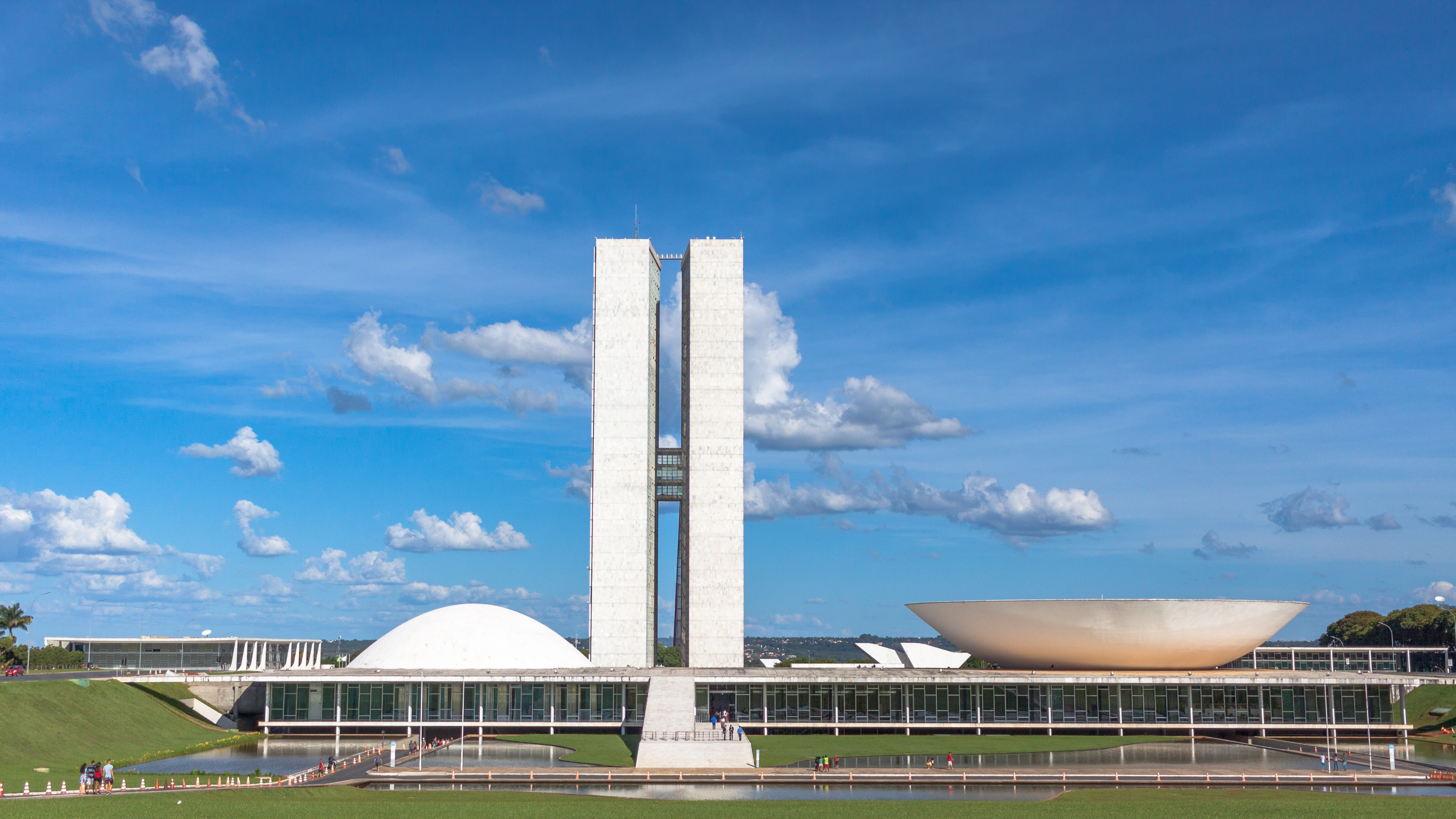
The National Congress of Brazil, seat of the Chamber of Deputies and the Federal Senate

Some countries, such as Argentina, Australia, Austria, Belgium, Bosnia and Herzegovina, Brazil, Canada, Germany, India, Malaysia, Mexico, Nepal, Nigeria, Pakistan, Russia, Switzerland, and the United States, link their bicameral systems to their federal political structure.

In the United States, Australia, Mexico, Brazil, and Nepal for example, each state or province is given the same number of seats in one of the houses of the legislature, despite variance between the populations of the states or provinces.

==== Australia ====
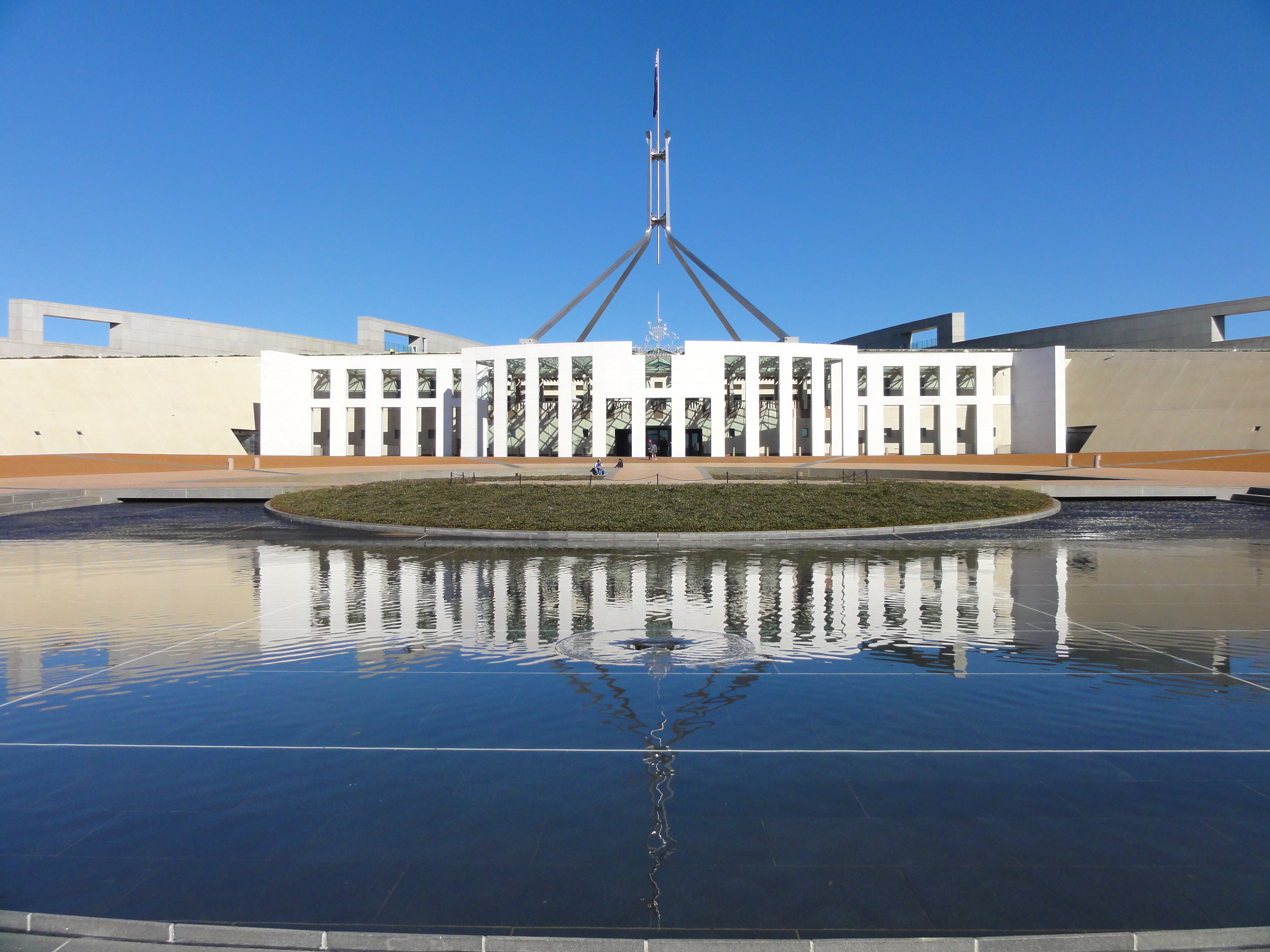
The federal bicameral Parliament of Australia, which contains a House of Representatives and a Senate

The bicameral Parliament of Australia consists of two Houses: the lower house is called the House of Representatives and the upper house is named the Senate. As of 31 August 2017, the lower house has 151 members, each elected from single-member constituencies, known as electoral divisions (commonly referred to as "electorates" or "seats") using full-preference instant-runoff voting. This tends to lead to the chamber being dominated by two major groups, the Liberal/National Coalition and the Labor Party. The government of the day must achieve the confidence of this House to gain and hold power.

The upper house, the Senate, is also popularly elected, under the single transferable vote system of proportional representation. There are a total of 76 senators: 12 senators are elected from each of the 6 Australian states (regardless of population) and 2 from each of the 2 autonomous internal territories (the Australian Capital Territory and the Northern Territory). This makes the total number 76, i.e. 6×12 + 2×2.

In many respects, Australia is a unique hybrid with influences from the United States Constitution, as well as from the traditions and conventions of the Westminster system and some indigenous features. Australia is exceptional in this sense because the government faces a fully elected upper house, the Senate, which must be willing to pass all its legislation. Although only the lower house, the House of Representatives, can hold a no-confidence vote against the government, in practice the support of the Senate is also necessary in order to govern. The Senate maintains the ability similar to that held by the British House of Lords, prior to the enactment of the Parliament Act 1911, to block supply against the government of the day. A government that is unable to obtain supply can be dismissed by the governor-general: however, this is generally considered a last resort and is a highly controversial decision to take, given the conflict between the traditional concept of confidence as derived from the lower house and the ability of the Senate to block supply (see 1975 Australian constitutional crisis). Many political scientists have held that the Australian system of government was consciously devised as a blend or hybrid of the Westminster and the United States systems of government, especially since the Australian Senate is a powerful upper house like the U.S. Senate; this notion is expressed in the nickname "the Washminster mutation".

Unlike upper houses in most Westminster parliamentary systems, the Australian Senate is vested with significant power, including the capacity to block legislation initiated by the government in the House of Representatives. This block can however be overridden in a joint sitting after a double dissolution election, at which the House of Representatives has the dominant numbers. As a result of proportional representation, the chamber features a multitude of parties vying for power. The governing party in the lower house rarely has a majority in the Senate, and so generally needs to negotiate with other parties and independents to get legislation passed.

This variant of bicameralism has also been further explored by Tarunabh Khaitan, who coined the phrase "Moderated Parliamentarism" to describe a parliamentary system with several distinctive features: mixed bicameralism, moderated (but distinct) electoral systems for each chamber, weighted multipartisanship, asynchronous electoral schedules, and deadlock resolution through conference committees.

==== Canada ====
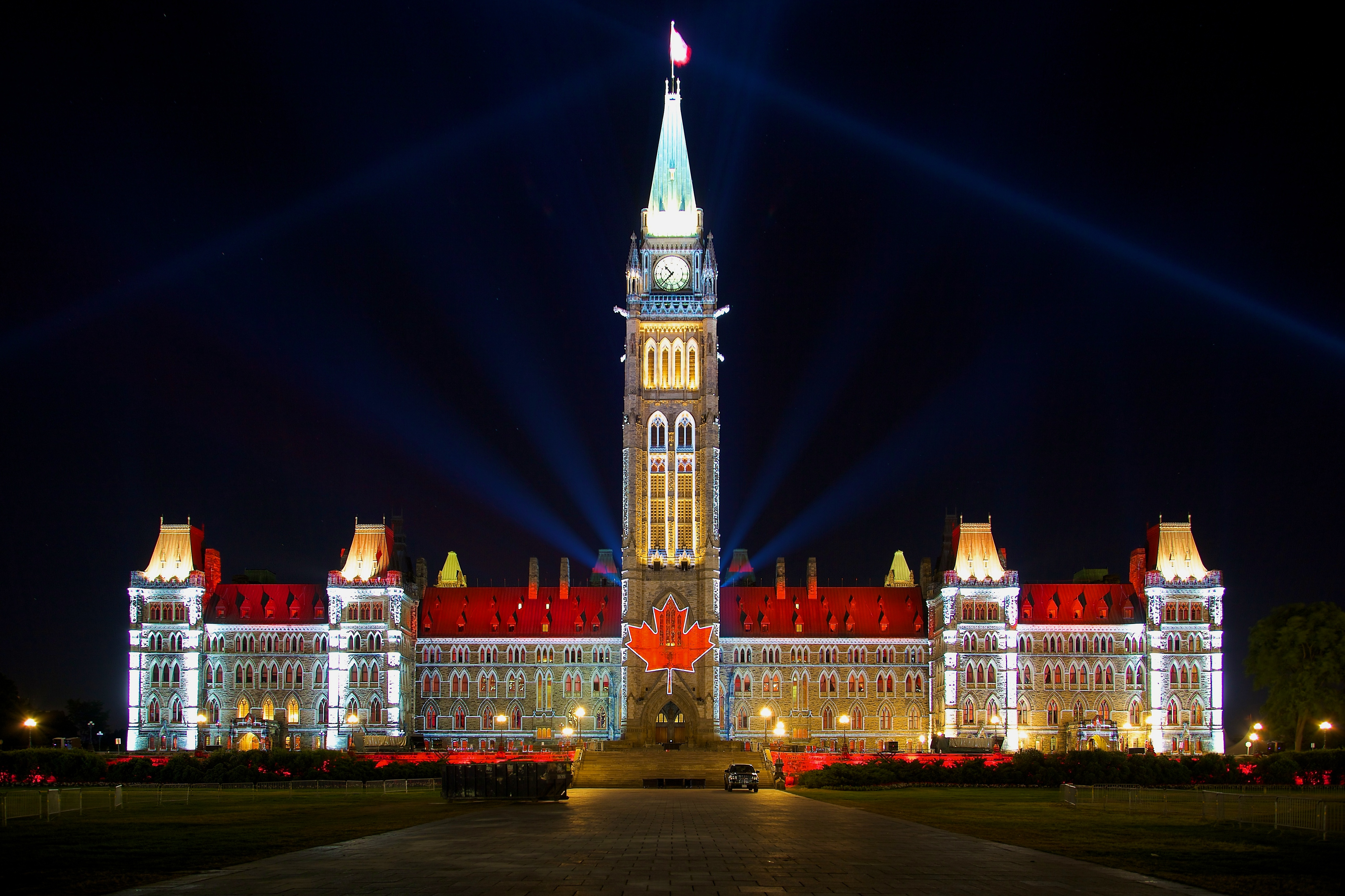
The federal bicameral Parliament of Canada, which contains a House of Commons and a Senate

Canada's elected lower house, the House of Commons, comprises Members of Parliament (MPs) from single-member "ridings" based mainly on population (updated every 10 years using Census data). The Commons is democratically elected every four years (constitutionally up to five years). In contrast, in Canada's upper house, Senators are appointed to serve until age 75 by the Governor General on the advice of the Prime Minister through an Independent Advisory Board as of 2016.

The government (i.e. executive) is responsible to and must maintain the confidence of the elected House of Commons. Although the two chambers formally have many of the same powers, this accountability clearly makes the Commons dominant—determining which party is in power, approving its proposed budget, and (largely) the laws enacted. The Senate primarily acts as a chamber of revision: it rarely rejects bills passed by the Commons but does regularly amend them; such amendments respect each bill's purpose, so they are usually acceptable to the Commons. The Senate's power to investigate issues of concern to Canada can raise their profile (sometimes sharply) on voters' political agendas.

==== Others ====
In German, Indian, and Pakistani systems, the upper houses (the Bundesrat, the Rajya Sabha, and the Senate respectively) are even more closely linked with the federal system, being appointed or elected directly by the governments or legislatures of each German or Indian state, or Pakistani province. This was also the case in the United States before the Seventeenth Amendment was adopted. Because of this coupling to the executive branch, German legal doctrine does not treat the Bundesrat as the second chamber of a bicameral system formally. Rather, it sees the Bundesrat and the Bundestag as independent constitutional bodies. Only the directly elected Bundestag is considered the parliament. In the German Bundesrat, the various Länder have between three and six votes; thus, while the less populated states have a lower weight, they still have a stronger voting power than would be the case in a system based proportionately on population, as the most populous Land currently has about 27 times the population of the least populous. The Indian upper house does not have the states represented equally, but on the basis of their population.

There is also bicameralism in countries that are not federations, but have upper houses with representation on a territorial basis. For example, in South Africa, the National Council of Provinces (and before 1997, the Senate) has its members chosen by each province's legislature.

In Spain, the Senate functions as a de facto territorially based upper house, and there has been some pressure from the Autonomous Communities to reform it into a strictly territorial chamber.

The European Union maintains a somewhat close to bicameral legislative system consisting of the European Parliament, which is elected in elections on the basis of universal suffrage, and the Council of the European Union, which consists of one representative for each government of member countries, who are competent for a relevant field of legislation. Though the European Union has a highly unusual character in terms of legislature, one could say that the closest point of equivalency lies within bicameral legislatures. The European Union is considered neither a country nor a state, but it enjoys the power to address national Governments in many areas.

=== Aristocratic and post-aristocratic ===
In a few countries, bicameralism involves the juxtaposition of democratic and aristocratic elements.

==== House of Lords of the United Kingdom ====
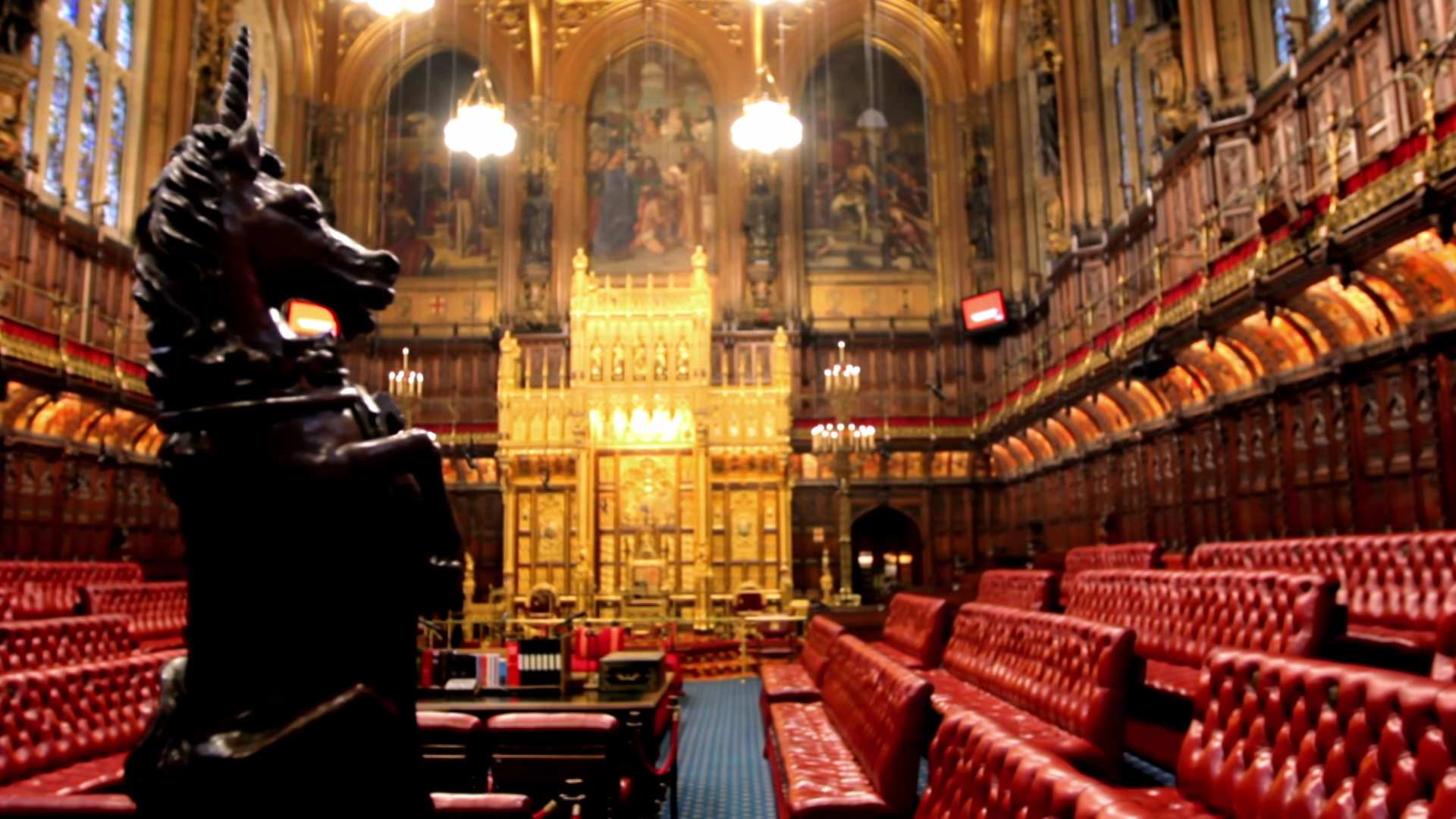
The House of Lords chamber

The best known example is the British House of Lords, which includes a number of hereditary peers. The House of Lords is a vestige of the aristocratic system that once predominated in British politics, while the other house, the House of Commons, is entirely elected. Over the years, some have proposed reforms to the House of Lords, some of which have been at least partly successful. The House of Lords Act 1999 limited the number of hereditary peers (as opposed to life peers, appointed by the Monarch on the advice of the Prime Minister) to 92, down from around 700. Of these 92, one is the Earl Marshal, a hereditary office always held by the Duke of Norfolk, one is the Lord Great Chamberlain, a hereditary office held by turns, currently by Baron Carrington, and the other 90 are elected by all sitting peers. Hereditary peers elected by the House to sit as representative peers sit for life; when a representative peer dies, there is a by-election to fill the vacancy. The power of the House of Lords to block legislation is curtailed by the Parliament Acts 1911 and 1949. Peers can introduce bills, except money bills, and all legislation must be passed by both houses of Parliament. If not passed within two sessions, the House of Commons can override the Lords' delay by invoking the Parliament Act. Certain legislation, however, must be approved by both houses without being forced by the Commons under the Parliament Act. These include any bill that would extend the time length of a Parliament, private bills, bills sent to the House of Lords less than one month before the end of a session, and bills that originated in the House of Lords.

Life peers are appointed either by recommendation of the Appointment Commission (the independent body that vets non-partisan peers, typically from academia, business or culture) or by Dissolution Honours, which take place at the end of every Parliamentary term when leaving MPs may be offered a seat to keep their institutional memory. It is traditional to offer a peerage to every outgoing Speaker of the House of Commons.

Further reform of the Lords has been proposed, however, no proposed reforms have been able to achieve public consensus or government support. Members of the House of Lords all have an aristocratic title or are from the clergy. Twenty-six archbishops and bishops of the Church of England sit as Lords Spiritual (the Archbishop of Canterbury, Archbishop of York, the Bishop of London, the Bishop of Durham, the Bishop of Winchester and the next 21 longest-serving bishops). It is usual that retiring archbishops, and certain other bishops, are appointed to the Crossbenches and given a life peerage.

Until 2009, 12 Lords of Appeal in Ordinary sat in the House as the highest court in the land; they subsequently became justices of the newly created Supreme Court of the United Kingdom. As of 16 February 2021, 803 people sit in the House of Lords, with 92 hereditary peers, 26 Lords Spiritual and 685 life peers. Membership is not fixed and decreases only on the death, retirement or resignation of a peer.

==== Japan's former House of Peers ====
Another example of aristocratic bicameralism was the Japanese House of Peers, abolished after World War II and replaced with the present House of Councillors.

=== Unitary states ===
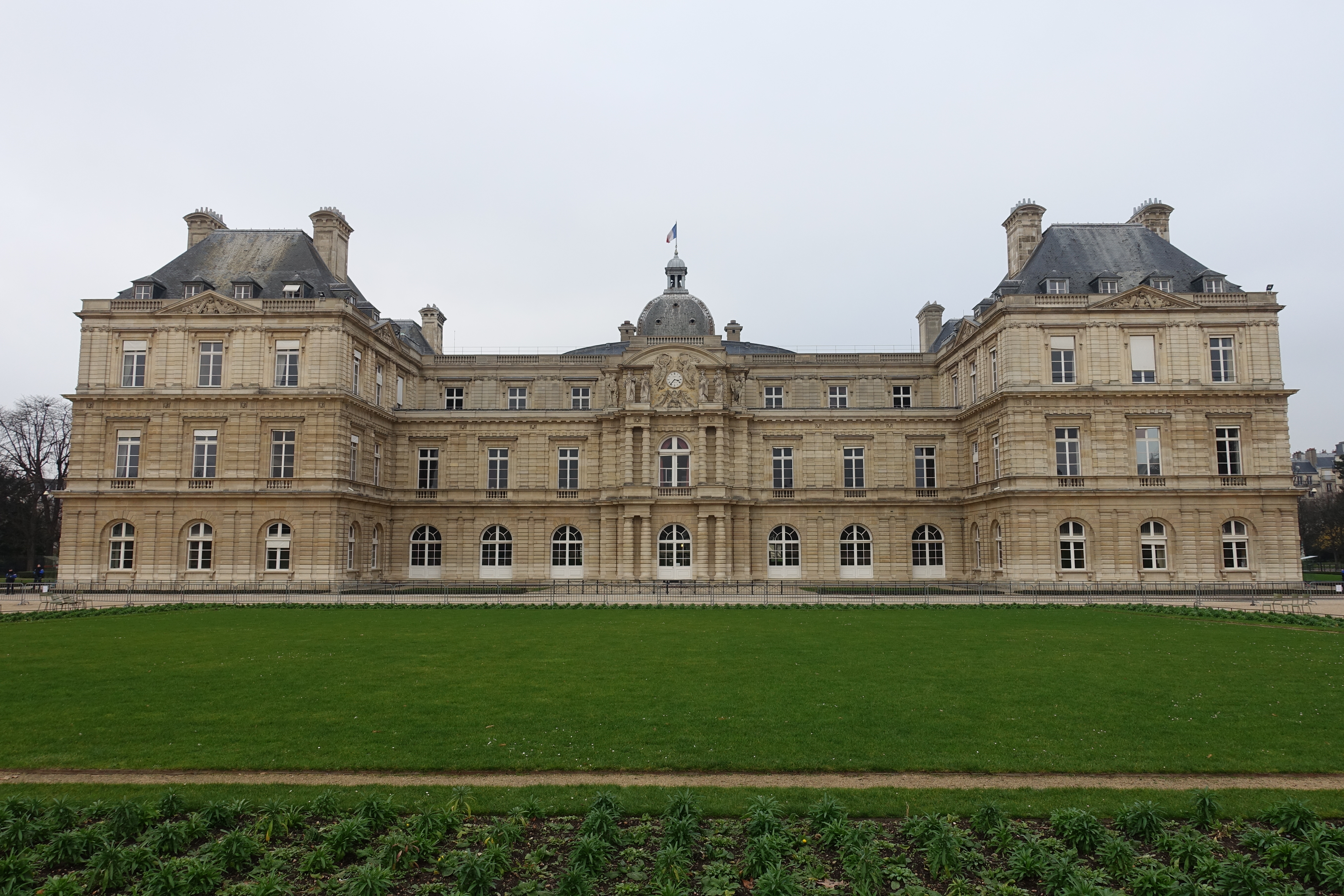
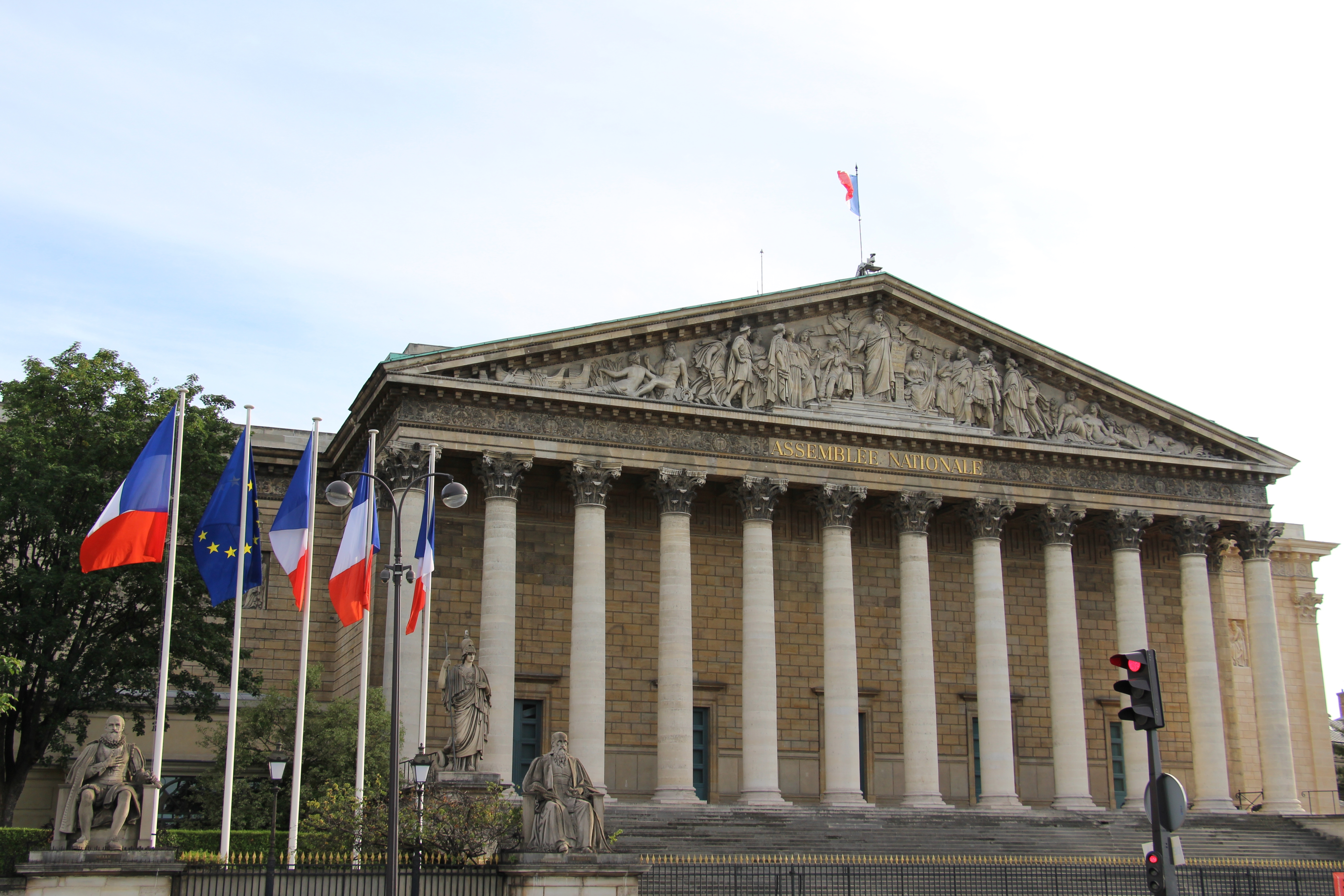
Some bicameral legislatures have chambers that meet in different buildings, at different parts of the city. Here, France's upper house called the Senate meet in the Luxembourg Palace (top), while the lower house, the National Assembly, meets at the Palais Bourbon (bottom).

Many unitary states like Italy, France, the Netherlands, the Philippines, the Czech Republic, the Republic of Ireland and Romania have bicameral systems. In countries such as these, the upper house generally focuses on scrutinizing and possibly vetoing the decisions of the lower house.

==== Italian Parliament ====
On the other hand, in Italy the Parliament consists of two chambers that have the same role and power: the Senate (Senate of the Republic, commonly considered the upper house) and the Chamber of Deputies (considered the lower house). The main difference among the two chambers is the way the two chambers are composed: the deputies, in fact, are elected on a nationwide basis, whilst the members of the Senate are elected on a regional basis: this may lead to different majorities among the two chambers because, for example, a party may be the first nationally but second or third in some regions. Considering that in the Italian Republic the Government needs to win confidence votes in both the chambers, it may happen that a Government has a strong majority (usually) in the Chamber of Deputies and a weak one (or no majority at all) in the Senate. This has led sometimes to legislative deadlocks, and has caused instability in the Italian Government.

==== Indirectly elected upper houses (France, Ireland, Netherlands) ====
In some of these countries, the upper house is indirectly elected. Members of France's Senate and Ireland's Seanad Éireann are chosen by electoral colleges. In Ireland, it consists of members of the lower house, local councillors, the Taoiseach, and graduates of selected universities, while the Netherlands' Senate is chosen by members of provincial assemblies (who, in turn, are directly elected).

==== Semi-bicameral (Hong Kong, Northern Ireland; earlier in Norway, the Netherlands) ====
In Hong Kong, members of the unicameral Legislative Council returned from the democratically elected geographical constituencies and partially democratic functional constituencies are required to vote separately since 1998 on motions, bills or amendments to government bills not introduced by the government. The passage of these motions, bills or amendments to government motions or bills requires double majority in both groups simultaneously. (Before 2004, when elections to the Legislative Council from the Election Committee was abolished, members returned through the Election Committee vote with members returned from geographical constituencies.) The double majority requirement does not apply to motions, bills and amendments introduced by the government.

Another similar situation are cross-community votes in Northern Ireland when the petition of concern procedure is invoked.

Norway had a kind of semi-bicameral legislature with two chambers, or departments, within the same elected body, the Storting. These were called the Lagting and the Odelsting, and were abolished after the general election of 2009. According to Morten Søberg, there was a related system in the 1798 constitution of the Batavian Republic.

== Examples of bicameralism in subnational entities ==
In some countries with federal systems, individual states (like those of the United States, Argentina, Australia and India) may also have bicameral legislatures. A few such states as or were Nebraska in the U.S., Queensland in Australia, Bavaria in Germany, and Tucumán and Córdoba in Argentina have later adopted unicameral systems. (Brazilian states and Canadian provinces all abolished upper houses).

=== Argentina ===
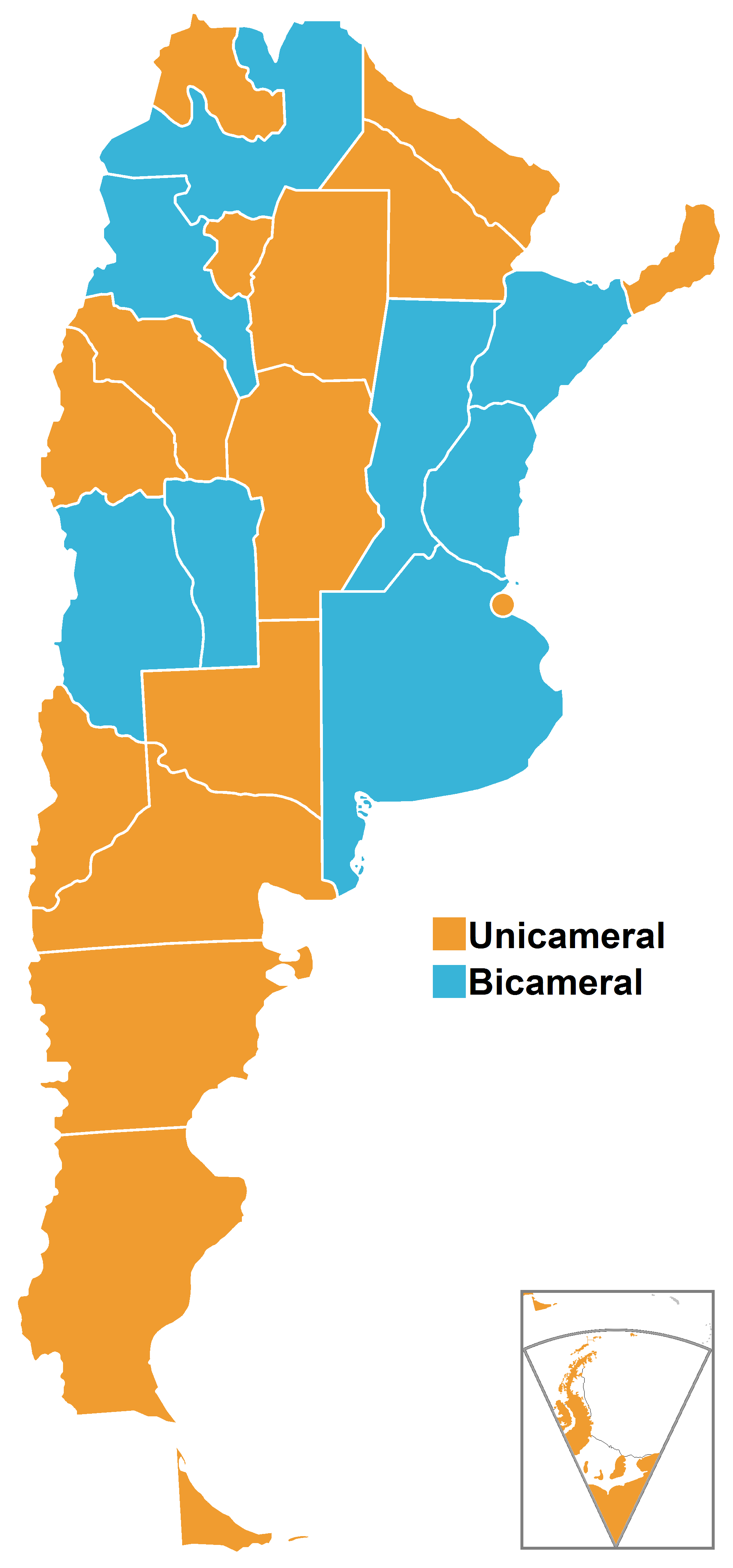
Provincial legislatures in Argentina

Only 8 out of 24 provinces still have bicameral legislatures, with a Senate and a Chamber of Deputies: Buenos Aires, Catamarca, Corrientes, Entre Ríos, Mendoza, Salta, San Luis (since 1987) and Santa Fe. Tucumán and Córdoba changed to unicameral systems in 1990 and 2001 respectively. Santiago del Estero changed to a bicameral legislature in 1884, but changed back to a unicameral system in 1903.

=== Australia ===
When the Australian states were founded as British colonies in the 19th century, they each had a bicameral Parliament. The lower house was traditionally elected based on the one-vote-one-value principle, with universal male suffrage, later expanded to women, whereas the upper house was either appointed on the advice of the government or elected, with a strong bias towards country voters and landowners. After Federation, these became the state Parliaments. In Queensland, the appointed upper house was abolished in 1922, while in New South Wales there were similar attempts at abolition, before the upper house was reformed in the 1970s to provide for direct election.

Beginning in the 1970s, Australian states (except Queensland, which is unicameral) began to reform their upper houses to introduce proportional representation in line with the Federal Senate. The first was the South Australian Legislative Council in 1973, which initially used a party list system (replaced with STV in 1982), followed by the Single Transferable Vote being introduced for the New South Wales Legislative Council in 1978, the Western Australian Legislative Council in 1987 and the Victorian Legislative Council in 2003.

Nowadays, the upper house both federally and in most states is elected using proportional representation while the lower house uses Instant-runoff voting in single member electorates. This is reversed in the state of Tasmania, where proportional representation is used for the lower house and single member electorates for the upper house.

=== Bosnia and Herzegovina ===
The Legislature of the Federation of Bosnia and Herzegovina, one of the two entities of Bosnia and Herzegovina, is a bicameral legislative body. The House of Representatives has 98 delegates, elected for four-year terms by proportional representation. The House of Peoples has 58 members, 17 delegates from among each of the constituent peoples of the Federation, and 7 delegates from among the other peoples. Republika Srpska, the other entity, has a unicameral parliament, known as the National Assembly, but there is also a Council of Peoples who is de facto the other legislative house.

=== India ===
Only 6 of the 36 states or Union Territories of India have bicameral legislatures, Andhra Pradesh, Bihar, Karnataka, Maharashtra, Telangana, and Uttar Pradesh, while the rest all have unicameral legislatures. The lower houses are called Legislative Assemblies, and their members are elected by universal adult suffrage from single-member constituencies in state elections, which are normally held every five years called Vidhana Sabha. In the six states with bicameral legislatures, the upper house is called the Legislative Council (Vidhan Parishad) or Vidhana Parishat, one-third of whose members are elected every two years. Members of the Legislative Council are elected in various ways:

- One-third are elected by the members of local bodies in the state such as municipalities, gram panchayats, block development councils and district councils.
- One-third are elected by the members of the state's Legislative Assembly from amongst persons who are not members of the State Legislative Assembly.
- One-sixth are nominated by the governor of the state from amongst persons having knowledge or practical experience in fields such as literature, science, arts, the co-operative movement and social service.
- One-twelfth are elected from special constituencies by persons who are college graduates of three years' standing residing in those constituencies.
- One-twelfth are elected by persons engaged for at least three years in teaching in educational institutions within the state not lower than secondary schools, including colleges and universities.

From 1956 to 1958 the Andhra Pradesh Legislature was unicameral. In 1958, when the State Legislative Council was formed, it became bicameral until 1 June 1985 when it was abolished. This continued until March 2007 when the State Legislative Council was reestablished and elections were held for its seats. In Tamil Nadu, a resolution was passed on 14 May 1986 and the state's Legislative Council was dissolved on 1 November 1986. Again on 12 April 2010, a resolution was passed to reestablish the council, but was ultimately unsuccessful. Similarly, the states of Assam, Jammu and Kashmir, Madhya Pradesh, Punjab, and West Bengal have also dissolved the upper houses of their state legislatures.

=== United States ===
During the 1930s, the legislature of the State of Nebraska was reduced from bicameral to unicameral with the 43 members that once comprised that state's Senate. One of the arguments used to sell the idea at the time to Nebraska voters was that by adopting a unicameral system, the perceived evils of the "conference committee" process would be eliminated.

A conference committee is appointed when the two chambers cannot agree on the same wording of a proposal, and consists of a small number of legislators from each chamber. This tends to place much power in the hands of only a small number of legislators. Whatever legislation, if any, the conference committee finalizes is presented in an unamendable "take-it-or-leave-it" manner by both chambers.

During his term as governor of the State of Minnesota, Jesse Ventura proposed converting the Minnesotan legislature to a single chamber with proportional representation, as a reform that he felt would solve many legislative difficulties and impinge upon legislative corruption. In his book on political issues, Do I Stand Alone?, Ventura argued that bicameral legislatures for provincial and local areas were excessive and unnecessary, and discussed unicameralism as a reform that could address many legislative and budgetary problems for states.

=== Historical ===
The German federal state of Bavaria had a bicameral legislature from 1946 to 1999, when the Senate was abolished by a referendum amending the state's constitution. The other 15 states have used a unicameral system since their founding.

In the Soviet Union, regional and local Soviets were unicameral. After the adoption of the 1993 Russian Constitution, bicameralism was introduced in some regions. Bicameral regional legislatures are still technically allowed by federal law but this clause is dormant now. The last region to switch from bicameralism to unicameralism was Sverdlovsk Oblast in 2012.

Four Brazilian states (Bahia, Ceará, Pernambuco, and São Paulo) had bicameral legislatures that were abolished when Getúlio Vargas came to power after the Revolution of 1930.

== Reform ==
=== Arab political reform ===
A 2005 report on democratic reform in the Arab world by the U.S. Council on Foreign Relations co-sponsored by former Secretary of State Madeleine Albright urged Arab states to adopt bicameralism, with upper chambers appointed on a 'specialized basis'. The Council claimed that this would protect against the 'Tyranny of the majority', expressing concerns that without a system of checks and balances extremists would use the single chamber parliaments to restrict the rights of minority groups.

In 2002, Bahrain adopted a bicameral system with an elected lower chamber and an appointed upper house. This led to a boycott of parliamentary elections that year by the Al Wefaq party, who said that the government would use the upper house to veto their plans. Many secular critics of bicameralism were won around to its benefits in 2005, after many MPs in the lower house voted for the introduction of so-called morality police.

=== Romania ===
A referendum on introducing a unicameral Parliament instead of the current bicameral Parliament was held in Romania on 22 November 2009. The turnout rate was 50.95%, with 77.78% of "Yes" votes for a unicameral Parliament. This referendum had a consultative role, thus requiring a parliamentary initiative and another referendum to ratify the new proposed changes.

=== Ivory Coast ===
A referendum on a new constitution was held on 30 October 2016. The constitution draft would create a bicameral Parliament instead of the current unicameral. The Senate is expected to represent the interests of territorial collectivities and Ivoirians living abroad. Two thirds of the Senate is to be elected at the same time as the general election. The remaining one third is appointed by the president elect.

=== Georgia ===
Georgia, currently a unitary republic with the Parliament as only chamber, adopted a provision to its constitution in 2017. According to article 37, the country will shift to bicameralism once Georgia restores its jurisdiction over the Russian-occupied territories, with the Parliament being renamed to the Council of the Republic, and the Senate composed of members elected from Adjara, Abkhazia, other territorial units and five presidential appointees forming a new chamber.

=== Bangladesh ===
The Constitutional Reform Commission of Bangladesh has proposed to establish an upper house of the Parliament, the Senate of Bangladesh. According to the July Charter, the members of the upper house, who are called senators, will be elected according to the percentage of the vote of the lower house election, with an additional 5 members nominated by the president of Bangladesh. The seat total of the house will be 105.

The 2026 Bangladeshi constitutional referendum decided whether the Senate would be established or not.

== List of bicameral legislatures ==
=== Current ===
Nations with a bicameral legislature Nations with a unicameral legislature Nations with a unicameral legislature and an advisory body Nations with no legislature Nations with a vacant legislature or no data

==== Federal ====
Country	Bicameral body		Notes
Country	Upper house	Lower house	Notes
Country	Seats of Upper house	Seats of Lower house	Notes
Argentina	National Congress		Of the twenty-three provincial legislatures, eight (Buenos Aires, Catamarca, Corrientes, Entre Ríos, Mendoza, Salta, San Luis, and Santa Fe) are bicameral, while the remaining fifteen and the legislature of the Autonomous City of Buenos Aires are unicameral.
Argentina	Senate	Chamber of Deputies	Of the twenty-three provincial legislatures, eight (Buenos Aires, Catamarca, Corrientes, Entre Ríos, Mendoza, Salta, San Luis, and Santa Fe) are bicameral, while the remaining fifteen and the legislature of the Autonomous City of Buenos Aires are unicameral.
Argentina	72	257	Of the twenty-three provincial legislatures, eight (Buenos Aires, Catamarca, Corrientes, Entre Ríos, Mendoza, Salta, San Luis, and Santa Fe) are bicameral, while the remaining fifteen and the legislature of the Autonomous City of Buenos Aires are unicameral.
Australia	Parliament		All of the state parliaments except Queensland's are also bicameral. The legislatures of the NT and the ACT are unicameral.
Australia	Senate	House of Representatives	All of the state parliaments except Queensland's are also bicameral. The legislatures of the NT and the ACT are unicameral.
Australia	76	150	All of the state parliaments except Queensland's are also bicameral. The legislatures of the NT and the ACT are unicameral.
Austria	Parliament		All of the Bundesländer have unicameral parliaments.
Austria	Bundesrat (Federal Council)	Nationalrat (National Council)	All of the Bundesländer have unicameral parliaments.
Austria	60	183	All of the Bundesländer have unicameral parliaments.
Belgium	Federal Parliament		All of the community and regional parliaments are unicameral.
Belgium	Senate	Chamber of Representatives	All of the community and regional parliaments are unicameral.
Belgium	60	150	All of the community and regional parliaments are unicameral.
Bosnia and Herzegovina	Parliamentary Assembly		The Parliament of the Federation of Bosnia and Herzegovina is also bicameral, while the National Assembly of Republika Srpska is unicameral.
Bosnia and Herzegovina	House of Peoples	House of Representatives	The Parliament of the Federation of Bosnia and Herzegovina is also bicameral, while the National Assembly of Republika Srpska is unicameral.
Bosnia and Herzegovina	15	42	The Parliament of the Federation of Bosnia and Herzegovina is also bicameral, while the National Assembly of Republika Srpska is unicameral.
Brazil	National Congress		All of the 26 state legislatures and the Federal District legislature are unicameral.
Brazil	Senate	Chamber of Deputies	All of the 26 state legislatures and the Federal District legislature are unicameral.
Brazil	81	513	All of the 26 state legislatures and the Federal District legislature are unicameral.
Canada	Parliament		All of the provincial and territorial legislatures are unicameral.
Canada	Senate	House of Commons	All of the provincial and territorial legislatures are unicameral.
Canada	105	343	All of the provincial and territorial legislatures are unicameral.
Ethiopia	Federal Parliamentary Assembly		Regional Councils are unicameral. Assemblypersons of the Regional Councils are elected directly.
Ethiopia	House of Federation	House of Peoples' Representatives	Regional Councils are unicameral. Assemblypersons of the Regional Councils are elected directly.
Ethiopia	112	547	Regional Councils are unicameral. Assemblypersons of the Regional Councils are elected directly.
Germany	N/A		Technically, Bundestag and Bundesrat form two distinct unicameral legislative constitutional bodies not framed by a comprehensive institution. German jurisprudence does not recognise the Bundesrat as a parliamentary chamber, because it consists of members of the state governments. Although it must always be heard in the legislative process, it only has to give consent to bills in certain defined areas. All of the federal states (Länder) today have unicameral Landtage.
Germany	Bundesrat (Federal Council)	Bundestag (Federal Diet)	Technically, Bundestag and Bundesrat form two distinct unicameral legislative constitutional bodies not framed by a comprehensive institution. German jurisprudence does not recognise the Bundesrat as a parliamentary chamber, because it consists of members of the state governments. Although it must always be heard in the legislative process, it only has to give consent to bills in certain defined areas. All of the federal states (Länder) today have unicameral Landtage.
Germany	69	630	Technically, Bundestag and Bundesrat form two distinct unicameral legislative constitutional bodies not framed by a comprehensive institution. German jurisprudence does not recognise the Bundesrat as a parliamentary chamber, because it consists of members of the state governments. Although it must always be heard in the legislative process, it only has to give consent to bills in certain defined areas. All of the federal states (Länder) today have unicameral Landtage.
India	Parliament		Six of the twenty-eight states also have bicameral legislatures, consisting of the upper house, the State Legislative Council (Vidhan Parishad) and the lower house, the State Legislative Assembly (Vidhan Sabha) respectively. The remaining twenty-two states and the union territories of Delhi, Jammu and Kashmir and Puducherry have unicameral legislatures.
India	Rajya Sabha (Council of States)	Lok Sabha (House of the People)	Six of the twenty-eight states also have bicameral legislatures, consisting of the upper house, the State Legislative Council (Vidhan Parishad) and the lower house, the State Legislative Assembly (Vidhan Sabha) respectively. The remaining twenty-two states and the union territories of Delhi, Jammu and Kashmir and Puducherry have unicameral legislatures.
India	245	543	Six of the twenty-eight states also have bicameral legislatures, consisting of the upper house, the State Legislative Council (Vidhan Parishad) and the lower house, the State Legislative Assembly (Vidhan Sabha) respectively. The remaining twenty-two states and the union territories of Delhi, Jammu and Kashmir and Puducherry have unicameral legislatures.
Iraq	Parliament		The Federation Council is envisioned by article 65 of the constitution as an upper house but has never convened, meaning the legislature de facto practices as a unicameral system solely under the Council of Representatives.
Iraq	Federation Council	Council of Representatives	The Federation Council is envisioned by article 65 of the constitution as an upper house but has never convened, meaning the legislature de facto practices as a unicameral system solely under the Council of Representatives.
Iraq	0	329	The Federation Council is envisioned by article 65 of the constitution as an upper house but has never convened, meaning the legislature de facto practices as a unicameral system solely under the Council of Representatives.
Malaysia	Parliament		All the 13 State Legislative Assemblies are unicameral.
Malaysia	Dewan Negara (Senate)	Dewan Rakyat (House of Representatives)	All the 13 State Legislative Assemblies are unicameral.
Malaysia	70	222	All the 13 State Legislative Assemblies are unicameral.
Mexico	Congress		All the 31 State Congresses and the Congress of Mexico City are unicameral.
Mexico	Senate	Chamber of Deputies	All the 31 State Congresses and the Congress of Mexico City are unicameral.
Mexico	128	500	All the 31 State Congresses and the Congress of Mexico City are unicameral.
Nepal	Parliament		All of the provincial assemblies are unicameral.
Nepal	Rastriya Sabha (National Assembly)	Pratinidhi Sabha (House of Representatives)	All of the provincial assemblies are unicameral.
Nepal	59	275	All of the provincial assemblies are unicameral.
Nigeria	National Assembly		All of the houses of assembly of Nigerian states are unicameral.
Nigeria	Senate	House of Representatives	All of the houses of assembly of Nigerian states are unicameral.
Nigeria	109	360	All of the houses of assembly of Nigerian states are unicameral.
Pakistan	Parliament		All of the provincial assemblies are unicameral.
Pakistan	Senate	National Assembly	All of the provincial assemblies are unicameral.
Pakistan	96	336	All of the provincial assemblies are unicameral.
Russia	Federal Assembly		All the regional legislatures are now unicameral while bicameralism in regions is technically allowed by the Federation.
Russia	Federation Council	State Duma	All the regional legislatures are now unicameral while bicameralism in regions is technically allowed by the Federation.
Russia	178	450	All the regional legislatures are now unicameral while bicameralism in regions is technically allowed by the Federation.
Somalia	Parliament		
Somalia	Senate	House of The People	
Somalia	54	275	
Switzerland	Federal Assembly		All of the cantons have unicameral parliaments.
Switzerland	Council of States	National Council	All of the cantons have unicameral parliaments.
Switzerland	46	200	All of the cantons have unicameral parliaments.
United States	Congress		All of the state legislatures are bicameral, except Nebraska. The Council of the District of Columbia is unicameral.
United States	Senate	House of Representatives	All of the state legislatures are bicameral, except Nebraska. The Council of the District of Columbia is unicameral.
United States	100	435	All of the state legislatures are bicameral, except Nebraska. The Council of the District of Columbia is unicameral.

==== Unitary ====
Country	Bicameral body		Notes
Country	Upper house	Lower house	Notes
Country	Seats of Upper house	Seats of Lower house	Notes
Algeria	Parliament		
Algeria	Council of the Nation	People's National Assembly	
Algeria	174	407	
Antigua and Barbuda	Parliament		
Antigua and Barbuda	Senate	House of Representatives	
Antigua and Barbuda	17	17	
Bahamas	Parliament		
Bahamas	Senate	House of Assembly	
Bahamas	16	41	
Bahrain	National Assembly		
Bahrain	Consultative Council	Council of Representatives	
Bahrain	40	40	
Barbados	Parliament		
Barbados	Senate	House of Assembly	
Barbados	21	30	
Belarus	National Assembly		
Belarus	Council	House of Representatives	
Belarus	64	110	
Belize	National Assembly		
Belize	Senate	House of Representatives	
Belize	13	31	
Benin	Beninese Parliament		
Benin	Senate	National Assembly	
Benin	25	109	
Bhutan	Parliament		
Bhutan	National Council	National Assembly	
Bhutan	25	47	
Bolivia	Plurinational Legislative Assembly		
Bolivia	Senate	Chamber of Deputies	
Bolivia	36	130	
Burundi	Parliament		
Burundi	Senate	National Assembly	
Burundi	13	111	
Cambodia	Parliament		
Cambodia	Senate	National Assembly	
Cambodia	62	125	
Cameroon	Parliament		
Cameroon	Senate	National Assembly	
Cameroon	100	180	
Chad	Parliament of Chad		
Chad	Senate	National Assembly	
Chad	69	188	
Chile	National Congress		
Chile	Senate	Chamber of Deputies	
Chile	50	155	
Colombia	Congress		
Colombia	Senate	Chamber of Representatives	
Colombia	103	183	
Czech Republic	Parliament		
Czech Republic	Senate	Chamber of Deputies	
Czech Republic	81	200	
DR Congo	Parliament		
DR Congo	Senate	National Assembly	
DR Congo	108	500	
Congo	Parliament		
Congo	Senate	National Assembly	
Congo	72	151	
Dominican Republic	Congress		
Dominican Republic	Senate	Chamber of Deputies	
Dominican Republic	32	190	
Egypt	Parliament		
Egypt	Senate	House of Representatives	
Egypt	300	596	
Equatorial Guinea	Parliament		
Equatorial Guinea	Senate	National Assembly	
Equatorial Guinea	55	100	
Eswatini	Parliament		
Eswatini	Senate	House of Assembly	
Eswatini	30	70	
France	Parliament in the Fifth French Republic		All Regional Councils are unicameral. The regional councillors are elected directly.
France	Senate	National Assembly	All Regional Councils are unicameral. The regional councillors are elected directly.
France	348	577	All Regional Councils are unicameral. The regional councillors are elected directly.
Gabon	Parliament		
Gabon	Senate	National Assembly	
Gabon	70	145	
Guinea	Parliament of Guinea		
Guinea	Senate	National Assembly	
Guinea	87	147	
Grenada	Parliament		
Grenada	Senate	House of Representatives	
Grenada	13	15	
Haiti	Parliament		
Haiti	Senate	Chamber of Deputies	
Haiti	30	119	
Indonesia	People's Consultative Assembly		All of the provinces have unicameral parliaments.
Indonesia	Regional Representative Council	People's Representative Council	All of the provinces have unicameral parliaments.
Indonesia	152	580	All of the provinces have unicameral parliaments.
Ireland	Oireachtas		A 2013 proposal to abolish the Seanad was defeated at referendum.
Ireland	Seanad Éireann (Senate of Ireland)	Dáil Éireann (Assembly of Ireland)	A 2013 proposal to abolish the Seanad was defeated at referendum.
Ireland	60	174	A 2013 proposal to abolish the Seanad was defeated at referendum.
Italy	Parliament		Both houses possess the same powers. The executive is responsible to both houses. All of the regional councils are unicameral.
Italy	Senate of the Republic	Chamber of Deputies	Both houses possess the same powers. The executive is responsible to both houses. All of the regional councils are unicameral.
Italy	200	400	Both houses possess the same powers. The executive is responsible to both houses. All of the regional councils are unicameral.
Ivory Coast	Parliament		
Ivory Coast	Senate	National Assembly	
Ivory Coast	99	255	
Jamaica	Parliament		
Jamaica	Senate	House of Representatives	
Jamaica	21	63	
Japan	National Diet		
Japan	House of Councillors	House of Representatives	
Japan	248	465	
Jordan	Parliament		
Jordan	Senate	House of Representatives	
Jordan	69	138	
Kenya	Parliament		
Kenya	Senate	National Assembly	
Kenya	67	349	
Lesotho	Parliament		
Lesotho	Senate	National Assembly	
Lesotho	33	120	
Liberia	Legislature		
Liberia	Senate	House of Representatives	
Liberia	30	73	
Madagascar	Parliament		Senate supended. Unicameral parliament current "de facto"
Madagascar	Senate	National Assembly	Senate supended. Unicameral parliament current "de facto"
Madagascar	0	163	Senate supended. Unicameral parliament current "de facto"
Morocco	Parliament		
Morocco	House of Councillors	House of Representatives	
Morocco	120	395	
Myanmar	Pyidaungsu Hluttaw (Assembly of the Union)		All the 14 State and Region Hluttaw (Assemblies) are unicameral.
Myanmar	Amyotha Hluttaw (House of Nationalities)	Pyithu Hluttaw (House of Representatives)	All the 14 State and Region Hluttaw (Assemblies) are unicameral.
Myanmar	224	440	All the 14 State and Region Hluttaw (Assemblies) are unicameral.
Namibia	Parliament		
Namibia	National Council	National Assembly	
Namibia	42	104	
Netherlands	States General		Provincial councils are unicameral.
Netherlands	Eerste Kamer	Tweede Kamer	Provincial councils are unicameral.
Netherlands	75	150	Provincial councils are unicameral.
Oman	Parliament		
Oman	Majlis al-Dawla (Council of State)	Majlis al-Shura (Consultative Assembly)	
Oman	83	90	
Palau	National Congress		
Palau	Senate	House of Delegates	
Palau	13	16	
Paraguay	Congress		
Paraguay	Senate	Chamber of Deputies	
Paraguay	45	80	
Peru	Congress		The bicameral legislature was dissolved altogether by President Alberto Fujimori by his 1992 autocoup. Later, under the newer 1993 constitution, the bicameral system was replaced by the unicameral Congress of the Republic. Later, a constitutional reform approved in 2024 re-established the bicameralism and the Senate.
Peru	Senate	Chamber of Deputies	The bicameral legislature was dissolved altogether by President Alberto Fujimori by his 1992 autocoup. Later, under the newer 1993 constitution, the bicameral system was replaced by the unicameral Congress of the Republic. Later, a constitutional reform approved in 2024 re-established the bicameralism and the Senate.
Peru	60	130	The bicameral legislature was dissolved altogether by President Alberto Fujimori by his 1992 autocoup. Later, under the newer 1993 constitution, the bicameral system was replaced by the unicameral Congress of the Republic. Later, a constitutional reform approved in 2024 re-established the bicameralism and the Senate.
Philippines	Congress		The Bangsamoro Parliament of the Bangsamoro Autonomous Region in Muslim Mindanao and all Sangguniang Panlalawigan (Provincial Council), Sangguniang Panlungsod (City Council), and Sangguiniang Bayan (Municipal Council) are unicameral.
Philippines	Senate	House of Representatives	The Bangsamoro Parliament of the Bangsamoro Autonomous Region in Muslim Mindanao and all Sangguniang Panlalawigan (Provincial Council), Sangguniang Panlungsod (City Council), and Sangguiniang Bayan (Municipal Council) are unicameral.
Philippines	24	317	The Bangsamoro Parliament of the Bangsamoro Autonomous Region in Muslim Mindanao and all Sangguniang Panlalawigan (Provincial Council), Sangguniang Panlungsod (City Council), and Sangguiniang Bayan (Municipal Council) are unicameral.
Poland	Parliament		All of the voivodeship sejmiks are unicameral. Bicameral body technically does not have a name instead being referred to as the Sejm and the Senate, but generally when referring to the body the name Parliament is used, as it is the most official unofficial name.
Poland	Senate	Sejm (Diet)	All of the voivodeship sejmiks are unicameral. Bicameral body technically does not have a name instead being referred to as the Sejm and the Senate, but generally when referring to the body the name Parliament is used, as it is the most official unofficial name.
Poland	100	460	All of the voivodeship sejmiks are unicameral. Bicameral body technically does not have a name instead being referred to as the Sejm and the Senate, but generally when referring to the body the name Parliament is used, as it is the most official unofficial name.
Romania	Parliament		
Romania	Senate	Chamber of Deputies	
Romania	136	330	
Rwanda	Parliament		
Rwanda	Senate	Chamber of Deputies	
Rwanda	26	80	
Saint Lucia	Parliament		
Saint Lucia	Senate	House of Assembly	
Saint Lucia	11	17	
Slovenia	Parliament		In 2008, the Constitutional Court of Slovenia recognized the Slovenian Parliament as incompletely bicameral.
Slovenia	National Council	National Assembly	In 2008, the Constitutional Court of Slovenia recognized the Slovenian Parliament as incompletely bicameral.
Slovenia	40	90	In 2008, the Constitutional Court of Slovenia recognized the Slovenian Parliament as incompletely bicameral.
South Africa	Parliament		All of the provincial legislatures are unicameral.
South Africa	National Council of Provinces	National Assembly	All of the provincial legislatures are unicameral.
South Africa	90	400	All of the provincial legislatures are unicameral.
Spain	Cortes Generales		A fixed number of 208 members of the Senate are elected by citizens, a variable number (currently 58) are appointed by the autonomous regions. Congress of Deputies can override a negative vote of the Senate on a bill with an absolute majority affirmative vote. Moreover, each Spanish autonomous region has its own unicameral regional parliament, with wide-ranging legislative powers on their own.
Spain	Senate	Congress of Deputies	A fixed number of 208 members of the Senate are elected by citizens, a variable number (currently 58) are appointed by the autonomous regions. Congress of Deputies can override a negative vote of the Senate on a bill with an absolute majority affirmative vote. Moreover, each Spanish autonomous region has its own unicameral regional parliament, with wide-ranging legislative powers on their own.
Spain	266	350	A fixed number of 208 members of the Senate are elected by citizens, a variable number (currently 58) are appointed by the autonomous regions. Congress of Deputies can override a negative vote of the Senate on a bill with an absolute majority affirmative vote. Moreover, each Spanish autonomous region has its own unicameral regional parliament, with wide-ranging legislative powers on their own.
Tajikistan	Supreme Assembly		
Tajikistan	National Assembly	Assembly of Representatives	
Tajikistan	33	63	
Thailand	National Assembly		
Thailand	Senate	House of Representatives	
Thailand	200	500	
Togo	Parliament		
Togo	Senate	National Assembly	
Togo	61	113	
Trinidad and Tobago	Parliament		The Tobago House of Assembly in the island of Tobago is unicameral.
Trinidad and Tobago	Senate	House of Representatives	The Tobago House of Assembly in the island of Tobago is unicameral.
Trinidad and Tobago	31	41	The Tobago House of Assembly in the island of Tobago is unicameral.
Tunisia	Parliament		
Tunisia	National Council of Regions and Districts	Assembly of the Representatives of the People	
Tunisia	77	161	
United Kingdom	Parliament		Scotland, Wales and Northern Ireland have devolved unicameral legislatures, each with a varying range of powers.
United Kingdom	House of Lords	House of Commons	Scotland, Wales and Northern Ireland have devolved unicameral legislatures, each with a varying range of powers.
United Kingdom	796	650	Scotland, Wales and Northern Ireland have devolved unicameral legislatures, each with a varying range of powers.
Uruguay	General Assembly		
Uruguay	Senate	Chamber of Representatives	
Uruguay	30	99	
Uzbekistan	Oliy Majlis		
Uzbekistan	Senate	Legislative Chamber	
Uzbekistan	100	150	
Yemen	Parliament		
Yemen	Shura Council	House of Representatives	
Yemen	111	301	
Zimbabwe	Parliament		
Zimbabwe	Senate	National Assembly of Zimbabwe	
Zimbabwe	90	280	

=== Territorial ===
Country	Bicameral body		Notes
Country	Upper house	Lower house	Notes
Country	Seats of Upper house	Seats of Lower house	Notes
American Samoa	Fono		Unincorporated territory of the United States
American Samoa	Senate	House of Representatives	Unincorporated territory of the United States
American Samoa	18	21	Unincorporated territory of the United States
Bermuda	Parliament		British Overseas Territory
Bermuda	Senate	House of Assembly	British Overseas Territory
Bermuda	11	36	British Overseas Territory
Isle of Man	Tynwald		British Overseas Territory
Isle of Man	Legislative Council	House of Keys	British Overseas Territory
Isle of Man	11	24	British Overseas Territory
Northern Mariana Islands	Commonwealth Legislature		Commonwealth of the United States
Northern Mariana Islands	Senate	House of Representatives	Commonwealth of the United States
Northern Mariana Islands	9	20	Commonwealth of the United States
Puerto Rico	Legislative Assembly		Unincorporated territory of the United States/Commonwealth
Puerto Rico	Senate	House of Representatives	Unincorporated territory of the United States/Commonwealth
Puerto Rico	28	53	Unincorporated territory of the United States/Commonwealth

=== State parliaments with limited recognition ===
Country	Bicameral body		Notes
Country	Upper house	Lower house	Notes
Country	Seats of Upper house	Seats of Lower house	Notes
Somaliland	Parliament		Each house has 82 members. The constitution of Somaliland does not clarify how members of the elders house are elected. But the members of the house of representative are elected once every five years.
Somaliland	House of Elders	House of Representatives	Each house has 82 members. The constitution of Somaliland does not clarify how members of the elders house are elected. But the members of the house of representative are elected once every five years.
Somaliland	82	82	Each house has 82 members. The constitution of Somaliland does not clarify how members of the elders house are elected. But the members of the house of representative are elected once every five years.

== List of historical bicameral legislatures ==
Country	Bicameral body		Notes	
Country	Upper house	Lower house	Notes	
Country	Croatia	Parliament	Notes	Between 1990 and 2001
Chamber of Counties	Croatia	Chamber of Representatives		Between 1990 and 2001
Czechoslovakia	National Assembly		Between 1920 and 1939	
Czechoslovakia	Senate	Chamber of Deputies	Between 1920 and 1939	
Czechoslovakia	Federal Assembly		Under the Constitutional Act on the Czechoslovak Federation, the Federal Assembly replaced the unicameral National Assembly in 1969. Its two constituent republics, the Czech (Socialist) Republic and the Slovak (Socialist) Republic, had unicameral legislatures (Czech National Council and Slovak National Council). When Czechoslovakia was dissolved at the start of 1993, the Federal Assembly was disbanded. The Czech Republic established their upper house, the Senate, in December 1992.	
Czechoslovakia	Chamber of Nations	Chamber of People	Under the Constitutional Act on the Czechoslovak Federation, the Federal Assembly replaced the unicameral National Assembly in 1969. Its two constituent republics, the Czech (Socialist) Republic and the Slovak (Socialist) Republic, had unicameral legislatures (Czech National Council and Slovak National Council). When Czechoslovakia was dissolved at the start of 1993, the Federal Assembly was disbanded. The Czech Republic established their upper house, the Senate, in December 1992.	
Denmark	Rigsdagen		Under the 1849 constitution Rigsdagen was created, with two houses, an upper and a lower house. However, after the 1953 referendum, both Rigsdagen and the Landsting was abolished, making the Folketing the sole chamber of the parliament.	
Denmark	Landsting (Upper house)	Folketing (Lower house)	Under the 1849 constitution Rigsdagen was created, with two houses, an upper and a lower house. However, after the 1953 referendum, both Rigsdagen and the Landsting was abolished, making the Folketing the sole chamber of the parliament.	
Fiji	Parliament		Original bicameral system suspended by 2006 coup. 2013 Constitution of Fiji abolished it and replaced it with a single chamber Parliament.	
Fiji	Senate	House of Representatives	Original bicameral system suspended by 2006 coup. 2013 Constitution of Fiji abolished it and replaced it with a single chamber Parliament.	
Greece	Parliament of the Hellenes		The Senate as an upper chamber was established by the Greek Constitution of 1844, of the Kingdom of Greece, and was abolished by the Greek Constitution of 1864. The Senate was reestablished by the republican Constitution of 1927, which establishing the Second Hellenic Republic and was disestablished by the restoration of the Kingdom of Greece at 1935.	
Greece	Gerousia (Senate)	Vouli (Chamber of Deputies)	The Senate as an upper chamber was established by the Greek Constitution of 1844, of the Kingdom of Greece, and was abolished by the Greek Constitution of 1864. The Senate was reestablished by the republican Constitution of 1927, which establishing the Second Hellenic Republic and was disestablished by the restoration of the Kingdom of Greece at 1935.	
Hungary	Assembly of the Realm		Between 1608 and 1918 the Hungarian Parliament called Országgyűlés (Assembly of the Realm) had a bicameral structure, both houses having the same rights in legislature. In 1848 the popular representation was introduced for the Lower Table (replacing the representation of the Estates), while with Act VII of 1885 the Upper Table was slightly transformed, but its historical and partly aristocratic nature was preserved.	
Hungary	Upper Table (after 1885: House of Lords)	Lower Table (after 1848: House of Representatives)	Between 1608 and 1918 the Hungarian Parliament called Országgyűlés (Assembly of the Realm) had a bicameral structure, both houses having the same rights in legislature. In 1848 the popular representation was introduced for the Lower Table (replacing the representation of the Estates), while with Act VII of 1885 the Upper Table was slightly transformed, but its historical and partly aristocratic nature was preserved.	
Hungary	Assembly of the Realm		Between 1927 and 1944 the Hungarian Parliament became bicameral again, as Act XXII of 1926 reistanted the upper chamber, now simply called Felsőház (Upper House). This new house was partly an elected body: the mid-level local governments (counties) and some corporative, cultural and scientific associations (such as, e.g., the universities or the chamber of commerce) got the right to co-opt deputies from their own members. From 1945 on, the Hungarian Parliament is a unicameral legislative body.	
Hungary	Upper House	House of Representatives	Between 1927 and 1944 the Hungarian Parliament became bicameral again, as Act XXII of 1926 reistanted the upper chamber, now simply called Felsőház (Upper House). This new house was partly an elected body: the mid-level local governments (counties) and some corporative, cultural and scientific associations (such as, e.g., the universities or the chamber of commerce) got the right to co-opt deputies from their own members. From 1945 on, the Hungarian Parliament is a unicameral legislative body.	
Iceland	Parliament		Once the Icelandic Parliament was restored by royal decree in 1844, it originally operated unicamerally from 1845 to 1874 when it became principally bicameral with an additional third chamber, known as Unified Parliament. However, the third chamber consisted of the union of the other two and deliberated as a single body, which makes some scholars classify it as only a bicameral system. However, the third chamber did have its own speaker distinct from the speakers for the other two chambers. The Icelandic Parliament followed the legislatures of Denmark and Sweden and became unicameral once more in 1991.	
Iceland	Upper Chamber	Lower Chamber		
Iran	Parliament		Between 1950 and 1979	
Iran	Senate	National Assembly	Between 1950 and 1979	
Kazakhstan	Parliament		Disbanded on 1 July 2026, following the 2026 Kazakh constitutional referendum.	
Kazakhstan	Senate	Mäjilis (Assembly of People)	Disbanded on 1 July 2026, following the 2026 Kazakh constitutional referendum.	
Korea, South	National Assembly		Under the first constitution (first republic, 1948–52), the National Assembly was unicameral. The second and third constitutions (first republic, 1952–60) regulated the National Assembly was bicameral and consisted of the House of Commons and the Senate, but only the House of Commons was established and the House of Commons could not pass a bill to establish the Senate. During the short-lived second republic (1960–61), the National Assembly became practically bicameral, but it was overturned by the May 16 coup. The National Assembly has been unicameral since its reopen in 1963.	
Korea, South	Senate	House of Commons		
Mauritania	Parliament		Under the 2017 Mauritanian constitutional referendum, the bicameral system was replaced and the Senate was abolished.	
Mauritania	Senate	National Assembly	Under the 2017 Mauritanian constitutional referendum, the bicameral system was replaced and the Senate was abolished.	
New Zealand	Parliament		Until 1950, the New Zealand Parliament was bicameral. It became unicameral in 1951, following the abolition of the Legislative Council via the Suicide Squad, leaving the House of Representatives as the sole parliamentary chamber.	
New Zealand	Legislative Council	House of Representatives	Until 1950, the New Zealand Parliament was bicameral. It became unicameral in 1951, following the abolition of the Legislative Council via the Suicide Squad, leaving the House of Representatives as the sole parliamentary chamber.	
Polish–Lithuanian Commonwealth	General Sejm		The General Sejm was the parliament of the Polish–Lithuanian Commonwealth. It had descended from the Sejm of the Kingdom of Poland, and possessed two chambers. The Chamber of Deputies was indirectly elected by sejmiks, while the Senate was composed of various offices who were members ex-officio, with the offices themselves being appointed by the King. The General Sejm was a specific type of sejm, with a number of other sejms (such as convocation sejms, election sejms, or coronation sejms) being composed differently and not being bicameral.	
Polish–Lithuanian Commonwealth	Senate	Chamber of Deputies		
Portugal	Cortes		During the period of Constitutional Monarchy, the Portuguese Parliament was bicameral. The lower house was the Chamber of Deputies and the upper house was the Chamber of Peers (except during the 1838–1842 period, where a Senate existed instead). With the replacement of the Monarchy by the Republic in 1910, the Parliament continued to be bicameral with a Chamber of Deputies and a Senate existing until 1926.	
Portugal	Chamber of Peers	Chamber of Deputies	During the period of Constitutional Monarchy, the Portuguese Parliament was bicameral. The lower house was the Chamber of Deputies and the upper house was the Chamber of Peers (except during the 1838–1842 period, where a Senate existed instead). With the replacement of the Monarchy by the Republic in 1910, the Parliament continued to be bicameral with a Chamber of Deputies and a Senate existing until 1926.	
Soviet Union	Supreme Soviet of the Soviet Union		The Congress of People's Deputies superseded the Supreme Soviet. The Soviet of the Republics briefly succeeded the Soviet of Nationalities in late 1991.	
Soviet Union	Soviet of Nationalities	Soviet of the Union	The Congress of People's Deputies superseded the Supreme Soviet. The Soviet of the Republics briefly succeeded the Soviet of Nationalities in late 1991.	
Sweden	Riksdagen		Until 1970, the Swedish Riksdag was bicameral. It became unicameral in 1971, but retained the name Riksdag.	
Sweden	Första kammaren (Upper house)	Andra kammaren (Lower house)	Until 1970, the Swedish Riksdag was bicameral. It became unicameral in 1971, but retained the name Riksdag.	
Taiwan	Parliament		The tricameral parliament became bicameral in 1993 after the 1991 constitutional amendments made the Control Yuan a non-parliamentary institution; the National Assembly became the upper house and the Legislative Yuan the lower house. The parliament became unicameral in 2005 when the National Assembly was suspended.	
Taiwan	National Assembly (Upper house)	Legislative Yuan (Lower house)	The tricameral parliament became bicameral in 1993 after the 1991 constitutional amendments made the Control Yuan a non-parliamentary institution; the National Assembly became the upper house and the Legislative Yuan the lower house. The parliament became unicameral in 2005 when the National Assembly was suspended.	
Turkey	Parliament		It was established with the Turkish constitution of 1961 and abolished with the Turkish constitution of 1982, although it did not exist between 1980 and 1982 either as a result of the 1980 coup d'état in Turkey.	
Turkey	Senate of the Republic	National Assembly	It was established with the Turkish constitution of 1961 and abolished with the Turkish constitution of 1982, although it did not exist between 1980 and 1982 either as a result of the 1980 coup d'état in Turkey.	
Turkmenistan	National Council			
Turkmenistan	People's Council	Assembly		
Venezuela	Congress		Under the 1999 constitution, the bicameral system was replaced by the unicameral National Assembly of Venezuela.	
Venezuela	Senate	Chamber of Deputies	Under the 1999 constitution, the bicameral system was replaced by the unicameral National Assembly of Venezuela.	
Republic of Vietnam	National Assembly		Between 1966 and 1975	
Republic of Vietnam	Senate	House of Representatives	Between 1966 and 1975	
Yugoslavia	Federal Assembly		Between 1974 and 1992.	
Yugoslavia	Chamber of Republics	Federal Chamber	Between 1974 and 1992.	

== See also ==
- Federalism
- List of abolished upper houses
- Tricameralism
- Unicameralism
