= Marcelo Casaretto =

Argentine politician (born 1967)

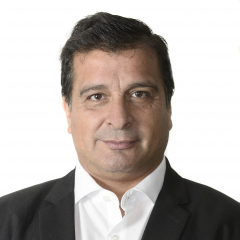

National Deputy
- Incumbent
- Assumed office 19 December 2019
- Constituency: Entre Ríos

Provincial Senator of Entre Ríos
- In office 10 December 1999 – 10 December 2003
- Constituency: Tala Department

Personal details
- Born: 26 April 1967 (age 59) Buenos Aires, Argentina
- Party: Justicialist Party
- Other political affiliations: Frente de Todos (2019–present)
- Education: National University of Entre Ríos; University of Buenos Aires
- Profession: Public accountant

Marcelo Pablo Casaretto (born 26 April 1967) is an Argentine politician, businessman and public accountant, currently serving as National Deputy elected in Entre Ríos Province. A member of the Justicialist Party, Casaretto was elected in 2019 as a member of the Frente de Todos coalition. He previously served as a member of the provincial senate from 1999 to 2003 and as Minister of Economy, Public Works and Services of Entre Ríos from 1997 to 1999, during the governorship of Jorge Busti.

Casaretto also serves as Vice President of Atlético Echagüe, a sports club based in Paraná.

== Early life and education ==
Casaretto was born on 26 April 1967 in Buenos Aires. He attended high school in Maciá. He studied public accounting at the National University of Entre Ríos, graduating in 1990. He then went on to complete a master's degree on economic history and policies from the University of Buenos Aires (2008) and a post-graduate degree on public policy from Universidad de San Andrés (2009).

From 2004 to 2019, he taught courses on Argentine Economy, International Economy, and International Economic History at the Autonomous University of Entre Ríos.

== Political career ==
In 1990, Casaretto was hired by the Ministry of Economy of Entre Ríos as part of the Federal Investments Council (CFI). In 1993, he was appointed Director of Relations with the Provinces by the national Ministry of Economy, during the administration of Domingo Cavallo. Later, in 1995, he was appointed Secretary of the Treasury and Undersecretary of Investments of Entre Ríos by Governor Jorge Busti. Busti would later appoint him as Minister of Economy, Public Works and Services in 1997.

In 1999, Casaretto was elected to the Senate of Entre Ríos for the Tala Department. He served as the Justicialist Party bloc president in the Senate. Following the end of his term in 2003, he served as an advisor to the provincial government during the second governorship of Jorge Busti. In 2017, he was appointed president of the Entre Ríos Housing and Planning Institute (IAPV).

=== National deputy ===
In the 2019 legislative election, Casaretto ran for one of Entre Ríos' seats in the Chamber of Deputies as the first candidate in the Frente de Todos list, followed by Blanca Osuna. The list was the second-most voted in Entre Ríos, with 45,20% of the vote, and both Casaretto and Osuna were elected. He was sworn in on 4 December 2019 and formed part of the Frente de Todos parliamentary inter-bloc.

As deputy, Casaretto formed part of the parliamentary commissions on Sports, Economy, Energy and Fuels, Foreign Affairs and Worship, and Housing and Urban Planning, and presided the commission on Prevision and Social Security. He was a supporter of the legalisation of abortion in Argentina, voting in favour of the 2020 Voluntary Interruption of Pregnancy bill, which passed the Chamber.

== Personal life ==
Casaretto has two sons, Germán (born in 1997) and Augusto (born in 2011). Sports-wise, he supports Club Atlético River Plate, Atlético Tala, and Atlético Echagüe. He currently serves as vice president of Atlético Echagüe, and is responsible for the club's basketball team.
