= Legislature of Salta =

Provincial legislature in Argentina

Legislature of Salta Province Legislatura de la Provincia de Salta

Type
- Type: Bicameral
- Houses: Senate; Chamber of Deputies

Leadership
- Senate President (Note: Ex officio as Vice Governor of Salta.): Antonio Marocco (CpS) since 10 December 2019
- 1st Senate Vice President: Mashur Lapad (CpS) since 10 December 2019
- Chamber President: Esteban Amat Lacroix (FJ Sáenz) since 10 December 2019

Structure
- Seats: 83; 23 senators 60 deputies
- Senate political groups: Government (20): Commitment for Salta; Evita Leadership; Opposition (3): Frente de Todos (3)
- Chamber of Deputies political groups: Government (45); Justicialist - Governor Sáenz Leadership (28); Salta Has a Future (10); More Salta (5); October 8th (1); Memory and Social Movilization (1); Opposition (15): Frente de Todos (5); Now Salta (3); Radical Civic Union (2); Independent Salta (2); PRO (1); Igualar (1); Change Salta TAC

Elections
- Last Senate election: 15 August 2021 (12 seats)
- Last Chamber of Deputies election: 15 August 2021 (30 seats)

Meeting place
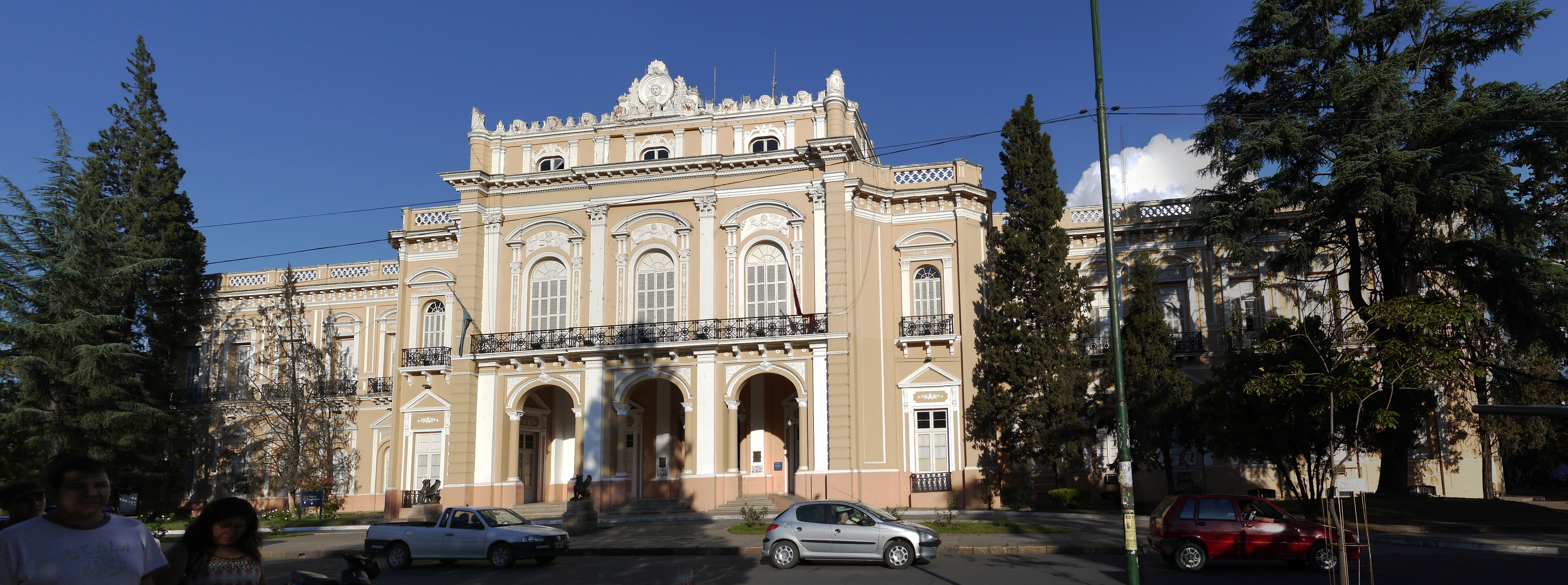
- Legislative Palace; Salta, Salta Province

The Legislature of Salta Province (Spanish: Legislatura de la Provincia de Salta) is the legislature of Salta, one of the twenty three provinces that make up Argentina. It is a bicameral body, comprising the Chamber of Deputies (made up of 60 representatives), and the Senate (with 23 representatives).

It is one of eight bicameral legislatures in the country. Senators are elected using the first-past-the-post (FPTP) system, with each senator representing one of Salta's 23 departments, while deputies are elected by a mixed FPTP / proportional representation system, wherein the most populous departments are allocated more seats, while the smallest departments elect a single deputy. Members of both houses are elected for four-year terms, and, as in the National Chamber of Deputies and most other provincial legislatures, elections are held every two years, so that half of its members are up in each election.

Both houses of the Legislature convene in the Legislative Palace, in the provincial capital of Salta. The building, a city landmark, is of an Italian academic style. Its construction began in 1892 and extended until 1902.

== See also ==
- List of provincial legislatures in Argentina
- National Congress of Argentina
  - Argentine Senate
  - Argentine Chamber of Deputies
