= Senate of Salta =

Provincial Legislature in Argentina

Senate of Satlta Cámara de Senadores de la Provincia de Salta

Type
- Type: Upper house of the Legislature of Salta

Leadership
- President (Note: Ex officio as Vice Governor of Salta.): Antonio Marocco, CpS since 10 December 2019
- 1st Vice President: Mashur Lapad, CpS since 10 December 2019
- 2nd Vice President: Walter Hernán Cruz, CpS since 10 December 2019
- 3rd Vice President: Esteban D'Andrea Cornejo, CpS since 10 December 2019

Structure
- Seats: 23
- Political groups: Government (20): Commitment for Salta; Evita Leadership; Opposition (3): Frente de Todos (3)

Elections
- Voting system: First-past-the-post
- Last election: 15 August 2021 (12 seats)

Meeting place
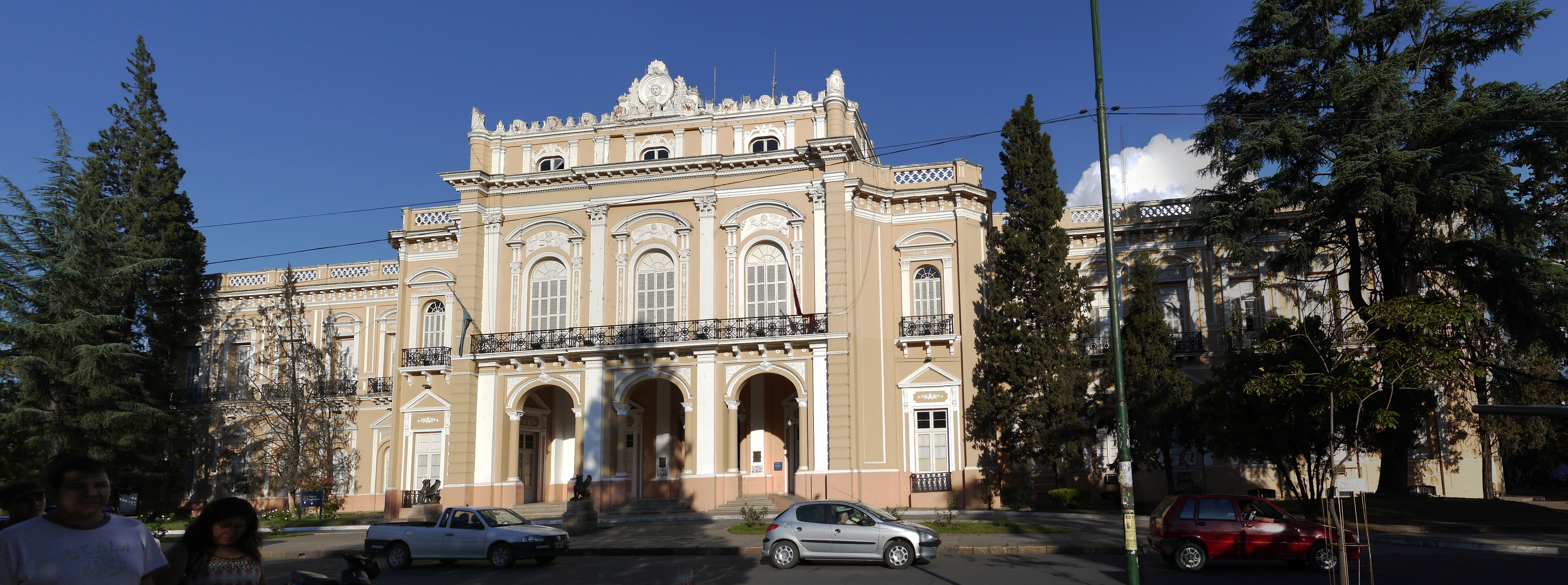
- Legislative Palace; Salta, Salta Province

Website
- http://www.senadosalta.gob.ar/

The Chamber of Senators of Salta Province (Spanish: Cámara de Senadores de la Provincia de Salta), better known simply as the Senate (Senado), is the upper house of the Legislature of Salta Province, one of Argentina's 23 provinces. It comprises 23 members elected in each of the 23 departments of Salta using the first-past-the-post system.

Senators are elected for four-year terms, and, as in the National Chamber of Deputies and most other provincial legislatures, elections are held every two years, so that half of its members are up in each election. The Senate is presided by the Vice Governor of the province, who is elected every four years alongside the governor. Presently, the post is occupied by Antonio Marocco of the Justicialist Party.

Alongside the Chamber of Deputies, the Senate convenes in the Legislative Palace, in the provincial capital of Salta. The building, a city landmark, is of an Italian academic style. Its construction began in 1892 and extended until 1902.
