= List of abolished lower houses =

This is a list of lower houses that have been abolished.

- The Irish House of Commons was abolished in 1800.
- The House of Representatives of Fiji was abolished in 2003.
- The Legislative Assembly of British Guiana was abolished in 1964.
- The Diet of Hungary
- The House of Representatives of South Korea
- The Nebraska House of Representatives
- The National Congress of Nicaragua
- The House of Commons of Northern Ireland
- The Andra kammaren of Sweden
- The Bombay Legislative Assembly
- The Chamber of Deputies of Portugal (1910-1926)
- The Venezuelan Chamber of Deputies was abolished after elections in 1998.

== See also ==
- List of abolished upper houses
