= Legislature of Corrientes =

Provincial legislature in Argentina

Legislature of Corrientes Province Legislatura de la Provincia de Corrientes

Type
- Type: Bicameral
- Houses: Senate; Chamber of Deputies

Leadership
- Senate President (Note: Ex officio as Vice Governor of Corrientes.): Pedro Braillard (ECO) since 10 December 2021
- 1st Senate Vice President: Henry Fick (ECO) since 10 December 2021
- Chamber President: Pedro Cassani (ECO) since 10 December 2019

Structure
- Seats: 45; 15 senators 30 deputies
- Senate political groups: Encounter for Corrientes (11); Frente de Todos (4)
- Chamber of Deputies political groups: Encounter for Corrientes (23); Frente de Todos (7)

Elections
- Last Senate election: 29 August 2021 (5 seats)
- Last Chamber of Deputies election: 15 August 2021 (15 seats)

Meeting place
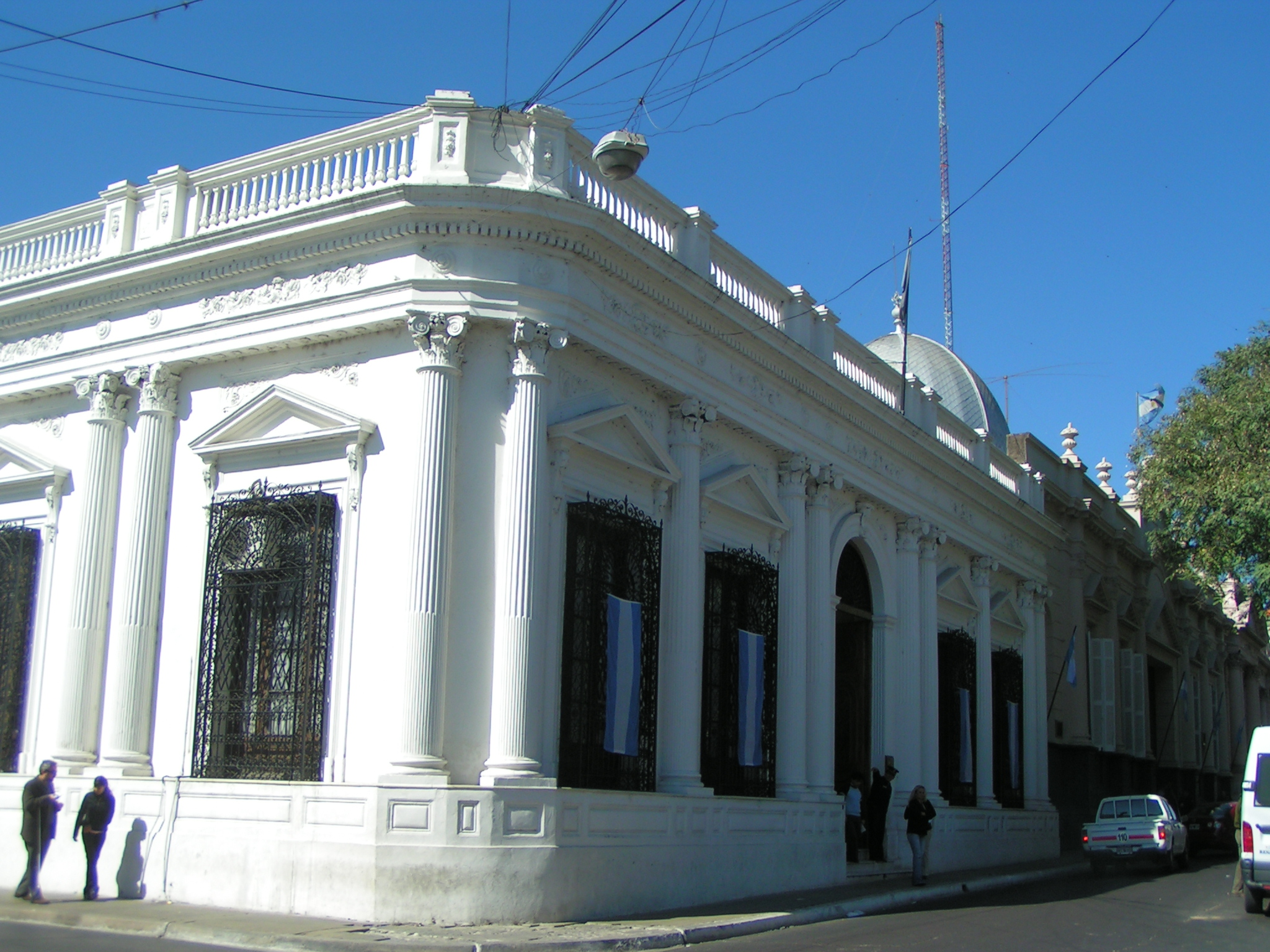
- Edificio de la Legislatura; Corrientes, Corrientes Province

The Legislature of Corrientes Province (Spanish: Legislatura de la Provincia de Corrientes) is the legislature of Corrientes, one of the twenty three provinces that make up Argentina. It is a bicameral body, comprising the Chamber of Deputies (made up of 30 representatives), and the Senate (with 15 representatives).

It is one of eight bicameral legislatures in the country. Members of both houses are elected by proportional representation in a single province-wide district. Senators serve for six years and deputies serve for four years; elections to both chambers are staggered; the Senate renews a third of its members every two years while the Chamber of Deputies renews half of its members every two years, emulating the system employed by both houses of the National Congress.

Both houses of the Legislature convene in the provincial capital of Corrientes.

== See also ==
- List of provincial legislatures in Argentina
- Parliament of Argentina
