= Rosario del Tala =

- City
- Location of Rosario del Tala in Argentina
- Coordinates: 32°18′S 59°8′W
- Country: Argentina
- Province: Entre Ríos
- Department: Tala

Population (2010 census)
  - Total: 12,801
- Time zone: UTC−3 (ART)
- CPA base: E3174
- Dialing code: +54 3445

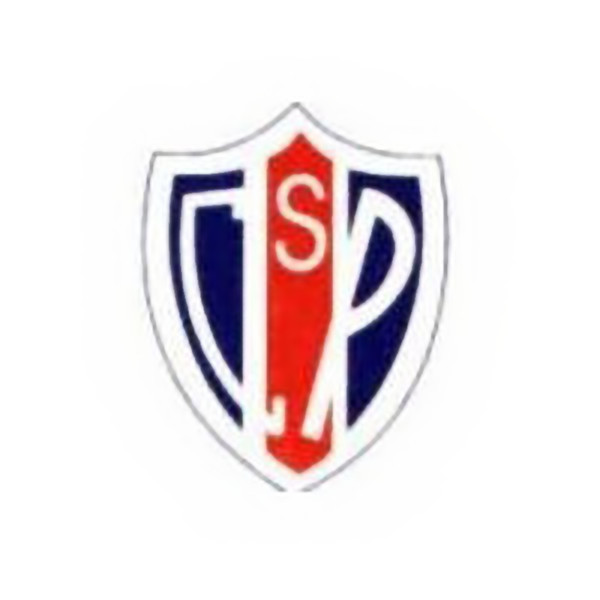
Club crest, Centro Sportivo Peñarol of Rosario del Tala, Entre Ríos, Argentina.

Rosario del Tala is a city in the center-south of the province of Entre Ríos, Argentina. It has 12,801 inhabitants as per the 2010 census [INDEC], and is the head town of the Tala Department. It lies on the western banks of the Gualeguay River, 179 km east-southeast from the provincial capital Paraná and 118 km due west from Colón.

A populated settlement existed in the area already in the 1750s, but the town was officially founded on 7 July 1863 by decree of governor Justo José de Urquiza.
