= List of abolished upper houses =

History of legislature simplification

This is a list of abolished upper houses of bicameral legislatures and parliaments at national and lower levels of government. The reasons for abolition include removal of unelected houses, under-representation of ethnic/religious minorities, under-representation of women, cost-cutting in government expenditure, longer and unlimited terms in office (leading to accusations of monarchism), and to speed up the process of legislation due to upper house scrutiny.

== Australia ==
=== Queensland ===
The Legislative Council of Queensland was the upper house of the Parliament of Queensland, and was entirely appointed by the Governor of Queensland.

The appointed membership, along with the Council's opposition to many of the reform measures of the Ryan Labor Government which was elected in 1915, resulted in the government formulating a policy to abolish the Council, a proposal continually rejected by Council Members, and defeated in a 1917 referendum.

After the Labor Government of Ted Theodore had Acting Governor William Lennon appoint 14 Labor Members to the Council, giving the Government a majority in the Upper House, the Legislative Council sat for the last time on 27 October 1921, the day after it voted itself out of existence.

All other Australian states continue to have a bicameral system.

== Canada ==
=== Provincial-level ===
Some Canadian provinces once possessed upper houses, but abolished them to adopt unicameral systems. Newfoundland had a Legislative Council prior to joining Canada, as did Ontario when it was Upper Canada. Newfoundland has the power to re-establish its upper house, the Legislative Council, pursuant to Term 14 (2) of the Terms of Union. Manitoba had an upper chamber until it was abolished in 1876, New Brunswick's upper chamber was abolished in 1892, Prince Edward Island's upper chamber was abolished in 1893, Nova Scotia's upper chamber was abolished in 1928 and Quebec's upper chamber was abolished in 1968.

== Denmark ==
The Landstinget was the upper house of the legislature of Denmark from 1849 until 1953. It was abolished in the 1953 referendum when the new constitution was approved.

== Estonia ==
According to the 1938 Constitution, the Riigikogu had two chambers, which replaced the unicameral system. The lower chamber was called Riigivolikogu and the upper chamber was named Riiginõukogu. Both chambers were disbanded in 1940, following the Soviet occupation, and rigged elections for only the lower chamber Riigivolikogu were held. According to the 1992 Constitution of Estonia, the parliament is once again unicameral.

== India ==
=== State-level ===
The State Legislative Council or Vidhan Parishad is the upper house of the state legislature in India. The states of Assam, Jammu and Kashmir, Madhya Pradesh, Punjab, Tamil Nadu and West Bengal have abolished the Vidhan Parishad in their legislatures. The Vidhan Parishad of Andhra Pradesh was abolished in 1985 but revived again in 2007.

== New Zealand ==
The (appointed) New Zealand Legislative Council was abolished in 1951.

== Sweden ==
The Första kammaren was the upper house of the legislature of Sweden from 1866 to 1970 until an amendment was made to the 1809 Instrument of Government in the 1970 general election.

== United States ==
=== State-level ===
Nebraska is the only state in the United States to have a unicameral legislature, which it achieved when it abolished its lower house instead of the upper house in 1934. For this reason, state legislators in Nebraska are sometimes called "senators", as the Nebraska State Senate has been the sole house of the state legislature since the Nebraska State House of Representatives permanently dissolved in 1937. During the governorship of Jesse Ventura in Minnesota, he called for the state to have a unicameral legislature, but these plans never materialized.

== Other countries ==
The former Mineiro Senate

Costa Rica (1847-1871 and 1919), five states of Brazil [Bahia, Ceará, Pernambuco, Minas Gerais, São Paulo (1930)], Republic of China (Taiwan) (1993), Croatia (2001), Greece (1935), Hungary, South Korea (1960), Portugal (1926), Turkey (1980), Venezuela (1999), and Mauritania (2017) once possessed upper houses but abolished them to adopt unicameral systems.

In October 2013, a constitutional referendum in the Republic of Ireland proposed the establishment a unicameral system by abolishing Seanad Éireann, the upper house of parliament. The proposal was narrowly rejected by a margin of 51.7% against vs. 48.3% in favour.

In June 2025, the Belgian federal government reached an agreement in which it stated that the Senate will be abolished in 2029. The responsibilities of the senators will be transferred to the lower house.

== See also ==
- List of abolished lower houses
- Unicameralism
