= List of provincial legislatures in Argentina =

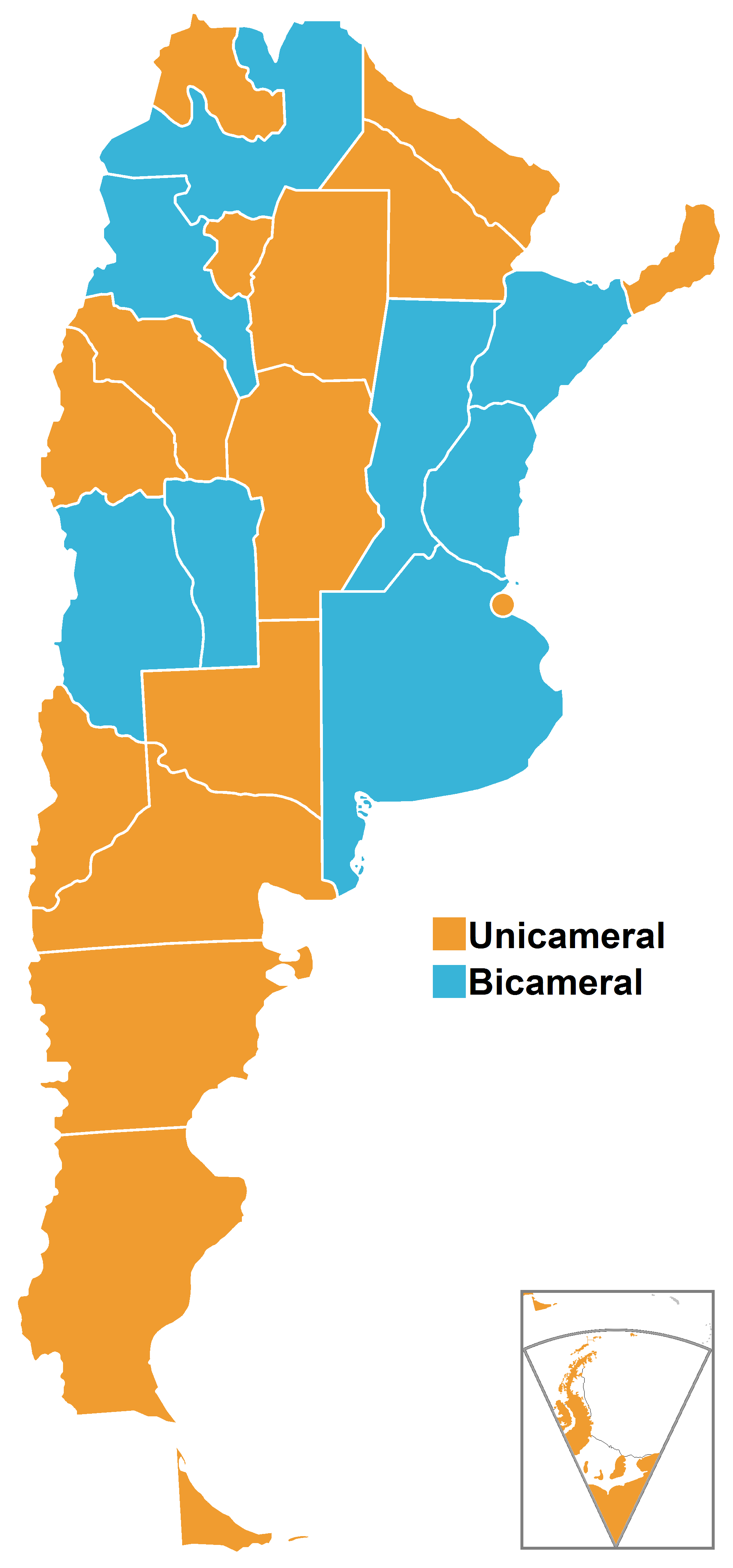
Provincial legislatures in Argentina by number of chambers

The provincial legislatures of Argentina are the organs of the legislative power of each province. There are provinces with a chamber of deputies and senate, and others with a unicameral system. The total number of provincial legislators in Argentina is 1199.

Each province has the autonomy to decide the date of the provincial elections.

== Composition by province ==
Province	Legislature		Level	Seats	Term (years)	Renewal	Electoral system	Constituency
Buenos Aires Province	Legislature	Chamber of Deputies	Lower	92	4	Half every 2 years	Proportional representation	Electoral sections
Buenos Aires Province	Legislature	Senate	Upper	46	4	Half every 2 years	Proportional representation	Electoral sections
Buenos Aires	Legislature		Unicameral	60	4	Half every 2 years	Proportional representation	City
Catamarca	Legislature	Chamber of Deputies	Lower	41	4	Half every 2 years	Proportional representation	Province
Catamarca	Legislature	Senate	Upper	16	4	Half every 2 years	First-past-the-post voting	Departments
Chaco	Chamber of Deputies		Unicameral	32	4	Half every 2 years	Proportional representation	Province
Chubut	Legislature		Unicameral	27	4	Complete	16: Majority bonus system; 11: Proportional representation	Province
Córdoba	Legislature		Unicameral	70	4	Complete	Parallel voting:	
Córdoba	Legislature		Unicameral	70	4	Complete	44: Proportional representation	Province
Córdoba	Legislature		Unicameral	70	4	Complete	26: First-past-the-post voting	Departments
Corrientes	Legislature	Chamber of Deputies	Lower	30	4	Half every 2 years	Proportional representation	Province
Corrientes	Legislature	Senate	Upper	15	6	A third every 2 years	Proportional representation	Province
Entre Ríos	Legislature	Chamber of Deputies	Lower	34	4	Complete	18: Majority bonus system; 16: Proportional representation	Province
Entre Ríos	Legislature	Senate	Upper	17	4	Complete	First-past-the-post voting	Departments
Formosa	Chamber of Deputies		Unicameral	30	4	Half every 2 years	Incomplete list. 2/3 of seats for top party, 1/3 of seats for second most voted party	Province
Jujuy	Legislature		Unicameral	48	4	Half every 2 years	Proportional representation	Province
La Pampa	Chamber of Deputies		Unicameral	30	4	Complete	Proportional representation	Province
La Rioja	Legislature		Unicameral	36	4	Half every 2 years	24: Proportional representation	Departments
La Rioja	Legislature		Unicameral	36	4	Half every 2 years	12: First-past-the-post voting	Departments
Mendoza	Legislature	Chamber of Deputies	Lower	48	4	Half every 2 years	Proportional representation	Electoral districts
Mendoza	Legislature	Senate	Upper	38	4	Half every 2 years	Proportional representation	Electoral districts
Misiones	Chamber of Representatives		Unicameral	40	4	Half every 2 years	Proportional representation	Province
Neuquén	Legislature		Unicameral	35	4	Complete	Proportional representation	Province
Río Negro	Legislature		Unicameral	46	4	Complete	Parallel voting:	
Río Negro	Legislature		Unicameral	46	4	Complete	22: Proportional representation	Province
Río Negro	Legislature		Unicameral	46	4	Complete	24: Proportional representation	Electoral circuits
Salta	Legislature	Chamber of Deputies	Lower	60	4	Half every 2 years	47: Proportional representation	Departments
Salta	Legislature	Chamber of Deputies	Lower	60	4	Half every 2 years	13: First-past-the-post voting	Departments
Salta	Legislature	Senate	Upper	23	4	Half every 2 years	First-past-the-post voting	Departments
San Juan	Chamber of Deputies		Unicameral	36	4	Complete	Parallel voting:	
San Juan	Chamber of Deputies		Unicameral	36	4	Complete	17: Proportional representation	Province
San Juan	Chamber of Deputies		Unicameral	36	4	Complete	19: First-past-the-post voting	Departments
San Luis	Legislature	Chamber of Deputies	Lower	43	4	Half every 2 years	Proportional representation	Departments
San Luis	Legislature	Senate	Upper	9	4	Half every 2 years	First-past-the-post voting	Departments
Santa Cruz	Chamber of Deputies		Unicameral	24	4	Complete	Parallel voting:	
Santa Cruz	Chamber of Deputies		Unicameral	24	4	Complete	10: Proportional representation	Province
Santa Cruz	Chamber of Deputies		Unicameral	24	4	Complete	14: First-past-the-post voting	Municipalities
Santa Fe	Legislature	Chamber of Deputies	Lower	50	4	Complete	28: Majority bonus system; 22: Proportional representation	Province
Santa Fe	Legislature	Senate	Upper	19	4	Complete	First-past-the-post voting	Departments
Santiago del Estero	Chamber of Deputies		Unicameral	40	4	Complete	Proportional representation	Province
Tierra del Fuego	Legislature		Unicameral	15	4	Complete	Proportional representation	Province
Tucumán	Legislature		Unicameral	49	4	Complete	Proportional representation	Electoral sections

== See also ==
- National Congress of Argentina
  - Argentine Senate
  - Argentine Chamber of Deputies
