= Legislature of Mendoza =

Provincial legislature in Argentina

Provincial legislature of Mendoza

Type
- Type: Bicameral
- Houses: Upper house: Senate of Mendoza; Lower house: Chamber of Deputies of Mendoza
- Established: 1916

The Legislature of Mendoza (Spanish: Legislatura de la Provincia de Mendoza) is the local legislature of the Argentinian province of Mendoza. It is a bicameral body, comprising the Chamber of Deputies of Mendoza (48 members), and the Senate of Mendoza (38 members). It is one of eight bicameral legislatures in the country.

It is elected by a general provincial proportional representation and renewed every 2 years by electing a new half of each house. Each representative serves a four-year term. The Provincial Constitution denotes its legislative powers.

The Legislature meets in the provincial capital. The building where the Mendoza Legislature currently operates is a cultural heritage of the Province built in 1889, as a Social Club of the Mendoza ruling class, designed by Federico Knoll.

== See also ==
- List of provincial legislatures in Argentina
- Parliament of Argentina
