= Legislature of San Luis =

Provincial legislature in Argentina

Provincial legislature of San Luis

Type
- Type: Bicameral
- Houses: Upper house: Senate of San Luis; Lower house: Chamber of Deputies of San Luis

The Legislature of San Luis (Spanish: Legislatura de la Provincia de San Luis) is the local legislature of the Argentinian province of San Luis. It is a bicameral body, comprising the 43 members of the Chamber of Deputies of San Luis, and the Senate of San Luis with 9 members. It is one of eight bicameral legislatures in the country.

It is elected by a general provincial first-past-the-post voting (Senate), proportional representation (Chamber), and renewed every 2 years by electing a new half of each house. Each representative serves a four-year term. The Provincial Constitution denotes its legislative powers.

The Legislature meets in the provincial capital.

== See also ==
- List of provincial legislatures in Argentina
- Parliament of Argentina
