= Tala Department =

Tala Departamento Tala
- Department
- Location of Tala Department within Entre Ríos Province
- Country: Argentina
- Province: Entre Ríos Province
- Seat: Rosario del Tala

Area
  - Total: 2,663 km^{2} (1,028 sq mi)

Population (2022)
  - Total: 31,309
  - Density: 11.76/km^{2} (30.45/sq mi)

Tala is a department of the province of Entre Ríos, Argentina. Its administrative seat is the city of Rosario del Tala.
