= Legislature of Catamarca =

Provincial legislature in Argentina

Provincial legislature of Catamarca

Type
- Type: Bicameral
- Houses: Upper house: Senate of Catamarca; Lower house: Chamber of Deputies of Catamarca

The Legislature of Catamarca (Spanish: Legislatura de la Provincia de Catamarca) is the local legislature of the Argentinian province of Catamarca. It is a bicameral body, comprising the Chamber of Deputies of Catamarca (41 representative), and the Senate of Catamarca (16 members). It is one of eight bicameral legislatures in the country.

The Senate of Catamarca as elected in 2025.

It is elected by a general provincial first-past-the-post voting (Senate) and proportional representation for the Chamber, renewed every 2 years by electing a new half of each house. Each representative serves a four-year term. The Provincial Constitution denotes its legislative powers.

The Legislature meets in the provincial capital, Ciudad de Catamarca.

The political parties currently represented in the Legislature are Frente de Todos (represented with light blue), La Libertad Avanza (purple), Unión Civica Radical (red), Movimiento de Integración y Desarrollo (black), Somos Provincias Unidas (orange - represented with mauve below), Fuerza Catamarca (green), and Propuesta Republicana (yellow).

The Chamber of Deputies of Catamarca as elected in 2025.

== See also ==
- List of provincial legislatures in Argentina
- Parliament of Argentina
