= Legislature of Entre Ríos =

Provincial legislature in Argentina

Provincial legislature of Entre Ríos

Type
- Type: Bicameral
- Houses: Upper house: Senate of Entre Ríos; Lower house: Chamber of Deputies of Entre Ríos

Meeting place
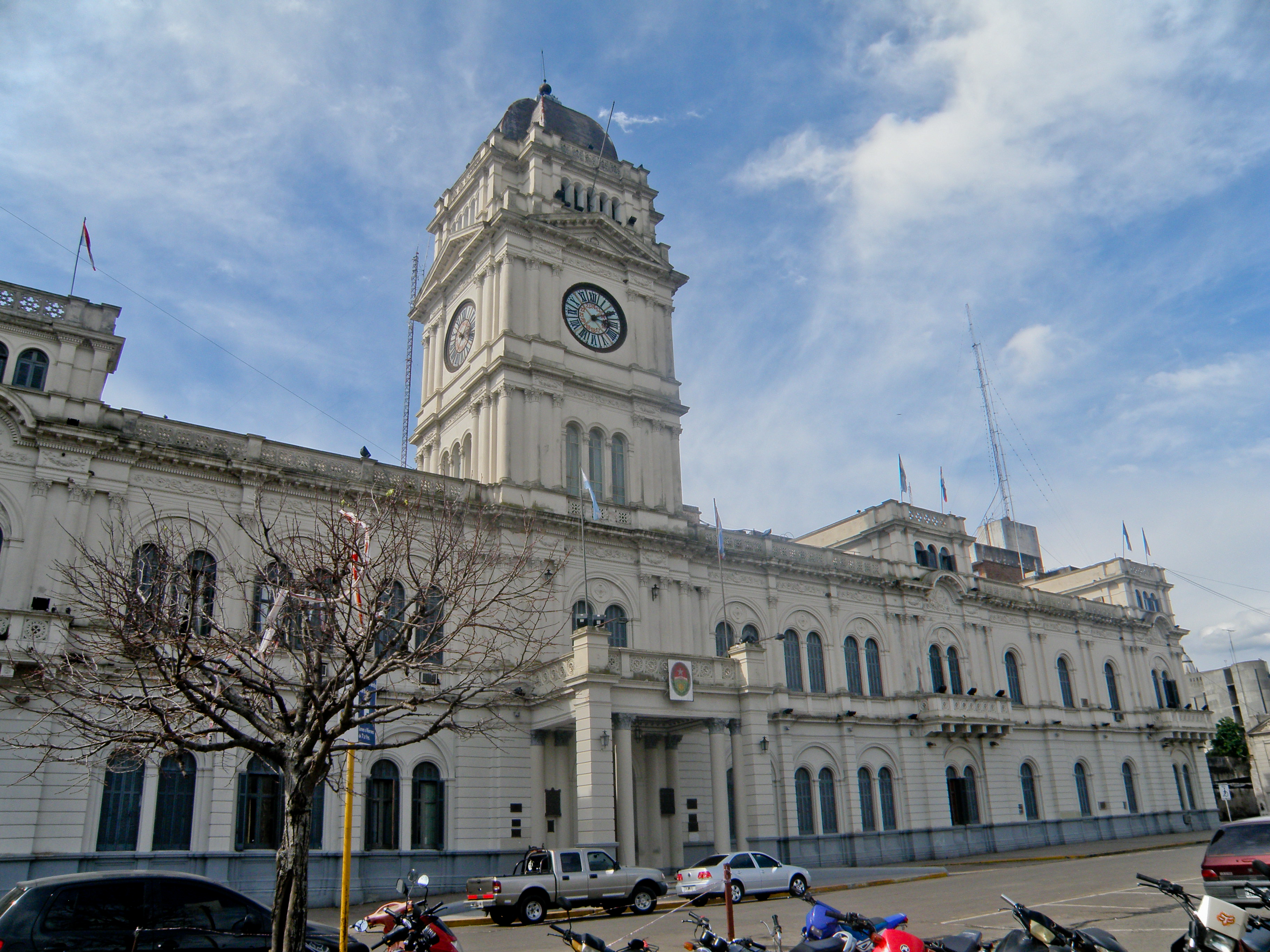
- Legislative Palace, Entre Ríos Province

The Legislature of Entre Ríos (Spanish: Legislatura de la Provincia de Entre Ríos) is the local legislature of the Argentinian province of Entre Ríos. It is a bicameral body, comprising the Chamber of Deputies of Entre Ríos (34 members), and the Senate of Entre Ríos (17 members). It is one of eight bicameral legislatures in the country.

It is elected by a general provincial first-past-the-post voting (Senate), mixed bonus system and proportional representation for the Chamber, and renewed fully every 4 years. The Provincial Constitution denotes its legislative powers.

The Legislature meets in the provincial capital.

== See also ==
- List of provincial legislatures in Argentina
- Parliament of Argentina
