= Waiapu =

Waiapu is a name used in the East Coast of the North Island of New Zealand, and may refer to:

- Waiapu River, a river flowing from the Raukumara Range to Rangitukia in the East Coast
- Waiapu Valley, the catchment area for Waiapu River and its tributaries
- Waiapu (New Zealand electorate), a former electorate in the Gisborne/East Coast region of New Zealand from 1893 to 1908
- Waiapu Ward, a Ward of the Gisborne District
- Diocese of Waiapu, a diocese of the Anglican Church approximately covering the Gisborne and Hawke's Bay regions
- Waiapu County, one of the former counties of New Zealand
