= Mangaoparo River =

- Route of the Mangaoparo River
- Mouth of the Mangaoparo River Mangaoparo River (North Island)

Location
- Country: New Zealand
- Island: North Island
- Region: Gisborne

Physical characteristics
- Source
  - location: Mount Raukūmara
  - coordinates: 37.76386°S 178.12649°E
- Mouth: Waiapu River
  - coordinates: 37°51′18″S 178°20′24″E

Basin features
- Progression: Mangaoparo River → Waiapu River → Pacific Ocean
- Tributaries
  - left: Ōruatāmaru Stream, Weraamaia Stream
  - right: Mangaehu Stream, Mangawhero Stream

The Mangaoparo River is a river of the Gisborne District of New Zealand's North Island. It is located close to the island's northeasternmost point, flowing southeast from the slopes of Mount Raukūmara in the Raukūmara Range to reach the Waiapu River 5 kilometres (3 mi) northeast of Ruatoria.

== See also ==
- List of rivers of New Zealand
