= Aorangiwai River =

- Route of the Aorangiwai River
- Mouth of the Aorangiwai River Aorangiwai River (North Island)

Location
- Country: New Zealand
- Island: North Island
- Region: Gisborne

Physical characteristics
- Source
  - coordinates: 37.92619°S 178.12323°E
- Mouth: Mata River
  - coordinates: 37°55′44″S 178°13′13″E
  - elevation: 98 m (322 ft)

Basin features
- Progression: Aorangiwai River → Mata River → Waiapu River → Pacific Ocean
- Tributaries
  - left: Kuratawhiti Stream

The Aorangiwai River is a small river in the Gisborne district of New Zealand. It is a tributary of the Mata River which it flows into about 10 kilometres (6 mi) upstream of Ruatoria.

== See also ==
- List of rivers of New Zealand
