= Ihungia River =

- Route of the Ihungia River
- Mouth of the Ihungia River Ihungia River (North Island)

Location
- Country: New Zealand
- Island: North Island
- Region: Gisborne

Physical characteristics
- Source: Whakauranga
  - coordinates: 38.11791°S 178.14056°E
- Mouth: Mata River
  - coordinates: 37°58′55″S 178°10′00″E
- Length: 14 km (8.7 mi)

Basin features
- Progression: Ihungia River → Mata River → Waiapu River → Pacific Ocean
- Tributaries
  - left: Waihua Stream, Te Kākā Stream, Kouetumarae Stream, Te Matarau Stream, Mangarākeke Stream
  - right: Waipapa Stream, Karikarihuata Stream, Mangara Stream
- Bridges: Ihungia Road Bridge

The Ihungia River is a river of the northeastern North Island of New Zealand. It flows north from its source inland from Te Puia Springs, joining with the Mata River 15 kilometres (9 mi) southwest of Ruatoria.

== See also ==
- List of rivers of New Zealand
