= Waiorongomai River (Gisborne) =

- Route of the Waiorongomai River
- Mouth of the Waiorongomai River Waiorongomai River (Gisborne) (North Island)

Location
- Country: New Zealand
- Island: North Island
- Region: Gisborne

Physical characteristics
- Source: Raukūmara Range
  - coordinates: 37.77575°S 178.11979°E
  - elevation: 1,160 metres (3,810 ft)
- Mouth: Tapuaeroa River
  - coordinates: 37°51′57″S 178°11′56″E
  - elevation: 120 metres (390 ft)
- Length: 16 km (9.9 mi)

Basin features
- Progression: Waiorongomai River → Tapuaeroa River → Waiapu River → Pacific Ocean
- Tributaries
  - left: Mangarara Stream
- Bridges: Waiorongomai Bridge

The Waiorongomai River is a river of the Gisborne Region of New Zealand's North Island. It rises on the southern slopes of Mount Raukūmara, flowing generally southeast to reach the Tapuaeroa River ten kilometres west of Ruatoria.

== See also ==
- List of rivers of New Zealand
