= New Zealand geologic time scale =

System of dividing geologic time in New Zealand

While also using the international geologic time scale, many nations–especially those with isolated and therefore non-standard prehistories–use their own systems of dividing geologic time into epochs and faunal stages.

International geologic time scale for context with proportional representation of eons/eonothems and eras/erathems mentioned on this page. Currently we are in the Cenozoic (abbreviated to Cz) era. The image also shows some notable events in Earth's history and the general evolution of life. Ma represents one million Earth years.

In New Zealand, these epochs and stages use local place names (mainly Māori in origin) back to the Permian. Prior to this time, names mostly align to those in the Australian geologic time scale, and are not divided into epochs. In practice, these earlier terms are rarely used, as most New Zealand geology is of a more recent origin. In all cases, New Zealand uses the same periods as those used internationally; the renaming only applies to subdivisions of these periods. Very few epochs and stages cross international period boundaries, and the exceptions are almost all within the Cenozoic Era. New Zealand updates will always be behind any significant international updates in the International Geological Time Scale.

Although the New Zealand geologic time scale has not been formally adopted, it has been widely used by earth scientists, geologists and palaeontologists in New Zealand since J. S. Crampton proposed it in 1995. The most recent calibrated update was in 2015.

A standard abbreviation is used for these epochs and stages. These are usually in the form Xx, where the first letter is the initial letter of the epoch and the second (lower-case) letter is the initial letter of the stage. These are noted beside the stage names in the list below.

Currently, from the New Zealand perspective we are in the Haweran stage of the Wanganui epoch which is within the internationally defined Holocene epoch of the Quaternary period of the Cenozoic era. The Haweran, which started some 340,000 years ago, is named after the North Island town of Hāwera. The New Zealand stages and epochs are not the same as internationally defined periods and epochs (e.g. the Wanganui epoch started at 5.33 Ma which is within the Neogene period and matches the start of the international Pliocene epoch, but contains also the international Holocene and Pleistocene epochs).

== List of New Zealand geologic time epochs and stages ==
Times given indicate the start of the respective stages and epochs. Several of these stages are further divided into upper and lower or upper, middle, and lower, although this has not been noted below unless unique names have been given to these sub-stages. As with the international geologic scale, these epochs and stages are largely named for locales where rock dating from these time periods is in evidence, with stage names predominantly but not always named for locales close to their epoch's namesake site. Where known, these places are also linked in the list below.

=== Cenozoic Era ===
| Name | Abbreviation | Start date (Ma) | International equivalent | Named after |
| Wanganui epoch | W | 5.33 | Pliocene, Pleistocene and Holocene | Wanganui (Wanganui Basin) |
| Haweran stage | Wq | 0.34 | | Hāwera |
| Castlecliffian stage | Wc | 1.63 | | Castlecliff (suburb of Wanganui) |
| Nukumaruan stage | Wn | 2.40 | | Nukumaru, near Waitotara |
| Mangapanian stage | Wm | 3.00 | | Mangapani, near Waitotara |
| Waipipian stage | Wp | 3.70 | | Waipipi Beach, near Waverley |
| Opoitian stage | Wo | 5.33 | | Opoiti, near Wairoa |
| Taranaki epoch | T | 11.04 | Upper Miocene | Taranaki |
| Kapitean stage | Tk | 7.2 | | Kapitea Creek, near Kumara |
| Tongaporutuan stage | Tt | 11.04 | | Tongaporutu |
| Southland epoch | S | 15.9 | Middle Miocene | Southland |
| Waiauan stage | Sw | 13.05 | | Waiau River |
| Lillburnian stage | Sl | 15.1 | | Lill Burn |
| Clifdenian stage | Sc | 15.9 | | Clifden |
| Pareora epoch | P | 21.7 | Lower Miocene | Pareora |
| Altonian stage | Pl | 18.7 | | Alton Burn |
| Otaian stage | Po | 21.7 | | Otaio |
| Landon epoch | L | 34.6 | Oligocene to Lower Miocene | Landon Creek, Pukeuri |
| Waitakian stage | Lw | 25.2 | | Waitaki River |
| Duntroonian stage | Ld | 27.3 | | Duntroon |
| Whaingaroan stage | Lwh | 34.6 | | Whaingaroa (Raglan Harbour) |
| Arnold epoch | A | 42.6 | Middle to Upper Eocene | Arnold River |
| Runangan stage | Ar | 36.7 | | Runanga |
| Kaiatan stage | Ak | 39.1 | | Kaiata, near Greymouth |
| Bortonian stage | Ab | 42.6 | | Bortons |
| Dannevirke epoch | D | 66.0 | Lower Palaeocene to Middle Eocene | Dannevirke |
| Porangan stage | Dp | 45.7 | | Poranga |
| Heretaungan stage | Dh | 48.9 | | Heretaunga |
| Mangaorapan stage | Dm | 52.0 | | Mangaorapa, southern Hawke's Bay |
| Waipawan stage | Dw | 56.0 | | Waipawa |
| Teurian stage | Dt | 66.0 | | Te Uri |

=== Mesozoic Era ===
==== Cretaceous Period ====
| Name | Abbreviation | Start date (Ma) | Named after |
| Mata epoch | M | 86.5 | |
| Haumurian stage | Mh | 83.6 | Haumuri Bluff |
| Piripauan stage | Mp | 86.5 | Piripaua (Spyglass Point), Kaikōura District |
| Raukumara epoch | R | 95.2 | Raukumara Range |
| Teratan stage | Rt | 90.5 | Te Rata, Gisborne District |
| Mangaotanean stage | Rm | 93.7 | Mangaotane, Gisborne District |
| Arowhanan stage | Ra | 95.2 | Arowhana, Gisborne District |
| Clarence epoch | C | 108.4 | Waiau Toa / Clarence River |
| Ngaterian stage | Cn | 99.5 | Ngateretere, Bay of Plenty Region |
| Motuan stage | Cm | 103.3 | Motu River |
| Urutawan stage | Cu | 108.4 | Urutawa, a hill north of Matawai |
| Taitai epoch | U | 145.0 | Taitai, a hill near Ruatoria |
| Korangan stage | Uk | 117.5 | Koranga River |
| Undifferentiated Taitai | | 145.0 | |

==== Jurassic Period ====
| Name | Abbreviation | Start date (Ma) | Named after |
| Oteke epoch | O | 150.0 | Otaka Stream, Waikato |
| Puaroan stage | Op | 150.0 | Puaroa Stream, Waikato |
| Kawhia epoch | K | 176.0 | Kawhia Harbour |
| Ohauan stage | Ko | 154.5 | Nathan Point/Ohaua, Kawhia Harbour |
| Heterian stage | Kh | 164.3 | Heteri Point, Kawhia Harbour |
| Temaikan stage | Kt | 176.0 | Te Maika, Kawhia Harbour |
| Herangi epoch | H | 201.3 | Herangi, Aotea Harbour |
| Ururoan stage | Hu | 188.9 | Ururoa Point, Kawhia Harbour |
| Aratauran stage | Ha | 201.3 | Arataura Point, near Kawhia Harbour |

==== Triassic Period ====
| Name | Abbreviation | Start date (Ma) | Named after |
| Balfour epoch | B | 227.5 | Balfour |
| Otapirian stage | Bo | 208.5 | Otapiri, near Winton |
| Warepan stage | Bw | 217.0 | Warepa, near Balclutha |
| Otamitan stage | Bm | 221.0 | Otamita Stream, Hokonui Hills |
| Oretian stage | Br | 227.5 | Ōreti River |
| Gore epoch | G | 251.5 | Gore |
| Kaihikuan stage | Gk | 238.0 | Kaihiku Stream, The Catlins |
| Etalian stage | Ge | 246.0 | Etal Hill, north of Nightcaps |
| Malakovian stage | Gm | 249.0 | Malakoff Hill, near Ohai |
| Nelsonian stage | Gn | 251.5 | Nelson |
| Makarewan stage (see Permian Period, below) | | | |

=== Palaeozoic Era ===
==== Permian Period ====
| Name | Abbreviation | Start date (Ma) | Named after |
| D'Urville epoch | YD | 259.8 | D'Urville Island |
| Makarewan stage | YDm | 253.2 | Makarewa River |
| Waiitian stage | YDw | 254.2 | Wai-iti River |
| Puruhauan stage | YDp | 259.8 | Puruhaua Stream, The Catlins |
| Aparima epoch | YA | 288.5 | Aparima River |
| Flettian stage | YAf | 266.0 | Flett's Hut, Takitimu Range |
| Barettian stage | YAr | 276.0 | Barrett's Hut, Takitimu Range |
| Mangapirian stage | YAm | 285.0 | Mangapiri Downs, east of Lake Monowai |
| Telfordian stage | YAt | 288.5 | Telford Burn, Takitimu Range |
| Pre-Telfordian epoch (not subdivided into stages) | Ypt | 298.9 | |

==== Carboniferous Period ====
| Name | Abbreviation | Start date (Ma) |
| Carboniferous Period (not subdivided) | F | 358.9 |

==== Devonian Period ====
Stages prior to the beginning of the Carboniferous Period use either international (Devonian/Silurian) or Australian (Ordovician/Cambrian) geologic stage names; very little New Zealand rock is known from these geologic periods.

| Name | Abbreviation | Start date (Ma) |
| Upper or Late Devonian epoch | JU | 382.7 |
| Famennian stage | Jfa | 372.2 |
| Frasnian stage | Jfr | 382.7 |
| Middle or Mid Devonian epoch | JM | 293.3 |
| Givetian stage | Jgi | 387.7 |
| Eifelian stage | Jei | 393.3 |
| Lower or Early Devonian epoch | JL | 419.2 |
| Emsian stage | Jem | 407.6 |
| Pragian stage | Jpr | 410.8 |
| Lochkovian stage | Jlo | 419.2 |

==== Silurian Period ====
| Name | Abbreviation | Start date (Ma) |
| Pridoli epoch (not subdivided into stages) | Epr | 423.0 |
| Ludlow epoch | Elu | |
| Ludfordian stage | Eld | 425.6 |
| Gorstian stage | Ego | 427.4 |
| Wenlock epoch | Ewe | |
| Homerian stage | | 430.5 |
| Sheinwoodian stage | | 433.4 |
| Llandovery epoch | Ela | |
| Telychian stage | | 438.5 |
| Aeronian stage | | 440.8 |
| Rhuddanian stage | | 443.8 |

==== Ordovician Period ====
| Name | Abbreviation | Start date (Ma) |
| Late or Upper Ordovician epoch | | |
| Bolindian stage | Vbo | 448.4 |
| Eastonian stage | Vea | 453.0 |
| Gisbornian stage | Vgi | 448.4 |
| Middle Ordovician epoch | | |
| Darriwilian stage | Vda | 467.3 |
| Yapeenian stage | Vya | 468.3 |
| Castlemainian stage | Vca | 470.0 |
| Early or Lower Ordovician epoch | | |
| Chewtonian stage | Vch | 472.4 |
| Bendigonian stage | Vbe | 476.0 |
| Lancefieldian stage | Vla | 484.3 |
| Warendan stage | Vwa | 485.4 |

==== Cambrian Period ====
| Name | Abbreviation | Start date (Ma) |
| Datsonian stage | Xda | 486.8 |
| Payntonian stage | Xpa | 489.5 |
| Iverian stage | Xiv | 494.0 |
| Idamean stage | Xid | 497.0 |
| Mindyallan stage | Xmi | 499.0 |
| Boomerangian stage | Xbo | 500.5 |
| Undillan stage | Xun | 503.0 |
| Floran stage | Xfl | 504.5 |
| Templetonian stage | Xte | 508.0 |
| Ordian stage | Xor | 511.5 |
| Early Cambrian (not subdivided) | XL | 542.0 |

=== Proterozoic, Archaean and Hadaean Aeons ===
| Name | Abbreviation | Start date (Ma) |
| (Not subdivided) | Z | ~4600 |

=== Footnotes to time scale ===
1. This stage is sometimes further divided into Mangaoran (lower) and Waikatoan (upper). These are named after Mangaora Inlet (an arm of Kawhia Harbour) and the Waikato River.
2. This stage is sometimes further divided into Kiriteherean (lower) and Marokopan (upper). These are named after the Marokopa River and the nearby Kiritehere Stream.
3. Until the late 1960s, the Flettian and Barettian stages were together known as the Braxtonian stage (see Waterhouse 1969). This was named for Braxton Burn, a stream near Mossburn.
4. Where not subdivided usual reason is no stages recognised due to absent record

== See also ==
- Stratigraphy of New Zealand
