= Melanella geoffreyi =

Scientific classification
- Kingdom: Animalia
- Phylum: Mollusca
- Class: Gastropoda
- Subclass: Caenogastropoda
- Order: Littorinimorpha
- Family: Eulimidae
- Genus: Melanella
- Species: †M. geoffreyi

Binomial name
- †Melanella geoffreyi (Laws, 1936)

Synonyms
- † Balcis geoffreyi Laws, 1936 (superseded combination)

Species of gastropod

Melanella geoffreyi is an extinct species of sea snail, a marine gastropod mollusk in the family Eulimidae.

== Distribution ==
Fossils of this species are endemic of New Zealand and were found in Waitotaran strata.
