= Mount Hikurangi (Gisborne District) =

Mountain in New Zealand

- Te Ara ki Hikurangi (Māori)
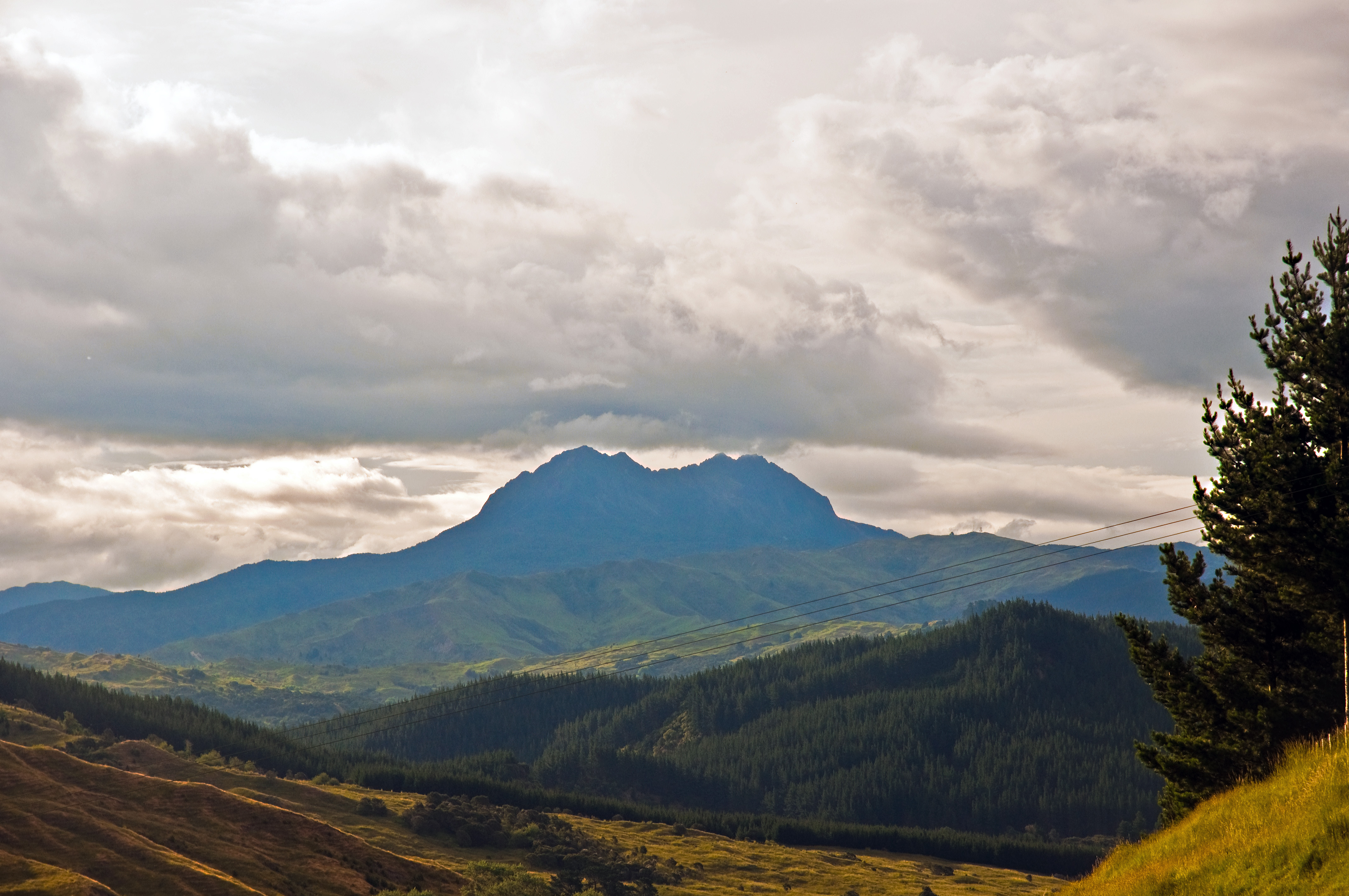
- Mount Hikurangi, as seen from the Waiapu Valley

Highest point
- Elevation: 1,752 m (5,748 ft)
- Prominence: 1,183 m (3,881 ft)
- Listing: List of mountains of New Zealand by height
- Coordinates: 37°55′1.49″S 178°3′36.20″E

Geography
- Location within North Island
- Location: Gisborne District, New Zealand
- Parent range: Raukūmara Range

Mount Hikurangi (or Te Ara ki Hikurangi in Māori) is a 1,752 m (5,748 ft) peak in the eastern corner of New Zealand's North Island, about 80 kilometres (50 mi) north of Gisborne, and 50 kilometres (31 mi) southwest of the East Cape Lighthouse. On a spur of the Raukūmara Range in the Waiapu Valley, it is the North Island's highest non-volcanic peak.

Mount Hikurangi is within the rohe of Ngāti Porou and Ngati Uēpohatu and is the iwi's most significant icon. In Māori mythology, it was the first part of the North Island to emerge when Māui pulled it as a giant fish from the ocean. According to these beliefs, his waka, Nukutaimemeha, became stranded on the mountain, and lies petrified between the mountain's peaks in Lake Hinetakawhiti.

Nearby summits include Whanokao (1,428 m or 4,685 ft), Aorangi (1,272 m or 4,173 ft), Wharekia (1,106 m or 3,629 ft) and Taitai (678 m or 2,224 ft). Together, these mountains provide what Te Ara: The Encyclopedia of New Zealand calls an "awe-inspiring vista".

The early arrivals to Aotearoa commonly gave Polynesian ancestral names and symbolism to New Zealand places. Hikurangi and Aorangi were a pair of names transferred from Tahiti via Rarotonga to different parts of New Zealand Tahiti has a Mount Hiurai (Hi’ura’i/Hikurangi) at the summit of Mehetia (Me’eti’a) island. Rarotonga has Ikurangi, and maybe the origin of all these names is Si'ulagi(Si'ulangi)in Ta'u, Samoa.

== The first sunrise of the new day ==
The peak is traditionally regarded as the first land in the world to catch the rays of the new day's sun, although this claim, like any such claim of its type, is open to interpretation. Certainly it is not true at any time of the year other than the Southern Hemisphere summer, as both Fiji and Tonga are to the east. In summer, however, because of the tilt of the Earth's axis, it does receive the sun's rays earlier than these places It does not receive them earlier than the Chatham Islands (or, of course, Antarctica), however, and in midsummer some parts of the South Island mainland (such as the peaks of Banks Peninsula and Dunedin's Mount Cargill) receive the dawn's light at almost exactly the same time. This did not stop the mountain gaining world prominence in the celebrations for the new Millennium, however.

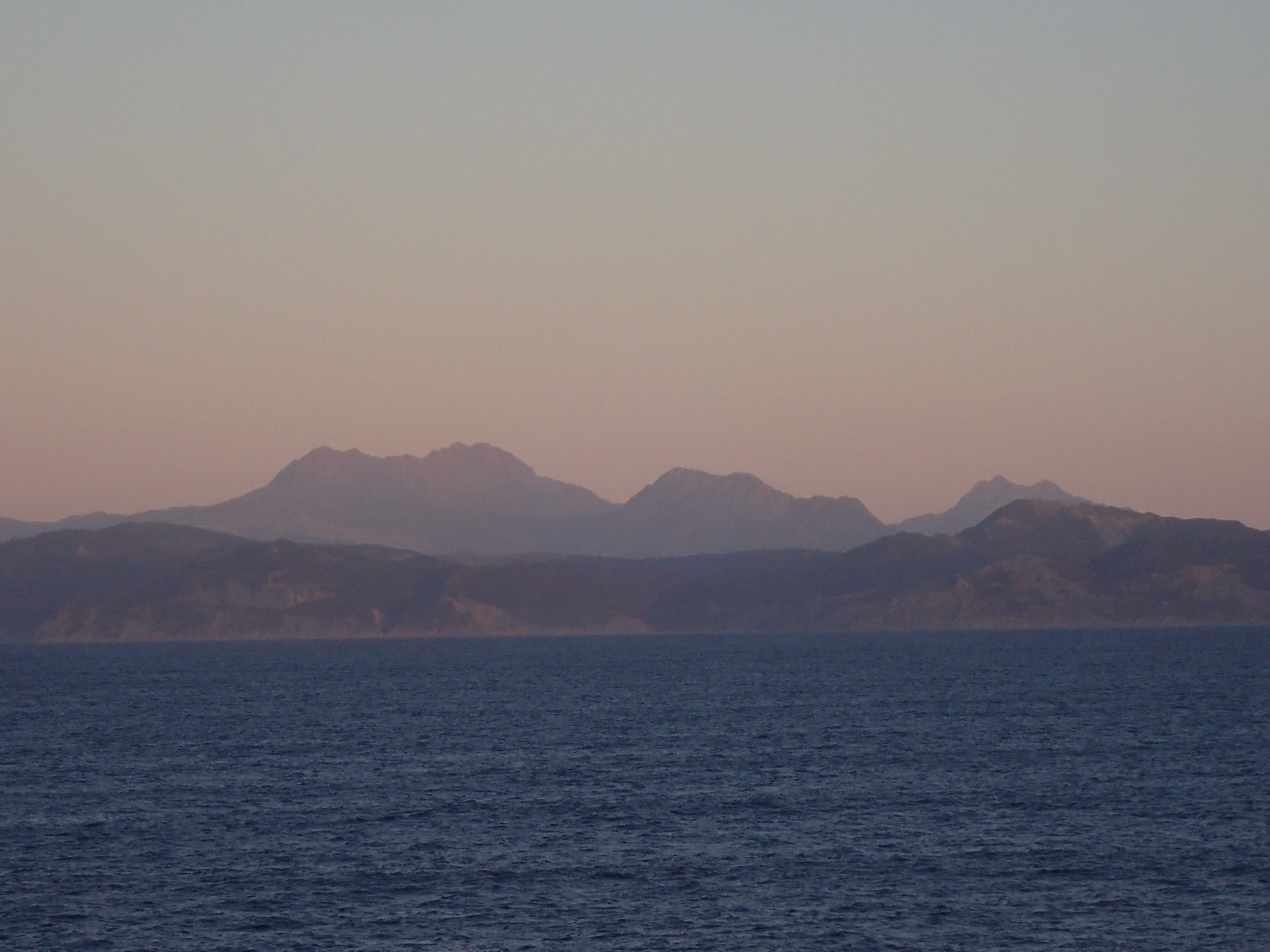
The first sun of a new day strikes the top of Hikurangi, East Cape, Aotearoa, New Zealand

According to the Department of Conservation, the mountain is "recognised and accepted as the first point on the mainland to greet the morning sun". The traditional greeting of South Island iwi Ngāi Tahu to North Island visitors, "Haere mai, e te Rāwhiti!" (Welcome, O Sunrise!), references this fact. Celebrations by Ngāti Porou to commemorate the first dawn of the new millennium in 2000, including karakia led by Tamati and Amster Reedy, took place on the summit of the mountain. In addition, nine massive whakairo (carvings) depicting Māui's story and his family were erected on the mountain as part of the celebrations. They were carved under Derek Lardelli's guidance by students from Toihoukura, the Eastern Institute of Technology's School of Māori Visual Arts.

== History ==
Before the arrival of Europeans, Mount Hikurangi was within Ngāti Porou's territory. Ngāti Porou believe they are descendants of Māui, and thus have had a connection with the mountain since it arose from the sea. In the 1870s, the Crown acquired the mountain and turned it into a state forest park. In November 1990, ownership of Mount Hikurangi was returned to Ngāti Porou, who now manage the mountain, and facilitate the public's access to it.

=== 19th-century gold prospecting ===
NB: This section is derived from text in Mackay, Joseph Angus (1949). Historic Poverty Bay and the East Coast, N.I., N.Z, available here at the New Zealand Electronic Text Centre.

There were several “gold rushes” on Mount Hikurangi in the early days of European settlement. In 1874, about 100 Māori went prospecting on and around Mount Hikurangi. However, Sir James Hector, who examined the Waiapu Valley, found no signs of gold. In 1875 “Scotty” Siddons, mate of the Beautiful Star, claimed to have met a Māori person on the East Coast who had a few ounces of gold. He, and a mate named Hill, found a lot of mundic on the north-west side of the mountain, but only outcrops of limestone on the higher slopes. In 1886 Reupane te Ana, of Makarika, discovered what he fondly imagined was an enormous deposit of gold in the area. With what Joseph Angus Mackay called “noble unselfishness”, he let all his friends into the secret. Drays, wheelbarrows and receptacles of all kinds were rushed to the scene, and large quantities of the “precious metal” were removed to a safe place. When it turned out that the metal was only mundic, Reupane became an object of ridicule, and, afterwards, was known as “Tommy Poorfellow.”

== Significance to Māori ==
Mount Hikurangi (Te Ara ki Hikurangi) is of great spiritual, cultural, and physical significance to Ngāti Porou. It is the iwi's most important icon, and in Māori mythology, was the first part of the North Island to emerge when Māui, an ancestor of Ngāti Porou, pulled it as a giant fish from the ocean. According to these beliefs, his waka, Nukutaimemeha, became stranded on the mountain, and lies petrified near the mountain's summit. Another of Ngāti Porou's mythological ancestors, Paikea, is also associated with the mountain. According to myth, Paikea's younger half-brother, Ruatapu, attempted to kill about 70 of his older kin ("brothers") at sea in Hawaiki to exact revenge on his father for belittling him as a low-born son of a slave. The massacre, called Te Huripūreiata, was survived only by Paikea, who called on the sea gods and ancestors to save him. Paikea travelled to New Zealand on the back of a whale, but Ruatapu sent a great flood, called Te Tai a Ruatapu, to kill the survivors in New Zealand. Mt. Hikurangi became a refuge for the people from this deluge.

The mountain is often referenced in Ngāti Porou's karakia (incantations), waiata (songs), haka (war dances), and pēpeha or whakatauākī (proverbs). Examples of these include:

- Ko Hikurangi te maunga, Ko Waiapu te awa, Ko Ngāti Porou te iwi (Hikurangi the mountain, Waiapu the river, Ngati Porou the people). Ngāti Porou's proverb of identity.
- He atua! He tangata! He atua! He tangata! Ho! (Behold, it is divine! It is human! It is divine! It is human! Ah!). Referring to Mt. Hikurangi, this is from the Ngāti Porou haka, Rūaumoko, named after the earthquake god.
- Whakaeteete mai ko Hikurangi (Thrusting upward, is Hikurangi). From the haka, Whakarongo ake ki te hīrea waha o Māui (Hearken to the faint call of the voice of Māui), celebrating the mythological rise of the mountain from the ocean.
- He kākā tāwari ki Hikurangi, he moki ki te moana ([A] kaka feeding on the tawari at Hikurangi, [is as fat as the] moki in the sea). This saying represents plentiful food.
- Ka rukuruku a Te Rangi-tāwaea i ōna pūeru (Te Rangi-tāwaea [a Ngāti Porou ancestor] dons his garments). Said when Mount Hikurangi is covered in snow.

Some famous Māori quotes involving Hikurangi include:

- Ehara a Hikurangi i te maunga haere (Hikurangi is not a travelling mountain). The mountain of Hikurangi did not have a legend involving movement, and Te Kani-a-Takirau referenced this to justify his unwillingness to leave the area when he turned down the Māori Kingship, also saying he was "a king already through [his] ancestors".
- Kāti, tukua mai ki Hikurangi, ki te maunga e tauria e te huka (Enough, let him come hither to Hikurangi, to the mountain on which rests the snow). Said by Te Aotaki, instructing his tribe to welcome Tūwhakairiora, who came to avenge the murder of Poroumātā, his grandfather, and no doubt to undergo tohi (a rite to cause bravery), and possibly marry one of his daughters. Another version of the quote is Tukuna mai ki a au, ki Hikurangi, te maunga e tauria ana e te huka (Let him come to me, to Hikurangi, the mountain covered with snow).

== Flora and fauna ==
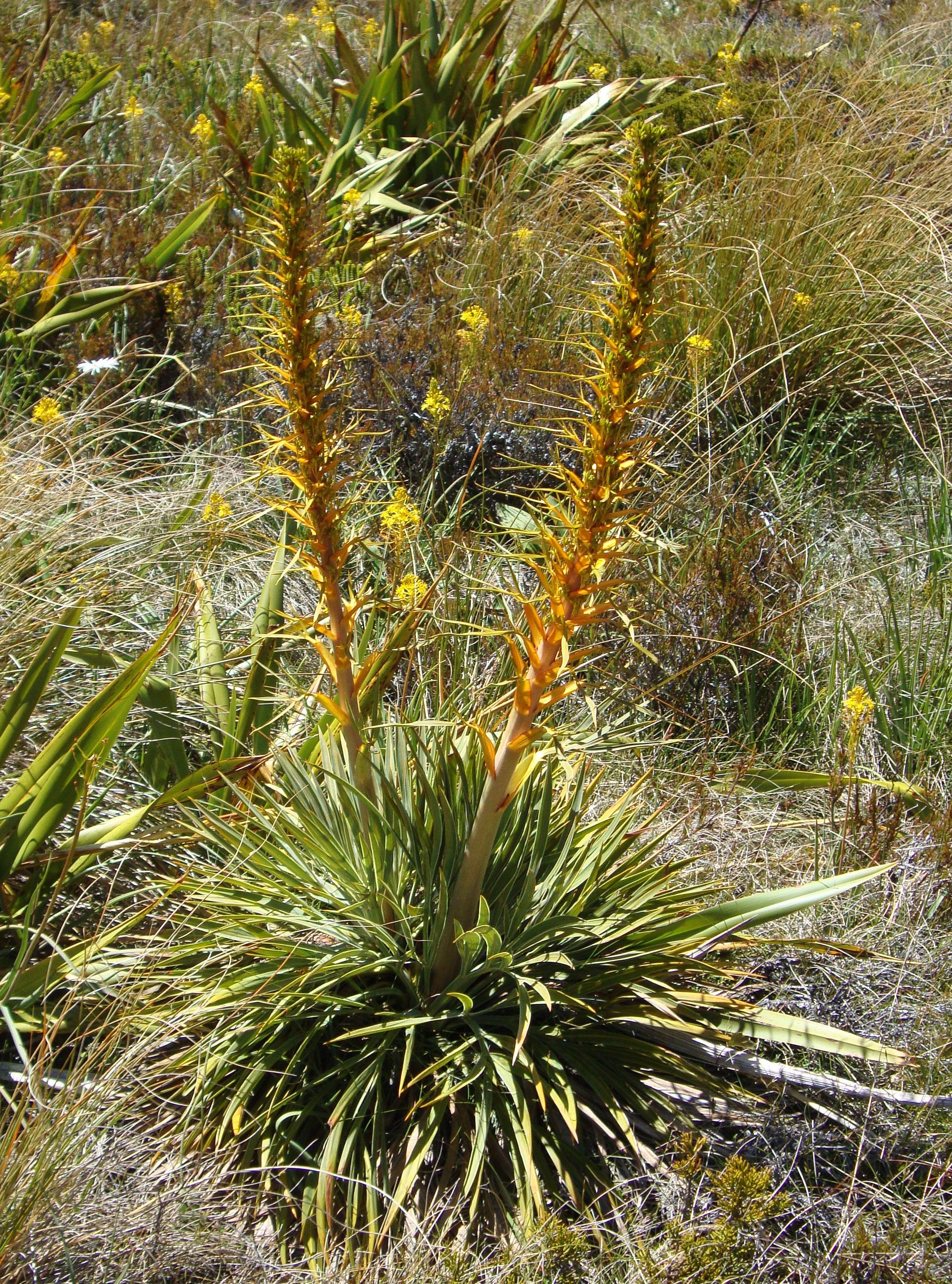
Aciphylla colensoi, one of the species of alpine plants found on Mount Hikurangi

The summit of Mount Hikurangi is the northernmost place where New Zealand's alpine vegetation can be seen. Among the alpine shrubs and delicate herbs found there are large buttercups (Ranunculus spp.), and prickly wild Spaniards (Aciphylla spp.).

The mountain contains the only known habitat of a small sub-alpine shrub, the Hikurangi tutu (Coriaria pottsiana), found on the grassy scree slope behind the Mount Hikurangi Tramping Hut at 37°54′22″S 178°3′31″E.

Mount Hikurangi was the location of the last known mainland sighting of the North Island saddleback in 1910, before its reintroduction to the North Island on the 16th of June 2002 at Zealandia in Wellington. In Māori times, kaka would fatten themselves on the berries of the tawari trees growing on the mountain. In the 1960s, members of the Gisborne Tramping Club heard what they thought may have been the call of a kākāpō on the mountain, a parrot whose last documented existence in the North Island was in 1895.

The nearby Raukūmara Forest Park's forests include a wide range of podocarp-broadleaved species such as rimu, rātā, tawa, hinau, rewarewa, kāmahi, kahikatea, miro, beech and tōtara. Native birds and animals found in the area include pīwakawaka, tūī, whio, kākā, falcons, kererū, brown kiwi, Hochstetter's frogs, snails, lizards, skinks, Motuweta riparia (Raukumara tusked wētā), and short- and long-tailed bats. Introduced animals include deer, goats, possums, pigs, cattle and mustelidae, all of which pose a threat to the native wildlife.

== Recreation ==
Mount Hikurangi is about 130 km (81 mi) north of Gisborne by road. Visitors to the mountain are asked to contact Te Rūnanga o Ngāti Porou before arriving, as the track crosses their private land, which is sometimes closed for short periods for cultural or farming reasons. While there is no public vehicle or bicycle access beyond the car park near the bottom, 4x4 tours to the carvings can be organised through Te Rūnanga o Ngāti Porou, who also offer a summit guide and an overnight guide. From the car park, it is about a 7-hour walk to the summit. There is a hut for public use 4–5 hours up the mountain, but visitors must bring their own cooker and water. Bookings for the hut are also made through Te Rūnanga o Ngāti Porou. Visitors are advised to be cautious of the mountain's unpredictable weather, and to bring clothing suitable for all weather conditions.

Hunting of introduced species is permitted in the nearby Raukūmara Forest Park.

== See also ==
- List of mountains of New Zealand by height
- Waiapu Valley
- Ngāti Porou
