= Poroporo River =

- Route of the Poroporo River
- Mouth of the Poroporo River Poroporo River (North Island)

Location
- Country: New Zealand
- Island: North Island
- Region: Gisborne

Physical characteristics
- Source: Confluence of Ōruapūkaikena Creek and an unnamed stream
  - location: Ruatoria Forest
  - coordinates: 37.77711°S 178.26144°E
  - elevation: 400 m (1,300 ft)
- Mouth: Waiapu River
  - coordinates: 37°47′16″S 178°26′18″E
- Length: 18 km (11 mi)

Basin features
- Progression: Poroporo River → Waiapu River → Pacific Ocean
- Tributaries
  - left: Ngārarahiwihiwi Stream, Mangamahe Stream, Mangaone Stream
  - right: Mangarara Stream, Tukioteao Stream, Puhapata Stream
- Bridges: Poroporo River Bridge (Bridge 1800)

The Poroporo River is a river of the Gisborne District of New Zealand's North Island. It flows east from its sources in the eastern foothills of the Raukumara Range, reaching the Waiapu River close to its mouth, having shared the Waiapu's bed since the town of Tikitiki.

== See also ==
- List of rivers of New Zealand
