= Mount Arowhana =

Mountain in the northeast of New Zealand's North Island

- Arowhana

Highest point
- Elevation: 1,439 m (4,721 ft)
- Coordinates: 38.109°S 177.863°E

Geography
- Location: North Island, New Zealand
- Parent range: Raukūmara Range

Mount Arowhana is a 1,440 m (4,720 ft) mountain that is part of the backbone of the Raukumara Range in the northeast of New Zealand's North Island. The range forms part of a line of mountains extending along the eastern side of the North Island between the Gisborne District and Wellington.

The mountain is at the centre of a major watershed, on the boundary between the Gisborne District and the Ōpōtiki District. Its eastern side is drained by the Mata River, which flows to the Waiapu River, thence into the Pacific Ocean just south of East Cape. Its western side is drained by a tributary of the Mōtū River, which flows into the western Bay of Plenty.

Road access to the vicinity is via Whatatutu, a small settlement 30 kilometres to the south in a direct line.
