= Waiorongomai River =

Waiorongomai River is the name of two rivers in the North Island of New Zealand.

- Waiorongomai River (Gisborne)
- Waiorongomai River (Wellington)
