= Waitahaia River =

- Route of the Waitahaia River
- Mouth of the Waitahaia River Waitahaia River (North Island)

Location
- Country: New Zealand
- Island: North Island
- Region: Gisborne

Physical characteristics
- Source: Ruatahunga Stream
  - coordinates: 37.8821°S 177.995°E
- Mouth: Mata River
  - coordinates: 37°53′09″S 178°16′50″E
- Length: 21 km (13 mi)

Basin features
- Progression: Tapuaeroa River → Mata River → Waiapu River → Pacific Ocean
- Tributaries
  - left: Hikutāmomimomi Stream, Waingata Stream, Mangaropo Stream, Parewhawha Stream

The Waitahaia River is a river in the Waiapu Valley of the Gisborne District of New Zealand's North Island. It flows northeast from Ruatahunga Stream, which originates at the southern end of the Raukūmara Range, to reach the Mata River 20 kilometres (12 mi) west of Te Puia Springs. Brown trout, a European species of fish, was introduced into New Zealand for fishing in the late 1860s.

== See also ==
- List of rivers of New Zealand
