= Karakia =

Māori incantations and prayers

Karakia performed at the beginning of the construction of the Pike29 Memorial Track

Karakia are Māori incantations and prayer used to invoke spiritual guidance and protection. They are also considered a formal greeting when beginning a ceremony.

According to Māori legend, there was a curse on the Waiapu River which was lifted when George Gage (Hori Keeti) performed karakia. In Māori religion, karakia are used to ritually cleanse the homes of the deceased after a burial.

The missionary Richard Taylor gives a 19th-century view of the traditional role and scope of karakia:

The word karakia, which we use for prayer, formerly meant a spell, charm, or incantation [...] [Maori] have spells suited for all circumstances – to conquer enemies, catch fish, trap rats, and snare birds, to make their kumara grow, and even to bind the obstinate will of woman; to find anything lost; to discover a stray dog; a concealed enemy; in fact, for all their wants. These karakias are extremely numerous [...]

With the nineteenth-century introduction of Christianity to New Zealand, Māori adopted (or wrote new) karakia to acknowledge the new faith. Modern karakia tend to contain a blend of Christian and traditional influence, and their poetic language may make literal translations into English not always possible. In modern Māori society, performances of karakia frequently open important meetings and ceremonies, both within a Māori context (such as tribal hui, tangi, or the inauguration of new marae), and in a wider New Zealand setting in which both Māori and Pākehā participate (such as the beginning of public meetings or at the departure of official delegations for overseas).

Its use in local government meetings became contentious in the early 2020s.

== See also ==
- Karanga (Māori culture)
