= Mount Raukūmara =

Mountain in New Zealand

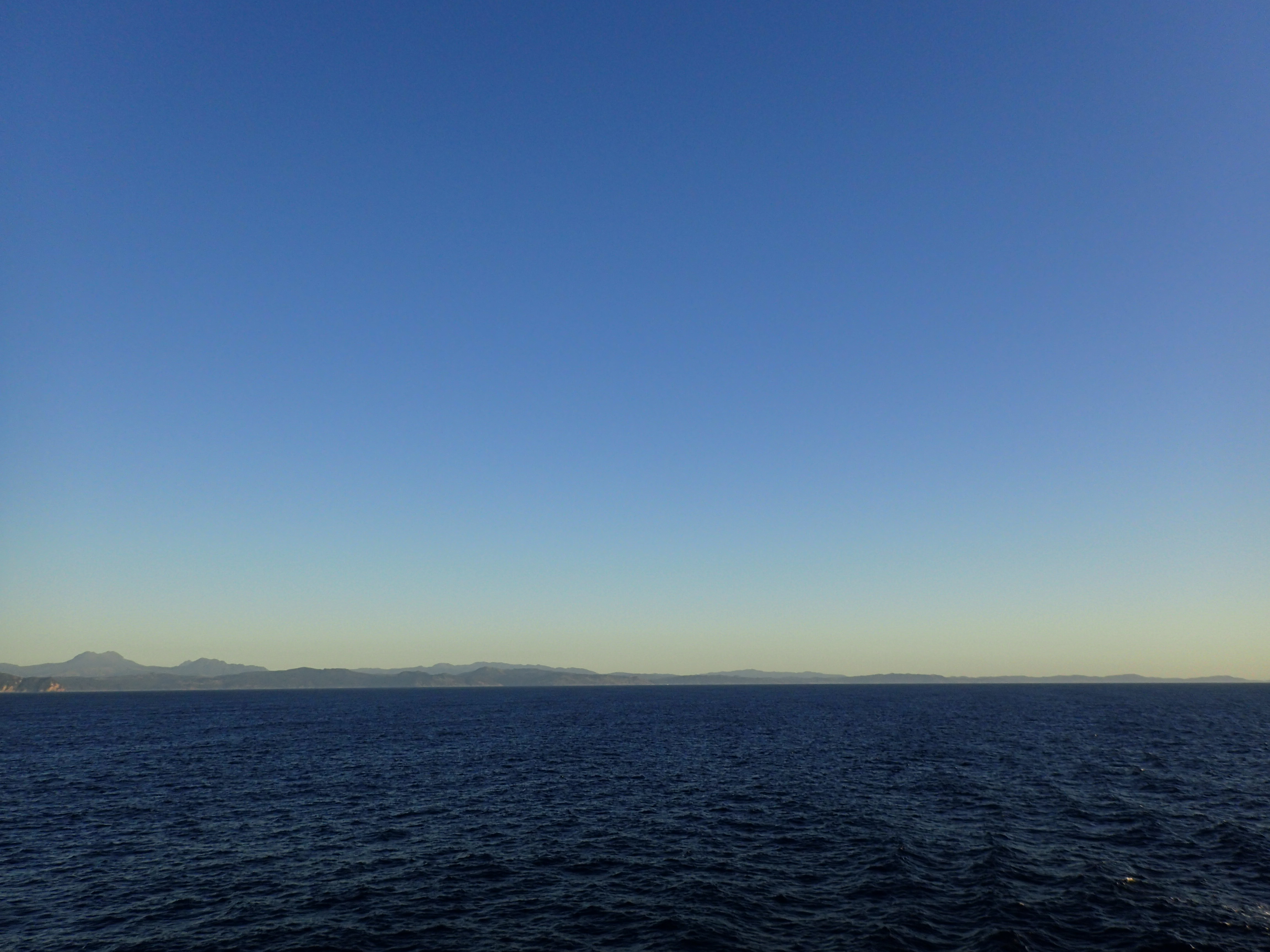
- Raukūmara Range with Hikurangi high on the left, Mt Raukūmara the high land towards the middle and East Cape on the right

Highest point
- Elevation: 1,413 m (4,636 ft)
- Prominence: 695.8 m (2,283 ft)
- Listing: List of mountains of New Zealand by height
- Coordinates: 37°45′53″S 178°07′33″E

Geography
- Location within North Island
- Location: Gisborne District, New Zealand
- Parent range: Raukūmara Range

Mount Raukūmara is a 1,413 m (4,636 ft) mountain that is the northernmost major peak in the Raukūmara Range in the northeast of New Zealand's North Island. It is part of the backbone of the range, which forms part of a line of mountains extending along the eastern side of the North Island between the Gisborne District and Wellington.

Mount Raukūmara is clearly visible from a great distance at sea, being located only 25 kilometres from both Cape Runaway and East Cape. Several rivers have their sources on the slopes of Raukūmara, among them tributaries of the Raukokore and Tapuaeroa Rivers.
