= Mata River =

- Route of the Mata River
- Mouth of the Mata River Mata River (North Island)

Location
- Country: New Zealand
- Island: North Island
- Region: Gisborne

Physical characteristics
- Source
  - location: Southeast side of Raukūmara Range, Gisborne District
  - coordinates: 38.07468°S 177.89007°E
  - elevation: 1,250 m (4,100 ft)
- Mouth: Waiapu River
  - location: Confluence with Tapuaeroa River
  - coordinates: 37°53′17″S 178°16′44″E
  - elevation: 58 m (190 ft)

Basin features
- Progression: Mata River → Waiapu River → Pacific Ocean
- Tributaries
  - left: Mangataika Stream, Puniatara Stream, Whakoau Stream, Owetea Stream, Waimatā Stream, Kaikomako Stream, Waitahaia River, Mangaoahiroa Stream, Te Roto Stream, Waingakia Stream, Mangapekapeka Stream, Aorangiwai River, Mangaohewa Stream, Taikatiki Stream
  - right: Junction Stream, Mangamātukutuku Stream, Mangamāunu Stream, Mangatarata Stream, Ruakākā Stream, Whareone Stream, Tarakihi Stream, Te Pora Stream, Mangahoui Stream, Mākara Stream, Mangaehu Stream, Rānui Stream, Ihungia River, Mākarika Stream, Makatote Stream

The Mata River is a river of the East Coast of the North Island of New Zealand. It flows northeast from the slopes of Mount Arowhana in the Raukumara Range to join with the Tapuaeroa River close to the settlement of Ruatoria, in doing so forming the Waiapu River, which reaches the Pacific Ocean near Rangitukia, 10 kilometres (6 mi) south of East Cape.
