= Matakaoa Ward =

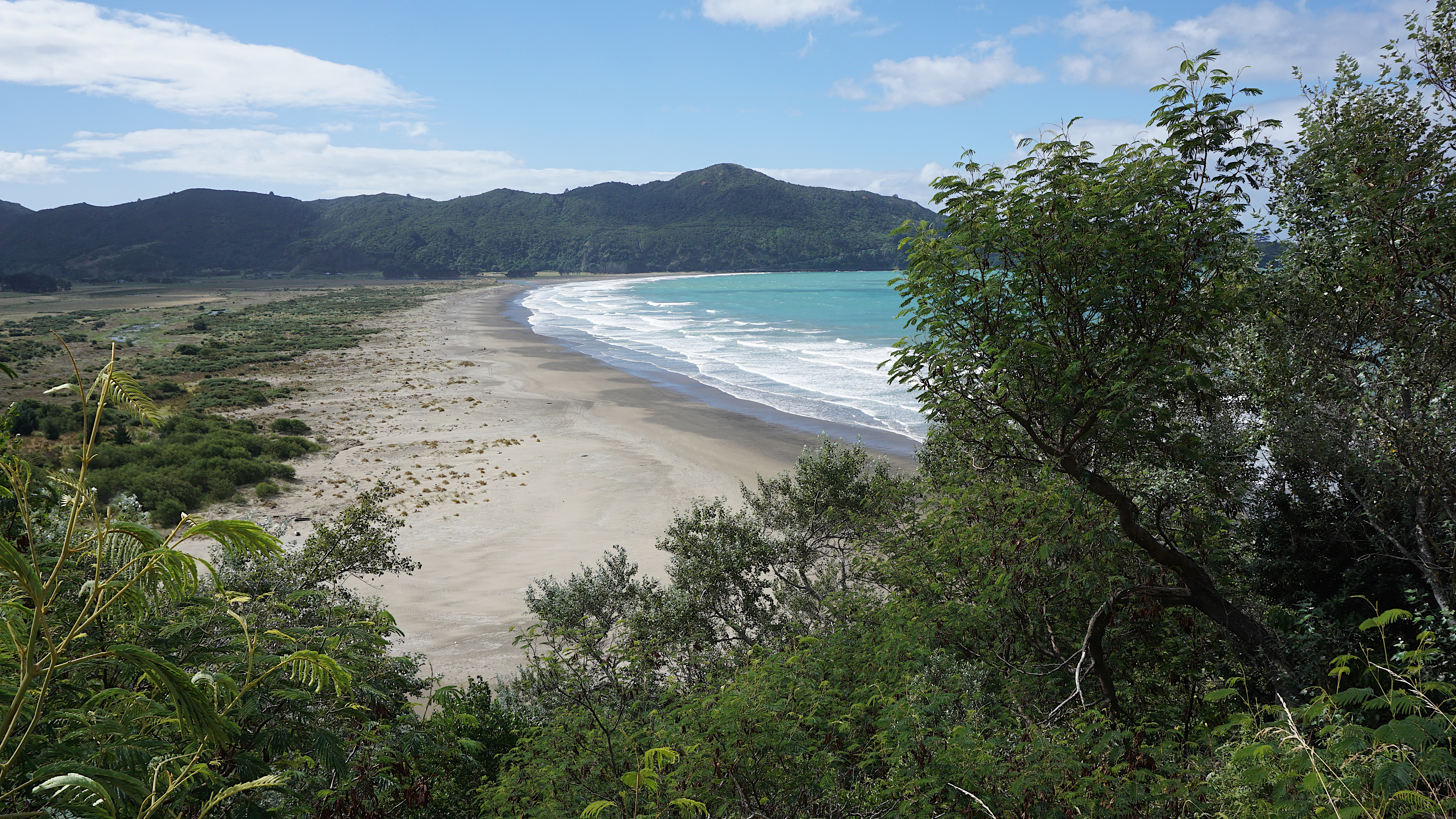
Hicks Bay

Matakaoa Ward was the most northern and eastern ward in the Gisborne District, on the east coast of the North Island of New Zealand. In 2012 it was decided to split the neighbouring Waiapu Ward for the 2013 election, with the northern part being combined with Matakaoa Ward to form Matakaoa-Waiapu Ward. Matakaoa Ward contained the towns of Tikitiki, Te Araroa, and Hicks Bay. It also contained the East Cape Lighthouse, the most easterly place in mainland New Zealand.
