= Maungahaumi =

Mountain in the northeast of New Zealand's North Island

- Mangahaumia

Highest point
- Elevation: 1,213 m (3,980 ft)
- Coordinates: 38.3°S 177.664°E

Geography
- Location: North Island, New Zealand
- Parent range: Raukūmara Range

Maungahaumi is a mountain in the Raukumara Range in the northeast of New Zealand's North Island.

Part of the backbone of the range, which forms part of a line of mountains extending across much of the North Island, 1,213 m (3,980 ft) Maungahaumi is the southernmost of the Raukumara Range's most prominent peaks. To the southwest of the peak is a saddle separating the Raukumara Range from the Huiarau Range – this saddle, with its highest point at the 725 m (2,379 ft) Traffords Hill, is crossed by State Highway 2, the main road link between Gisborne and Ōpōtiki in the Bay of Plenty.

Several tributaries of the Waipaoa River have their sources on the slopes of Maungahaumi.

== Cultural significance ==
Maungahaumi is the principal ancestral mountain of the Maori tribe Ngaariki Kaiputahi, as well as other affiliated tribal groups and hapū in the Tūranga region.

=== Name ===
The origins of the name date back to the story of the Horouta waka and its journey from Hawaiki. The Horouta waka (led by captain Paoa) became severely damaged by high winds and seas en route to New Zealand. The waka and the crew on board were subsequently washed ashore at Ohiwa near Ōpōtiki with a broken hull and bow piece. Upon landing, Paoa and his crew ventured inland to the interior mountain ranges to find suitable materials to repair the vessel. It was on the mountain that we now know as Maungahaumi, where he found the totara trees that were used to repair and bring together the hull and bow pieces of the waka.

From this experience, Paoa named the mountain from the Maori words maunga (mountain) and haumi (to join together), as a testament to the resources the mountain provided towards repairing the waka. The tale is also told in the old pātere (chant) "Haramai a Paoa".
