= Mangahanea Marae =

- Marae
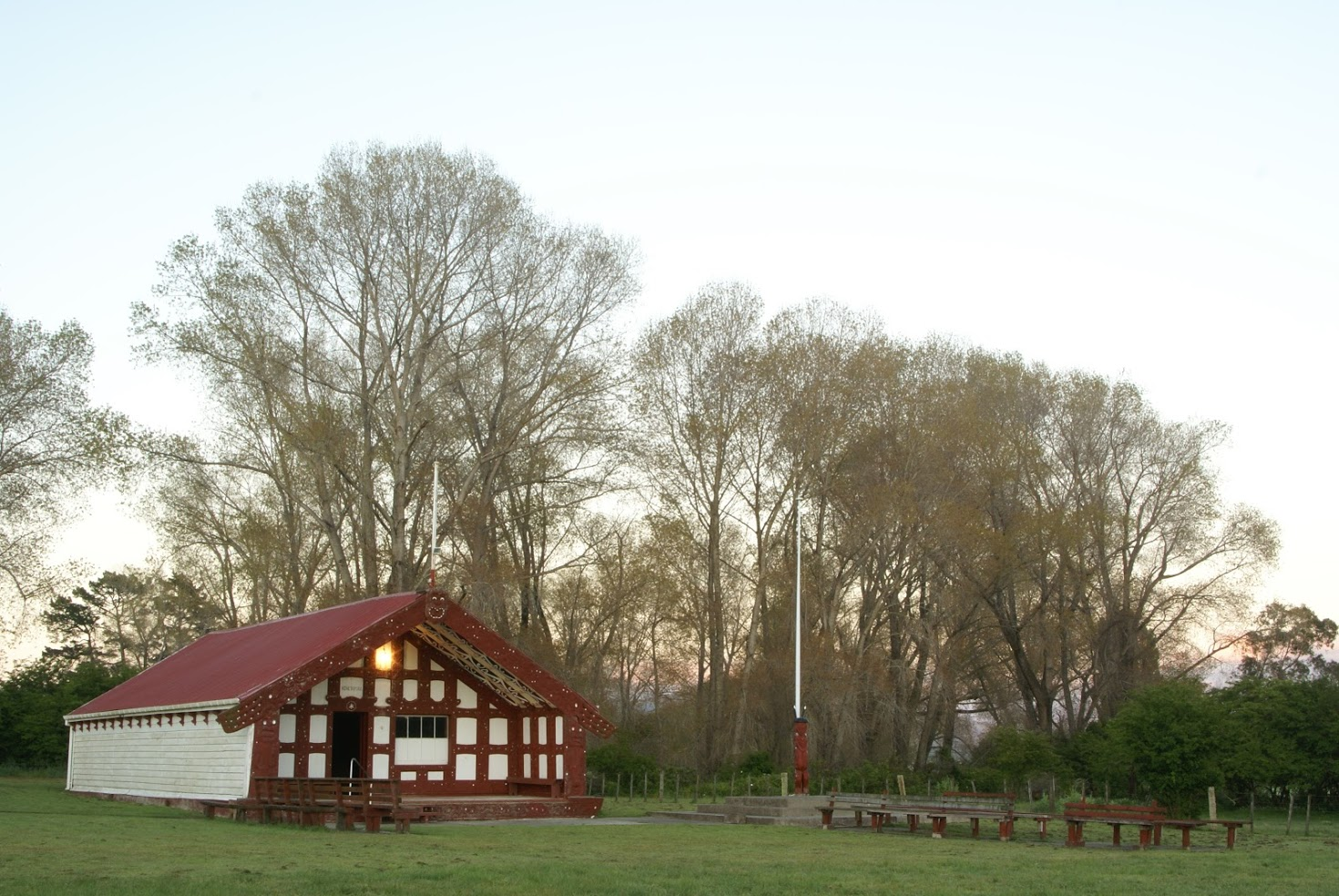
- The meeting house, Hinetapora, at Mangahanea Marae
- Coordinates: 37°53′17″S 178°20′39″E
- Location: Tuparoa Rd, Ruatoria
- Iwi: Ngāti Porou; Ngāti Uepohatu
- Wharenui: Hinetapora (opened 1896)
- Wharekai: Tawhiorangi (opened 1938)
- Whare karakia: Reneti
- Website: www.mangahanea.org

Mangahanea Marae is a marae (traditional Māori tribal gathering place) located in the East Coast township of Ruatoria in New Zealand. The marae is the within the land catchment of the descendants of Māori tribes Ngāti Porou and Ngāti Uepohatu, through the marriage of Hinetapora and Te Rangikaputua. Their descendants are connected to a number of subtribes (hapū): Uepohatu, Te Aitangā o Materoa, Hauiti, Ruataupare and Te Whānau o Umuariki.

The marae's whare tīpuna, the main ancestral house, is called "Hinetapora". Work started on its carvings and interior panels during the 1880s and the house was formally opened in 1896. The carvers of Hinetapora included Hone Tahu, Wi Tahata and Hoani Ngatoto. The house includes paintings that can be described as Māori folk art, including the stylised depiction of a Māori war canoe being paddled by "rather innocent looking" young men.

Opening ceremony for the dining hall on 11 June 1938. Apirana Ngata is speaking on the marae ātea in front of the wharenui.

The dining hall (wharekai), decorated with tukutuku panels and carvings, is named Rutu Tawhiorangi, and was officially opened on 11 June 1938. Dignitaries at the hall's opening included the acting Minister of Native Affairs, Frank Langstone, and the Māori king, Korokī. The opening ceremony had been delayed from April as a result of flooding on Anzac Day. The carvings for the dining hall were executed by Hōne Taiapa and a team of five or six carvers from the School of Maori Arts.

Like many marae on the East Coast, the complex at Mangahanea Marae includes an Anglican Church; at Mangahanea the church is named "Reneti", which translates into English as 'Lent'. The church was burned in December 1986, during a spate of arson attacks in the Ruatoria area; the governor-general, Sir Paul Reeves, visited Mangahanea Marae on 14 December 1986 to support the people of Ruatoria after some of the arsons.

The land under the marae was made a Māori Reserve under the Native Purposes Act 1937 (later renamed the Maori Purposes Act 1937) on 29 October 1947.

The marae was the site of an iconic Herbs album launch party in 1987.

In October 2020, the Government committed $5,756,639 from the Provincial Growth Fund to upgrade the marae and 28 other Ngāti Porou marae. The funding was expected to create 205 jobs.
