= Takaputahi River =

- Route of the Takaputahi River
- Mouth of the Takaputahi River Takaputahi River (North Island)

Location
- Country: New Zealand

Physical characteristics
- Source
  - location: Confluence of the Ngaupokotangata Stream and Whitikau Stream
  - coordinates: 38°07′03″S 177°35′25″E
- Mouth
  - location: Mōtū River
  - coordinates: 38°03′55″S 177°41′31″E
- Length: 22 km (14 mi)

Basin features
- Progression: Takaputahi River → Mōtū River → Bay of Plenty → Pacific Ocean
- Tributaries
  - left: Mangaonuku Stream, Rawea Stream

The Takaputahi River is a river of the Bay of Plenty Region of New Zealand's North Island. It has its origins in numerous streams which rise in rough hill country close to the eastern end of the Bay of Plenty, the longest of which is the Rawea Stream. The Takaputahi flows generally east, away from the Bay of Plenty coast, before meeting the Mōtū River. Much of the river's length is within the Raukumara Forest Park.

== See also ==
- List of rivers of New Zealand
