= Waiapu Ward =

Waiapu Ward was a ward in the Gisborne District on the east coast of the North Island of New Zealand. In 2012 it was decided to disestablish the ward for the 2013 election, with the northern part being combined with Matakaoa Ward to form Matakaoa-Waiapu Ward, and the southern part being combined with Uawa Ward to form Tawhiti-Uawa Ward.

Waiapu Ward contained the towns of Ruatoria, Te Puia Springs, and Tokomaru Bay. The majority of the ward lay within the Waiapu Valley.
