= Tapuaeroa River =

- Route of the Tapuaeroa River
- Mouth of the Tapuaeroa River Tapuaeroa River (North Island)

Location
- Country: New Zealand
- Island: North Island
- Region: Gisborne

Physical characteristics
- Source: Confluence of the Oronui Stream and Mangamauku Stream
  - coordinates: 37.8821°S 177.995°E
- Mouth: Waiapu River
  - coordinates: 37°53′09″S 178°16′50″E
- Length: 24 km (15 mi)

Basin features
- Progression: Tapuaeroa River → Waiapu River → Pacific Ocean
- Tributaries
  - left: Huitatariki Stream, Mangaraukokore Stream, Raparapaririki Stream, Mangapoi Stream, Mangawhairiki Stream, Mangahoanga Stream, Mangatītī Stream, Waiorongomai River, Mangapapa Stream, Mangarara Stream, Mangarua Stream
  - right: Mangarata Stream, Mangarara Stream, Mangakōtukutuku Stream, Mokoiwi Stream, Te Rerekokako Stream, Mangapekepeke Stream
- Bridges: Pakihiroa Road Bridge

The Tapuaeroa River is a river of the Gisborne Region of New Zealand's North Island. It flows southeast from its sources in the Raukumara Range from the confluence of the Oronui Stream and Mangamauku Stream, joining its waters with those of the Mata River close to the town of Ruatoria, the resulting flow becoming the Waiapu River.

== See also ==
- List of rivers of New Zealand
