= Mōtū River =

River in New Zealand

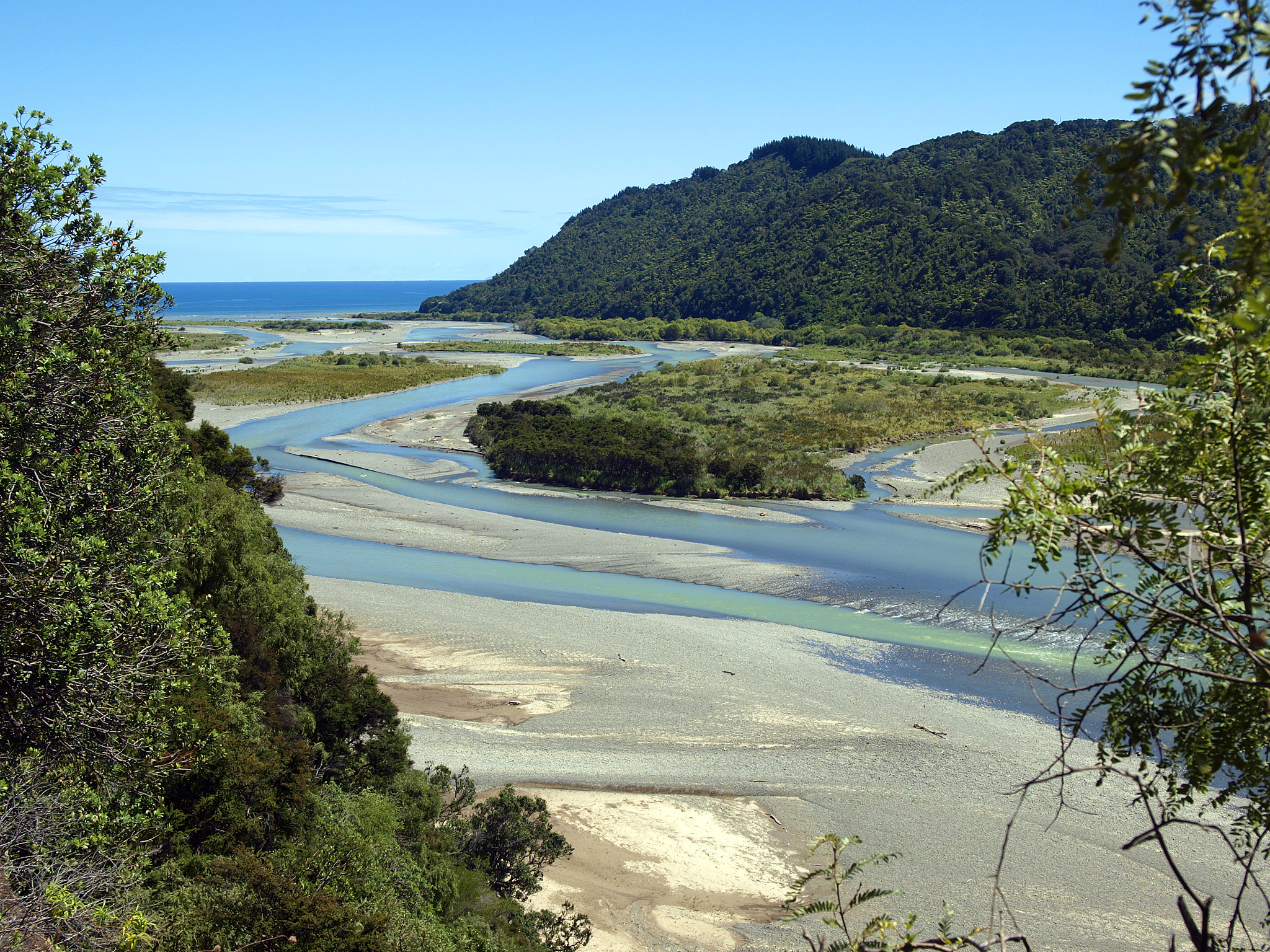
- Mōtū River mouth
- Route of the Mōtū River
- Mouth of the Mōtū River Mōtū River (North Island)
- Native name: Mōtū (Māori)

Location
- Country: New Zealand

Physical characteristics
- Source: South-west of Mātāwai
  - location: Gisborne District
  - coordinates: 38°24′49″S 177°30′45″E
- Mouth
  - location: Bay of Plenty
  - coordinates: 37°51′21″S 177°35′26″E

Basin features
- Progression: Mōtū River → Bay of Plenty → Pacific Ocean
- Tributaries
  - left: Whakapaupakihi Stream, Takaputahi River, Tawharenga Stream, Mangakirikiri Stream, Waireae Stream, Te Urutu Stream, Perehia Stream, Manuriki Stream, Tauwhare Stream, Tutu Stream, Omawaka Stream
  - right: Mātāwai Stream, Murray Stream, Waiwhero Stream, Gold Creek, Waitangirua Stream, Whakamaria Stream, Mangaotāne Stream, Maihewai Stream, Te Kahika Stream, Mangatutara Stream, Huaero Stream, Te Mangatu Stream, Te Makakaho Stream, Mangamouku Stream, Te Rimu Stream, Te Mangaroa Stream, Mangapiha Stream, Te Pohue Stream, Omatapo Stream
- Waterfalls: Mōtū Falls, Bullivants Cascade, The Slot, Sonny's Revenge, Boulder Rapid, The Shute, Double Staircase, Helicopter Rapid, Fan Rapid, White Rapid
- Bridges: Te Whitinga o Tamataipunoa (Motu Bridge), Motu River Bridge

The Mōtū River is a major waterway in the eastern part of the North Island of New Zealand. It rises south-west of Mātāwai in the Gisborne District, on the south-western side of the Raukūmara Range, and heads roughly northwards to the Pacific Ocean. It flows in a gorge the whole way through the range, where its important tributaries merge with it. It empties into the eastern Bay of Plenty at Houpoto, between Hāwai and Ōmāio, 31 km (19 mi) north-east of Ōpōtiki.

== Description ==
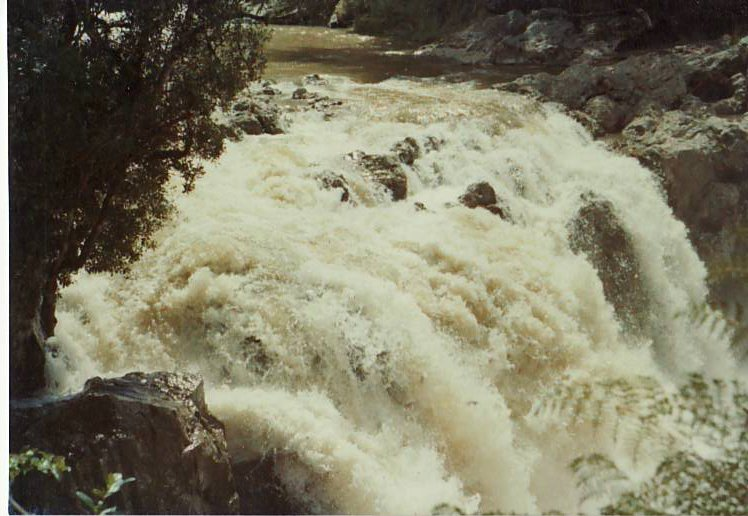
Mōtū Falls, downstream from Mōtū village

The river passes through mostly uninhabited hill country, very steep and still thickly covered in rainforest.

== History ==
The first modern traverse of the river, from the Mōtū Falls to its mouth, was in 1920 by the Fisher brothers and S. Thorburn, and this was re-enacted in 2013 by Kevin Biggar and Jamie Fitzgerald in series 2 of the "First Crossings" TV series. A mid-20th century proposal to dam the river for hydroelectricity was rejected.

== Recreation ==
It is much used for adventure tourism (jet-boating and white-water rafting).
