= Maraehara River =

- Route of the Maraehara River
- Mouth of the Maraehara River Maraehara River (North Island)

Location
- Country: New Zealand
- Island: North Island
- Region: Gisborne

Physical characteristics
- Source: Whakaangiangi
  - coordinates: 37°45′21″S 178°15′55″E
  - elevation: 380 m (1,250 ft)
- Mouth: Waiapu River
  - location: Rangitukia
  - coordinates: 37°46′25″S 178°28′17″E
  - elevation: 0 m (0 ft)

Basin features
- Progression: Maraehara River → Waiapu River → Pacific Ocean
- Tributaries
  - left: Waitaiko Stream, Tihi Stream, Ngārarapapa Stream, Mākawakawa Stream, Mangarangiora Stream, Kirikohe Stream, Houpatero Stream, Houpatete Stream
  - right: Mangawhero Stream, Haupōuri Stream, Mangaotawhito Stream, Kuramori Stream, Mangahoanga Stream
- Bridges: Maraehara River Bridge (1720)

The Maraehara River is a river of the Gisborne Region in New Zealand. Rising on the eastern slopes of Mount Whakatiki in the Ruatoria Forest, the river flows eastwards. It flows into the Pacific Ocean, sharing a coastal lagoon with the larger Waiapu River.

== See also ==
- List of rivers of New Zealand
