= Mundic =

Mundic was used from the 1690s to describe a copper ore that began to be smelted at Bristol and elsewhere in southwestern Britain. Smelting was carried out in cupolas, that is reverberatory furnaces using mineral coal. For more details, see copper extraction.

Mundic once only referred to pyrite, but its meaning has since broadened to include deterioration of concrete that is caused by oxidisation of pyrites within the aggregate (usually originating from mine waste). The action of water and oxygen on pyrite forms sulphate (a salt of sulphuric acid), thereby depleting the pyrite, causing loss of adhesion and physical expansion.

== Mundic block problem ==
The Cornish word mundic is now used to describe a cause of deterioration in concrete due to the decomposition of mineral constituents within the aggregate. A typical source of such aggregates is metalliferous mine waste. Royal Institution of Chartered Surveyors professional guidance describes all of Cornwall and an area within 15 km of Tavistock as being areas where routine testing for mundic is required. The notes go on to state that testing should be confined to buildings which contain concrete elements (blocks or in situ) and that were built in or prior to 1950. However, the notes contain advice that testing may be required where there are visual or other signs of mundic decay. Testing leads to a classification of A (subdivided into A_{1}, A_{2} and A_{3}), B or C. All A classifications are sound, B is sound but contains sufficient deleterious aggregate for it to be considered unstable and C is unsound. Classifications B & C mean that a property may be unmortgageable.

Typically a house is routinely screened if constructed between 1900 and 1960 from concrete block.
