= Tikitiki =

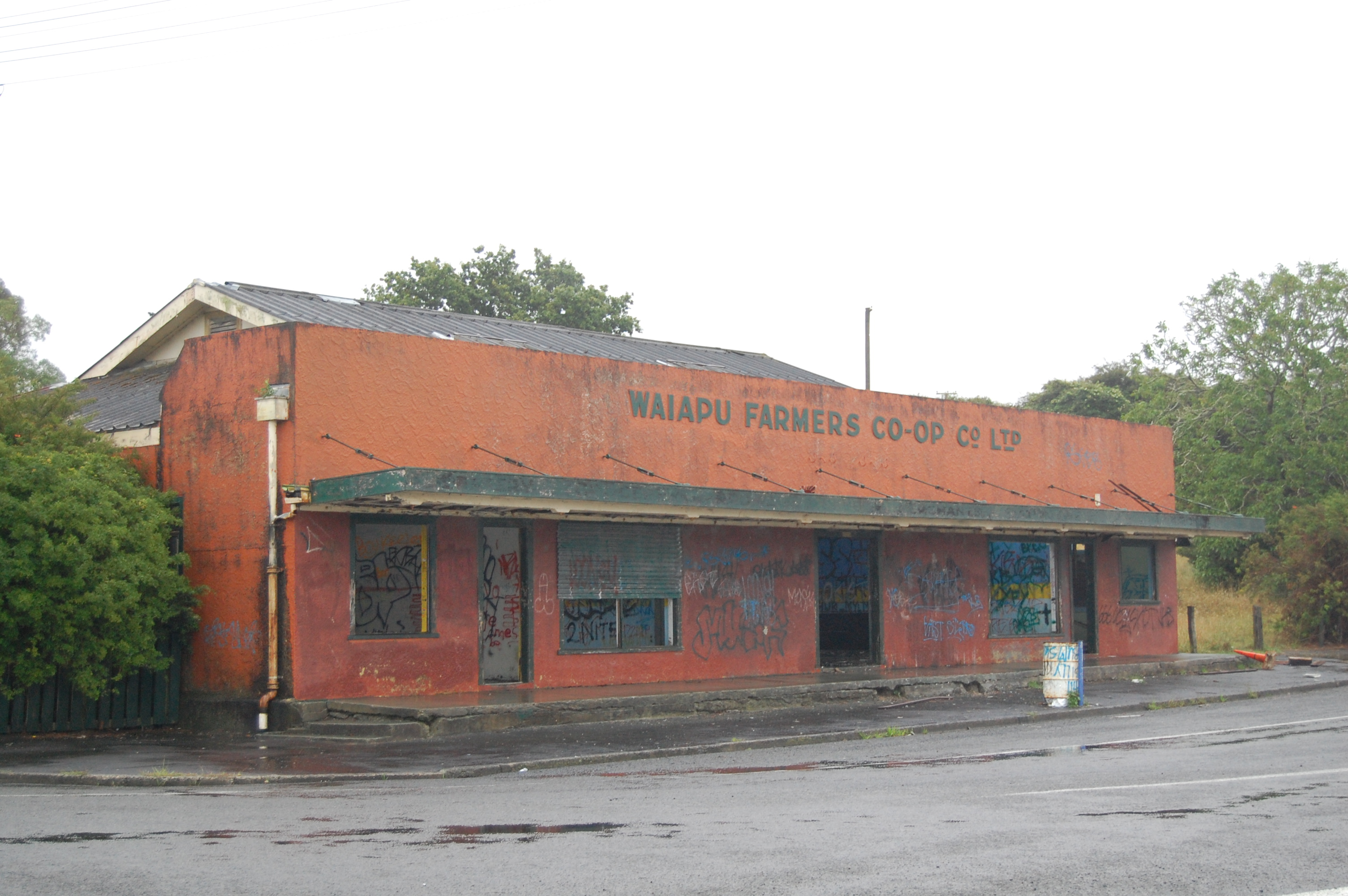
- Derelict building in Tikitiki
- Interactive map of Tikitiki
- Coordinates: 37°47′44″S 178°24′37″E
- Country: New Zealand
- Region: Gisborne District
- Ward: Tairāwhiti General Ward
- Electorates: East Cape; Ikaroa-Rāwhiti (Māori)

Government
  - Territorial authority: Gisborne District Council
  - Mayor of Gisborne: Rehette Stoltz
  - East Cape MP: Dana Kirkpatrick
  - Ikaroa-Rāwhiti MP: Cushla Tangaere-Manuel

Area
  - Total: 102.23 km^{2} (39.47 sq mi)

Population (2023 Census)
  - Total: 333
  - Density: 3.26/km^{2} (8.44/sq mi)
- Time zone: UTC+12 (NZST)
  - Summer (DST): UTC+13 (NZDT)
- Postcode: 4087
- Area code: 06

Tikitiki is a small town in Waiapu Valley on the north bank of the Waiapu River in the Gisborne Region of the North Island of New Zealand. The area in which the town resides was formerly known as Kahukura. By road, Tikitiki is 145 km (90 mi) north-northeast of Gisborne, 20 km (12 mi) northeast by north of Ruatoria, and 24 km (15 mi) south by east of Te Araroa. The name of the town comes from the full name of Māui, Māui-tikitiki-a-Taranga (Māui wrapped in the topknot of Taranga). State Highway 35 passes through the town at the easternmost point of the New Zealand state highway network.

The town is 6 km (3.7 mi) from the smaller town of Rangitukia, near the mouth of the Waiapu River. These towns historically had a racecourse, four rugby teams, and several shops fuelled by a thriving dairy industry. In the 1950s and 1960s the towns had a combined population of 6,000, but economic downturn in the area in the mid to late 1960s led to urban drift, and 2011 figures put the population of both towns at 528. Most people in these towns are either homemakers, or employed in the roading, forestry, farming, or food industries, or as office workers.

== Demographics ==
Tikitiki and its surrounds cover 102.23 km^{2} (39.47 sq mi). It is part of the East Cape statistical area.

Historical population
Year	Pop.	±% p.a.
2013	276	—
2018	294	+1.27%
2023	333	+2.52%

Tikitiki had a population of 333 in the 2023 New Zealand census, an increase of 39 people (13.3%) since the 2018 census, and an increase of 57 people (20.7%) since the 2013 census. There were 177 males and 156 females in 93 dwellings. 0.9% of people identified as LGBTIQ+. There were 84 people (25.2%) aged under 15 years, 60 (18.0%) aged 15 to 29, 138 (41.4%) aged 30 to 64, and 48 (14.4%) aged 65 or older.

People could identify as more than one ethnicity. The results were 18.9% European (Pākehā), 93.7% Māori, 2.7% Pasifika, and 0.9% Asian. English was spoken by 95.5%, Māori by 43.2%, and other languages by 1.8%. No language could be spoken by 1.8% (e.g. too young to talk). The percentage of people born overseas was 3.6, compared with 28.8% nationally.

Religious affiliations were 40.5% Christian, 2.7% Māori religious beliefs, 0.9% Buddhist, and 1.8% other religions. People who answered that they had no religion were 51.4%, and 5.4% of people did not answer the census question.

Of those at least 15 years old, 33 (13.3%) people had a bachelor's or higher degree, 129 (51.8%) had a post-high school certificate or diploma, and 90 (36.1%) people exclusively held high school qualifications. 6 people (2.4%) earned over $100,000 compared to 12.1% nationally. The employment status of those at least 15 was 96 (38.6%) full-time, 27 (10.8%) part-time, and 9 (3.6%) unemployed.

== Landmarks ==
According to Te Ara - the Encyclopedia of New Zealand "Tikitiki’s jewel" is St. Mary's church. It is non-denominational but has historic links to the Anglican Church and is therefore essentially Anglican. It was built from 1924 to 1926 under the guidance of Sir Āpirana Ngata to remember the Ngāti Porou soldiers who fought and died in World War I and to commemorate the establishment of Christianity in Waiapu Valley and the East Coast. The church, which integrates Māori architecture into its design, contains references to the fallen soldiers within its extensive carvings, tukutuku, and stained glass windows.

Above and behind the church is a hill containing the remains of a fortified pā called Pukemaire. The pā dates back to pre-European times, and by 1865 was occupied by followers of the syncretic Christian Māori religion, Pai Mārire. That year, as part of the New Zealand Wars, the pā was attacked by both colonial forces and Ngāti Porou forces loyal to the New Zealand Government (called kūpapa). This was one of the last confrontations between Pai Mārire and Ngāti Porou. While the majority of the area inside the pā's defensive perimeter has been ploughed many times, the eastern end behind St Mary's Church has been left intact, where the remains of kūmara storage pits can be seen.

=== Marae ===
The Tikitiki area has five marae belonging to Ngāti Porou hapū.

Kaiwaka Marae and Te Kapenga meeting house is a meeting place of Ngāti Putaanga and Te Whānau a Hinerupe. In October 2020, the Government committed $5,756,639 from the Provincial Growth Fund to upgrade the marae and 28 others in the Gisborne District; the funding was expected to create 205 jobs.

Rahui Marae and Rongomaianiwaniwa meeting house is a meeting place of Te Whānau a Hinerupe and Te Whānau a Rākaimataura. Tinātoka Marae and Te Poho o Tinatoka meeting house is a meeting place of Te Whānau a Te Uruahi and Te Whanau a Tinatoka. In October 2020, the Government committed $1,686,254 from the Provincial Growth Fund to upgrade Rahui Marae, Tinātoka Marae and 4 other Rongowhakaata marae, creating an estimated 41 jobs.

Putaanga Marae and meeting house is a meeting place of Ngāti Putaanga.

Taumata o Tapuhi Marae and Te Ao Kairau meeting house, a meeting place of Te Whānau a Tapuhi.

The Rangitukia area also has three marae.

== Education ==
Tikitiki has a co-educational full primary school called Tikitiki School or Pae-O-Te-Riri School with a roll of 29 students as of July 2026. The name Pae-O-Te-Riri means "Resting place of a war party on the march".

The school was opened in 1887 as a Māori school, and originally had approximately 300 students.
