= Waiapu River =

River in New Zealand

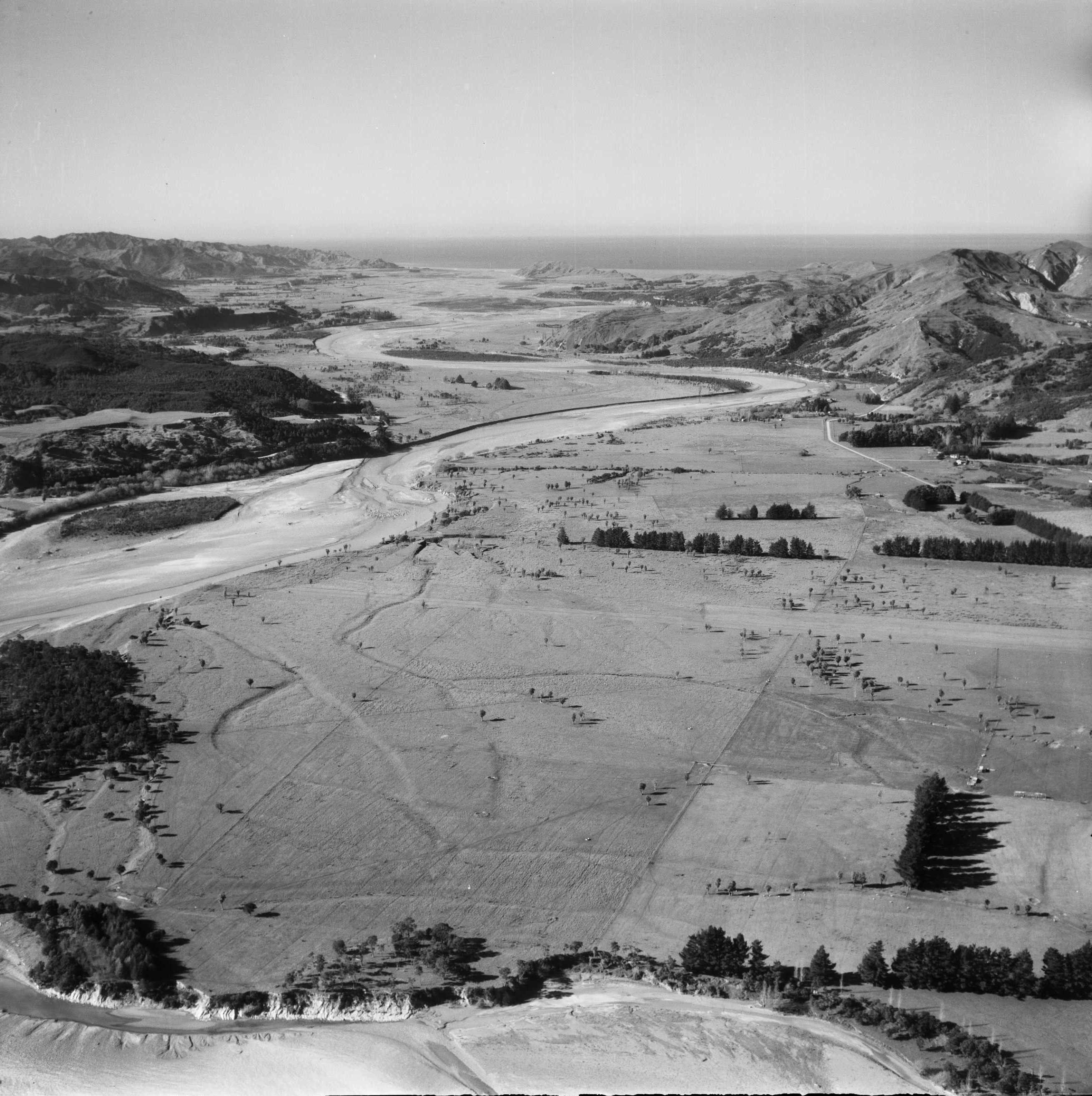
- Aerial view of the Waiapu River and Ruatoria in 1958
- Route of the Waiapu River
- Mouth of the Waiapu River Waiapu River (North Island)

Location
- Country: New Zealand
- Island: North Island
- District: Gisborne
- Ward: Waiapu Ward

Physical characteristics
- Source: Confluence of the Tapuaeroa River and Mata River
  - location: Raukūmara Range
  - coordinates: 37.88813°S 178.28107°E
- Mouth: Pacific Ocean
  - coordinates: 37°46′39″S 178°29′09″E
- Length: 130 km (81 mi)

Basin features
- Progression: Waiapu River → Pacific Ocean
- Tributaries
  - left: Whakatū Stream, Mangakōpikopiko Stream, Mangaoparo River, Paoaruku Stream, Mangaiwi Stream, Mangarara Stream, Pukerimu Stream, Karata Stream, Makoao Stream, Poroporo River, Motumako Stream, Maraehara River
  - right: Mangakinonui Stream, Mangahārei Stream, Kōpuaroa Stream, Mangaonui Stream, Mangatakawa Stream, Wairoa River, Mākirikiri Stream, Mangawhero Stream

The Waiapu River is a river in the Gisborne District of the North Island of New Zealand, with a total length of approximately 130 kilometres (81 mi). Found in the north-east of the Waiapu Valley, it flows north-east from the joining of the Mata River and the Tapuaeroa River (both of which flow from the Raukumara Ranges), then passes by Ruatoria before reaching the Pacific Ocean at Rangitukia. Other tributaries of the Waiapu River include the Mangaoporo, Poroporo, Wairoa, Maraehara rivers, and the Paoaruku stream. It is the most well-known river in the region and lies within the rohe (territory) of Ngāti Porou, the largest iwi (extended kinship group or tribe) on the East Coast, and second largest in New Zealand. The area was the site of hostilities during the New Zealand Wars from June to October in 1865, both between Pākehā (New Zealand Europeans) and Māori, and between factions of Ngāti Porou.

The New Zealand Ministry for Culture and Heritage gives a translation of "swallowing river" for Waiapu.

== Environmental issues ==
In 1840, approximately 80% of the Waiapu River catchment area, covering 1,734 square kilometres (670 sq mi), was native forest, with a rich array of native flora and fauna. There was a small area to the east of the river covered in coastal forest and scrub due to partial clearance and burning. Between 1890 and 1930 there was large-scale clearing, felling and burning of native forests for pastoralism. Floods and heavy rainfall are common to the area, and this, combined with the development, resulted in widespread erosion and large amounts of sediment being deposited in the river. This has changed the landscape significantly.

Since the late 1960s, much work has been done to repair the area by planting exotic forests in eroding areas, and encouraging the return of native scrub. However, by 2002 the Waiapu catchment area had few natural habitats remaining. It was 26% exotic Pinus radiata forest, 37% pasture, 21% native forest, and about 12% kānuka and mānuka scrub. It was highly degraded and modified, and had extensive and serious erosion problems. About half of the pasture area could be considered erosion-prone and unsustainable. Many of the catchment's rivers were full of sediment, and classed as highly degraded. The river had one of the highest sediment yields in the world (20,520 t/km^{2}/year in 2000), more than two and a half times that of the adjacent catchment area of the Waipaoa River. Anecdotal evidence suggests that this sediment may have adversely affected nearby coastal and marine environments.

Approximately one sixth of the annual sediment flow in all New Zealand river systems is in the Waiapu River, which continues to be one of the most sediment laden rivers in the world. The annual suspended sediment load is 36 million tonnes, and 90.47 cubic metres (3,195 cu ft) of sediment flows into the sea every second. The water quality of the river's tributaries is often much higher, as they are closer to the native vegetation cover of the Raukumara Ranges.

In lower areas, much of the eroded gravel from the catchment area settles on the Waiapu riverbed, making it rise rapidly. The riverbed rose 1 metre (3.3 ft) between 1986 and 2007, and a number of bridges over Waiapu's tributaries have had to be raised to accommodate their rising riverbeds. As the riverbed rises, so does the river, which is causing extensive riverbank erosion. The banks eroded at a rate of 8 metres (26 ft) per year between 1988 and 1997. By the 2003 to 2008 period this rate had doubled, with 22 metres (72 ft) per year eroding in 2005 and 2006. This erosion threatens the town of Ruatoria, and groynes have been installed in an attempt to divert the river away from the town.

== Māori history and significance ==
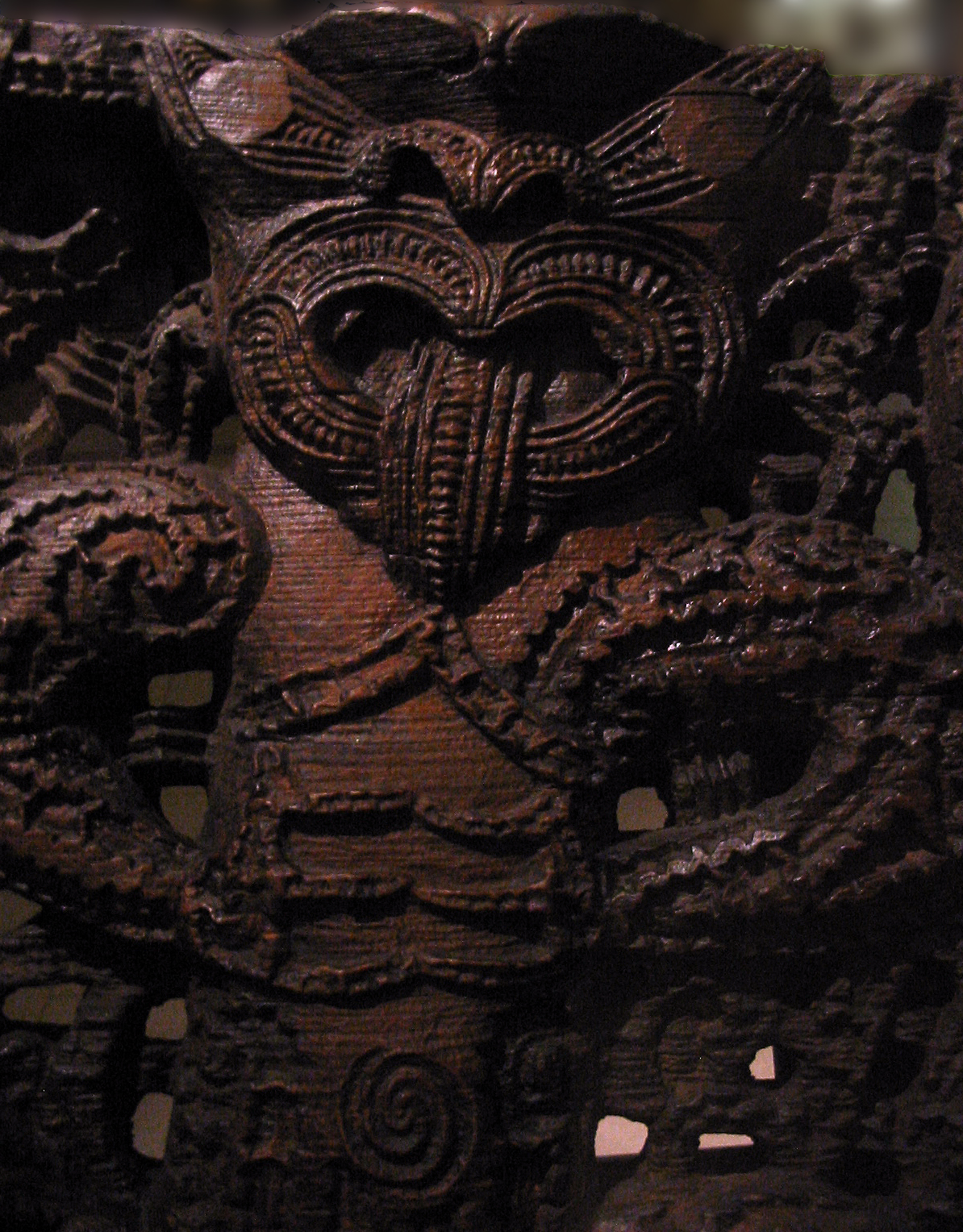
Paepae pātaka (threshold of a storehouse) in the Waiapu Valley

Māori settlement of the Waiapu Valley, surrounding the Waiapu River, was widespread until the 1880s. The river and valley are within the rohe (territory) of Ngāti Porou, and are of immense cultural, spiritual, economic, and traditional value to them. According to traditional beliefs, Ngāti Porou have had an undisturbed relationship with the river since the time of Māui, and the river serves to unite those who live on either side of it. The valley, which they call Te Riu o Waiapu, was a place where they could live, offering safe refuge during periods of war, and supplies of fresh water and various species of fish. In 1840, Ngāti Porou extensively cultivated the area around the river. The significance of the river is expressed in the following whakataukī or pepeha (sayings or proverbs):

Ko Hikurangi te maunga, Ko Waiapu te awa, Ko Ngāti Porou te iwi (Hikurangi the mountain, Waiapu the river, Ngati Porou the people)

Hoake tāua ki Waiapu ki tātara e maru ana. (Let us shelter under the thick matted cloak of Waiapu.)

The first Māori church was built on the banks of the Waiapu river in the 1830s. Whakawhitirā Pā, in which the church was located, was described to Richard Taylor as the largest in the region. Just prior to 1840, the pā had approximately 3,000 inhabitants. Taylor's drawing of the church, done after visiting in April 1839, can be viewed here.

Many Ngāti Porou hapū (subtribes or clans) still live in the area, and the valley has a large number of marae. In 2002, the population was approximately 90% Māori, and traditional culture is still practised in the area — though it has changed significantly in the last 150 years. Since they arrived, the many hapū that live alongside the Waiapu River have been responsible for preserving the mauri (special nature) of the river, and the hapū of the valley act as kaitiakitanga (guardians) of the river and its tributaries. The techniques the iwi use to catch kahawai at the mouth of the river are unique to that river, and are considered sacred.

Ngāti Porou believe that taniwha (water spirits or monsters) dwell in and protect the river, in turn protecting the valley and its hapū. Taniwha believed to be in Waiapu River include Kotuwainuku, Kotuwairangi, Ohinewaiapu, and Ngungurutehorowhatu.

According to an affidavit of Hapukuniha Te Huakore Karaka, two taniwha were placed in strategic locations in the river to protect the hapū from invading tribes — one near Paoaruku (a locality at 37°49′38″S 178°20′21″E) and one at the Wairoa River (a small creek at 37°50′13″S 178°24′00″E). Karaka said that a bridge was built from Tikitiki to Waiomatatini, to the protest of local Māori who were concerned that it would disturb the taniwha. The night before the bridge was completed, a storm came washing the bridge away — the weather till then had been calm. From then, one person would drown in the river nearly every year. If it did not happen one year, two would drown the next. A local tohunga, George Gage (Hori Te Kou-o-rehua Keeti) was approached to help the situation, and after that there were no similar drownings.

The deforestation and land development of the area has had a huge negative impact on Māori. In December 2010, Ngāti Porou signed a settlement deal with the New Zealand Government for various grievances, some of which relate to the Waiapu Valley. The settlement included a NZ$110 million financial redress, and the return of sites culturally significant to the iwi totally approximately 5,898 hectares (14,570 acres).

== Current use ==
The high level of sediment in Waiapu River means it is undesirable as a source of drinking water, however local marae and small communities have been known to use the water for domestic purposes on occasion. Farmers also allow livestock to drink directly from small streams flowing into the Waiapu River. There are no consents to take, use or dam water on the river or its tributaries, however a mini-hydro power station is expected to be operating in 2012 on a small stream in the catchment area.

As very little water is taken from Waiapu River or its tributaries, the Gisborne District Council decided it was not necessary to implement the usual water plan regulating water usage in the district. However, a nationwide focus on freshwater policy means that a water plan for the river will be developed with the guidance of the Gisborne Freshwater Advisory Group. This plan is likely to be completed by 2016, and will cover "its cultural, recreational, ecological, environmental, amenity and commercial values".

Gravel deposited by the river onto shingle beaches near its mouth is extracted at approximately 12 different sites, predominantly for use on nearby rural and forestry roads.

The Waitahaia River, which flows into the Waiapu River through the Mata River, is renowned for its brown trout — a European species of fish introduced into New Zealand for fishing in the late 1860s.

== See also ==
- Waiapu Valley
- Ngāti Porou
- Gisborne Region
