= George Gage (Ringatū minister) =

George Gage or Hori Te Kou-o-rehua Keeti (probably born in 1895 or 1896 – 3 June 1961) was a New Zealand Māori healer, tohunga and Ringatū minister. He identified with the Ngāti Maniapoto, Te Whakatōhea and Te Whānau-ā-Apanui iwi. He was born in Kihikihi, Waikato, New Zealand c. 1896 and died in Ōpōtiki.
