= Ruatoria =

Town in the Gisborne District of New Zealand

Ruatoria Rua-a-Tōrea (Māori)
- Town
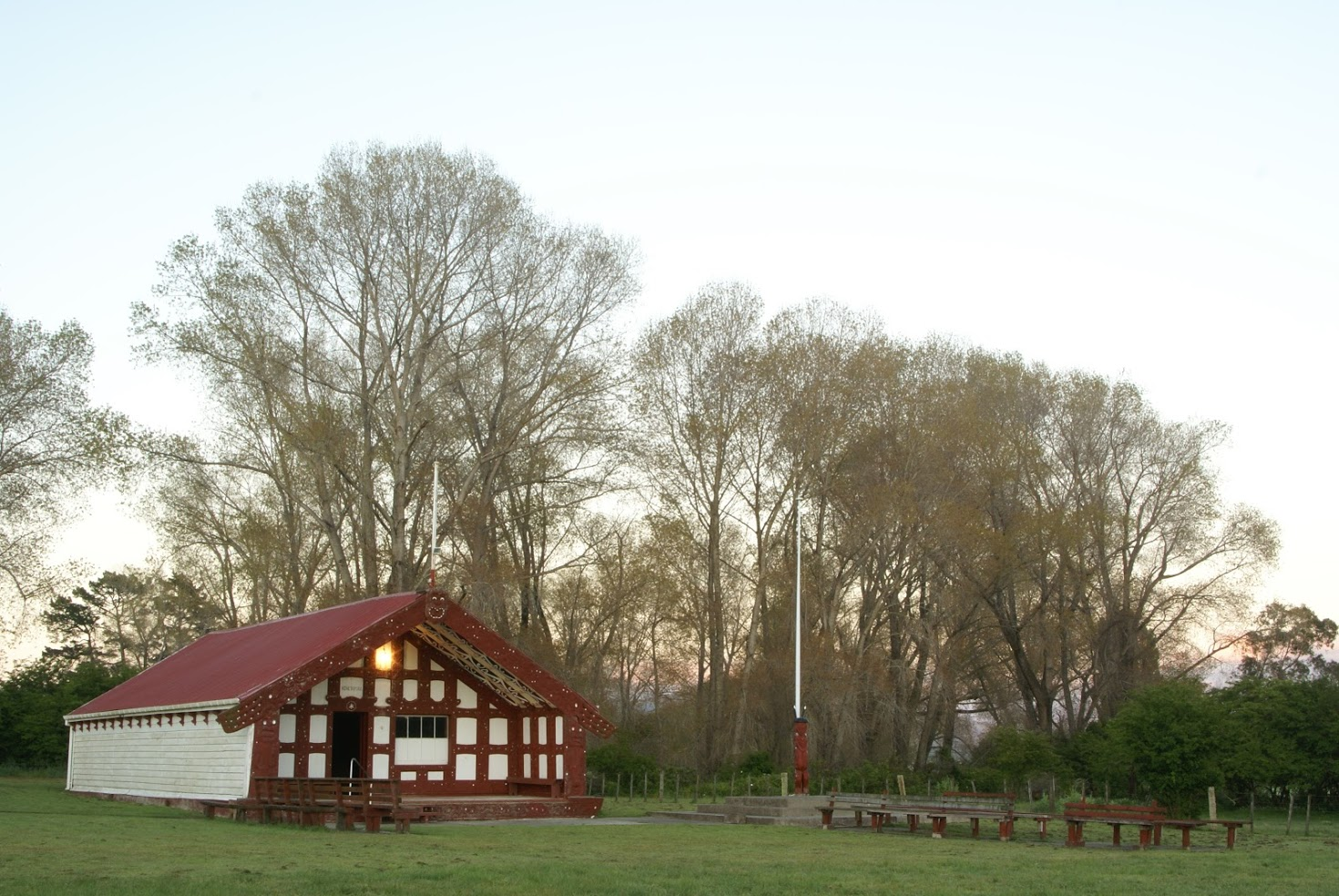
- The meeting house at the Mangahanea Marae
- Interactive map of Ruatoria
- Coordinates: 37°53′29.5″S 178°19′3″E
- Country: New Zealand
- Region: Gisborne Region
- Ward: Tairāwhiti General Ward
- Iwi (Tribe): Ngāti Porou
- Electorates: East Cape; Ikaroa-Rāwhiti (Māori)

Government
  - Territorial authority: Gisborne District Council
  - Mayor of Gisborne: Rehette Stoltz
  - East Cape MP: Dana Kirkpatrick
  - Ikaroa-Rāwhiti MP: Cushla Tangaere-Manuel

Area
  - Total: 13.19 km^{2} (5.09 sq mi)
- Highest elevation: 75 m (246 ft)
- Lowest elevation: 25 m (82 ft)

Population (June 2025)
  - Total: 910
  - Density: 69/km^{2} (180/sq mi)
- Time zone: UTC+12 (NZST)
  - Summer (DST): UTC+13 (NZDT)
- Postcode: 4032
- Area code: 06

Ruatoria (Māori: Ruatōria) is a town in the Waiapu Valley of the Gisborne Region in the northeastern corner of New Zealand's North Island. The town was originally known as Cross Roads then Manutahi and was later named Ruatorea in 1913, after the Māori master female grower Tōrea who had some of the finest storage pits in her Iwi at the time (Te-Rua-a-Tōrea). In 1925 the name was altered to "Ruatoria", although some texts retain the original spelling.

Ruatoria's Whakarua Park is the home of the East Coast Rugby Football Union.

== Demographics ==
Stats NZ describes Ruatoria as a rural settlement, which covers 13.19 km^{2} (5.09 sq mi). It had an estimated population of 910 as of June 2025, with a population density of 69 people per km^{2}. It is part of the larger Ruatoria-Raukumara statistical area.

Historical population for Ruatoria settlement
Year	Pop.	±% p.a.
2006	723	—
2013	720	−0.06%
2018	759	+1.06%
2023	876	+2.91%

Ruatōria had a population of 876 in the 2023 New Zealand census, an increase of 117 people (15.4%) since the 2018 census, and an increase of 156 people (21.7%) since the 2013 census. There were 435 males and 441 females in 237 dwellings. 0.7% of people identified as LGBTIQ+. The median age was 29.1 years (compared with 38.1 years nationally). There were 270 people (30.8%) aged under 15 years, 177 (20.2%) aged 15 to 29, 327 (37.3%) aged 30 to 64, and 102 (11.6%) aged 65 or older.

People could identify as more than one ethnicity. The results were 21.2% European (Pākehā), 94.2% Māori, 3.8% Pasifika, 1.4% Asian, and 0.7% other, which includes people giving their ethnicity as "New Zealander". English was spoken by 93.5%, Māori by 44.2%, and other languages by 1.0%. No language could be spoken by 2.4% (e.g. too young to talk). New Zealand Sign Language was known by 0.7%. The percentage of people born overseas was 3.4, compared with 28.8% nationally.

Religious affiliations were 31.8% Christian, 5.8% Māori religious beliefs, 1.7% New Age, and 1.0% other religions. People who answered that they had no religion were 49.7%, and 11.0% of people did not answer the census question.

Of those at least 15 years old, 60 (9.9%) people had a bachelor's or higher degree, 351 (57.9%) had a post-high school certificate or diploma, and 201 (33.2%) people exclusively held high school qualifications. The median income was $24,800, compared with $41,500 nationally. 15 people (2.5%) earned over $100,000 compared to 12.1% nationally. The employment status of those at least 15 was 201 (33.2%) full-time, 63 (10.4%) part-time, and 48 (7.9%) unemployed.

The town is known for its population of Maori Rastafarians.

=== Ruatoria-Raukumara statistical area ===
Ruatoria-Raukumara statistical area covers 693.32 km^{2} (267.69 sq mi) and had an estimated population of 1,510 as of June 2025, with a population density of 2.2 people per km^{2}.

Historical population for Ruatoria-Raukumara
Year	Pop.	±% p.a.
2006	1,287	—
2013	1,203	−0.96%
2018	1,233	+0.49%
2023	1,443	+3.20%

Ruatōria-Raukumara had a population of 1,443 in the 2023 New Zealand census, an increase of 210 people (17.0%) since the 2018 census, and an increase of 240 people (20.0%) since the 2013 census. There were 750 males, 690 females, and 3 people of other genders in 420 dwellings. 0.8% of people identified as LGBTIQ+. The median age was 32.8 years (compared with 38.1 years nationally). There were 408 people (28.3%) aged under 15 years, 258 (17.9%) aged 15 to 29, 570 (39.5%) aged 30 to 64, and 207 (14.3%) aged 65 or older.

People could identify as more than one ethnicity. The results were 21.0% European (Pākehā); 93.1% Māori; 4.0% Pasifika; 0.8% Asian; 0.2% Middle Eastern, Latin American and African New Zealanders (MELAA); and 1.5% other, which includes people giving their ethnicity as "New Zealander". English was spoken by 93.1%, Māori by 44.5%, Samoan by 0.2%, and other languages by 1.2%. No language could be spoken by 2.7% (e.g. too young to talk). New Zealand Sign Language was known by 0.6%. The percentage of people born overseas was 3.7, compared with 28.8% nationally.

Religious affiliations were 32.6% Christian, 6.2% Māori religious beliefs, 0.2% Buddhist, 1.2% New Age, and 1.0% other religions. People who answered that they had no religion were 48.9%, and 10.8% of people did not answer the census question.

Of those at least 15 years old, 102 (9.9%) people had a bachelor's or higher degree, 591 (57.1%) had a post-high school certificate or diploma, and 339 (32.8%) people exclusively held high school qualifications. The median income was $24,800, compared with $41,500 nationally. 27 people (2.6%) earned over $100,000 compared to 12.1% nationally. The employment status of those at least 15 was 327 (31.6%) full-time, 114 (11.0%) part-time, and 69 (6.7%) unemployed.

== Geography ==
As the crow flies, Ruatoria is approximately 90 km (56 mi) north-northeast of Gisborne, and 30 km (19 mi) southwest of the East Cape Lighthouse. By road it is 128 km (80 mi) from Gisborne, 3 km (1.9 mi) off State Highway 35. It is at the bottom of the Waiapu Valley on the banks of the Waiapu River just downstream of where the river is formed by the joining of the Mata and Tapuaeroa Rivers.

=== Climate ===
Precipitation is prodigiously high — the annual average precipitation total approaches 2,000 mm (79 in). Precipitation is heavy all year-round, yet is particularly prodigious in the austral winter months from May to September. On 7 February 1973, Ruatoria had the highest ever air temperature recorded in the North Island (39.2 °C or 102.6 °F), the same day the nation's highest temperature was recorded in the South Island town of Rangiora (42.4 °C or 108.3 °F).

Climate data for Ruatoria (1981–2010 normals, extremes 1962–1996)
Month	Jan	Feb	Mar	Apr	May	Jun	Jul	Aug	Sep	Oct	Nov	Dec	Year
Record high °C (°F)	38.9 (102.0)	39.2 (102.6)	35.0 (95.0)	28.6 (83.5)	24.6 (76.3)	22.7 (72.9)	20.4 (68.7)	21.4 (70.5)	25.2 (77.4)	31.5 (88.7)	32.5 (90.5)	35.2 (95.4)	39.2 (102.6)
Mean maximum °C (°F)	32.4 (90.3)	30.9 (87.6)	28.3 (82.9)	25.7 (78.3)	22.3 (72.1)	20.0 (68.0)	18.5 (65.3)	19.6 (67.3)	21.7 (71.1)	24.8 (76.6)	27.6 (81.7)	30.0 (86.0)	32.9 (91.2)
Mean daily maximum °C (°F)	25.0 (77.0)	24.4 (75.9)	23.0 (73.4)	20.5 (68.9)	18.1 (64.6)	15.7 (60.3)	14.8 (58.6)	15.4 (59.7)	17.3 (63.1)	19.2 (66.6)	21.1 (70.0)	23.5 (74.3)	19.8 (67.7)
Daily mean °C (°F)	19.5 (67.1)	19.2 (66.6)	17.9 (64.2)	15.3 (59.5)	12.9 (55.2)	10.6 (51.1)	9.9 (49.8)	10.5 (50.9)	12.2 (54.0)	13.9 (57.0)	15.9 (60.6)	18.1 (64.6)	14.7 (58.4)
Mean daily minimum °C (°F)	13.9 (57.0)	14.1 (57.4)	12.7 (54.9)	10.1 (50.2)	7.7 (45.9)	5.5 (41.9)	5.0 (41.0)	5.6 (42.1)	7.0 (44.6)	8.7 (47.7)	10.7 (51.3)	12.7 (54.9)	9.5 (49.1)
Mean minimum °C (°F)	7.7 (45.9)	8.1 (46.6)	5.9 (42.6)	3.2 (37.8)	0.7 (33.3)	−1.0 (30.2)	−1.9 (28.6)	−0.6 (30.9)	0.3 (32.5)	2.8 (37.0)	4.2 (39.6)	6.3 (43.3)	−2.2 (28.0)
Record low °C (°F)	5.1 (41.2)	3.3 (37.9)	2.9 (37.2)	0.3 (32.5)	−2.3 (27.9)	−4.2 (24.4)	−5.9 (21.4)	−3.1 (26.4)	−4.2 (24.4)	−0.4 (31.3)	−0.1 (31.8)	3.4 (38.1)	−5.9 (21.4)
Average rainfall mm (inches)	83.0 (3.27)	154.7 (6.09)	164.9 (6.49)	161.6 (6.36)	160.2 (6.31)	167.3 (6.59)	186.7 (7.35)	186.8 (7.35)	164.2 (6.46)	95.1 (3.74)	118.4 (4.66)	105.3 (4.15)	1,748.2 (68.82)
Source: NIWA

== Industry ==
The principal industries in the district are related to agriculture and forestry. Attempts to sink oil wells in the area in the 1920s proved unprofitable.

== History ==
The Rotokautuku Bridge, connecting Ruatoria to the northern side of Waiapu River, was built in 1964. This 1964 bridge replaced the old bridge which had been built in the 1930s. The old piles were used for the new bridge, although they had to be lowered by a metre to accommodate the new bridge.

In the 1980s, Ruatoria was briefly notorious for an outbreak of arson attacks in the town, during a period of severe economic downturn.

== Significance to Māori ==
The Ngāti Porou proverb of identity relates to the area — Ko Hikurangi te maunga, ko Waiapu te awa, ko Ngāti Porou te iwi (Hikurangi is the mountain, Waiapu is the river, Ngāti Porou is the tribe). Ruatoria is within the iwi's rohe, and Te Runanganui o Ngāti Porou has offices located in the town.

The Waiapu River is of immense cultural, spiritual, economic, and traditional value to local Māori. According to traditional beliefs, a number of taniwha dwell in and protect the river, in turn protecting the valley and its hapū. Taniwha believed to be in Waiapu River include Kotuwainuku, Kotuwairangi, Ohinewaiapu, and Ngungurutehorowhatu.

According to an affidavit of Hapukuniha Te Huakore Karaka, two taniwha were placed in strategic locations in the river to protect the hapū from invading tribes — one near Paoaruku (a locality at 37°49′38″S 178°20′21″E), and one at the Wairoa River (a small creek at 37°50′13″S 178°24′00″E). Karaka said that a bridge was built from Tikitiki to Waiomatatini, to the protest of local Māori who were concerned that it would disturb the taniwha. The night before the bridge was completed, a storm came washing the bridge away — the weather till then had been calm. From then, one person would drown in the river nearly every year. If it did not happen one year, two would drown the next. A local tohunga, George Gage (Hori Te Kou-o-rehua Keeti) was approached to help the situation, and after that there were no similar drownings.

=== Marae ===
Ruatoria has several marae belonging to Ngāti Porou hapū:

- Hiruharama Marae and Kapohanga a Rangi meeting house, a meeting place of Te Aitanga a Mate and Te Aowera.
- Te Aowera Marae and Te Poho o Te Aowera meeting house, a meeting place of Te Aowera.
- Te Horo Marae and Rākaitemania meeting house, a meeting place of Ngāti Horowai, Te Whānau a Mahaki and Te Whānau a Uruhonea.
- Kakariki Marae and Rakaihoea meeting house, a meeting place of Te Whānau a Rākaihoea.
- Kariaka Marae and Ngāti Porou meeting house, a meeting place of Ngāi Tangihaere and Te Whānau a Hinekehu.
- Mangahanea Marae and Hinetapora meeting house, a meeting place of Ngāti Uepōhatu and Te Whānau a Hinetapora.
- Mangarua or Te Heapera Marae and Te Poho o Mangarua meeting house, a meeting place of Te Whānau a Hinetapora.
- Porourangi or Waiomatatini Marae and Porourangi meeting house, a meeting place of Te Whānau a Karuai.
- Reporua Marae and Tū Auau meeting house, a meeting place of Ngāti Rangi.
- Rauru or Taumata o Mihi Marae and Rauru Nui a Toi meeting house, a meeting place of Te Whānau a Hinekehu.
- Uepohatu Marae and meeting house, a meeting place of Ngāti Uepōhatu.

In October 2020, the Government committed $5,756,639 from the Provincial Growth Fund to upgrade 29 Ngāti Porou marae, including Te Aowera Marae, Te Horo, Kariaka, Rauru, Mangahanea, Mangarua, and Reporua Marae. It also committed $273,890 to upgrade Uepohatu Marae and $232,227 to upgrade Hiruharama Marae.

== Education ==
Ngata Memorial College is a Year 1–13 co-educational public school with a roll of 91 students as of July 2026. The college opened in 1959.

Te Kura Kaupapa Māori o Te Waiu O Ngati Porou is a Year 1–13 co-educational public school with a roll of 155 students as of July 2026.

== Notable residents ==
The area was home to politician Sir Āpirana Ngata, and Te Moananui-a-Kiwa Ngārimu — the second of three Māori to receive a Victoria Cross.

== See also ==
- Waiapu Valley
- Waiapu River
- Gisborne Region
