= Raukūmara Range =

Mountain range in New Zealand

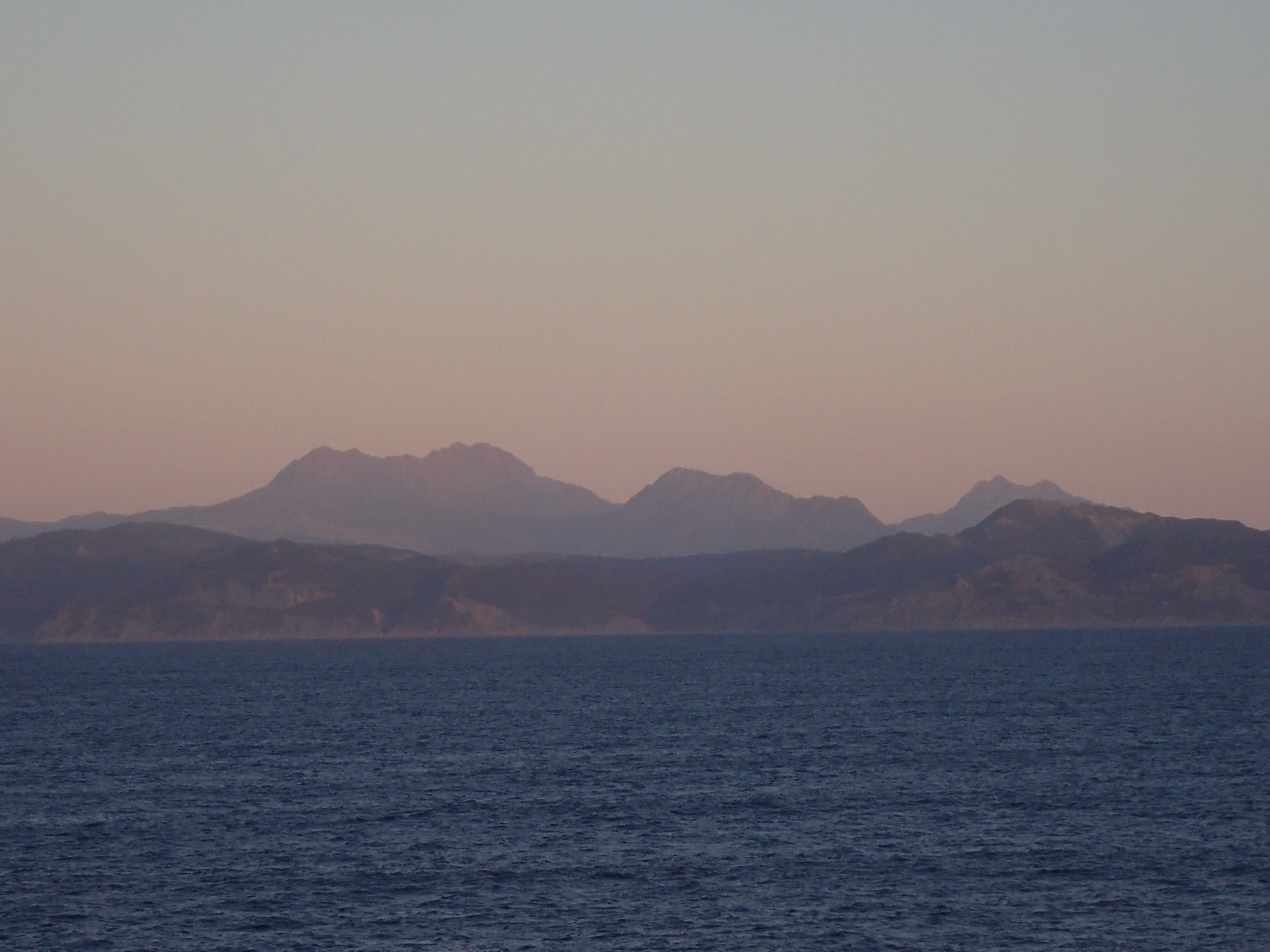
- Hikurangi and nearby mountains in the Raukūmara Range viewed from the Pacific Ocean to the east

Highest point
- Peak: Hikurangi
- Elevation: 1,752 m (5,748 ft)
- Coordinates: 37°47′S 178°02′E

Dimensions
- Length: 110 km (68 mi) Northeast-Southwest
- Width: 40 km (25 mi)

Naming
- Etymology: From te reo Māori, unclear etymology

Geography
- Location within New Zealand
- Country: New Zealand

Geology
- Formed by: Tectonic uplift
- Rock age(s): Raukumara Epoch, Cretaceous era
- Rock types: Greywacke, Argillite, Siltstone and Sandstone

The Raukūmara Range runs from the north-eastern end of the Huiarau Range north-eastward to Wharekahika / Hicks Bay, between Cape Runaway and East Cape, at the northern end of the Gisborne District, on the North Island of New Zealand. It is the north-northeastern end segment of the North Island's main mountain chain, which runs from Wellington in the south to the Gisborne District. The western side of the range is in the Ōpōtiki District of the eastern Bay of Plenty and the eastern side in the East Coast region of the Gisborne District. State Highway 2 runs between the Raukūmara Range and the Huiarau Range on its route between the town of Ōpōtiki and the city of Gisborne.

The mountain range is composed primarily of Cretaceous greywacke, argillites, siltstones and sandstones. The Raukumara Epoch, an epoch of the New Zealand geologic time scale lasting from 95.2 to 86.5 Mya, is named after the range.

The North Island's highest non-volcanic peak, Mount Hikurangi (1,755 m/5,758 ft), is part of the range. Other prominent peaks include Maungahaumi (1,213 m/3,980 ft), Mount Arowhana (1,440 m/4,720 ft), and Mount Raukūmara (1,413 m/4,636 ft).

== See also ==
- Geology of the Raukumara region
