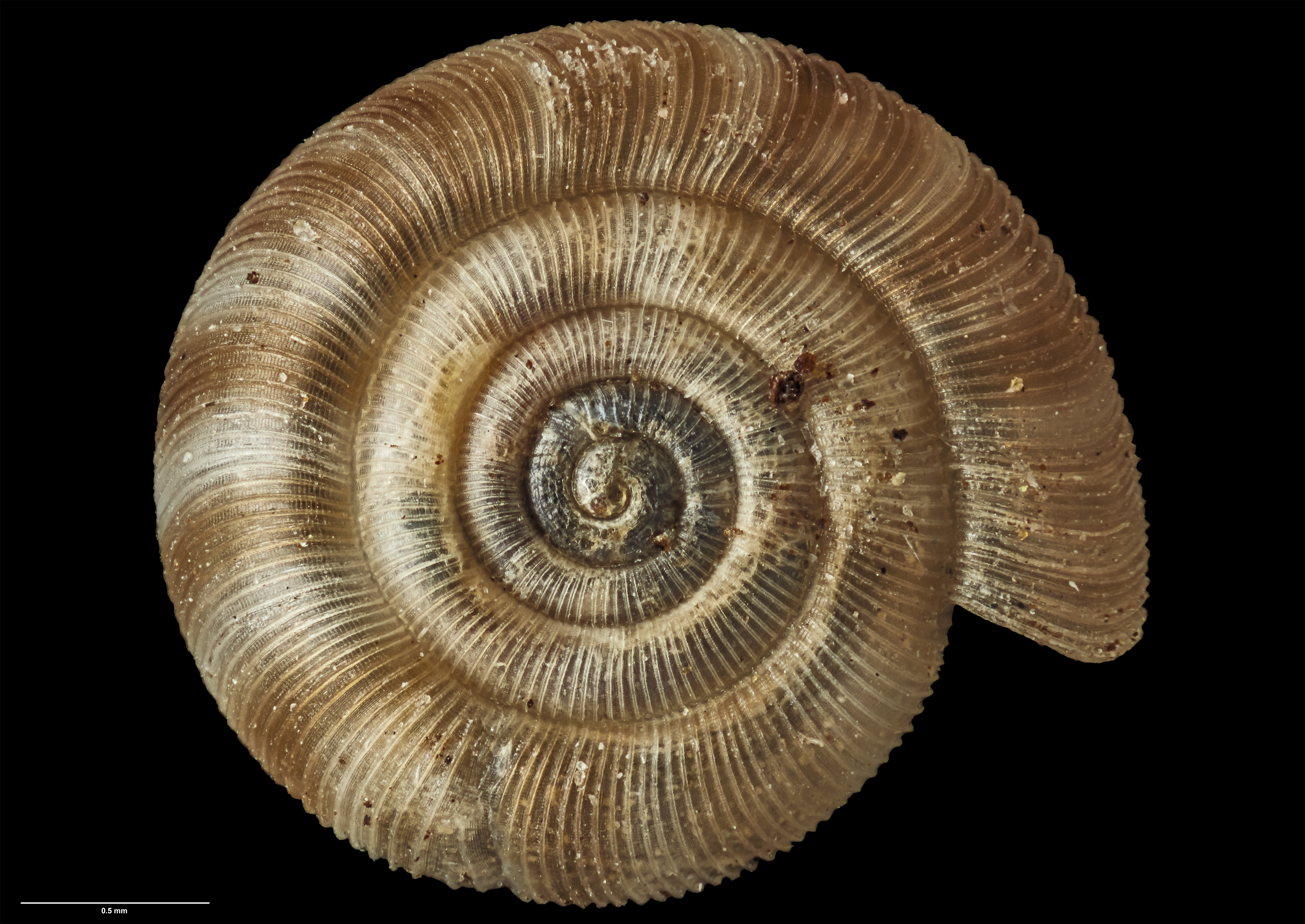
- Holotype from the Auckland War Memorial Museum

Scientific classification
- Kingdom: Animalia
- Phylum: Mollusca
- Class: Gastropoda
- Order: Stylommatophora
- Superfamily: Punctoidea
- Family: Charopidae
- Genus: Climocella
- Species: C. intermedia

Binomial name
- Climocella intermedia Goulstone, 1997

= Climocella intermedia =

Species of land snail

Climocella intermedia is a species of land snail belonging to the family Charopidae. Endemic to New Zealand, the species is found in association with fallen logs in forests in the eastern Bay of Plenty and the Gisborne District.

== Description ==
C. intermedia has a shell that measures up to 2.7 mm (0.11 in) by 1.3 mm (0.051 in), with a subdiscoidal shell of 4.25 whorls that increase in size. The shell's spire is flat or slightly sunken, and the protoconch has 1.75 whorls with the first whorl having eight spiral lirae. The shells are coloured with narrow amber-brown radial bands. It can be differentiated from C. akarana due to the shells always having a flat or depressed spite, straight widely spaced axials found on the protoconch, and differences in terminal genitalia.

== Taxonomy ==
The species was first described by James Frederick Goulstone in 1996, who named the species due to its appearance being half-way between that of C. akarana and C. waenga. Pauline C. Mayhill collected the holotype of the species from Papatea Bay in the Ōpōtiki District, New Zealand on 1 September 1992, which is held by the Auckland War Memorial Museum.

== Distribution and habitat ==
C. intermedia is endemic to New Zealand, found in forests in the eastern Bay of Plenty and the northern Gisborne District, typically in friable soil underneath fallen logs, or in bark crevices.

== Gallery ==
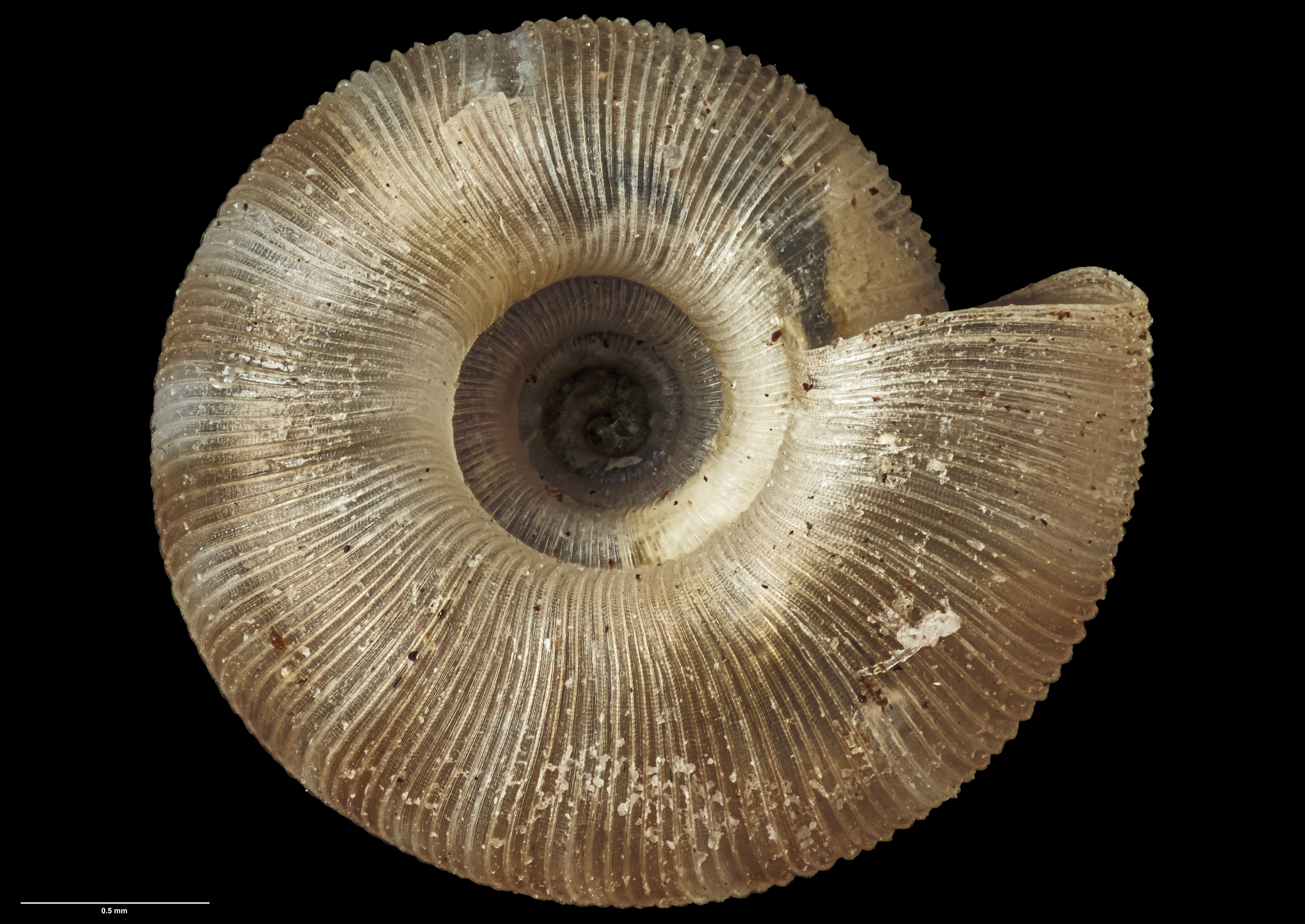
Underside view of holotype

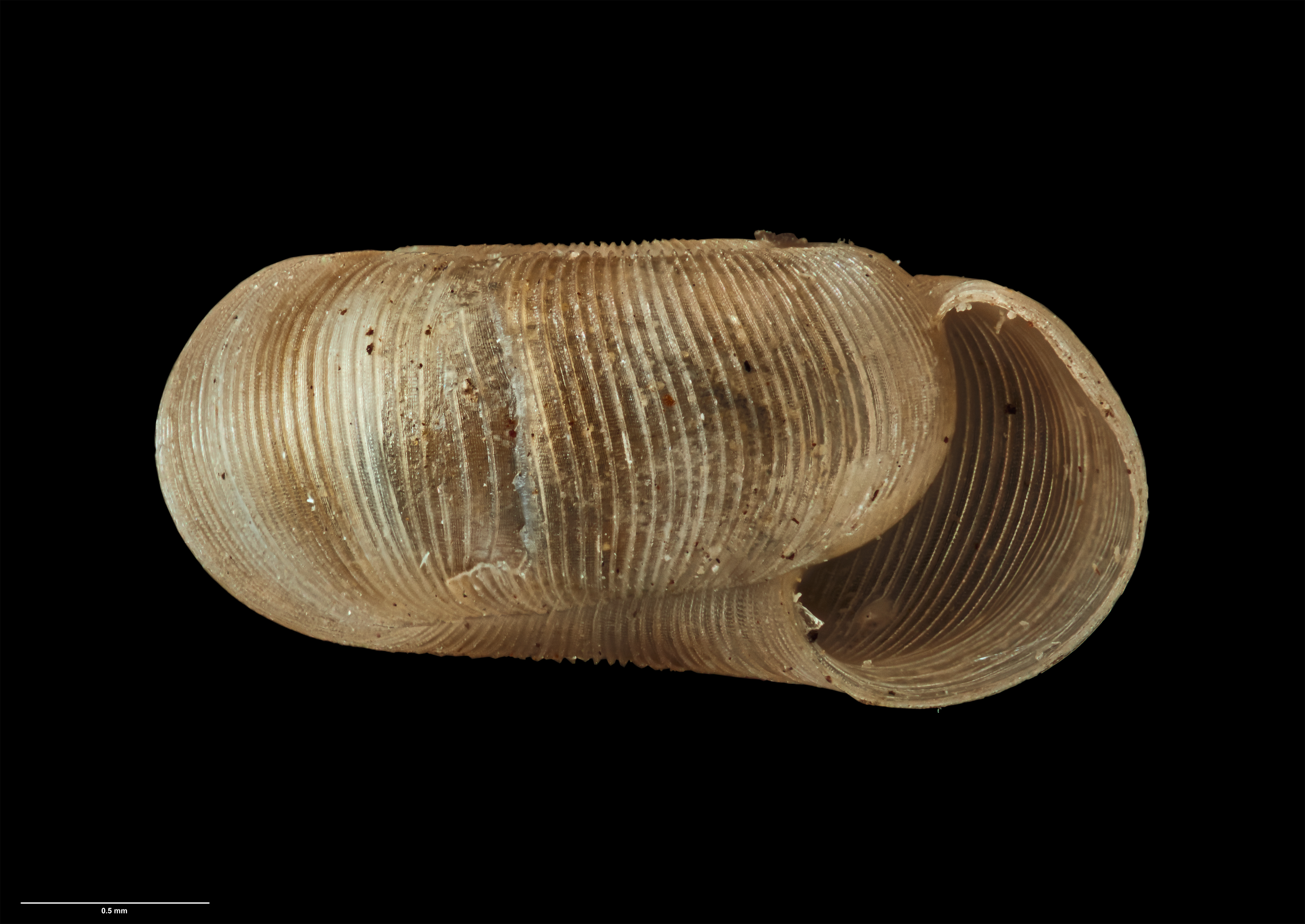
Side view of holotype
