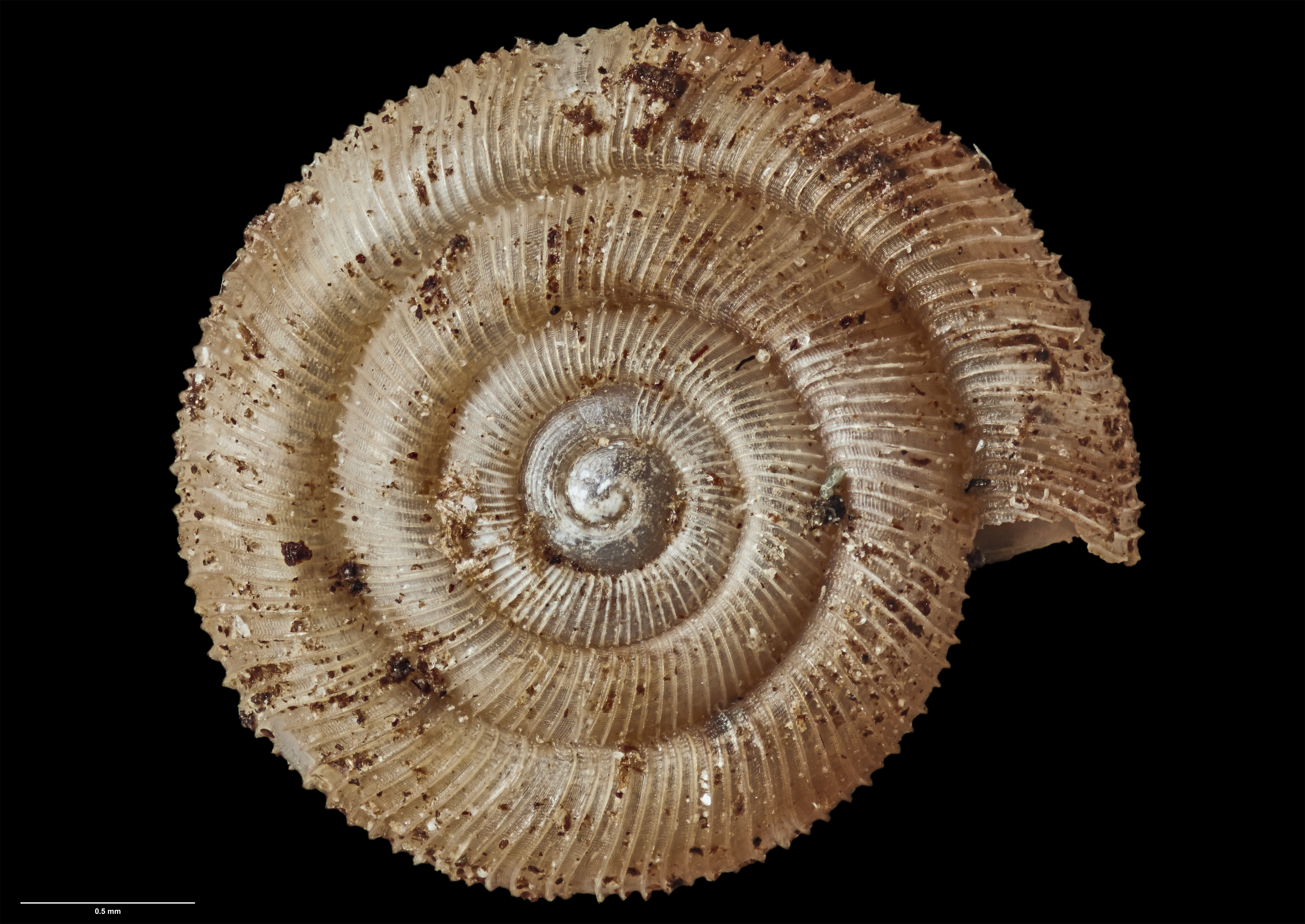
- Holotype from the Auckland War Memorial Museum

Scientific classification
- Kingdom: Animalia
- Phylum: Mollusca
- Class: Gastropoda
- Order: Stylommatophora
- Superfamily: Punctoidea
- Family: Charopidae
- Genus: Climocella
- Species: C. cavelliaformis

Binomial name
- Climocella cavelliaformis Goulstone, 1996

= Climocella cavelliaformis =

Species of land snail

Climocella cavelliaformis is a species of land snail belonging to the family Charopidae. Endemic to New Zealand, the species is found in the upper North Island, often in association with decomposing logs.

== Description ==
C. cavelliaformis has a shell that measures 2.8 mm (0.11 in) by 1.5 mm (0.059 in), which has up to four subdiscoidal slightly compressed whorls and a flat spire. The shells have a protoconch of 1.25 whorls, and 9-10 spiral lirae which are crossed by two weak oblique axials on the last section. The animal is white, with some stringy pigmentation over its stomach area. It closely resembles C. akarana, but can be distinguished due to C. cavelliaformis having a righter coil with distinct ribs and different protoconch detail.

== Taxonomy ==
The species was first described by James Frederick Goulstone in 1995, naming the species after the genus Cavellia, due to the species having axial ribs that have some similarity to the genus. B.F. Hazelwood collected the holotype of the species from regenerating native forest located between Waiwera and Puhoi on 4 June 1990, and is held by the Auckland War Memorial Museum.

== Distribution and habitat ==
C. cavelliaformis is endemic to New Zealand, found in upper North Island in the Auckland Region and Northland Region, and on Motutapu Island, and most abundantly found near Waiwera. The species is typically found in association with fallen nīkau palm fronds.

== Gallery ==
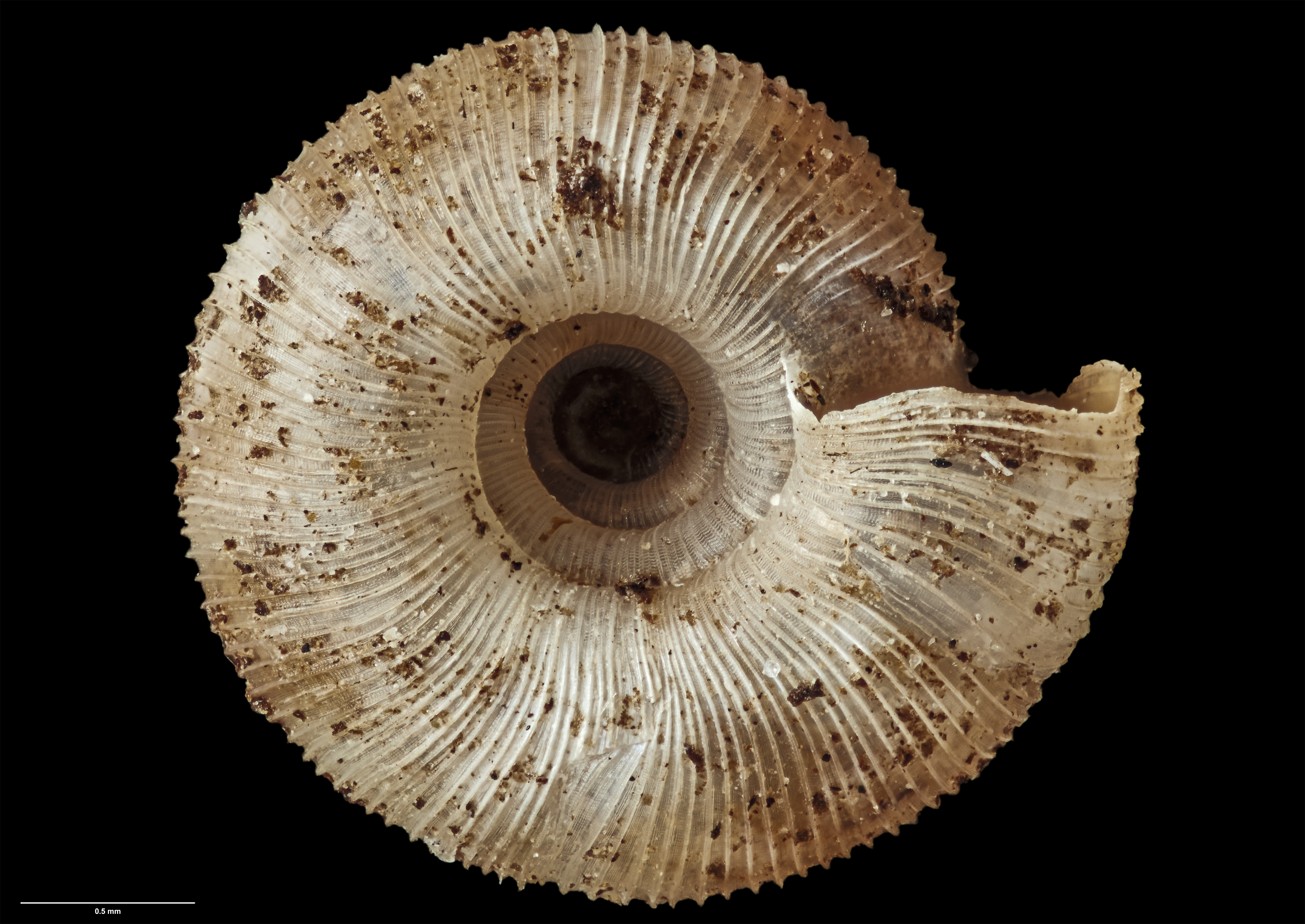
Underside view of holotype

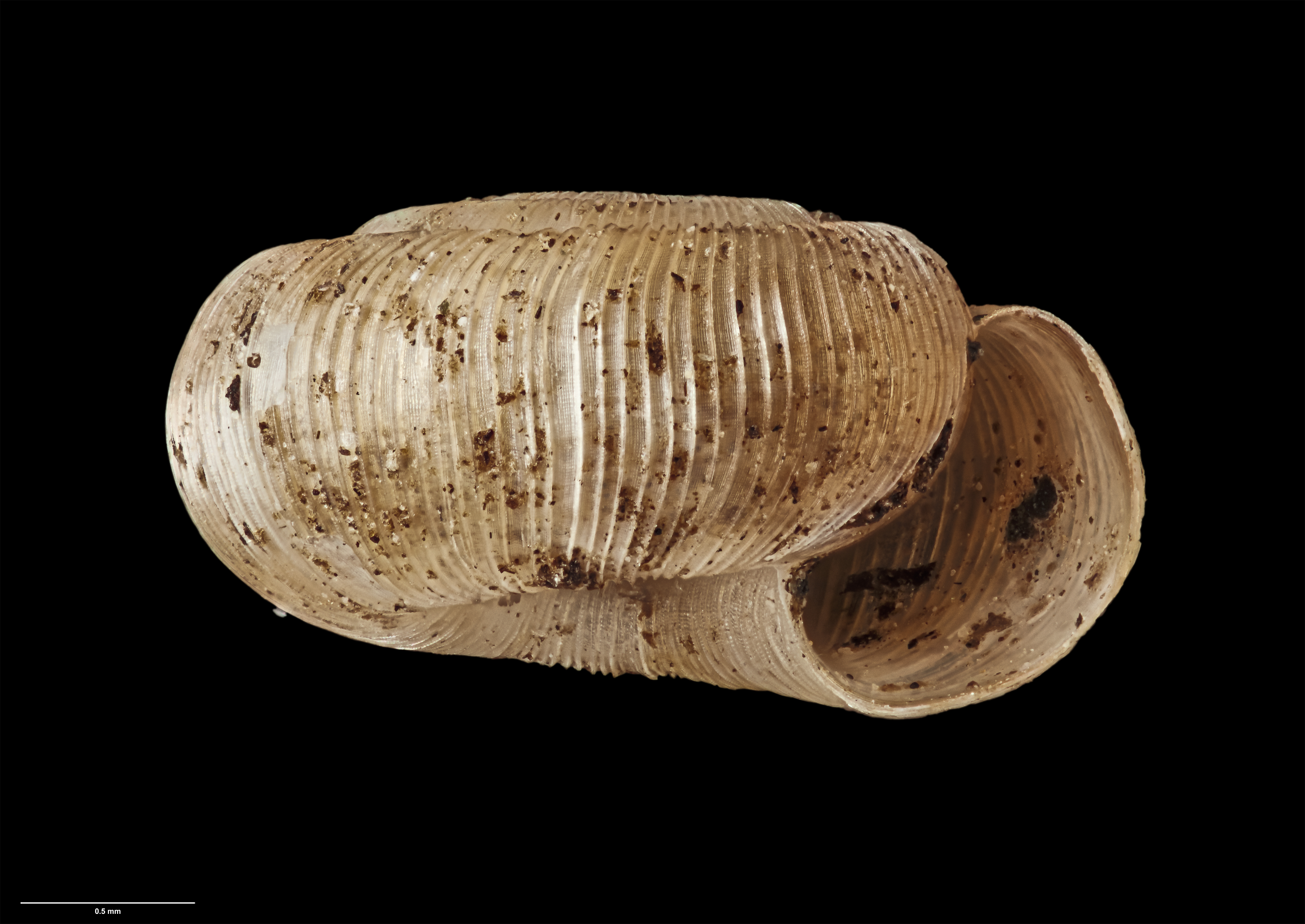
Side view of holotype
