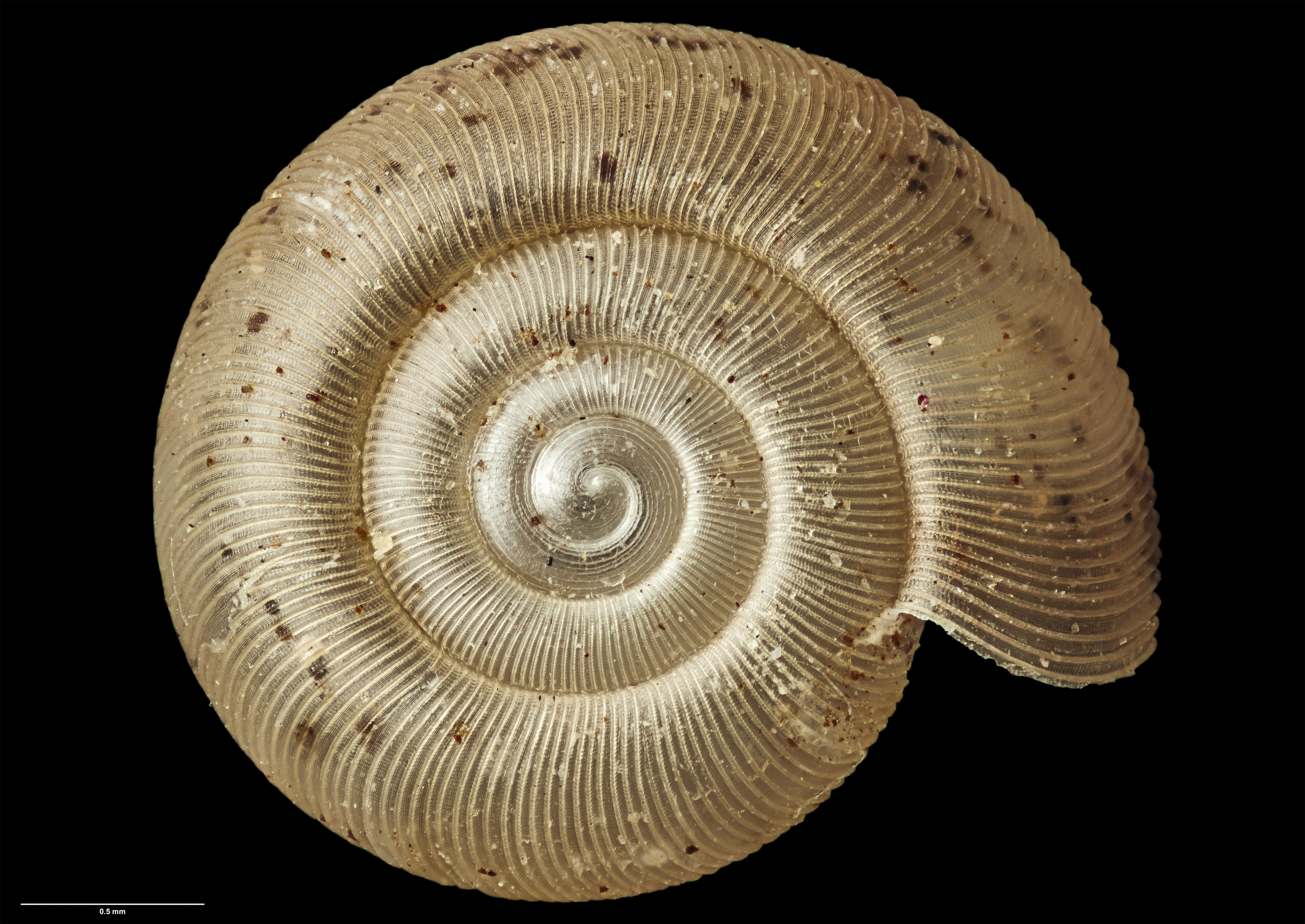
- Holotype from the Auckland War Memorial Museum

Scientific classification
- Kingdom: Animalia
- Phylum: Mollusca
- Class: Gastropoda
- Order: Stylommatophora
- Superfamily: Punctoidea
- Family: Charopidae
- Genus: Climocella
- Species: C. kaitaka

Binomial name
- Climocella kaitaka Goulstone, 1996

= Climocella kaitaka =

Species of land snail

Climocella kaitaka is a species of land snail belonging to the family Charopidae. Endemic to New Zealand, the species is found in the Auckland and Waikato Regions, often in association with C. akarana.

== Description ==
C. kaitaka has a shell that measures up to 2.8 mm (0.11 in) by 1.4 mm (0.055 in), which has a unicoloured shell of four whorls, and a protoconch of 1.25 whorls with 9-10 spiral lirae. It can be identified due to its fine ribbing and secondary protoconch radials.

== Taxonomy ==
The species was first described by James Frederick Goulstone in 1995, who named the species after kaitaka, a traditional Māori cloak. Goulstone collected the holotype of the species from Ngaheretuku Reserve near Clevedon on 1 October 1985, which is held by the Auckland War Memorial Museum.

== Ecology ==
The species is often found alongside C. akarana.

== Distribution and habitat ==
C. kaitaka is endemic to New Zealand, found in the upper North Island in the Auckland Region and Waikato Region, including the Coromandel Peninsula, Hauraki Gulf Islands, and the Mercury Islands. It lives in a wide range of habitats, ranging from dry to moist, and appears more commonly in limestone from the western Waikato Region.

== Gallery ==
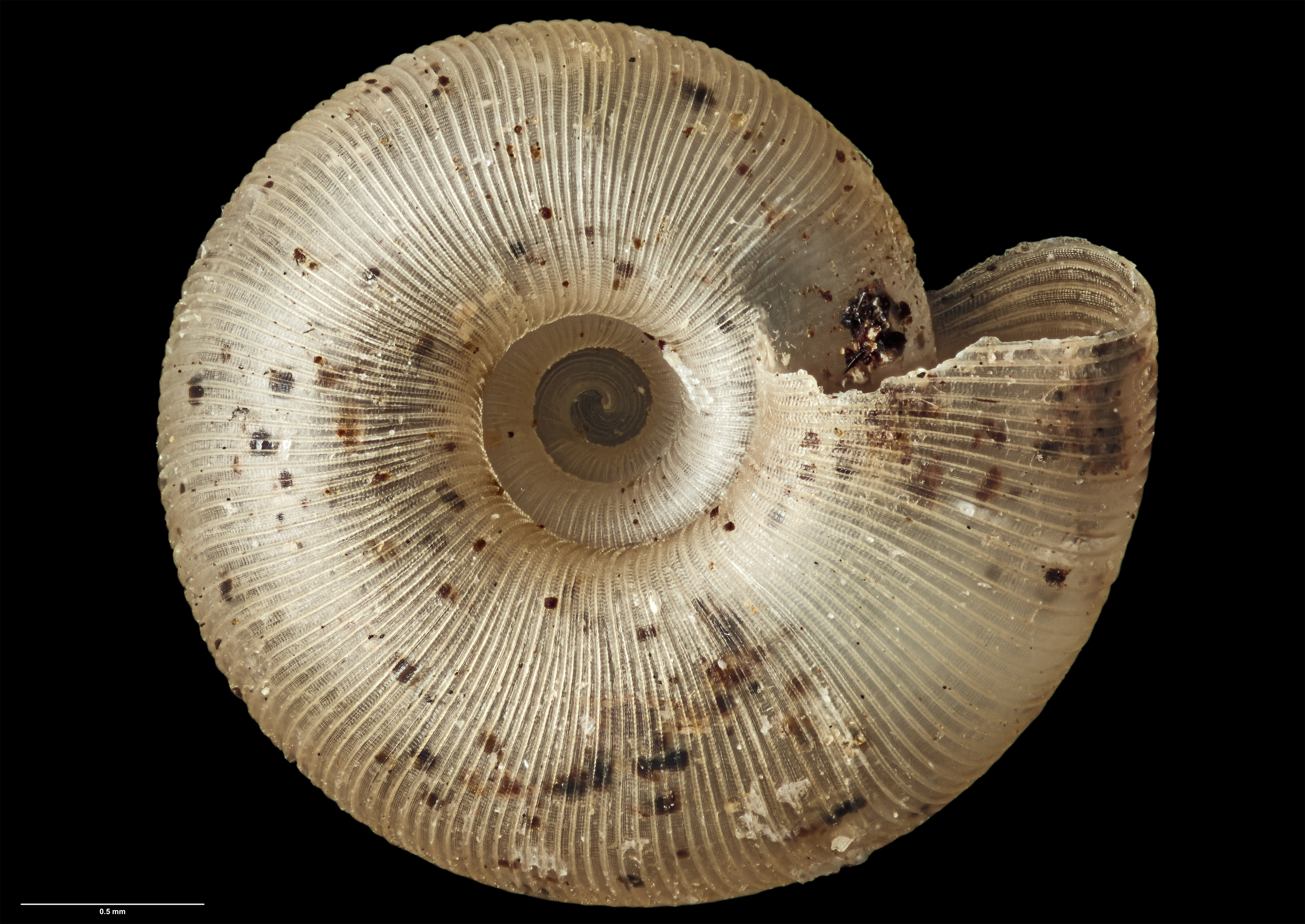
Underside view of holotype

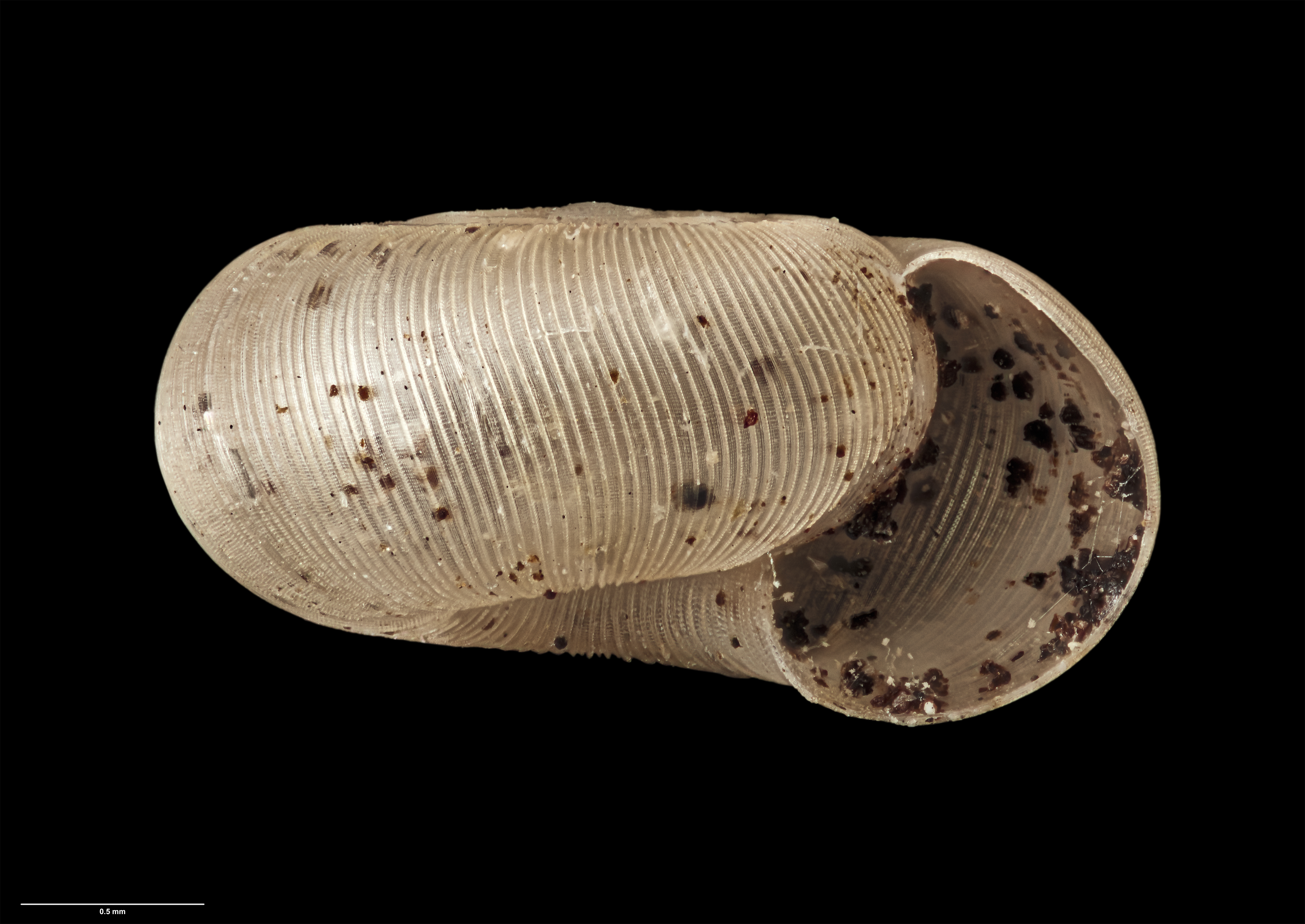
Side view of holotype
