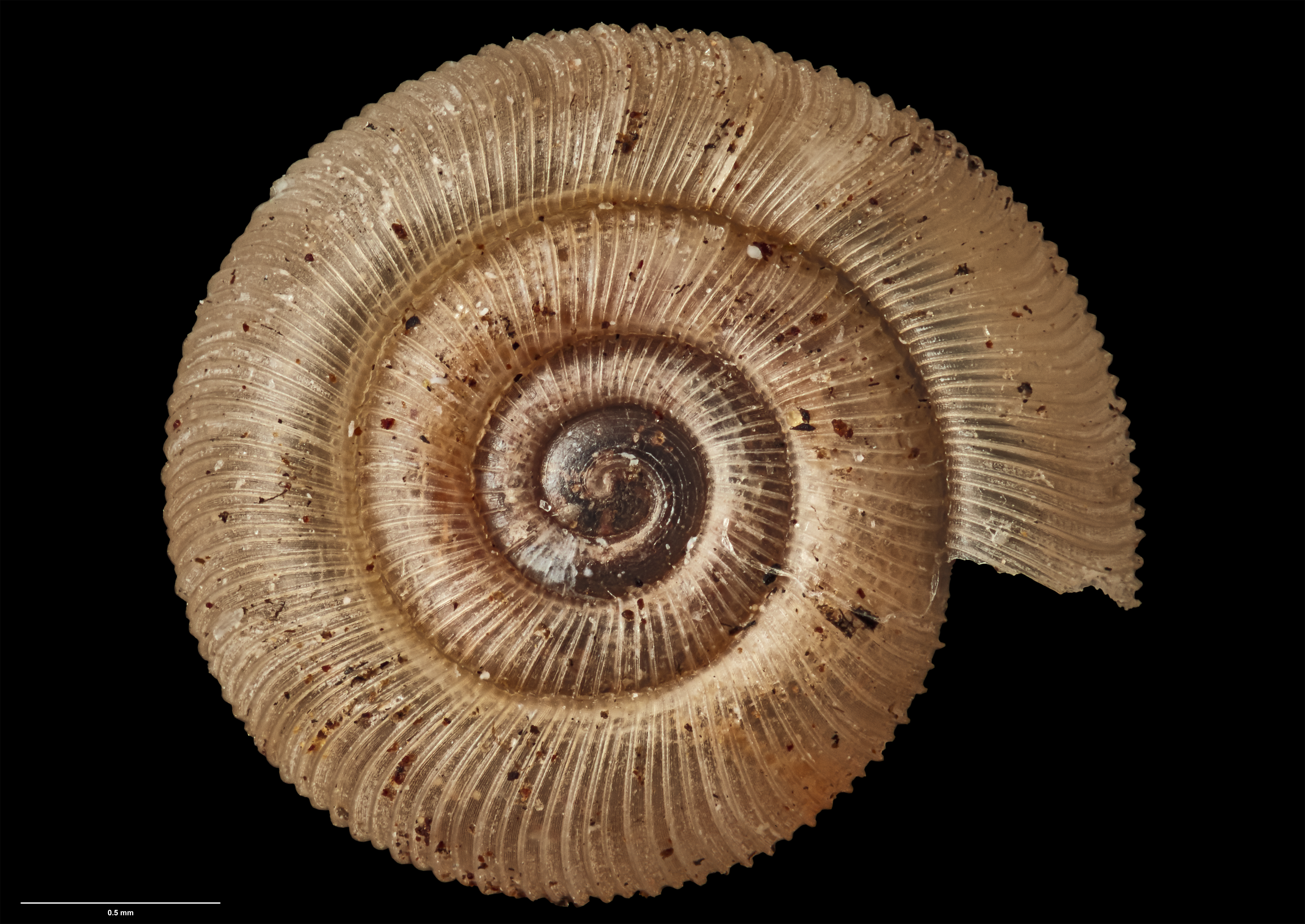
- Holotype from the Auckland War Memorial Museum

Scientific classification
- Kingdom: Animalia
- Phylum: Mollusca
- Class: Gastropoda
- Order: Stylommatophora
- Superfamily: Punctoidea
- Family: Charopidae
- Genus: Climocella
- Species: C. runga

Binomial name
- Climocella runga Goulstone, 1997

= Climocella runga =

Species of land snail

Climocella runga is a species of land snail belonging to the family Charopidae. Endemic to Northland, New Zealand, the species is found in areas of thicker forest cover.

== Description ==
C. runga has a shell that measures up to 2.4 mm (0.094 in) by 1.3 mm (0.051 in), with a subdiscoidal shell of four whorls; the first two being narrow and depressed, followed by an expanded and raised third whorl, and an expanded and dropping forth whorl. The protoconch has 1.5 whorls with the first 1.25 whorls having six spiral lirae. The shells are uniformly cream in colour.

== Taxonomy ==
The species was first described by James Frederick Goulstone in 1996, who named the species after the Māori language word runga, meaning "above". Mayhill collected the holotype of the species from Unuwhao near Spirits Bay, on the Aupōuri Peninsula in Northland, New Zealand on 10 May 1991. The holotype is held by the Auckland War Memorial Museum.

== Distribution and habitat ==
C. runga is endemic to New Zealand, known to occur on the Aupōuri Peninsula, and on Motuwharariki Island in the Bay of Islands. The species is typically found in higher altitude sites on the peninsula in areas with thicker forest cover, in association with broadleaf, broadleaf-podocarp and mature kānuka forests.

== Gallery ==
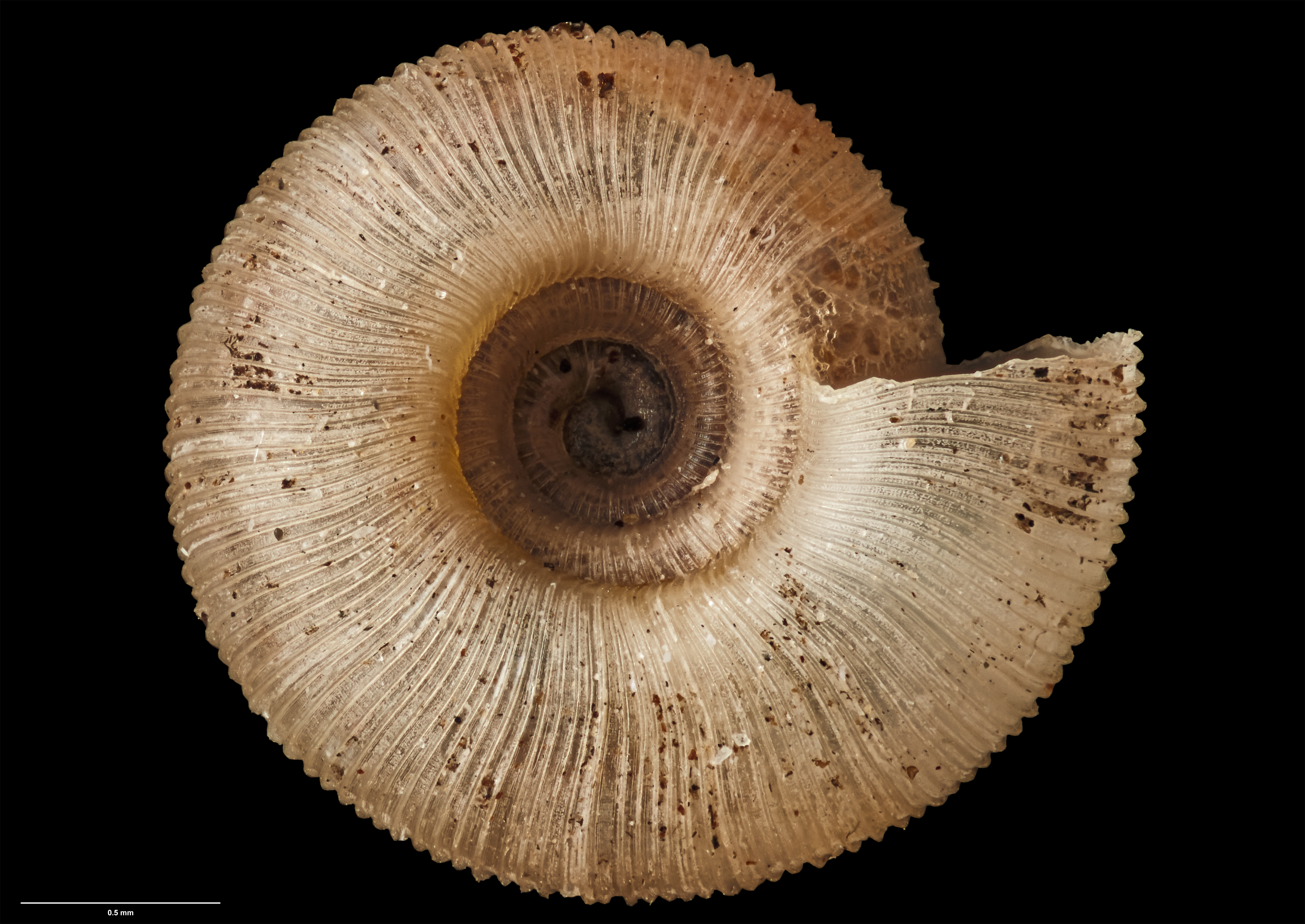
Underside view of holotype

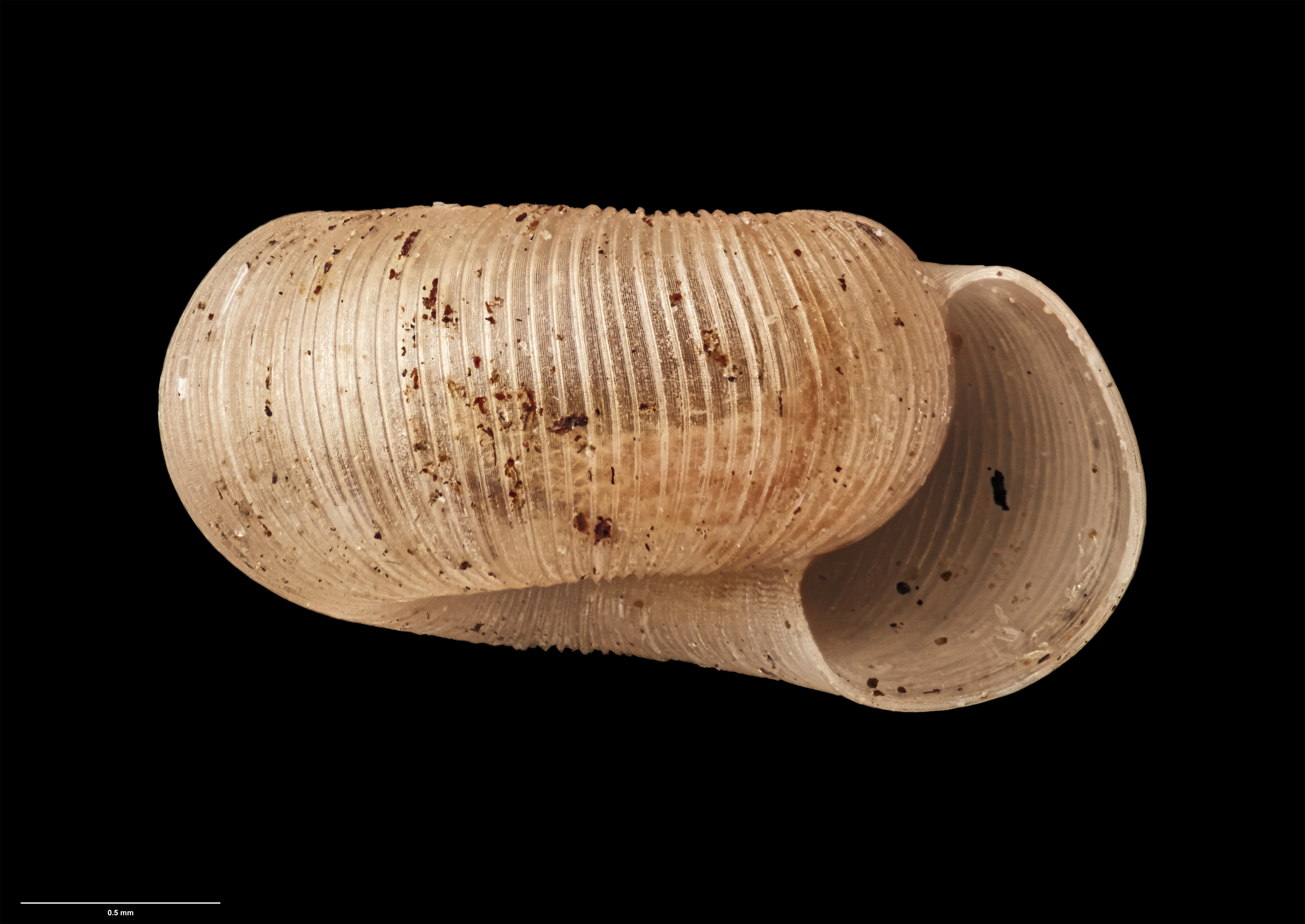
Side view of holotype
