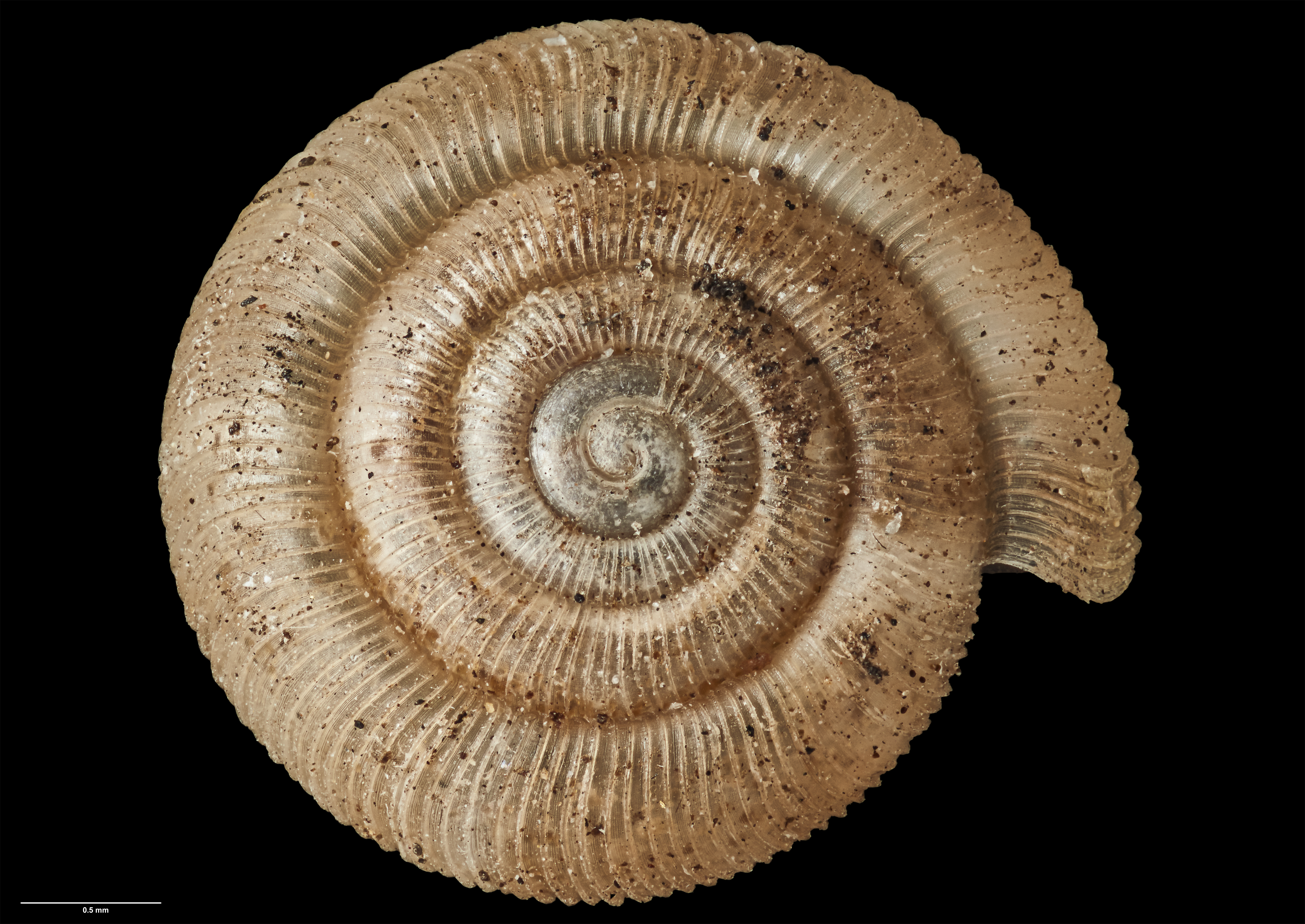
- Holotype from the Auckland War Memorial Museum

Scientific classification
- Kingdom: Animalia
- Phylum: Mollusca
- Class: Gastropoda
- Order: Stylommatophora
- Superfamily: Punctoidea
- Family: Charopidae
- Genus: Climocella
- Species: C. haurakiensis

Binomial name
- Climocella haurakiensis Goulstone, 1996

= Climocella haurakiensis =

Species of land snail

Climocella haurakiensis is a species of land snail belonging to the family Charopidae. Endemic to New Zealand, the species is found in the Hauraki Gulf islands and surrounding mainland areas. It may be a carnivorous snail.

== Description ==
C. haurakiensis has a shell that measures up to 3.5 mm (0.14 in) by 2.1 mm (0.083 in), which has up to 4.5 subdiscoidal whorls, a flat or slightly raised spire, and a final slightly accelerated and dropping whorl. The shells have a protoconch of 1.25 whorls, and 9-10 spiral lirae. The shell resembles C. rata, but can be distinguished due to having a lack of colour, its larger size, and the shells tending to be more domed.

== Taxonomy ==
The species was first described by James Frederick Goulstone in 1995, who named the species after the Hauraki Gulf, due to the species being most commonly found on the islands and margins of the gulf. While the animal is distinctly different from other members of Climocella, Goulstone described it as a member of the genus due to the strong shell resemblance. G. Sadler collected the holotype of the species from leaf litter on Ōtata Island in the Noises island group in the Auckland Region, and is held by the Auckland War Memorial Museum.

== Ecology ==
The species' large buccal mass and developed salivory glands suggest that it may be carnivorous.

== Distribution and habitat ==
C. haurakiensis is endemic to New Zealand, found in the Hauraki Gulf islands, the Coromandel Peninsula, and on the North Island in the Hunua Ranges and on the North Shore of Auckland.

== Gallery ==
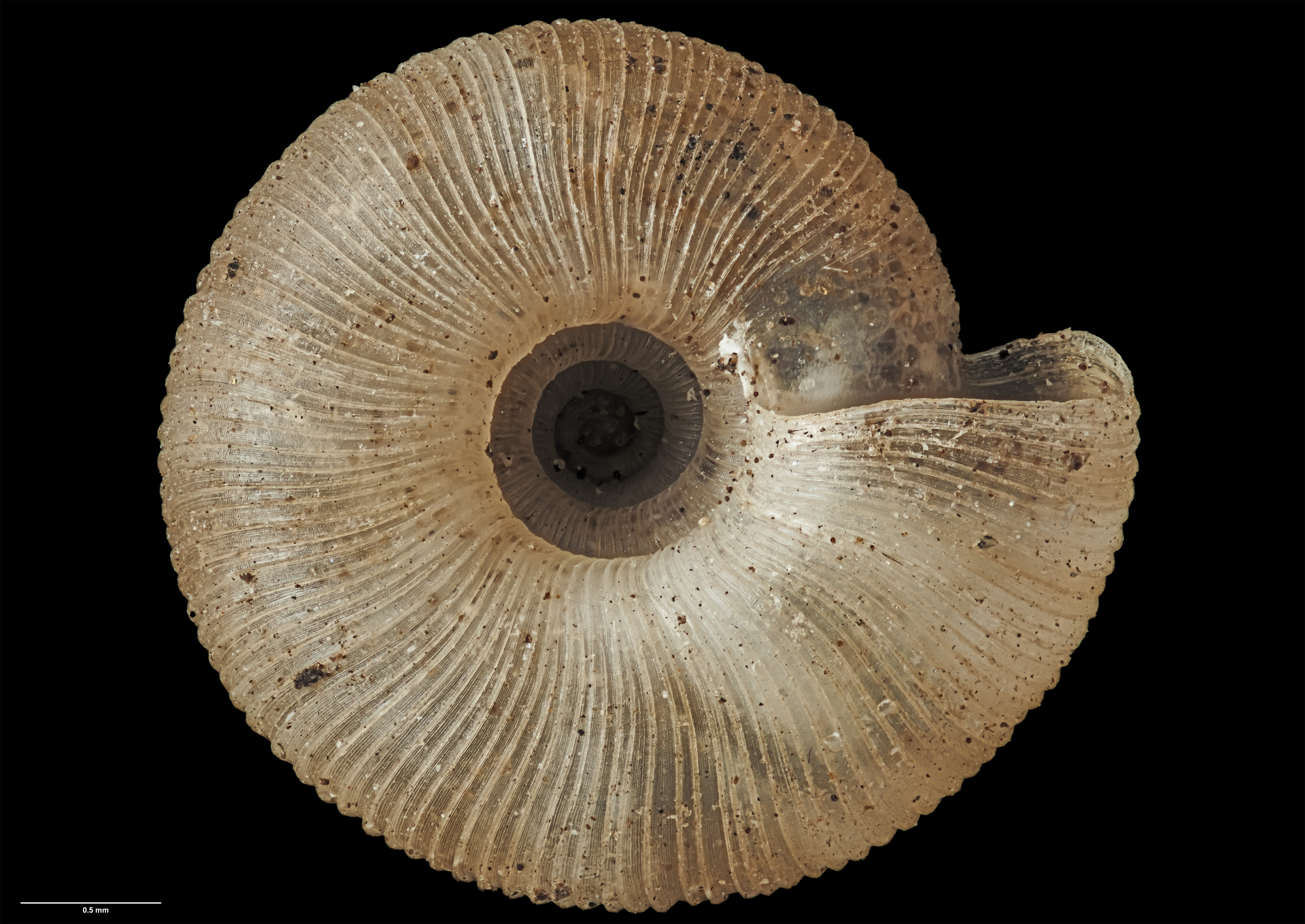
Underside view of holotype

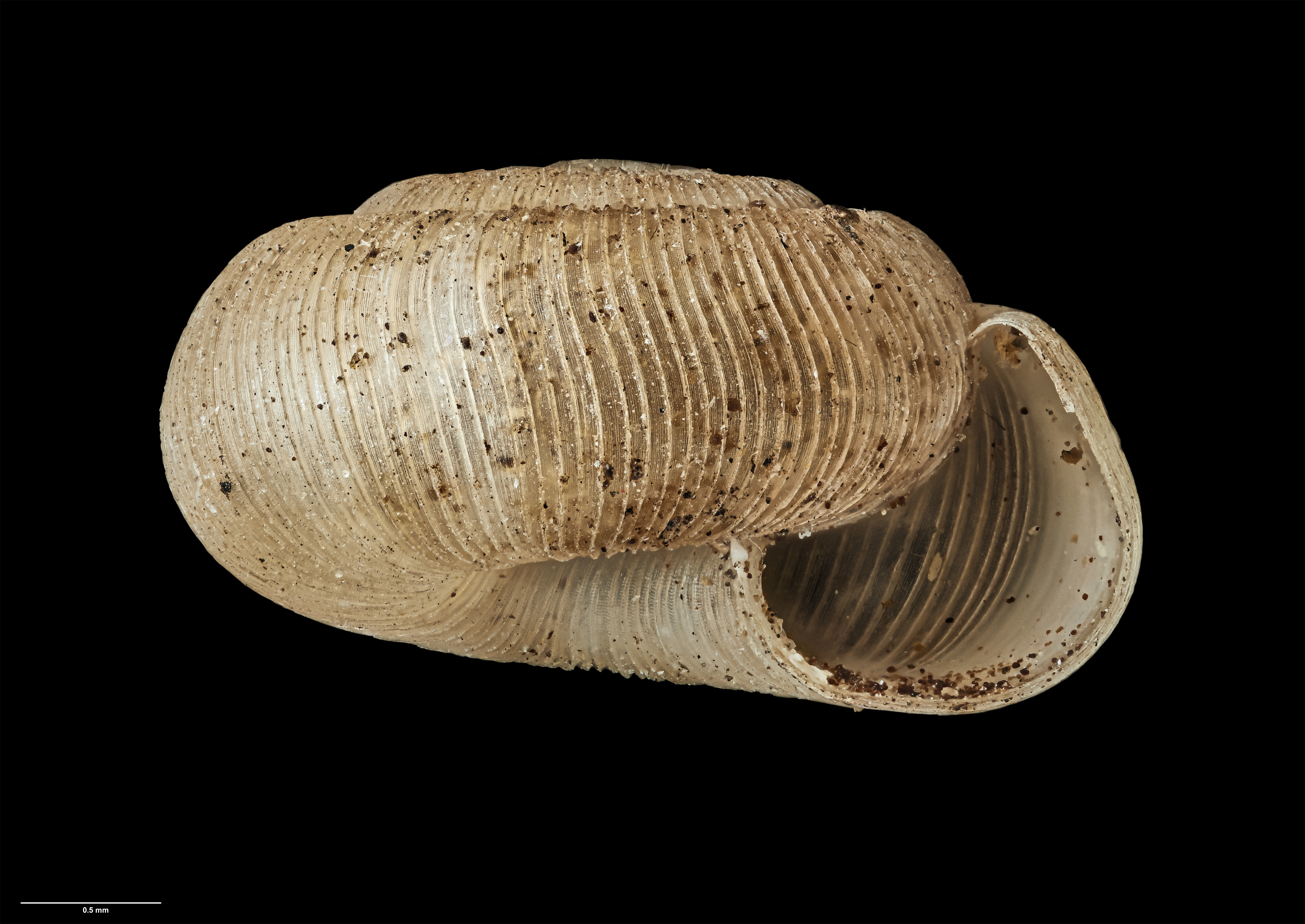
Side view of holotype
