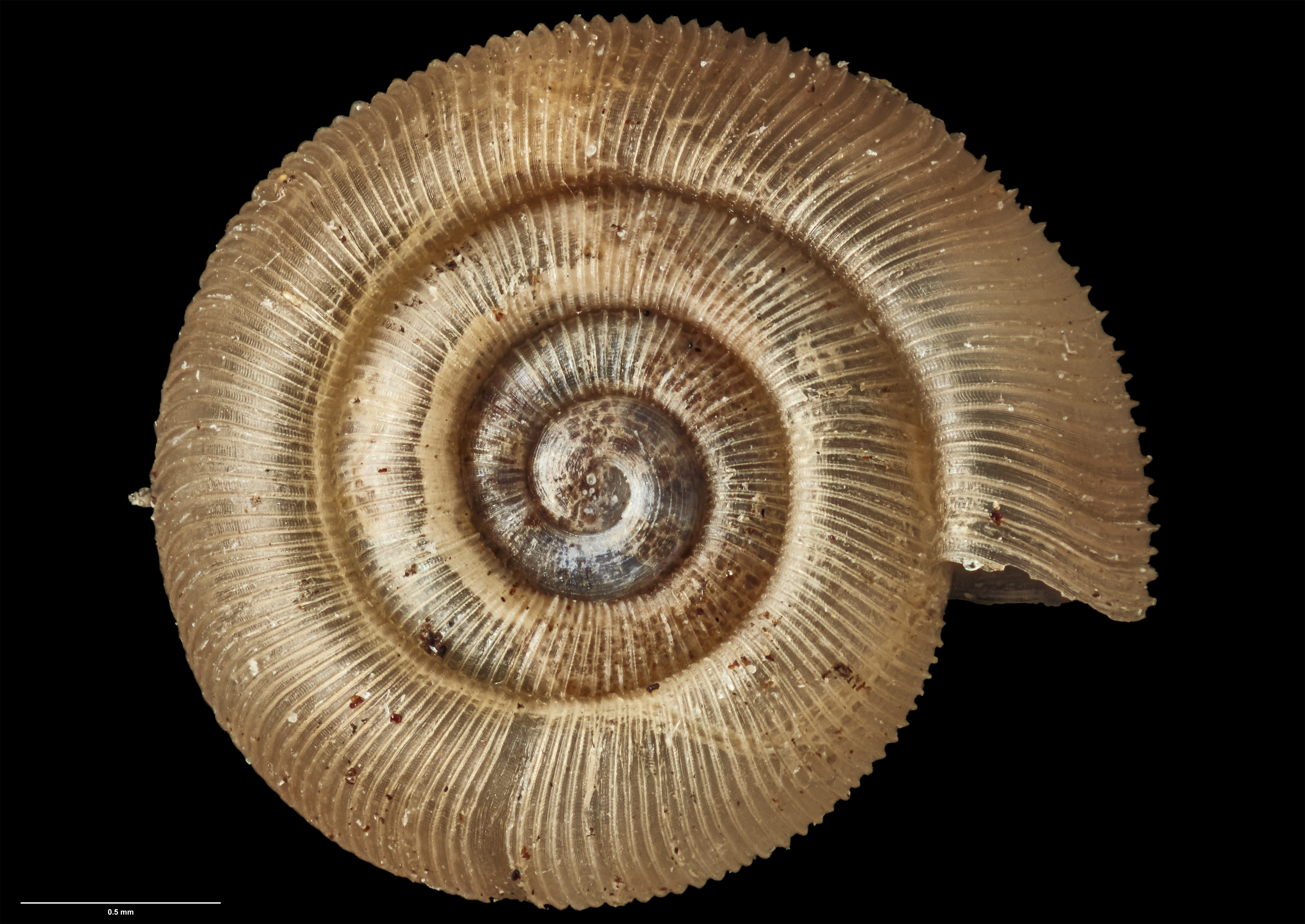
- Holotype from the Auckland War Memorial Museum

Scientific classification
- Kingdom: Animalia
- Phylum: Mollusca
- Class: Gastropoda
- Order: Stylommatophora
- Superfamily: Punctoidea
- Family: Charopidae
- Genus: Climocella
- Species: C. mayhillae

Binomial name
- Climocella mayhillae Goulstone, 1997

= Climocella mayhillae =

Species of land snail

Climocella mayhillae is a species of land snail belonging to the family Charopidae. Endemic to New Zealand, the species is found in inland and coastal forested areas of Northland, often in association with podocarp tree bank.

== Description ==
C. mayhillae has a shell that measures up to 2.7 mm (0.11 in) by 1.4 mm (0.055 in), with a subdiscoidal shell of four whorls that increase in size. The shell's spire is flat, and the protoconch has 1.75 whorls with the first and last quarter whorl having nine spiral lirae. The shells are uniformly brown in colour.

== Taxonomy ==
The species was first described by James Frederick Goulstone in 1996, who named the species after Pauline C. Mayhill. Mayhill collected the holotype of the species from Ngaiotonga Reserve in Northland, New Zealand on 1 March 1996. The holotpye is held by the Auckland War Memorial Museum.

== Distribution and habitat ==
C. mayhillae is endemic to New Zealand, found in inland and coastal forested areas of the Northland Region. The species is typically found in inland forested locations, in association with the bark of podocarp trees.

== Gallery ==
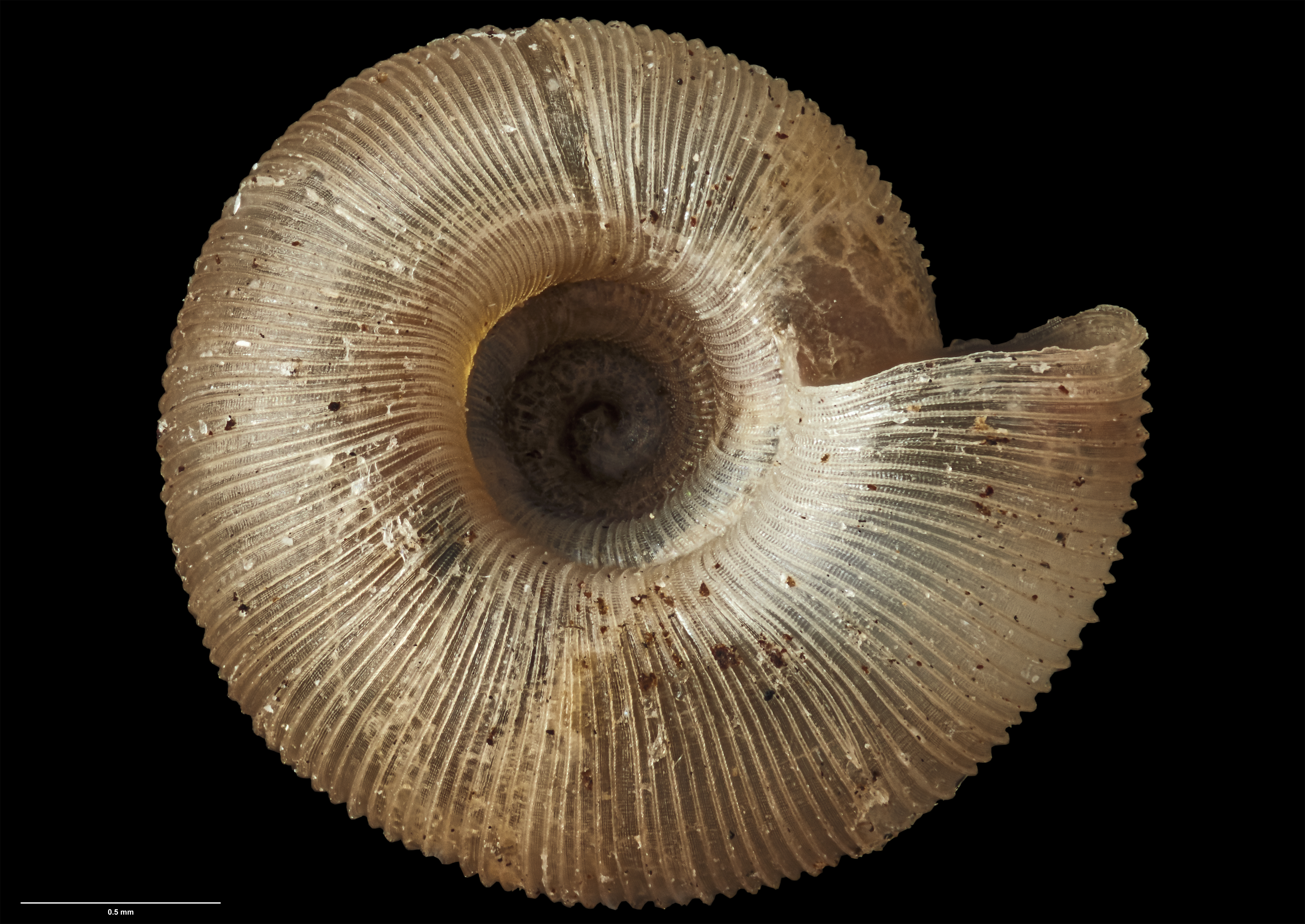
Underside view of holotype

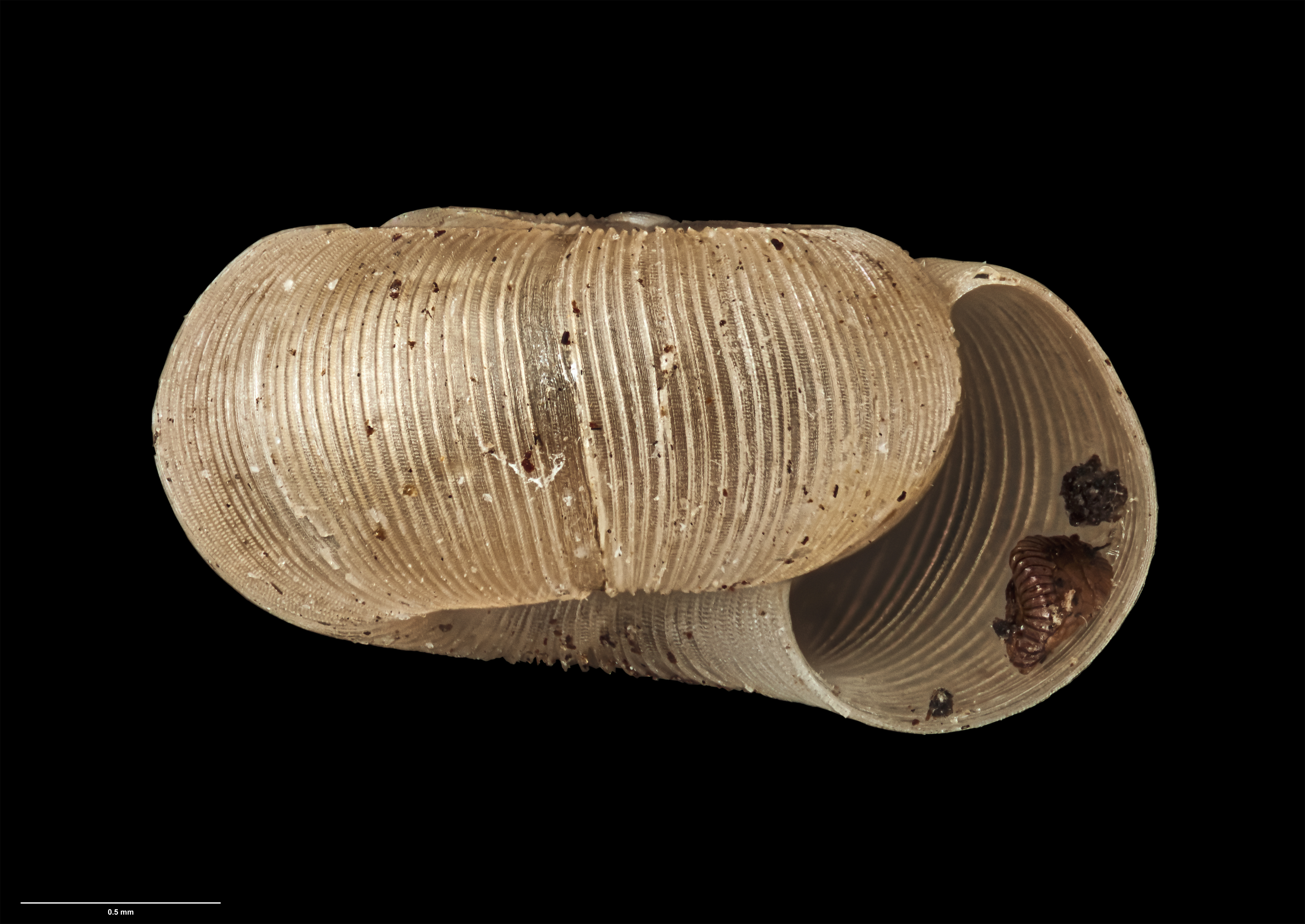
Side view of holotype
