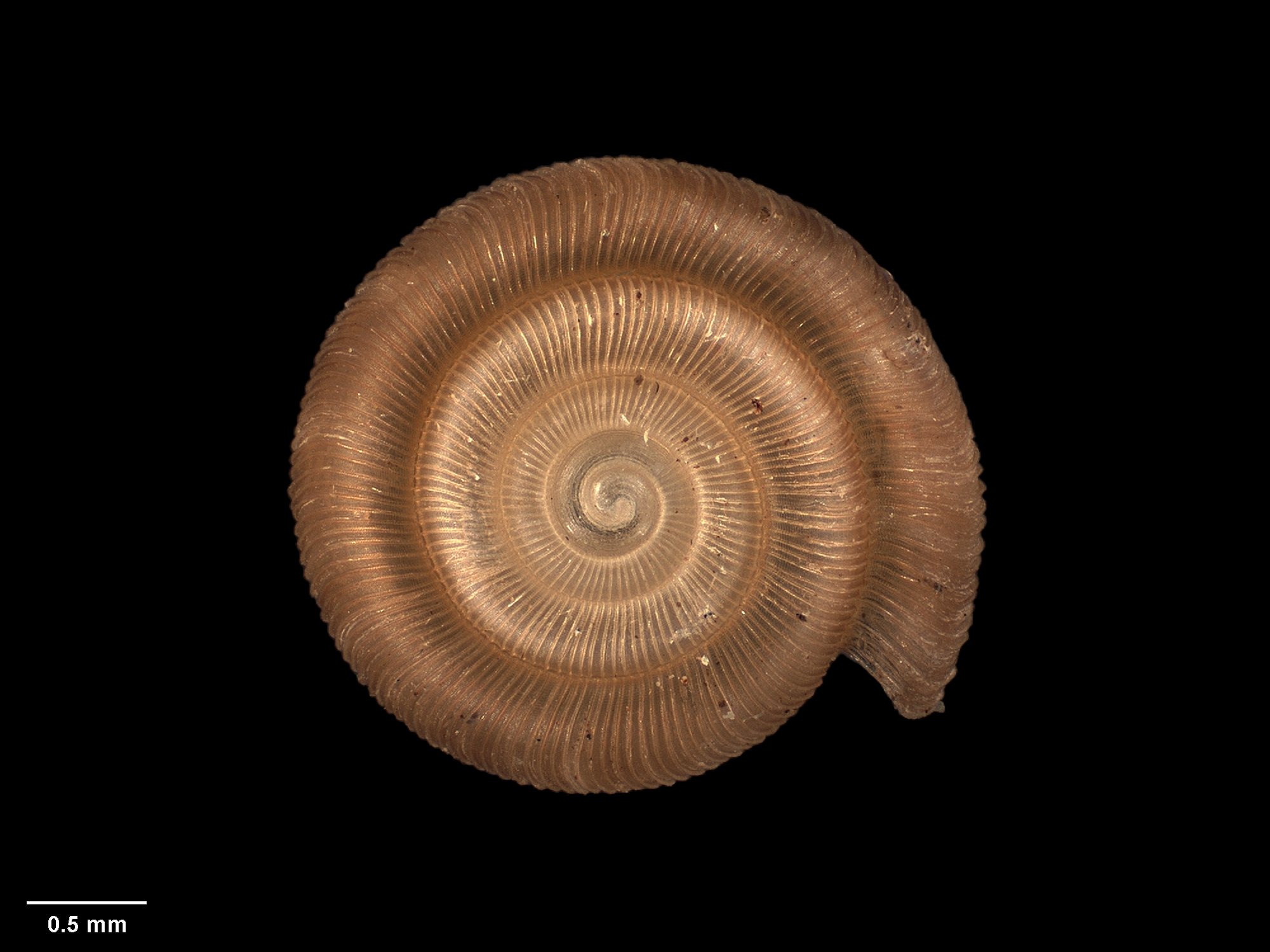
- Holotype from Te Papa

Scientific classification
- Kingdom: Animalia
- Phylum: Mollusca
- Class: Gastropoda
- Order: Stylommatophora
- Superfamily: Punctoidea
- Family: Charopidae
- Genus: Climocella
- Species: C. reinga

Binomial name
- Climocella reinga Goulstone, 1997

Synonyms
- "Mocella" cf. manawatawhia J.F. Goulstone, P.C. Mayhill and G.R. Parrish, 1993

= Climocella reinga =

Species of land snail

Climocella reinga is a species of land snail belonging to the family Charopidae. Endemic to New Zealand, exclusively in upper Northland, near the Aupōuri Peninsula and Kaitaia.

== Description ==
C. reinga has a shell that measures up to 2.9 mm (0.11 in) by 1.5 mm (0.059 in), with a subdiscoidal shell of 4.25 whorls that increase in size. The shell's spire is flat or slightly convex, and the protoconch has 1.75 whorls with the first whorl having six spiral lirae. The shells are uniformly reddish-brown in colour, however preserved specimen shells can become white.

== Taxonomy ==
The species was first described by James Frederick Goulstone in 1996, who named the species after Cape Reinga. Bruce Hazelwood collected the holotype of the species from Tapotupotu near Cape Reinga in Northland, New Zealand on 5 June 1996. The holotype is held by Te Papa, and two paratypes are held by the Auckland War Memorial Museum.

== Distribution and habitat ==
C. reinga is endemic to New Zealand, found on the Aupōuri Peninsula in Northland and the area surrounding Kaitaia, and lives in broadleaf forest and scrubland. Holocene subfossils of the species are prolifically found in sand dunes on the Aupōuri Peninsula. It is the most common land snail found in the Te Paki Ecological Region.

== Gallery ==
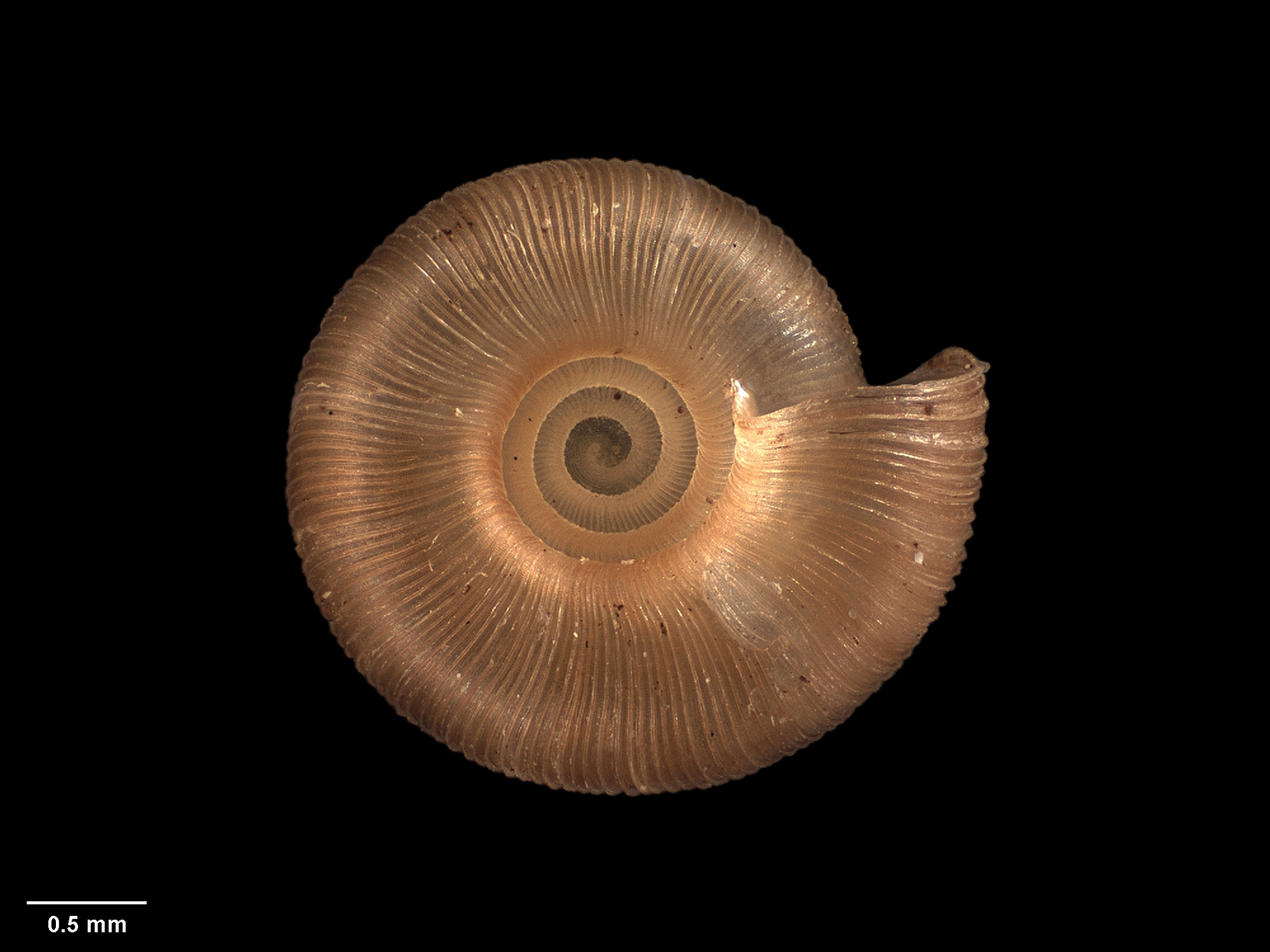
Underside view of holotype

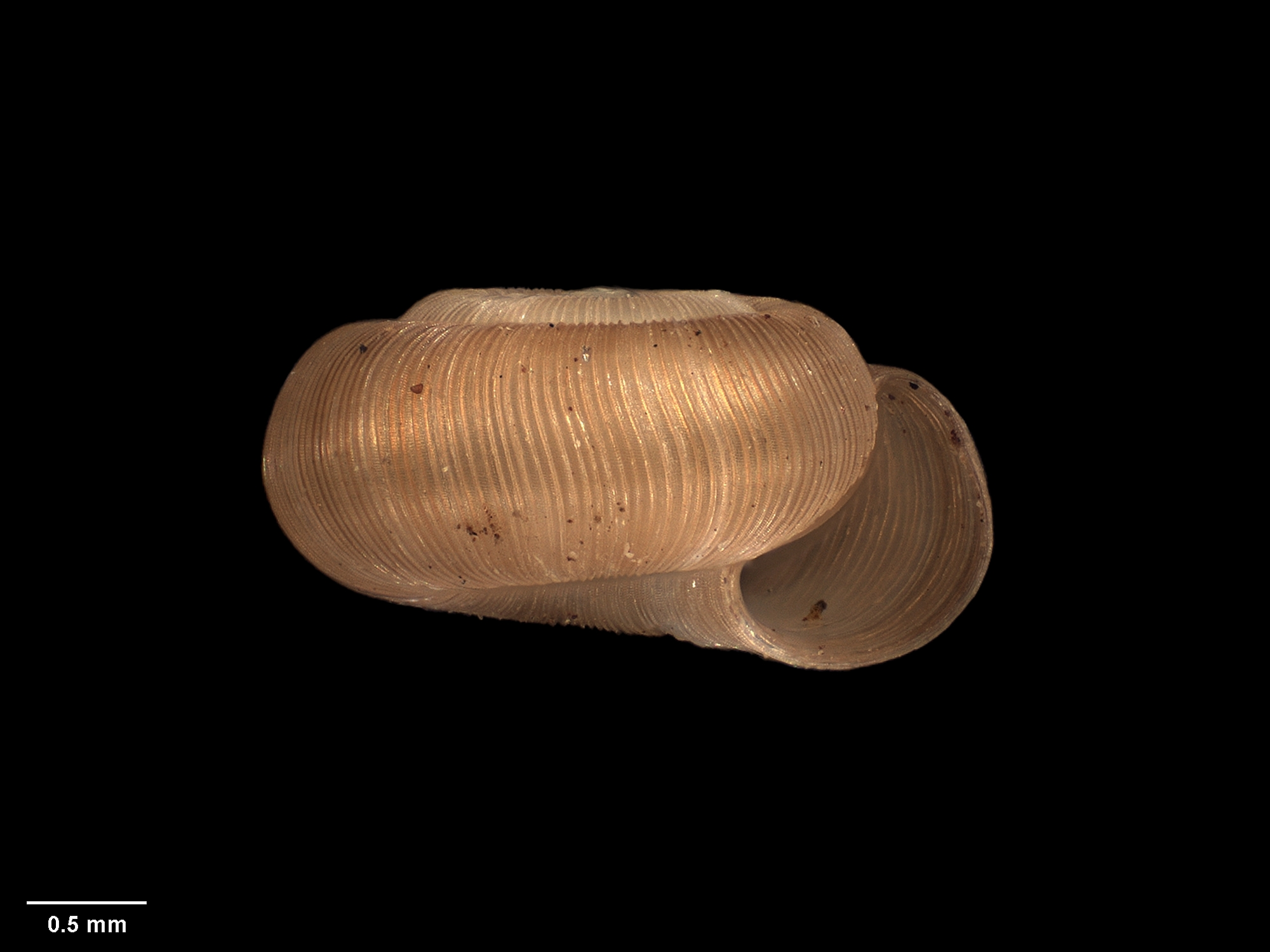
Side view of holotype
