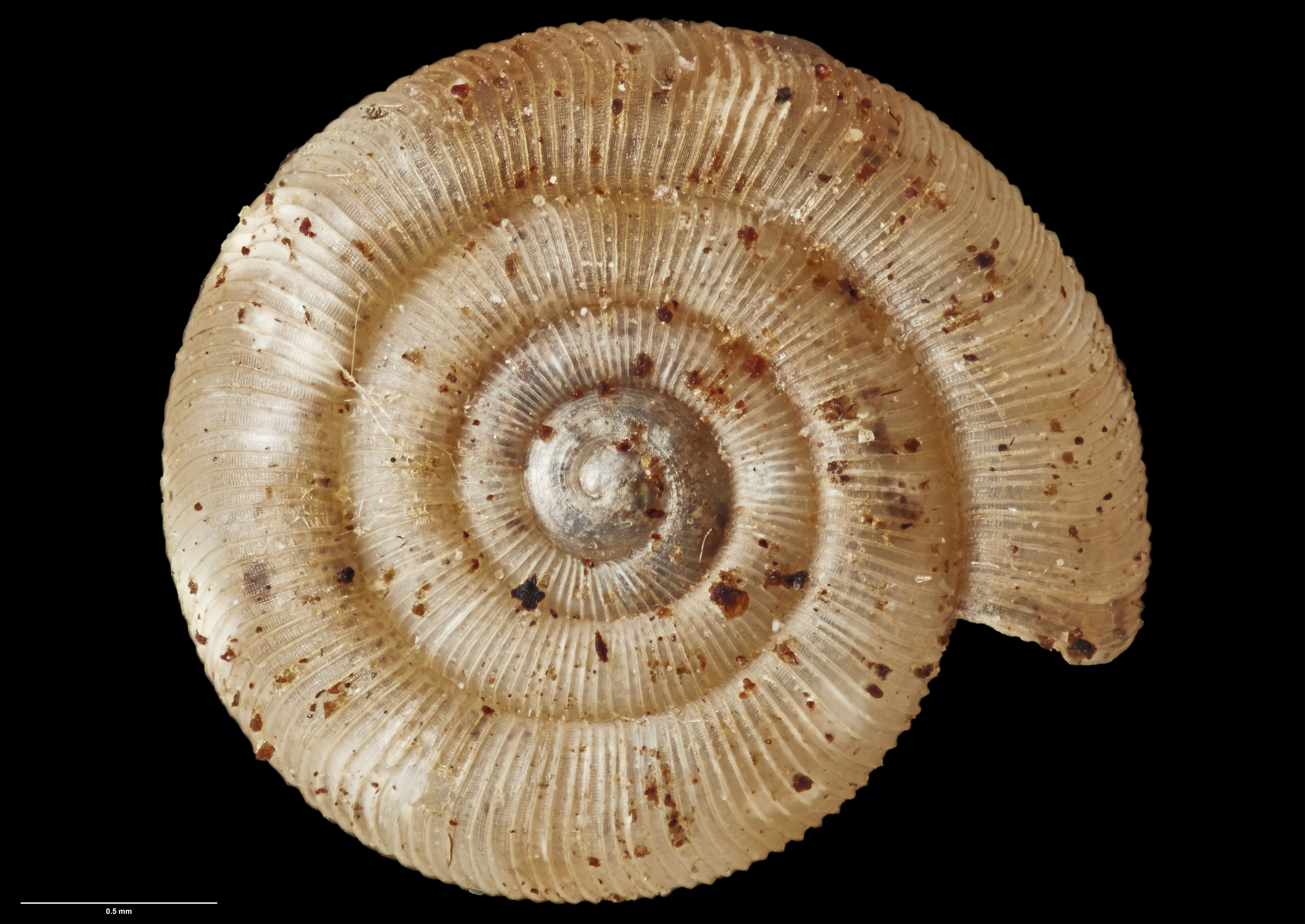
- Holotype of Climocella akarana

Scientific classification
- Kingdom: Animalia
- Phylum: Mollusca
- Class: Gastropoda
- Order: Stylommatophora
- Infraorder: incertae sedis
- Superfamily: Punctoidea
- Family: Charopidae
- Genus: Climocella; Goulstone, 1996

Type species
- Patula maculata

= Climocella =

Genus of gastropods

Climocella is a genus of land snails belonging to the family Charopidae. The genus is endemic to New Zealand

== Description ==
Members of the genus have subdiscoidal shells with four whorls that are up to 3 mm (0.12 in) in size, with flat or slightly convex spires. Climocella has either sharp ribs, or rounded ribs with microscopic spiral lirae, and a protoconch with up to 12 spiral striae. The shells of the species are typically uniformly white, brown, or a reddish-brown pattern of axial bands or blotches on a white or off-white background. The animal is white, and has a prominent epiphallus.

== Taxonomy ==
Climocella was first described by James Frederick Goulstone in 1995, who named Patula corniculum var. maculata (current accepted name Climocella maculata) as the type species. Goulstone named the genus after malacologist Frank Climo. Describing five in the original paper, Climo described ten new species in the genus within the next two years.

== Distribution ==
The genus is endemic to New Zealand.

== Species ==
Species within the genus Climocella include:

- Climocella akarana Goulstone, 1996
- Climocella barkeri Goulstone, 1997
- Climocella cavelliaformis Goulstone, 1996
- Climocella haurakiensis Goulstone, 1996
- Climocella hukutaia Goulstone & Mayhill, 1998
- Climocella intermedia Goulstone, 1997
- Climocella isolata Goulstone, 1997
- Climocella kaitaka Goulstone, 1996
- Climocella kenepuruensis (Suter, 1909)
- Climocella maculata (Suter, 1891)
- Climocella manawatawhia (A. W. B. Powell, 1935)
- Climocella mayhillae Goulstone, 1997
- Climocella prestoni (Sykes, 1895)
- Climocella puhore Goulstone & Mayhill, 1998
- Climocella pukanui Goulstone & Brook, 1999
- Climocella rata Goulstone, 1996
- Climocella reinga Goulstone, 1997
- Climocella runga Goulstone, 1997
- Climocella segregata (Suter, 1894)
- Climocella triticum Goulstone & Mayhill, 1998
- Climocella waenga Goulstone, 1997
