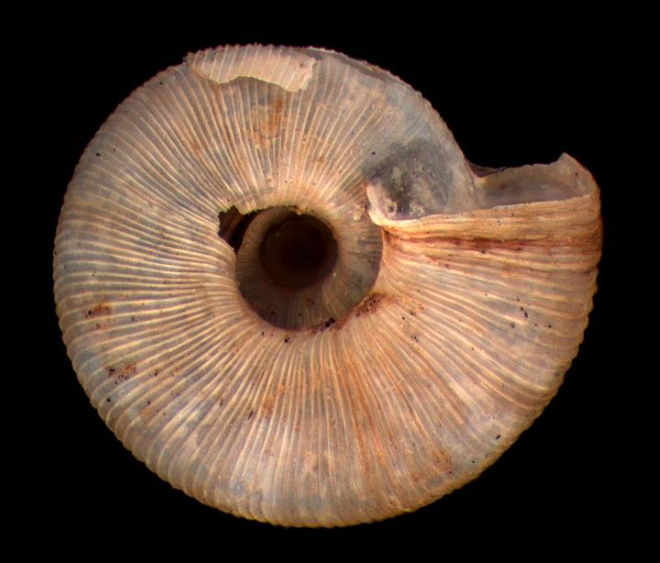
- Shell of Climocella maculata (lectotype at Museum of New Zealand Te Papa Tongarewa)

Scientific classification
- Kingdom: Animalia
- Phylum: Mollusca
- Class: Gastropoda
- Order: Stylommatophora
- Family: Charopidae
- Genus: Climocella
- Species: C. maculata

Binomial name
- Climocella maculata (Suter, 1891)

Synonyms
- Patula corniculum var. maculata Suter, 1891 superseded rank; Patula maculata Suter, 1891

= Climocella maculata =

Species of land snail

Climocella maculata is a species of land snail in the family Charopidae. It can be found in New Zealand.

== Description ==
(Original description by Henry Suter) The shell agrees in almost every respect with the type of the species Patula corniculum (synonym of Mocella eta (L. Pfeiffer, 1853)) but the white epidermis is ornamented with rufous, radiating streaks that occur at very irregular intervals and range from narrow to broad. There are about fifty ribs in one-tenth of an inch (20 per mm), whereas the typical form of the species, according to Hutton, possesses only forty; however, I do not regard this difference as being of much diagnostic value for distinguishing the variety. In my experience, Patula corniculum shows considerable variation in the number of ribs in different localities.

== Distribution ==
This species is endemic to New Zealand and occurs on South Island.
