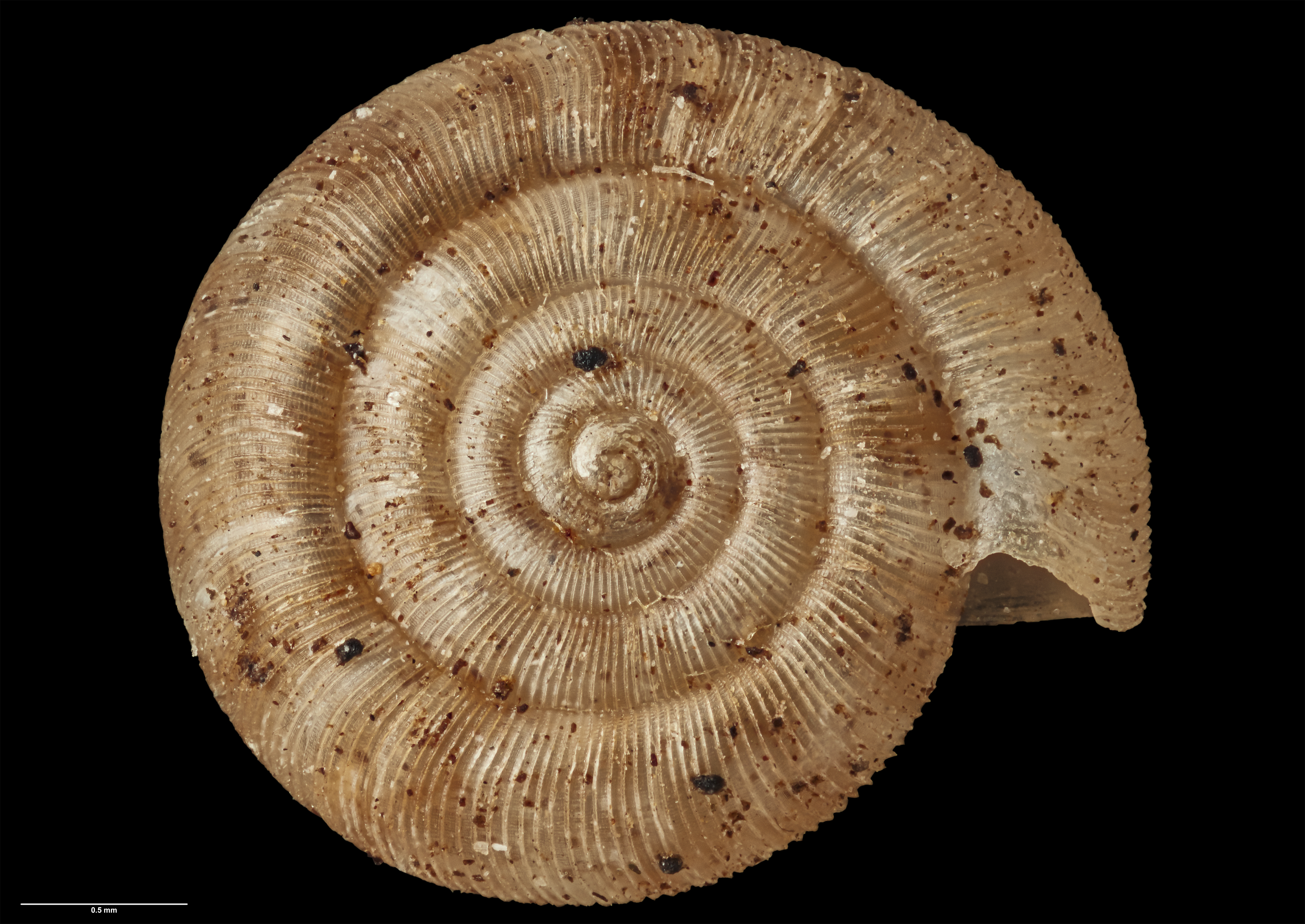
- Holotype from the Auckland War Memorial Museum

Scientific classification
- Kingdom: Animalia
- Phylum: Mollusca
- Class: Gastropoda
- Order: Stylommatophora
- Superfamily: Punctoidea
- Family: Charopidae
- Genus: Climocella
- Species: C. isolata

Binomial name
- Climocella isolata Goulstone, 1997

= Climocella isolata =

Species of land snail

Climocella isolata is a species of land snail belonging to the family Charopidae. Endemic to the Gisborne District of New Zealand, the species is found in areas of grass, sedge, and in association with kahikatea trees.

== Description ==
C. isolata has a shell that measures up to 3.0 mm (0.12 in) by 1.5 mm (0.059 in), with a subdiscoidal shell of 4.25 whorls (final whorl measuring 0.78 mm (0.031 in)). The shell's spire is slightly raised, and the small protoconch has 1.75 whorls with the first whorl having seven spiral lirae. The shells are coloured with indistinct amber-brown radial bands. It can be differentiated from other members of Climocella due to the narrower final whorl found in mature shells.

== Taxonomy ==
The species was first described by James Frederick Goulstone in 1996, who named the species due to its restricted range around the East Cape. G. M. Barker collected the holotype of the species from East Cape Lighthouse Reserve in the Gisborne District, New Zealand on 20 September 1992. The holotpye is held by the Auckland War Memorial Museum.

== Distribution and habitat ==
C. isolata is endemic to New Zealand, known to occur in Gisborne District, including the East Cape Lighthouse Reserve, the Kopuapounamu Valley, Hicks Bay and Ruatoria. The species has been found in grass and sedge, and in association with kahikatea and grass.

== Gallery ==
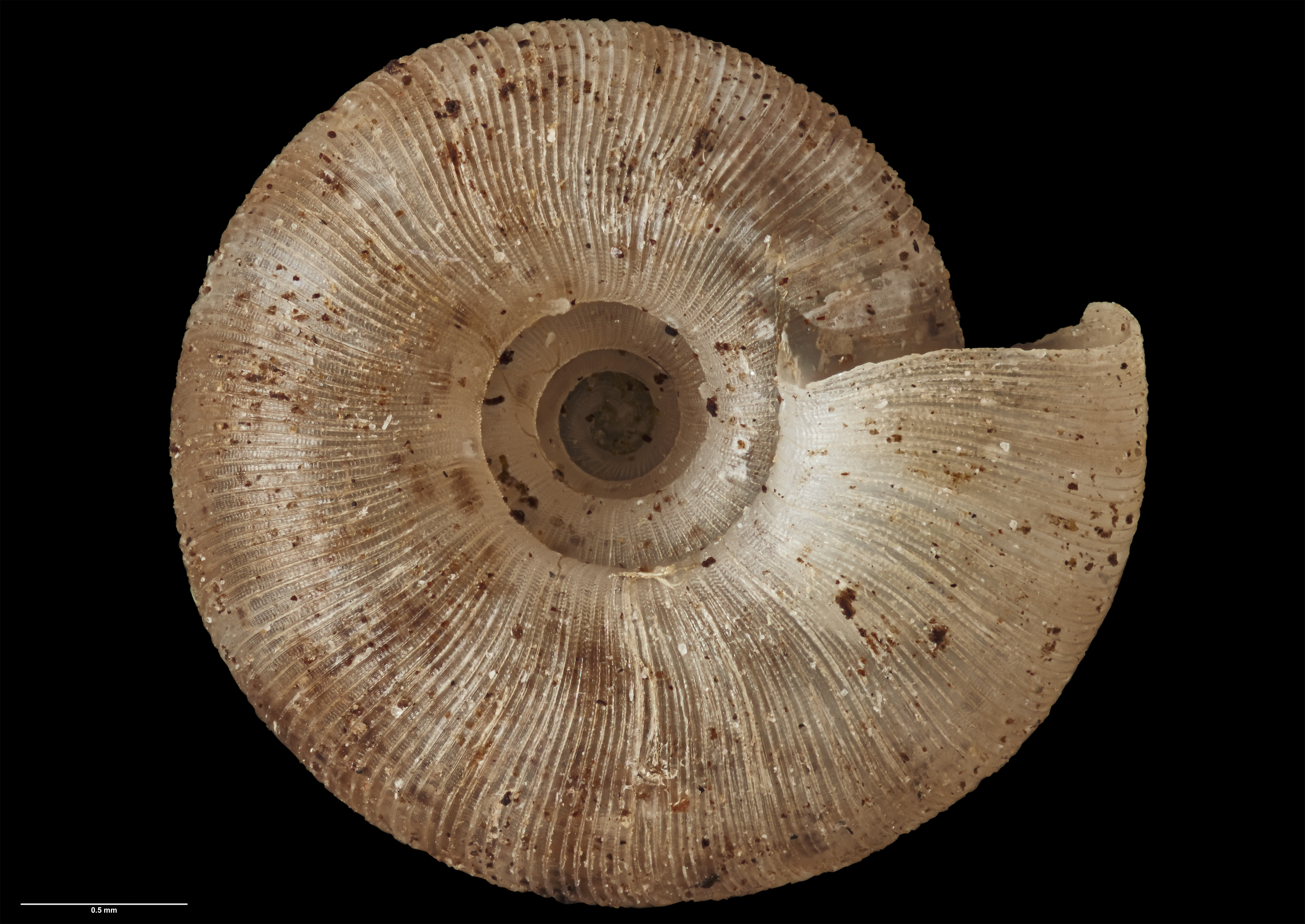
Underside view of holotype

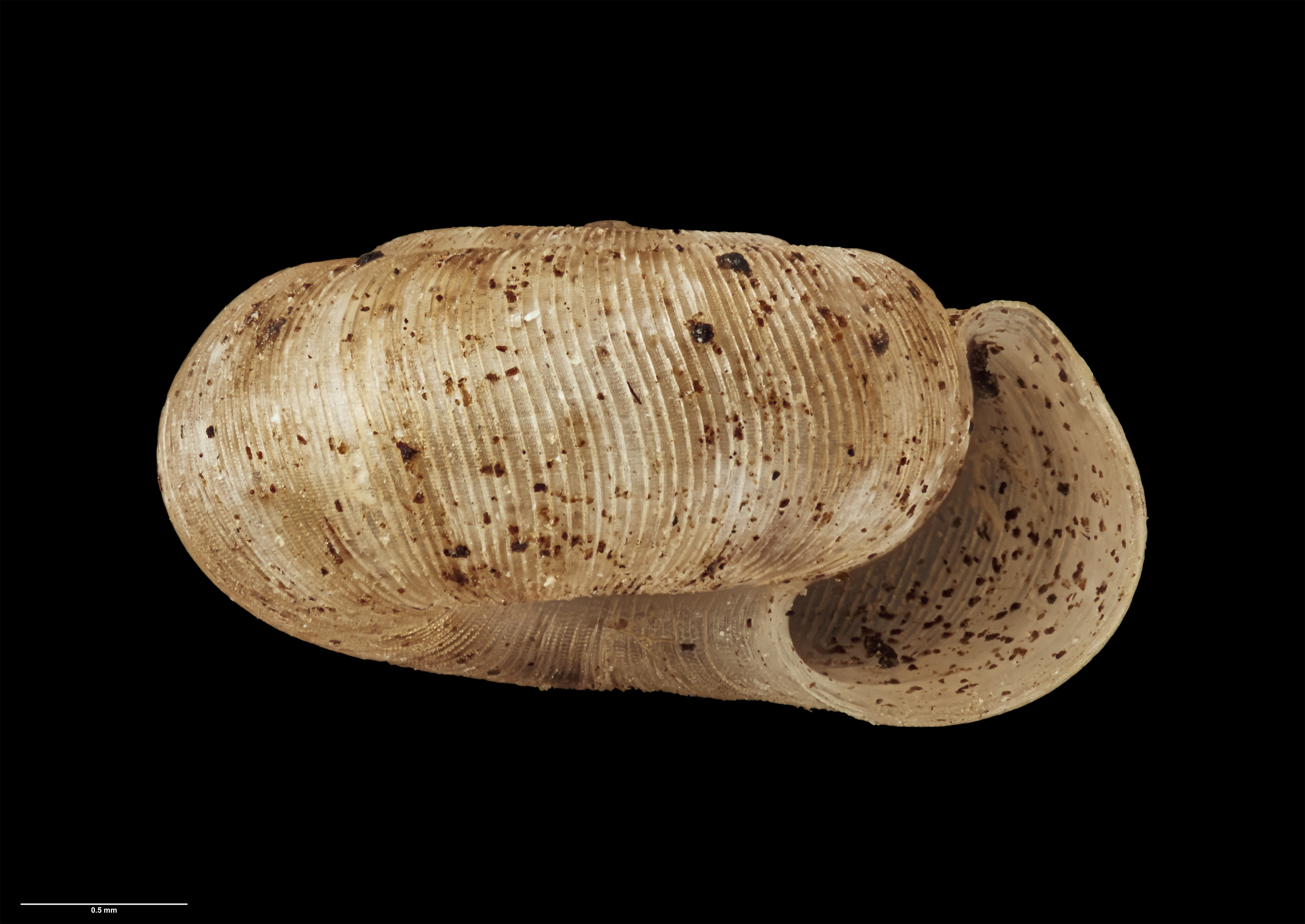
Side view of holotype
