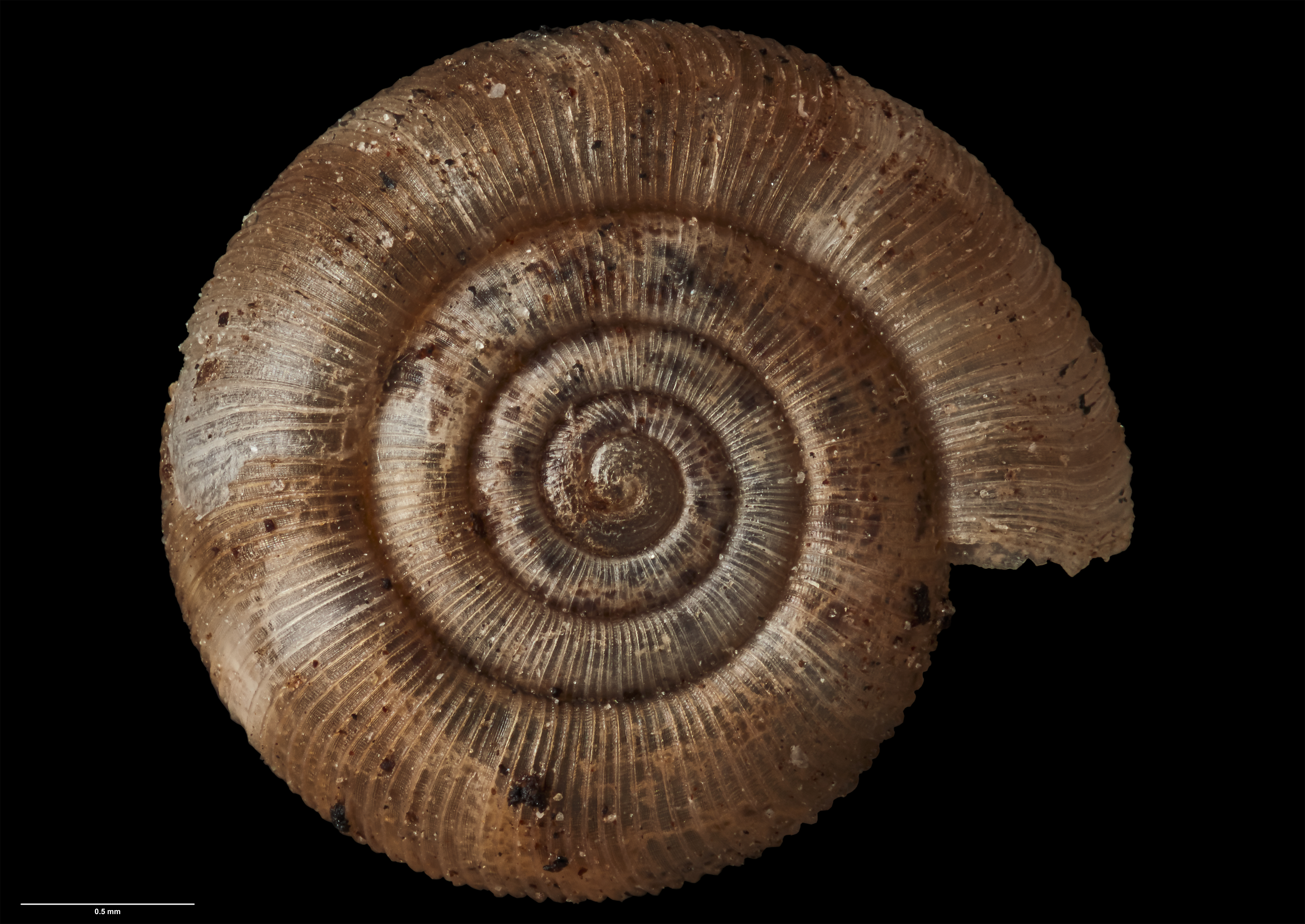
- Holotype from the Auckland War Memorial Museum

Scientific classification
- Kingdom: Animalia
- Phylum: Mollusca
- Class: Gastropoda
- Order: Stylommatophora
- Superfamily: Punctoidea
- Family: Charopidae
- Genus: Climocella
- Species: C. barkeri

Binomial name
- Climocella barkeri Goulstone, 1997

= Climocella barkeri =

Species of land snail

Climocella barkeri is a species of land snail belonging to the family Charopidae. Endemic to New Zealand, the species is found in the eastern Bay of Plenty Region and the Gisborne District, typically living in forested areas.

== Description ==
C. barkeri has a shell that measures up to 2.7 mm (0.11 in) by 1.4 mm (0.055 in), with a subdiscoidal shell of 4.25 whorls (first two narrow, last relatively inflated at 0.8 mm (0.031 in), or a third of the shell's diameter). The shell's spire is flat or slightly raised, and the protoconch has 1.75 whorls with the first whorl having nine spiral lirae. The shells have indistinct sepia-coloured bands.

== Taxonomy ==
The species was first described by James Frederick Goulstone in 1996, who named the species after agricultural scientist Gary Barker. Barker collected the holotype of the species from East Cape Lighthouse Reserve in the Gisborne District, New Zealand on 20 September 1992, which is held by the Auckland War Memorial Museum.

== Distribution and habitat ==
C. barkeri is endemic to New Zealand, found in the eastern Bay of Plenty and the Gisborne District, typically in forested areas between Papatea Bay, East Cape and Anaura Bay. It is also known to occur in scrubby grassland near the East Cape Lighthouse.

== Gallery ==
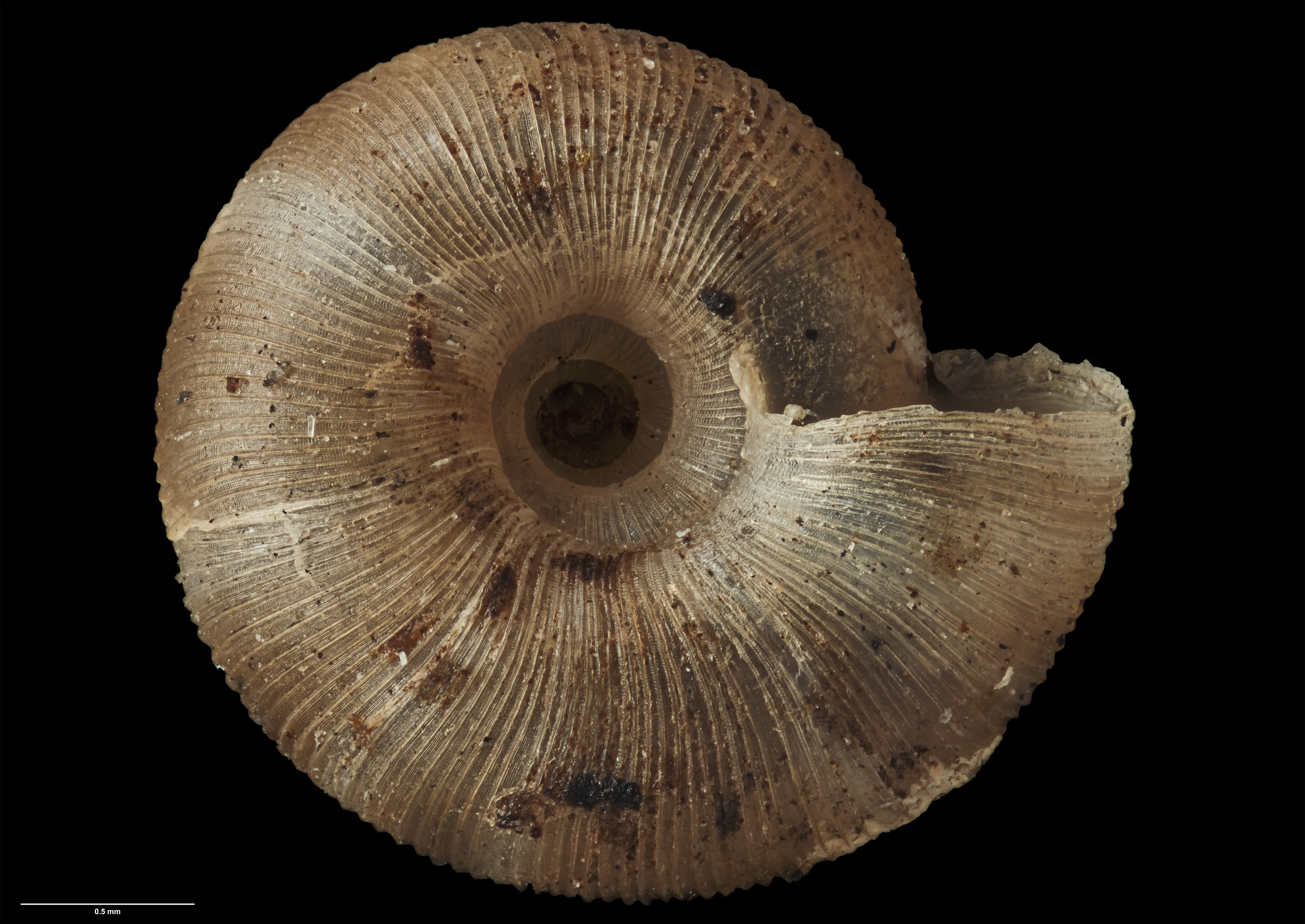
Underside view of holotype

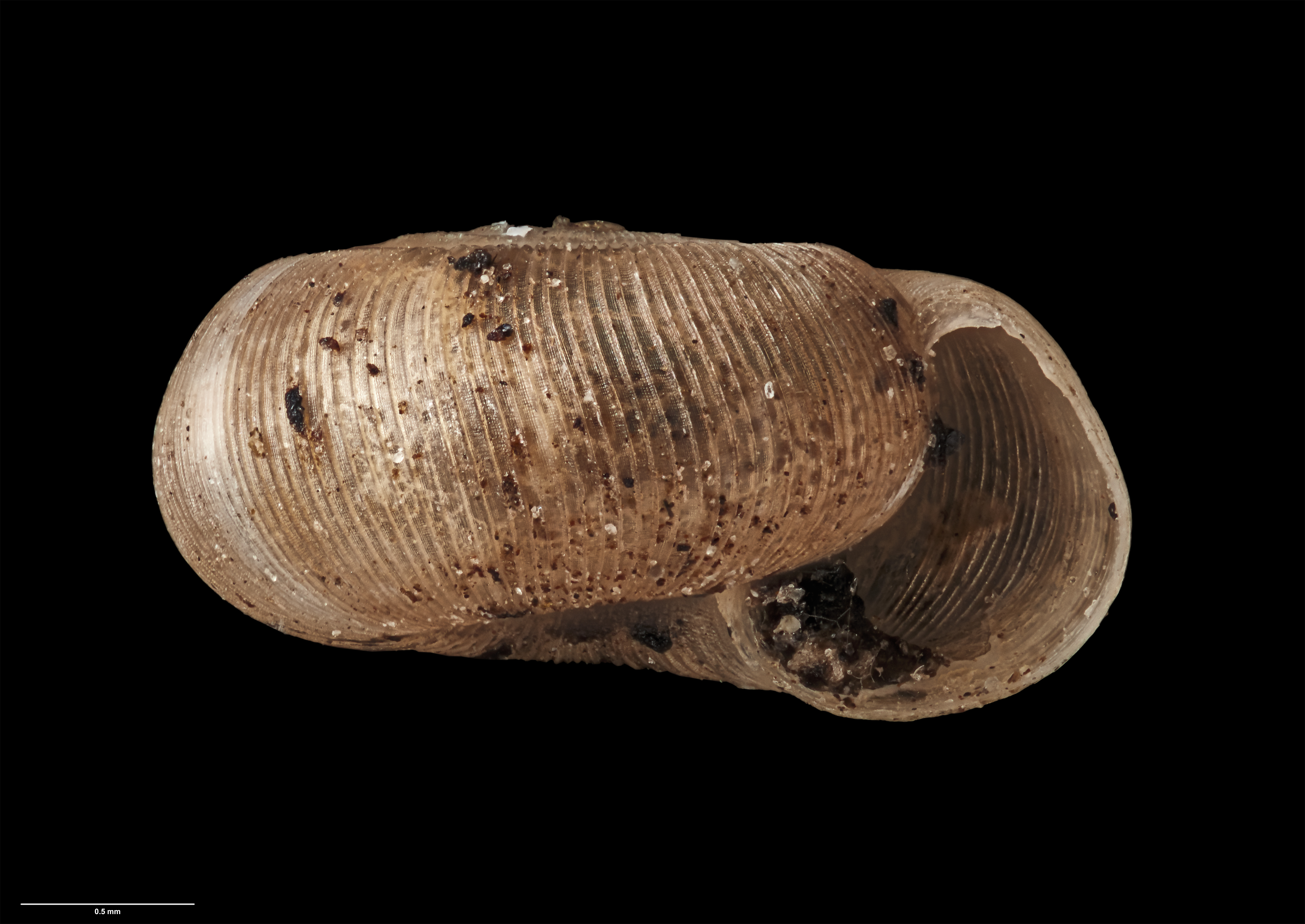
Side view of holotype
