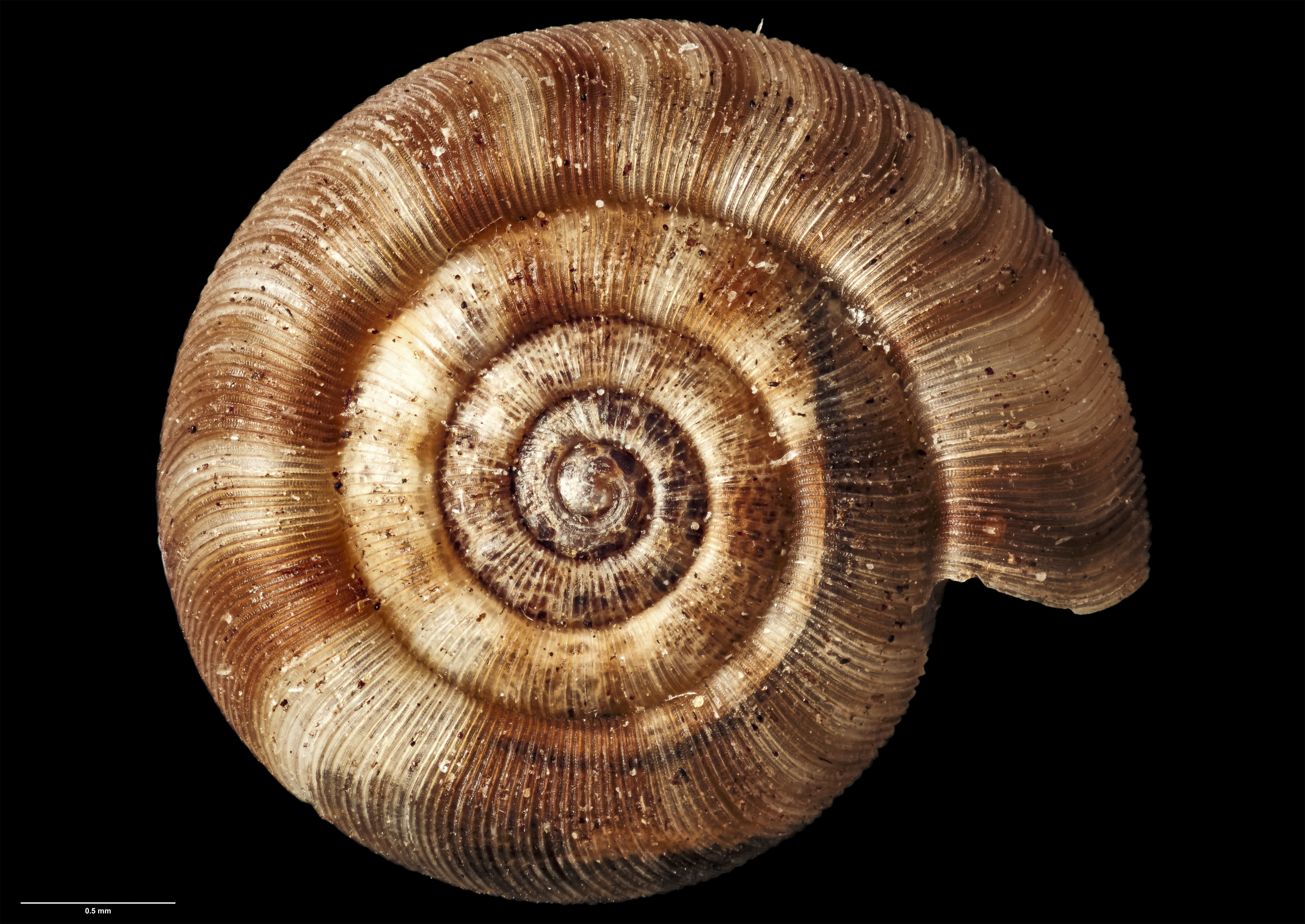
- Holotype from the Auckland War Memorial Museum

Scientific classification
- Kingdom: Animalia
- Phylum: Mollusca
- Class: Gastropoda
- Order: Stylommatophora
- Superfamily: Punctoidea
- Family: Charopidae
- Genus: Climocella
- Species: C. waenga

Binomial name
- Climocella waenga Goulstone, 1997

= Climocella waenga =

Species of land snail

Climocella waenga is a species of land snail belonging to the family Charopidae. Endemic to New Zealand, the species is found in the eastern Bay of Plenty and in the Gisborne District, often in association with rotting tree ferns.

== Description ==
C. waenga has a shell that measures up to 3.1 mm (0.12 in) by 1.6 mm (0.063 in), with a subdiscoidal shell of 4.5 whorls that increase in size. The protoconch has 1.75 whorls with the first whorl having eight spiral lirae. The shells have russet-brown bands.

== Taxonomy ==
The species was first described by James Frederick Goulstone in 1996, who named the species after Waenga, a location near Te Araroa where the holotype was collected from. Pauline C. Mayhill collected the holotype of the species from Waenga in the northern Gisborne District in New Zealand on 1 March 1993. The holotype is held by the Auckland War Memorial Museum.

== Distribution and habitat ==
C. waenga is endemic to New Zealand, known to occur in the coastal areas eastern Bay of Plenty and the Gisborne District, and in Te Urewera forest. It is often found in association with rotting tree ferns.

== Gallery ==
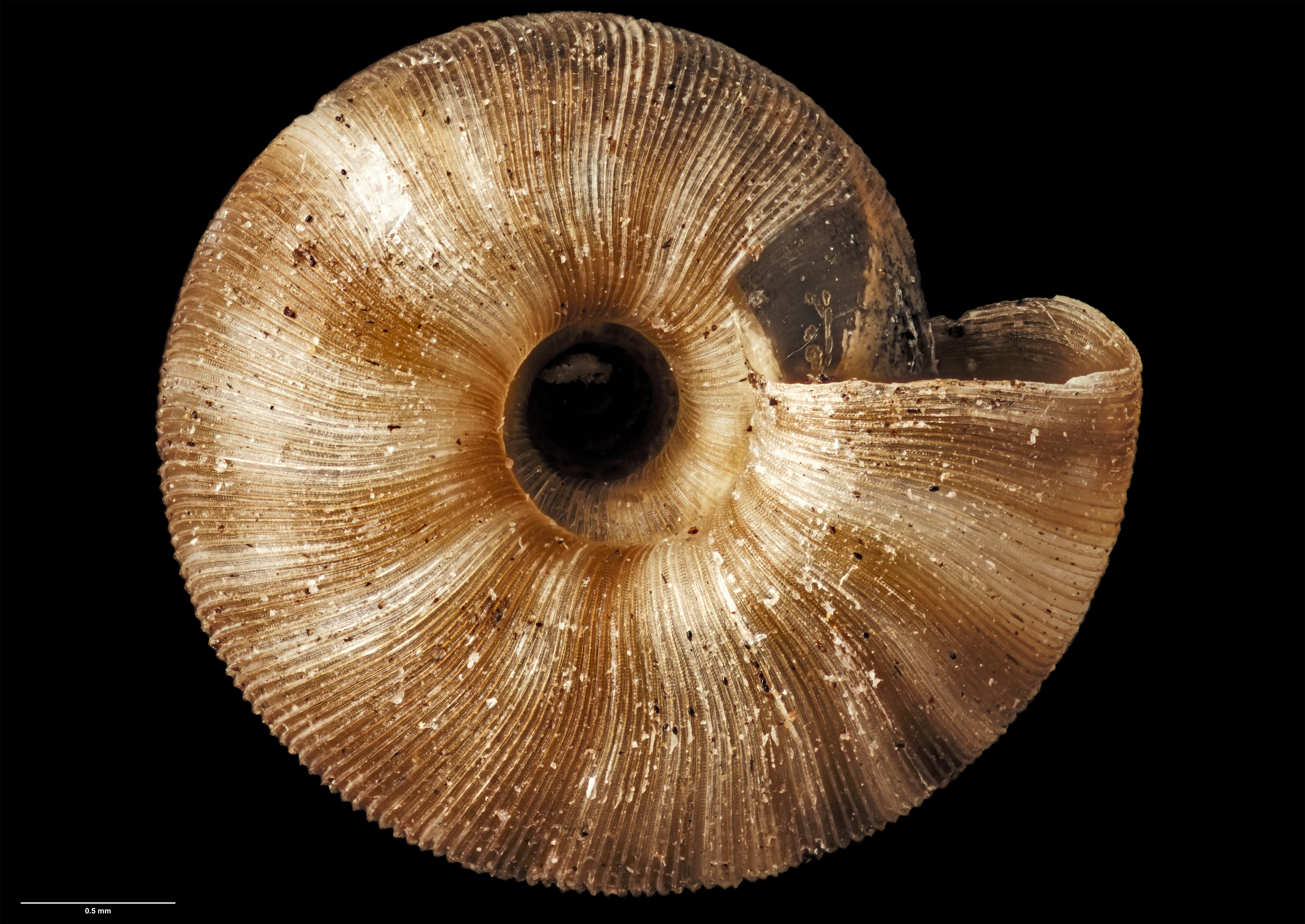
Underside view of holotype

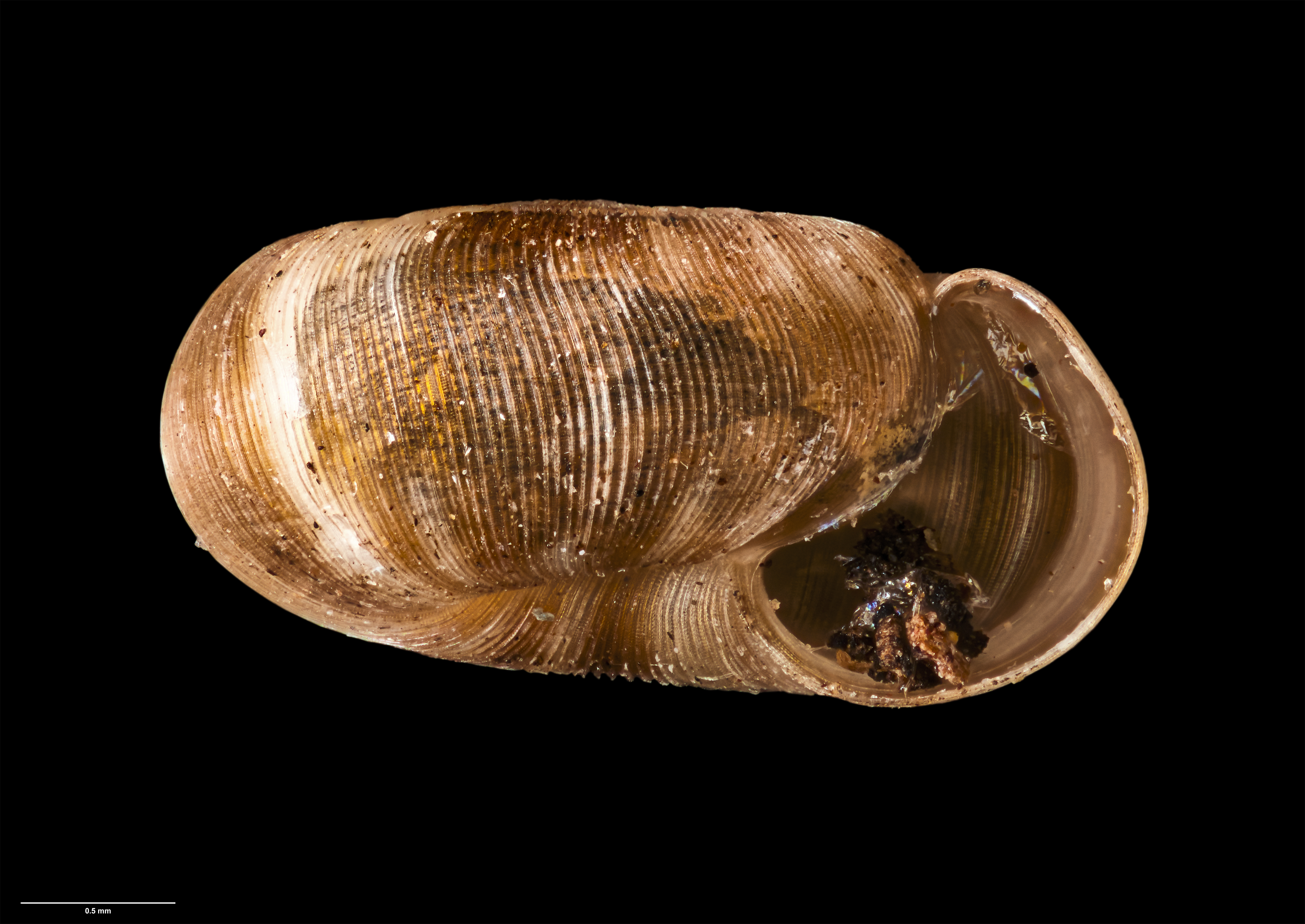
Side view of holotype
