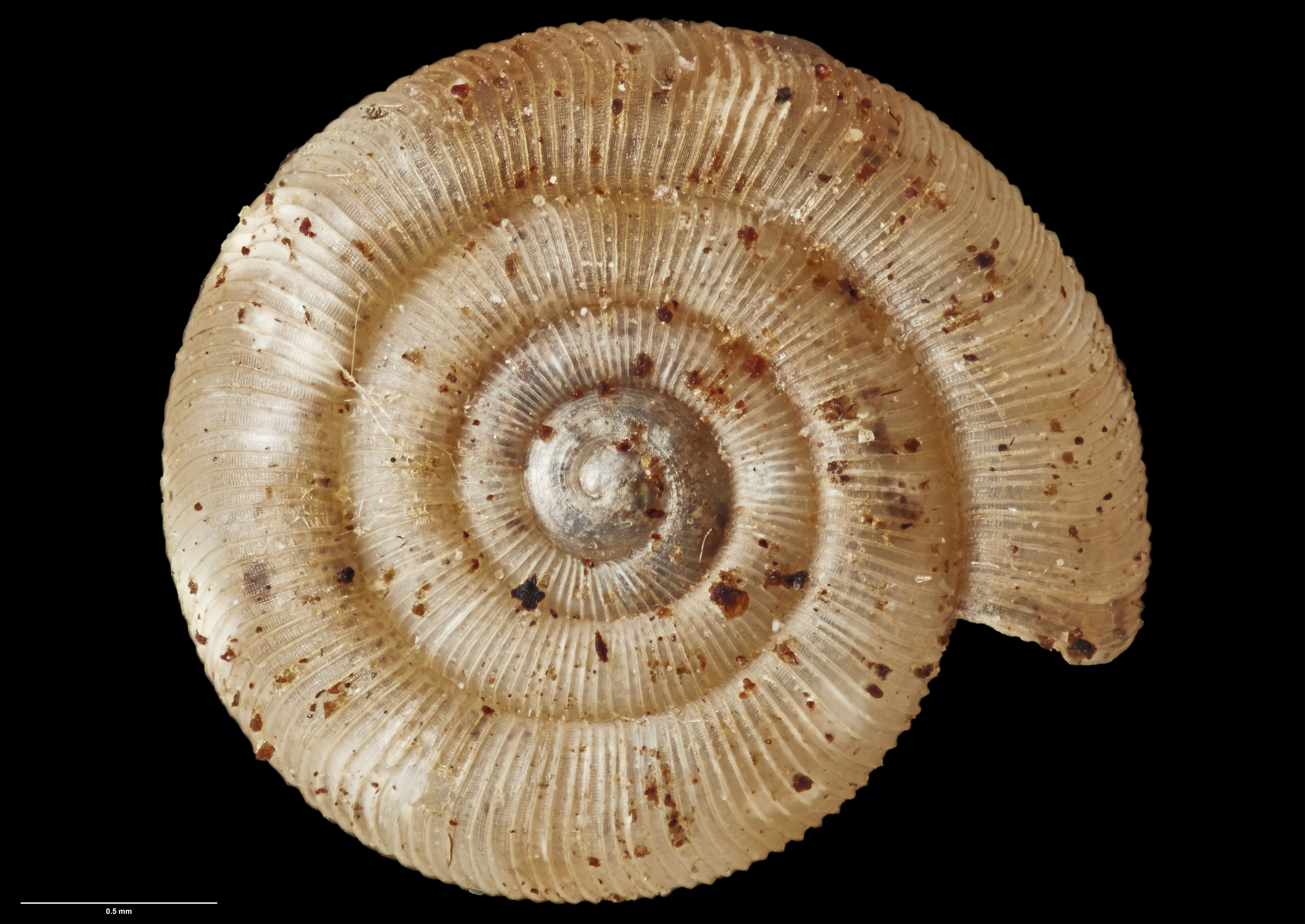
- Holotype

Scientific classification
- Kingdom: Animalia
- Phylum: Mollusca
- Class: Gastropoda
- Order: Stylommatophora
- Superfamily: Punctoidea
- Family: Charopidae
- Genus: Climocella
- Species: C. akarana

Binomial name
- Climocella akarana Goulstone, 1996

Synonyms
- Charopa (Mocella) eta Climo 1970 (in part); "Mocella" n. sp. aff. maculata Solem, Climo & Roscoe 1981; "Mocella" sp. 3 Goulstone 1983

= Climocella akarana =

Species of land snail

Climocella akarana is a species of land snail belonging to the family Charopidae. Endemic to New Zealand, the species is found in the upper North Island, often in association with decomposing logs.

== Description ==
C. akarana has a shell that measures 2.8 mm (0.11 in) by 1.5 mm (0.059 in), which has up to four subdiscoidal whorls and has a spire that is typically slightly raised. The shells have a protoconch of 1.5 whorls, and 9-10 spiral lirae which are crowded near the centre. The species can vary in appearance based on location, such as specimens collected from Rangitoto which have bright colour markings.

== Taxonomy ==
The species was first described by James Frederick Goulstone in 1995, naming the species after the Māori language name for Auckland. Goulstone collected the holotype of the species from Ngaheretuku Reserve near Clevedon on 1 October 1985, which is held by the Auckland War Memorial Museum. In 1996, Goulstone described seven new species of Climocella, many of which included specimens that had previously been identified as C. akarana.

== Distribution and habitat ==
C. akarana is endemic to New Zealand, found on the North Island northwards from Taranaki north, on Great Mercury Island and the Hauraki Gulf islands. The species is the most common member of Climocella found in Auckland. The species is typically found in association with decomposing logs, however specimens found on Rangitoto and in the crater of Māngere Mountain live in exposed dry scoria rocks.

== Gallery ==
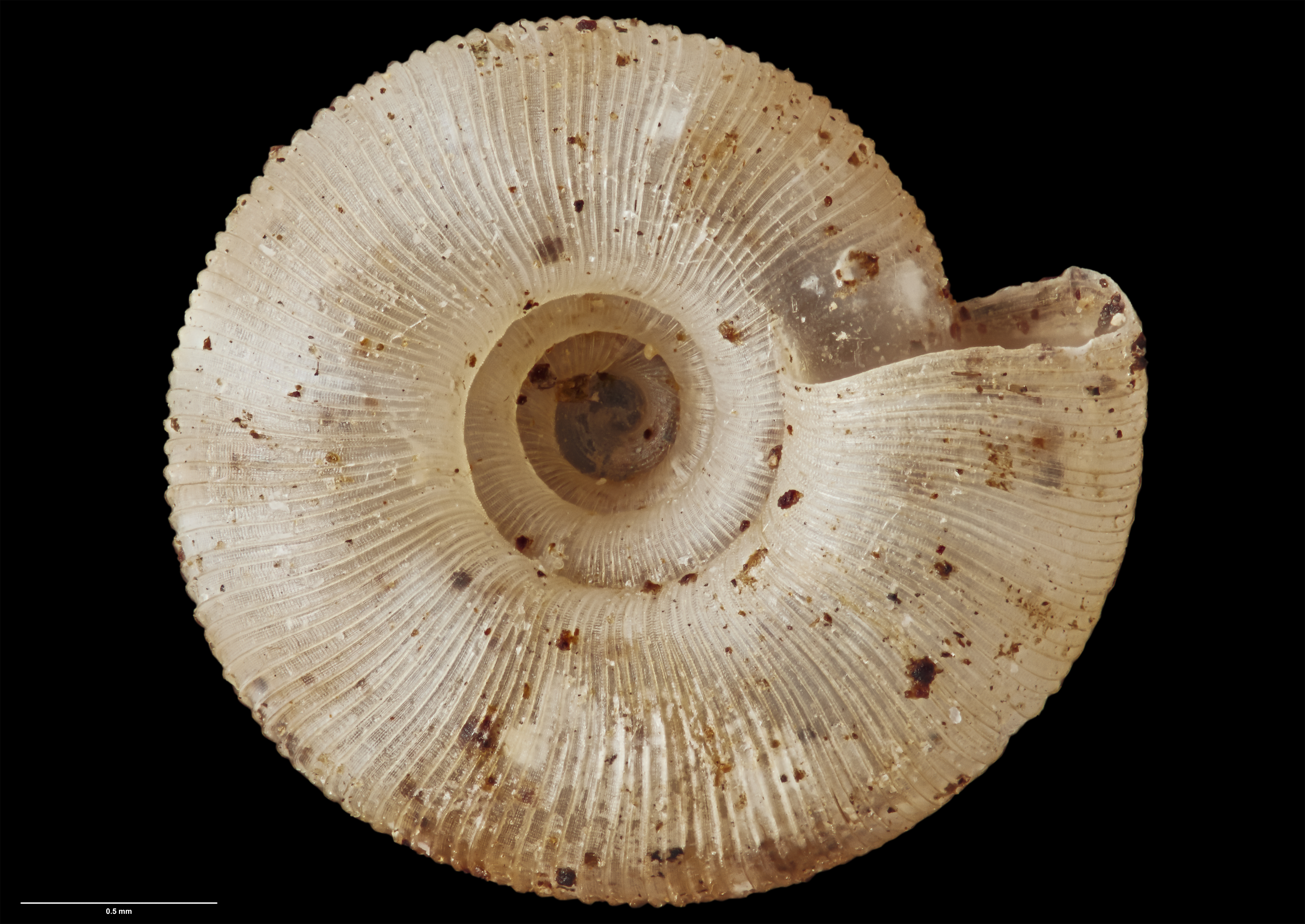
Underside view of holotype

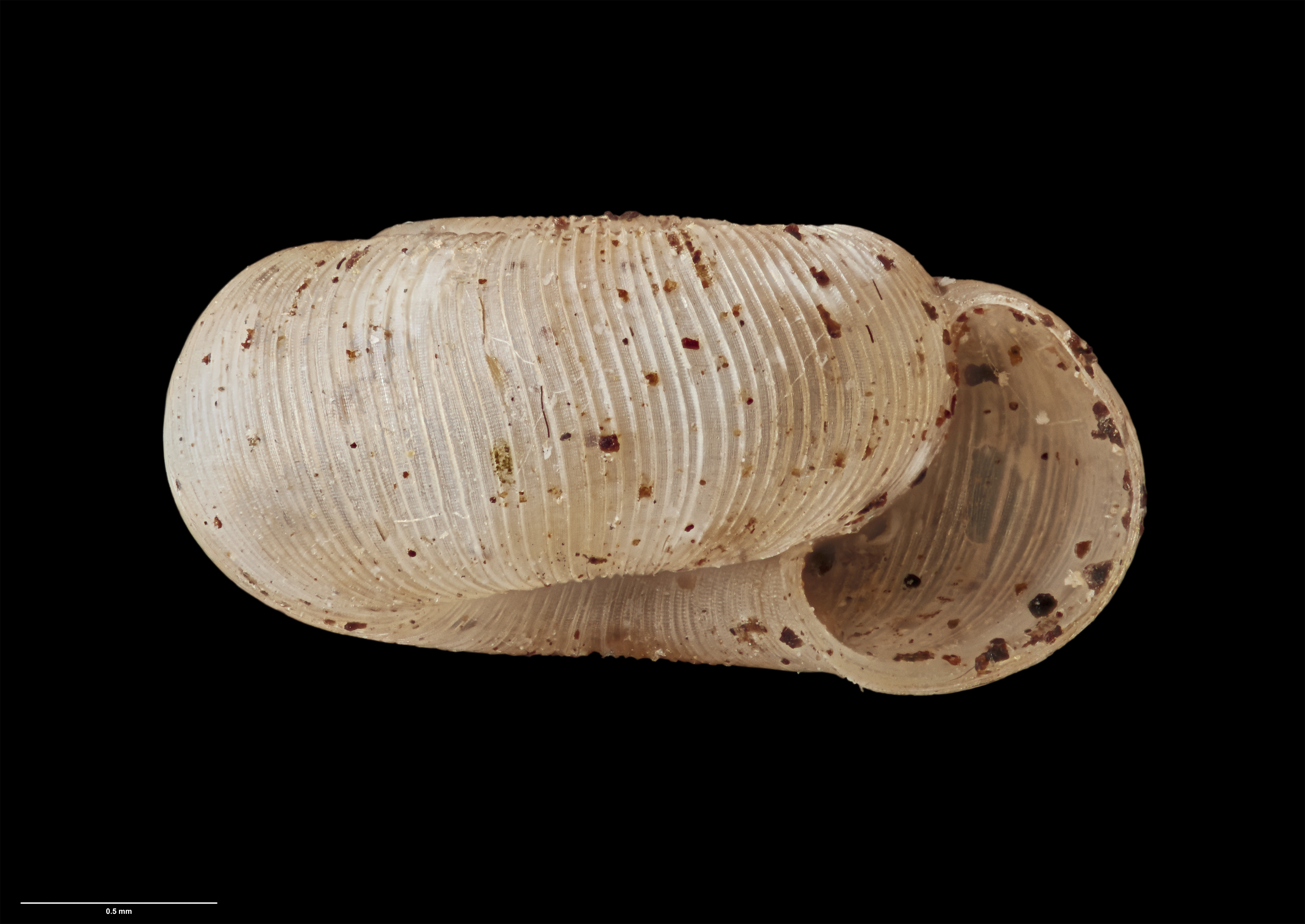
Side view of holotype
