= Arapera Blank =

New Zealand poet and writer (1932–2002)

- Born: Arapera Hineira Kaa; 7 June 1932
- Died: 30 July 2002 (aged 70)
- Education: University of Auckland
- Occupations: Poet; short-story writer; teacher
- Spouse: Pius Blank (m. 1958)
- Children: 2
- Relatives: Keri Kaa (sister); Hone Kaa (brother); Wi Kuki Kaa (brother)
- Writing career
- Language: Māori and English
- Notable awards: Katherine Mansfield Memorial Award (1959)

Arapera Hineira Blank (née Kaa; 7 June 1932 – 30 July 2002) was a New Zealand poet, short-story writer and teacher. She wrote in both te reo Māori and English, and was one of the first Māori writers to be published in English. Her work focussed on aspects of Māori life and the life of women. In 1959 she was awarded a special Katherine Mansfield Memorial Award for a bilingual essay. In 1986 she published a collection of poetry, and after her death her son published a further collection of her writing in 2015.

== Early life and family ==
Blank was born in Rangitukia on New Zealand's East Cape on 7 June 1932. She was affiliated with the iwi (tribes) of Ngāti Porou, Ngāti Kahungungu, Rongowhakaata and Te Aitanga-a-Māhaki. Her father was the Reverend Tipi Whenua Kaa, from Rangitukia, who was vicar of the Waiapu parish and her mother Hohipene Kaa (formerly Whaanga) was from Wairoa. Blank was one of 12 children: her siblings include the writer and te reo advocate Keri Kaa, Anglican church leader and child welfare advocate Hone Kaa, and actor Wi Kuki Kaa.

She married Swiss-born Pius Blank at St John’s Church, Rangitukia, in 1958. They had two children, Marino and Anton.

== Career ==
Blank was educated at Queen Victoria School for Māori Girls and studied anthropology at the University of Auckland. She was a teacher for 25 years, including teaching te reo Māori and social studies at Glenfield College and Auckland Girls' Grammar School; her pupils knew her as "Ma Blank".

Blank was one of a small group of Māori writers writing in English during the 1950s, and one of New Zealand's first bilingual poets. Her short stories often dealt with aspects of Māori life and culture. She was a member of the Maori Artists and Writers Society. She said of her two languages:

I enjoy words that sparkle, whether they be in Māori, my mother tongue, or English. What a privilege it is to inherit and to appreciate a language, and to enjoy another equally.

In 1959 Blank was awarded a special Katherine Mansfield Memorial Award for her essay Ko Taku Kumara Hei Wai-u Mo Tama which had been published the previous year in Te Ao Hou / The New World. In 1970 she featured in Margaret Orbell's anthology Contemporary Māori Writing. In 1986 her poetry collection Nga Kokako Huataratara: The Notched Plumes of the Kokako was published, and she had poems and short stories published in Witi Ihimaera's bilingual anthology Te Ao Marama: Contemporary Māori Writing in the 1990s. Barbara Brookes, author of A History of New Zealand Women (2016), describes Blank's work as offering "insights into Māori culture, feminism, and the dual Māori-Pakeha world she lived in".

== Legacy ==
On her death in 2002, Ihimaera described her as one of three women he considered his elders in the Māori writing tradition, together with Kāterina Mataira and Jacquie Sturm, and said "the whaia, the mother of the Maori writing tradition as we today practise it in that lowlier language called English, has died". In 2015, her son Anton published a collection of her short stories, poems and essays, accompanied by photos taken by her husband, under the title For Someone I Love. The collection was edited by Anton and her daughter Marino. A review in Landfall said Blank "is very well-served by this loving compilation and she should be accorded much more attribution in Aotearoa literary circles". Tina Makereti for the New Zealand Review of Books noted her "ability to fluently engage two different world views via language" and that the collection is also of historical interest as an insight into the years between 1958 and 1990.
