= Kura Te Waru Rewiri =

New Zealand painter

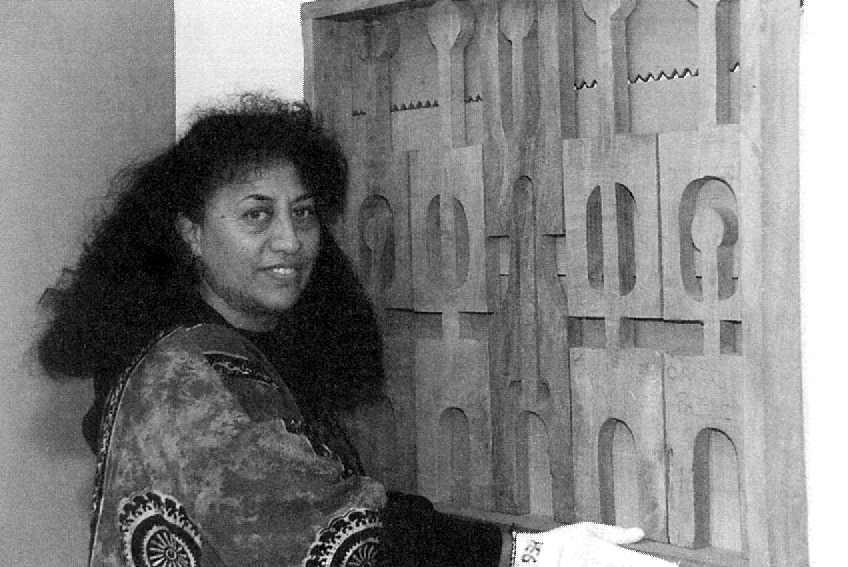
- Te Waru Rewiri in 1996
- Born: 1950 (age 75–76); Kaeo, New Zealand
- Education: Ilam School of Fine Arts
- Known for: Painting

Kura Te Waru Rewiri (born 1950) is a New Zealand artist, academic and educator. Art historian Deidre Brown described her as "one of Aotearoa, New Zealand's most celebrated Māori women artists."

== Early life and education ==
Te Waru Rewiri is the eldest of nine children. She was born in 1950 in Kaeo in the far north of New Zealand to Sam and Geneva Davis. She is of Ngāti Kahu, Ngāpuhi, Ngāti Kauwhata, Ngāti Rangi descent.

Te Waru Rewiri attended Northland College where she was taught by Selwyn Wilson. She then attended Bay of Islands College and was taught by Buck Nin who encouraged her to study at Ilam School of Fine Arts in Christchurch.

During her time at Ilam she was tutored by Don Peebles and Bill Sutton and graduated in 1973 with a Diploma in Fine Art (Honours) majoring in painting. Whilst at the University of Canterbury Te Waru Rewiri, alongside Eruera Nia and Tame Iti became involved in Ngā Tamatoa (Tuatoru) Christchurch chapter. Her honours year was supervised by Rudi Gopas and her thesis focused on pre-European Māori art, specifically stone tool carving. Te Waru Rewiri states:

At the time it was restricting for Māori women to research carving because of the restriction of [it] being a male-only area. Today we are informed by Tohunga Whakairo that women have always carved. As Māori women we have to redefine our past so that we know where we stand now.

In 1974 Te Waru Rewiri completed study to be a secondary teacher at Christchurch Training College. From 1974 to 1984, Te Waru Rewiri taught in secondary schools across the North Island until she decided to paint full-time.

Te Waru Rewiri was the first graduate of the Master of Māori Visual Arts from Toioho ki Āpiti, the Māori visual arts degree programme at Massey university.

== Career ==
Te Waru Rewiri has exhibited extensively in New Zealand and internationally since 1985. Her work is held in both private and public collections such as the Auckland Art Gallery and Te Papa Tongarewa. Te Waru Rewiri creates contemporary art and draws upon traditional Māori art, she uses Māori images in her work such as kowhaiwhai patterns, weaving and tā moko. She worked on the Te Māori exhibition when it came back to New Zealand in 1986.

During the mid-1980s Te Waru Rewiri and her contemporaries such as Shona Rapira Davies, Robyn Kahukiwa and Emily Karaka gave voice to the concerns surrounding Māori women's sovereignty. Megan Tamati-Quennell writes, "The space Te Waru Rewiri and her contemporaries occupied was really that of mana wāhine Māori".

As a lecturer and teacher at a tertiary education level Te Waru Rewiri has taught at Whanganui Polytechnic and in 1993 she became the first Māori women to teach at Elam School of Fine Arts. From 1996 to 2004 Te Waru Rewiri lectured at Toioho ki Āpiti on the Māori Visual Arts degree at Massey University's Palmerston North Campus alongside Robert Jahnke, Rachael Rakena and Shane Cotton. Te Waru Rewiri is co-editor of the 2023 book Ki Mua, Ki Muri marking 25 years of Toiohi ki Āpiti.

A recurring image seen in Te Waru Rewiri's works is the cross, which carries many different meanings depending on its context and treatment. Her art work Te Rīpeka (Crucifixion) (1985), is about the 19th century censorship of Māori carving by the church. Influenced by the Ratana religious and political movement, her expressive paintings explore the effects of colonisation and portray the significance of taonga Māori. As curator Nigel Borell writes, "Kura Te Waru Rewiri's painting practice has forged new ways to understand and appreciate the scope of contemporary painting informed by Māori realities, beliefs and paradigms."

A lithograph by Te Waru Rewiri called Mask V is held in the collections of the Christchurch Art Gallery. In 2012 Mangere Arts Centre Ngā Tohu o Uenuku held a survey exhibition of Te Waru Rewiri's work curated by Nigel Borell. The accompanying publication KURA: Story of a Māori Women Artist include essays by prominent Māori curators, Megan Tamati-Quennell, Ngahiraka Mason and Dr Deidre Brown. In 2014 Te Waru Rewiri's work featured in Five Māori Painters a major exhibition held at Auckland Art Gallery.

Te Waru-Rewiri is one of the few women who have led a wharenui (Māori meeting house) project with Te Puna o Te Matauranga (The Spring of Knowledge) on NorthTec's Raumanga campus that opened in 2015. It is a contemporary marae and the wharenui features artworks by Te Waru-Rewiri, Lorraine King, Michael Rewiri-Thorsen, Te Warihi Hetaraka, James Te Kuiti Stewart, Te Hemo Ata Henare and others.

In 2019 Te Waru Rewiri was recognised with a Te Waka Toi award, 'Te Tohu o Te Papa Tongarewa Rongomaraeroa | Outstanding contribution to Ngā Toi Māori'.

Te Waru Rewiri is currently a senior tutor in Maunga Kura Toi a Bachelor of Māori Art at Northtec Tai Tokerau Wānanga. Te Waru Rewiri is also a board member of Te Waka Toi, the Māori arts board of Creative New Zealand.

== Publications ==
- Barnett, Cassandra; Kura Te Waru Rewiri, eds. (2023). Ki Mua, Ki Muri: 25 years of Toiohi ki Āpiti. Massey University Press. ISBN 978-1-9911511-5-5. OL 51039360M. Wikidata Q124338800.
