= Emily Karaka =

New Zealand artist

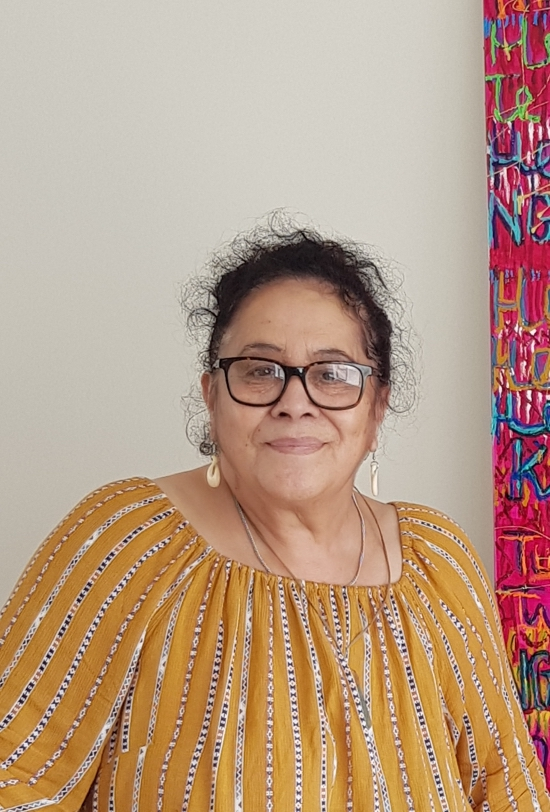
- Karaka in 2021
- Born: 1952 (age 73–74); Auckland
- Known for: Painting
- Style: Abstract expressionism

Emily Karaka (born Auckland in 1952), also known as Emare Karaka, is a New Zealand artist of Māori (Ngāti Tai ki Tāmaki, Ngati Hine, Ngāpuhi) descent Her work is recognised for "its expressive intensity, her use of high key colour, and her gritty address of political issues related to Māori land rights and the Treaty of Waitangi".

== Early and personal life ==
Karaka grew up in Glen Innes in Auckland in a family of five siblings. Her brother Dilworth Karaka was in the New Zealand band Herbs. Karaka herself brought her family up in Glen Innes and lives there still.

== Career ==
A largely self-taught artist, Karaka credits many figures in New Zealand art as mentors, including Greer Twiss, Colin McCahon, Gretchen Albrecht, Tony Fomison, Arnold Manaaki Wilson, Philip Clairmont and Allan Maddox. In a 2014 interview she said:

Greer Twiss was my teacher at intermediate school, and I met Colin McCahon at Greer's house when I was 12. They became my kaitiaki. They steered me away from Tamaki College because they didn't consider the arts curriculum there was sufficient, and steered me to Auckland Girls' Grammar. That was great because I had people like Liz Mountain [Elizabeth Ellis]. She'd just come out of training school so she had a lot of energy and the commitment to keep to your cultural landscape and develop it.

Karaka is seen as part of the first generation of contemporary Māori artists and she is often placed alongside painters Robyn Kahukiwa and Kura Te Waru Rewiri in discussions of New Zealand art history. She acknowledges Katarina Mataira, Selwyn Muru and Arnold Wilson as kaumātua (respected elders) who paved the way for the next generation of Māori artists.

== Recent exhibitions ==
Rāhui, 29 April - 4 June 2021. Visions Gallery, Auckland.

Two Artists: Emily Karaka & Shona Rapira Davies, Museum of New Zealand Te Papa Tongarewa, 2015. Curated by Megan Tamati-Quennell, this exhibition contrasted the work of these two senior female Māori artists and explored how their early work aligned with the 'Mana Wahine' movement; 'a movement that developed from the momentum of the feminist art and Māori protest movements of the 1970s'.

Five Māori Painters, Auckland Art Gallery, 2014. Curated by Ngahiraka Mason, this exhibition brought together the work of senior artists Karaka, Robyn Kahukiwa, and Kura Te Waru Rewiri with artists from a younger generation, Saffron Te Ratana and Star Gossage.

Karaka had a work presented, Kingitanga ki Te Ao (They Will Throw Stones), (2020) at the 22nd Sydney Biennale.

== Further information ==
- The Big Art Trip Series 1 Episode 2 features Emily Karaka
- Five Māori Painters: Emily Karaka interview recorded by Auckland Art Gallery 2014
- Emily Karaka talks about her 1984 work The Treaties audio-recording from the Museum of New Zealand Te Papa Tongarewa
- "Interview with Ngahiraka Mason, curator of Five Māori Painters". Standing Room Only, Radio New Zealand National. 2014.
- Personal and political Shona Rapira Davies and Emily Karaka interviewed by curator Megan Tamati-Quennell
- Emily Karaka in the collection of the Museum of New Zealand Te Papa Tongarewa
