= Keri Kaa =

New Zealand writer (1942–2020)

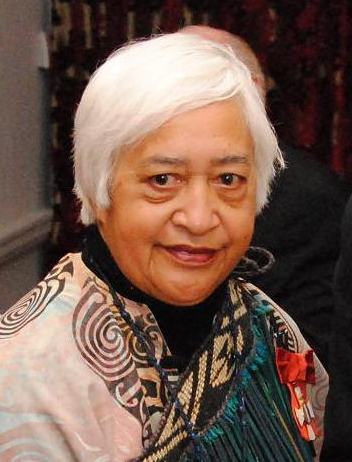
- Kaa in 2013
- Born: 1942; Rangitukia, New Zealand
- Died: 26 August 2020 (aged 77–78)
- Occupations: Writer and educator
- Known for: Māori language advocacy
- Awards: New Zealand Post Book Awards for Children and Young Adults

Hohi Ngapera Te Moana Keri Kaa CNZM QSO (1942 – 26 August 2020) was a New Zealand writer, educator, and advocate for the Māori language. She was of Ngāti Porou and Ngāti Kahungunu descent.

== Family and education ==
Kaa was born in 1942 in Rangitukia on New Zealand's East Cape. Her father was the Reverend Tipi Whenua Kaa, from Rangitukia, who was vicar of the Waiapu parish and her mother Hohipene Kaa (formerly Whaanga) was from Wairoa. Kaa was one of 12 children: her siblings include Hone Kaa (1941–2012), Anglican church leader and child welfare advocate; Arapera Blank (1932–2002), a writer and poetl and Wi Kuki Kaa (1938–2006), an actor.

Kaa attended Queen Victoria School for Māori Girls and Auckland Girls' Grammar. She spent a year in America after high school on an American Field Service scholarship and then attended Ardmore Teachers' College where in her second year she became the first woman to be the College President. She graduated with her teaching diploma in 1964; in 2013 she completed a Master of Arts through Te Wānanga o Raukawa.

== Career ==
Kaa taught at primary schools in Rangitukia, Wellington and the Hawke's Bay, Wellington High School, and secondary schools in the Hutt Valley. For fifteen years she was a lecturer at Wellington Teachers College, where she played a significant part in the founding and running of the college marae, Te Ako Pai. During her time in Wellington Kaa was involved with the Haeata Women's Collective (a group of Māori women artists), the Herstory diary project, the Waiata Koa collective and in organising vibrant book launches, for Patricia Grace's The Kuia & the Spider Te Kuia me Te Pūngāwerewere, which she translated into Māori with Hirini Melbourne; and, at Te Ako Pai, for Keri Hulme's the bone people.

After returning to Rangitukia, Kaa both taught and studied at the Te Wananga o Raukawa campus at Hicks Bay.

In addition to her education work, Kaa was also involved in Māori theatre, film-making and television. Her contribution was recognised in 2010 when she was profiled by Māori Television for their series on Māori leaders 'E Tu Kahikitea'. Her contribution was also recognised with two special awards from WIFT (Women in Film and Television) New Zealand.

Kaa was also a strong advocate for the Māori language (te reo Māori). Her children's book Taka Ki Ro Wai, written in the Waiapu dialect of Māori, won the inaugural Māori language category in the New Zealand Post Book Awards for Children and Young Adults and recognised in the National Design Awards for creative director Martin Page's work. The book was selected by the German Internationale Jugendbibliothek (International Youth Library) in its annual list of 'recently published books considered noteworthy due to their universal theme or their exceptional artistic and literary style'.

Kaa died on 26 August 2020, aged 78.

== Awards and recognition ==
- 2016 Ngā Tohu ā Tā Kingi Ihaka (Lifetime of service to Māori arts), 2016 Creative New Zealand Te Waka Toi Awards
- 2014 Inaugural Māori Language Award for the New Zealand Post Book Awards for Children and Young Adults
- 2013 Women in Film & Television (WIFT) New Zealand Mana Wahine Award
- 2012 Companion of the New Zealand Order of Merit, for services to Māori and the arts, in the 2013 New Year Honours
- 2010 WIFT Te Whaea Whakaata Taonga Award
- 2000 Companion of the Queen's Service Order for community service in the 2001 New Year Honours
