= Buck Nin =

New Zealand painter (1942–1996)

- Born: Buck Loy Nin; 5 August 1942; Northland, New Zealand
- Died: 14 August 1996 (aged 54); Hamilton, New Zealand
- Education: Northland College
- Alma mater: University of Canterbury; University of Hawaii; Texas Tech University
- Known for: Painting and contribution to the development of contemporary Māori art Establishment of Te Wānanga o Aotearoa

Buck Loy Nin (1942–1996) was a New Zealand artist and advocate influential in the development of contemporary Māori art and education in New Zealand. His landscape paintings have been included in survey exhibitions of contemporary Māori art including Te Waka Toi: Contemporary Maori Art that toured the United States in 1992 and Toi Tū Toi Ora: Contemporary Māori Art curated by Nigel Borrell and opened in 2020. He was also instrumental in the establishment of Te Wānanga o Aotearoa as a tertiary institution. Selwyn Muru called him 'Buck Nin the Mythmaker'..

== Early years ==
Nin was born on the 5 August 1942 in Northland, New Zealand. His father, Choung Nin, was from Guangzhou (Canton), China and his mother, Parehikanga Tatana, was from Poroutawhao in the Horowhenua. Through his mother, Nin affiliates to the Māori iwi (tribes) of Ngāti Huia, Ngāti Raukawa and Ngāti Toa. Nin was the oldest of four, with younger siblings Marie, Lynette (Dolly), and Muriel (adopted into the family as a young girl). The Nins tended to a large market garden on Mangakahia Road.

Nin was sick as a child. At age 8 he would complain of feeling tired often to his mother, however when taken to the Doctor's clinic, they'd dismiss the family's concerns and labelled him as a "lazy, Māori boy". His mother soon had enough and took him straight to the hospital, where they found he had rheumatic fever. From this time on he would be in and out of hospital due his poor health. It was during this time that he found a passion for art and learning, passing the time by drawing in his hospital bed and doing his studies.

Nin attended Northland College and was Dux in 1960. As a teenager his art teacher Selwyn Wilson encouraged him to study art after school. Selwyn Wilson was part of the Gordon Tovey New Zealand Department of Education programme of the 1950s to integrate customary Māori arts, craft and song into the curriculum.

== Education ==
Nin went to two art schools, first to Elam School of Fine Arts at the University of Auckland (1961–62) and subsequently to Ilam at the University of Canterbury where he graduated with a Diploma of Fine Arts in 1966. At Ilam the artist Rudi Gopas was his teacher.

In 1966 Nin alongside Baden Pere curated a large Māori art exhibition called New Zealand Maori Culture and the Contemporary Scene at the Canterbury Museum. They were shifting the language 'modern' to 'contemporary' for Māori art.

In 1973 Nin was a founding member of the Māori Artists and Writers Association in 1973. This society held annual marae-based meetings and exhibitions, in 1986 it was renamed Ngā Puna Waihanga in 1986, and was the precursor of Toi Māori Aotearoa (formed in 1996). In 1976 Nin was part of the South Pacific Festival of the Arts in Rotorua. Nin initiated an exhibition called Contemporary Māori Art at Waikato Art Museum also in 1976.

He studied at the University of Hawai'i after moving to Honolulu in 1978 and completed a Master of Education Administration. He also undertook a PhD in Arts Administration and Management at Texas Tech University graduating in 1981.

Nin and Rongo Wetere were part of the establishment of Te Wānanga o Aotearoa.

== Career ==
In 1966 Nin along with Baden Pere initiated one of the earliest exhibitions of contemporary Māori art at the Canterbury Museum called New Zealand Māori Culture and the Contemporary Scene. He was committed to the revival of Māori culture. There had also been an exhibition prior in 1966 at a festival of Māori arts held in Hamilton mounted by Paratene Matchitt and Cliff Whiting. These exhibitions were the foundational in the development of contemporary Māori art and included many artists had a lasting contribution to arts in New Zealand including John Bevan Ford, Pauline Yearbury, Cath Brown and Sandy Adsett.

Nin worked on the restoration of the wharenui (ancestral house) of Te Kooti, Rongopai that was built in 1881. This building is unusual in that it has painted motifs rather than carved which was innovative and a 'sharp departure from tradition'. It had restoration work under-taken between 1967 and 1979. Cliff Whiting also worked on this restoration. Nin made an artwork about his involvement in the restoration in painting called Rongopai Experience (1979).

Nin passing on his teachings and one of his students was Kura Te Waru Rewiri.

There was a tribute exhibition to Nin in 1998 where artist Selwyn Muru described his artwork saying,"Earth and Sky play their own tricks and games. At times eerie light and shadows appear to evoke Hawaiki."

Nin said of his inspiration, "The land is our heritage. It is the basis from which all creativity stems in Maoridom. For me it is a very strong element for its sustenance, its spiritual reality and the enlightenment it brings to my work."

Nin's art is held in many collections including Te Papa, University of Waikato, Auckland Art Gallery, James Wallace Arts Trust. This Land Is Ours (circa 1978) is the painting held by the Auckland Art Gallery. It is about the Māori land march led by Dame Whina Cooper in 1975. In the painting is group of people marching surrounded by stylised landform. The central figure probably represents Sir Kīngi Matutaera Īhaka. The title reflects the famous slogan of the march: ‘Not one more acre of Māori land’. Nin was always a politically engaged artist, identifying with Whina Cooper and the hīkoi marchers in 1975, and with those involved in the Bastion Point protests that began in January 1977. Nin participated in the land march and also the Bastion Point protest.

== Exhibitions ==
Some of the exhibitions including Nin's artwork are:

- Canterbury School of Arts (1966)
- Benson and Hedges Art Award (1968)
- Contemporary Maori Art, Waikato Museum of Art and History, Hamilton (1976)
- International Stone Carving Symposium, Timaru (1989)
- Kohia ko Taikaka Anake, National Art Gallery, Wellington (1990)
- Te Waka Toi: Contemporary Maori Art, (tour to the United States) (1992)
- Toi Tū Toi Ora: Contemporary Māori Art, Auckland Art Gallery (Sat 5 Dec 2020 – Sun 9 May 2021)
- Forever Buck Nin, retrospective touring exhibition curated by Pataka the Porirua museum of art and history.

== Personal life ==
Nin married Carolyn McLanachan in 1965. They had five children: Daymon, Errin, Pania, Daniel and Meiana.

== Death ==
Nin struggled with several health issues, including heart disease, diabetes, asthma, kidney failure and the aftermath of rheumatic fever. He died on 14 August 1996 in Temple View, Hamilton from a heart attack after an illness. He was 54 years old at the time of his death.

A 3-day tangihanga was held by his whānau in Temple View, Hamilton. Many of his relatives, friends and prominent leaders and orators from many tribes, including representatives of the Māori Queen Dame Te Arikinui Te Atairangi-Kaahu, attended the tangihanga. He was buried at Hamilton Park Cemetery in Newstead, Hamilton, where his mother was also buried.

In 2016, his wife, Carolyn McLanachan, died after a long battle with cancer. She was buried next to him.

They are survived by their children, grandchildren, and great-grandchildren.
