= Wi Kuki Kaa =

New Zealand actor (1938–2006)

- Born: 16 December 1938; Rangitukia, New Zealand
- Died: 19 February 2006 (aged 67); Wellington, New Zealand
- Occupation: Actor
- Years active: 1971–2006
- Notable work: Worzel Gummidge Down Under as Travelling scarecrow maker
- Relatives: Keri Kaa (sister); Hone Kaa (brother); Arapera Blank (sister)

Wi Kuki Kaa (16 December 1938 – 19 February 2006) was a New Zealand actor in film, theatre and television.

== Career ==
Kaa featured in many films, including the lead role of Iwi in Ngati (1987), written by Tama Poata and directed by Barry Barclay. Kaa won the "Best Film Performance, Male" at the 1988 New Zealand Film and TV Awards for this role, and in 1987 alongside Barclay, Poata and producer John O'Shea attended a screening at Cannes Film Festival in the Critics Week programme. He also played a lead role in the film Utu (1983) directed by Geoff Murphy. Kaa featured in the music video Little Things by Wellington roots dub band Trinity Roots. In 2006, Kaa died in Wellington aged 67.

== Filmography ==
=== Film ===
- Inn of the Damned (1975) – Tom
- Utu (1983) – Wiremu
- The Bounty (1984) – King Tynah
- Kingpin (1985) – Mr Nathan
- Ngati (1987) – Iwi
- Linda's Body (1990, Short) – Hemi
- Te Rau (1991) – Rewi Marangai
- Turangawaewae (2002) – Tiare (Koro)
- River Queen (2005) – Old Rangi

=== Television ===
- Homicide (1971) – Rollo
- Spyforce (1973) – Matthas / Hiromoto / Nikolu Yaratomo / Colonel Mayusaki / Sergeant Shikoya
- Silent Number (1974) – Tony
- Worzel Gummidge Down Under (1986–1987) – Travelling Scarecrow Maker
- The Diamond of Jeru (2001, TV Movie) – Inghai
- The Strip (2002) – Bible Bill
- Der Liebe entgegen (2002, TV Movie) – Henry Tufare

== Family ==
Kaa was born in Rangitukia on New Zealand's East Cape. He was from the Māori tribes of Ngati Porou and Ngati Kahungunu. His father was the Reverend Tipi Whenua Kaa, from Rangitukia, who was vicar of the Waiapu parish and his mother Hohipene Kaa (formerly Whaanga) was from Wairoa. He was one of 12 children. His siblings include: Keri Kaa, a writer and Māori language advocate; Hone Kaa, an Anglican church leader and child welfare advocate; and Arapera Blank, a writer and poet.
