= Whina =

Whina or Āwhina is a Māori female given name meaning "helper".

Whina or Āwhina may refer to:

- Dame Whina Cooper, New Zealand Māori activist
- Awhina Tamarapa, New Zealand museum curator
- Whina (film), a 2022 film depicting Whina Cooper's life
