= Manuel José (trader) =

Spanish trader, founding father of Paniora clan (1811–1873)

- Born: Manuel José de Frutos y Huerta; 31 January 1811; Valverde del Majano, Spain
- Died: 1873; Tikapa, New Zealand
- Resting place: Taumata, New Zealand
- Other name: Paniora
- Occupation: Trader
- Spouse(s): Te Herekaipuke "Tapita"; Kataraina; Mihita Heke; Uruhana; Maraea
- Children: 9
- Parents: José de Frutos (father); María Huerta (mother)

Manuel José de Frutos y Huerta (31 de January 1811–1873) was a Spaniard trader and founding father of Paniora clan in New Zealand.

== Biography ==
Born Valverde del Majano in Segovia, he arrived to New Zealand around 1833 and lived much of his life as a trader among the Māori people; he is described possessing: pale skin, red hair, and green eyes. He retired to Tikapa on the Waiapu River. He was married to five Ngāti Porou women, and has thousands of living descendants.

== Legacy ==
The 2014 play "Paniora" by Briar Grace-Smith was inspired by his legacy.
