= Ani Hona =

Maori writer

- Te Aniwaniwa Harepeka Nako Hona
- Born: Te Aniwaniwa Harepeka Hona; 18 April 1938; Mahinepua Island, New Zealand
- Died: 29 June 1997 (aged 59)
- Education: Wellington College of Education; Victoria University of Wellington
- Occupations: Writer; Translator; Historian
- Writing career
- Pen name: Ani Hona; Te Aniwa Bosch; Te Aniwa Hona

Te Āniwaniwa Harepeka Nako Bosch (18 April 1938 – 29 June 1997) was a New Zealand Māori writer, poet and founding member of the Te Reo Māori Society. She published under the names Ani Hona and Te Aniwa Bosch.

== Biography ==
Te Āniwaniwa Harepeka Nako Hona was born in 1938 at Mahinepua in "her grandmother's wash house". She grew up near Whangaroa Harbour and her base marae was Ngātiruamahue. Her father was a local policeman, who undertook successful campaigns against alcohol abuse and home brewing. She went to school at Wainui, and later to Northland College; she trained as a psychiatric nurse but later switched from nursing to a career in teaching. She studied at Wellington Teachers' College and Victoria University of Wellington, then later taught at Whangaroa College. She married John Barnard Bosch. They had three children. She died in 1997.

== Māori language writing and activism ==
Hona began to publish her writing in the 1960s under the name Te Aniwa Bosch, in journals from New Zealand, such as Te Ao Hou / The New World, Te Maori, Pacific Moana Quarterly, and from India such as Ocarina. In 1976 she was awarded a grant by the Maori Purposes Board for a creative writing project in Māori; in 1977 she was awarded a further grant for this work. As one of the founders of the Te Reo Māori Society she campaigned for Māori to be taught in schools. She was head of Māori Studies at Whangaroa College from 1980 to 1982.

After Hona left teaching she joined the Department of Conservation (New Zealand) as the Ngā Puhi representative, where part of her work was to enable better relations between Māori and the white population, particularly in terms of archaeological heritage. she began to collect and collate Tai Tokerau taonga including whakapapa and waiata. This work was described as a "suicidal feat" in the magazine Tu Tangata; in the same article Hona described how there was a thirst from younger Māori for language and tradition that was being lost as older people died.

Hona also worked as a translator for the Māori Land Court and the Alexander Turnbull Library.

== Selected works ==
- He putanga maomao (Wellington, 1997)
- A biography of Sir Graham Stanley Latimer (unpublished)

Hona was mostly recognised her creative writing and poetry published in a wide range of journals in Māori and in English. Sometimes both languages were published side-by-side.
