= Margaret Orbell =

New Zealand author, editor and academic (1935-2006)

Margaret Orbell CNZM
- Born: 17 July 1935; Auckland, New Zealand
- Died: 31 July 2006 (aged 71); Auckland, New Zealand
- Education: University of Auckland (Ph.D. in anthopology)
- Occupations: Author; editor; academic
- Spouse: Gordon Walters (m. 1963; died 1995)
- Children: 2
- Writing career
- Years active: 1962–2006
- Subject: Māori culture

Margaret Rose Orbell CNZM (17 July 1935 – 31 July 2006) was a New Zealand author, editor and academic. She was an associate professor of Māori at the University of Canterbury from 1976 to 1994. During her career, Orbell wrote several books on Māori literature and culture, edited numerous collections of songs, poetry and stories, and brought Māori works to a wider and international audience. She was an editor of bilingual magazine Te Ao Hou / The New World in the 1960s, and expanded the magazine's literary and historical content. In 2002, she was appointed a Companion of the New Zealand Order of Merit, for services to Māori and literature.

== Life and career ==
Orbell was born in Auckland and attended St Cuthbert's College. She later graduated from the University of Auckland, where she completed a Masters of Arts in English. In 1963, she married Gordon Walters, an artist. They had two children, and he died in 1995.

From 1962 to 1966 Orbell was the editor of bilingual quarterly Te Ao Hou / The New World, published by New Zealand's Māori Affairs Department and printed by Pegasus Press. During her time as editor, she ensured more literary content was included in the journal, and increased the number of translations of historical Māori texts. Her husband helped with the design and arranged for more artwork to be published in its pages.

During Orbell's work as editor of Te Ao Hou, she discovered that the Alexander Turnbull Library contained an extensive collection of untranslated Māori manuscripts containing Māori songs, poems and stories. Inspired by this discovery and determined to bring this literature to a wider audience, she returned to the University of Auckland to complete a Ph.D. in anthropology; her thesis was about waiata aroha (Māori love songs).

After lecturing in Māori at the University of Auckland between 1974 and 1975, Orbell moved to the University of Canterbury and became the associate professor of Māori. She retired in 1994 to return to Auckland and become a full time writer.

Orbell published a number of collections of Māori songs and folktales between 1968 and 1995, including many works that might otherwise have been lost. The Oxford Companion to New Zealand Literature wrote that her main achievement in these books was "to preserve fidelity to the Māori texts and their cultural connotations while arranging, introducing and translating them in ways that make them accessible to other cultures".

== Notable publications ==
Orbell's compilation of the anthology Contemporary Maori Writing (1970) included early works by a number of New Zealand Māori writers that were later to become significant figures in New Zealand literature, including Witi Ihimaera, Patricia Grace, Arapera Blank, Harry Dansey and Hirini Mead. It was the first anthology of contemporary Māori writing. New Zealand author Bill Pearson wrote a positive review of the anthology for the literary journal Landfall. A review in The Press said:

Since Maori writers rarely appear in New Zealand literary magazines, one tends to forget about them, and it is surprising to find in a book like this that there are so many obviously competent writers among the Maoris.

Orbell and her co-author of Traditional Songs of the Maori (1975), Mervyn McLean, were the first to publish Māori lyrics and music together, as previously Māori music had been largely ignored by Europeans. Providing the music together with the words enabled readers to understand how Māori music would have sounded. A review of her 1978 collection Maori Poetry: An Introductory Anthology noted that "the poetry is literature in its own right, subtle, moving and with a power to affect the emotions and thoughts of people living in today's quite different society".

The Natural World of the Maori (1985), with photographs by Geoff Moon, took four years to complete. It was praised by The Press for having a valuable, albeit non-Māori, perspective on how Māori historically saw New Zealand's natural world, and noted her "skilful summation of how, in Maori belief, the natural world and human experience were integrated with the world of the mind and spirit in a way they are not in the traditions of Western thought". In 1987 a five-part television series of the same name based on the book was screened on TVNZ 1, written and presented by Tipene O'Regan.

== Awards ==
In the 2002 New Year Honours, Orbell was appointed a Companion of the New Zealand Order of Merit, for services to Māori and literature.

Contemporary Maori Writing (1970) came second in the 1971 James Wattie Book of the Year Award. The judging panel said it "could well become a standard work in the special field it covered", and praised its editorial work and the material covered. The Natural World of the Maori (1985) received third place in the 1985 competition.

Traditional Songs of the Maori (1975), with co-author Mervyn McLean, received the Award for Non-Fiction at the inaugural New Zealand Book Awards in 1976. Illustrated Encyclopedia of Māori Myth and Legend (1995), Songs of a Kaumatua: As sung by Kino Hughes (2002) and Birds of Aotearoa: A Natural and Cultural History (2003) were finalists in the New Zealand Book Awards.

== Selected works ==
- Maori Folktales in Maori and English (1968)
- Contemporary Maori Writing (1970) (editor)
- Traditional Songs of the Maori (1975, 1990, with Mervyn McLean)
- Maori Poetry: An Introductory Anthology (1978)
- Select Bibliography of the Oral Tradition of Oceania (UNESCO, Paris, 1978)
- Penguin Book of New Zealand Verse (1985) (consultant editor)
- The Natural World of the Maori (1985, with photos by Geoff Moon)
- Waiata: Maori Songs in History (1991)
- Traditional Māori Stories (1992)
- Illustrated Encyclopedia of Māori Myth and Legend (1995)
- Songs of a Kaumātua: As sung by Kino Hughes (2002, with Mervyn McLean)
- Birds of Aotearoa: A Natural and Cultural History (2003)
