= Tereanini =

Māori migration canoe

- Great Māori migration waka
- Iwi: Ngāti Porou

Tereanini was one of the great ocean-going, voyaging canoes that was used in the migrations that settled New Zealand in Māori tradition.

Ngāti Porou traces its heritage back to Tereanini and a number of other waka.

According to oral history, it was captained by Rongomaituaho, who had followed his father Paikea (a key ancestor of Ngāti Porou) from Hawaiki.

== See also ==
- List of Māori waka
