= Geoff Moon =

New Zealand scientist

Geoff Moon OBE
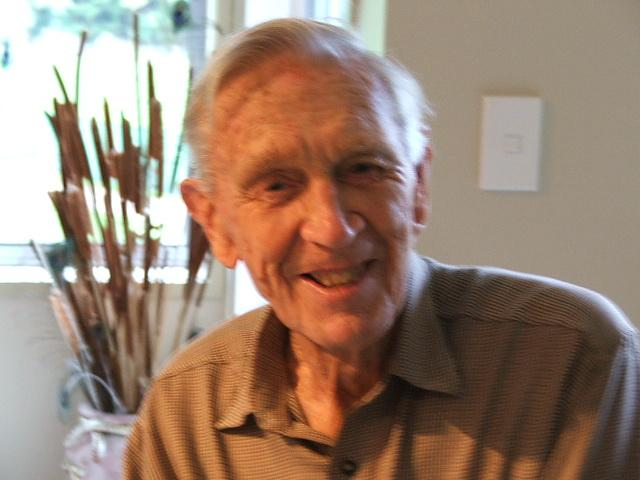
- Born: Geoffrey James Harwood Moon; 2 April 1915; China
- Died: 13 March 2009 (aged 93)
- Spouse: Lynnette Moon
- Children: Christopher Moon, Nicholas Moon, Timothy Moon, Jennifer Martin, James Moon, Josephine Moon

Geoffrey James Harwood Moon OBE (2 April 1915 – 13 March 2009) was a New Zealand naturalist, ornithologist, conservationist, veterinary surgeon and photographer. He was the author and photographer of many books on New Zealand birds and landscape. Moon was the patron of the Wingspan Birds of Prey Trust and the Photographic Society of New Zealand. He was also a Waitakere arts laureate, a distinguished life member of the Royal Forest and Bird Protection Society of New Zealand, an honorary fellow of the Photographic Society of New Zealand and an associate of the Royal Photographic Society of Great Britain.

Moon was born in China where his English parents were living while his father worked in a managerial position for Shell Oil. The family moved back to England for his education where he qualified as a veterinary surgeon at the Royal Veterinary College. Moon came to New Zealand in 1947 as the New Zealand Government was recruiting veterinary surgeons. Originally he worked and practised in Warkworth and surrounding area, where he lived with his family. In later years, he lived in Titirangi.

Moon was an honorary life member of the New Zealand Veterinary Association. In the 1994 Queen's Birthday Honours, he was appointed an Officer of the Order of the British Empire, for services to the veterinary profession and photography.

Moon died on 13 March 2009 at the age of 93.

== Reception ==
Moon's book The Reed Field Guide to New Zealand Birds was called an "[e]xcellent colour reference book" by The Rough Guide to New Zealand. The book is also recommended by Fodor's See It New Zealand.

Elizabeth B. Booz, Ben Simmons and Andrew Hempstead call Moon "New Zealand's best bird photographer"

== Publications ==
- Focus on New Zealand birds. (1960) A.H & A.W. Reed.
- Refocus on New Zealand Birds (1967) A.H & A.W. Reed.
- Photographing Nature (1970) A.H & A.W. Reed.
- The birds around us, New Zealand birds, their habits and habitats (1979), Heinemann.
- The children's guide to the birds of the New Zealand garden text by Gordon Ell; photographs, Geoff Moon (1979) Bush Press.
- The children's guide to the birds of the New Zealand seashore text by Gordon Ell; photographs, Geoff Moon (1979) Bush Press.
- Encouraging birds in the New Zealand garden by Gordon Ell; colour photographs by Geoff Moon (1981) Bush Press.
- The children's guide to the birds of the New Zealand forests text by Gordon Ell; photographs by Geoff Moon, M.F. Soper & others (1981) Bush Press.
- New Zealand Birds, a photographic guide ; with text by Ronald Lockley, (1982) Heinemann.
- The collected guide to the birds of New Zealand for children and beginners text by Gordon Ell; photographs, Geoff Moon (1982) Bush Press.
- Common and garden birds of New Zealand text by Gordon Ell; photographs Geoff Moon (1990) Bush Press.
- Seashore birds of New Zealand, photographs by Geoff Moon; text by Gordon Ell (1984) The Bush Press.
- The River: The Story of the Waikato; by Sue Miles & Geoff Moon (1984) Heinemann.
- New Zealand birds photographs by Geoff Moon; text by Gordon Ell (1985) Bush Press.
- The Natural World of the Maori; text by Margaret Orbell; photographs by Geoff Moon (1985) William Collins.
- The Kingfisher, by Sandra Morris & Geoff Moon (1985) Heinemann.
- Discover New Zealand Birds (1985) The Bush Press.
- Birds of the New Zealand forest Geoff Moon; [written by J. Cobb] (1985) Horwood.
- New Zealand The, Living Land (1986), X-S Books.
- New Zealand Birds in Focus (1988), Weldon New Zealand.
- What New Zealand Bird is That? (1991) Weldon.
- The living forests of New Zealand photographs by Geoff Moon & John Cobb; [text by John Cobb]. (1992) New Zealand Native Forests Restoration Trust.
- The children's guide to birds of the New Zealand rivers, lakes & open country text by Gordon Ell; photographs, Geoff Moon (1992) Bush Press.
- Nests written by Graham Meadows; photography by Graham Meadows and Geoff Moon (1993) Shortland.
- The Reed field guide to New Zealand wildlife (1994), Reed Books.
- Auckland Birds and Wildlife (1995), Reed New Zealand.
- Reed habitat guides (1995) Reed New Zealand.
- Bird behaviour: Living Together written by, Lynette Moon; photography by Geoff Moon (1995) Applecross; Auckland, NZ.
- Birds of the city written by Lynnette Moon; photography by Geoff Moon (1995) Applecross; Auckland, NZ.
- The Reed field guide to New Zealand birds (1996) Reed Books.
- Endangered birds written by Lynnette Moon; photographs by Geoff Moon (1996) Lands End Pub.
- Common Birds in New Zealand (Mobil New Zealand Nature) (1996) Reed New Zealand.
- The Singing Island : The Story of Tiritiri Matangi; by Lynnette Moon; photography by Geoff Moon (1998) Random House.
- New Zealand's Unique Bird's; by Brian Gill & Geoff Moon; photography by Geoff Moon (1999) Raupo Publishing.
- Rare Birds of New Zealand (Reed New Zealand Nature) (2000) Reed New Zealand.
- Bird Migration in New Zealand (2002). Reed Books.
- A photographic guide to: Birds of New Zealand (2002), New Holland.
- New Zealand Land of Birds (2002) New Holland Publishers.
- New Zealand birds in focus : a photographer's journey (2005) Reed Publishing.
- Bird’s-eye view : through the eyes of New Zealand birds; by Maria Gill; photography by Darryl Torkler & Geoff Moon (2006) Puffin.
- Know Your New Zealand... Birds; by Lynnette Moon; photography by Geoff Moon (2006) New Holland.
- Draw New Zealand birds: a step-by-step guide Heather Arnold; photographs by Geoff Moon and Rod Morris (2007) Reed.
- New Zealand Wetland Birds and their world (2009) New Holland.
- New Zealand Forest Birds and their world (2018) New Holland.
