= Valverde del Majano =

- Municipality
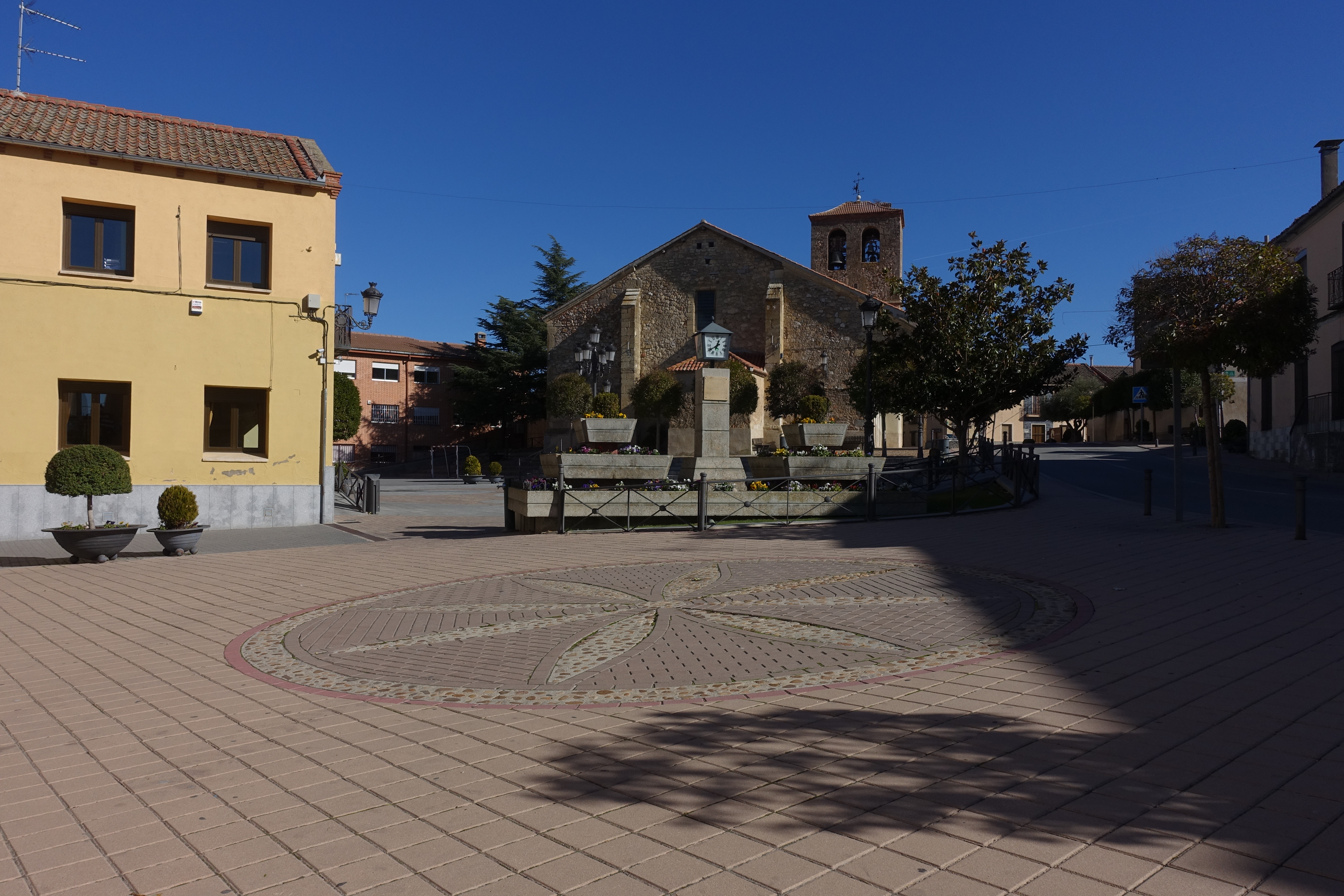

- Flag Coat of arms

- Location of Valverde del Majano Valverde del Majano (Spain)
- Coordinates: 40°57′24″N 4°15′05″W
- Country: Spain
- Autonomous community: Castile and León
- Province: Segovia
- Municipality: Valverde del Majano

Area
  - Total: 31 km^{2} (12 sq mi)

Population (2025-01-01)
  - Total: 1,097
  - Density: 35/km^{2} (92/sq mi)
- Time zone: UTC+1 (CET)
  - Summer (DST): UTC+2 (CEST)
- Website: Official website

Valverde del Majano is a municipality located in the province of Segovia, Castile and León, Spain. According to the 2004 census (INE), the municipality has a population of 561 inhabitants. It is a sister city of Gisborne, New Zealand.

== Notable residents ==
- Manuel José (1811 - 1873) – Spanish trader and founder of the Paniora clan of New Zealand
- Agapito Marazuela (1891-1983) - Spanish musician and etnomusicologist.
