= Hone Kaa =

New Zealand church leader (1941–2012)

Archdeacon Hone Kaa (9 April 1941 – 29 March 2012) was a New Zealand Anglican church leader, child welfare advocate and social-justice campaigner. He was a Māori of Ngāti Porou and Ngāti Kahungunu descent.

Born to Rev. Tipi (whenua) and Hohipine Kaa (née Whaanga) at Rangitukia on the East Cape, where Tipi was Vicar of Waiapu, Kaa grew up in Rangitukia and Bombay where he attended St Stephen's School. One sister, Keri Kaa, rose to become chair of the UNESCO New Zealand Culture Commission and won a 2011 AMP award to publish te reo Māori audio books; a second sister was the writer and poet Arapera Hineira Kaa Blank. His brother was a well-respected New Zealand actor Wi Kuki Kaa. Hone trained as a priest at St John's Theological College in Auckland from 1963 to 1965, then got a BA in Maori studies and a MA (Hons) in Education at the University of Auckland. Kaa then left for a DMin at Episcopal Divinity School, then in Cambridge, Massachusetts, US.

After working in parishes in Taupō and Pōrangahau, Kaa returned to Auckland to the Auckland Anglican Māori Mission, where he was minister from 1977 to 1983, and to St John's College. He rose to become Archdeacon of Tāmaki Makaurau.

Kaa was involved with the World Council of Churches and the Christian Conference of Asia and a figurehead in the New Zealand support for the anti-apartheid movement in South Africa. He was White Ribbon Ambassador for the anti-domestic violence White Ribbon Campaign. He was considered to be a "gay community friend".

Kaa served on a number of official boards including the Māori Reference Group for Whānau Ora. He presented programmes on both Māori radio and Māori television.

Kaa died in Auckland shortly after being diagnosed with lung cancer.
