= Tikapa =

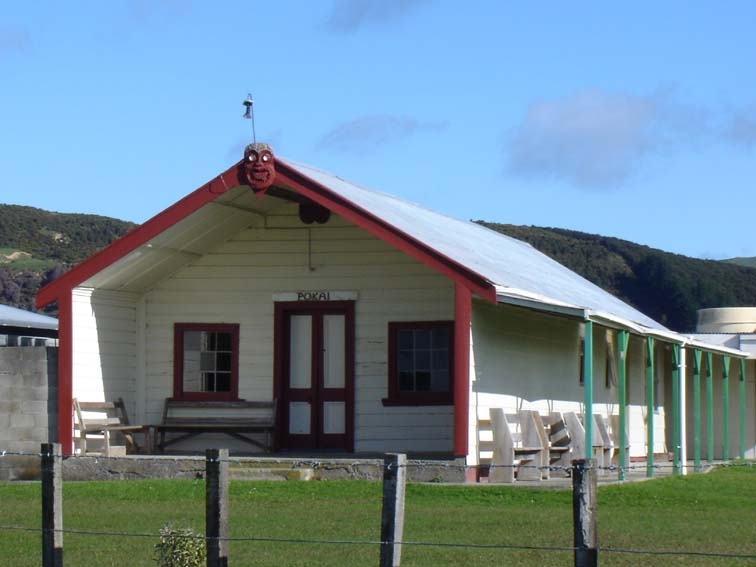
- Pokai meetinghouse, Tikapa, New Zealand
- Interactive map of Tikapa
- Coordinates: 37.79928°S 178.4428°E
- Country: New Zealand
- Region: Gisborne District
- Ward: Tairāwhiti General Ward
- Electorates: East Cape; Ikaroa-Rāwhiti (Māori)

Government
  - Territorial authority: Gisborne District Council
  - Mayor of Gisborne: Rehette Stoltz
  - East Cape MP: Dana Kirkpatrick
  - Ikaroa-Rāwhiti MP: Cushla Tangaere-Manuel
- Time zone: UTC+12 (NZST)
  - Summer (DST): UTC+13 (NZDT)
- Postcode: 4082
- Area code: 06

Tikapa is a rural community in the Gisborne Region of New Zealand. It is on the southern side of the Waiapu River mouth and north of Ruatoria. In 1952 the community numbered 156, predominantly Māori. There are several houses still standing, many of which have been left abandoned.

On the road heading toward the coast of Tikapa, is a small hilltop cemetery called Taumata. It is said that this is the place where Manuel José was buried. He was a Spanish whaler who in the early part of the 19th century was persuaded to stay in the Waiapu Valley by tribal chiefs. One of the chiefs gave away his five daughters to Manuel, and thus produced over 10,000 descendants today.

Tikapa Valley was also to be the site of a school in the mid 19th century, to cater for children who were living at Tikapa. However, Sir Āpirana Ngata offered to place the school further inward the valley towards Waiomatatini, where it was built and remained there until it closed in the 1970s.

== Marae ==
Tikapa Marae, located on a hill in the area, is the meeting place of the Ngāti Porou hapū of Te Whānau a Hineauta and Te Whānau a Pōkai. It includes the late 19th century Pōkai meeting house, the Pohatu dining room and Hinekopeka Urupa cemetery.

In October 2020, the Government committed $113,765 from the Provincial Growth Fund to upgrade the marae, creating an estimated 5.5 jobs.
