= Te Ao Hou / The New World =

New Zealand quarterly journal (1952–1975)

- Cover of first issue, Winter 1952
- Former editors: Erik Schwimmer (1952–1959); Bruce Mason (1960–1961); Margaret Orbell (1962–1966); Joy Stevenson (1967–1975)
- Frequency: Quarterly
- Publisher: Māori Affairs Department
- First issue: Winter 1952
- Final issue: June 1975
- Country: New Zealand
- Language: English; Māori
- Website: paperspast.natlib.govt.nz/periodicals/te-ao-hou

Te Ao Hou / The New World was a quarterly magazine published in New Zealand from 1952 to 1975. It was published by the Māori Affairs Department and printed by Pegasus Press. It was bilingual, with articles in both English and Māori, and covered a wide range of content including social and political issues, agriculture, crafts, obituaries, Māori legends and poetry and children's interests. A number of well-known New Zealand Māori authors were published for the first time in the magazine.

== History and content ==
Te Ao Hou / The New World was the first national magazine for Māori. The editorial of the first issue published in 1952 said that the magazine was designed "to provide interesting and informative reading for Maori homes", and that it would be like a marae, "where all questions of interest to the Maori can be discussed".

The Māori Affairs Department had intended to use the magazine as an agency for government policy, and there was some tension between government staff and the magazine staff as a result. Ernest Corbett, the Minister for Māori Development, stated in a 1954 memo that: "At outset the magazine was intended to assist the promotion of the objectives of the government ... I am given to understand that the magazine is now being regarded as the 'marae of the Maori people' where diverse subjects and thought are brought for discussion. That was never intended."

The magazine covered varied topics such as social and political issues, agriculture, wood carving and other crafts, obituaries, Māori legends and poetry, as well as material for children. Articles were written in both English and Māori, and even the crosswords were bilingual. Although none of the four editors of the magazine were of Māori descent themselves, they encouraged and featured writers of Māori descent, including republishing Māori writers and scholars from the nineteenth and early twentieth centuries. The magazine was available on subscription and sold to around 2.5% of Maori nationwide, although sales figures are likely to underestimate total readership given that it was distributed in schools.

A number of well-known New Zealand authors contributed to the magazine including Sidney Moko Mead (who published a series of original short stories written in Māori), Pei Te Hurinui Jones, Rēweti Kōhere, Joan Metge, J. C. Sturm, Kīngi Īhaka, Maharaia Winiata, Te Aniwa Bosch, Tūroa Royal, Percy Leo Fowler, Hone Tuwhare, Barry Mitcalfe, Rowley Habib, Witi Ihimaera and Patricia Grace. Some pieces first published in the magazine enjoyed success elsewhere: a short article by Arapera Blank published in the October 1958 issue won a prize for the best short article in the Katherine Mansfield Memorial Competition 1959. In 1959 a special issue was published focussing on Māori writers. In 1970, Margaret Orbell (who had been editor of the magazine between 1962 and 1966) published an anthology, Contemporary Maori Writing. A review in The Press commented that many of the writers' work had first been published in Te Ao Hou.

A number of literary competitions were run by the magazine, particularly in the early years when it was necessary to encourage submissions. In 1960, Pita Sharples, then a pupil at Te Aute College, won the English category of a writing competition held by the magazine. The magazine's editor at the time, Bruce Mason, commented after the competition that: "I expect – I say this in full confidence – that the next ten years will produce a Maori novelist of outstanding talent; already the ground is being prepared for him." Twelve years later, the first Māori fiction book was published (Pounamu Pounamu by Witi Ihimaera).

Te Ao Hou ceased publication in 1975, and was succeeded by Department magazines Te Kaea (1979–81) and Tu Tangata (1981–87).

== Editors ==
- Erik Schwimmer (1952–1959)
- Bruce Mason (1960–1961)
- Margaret Orbell (1962–1966)
- Joy Stevenson (1967–1975)
