= Nigel Borell =

New Zealand curator and artist

Nigel Borell MNZM
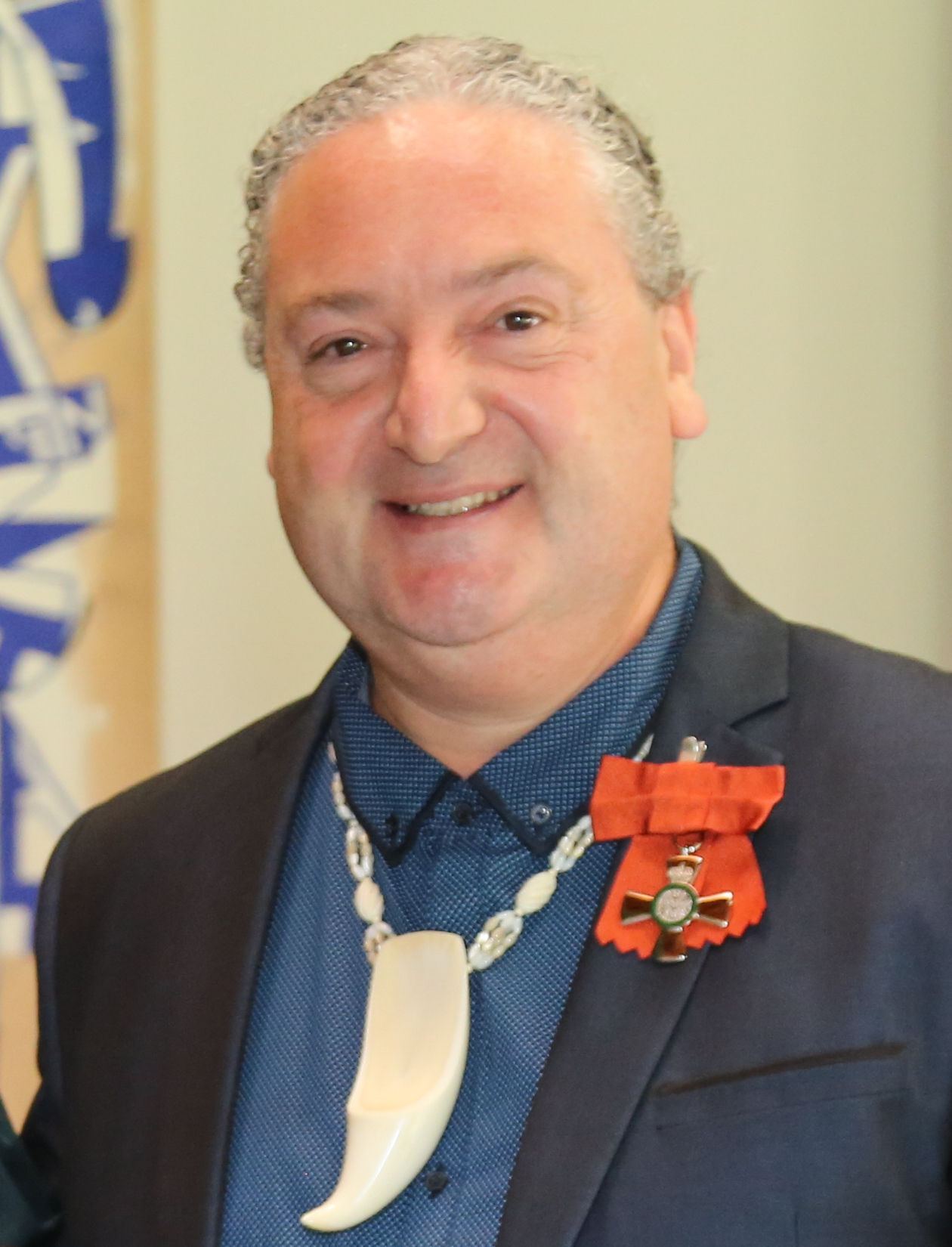
- Borell in 2022
- Born: Nigel John Floyd Borell; 1973 (age 52–53)

Academic background
- Education: Massey University - BMVA; Elam School of Fine Arts - MFA

Academic work
- Discipline: Contemporary Māori Art
- Institutions: Auckland Art Gallery Toi o Tāmaki; Auckland War Memorial Museum Tāmaki Paenga Hira

Nigel John Floyd Borell MNZM (born 1973) is a New Zealand Māori artist, curator, and Māori art advocate. He curated the exhibition Toi Tū Toi Ora: Contemporary Māori Art at the Auckland Art Gallery Toi o Tāmaki in 2020, the largest exhibition since they opened. In 2021 the Art Foundation of New Zealand created an award (He Momo – A Moment in Time Award) to acknowledge the work of Borell in this exhibition.

== Biography ==
Borell was born in 1973 and grew up in Ōtāhuhu and Manurewa in South Auckland. He is a twin and has two older siblings. Borell is Māori of Pirirākau, Ngāi Te Rangi, Ngāti Ranginui, and Te Whakatōhea descent.

His early influences include artist Cliff Whiting and the Peter Gossage series of Māui illustrated books. He completed a Bachelor of Māori Visual Arts at Massey University in Palmerston North in 2000. There he studied under Robert Jahnke, Kura Te Waru Rewiri, Shane Cotton and the Toioho ki Apiti programme. He followed this by completing a Master of Fine Arts at Elam School of Fine Arts, University of Auckland in 2003. He has hands-on experience in Māori arts, working on three meeting house projects under tohunga whakaio Pakariki (Paki) Harrison 1995-2000 and kowhaiwhai artist Peter Boyd, and has been influenced by Māori curators Megan Tamati-Quennell and Ngahiraka Mason.

Borell was Associate Curator Māori Art at Auckland War Memorial Museum Tāmaki Paenga Hira from 2013-2015 and Curator Māori Art at Auckland Art Gallery from 2015-2020. At the gallery he worked for years on the largest exhibition since the gallery opened over 130 years ago called Toi Tū Toi Ora: Contemporary Māori Art. It featured work by 111 Māori artists and brought in more visitors than any other exhibition since 1989. The documentary of the exhibition is by Chelsea Winstanley. Borell resigned from his role at the art gallery in late October, leaving 23 December 2020 two weeks after Toi Tū Toi Ora opened stating that there was a lack of control awarded to him in the lead up and calling for 'colonial institutions to share power more equally'.

In 2022 it was announced he would return to Auckland War Memorial Museum as Curator Taonga Māori, the role previously held by Chanel Clarke. Borell is a trustee and curator of The Wairau Māori Art Gallery in the Hundertwasser Building in Whangārei, the first public Māori art gallery solely dedicated to profiling Māori artists and curators.

== Art ==
Borell’s meetinghouse projects include: The kowhaiwhai and mural work for "Te Pou Herenga Waka' meetinghouse, James Cook High School Marae, Manurewa (1993-94) The kowhaiwhai and mural work for "Matukurua" meetinghouse Manurewa Marae, Manurewa (1994–95) The papaka kowhaiwhai panels for "Rakairoa" meetinghouse Harataunga Marae, Kennedy Bay, Coromandel (1995–96) The kowhaiwhai rafter panels for "Kete Uruuru Matua" meetinghouse Ngā Kete Wānanga Marae, (1999-2000) Manukau Institute of Technology, Ōtara. The kowhaiwhai rafter panels for "Te Puna Matauranga" meetinghouse Northtec Marae, Whangārei (2015) The kowhaiwhai panels - assisting Saffronn Te Ratana for "Te Whaioranga o Te Whaiao" meetinghouse Te Rau Karamu Marae, Massey University Wellington (2016-2018)

== Selected publications ==
Borell, N (Ed). Toi Tū Toi Ora: Contemporary Māori Art, Penguin Random House New Zealand; 202

Borell, N. Māori Art: From the Margins to the Centre. In: Nagam, J; Tamati-Quennell, M & Lane, C (Eds), Becoming Our Future, Global Indigenous Curatorial Practice , ARP Books, Winnipeg, Manitoba, Canada. 2020

Borell, N. He Whariki Toi, He Whariki Tangata. In: Friend, R (Ed), Toi Koru - Sandy Adsett. Pataka Museum and Art Gallery, 2021.

Borell, N. The Māori Portraits, Scenes of Māori Life and Custom. In: Mason, N & Stanhope, Z (Eds), Gottfried Lindauer’s New Zealand: The Māori Portraits. Auckland University Press, 2016.

Borell, N. Ngā Momo Whakaaro -Kura Te Waru Rewiri. In Mason, N (Ed), Five Māori Painters. Auckland Art Gallery Toi o Tamaki, 2014.

Te Atinga: 25 years of Contemporary Māori Art. Wellington, New Zealand: Toi Maori Aotearoa, 2013. ISBN 9780958234146

Borell, N Ed). Kura: Story of a Maori Woman Artist. Mangere Arts Centre- Nga Tohu o Uenuku, 2012.

== Awards and honours ==
- Appointed a Member of the New Zealand Order of Merit in the 2022 New Years Honours for services to Māori art.
- 2021 - Art Foundation’s inaugural He Momo – A Moment in Time Award for the Toi Tū Toi Ora exhibition.

== Exhibitions ==
- Pirirakau: Bush Beautiful, The Lane Gallery, Auckland 2006
- Kura: Story of a Māori Woman Artist, The Mangere Arts Centre - Nga Tohu o Uenuku, Auckland 2010
- The Māori Portraits: Gottfried Lindauer’s New Zealand, Auckland Art Gallery Toi o Tāmaki/Young Fine Arts Museum, Auckland/San Francisco 2017
- Toi Tū Toi Ora: Contemporary Māori Art, Auckland Art Gallery Toi o Tāmaki, Auckland 2020
- Puke Ariki, Wairau Māori Art Gallery, Hundertwasser Art Centre, Whangārei, 2022
- Indigenous Histories: Rupturing Representation, The Museum of Art, São Paulo, Brasil and Kode Bergen Art Museum, Norway (2023-2024)
- Lisa Reihana: He Wai Ngunguru, Nomads of the Sea, Wairau Māori Art Gallery, Hundertwasser Art Centre, Whangārei, 2023
