= Anaura Bay =

Bay and community in the Gisborne District of New Zealand

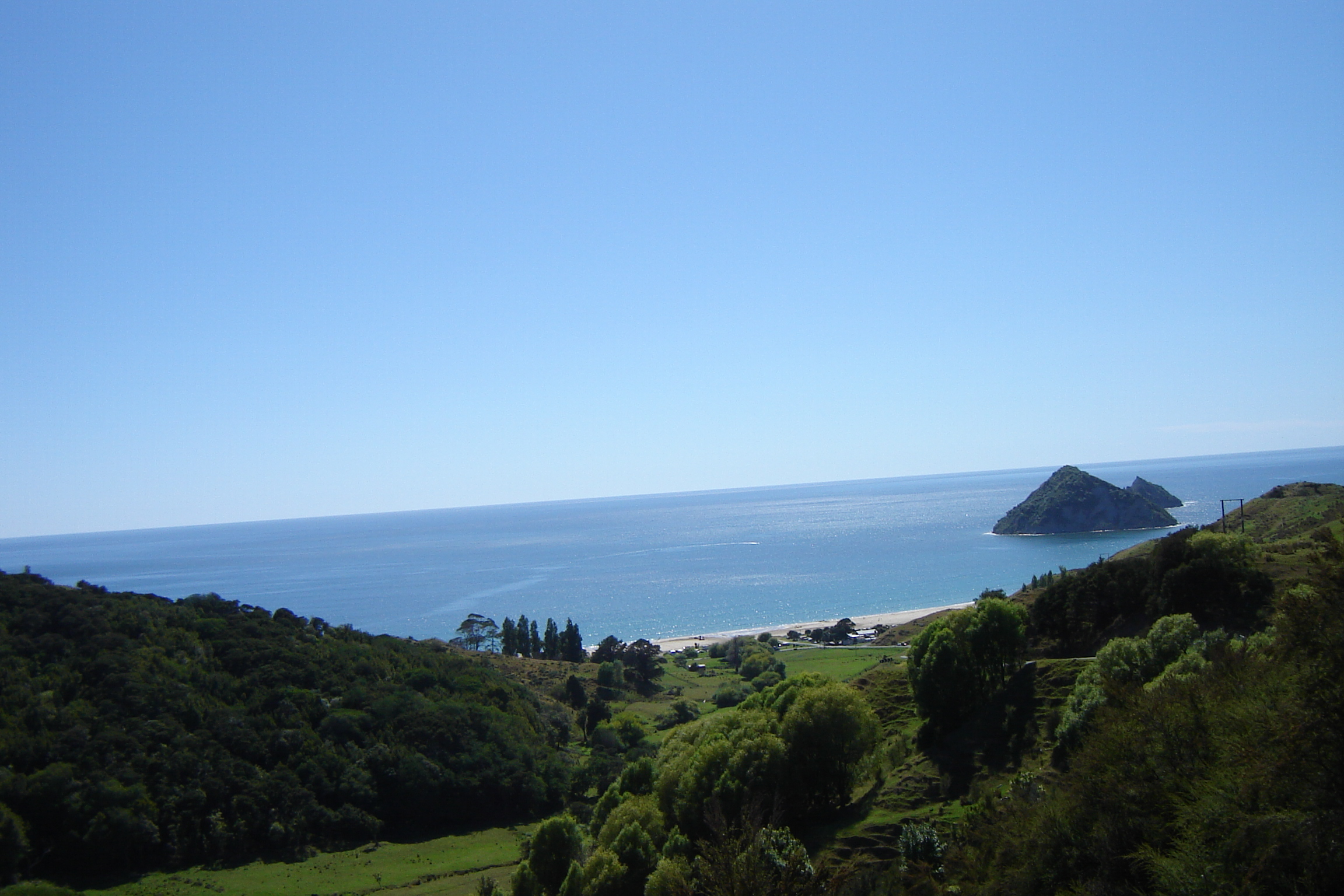
- Interactive map of Anaura Bay
- Coordinates: 38.247552°S 178.315930°E
- Country: New Zealand
- Region: Gisborne District
- Ward: Tairāwhiti General Ward
- Electorates: East Cape; Ikaroa-Rāwhiti (Māori)

Government
  - Territorial authority: Gisborne District Council
  - Mayor of Gisborne: Rehette Stoltz
  - East Cape MP: Dana Kirkpatrick
  - Ikaroa-Rāwhiti MP: Cushla Tangaere-Manuel
- Time zone: UTC+12 (NZST)
  - Summer (DST): UTC+13 (NZDT)
- Postcode: 4077
- Area code: 06

Anaura Bay is a bay and community in the Gisborne District of New Zealand's North Island. It is located just south of Tokomaru Bay and north of Tolaga Bay.

British explorer James Cook landed at the southern end of the bay on 21 October 1769, where he met local Māori. A village and motor camp are now located at this site.

The nearby Hinetamatea Marae is a tribal meeting place for Te Aitanga-ā-Hauiti and the Ngāti Porou hapū of Ngāti Hau, Ngāti Ira, Ngāti Wakarara and Ngāti Patu Whare. It includes a meeting house of the same name.

A scenic reserve is located at the northern end of the bay. It includes a walkway and campsite. It has been named as one of the best beaches in New Zealand.
