= Piripi Taumata-a-Kura =

New Zealand evangelist

Piripi Taumata-a-Kura (fl. 1823–1868) was a notable New Zealand Māori evangelist. Of Māori descent, he identified with the Ngāti Porou iwi. He was born in Whakawhitira, East Coast, New Zealand and was active from about 1823.
