= Stephenson Island (New Zealand) =

Island in New Zealand

- Location within New Zealand

Geography
- Location: Whangaroa Bay
- Coordinates: 34°58′S 173°47′E
- Total islands: 1
- Area: 1.1 km^{2} (0.42 sq mi)
- Length: 2.4 km (1.49 mi)
- Width: 0.8 km (0.5 mi)
- Highest elevation: 132 m (433 ft)
- Highest point: Ririwha

Administration
- New Zealand

Demographics
- Population: 0
- Pop. density: 0/km^{2} (0/sq mi)

Stephenson Island, also called Mahinepua Island, is the larger of a pair of small islands 3,275 metres (2.035 mi) off the northern coast of New Zealand in Whangaroa Bay. It is approximately 1.5 miles (2.4 km) long and 0.5 miles (0.80 km) wide, positioned with the major axis running northwest to southeast. The area is 112 hectares (0.43 sq mi). Immediately to the northwest lies the smaller Cone Island. Satellite imagery indicates that the islands are partially forested and contain only two sites with buildings as discernible signs of habitation.

Land Information New Zealand records show that the islands are jointly owned by eleven families and are classified as Maori Land.

The Māori name for Stephenson Island is Mahinepua Island, which is rarely seen on maps; both are official names for the island. The highest point is Ririwha, at 132 metres (433 ft) elevation.

== Notable people ==
- Ani Hona (1938–1997), writer, poet; founding member of the Te Reo Māori Society

== See also ==
- List of islands of New Zealand
- List of islands
- Desert island
