= Sofia Minson =

New Zealand artist

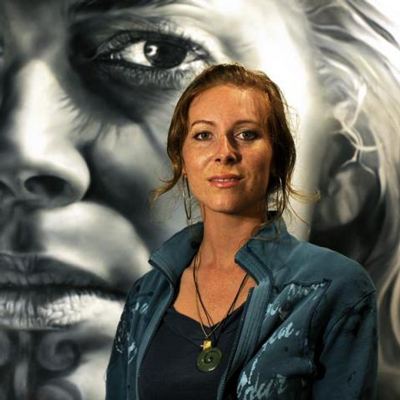
- Sofia Minson with oil painting "The Other Sister"
- Born: Auckland, New Zealand
- Education: Bachelor of Arts & Design
- Known for: Oil Painting, Street art
- Awards: 1st Prize Molly Morpeth Canaday Art Award 2005, 1st Prize Art Auckland Award 2005 & 2010, People's Choice Adam Portraiture Awards Christchurch 2012, Finalist Adam Portraiture Awards 2008, 2010 & 2012
- Website: newzealandartwork.com

Sofia Minson (born 1984) is a contemporary New Zealand oil painter of Māori (Ngati Porou), Swedish, English and Irish descent.

== Life and career ==
Sofia Minson was born in Auckland, New Zealand and spent her childhood living in Samoa, New Zealand, China and Sri Lanka due to her father's engineering project management work.

In 2005, Minson won first prize in two New Zealand art awards – the Molly Morpeth Canaday Art Award with her piece entitled "Saffron Monk" and the ART Auckland Award with her mythological Maori artwork "The Separation of Rangi and Papa". She graduated with a BDes degree in Spatial Design from Auckland University of Technology in 2006 and in 2010 Minson won the ART Auckland Awards for a second time. She has been a three-time finalist in the Adam Portraiture Award, in 2008 with her mystical landscape/portrait painting "From Hikurangi to Hibernia", in 2010 with her surreal self-portrait "Effulgent Self" and in 2012 with her 2-metre-wide black and white portrait "The Other Sister". In September 2010 Sofia judged the North Shore City Art Awards alongside art advisor, curator and author Liz Caughey and sculptor Jeff Thompson.

She has exhibited extensively throughout New Zealand from 2004 onwards and in 2006 was invited to show her works at the museum at Estense Castle, Ferrara, Italy and in Chelsea, New York. Minson's first solo exhibition entitled "Te Here Tangata – The Rope of Mankind" was held in Auckland in October 2007 and featured 14 large-scale portraits and landscapes referencing her mixed heritage and Maori myths. The artist has subsequently had solo exhibitions at the Gallery Helena Bay Hill in Northland, Erenus Art Gallery in Ankara, Turkey, Toi o Tahuna Gallery in Queenstown, McCarthy Gallery in Auckland, Red Spot Gallery in Rotorua and Parnell Gallery in Auckland.

== Contemporary Maori oil portraits ==
Embarking on a Contemporary Maori Oil Portrait series in 2011, Minson has since painted prominent figures in Maori culture such as activist Tame Iti, musicians Tiki Taane and Stan Walker, Tā moko artist Turumakina Duley and social anthropologist Dame Joan Metge. The portrait of Metge was commissioned by the New Zealand Portrait Gallery for the Makers of Modern New Zealand 1930–1990 exhibition and is now part of their permanent collection.

Minson and five other New Zealand artists were chosen for a collaborative arts project that was filmed for a 1 1/2-hour documentary called Canvassing the Treaty, which aired on Maori TV on Waitangi Day 2010 and at the international film festival in 2011.

== Selected exhibitions ==
- 2012 Solo exhibition at the Gallery Helena Bay Hill, Northland, NZ
- 2011 "The Makers of Modern NZ" Exhibition at New Zealand Portrait Gallery, Wellington, NZ
- 2011 Solo exhibition at Red Spot Gallery, Rotorua, NZ
- 2011 Joint Show with Aaron Kereopa at Toi o Tahuna Gallery, Queenstown, NZ
- 2011 Joint Show "Connecting Threads" with Matt Gauldie at Parnell Gallery, Auckland, NZ
- 2010 Solo exhibition at Toi o Tahuna Gallery, Queenstown, NZ
- 2010 Adam Portraiture Awards national touring exhibition of finalists, NZ
- 2010 "What it is to be Kiwi" group show at Harrisons Gallery, Tauranga, NZ
- 2009 Solo exhibition at McCarthy Gallery, Auckland, NZ
- 2009 "Shave An Artist" charity art auction and artist head shaving event, Auckland, NZ
- 2009 Solo exhibition at the Gallery Helena Bay Hill, Northland, NZ
- 2008 Solo exhibition "Beyond Wrongdoing and Rightdoing" at Toi o Tahuna Gallery, Queenstown, NZ
- 2008 Solo exhibition at Erenus Art Gallery, Ankara, Turkey
- 2008 Solo exhibition at the Gallery Helena Bay Hill, Northland, NZ
- 2008 International group show, The Dolmabahce Palace Museum, Istanbul
- 2007 Australian and New Zealand Art Exhibition at Agora Gallery, New York City
- 2007 Solo exhibition "The Rope of Mankind" at Aveia Gallery, Auckland, NZ
- 2007 "Meridian Energy Plunket Art Show 2007″, Aigantighe Art Gallery, Timaru, NZ
- 2006 "Magic" international group exhibition at Estense Castle in Ferrara, Italy
- 2005 "Different Places Different Faces", three artist show, Lake House Gallery, Akl, NZ
- 2005 Molly Morpeth Canaday Art Awards, Whakatāne, NZ
- 2004 Ronald McDonald House Charity Silent Auction, NZ

== Awards ==
- 2012 Finalist, Adam Portraiture Awards, Wellington, NZ
- 2010 1st Prize, ART Auckland Awards, Auckland East Arts Council, NZ
- 2010 Finalist, Adam Portraiture Awards, Wellington, NZ
- 2008 Finalist, Adam Portraiture Awards, Wellington, NZ
- 2007 Diploma of Excellence, Artoteque's online global art annual
- 2005 1st Prize, Auckland East Arts Council Art Competition, NZ
- 2005 1st Prize, Molly Morpeth Canaday Art Awards, Whakatāne, NZ
- 2004 Merit Award, Auckland East Arts Council Art Competition, NZ
