= Shona Rapira Davies =

New Zealand artist

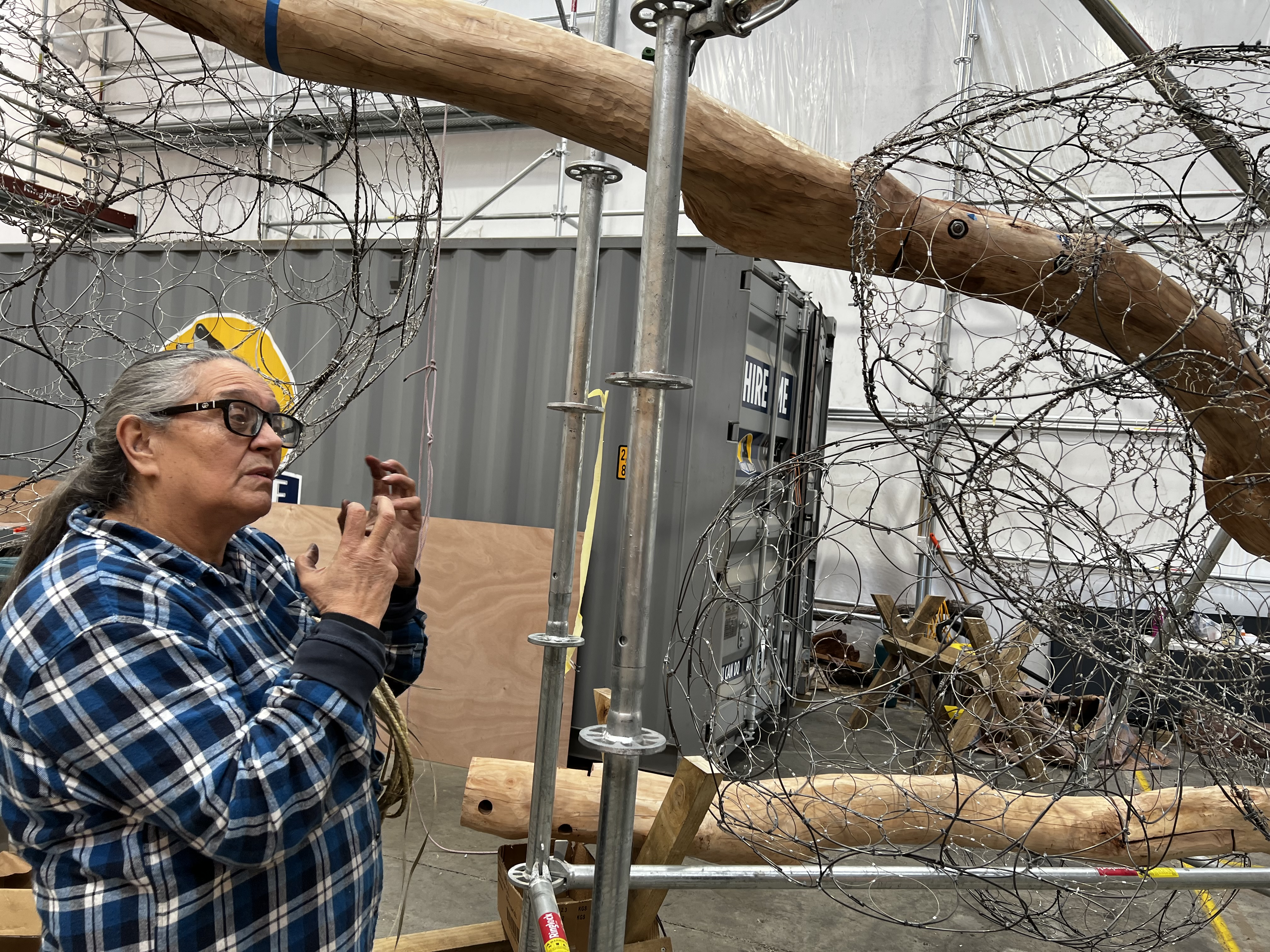
- Shona Rapira Davies in her Wellington studio, 2022
- Born: 1951 (age 74–75)
- Education: Otago Polytechnic, Dunedin
- Occupation: Sculptor
- Awards: Frances Hodgkins Fellow 1989
- Website: shonarapiradavies.com

Shona Rapira Davies (born 1951) is a New Zealand sculptor and painter of Ngātiwai ki Aotea tribal descent currently residing in Wellington, New Zealand.

== Education ==
Rapira Davies first studied at the Auckland College of Education, majoring in art, and later at the Otago Polytechnic in Dunedin, graduating with a Diploma in Fine Arts in 1983. In 1989, she was awarded the prestigious Frances Hodgkins Fellowship and a residency for indigenous artists at the Banff Centre of the Arts in Canada.

Rapira Davies recalls she felt isolated in her identity while studying in Dunedin but the experience taught her the value of patience.

== Career ==
She exhibits widely; both as a sculptor and as a painter. Rapira Davies is interested in the empowerment of Māori women in spite of perceived racism (in a Pākehā culture) and sexism (within the patriarchal structure of Māori tribal organisation). She uses her art work to make statements about perceived injustices against Māori.

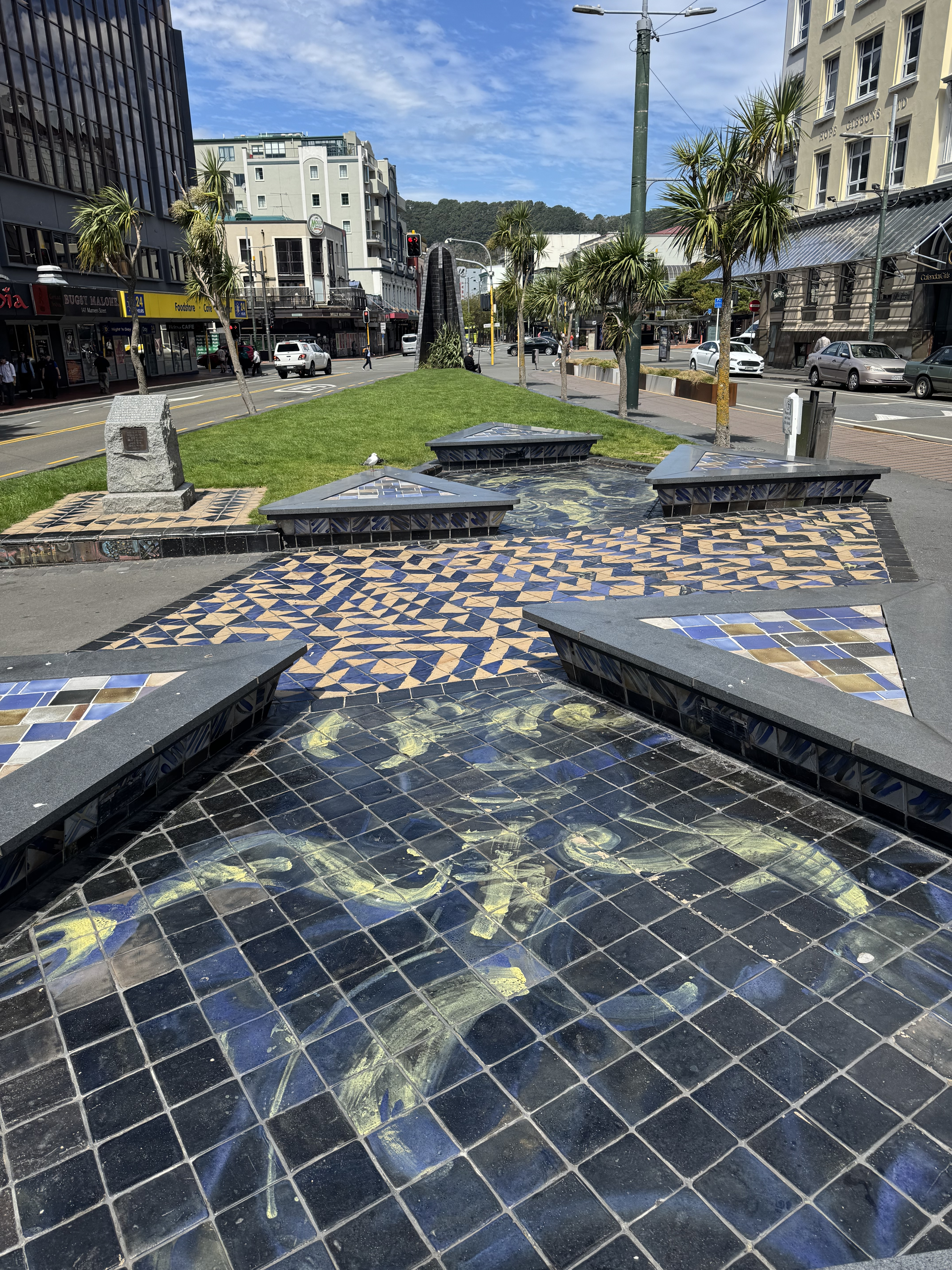
Te Aro Park, Wellington

She is well known for her landscape sculpture commission for Te Aro Park (previously called Pigeon Park) in central Wellington. The ceramic tile permanent work is considered one of New Zealand's most successful public sculptures. Set in a narrow triangle of public space with adjacent busy roads and much foot traffic it is a very visible work.

One of Rapira Davies' major works, the sculptural installation Nga Morehu (1988), the title of which translates to 'the survivors', is held by the Museum of New Zealand Te Papa Tongarewa, along with preparatory drawings. The work was originally made for Whakamamae ('to feel pain'), an exhibition Rapira Davies had with painter Robyn Kahukiwa at the Wellington City Art Gallery in 1988. Ngā Morehu pays tribute to the strength and resilience of Māori women. The work depicts the karanga, the call of welcome performed by women which begins ceremonial occasions, through a group of terracotta figures arranged on an unfinished whāriki (woven flax mat). The whāriki is mentioned by Rapira Davies as being the defining component of the piece. Her daughter completed the weaving after very little instruction, and which Rapira Davies describes as her journey into adulthood. A naked female child faces a group of women advancing towards her, performing the karanga, and at the end of the mat is a seated kuia (female elder). The body of the child is adorned with the words of a contemporary poem and that of the kaikaranga (the women leading the karanga) with the words of a waiata (a song), while the other female forms carry racial slurs. Curator Megan Tamati-Quennell writes:

Reflecting the rise of the political Māori voice and the place of feminism in New Zealand art at the time, Ngā Morehu portrays the impact of colonisation on Māori culture and Māori women particularly. Yet Rapira Davies' work suggest transcendence too, by revealing a ritual state rarely portrayed, and through it, a Māori definition of beauty, status and worth.

In 2015, Te Papa opened a focus exhibition on Rapira Davies and fellow senior artist Emily Karaka which includes Ngā Morehu alongside preparatory sketches and more recent works.

=== Exhibitions ===
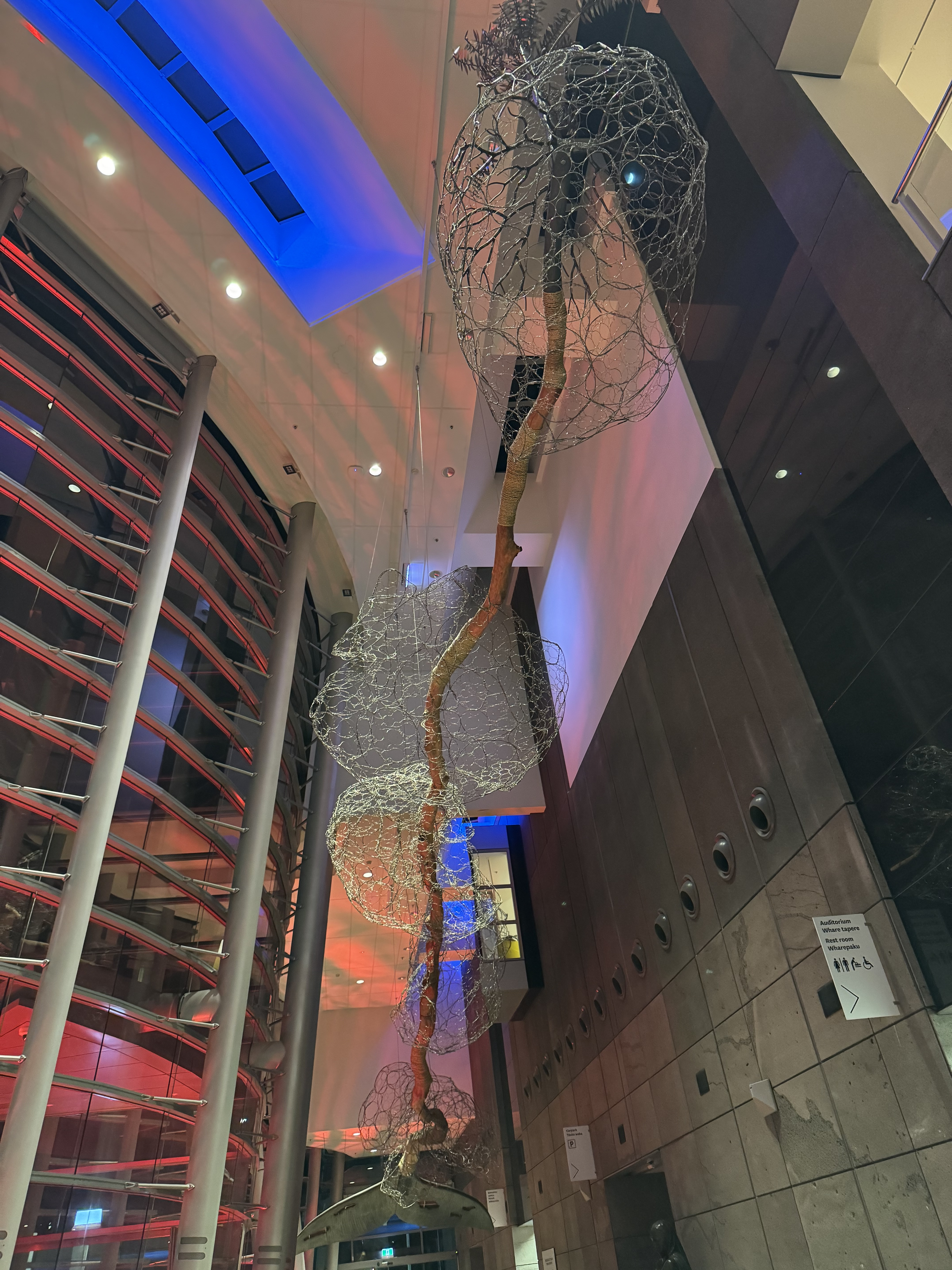
'Ko Te Kihikihi Taku Ingoa' installed at the Christchurch Art Gallery (2025)

==== Solo ====
- Hone Heke, Art Attack Gallery, Dunedin. 1981
- Toku Whanau, Marshall Seifert Gallery, Dunedin. 1984
- Tangi, Marshall Seifert Gallery, Dunedin. 1985
- Wāhine, Wāhine, Marshall Seifert Gallery. 1985
- Kōrero au Taku Tamaiti, Bowen Galleries. 1986
- Ko Te Kihikihi, Govett-Brewster Art Gallery / Len Lye Centre. 2022
- Ko Te Kihikihi Taku Ingoa, Govett-Brewster Art Gallery / Len Lye Centre. 2022
- Ko Te Kihikihi Taku Ingoa, Christchurch Art Gallery. 2025

==== Selected group exhibitions ====
- Māori Arts Festival, Women's Gallery, (also Hocken Library Gallery, Dunedin) Wellington. 1980
- Aramoana, City Art Gallery, Wellington. 1980
- ANZART, Christchurch Arts Centre, Christchurch. 1980
- Content/Context, National Art Gallery of New Zealand, Wellington. 1986
- Whakamamae, Wellington City Art Gallery, 1988

== Collections ==
Her works are held at Te Papa and Auckland Art Gallery.
