= Awhina Tamarapa =

New Zealand art curator

Awhina Tamarapa is a New Zealand Māori museum curator and writer in the field of museum studies. She has tribal affiliations to Ngāti Kahungunu, Ngāti Ruanui and Ngāti Pikiao.

Tamarapa has a Master of Philosophy in Museum Studies from Massey University, a Bachelor of Māori Laws and Philosophy from Te Wānanga o Raukawa, Otaki and a Bachelor of Arts from Victoria University of Wellington, majoring in anthropology.

She has held several positions at the Museum of New Zealand Te Papa Tongarewa: collection manager, concept developer and curator. Exhibitions she has curated for the museum include Kahu Ora/Living Cloaks (2012) and the Ngāti Toa Rangatira iwi exhibition, Whiti Te Ra! The Story of Ngāti Toa Rangatira.

Tamarapa has been a guest speaker in the museum heritage studies post-graduate programme at Victoria University of Wellington for a number of years. She has also written and edited publications on Māori artefacts. She wrote Whatu Kākahu/Māori Cloaks (2011) with Rangi Te Kanawa and Anne Peranteau. This book was a finalist in the New Zealand Post Book Awards 2012 and winner of the arts category in the Kupu Ora Māori Book Awards in 2012.

== Publications ==
- Rangi Te Kanawa, Awhina Tamarapa, Anne Peranteau. 'Kahu Ora -Living Cloaks, Living Culture', in Brooks, Mary M. and Eastop, Dinah D. (Eds.), Refashioning and Redress: Conserving and Displaying Dress. Los Angeles: Getty Conservation Institute
- Tamarapa. A. (2004). Selected texts. In Icons/Ngā Taonga-Treasures of Te Papa Collections. Wellington: Te Papa Press.
- Tamarapa, A. (2007). Five essays in Smith, Huhana. Editor (Ed.), Taiaawhio II: 18 New Conversations with Contemporary Māori Artists. Wellington: Te Papa Press.
- Tamarapa, A. (2007). Weaving a Journey. In Labrum, B., McKergow, F., & Gibson, S. (Eds.), Looking Flash: Clothing of Aotearoa New Zealand (pp.94–111 ). Auckland: Auckland University Press.
- Tamarapa, A. Muka taonga (treasures) in the collections of the Museum of New Zealand Te Papa Tongarewa (2009). Combined (NZ and Aus) Conference of the Textile Institute. Conference Proceedings, CD.
- Tamarapa, A. (2011). Mere Ngareta’s Kahu Kiwi. In McKergow, Fiona and Taylor, Kerry. (Eds.), Te Hao Nui The Great Catch: Object Stories from Te Manawa (pp.158–165). Auckland: Random House.
- Tamarapa, A. (Ed.).(2011). Whatu Kākahu / Māori Cloaks . Wellington: Te Papa Press.
- Awhina Tamarapa and Patricia Wallace. ‘Māori clothing and adornment – kakahu Māori’, Te Ara – the Encyclopedia of New Zealand, updated 27 August 2013
