= Ngāti Porou =

Māori iwi (tribe) in Aotearoa New Zealand

- Iwi (tribe) in Māoridom
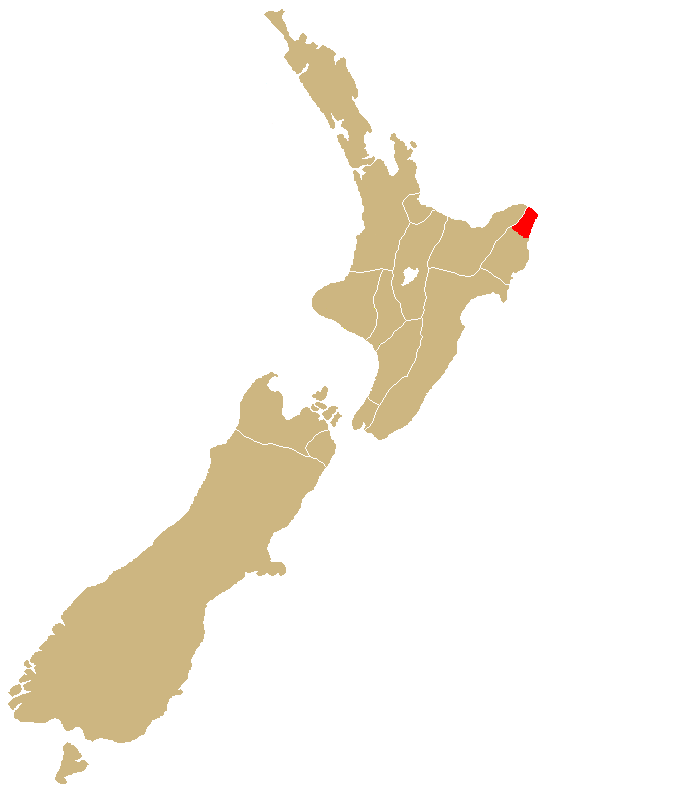
- Rohe (region): East Cape and Gisborne region
- Waka (canoe): Horouta
- Population: 102,480 (2023)
- Website: www.ngatiporou.iwi.nz

Ngāti Porou is a Māori iwi traditionally located in the East Cape and Gisborne regions of the North Island of New Zealand. It has the second-largest affiliation of any iwi, behind Ngāpuhi, with an estimated 102,480 people according to the 2023 census. The traditional rohe or tribal area of Ngāti Porou extends from Pōtikirua and Lottin Point in the north to Te Toka-a-Taiau (a rock that used to sit in the mouth of Gisborne harbour) in the south. The Ngāti Porou iwi comprises 58 hapū (sub-tribes) and 48 mārae (meeting grounds).

Mount Hikurangi features prominently in Ngāti Porou traditions as a symbol of endurance and strength, and holds tapu status. In these traditions, Hikurangi is often personified. Ngāti Porou traditions indicate that Hikurangi was the first point to surface when Māui fished up the North Island from beneath the ocean. His canoe, the Nuku-tai-memeha, is said to have been wrecked there. The Waiapu River also features in Ngāti Porou traditions.

== History ==
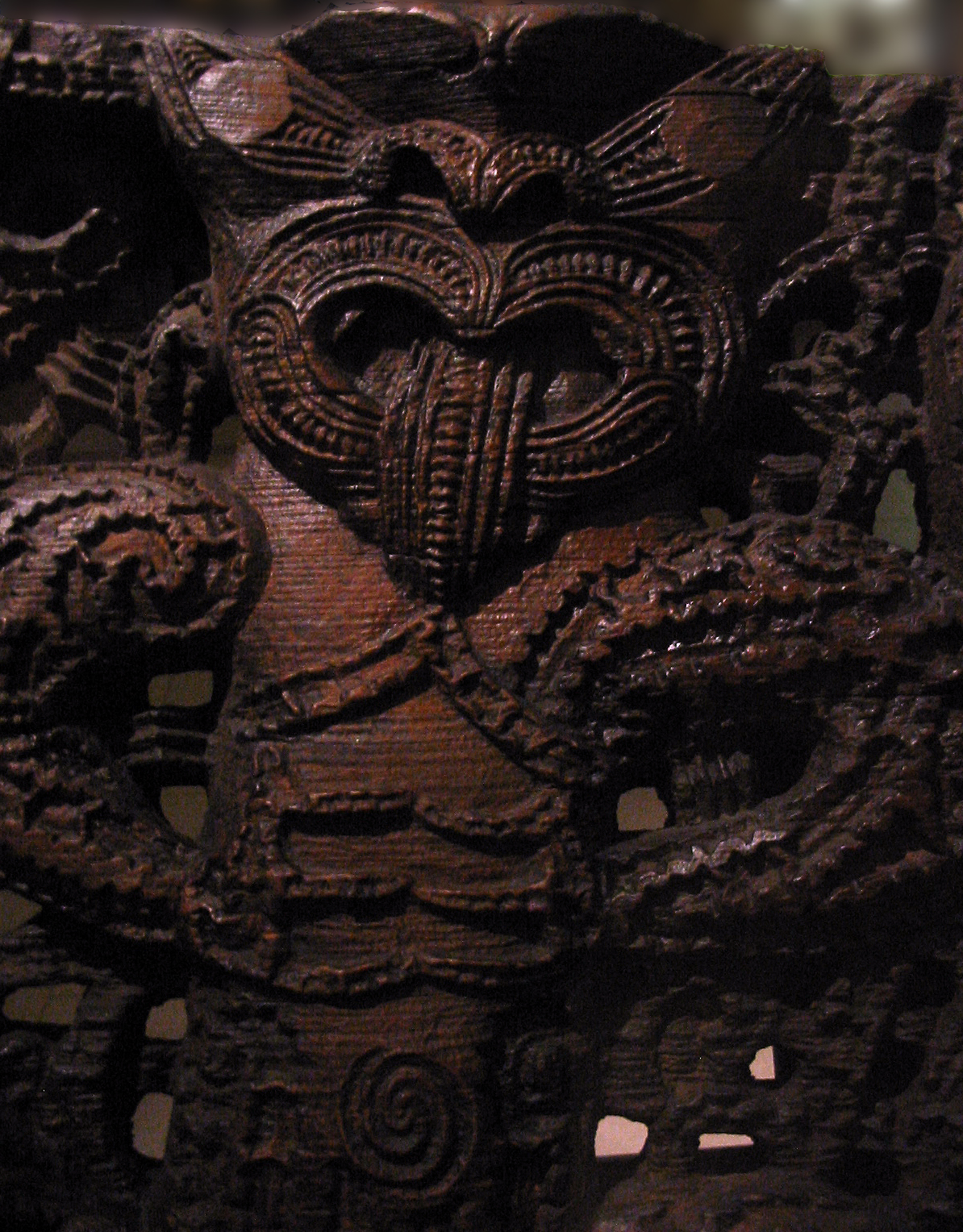
Ngāti Porou paepae pātaka (threshold of a storehouse) in the Waiapu Valley

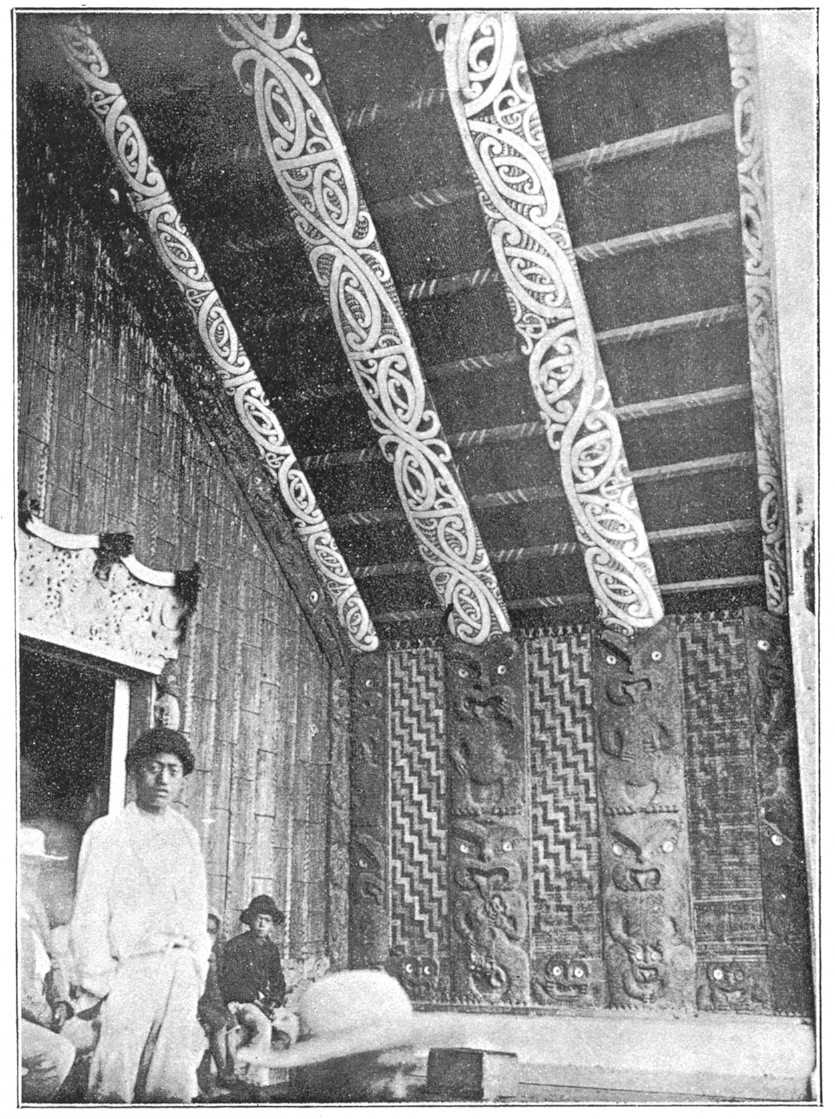
Wharenui (meeting house) in Waiomatatini, 1896, named Porourangi after the ancestor Ngāti Porou derive their name from.

=== Pre-European history ===
Ngāti Porou takes its name from the ancestor Porourangi, also known as Porou Ariki. He was a direct descendant of Toi-kai-rākau, Māui (accredited in oral tradition with raising the North Island from the sea), and Paikea the whale rider.

Although Ngāti Porou claim the Nuku-tai-memeha as their foundation canoe, many Ngāti Porou ancestors arrived on different canoes, including Horouta, Tākitimu and Tereanini. The descendants of Porourangi and Toi formed groups that spread across the East Cape through conquest and through strategic marriage alliances.

Genealogical associations with other iwi also arise through direct descent from Ngāti Porou ancestors:

- Kahungunu, descending from Ueroa (the second son of Porourangi), is the founding ancestor of Ngāti Kahungunu.
- Taua, descended from Kahungunu, is a prominent ancestor in Te Whānau-ā-Apanui genealogy.
- Ngāti Raukawa and the Tainui iwi have association through Porourangi's daughter Rongomaianiwaniwa and through the marriage of the ancestress Māhinaarangi to Tūrongo.
- Tahupōtiki, younger-brother to the Porourangi, is Ngāi Tahu's founding ancestor.

=== Colonial history ===
Ngāti Porou sustained heavy losses over the course of the Musket Wars, a period of heightened warfare between iwi unleashed by the adoption of firearms and resulting power imbalances. The iwi's first experience of musket warfare came in 1819, when a raid by Ngāpuhi rangatira Te Morenga led to the capture and killing of many members, including two rangatira. That same year a second attack by Hongi Hika of Ngāpuhi and Te Haupa of Ngāti Maru targeted the iwi’s pā at Wharekahika Bay, but Te Haupa was slain and the raid was repelled at the cost of heavy casualties. Heavy defeats came at the hands of a raiding party led by the Ngāpuhi rangatira Pōmare I and Te Wera Hauraki, who through force and guile sacked the pā of Okauwharetoa and Te Whetumatarau near Te Araroa. Te Wera Hauraki’s forces would then move on to sack additional pā in the area of Waiapu River and Whareponga Bay. A final defeat at the hands of Ngāpuhi took place in 1823, when a preemptive attack by a large army of Ngāti Porou warriors on Pōmare’s trespassing forces in Te Araroa was cut down in open field by musket fire. The rangatira Taotaoriri was then able to negotiate a favourable peace between the two iwi, a deal sealed by his marriage to the Ngāti Porou noblewoman Hikupoto and the return of Rangi-i-paea, who had been abducted and married to Pōmare in a previous raid. This peace was to have important religious consequences, as a number of Ngāti Porou rangatira freed by Ngāpuhi in later negotiations would go on to spread the Christianity they had adopted from European missionaries during the course of their captivity.

A second wave of violence rocked Ngāti Porou starting in 1829, when the presence of Ngāti Porou passengers on the ship where the Ngāti Awa rangatira Ngarara was assassinated by Ngāpuhi marked the iwi as a target for retribution. Minor raids by Ngāti Awa and their allies Whakatōhea and Te Whānau-ā-Apanui in 1829 and 1831 resulted in the deaths of some Ngāti Porou, which triggered retaliatory action from the iwi. In 1832 Ngāti Porou joined forces with Ngāpuhi, Rongowhakaata, and Te Aitanga-a-Māhaki to seize Kekeparaoa pā and expel the four hundred Whakatōhea members who had come to occupy it after being unilaterally invited to do so by a Te Aitanga-a-Māhaki hapū. A second 1832 raid, this time against Te Whānau-ā-Apanui, did not meet with the same success, as the defenders of Wharekura pā rebuffed the attackers and slew two Ngāti Porou rangatira. Two years later, a retaliatory raid by Te Whānau-ā-Apanui was in turn rebuffed by forces under the rangatira Kakatarau, whose father Pakura was killed at Wharekura. Ngāti Porou then joined forces with Te Wera’s Ngāpuhi and Te Kani-a-Takirau’s Rongowhakaata to attack Te Whānau-ā-Apanui at Te Kaha Point’s formidable Toka a Kuku pā. After six months of siege and heavy fighting, including the defeat of numerous sorties and the routing of a relief force of fourteen hundred warriors from Whakatōhea, Ngāi Tai, and Ngāti Awa, the attackers eventually proved unable to seize the pā and returned home. The extraordinary battlefield feats of the Christian Ngāti Porou rangatira Piripi Taumata-a-Kura lent him enormous prestige, which he soon leveraged to convert other Ngāti Porou rangatira and lead Te Whānau-ā-Apanui and Ngāti Porou to a peace accord in 1837.

The waning of the Musket Wars and the unifying influence of Christianity ushered in a period of relative calm and cultural development. Ngāti Porou chiefs were also signatories to the Treaty of Waitangi in 1840. Ngāti Porou experienced substantial economic growth during the 1850s.

During the 1860s, the Pai Mārire religious movement spread through the North Island, and eventually came into conflict with the New Zealand Government. From 1865–1870, a civil war emerged within Ngāti Porou between Pai Mārire converts seeking the creation of an independent Māori state (supported by Pai Mārire from other regions) and other Ngāti Porou advocating tribal sovereignty and independence. This conflict is generally viewed as part of the East Cape War.

=== Modern history ===
Ngāti Porou once again enjoyed peace and economic prosperity during the late 19th century. The 1890s saw the emergence of Sir Āpirana Ngata, who contributed greatly to the revitalisation of the Māori people. During the early 20th century, the population of Ngāti Porou increased substantially. They were active in their participation in both World Wars.

After World War II, large numbers of Ngāti Porou began emigrating from traditional tribal lands and moving into larger urban areas, in a trend reflected throughout New Zealand. A large portion of the tribal population now lives in Auckland and Wellington.

== Hapū and marae ==
Name	Rohe (tribal area)	Marae (meeting grounds)	Location
Ngāi Taharora	Waiapu ki Tawhiti	Taharora	Waipiro Bay
Ngāi Tamakoro	Potikirua ki Waiapu	Tutua	Te Araroa
Ngāi Tangihaere	Waiapu ki Tawhiti	Kariaka, Ruataupare, Whareponga	Ruatoria
Ngāi Tāne	Potikirua ki Waiapu	Hinepare, Ōhinewaiapu	Rangitukia
Ngāi Tutekohi	Tawhiti ki Rototahe	Hauiti	Tolaga Bay
Ngāti Hau	Tawhiti ki Rototahe	Hinetamatea	Anaura Bay
Ngāti Hokopū	Potikirua ki Waiapu	Hinepare, Ōhinewaiapu	Rangitukia
Ngāti Horowai	Waiapu ki Tawhiti	Te Horo	Port Awanui
Ngāti Ira	Tawhiti ki Rototahe	Ōkurī, Tuatini	Tolaga Bay, Tokomaru Bay
Ngāti Kahu	Potikirua ki Waiapu	Punaruku	Hicks Bay
Ngāti Kahukuranui	Tawhiti ki Rototahe	Hauiti, Hinemaurea ki Mangatuna, Ōkurī	Tolaga Bay
Ngāti Kōnohi	Rototahe ki Te Toka a Taiau	Te Poho o Rawiri, Whāngārā	Kaitī, Whāngārā
Ngāti Nua	Potikirua ki Waiapu	Hinepare, Ōhinewaiapu	Rangitukia
Ngāti Oneone	Rototahe ki Te Toka a Taiau	Te Poho o Rawiri	Kaitī
Ngāti Patu Whare	Tawhiti ki Rototahe	Te Rawheoro	Tolaga Bay
Ngāti Putaanga	Potikirua ki Waiapu	Kaiwaka, Putaanga	Tikitiki
Ngāti Rangi	Waiapu ki Tawhiti	Reporua	Ruatoria
Ngāti Tuere	Potikirua ki Waiapu	Hinemaurea ki Wharekahika, Hinerupe, Tutua	Rangitukia, Hicks Bay
Ngāti Uepōhatu	Waiapu ki Tawhiti	Mangahanea Marae, Uepōhatu, Umuariki	Ruatoria, Tūpāroa
Ngāti Wakarara	Tawhiti ki Rototahe	Hinetamatea	Tokomaru Bay
Te Aitanga a Hauiti	Tawhiti ki Rototahe	Hauiti, Te Rawheoro	Tolaga Bay
Te Aitanga a Materoa	Waiapu ki Tawhiti	Hiruhārama, Penu Marae, Rongohaere, Whareponga	Ruatoria
Te Aowera	Waiapu ki Tawhiti	Hiruhārama, Te Aowera	Ruatoria
Te Whānau a Hineauta	Waiapu ki Tawhiti	Tikapa	Tikapa
Te Whānau a Hinekehu	Waiapu ki Tawhiti	Kariaka, Rauru	Ruatoria
Te Whānau a Hinepare	Potikirua ki Waiapu	Hinepare, Awatere, Hinerupe, Hurae, Kaiwaka, Rāhui	Rangitukia, Te Araroa, Tikitiki
Te Whānau a Hinetāpora	Waiapu ki Tawhiti	Mangahanea Marae, Te Heapera	Ruatoria
Te Whānau a Hunaara	Potikirua ki Waiapu	Matahī o Te Tau, Ōhinewaiapu	Horoera, Rangitukia
Te Whānau a Iritekura	Waiapu ki Tawhiti	Iritekura	Waipiro Bay
Te Whānau a Karuwai	Potikirua ki Waiapu	Hinerupe, Karuwai, Waiomatatini	Te Araroa, Tikitiki, Ruatoria
Te Whānau a Mahaki	Waiapu ki Tawhiti	Te Horo	Port Awanui
Te Whānau a Pōkai	Waiapu ki Tawhiti	Tikapa	Tikapa
Te Whānau a Rākaihoea	Waiapu ki Tawhiti	Kākāriki	Waiomatatini
Te Whānau a Rākaimataura	Potikirua ki Waiapu	Rāhui	Tikitiki
Te Whānau a Rākairoa	Waiapu ki Tawhiti	Akuaku, Kie Kie	Waipiro Bay, Ruatoria
Te Whānau a Rerewa	Potikirua ki Waiapu	Hinepare, Ōhinewaiapu	Rangitukia
Te Whānau a Ruataupare ki Tokomaru	Tawhiti ki Rototahe	Pakirikiri, Tuatini, Waiparapara, Ruatepupuke II	Tokomaru Bay
Te Whanau a Ruataupare ki Tuparoa	Waiapu ki Tawhiti	Tūpāroa	Tūpāroa
Te Whānau a Takimoana	Potikirua ki Waiapu	Ōhinewaiapu	Rangitukia
Te Whānau a Tapuaeururangi	Potikirua ki Waiapu	Pōtaka	Pōtaka
Te Whānau a Tāpuhi	Potikirua ki Waiapu	Taumata o Tapuhi	Rangitukia
Te Whānau a Te Aotakī	Potikirua ki Waiapu	Hinemaurea ki Wharekahika	Hicks Bay
Te Whānau a Te Aotawarirangi	Tawhiti ki Rototahe	Te Ariuru	Tokomaru Bay
Te Whānau a Te Haemata	Waiapu ki Tawhiti	Kie Kie	Waipiro Bay
Te Whānau a Te Rangipureora	Tawhiti ki Rototahe	Puketawai Marae	Tolaga Bay
Te Whānau a Te Uruahi	Potikirua ki Waiapu	Tinātoka Marae	Tikitiki
Te Whanau a Tinatoka	Potikirua ki Waiapu	Te Poho o Tinatoka	Tikitiki
Te Whānau a Tuwhakairiora	Potikirua ki Waiapu	Hinemaurea ki Wharekahika, Hinerupe	Hicks Bay, Te Araroa
Te Whānau a Umuariki	Waiapu ki Tawhiti	Umuariki	Tūpāroa
Te Whānau a Uruhonea	Waiapu ki Tawhiti	Te Horo	Port Awanui

== Governance ==
Te Rūnanga o Ngāti Porou was established in 1987 to be the tribal authority of the iwi. It is organised into a whānau and hapū development branch, economic development branch, and a corporate services branch, and aims to maintain the financial, physical and spiritual assets of the tribe. The common law trust is overseen by a board, with two representatives from each of the seven ancestral zones. As of 2022, the Rūnanga is based in Gisborne, and is chaired by Selwyn Parata, with George Reedy as the chief executive.

The trust administers Treaty of Waitangi settlements under the Ngati Porou Claims Settlement Act, represents the iwi under the Māori Fisheries Act, and is the official iwi authority for resource consent consultation under the Resource Management Act. Its rohe is contained within the territory of Gisborne District Council, which is both a regional and district council.

== Media ==
Radio Ngāti Porou is the official station of Ngāti Porou. It is based in Ruatoria and broadcasts on 89.3 FM in Tikitiki, 90.5 FM at Tolaga Bay, 93.3 FM in Gisborne, 98.1 FM in Ruatoria, and 105.3 FM at Hicks Bay.

== Notable people ==
There are many notable people who are affiliated to Ngāti Porou. This is a list of some of them.

- Russell Crowe, actor
- Alex Aiono, singer
- Georgina Beyer, politician
- Keisha Castle-Hughes, actress
- Rory Fallon, football player and assistant coach of All Whites
- Hosea Gear, rugby player, coach of East Coast rugby team
- Rico Gear, rugby player
- Parekura Horomia politician
- Witi Ihimaera, writer
- Moana Jackson, lawyer
- Ka Hao, te Reo Māori youth choir
- Hone Kaa, church leader and child welfare advocate
- Keri Kaa, writer, educator, and advocate for the Māori language
- Kuni Kaa Jenkins, author, educationalist and research
- Wi Kuki Kaa, actor
- Robyn Kahukiwa, artist and children's author
- Hēnare Kōhere, farmer and soldier
- Mōkena Kōhere, politician
- Rēweti Kōhere, Anglican minister
- Derek Lardelli, tā moko artist, painter, carver, kapahaka performer, composer, graphic designer, researcher
- Shannon McIlroy, lawn bowler
- Sofia Minson, artist
- George Nēpia, rugby player
- Te Moana Nui a Kiwa Ngarimu VC
- Āpirana Ngata, politician
- Arihia Ngata, community leader
- Linda Ngata, urban Māori authority manager and community leader
- Rob Ruha, musician
- Shane Rufer, sportsman
- Wynton Rufer, sportsman
- William Singe, singer
- John Tamihere, politician
- Iritana Tāwhiwhirangi, educationalist
- Tayi Tibble, poet
- Te Ngahuru, 28th Maori Battalion
- Mohi Tūrei, Anglican minister
- Stan Walker, singer, actor, and television personality
- Patricia Te Arapo Wallace, academic
- Fanny Howie (aka Fanny Rose Poata, Te Rangi Pai, Princess Te Rangi Pai) singer and composer, wrote Hine E Hine
- Brad Weber, rugby player for New Zealand All Blacks and the current captain of the Maori All Blacks
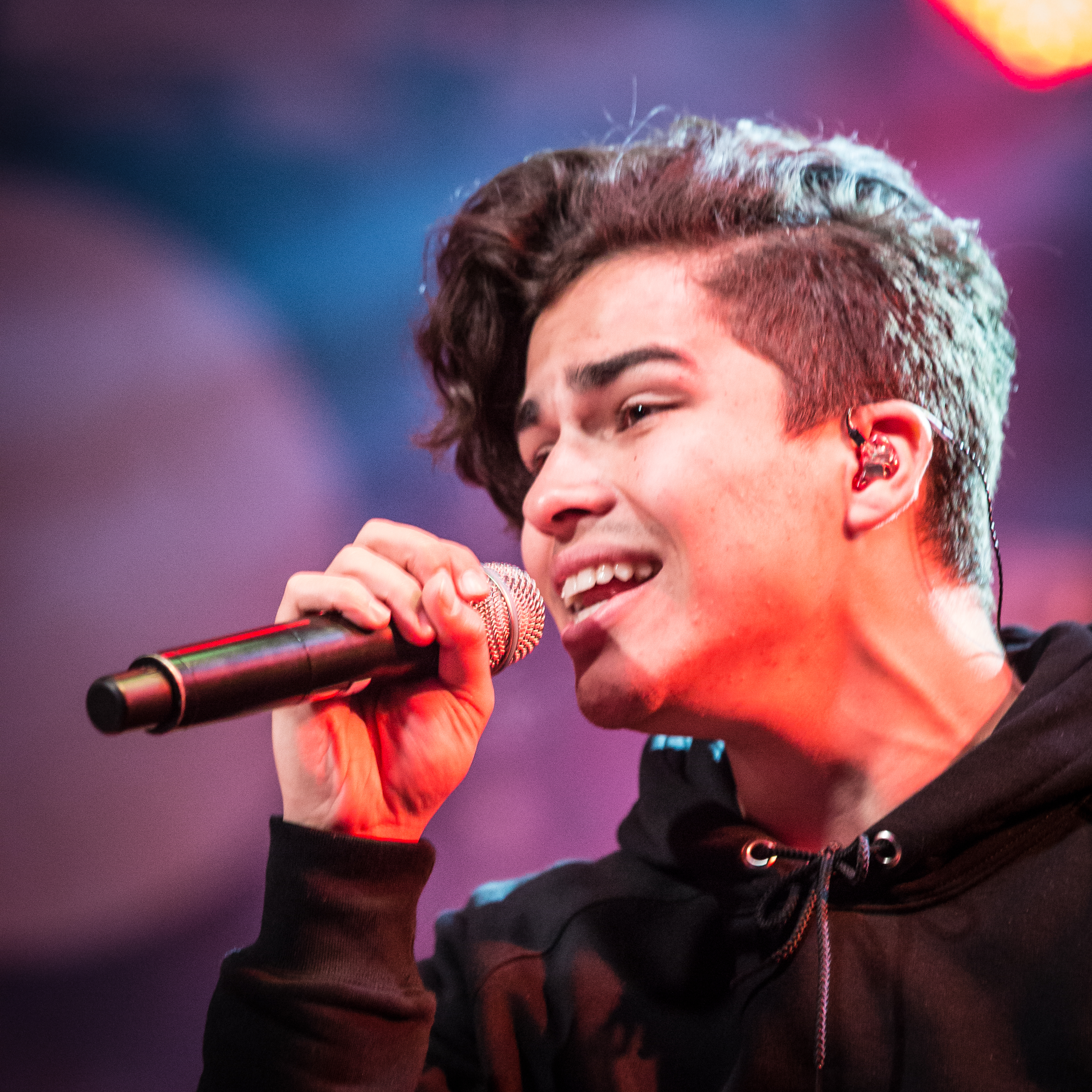
Alex Aiono in 2017

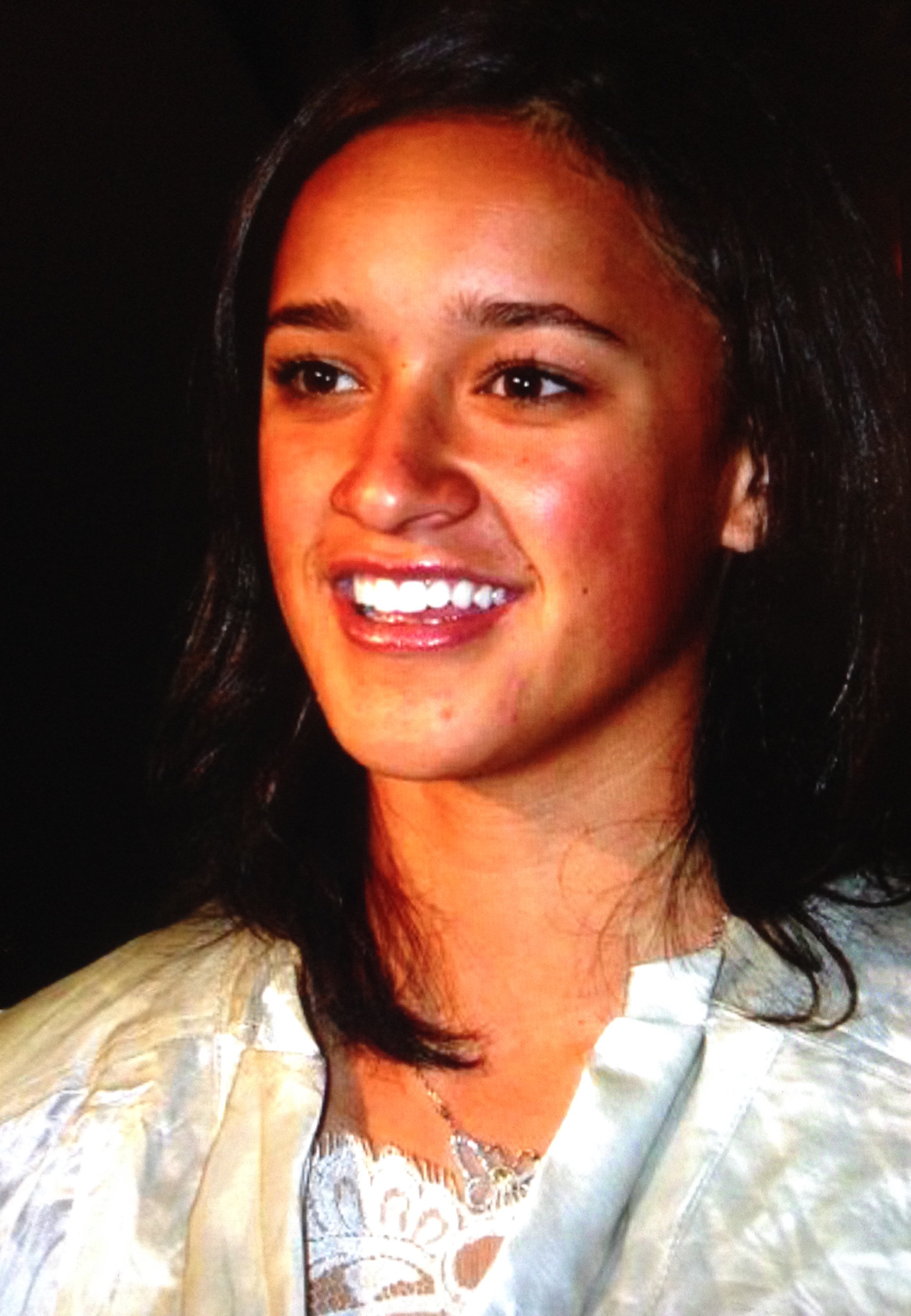
Keisha Castle-Hughes in 2019

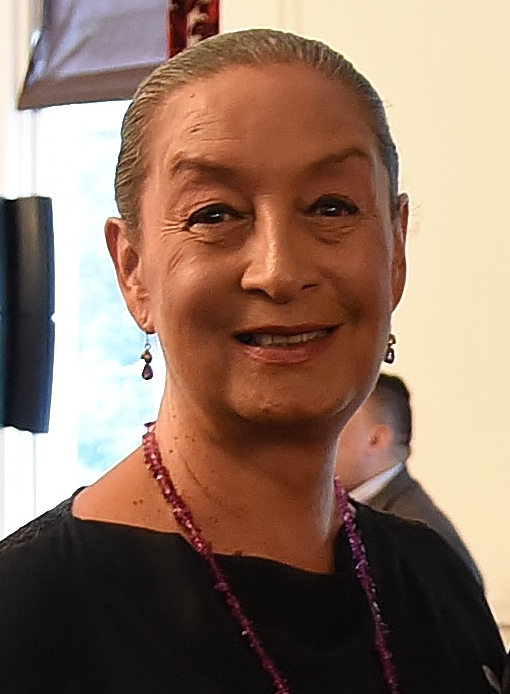
Georgina Beyer 2018

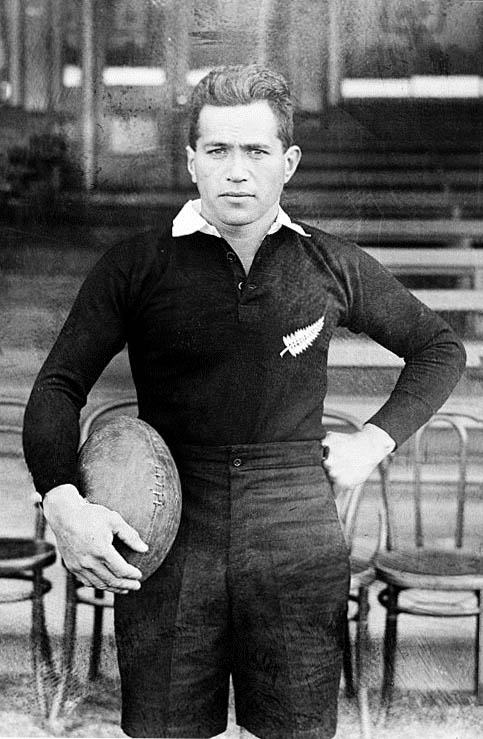
George Nēpia 1935

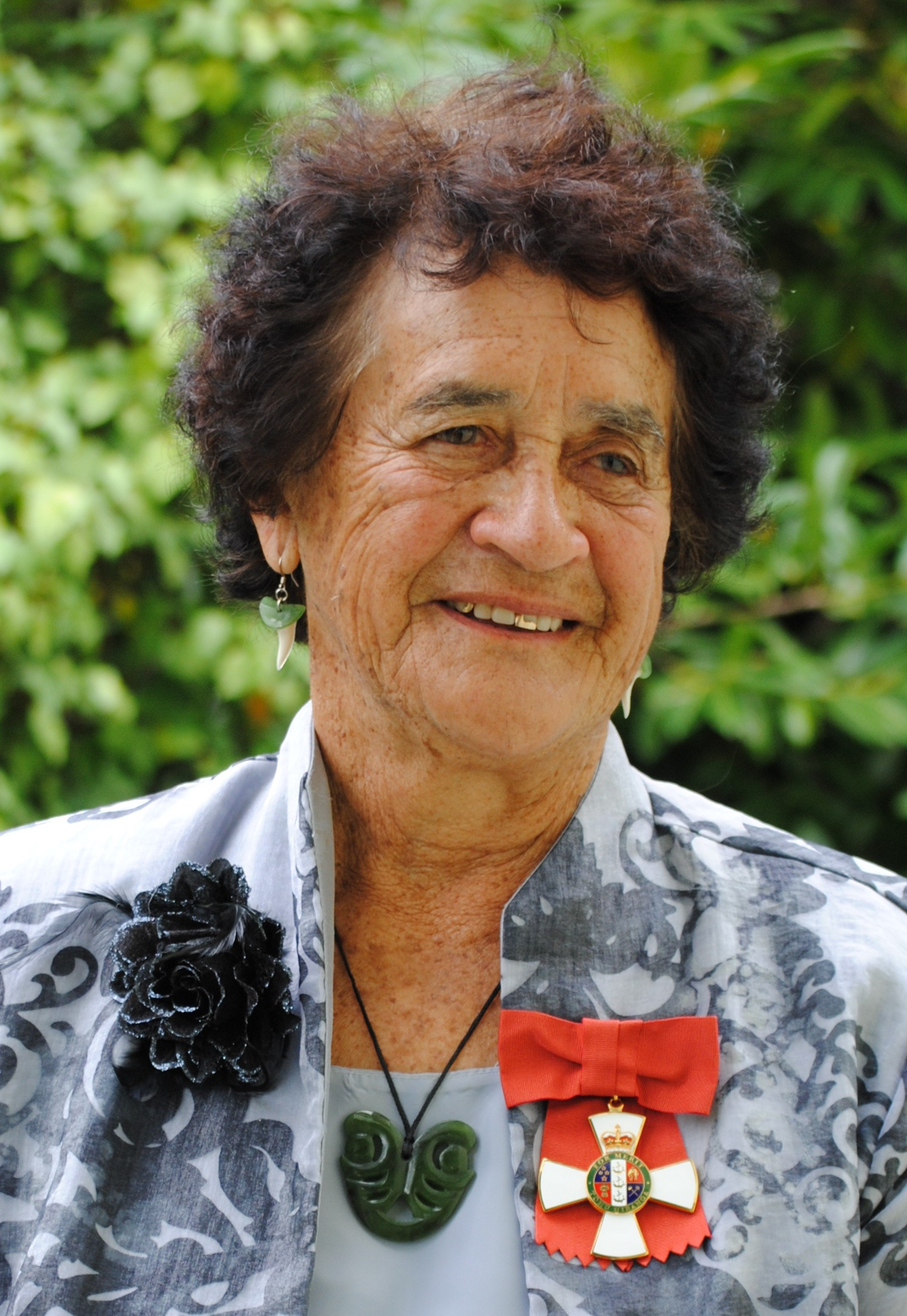
Iritana Tawhiwhirangi DNZM
