= Patricia Te Arapo Wallace =

New Zealand academic

Patricia Te Arapo Wallace is a New Zealand academic specialising in Māori traditional textiles. Of Ngāti Porou descent, she is currently a research associate at the University of Canterbury.

Wallace's PhD thesis, Traditional Maori dress : rediscovering forgotten elements of pre-1820 practice, examined the practises of textile production from the early contact period, based on an examination of artefacts in museums in New Zealand, the UK and America. This is in contrast to traditional practises in Māori textile crafts in which knowledge is developed and transmitted on the apprenticeship or teacher-student model.

During her time as a student at the University of Canterbury she established pa harakeke (plantings of harakeke for weaving use) on campus.

Wallace also edits the Te Roopu Raranga Whatu o Aotearoa national newsletter and travels regularly to grow the understanding of Māori textile crafts.

== Selected works ==
- Awhina Tamarapa and Patricia Wallace, 'Māori clothing and adornment – kākahu Māori', Te Ara - the Encyclopedia of New Zealand, (accessed 29 April 2020)
- Wallace P. (2006) Traditional Maori dress: recovery of a seventeenth century style. Pacific Arts: the Journal of the Pacific Arts Association 1: 54–64.
- Wallace P. (2003) Puawaitanga o te Ringa: Fruits of our busy hands. Christchurch: Christchurch City Libraries. 28pp.
