= Megan Tamati-Quennell =

New Zealand art curator

Megan Tamati-Quennell CNZM
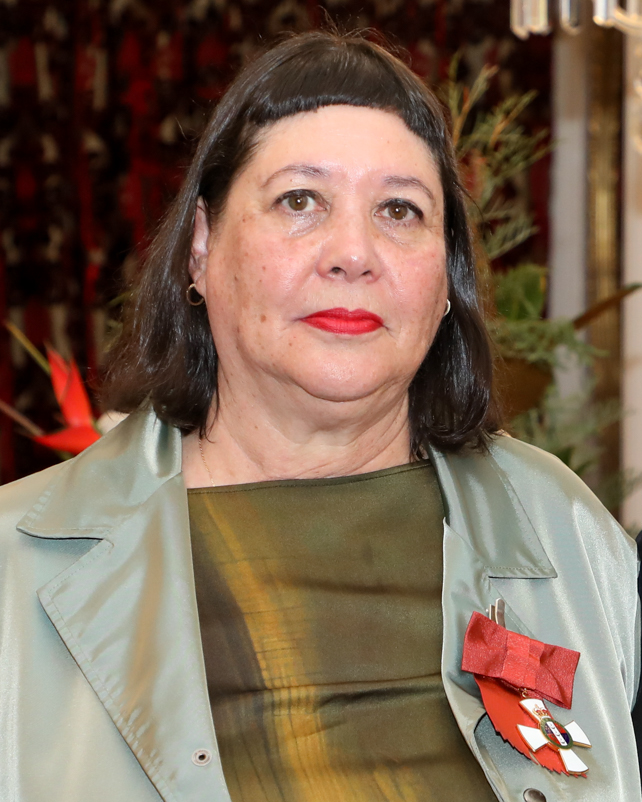
- Tamati-Quennell in 2025
- Born: Dunedin, New Zealand
- Occupation: Art curator
- Employer(s): National Art Gallery, Te Papa Tongarewa, Govett Brewster Art Gallery, Sharjah Art Foundation

Megan Faye Tamati-Quennell CNZM is a New Zealand art curator who has specialised in modern and contemporary Māori and indigenous art. In 2024, Tamati-Quennell was appointed a Companion of the New Zealand Order of Merit, for services to Māori and First Nations art.

== Early life and education ==
Tamati-Quennell is Māori, and is affiliated with Te Ātiawa, Ngāti Mutunga, Kāti Māmoe, Ngāi Tahu and Waitaha iwi. She was born in Dunedin.

== Career ==
Tamati-Quennell began her career in journalism, training at the Wellington Polytechnic School of Journalism and graduating in 1983. She worked as a journalist for the Levin Chronicle (now the Horowhenua-Kapiti Chronicle), and the Evening Post in Wellington, before running a training programme for those interested in journalism through the Wellington Unemployed Workers' Union in Wellington. As a young reporter, Tamati-Quennell previewed Te Māori, Te Hokinga Mai, which was formative in her development as a curator. She also worked as a Māori weaver, learning mahi raranga under Diane Prince at the Wellington Arts Centre and Erenora Puketapu-Hetet at Waiwhetū Marae. Other roles before working as an art curator, include working in film, on a first series of Māori drama programmes created for television in the late 1980s - Tipu E Rea - and on Barry Barclay's feature film Te Rua.

Tamati-Quennell began her curatorial career as an intern at the National Art Gallery (now Te Papa Tongarewa) in 1990. Her first exhibition experience was as an assistant curator for Kohia Ko Taikaka Anake, the largest exhibition of contemporary Māori art to be held in New Zealand. Her first solo curated exhibition was Pū Manawa, an exhibition that paid tribute to Māori weavers and looked at the relationship between weavers and contemporary artists. Subsequently, Tamati-Quennell has worked at the Museum of New Zealand Te Papa Tongarewa curating projects for the opening programme of Te Papa under Ian Wedde and Tim Walker and going on to become the inaugural curator of modern and contemporary Māori and indigenous art at Te Papa.

Between 2002 and 2004, Tamati-Quennell took leave to work at the Ngai Tahu Development Corporation as the Ngāi Tahu arts facilitator and curated the exhibition Te Puawai o Ngai Tahu for the opening of the Christchurch Art Gallery in 2003. In 2004, she returned to Te Papa and continued her career as curator of modern and contemporary Māori and indigenous art, and was invited by the 18 Ngāi Tahu papatipu rūnaka to curate Mo Tatou, the Ngai Tahu Whanui exhibition at Te Papa, the first major survey of Ngāi Tahu art both customary and contemporary.

Between 2021 and 2022, Tamati-Quennell worked at the Govett-Brewster Art Gallery in New Plymouth. During her time there, she curated two exhibitions: There is no before in 2021, with indigenous Australian artist, D. Harding; and Swallowing Geography in 2022, with artists Ana Iti, Kate Newby, Matt Pine and Shona Rapira Davies.

Tamati-Quennell has curated numerous exhibitions over her career, the most recent at Te Papa; Hinaki, contemplation of a form (2023–2024), and Hiahia, Whenua, Landscape and Desire (2022–2024).

In 2023, Tamati-Quennell was selected to be one of five curators to curate the 16th Sharjah Biennial, titled to carry, which runs from 6 February to 15 June 2025 in Sharjah in the United Arab Emirates. In 2024, at the invitation of the president of the Sharjah Art Foundation, Hoor Al Qasimi, she curated with Qasimi, Emily Karaka: Ka Awatea: A New Dawn, a major survey show of senior Māori painter Emily Karaka for the Sharjah Art Foundation in Sharjah. Beginning in 2024, Tamati-Quennell began studying for a PhD in fine arts at Monash University in Melbourne, under the supervision of Brian Martin and Jessica Neath.

== Honours and awards ==
In the 2024 Birthday Honours, Tamati-Quennell was appointed a Companion of the New Zealand Order of Merit, for services to Māori and First Nations art.

== Selected works ==
- Megan Tamati-Quennell (13 December 2022). "Introduction to "History and Sovereignty"". Pacific Arts. 22 (2). doi:10.5070/pc222259586. ISSN 1018-4252. Wikidata Q130476451.
- Megan Tamati-Quennell; Lisa Reihana (1 December 2016). "Reverse Notions, Darkness and Light". Public. 27 (54): 66–77. doi:10.1386/public.27.54.66_7. ISSN 0845-4450. Wikidata Q130476450.
- Huhana Smith; Oriwa Solomon; Awhina Tamarapa; Megan Tamati-Quennell (2007), Taiāwhio II: Contemporary Māori Artists (1st ed.), Te Papa Press, Wikidata Q75135656
