= Rangitukia =

Locality in Gisborne District, New Zealand

- Settlement
- Interactive map of Rangitukia
- Coordinates: 37°46′19″S 178°27′31″E
- Country: New Zealand
- Region: Gisborne District
- Ward: Tairāwhiti General Ward
- Electorates: East Cape; Ikaroa-Rāwhiti (Māori)

Government
  - Territorial authority: Gisborne District Council
  - Mayor of Gisborne: Rehette Stoltz
  - East Cape MP: Dana Kirkpatrick
  - Ikaroa-Rāwhiti MP: Cushla Tangaere-Manuel

Area
  - Total: 14.28 km^{2} (5.51 sq mi)

Population (2023 Census)
  - Total: 114
  - Density: 7.98/km^{2} (20.7/sq mi)
- Postcode(s): 4087

Rangitukia is a small settlement 10 kilometres south of East Cape in the northeast of New Zealand's North Island. It is near the mouth of the Waiapu River.

The settlement is an important place in Ngāti Porou and the founding place for Christian missions in the Gisborne District.

The Rangitukia cemetery includes the burial ground of Canon Hone Kaa and former Māori All Black George Nēpia.

Labour Party MP Cushla Tangaere-Manuel is from Rangitukia.

== Demographics ==
Rangitukia locality covers 14.28 km^{2} (5.51 sq mi). It is part of the East Cape statistical area.

The population of the Rangitukia locality was 114 people in the 2023 census. up from 69 in the 2018 census.

== Marae ==
Rangitukia has two marae, belonging to the Ngāti Porou hapū of Ngāi Tāne, Ngāti Hokopū, Ngāti Nua, Te Whānau a Hunaara, Te Whānau a Rerewa and Te Whānau a Takimoana: Hinepare Marae and Te Tairawhiti meeting house, and Ōhinewaiapu Marae and meeting house. In October 2020, the government committed $1,686,254 from the Provincial Growth Fund to upgrade Hinepaare, Ōhinewaiapu and four other Rongowhakaata marae, creating an estimated 41 jobs.

Karuwai Marae and Te Rehu ā Karuwai meeting house, north of Rangitukia at the end of a gravel road, is a meeting place for the Ngāti Porou hapū of Te Whānau a Karuwai and Te Whānau a Karuai. In October 2020, the government committed $5,756,639 from the Provincial Growth Fund to upgrade the marae and 28 other Ngāti Porou marae, creating an estimated 205 jobs.

== Education ==
Te Kura Kaupapa Māori o Tapere-Nui-A-Whatonga is a Year 1–8 co-educational Māori immersion school with a roll of 27 students as of July 2026. The school opened in 1996.
