= Tungia Baker =

New Zealand actress

- Born: Tungia Dorothea Gloria Baker; 8 October 1939; Ōtaki, New Zealand
- Died: 25 July 2005 (aged 65); Ōtaki, New Zealand
- Known for: Contribution to Māori theatre and arts as an actor, organiser and kaumātua

Tungia Dorothea Gloria Baker (8 October 1939 – 25 July 2005) was a New Zealand actor, weaver, and administrator. Her notable acting roles included Ngahuia in the 1980s television drama Open House and Hira in the 1993 film The Piano. Baker was influential in contemporary Māori theatre, Māori film making and Māori arts. She named the Taki Rua Theatre, and was a founding member of Māori artists' collectives Te Manu Aute and Haeata.

== Early life and education ==
The daughter of noted Māori elder and Ngāti Raukawa paramount chief Matenga Baker of Ōtaki, Baker was born on 8 October 1939 in Ōtaki. Her iwi affiliations were Ngāti Raukawa, Ngāti Toa, Te Āti Awa and Te Arawa. She went to the Queen Victoria School for Māori Girls in Auckland where she was head prefect from 1953 to 1957 and dux in 1957 and 1958. She did not learn to speak Māori growing up, as her parents believed it would be better for their children to speak English.

Baker received an American Field Service (AFS) Scholarship in 1958 and she went to West Bend in Wisconsin. She returned to Wellington and studied at Wellington Polytechnic. She later became the first New Zealand National Representative of the American Field Service from 1972 to 1976, pioneering marae visits for incoming AFS scholars.

== Career ==
Baker became invested in contemporary Māori theatre as it was emerging in the 1970s alongside Bruce Stewart, Rowley Habib (Rore Hapipi) and Jim Moriarty. In 1976 Baker was an actor with the newly formed company Te Ika a Maui Players to present the stage production Death of the Land written by Habib. Death of the Land was a courtroom drama about the sale of Māori land, and Baker went on to also act in the television production in 1978 that had footage of the 1975 Māori Land March. These productions were notable at the time as New Zealand stories about Māori issues written by a Māori person and were part of the Māori renaissance. Baker took place in a Maori artists and writers conference (hui) at Toa Rangatira Marae, Porirua in 1978. Baker was a tutor at Wellington Polytechnic in 1979 and realised she wanted to learn Māori language herself. She went to Rotorua for this purpose and learnt on a marae at age 40.

In the 1980s Baker was part of Te Manu Aute, a collective of Māori film-makers who set about to influence screen production in New Zealand. The collective included Barry Barclay, Tama Poata, Merata Mita, Don Selwyn, Annie Keating and Karen Sidney. The collective's philosophy was "Māori are trained by other Māori, in a Māori environment, in Māori projects" to be creating "a stronger Māori presence and voice in the telling of our stories". The current screen advocacy group for Māori, Ngā Aho Whakaari, have acknowledged Baker along with others for their contributions to Māori film makers.

She was also part of the Māori women artist's collective Haeata, which was formed in 1983 around a publishing project called Herstory Diary and had a goal to be "nurturing the talents of new and young Māori women artists". Notably, she was part of an exhibition Karanga Karanga at the City Gallery in Wellington (1986) organised by Haeata. The show was in part a response to Te Māori, a major international exhibition of Māori art that did not include women's arts forms.

Throughout her career, Baker was an advocate for Māori art. In 1984 Baker coordinated the New Zealand component at the fourth South Pacific Festival of Arts in Noumea. She said at the time: "Contemporary Māori art is streaks ahead of the New Zealand art form whatever that is. It has been boiling away for the last 30 years and has crescendos of energy yet to be seen in a Pacific context." In the mid-1980s she oversaw Māori input into a curriculum review at the Department of Education. She was also part of the Wellington Professional Working Party group that in 1994 wrote a report to the Wellington City Council and the Arts Council (Creative New Zealand) recommending that Downstage Theatre become a New Zealand focused theatre as a point of difference to Circa Theatre and that it was "Māori, bicultural, local and new".

Baker was a kaumātua of Taki Rua Theatre and when they changed their name in 1992 as part of a bicultural journey it was Baker who gifted 'Taki Rua' from a weaving expression for 'a pattern of twos', representing "the weaving together of tangata whenua and tauiwi (those from across other waters)". Baker was an influence on younger theatre practitioners including writer Riwia Brown and actor and director Nancy Brunning. Brunning said in 2018:

I thank Tungia Baker, Wi Kuki Kaa, Rona Bailey, Bob Wiki, Rowley Habib, Don Selwyn and Keri Kaa for creating and establishing a Māori theatre industry for us.

In 1993 Baker narrated The Clio Legacy by Dorothy Buchanan and Witi Ihimaera with opera singer Helen Medlyn at the Composing Women's Festival in the Wellington Town Hall. Baker featured on an album recorded by Rattle Records in 1998 called Ipu by Gillian Whitehead with Richard Nunns, Judy Bailey and Georg Pedersen. Whitehead tells of a time when they were making Ipu when Baker gave musician Nunns a Māori rattle instrument she had made as a replica of one from a museum, "another sound came back into the modern world".

Baker had a wide range of creative interests and skills outside of the performing arts. Weaving was one of her skills; she learnt the traditional art of 'raranga harakeke' in Rotorua, and created the tukutuku panels for the marae at Bruce Bay. She worked in radio and was a presenter at the Wellington Māori radio station Te Upoko o Te Ika from 1988 to 1991 including hosting the programme ‘Te Kupenga Kōrero'. Baker recorded the story Mihipeka; Early years (1991) by Mihi Edwards that aired on Radio New Zealand. She was also the producer for television documentary A Whale Out My Window (1996), about the Southern Right whales at Campbell Island in sub-Antarctic. In 2000 she led a workshop at Otago University at a conference 'He Minenga Whakatū Hua o te Ao' at Murihiki Marae called Māori in Science or Science in Māori.

Baker moved to the West Coast of New Zealand to take up a management role at Grey Base Hospital in the 1990s. While based on the West Coast she scripted a play about Ngāi Tahu prophet Te Maiharoa, was involved in community arts and festival initiatives. A sculpture Baker made from driftwood and flax, Kupenga, at the inaugural West Coast Driftwood and Sand competition on Hokitika Beach won an award.

Baker had a Māori korowai cloak presented to her by King Koroki, the Māori King in 1958 as an award for Tungia's achievement as the first Maori female American Field Service scholar. She took this cloak with her to the United States when she was 18, and the cloak has been used on a number of important occasions since, including at the university graduation of her daughter Pearl, at Baker's funeral on her casket and at the funeral of King Koroki's daughter Te Arikinui Dame Te Atairangikaahu at Tūrangawaewae where Baker first received the cloak.

== Memberships and associations ==
- Haeata – the Māori Women’s Collective. Membership included Patricia Grace, Keri Kaa, Robyn Kahukiwa, and Irihapeti Ramsden
- Wellington Professional Theatres Working Party (1994). Other members: Alison Quigan, Fenn Gordon, Jonathan Hendry, Simon Garrett
- Te Manu Aute (1980s) – collective of Māori film-makers.
- Kaumātua of Toi Whakaari: New Zealand Drama School
- Kaumātua of Taki Rua Theatre
- Founding trustee of Project Tohora Trust (non-scientific people developing research on the Southern Right whale in 1997)
- Founding trustee of Puhake Ki Te Rangi (the cultural harvest of stranded whales)
- Raukawa Marae
- Rangiātea Church, Ōtaki
- Coast Health Care

== Filmography ==
Year	Title	Role	Notes	Ref
1978	Death of the Land		Television	
1986	Open House	Ngahuia Mitchell	Television	
1987	Open House	Ngahuia Mitchell	Television	
1993	The Piano	Hira	Feature	
1997	Mirror Mirror	Makareta	Television (2 ep's)	
1998	A Difficult Woman	Arahita Tahanga	Television (3 ep's)	
2003	The Legend of Johnny Lingo	Turtle Island Grandmother	(final film role)	

== Theatre ==
Selected productions include:

Year	Title	Author	Director	Venue	Ref
1976	Death of the Land	Rowley Habib		Unity Theatre, Wellington and other venues	
1990	Te Hara (The Sin)	John Broughton	Anne Keating	Taki Rua Theatre, Wellington	
1992	Wahine Toa	Jan Bolwell (Choreographer)	Keri Kaa; Jan Bolwell; Sunny Amey	Taki Rua Theatre	
1994	Roimata	Riwia Brown	Jim Moriarty	Taki Rua Theatre	
1998	Outrageous Fortune (Opera)	Music by Gillian Whitehead, text by Christine Johnston	Louise Petherbridge	Trust Bank Theatre, Dunedin	

== Personal life and death ==
Baker had four daughters. She died of cancer in Ōtaki on 25 July 2005, and was buried in Rangiātea churchyard.
