= Haeata =

Māori women's arts collective

- Formation: 1983
- Purpose: Initiating projects to support, develop and promote the work of Māori women artists across writing, visual and performance arts
- Location: New Zealand
- Products: Haeata Herstory Diary (1985)
- Key people: Keri Kaa, Patricia Grace, Bub Bridger, Robyn Kahukiwa

The Haeata Māori Women Arts Collective was a Māori women's arts collective that started in Wellington, New Zealand. The name refers to the first shaft of light at dawn.

In 1983 Haeata was formed through an invitation to Irihapeti Ramsden, Miriama Evans and Marian Evans by New Women's Press to produce a Māori 'herstory' publication. Early members included Keri Kaa. In 1985 Haeata received some funding from MASPAC (Māori and South Pacific Arts Council), within the Queen Elizabeth II Arts Council to publish the bilingual women's biographical diary Haeata Herstory Diary, the previous six Herstory Diaries had all been by Pākehā women. The publication featured twenty-eight Māori women aged sixty and over that had been interviewed.

Haeata organised an exhibition Karanga Karanga (1986) at the Wellington City Art Gallery of Māori women's art, as well as similar exhibitions in Gisborne and Auckland. The artists involved in these exhibitions were Tungia Baker, Ani Crawford, Melanie Cullinan, Kōhai Grace, Patricia Grace, Jolie Marianne Gunson, Kataraina Hetet-Winiata, Hinemoa Hilliard, Wendy Howe, Keri Kaa, Robyn Kahukiwa, Maxine Montgomery, Hana Pōmare, Janet Pōtiki, Diane Prince, Eranora Puketapu-Hetet, Veranoa Puketapu-Hetet, Irihapeta Ramsden, Lee Retimana, Mihiata Retimana, Waireti Rolleston, Rea Ropiha, Ngapine Tamihana Te Ao, Raiha Te Hiko Waaka, Stephanie Turner and Grace Warren. The art gallery said of the show:

Karanga Karanga is a milestone show—the first public-museum show of collaborative works by Māori women artists. (City Gallery Wellington Te Whare Toi)

Other exhibition the collective organised included work of Robyn Kahukiwa, and an exhibition called Mana Tiriti in 1990. This was a bicultural partnership with Project Waitangi and Pākehā artists.

Haeata ran book launch events including books by Patricia Grace, Keri Hulme and Robyn Kahukiwa.

Developing talents of new Māori women artists was part of the collective's work. Bub Bridger and Bruce Stewart along with Patricia Grace and Robyn Kahukiwa expanded the membership from writer and poets to artists including weavers, performers and 'composers of traditional and contemporary waiata'. It was a loose structure of membership.

Haeata hosted Indigenous women artists to visit New Zealand including from North America and Australia.

Haeata were also connected to Ngā Puna Waihanga, the Māori Artists and Writers Society that was founded in 1973.
