= Waahine Toa =

Paintings by Robyn Kahukiwa (1979–1983)

Waahine Toa: Women in Maori Myth
- Hinetitama, 1980
- Artist: Robyn Kahukiwa
- Year: 1979–1983
- Medium: Oil on hardboard
- Subject: Eight women in Māori mythology
- Location: Various, including: Te Papa; Te Manawa; private collections

Waahine Toa: Women in Maori Myth is a series of eight oil paintings on hardboard by Robyn Kahukiwa of women from Māori mythology, completed between 1979 and 1983. The exhibition of the series was accompanied by text written by author Patricia Grace. A book of the exhibition artwork and Grace's text was published in 1984 under the title Wahine Toa: Women of Maori Myth.

The series received a mixed contemporary critical response, with its narrative and figurative style seen as unfashionable at the time. It has since come to be regarded as a landmark in New Zealand art. Two paintings from the series, Hinetitama and Taranga, are held in permanent public museum collections; the remaining works are generally held in private collections, and the locations of some have been unknown for long periods.

== Background ==
In the late 1970s, Kahukiwa was working as a teacher and raising her three children, but wished to become a full-time painter. She began working on the series in 1979. After receiving a Maori and South Pacific Arts Council grant in 1982, she left her teaching role and was able to work full time to complete the series in 1983. Her intention was to reclaim the stories of women from Māori mythology.

In the 1980s, the series was exhibited first at the Bowen Galleries in Wellington under the title Works from Maori Myth, then toured New Zealand as Waahine Toa: Women in Maori Myth. Hosting galleries included the Wairarapa Arts Centre in Masterton, the Rotorua Art Gallery and the Robert McDougall Art Gallery in Christchurch. In addition to paintings, the exhibition included Kahukiwa's drawings and engravings.

The series exhibition was accompanied by text written by author Patricia Grace. The text was an integral part of the series' reclamation of Māori myth. The artworks and text were subsequently published together in a book, Waahine Toa: Women of Maori Myth in 1984. Kahukiwa dedicated the book to her ancestor Ruataupare.

== Themes and style ==
The paintings represent Te Pō (the personification of night and death), Papatūānuku (earth mother), Hineahuone (the first woman, formed from clay), Hinetitama (dawn, the daughter of Hineahuone), Taranga (the mother of Māui), Mahuika (fire goddess), Muriranga-Whenua (the grandmother of Māui) and Hine-nui-te-pō (the goddess of death).

Kahukiwa's style is bicultural, using a mixture of elements from Māori traditional design and symbolism (including carving, tukutuku patterns, weaving, and East Coast marae decoration), together with the women being painted in a Western or European representational style. Her style was described at the time as naïve art, with the introduction to the exhibition noting that "her approach is instinctive rather than academic".

== Individual paintings ==
=== Hinetitama ===
Hinetitama was painted in 1980, and depicts Hinetitama, the daughter of Tāne and Hineahuone, in the moment of transitioning to Hine-nui-te-pō (the goddess of death) after discovering that Tāne was her father as well as her husband. It is held in the permanent collection of Te Manawa, in Palmerston North.

=== Taranga ===
Taranga was painted in 1982 and is held in the permanent collection of Te Papa, New Zealand's national museum. It depicts Taranga giving birth prematurely to Māui, her abandonment of him, and their later reunion.

== Reception and cultural impact ==
Art historian Jonathan Mane-Wheoki described the contemporary reception of the series as "mixed", with its naïve and narrative or illustrative style being unfashionable in New Zealand art at the time. A 1984 review in The Press said the series was an "interesting and challenging undertaking ... to redress the gender imbalance in Maori mythology". It concluded, however, that the series did not successfully convey a sense of female strength because her paintings "are compositionally confusing" due to combining "traditional Maori design with other picturing techniques".

The series has nevertheless had lasting cultural impact in New Zealand; Mane-Wheoki observes that several of the paintings "have registered themselves in the public consciousness" and the book of the exhibition has "become a classic of New Zealand publishing". He also describes the paintings as being "icons" in New Zealand's national art canon. Hinemoa Hilliard comments that the series "expanded the accepted roles for women as lover, mother, nurturer and matriarch to include qualities and dimensions more usually assigned to men: powerful, authoritative and challenging".

The title of the series was suggested by Hohipene (Sophie) Kaa, mother of Keri Kaa. It was controversial at the time, as some Māori men objected to the association of toa (warrior) with women. However, the term has since become a common part of the New Zealand English vocabulary as a way to describe strong female leaders.

The series "launched Kahukiwa's career as a serious, professional artist", according to Mane-Wheoki; she followed it with other ambitious works and series like Nga Whakatauaki (1984) and Whakamamae (1984).

== Later developments ==
The exhibition book has been frequently republished. The 1991 Viking Pacific edition was described by The Press as "a rich celebration, in words and pictures, of Maori mythology". Another new edition was published in 2000 by Penguin Books; The Press praised both Kahukiwa's art and Grace's words, calling it "taonga tuku iho na nga tipuna (a cultural heritage from our ancestors)", although noted that unfortunately the reading list had not been updated for the new edition.

In 2018, a bilingual edition was published by Te Tākupu, the publishing arm of Te Wānanga o Raukawa, under the title Wāhine Toa: Omniscient Māori Women and with the Māori translation by Hēni Jacob.

From 2011 to 2013, Hinetitama was included in an international tour called Standing Strong to Paris, Mexico and Quebec, and was viewed by an estimated 340,000 people before returning to Te Manawa.

In January 2024, the New Zealand Portrait Gallery and Te Manawa sought to find three of the paintings (Hinenuitepō, Hineahuone, and Mahuika), as well as other drawings and paintings by Kahukiwa, in order to include them in an exhibition. The location of the paintings was unknown, although they were thought to be held in private collections. At least some of the works were found in time for the exhibition, including Mahuika which was found in the library of a Wellington college.
