= Mihi Edwards =

New Zealand writer, social worker and teacher (1918–2008)

- Born: Mihipeka-Rukuhia Anne Davis; 19 January 1918; Maketu, New Zealand
- Died: 20 May 2008 (aged 90); Wellington, New Zealand
- Other name: Anne Davis
- Occupations: Writer; social worker; teacher
- Notable work: Mihipeka: Early Years (1990); Mihipeka: Time of Turmoil (1992)
- Spouse: Locksley Edwards (m. 1950)
- Children: 3

Mihipeka-Rukuhia Anne Edwards (née Davis; 19 January 1918 – 20 May 2008) was a New Zealand writer, social worker, teacher and kaumātua (respected Māori elder). Born in Maketu, Edwards was raised largely by her grandparents until their deaths when she was 16. For many years she lived under the Pākehā (New Zealand European) name of Anne Davis and considered herself to be living "as a Pākehā"; it was not until the 1960s that she reconnected with her Māori heritage and culture. In later life she advocated for the Māori language and Māori culture, and taught in schools and institutions. At the age of 70 she began writing her memoirs, which were published in three volumes.

== Life and career ==
Edwards was born in Maketu on 19 January 1918. Her mother died three weeks after she was born during the influenza pandemic that year. She was descended from the iwi (tribes) of Te Arawa, Waikato, Ngāti Raukawa and Ngāti Maniapoto. She had a Pākehā (New Zealand European) grandfather and her great-grandfather was William Fitzherbert. Her father was a flax worker, and she was looked after by her older sisters until she was five and sent to live in Manakau under the care of her grandmother and step-grandfather. She learned to speak English after starting school at age six, and after having been punished for speaking Māori. Her grandparents died when she was 16.

Rejecting family plans for her marriage, she moved to Ōtaki and subsequently to Palmerston North where she worked as a domestic worker. Due to discrimination against Māori at the time, she began living under the Pākehā name of Anne in order to make it easier to get work and accommodation. She would later write: "Mihipeka, my real name. My Maori name given to me at birth, a name to be carried on. I am supposed to be proud of it. Instead I hate it, because Pakeha people used to tease me about it."

Edwards moved to Wellington before the outset of World War II, where she joined the Ngāti Pōneke club. A short marriage around this time ended when her husband left for the war. During the war she worked as a munitions worker, making army uniforms and in various hospital and factory roles. In 1950, she married Locksley Edwards, a mechanic in the air force, and they had three children. During their marriage she became a qualified early childhood educator, and established a childcare centre. Despite her membership of Ngāti Pōneke, she described herself in later life as having lived as a Pākehā for three decades, having learned to hide her Māori identity.

Edwards returned to her Māori heritage in the 1960s through working with the Māori Battalion Welfare Fund. In the 1970s and 1980s, she helped establish a Māori cultural club, became a kōhanga reo teacher and contributed to church and cultural groups including by serving on the advisory board of The Salvation Army. She campaigned in particular against the abuse of alcohol, and in 1975, participated in the Māori land march. She promoted and introduced the teaching of the Māori language and traditions in various institutions including the Department of Health, and taught in various schools and at Victoria University of Wellington. In the 1990s she acted as a kaumātua for the Family Planning Association.

== Memoirs ==
In 1988, at the age of 70, Edwards began writing the first volume of her memoirs, retelling her life from childhood to World War II. It was published as Mihipeka: Early Years in 1990. The sequel, Mihipeka: Time of Turmoil, was published in 1992. Together these books sold over 12,000 copies, and extracts from the first volume were recorded by Tungia Baker and aired on Radio New Zealand. Mary Varnham, publisher, names the first as her favourite New Zealand book, and reviewer David Verran for the Sunday Star-Times noted that it contained "positive down-to-earth teachings about Maori traditions, customs and spirituality", in addition to recording Edwards' difficult early life experiences. It opens:

I wanted to write about how the Maori people lost the language, to let it be known how it really did happen. I made a vow in my heart that one day I would tell it from every point, every pinnacle, every roof top, so that there would be no more misunderstanding. I would let people know how important it is to hold fast to your identity, because without your reo [Maori language] you are nothing.

Edwards completed her memoirs with her third book, Mihipeka, Call of an Elder, Karanga a te Kuia, published in 2002. Verran noted that it was in less of a straightforward narrative style than her earlier books, and at its best when "continuing the story of her involvement with kōhanga reo, recognising the limits of old age and discussing her development as a kaumātua, an authority in the rituals of the karanga and an author". Edwards died on 20 May 2008 and was buried near her Te Arawa grandfather's grave at the Church of the Immaculate Conception in Ngongotahā.
