= Rarohenga =

Subterranean realm in Māori oral tradition

Rarohenga is the subterranean realm where spirits of the deceased dwell after death, according to Māori oral tradition. The underworld is ruled by Hine-nui-te-pō, the goddess of death and night. Additional occupants include guardians, gods, goddesses, holy chiefs and nobles (rangatira), and the tūrehu, who are described as celestial, fairy-like people. Rarohenga is predominantly depicted as a place of peace and light. As articulated by Māori ethnographer Elsdon Best: It is a place where darkness is unknown. "This is the reason why, of all spirits of the dead since the time of Hine-ahuone..., not a single one has ever returned hither to dwell in this world".

In contemporary Māori society, Rarohenga continues to hold a collective, cultural significance. This is a result of several prominent rituals that originate from the underworld, that are still commonly practiced today. This includes facial tattooing (ta moko), finger twining (taniko), tribal woodcarving (moko whakatara), and the art of weaving (raranga). It is recorded that these art forms were first introduced to the human world by figures who travelled into Rarohenga and were bestowed with the sacred techniques to improve the secular world.

Contemporary texts suggest that traditional records and accounts of Māori mythological sites, like Rarohenga, experienced substantial modification to accommodate the dominant missionary scriptures that were introduced during 19th century colonisation of New Zealand. It is argued that these alterations occurred during translation by non-Māori authors, resulting in variations of Māori mythology to be extremely common. The geography of Rarohenga incorporates several different non-physical, immaterial locations that are recorded in myth. There are also several material locations scattered across both the North and South Islands of New Zealand.

== Cultural significance of Rarohenga ==
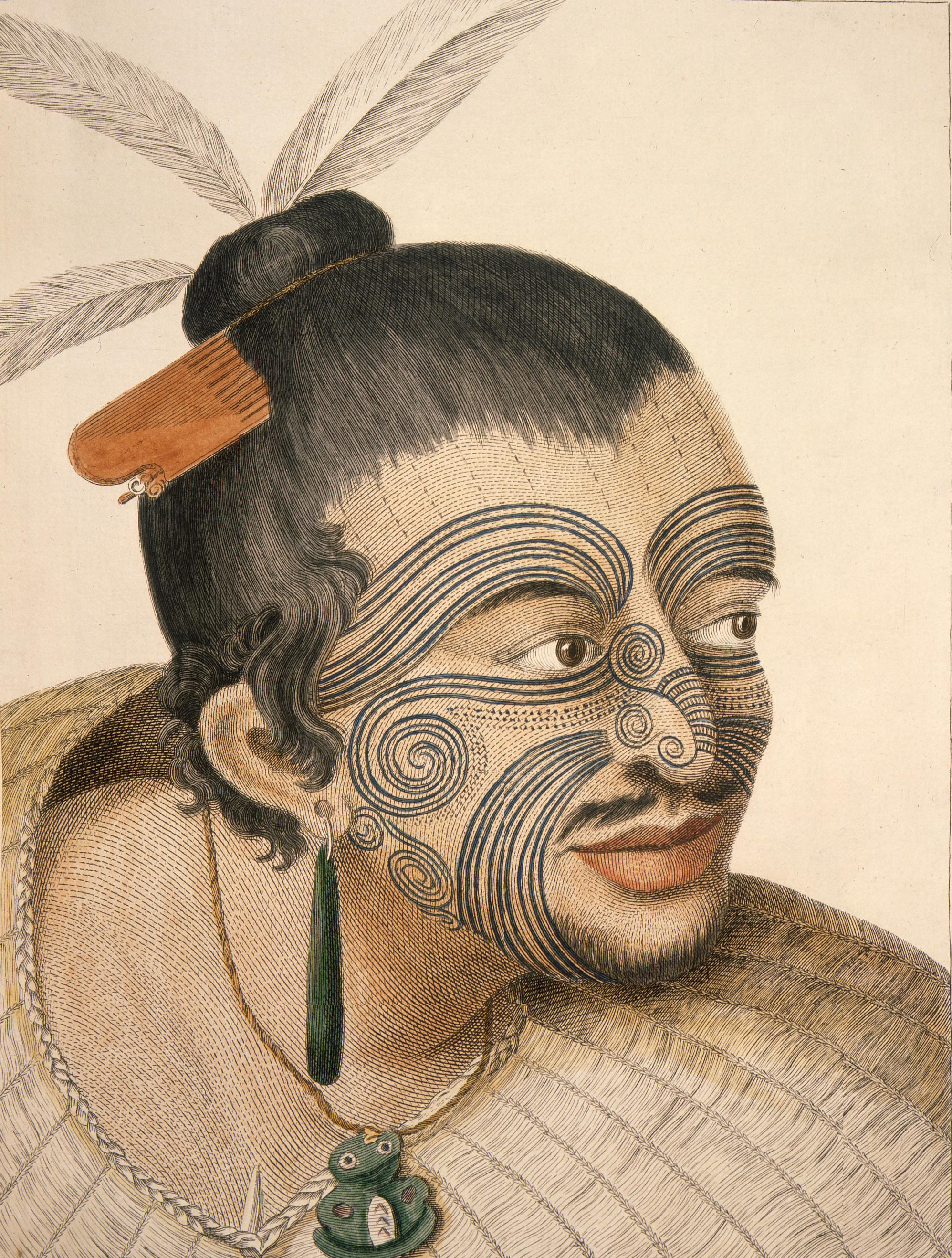
Portrait of a Māori man with a full facial moko. Hand-colored engraving by Thomas Chambers after original artwork by Sydney Parkinson in 1769. Alexander Turnbull Library.

According to the traditional Māori mythology, the art of carving, weaving, and tattooing were not born of the human world. It was only through the "heroes" that climbed into the heavens or descended into Rarohenga, that humanity would learn the now honoured, cultural practices. In 'The Lore of the Warewananga' (1913), the translated teachings of two distinguished Tohunga, state how the generous offerings of celestial wisdom represent the tender connection of the Māori to this spiritual world. This conveys the deep significance of Rarohenga and its apparent influence on the quintessential Māori identity and culture observed today. In the folklore, Māori culture is continuously inundated with different forms of enlightenment from Rarohenga. The incentive of these acts was to develop and elevate the human experience "through ethical behaviour and creative enterprise". This is represented in the myth of Mataora, as the story emphasises the importance of the underworld's Gods and spirits (atua) to modern Māori culture.

=== Tā Moko ===
The tā moko (or 'kauae' for women) is a sacred facial tattoo still frequently practiced in Māori society. Its name is derived from the mythological figure 'Atua Rūaumoko' – the latest child of Ranginui et Papatūānuku of Rarohenga. The origin of the art is recorded in several variations. However, its conception is most commonly regarded as derivative of the Mataora myth. In this famous legend, the wisdom and knowledge of the permanent tattoo (tā moko) was gifted to humankind by the celestial Rangatira, Uetonga. It is explained that up until that point, Māori civilisation had only practiced the application of temporary tattoo. This was known as 'hopara makaurangi', and was achieved with soot, blue clay or red ochre. Uetonga would explain to Mataora the "worthlessness" of his temporary tattoo by wiping his hand across it and embarrassing Mataora by declaring it had no "mana" – meaning no honour, prestige, or authority. Mataora would then beg for the permanent tattoo, so he could bring such insight to the human world. Uetonga agreed and taught Mataora the underworld's design of the nostrils (pōngiangia), the line tattooing of the eyebrows (tīwhana), the designs encompassing the mouth (pīhere), and the upper part of the nose (ngu). In result, when Mataora returned from the underworld he would incite the national spread of the practice across the North and South Islands.

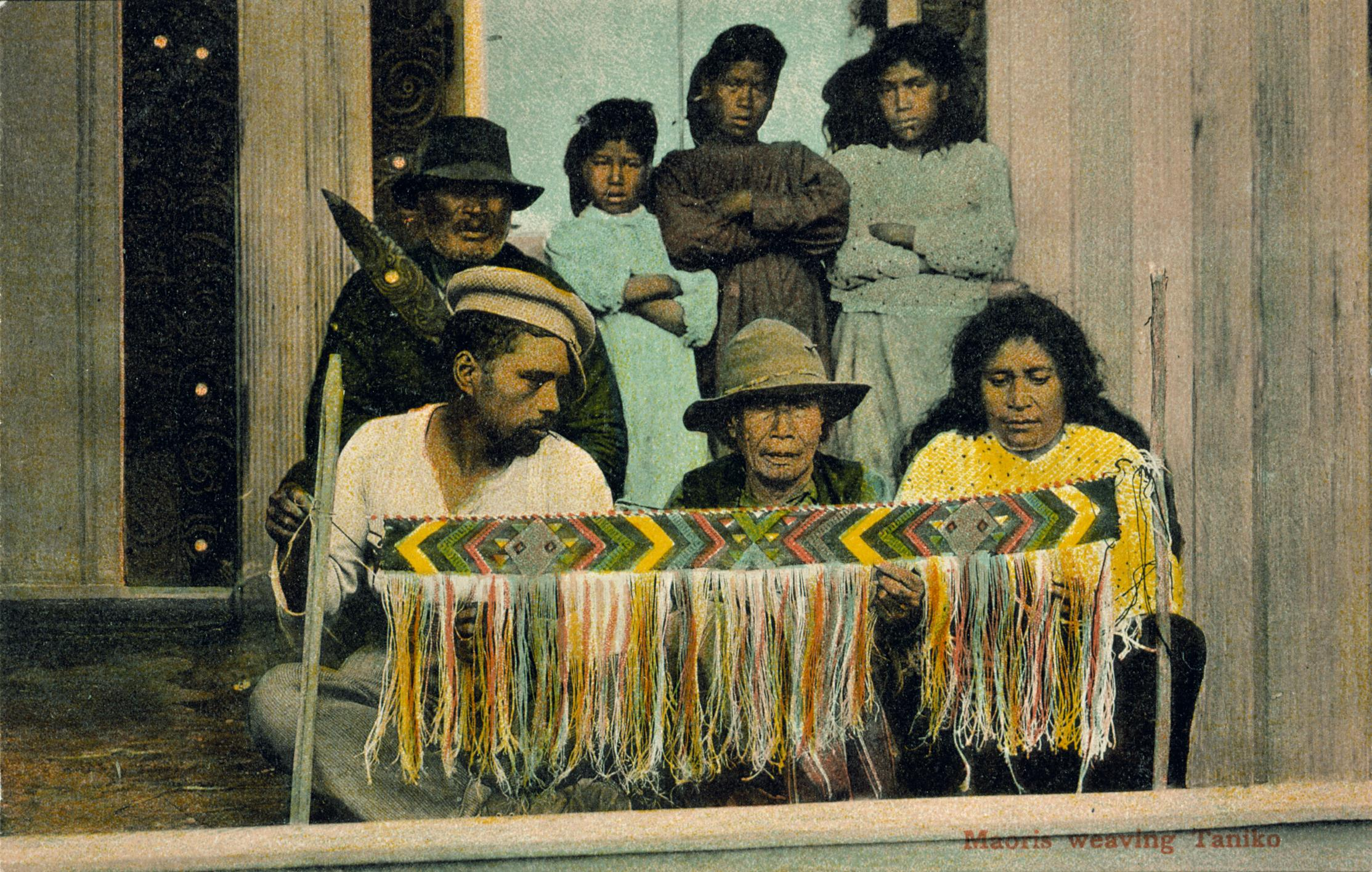
Postcard. Māori people weaving tāniko. Copyright T. Pringle, Wellington, NZ (ca 1904). National Library, New Zealand.

=== Weaving, ornamental patterns, and finger-twining ===
Like the tā moko, the art of weaving was another artistic gift received from Rarohenga. This gift came in the form of a cloak called 'Te Rangi-Hau-Papa'. Its original creator was Hine-rau-wharangi (the daughter of Hine-nui-te-po and Tāne), who would provide the pattern to Niwareka, who would then create it for humanity. The cloak itself was developed primarily as a replacement and "consummation of Mataora's acceptance of tattoo from the underworld" to substitute the now obsolete artform of the painted 'tā moko' in the human world. Ornamental patterns and finger-twinning were also acquired from Mataora's time in Rarohenga, and would too circulate heavily into Māori culture, art, and design.

=== Tribal woodcarving ===
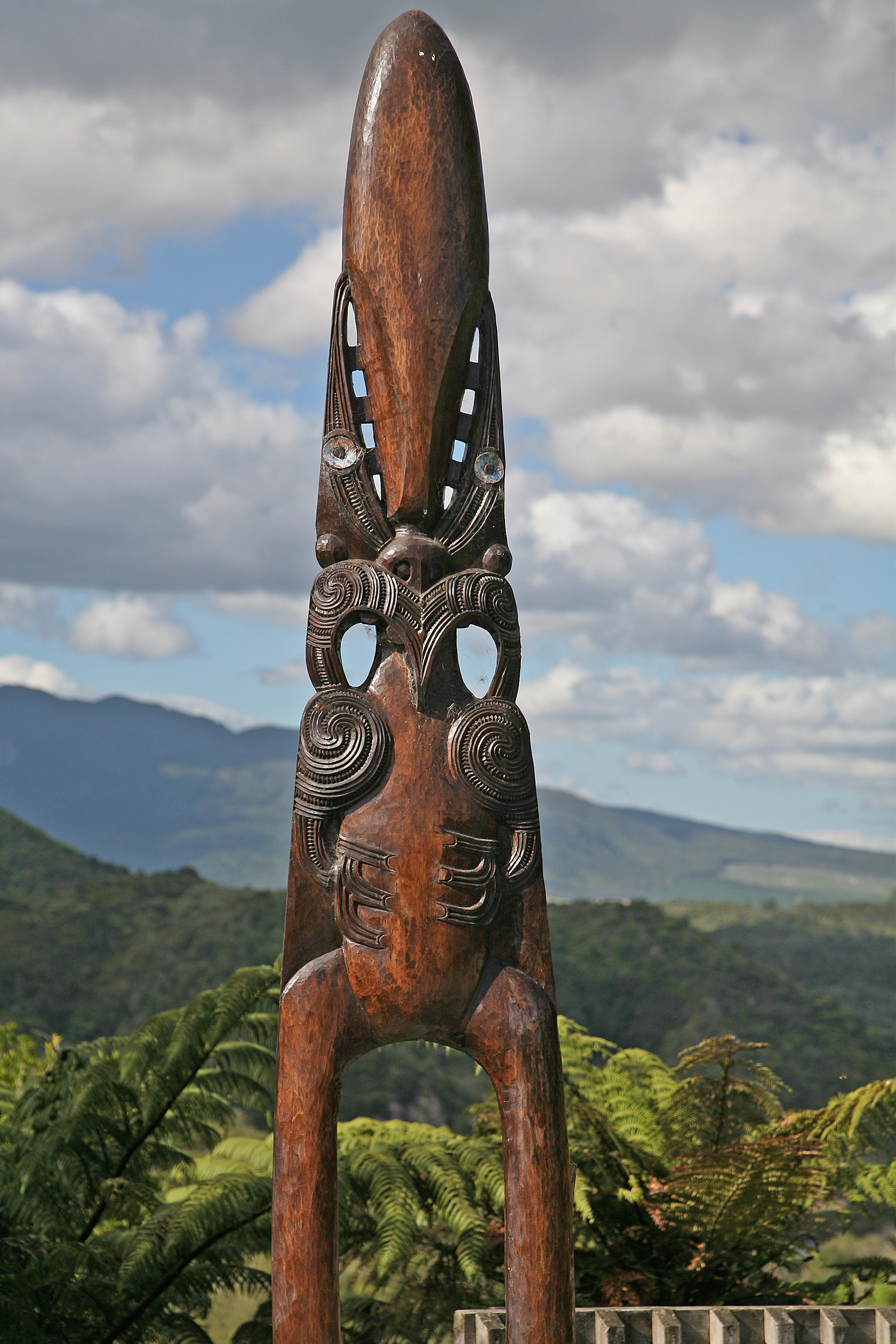
Tribal woodcarving in Waimangu Volcanic Valley, New Zealand in 2009.

Although the narrative of 'Ruatepupuke' is the most commonly accepted origin story of tribal woodcarving (whakairo) – Māori ethnographer Elsdon Best's translations of the Mataora myth suggest the influence of Rarohenga's entities in the cultural and artistic development of woodcarving practiced today. Uetonga reiterated to Mataora the necessary adaption of painting and "carving". His insight expressed that the temporary tattoo seen on Mataora's face, should be used for woodcarving and design found in buildings.

== Myth and origin ==
=== Origin ===
The origin of Rarohenga, like many other Māori rituals and beliefs, is derivative of Polynesian mythology. According to such mythology, Hawaiki represents the origin of all Polynesian people and where they return after death. Variations, such as Rarohenga, came to be after this traditional mythology dispersed across the numerous islands of the central and southern Pacific Ocean, whereupon it was adapted and redeveloped into new settings.

=== Pre-European ===
Prior to colonisation, the "innate belief in the immortality of the soul" held by the Māori was directed into the belief of Rarohenga. Unlike the biblical systems of heaven and hell, the underworld and its key spiritual figures were not characterised as evil and malevolent beings. Rather they were embodied as instigators of positive, cultural development. These mythical entities are recorded as cultivators of humankind through spiritual intervention. Who regularly conducted humanitarian acts of sharing knowledge and wisdom, as the realm and its inhabitants did not seek to punish or disturb the dead. Traditional accounts of Rarohenga characterise its two realms (Upper or Lower) as both being restful places of peace and light, where the ultimate destination and residence of each spirit is entirely up to them. Each individual spirit is said to retain the executive agency to decide to make their home in Rarohenga or The Sky World (also known as The Summit of the Heavens or Toi-o-ngā-rangi). However, the Sky World or The Summit of Heavens is not as widely known or recorded as Rarohenga in traditional accounts.

=== Post-colonisation ===
When examining the mythology of Rarohenga, it is common for inconsistencies to arise between the oral stories, written accounts, and contemporary knowledge. This is the result of 19th century colonisation in New Zealand that allowed the solely oral history, tradition, and mythology of the Māori to become susceptible to erasure through unqualified translation, ethnocentrism, and assimilative motivations of colonisers. Various critics argue the inconsistencies are derivative of translators who would freely translate Māori to English and rewrite substantial passages. Herbert Williams commented on this action, in reference to the famous Māori translator John White, as an academic act of "unpardonable recklessness".

As stated by Māori ethnographer Elsden Best: "Māori folk adapted the myths and teachings of Christianity. This is where ideas of the spirits of the evil person going to the underworld, and those good ascending to the heavens, crept into statements. Such beliefs were unbeknown to the Māori in pre-missionary days".

This "transcultural interlocution" can be witnessed when examining the historical works of writers such as S. Percy Smith. Smith recorded that spirits who conducted evil would be eternally punished and presided over by malicious spirits (Whiro-te-tipua) in Rarohenga. Whereas the "good" spirits would ascend to the mountain of 'Tawhiti-nui' and enter a realm of eternal reward.

Critics such as Jahnke argue this as an example of cultural accommodation and assimilation to the Eurocentric belief of the afterlife that divides souls as good or evil. Critic Buck too maintains this is a loss of "cultural integrity", where the translation of oral history and culture has been destroyed by Western influence: "The cosmogony of separating life from darkness... appears to have been post European additions made after the knowledge was acquired of the biblical story of 'Creation'. The separation of the spirits through the East door to ascend to the supernatural realms, and the 'sinners' through the South door to the underworld is contrary to the Māori and Polynesian concepts of the future world".

== Primary deities ==
Within Rarohenga, several Guardians, Gods and Goddesses have been recorded to occupy the realm. This includes:

Primary Deity	Description
Hinenuitepō	Hinenuitepō is one of the most well-known mythical figures of Rarohenga. She is the controller of human fate and destiny in death. She is also referred to as Hine-tītama or 'The Dawn Maid', which was her identity before fleeing to the underworld upon finding out her husband Tāne was also her father.
Makeatutara	Makeatutara is the father of Māui and executive Guardian of the Underworld. Makeatutara is acknowledged for making humankind mortal.
Uetonga	Uetonga is recognised as the celestial Chief or Noble, who gifted man with the wisdom and knowledge of the permanent tattoo and other significant artforms.
Niwareka	Niwareka is recorded as a 'tūrehu' (fairy-like individual), the daughter of Uetonga and the wife of Mataora. Niwareka would lead Mataora into Rarohenga after Mataora struck her during a disagreement, where he would discover the artistry of tattoo and weaving.
Te Kuwatawata	Te Kuwatawata is the Guardian who holds the entrance to the underworld of the spirits at Poutere-rangi.
Tiwaiwaka	Tīwaiwaka is the Guardian of the base of the spirits ascent.
Whiro	Whiro is regarded as the personified form of darkness, evil, and death who dwells in the underworld.

== Geography ==
The Māori hold a deep connection to the land (whenua), which is evident in the continued, spiritual significance of real-world locations because of their role in the soul's journey to Rarohenga.

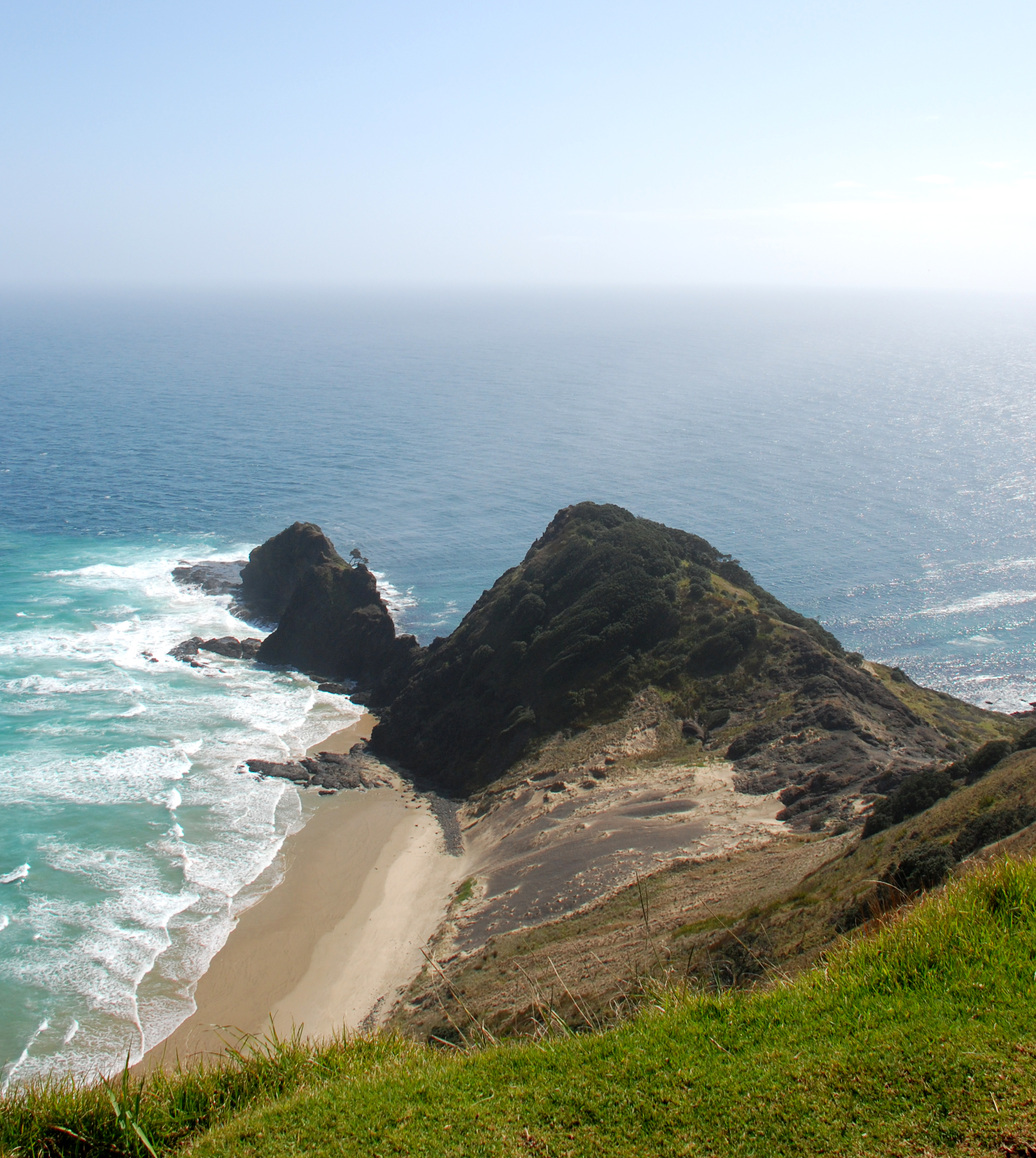
Cape Reinga

Cape Reinga (Te Rerenga Wairua) is one of the most well-known spiritual sites in New Zealand. Mythology proposes that here the spirit descends into the underworld by sliding down the root of a tree into the sea. The spirit then travels underwater to the Three Kings Islands, where they climb the highest point of the island and bid their last goodbye to the human world.

Explorer, Māori scholar and interpreter, Edward Shortland describes this location as a place where the spirit arrives at two hills after travelling northward. These hills are 'Wai-hokimai' and 'Wai-otioti', where the spirit strips off its worldly clothes, and finally turn its back on the land of the living. Shortland states, "there are two long straight roots, the lower extremities of which are concealed in the sea, while the upper ends cling to a pohutukawa tree. The spirit stands by the upper end of these roots, awaiting an opening in the seaweed floating on the water. The moment an opening is seen, it flies down to the Reinga. Reaching the Reinga, there is a river and a sandy beach. The spirit crosses the river. The name of the newcomer is shouted out. He is welcomed, and food is set before him. If he eats the food, he can never return to life" . Additionally, there are several immaterial sites that are central to the geography of Rarohenga. This includes checkpoints such as Pou-tere-rangi, which is described as the Guard House and entry to the underworld. This site is manned by Te Ku-Watawata, and divides Rarohenga to humankind. Original texts express that humans were once able to journey through this point and between worlds. However, after a heated disagreement between Te Ku-Watawata and Mataora, the passage was closed to humans forever. Te Ku-Watawata declared "never again will the door of the lower world be opened to the upper world, but only downward to the underworld; only spirits shall traverse both realms".

== See also ==
- Māori Culture
- Māori Mythology
- Māori Religion
- List of Māori Deities
