= Potiki =

1986 novel by Patricia Grace

- Cover, 1986 edition
- Author: Patricia Grace
- Language: English and te reo Māori
- Publisher: Penguin Books New Zealand (1st edition)
- Publication date: 1986
- Publication place: New Zealand
- ISBN: 9780670810550 (1st edition)

Potiki is a novel by New Zealand author Patricia Grace. First published in 1986, the book is a significant work in contemporary Māori literature, and explores themes of cultural identity, land rights, and the impacts of urban development on indigenous communities. It was critically and commercially successful, and received the New Zealand Book Award for Fiction in 1987. It was published during the Māori renaissance, a period of time in which Māori culture and language was experiencing a revitalisation, and academics have described it as being part of that movement.

Due to its themes of Māori resistance to colonialisation, the novel was viewed by some critics as political, although Grace has said that her intention was to write about people living ordinary lives. It was unusual for its time in not including an English glossary of te reo Māori (Māori language) words, on the basis that Grace did not want Māori to be "treated as a foreign language in its own country".

== Background ==
In 1985, Patricia Grace received a writing fellowship at Victoria University of Wellington, which enabled her to give up teaching, become a full-time writer, and complete Potiki. It was her second novel, following Mutuwhenua: The Moon Sleeps (1978).

The novel is set in a coastal community resembling Hongoeka, Grace's hometown, which is north of Wellington, New Zealand. Although the characters in the novel are fictional, Grace was influenced by the real-life attempts of private developers to acquire land at Hongoeka since the 1950s. On her writing process, Grace has said:

When I started Potiki I thought I was writing a short story. I wrote the story about the carved meeting house, and when I finished that I thought if we have a meeting house there are people who belong to that meeting house. I asked myself who they might be. I started off with one character – that was Roimata – and how she came to be there, in that community. And then her children one by one, and her husband. I didn't know from one chapter to the next what was going to happen – I was just following.

Grace initially wrote the novel in longhand, then "cut it up and stuck it back together with sellotape — the real cut and paste", then typed up the work on a portable typewriter. On taking up the fellowship at Victoria she had access to a computer and was able to complete the manuscript using it.

== Plot summary ==
The novel tells the story of a Māori family's attempts to preserve their ancestral land and heritage. The term potiki can mean "youngest child" or "last-born child" in te reo Māori (the Māori language), and the title refers to the character of Tokowaru-i-te-Marama (or Toko), a child who foresees and is impacted by the conflict over the land.

Toko is a physically disabled child born to an intellectually disabled mother and an unknown father. He is adopted by his mother's brother Hemi and his wife Roimata, and raised with their three children James, Tangimoana, and Manu, in a small community with close connections to the land and the sea. After the closure of the local freezing works, Hemi has no job and they focus on taking care of the land. Toko has visions, however, of future conflict.

Later in the novel, developers attempt to acquire land to build an access road to a new beach resort, which would destroy the community's cemetery and meeting house. The community refuses and the developers react by burning down the marae, and then again with violence as foreseen by Toko, and Toko himself is killed in the final conflict. At the end of the novel, we learn that Toko was narrating as a spirit from within the new marae, and the community begins to rebuild.

== Style and themes ==
The book is narrated by different voices, including most notably Toko, his aunt Roimata and his uncle Hemi, and has a non-linear spiral-like structure. Grace intentionally set the novel out as though it was a whaikōrero (formal speech), following the standard format in Māori oratory: beginning with a chant, then greetings, then telling the story, and at the end finishing with "Ka huri" (sometimes translated as "spread the word" or "over to you", signalling that it is now the turn of the next speaker to tell their story).

The story of Toko reflects that of Māui, the hero of Māori mythology, through factors like his relationship with the sea, his unusual birth and other symbols. He is also sometimes described as a Jesus Christ–like figure; as academic Roger Robinson notes, Toko's birth parents are a woman called Mary and (possibly) a man called Joseph, and Toko's sacrifice leads to renewal for the community.

== Publication ==
The first edition of Potiki was published by Penguin Books New Zealand in 1986. By 1998 it had sold over 25,000 copies, making it one of the top-selling New Zealand novels at that time and the first member of the "Penguin 25 Club".

The novel was first published overseas by The Women's Press in London in 1987, and has subsequently been translated into seven languages (German, French, Spanish, Portuguese, Italian, Dutch and Māori). It is one of very few New Zealand books, and as of 2021 the only New Zealand book by a Māori author, to be translated into Portuguese. In 2020, it was re-published as a Penguin Classic in the United Kingdom.

== Reception ==
Potiki was widely praised by reviewers and has received several notable awards. John Beston, writing for Landfall, identified it as marking a new stage in Grace's career: "there is strong growth in Grace in this book, personally as well as artistically, as she presents an alternate way of life to that of the Pakeha [New Zealand European], with its own values". Ten years after its publication, Robinson wrote in The Oxford Companion to New Zealand Literature that the novel "remains both a popular success and a reference point for discussion of Māori writing and international postcolonial fiction". The novel received third place in the Wattie Book of the Year Awards in 1986, and won the New Zealand Book Award for Fiction in 1987. In 1994 it received the LiBeraturpreis award in Germany.

Some critics viewed the novel as a political work; Beston in his Landfall review suggested that "having sought previously to soothe her Pakeha readers and to suppress her anger, [Grace] is now ready to charge them, not with past and irremediable injustices, but with continuing injustices". In response to these comments, Grace has said that she was endeavouring to write about "ordinary lives of ordinary people" and did not expect it to be seen as political. She also rejects criticism that the novel is racist against Pākehā, and notes that she never specified the race of the developers.

The novel was also criticised by some publications, including Publishers Weekly, for using te reo Māori (the Māori language) without including a glossary. Grace explained:

I'd had a glossary in a previous work and then I suddenly thought that a glossary is there for foreign languages, italics are there for foreign languages. I didn't want Māori to be treated as a foreign language in its own country.

== Legacy ==
During the 1980s, Māori language and culture underwent a renaissance, of which Potiki was a significant part. Academics such as Janet Wilson have commented on the novel's role in presenting themes of Māori resistance to colonialisation.

The novel received fifth place in a list of favourite New Zealand books over the last 30 years based on a poll of writers, publishers and booksellers by The Dominion Post. In 2018 the novel ranked 12th on The Spinoff's list of favourite New Zealand books over the last 50 years as voted by readers, and third on an equivalent list voted by 50 literary experts. In 2016 a sculpture honouring Grace was unveiled on the Porirua Writers' Walk on the shore of Titahi Bay, inscribed with the following quote from Potiki:

Morning came slowly giving outline to the sea and hills, patterning the squares of houses, moulding the rocks, the power poles and the low scrub.

A 2020 review in The Guardian observed that Potiki continues to be relevant long after its publication; in 2014 Grace successfully resisted the New Zealand Government's attempts to forcibly acquire land in Hongoeka to build an expressway. A review of the 2020 Penguin Classic edition in The Arts Desk noted that the novel "offers a timely insight into contemporary issues", highlighting its focus on Māori perception of the natural world and its relevance to contemporary issues of capitalism and climate change.
