= LIANZA Young People's Non-Fiction Award =

New Zealand book award

The LIANZA Young People's Non-Fiction Award was established in 1986 by the Library and Information Association of New Zealand Aotearoa (LIANZA). It aimed to encourage the production of the best non-fiction writing for young New Zealanders. The award was renamed the LIANZA Elsie Locke Non-Fiction Award in 2002, and that award became the Elsie Locke Non-Fiction Award in 2016.

== History ==
The LIANZA Young People's Non-Fiction Award was an initiative of the Library and information Association of New Zealand Aotearoa (LIANZA). The LIANZA Children and Young Adult Book Awards began in 1945 with the Esther Glen Award. Later they expanded to encompass a wide range of awards for non-fiction, young adult, illustration, works in Te Reo Māori and librarian’s choice as well as fiction. The Awards were judged by a panel of experienced librarians.

The non-fiction award, established in 1986, was known as the LIANZA Young People’s Non-Fiction Award. Its aim was to encourage the writing and production of high-quality non-fiction books for young New Zealand readers.

In 2002, it was renamed the LIANZA Elsie Locke Non-Fiction Award to commemorate the life and work of Elsie Locke (1912–2001), whose own fiction and non-fiction for children often focused on New Zealand history. Elsie Locke was a writer, historian, peace activist and campaigner for women’s rights, social justice, nuclear disarmament and the environment. She won a number of awards for her writing including the Gaelyn Gordon Award for a Much-Loved Book and the Margaret Mahy Medal. Her historical children’s novels included The Runaway Settlers (1965), The End of the Harbour (1969) and A Canoe in the Mist (1984), and her non-fiction for young people included Two Peoples, One Land: A History of Aotearoa (1988).

In 2016, the LIANZA Awards were merged with the New Zealand Book Awards for Children and Young Adults. The Award is now called the Elsie Locke Award for Non-Fiction.

== List of recipients ==
1987	Gaijin: Foreign Children in Japan by Olive and Ngaio Hill (Longman Paul, 1986)
1988	No award
1989	It’s OK to be You! Feeling Good about Growing Up by Claire Patterson, ill. Lindsay Quilter (Century Hutchinson, 1988)
1990	The Web: the Triumph of a New Zealand Girl over Anorexia by Deborah Furley (Collins, 1989)
1991	Model Boats that Really Go by John Reid (Random Century, 1990)
1992	The Damselfly by Peter Garland (Nelson Price Milburn, c1990)
1993	Albatross Adventure by Kim Westerskov (Nelson Price Milburn, c1992)
1994	Paikea by Robyn Kahukiwa (Viking, 1993)
1995	Shadows on the Wall by Barbara Cairns and Helen Martin (Longman Paul, 1994)
1996	Laura’s Poems by Laura Ranger (Godwit Publishing, 1995)
1997	The Field by Diana Noonan, photographs by Nic Bishop [I Spy Wildlife series] (Heinemann Education 1996)
1998	The Life-size Guide to Native Trees and Other Common Plants of New Zealand’s Native Forest by Andrew Crowe (Penguin, 1997)
1999	No award
2000	No award
2001	The Tuatara by Brian Parkinson (Reed Children's Books, 2000)

== See also ==
- List of New Zealand literary awards
