= Kohai Grace =

New Zealand weaver

- Born: 1966 (age 59–60); New Zealand
- Education: Wellington Arts Centre. Te Wānanga o Raukawa, Bachelor of Design and Art. Massey University, Masters (Māori Visual Arts).
- Known for: Weaving, teaching
- Style: Māori weaving
- Relatives: Patricia Grace (mother)

Kohai Grace (born 1966) is a New Zealand weaver. Her iwi are Ngāti Toa Rangatira, Ngāti Porou, Te Āti Awa and Ngāti Raukawa.

== Biography ==
Grace learnt weaving under Kataraina Hetet-Winiata at the Wellington Arts Centre. She also learned under the esteemed Rangi Hetet and Erenora Puketapu-Hetet whilst completing a Bachelor of Design and Art at Te Wānanga o Raukawa. She holds a Masters in Māori Visual Arts from Massey University.

From 1998 to 2005 Grace was a weaving teacher at Te Wānanga o Raukawa.

In 2008, she was the de Young Museum's artist-in-residence in San Francisco, which coincided with the event Māori Art Meets America.

== Works ==
Her weaving is based upon customary practice and the use of natural materials and has been described as having a "strong contemporary edge". Her work has been included in international exhibitions such as E tū Ake which toured to Musée du quai Branly, Paris and Museo de las Culturas, Mexico City. Her work is also held in the collection of the Museum of New Zealand Te Papa Tongarewa.

In 1990, she was commissioned by the National Library of New Zealand to produce tukutuku (woven panels) for the Nga Kupu Korero exhibition which toured the country and focused on issues surrounding the Treaty of Waitangi, 150 years after its signing.

Two festivals Grace has participated in are the Island to Island Festival, Tasmania in 2001, and the Festival of Pacific Arts, Palau in 2004.

In 2004, she presented the Tui Cloak, a garment made with harakeke and inspired by the white throat feathers of the tūī bird.

In 2007, her garment Wahine o te Pō won awards at Style Pasifika in Auckland in 2007, and was in the New Zealand Fashion Museum exhibition Black in Fashion: Wearing the colour black in New Zealand.

== Exhibitions ==
- 2004: Toi Māori: The Eternal Thread – Te Aho Mutunga Kore at the Pataka Art + Museum and The Māori Art Market.
- 2005: Te Tataitanga Matatau, an exhibition of artwork from Massey University's postgraduate Mäori Visual Arts students.
- 2005 to 2006: Toi Māori: The Eternal Thread – Te Aho Mutunga Kore, the featured component of Māori Art Meets America, San Francisco.
- 2007: Tukākahumai: Garments Stand Firth at Pataka Art + Museum solo exhibition of weaving as part of her masters course.
- 2009: He Maumahratanga - A Woven Tribute at Ngā Taonga Sound and Vision, Wellington.
- 2011 and 2012: Black in Fashion: Wearing the colour black in New Zealand.
- 2011 to 2013: E Tū Ake: Standing Strong.
- 2013: Call of Taranaki: Reo Karanga o Taranaki (2013) at Puke Ariki, New Plymouth.
- 2015: Work by herself, and past and present students of Whitireia New Zealand's Toi Poutama weaving and carving course where she teaches, at Pataka Art + Museum.

== Awards ==
- 2007: Wahine o te Pō won the Traditionally Inspired and Overall Runner Up awards at Style Pasifika in Auckland in 2007.
