= Hineahuone =

First woman in Māori Mythology

Hineahuone or, Hine-ahu-one ("Earth made Woman") is the first woman in Māori Mythology made by Tāne from the clay native to the mythological location of Kurawaka. She bore a child with Tāne named Hinetītama (otherwise known as Hinenui-i-te-pō).
