= Patricia Grace =

New Zealand writer (born 1937)

Patricia Grace DCNZM QSO
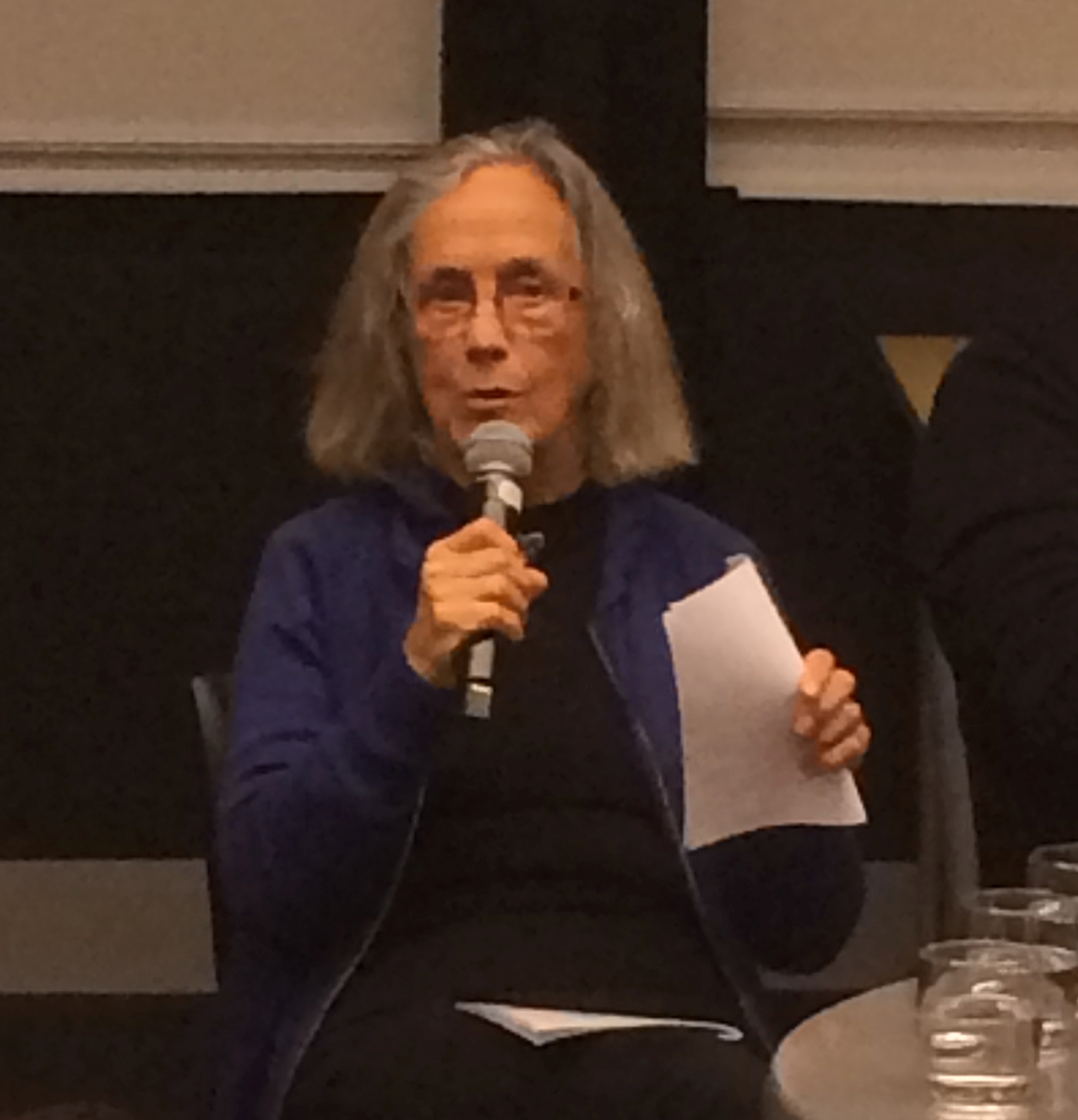
- Grace in 2016
- Born: Patricia Frances Gunson; 17 August 1937 (age 89); Wellington, New Zealand
- Occupation: Author
- Spouse: Kerehi Waiariki Grace (died 2013)
- Children: 7, including Kohai Grace
- Writing career
- Genres: Fiction, short stories, children's fiction

Patricia Frances Grace DCNZM QSO (née Gunson; born 17 August 1937) is a New Zealand writer of novels, short stories, and children's books. She began writing as a young adult, while working as a teacher. Her early short stories were published in magazines, leading to her becoming the first female Māori writer to publish a collection of short stories, Waiariki, in 1975. Her first novel, Mutuwhenua: The Moon Sleeps, followed in 1978.

Since becoming a full-time writer in the 1980s, Grace has written seven novels, seven short-story collections, a non-fiction biography and an autobiography. Her works explore Māori life and culture, including the impact of Pākehā (New Zealand European) and other cultures on Māori, with use of the Māori language throughout. Her most well-known novel, Potiki (1986) features a Māori community opposing the private development of their ancestral land. She has also written a number of children's books, seeking to write books in which Māori children can see their own lives.

Grace is a pioneering and influential figure in New Zealand literature, and over her career has won a number of awards, including the Kiriyama Prize, the Neustadt International Prize for Literature, two honorary doctorates of literature, a Prime Minister's Award for Literary Achievement, and an Icon Award from the Arts Foundation of New Zealand for extraordinary lifetime achievement. Her books have twice won the top award for fiction at the New Zealand Book Awards. She was appointed a Distinguished Companion of the New Zealand Order of Merit (DCNZM) in 2007, for services to literature.

== Early life and career ==
Patricia Grace is of Ngāti Toa, Ngāti Raukawa and Te Āti Awa descent. She was born on 17 August 1937 in Wellington, New Zealand. Her father was Māori and her mother was European and Irish Catholic. On her father's side she is descended from politician Wi Parata. She grew up in the suburb of Melrose, where her father had built the family home, and also spent time with her father's family at Hongoeka, on their ancestral land. In 1944, when she was seven, her father enlisted in the Māori Battalion to fight in the Second World War.

She attended St Anne's School in Wellington, where she later described experiencing racism: "I found that being different meant that I could be blamed – for a toy gun being stolen, for writing being chalked on a garage wall, for neighbourhood children swearing, for a grassy hillside being set alight". Grace has said that as a child she did not learn to speak Māori, because it was only spoken at formal events such as tangi (traditional Māori funeral ceremonies). She began to make efforts to learn as an adult, but found it difficult. She subsequently attended St Mary's College, where she excelled at basketball, and subsequently Wellington Teachers' Training College. It was not until she had left high school that she began to read works by New Zealand authors; she said that until this time, "I didn't kind of know that a writer was something one could aspire to be and that was partly because I'd never read writing by New Zealand writers". She began writing at age 25, while working full-time as a teacher in North Auckland.

Her first published short story was "The Dream", in bilingual magazine Te Ao Hou / The New World in 1966. In 1979, South Pacific Television produced a television version of this story for the show Pacific Viewpoint. She also had early stories published in the New Zealand Listener. These early works led to a publisher approaching Grace to ask her to work on a collection of short stories. In 1974 she received the first Māori Purposes Fund Board grant for Māori writers.

== Literary career ==
=== 1975–1990 ===
Grace's first published book, Waiariki (1975), was the first collection of short stories to be published by a female Māori writer, and its ten stories show the diversity of Māori life and culture. Writer Rachel Nunns said these early stories "inform readers at an emotional, imaginative level with the sense of what it means to be a Maori". Grace's first novel, Mutuwhenua: The Moon Sleeps (1978), was about the relationship of a Māori woman and Pākehā man and their experiences coming from different cultures. It was inspired by the experiences of Grace's parents, and marked the first time a relationship of this kind had been described by a Māori writer. It was followed by her second collection of short stories The Dream Sleepers and Other Stories (1980). This collection featured a three-page story told by a mother speaking to her new baby, called "Between Earth and Sky", which is one of the best-known and most anthologised New Zealand short stories. These early works were critically acclaimed. In 1984 she collaborated with painter Robyn Kahukiwa to produce Wahine Toa: Women of Maori Myth, a book about women from Māori legends featuring Kahukiwa's paintings. Although she continued working as a full-time teacher until 1985, her income in this period was supplemented by grants from the New Zealand Literary Fund in 1975 and 1983.

In the early 1980s, Grace began writing for children, and sought to write books in which Māori children could see their own lives. The Kuia and the Spider / Te Kuia me te Pungawerewere (1981), illustrated by Kahukiwa, told the story of a spinning contest between a kuia (elderly Māori woman) and a spider, and was published by a group of women from the Spiral Collective in both English and Māori. Grace subsequently published Watercress Tuna and the Children of Champion Street / Te Tuna Watakirihi me Nga Tamariki o te Tiriti o Toa (1984), also illustrated by Kahukiwa (and published in English, Māori and Samoan) and several Māori language readers. The Trolley (1993), illustrated by Kerry Gemmill, told the story of a single mother making a trolley for her children for Christmas.

In 1985, Grace received a writing fellowship at Victoria University of Wellington, which enabled her to give up teaching, become a full-time writer, and complete the novel Potiki (1986), which became her most successful novel. The plot of the novel featured a Māori community opposing the private development of their ancestral land, and the attempts of the developer to buy them out. The name "potiki" can mean "youngest child" or "last-born" in Māori, and refers to the central character of Toko, a child who foresees and is impacted by the conflict over the land. Grace intentionally did not include a glossary for Māori language terms in the book or italicise these terms, on the basis that she "didn't want the Māori language to be treated as a foreign language in its own country". The novel was viewed by some critics as political; John Beston, writing for Landfall, suggested that "having sought previously to soothe her Pakeha readers and to suppress her anger, [Grace] is now ready to charge them, not with past and irremediable injustices, but with continuing injustices". Grace said that she was endeavouring to write about "ordinary lives of ordinary people" and did not expect it to be seen as political. The novel has been translated into seven languages, and in 2020 was republished in Britain by the Penguin Classics imprint.

Grace was also active in the promotion of Māori arts during the 1980s. In 1983 she was a founding member of Haeata, a Māori women artists' collective, through which she guided young Māori women artists and participated in group exhibitions such as "Karanga Karanga" (1986), which was the first exhibition of collaborative work by Māori women artists in a public museum. In the late 1980s, she was a founding member of Te Hā, a collective of Māori writers. Her third short story collection, Electric City and Other Stories was published in 1987.

=== 1990–2015 ===
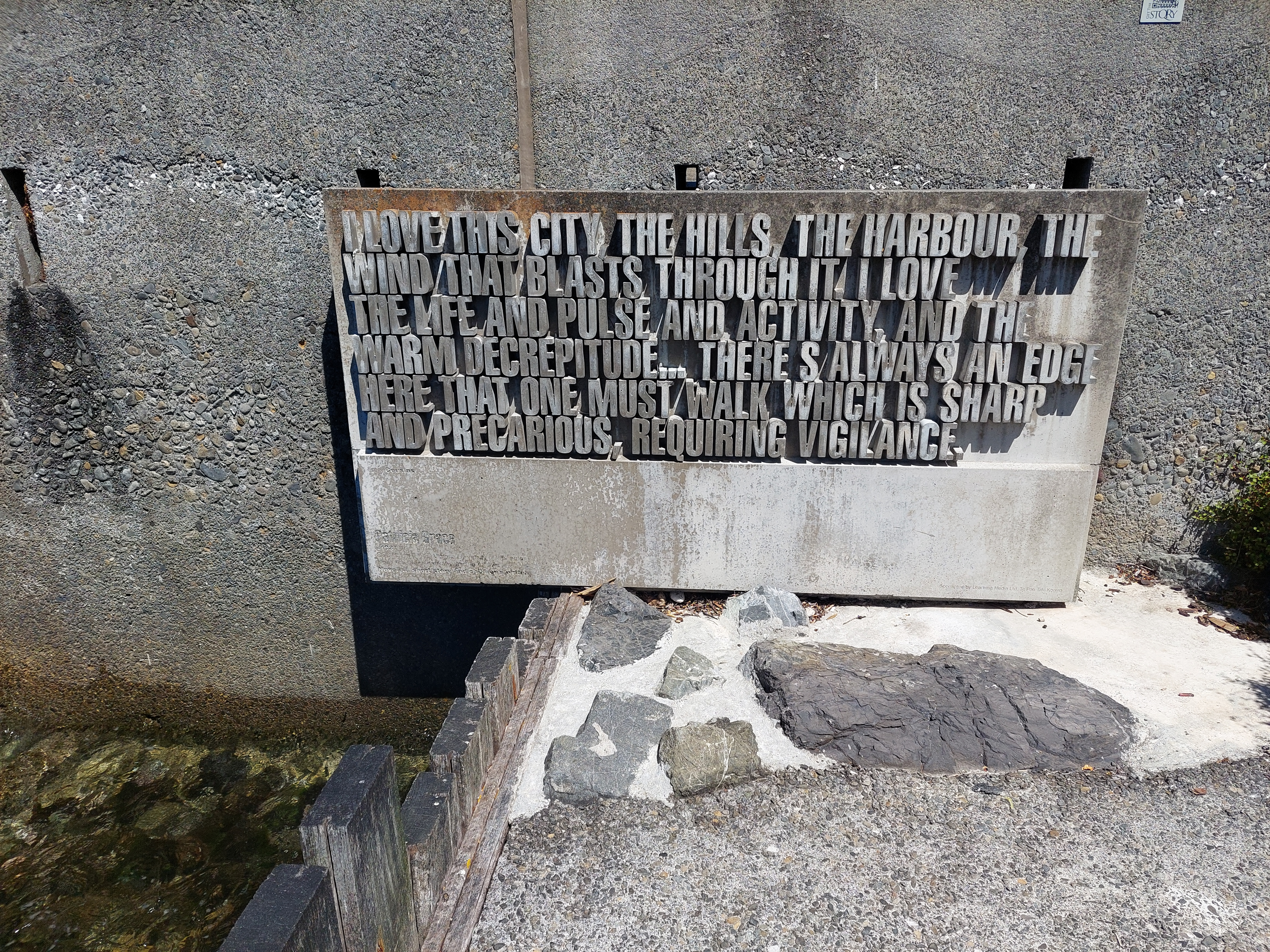
The quotation for Patricia Grace on the Wellington Writers Walk

Grace's third novel, Cousins, was published in 1992. It is the story of three cousins across different parts of their lives. Like Māori culture as a whole it is concerned with whakapapa (family history) and family ties, rather than the success of the individual, and it reflects troubling parts of New Zealand's history such as the removal of Māori children from their families by the state. Academic Roger Robinson said that while the book sometimes seems like a polemic, "Grace's descriptive and impressionistic skills, her insight into the consciousness of women and children, and the sustained inwardness of the Māori perspective, make Cousins a significant and uniquely Māori version of the genre of family saga". Grace has used Cousins as an example of her approach to writing, which is to develop characters before developing plot: "I had an idea in mind that I was going to base the novel around two cousins, two women who shared the same ancestry, and during the course of the story the third cousin became important to the plot."

Her fourth novel, Baby No-Eyes, was published in 1998, having taken her five years to write. The book is narrated by an unborn child who was killed together with her father in a car accident, along with other members of her family, and weaves together family drama with contemporary Māori problems. Pauline Swain, reviewing the book for The Dominion, praised Grace's "deceptively light touch with material that in other hands could be bombastic or preachy", and noted "her portrayal of contemporary issues such as land claims and the right to use genetic information for research loses nothing in impact for all its delicately oblique handling". Nelson Wattie, writing in the New Zealand Review of Books, called it "profoundly disturbing" and lacking in coherence, but acknowledged that "the doubts expressed here run counter to the warmth with which this book, like others of its author, has been greeted elsewhere". It was soon followed by her fifth novel Dogside Story (2001) centred on a small seaside Māori community. Reviewer Simone Drichel observed that although the book shared some similarities in setting and characters with Potiki, the "nature of the challenges" faced by Maori had changed in the intervening years: "For the first time ... it is not primarily the interaction with Pakeha that poses a challenge for Maori, but Maoridom itself."

By this time, Grace had become an established and well-known writer. Elspeth Sandys observed in 2001 that the release of a new novel by Grace was "one of the more significant events in [New Zealand's] literary calendar". Her sixth novel, Tu (2004), was based on the experiences of the Māori Battalion in Italy during the Second World War, and in particular the experiences of Grace's father and other family members who were part of the Battalion. She described the experience of writing a book about "men and especially men at war" as a "wonderful challenge". Reviewer Iain Sharp praised Grace's compassionate treatment of the subject, concluding: "The crowning achievement of this fine writer's career, Tu will surely become one of the classics of our literature". In 2013 it was adapted for the theatre by New Zealand playwright Hone Kouka.

Small Holes in the Silence, published in 2006, was Grace's first collection of short stories since 1987. Lawrence Jones in the New Zealand Review of Books praised the variety of stories but felt it did not meet the "sheer sustained emotional engagement of the earlier collections", and James O'Sullivan for the Taranaki Daily News equally found the stories "less than memorable". Both reviewers felt that the short story "Eben", about a mentally disabled homeless man, was the strongest story in the collection. In 2008 she published a children's book, Maraea and the Albatrosses / Ko Maraea Me Nga Toroa, illustrated by her brother Brian Gunson. Grace was approached around this time by the family of Ned Nathan, a Māori Battalion soldier who was wounded in Crete, and his wife Katina, a Cretan woman who nursed him back to health, and asked to write the story of their relationship. The resulting non-fiction biography, Ned & Katina: a true love story, was published in 2009. At this time Grace put aside her draft novel (later to be published as Chappy in 2015) in order to concentrate on family responsibilities, including caring for her mother and husband.

=== 2015–present ===
Grace's seventh novel Chappy was published in 2015, and topped New Zealand's bestseller list. It was her first novel in over ten years, and was dedicated to her husband who had died in 2013. It is a family saga about a relationship between a Japanese man and a Māori woman, and is structured with multiple narrators and events related in a non-linear way. Simone Oettli, in her review for Landfall, noted that the themes of the book include "acceptance of cultural differences ... disappearance and loss, love and belonging, as well as the craft of storytelling". Lawrence Jones called it "well worth the decade-long wait". In the same year she published children's picture book Haka, which told the story of the "Ka Mate" haka. It was illustrated by Andrew Burdan and translated into Māori as Whiti Te Rā! by Kawata Teepa.

Grace continues to be recognised for her "pioneering role" in New Zealand literature. In a review of Chappy, Paula Morris described Grace as "a quiet and persistent presence in New Zealand literature, a groundbreaker who is, at the same time, old-fashioned in the calmness of her tone, the particularity of her focus, and her abiding interest in the particularities of Māori customs and stories". In July 2016 a sculpture in her honour was unveiled on the Porirua Writers' Walk, featuring a quote from Potiki (Grace also features on the Wellington Writers Walk, established in 2002). In 2017 her children's book Watercress Tuna and the Children of Champion Street was adapted for the stage by Tupe Lualua and performed by 70 students from Cannon's Creek School at the Measina Festival, a showcase of Pasifika art and theatre. In 2018, a bilingual edition of Wāhine Toa, translated by Hēni Jacob, was published by Te Tākupu (the publishing house of Te Wānanga o Raukawa).

Her autobiography From the Centre: a writer's life was published by Penguin Books in May 2021. Reviewer Emma Espiner said of the book that it "relays a lifetime of doing things her own way"; "The picture that emerges is of a quietly determined, subversive and nuanced thinker". In the same year, her novel Cousins (1992) was adapted into the feature film of the same name, directed by Ainsley Gardiner and Briar Grace-Smith. Grace-Smith was previously married to Grace's son, and had attended the launch of the novel 19 years earlier at Takapūwāhia Marae. In 2021, Grace was the chief judge for the Sargeson Prize (named after Frank Sargeson), New Zealand's most valuable short-story prize.

In 2024, a new collection of short stories by Grace was published, titled Bird Child and Other Stories. Her granddaughter Miriama Grace-Smith designed the cover artwork. It is her first new short story collection in seventeen years. When readers of Newsroom were asked to share their thoughts on Grace to enter a contest for a free copy of the book, Steve Braunias noted that he had previously seen "enthusiastic comments about authors but nothing resembling the depth of feeling – let's call it what it is: awe – towards Grace". A subsequent review of the book in Newsroom concluded that the book is "a worthwhile addition to Grace's legacy".

== Awards and honours ==
Grace has won awards for her writing since the outset of her career, with her first book, Waiariki (1975), receiving the Hubert Church Memorial Award for Best First Book of Fiction, awarded by PEN NZ. Potiki (1986) came third in the Wattie Book of the Year Awards in 1986, and won the New Zealand Book Award for Fiction in 1987. In 1994 it received the LiBeraturpreis award in Germany. Her children's book The Kuia and the Spider / Te Kuia me te Pungawerewere (1981) won the Children's Picture Book of the Year Award at the New Zealand Government Publishing Awards, and The Trolley received the Russell Clark Award for children's book illustration in 1994. Baby No-Eyes (1988) was shortlisted for the Tasmania Pacific Region Prize. In the 1988 Queen's Birthday Honours, Grace was appointed a Companion of the Queen's Service Order (QSO) for community service. She also received Scholarships in Letters in 1988 and 1992–1993. In 1989, she was awarded an Honorary Doctorate of Literature (LitD) by Victoria University of Wellington.

Dogside Story (2001) won the 2001 Kiriyama Prize for Fiction, was longlisted for the Booker Prize in 2001 and the International IMPAC Dublin Literary Award in 2003, and was shortlisted in the Montana New Zealand Book Awards in 2002 and for the Tasmania Pacific Region Prize in 2004. Tu (2004) was awarded the Deutz Medal for Fiction and the Montana Award for Fiction at the 2005 Montana New Zealand Book Awards, and the 2005 Nielsen Book Data New Zealand Booksellers' Choice Award. Chappy (2015) was a finalist in the fiction category at the 2016 Ockham New Zealand Book Awards. In the same year, her children's picture book Haka, translated into Māori as Whiti te Rā! by Kawata Teepa, was the recipient of the Te Kura Pounamu Award for the best Māori language work at the New Zealand Book Awards for Children and Young Adults.

In 2005 Grace received an Icon Award from the Arts Foundation of New Zealand, an award bestowed on twenty of New Zealand's most significant living artists for extraordinary lifetime achievement. In 2006, she was one of three honourees awarded a Prime Minister's Award for Literary Achievement, recognising her significant contribution to New Zealand's literature. Helen Clark, then the prime minister of New Zealand, said her work "played a key role in the emergence of Maori fiction in English".

Grace was appointed a Distinguished Companion of the New Zealand Order of Merit (DCNZM), for services to literature, in the 2007 Queen's Birthday Honours. In 2009, she declined redesignation as a Dame Companion following the restoration of titular honours by the New Zealand government. At the time, she expressed the opinion that the restoration of titles was a retrograde step and that she "thought that we were getting away from the colonial past".

In 2008, Grace was awarded the Neustadt International Prize for Literature. Joy Harjo, who nominated Grace for the Neustadt Prize, has said of her writing:

"Grace's stories make a shining and enduring place formed of the brilliant weave of Maori oral storytelling and contained within the shape of contemporary Western forms. We are welcomed in, and when we get up to leave, we have been well fed, we have made friends and family, and we are bound to understanding and knowledge of one another."

Grace received an honorary Doctorate of Letters (DLit) from the World Indigenous Nations University in 2016, conferred at Te Wānanga o Raukawa, Ōtaki, for her literary accomplishments and her writing around Māori themes. In the same year, she was awarded the Te Tohu Aroha mō Te Arikinui Dame Te Atairangikaahu (Exemplary/Supreme Award) at the Te Waka Toi Awards, which she described as a "great honour".

== Personal life ==
Grace was married to children's author Kerehi Waiariki Grace, having met him at teachers' college. They had seven children together, and he died in 2013. Grace has described their marriage as one of shared contributions: "My husband and I worked together on everything that needed to be done. It wasn't as though I had to do the housework and look after the children, because we shared all this." Her novel Chappy (2015) was dedicated to him. Their daughter Kohai is an acclaimed weaver, and their sons Wiremu and Himonia are filmmakers.

Grace does voluntary work, such as managing iwi work schemes for unemployed people. In 2014, she won a legal battle against the New Zealand Government, which had tried to compulsorily acquire land at Waikanae under the Public Works in order to build the now built Kāpiti expressway. The court decided that the land, which was the last remaining part of Wi Parata's landholdings held by his descendants, should be protected as a Māori reservation. As of 2021, Grace was still living in Hongoeka, on her ancestral land and close to her home marae (meeting place).

== Selected works ==
=== Novels ===
- Mutuwhenua: The Moon Sleeps (Longman Paul, 1978)
- Potiki (1986)
- Cousins (Penguin Books NZ, 1992)
- Baby No-eyes (Penguin Books NZ, 1998)
- Dogside Story (Penguin Books NZ, 2001)
- Tu (Penguin Books NZ, 2004)
- Chappy (Penguin Books NZ, 2015)

=== Non-fiction ===
- Ned and Katina: a true love story (Penguin Books NZ, 2009), biography
- From the Centre: a writer's life (Penguin Books NZ, 2021), autobiography

=== Short-story collections ===
- Waiariki (Longman Paul, 1975)
- The Dream Sleepers (Longman Paul, 1980)
- Electric City and Other Stories (Penguin Books NZ, 1987)
- Selected Stories (Penguin Books NZ, 1991)
- The Sky People (Penguin Books NZ, 1994)
- Collected Stories (Penguin Books NZ, 2001)
- Small Holes in the Silence (Penguin Books NZ, 2006)
- Bird Child and Other Stories (Penguin Books NZ, 2024)

=== Children's books ===
- The Kuia and the Spider / Te Kuia me te Pungawerewere (Kidsarus 2 / Longman Paul, 1981), illustrated by Robyn Kahukiwa
- Watercress Tuna and the Children of Champion Street / Te Tuna Watakirihi me Nga Tamariki o te Tiriti o Toa (Penguin Books NZ, 1984), illustrated by Robyn Kahukiwa
- The Trolley (Penguin Books NZ, 1993), illustrated by Kerry Gemmill
- Areta & the Kahawai / Ko Areta me Nga Kahawai (Penguin Books NZ, 1994), illustrated by Kerry Gemmill
- Maraea and the Albatrosses / Ko Maraea me Nga Toroa (Penguin Books NZ, 2008), illustrated by Brian Gunson
- Haka / Whiti te Rā! (Huia Publishers, 2015), illustrated by Andrew Burdan and translated into Māori by Kawata Teepa
