= Hine-nui-te-pō =

Māori goddess

- Goddess of night and death
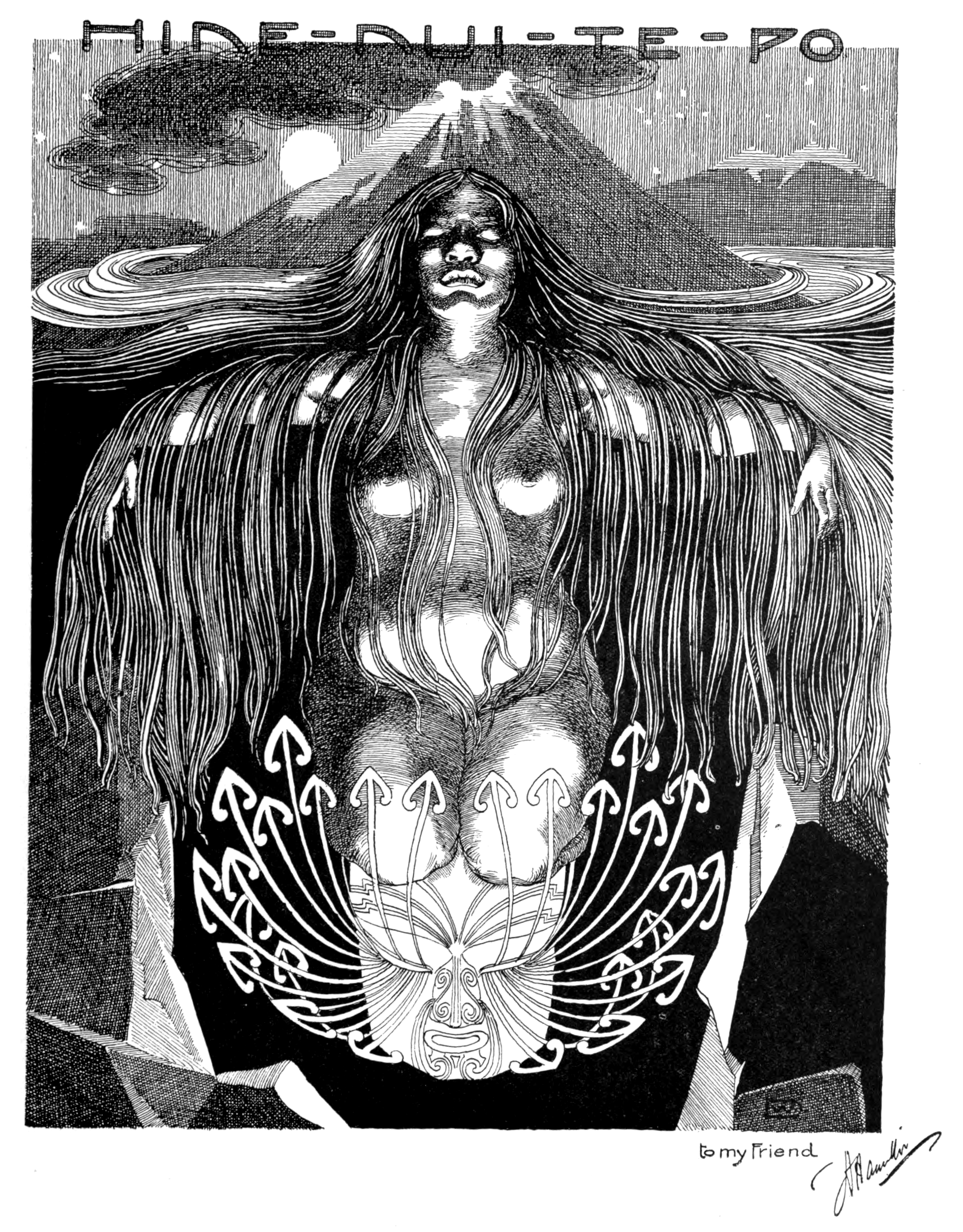
- Hine-nui-te-pō killing Māui by Wilhelm Dittmer
- Gender: Female
- Region: New Zealand (Aotearoa)
- Ethnic group: Māori

Genealogy
- Parents: Tāne, Hineahuone
- Siblings: Mahuika (In some versions)

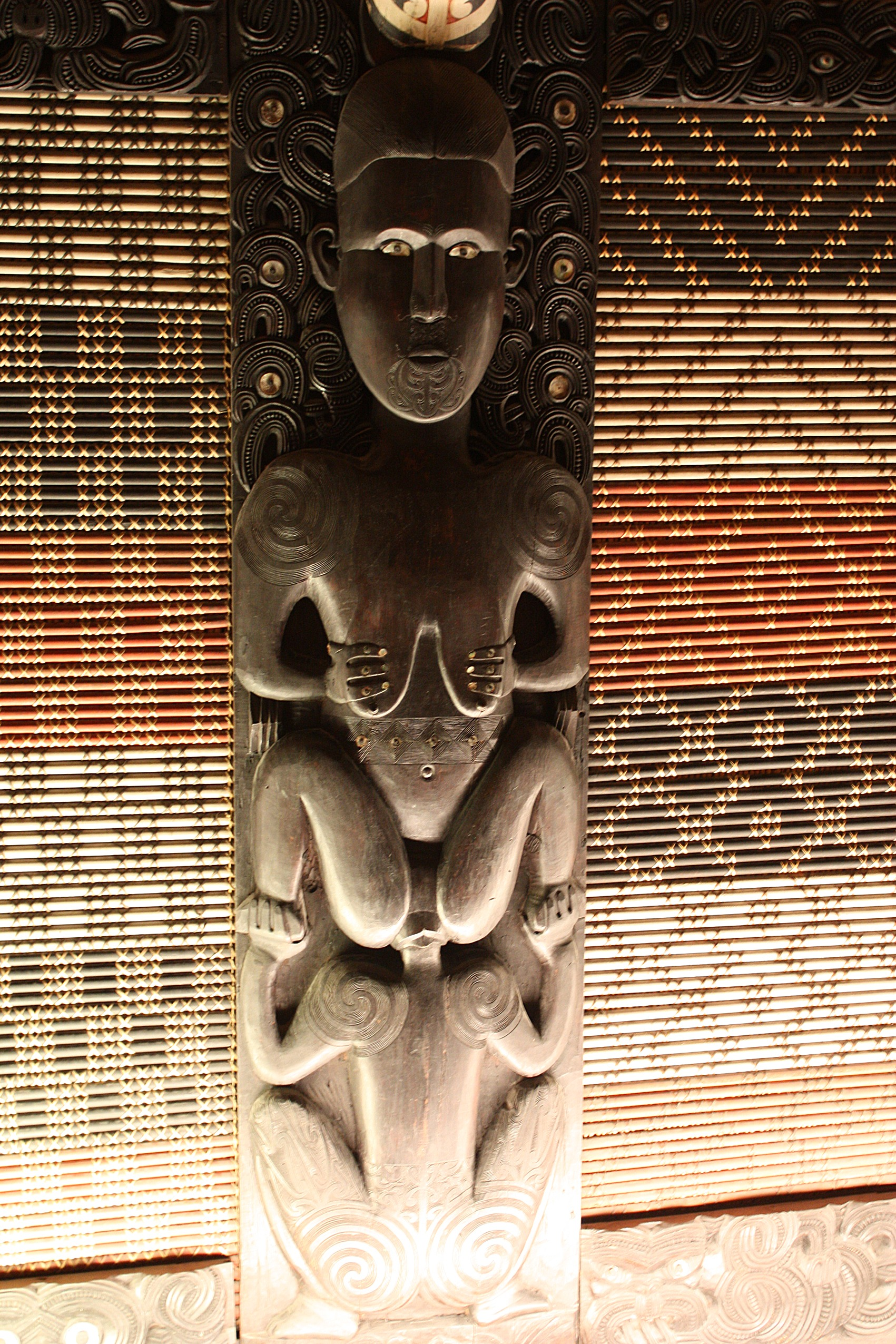
Māui attempting to enter Hine-nui-te-pō. Carving by Tene Waitere in the meeting house Rauru (opened in 1900).

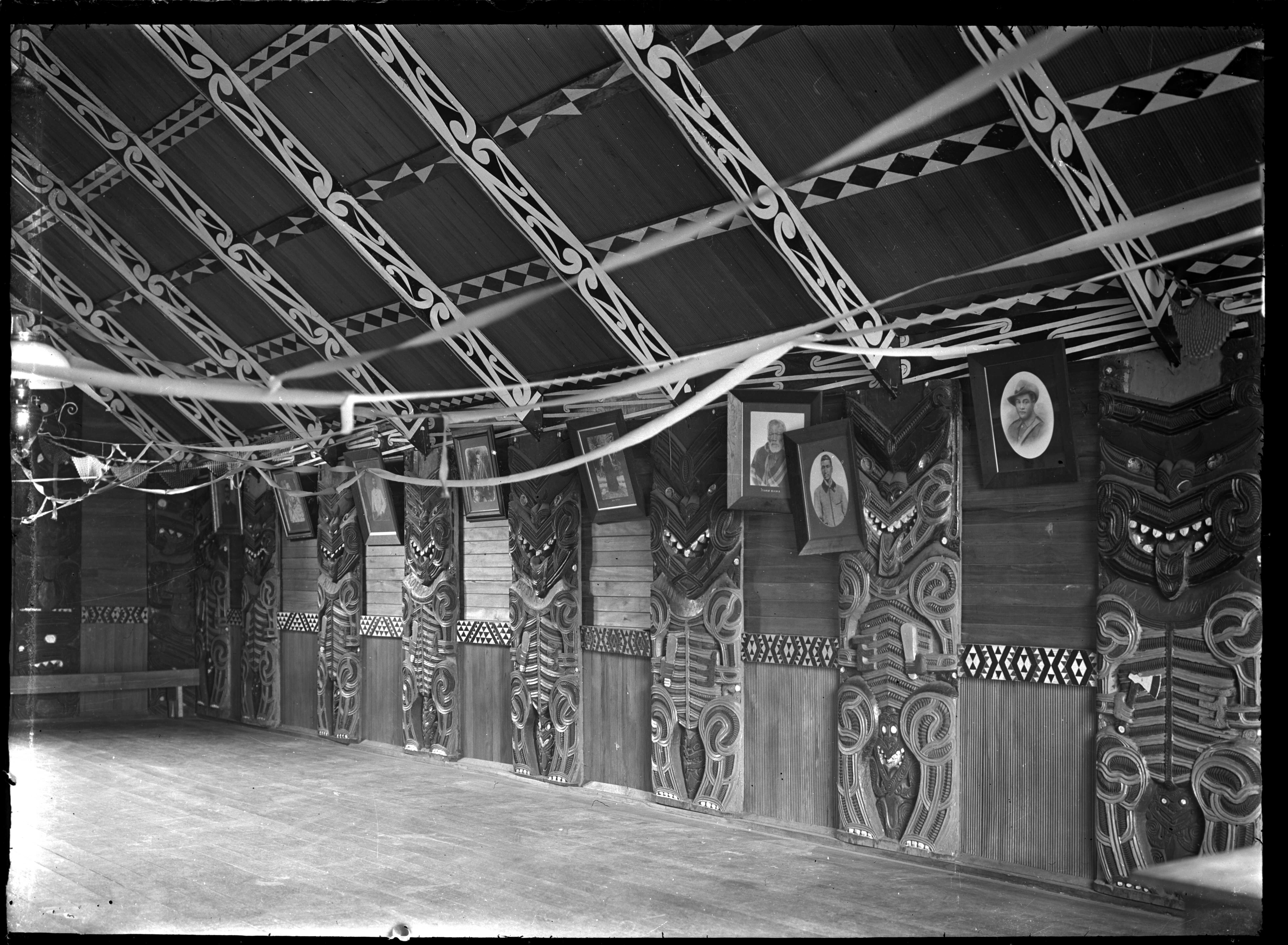
Hinenuitepo meeting house at Te Whaiti in 1930

Hine-nui-te-pō ("the great woman of the night") in Māori legends, is a goddess of night who receives the spirits of humans when they die. She is the daughter of Tāne Mahuta / Tāne Tuturi and Hine-ahuone. Hine-nui-te-pō shepherds the wairua/souls into the first level of Rarohenga to ready them for the next stage of their journey. Before she was Hine-nui-te-po her name was Hine-ti-tama. Without Hine-ti-Tama knowing their connection to each other, her father Tāne Mahuta pursued then married his daughter. Upon discovering that her husband was in fact her father, the betrayal and trauma compelled her to leave the world of the living and descend into the underworld. There, she became Hine-nui-te-pō, goddess of the night, and the guardian and mother of spirits.

== Background ==
Hine-nui-te-pō, also known as the "Great Woman of Night", is the goddess of death and the underworld. Her father is Tāne, the god of forests and land mammals. Her mother Hine-ahu-one is a human, made from earth. Hine-nui-te-pō is the second child of Tāne and Hine-ahu-one.

Without her knowing their connection to each other, Tāne pursued then married his daughter Hinetītama, and they went on to conceive and give birth to their daughter, Hinerauwhārangi.

Hinetītama ultimately became Hine-nui-te-pō, atua of the night and guardian of Rarohenga, after discovering that her husband, Tāne, had knowingly betrayed her, and was also her father. This trauma led her to the underworld, becoming Hine-nui-te-pō god of the night and guardian and mother of the spirits.

== Māui's encounter with Hine-nui-te-pō ==
The great hero Māui is tricked by his father into thinking he has a chance to achieve immortality. In order to obtain this, Māui is told to enter into the goddess through her vagina. While Hine-nui-te-pō is asleep, Māui undresses himself ready and turns into a lizard to enter himself into the goddess. The birds who were nearby, fantails, burst into laughter, alerting Hine-nui-te-po. Hine-nui-te-po reacted to being molested by crushing him with the obsidian teeth in her vagina; Māui was the first man to die.

== See also ==
- Vagina dentata
