= Robyn Kahukiwa =

New Zealand artist and author (1938–2025)

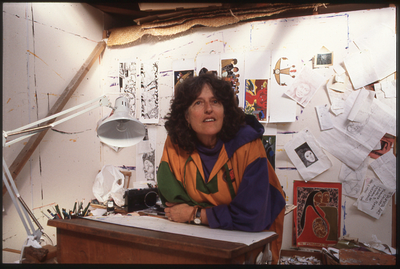
- Kahukiwa in her studio in 1995
- Born: 14 September 1938; Sydney, New South Wales, Australia
- Died: 11 April 2025 (aged 86); Wellington, New Zealand
- Known for: Painting; writing; illustration
- Notable work: Waahine Toa
- Spouse: Dooley Kahukiwa

Robyn Fletcher Kahukiwa (14 September 1938 – 11 April 2025) was a New Zealand artist, children's book author and illustrator. She created a significant collection of paintings, books, prints, drawings, and sculptures.

== Background ==
Kahukiwa was born in Sydney, Australia, on 14 September 1938. Through her mother, she was Māori, of Ngāti Porou, Te Aitanga-a-Hauiti, Ngāti Hau, Ngāti Konohi and Te Whānau a Ruataupare descent. She trained as a commercial artist, before moving to New Zealand at the age of 19. Kahukiwa's early artworks were inspired by re-discovering her Māori heritage, which she began doing after moving to New Zealand.

Kahukiwa died in Wellington on 11 April 2025, at the age of 86.

== Career ==
From 1972 to 1980, Kahukiwa was a regular exhibitor at the New Zealand Academy of Fine Arts in Wellington.

In 1984, Kahukiwa gained prominence in New Zealand after her exhibition Waahine Toa (strong women), which toured the country. This exhibition drew on Māori myth and symbolism. One of the pieces, Hinetītama, is in the permanent collection at Te Manawa.

Her picture books, such as Taniwha (1986), have allowed both Māori and non-Māori children to access te ao Māori.

In 1995, Kahukiwa exhibited a series named My Ancestors Are Always with Me in New York.

Ngā Pou Wāhine, her 2001 series highlighting the strengths of Māori women was destroyed in a fire at Tapu Te Ranga Marae, in 2019.

In 2011, Kahukiwa was awarded the Te Tohu Toi Kē Award from Te Waka Toi, the Creative New Zealand Māori arts awards.

In 2020, Kahukiwa was awarded Te Tohu Aroha mō Te Arikinui Dame Te Atairangikaahu, the Exemplary/Supreme Award, at Te Waka Toi Awards, in recognition of her life's work and achievements.

== Influences ==
Kahukiwa aimed to address the truth of New Zealand's history. As such, her work often dealt with themes of colonialism and the dispossession of indigenous people, motherhood and blood-ties, social custom and mythology. According to a 2004 article, Kahukiwa implemented "political activism in subject matter and method into powerful images that assert Māori identity and tradition". She was a "staunch supporter of Māori rights and the power and prestige of Māori women". Her work was influenced by Colin McCahon, Ralph Hotere and Frida Kahlo.

== Publications ==
- Taniwha (1986)
- Paikea (1993)
- The Koroua and the Mauri Stone (1994)
- Kēhua (1996)
- iharaira hohepa (2024)
- Supa Heroes: Te Wero (2000)
- Koha (2003)
- Matatuhi (2007)
- The Forgotten Taniwha (2009)
- Tutu Taniwha (2010)
- Te Marama (2011)
- The Boy and the Dolphin (2016)
- Ngā Atua: Māori Gods (2016)
- the bitten Maori kuri (2024)

With writer Patricia Grace:

- The Kuia and the Spider (1981)
- Watercress Tuna and the Children of Champion Street (1984)
- Wāhine Toa: Women of Māori Myth (1984)

With Joy Cowley:

- Grandma's stick (1982)
- Hatupatu and the birdwoman (1982)

With Rangimarie Sophie Jolley:

- The Blue Book (2014)

== Awards ==
- 1994 LIANZA Young People's Non-Fiction Award (now known as Elsie Locke Award) for Paikea
- 2011 Te Tohu Toi Kē | Making a Difference Award
- 2020 Te Tohu Aroha mō Te Arikinui Dame Te Atairangikaahu | Exemplary/Supreme Award
