= Elsie Locke Award for Non-Fiction =

The Elsie Locke Non-Fiction Award was first awarded in 2002 by the Library and Information Association of New Zealand Aotearoa (LIANZA). It aimed to encourage the production of the best non-fiction writing for young New Zealanders. The award was previously known as the LIANZA Young People's Non-Fiction Award, before being renamed in honour of Elsie Locke. The LIANZA Elsie Locke Non-Fiction Award became the Elsie Locke Non-Fiction Award when the LIANZA Awards merged with the New Zealand Book Awards for Children and Young Adults in 2016.

== History ==
The LIANZA Elsie Locke Non-Fiction Award was an initiative of the Library and information Association of New Zealand Aotearoa (LIANZA). The LIANZA Children and Young Adult Book Awards began in 1945 with the Esther Glen Award. Later they expanded to encompass a wide range of awards for non-fiction, young adult, illustration, works in Te Reo Māori and librarian’s choice as well as fiction. The Awards were judged by a panel of experienced librarians.

The non-fiction award, established in 1986, was first known as the LIANZA Young People’s Non-Fiction Award. Its aim was to encourage the writing and production of high-quality non-fiction books for young New Zealand readers.

In 2002, it was renamed the LIANZA Elsie Locke Non-fiction Award to commemorate the life and work of Elsie Locke (1912–2001), whose own fiction and non-fiction for children often focused on New Zealand history. Elsie Locke was a writer, historian, peace activist and campaigner for women’s rights, social justice, nuclear disarmament and the environment. She won a number of awards for her writing including the Gaelyn Gordon Award for a Much-Loved Book and the Margaret Mahy Medal. Her historical children’s novels included The Runaway Settlers (1965), The End of the Harbour (1969) and A Canoe in the Mist (1984), and her non-fiction for young people included Two Peoples, One Land: A History of Aotearoa (1988).

In 2016, the LIANZA Awards were merged with the New Zealand Book Awards for Children and Young Adults. The Award is now called the Elsie Locke Award for Non-Fiction.

== List of recipients ==
Year	Book
2002	I am a Spider by Simon Pollard (Reed Publishing, 2001)
2003	Which New Zealand Insect? by Andrew Crowe (Penguin Books, 2002)
2004	A Bird in the Hand: Keeping New Zealand Wildlife Safe by Janet Hunt (Random House New Zealand, 2003)
2005	Welcome to the South Seas: Contemporary New Zealand Art for Young People by Gregory O’Brien (Auckland University Press, 2004)
2006	Developments in New Zealand History (series) by Kevin Boon
2007	Red Haze: Australians and New Zealanders in Vietnam by Leon Davidson (Black Dog Books, 2006)
2008	Draw New Zealand Birds: A Step-by-step Guide by Heather Arnold (Reed, 2007)
2009	Atoms, dinosaurs & DNA: 68 Great New Zealand Scientists by Veronika Meduna and Rebecca Priestley (Random House New Zealand, 2008)
2010	Dear Alison: A New Zealand Soldier's Story from Stalag 383 edited by Simon Pollard (Penguin, 2009)
2011	The Kiwi Fossil Hunter’s Handbook by James Crampton and Marianna Terezow (Random House New Zealand, 2010)
2012	Nice Day for a War: Adventures of a Kiwi Soldier in World War I by Matt Elliott and Chris Slane (HarperCollins, 2011)
2013	At the Beach: Explore & Discover the New Zealand Seashore by Ned Barraud and Gillian Candler (Craig Potton Publishing, 2012)
2014	Wearable Wonders by Fifi Colston (Scholastic New Zealand, 2013)
2015	Māori Art for Kids by Norm Heke and Julie Noanoa (Craig Potton Publishing, 2014)
2016	ANZAC Heroes by Maria Gill, ill. Marco Ivancic (Scholastic New Zealand, 2016)
2016	Finalists: Changing Times: The Story of a New Zealand Town and its Newspaper by Bob Kerr (Potton & Burton, 2015); See what I can see: New Zealand Photography for the Young and Curious by Gregory O’Brien (Auckland University Press, 2015); The Beginner’s Guide to Adventure Sport in New Zealand by Steve Gurney (Random House New Zealand, 2015); Whose Beak is This? by Gillian Candler, ill. Fraser Williamson (Potton & Burton, 2015)
2017	Jack and Charlie: Boys of the Bush by Josh James Marcotte and Jack Marcotte (Penguin Random House New Zealand, 2016)
2017	Finalists: From Moa to Dinosaurs by Gillian Candler, ill. Ned Barraud (Potton & Burton, 2016), The Cuckoo and the Warbler by Kennedy Warne, ill. Heather Hunt (Potton & Burton, 2016), The Genius of Bugs by Simon Pollard (Te Papa Press, 2016), Torty and the Soldier by Jennifer Beck, ill. Fifi Colston (Scholastic NZ, 2017)
2018	Aotearoa: The New Zealand Story written and illustrated by Gavin Bishop (Puffin, Penguin Random House, 2017)
2018	Finalists: Explore! Aotearoa by Bronwen Wall, ill. Kimberly Andrews (Kennett Brothers, 2017); New Zealand's Great White Sharks by Alison Ballance (Potton & Burton, 2017); Sky High: Jean Batten's Incredible Flying Adventures by David Hill, ill. Phoebe Morris (Penguin Random House, 2017); The New Zealand Wars by Philippa Werry (New Holland, 2018)
2019	Art-tastic by Sarah Pepperle (Christchurch Art Gallery Te Puna o Waiwhetu, 2018)
2019	Finalists: Go Girl: A Storybook of Epic NZ Women by Barbara Else (Puffin, Penguin Random House, 2018); Ko Mauao te Maunga: Legend of Mauao by Debbie McCauley, ill. Debbie Tipuna and trans. Tamati Waaka (Mauao Publishing, 2018); New Zealand’s Backyard Beasts by Ned Barraud (Potton & Burton, 2018); Whose Home is This? by Gillian Candler, ill. Fraser Williamson (Potton & Burton, 2018)
2020	Mophead: How Your Difference Makes a Difference by Selina Tusitala Marsh (Auckland University Press, 2019)
2020	Finalists: Kuwi & Friends Māori Picture Dictionary by Kat Quin, trans. Pānia Papa (Illustrated Publishing, 2020); Te Tiriti o Waitangi / The Treaty of Waitangi by Ross Calman and Mark Derby, ill. Toby Morris, trans. Piripi Walker (School Journal Story Library, 2018); The Adventures of Tupaia by Courtney Sina Meredith, ill. Mat Tait (Allen & Unwin and Auckland War Memorial Museum, 2019); Three Kiwi Tales by Janet Hunt (Massey University Press, 2019)
2021	Egg and Spoon: An Illustrated Cookbook by Alexandra Tylee and illustrated by Giselle Clarkson (Gecko Press, 2020)
2021	Finalists: Mophead Tu: The Queen's Poem written and illustrated by Selina Tusitala Marsh (Auckland University Press, 2020); New Zealand Disasters by Maria Gill, ill. by Marco Ivančić (Scholastic New Zealand Limited, 2021); North and South written and illustrated by Sandra Morris (Walker Books Australia, 2021); You're Joking: Becoming an expert joke-teller by Tom E. Moffatt, ill. Paul Beavis (Write Laugh Books, 2020)
2022	Atua: Māori Gods and Heroes written and illustrated by Gavin Bishop (Picture Puffin, 2021)
2022	Draw Some Awesome written and illustrated by Donovan Bixley (Upstart Press Ltd, 2021); How Do I Feel? A Dictionary of Emotions for Children written by Rebekah Lipp and illustrated by Craig Phillips (Wildling Books, 2021); Kia Kaha: A Storybook of Māori Who Changed the World written by Stacey Morrison and Jeremy Sherlock (Penguin Random House New Zealand, 2021); Why is That Spider Dancing? written by Simon Pollard and Phil Sirvid (Te Papa Press, 2021)
2023	Te Wehenga: The Separation of Ranginui and Papatūānuku, Mat Tait (Allen & Unwin)
2023	A New Dawn written by Emeli Sione, illustrated by Darcy Solia (Mila’s Books, 2022): Freestyle: The Israel Adesanya Story David Riley, illustrated by Ant Sang (Reading Warrior, 2022): Sylvia and the Birds written by Johanna Emeney, illustrated by Sarah Laing (Massey University Press, 2022); Weather and Climate New Zealand, Sandra Carrod (Oratia Books, 2022)

== See also ==
- List of New Zealand literary awards
