= Miriama Kamo =

New Zealand television presenter

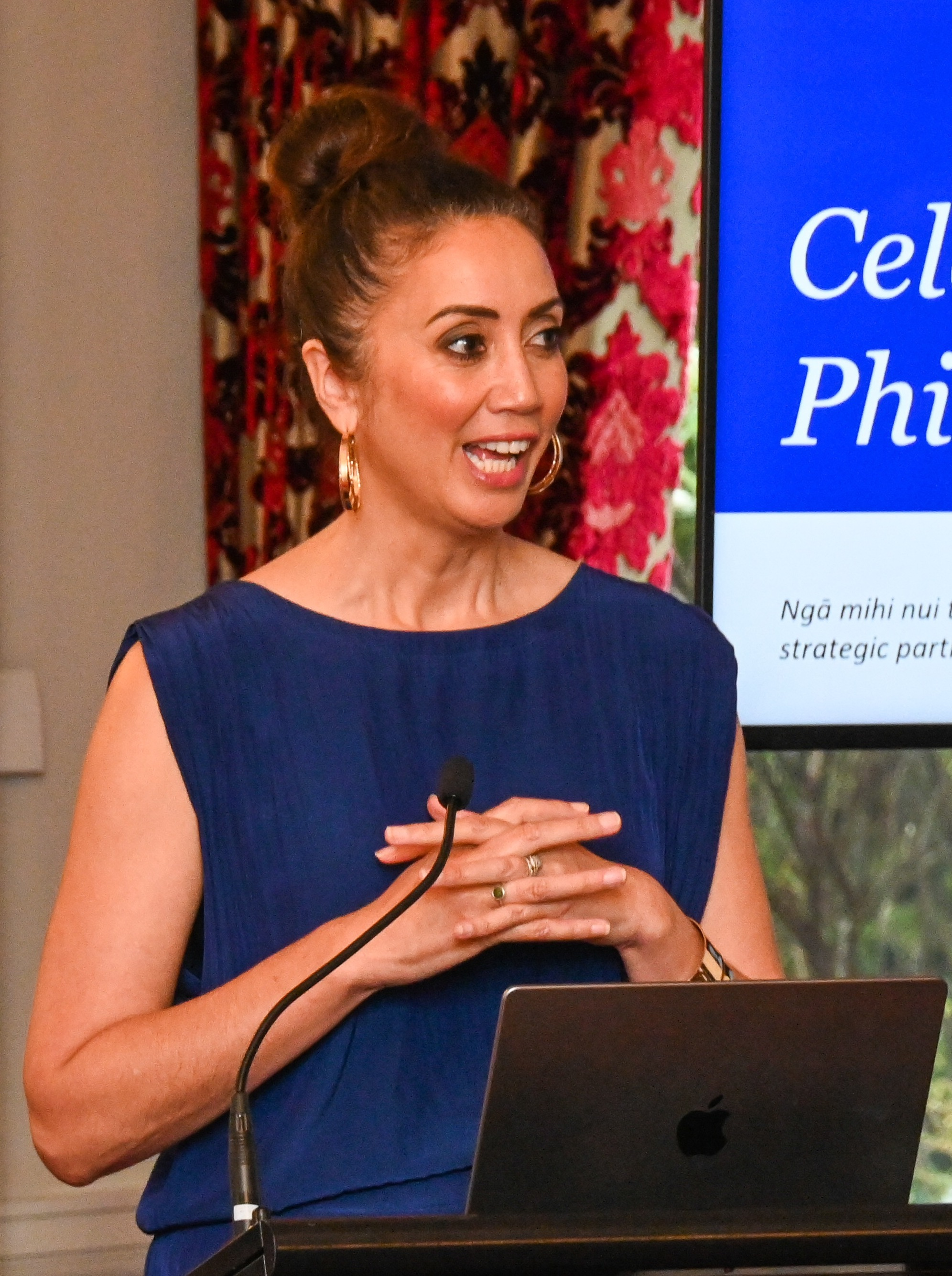
- Kamo in 2023
- Born: Miriama Jennet Kamo; 19 October 1973 (age 53); Christchurch, New Zealand

Miriama Jennet Kamo (born 19 October 1973) is a New Zealand journalist, children's author and television presenter. She currently presents TVNZ's Māori current affairs programme Marae and presented the current affairs programme Sunday between 2002 and 2024, when the show was cancelled.

== Early life ==
Miriama was born in Christchurch in 1973. She attended New Brighton Catholic Primary School and Aranui High School. She graduated from the University of Canterbury with a Bachelor of Arts in English in 1995.

== Career ==
Kamo studied at New Zealand Broadcasting School at CPIT (now Ara Institute of Canterbury) and within her first year, landed her first television job, as a reporter and presenter on children's science programme Get Real. She later moved to Wellington, where she worked as a reporter for the critically acclaimed arts and issues show backch@t; after that programme ended, she briefly moved to Sydney, where she held various jobs, eventually becoming assistant manager of an art gallery.

Kamo returned to New Zealand in 2001; in 2002, she joined Television New Zealand (TVNZ), becoming a reporter for current affairs programme, Sunday. She has also worked as a fill-in presenter for 1News and Breakfast. From 2005 to 2011, she hosted TVNZ's current affairs show 20/20; from 2008 to 2012, she was a weekend anchor for TVNZ 7's News at 8. In 2010, Kamo and fellow presenter Rawdon Christie anchored the live coverage of the aftermath of the 2010 Canterbury earthquake. From 2015 to 2016, Kamo hosted Kiwi Living, a lifestyle programme on TVNZ.

Since 2011, Kamo has been the host of TVNZ's current affairs shows Sunday, Māori current affairs programme Marae, and the online technology and innovation series Sunday Innovate.

Kamo writes for various publications, and her first children's book, The Stolen Stars of Matariki, was published by Scholastic in early 2018.

== Recognition ==
In 2005, Kamo won Best Current Affairs Reporter at the Qantas Television Awards for her investigation into alleged abuses at Porirua Hospital in the 1960s and 70s. The judging panel noted that she "demonstrated excellent reporter/talent rapport with strong interest and emotional content." Reflecting in 2022, Kamo commented that the programme on Porirua Hospital, which she did early in her career, was one of the stories that left the "biggest impression on her...[and]...was a watershed for her, not just as a journalist, but as a person."

In 2019, Stolen Stars of Matariki was a finalist in the New Zealand Post Book Awards, Children & Young Adults: Te Kura Pounamu Award for books written completely in te reo Māori. She was also a finalist in the New Zealand Book Awards for Children and Young Adults for the Wright Family Foundation Te Kura Pounamu Award with co-author Rangi Matamua, illustrator Isobel Joy Te Aho-White, and translators Pānia Papa and Leon Blake for their book Matariki ki te Ao in 2025.

Kamo won Best Reporter - Maori Affairs in the 2019 Voyager Media Awards for her work on two New Zealand television programmes, Marae and Sunday.

== Personal life ==
Kamo married consultant and Treaty of Waitangi negotiator Michael Dreaver in 2015; they have one daughter, born in 2011. She is of Ngāi Tahu and Ngāti Mutunga heritage.

== See also ==
- List of New Zealand television personalities
