= Jack Lasenby =

New Zealand writer (1931–2019)

- Born: John Millen Lasenby; 9 March 1931; Waharoa, New Zealand
- Died: 27 September 2019 (aged 88)
- Occupation: Writer

John Millen Lasenby (9 March 1931 – 27 September 2019), commonly known as Jack Lasenby, was a New Zealand writer. He wrote over 30 books for children and young adults, many of which were shortlisted for or won prizes. He was also the recipient of numerous awards including the Margaret Mahy Medal and Lecture Award in 2003 and the Prime Minister's Award for Literary Achievement for Fiction in 2014.

== Biography ==
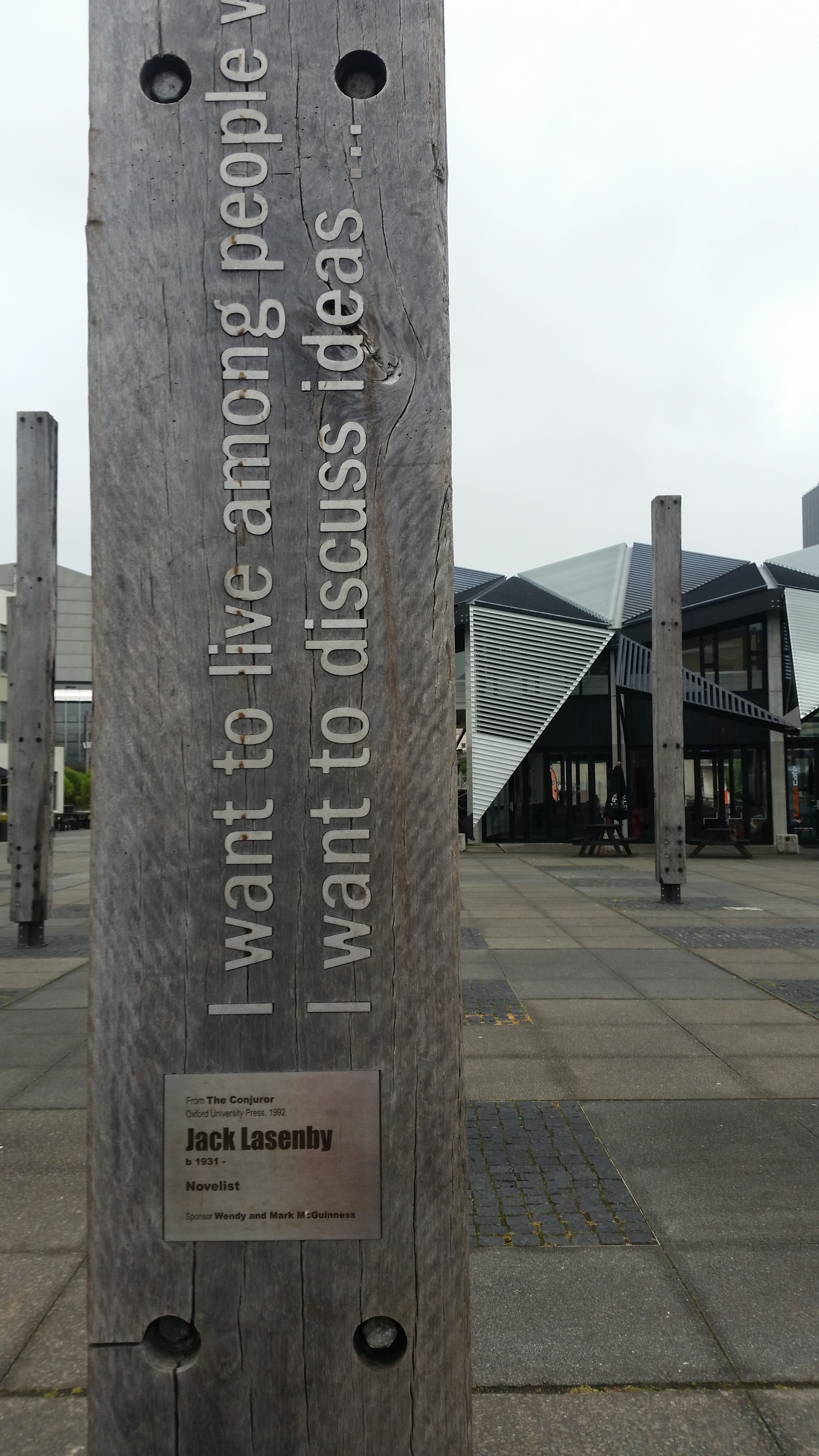
Quotation from The Conjuror by Jack Lasenby, Wellington Writers Walk, Wellington, New Zealand

Born on 9 March 1931 in Waharoa, a small farming community in the Waikato, Lasenby was the son of Linda Lasenby (née Bryce) and Owen Liberty Lasenby. He attended Waharoa Primary School and went on to Matamata Intermediate and Matamata College from 1943 to 1949.

From 1950 to 1952, he studied at Auckland University College, where he first met Margaret Mahy, who was also to become a notable New Zealand children's writer. He later described her as "one of the three most intelligent people I've known, a dear friend, and a continual source of laughter, and imaginative wonder". Mahy, in turn, described him as "perhaps the most innately New Zealand writer of all New Zealand writers for children".

As well as being (at various times) a postman, waterfront worker, gardener, fisherman and labourer, Lasenby spent about 10 years as a deer-culler and possum-trapper in Te Urewera where he sometimes said he got his education in the telling of tall tales around the camp fire. He was also a primary school teacher, editor of the New Zealand School Journal and lecturer of English at Wellington Teachers' College before retiring at 55 to become a full-time writer.

Lasenby's books are funny, witty, entertaining and imaginative. They include memorable and often hilarious characters such as Harry Wakatipu the talking horse, Aunt Effie and Uncle Trev, and range from tall tales and yarns to science fiction, dystopia and books set in the bush or in his own Depression-era childhood in small-town New Zealand. He recalled that "the Matamata district was alive with stories in my childhood, sad, funny, haunting".

Lasenby lived at Paremata near Wellington in the 1980s, where he sailed on the Porirua Harbour and Pauatahanui Inlet. With Sam Hunt and Ian Riggir they published poems on an 1886 upright press obtained from the Government Printing Office. He brought up his daughter and two stepchildren there.

Lasenby lived for many years in central Wellington and died on 27 September 2019, aged 88.

== Awards and prizes ==
Many of Lasenby's books were shortlisted for or won prizes or were named as Storylines Notable Books.

The Mangrove Summer won the Esther Glen Award in the 1989 LIANZA Children's Book Awards. The Waterfall was the junior fiction winner in the 1996 AIM Children's Book Awards.

The Battle of Pook Island won the junior fiction category of the 1997 New Zealand Post Children's Book Awards. Because We Were the Travellers won an honour award in the 1999 New Zealand Post Children's Book Awards. Taur won the senior fiction category in the 1999 New Zealand Post Children's Book Awards.

Aunt Effie and the Island that Sank won the junior fiction section of the 2005 New Zealand Post Children's Book Awards. Old Drumble won the junior fiction section of the 2009 New Zealand Post Children's Book Awards. Calling the Gods won the young adult section of the 2012 New Zealand Post Children's Book Awards.

Uncle Trev, first published in 1991, won the Storylines Gaelyn Gordon Award for a Much-Loved Book in 2012.

Lasenby was awarded the Buddle Findlay Sargeson Fellowship in 1991 and the Victoria University of Wellington writing fellowship in 1993. He was the University of Otago College of Education writer-in-residence in 1995.

The Jack Lasenby Award was established in his name in 2002 by the Wellington Children's Book Association. His standing in the literary world and his identity as a Wellington writer was also recognised with a plaque on the Wellington Writers Walk, unveiled by Governor-General Sir Jerry Mateparae on 21 March 2013.

In 2003, Lasenby was awarded the Margaret Mahy Medal and Lecture Award. He received the Prime Minister's Award for Literary Achievement for Fiction in 2014.

== Bibliography ==
- Lost and Found, photographs by Ans Westra (School Publications Branch, Dept of Education, 1970)
- 2 Grandfathers (Triple P Press, 1972)
- Chatham Islands, illustrated by Roger Hart (School Publications Branch, Dept of Education, 1973)
- Jackie Andersen (Triple P Press, 1973)
- Charlie the Cheeky Kea, ill. Nancy Finlayson (Golden Press, 1974)
- Rewi the Red Deer, ill. Nancy Finlayson (Golden Press, 1976)
- The Lake (Oxford University Press, 1987)
- The Mangrove Summer (Oxford University Press, 1988)
- Uncle Trev (Cape Catley, 1991)
- Uncle Trev and the Great South Island Plan (Cape Catley, 1991)
- Uncle Trev and the Treaty of Waitangi (Cape Catley, 1992)
- The Conjuror (Oxford University Press, 1992)
- Harry Wakatipu (McIndoe Publishers, 1993)
- Dead Man's Head (McIndoe Publishers, 1994)
- The Waterfall (Longacre Press, 1995)
- The Battle of Pook Island (Longacre Press, 1996)
- Because We were the Travellers [Travellers, Book One] (Longacre Press, 1997)
- Uncle Trev's Teeth and Other Stories (Cape Catley, 1997)
- Taur [Travellers, Book Two] (Longacre Press, 1998)
- The Shaman and the Droll [Travellers, Book Three] (Longacre Press, 1999)
- The Lies of Harry Wakatipu (Longacre Press, 2000)
- Kalik [Travellers, Book Four] (Longacre Press, 2001)
- Aunt Effie, ill. David Elliot (Longacre Press, 2002)
- Harry Wakatipu Comes the Mong (Puffin, 2003)
- Aunt Effie's Ark, ill. David Elliot (Longacre Press, 2003)
- Aunt Effie and the Island that Sank, ill. David Elliot (Longacre Press, 2004)
- What Makes a Teacher? (Four Winds Press, 2004)
- Mr Bluenose (Longacre Press, 2005)
- The Tears of Harry Wakatipu (Longacre Press, 2006)
- When Mum Went Funny (Longacre Press, 2006)
- Billy and Old Smoko (Longacre Press, 2007)
- Old Drumble (HarperCollins, 2008)
- Aunt Effie and Mrs Drizzle, ill. David Elliot (Longacre Press, 2008)
- The Haystack (HarperCollins, 2010)
- Calling the Gods (HarperCollins, 2011)
- Uncle Trev and his Whistling Bull (Gecko Press, 2012)
- Grandad's Wheelies, ill. Bob Kerr (Puffin Books, 2016)
