= Brianne Te Paa =

New Zealand children's author (born 1984

- Born: 1984 (age 40–41); Kaipara, New Zealand
- Occupation: Children's author; teacher
- Education: University of Auckland (BA); Te Wananga o Aotearoa
- Notable works: Kua Whetūrangitia A Koro

Brianne Te Paa (born 1984) is a New Zealand writer and schoolteacher. Her children's picture book Kua Whetūrangitia A Koro (also published in English as How My Koro Became a Star) received the Wright Family Foundation Te Kura Pounamu Award for the best children's book in the Māori language at the New Zealand Book Awards for Children and Young Adults in 2023.

== Early life, education and teaching career ==
Te Paa was born and grew up in South Kaipara, where she attended Kaipara College. After high school, she completed a full immersion course in te reo Māori. She has a bachelor's degree in education from the University of Auckland and a diploma in Te Pinakitanga ki Te Reo Kairangi from Te Wānanga o Aotearoa.

She has been teaching te reo Māori at Kaipara College since 2013, and as of 2023 is the school's deputy principal. She is part of the iwi (tribes) of Ngāti Kahu, Te Rarawa, Ngāti Whātua, Te Aitanga-a-Māhaki and Te Whānau-ā-Apanui.

== Kua Whetūrangitia A Koro ==
Te Paa's children's book, Kua Whetūrangitia A Koro, was published in 2022 by Huia Publishers and illustrated by Story Hemi-Morehouse. The book is about the love of a koro (grandfather) for his mokopuna (grandchildren) and features Matariki customs. She has said she was inspired to write the story after meeting Matariki expert Rangi Mātāmua and hearing him speak as part of her te reo language studies.

Kua Whetūrangitia A Koro won the Wright Family Foundation Te Kura Pounamu Award for a children's book in te reo Māori at the New Zealand Book Awards for Children and Young Adults in 2023. The judge's comments said:

Kua Whetūrangitia a Koro is a traditional Māori narrative tailored to fit a new world and a new audience. The significance of this story, its context, and its poetic use of te reo Māori place it in a stratosphere of its own.

The book also received the 2022 Storylines Te Kahurangi Kāterina Te Heikōkō Award for a te reo Māori book. Te Paa has said she was honoured to receive the award named for te reo language activist Kāterina Mataira.

An English language translation was published under the title of How My Koro Became A Star, and shortlisted for the best picture book award at the 2023 New Zealand Book Awards for Children and Young Adults. It was also listed as a 2022 Storylines Notable Book. In 2023 it won the NZ Booklovers Award for Best Children's Book.

The Spinoff said that the book "tackles the concept of death in a beautiful way: gently framing the deeply personal within the great stories written in the sky".
