= Rangi Mātāmua =

New Zealand academic

Rangi Mātāmua ONZM
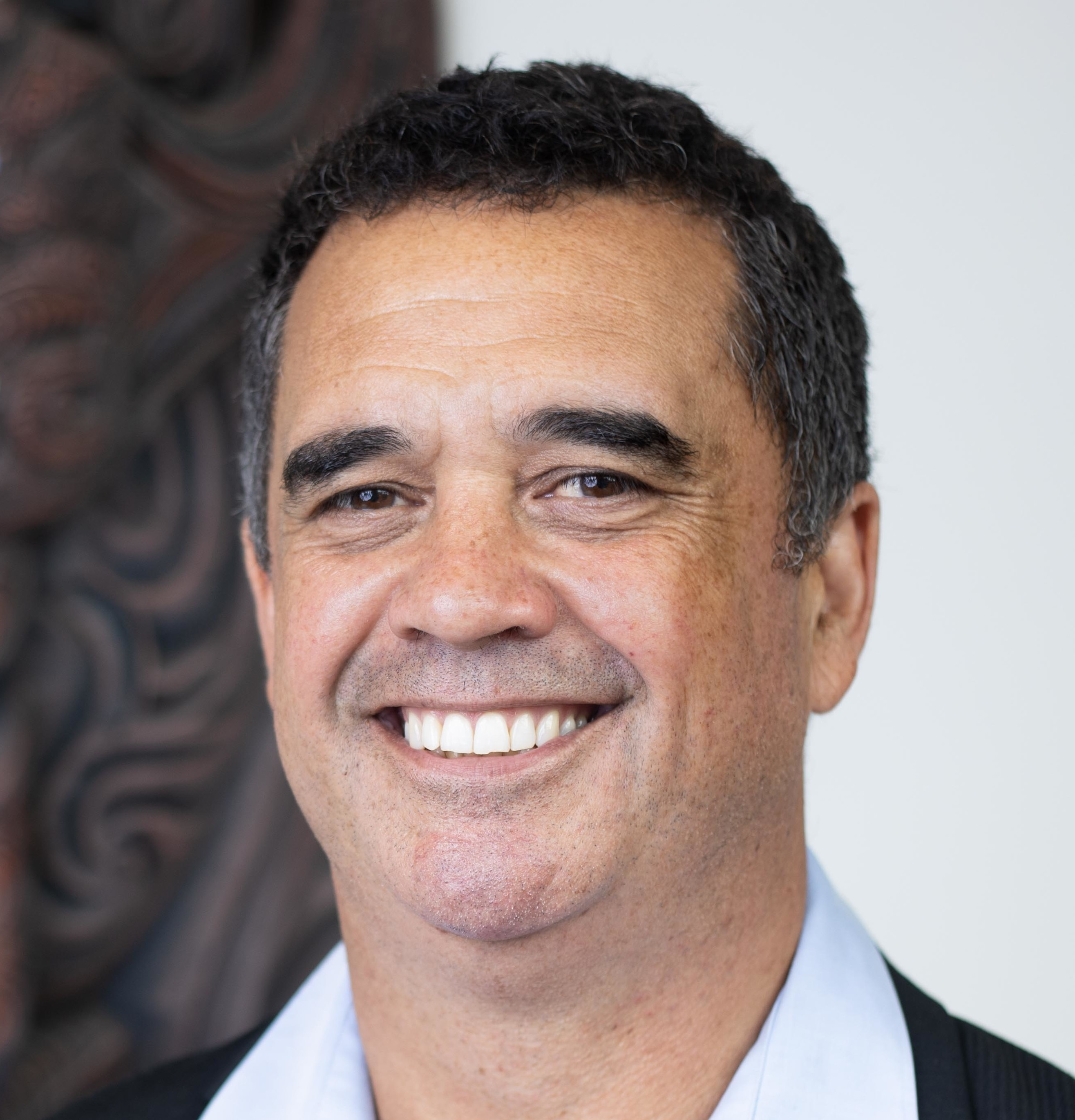
- Born: Palmerston North, New Zealand
- Education: Massey University
- Scientific career
- Fields: indigenous studies, astronomy
- Workplaces: Massey University
- Thesis: Te Reo Pāho: Māori radio and language revitalisation (2006)

Rangiānehu Mātāmua ONZM is a New Zealand indigenous studies and Māori cultural astronomy academic and is Professor of Mātauranga Māori at Massey University. He is the first Māori person to win a Prime Minister's Science Prize, is a fellow of the Royal Society Te Apārangi, and is the chief advisor to the New Zealand Government on the public holiday Matariki. He was named New Zealander of the Year in 2023.

== Education ==
Mātāmua was educated at Hato Paora College.

== Academic career ==
Mātāmua wrote his MA thesis on traditional Tūhoe weaponry. His 2006 PhD at Massey University was titled Te Reo Pāho: Māori radio and language revitalisation. Mātāmua moved to the University of Waikato, rising to full professor of Māori and Indigenous Studies. On 1 September 2021 he became Professor of Mātauranga Māori at Massey University's Te Pūtahi-a-Toi School of Māori Knowledge.

== Astronomy ==
Mātāmua's career in traditional Māori astronomy began in 1995 when, as a university undergraduate, he asked his grandfather Jim Moses (Timi Rāwiri Mātāmua) about Matariki, the Māori New Year heralded by the rising of the Pleiades at dawn. Timi Rāwiri produced from a cupboard a 400-page manuscript written in Te Reo Māori. The manuscript had been written over many years in the 19th century by Timi Rāwiri's grandfather Rāwiri Te Kōkau and father Te Kōkau Himiona Te Pikikōtuku, who was a tohunga of Tūhoe and Ngāti Pikiao. It was an astronomical record containing the names of 1000 stars and 103 constellations, as well as instructions for setting up a traditional house of astronomical learning or whare kōkōrangi. Timi Rāwiri told Mātāmua to share the knowledge it contained: "Knowledge hidden, he said, wasn't knowledge at all."

Mātāmua has since written widely on Matariki, identifying the nine stars that Māori perceived in the cluster, in contrast to the seven associated with the Pleiades in European tradition. His research has revealed that some of the Māori astronomical lore recorded by ethnographer Elsdon Best is slated or incorrectly translated. The translation of the word Matariki to mean "little eyes" is one such error; the name in fact is derived from Ngā mata o te ariki o Tāwhirimātea, the eyes of Tāwhirimātea, god of the winds. He has pointed out that the Matariki is often celebrated too early, when it is still below the horizon, as a result of a mismatch between the Gregorian solar calendar and the Māori lunar/stellar calendar, where the dates for Matariki change every year.

Mātāmua has been critical of the way Western scientific astronomy has ignored or belittled traditional Māori knowledge. He intends to establish a Māori observatory, based on a traditional observatory but incorporating modern knowledge and technology.

Mātāmua chairs the Matariki Advisory Group which has provided advice to the Government on the formation of New Zealand's newest public holiday, Matariki, which was first celebrated on Friday 24 June 2022. In October 2022 he was appointed to the newly-created position as chief advisor to the Government on Matariki.

== Science communication ==
Mātāmua regularly posts videos and podcasts on Māori astronomy in both English and Te Reo Māori, and has a large social media following: his Living by the Stars Facebook posts have over 20,000 followers, and his web series accumulated over one million views in four months. In 2019 he gave 21 presentations to a total audience of over 10,000 in New Zealand and Australia.

== Honours and awards ==
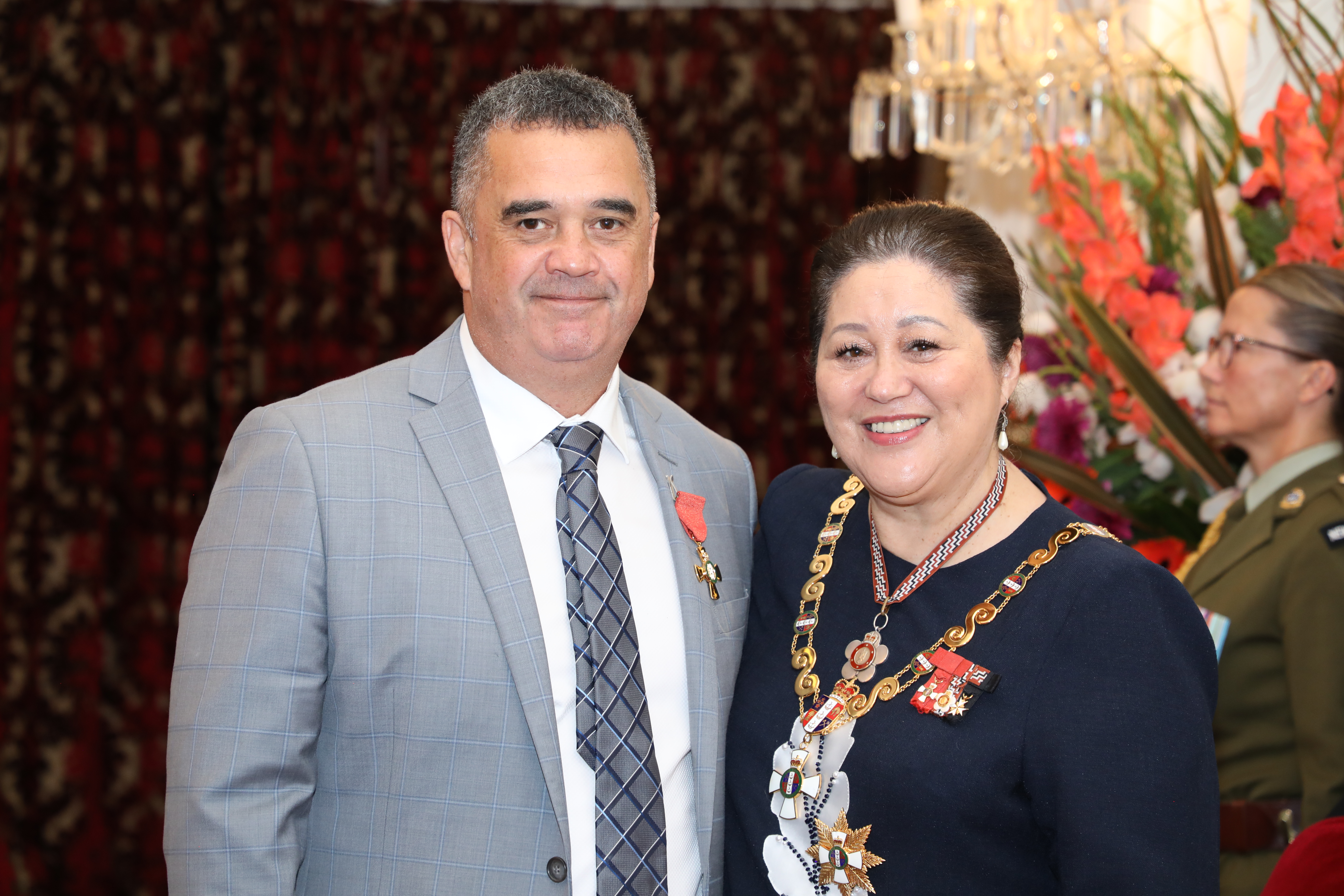
Mātāmua (left), after his investiture as an Officer of the New Zealand Order of Merit by the governor-general, Dame Cindy Kiro, at Government House, Wellington, on 24 May 2024

On 30 June 2020 Mātāmua was awarded the 2019 Prime Minister's Science Communication Prize for his work writing and speaking about Māori astronomy and Matariki. He is the first Māori scientist to be awarded the prize. He also won the 2020 Callaghan Medal for his work engaging the public at the boundary between science and traditional Māori knowledge. In March 2021, Mātāmua was awarded Fellowship of the Royal Society Te Apārangi, in recognition that his work "has revolutionised understandings of Māori astronomy, and in particular Matariki".

In the 2023 New Year Honours, Mātāmua was appointed an Officer of the New Zealand Order of Merit, for services to Māori astronomy. Mātāmua was named New Zealander of the Year in the 2023 Kiwibank New Zealander of the Year awards. In December 2023, he received an honorary doctorate of literature from Te Herenga Waka—Victoria University of Wellington. And he was a finalist in the New Zealand Book Awards for Children and Young Adults for the Wright Family Foundation Te Kura Pounamu Award with co-author Miriama Kamo, illustrator Isobel Joy Te Aho-White, and translators Pānia Papa and Leon Blake for their book Matariki ki te Ao in 2025.

Mātāmua's book, Matariki: The star of the year = Matariki: Te whetū tapu o te tau, published in 2017, was listed in Books of Mana as one of the 180 most significant works of Māori-authored non-fiction.

== Selected works ==
- Matamua, Rangi (2017). Matariki : the star of the year. Wellington, Aotearoa New Zealand: Huia. ISBN 978-1-77550-325-5. OCLC 978284746.
- Hinze, Annika; Taube-Schock, Craig; Bainbridge, David; Matamua, Rangi; Downie, J. Stephen (2015). "Improving Access to Large-scale Digital Libraries ThroughSemantic-enhanced Search and Disambiguation". Proceedings of the 15th ACM/IEEE-CS Joint Conference on Digital Libraries. Vol. 2015-June. ACM. pp. 147–156. doi:10.1145/2756406.2756920. hdl:10289/9570. ISBN 9781450335942. S2CID 1683393.
- Harris, Pauline; Matamua, Rangi; Smith, Takirirangi; Kerr, Hoturoa; Waaka, Toa (2013). "A review of Māori astronomy in Aotearoa-New Zealand". Journal of Astronomical History and Heritage. 16 (3): 325–336. Bibcode:2013JAHH...16..325H. doi:10.3724/SP.J.1440-2807.2013.03.08. S2CID 201087811.
- Timoti, Puke; Lyver, Philip O'B; Matamua, Rangi; Jones, Christopher J.; Tahi, Brenda L. (2017). "A representation of a Tuawhenua worldview guides environmental conservation". Ecology and Society. 22 (4): art20. doi:10.5751/ES-09768-220420. ISSN 1708-3087.
- Matamua, Rangi. (2012.) Evaluation of Whakapiki i te Reo a professional development programme for kaiako in Level 1 and Level 2 Māori medium settings. New Zealand Ministry of Education.
