= Courtney Meredith =

Courtney Meredith may refer to:

- Courtenay Meredith (1926–2024), Welsh international rugby union player
- Courtney Sina Meredith (born 1986), New Zealand poet, playwright and short story author
