= New Zealand Book Awards for Children and Young Adults =

New Zealand literary awards

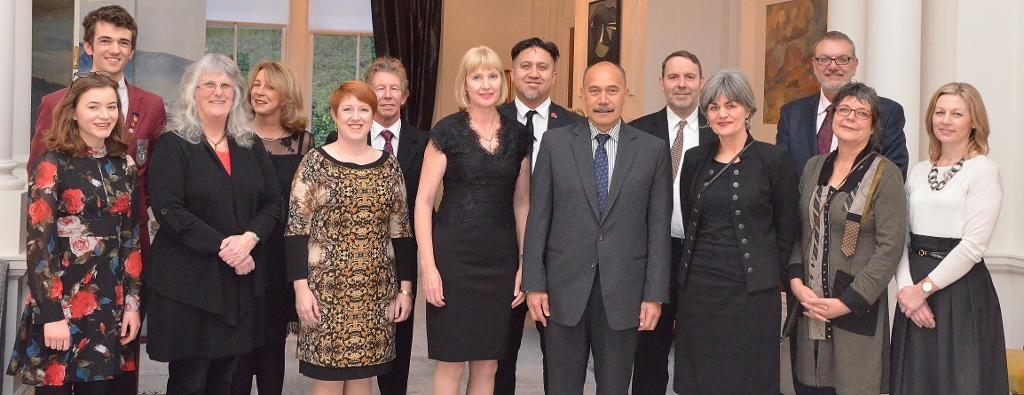
- The official party of the New Zealand Book Awards for Children and Young Adults in 2015
- Awarded for: Excellence in children and young adults' literature in New Zealand
- Date: 1982–present
- Country: New Zealand
- Presented by: New Zealand Book Awards Trust
- Reward: NZ$7,500 for each award
- Website: Official website

The New Zealand Book Awards for Children and Young Adults are a series of literary awards presented annually to recognise excellence in children's and young adults' literature in New Zealand. The awards were founded in 1982, and have had several title changes until the present title was introduced in 2015. In 2016 the awards were merged with the LIANZA children's book awards. As of 2023 the awards are administered by the New Zealand Book Awards Trust and each category award carries prize money of NZ$7,500.

== History ==
The awards began in 1982, as the New Zealand Government Publishing Awards, with two categories, Children's Book of the Year and Picture Book of the Year. A non-fiction award was presented in 1986, but not in 1987 or 1988, the final years of this incarnation of the awards.

No awards were presented in 1989. In 1990, Unilever New Zealand (then the New Zealand manufacturer of Aim toothpaste) restarted the awards as the AIM Children's Book Awards. There were two categories at that time, Fiction and Picture Book. Second and third prizes were originally awarded, though these were replaced with honour awards in 1993, presented at the judges' discretion. More categories were added over time: Best First Book in 1992 (not presented 1994–5); Non-Fiction in 1993, when Fiction was split into two categories (Senior Fiction and Junior Fiction); and AIM Book of the Year in 1995.

In 1997, the awards became the New Zealand Post Children's Book Awards, and another new category was added, the New Zealand Post Children's Choice award. In 2004, the Senior Fiction category was renamed to Young Adult Fiction and the name of the awards changed to New Zealand Post Book Awards for Children and Young Adults.

In 2015 the title of the awards changed to the New Zealand Book Awards for Children and Young Adults. At this time the awards were administered by Booksellers New Zealand, an industry organisation, and were presented at the end of a 10-day festival organised by the New Zealand Book Council each May.

In 2016, the awards merged with the Library and Information Association of New Zealand Aotearoa (LIANZA) Awards, and became administered by the New Zealand Book Awards Trust. As a consequence of the merge, the Junior Fiction category prize was combined with the LIANZA Esther Glen Award for junior fiction and the Non-Fiction award was combined with the LIANZA Elsie Locke Award for Non-Fiction. In addition, two new categories were introduced via the LIANZA Russell Clark Award for Illustration and the LIANZA Te Kura Pounamu Award for works written in te reo Māori (the Māori language).

== Prizes ==
As of 2023, the winners of the category awards are awarded NZ$7,500, with the New Zealand Post Margaret Mahy Book of the Year winner receiving an additional $7,500. The Picture Book prize money is split evenly between the author and the illustrator of the book. Winners of the Best First Book and New Zealand Post Children's Choice awards receive $2,000 each, and any finalists presented an Honour Award receive $500 each.

== Awards ==
=== Children's Book of the Year ===
Now called the New Zealand Post Margaret Mahy Book of the Year, this award is presented to a book "which, in the opinion of the judges, achieves outstanding excellence in all general judging criteria". As of 2013, winners receive $7,500 (in addition to the $7,500 prize for winning in their category). Currently called the New Zealand Post Children's Book of the Year award, this award was originally known as the New Zealand Children's Book of the Year Award, presented from 1982 to 1988. When the New Zealand Government Publishing Awards finished in 1988, the award ceased to exist until 1995, when the AIM Children's Book Awards established the AIM Book of the Year.

Winners of the Fiction category in 1990 to 1992, when there was no Book of the Year award and the only additional category was Picture Book (and Best First Book in 1992), have been considered Book of the Year winners.

Winners of the Children's Book of the Year award
Year	Book	Author(s)	Category	Reference(s)
**New Zealand Children's Book of the Year Award (1982–88); AIM Book of the Year (1995–96); New Zealand Post Children's Book of the Year (1997–)**
1982	The Silent One	Joy Cowley; ill. by Sherryl Jordan	N/A	
1983	The Halfmen of O	Maurice Gee	N/A	
1984	Jacky Nobody	Anne de Roo	N/A	
1985	Visitors	Caroline MacDonald; ill. by Garry Melson	N/A	
1986	Guardian of the Land	Joanna Orwin	N/A	
1987	The Keeper	Barry Faville	N/A	
1988	Alex	Tessa Duder	N/A	
1995	The Fat Man	Maurice Gee	Junior Fiction	
1996	Crossroads	Janice Marriott	Senior Fiction	
1997	The Bantam and the Soldier	Jennifer Beck; ill. by Robyn Belton	Picture Book	
1998	Dare Truth or Promise	Paula Boock	Senior Fiction	
1999	A Summery Saturday Morning	Margaret Mahy; ill. by Selina Young	Picture Book	
2000	The House that Jack Built	Gavin Bishop	Picture Book	
2001	Voyage with Jason	Ken Catran	Senior Fiction	
2002	The Plight of the Penguin	Lloyd Spencer Davis	Non Fiction	
2003	Weaving Earth and Sky: Myths and Legends of Aotearoa	Robert Sullivan; ill. by Gavin Bishop	Non Fiction	
2004	Bird in the Hand: Keeping New Zealand Wildlife Safe	Janet Hunt	Non Fiction	
2005	Clubs: A Lolly Leopold Story	Kate De Goldi; ill. by Jacqui Colley	Picture Book	
2006	Hunter	Joy Cowley	Junior Fiction	
2007	Illustrated History of the South Pacific	Marcia Stenson	Non Fiction	
2008	Snake and Lizard	Joy Cowley; ill. by Gavin Bishop	Junior Fiction	
2009	The 10pm Question	Kate de Goldi	Young Adult Fiction	
2010	Old Hu-Hu; Hū Hū Koroheke (Te Reo edition)	Kyle Mewburn and Rachel Driscoll; Te Reo ed. trans. by Kāterina Mataira	Picture Book	
2011	The Moon & Farmer McPhee	Margaret Mahy; ill. by David Elliot	Picture Book	
2012	Nice Day for a War	Matt Elliot; ill. by Chris Sloane	Non Fiction	
2013	Into the River	Ted Dawe	Young Adult Fiction	
2014	The Boring Book	Vasanti Unka	Picture Book	
2015	Singing Home the Whale	Mandy Hager	Young Adult Fiction	
2016	Anzac Heroes	Maria Gill; ill. by Marco Ivancic	Non Fiction	
2017	Snark	David Elliot (after Lewis Carroll)		
2018	Aotearoa: The New Zealand Story	Gavin Bishop	Non-Fiction	
2019	The Bomb	Sacha Cotter, ill. by Josh Morgan		
2020	Mophead: How Your Difference Makes a Difference	Selina Tusitala Marsh	Non-Fiction	
2021	Charlie Tangaroa and the Creature from the Sea	T. K. Roxborogh, ill. by Phoebe Morris	Fiction	
2022	Atua: Māori gods and heroes	Gavin Bishop	Fiction	
2023	Te Wehenga: The Separation of Ranginui and Papatūānuku	Mat Tait	Non-Fiction	
2024	Nine Girls	Stacy Gregg	Junior Fiction	
2025	The Treaty of Waitangi	Ross Calman	Non-Fiction	
2026	A Guide to Rocks	Sacha Cotter, ill. by Josh Morgan	Picture book	

=== Children's Choice ===
In 2015 for the first time, children chose the finalist list for the Children's Choice awards. With 6,000 students putting their votes in for all 149 of the titles submitted for the awards, the finalists were announced on 9 June. This began the second stage of voting, which saw just under 16,000 students post their votes for the Children's Choice winners.

Until 2014, the Children's Choice award was chosen from the finalists in all categories below by a public vote open to school aged children, and is considered one of the highest accolades in the awards. As of 2013 winners of the Children's Choice award receive a prize of $2,000.

The Children's Choice award was created at the first New Zealand Post Children's Book Awards in 1997, and has been presented every year since. Despite being open to finalists from all categories, as of 2013 all winners have been from the Picture Book category. From 2010 the winners of each category have also been announced.

Winners of the Children's Choice overall award
Year	Book	Author(s)	Category	Reference(s)
1997	Mechanical Harry	Bob Kerr	Picture Book	
1998	Alphabet Apartments	Lesley Moyes	**Picture Book**	
1999	The Life-Size Inflatable Whale	Gaelyn Gordon; ill. by John Tarlton	Picture Book	
2000	Hairy Maclary and Zachary Quack	Lynley Dodd	Picture Book	
2001	Oliver in the Garden	Margaret Beames, ill. by Sue Hitchcock	**Picture Book**	
2002	Grandpa's Shorts	Joy Watson, ill. by Wendy Hodder	Picture Book	
2003	Why Do Dogs Sniff Bottoms?	Dawn McMillan & Bert Signal; ill. by Ross Kinnaird	Picture Book	
2004	Oh Hogwash, Sweet Pea!	Ngāreta Gabel; ill. by Ali Teo & Astrid Jensen	Picture Book	
2005	The Other Ark	Lynley Dodd	Picture Book	
2006	Nobody's Dog	Jennifer Beck; ill. by Lindy Fisher	Picture Book	
2007	Kiss! Kiss! Yuck! Yuck!	Kyle Mewburn; ill. by Ali Teo & John O'Reilly	**Picture Book**	
2008	The King's Bubbles	Ruth Paul	Picture Book	
2009	The Were-Nana	Melinda Szymanik & Sarah Nelisiwe Anderson	Picture Book	
2010	The Wonky Donkey	Craig Smith; ill. by Katz Cowley	Picture Book	
2011	Baa Baa Smart Sheep	Mark Sommerset; ill. by Rowan Sommerset	Picture Book	
2012	The Cat's Pyjamas	Catherine Foreman	Picture Book	
2013	Melu	Kyle Mewburn; ill. by Ali Teo & John O'Reilly.	Picture Book	
2014	The Three Bears … Sort Of	Yvonne Morrison; ill. by Donovan Bixley	Picture Book	
Where categories are **bold** these books also won the category award.

Winners of Children's Choice categories
Year	Book	Author(s)	Category	Reference(s)
Overall Children's Choice award winners not included.
2010	Dear Alison: A New Zealand Soldier's Story from Stalag 383	Dudley Muff; ed. by Simon Pollard	Non-fiction	
2010	Friends: Snake and Lizard	Joy Cowley; ill. by Gavin Bishop	Junior Fiction	
2010	Brainjack	Brian Falkner	Young Adult Fiction	
2011	Who's Cooking Tonight?	Claire Gourley & Glenda Gourley	Non-fiction	
2011	Hollie Chips^{1}	Anna Gowan	Junior Fiction	
2011	Smiling Jack	Ken Catran	Young Adult Fiction	
2012	New Zealand Hall of Fame: 50 Remarkable Kiwis	Maria Gill; ill. by Bruce Potter	Non-fiction	
2012	Super Finn^{1}	Leonie Agnew	**Junior Fiction**	
2012	The Bridge^{H}	Jane Higgins	Young Adult Fiction	
2013	Kiwi: The Real Story	Annemarie Florian; ill. by Heather Hunt	Non-fiction	
2013	**My Brother's War**	David Hill	**Junior Fiction**	
2013	Snakes and Ladders	Mary-anne Scott	Young Adult Fiction	
2015	The Letterbox Cat and other poems	Paula Green;ill. by Myles Lawford	Non-fiction	
2015	The Anzac Puppy	Peter Millett;ill. by Trish Bowles	Picture Book	
2015	Monkey Boy	Donovan Bixley	Junior Fiction	
2015	Night Vision	Ella West	Young Adult Fiction	
2016	First to the Top	David Hill;ill. by Phoebe Morris	Non-fiction	
2016	Te Hua Tuatahi a Kuwi	Kat Merewether, translated by Pānia Papa	Te Reo Māori	
2016	The House on the Hill	Kyle Mewburn;ill. by Sarah Davis	Picture Book	
2016	The Girl Who Rode the Wind	Stacy Gregg	Junior Fiction	
2016	Stray	Rachael Craw	Young Adult Fiction	
Where categories are **bold** these books also won the category, ^{1} denotes a Best First Book award, and ^{H} denotes an Honour Award.

=== Best First Book ===
The Best First Book award is open to entrants in any of the categories below who are first‐time authors. As of 2012, winners in of the Best First Book award receive a prize of $2,000.

The Best First Book category was first included in the AIM Children's Book Awards in 1992, but was not awarded 1994–5. Since then, the award has been presented every year except 2001.

Winners of the Best First Book award
Year	Book	Author(s)	Category	Reference(s)
**Best First Book (1992–93, 1996–2000, 2002–)**
1992	Out Walked Mel	Paula Boock	Fiction	
1993	The Optimist^{H}	Bob Kerr	Junior Fiction	
1996	Laura's Poems	Laura Ranger	Junior Fiction	
1997	Reliable Friendly Girls	Jane Westaway	Senior Fiction	
1998	Trapped	Judy Knox	Junior Fiction	
1999	Footsteps of the Gods	**Hana Hiraina Erlbeck**; ill. by Manawa-Ote-Rangi	Junior Fiction	
2000	2MUCH4U	Vince Ford	**Junior Fiction**	
2002	Brodie	Joy Cowley, ill. by **Chris Mousdale**	**Picture Book**	
2003	Buddy	V. M. Jones	**Junior Fiction**	
2004	Thunder Road	Ted Dawe	**Young Adult Fiction**	
2005	Cross Tides	Lorraine Orman	Young Adult Fiction	
2006	The Unknown Zone	Phil Smith	Young Adult Fiction	
2007	The Three Fishing Brothers Gruff	Ben Galbraith	Picture Book	
2008	Out of the Egg	Tina Matthews	Picture Book	
2009	Violence 101	Denis Wright	Young Adult Fiction	
2010	The Bone Tiki	David Hair	Young Adult Fiction	
2011	Hollie Chips^{CC}	Anna Gowan	Junior Fiction	
2012	Super Finn^{CC}	Leonie Agnew	**Junior Fiction**	
2013	Reach	Hugh Brown	Young Adult Fiction	
2014	A Necklace of Souls	R. L. Stedman	Young Adult Fiction	
2015	Māori Art for Kids	Julie Noanoa and Norm Heke	Non-Fiction	
2016	Allis the Little Tractor	Sophie Siers; ill. by Helen Kerridge	Picture Book	
2017	The Discombobulated Life of Summer Rain	Julie Lamb	Junior Fiction	
2018	My New Zealand Story: Dawn Raid	Pauline (Vaeluaga) Smith		
2019	Art-tastic	Sarah Pepperle	Non-Fiction	
2020	#Tumeke!	Michael Petherick	Junior Fiction	
2021	Kōwhai and the Giants	Kate Parker	Picture Book	
2022	Spark Hunter	Sonya Wilson	Fiction	
2023	The Lighthouse Princess	**Susan Wardell** ill. by Rose Northey	Picture Book	
2024	Tsunami	Ned Wenlock		
2025	The Raven's Eye Runaways	Claire Mabey		
Where more than one author is listed, the Best First Book award recipient is listed in **bold**. Where categories are **bold** these books also won in their category, ^{H} denotes an Honour Award, and ^{CC} denotes a Children's Choice category winner.

== Categories ==
=== Picture Book ===
The Picture Book category is for titles in which the illustrations "carry the impact of the story" along with the text. These can be titles for children or young adults, but illustrations have to make up at least half of the content, and these illustrations must be original, not compiled from other sources. As of 2012, winners receive a prize of $7,500, split evenly between the author and the illustrator.

"Picture Book" is the only category to be included in every awards ceremony, and was first presented in 1982 as "Picture Book of the Year" in the New Zealand Government Publishing Awards. There were no awards ceremonies in 1989, but the category was resurrected in the first AIM Children's Book Awards in 1990 as "Picture Book", and has retained the name to this day.

Winners of the Picture Book category
Year	Book	Author(s)	Illustrator(s)	Reference(s)
**Picture Book of the Year (1982–98); Picture Book (1990–)**
1982	The Kuia and the Spider	Patricia Grace	Robyn Kahukiwa	
1983	Mr Fox	Gavin Bishop (retold by)	Gavin Bishop	
1984	Hairy Maclary from Donaldson's Dairy	Lynley Dodd	Lynley Dodd	
1985	The Fish of Our Fathers	Ron Bacon	R. H. G. Jahnke	
1986	Hairy Maclary Scattercat	Lynley Dodd	Lynley Dodd	
1987	Taniwha	Robyn Kahukiwa	Robyn Kahukiwa	
1988	Hairy Maclary's Caterwaul Caper	Lynley Dodd	Lynley Dodd	
1990	Annie and Moon	Miriam Smith	Lesley Moyes	
1991	My Cat Maisie	Pamela Allen	Pamela Allen	
1992	Hairy Maclary's Showbusiness	Lynley Dodd	Lynley Dodd	
1993	Lily and the Present	Christine Ross	Christine Ross	
1994	Hinepau	Gavin Bishop	Gavin Bishop	
1995	The Best-Loved Bear	Diana Noonan	Elizabeth Fuller	
1996	The Cheese Trap	Joy Cowley	Linda McClelland	
1997	**The Bantam and the Soldier**	Jennifer Beck	Robyn Belton	
1998	Alphabet Apartments^{C}	Lesley Moyes	Lesley Moyes	
1999	**A Summery Saturday Morning**	Margaret Mahy	Selina Young	
2000	**The House that Jack Built**	Gavin Bishop	Gavin Bishop	
2001	Oliver in the Garden^{C}	Margaret Beames	Sue Hitchcock	
2002	Brodie^{1}	Joy Cowley	Chris Mousdale	
2003	Pigtails the Pirate	David Elliot	David Elliot	
2004	Cuthbert's Babies	Pamela Allen	Pamela Allen	
2005	**Clubs: A Lolly Leopold Story**	Kate De Goldi	Jacqui Colley	
2006	A Booming in the Night	Benjamin Brown	Helen Taylor	
2007	Kiss! Kiss! Yuck! Yuck!^{C}	Kyle Mewburn	Ali Teo & John O'Reilly	
2008	Tahi – One Lucky Kiwi	Melanie Drewery	John O'Reilly & Ali Teo	
2009	Roadworks	Sally Sutton	Brian Lovelock	
2010	**Old Hu-Hu**; **Hū Hū Koroheke** (Te Reo edition)	Kyle Mewburn; Te Reo ed. trans. by Kāterina Mataira	Rachel Driscoll	
2011	**The Moon & Farmer McPhee**	Margaret Mahy	David Elliot	
2012	Rāhui	Chris Szekely; Te Reo ed. trans. by Brian Morris	Malcolm Ross	
2013	Mister Whistler	Margaret Mahy	Gavin Bishop	
2014	**The Boring Book**	Vasanti Unka		
2015	Jim's Letters	Glyn Harper	Jenny Cooper	
2016	The Little Kiwi's Matariki	Nikki Slade Robinson	Nikki Slade Robinson	
2017	That's Not a Hippopotamus!	Juliette MacIver	Sarah Davis	
2018	I am Jellyfish	Ruth Paul	Ruth Paul	
2019	**The Bomb**	Sacha Cotter	Josh Morgan	
2020	Abigail and the Birth of the Sun	Matthew Cunningham	Sarah Wilkins	
2021	Kōwhai and the Giants	Kate Parker	Kate Parker	
2022	Lion Guards the Cake	Ruth Paul	Ruth Paul	
2023	Duck Goes Meow	Juliette MacIver	Carla Martell	
2024	Paku Manu Ariki Whakatakapōkai	Michaela Keeble	Tokerau Brown	
2025	Titiro Look	Gavin Bishop, translated by Darryn Joseph	Gavin Bishop	
2026	**A Guide to Rocks**	Sacha Cotter	Josh Morgan	
Titles in **bold** also won the Children's Book of the Year award, ^{C} denotes a Children's Choice award, and ^{1} denotes a Best First Book award. Full list of finalists at AIM Children's Book Awards – Picture Book & New Zealand Post Picture Book on the Christchurch City Libraries website.

=== Non-fiction ===
The Non-fiction category is for titles in "which present well-authenticated data, with consideration given to imaginative presentation, interpretation and style". Titles for children or young adults can be included in this category, but not textbooks, resource kits, poetry, folklore, or retellings of myths and legends. As of 2012, winners in the Non-fiction category receive a prize of $7,500.

The Non Fiction category was added in 1986 to the New Zealand Government Publishing Awards, but removed again in 1987. The category was not resurrected until 1993, as part of the AIM Children's Book Awards. From 2008, the category's name has been hyphenated.

In 2016, when the awards merged with the LIANZA Awards, this category was merged with the Elsie Locke Award for Non-Fiction and renamed the Elsie Locke Non-Fiction Award.

Winners of the Non-fiction category
Year	Book	Author(s)	Reference(s)
**Non Fiction (1986, 1993–2007); Non-fiction (2008–)**
1986	The Story of New Zealand	Judith Bassett, Keith Sinclair and Marcia Stensen	
1993	Picture Magic	Chris Gaskin	
1994	Old Blue: The Rarest Bird in the World	Mary Taylor	
1995	Which Native Forest Plant?	Andrew Crowe	
1996	Aya's Story	Jenny Scown, photography by Trish Gribben	
1997	Picture Book Magic	Chris Gaskin, photography by Denis Page	
1998	The Know, Sow & Grow Kids' Book of Plants	Diana Noonan & Keith Olsen	
1999	The Natural World of New Zealand	Gerard Hutching	
2000	Te Wao Nui a Tāne	Hirini Melbourne; ill. by Te Maari Gardiner	
2001	The Zoo: Meet the Locals	Colin Hogg	
2002	**The Plight of the Penguin**	Lloyd Spencer Davis	
2003	**Weaving Earth and Sky: Myths and Legends of Aotearoa**	Robert Sullivan; ill. by Gavin Bishop	
2004	**A Bird in the Hand**	Janet Hunt	
2005	Welcome to the South Seas	Gregory O'Brien	
2006	Scarecrow Army: The Anzacs at Gallipoli	Leon Davidson	
2007	**Illustrated History of the South Pacific**	Marcia Stenson	
2008	Which New Zealand Spider?	Andrew Crowe	
2009	Back & Beyond: New Zealand Painting for the Young & Curious	Gregory O'Brien	
2010	E3 Call Home	Janet Hunt	
2011	Zero Hour: The Anzacs on the Western Front	Leon Davidson	
2012	**Nice Day for a War**	Matt Elliot; ill. by Chris Sloane	
2013	100 Amazing Tales from Aotearoa	Simon Morton & Riria Hotere	
2014	The Beginner's Guide to Hunting and Fishing in New Zealand	Paula Adamson	
2015	Mōtītī Blue and the Oil Spill	Debbie McCauley	
2016	**Anzac Heroes**	Maria Gill; ill. by Marco Ivancic	
2017	Jack and Charlie: Boys of the Bush	Jack Marcotte and Josh James Marcotte	
2018	**Aotearoa: The New Zealand Story**	Gavin Bishop	
2019	Art-tastic	Sarah Pepperle	
2020	**Mophead**	Selina Tusitala Marsh	
2021	Egg and Spoon: An illustrated cookbook	Alexandra Tylee, ill. by Giselle Clarkson	
2022	**Atua: Māori gods and heroes**	Gavin Bishop	
2023	**Te Wehenga: The Separation of Ranginui and Papatūānuku**	Mat Tait	
2024	Ultrawild: An audacious plan to rewild every city on Earth	Steve Mushin	
2025	**The Treaty of Waitangi**	Ross Calman	
Titles in **bold** also won the Children's Book of the Year award. Full list of finalists at AIM Children's Book Awards – Non-Fiction & New Zealand Post Non-Fiction on the Christchurch City Libraries website.

=== Fiction ===
The Fiction category is for works of creative writing, in which the text constitutes the "heart of the book". The category was added with the creation of the AIM Children's Book Awards in 1990, but was split into Junior Fiction and Senior Fiction in 1993. The name of the Senior Fiction category was later to change to Young Adult Fiction in 2004.

As of 2012, winners in either Fiction category receive a prize of $7,500.

Winners of the Fiction category in 1990 to 1992, when there was no Book of the Year award and the only additional category was Picture Book (and Best First Book in 1992), have been considered Book of the Year winners.

Winners of the Fiction category
Year	Book	Author(s)	Reference(s)
1990	Alex in Winter	Tessa Duder	
1991	Rocco	Sherryl Jordan	
1992	Bow Down Shadrach	Joy Cowley	
Full list of finalists at AIM Children's Book Awards – Fiction on the Christchurch City Libraries website.

==== Junior fiction ====
Created in 1993, this award is for works in the Fiction category whose intended audience are in Years 1–8 (primary and intermediate school) (See Education in New Zealand § Years of schooling).

Winners of the Junior Fiction category
Year	Book	Author(s)	Reference(s)
1993	Underrunners	Margaret Mahy	
1994	A Dolphin in the Bay	Diana Noonan	
1995	**The Fat Man**	Maurice Gee	
1996	The Waterfall	Jack Lasenby	
1997	The Battle of Pook Island	Jack Lasenby	
1998	Ticket to the Sky Dance	Joy Cowley	
1999	Starbright and the Dream Eater	Joy Cowley	
2000	2MUCH4U^{1}	Vince Ford	
2001	Shadrach Girl	Joy Cowley	
2002	Recycled	Sandy McKay	
2003	Buddy^{1}	V. M. Jones	
2004	Juggling with Mandarins	V. M. Jones	
2005	Aunt Effie and the Island that Sank	Jack Lasenby	
2006	**Hunter**	Joy Cowley	
2007	Thor's Tale: Endurance and Adventure in the Southern Ocean	Janice Marriott	
2008	**Snake and Lizard**	Joy Cowley, ill. by Gavin Bishop	
2009	Old Drumble	Jack Lasenby	
2010	The Loblolly Boy	James Norcliffe	
2011	Finnigan & the Pirates	Sherryl Jordan	
2012	Super Finn^{1}^{CC}	Leonie Agnew	
2013	My Brother's War^{CC}	David Hill	
2014	Dunger	Joy Cowley	
2015	Monkey Boy	Donovan Bixley	
2016	From the Cutting Room of Barney Kettle	Kate De Goldi	
2017	My New Zealand Story: Bastion Point	Tania Roxborogh	
2018	How to Bee	Bren MacDibble	
2019	The Dog Runner	Bren MacDibble	
2020	Lizard's Tale	Weng Wai Chan	
2021	**Charlie Tangaroa and the Creature from the Sea**	T. K. Roxborogh	
2022	The Memory Thief	Leonie Agnew	
2023	Below	David Hill	
2024	**Nine Girls**	Stacy Gregg	
2025	Detective Beans and the Case of the Missing Hat	Li Chen	
Titles in **bold** also won the Children's Book of the Year award, ^{1} denotes a Best First Book award, and ^{CC} denotes a Children's Choice category winner. Full list of finalists at AIM Children's Book; Awards – Fiction & New Zealand Post Junior Fiction on the Christchurch City Libraries website.

==== Young Adult Fiction ====
Created in 1993, and called Senior Fiction prior to 2004, this award is for works in the Fiction category whose intended audience are in Years 9–13 (secondary school).

Winners of the Young Adult Fiction category
Year	Book	Author(s)	Reference(s)
**Senior Fiction (1993–2003); Young Adult Fiction (2004–)**
1993	Songs for Alex	Tessa Duder	
1994	The Value of X	Pat Quinn	
1995	The Blue Lawn	William Taylor	
1996	**Crossroads**	Janice Marriott	
1997	Sanctuary	Kate De Goldi	
1998	**Dare Truth or Promise**	Paula Boock	
1999	Taur	Jack Lasenby	
2000	The Tiggie Tompson Show	Tessa Duder	
2001	**Voyage with Jason**	Ken Catran	
2002	Owl	Joanna Orwin	
2003	Alchemy	Margaret Mahy	
2004	Thunder Road^{1}	Ted Dawe	
2005	Malcolm and Juliet	Bernard Beckett	
2006	With Lots of Love from Georgia	Brigid Lowry	
2007	Genesis	Bernard Beckett	
2008	Salt	Maurice Gee	
2009	**The 10pm Question**	Kate De Goldi	
2010	Blood of the Lamb: The Crossing	Mandy Hager	
2011	Fierce September	Fleur Beale	
2012	Calling the Gods	Jack Lasenby	
2013	**Into the River**	Ted Dawe	
2014	Mortal Fire	Elizabeth Knox	
2015	**Singing Home the Whale**	Mandy Hager	
2016	Battlesaurus: Rampage at Waterloo	Brian Falkner	
2017	The Severed Land	Maurice Gee	
2018	In the Dark Spaces	Cally Black	
2019	Legacy	Whiti Hereaka	
2020	Aspiring	Damien Wilkins	
2021	The Pōrangi Boy	Shilo Kino	
2022	Learning to Love Blue	Saradha Koirala	
2023	Iris and Me	Philippa Werry	
2024	Catch a Falling Star	Eileen Merriman	
2025	The Paradise Generation	Sanna Thompson	
Titles in **bold** also won the Children's Book of the Year award, and ^{1} denotes a Best First Book award. Full list of finalists at AIM Children's Book Awards – Fiction & New Zealand Post Young Adult Fiction on the Christchurch City Libraries website. Finalist entries missing at the above sites are available at the awards' official website.

=== Illustration ===
The illustration award was added in 2016, when the Awards merged with the LIANZA Awards. It is named the Russell Clark award in honour of the New Zealand illustrator of that name.

Winners of the Illustration category
Year	Book	Author(s)	Illustrator	Reference(s)
2016	Much Ado About Shakespeare	Donovan Bixley	Donovan Bixley	
2017	Snark	David Elliott	David Elliott	
2018	Giants, Trolls, Witches, Beasts	Craig Phillips	Craig Phillips	
2019	Puffin the Architect	Kimberley Andrews	Kimberley Andrews	
2020	The Adventures of Tupaia	Courtney Sina Meredith	Mat Tait	
2021	Hare & Ruru: A Quiet Moment	Laura Shallcrass	Laura Shallcrass	
2022	Atua: Māori Gods and Heroes	Gavin Bishop	Gavin Bishop	
2023	A Portrait of Leonardo	Donovan Bixley	Donovan Bixley	
2024	Patu: The New Zealand wars	Gavin Bishop	Gavin Bishop	
2025	Hineraukatauri me Te Ara Pūoro	Elizabeth Gray	Rehua Wilson	
Full list of finalists at New Zealand Book Awards for Children and Young Adults – Russell Clark Award for Illustration and (for awards pre-2016) LIANZA Russell Clark Award on the Christchurch City Libraries website.

=== Te reo Māori ===
This award is currently called the Wright Family Foundation Te Kura Pounamu Award and is awarded to a book written entirely in (or translated entirely into) te reo Māori (the Māori language). It was introduced in 2016 when the Awards merged with the LIANZA Awards, and is judged separately by Te Rōpū Whakahau.

Winners of Te reo Māori category
Year	Book	Author(s)	Illustrator	Translator	Reference(s)
2016	Whiti te Ra!	Patricia Grace	Andrew Burdan	Kawata Teepa	
2017	Te Kaihanga Māpere	Sacha Cotter	Josh Morgan	Kawata Teepa	
2018	Tu Meke Tūī!	Malcolm Clarke	Hayley King	Evelyn Tobin	
2019	Te Haka a Tānerore	Reina Kahukiwa	Robyn Kahukiwa	Kiwa Hammond	
2020	Tio Tiamu	Kurahau	Laya Mutton-Rogers		
2021	Ngake me Whātaitai	Ben Ngaia	Laya Mutton-Rogers		
2022	I Waho, i te Moana	Yvonne Morrison	Jenny Cooper	Pānia Papa	
2023	Kua Whetūrangitia a Koro	Brianne Te Paa	Story Hemi-Morehouse		
2024	Nani Jo me ngā Mokopuna Porohīanga	Moira Wairama	Margaret Tolland	Moira Wairama	
2025	Hineraukatauri me Te Ara Pūoro	Elizabeth Gray	Rehua Wilson		
Full list of finalists at New Zealand Book Awards for Children and Young Adults – Wright Family Foundation Te Kura Pounamu Award for Te Reo Māori and (for awards pre-2016) LIANZA Te Kura Pounamu Award on the Christchurch City Libraries website.

Winners of Translated into Te Reo Māori category (from 2025)
Year	Book	Author(s)	Illustrator	Translator	Reference(s)
2025	A Ariā me te Atua o te Kūmara	Witi Ihimaera	Isobel Joy Te Aho-White	Hēni Jacob	
Full list of awards at New Zealand Book Awards for Young NZ Readers

== Honour Award and runners-up ==
Honour Awards are given at the judge's discretion to outstanding finalists that don't win in their category. As of 2012, finalists presented an Honour Award receive a prize of $500.

Honour Awards were first presented in 1993, while in 1990 to 1992 runners-up were awarded second and third prizes.

Winners of Honour Awards and Second Prizes
Year	Book	Author(s)	Category	Reference(s)
Second Prize (1990–92); Honour Award (1993–)
1990	The Champion	Maurice Gee	Fiction	
1990	The Story of the Kakapo, Parrot of the Night	Philip Temple; ill. by Chris Gaskin	Picture Book	
1991	Secrets	Ruth Corrin	Fiction	
1991	Lily and the Bears	Christine Ross	Picture Book	
1992	The Juniper Game	Sherryl Jordan	Fiction	
1992	My Aunt Mary Went Shopping	Roger Hall; ill. by Trevor Pye	Picture Book	
1993	The Optimist^{1}	Bob Kerr	Junior Fiction	
1993	The Conjuror	Jack Lasenby	Senior Fiction	
1993	Grandma McGarvey Paints the Shed	Jenny Hessell; ill. by Trevor Pye	Picture Book	
1994	The Ace of Diamonds Gang	Owen Marshall	Senior Fiction	
1994	Stretch, Bend and Boggle	Brian Stokes; ill. by Carolyn Smith	Non Fiction	
1995	The Emerald Encyclopedia	James Norcliffe	Senior Fiction	
1995	The Life Cycle of the Praying Mantis	Betty Brownlie	Non Fiction	
1995	Kotuku: The Flight of the White Heron	Philip Temple; ill. by Chris Gaskin	Picture Book	
1996	Take it Easy	David Hill	Junior Fiction	
1996	Joe's Ruby	Elsie Locke; ill. by Gary Hebley	Non Fiction	
1996	Tom's Story	Mandy Hager; ill. by Ruth Paul	Picture Book	
1998	Because We Were the Travellers	Jack Lasenby	Senior Fiction	
1999	Killer Moves	Denis Edwards	Junior Fiction	
1999	I Am Not Esther	Fleur Beale	Senior Fiction	
1999	Slinky Malinki Catflaps	Lynley Dodd	Picture Book	
2000	A Villain's Night Out	Margaret Mahy; ill. by Harry Horse	Junior Fiction	
2000	Closed, Stranger	Kate De Goldi	Senior Fiction	
2000	Sydney and the Sea Monster	David Elliot	Picture Book	
2001	The Lies of Harry Wakatipu	Jack Lasenby	Junior Fiction	
2001	24 Hours	Margaret Mahy	Senior Fiction	
2001	Dragor, Or, How a Dragon Suffering from Prickly Heat Saved the World from Perpetual; Winter and Established a Well-known Weed	Pat Quinn; ill. by Philip Webb	Picture Book	
2004	Napoleon and the Chicken Farmer	Lloyd Jones; ill. by Graeme Gash	Picture Book	
2006	Sil	Jill Harris	Junior Fiction	
2006	Kaitangata Twitch	Margaret Mahy	Young Adult Fiction	
2006	Blue New Zealand	Glenys Stace	Non Fiction	
2006	Haere – Farewell, Jack, Farewell	Tim Tipene; ill. by Huhana Smith	Picture Book	
2007	A Present from the Past	Jennifer Beck; ill. by Lindy Fisher	Picture Book	
2008	The Sea-wreck Stranger	Anna Mackenzie	Young Adult Fiction	
2008	Reaching the Summit	Alexa Johnston & David Larsen	Non-fiction	
2008	To the Harbour	Stanley Palmer	Picture Book	
2009	Piggity-Wiggity Jiggity Jig	Diana Neild; ill. by Philip Webb	Picture Book	
2010	The Word Witch	Margaret Mahy; ill. by David Elliot; ed. by Tessa Duder	Picture Book	
2012	The Travelling Restaurant	Barbara Else	Junior Fiction	
2012	The Bridge	Jane Higgins	Young Adult Fiction	
2012	Digging Up The Past: Archaeology for the Young & Curious	David Veart	Non-fiction	
2012	Shaolin Burning	Ant Sang	Picture Book	
2013	The Queen and the Nobody Boy: A Tale of Fontania	Barbara Else	Junior Fiction	
2014	Bugs	Whiti Hereaka	Young Adult Fiction	
^{1} Denotes a Best First Book award. Third Prize winners (1990–2) can be found at AIM Children's Book Awards 1990 – 1996 on the Christchurch City Libraries website.

== See also ==
- Ockham New Zealand Book Awards
- Esther Glen Award
- Margaret Mahy Award
- Joy Cowley Award
- List of New Zealand literary awards
