= Mandy Hager =

New Zealand writer

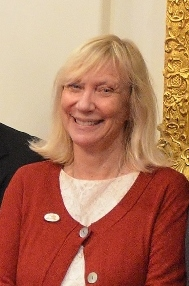
- Hager at the New Zealand Book Awards for Children and Young Adults 2015
- Born: 26 July 1960 (age 66); Levin, New Zealand
- Education: MA in creative writing from Victoria University of Wellington
- Occupation: Writer
- Children: 2
- Relatives: Nicky Hager

Amanda Hager (born 26 July 1960) is a writer of fiction and non-fiction for children, young adults and adults. Many of her books have been shortlisted for or won awards, including Singing Home the Whale which won both the Young Adult fiction category and the Margaret Mahy Book of the Year in the New Zealand Book Awards for Children and Young Adults in 2015. She has been the recipient of several fellowships, residencies and prizes, including the Beatson Fellowship in 2012, the Katherine Mansfield Menton Fellowship in 2014, the Waikato University Writer in Residence in 2015 and the Margaret Mahy Medal and Lecture Award in 2019.

== Biography ==
Hager was born in Levin on 26 July 1960. Her father, Kurt, was born in Vienna and her mother, Barbara, in Zanzibar. She is the third of four children who grew up in a household where books, reading and writing were encouraged and valued. She has said she and her siblings were all raised with a strong sense of social justice.

Hager has worked as a primary teacher, teacher of people with learning difficulties, youth education officer, research assistant, research and resource writer and creative writing tutor. She has a Teaching Diploma (Wellington College of Education), an Advanced Diploma in Applied Arts (Whitireia New Zealand) and an MA in creative writing from Victoria University of Wellington.

Her first published book, Tom's Story, was written after the death of her first husband in a boating accident, when she was trying to find picture books that would help her own children understand the nature of death and the emotions they were feeling. Since then, her books have often tackled difficult subjects such as grief, anger, violence, physical and emotional abuse, suicide and self-harm, racism, sexism, bullying and environmental issues.

She writes predominately for young adults, although a shift in 2017 saw her publish Heloise (Penguin NZ), a historical novel based on the life of 12th century nun Heloise d'Argenteuil, famed lover of philosopher Peter Abelard. In 2015 her book Singing Home The Whale (Random House NZ) won the Margaret Mahy Book of the Year and the Young Adult Fiction Category in the NZ Book Awards for Children and Young Adults, as well as a Storylines Notable Book Award and was a finalist in the LIANZA Book Awards. Her Blood of the Lamb trilogy has been published in the US by Pyr Books.

She also writes adult fiction, short stories, non-fiction, educational resources, blogs and articles. She has had work published in various journals including Fresh, Broadsheet and the 4th floor Literary Journal, and has written many educational resources for Learning Media and other publishers. Her work as a resource writer for the Global Education Centre dealt with topics such as "Weather Wars – The Politics of Climate Change, Parihaka and the gift of non-violent resistance", "Healing the World – Back to the Future", "Get Up! Stand Up! Music For Change", "Take Action, Money Matters", "Who Are You: the search for self in the Global Village?", "Cook Me Some Eggs, Woman! (Violence Against Women)" and "Slaves to Fashion: the threads that bind us".

She has run many creative writing workshops, is a frequent visitor to schools and has appeared at numerous literary festivals, including the National Writers Forum, the Auckland Writers Festival and Verb Wellington.

Hager worked for ten years as a tutor and mentor on the Creative Writing Programme at Whitireia New Zealand until the Novel Writing course she taught was disestablished.

She is married with two children and two grandchildren, and lives on the Kāpiti Coast. She is a sister to Nicky Hager, a prominent investigative writer and journalist.

== Awards and prizes ==
Many of Mandy Hager’s books have been shortlisted for or won awards. She has won the LIANZA Book Award for Young Adult fiction three times, the New Zealand Post Book Award for Young Adult fiction, an Honour award in the Aim Children's Book Awards, Word Weavers Excellence Award (2002), Golden Wings Award (2003) and five Storylines Notable Book Awards.

Tom’s Story received an Honour Award in the Picture Book category of the 1996 AIM Children’s Book Awards. Juno Lucina received a Golden Wings Excellence Award in 2002 and Run for the Trees received a Golden Wings Award in 2003.

Smashed won the Esther Glen Award in the 2008 LIANZA Book Awards. The Crossing won the Young Adult Fiction category of the New Zealand Post Children’s Book Awards in 2010.

Into the Wilderness was nominated for the Best Young Adult novel in the Sir Julius Vogel Awards in 2011.

The Nature of Ash won the Young Adult fiction section of the LIANZA Book Awards in 2013 and Dear Vincent won the same section in the LIANZA Book Awards in 2014. Singing Home the Whale won both the Young Adult fiction category and the Margaret Mahy Book of the Year in the New Zealand Book Awards for Children and Young Adults in 2015, as well as an IBBY Honour Book in 2016.

Heloise spent several weeks on the bestseller list and was longlisted for the 2018 Ockham Book Awards.

She has been the recipient of a number of awards and residencies, including the Beatson Fellowship in 2012, the University of Waikato Writer in Residence in 2015 and the D’Arcy Writer’s Grant in 2017.

On 7 November 2013, it was announced that Hager had been awarded the 2013 Katherine Mansfield Menton Fellowship. The prize provides for a NZD$75,000 award and the opportunity to take up residency for at least six months in Menton, a port town on the French Riviera and is one of New Zealand's most long-standing and prestigious literary awards.

In 2019, Hager also received the Margaret Mahy Medal and Lecture Award, which acknowledges lifetime achievement and a distinguished contribution to New Zealand’s literature for young people. She delivered her lecture, titled “Channelling our greater good", on 31 March 2019.

== Bibliography ==
Children’s and YA fiction

- Tom’s Story, illustrated by Ruth Paul (Mallinson Rendel, 1995) Also produced for "Ears" National Radio, 1995; Won an Honour Award in the Picture Book Category of the AIM Children's Book Awards, 1996
- Run for the Trees (Steele Roberts, 1999) Endorsed by David Bellamy and Paula Boock (Longacre Press); Shortlisted for "CanRead 2000; 2003. Re-published by Wings Press, USA; Golden Wings Award (Publishers Award) May 2003
- Smashed (Random House, 2007) (US Edition, Pyr Books, 2013) Named a 2008 Notable Book by the Children's Literature Charitable Trust; Winner of the Esther Glen Medal in the 2008 LIANZA Children's Book Awards for the most distinguished book written for children/young adults in that year.
- The Crossing [Blood of the Lamb, book one] (Random House, 2009) Winner of the 2012 NZ Post Children's Book Awards YA Fiction Category
- Into the Wilderness [Blood of the Lamb, book two] (Random House, 2010) (U.S. Edition Pyr Books, 2014)
- Resurrection [Blood of the Lamb, book three] (Random House, 2011) (US Edition, Pyr Books, 2014)
- The Nature of Ash (Random House, 2012)
- Dear Vincent (Random House NZ, 2013) (Slovenian edition 2015)
- Singing Home the Whale (Random House NZ, 2014) 2014 Margaret Mahy Book of the Year, 2014 Best YA Fiction (NZ Book Awards for Children and Young Persons), IBBY Honour Award, Notable Book Award
- Ash Arising (Penguin, 2018)
- Gracehopper (One Tree House, 2024)

Children’s non-fiction

- Hindsight (One Tree House, 2019)

Adult fiction

- Juno Lucina (Wings Press, USA, 2002)
- Heloise (Penguin Random House NZ, 2017)

Educational publications

- Stumpy’s Secret, ill. David Elliot (Learning Media, 2000) Short Novel; subbed to HarperCollins UK, 2003
- Double Danger, ill. Don DeMacedo (Learning Media, 2000) Short Novel; subbed to HarperCollins UK, 2003
- Stuck!, ill. Greg Broadmore (Learning Media, 2002)
- Wood Stork Swamp, ill. Annabel Craighead (Learning Media, 2004)
- Help, my Brain Hurts!: a guide to understanding and supporting learners with specific learning differences (Essential Resources, 2004)
- DARE to be you: facilitator’s guide (DARE Foundation of NZ, 2005) Five integrated resources written exclusively for The DARE Foundation of New Zealand, based around Run for the Trees; Modules include: Family Issues, Disability Issues, Self Esteem, Celebrating Diversity and Conservation Issue.
- DARE To Move On (2007) A programme for use by the DARE Foundation of New Zealand, based around the book "Smashed" – for use with young people at risk.
- Various short stories and books, contracted by Learning Media NZ Ltd (2000–06) including: Spoiled by Oil (Orbit Double Take Series, August 2003) Wood Stork Swamp (Orbit Double Take Series, Jan 2003); The Oak Tree Kids (Environment Series, 2001); Stuck! (Orbit Additions Series 2001); The Mystery of the Midnight Muncher (Orbit 4 Collections, 2001); Creepy Rats and Scaredy-cats (Orbit Themed Collections, 2001); Sweet Peas (Part 1 Journal, 2001); The Terrible Techno Turn-off (School Journal publication 2003); Beating the Frost (2004); Slot Canyons (2004); Tire Fire – Disasters (Orbit Collections G5; 2004); Transforming Trash (Powerzone 2005); Oils Well That Ends Well (Orbit Collections; 2006); Energy of the Future (Orbit Collections, 2006); People Power (Orbit Investigations, 2006).

Film scripts

- Crossing the Boundaries Full length Feature Film Script – Runner-up, Feature Film Screenwriting Competition, River City Film Festival, 2003. (Film Wanganui Trust)
- Smashed Full-length film script adaptation – Finalist, Moondance International Film Festival, USA, 2008

Global Education Centre

- The Next (2005) An extensive 38,000-word resource for the Global Education Center ('providing an innovative approach for engaging young people in an exploration of social justice and global issues through hip hop.')
- Slaves to Fashion – The threads that bind us Global Bits resource – [www.globaled.org.nz]
- Healing the World – Back to the Future Global Bits resource – [www.globaled.org.nz]
- Get Up! Stand Up! Music For Change Global Bits resource – [www.globaled.org.nz]
- Weather Wars – The Politics of Climate Change" Global Bits resource – [www.globaled.org.nz]
- Cook Me Some Eggs, Woman! (Violence Against Women) Global Bits resource – [www.globaled.org.nz]
- Who Are You in the Global Village? (Identity Issues) as above
- Take Action as above
- Money Matters as above
- Parihaka and the gift of non-violent resistance as above
