= Pat Quinn (writer) =

New Zealand children's writer (born 1947)

Pat Quinn (born 20 May 1947) is a New Zealand writer of children's books and short stories.

== Early life and education ==
Quinn was born on 20 May 1947 in Wellington. She has a BSc in science (1967) from Victoria University of Wellington, and a diploma in communications (1992), and was a computer systems analyst.

== Writing career ==
After Quinn's children had started school she attended classes on writing and "began to write stories, articles and plays".

== Awards ==
Quinn won the Farmers Mutual Group short story competition, for "The Zucchini Story", in about 1989. She was a finalist in the 1993 LIANZA Young People's Non-Fiction Award with Moving the Earth; won the senior fiction award of the 1994 AIM Children's Book Awards for The Value of X, her first novel for young adults; and won an Honour Award in the 2001 NZ Post Children's Book Awards. All three of these awards were former versions of the New Zealand Book Awards for Children and Young Adults).

== Selected publications ==
- Moving the Earth (1993)
- Kirsty and Lionel (1966)
- Too Chicken (1997)
- Go, Horatio (1998)
- Dragor (2000, Scholastic: ISBN 1-86943-456-0)
- Ratz (2002, Scholastic: ISBN 1-86943-409-9)
- Starz (2004,, Scholastic: ISBN 1-86943-617-2)
