= David Elliot (illustrator) =

New Zealand illustrator

- Born: 1952 (age 73–74); Ashburton, New Zealand
- Education: University of Canterbury
- Occupation: Illustrator
- Website: flyingwhale.co

David Elliot (born 1952) is a New Zealand illustrator and author, known internationally for his contributions to the Redwall fantasy series by British author, Brian Jacques.

== Biography ==
Elliot was born in 1952 in Ashburton, New Zealand. He has a fine arts diploma in painting, from the University of Canterbury, in Christchurch, and is also a qualified school teacher. He lives in Port Chalmers, Dunedin.

== Publications ==
Elliot illustrated six Redwall books, as well as the Mossflower Anniversary Edition (with full-page illustrations), all written by UK author Brian Jacques. He also illustrated the second and third volumes of Jacques' Castaways of the Flying Dutchman series and American author, T. A. Barron's Great Tree of Avalon series, beginning with Child of the Dark Prophecy. Other international collaborations include providing illustrations for Time magazine editor Jeffrey Kluger's first book for children, Nacky Patcher and the Curse of the Dry-Land Boats (2007), three books in the Ranger's Apprentice series, by John Flanagan (2011, 2014) and two books in the Nethergrim series, by Matthew Jobin (2014, 2017). Elliot also provided the map and interior illustration for Jonathan W. Stokes' book, Addison Cooke and the Treasure of the Incas (2016).

Elliot has written and illustrated eight picture books of his own, including Henry's Map which was chosen by the School Library Journal for its Best Books in 2013 and Pigtails the Pirate which won the Picturebook category of the New Zealand Post Children's Book Awards in 2003. Other New Zealand publications include illustrations for Janet Frame's only book for children, Mona Minim and the Smell of the Sun and also The Smell of Powder, a book on New Zealand dueling, by Dr. Donald Kerr, both published in 2006. Elliot has also illustrated for Joy Cowley, Jack Lasenby and other New Zealand writers, poets and short story writers. As a great admirer of Lewis Carroll Elliot also produced illustrations for The Hunting of the Snark (Private Press edition, with the University of Otago in Dunedin, 2006). Elliot has also collaborated on two books with New Zealand's best loved children's writer and winner of the Hans Christian Andersen Award, Margaret Mahy, The Word Witch and The Moon and Farmer McPhee, which won the award for the best children's book in the New Zealand Post Children's Book Awards in 2011.

More recently, Elliot wrote and illustrated Snark: being a true history of the expedition that discovered the Snark and the Jabberwock…and its tragic aftermath (after Lewis Carroll), published by Otago University Press (2016). The book won Best Book and Best Illustrations in the New Zealand Book Awards for Children and Young Adults in 2017. and also a White Raven Award. His latest picture book is Oink (Gecko Press, 2018) and in 2019 he illustrated Tessa Duder's First Map: How James Cook Chartered Aotearoa New Zealand.

== Selected activities and awards ==
- 2000 University of Otago / Creative New Zealand Children's Writer in Residence
- 2011 Winner of the New Zealand Post Book Awards - Best Children's Book (together with Margaret Mahy) for The Moon and Farmer McPhee
- 2011 Inaugural Mallinson Rendel Award, to be awarded to New Zealand children's book illustrators every other year
- 2012 IBBY (International Board on Books for Young People) Honour List 2012 for The Moon and Farmer McPhee
- 2013 School Library Journal (USA) Best Books List for Henry's Map
- 2014 IBBY (International Board on Books for Young People) Honour List for The Word Witch
- 2014 Storylines Margaret Mahy Award. Award given annually for lifetime achievement in children's writing and illustration
- 2017 Winner of White Raven Award for Snark
- 2017 Winner of the New Zealand Book Awards for Children and Young Adults - Margaret Mahy Book of the Year for Snark
- 2017 Winner of the New Zealand Book Awards for Children and Young Adults - Russell Clark Award for Illustration for Snark
