= Veronika Meduna =

Veronika Meduna CF is a scientist, science journalist and broadcaster who was the founding New Zealand editor of The Conversation.

== Early life ==
Meduna was born in Czechoslovakia and spent her childhood there before moving with her family to Germany.

== Career ==
Meduna trained and worked as a microbiologist before moving into science journalism. She is best known as the long-serving producer and presenter of the Our Changing World science show on Radio New Zealand, producing and presenting hundreds of episodes of the show.

=== Science ===
Between 1988 and 1990, she was a research assistant at the University of Konstanz in the "Microbial Ecology Working Group" and subsequently, until 1992, as a scientist at the Konstanz-based Bio System GmbH. There, she dealt with soil microbiology, investigated, among other things, the potential of earth microbes for the purification of contaminated soil and developed a technique for the biological removal of pollutants. In 1992, Meduna held two positions as a research associate: On the one hand, she was involved in the extraction and refining of algentoxins at the University of Bremen (now known as the Center for Environmental Research and Sustainable Technologies) and also contributed to a study that was to assess the environmental factors responsible for the planting of the algal bloom. In addition, she participated in the Department of Zoology, Wildlife Management at the University of Otago, on a comprehensive observation of New Zealand seabirds on the Otago Peninsula.

=== Journalism ===
She joined Radio New Zealand in 1999 as a science reporter covering the Royal Commission on Genetic Modification before hosting Our Changing World. Alongside her broadcast career, Meduna has been an award winning science writer, contributing to publications such as the New Zealand Listener, New Zealand Geographic and New Scientist.

She left RNZ in 2016 as part of a major restructure at the broadcaster and worked as a freelance journalist before joining The Conversation in May 2017.

She spent time at Oxford University as a Chevening David Low Fellow.

Meduna won the Elsie Locke Award for Non-Fiction at the 2009 LIANZA awards and was shortlisted for the 2013 Royal Society of New Zealand Science Book Prize. In 2021, Meduna was awarded a Churchill Fellowship to travel to Micronesia, Melanesia and Australia, to carry out research for a book on the settlement of the Pacific.

== Personal life ==
She lives and works in Wellington, New Zealand.

== Selected works ==
- Towards a Warmer: What Climate Change Will Mean For New Zealand's Future World, Meduna, V (2015), Wellington, New Zealand, Bridget Williams Books
- Science on Ice: Discovering the Secrets of Antarctica, Meduna, V (2013), Auckland, New Zealand, Auckland University Press
- Atoms, Dinosaurs and DNA: 68 Great New Zealand Scientists, Meduna, V, Priestley, R (2008) Auckland, New Zealand, Random House
