= Pānia Papa =

New Zealand Māori language advocate

Pānia Papa ONZM
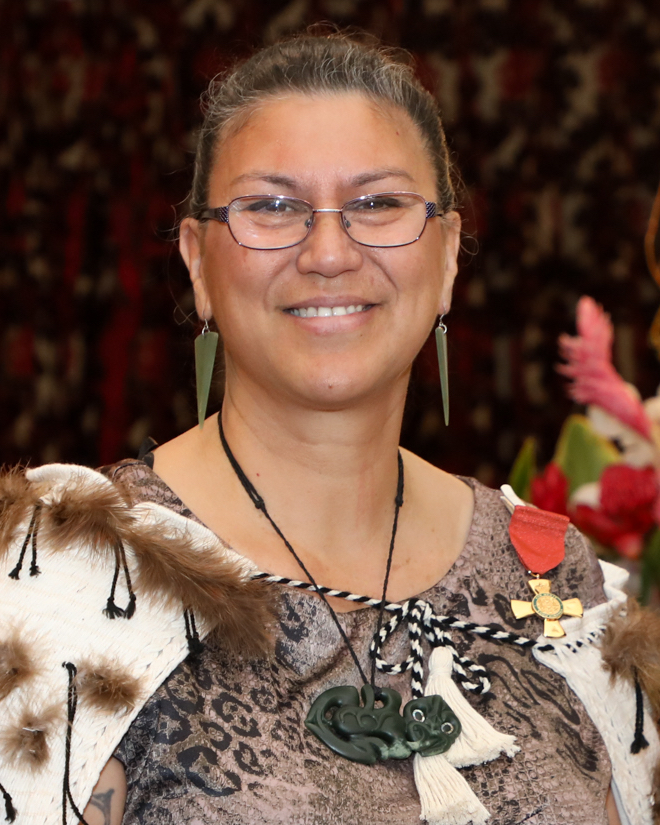
- Papa in 2023

Personal information
- Born: Pānia Christine Papa; 30 May 1970 (age 56) New Zealand
- Occupations: University lecturer; linguist and translator; television presenter
- Height: 1.75 m (5 ft 9 in)

Netball career
- Playing positions: GK, WD, GD
Years	National team	Caps
1990	New Zealand	2

Pānia Christine Papa ONZM CRSNZ (born 30 May 1970) is a former netball player who played on two occasions for the New Zealand national netball team. She is now an advocate for the preservation of te reo Māori, the language of the Māori people, the indigenous population of New Zealand. In this capacity, she has been a frequent presenter on Māori Television, a writer and translator of books, particularly for children, and a university lecturer.

== Early life ==
Papa was born on 30 May 1970. Her father, Tioriori Papa, was Māori and his family came from Taharoa and Kāwhia in the Waikato region of New Zealand's North Island. Her mother, Vivienne, came from the East End of London in England. Papa has three sisters and one brother and they were brought up in Tokoroa in South Waikato, where they went to school.

== Netball career ==
Papa's sisters all played netball. Her sister, Linda, played for the North Harbour team in Auckland and Pānia Papa played for Waikato. In 1990, she became the 93rd woman to be selected for the New Zealand national netball team, the Silver Ferns, playing against Jamaica in New Zealand and in a tri-series event in Australia that also involved the English team. However, having played two test matches in 1990, she was not selected for any further internationals.

== Revitalization of the Māori language ==
Papa has spent much of her life working to promote the use of te reo Māori. She is not a native speaker of the language and only began studying it at Tokoroa Intermediate School. She moved on to Tokoroa High School and then to university, where she began to speak the language more fluently, while obtaining a master's in social sciences. She spent ten years lecturing in Māori studies at the University of Waikato, which has a Faculty of Māori and Indigenous Studies.

Papa has helped produce Māori-language versions of popular cartoons such as SpongeBob SquarePants and Dora the Explorer. In 2010 she started to present on Māori Television a Māori-language series called Ako, which targeted intermediate level speakers. In 2016, she began a new series, called Ōpaki, which used a range of language-learning techniques, games, music and other activities to teach te reo Māori. It was set in a home where students spent a week with Papa, speaking only te reo while carrying out everyday activities.

In 2016 Papa was appointed to the 13-member Board of Te Mātāwai, the organisation in charge of the revitalization of the Māori language. She has been a member of the Waikato Tainui Reo Advisory Group, working to implement the Waikato-Tainui iwi's (tribe's) language strategy. She has also worked to develop the language strategy of the Ngāti Raukawa and the Ngāti Kahungunu iwis'. She is a director of Takatū Associates, which focuses on innovations in Māori language education and broadcasting, and assistant director of Te Panekiretanga o te Reo, the Institute of Excellence in the Māori Language. She was a member of the panel that reviewed New Zealand's Māori Language Strategy in 2011 and was on the group that oversaw the translation of the Māori Language Act 2016, a revision of the Māori Language Act 1987.

In 2019, the broadcaster Miriama Kamo and her husband Michael Dreaver approached Papa with a plan to publish a hundred books in Māori over the next twenty-five years. They named the initiative Kotahi Rau Pukapuka, or one hundred books. Until then, the number of books being published in Māori for the general reader had been less than one a year. The initiative's first four books were translations of Paulo Coelho's The Alchemist, J. K. Rowling's Harry Potter and the Philosopher's Stone, and Dr. Seuss' Oh, the Places You'll Go!, as well as an original non-fiction book on Māori ceremonial dances and songs written by Tīmoti Kāretu, called Mātāmua ko te Kupu! In a separate initiative, Penguin New Zealand published Māori translations of the New Zealand classic Whale Rider by Witi Ihimaera and Diary of a Wimpy Kid by Jeff Kinney. Previously, publication in Māori had not been considered viable because of the low number of potential readers, but there are now clear signs of the number of Māori speakers increasing.

In 2021 it was announced that Papa would be a member of the faculty for a new two-year master's degree course at the indigenous tertiary education provider, Te Wānanga o Aotearoa. There was high demand for the course, which was fully subscribed without any promotion, reflecting the increased interest in te reo.

Papa collaborated with composer Robert Wiremu to create Toiere, a work that combines arias from classical music, waiata and the Māori language. Papa translated the lyrics of arias by Bizet, Rossini, Mozart, Offenbach and Verdi into Māori and Wiremu arranged the music. The waiata included a new one Te Iere Tōiri which was written to honour Dame Kiri te Kanawa. Toiere was performed at the Auckland Arts Festival in 2025.

== Honours and awards ==
In the 2023 New Year Honours, Papa was appointed an Officer of the New Zealand Order of Merit, for services to Māori language education and broadcasting. In July 2026, Papa was elected as a Companion of the Royal Society Te Apārangi, for "a sustained and eminent contribution to the revitalisation of te reo Māori".

She was a finalist in the New Zealand Book Awards for Children and Young Adults for the Wright Family Foundation Te Kura Pounamu Award with authors Miriama Kamo and Rangi Matamua, illustrator Isobel Joy Te Aho-White, and co-translator Leon Blake for their book Matariki ki te Ao in 2025.

== Publications ==
=== Technical publications ===
- Papa, P., & Te Aho, L. (1999). Equal Employment Opportunities for Maori Women in Maori Organisations. Raukawa Trust Board.
- Papa, P. (2000). Designing courses in te reo Maori and other indigenous and community languages. In Bilingualism at the Ends of the Earth Conference. Conference held at Hamilton, New Zealand.
- Papa, P., & Te Aho, L. (Eds.) (2004). He Kete Waiata: A Basket of Songs - A compilation of oral history of Ngati Koroki-Kahukura. Hamilton: University of Waikato.

=== Children's books ===
Papa has translated eight books for children into the Māori language, including several in the Kuwi the Kiwi series, written by Kat Merewether (née Quin). Papa and Merewether are also the authors of Pito Mata, a book of 10 stories in te reo Māori for children up to five. The title can be translated as potential.
