= Kate Parker (artist) =

New Zealand artist, author

Kate Parker is a New Zealand artist, author, theatre director and illustrator.

She was born in 1973. Her father is the ceramic artist Richard Parker.

She received a New Generation Award from the New Zealand Arts Foundation in 2010. In 2016, Parker was chosen as the Auckland Council Regional Parks Artist in Residence.

Her picture book Kōwhai and the Giants won Best First Book Award at the 2021 New Zealand Book Awards for Children and Young Adults. One reviewer wrote of the book "Kōwhai and the Giants is a beautiful story that will kindle a desire to not only spend time in nature but, more importantly, a call to nurture it".
