= Vivien Bishop =

New Zealand artist

- Born: Vivien C. Bishop; 1945 (age 80–81); Christchurch, New Zealand
- Known for: Painting
- Spouse: Gavin Bishop

Vivien C. Bishop (born 1945) is a New Zealand artist. Her works are held in the collections of the Auckland Art Gallery Toi o Tāmaki and Museum of New Zealand Te Papa Tongarewa.

== Background ==
Vivien Bishop was born in 1945 in Christchurch, New Zealand.

== Career ==
Bishop has exhibited with:

- the New Zealand Academy of Fine Arts
- The Group in 1967, 1975, 1976, and 1977.

Works by Bishop are held in the collections of the Auckland Art Gallery Toi o Tāmaki and Museum of New Zealand Te Papa Tongarewa. Notable works include: Serendipity (1968); and Window 2 (1970).
