= Sunday (New Zealand TV programme) =

New Zealand current affairs programme

- Title Card
- Presented by: Miriama Kamo
- Country of origin: New Zealand

Production
- Running time: 60 minutes (Mar 2002–Sep 2012; May 2014– May 2024; 30 minutes (Sep 2012–May 2014)

Original release
- Network: TVNZ 1
- Release: 3 March 2002 – 12 May 2024

Sunday is a New Zealand current affairs programme that broadcast on TVNZ 1 on Sunday nights at 7:30 pm between 2002 and 2024.

== History ==
Sunday first premiered in March 2002. Executive producer Jane Skinner served as the producer for the first programme. Presented by Miriama Kamo with a team of New Zealand reporters, the programme began when TV ONE did not renew its rights to 60 Minutes which had aired previously in this time slot. The hour-long show usually features two reports from the local reporters and one report from an overseas current affairs programme. The programme's tagline is "Join Miriama Kamo and the team as they delve into the subjects that matter to you".

In 2012, the show was reduced to half an hour and moved to a new time slot of 7.00pm due to the New Zealand's Got Talent series. TVNZ also reviewed the future of the show. In May 2014, the show returned to an hour time slot.

In March 2024 it was proposed that Sunday will be ending the following May due to a controversial and widely opposed restructure at TVNZ.

On 9 April 2024 this closure was confirmed with the last programme scheduled to release on 12 May. Sunday aired its final programme on 12 May. The final episode carried tributes from several former guests including Dame Lynda Topp. Several members of the Sunday team including presenter Miriama Kamo also appeared in the final episode to share their memories.

== Reporters ==
- Mark Crysell
- Mava Moayyed
- Conor Whitten
- Tania Page
- Kristin Hall

== Controversy ==
=== Broadcasting standards breaches ===
In November 2020, the Broadcasting Standards Authority (BSA) upheld a complaint against an episode of Sunday that named a consultant obstetrician (identified as HV) in relation to an unresolved Health and Disability Commissioner (HDC) complaint. The broadcast focused on a family’s experience of inadequate maternity care and delays in the HDC process following the death of their newborn baby. The BSA found the programme breached fairness and privacy standards by identifying HV without informing them in advance or offering an opportunity to comment, thereby implying responsibility before any official findings. The BSA concluded there was no sufficient public interest in naming HV and ordered TVNZ to pay $3,450 in legal costs to the complainant. TVNZ later agreed to remove HV’s name from online versions of the programme and related articles.
