= Annika Hinze =

New Zealand computer scientist

- Born: 1970
- Occupation: computer scientist

Academic background
- Education: Freie Universität Berlin, Technische Universität Berlin
- Thesis: A-MediAS : concept and design of an adaptive integrating event notification service (2003)
- Doctoral advisor: Heinz Schweppe

Annike Marie Hinze is a New Zealand computer scientist, and is a full professor at the University of Waikato, specialising in algorithms to detect complex patterns in data. As of 2023, she is the head of the School of Mathematical and Computer Sciences.

== Academic career ==
Hinze studied technical mathematics, electrical engineering and computer sciences at Technische Universität Berlin, gaining a Master of Science degree. She then completed a PhD titled A-MEDIAS: Concept and Design of an Adaptive Integrating Event Notification Service at the Free University of Berlin, under the supervision of Heinz Schweppe. She also has a postgraduate certificate in tertiary teaching from the University of Waikato. Hinze joined the faculty of the University of Waikato in 2003, rising to full professor in 2023. As of 2023, she is head of Mathematical and Computer Sciences.

Hinze's research focuses on "location and event-based system and digital libraries". She is interested in algorithms to detect complex patterns in data, and in digital library systems. She works in cross-disciplinary teams, with partners in research and industry, and from areas including science, geography, education, and Māori and indigenous studies. Hinze co-led, with Judy Bowen and Rangi Mātāmua, a research project to develop a hi-tech vest for forestry workers, aimed at detecting signs of fatigue and thus reducing injury. The vest would contain sensors to monitor vital signs, but the data would be challenging to analyse as it would be continuously streaming, but in a forestry environment, researchers would need to allow for data drop-out and unexpected actions by workers.

== Selected works ==
- Hinze, Annika Marie; Kai Sachs; Alejandro Buchmann (2009), Event-based applications and enabling technologies, Association for Computing Machinery, doi:10.1145/1619258.1619260, Wikidata Q59550114
- Hinze, Annika Marie; Agnès Voisard (2003). "Location- and Time-Based Information Delivery in Tourism". Lecture Notes in Computer Science: 489–507. doi:10.1007/978-3-540-45072-6_28. Wikidata Q59550157.
- Jean F. Power; Carlo R Carere; Charles K Lee; et al. (2018). "Microbial biogeography of 925 geothermal springs in New Zealand". Nature Communications. 9 (1): 2876. Bibcode:2018NatCo...9.2876P. doi:10.1038/s41467-018-05020-y. PMC 6056493. PMID 30038374. Wikidata Q61135773.
- V. Bonstrom; A. Hinze; H. Schweppe, Storing RDF as a graph, Institute of Electrical and Electronics Engineers, doi:10.1109/laweb.2003.1250279, Wikidata Q59550158
- Hinze, Annika Marie; Dana McKay; Nicholas Vanderschantz; Claire Timpany; Cunningham, Sally (2012), Book selection behavior in the physical library, Association for Computing Machinery, doi:10.1145/2232817.2232874, Wikidata Q59550097
- Hinze, Annika Marie (2003). "Efficient Filtering of Composite Events". Lecture Notes in Computer Science: 207–225. doi:10.1007/3-540-45073-4_17. Wikidata Q59550156.
