= Margaret Mahy Award =

New Zealand literary prize

The Margaret Mahy Award, officially the Storylines Margaret Mahy Medal and Lecture Award, is a New Zealand literary prize presented to a person who has made a significant contribution to children's literature, publishing or literacy. Presented annually since 1991 by the Storylines Children's Literature Charitable Trust of New Zealand, the award is named in honour of its first recipient, Margaret Mahy.

The Saturday closest to International Children's Book Day (unless this is during Easter) is called "Margaret Mahy Day" by the trust, during which they present the Margaret Mahy Award, as well as other awards. The recipient delivers a lecture during the ceremony, known as the "Margaret Mahy Lecture", which is subsequently published in the trust's yearbook, The Inside Story.

== Recipients ==
Year	Name	Lecture publication title
1991	Margaret Mahy	Surprising Moments
1992	Dorothy Butler	Telling Tales
1993	Joy Cowley	Influences
1994	Betty Gilderdale	Some Cautionary Tales
1995	Elsie Locke	For Children You Must Do it Better
1996	Tessa Duder	Learning to Swim in the Deep
1997	Ann Mallinson	From a Trickle to a River
1998	William Taylor	A Strange Way for an Adult Male to be Making a Living!
1999	Lynley Dodd	Writing the Pictures and Painting the Words
2000	Gavin Bishop	Kia Ora Professor Cole
2001	Sherryl Jordan	Journeys of the Heart
2002	Maurice Gee	Creeks and Kitchens
2003	Jack Lasenby	Changes and Origins
2004	Pamela Allen	My Picture Books
2005	David Hill	By the Book
2006	Robyn Belton	Gathering Images: The Stories Behind the Pictures
2007	Ken Catran	Teen Literature: Demons Old and New
2008	Wayne Mills	Reading Aloud is Allowed
2009	Andrew Crowe	Creative Non-Fiction
2010	Barbara Larson	Grazing the Longacre
2011	Kate De Goldi	Legends of the Swamp
2012	Fleur Beale	Where Do Ideas Come From?
2013	Bill Nagelkerke	The Sorcerer's Apprentice
2014	David Elliot	When the Bowsprit Get Mixed with the Rudder
2015	Jill Eggleton	Everyone Has A Story
2016	Barbara Else	Making it up as I go along, or Finding the Cornerstones of Creativity
2017	Des Hunt	Stories Out Loud
2018	Janice Marriott	
2019	Mandy Hager	
2020	Maria Gill	
2021	Julia Marshall	
2022	Diana Noonan	
2023	James Norcliffe	
2024	Elizabeth Jones	
2025	Paula Green	Kites and Anchors: a collage of writing poetry for and with children
2026	Tim Tipene	Choosing to Fly
