= The Wonky Donkey =

2009 children's book by Craig Smith

- Author: Craig Smith
- Illustrator: Katz Cowley
- Cover artist: Cowley
- Language: English
- Genre: children's books picture books
- Published: 2009, Scholastic New Zealand Ltd
- Publication place: New Zealand
- Media type: print
- Pages: 24
- Awards: Children's Choice
- ISBN: 9781869439262
- Followed by: The Grinny Granny Donkey

The Wonky Donkey is a 2009 children's book by New Zealander Craig Smith. It is illustrated by British-born Katz Cowley, who has a degree in Illustration from the University of Northumbria.

The book is based on a song that Smith wrote in 2005 after hearing the joke: "What do you call a donkey with three legs? – A wonky donkey". In 2018, the book was featured in a viral video of a Scottish grandmother laughing hysterically as she attempted to read it to her infant grandson, leading to a surge in purchases of the book worldwide.

== Plot ==
The book is a cumulative tale in which an additional characteristic of the titular donkey is added on each pair of pages: as a description on one page and an adjective (single or reduplicative) on the facing page. The first two characteristics are having three legs and having one eye, hence "a winky wonky donkey". The adjectives all end in -nky, concatenating into an amusing tongue-twister. The accompanying illustrations progressively add details to match the text.

== Awards ==
- Children's Choice Award by the New Zealand Post Children's Book Awards
- The song was the APRA New Zealand Children's Song of the Year Award in 2008.

== Controversy ==
In 2010 a schoolteacher alleged that Smith had heavily based the book on several internet jokes and had not referenced this in his work. Smith and his publisher responded by stating that the song predated the specific versions that the educator had seen on the internet and that it was possible that these versions had emerged because of his success with the song and resulting book.
