= Bob Kerr (author and artist) =

New Zealand artist and illustrator

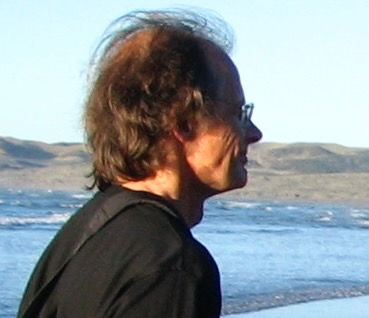
Bob Kerr in 2004

Bob Kerr (born 1951) is an author, illustrator and artist based in Wellington, New Zealand. He writes and illustrates children’s books and has won several awards for his work. He lives and works in Wellington, New Zealand.

== Biography ==
Bob Kerr was born in 1951 in Wellington, New Zealand. He grew up in Tokoroa, where his first job was delivering The South Waikato News, and graduated with a Diploma of Fine Arts (Hons) in 1974 from the University of Auckland. He later worked as a union organiser, including for the Musicians Union and Actors Equity, and as a freelance illustrator.

In 1973 he was an editor of Craccum (the Auckland University Students' Association weekly magazine) along with collaborator Stephen Ballantyne, with whom he went on to create Terry and the Gunrunners, which has been adapted for television twice. The first series was released in 1985 and is hosted in full on NZ On Screen. The 2016 series was "a darker, edgier, more mature reboot of the show". The comic was re-issued in 2015.

He was a judge of the New Zealand Post Children's Book Awards in 2005 and 2012; in 2005 he was the convener of the panel.

Many of his stories have appeared in the New Zealand School Journal. He was included in the book A Nest of Singing Birds: 100 Years of the New Zealand School Journal where, in an interview with Gregory O’Brien, he talks about his illustrating work for the School Journal during the 1990s, the creative freedom it allowed, the importance of the School Journal in allowing generations of illustrators the opportunity to learn their craft and his wish for his landscapes, townscapes and people to be recognisably “from here”.

== Painting ==
Kerr's paintings are often based on historical events. His work has featured the stories of conscientious objectors, scientists, the New Zealand Wars, Rua Kenana, the 1916 police invasion of Maungapohatu, a New Zealand soldier's experiences during the Gallipoli campaign, and the Waihi miners' strike of 1912. His best-known work appears on the original cover of Michael King's book The Penguin History of New Zealand (2003). Other articles reveal his travels through his sketchbooks.

His work has been shown in several galleries, including Whitespace, Suite, Enjoy, McAtamney and Milford galleries. His political poster 'Before and After State Sector Carve Up' is held at Te Papa Tongarewa. His work The Great South Road was acquired by Waikato Museum Te Whare Taonga o Waikato.

In 2019, Toby Morris visited Bob Kerr in his Wellington studio for The Spinoff webseries Two Sketches to talk about his work and career.

== Select bibliography ==
- Lucy’s Big Plan, text by Christine Harris (Collins, 1977)
- Lucy Loops the Loop, text by Oz Kraus (Collins, 1979)
- Terry and the Gunrunners, text by Stephen Ballantyne (Collins,1982)
- Terry and the Yodelling Bull, text by Stephen Ballantyne (Finlayson Hill, 1986)
- Terry and the Last Moa, text by Stephen Ballantyne (Hodder & Stoughton, 1990)
- For a Living, co-edited with Linda Mitchell (Working Life Publications, 1991)
- The Optimist (Mallinson Rendel 1992)
- The Day of the Rain, text by Joy Cowley (Mallinson Rendel, 1993)
- The Day of the Snow, text by Joy Cowley (Mallinson Rendel, 1994)
- The Paper War (Mallinson Rendel, 1994)
- Mechanical Harry (Mallinson Rendel, 1996)
- Strange Tales from the Mall (Mallinson Rendel,1998)
- Mechanical Harry and the Flying Bicycle (Mallinson Rendel, 1999)
- After the War (Mallinson Rendel, 2000)
- Field punishment No.1., text by David Grant with paintings by Bob Kerr (Steele Roberts, 2008)
- Waiheathens. Voices from a Mining Town, text by Mark Derby with paintings by Bob Kerr (Atuanui Press, 2013)
- Best Mates, text by Philippa Werry (New Holland Publishers, 2014)
- Changing Times, The Story of a New Zealand Town and its Newspaper (Potton and Burton, 2015)
- Terry Teo and the Gunrunners by Bob Kerr and Stephen Ballantyne (New edition; Earths End Publishing, 2015)
- The Empire City: Songs of Wellington, text by Andrew Laking (Pirate & Queen in association with Victoria University Press, 2015)
- Jack & Sandy (Bateman Books, 2023)
- The Takoradi Run (Bateman Books, 2026)

== Awards and prizes ==
- 1993 AIM Children’s Book Awards Best First Book for The Optimist.
- 1993 AIM Children’s Book Awards Junior Fiction Shortlist for The Optimist.
- 1994 AIM Children’s Book Awards Picture Book Shortlist for The Day of the Rain.
- 1997 New Zealand Post Children’s Book Awards Children’s Choice Winner for Mechanical Harry.
- 1997 New Zealand Post Children’s Book Awards Picture Book Shortlist for Mechanical Harry.
- 1999 New Zealand Post Children’s Book Awards Junior Fiction Shortlist for Strange Tales from the Mall.
- 2000 Storylines Notable Book Awards Picture Books List for Mechanical Harry and the Flying Bicycle.
- 2001 Russell Clark Award Winner for After the War.
- 2001 Esther Glen Award Shortlist for After the War.
- 2001 New Zealand Post Children’s Book Awards Picture Book Shortlist for After the War.
- 2001 PANZ Book Design Awards Best Use of Illustration Winner for After the War.
- 2001 Storylines Notable Book Awards Picture Books List for After the War.
- 2016 Storylines Notable Book Award (Picture Book) for Changing Times: The Story of a New Zealand Town and its Newspaper.
- 2016 New Zealand Book Awards for Children and Young Adults finalist for the Elsie Locke Non-Fiction Award for Changing Times.
- 2016 New Zealand Book Awards for Children and Young Adults finalist for the Russell Clark Award for Illustration for Changing Times.
