= Gavin Bishop =

New Zealand children's book writer and illustrator

Gavin Bishop ONZM
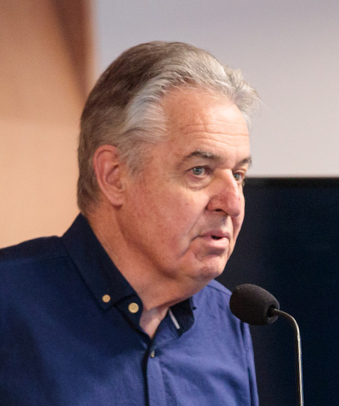
- Bishop in 2018
- Born: Gavin John Bishop; 1946 (age 79–80); Invercargill, New Zealand
- Education: University of Canterbury
- Occupation: Writer
- Spouse: Vivien Bishop
- Children: 3
- Writing career
- Language: English
- Website: gavinbishop.com

Gavin John Bishop ONZM (born 1946) is an author and illustrator, from Invercargill, New Zealand. He is known for illustrating books from prominent New Zealand authors, including Joy Cowley and Margaret Mahy.

== Early life ==
Bishop was born on 13 February 1946 in Invercargill, to a Tainui and Ngāti Awa family.

== Career ==
Bishop worked as a high school art teacher for thirty years, before writing and illustrating children's books full-time.

Bishop's first published picture book was Mrs McGinty and the Bizarre Plant, published in 1981 by Oxford University Press.

The book Bidi Bidi was turned into a TV series, for which he wrote the screenplay and lyrics.

In 2006, he accused the makers of the Hollywood film Mr and Mrs Smith of plagiarizing his 1997 school book The Secret Lives of Mr and Mrs Smith.

Hundreds of artworks by Bishop were purchased by the Museum of New Zealand Te Papa Tongarewa in a deal announced in 2025.

== Select honours and awards ==
- 2026 - Finalist for Elsie Locke Award for non-fiction for Taniwha at the 2026 New Zealand Book Awards for Children and Young Adults.
- 2022 – Margaret Mahy Book of the Year, the Nonfiction and Illustration awards for Atua
- 2018 – Margaret Mahy Book of the Year Award for Aotearoa: The New Zealand Story at the New Zealand Children's Book Awards
- 2013 – Officer of the New Zealand Order of Merit, for services to Children's Literature.
- 2013 – Mallinson Rendel Illustrators Award
- 2013, 2000, 1994, 1983 – New Zealand Post Children's Book Awards, winner of the picture book category.
- 2010, 2008, 2006, 1982 – LIANZA Russell Clark Medal for Illustration.
- 2000 – Margaret Mahy Medal for Services to Children's Literature.
- 1984 – Noma Concours for Picture Book Illustrations, Grand Prize.

== Select bibliography ==
- 2025 - Taniwha, 64pp (Penguin) ISBN 9781776957446
- 2024 – Titiro Look, 36pp (Gecko Press) ISBN 9781776575459
- 2021 – Atua: Māori gods and heroes, 64pp (Picture Puffin) ISBN 9780143775690
- 2020 – Mihi, 18pp, (Gecko Press) ISBN 9781776573028
- 2018 – Cook's Cook Limited Edition, 40pp, (Gecko Press) ISBN 978-1-776572-04-5
- 2018 – Cook's Cook, 40pp, (Gecko Press) ISBN 978-1-776572-04-5
- 2017 – Aotearoa: The New Zealand Story (Penguin)
- 2017 – Helper and Helper, 128pp, (Gecko Press) ISBN 978-1-776571-05-5
- 2013 – Mister Whistler, 32pp, (Gecko Press) ISBN 9781877467929
- 2012 – Koinei te Whare nā Haki i Hanga, 40pp, Māori translation of The House that Jack Built (Gecko Press) ISBN 9781877467790
- 2012 – The House that Jack Built, 40pp, (Gecko Press) ISBN 9781877467615
- 2010 – Counting the Stars: Four Maori Myths
- 2010 – Friends: Snake & Lizard, Joy Cowley, Gecko Press (illustrator)
- 2010 – Cowshed Christmas (illustrator)
- 2010 – There Was a Crooked Man
- 2009 – Piano Rock: A 1950s Childhood
- 2008 – Rats!
- 2008 – Snake & Lizard, Gecko Press (illustrator)
- 2007 – Riding the Waves: four Maori Myths
- 2006 – Te Waka
- 2006 – Kiwi Moon
- 2005 – Taming the Sun: Four Maori Myths
- 2004 – The Three Billy Goats Gruff
- 2002 – Tom Thumb
- 1982 – Mr. Fox, 32pp, (Oxford University Press) ISBN 0195580893

== See also ==
- New Zealand literature
