= Joy Cowley Award =

The Joy Cowley Award was established by Storylines Children's Literature Foundation of New Zealand in 2002 to honour the outstanding contribution to children's literature by Joy Cowley.

The Award is for a picture book manuscript, of no more than 1000 words, for children 0–7 or 7–13 years and is awarded annually, when merited. It consists of an award of NZ$1500 with an offer of publication by Scholastic New Zealand.

Entries close 31 October each year. The award is announced each year in March and the book published the following year. The entrants must be residents of New Zealand.

| Year | Author | Book | Refs |
| 2003 | Julie Leibrich | The Biggest Number in the Universe |
| 2004 | Jean Prior | The Waka |
| 2005 | Kyle Mewburn | Kiss! Kiss! Yuck! Yuck! |
| 2006 | Moira Wairama | The Puppet Box |
| 2007 | no award |
| 2008 | Michelle Osment | Tiny Miss Dott and Her Dotty Umbrella |
| 2009 | June Peka | Magpie Mischief |
| 2010 | Lucy Davey | Out of Bed, Fred! |
| 2011 | Sarah Johnson | Wooden Arms |
| 2012 | Isaac Drought | Alphabet Squabble |
| 2013 | Aimee McNaughton | I Can't Imagine How it Happened |
| 2014 | Emma Vere-Jones | Stan the Van Man |
| 2015 | Joy H Davidson | Witch's Cat Wanted, Apply Within |
| 2016 | Sarah Grundy | The Curious Ar-chew |
| 2017 | no award |
| 2018 | Elaine Bickell | The Little Ghost Who Lost Her Boo |
| 2019 | Janelle Wilkey | Omeletta Hen |
| 2020 | Tania Sickling | Grandpa Versus Swing |
| 2021 | Kirsty Wadsworth | "Ihaka, the Unexpected Visitor" |
| 2022 | Melanie Koster | "Tama and the Taniwha" |
| 2023 | Kristin Kelly | "The Squeaking" |
