= Mat Tait =

New Zealand author, illustrator, artist and cartoonist

- Born: 1970 (age 55–56); Christchurch, New Zealand
- Writing career
- Language: English
- Genres: Cartoons, illustration
- Website: mattait.com

Mat Tait (born 1970) is a New Zealand author, illustrator, artist and cartoonist. His book Te Wehenga: The Separation of Ranginui and Papatūānuku won the Margaret Mahy Book of the Year at the 2023 New Zealand Book Awards for Children and Young Adults.

Tait was a judge for the New Zealand Book Awards for Children and Young Adults in 2025. Tait's 2026 book Kupe and the Great Octopus of Muturangi was nominated for the Russell Clark Award for Illustration and the original te reo Māori version Kupe me te Wheke nui a Muturangi was nominated for the Wright Family Foundation Te Kura Pounamu Award in the 2026 New Zealand Book Awards for Children and Young Adults.

== Publications ==
=== As writer and illustrator ===
- Te Wehenga: The Separation of Ranginui and Papatūānuku (Allen & Unwin, 2022)
- Kupe and the Great Octopus of Muturangi (Allen & Unwin, 2026)

=== As illustrator ===
- The Adventures of Tupaia by Courtney Sina Meredith (Allen & Unwin, 2019)
- The Heading Dog who Split in Half: Legends and Tall Tales from New Zealand by Michael Brown (Potton & Burton, 2015)
