= Maria Gill =

New Zealand children's writer

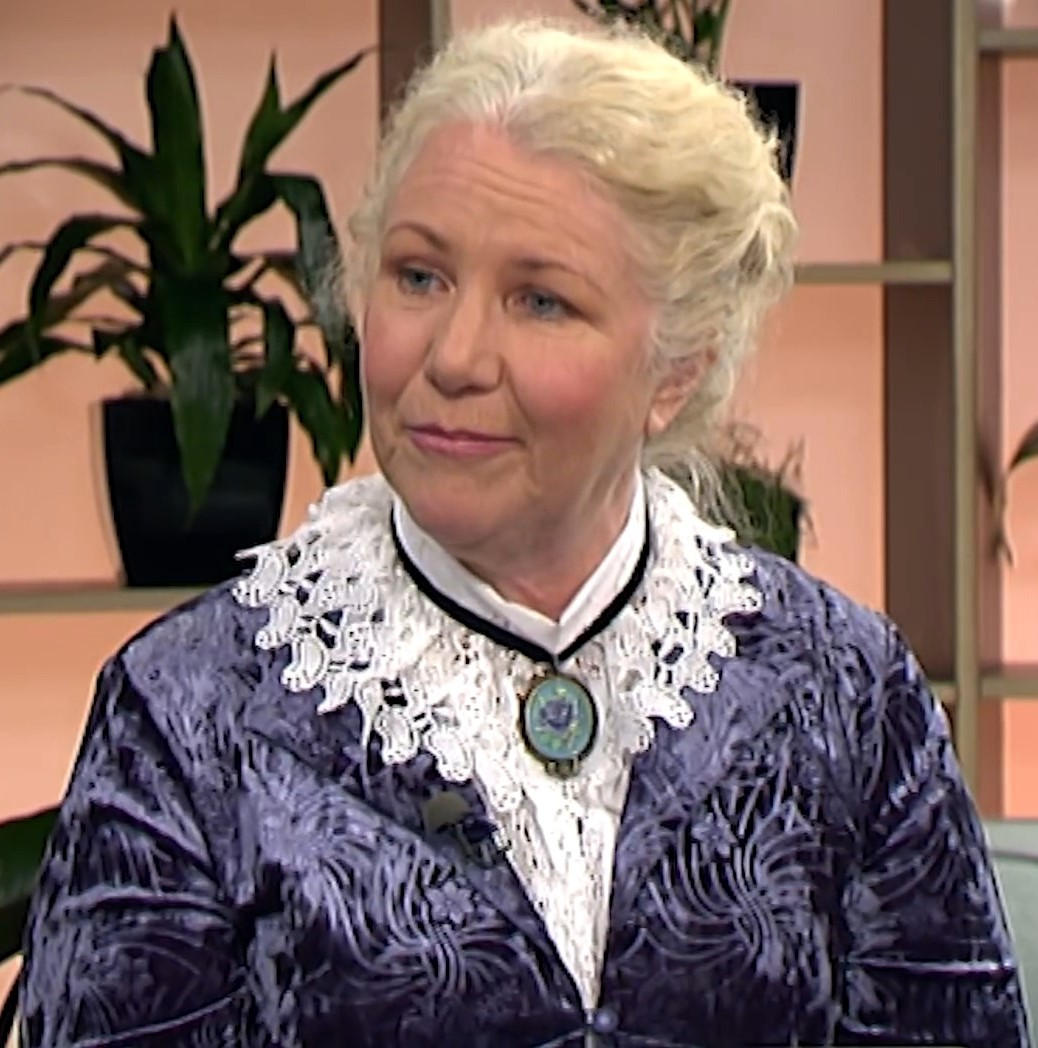
- Gill in 2018
- Born: October 1961 (age 64); Auckland, New Zealand
- Occupation: Writer
- Website: mariagill.co.nz

Maria Gill is a writer of children's non-fiction books, educational resources and freelance articles. A number of her books have been shortlisted for or have won awards, including Anzac Heroes which won the Non-fiction Award and the Supreme Book of the Year prize in the New Zealand Book Awards for Children and Young Adults in 2016. She lives in Auckland, New Zealand.

== Biography ==
Maria Gill was born in October 1961 in Auckland, New Zealand. She was educated at schools in Auckland and Southport, Gold Coast, and also studied by correspondence while her family was living in a caravan and travelling around Australia. After leaving school and doing office work for a few years, Maria worked in a variety of jobs, including barmaid, nanny, shepherdess and grape picker, while she travelled overseas, visiting countries such as England, India, Nepal and China. She returned to New Zealand and studied at the University of Auckland and Auckland College of Education, graduating with a Bachelor of Education degree and Teaching Diploma. She taught for about ten years in primary and intermediate schools. Later she also gained a Graduate Diploma of Journalism Studies from Massey University. In 2021 Gill completed a master's degree at Auckland University of Technology.

Maria had wanted to write from childhood and first began to do so seriously when her children were small. She has a special interest in themes to do with native wildlife, conservation and the environment, people, history and war. She has also written many books and resources for the educational market.

In 2013-2014, Maria lectured and tutored a Writing for Children paper for Massey University. She co-wrote the Coursera online course Writing for Young Readers: Opening the Treasure Chest for the Commonwealth Education Trust. She also organised two touring exhibitions of displays about war-related children's books: What Lies Beneath, which travelled around New Zealand, and Anzac Stories: Behind the Pages, which featured in libraries in Brisbane, Newcastle, Canberra, Hobart and other parts of Australia.

Maria visits schools as part of the Writers in Schools programme and is a popular speaker at literary festivals. She appeared at the SCBWI conference, Sydney, 2012 and 2016 and the Auckland Writers Festival in 2018. She gives author talks and workshops for several Speakers’ Agencies in New Zealand and Australia.

== Awards and prizes ==
Many of her books have been selected as Storylines Notable Books and shortlisted for awards such as the LIANZA Elsie Locke Non-Fiction Award and the New Zealand Post Children's Book Awards.

New Zealand Hall of Fame won the Children's Choice Award in the non-fiction category of the 2012 New Zealand Post Children's Book Awards, and Anzac Heroes won the Elsie Locke Award for Non-Fiction and the Supreme Book of the Year prize in the 2016 New Zealand Book Awards for Children and Young Adults. In 2020 she was awarded the Margaret Mahy Medal in recognition of her lifetime contribution to children's literature.

== Bibliography ==
- A Flame in the Dark (OneTree House, 2026)
- Queen of the Cosmos: Beatrice Hill Tinsley ill. Alistair Hughes (Upstart Press, 2024)
- The King's Medal ill. Alistair Hughes (Upstart Press, 2021)
- Remarkable Animal Stories from New Zealand and Australia ill. Emma Huia Lovegrove (Scholastic, 2021)
- New Zealand Disasters: Our response, resilience and recovery ill. Marco Ivancic (Scholastic, 2021)
- Ice Breaker! ill. Alistair Hughes (Upstart Press, 2020)
- On the Brink (New Holland, 2019)
- Kate Sheppard: Leading the way for Women (Scholastic, 2018)
- Earthquakes! Shaking New Zealand (New Holland, 2018)
- Anzac Animals (Scholastic, 2018)
- Toroa’s Journey (Potton & Burton, 2017)
- Abel Tasman: Mapping the Southern Lands (Scholastic, 2017)
- Volcanoes: DK Find Out! (Dorling & Kindersley, 2016)
- Anzac Heroes ill. Marco Ivancic (Scholastic, 2016)
- New Zealand Sports Hall of Fame ill. Marco Ivancic (New Holland, 2014)
- Operation Nest Egg Chick ill. Bruce Potter (Long White Cloud Books, 2014; Pixel Books, 2013)
- The Last of Maui’s Dolphins ill. Bruce Potter (New Holland, 2014)
- Running Our Country: A look inside New Zealand’s Government ill. Malcolm Evans (New Holland, 2013, reprinted 2018)
- Eruption! Discovering New Zealand Volcanoes (New Holland, 2012)
- The Call of the Kokako ill. Heather Arnold (New Holland, 2011)
- New Zealand’s Hall of Fame: 50 Remarkable Kiwis ill. Bruce Potter (New Holland, 2011)
- Rangitoto ill. Heather Arnold (Penguin, 2009; Long White Cloud Books, 2014; Pixel Books, 2013)
- Save Our Seas ill. Vivienne Lingard (New Holland, 2009)
- Eco-agents mission: Save our Planet (New Holland, 2009)
- Dogs on the Job (Reed, 2008)
- Operation Nest Egg (Reed, 2007)
- Bird’s-eye View (Penguin Books, 2006)
