= Courtney Sina Meredith =

New Zealand poet, playwright, author, for-purpose sector leader

- Born: 1986 (age 39–40)
- Education: University of Auckland
- Writing career
- Genres: Plays, poetry, short stories
- Notable awards: University of Auckland Young Alumna of the Year 2021, Iowa University Honorary Fellow in Writing 2016
- Website: Official website

Courtney Sina Meredith (born 1986) is a New Zealand poet, playwright, short story author, and for-purpose leader. She has held executive director roles at organisations such as Tautai Pacific Arts Trust, RainbowYOUTH, and the Publishers Association of New Zealand.

== Background ==
Born in 1986, Meredith grew up in Glen Innes and is of Samoan, Cook Island and Irish descent. She attended Ponsonby Primary School, Ponsonby Intermediate School, and Western Springs College, her mother Kim Meredith is also a poet. Meredith studied English and Political Studies at the University of Auckland.

== Career ==
Meredith's writing is often political, dealing with issues such as poverty, conflict, sexism and racism, and draws on her roots in the Samoan diaspora of Auckland.

Meredith's play Rushing Dolls, was published in 2012 in the collection Urbanesia: Four Pasifika Plays. She has also published Brown Girls in Bright Red Lipstick, a book of poetry, and Tail of the Taniwha, a collection of short stories and poetry. Her work has been translated into Italian, German, Dutch, French, Spanish and Bahasa Indonesia.

Work by Meredith has also been published in literary journals including Poetry New Zealand, What's Poetry? and Ika.

Meredith has spoken at a number of book festivals including the Frankfurt Book Fair, the Mexico City Poetry Festival, and Edinburgh International Book Festival.

Her children and young persons book The Adventures of Tupaia co-authored with Mat Tait came out in 2019 and is about Tupaia, a navigator from Tahiti, who sailed to New Zealand with Captain Cook on board the Endeavour. In 2021 the poetry book by Meredith Burst Kisses on the Actual Wind was published by Beatnik Publishing.

She was the director of the Tautai Pacific Arts Trust in 2022, which is a leading Pacific arts organisation based on Karangahape Road in Auckland. She has also lectured, been a contributing editor for Paperboy, worked at the Auckland Council in Arts and Culture and Festival and Community Events teams, and partnerships manager at Manukau Institute of Technology.

== Awards ==
Meredith received a grant from Creative New Zealand to develop her collection of short stories, Tail of the Taniwha.

In 2011, Meredith became the first writer of Pasifika descent and first New Zealander to hold the LiteraturRaum Blebitreu Berlin residency. In 2016 she was invited to participant in the International Writing Program at the University of Iowa. Following this residency, she was writer in residence at the Island Institute in Sitka, Alaska. She has also held a residency at the Sylt Foundation.

In 2010, her play Rushing Dolls was the runner up for the Adam NZ Play Award and won Best Play by a Woman Playwright. The same year it won the Aotearoa Pasifika Play Competition.

In the 2013 PANZ Book Design Awards, Brown Girls in Bright Red Lipstick received a Highly Commended in the category of Hachette New Zealand Award for Best Non-Illustrated Book.

Tail of the Taniwha was longlisted for the 2017 Ockham New Zealand Book Awards for the Acorn Foundation Fiction Prize.

In 2021 she was awarded the University of Auckland’s Young Alumna of the Year
