= Joy Cowley =

New Zealand writer (born 1936)

Joy Cowley ONZ DCNZM OBE
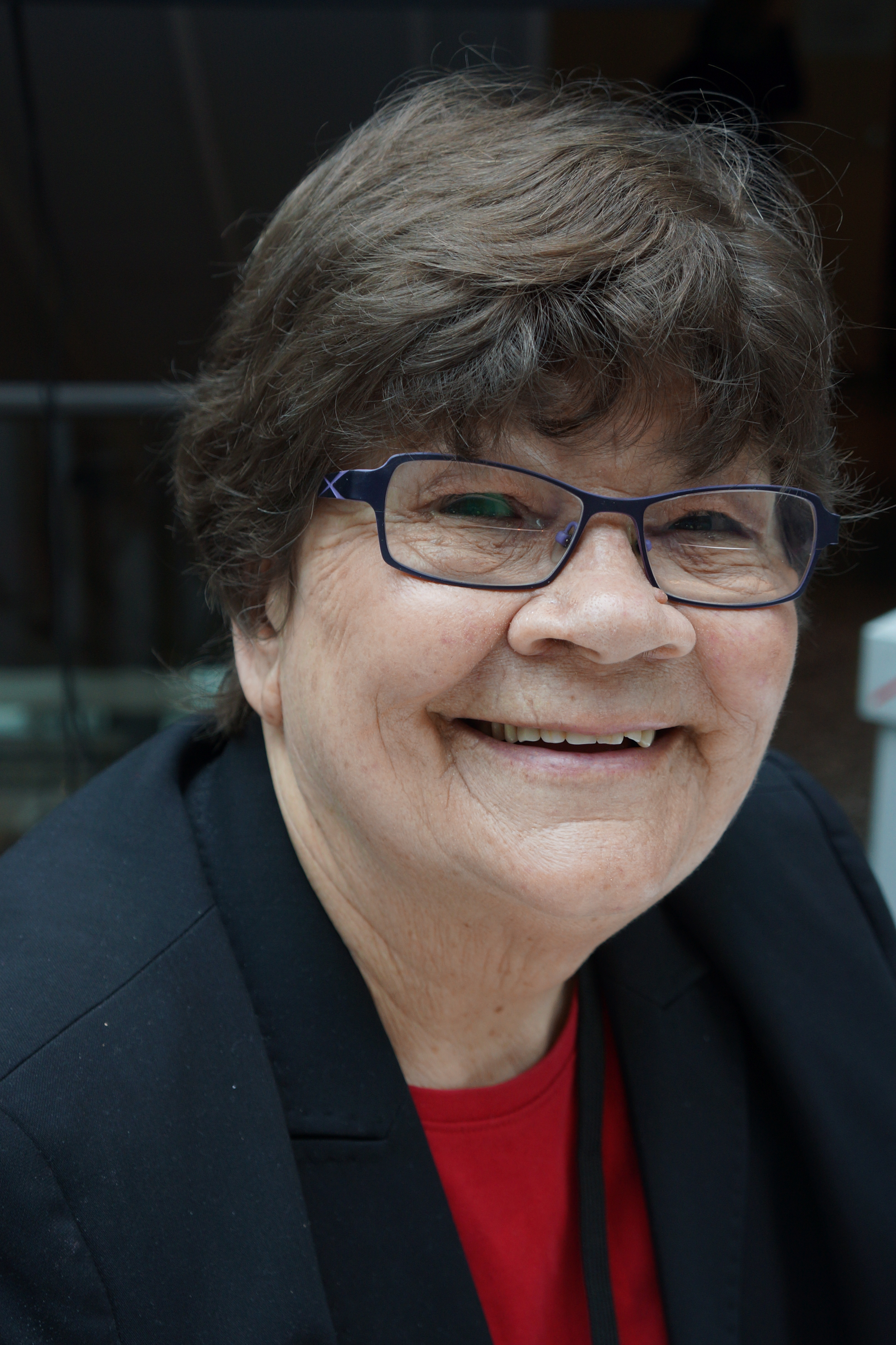
- At the 2012 Frankfurt Book Fair
- Born: Cassia Joy Summers; 7 August 1936 (age 90); Levin, New Zealand
- Occupation: Writer
- Spouses: Ted Cowley (c. 1956–1967); Malcolm Mason (m. 1970; died 1985) Terry Coles (m. 1989; died 2022)
- Writing career
- Pen name: Joy Cowley
- Language: English
- Period: 1967–present
- Notable awards: Honorary DLitt (Massey University)
- Website: joycowley.com

Cassia Joy Cowley ONZ DCNZM OBE (née Summers; born 7 August 1936) is a New Zealand author best known for her children's fiction, including the popular series of books Mrs. Wishy-Washy.

== Writing career ==
Cowley started out writing novels for adults, and her first book, Nest in a Falling Tree (1967), was adapted for the screen by Roald Dahl. It became the 1971 film The Night Digger. Following its success in the United States, Cowley wrote several other novels, including Man of Straw (1972), Of Men and Angels (1972), The Mandrake Root (1975), and The Growing Season (1979). Typical themes of these works were marital infidelity, mental illness, and death, as experienced within families. Cowley has also published several collections of short stories, including Two of a Kind (with Mona Williams, 1984) and Heart Attack and Other Stories (1985). Today she is best known for children's books, such as The Silent One (1981), which was made into a 1985 film. Others include Bow Down Shadrach (1991) and its sequel, Gladly, Here I Come (1994).

Cowley has written forty-one picture books, such as The Duck in the Gun (1969), The Terrible Taniwha of Timberditch (1982), Salmagundi (1985), and The Cheese Trap (1995). The Duck in the Gun and Salmagundi are explicitly anti-war books. She has been actively involved in teaching early reading skills and helping those with reading difficulties, in which capacity she has written approximately 500 basal readers (termed reading books in New Zealand).

== Honours and awards ==
In 1990, Cowley was awarded the New Zealand 1990 Commemoration Medal, and in the 1992 New Year Honours she was appointed an Officer of the Order of the British Empire, for services to children's literature. The following year she was granted an Honorary Doctorate of Letters (D.Litt.) from Massey University, and was awarded the New Zealand Suffrage Centennial Medal.

In 1993, Cowley became the third recipient of the Margaret Mahy Award, whose winners present and publish a lecture concerning children's literature or literacy. Cowley's lecture was titled Influences . The award is presented by the Storylines Childrens Literature Charitable Trust, who established the Joy Cowley Award in 2002, in recognition of the "exceptional contribution Joy Cowley makes to both children's literature and literacy in New Zealand and internationally". In 2004, she became a patron of the Storylines Childrens Literature Foundation, and she is one of Storylines' trustees. At least one of her books has been on the Storylines Notable Books List every year since it was established in 2000, other than 2009 and 2011 (in 2012 she was given a "special mention").

In 2002, she was awarded the Roberta Long Medal, presented by the University of Alabama at Birmingham for culturally diverse children's literature. In 2004, she was awarded the A. W. Reed Award for Contribution to New Zealand Literature, and in 2010, she won the Prime Minister's Award for Literary Achievement in the Fiction category.

Cowley has won the overall Book of the Year award three times at the various incarnations of the New Zealand Post Children's Book Awards: first for The Silent One in 1982; then for Hunter in 2006; and finally for Snake and Lizard in 2008. The latter two books were entered into the Junior Fiction category, in which she also won the category award for her books Ticket to the Sky Dance in 1998, Starbright and the Dream Eater in 1999, and Shadrach Girl in 2001. She won the Children's Choice award in this category for Friends: Snake and Lizard in 2010.

She won the now defunct Fiction category in 1992 for Bow Down Shadrach, and the Picture Book category in 2002 for Brodie. An additional five of her books have been short-listed as finalists in the Picture Book category at the awards, and an additional three in the Junior Fiction category.

Cowley's book The Video Shop Sparrow was included in the 2000 White Ravens List, administered by the International Youth Library, and five of her books have been finalists for the Esther Glen Award from 1995 to 2010. She won Best Script Television Drama at the 1994 TV Guide Television Awards for Mother Tongue, a 52-minute film shot in 1992, and set in 1953, about an 18-year-old couple who fall in love – although the woman (played by Sarah Smuts-Kennedy) is Catholic, and the man (played by Craig Parker) is Jewish.

In the 2005 Queen’s Birthday Honours, Cowley was appointed a Distinguished Companion of the New Zealand Order of Merit (DCNZM), for services to children's literature. In 2009, when the New Zealand government restored titular honours, Cowley declined redesignation as a dame.

Cowley was made a Member of the Order of New Zealand (ONZ), for services to New Zealand, in the 2018 New Year Honours. In 2020, she received an Arts Foundation of New Zealand Icon Award, limited to 20 living people.

== Personal life ==
Cowley has been married three times, first at twenty years old to dairy farmer Ted Cowley, with whom she had four children. After their marriage ended in 1967, Cowley married Malcolm Mason, a Wellington writer and accountant who died in 1985.

In 1989, Cowley married Terry Coles, a former Catholic priest. She lived with him, and an assortment of animals, for many years in the Marlborough Sounds, but in 2004 they moved to a wharf apartment in Wellington so Coles could be nearer medical services. As Coles' health deteriorated, Wellington's stairs and traffic became too much for him, and the couple moved again to Featherston. She has 13 grandchildren and still writes full-time. Coles died in September 2022.

== Recent publications ==
- 1986 – Turnips For Dinner, illustrated by Jan van der Voo, 16pp., ISBN 0-87449-368-4
- 1986 – The King's Pudding, illustrated by Martin Bailey, 16pp., ISBN 0-87449-370-6
- 2007 – Snake and Lizard, illustrated by Gavin Bishop, 102pp.,(Gecko Press), ISBN 978-0-9582787-3-7
- 2009 – Friends: Snake and Lizard, illustrated by Gavin Bishop, 144pp.,(Gecko Press), ISBN 978-1-877467-25-7
- 2010 – The Fierce Little Woman and the Wicked Pirate, 40pp.,(Gecko Press), ISBN 9781877467400
- 2011 – Stories of the Wild West Gang, 362pp.,(Gecko Press), ISBN 978-1-877467-85-1
- 2013 – Dunger, 156pp.,(Gecko Press), ISBN 978-1-877579-46-2
- 2014 – Speed of Light, 208pp.,(Gecko Press), ISBN 978-1-877579-93-6
- 2015 – The Bakehouse, 140pp.,(Gecko Press), ISBN 978-1-776570-07-2
- 2016 – The Road to Ratenburg, 200pp.,(Gecko Press) ISBN 978-1-776570-75-1
- 2017 – Helper and Helper, 128pp.,(Gecko Press) ISBN 978-1-776571-05-5
- 2018 - Snake and Lizard Anniversary Edition, illustrated by Gavin Bishop, 102pp.,(Gecko Press) ISBN 978-1-877467-25-7

== See also ==
- New Zealand literature
