= Isobel Joy Te Aho-White =

New Zealand illustrator and author

Isobel Joy Te Aho-White (born 1988) is a New Zealand illustrator, artist and author.

She is of Ngāi Tahu and Ngāti Kahungungu ki te Wairoa. She illustrated Whiti: Colossal Squid of the Deep by Victoria Cleal, which won Best Children’s Book at the 2021 Whitley Awards for zoological literature.

In 2025, three books illustrated by Te Aho-White were shortlisted for awards at the New Zealand Book Awards for Children and Young Adults: Ten Nosey Weka, written by Kate Preece, for the BookHub Picture Book Award; A Ariā me te Atua o te Kūmara, written by Witi Ihimaera and translated by Hēni Jacob, for the Wright Family Foundation Te Kura Pounamu Award for Te Reo Māori; and Ngā Kupenga a Nanny Rina, written by Qiane Matata-Sipu, also for the Te Kura Pounamu Award.

Te Aho-White's book Whenua: Māori Pūrākau of Aotearoa won the Elsie Locke Award for Non-Fiction at the 2026 NZ Book Awards for Children and Young Adults.
