= Storylines Notable Book Awards =

Annual New Zealand literature awards

The Storylines Notable Book Awards constitute an annual list of exceptional and outstanding books for children and young people published in New Zealand, by New Zealand authors and illustrators, during the previous calendar year.

== History ==
The Storylines Notable Book Awards began in 1999 and have been announced each year since then.

The list is announced each year in March and the awards are made at the Storylines Margaret Mahy Awards Day together with the Margaret Mahy Medal and Lecture, and the announcement of the winners of the Storylines Tessa Duder Award, Tom Fitzgibbon Award, Joy Cowley Award and the Gaelyn Gordon Award for a Much-Loved Book. This event is held in Auckland on the weekend closest to 2 April, International Children’s Book Day (and the birthday of Hans Christian Andersen).

== Eligibility and conditions ==
- The books named as Storylines Notable Books are chosen by a panel of experts (appointed by Storylines) who may include writers, illustrators, teachers, librarians and academics.
- Criteria includes literary merit, book design and editing, plot, characterisation, dialogue and general appeal and appropriateness for the intended audience.
- Books are listed in several categories: Picture Book, Junior Fiction, Young Adult and Non Fiction. For the 2019 Awards, there is a judging panel for the first time for books published in te reo Māori. and Te Reo Māori.
- Up to ten awards are given in each category, although one or two more may be added if the standard is very high.
- Anthologies can be included, as can titles by New Zealand writers and illustrators which have been published internationally.
- Some books which do not make the Notable Books List are given a Special Mention because of their contribution to their particular genre.

== Winners ==
There are always multiple awards handed out and these are split mostly by age. The specifics of each category have changed since it started but overall each can summarised as follows:

- Picture Books Books for children and/or young adults where the narrative is carried equally by pictures and story (age range from birth to 18 years)
- Junior Fiction Fiction suitable for primary and intermediate-aged children (age range from 7 years to 13 years)
- Young Adult Fiction Fiction suitable for upper intermediate and secondary school students (age range from 13 years to 18 years)
- Non-fiction For authoritative, well-designed information books accessible to children and young adults (age range from 3 years to 18 years)
- Notable Te Reo Māori original texts or translations into Te Reo Maori, any genre

Year	Category	Title	Author	Illustrator	Publisher
2000	Picture Books	Mr McGee & the Perfect Nest	Pamela Allen		Penguin Books
2000	Picture Books	The House that Jack Built	Gavin Bishop		Scholastic
2000	Picture Books	The Video Shop Sparrow	Joy Cowley	Gavin Bishop	Mallinson Rendel
2000	Picture Books	Hairy Maclary and Zachary Quack	Lynley Dodd		Mallinson Rendel
2000	Picture Books	Sydney and the Sea Monster	David Elliot		Random House
2000	Picture Books	Mechanical Harry & the Flying Bicycle	Bob Kerr		Mallinson Rendel
2000	Picture Books	The Builder's Cat	Gwenda Turner		Penguin Books
2000	Picture Books	Wooden Fish	Tim Tipene	Jennifer Cooper	Reed Publishers
2000	Picture Books	Foster Dog	Joy Watson	Annabel Craighie	Scholastic
2000	Picture Books	Mouse Opera	Richard Wolfe and Pamela Wolfe		Scholastic
2000	Junior Fiction	Storm	Margaret Beames		Scholastic
2000	Junior Fiction	Call of the Selkie	Jean Bennett	Shawn Shea	Shortland Publications
2000	Junior Fiction	Attacked!	G. Brassi		Scholastic
2000	Junior Fiction	More of the Wild Wests	Joy Cowley		HarperCollins
2000	Junior Fiction	2Much4U	Vince Ford		Scholastic
2000	Junior Fiction	Time Out	David Hill		Mallinson Rendel
2000	Junior Fiction	Three's a Crowd	Penelope Huber		Longacre Press
2000	Junior Fiction	Down in the Dump with Dinsmore [Aussie Bites]	Margaret Mahy		Penguin Books
2000	Junior Fiction	A Villain's Night Out by Margaret Mahy	Margaret Mahy		Penguin Books
2000	Junior Fiction	Going for Gold	Trevor Wilson		Scholastic
2000	Senior Fiction	Playing to Win	Fleur Beale		Scholastic
2000	Senior Fiction	Lester	Bernard Beckett		Longacre Press
2000	Senior Fiction	Golden Prince	Ken Catran		Lothian Books
2000	Senior Fiction	Closed, Stranger	Kate De Goldi		Penguin Books
2000	Senior Fiction	The Tiggie Tompson Show	Tessa Duder		Penguin Books
2000	Senior Fiction	The Raging Quiet	Sherryl Jordan		Macmillan
2000	Senior Fiction	The Shaman and the Droll	Jack Lasenby		Longacre Press
2000	Senior Fiction	He Taonga Tuku Iho- Ngati Porou Stories from the East Cape	Bob McConnell	Manawa o te Rangi Waipara	Reed Publishers
2000	Senior Fiction	Jerome	William Taylor		Longacre Press
2000	Senior Fiction	Love and Other Excuses	Jane Westaway		Longacre Press
2000	Non-Fiction	How to Catch Fish	Colin Anderson	Keith Olsen	Bridge Hill
2000	Non-Fiction	Red-Eyed Tree Frog	Joy Cowley and Nic Bishop		Scholastic
2000	Non-Fiction	The Life-Sized Guide to Insects	Andrew Crowe		Penguin Books
2000	Non-Fiction	I am a Fish	Wade Doak		Reed Publishers
2000	Non-Fiction	Who's Wild and Free?	Terry Fitzgibbon		Penguin Books
2000	Non-Fiction	Wildlife Stuff	Dave Gunson		Scholastic
2000	Non-Fiction	Anzacs at Gallipoli	John Lockyer and Chris Pugsley		Reed Publishers
2000	Non-Fiction	Te Wao Nui a Tane	Hirini Melbourne	Te Maari Gardiner	Huia Publishers
2000	Non-Fiction	100 New Zealand Poems for Children	Jo Noble	David Elliot	Random House
2000	Non-Fiction	Myths and Legends of Aotearoa	Annie Rae Te Ake Ake		Scholastic
2001	Picture Books	Inside Mary Elizabeth's House	Pamela Allen		Penguin
2001	Picture Books	Jane and the Dragon	Martin Baynton		Walker Books
2001	Picture Books	Oliver in the Garden	Margaret Beames and Sue Hitchcock		Scholastic
2001	Picture Books	Stay Awake, Bear!	Gavin Bishop		Orchard Books/Scholastic
2001	Picture Books	Apple Banana Cherry	Joy Cowley	Elizabeth Fuller	Scholastic
2001	Picture Books	Sydney and the Whalebird	David Elliot		Random House
2001	Picture Books	After the War	Bob Kerr		Mallinson Rendell
2001	Picture Books	Dragor	Pat Quinn and Philip Webb		Scholastic
2001	Picture Books	Timo and the Kingfish	Mokena Potae Reedy and Elton Gregory		Huia Publishers
2001	Picture Books	The Puriri Tree: Te Puriri	Marito Tawhara and Nikki Slade-Robinson		Huia Publishers
2001	Junior Fiction	Mayday!	G Brassi		Scholastic
2001	Junior Fiction	Shadrach Girl	Joy Cowley		Penguin Books
2001	Junior Fiction	Jenna's Wave	Steve Dickinson		Scholastic
2001	Junior Fiction	The Lies of Harry Whakatipu	Jack Lasenby		Longacre Press
2001	Junior Fiction	Crab Apples	Ged Maybury		Scholastic
2001	Junior Fiction	A Whistle from the Blunder	Diana Noonan		Longacre Press
2001	Junior Fiction	Black Gold	Julia Owen		Scholastic
2001	Junior Fiction	Call of the Cruins	Elizabeth Pulford		Scholastic
2001	Junior Fiction	Jellylegs	Elizabeth Pulford		Scholastic
2001	Junior Fiction	Crash: The Story of Poddy	William Taylor		Scholastic
2001	Senior Fiction	Outlanders	Margaret Beames		Scholastic
2001	Senior Fiction	Red Cliff	Bernard Beckett		Longacre Press
2001	Senior Fiction	The Mora Stone	Agnes-Mary Brooke		Addenda
2001	Senior Fiction	Talking to Blue	Ken Catran		Lothian Books
2001	Senior Fiction	Voyage with Jason	Ken Catran		Lothian Books
2001	Senior Fiction	Leon	Frances Cherry		Mallinson Rendell
2001	Senior Fiction	Finns Quest: The Queen Seekers	Eiryls Hunter		Scholastic
2001	Senior Fiction	The Waverider	Graeme Lay		Penguin
2001	Senior Fiction	24 Hours	Margaret Mahy		HarperCollins
2001	Senior Fiction	Scarface and the Angel	William Taylor		Longacre Press
2001	Non-Fiction	Big Farm Machines	Pauline Cartwright and Tim Hawkins		Bridge Hill
2001	Non-Fiction	Amazing New Zealand	Chris Chittenden		Reed
2001	Non-Fiction	Niue	Charles Cooper		Reed
2001	Non-Fiction	The Zoo: Meet the Locals	Colin Hogg		Random House
2001	Non-Fiction	The Kiwi	John Lockyer and Rod Morris		Reed
2001	Non-Fiction	The Weta	John Lockyer and Rod Morris		Reed
2001	Non-Fiction	Pets and Other Animals	Graham Meadows		Bridge Hill
2001	Non-Fiction	The Tuatara	Brian Parkinson		Reed
2001	Non-Fiction	Possum Hunt	Frank Saxton		Reed
2001	Non-Fiction	Whales and Dolphins	Barbara Todd		Random
2002	Picture Books	Brown Bread and Honey	Pamela Allen		Penguin Books
2002	Picture Books	The Terrible Q	Tanya Batt	Trevor Pye	Scholastic
2002	Picture Books	Tom Thumb	Gavin Bishop		Random House
2002	Picture Books	My Brown Bear Barney at the Party	Dorothy Butler	Elizabeth Fuller	Reed Books
2002	Picture Books	Brodie	Joy Cowley	Chris Mousdale	Scholastic
2002	Picture Books	Scarface Claw	Lynley Dodd		Mallinson Rendel
2002	Picture Books	Desert Dessert	Perrin Hopkins	Jenna Packer	Scholastic
2002	Picture Books	Down the Dragon's Tongue	Margaret Mahy	Patricia McCarthy	HarperCollins
2002	Picture Books	The Last Whale/Te Tohora Whakamutunga	Rene Hapimarika Ban de Weert	Anton Petrov	Reed Publishing
2002	Picture Books	Grandpa's Shorts	Joy Watson	Wendy Hodder	Scholastic
2002	Junior Fiction	Ambushed	Fleur Beale		Scholastic
2002	Junior Fiction	Skull Island	G. Brassi		Scholastic
2002	Junior Fiction	The Weather-makers	Shirley Corlett		Scholastic
2002	Junior Fiction	The Wild Wests and the Haunted Fridge	Joy Cowley		HarperCollins
2002	Junior Fiction	The Great Pavlova Cover-up and Other Stories	Jo Noble	Jennifer Cooper	Cumulus
2002	Junior Fiction	The Sleeper Wakes	David Hill		Penguin Books
2002	Junior Fiction	Coldkeep Castle [Finn’s Quest, Book 2]	Eiryls Hunter		Scholastic
2002	Junior Fiction	Recycled	Sandy McKay		Longacre Press
2002	Junior Fiction	The Riddle of the Frozen Phantom	Margaret Mahy		HarperCollins
2002	Junior Fiction	Knocked For Six	Alison Robertson		Scholastic
2002	Senior Fiction	Jolt	Bernard Beckett		Longacre Press
2002	Senior Fiction	Blue Murder	Ken Catran		Lothian Books
2002	Senior Fiction	Road Kill	Ken Catran		Random House
2002	Senior Fiction	Taken at the Flood	Ken Catran		Random House
2002	Senior Fiction	Tiggie Tompson All at Sea	Tessa Duder		Penguin Books
2002	Senior Fiction	The High Wind Blows	David Hill		Penguin Books
2002	Senior Fiction	Kalik	Jack Lasenby		Longacre Press
2002	Senior Fiction	Return to One Foot Island	Graeme Lay		Penguin Books
2002	Senior Fiction	Owl	Joanna Orwin		Longacre Press
2002	Senior Fiction	Peri	Penelope Todd		Longacre Press
2002	Non-Fiction	Another 100 New Zealand Poems for Children	Rachael McAlpine	David Elliot	Random House
2002	Non-Fiction	Looking for Larry	Theo Baynton		Scholastic
2002	Non-Fiction	A Book of Pacific Lullabies	Tessa Duder	Anton Petrov	HarperCollins
2002	Non-Fiction	Which New Zealand Bird?	Andrew Crowe	Dave Gunson	Penguin Books
2002	Non-Fiction	The Plight of the Penguin	Lloyd Spencer Davis		Longacre Press
2002	Non-Fiction	Fibonacci's Cows	Ray Galvin		Shortland Publications
2002	Non-Fiction	In the Beginning	Peter Gossage		Scholastic
2002	Non-Fiction	Land Snails	Jenny Jones		Heinemann
2002	Non-Fiction	I am a Spider	Simon Pollard		Reed Publishing
2002	Non-Fiction	The Reed Maori Picture Dictionary	Margaret Sinclair and Ross Calman	Dale Tutill	Reed Books
2003	Picture Books	Daisy All-Sorts	Pamela Allen		Viking
2003	Picture Books	Potato People	Pamela Allen		Viking
2003	Picture Books	The Immigrants	Alan Bagnall	Sarah Wilkins	Mallinson Rendel
2003	Picture Books	The Christmas Caravan	Jennifer Beck	Robyn Belton	Scholastic
2003	Picture Books	Duck Walk	Joy Cowley	Jennifer Cooper	Scholastic
2003	Picture Books	Pigtails the Pirate	David Elliot		Random House
2003	Picture Books	Dashing Dog	Margaret Mahy		HarperCollins
2003	Picture Books	Why Do Dogs Sniff Bottoms?	Dawn McMillan and Bert Signal	Ross Kinnaird	Reed
2003	Picture Books	Auntie Rosie and the Rabbit	Diana Noonan	Christine Ross	Scholastic
2003	Picture Books	The Best Dressed Bear	Diana Noonan	Elizabeth Fuller	Random House
2003	Junior Fiction	Duster	Margaret Beames		Scholastic
2003	Junior Fiction	Something Weird about Mr Foster	Ken Catran		Scholastic
2003	Junior Fiction	Froghopper	Joy Cowley		HarperCollins
2003	Junior Fiction	Possums2U	Vince Ford		Scholastic
2003	Junior Fiction	A Friend in Paradise	Des Hunt		HarperCollins
2003	Junior Fiction	Buddy	V M Jones		HarperCollins
2003	Junior Fiction	My Dad, the All Black	Sandy McKay		Longacre
2003	Junior Fiction	When the Kehua Calls	Kingi McKinnon		Scholastic
2003	Junior Fiction	The Dragon's Apprentice	Linda McNabb		HarperCollins
2003	Junior Fiction	Not Even	Liz Van Der Laarse		Reed
2003	Senior Fiction	Lucky for Some	Fleur Beale		Scholastic
2003	Senior Fiction	No Alarms	Bernard Beckett		Longacre
2003	Senior Fiction	Letters from the Coffin-Trenches	Ken Catran		Random House
2003	Senior Fiction	Tomorrow the Dark	Ken Catran		Random House
2003	Senior Fiction	When the War Came Home	Sarah Ell		Scholastic
2003	Senior Fiction	Right Where it Hurts	David Hill		Mallinson Rendel
2003	Senior Fiction	The Thin Line	V R Joseph		Mallinson Rendel
2003	Senior Fiction	Alchemy	Margaret Mahy		HarperCollins
2003	Senior Fiction	Spider	William Taylor		Longacre
2003	Senior Fiction	Boy Next Door	Penelope Todd		Longacre
2003	Non-Fiction	The Kauri [New Zealand Trees]	Alina Arkins	Len Doel	Reed
2003	Non-Fiction	Weta: A Knight in Shining Armour	Joy Cowley	Rod Morris	Scholastic
2003	Non-Fiction	Sea Fishing with Crimpy	Daryl Crimp	Tony Entwhistle	Reed
2003	Non-Fiction	Which New Zealand Insect?	Andrew Crowe		Penguin Books
2003	Non-Fiction	My Maori Colours	Tracy Duncan		Reed
2003	Non-Fiction	Hinemoa and Tutaneki	Peter Gossage		Reed
2003	Non-Fiction	The Life and Times of the Giant Kauri	Dave Gunson		Reed
2003	Non-Fiction	Mission to East Timor	Glyn Harper		Reed
2003	Non-Fiction	Weaving Earth And Sky: Myths & Legends of Aotearoa	Robert Sullivan	Gavin Bishop	Random House
2003	Non-Fiction	The Shaping of New Zealand [New Zealand Wild]	Brian O'Flaherty		Reed
2004	Picture Books	Cuthbert's Babies	Pamela Allen		Viking
2004	Picture Books	Grandpa and Thomas	Pamela Allen		Viking
2004	Picture Books	The Three Billy Goats Gruff	Gavin Bishop		Scholastic NZ
2004	Picture Books	Mrs Wishy-Washy's Farm	Joy Cowley	Elizabeth Fuller	Scholastic NZ
2004	Picture Books	Matariki (English and Māori versions)	Melanie Drewery	Bruce Potter	Reed Publishing
2004	Picture Books	Pania of the Reef	Peter Gossage		Reed Publishing
2004	Picture Books	Selafina	Catherine Hannken	Trish Bowles	Mallinson Rendel
2004	Picture Books	Oh Hogwash, Sweet Pea!	Ngāreta Gabel	Ali Teo, Astrid Jensen	Huia Publishers
2004	Picture Books	Grandpa's Shed	Joy Watson	Wendy Hodder	Scholastic NZ
2004	Picture Books	Enough is Enough!	Scott Willis	Jenna Packer	Scholastic Australia
2004	Junior Fiction	Fred the (Quite) Brave Mouse	Murray Ball		Scholastic NZ
2004	Junior Fiction	Evil Fred by Kylie Begg	Jacob Leaf		Scholastic NZ
2004	Junior Fiction	Froghopper and the Paua Poachers	Joy Cowley		HarperCollins
2004	Junior Fiction	Henry and the Flea	Brian Falkner		Mallinson Rendel
2004	Junior Fiction	A Handful of Blue	Vince Ford		Scholastic NZ
2004	Junior Fiction	Journey to Tangiwai - the Diary of Peter Cotterill, Napier 1953 [My Story]	David Hill		Scholastic NZ
2004	Junior Fiction	No Big Deal	David Hill		Penguin Books
2004	Junior Fiction	Juggling with Mandarins	V M Jones		HarperCollins
2004	Junior Fiction	The Serpents of Arakesh [The Karazan Quartet, Book 1]	V M Jones		HarperCollins
2004	Junior Fiction	Mystery at Tui Bay	Janet Pates		Scholastic NZ
2004	Young Adult Fiction	Eyes in the Shadows	Alan Bunn		Scholastic NZ
2004	Young Adult Fiction	Lin and the Red Stranger	Ken Catran		Random House
2004	Young Adult Fiction	Thunder Road	Ted Dawe		Longacre Press
2004	Young Adult Fiction	Tiggie Tompson's Longest Journey	Tessa Duder		Penguin Books
2004	Young Adult Fiction	No Safe Harbour	David Hill		Mallinson Rendel
2004	Young Adult Fiction	High Tide	Anna McKenzie		Scholastic NZ
2004	Young Adult Fiction	Roivan	Glynne Maclean		Penguin Books
2004	Young Adult Fiction	Watermark	Penelope Todd		Longacre Press
2004	Non-Fiction	Hook, Line and Sinker: an Essential Guide to New Zealand Fish	Daryl Crimp		HarperCollins
2004	Non-Fiction	The Life-Size Guide to New Zealand Wildflowers	Andrew Crowe		Penguin Books
2004	Non-Fiction	Glow-worms [New Zealand Wild]	George Gibbs		Reed Publishing
2004	Non-Fiction	A Bird in the Hand: Keeping New Zealand Wildlife Safe	Janet Hunt		Random House
2004	Non-Fiction	To the Max: A Teen Reader's Version of No Mean Feat	Mark Inglis		Random House
2004	Non-Fiction	Pick up a Pack: A Guide to Tramping and Camping the New Zealand Way	Keith Olsen		Reed Publishing
2004	Non-Fiction	I am an Insect	Dr Simon Pollard		Reed Publishing
2004	Non-Fiction	Toroa - the Royal Albatross	Te Aorere Riddell		Huia Publishers
2004	Non-Fiction	Motorcross [Kiwi Extreme]	Ian and Jan Trafford		Reed Publishing
2004	Non-Fiction	The Treaty/Te Tiriti	Mere Whaanga		Scholastic NZ
2005	Picture Books	Mr McGee and the Big Bag of Bread	Pamela Allen		Penguin
2005	Picture Books	The Princess and the White Bear King	Tanya Batt	Nicoletta Ceccoli	Barefoot Books
2005	Picture Books	Taming the Sun: Four Māori Myths	Gavin Bishop		Random House
2005	Picture Books	The Night Kite: Poems for Children	Peter Bland	Carl Bland	Mallinson Rendel
2005	Picture Books	The Wishing of Biddy Malone	Joy Cowley	Christopher Denise	Penguin
2005	Picture Books	The Other Ark	Lynley Dodd		Mallinson Rendel
2005	Picture Books	Koro’s Medicine	Melanie Drewery	Sabrina Malcolm	Huia
2005	Picture Books	Clubs: A Lolly Leopold Story	Kate De Goldi	Jacqui Colley	Trapeze
2005	Picture Books	The Biggest Number in the Universe	Julie Leibrich	Ross Kinnaird	Scholastic
2005	Picture Books	Godwit's Journey	Sandra Morris		Reed
2005	Junior Fiction	A New Song in the Land: The Writings of Atapo, Paihia, c.1840 [My Story]	Fleur Beale		Scholastic
2005	Junior Fiction	Walking Lightly	Michaela Sangl		Mallinson Rendel
2005	Junior Fiction	You've Got Guts, Kenny Melrose	Shirley Corlett		Scholastic
2005	Junior Fiction	Wild West Hullabalo	Joy Cowley		Harper Collins
2005	Junior Fiction	Claws and Jaws: 30 New Zealand Animal Stories	Barbara Else	Philip Webb	Random House
2005	Junior Fiction	The Real Thing	Brian Falkner		Mallinson Rendel
2005	Junior Fiction	Beyond the Shroud [The Karazan Quartet, Book 2]	V.M. Jones		HarperCollins
2005	Junior Fiction	Prince of the Wind [The Karazan Quartet, Book 3]	V.M. Jones		HarperCollins
2005	Junior Fiction	Aunt Effie and the Island that Sank	Jack Lasenby		Scholastic
2005	Junior Fiction	The Stonekeeper's Daughter	Linda McNabb		
2005	Young Adult Fiction	Malcolm and Juliet	Bernard Beckett		Longacre
2005	Young Adult Fiction	On a Good Day	Deborah Burnside		Penguin
2005	Young Adult Fiction	Robert Moran: Private	Ken Catran		Lothian
2005	Young Adult Fiction	Seal Boy	Ken Catran		Lothian
2005	Young Adult Fiction	The Swap	Wendy Catran		Lothian
2005	Young Adult Fiction	Coming Back	David Hill		Mallinson Rendel
2005	Young Adult Fiction	The Hunting of the Last Dragon	Sherryl Jordan		Simon & Schuster
2005	Young Adult Fiction	Cross Tides	Lorraine Orman		Longacre
2005	Young Adult Fiction	Out of Tune	Joanna Orwin		Longacre
2005	Young Adult Fiction	Dark	Penelope Todd		Longacre
2005	Non-Fiction	Antarctica: The Unfolding Story	Margaret Andrew		Waiatarua
2005	Non-Fiction	Bats [Nature Kids series]	Alina Arkins	Len Doel	Reed
2005	Non-Fiction	Shorebirds [Nature Kid]	Alina Arkins	Len Doel	Reed
2005	Non-Fiction	John Britten: The Boy who did do Better	Jennifer Beck		Scholastic
2005	Non-Fiction	The Life-Size Guide to the New Zealand Beach	Andrew Crowe		Penguin
2005	Non-Fiction	The Silver Ferns' Way to Play Netball	Jane Hunt		HarperCollins
2005	Non-Fiction	From Weta to Kauri: A Guide to the New Zealand Forest	Jane Hunt	Rob Lucas	Random House New Zealand
2005	Non-Fiction	Everything You Need to Know About the World	Lloyd Jones	Timon Maxey	Four Winds Press
2005	Non-Fiction	Welcome to the South Seas: Contemporary New Zealand Art for Young People	Gregory O'Brien		Auckland University Press
2005	Non-Fiction	Boating Fun	Mike and Dee Pigneguy		Reed
2006	Picture Books	Where's the Gold?	Pamela Allen		Penguin / Viking
2006	Picture Books	Nobody's Dog	Jennifer Beck	Lindy Fisher	Scholastic New Zealand
2006	Picture Books	Kiwi Moon	Gavin Bishop		Random House New Zealand
2006	Picture Books	A Booming in the Night	Ben Brown		Reed Publishing
2006	Picture Books	Zachary Quack Minimonster	Lynley Dodd		Mallinson Rendel
2006	Picture Books	Nanny Mihi's Christmas	Melanie Drewery	Tracy Duncan	Reed Publishing
2006	Picture Books	The Whale Rider	Witi Ihimaera	Bruce Potter	Reed Publishing
2006	Picture Books	Marta and the Manger Straw	Virginia Kroll	Robyn Belton	Zonderkidz, USA
2006	Picture Books	The Waka	Jean Prior	Gavin Bishop	Scholastic New Zealand
2006	Picture Books	Te Waka	Kāterina Te Heikoko Mataira and Jean Prior	Gavin Bishop	Scholastic New Zealand
2006	Junior Fiction	Janie Olive	Fifi Colston		Scholastic New Zealand
2006	Junior Fiction	Through Thick and Thin	Shirley Corlett		Scholastic New Zealand
2006	Junior Fiction	Hunter	Joy Cowley		Puffin
2006	Junior Fiction	Super Freak	Brian Falkner		Mallinson Rendel
2006	Junior Fiction	Stella Star	Brigid Feehan		Scholastic New Zealand
2006	Junior Fiction	Sil	Jill Harris		Longacre Press
2006	Junior Fiction	The Moa Cave	Des Hunt		HarperCollins Publishers
2006	Junior Fiction	Maddigan's Fantasia	Margaret Mahy		HarperCollins Publishers
2006	Junior Fiction	China town Girl; The Diary of Silvey Chan, Auckland, 1942 [My Story]	Eva Wong Ng		Scholastic New Zealand
2006	Junior Fiction	What about Bo?	Jillian Sullivan		Scholastic New Zealand
2006	Young Adult Fiction	Deep Fried	Bernard Beckett and Clare Knighton		Longacre Press
2006	Young Adult Fiction	Sea of Mutiny	Ken Catran		Random House New Zealand
2006	Young Adult Fiction	Talking to Adam	Sarah Ell		Scholastic New Zealand
2006	Young Adult Fiction	Bodies and Soul	David Hill		Scholastic New Zealand
2006	Young Adult Fiction	Running Hot	David Hill		Mallinson Rendel
2006	Young Adult Fiction	Like Wallpaper. New Zealand Short Stories for Teenagers	Barbara Else		Random House New Zealand
2006	Young Adult Fiction	With Lots of Love from Georgia	Brigid Lowry		Allen & Unwin
2006	Young Adult Fiction	Kaitangata Twitch	Margaret Mahy		Allen & Unwin
2006	Young Adult Fiction	The Unknown Zone	Phil Smith		Random House New Zealand
2006	Young Adult Fiction	Land of Milk and Honey	William Taylor		HarperCollins Publishers
2006	Non-Fiction	Cameras in Narnia: How the Lion, the Witch and the Wardrobe Came to Life	Ian Brodie		HarperCollins Publishers
2006	Non-Fiction	Incredible Science	Alison Brook, University of Auckland		Penguin Books
2006	Non-Fiction	Don't Just Sit There	Tony Christiansen with Liz Dobson		HarperCollins Publishers
2006	Non-Fiction	Chameleon, Chameleon	Joy Cowley	Nic Bishop	Scholastic
2006	Non-Fiction	Scarecrow Army: The Anzacs at Gallipoli	Leon Davison		Black Dog Books
2006	Non-Fiction	Filthy Flies and other Bad Bugs	Rod Morris		Reed Publishing
2006	Non-Fiction	Even More Things You Need to Know about the World	Lloyd Jones	Timon Maxey	Four Winds Press
2006	Non-Fiction	Frontier of Dreams: The Story of New Zealand (Four volume set)	John Parker		Scholastic New Zealand
2006	Non-Fiction	Peter Blake Sailor, Adventurer: The Story of a New Zealand Hero	Alan Sefton		Puffin
2006	Non-Fiction	Plants, Animals, Environments: A Visual Guide [Blue New Zealand]	Glenys Stace		Puffin
2007	Picture Books	Share Said the Rooster	Pamela Allen		Viking
2007	Picture Books	A Present from the Past	Jennifer Beck	Lindy Fisher	Scholastic New Zealand
2007	Picture Books	Riding the Waves: Four Māori Myths	Gavin Bishop		Random House New Zealand
2007	Picture Books	Greedy Cat and the Sneeze	Joy Cowley	Robyn Belton	Scholastic New Zealand
2007	Picture Books	Billy: A Lolly Leopold Story	Kate De Goldi	Jacqui Colley	Trapeze
2007	Picture Books	Itiiti's Gift	Melanie Drewery	Fifi Colston	Reed
2007	Picture Books	The Three Fishing Brothers Gruff	Ben Galbraith		Hodder Children's Books
2007	Picture Books	Matatuhi	Robyn Kahukiwa		Puffin
2007	Picture Books	Kiss! Kiss! Yuck! Yuck!	Kyle Mewburn	Ali Teo, John O'Reilly	Scholastic New Zealand
2007	Picture Books	Barnaby Bennett	Hannah Rainforth	Ali Teo	Huia Publishers
2007	Junior Fiction	And Did Those Feet…	Ted Dawe		Longacre Press
2007	Junior Fiction	Boyznbikes	Vince Ford		Scholastic New Zealand
2007	Junior Fiction	Ocean Without End [The Swashbuckler Trilogy, Book 1]	Kelly Gardiner		HarperCollins
2007	Junior Fiction	Frog Whistle Mine	Des Hunt		HarperCollins
2007	Junior Fiction	Thor's Tale: Endurance and Adventure in the Southern Ocean	Janice Marriott		HarperCollins
2007	Junior Fiction	The Unquiet	Carolyn McCurdie		Longacre Press
2007	Junior Fiction	Mind Over Matter	Heather McQuillan		Scholastic New Zealand
2007	Junior Fiction	Old Bones	Bill Nagelkerke		Scholastic New Zealand
2007	Junior Fiction	Castaway: The Diary of Samuel Abraham Clark, Disappointment Island, 1907 [My Story]	Bill O'Brien		Scholastic New Zealand
2007	Junior Fiction	The Whizbanger That Emmental Built	Reuben Schwarz		Puffin
2007	Young Adult Fiction	A Respectable Girl	Fleur Beale		Random House New Zealand
2007	Young Adult Fiction	Spirit of the Deep	Margaret Beames		Lothian
2007	Young Adult Fiction	Genesis	Bernard Beckett		Longacre Press
2007	Young Adult Fiction	Paperchase	G. Brassi		Scholastic New Zealand
2007	Young Adult Fiction	Red Leader Down	Ken Catran		Random House New Zealand
2007	Young Adult Fiction	Aim High	David Hill		Mallinson Rendel Publishers
2007	Young Adult Fiction	Shooting the Moon	V.M. Jones		HarperCollins
2007	Young Adult Fiction	Face It	Denis Martin		Puffin
2007	Young Adult Fiction	Single Fin	Aaron Topp		Random House New Zealand
2007	Young Adult Fiction	Thieves	Ella West		Longacre Press
2007	Non-Fiction	Red Haze: Australians and New Zealanders in Vietnam	Leon Davidson		Black Dog Books
2007	Non-Fiction	Bird's-Eye View: Through the Eyes of New Zealand Birds	Maria Gill	Darryl Torckler, Geoff Moon	Penguin
2007	Non-Fiction	Flamingo Bendalingo: Poems from the Zoo	Paula Green and fifty children	Michael Hight	Auckland University Press
2007	Non-Fiction	Celebrating Matariki	Libby Hakaraia		Reed
2007	Non-Fiction	It’s True! You Can Make Your Own Jokes	Sharon Holt	Ross Kinnaird	Allen & Unwin
2007	Non-Fiction	Soldier in the Yellow Socks: Charles Upham – Our Finest Fighting Soldier	Janice Marriott	Bruce Potter	HarperCollins
2007	Non-Fiction	What is on Top?	John Parker	Glenn Jowitt	Scholastic New Zealand
2007	Non-Fiction	Winging It: The Adventures of Tim Wallis	Neville Peat		Longacre Press
2007	Non-Fiction	The Illustrated History of the South Pacific	Marcia Stenson		Random House New Zealand
2007	Non-Fiction	Fighting Past Each Other: The New Zealand Wars 1845-1875	Matthew Wright	Suzy Brown	Reed
2008	Picture Books	Is Your Grandmother a Goanna?	Pamela Allen		Penguin Australia
2008	Picture Books	The Bean's Story	Tatiana Aslund	Vasanti Unka	Scholastic New Zealand
2008	Picture Books	Rats!	Gavin Bishop		Random House NZ
2008	Picture Books	Hairy Maclary's Hat Tricks	Lynley Dodd		Mallinson Rendel
2008	Picture Books	Dad's Takeaways	Melanie Drewery	Christopher White	Mallinson Rendel
2008	Picture Books	The Grumble Rumble Mumbler	Melanie Drewery	Loudmouth Productions	Huia Publishers
2008	Picture Books	Tahi: One Lucky Kiwi	Melanie Drewery	Ali Teo, John O'Reilly	Random House NZ
2008	Picture Books	Mere McKaskill's Boil-up	Tracy Duncan		Reed
2008	Picture Books	No Room for a Mouse	Kyle Mewburn	Freya Blackwood	Scholastic Australia
2008	Picture Books	The Puppet Box	Moira Wairama	Bruce Potter	Scholastic New Zealand
2008	Junior Fiction	Snake and Lizard	Joy Cowley	Gavin Bishop	Gecko Press
2008	Junior Fiction	The Mad Tadpole Adventure	Melanie Drewery	Jenny Cooper	Scholastic New Zealand
2008	Junior Fiction	The Dumpster Saga	Craig Harrison		Scholastic New Zealand
2008	Junior Fiction	Shadows in the Ice	Des Hunt		HarperCollins
2008	Junior Fiction	Dead Dan's Dee	Phyllis Johnston		Longacre Press
2008	Junior Fiction	What Happened That Day	Marie Langley		Reed
2008	Junior Fiction	Taking Off	Janice Marriott		HarperCollins
2008	Junior Fiction	Yo, Shark Bait!	Vicki Simpson		Scholastic New Zealand
2008	Junior Fiction	Archie's Adventures	Leonie Jayne Thorpe		HarperCollins
2008	Junior Fiction	The Great Chocolate Cake Bake-off	Philippa Werry		Scholastic New Zealand
2008	Young Adult Fiction	The Transformation of Minna Hargeaves	Fleur Beale		Random House NZ
2008	Young Adult Fiction	Monsters of Blood and Honour	Ken Catran		Random House NZ
2008	Young Adult Fiction	Salt	Maurice Gee		Penguin
2008	Young Adult Fiction	In Too Deep	DC Grant		Scholastic New Zealand
2008	Young Adult Fiction	Smashed	Mandy Hager		Random House NZ
2008	Young Adult Fiction	Time of the Eagle	Sherryl Jordan		Simon & Schuster
2008	Young Adult Fiction	Losing It	Sandy McKay		Longacre Press
2008	Young Adult Fiction	The Sea-wreck Stranger	Anna Mackenzie		Longacre Press
2008	Young Adult Fiction	Hideout	Lorraine Orman		Longacre Press
2008	Young Adult Fiction	Zillah	Penelope Todd		Longacre Press
2008	Non-Fiction	Draw New Zealand Birds	Heather Arnold	Geoff Moon, Rod Morris	Reed
2008	Non-Fiction	Weather Watch New Zealand	Sandra Carrod		Reed
2008	Non-Fiction	The Dalai Lama Story	Andrew Crowe		Longacre Press
2008	Non-Fiction	Which New Zealand Spider?	Andrew Crowe		Penguin
2008	Non-Fiction	Rubbish	Rachael Goddard	Moira Corridan, Cheryl Reynolds	Reed
2008	Non-Fiction	Reaching the Summit: Sir Edmund Hillary's Story	Alexa Johnston with David Larsen		Puffin Books
2008	Non-Fiction	Poetry Pudding: A Delicious Collection of Rhyme and Wit	Jenny Argante	Debbie Tipuna	Reed
2008	Non-Fiction	Illustrated History of Antarctica	Marcia Stenson		Random House NZ
2008	Non-Fiction	What is a …? Series	Feana Tu'akoi		Scholastic New Zealand
2009	Picture Books	Herbert, the Brave Sea Dog	Robyn Belton		Craig Potton Publishing
2009	Picture Books	The Apple	Ben Brown	Tracy Duncan	Puffin
2009	Picture Books	Kei te Pehea Koe? How Do You Feel?	Tracy Duncan		Puffin
2009	Picture Books	Every Second Friday	Kiri Lightfoot	Ben Galbraith	Hodder Children's Books
2009	Picture Books	Piggity-Wiggity Jiggity Jig	Diana Neild	Philip Webb	Scholastic
2009	Picture Books	The Seven Stars of Matariki	Toni Rolleston-Cummins	Nikki Slade-Robinson	Huia
2009	Picture Books	Roadworks	Sally Sutton	Brian Lovelock	Walker Books
2009	Picture Books	The Were-Nana (Not a Bedtime Story)	Melinda Szymanik	Sarah Nelisiwe Anderson	Scholastic
2009	Junior Fiction	Night Hunting	Deborah Burnside	Jeff Fowler	Puffin
2009	Junior Fiction	Five (and a Bit) Days in the Life of Ozzie Kingsford	Val Bird	Rebecca Cundy	Random House
2009	Junior Fiction	Big Fish, Little Fish	Melanie Drewery		Raupo
2009	Junior Fiction	Payback	Michelle Kelly		Scholastic
2009	Junior Fiction	Old Drumble	Jack Lasenby		HarperCollins
2009	Junior Fiction	Thornspell	Helen Lowe		Alfred A. Knopf
2009	Junior Fiction	Land of Promise: The Diary of William Donahue, Gravesend to Wellington, 1839–40	Lorraine Orman		Scholastic [My Story]
2009	Junior Fiction	“Why I Hate School”	Michael Fatarsky		Scholastic
2009	Junior Fiction	Freaky Fish	Feana Tu'akoi	Eleanor Meecham	Puffin [Kiwi Bites]
2009	Young Adult Fiction	Juno of Taris	Fleur Beale		Random House
2009	Young Adult Fiction	The 10 PM Question	Kate De Goldi		Longacre Press
2009	Young Adult Fiction	The Tomorrow Code	Brian Falkner		Walker Books
2009	Young Adult Fiction	Scorched Bone [Chronicles of Stone, Book 1]	Vince Ford		Scholastic
2009	Young Adult Fiction	Gool	Maurice Gee		Puffin Books
2009	Young Adult Fiction	Shadow of the Mountain	Anna Mackenzie		Longacre Press
2009	Non-Fiction	Piano Rock: A 1950s Childhood	Gavin Bishop		Random House
2009	Non-Fiction	High-tech Legs of Everest	Mark Inglis with Sarah Ell		Random House
2009	Non-Fiction	Let's Get Art: Children Look at Contemporary New Zealand Art	Brad Irwin	John Ward Knox	Random House
2009	Non-Fiction	Juicy Writing: Inspiration and Techniques for Young Writers	Brigid Lowry		Allen and Unwin
2009	Non-Fiction	Atoms, Dinosaurs and DNA: 68 Great New Zealand Scientists	Veronika Meduna and Rebecca Priestley		Random House
2009	Non-Fiction	Back and Beyond: New Zealand Painting for the Young and Curious	Gregory O'Brien		Auckland University Press
2009	Non-Fiction	Learn to Skateboard with Luka	Tokikapu Peta		Raupo
2009	Non-Fiction	How to Make a Piupiu	Leilani Rickard		Raupo
2010	Picture Books	Our Daft Dog Danny	Pamela Allen		Penguin / Viking
2010	Picture Books	The Toymaker and the Bird	Pamela Allen		Penguin / Viking
2010	Picture Books	There was a Crooked Man		Gavin Bishop	Gecko Press
2010	Picture Books	Cowshed Christmas	Joy Cowley	Gavin Bishop	Random House New Zealand
2010	Picture Books	Greedy Cat and the Goldfish	Joy Cowley	Robyn Belton	Scholastic New Zealand
2010	Picture Books	The Cat with No Name	Sher Foley	Brian Lovelock	Scholastic New Zealand
2010	Picture Books	Aunt Concertina and her Niece Evalina	Paula Green	Michael Hight	Random House New Zealand
2010	Picture Books	Your Mother Didn’t Do That!	Sharon Holt	Brian Lovelock	Walker Books Australia
2010	Picture Books	Old Hu-Hu	Kyle Mewburn	Rachel Driscoll	Scholastic New Zealand
2010	Picture Books	Tiny Miss Dott and her Dotty Umbrella	Michelle Osment	Sarah Nelisiwe Anderson	Scholastic New Zealand
2010	Junior Fiction	Saffron	Victoria Azaro		Mallinson Rendel
2010	Junior Fiction	Glory	Fifi Colston		Scholastic New Zealand
2010	Junior Fiction	Friends: Snake and Lizard	Joy Cowley	Gavin Bishop	Gecko Press
2010	Junior Fiction	Dog Tucker	K. Drinkwater		Scholastic New Zealand
2010	Junior Fiction	Salt River	Elizabeth Hegarty		Scholastic New Zealand
2010	Junior Fiction	Sting	Raymond Huber		Walker Books Australia
2010	Junior Fiction	The Secret of Jelly Mountain	Des Hunt		Scholastic New Zealand
2010	Junior Fiction	The Dark Blue 100-Ride Bus Ticket	Margaret Mahy		HarperCollins New Zealand
2010	Junior Fiction	Doghead	Jill Marshall		Macmillan Children’s Books
2010	Junior Fiction	The Strange and Diverting Story of the Loblolly Boy	James Norcliffe		Longacre Press
2010	Young Adult Fiction	End of the Alphabet	Fleur Beale		Random House New Zealand
2010	Young Adult Fiction	Saving Sam	Susan Brocker		HarperCollins New Zealand
2010	Young Adult Fiction	Brainjack	Brian Falkner		Walker Books Australia
2010	Young Adult Fiction	Tribal Ash [Chronicles of Stone; book 3]	Vince Ford		Scholastic New Zealand
2010	Young Adult Fiction	The Crossing [Blood of the Lamb; book 1]	Mandy Hager		Random House New Zealand
2010	Young Adult Fiction	Banquo’s Son	Tania Roxborogh		Penguin New Zealand
2010	Young Adult Fiction	About Griffen’s Heart	Tina Shaw		Longacre Press
2010	Non-Fiction	Counting the Stars: Four Māori Myths	Gavin Bishop		Random House New Zealand
2010	Non-Fiction	Ben and Mark: Boys of the High Country	Christine Fernyhough	John Bougen	Random House New Zealand
2010	Non-Fiction	Save Our Seas	Maria Gill		New Holland
2010	Non-Fiction	Blast! Pat Hanley – The Painter and His Protests	Trish Gribben		Lopdell House
2010	Non-Fiction	E3 Call Home	Janet Hunt		Random House New Zealand
2010	Non-Fiction	Willie Apiata, VC the Reluctant Hero	Paul Little with John Lockyer		Puffin New Zealand
2010	Non-Fiction	Nature’s Techno Tricks: Biomimetrics: Science Mimicking Nature	Dee Pignéguy		Papawai Press
2010	Non-Fiction	Dear Alison: A New Zealand Soldier’s Story from Stalag 383	Simon Pollard		Penguin New Zealand
2010	Non-Fiction	Wearing the Poppy	AJ Toledo		HarperCollins New Zealand
2011	Picture Books	Hetty’s Day Out	Pamela Allen		Penguin / Viking
2011	Picture Books	Ria the Reckless Wrybill	Jane Buxton	Jenny Cooper	Puffin
2011	Picture Books	A Dog Like That!	Janene Cooper	Evie Kemp	Duck Creek Press
2011	Picture Books	The Rain Train	Elena de Roo	Brian Lovelock	Walker Books Australia
2011	Picture Books	The Moon and Farmer McPhee	Margaret Mahy	David Elliot	Random House
2011	Picture Books	Hill and Hole	Kyle Mewburn	Vasanti Unka	Puffin
2011	Picture Books	Quaky Cat	Diana Noonan	Gavin Bishop	Scholastic
2011	Picture Books	Two Little Pirates	Ruth Paul		Scholastic
2011	Picture Books	Magpie Mischief	June Peka	Jo Thapa	Scholastic
2011	Picture Books	The Mountain Who Wanted to Live in a House	Maurice Shadbolt	Renee Haggo	Duck Creek Press
2011	Junior Fiction	Jonty and Choc	Vince Ford		Scholastic
2011	Junior Fiction	Hollie Chips	Anna Gowan		Scholastic
2011	Junior Fiction	The Crocodile Nest	Des Hunt		HarperCollins
2011	Junior Fiction	Finnigan and the Pirates	Sherryl Jordan		Scholastic
2011	Junior Fiction	Viola Vincent Reporting	Anna Kenna		Scholastic
2011	Junior Fiction	The Haystack	Jack Lasenby		HarperCollins
2011	Junior Fiction	Staying Home: My True Diary of Survival	Jess O. (O’Connor)		Puffin
2011	Junior Fiction	The Sheep on the Fourth Floor	Leonie Thorpe		HarperCollins
2011	Junior Fiction	A Girl Called Harry	Philippa Werry		Scholastic
2011	Junior Fiction	This Way Up	Lindsay Wood		HarperCollins
2011	Young Adult Fiction	Fierce September	Fleur Beale		Random House
2011	Young Adult Fiction	Dreams of Warriors	Susan Brocker		HarperCollins
2011	Young Adult Fiction	Smiling Jack	Ken Catran		HarperCollins
2011	Young Adult Fiction	The Project	Brian Falkner		Walker Books Australia
2011	Young Adult Fiction	The Limping Man	Maurice Gee		Puffin
2011	Young Adult Fiction	Into the Wilderness	Mandy Hager		Random House
2011	Young Adult Fiction	Ebony Hill	Anna Mackenzie		Longacre / Random House
2011	Young Adult Fiction	Organ Music	Margaret Mahy		Gecko Press
2011	Young Adult Fiction	Tussock	Elizabeth Pulford		Walker Books Australia
2011	Young Adult Fiction	Bloodlines	T. K.		Penguin
2011	Non-Fiction	Brave Bess and the Anzac Horses	Susan Brocker		HarperCollins
2011	Non-Fiction	The Life Cycle of the Pukeko	Betty Brownlie		Scholastic
2011	Non-Fiction	The Kiwi Fossil Hunter’s Handbook	James Crampton	Marianna Terezow	Random House
2011	Non-Fiction	Zero Hour: The Anzacs on the Western Front	Leon Davidson		The Text Publishing Company
2011	Non-Fiction	Who’s Cooking Tonight?	Claire Gourley		Penguin
2011	Non-Fiction	Naughty Kid’s Book of Nature	Des Hunt	Scott Tulloch	HarperCollins
2011	Non-Fiction	Who You Are is What you Do: Making Choices about Life after School	Heather McAllister		Beatnik
2011	Non-Fiction	Sensational Survivors: An Illustrated Guide to New Zealand’s Remarkable Wildlife	Sandra Morris		Walker Books Australia
2011	Non-Fiction	Star Boy and Friends: How to Make Cool Stuff from Socks and Gloves and Weird Wabbit and Friends: How to Make Cool Stuff from Felt	Vasanti Unka		Penguin
2012	Picture Books	Nana’s Colours	Pamela Allen		Penguin
2012	Picture Books	Whetu: The Little Blue Duck	Jennifer Beck	Renee Haggo	David Ling
2012	Picture Books	Bruiser	Gavin Bishop		Random House
2012	Picture Books	Out of Bed, Fred!	Lucy Davey	Harriet Bailey	Scholastic
2012	Picture Books	Phoebe and the Night Creatures	Jenny Hessell	Donovan Bixley	Scholastic
2012	Picture Books	Tom and the Dragon	Juliette MacIver	Scott Tulloch	Scholastic
2012	Picture Books	Hester and Lester	Kyle Mewburn	Harriet Bailey	Random House
2012	Picture Books	Stomp! A Dinosaur Follow-the-Leader Story	Ruth Paul		Scholastic
2012	Picture Books	Rāhui	Chris Szekely	Malcolm Ross	Huia
2012	Picture Books	Lest We Forget	Feana Tu’akoi	Elspeth Alix Batt	Scholastic
2012	Junior Fiction	Super Finn	Leonie Agnew		Scholastic
2012	Junior Fiction	Just Jack	Adele Broadbent		HarperCollins
2012	Junior Fiction	The Travelling Restaurant	Barbara Else		Gecko Press
2012	Junior Fiction	At the Lake	Jill Harris		HarperCollins
2012	Junior Fiction	The Peco Incident	Des Hunt		HarperCollins
2012	Junior Fiction	The Flytrap Snaps	Johanna Knox	Sabrina Malcolm	Hinterlands
2012	Junior Fiction	Nest of Lies	Heather McQuillan		Scholastic
2012	Junior Fiction	The Loblolly Boy and the Sorcerer	James Norcliffe		Random House
2012	Young Adult Fiction	Dirt Bomb	Fleur Beale		Random House
2012	Young Adult Fiction	Yes	Deborah Burnside		HarperCollins
2012	Young Adult Fiction	The Bridge	Jane Higgins		Text Publishing Company
2012	Young Adult Fiction	Finder’s Shore	Anna Mackenzie		Random House
2012	Young Adult Fiction	Sacrifice	Joanna Orwin		HarperCollins
2012	Young Adult Fiction	Shaolin Burning	Ant Sang		HarperCollins
2012	Non-Fiction	When Gulls Fly High	Peter Bland	Joanna Bland	Penguin
2012	Non-Fiction	Our Children Aotearoa: O Tatou Tamariki	Sue Copsey		Pearson Education
2012	Non-Fiction	Nice Day for a War: Adventures of a Kiwi Soldier in World War I	Matt Elliott	Chris Slane	HarperCollins
2012	Non-Fiction	The Call of the Kokako	Maria Gill	Heather Arnold	New Holland
2012	Non-Fiction	New Zealand Hall of Fame: 50 Remarkable Kiwis	Maria Gill	Bruce Potter	New Holland
2012	Non-Fiction	Yates Young Gardener: Get Your Hands Dirty	Janice Marriott		HarperCollins
2012	Non-Fiction	Digging Up the Past: Archaeology for the Young and Curious	David Veart		Auckland University Press
2012	Non-Fiction	The Taniwha of Wellington Harbour	Moira Wairama	Bruce Potter	Penguin
2012	Non-Fiction	Party Food for Girls	Allesandra Zecchini and Arantxa Zecchini-Dowling	Shaun Cato-Symonds	New Holland
2012	Non-Fiction	I Spy NZ Art: New Zealand Art from the Collection of Auckland Art Gallery			Auckland Art Gallery
2013	Picture Books	Manukura: The White Kiwi	Joy Cowley	Bruce Potter	Random House
2013	Picture Books	Slinky Malinki, Early Bird	Lynley Dodd		Penguin
2013	Picture Books	Le Quesnoy: The Story of the Town New Zealand Saved	Glyn Harper	Jenny Cooper	Penguin
2013	Picture Books	The Red Poppy	David Hill	Fifi Colston	Scholastic
2013	Picture Books	Colour the Stars	Dawn McMillan	Keinyo White	Scholastic
2013	Picture Books	Mister Whistler	Margaret Mahy	Gavin Bishop	Gecko Press
2013	Picture Books	A Great Cake	Tina Matthews		Walker Books
2013	Picture Books	Melu	Kyle Mewburn	Ali Teo, John O'Reilly	Scholastic
2013	Picture Books	Demolition	Sally Sutton	Brian Lovelock	Walker Books
2013	Picture Books	Farmer John's Tractor	Sally Sutton	Robyn Belton	Walker Books
2013	Junior Fiction	The Drover's Quest	Susan Brocker		HarperCollins
2013	Junior Fiction	Dead Harry	Ken Catran		Scholastic
2013	Junior Fiction	When Empire Calls	Ken Catran		Scholastic
2013	Junior Fiction	The ACB with Honora Lee	Kate De Goldi	Gregory O'Brien	Random House
2013	Junior Fiction	The Queen and the Nobody Boy	Barbara Else	Sam Broad	Gecko Press
2013	Junior Fiction	Maddy West and the Tongue Taker	Brian Falkner	Donovan Bixley	Walker Books
2013	Junior Fiction	Telling Lies	Tricia Glensor		HarperCollins
2013	Junior Fiction	Red Rocks	Rachael King		Random House
2013	Junior Fiction	The Mysterious Magical Shop	Elizabeth Pulford	Rachel Driscoll	Scholastic
2013	Junior Fiction	Iris’s Ukulele	Kathy Taylor		Scholastic
2013	Young Adult Fiction	The Boy in the Olive Grove	Fleur Beale		Random House
2013	Young Adult Fiction	Trapped Outside a Cage	Ken Benn		Penguin
2013	Young Adult Fiction	Earth Dragon, Fire Hare	Ken Catran		HarperCollins
2013	Young Adult Fiction	The Nature of Ash	Mandy Hager		Random House
2013	Young Adult Fiction	My Brother’s War	David Hill		Penguin
2013	Young Adult Fiction	Ransomwood	Sherryl Jordan		Scholastic
2013	Young Adult Fiction	How to Sell Toothpaste	Leonie Thorpe		HarperCollins
2013	Non-Fiction	100 Amazing Tales from Aotearoa			Te Papa Press
2013	Non-Fiction	Taketakerau: The Millennium Tree	Marnie Anstis	Patricia Howitt, Kelly Spencer	Steele Roberts
2013	Non-Fiction	Sirocco: The Rock Star Kakapo	Sarah Ell		Random House
2013	Non-Fiction	Kiwi: The Real Story	Annemarie Florian	Heather Hunt	New Holland
2013	Non-Fiction	Eruption! Discovering New Zealand Volcanoes	Maria Gill		New Holland
2013	Non-Fiction	How Do You Say 'Thank You’?	Karamia Muller	Mark Paterson	Beatnik Publishing
2014	Picture Books	A Book is a Book	Jenny Bornholdt	Sarah Wilkins	Gecko Press and Whitireia Publishing
2014	Picture Books	Alphabet Squabble	Isaac Drought	Jenny Cooper	Scholastic
2014	Picture Books	Bad Dog Flash	Ruth Paul		Scholastic
2014	Picture Books	Henry's Map	David Elliot		Random House
2014	Picture Books	Swim - the Story of Hinemoa & Tutanekai and its te reo Māori retelling	Chris Szekely	Andrew Burdan	Huia
2014	Picture Books	Teddy Bear's Promise	Diana Noonan	Robyn Belton	Craig Potton Publishing
2014	Picture Books	The Boring Book	Vasanti Unka		Penguin
2014	Picture Books	The Boy and the Cherry Tree	Mark and Rowan Sommerset		Dreamboat
2014	Picture Books	The Quiet Pirate	Stephanie Thatcher		Duck Creek Press
2014	Picture Books	The Three Bears … Sort of	Yvonne Morrison	Donovan Bixley	Scholastic
2014	Picture Books	The Weather Machine	Donovan Bixley		Hachette
2014	Picture Books	Toucan Can	Juliette MacIver	Sarah Davis	Gecko Press
2014	Picture Books	While You are Sleeping	Melinda Szymanik	Greg Straight	Duck Creek Press
2014	Junior Fiction	A Winter's Day in 1939	Melinda Szymanik		Scholastic
2014	Junior Fiction	Dunger	Joy Cowley		Gecko Press
2014	Junior Fiction	Felix and the Red Rats	James Norcliffe		Random House
2014	Junior Fiction	New Zealand Girl: Rebecca and the Queen of Nations	Deborah Burnside		Penguin
2014	Junior Fiction	New Zealand Story: Lighthouse Family	Philippa Werry		Scholastic
2014	Junior Fiction	Project Huia	Des Hunt		Scholastic
2014	Junior Fiction	Scrap: Tale of a Blond Puppy	Vince Ford		Scholastic
2014	Junior Fiction	Shot Boom Score	Justin Brown		Allen & Unwin
2014	Junior Fiction	Sinking	David Hill		Scholastic
2014	Junior Fiction	The Phantom of Terawhiti	Des Hunt		HarperCollins
2014	Junior Fiction	The Princess and the Foal	Stacy Gregg		HarperCollins
2014	Junior Fiction	Where the Flag Floats	Dawn Grant		Standfast Publications
2014	Young Adult Fiction	A Necklace of Souls	R.L. Stedman		HarperCollins
2014	Young Adult Fiction	Birthright	Tania Roxborogh		Penguin
2014	Young Adult Fiction	Bugs	Whiti Hereaka		Huia
2014	Young Adult Fiction	Cattra's Legacy	Anna Mackenzie		Random House
2014	Young Adult Fiction	Dear Vincent	Mandy Hager		Random House
2014	Young Adult Fiction	Mortal Fire	Elizabeth Knox		Gecko Press
2014	Young Adult Fiction	Murder at Mykenai	Catherine Mayo		Walker Books
2014	Young Adult Fiction	Recon Team Angel: Ice War	Brian Falkner		Walker Books
2014	Young Adult Fiction	Speed Freak	Fleur Beale		Random House
2014	Young Adult Fiction	The Freedom Merchants	Sherryl Jordan		Scholastic
2014	Young Adult Fiction	When We Wake	Karen Healey		Allen & Unwin
2014	Non-Fiction	An Extraordinary Land	Peter Hayden and Rod Morris		HarperCollins
2014	Non-Fiction	Anzac Day: The New Zealand Story	Philippa Werry		New Holland
2014	Non-Fiction	First Crossings	Kevin Biggar and Jamie Fitzgerald		Random House
2014	Non-Fiction	In the Garden: Explore and Discover the New Zealand Backyard	Gillian Candler	Ned Barraud	Craig Potton
2014	Non-Fiction	Native Storybooks: Flight of the Honey Bee	Raymond Huber	Brian Lovelock	Walker Books
2014	Non-Fiction	Nic's Lunchbox	Nicholas Brockelbank		Scholastic
2014	Non-Fiction	Quarantine Inspected	Jaimie Baird		Primedia
2014	Non-Fiction	Running the Country: A Look inside New Zealand's Government	Maria Gill		New Holland
2014	Non-Fiction	The Beginner's Guide to Hunting and Fishing in New Zealand	Paul Adamson		Random House
2014	Non-Fiction	Wearable Wonders	Fifi Colston		Scholastic
2015	Picture Books	Blackie the Fisher Cat	Janet Pereira	Gabriella Klepatski	Craig Potton Publishing
2015	Picture Books	Have You Seen a Monster?	Raymond McGrath		Penguin
2015	Picture Books	Jim’s Letters	Glyn Harper	Jenny Cooper	Penguin
2015	Picture Books	Kakapo Dance	Helen Taylor		Penguin
2015	Picture Books	I Am Not A Worm	Scott Tulloch		Scholastic
2015	Picture Books	The Song of Kauri	Melinda Szymanik	Dominique Ford	Scholastic
2015	Picture Books	The Anzac Puppy	Peter Millett	Trish Bowles	Scholastic
2015	Picture Books	My New Zealand ABC Book	James Brown		Te Papa Tongarewa, Museum of NZ
2015	Picture Books	My New Zealand Colours Book	James Brown		Te Papa Tongarewa, Museum of NZ
2015	Picture Books	Construction	Sally Sutton	Brian Lovelock	Walker Books
2015	Junior Fiction	The Volume of Possible Endings	Barbara Else		Gecko Press
2015	Junior Fiction	Island of Lost Horses	Stacy Gregg		HarperCollins
2015	Junior Fiction	Conrad Cooper’s Last Stand	Leonie Agnew		Penguin
2015	Junior Fiction	Teddy One Eye: The Autobiography of a Teddy Bear	Gavin Bishop		Random House
2015	Junior Fiction	Harbour Bridge	Philippa Werry		Scholastic; My New Zealand Story
2015	Junior Fiction	Monkey Boy	Donovan Bixley		Scholastic
2015	Junior Fiction	Trouble in Time	Adele Broadbent		Scholastic
2015	Junior Fiction	The Name at the End of the Ladder	Elena de Roo		Walker Books
2015	Junior Fiction	Ophelia Wild, Deadly Detective	Elena de Roo		Walker Books
2015	Young Adult Fiction	While We Run	Karen Healey		Allen & Unwin
2015	Young Adult Fiction	Speed of Light	Joy Cowley		Gecko Press
2015	Young Adult Fiction	I am Rebecca	Fleur Beale		Random House
2015	Young Adult Fiction	Singing Home The Whale	Mandy Hager		Random House
2015	Young Adult Fiction	Spark	Rachael Craw		Walker Books
2015	Non-Fiction	A Little ABC Book	Jenny Palmer		Beatnik Publishing
2015	Non-Fiction	Maori Art for Kids	Julie Noanoa	Norm Heke	Craig Potton Publishing
2015	Non-Fiction	Under the Ocean: Explore and Discover New Zealand’s Sealife	Gillian Candler	Ned Barraud	Craig Potton Publishing
2015	Non-Fiction	The Book of Hat	Harriet Rowland		Makaro Press
2015	Non-Fiction	New Zealand Sports Hall of Fame: 25 Kiwi Champions	Maria Gill	Marco Ivancic	New Holland Publishers
2015	Non-Fiction	A Treasury of New Zealand Poems for Children edited	Paula Green	Jenny Cooper	Random House
2015	Non-Fiction	Ghoulish Get-Ups	Fifi Colston		Scholastic
2015	Non-Fiction	The Letterbox Cat and Other Poems	Paula Green	Myles Lawford	Scholastic
2015	Non-Fiction	Piggy Pasta and More Food with Attitude	Rebecca Woolfall and Suzi Tait-Bradly		Scholastic
2015	Non-Fiction	A New Zealand Nature Journal	Sandra Morris		Walker Books
2016	Picture Books	Muddle & Mo	Nikki Slade Robinson		Duck Creek
2016	Picture Books	Roly the Anzac Donkey	Glyn Harper	Jenny Cooper	Penguin Random/Puffin
2016	Picture Books	Henry's Stars written and illustrated	David Elliot		Penguin Random/Random
2016	Picture Books	Stripes! No, Spots!	Vasanti Unka		Penguin Random/Puffin
2016	Picture Books	First to the Top	David Hill	Phoebe Morris	Penguin Random/Puffin
2016	Picture Books	Yak and Gnu	Juliette MacIver	Cat Chapman	Walker
2016	Picture Books	Finding Monkey Moon	Elizabeth Pulford	Kate Wilkinson	Walker
2016	Picture Books	Hush: A Kiwi Lullaby	Joy Cowley	Andrew Burdan	Scholastic
2016	Picture Books	Changing Times: The Story of a New Zealand Town and its Newspaper	Bob Kerr	Bob Kerr	Potton & Burton
2016	Picture Books	Haka	Patricia Grace	Andrew Burdan	Huia
2016	Junior Fiction	The Bold Ship Phenomenal	Sarah Johnson		Flat Bed
2016	Junior Fiction	The Ghosts of Tarawera	Sue Copsey		Sue Copsey
2016	Junior Fiction	The Pirates and the Nightmaker	James Norcliffe		Penguin Random/ Longacre
2016	Junior Fiction	From the Cutting Room of Barney Kettle	Kate De Goldi		Penguin Random/ Longacre
2016	Junior Fiction	The Knot Impossible (A Tale of Fontana)	Barbara Else		Gecko
2016	Junior Fiction	The Bakehouse	Joy Cowley		Gecko
2016	Junior Fiction	The Girl Who Rode the Wind	Stacy Gregg		HarperCollins
2016	Junior Fiction	How I Alienated my Grandma	Suzanne Main		Scholastic
2016	Junior Fiction	Cool Nukes	Des Hunt		Scholastic
2016	Junior Fiction	Lily Max – Satin, Scissors, Frock	Jane Bloomfield		Luncheon Sausage
2016	Young Adult Fiction	Evie's War	Anna Mackenzie		Penguin Random/ Longacre
2016	Young Adult Fiction	Being Magdalene	Fleur Beale		Penguin Random/ Longacre
2016	Young Adult Fiction	Hucking Cody	Aaron Topp		Mary Egan
2016	Young Adult Fiction	The Heading Dog Who Split in Half	Michael Brown		Potton & Burton
2016	Non-Fiction	Jammin' with Steven Adams	David Riley		Reading Warrior
2016	Non-Fiction	Exploring Nature's Pattern Magic	Dee Pigneguy		Mary Egan
2016	Non-Fiction	Samoan Heroes	David Riley	Michel Mulipola	Reading Warrior
2016	Non-Fiction	Beginner's Guide to Rugby	Aaron Cruden		Penguin Random/ Longacre
2016	Non-Fiction	Beginner's Guide to Adventure Sport	Steve Gurney		Penguin Random/ Longacre
2016	Non-Fiction	Whose Beak is This?	Gillian Candler	Fraser Williamson	Potton & Burton
2016	Non-Fiction	Waitangi Day: The New Zealand Story	Philippa Werry		New Holland
2017	Picture Books	If I was a Banana	Alexandra Tylee	Kieran Rynhart	Gecko
2017	Picture Books	Gwendolyn!	Juliette MacIver	Terri Rose Baynton	HarperCollins
2017	Picture Books	Tuna and Hiriwa	Ripeka Takotowai Goddard	Kimberly Andrews	Huia
2017	Picture Books	Maui – Sun Catcher	Tim Tipene	Zak Waipara	Oratia
2017	Picture Books	Gladys Goes to War	Glyn Harper	Jenny Cooper	Penguin Random House NZ
2017	Picture Books	Fuzzy Doodle	Melinda Szymanik	Donovan Bixley	Scholastic NZ
2017	Picture Books	Gorillas in our Midst	Richard Fairgray	Terry Jones	Scholastic NZ
2017	Picture Books	Henry Bob Bobbalich	Juliette MacIver	Link Choi	Scholastic NZ
2017	Picture Books	Witch’s Cat Wanted Apply Within	Joy H Davidson	Nikki Slade-Robinson	Scholastic NZ
2017	Picture Books	The Harmonica	Dawn McMillan	Andrew Burdan	Scholastic NZ
2017	Picture Books	Rasmas	Elizabeth Pulford	Jenny Cooper	Scholastic NZ
2017	Picture Books	The Best Dad in the World	Pat Chapman	Cat Chapman	Upstart
2017	Junior Fiction	The Road to Ratenburg	Joy Cowley	Gavin Bishop	Gecko
2017	Junior Fiction	Annual edited	Kate De Goldi and Susan Paris		Gecko
2017	Junior Fiction	The Diamond Horse	Stacy Gregg		HarperCollins UK
2017	Junior Fiction	Rona	Chris Szekely	Josh Morgan	Huia
2017	Junior Fiction	Enemy Camp	David Hill		Penguin Random House NZ
2017	Junior Fiction	The Impossible Boy	Leonie Agnew		Penguin Random House NZ
2017	Junior Fiction	Grandad’s Wheelies	Jack Lasenby	Bob Kerr	Penguin Random House NZ
2017	Junior Fiction	Barking Mad	Tom E Moffatt		Scholastic NZ
2017	Junior Fiction	Sunken Forest	Des Hunt		Scholastic NZ
2017	Young Adult Fiction	Lonesome When You Go	Saradha Koirala		Makaro
2017	Young Adult Fiction	Coming Home to Roost	Mary-anne Scott		Penguin Random House NZ
2017	Non-Fiction	See Play Do: A Kid’s Handbook for Everyday Creative Fun	Louise Cuckow	Louise Cuckow	Beatnik
2017	Non-Fiction	Bruce Wants to Go Faster	Dreydon Sobanja	Murray Dewhurst	Inspired Kids
2017	Non-Fiction	Armistice Day: the New Zealand Story	Philippa Werry		New Holland
2017	Non-Fiction	Speed King: Burt Munro, the World’s Fastest Indian	David Hill	Phoebe Morris	Penguin Random House NZ
2017	Non-Fiction	Jack and Charlie: Boys of the Bush	Jack Marcotte		Penguin Random House NZ
2017	Non-Fiction	The Beginner's Guide to Netball	Maria Tutaia		Penguin Random House NZ
2017	Non-Fiction	Cricket with Kane Williamson	Kane Williamson		Penguin Random House NZ
2017	Non-Fiction	The Cuckoo and the Warbler: A True New Zealand Story	Kennedy Warne	Heather Hunt	Potton and Burton
2017	Non-Fiction	ANZAC Heroes	Maria Gill	Marco Ivancic	Scholastic NZ
2017	Non-Fiction	Much ado about Shakespeare	Donovan Bixley	Donovan Bixley	Upstart
2018	Picture Books	What Are You Supposed to be?	Paul Beavis		Scholastic NZ
2018	Picture Books	Torty and the Soldier	Jennifer Beck	Fifi Colston	Scholastic NZ
2018	Picture Books	The Longest Breakfast	Jenny Bornholdt	Sarah Wilkins	Gecko Press
2018	Picture Books	Ngā Tae / Colours	Kitty Brown	Kirsten Parkinson	Reo Pēpi
2018	Picture Books	Scarface Claw, Hold Tight!	Lynley Dodd		Penguin Random House
2018	Picture Books	That’s Not the Monster We Ordered	Richard Fairgray	Terry Jones	Penguin Random House
2018	Picture Books	If I had an Elephant	Richard Fairgray	Terry Jones	Scholastic NZ
2018	Picture Books	The Curious Ar-Chew	Sarah Grundy	Ali Teo, John O’Reilly	Scholastic NZ
2018	Picture Books	Inspector Brunswick: The Case of the Missing Eyebrow	Chris Lam Sam	Angela Keoghan	Tate Publishing
2018	Picture Books	Ambulance, Ambulance!	Sally Sutton	Brian Lovelock	Walker Books Australia
2018	Picture Books	It's My Egg (and You Can’t Have It)	Kennedy Warne	Heather Hunt	Potton & Burton
2018	Junior Fiction	Flying Furballs: Most Wanted	Donovan Bixley		Upstart Press
2018	Junior Fiction	Flying Furballs: Unmasked	Donovan Bixley		Upstart Press
2018	Junior Fiction	Helper and Helper	Joy Cowley	Gavin Bishop	Gecko Press
2018	Junior Fiction	The Thunderbolt Pony	Stacy Gregg		HarperCollins
2018	Junior Fiction	The Spaghetti Giraffe	Sarah Johnson	Deborah Hinde	Flat Bed Press
2018	Junior Fiction	How Not to Stop a Kidnap Plot	Suzanne Main		Scholastic NZ
2018	Junior Fiction	My New Zealand Story: Bastion Point	Tania Roxborogh		Scholastic NZ
2018	Junior Fiction	Awatea’s Treasure	Fraser Smith		Huia Publishers
2018	Junior Fiction	Miniwings #1: Glitterwing’s Book Week Blunder	Sally Sutton	Kirsten Richards	Scholastic NZ
2018	Young Adult Fiction	The Severed Land	Maurice Gee		Penguin Random House
2018	Young Adult Fiction	Flight Path	David Hill		Penguin Random House
2018	Young Adult Fiction	Zeustian Logic	Sabrina Malcolm		Gecko Press
2018	Young Adult Fiction	Pieces of You	Eileen Merriman		Penguin Random House
2018	Young Adult Fiction	The Traitor and the Thief	Gareth Ward		Walker Books Australia
2018	Non-Fiction	New Zealand’s Great White Sharks: How science is revealing their secrets	Alison Ballance		Potton & Burton
2018	Non-Fiction	Aotearoa: The New Zealand Story	Gavin Bishop		Penguin Random House
2018	Non-Fiction	Whose Feet are These?	Gillian Candler	Fraser Williamson	Potton & Burton
2018	Non-Fiction	Collins Field Guide to the New Zealand Seashore	Sally Carson	Rod Morris	HarperCollins
2018	Non-Fiction	Abel Tasman: Mapping the Southern Lands	Maria Gill	Marco Ivancic	Scholastic NZ
2018	Non-Fiction	Toroa's Journey	Maria Gill	Gavin Mouldey	Potton & Burton
2018	Non-Fiction	Sky High: Jean Batten’s Incredible Flying Adventures	David Hill	Phoebe Morris	Penguin Random House
2018	Non-Fiction	How to Mend a Kea + Other Fabulous Fix-it Tales from Wildbase Hospital	Janet Hunt		Massey University Press
2018	Non-Fiction	Nature Storybooks: Gecko	Raymond Huber	Brian Lovelock	Walker Books Australia
2018	Non-Fiction	Cook Islands Heroes	David Riley	Michel Mulipola	Reading Warrior
2018	Non-Fiction	Explore! Aotearoa	Bronwen Wall	Kimberly Andrews	Kennett Brothers
2019	Picture Books	Mini Whinny: Happy Birthday to Me	Stacy Gregg	Ruth Paul	Scholastic NZ
2019	Picture Books	Oink	David Elliot		Gecko Press
2019	Picture Books	Dig, Dump, Roll	Sally Sutton	Brian Lovelock	Walker Books Australia
2019	Picture Books	How Māui fished up the North Island	Donovan Bixley		Upstart Press
2019	Picture Books	I am Jellyfish	Ruth Paul		Penguin Random House
2019	Picture Books	Granny McFlitter, the Champion Knitter	Heather Haylock	Lael Chisholm	Penguin Random House
2019	Picture Books	Puffin the Architect	Kimberly Andrews		Penguin Random House
2019	Picture Books	Muddle & Mo’s Rainy Day	Nikki Slade Robinson		Duck Creek Press
2019	Picture Books	The Anzac Violin	Jennifer Beck	Robyn Belton	Scholastic NZ
2019	Picture Books	The Bomb	Sacha Cotter	Josh Morgan	Huia
2019	Junior Fiction	The Short but Brilliant Career of Lucas Weed	Steph Matuku	Katharine Hall	Huia
2019	Junior Fiction	Whetū Toa and the Magician	Eirlys Hunter	Kirsten Slade	Gecko Press
2019	Junior Fiction	The Mapmakers’ Race	Sherryl Jordan		One Tree House
2019	Junior Fiction	Rafferty Ferret: Ratbag	Stacy Gregg		HarperCollins
2019	Junior Fiction	The Fire Stallion	Liz van der Laase		One Tree House
2019	Junior Fiction	Cuz	Pauline (Vaeluaga) Smith		Scholastic NZ
2019	Junior Fiction	My New Zealand Story: Dawn Raid	Mary-anne Scott		One Tree House
2019	Junior Fiction	Sticking with Pigs	Fleur Beale		Allen & Unwin
2019	Junior Fiction	Lyla: Through My Eyes – Natural Disaster Zones	Des Hunt		Scholastic NZ
2019	Junior Fiction	Kiwis at War - 1918: Broken Poppies			
2019	Young Adult Fiction	Take Flight	J L Pawley		Eunoia
2019	Young Adult Fiction	Legacy	Whiti Hereaka		Huia
2019	Young Adult Fiction	Flight of the Fantail	Steph Matuku		Huia
2019	Young Adult Fiction	Ezaara: Riders of Fire, Book One	Eileen Mueller		Phantom Feather
2019	Young Adult Fiction	Dragon Hero: Riders of Fire, Book Two	Eileen Mueller		Phantom Feather
2019	Young Adult Fiction	Ash Arising	Mandy Hager		Penguin Random House
2019	Young Adult Fiction	The Anger of Angels	Sherryl Jordan		Walker Books Australia
2019	Young Adult Fiction	Catch Me When You Fall	Eileen Merriman		Penguin Random House
2019	Young Adult Fiction	The Rift	Rachael Craw		Walker Books Australia
2019	Non-Fiction	New Zealand’s Backyard Beasts	Ned Barraud		Potton & Burton
2019	Non-Fiction	Cook’s Cook: The Cook who Cooked for Captain Cook	Gavin Bishop		Gecko Press
2019	Non-Fiction	Go Girl: A Storybook of Epic NZ Women	Barbara Else		Penguin Random House
2019	Non-Fiction	Oh Boy: A Storybook of Epic NZ Men	Stuart Lipshaw		Penguin Random House
2019	Non-Fiction	Anzac Animals	Maria Gill	Marco Ivančić	Scholastic NZ
2019	Non-Fiction	ART-TASTIC	Sarah Pepperle		Christchurch Art Gallery Te Puna o Waiwhetū
2019	Non-Fiction	Why is that Lake so Blue? A Children's Guide to New Zealand's Natural World	Simon Pollard		Te Papa Press
2019	Non-Fiction	Mozart: The Man Behind the Music	Donovan Bixley		Upstart Press
2019	Non-Fiction	The New Zealand Wars	Philippa Werry		New Holland
2019	Non-Fiction	Pathway of the Birds, The Voyaging Achievements of Māori and their Polynesian Ancestors	Andrew Crowe		David Bateman
2019	Te Reo Māori	Pūrakāu o Aotearoa: Te Hīnga Ake a Māui i te Ika Whenua	Donovan Bixley, Darryn Joseph	Keri Opai	Upstart Press
2019	Te Reo Māori	Ngā Whetū Matariki i Whānakotia	Miriamo Kamo, Zak Waipara, Ngaere Roberts		Scholastic
2020	Picture Books	I Had a Brother	Diana Menefy	Malena Laugesen	One Tree House
2020	Picture Books	Song of the River	Joy Cowley	Kimberly Andrews	Gecko Press
2020	Picture Books	Granny McFlitter	Heather Haylock	Lael Chisholm	Penguin Random House
2020	Picture Books	The Little Ghost Who Lost Her Boo!	Elaine Bickell	Raymond McGrath	Scholastic NZ
2020	Picture Books	Things in the Sea are Touching Me!	Linda Jane Keegan	Minky Stapleton	Scholastic NZ
2020	Picture Books	The Gobbledegook Book	Joy Cowley	Giselle Clarkson	Gecko Press
2020	Picture Books	Mr Kiwi Has an Important Job	Heather Hunt		Potton & Burton
2020	Picture Books	Bess the Brave War Horse	Susan Brocker	Raymond McGrath	Scholastic NZ
2020	Junior Fiction	Prince of Ponies	Stacy Gregg		HarperCollins
2020	Junior Fiction	Avis and the Promise of Dragons	Heather McQuillan		The Cuba Press
2020	Junior Fiction	Tūi Street Heroes	Anne Kayes		Wildling Books
2020	Junior Fiction	#Tumeke!	Michael Petherick		Massey University Press
2020	Junior Fiction	Hazel and the Snails	Nan Blanchard	Giselle Clarkson	Massey University Press
2020	Junior Fiction	The Telegram	Philippa Werry		Pipi Press
2020	Junior Fiction	Bullseye Bella	James T Guthrie		Scholastic NZ
2020	Junior Fiction	Lizard's Tale	Weng Wai Chan		Text Publishing
2020	Junior Fiction	To Trap a Thief	Des Hunt		Scholastic NZ
2020	Young Adult Fiction	A Place of Stone and Darkness	Chris Mousdale		Penguin Random House
2020	Young Adult Fiction	Invisibly Breathing	Eileen Merriman		Penguin Random House
2020	Young Adult Fiction	Ursa	Tina Shaw		Walker Books Australia
2020	Young Adult Fiction	Wynter's Thief	Sherryl Jordan		One Tree House
2020	Young Adult Fiction	Afakasi Woman	Lani Wendt Young		One Tree House
2020	Non-Fiction	Dinosaur Hunter: Joan Wiffen's Awesome Fossil Discoveries	David Hill	Phoebe Morris	Penguin Random House
2020	Non-Fiction	Tohorā: The Southern Right Whale	Ned Barraud		Potton & Burton
2020	Non-Fiction	Wildlife of Aotearoa	Gavin Bishop		Penguin Random House
2020	Non-Fiction	Mophead: How your Difference Makes a Difference	Selina Tusitala Marsh		Auckland University Press
2020	Non-Fiction	Te Tiriti o Waitangi/The Treaty of Waitangi	Ross Calman and Mark Derby	Toby Morris	Lift Education
2020	Non-Fiction	Māui's Taonga Tales: A Treasury of Tales from the South Pacific	David Brechin-Smith and Ranea Aparehama		Te Papa Press
2020	Non-Fiction	The Adventures of Tupaia	Courtney Sina Meredith	Mat Tait	Allen & Unwin
2020	Non-Fiction	Three Kiwi Tales: More Fabulous Fix-it Stories from Wildbase Hospital	Janet Hunt		Massey University Press
2020	Non-Fiction	New Zealand Nature Heroes	Gillian Candler		Potton & Burton
2020	Non-Fiction	First Map: How James Cook Charted Aotearoa New Zealand	Tessa Duder	David Elliot	HarperCollins
2020	Te Reo Māori	Te Kī Taurangi a Puanga: He pūrākau Matariki	Kirsty Wadsworth	Munro Te Whata	Scholastic NZ
2020	Te Reo Māori	He Paki Taonga i a Māui: He putunga kōreo mai i Te Moana-nui-a-Kiwa	David Brechin-Smith and Ranea Aparehama		Te Papa Press

== See also ==
- List of New Zealand literary awards
