= Sandy McKay =

- Born: 25 August 1959 (age 67); Dunedin
- Occupation: Writer

Sandy McKay is a New Zealand children's writer, freelance author and adult literacy tutor. Several of her books have been shortlisted for or have won awards, including Recycled, which won the Junior Fiction section of the New Zealand Post Book Awards for Children and Young Adults in 2002. She lives in Dunedin, New Zealand.

== Biography ==
McKay was born on 25 August 1959 in Dunedin. After leaving school at 17, she worked for several years before attending the University of Otago and graduating with a BA in political studies. She has been a waitress, fruit picker, office worker and fruit shop owner, and began to write children's fiction after her own children were born. In 2002, she was the University of Otago College of Education / Creative New Zealand Children's Writer in Residence.

Several of her books have been shortlisted for the New Zealand Book Awards for Children and Young Adults or the Esther Glen Award, or named as Storylines Notable Books. Her stories have appeared in anthologies such as Stories for 7 year olds (Random House, 2014) and Stories for 6 year olds (Random House, 2014), and she has written feature articles for several magazines including Next, More, NZ Woman’s Weekly and Kiwi Parent. Recycled won the Junior Fiction category in the New Zealand Post Book Awards for Children and Young Adults in 2002.

She also works as an adult literacy tutor for Literacy Aotearoa and visits schools as part of the New Zealand Book Council Writers in Schools programme.

She is married with three children and lives in Dunedin.

== Bibliography ==
- Recycled (Longacre Press, 2001)
- My Dad, the All Black Longacre Press, 2002)
- Becky's Big Race (Wendy Pye Publishing, 2002)
- Colin Goes Bush (Longacre Press, 2003)
- Who Wants to Be a Millionaire? (Longacre Press, 2004)
- Barry & Bitsa illustrated by Anna Evans [Kiwi Bites] (Puffin, 2005)
- I'm Telling On You illustrated by Trevor Pye [Kiwi Bites] (Puffin, 2006)
- Losing It (Longacre Press, 2007)
- One Stroppy Jockey (Longacre Press, 2007)
- Me and Jason Ballinger illustrated by Fraser Williamson [Kiwi Bites] (Puffin, 2008)
- Eureka! (Mallinson Rendel, 2008)
- Spiders In My Stomach (Wendy Pye Publishing, 2008)
- My Tripp Smells a Rat illustrated by Ruth Paul (Walker Books, 2011)
- Mr Tripp Goes for a Skate illustrated by Ruth Paul (Walker Books, 2011)
- When Our Jack Went to War (Longacre Press, 2013)
- Charlotte and the Golden Promise (Penguin, 2014)
