= Juliette MacIver =

New Zealand children's writer

Juliette MacIver is a New Zealand children’s picture book writer. Her work has been widely reviewed and shortlisted for a number of awards, and her book That’s Not a Hippopotamus! won the picture book category of the 2017 New Zealand Book Awards for Children and Young Adults. She has four children and lives near Wellington, New Zealand.

== Biography ==
Juliette MacIver grew up in Wellington. She completed a Bachelor of Arts in linguistics at Victoria University of Wellington, and later a Diploma in Teaching English as a Second Language. Following her studies, she taught English, travelled around Thailand and Europe and worked in a government department.

She is married with four children and lives beside the sea near Wellington. She began writing after her third child was born and then found that writing picture books fitted in around looking after small children.

MacIver's books are notable for their use of clever rhyme and their sense of light-hearted fun. They are sold in New Zealand, Australia, Canada, the UK and the US and have been reviewed in the Wall Street Journal, New York Times and Boston Globe.

== Awards and prizes ==
Many of MacIver's picture books have won or been shortlisted for book awards or named as Storylines Notable Books. Marmaduke Duck and the Marmalade Jam was shortlisted for the Crystal Kite Award as well as the New Zealand Book Awards for Children and Young Adults in 2011. Children’s bookseller John McIntyre included it in his list of essential titles for a child’s first library.

Marmaduke Duck and Bernadette Bear was shortlisted for the LIANZA Book Awards in 2012. Toucan Can was shortlisted for the 2014 New Zealand Book Awards for Children and Young Adults. Gwendolyn! was shortlisted for the 2017 New Zealand Book Awards for Children and Young Adults.

That’s Not a Hippopotamus! won the picture book category of the 2017 New Zealand Book Awards for Children and Young Adults. Duck Goes Meow was shortlisted for the same award in 2023 and Beddy Bye Time in the Kōwhai Tree in 2025.

== Bibliography ==
- Marmaduke Duck and the Marmalade Jam illustrated by Sarah Davis (Scholastic, 2010)
- Tom and the Dragon ill. Scott Tulloch (Scholastic, 2011)
- Marmaduke Duck and Bernadette Bear ill. Sarah Davis (Scholastic, 2011)
- Little Witch ill. Cat Chapman (Walker Books Australia, 2013)
- Toucan Can ill. Sarah Davis (Gecko Press, 2013)
- Queen Alice’s Palaces ill. Lucia Masciullo (HarperCollins Australia, 2013)
- The Frog Who Lost His Underpants ill. Cat Chapman (Walker Books Australia, 2013)
- Marmaduke Duck on the Wide Blue Seas ill. Sarah Davis (Scholastic, 2014)
- The Moose and the Goose ill. Jenny Cooper (Scholastic, 2014)
- Bye! Bye! Bye! ill. Stephanie Junovich (Scholastic, 2014)
- Grasshoppers Dance ill. Nina Rycroft (Scholastic, 2015)
- Yak and Gnu ill. Cat Chapman (Walker Books, 2015)
- Marmaduke Duck and the Christmas Calamity ill. Sarah Davis (Scholastic, 2016)
- That’s Not a Hippopotamus! ill. Sarah Davis (Gecko Press, 2015)
- Gwendolyn! ill. Terri Rose Baynton (ABC Books, 2016)
- Henry Bob Bobbalich ill. Link Choi (Scholastic, 2016)
- We're Off to Find a Kiwi ill. Kate Wilkinson (Scholastic, 2017)
- A Mother's Day Dilemma ill. Janine Millington (Scholastic, 2017)
- The Grizzled Grist Does Not Exist ill. Sarah Davis (Gecko Press, 2022)
- Duck Goes Meow ill. Carla Martell (Scholastic, 2023)
- Faelan the Wolf: Odd Wolf Out (Faelan the Wolf Book 1; Scholastic, 2023)
- Faelan the Wolf: Into the Lockjaws (Faelan the Wolf Book 2; Scholastic, 2023)
- Beddy Bye Time in the Kōwhai Tree ill. Lily Uivel (Scholastic, 2024)
