= Gillian Candler =

New Zealand children's writer (born 1959)

Gillian Candler (born 1959) is a New Zealand writer, teacher, publisher and conservationist. Her children's non-fiction books about New Zealand nature have been widely reviewed and shortlisted for a number of awards.

== Biography ==
Although she was born in England in 1959, she spent her childhood in Wellington, New Zealand.

Several of Candler's books have been shortlisted for the New Zealand Book Awards for Children and Young Adults or named as Storylines Notable Books. Her book At the Beach illustrated by Ned Barraud won the Elsie Locke Award for Non-Fiction in 2013.

Candler collaborated with the New Zealand Mountain Safety Council to write the 2023 book Mia & Leo Go Wild, which was illustrated by Gavin Mouldey.

Candler currently lives in Pukerua Bay.
