= Mary-anne Scott =

New Zealand writer, singer and musician

- Occupation: Writer
- Website: maryannescott.com

Mary-anne Scott is a writer, singer and musician. Her books have been shortlisted for awards and Snakes and Ladders won the Children's Choice Award in the Young Adult category of the 2013 New Zealand Children's Book Awards. She lives in Havelock North, New Zealand, and has four sons and five grandchildren.

== Biography ==
Mary-anne Scott was one of nine children in a family where music played a large part. Each child was encouraged to learn two musical instruments (for Scott, these were the cello and guitar), and music practice times were strictly enforced. Scott's father composed songs for school musicals, for which her mother Joy Watson, herself a best-selling author of children's books, wrote the lyrics.

After years of writing short stories, Scott completed a creative writing course at Hawke's Bay's Eastern Institute of Technology. She gained an NZSA mentorship with author David Hill, going on to study the one-year Whitireia Polytechnic’s Diploma in Creative Writing course with tutor Mandy Hager in 2011. Scott has been a speaker at several literary festivals, including the Hawke's Bay Readers and Writers Festival in 2013 and Featherston Booktown in 2016, and she judged the Ronald Hugh Morrieson Literary Awards of 2018.

Scott and her husband Paul have four sons and two grandsons, and live in Havelock North, Hawke's Bay. As well as being a singer, Scott plays and teaches the guitar.

Scott's personal experience of raising boys, listening to them and their friends, and teaching cello and guitar to high school students has influenced and inspired her writing for young adults. It has also led her to write a newspaper column on parenting teenagers. The publisher of Coming Home to Roost commented on the authenticity of the dialogue and the teenager-parent relationships displayed in her writing, and noted the young adult novel as the first of its kind published in New Zealand to explore unplanned parenthood from the father's point of view.

== Awards and prizes ==
Snakes and Ladders won the Young Adult category of the Children's Choice Award in the 2013 New Zealand Children's Book Awards and was short-listed for the LIANZA awards. Coming Home to Roost was awarded a Storylines Notable Book Award in 2017 and was short-listed as a finalist for the New Zealand Book Awards for Children and Young Adults. Her work has also been short-listed for the National Flash Fiction Awards.

Sticking with Pigs was shortlisted in the Young Adult category of the 2018 New Zealand Book Awards for Children and Young Adults. The Mess of Our Lives was shortlisted for the same award in 2025.

== Bibliography ==
- Snakes and Ladders (Scholastic, 2012)
- Coming Home to Roost (Penguin Random House, 2016)
- Sticking with Pigs (OneTree House, 2018)
- Spearo (OneTree House, 2020)
- Fantastic Mr. Bean, illustrated by Lisa Allen (OneTree House, 2020)
- The Tomo (OneTree House, 2021)
- The Mess of Our Lives (OneTree House 2024)
