= Anna Mackenzie (writer) =

New Zealand writer

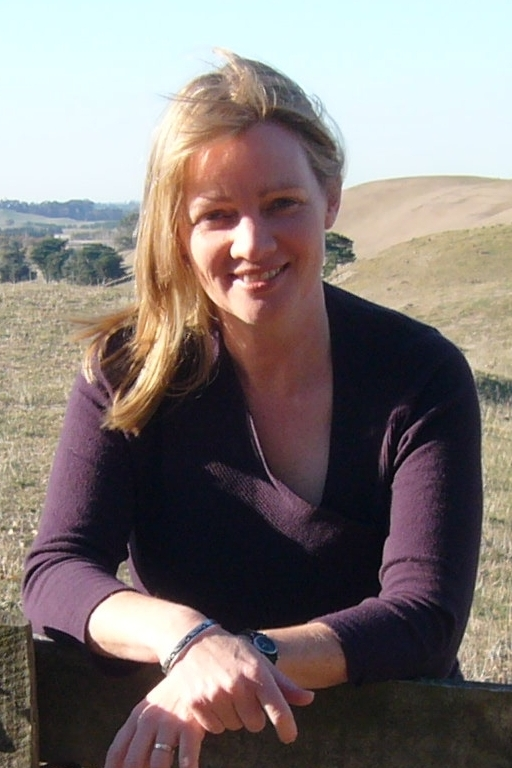
- Born: April 22, 1963 (age 63); Palmerston North, New Zealand
- Education: Victoria University of Wellington
- Occupation: Writer
- Writing career
- Genres: Historical fiction speculative fiction contemporary literature

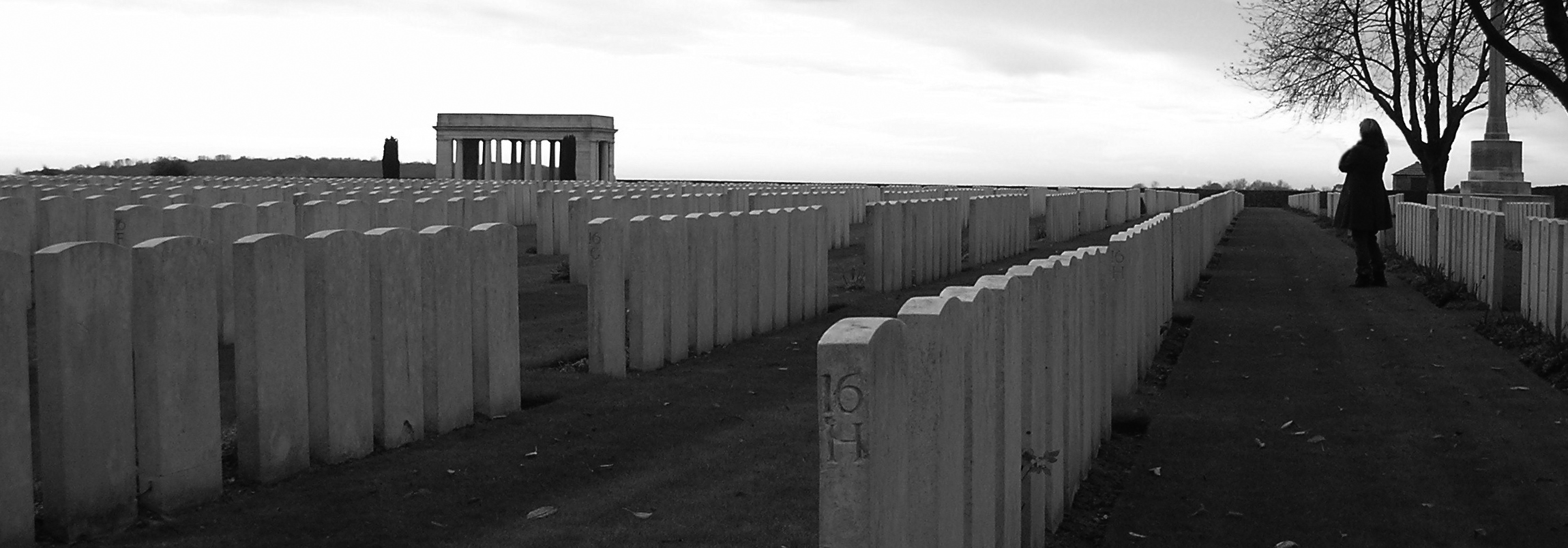
Anna Mackenzie, WWI research, Northern France

Anna Mackenzie (born 22 April 1963) is a New Zealand writer of contemporary, historic and speculative fiction for adult and young adult audiences. She has won numerous awards for her writing and also works as an editor, mentor, teacher of creative writing programmes and public speaker at festivals and in schools.

== Biography ==
Anna Mackenzie was born in Palmerston North, New Zealand, on 22 April 1963. She was a keen reader and wrote her first collection of stories aged 7. She started writing for children when running reading groups at her own children's school.

She has a degree in psychology and while studying at Victoria University in Wellington she helped to produce the university newspaper, Salient. Later, she worked in publishing and spent some time overseas in a variety of jobs ranging from nannying in London to hiring out fishing boats on the West Coast of Scotland.

Mackenzie now lives on a farm in Hawkes Bay. She has served as Vice-President of the New Zealand Society of Authors (NZSA) and Central Districts Regional Delegate. As well as writing, she edits magazines, mentors aspiring writers and teaches creative writing and speaks at schools and literary festivals. She has appeared at the Auckland Writers & Readers Festival in 2010, Writers Week at the New Zealand Festival in Wellington in 2016, the Hawke’s Bay Readers & Writers Festival in 2013 and 2018, and she was a speaker, panellist and Chair in several sessions of the NZSA National Writers Forum in 2018.

== Awards and residencies ==
Her nine novels have been recognised with an NZ Post Honour Award, Sir Julius Vogel Award, iBooks "Top Five" and Storylines Notable Book Awards. The Sea-wreck Stranger was awarded a prestigious White Raven Award for outstanding children's literature.

In 2013, she was awarded a writing residency in Belgium by Belgian arts organisation Passa Porta, and in 2014 she spoke at "This Way Up", the Australia and New Zealand Festival of Literature and Arts in London.

== Bibliography ==
- High Tide (Scholastic, 2003)
- Out on the Edge (Longacre, 2005)
- The Sea-wreck Stranger (Longacre, 2007)
- Shadow of the Mountain (Longacre, 2008)
- Ebony Hill (Random House/Longacre, 2010)
- Finder’s Shore (Random House/Longacre, 2012)
- Cattra’s Legacy (Random House, 2013)
- Donnel’s Promise (Random House, 2014)
- Evie’s War (Penguin Random House, 2015)
