= Des Hunt =

New Zealand teacher and writer

- Born: 29 December 1941 (age 84); Palmerston North, New Zealand
- Occupation: Writer
- Website: deshunt.com

Des Hunt (born 29 December 1941) is a New Zealand teacher and a writer for children and young adults. Several of his books have been shortlisted for or have won awards, including Cry of the Taniwha, which won the Gaelyn Gordon Award for a Much-Loved Book in 2016. He was also the recipient of the prestigious Margaret Mahy Award in 2017. He lives in Matarangi, Coromandel Peninsula.

== Biography ==
Des Hunt was born on 29 December 1941 in Palmerston North. As a child, he was fascinated by science which was his "favourite and best" subject at school. His favourite childhood book was The Lost World by Sir Arthur Conan Doyle and another influential author in his life was Howard Spring.

He was educated at Terrace End School, Palmerston North Intermediate, Palmerston North Boys' High School, Victoria University of Wellington and Christchurch College of Education.

Hunt was a teacher for over 42 years, beginning at Hawera High School. He taught chemistry, physics, electronics and computing, and also wrote science textbooks.

In 2007, he retired from teaching to devote himself to writing, but remains a frequent visitor to schools to talk about his books and often uses chemical reactions in his presentations as a way of explaining and illustrating the writing process. His love of the natural world is evident in his books which often deal with environmental issues and have strong conservation themes.

He is married with two adult children and lives at Matarangi, Coromandel Peninsula.

== Awards and prizes ==
A number of Hunt's books have been shortlisted for awards or named as Storylines Notable Books.

He was a finalist in the NZ Post Children's Book Awards 2003 (A Friend in Paradise), 2007 (Frog Whistle Mine), 2010 (Cry of the Taniwha) and 2014 (Project Huia). Cool Nukes was shortlisted in the Children's Choice category of the 2016, and he was finalist in the 2017 New Zealand Book Awards for Children and Young Adults with Sunken Forest. His book Cry of the Taniwha received the Gaelyn Gordon Award for a Much-Loved Book in 2016.

In 2017, Hunt was the recipient of the Storylines Margaret Mahy Medal and Lecture Award and delivered his lecture titled Stories Out Loud.

He has also received the Woolf Fisher Memorial Award for services to education and the New Zealand Institute of Physics Award.

His 2020 book, Red Edge, was shortlisted for the 2021 Young Readers prize at the Ngaio Marsh Awards.

== Bibliography ==
- A Friend in Paradise (HarperCollins, 2002)
- The Moa Cave (HarperCollins, 2005)
- Frog Whistle Mine (HarperCollins, 2006)
- Where Cuckoos Call (HarperCollins, 2007)
- Shadows in the Ice (HarperCollins, 2007)
- The Tooth (HarperCollins, 2008)
- Whale Pot Bay (HarperCollins, 2009)
- Cry of the Taniwha (HarperCollins, 2009)
- The Secret of Jelly Mountain (Scholastic, 2009) republished as The Last Tuatara
- The Crocodile Nest (HarperCollins, 2010)
- The Naughty Kid’s Book of Nature (HarperCollins, 2010)
- The Peco Incident (HarperCollins, 2011)
- Cody’s Unexpected Catch (HarperCollins, 2011)
- Steel Pelicans (HarperCollins, 2012)
- The Phantom of Terawhiti (HarperCollins, 2013)
- Project Huia (Scholastic, 2013)
- Crown Park (Oceanbooks, 2013)
- Cool Nukes (Scholastic, 2015)
- Skink Gully (Torea Press, 2015)
- Sunken Forest (Scholastic, 2016)
- Deadly Feathers (Torea Press, 2016)
- Broken Poppies (Scholastic, 2018; Kiwis at War)
- Search for a Kiwi Killer (Torea Press, 2018)
- To Trap a Thief (Scholastic, 2019)
- Red Edge (Scholastic, 2020)
