= Sue Copsey =

Writer (b. 1960)

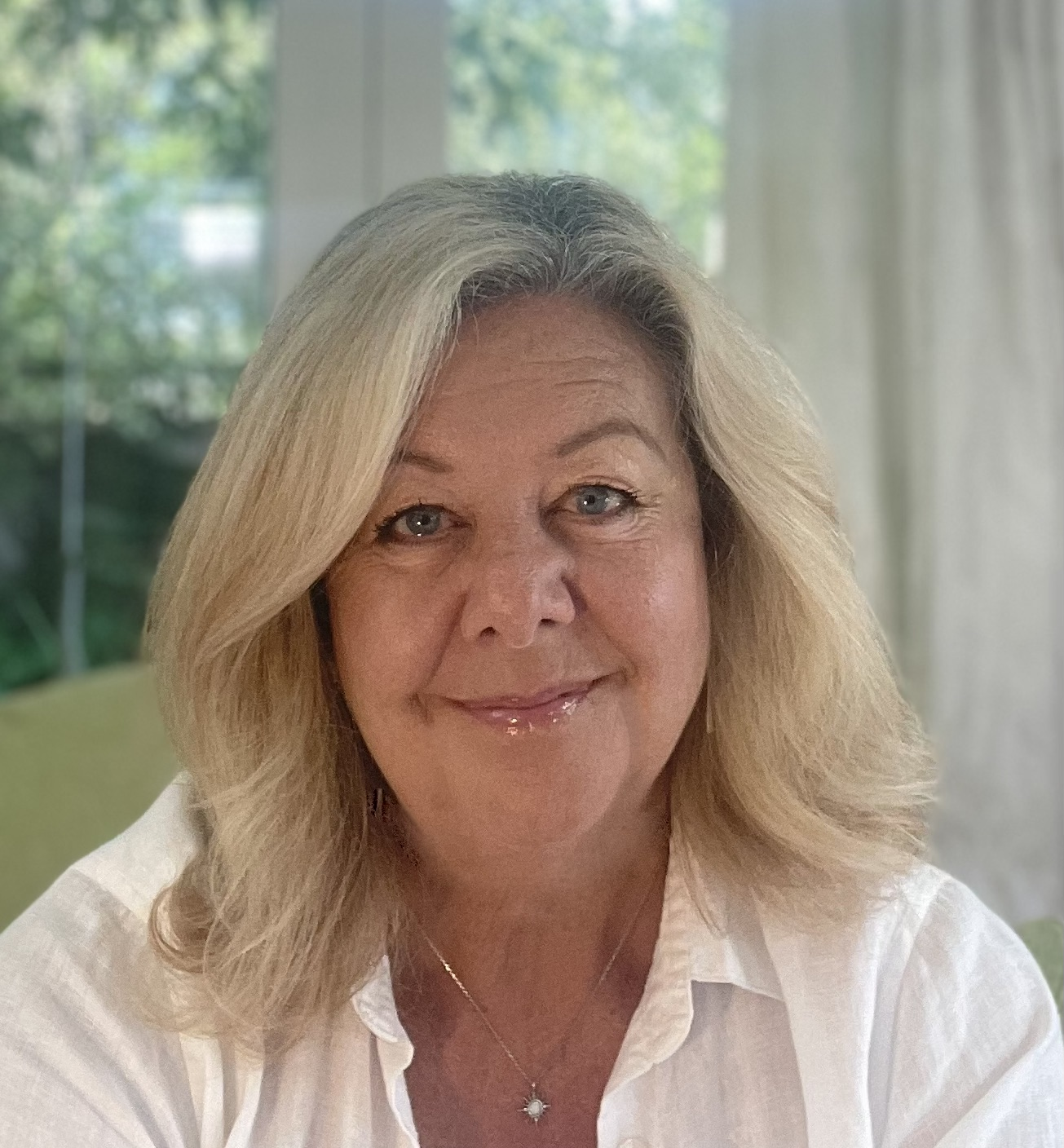
- Born: Coventry, England
- Occupation: Writer

Website
- suecopsey.com

Sue Copsey is a freelance writer and editor. Several of her books have been shortlisted for or won awards, including the Times Educational Supplement Best Children’s Non-fiction Book 1995. She lives in Brentwood, England and Auckland, New Zealand.

== Biography ==
Sue Copsey was born in Coventry, England and grew up in the town of Rugby. She worked as a press officer at London Zoo for several years before becoming a project editor, and then senior editor for Dorling Kindersley Children’s Books in London.

After moving to New Zealand in 1995, she worked as a freelance editor for various publishers including Pearson Education, New Holland and Huia Publishing. She is also a regular contributor to magazines including the New Zealand Listener and Royals Monthly.

One of her favourite books as a child was Folklore, Myths and Legends of Great Britain, which featured maps and photographs of haunted areas of Britain. At Hallowe’en, she and her friends would dare each other to walk through the local churchyard, where according to local legend, the mysterious Grey Lady haunted the gravestones. She was fascinated by tales of spooks and ghosts but also loved The Famous Five stories of Enid Blyton.

Her ongoing fascination with stories of history, adventure and mystery later resulted in her Spooky Adventure series of stories featuring ghosts, starting with The Ghosts of Young Nick’s Head, followed by The Ghosts of Tarawera and The Ghosts of Moonlight Creek, all set in historical New Zealand locations and based around topics as diverse as Captain Cook’s voyages to New Zealand, the 1886 eruption of Mt Tarawera, and Chinese gold miners in Central Otago. She has created soundtracks for these books on Booktrack and The Ghosts of Young Nick's Head was number 1 in Booktrack's Most Popular in 2015.

With a group of other writers, she runs an online writing initiative for children called FABO Story and she visits schools as part of the New Zealand Book Council Writers in Schools programme.

She has two children and divides her time between the United Kingdom and New Zealand.

== Awards and Prizes ==
Sue Copsey's first published book, Children Just Like Me, won the Times Educational Supplement Best Children’s Non-fiction Book 1995, the Reader’s Digest Best Children’s Non-fiction Book 1995 and the Blue Peter (BBC) Best Non-fiction Children's Book 1995.

Several of her later books have been named as Storylines Notable Books and The Ghosts of Moonlight Creek was a Sir Julius Vogel Award Finalist in the Best Youth Novel category in 2017.

The Ghosts of Tarawera was chosen as a #NZreadaloud title in 2016 and again in 2025.

In May 2018, Copsey submitted the winning pitch in the Pitch Perfect competition run as part of the New Zealand Society of Authors’ AGM. Vicki Marsdon and Nadine Rubin Nathan of High Spot Literary chose Copsey’s pitch and sold her first adult novel Wife After Wife – a modern re-telling of the story of King Henry VIII - to UK publisher Little, Brown Book Group as part of a two-book deal for publication in 2019, under the pseudonym Olivia Hayfield. Her subsequent novels Sister to Sister, Notorious, and Queen, King, Ace, are retellings of the tales of Queen Elizabeth 1, Richard III and King Arthur.

== Bibliography ==
As Olivia Hayfield

Wife After Wife (Little, Brown UK; Penguin Random House US, 2020)

Sister to Sister (Little, Brown UK; Hachette Australia, Hachette Aotearoa New Zealand, 2021)

Notorious (Little, Brown UK; Hachette Australia, Hachette Aotearoa New Zealand, 2022)

Queen, King, Ace (Treehouse Books, 2024)

Tangled with the Wrong Guy (Imperfect Press, 2025)

Rescuing Rosie (Imperfect Press, 2025)

Children's fiction and non-fiction

Children Just Like Me, co-authored with Barnabas and Anabel Kindersley (Dorling Kindersley, 1995)

Dorling Kindersley Illustrated Factopedia (1994) (contributor)

Meet Bumble and Friends; Bumble's Missing Drink; Bumble Camps Out (with TVNZ) (Random House, 1999)

Our Children Aotearoa: ō tātou tamariki (Pearson, 2011)

When Bo Bimble Went Elsewhere (Treehouse Books, 2021)

Spooky Adventure series:

The Ghosts of Young Nick's Head (Treehouse Books, 2012)

The Ghosts of Tarawera (Treehouse Books, 2015)

The Ghosts of Moonlight Creek (Treehouse Books, 2016)
