= Sharon Holt =

Children's book writer, publisher, and creator from New Zealand

- Born: 1959 (age 66–67); Auckland
- Occupation: Writer

Sharon Holt is a children's writer, publisher and creator of books and resources in Te Reo Māori. Several of her books have won or been shortlisted for awards, and her Te Reo Singalong series won its category in both Ngā Tohu Reo Māori / Māori Language Awards in 2013 and the CLNZ Educational Publishing Awards in 2015. She lives in Te Aroha, New Zealand.

== Biography ==
Sharon Holt was born in Auckland in 1959. She grew up in Glen Innes, Auckland, and moved to the Waikato in 1997, where she lived in Leamington (near Cambridge), Kihikihi and then Hamilton.

She dreamed of being an author from a child, but worked as a teacher and journalist before moving into writing and publishing. When her children were young, she began submitting work to publishers. Since then, many of her books, stories, poems, plays and articles have been published in both the trade and educational market.

In 2002, with little prior knowledge of the language, and unsure even how to correctly pronounce Māori place names, she took a course in te reo Māori at Te Wānanga o Aotearoa. Although she is non-Māori, she soon developed a passion for te reo and was supported by her tutors and fellow students to continue her Māori language journey. She set up her own publishing business (The Writing Bug Ltd) to produce a series of books in te reo which use simple and repetitive sentence structures tied to a catchy tune to encourage confidence in using te reo Māori. She continues to write and market these Te Reo Singalong picture books and accompanying resources which are now published by EduMaxi. She also presents Te Reo Singalong shows as well as taking workshops in person and online in te reo pronunciation.

She has appeared at a number of festivals and literary events including the Auckland Writers Festival. She visits schools under the Writers in Schools programme and takes Professional Development sessions for teachers.

Sharon Holt is married with two children and now lives in Te Aroha.

== Awards and prizes ==
In 2007, Holt was a finalist (with illustrator Ross Kinnaird) in the non-fiction category of the New Zealand Post Children's Book Awards for It's True! You Can Make Your Own Jokes. The same book (in 2007) and Your Mother Didn't Do That! (in 2010) were also named as Storylines Notable Books.

The Te Reo Singalong series won the Print category in Ngā Tohu Reo Māori / Māori Language Awards in 2013 and was a finalist in 2012 and 2014. It also won Best Te Reo Resource and the Teachers' Choice Award at the 2015 CLNZ Educational Publishing Awards.

== Bibliography ==
- It's True! You Can Make Your Own Jokes, illustrated by Ross Kinnaird (Allen & Unwin, 2006)
- Sabotage! The Diary of Rowan Webb, Auckland, 1985 [My Story] (Scholastic, 2008)
- Your Mother Didn't Do That! ill. Brian Lovelock (Walker Books 2009)
- No Survivors: The Diary of Jackie Simms, Hamilton, 1979 [My Story] (Scholastic, 2009)
- Maranga Mai! ill. Deborah Hinde (The Writing Bug, 2012)
- Kei te Peke Ahau, ill. Deborah Hinde (The Writing Bug, 2012)
- Anei Ke! ill. Deborah Hinde (The Writing Bug, 2012)
- Me Haere! ill. Deborah Hinde (The Writing Bug, 2013)
- E Hia Nga Moe? ill. Deborah Hinde (The Writing Bug, 2013)
- Matariki, ill. Deborah Hinde (The Writing Bug, 2014)
- He aha tēnei? ill. Deborah Hinde (The Writing Bug, 2014)
- Whai Mai, ill.y Deborah Hinde (The Writing Bug, 2014)
- Mahi Tahi, ill. Deborah Hinde (The Writing Bug, 2015)
- Kōrero Mai, ill. Deborah Hinde (The Writing Bug, 2015)
- Te Wairua o Waitangi, with photographs by Sophie Holt and others (The Writing Bug, 2016)
- Kia Ora, ill. Deborah Hinde (The Writing Bug, 2016)
- Taku Mōkai, with photographs by Sophie Holt (The Writing Bug, 2016)
- Te Taiao, with photographs by Rachael Hale-McKenna (The Writing Bug, 2017)
- Ngā Āhua, ill. Josh Morgan (The Writing Bug, 2017)
- Kōrero Māori ai au, ill. Claudia Gadotti (The Writing Bug 2018)
- Ka Maumahara Tonu, ill. Jasmine Bailey (The Writing Bug, 2018)
- He Mīharo Te Manu, illustrated with native bird photographs (EduMaxi, 2018)
- Haere Tonu ill. Miles Lawford (EduMaxi, 2018)
- He Huarākau illustrated by Stephanie Thatcher (EduMaxi 2019)
- Picture Dictionary illustrated by Sarah Loughran, Miles Lawford and Stephanie Thatcher (EduMaxi, 2019)
- Ngā waka aituā illustrated by Francesca da Sacco (EduMaxi, 2019)
- Kua tae mai te Pō illustrated by Stephanie Thatcher (EduMaxi, 2019
- Te Haerenga illustrated by Stephanie Thatcher (EduMaxi, 2020)
