= Elena de Roo =

New Zealand author and poet

Elena de Roo is a New Zealand children's writer and poet. She has been the recipient of several awards including the Todd New Writer’s Bursary in 2010 and the University of Otago College of Education / Creative New Zealand Children's Writer in Residence Fellowship in 2020. She lives in Auckland, New Zealand.

== Biography ==
Elena de Roo was born in Hamilton. She attended seven different primary schools around New Zealand until moving to Auckland when she was eleven.

She graduated with a degree in English from the University of Auckland and later worked as a librarian.

She started writing for children in 2004. Several of her books have been named in the Storylines Notable Books List. She has written for educational publishers in New Zealand, Australia and the United States. Her work has also appeared in Poems in the Waiting Room, online blogs and anthologies such as A Treasury of NZ Poems for Children (Penguin Random House, 2014) and Summer Days: Stories and Poems Celebrating the Kiwi Summer (Penguin Random House, 2017).

She is one of the authors of the children’s writing online competition FABO Story.

In 2018, Elena de Roo completed a Master of Creative Writing at Auckland University of Technology.

She is married with three children and lives in Auckland.

== Awards and Prizes ==
Elena de Roo was the recipient of the Todd New Writer’s Bursary in 2010. In the same year, she won the Manawatū (New Zealand) International Poetry for Performance Competition. She was Commended in the 2019 National Flash Fiction Day Competition.

In 2020, she was awarded the University of Otago College of Education Creative New Zealand Children's Writer in Residence Fellowship.

== Bibliography ==
- On a Roll, Illustrated by Duncan Scott (Rainbow Reading Programme, 2007)
- Super Squeeze, Illustrated by Duncan Scott (Rainbow Reading Programme, 2007)
- Blender Trouble, Illustrated by Peter Lole (Rainbow Reading Programme, 2007)
- The Rain Train, illustrated by Brian Lovelock (Walker Books Australia, 2010)
- Ophelia Wild, Secret Spy, ill. Tracy Duncan (Walker Books Australia, 2012)
- Ophelia Wild, Deadly Detective, ill. Tracy Duncan (Walker Books Australia, 2014)
- The Name at the End of the Ladder (Walker Books Australia, 2014)
- Catch a Cloud, Illustrated by Anuska Allepuz (Faber & Faber, 2020)
- Rush, Rush! illustrated by Jenny Cooper (One Tree House, 2021)
- To Catch a Cloud, ill. Hannah Peck (Faber, 2023)

== See also ==
- List of New Zealand poets
