= Melanie Drewery =

New Zealand children's writer

- Born: 1970 (age 54–55); Palmerston North, New Zealand
- Occupation: Writer; illustrator; potter
- Genre: Children's picture books
- Notable works: Nanny Mihi series
- Notable awards: 2008 Best Picture Book at the New Zealand Post Book Awards for Children and Young Adults
- Spouse: Henk Vermeer
- Children: 2

Melanie Jane Drewery (born 1970) is a New Zealand children's writer, illustrator and potter, best-known for her Nanny Mihi series of children's picture books. Her books feature Māori language and culture. She has said she believes it is important for New Zealand children to see their culture reflected in books. In 2008 her book Tahi: One Lucky Kiwi won the award for Best Picture Book at the New Zealand Post Book Awards for Children and Young Adults.

== Life and career ==
Drewery was born in Palmerston North in 1970. She is of Māori descent, affiliated with the iwi of Ngāti Māhanga, and is also of Italian and English descent. She attended Queen Charlotte College in Picton, and obtained a certificate in craft and design from Nelson Polytechnic. She has been based in Nelson for many years. In addition to writing children's books she is also a potter and painter. She has said it took her 13 years of sending manuscripts to publishers before her first children's book was published.

Her best-known books are the Nanny Mihi picture book series, first published in 2001 and usually illustrated by Tracy Duncan. Her books have been described by reviewer Peter Gibbs as introducing te reo Māori "in an engaging and non-threatening way, so her books are sprinkled with Maori tradition, language and culture". Many of her books are available in both English and Māori editions, with the English versions using key Māori language words and phrases. She has explained that she believes "it's important for children to have their culture reflected for them". The character of Nanny Mihi was adapted for children's television show Tau Kē on Māori Television in 2007, played by Robynleigh Emery. Emery also produced a CD collection of original songs as Nanny Mihi during Māori Language Week.

In 2004 she received a Creative New Zealand grant of NZ$6000 towards her writing. In 2005 her book Koro's Medicine was a finalist for best picture book at the New Zealand Post Book Awards for Children and Young Adults. The Māori translation, Nga Rongoa a Koro (translated by Kararaina Uatuku) won the Te Kuru Pounamu Award at the 2005 LIANZA Children's Book Awards. Drewery has described the book as being an introduction to rongoā Māori (traditional Māori medicine), in which a grandfather teaches his grandson about the use of traditional remedies like mānuka. In October 2007 her book The Grumble Rumble Mumbler was selected as the official book for New Zealand's Biggest Storytime In Library Week. In 2008 The Mad Tadpole Adventure was nominated for the best junior fiction award at the New Zealand Post Book Awards. A number of her books have been listed as Storylines Notable Books, including Matariki (2004), Koro's Medicine (2005), Nanny Mihi's Christmas (2006), Itiiti's Gift (2007), The Mad Tadpole Adventure (2008), The Grumble Rumble Mumbler (2008), Dad's Takeaways (2008), Tahi: One Lucky Kiwi (2008), and Big Fish, Little Fish (2009).

In 2008 her book Tahi: One Lucky Kiwi, illustrated by Ali Teo and John O'Reilly, won Best Picture Book at the New Zealand Post Book Awards for Children and Young Adults. It featured the one-legged kiwi Tahi based at Wellington Zoo. Also in 2008, the Wellington Children's Book Association distributed free copies of her book Papa's Island, about an Italian father held prisoner on Matiu / Somes Island during World War II, to mark Anzac Day.

== Selected works ==
=== Nanny Mihi series ===
- Nanny Mihi & the Rainbow (Reed, 2001), illustrated by Tracy Duncan
- Nanny Mihi's Garden (Reed, 2002), illustrated by Tracy Duncan
- Nanny Mihi's Birthday Surprise (Reed, 2003), illustrated by Tracy Duncan
- Nanny Mihi's Treasure Hunt (Reed, 2004), illustrated by Tracy Duncan
- Nanny Mihi's Christmas (Reed, 2006), illustrated by Tracy Duncan
- Nanny Mihi and the Bellbird (Oratia Books, 2018), illustrated by Tracy Duncan
- Nanny Mihi's Medicine / Ngā Rongoā a Nanny Mihi (Oratia Books, 2022), illustrated by Suzanne Simpson

=== Other works ===
- Matariki (Reed, 2003 and Puffin, 2009), illustrated by Bruce Potter
- The Treasure (Reed, 2003), illustrated by Bruce Potter
- Child of Aotearoa (Reed, 2004), illustrated by Bruce Potter
- Koro's Medicine (Huia, 2004), illustrated by Sabrina Malcolm
- Papa's Island (Reed, 2006), illustrated by Fifi Colston
- The Grumble Rumble Mumbler (Huia, 2007), illustrated by Josh Smith and Stacey Macfarlane
- Itiiti's Gift (Reed, 2007), illustrated by Fifi Colston
- Dad's Takeaways (Mallinson Rendel, 2007), illustrated by Christopher White
- The Mad Tadpole Adventure (Scholastic, 2007), illustrated by Jenny Cooper
- Tahi: One Lucky Kiwi (Random House, 2007), illustrated by Ali Teo and John O'Reilly
- Big Fish, Little Fish (Raupo, 2008)
- Jiminy Shows Off (Mallinson Rendel, 2008)
- Stories from our Night Sky (Picture Puffin, 2009), illustrated by Jenny Cooper
- Yucky Mucky (Duck Creek Press, 2012), illustrated by Trevor Pye
- Fishing Fame (Scholastic, 2012), illustrated by John Bennett
