= Adele Broadbent =

New Zealand children's author

- Born: 17 April 1968 (age 58); Napier, New Zealand
- Occupation: Children's author
- Known for: Writing
- Website: Adele Broadbent official website

Adele Broadbent (born 17 April 1968) is a New Zealand children's author.

== Biography ==
Broadbent was born in Napier, New Zealand, on 17 April 1968.

Broadbent's early book publications include The Bike Race (2008), Ninjas! (2008), Not Exactly (2008), The Biggest Catch (2010) and The Winner Is (2010).

Too Many Secrets (2010) was nominated in the 2011 New Zealand Post Children's Book Awards. The story was one of Broadbent's first novels for children and young adults. One reviewer found the main character, Rebecca, too selfish to be likeable at first, but then became engrossed in the mysteries Rebecca encounters in her new home in the country.

Just Jack (2011) deals with the 1931 Hawke's Bay earthquake as part of the plot. The story borrows from Broadbent's own family stories, told by her grandfather. New Zealand Books calls Broadbent's writing in Just Jack "fresh, convincing and distinctive." It was named a Storylines Notable Book in 2012, and a 2012 New Zealand Children's Book Awards Junior Fiction finalist.

Trouble in Time was shortlisted for the LIANZA Esther Glen Junior Fiction Award, and was named a Storylines Notable Book in that year.

Broadbent appears as a character in Bookshop Detectives: Tea and Cake and Death, a 2025 novel by Louise and Gareth Ward.

== Books ==
- Ninjas!, 2008, New Zealand, Wendy Pye Publishing ISBN 9781877456268
- The Bike Race, 2008, New Zealand, Wendy Pye Publishing ISBN 9781877456299
- The Biggest Catch, 2009, New Zealand, Wendy Pye Publishing ISBN 9781877482748
- The Winner Is, 2010, New Zealand, Wendy Pye Publishing ISBN 9781877508066
- Too Many Secrets, 2010, New Zealand, HarperCollins Publishers ISBN 9781869508562
- Just Jack, 2011, New Zealand, HarperCollins Publishers ISBN 9781869508869
- The Last Herrick Secret, 2012, New Zealand, AV Project ISBN 9780473224110
- Trouble in Time, 2014, New Zealand, Scholastic ISBN 9781775432265
- Between, 2018, New Zealand, OneTree House ISBN 9780995106420
- IF ONLY, 2020, New Zealand, OneTree House ISBN 9780995117532
