= Ngāreta Gabel =

New Zealand writer

- Born: 29 July 1975 (age 51); Auckland, New Zealand
- Education: University of Waikato (MA); Wellington College of Education (diploma)
- Occupations: Children's author; teacher

Ngāreta Mary Gabel (born 29 July 1975) is a New Zealand children's author and teacher, known for her Māori language children's picture book Tekiteora, kei hea o hu?, later published in English as Oh Hogwash, Sweet Pea!.

== Life and career ==
Gabel was born in Auckland on 29 July 1975. She has one daughter, and began writing in the Māori language to create stories for her daughter. She has a Master of Arts degree in Maori with first-class honours from the University of Waikato, and a teaching diploma from the Wellington College of Education which she earned remotely while living in Northland. She has worked as a teacher at Te Kura Kaupapa Māori o Kaikohe. She is part of the iwi (tribe) of Ngāti Kahu.

Her children's picture book Tekiteora, kei hea o hu? was published by Huia Publishers in 2003, and won the Te Kura Pounamu Award from LIANZA. It was translated into English by Hannah Rainforth as Oh Hogwash, Sweet Pea!. Both editions were illustrated by Ali Teo and Astrid Jensen. Gabel worked with Rainforth on the translation and ensuring that it reflected Gabel's northern iwi dialect, for example by using the term kūkupa for the kererū.

The English title won the children's choice award and was a finalist for best picture book at the 2004 New Zealand Post Book Awards for Children and Young Adults. It was listed as a 2004 Storylines Notable Book. A review in The New Zealand Herald described it as a "delightful picture book" with a "distinctive New Zealand flavour".
