= Nikki Slade Robinson =

New Zealand children's picture book writer and illustrator

- Born: 1968 (age 57–58) Te Puke, New Zealand
- Occupation: Writer and illustrator

Nikola Slade Robinson (born 1968), generally known as Nikki Slade Robinson, is a New Zealand children’s picture book writer and illustrator. Her books have been widely reviewed and shortlisted for a number of awards. The Little Kiwi’s Matariki won the Best Picture Book section of the 2016 New Zealand Book Awards for Children and Young Adults.

== Biography ==
Nikki (Nikola) Slade Robinson was born in Te Puke in 1968. From the age of five years, she drew constantly, read widely and wanted to make children’s books when she grew up. She was educated at Woodlands School and Ōpōtiki College, and studied for a Diploma of Visual Communications Design (Illustration) at Wellington Polytechnic. Her writing and illustrating career began with freelance work and submitting her portfolio to publishers. She illustrated her first book at age 21.

As well as writing and illustrating her own books, and illustrating books for others, she has worked on many educational titles including some in the Māori language for kura kaupapa Māori and kōhanga reo. She is an environmentalist and her work often covers themes of conservation.

Nikki Slade Robinson has two daughters and lives near Ōpōtiki.

== Awards and prizes ==
Several of her books have won or been shortlisted for book awards. The Little Kiwi’s Matariki was Best Picture Book winner in the 2016 New Zealand Book Awards for Children and Young Adults. She has received Storylines Notable Book Awards for The Seven Stars of Matariki/Te Huihui o Matariki (2009), Muddle & Mo (2016), Witch's Cat Wanted: Apply Within (2017) and Muddle and Mo’s Rainy Day (2019).

Other awards include the LIANZA Te Kura Pounamu Medal Winner for The Puriri Tree/Te Puriri (2001), Sir Julius Vogel Finalist for Professional Illustration for The Seven Stars of Matariki/Te Huihui o Matariki (2009), Pride in Print: Highly Commended Professional Design for In Love with Moko (2102) and New Zealand Children's Art House Foundation award for Artist Most Supporting Children (2017).

== Publications ==
As writer and illustrator

- That's not Junk! (Penguin, 2009)
- Hannah Bandanna's Hair (Scholastic, 2010)
- Munkle Arvur and the Bod (Scholastic, 2012)
- Munkle Arvur and the Big Dry (Scholastic, 2014)
- Muddle and Mo (Duck Creek Press, 2015; North American release by Houghton Mifflin Harcourt, Australian release by Starfish Bay, release for China)
- The Roadman Boogie (Duck Creek Press, 2015; international release by Starfish Bay)
- The Little Kiwi's Matariki (Duck Creek Press, 2016)
- Muddle and Mo's Worm Surprise (Duck Creek Press, 2016)
- I am an Artist (Duck Creek Press, 2016; North American release by Houghton Mifflin Harcourt)
- Ruru's Hangi (Duck Creek Press, 2017)
- The Little Kiwi and the Treaty (Duck Creek Press, 2018)
- Muddle and Mo’s Rainy Day (Duck Creek Press, 2018)
- Weka’s Waiata (Duck Creek Press, 2018)
- Bottoms (Duck Creek Press, 2019)

As illustrator

- The Cross Little Cat/Te Poti Pukuriri by Robyn Pierce (Scholastic, 1992)
- Don't forget that Box by Barbara Hill (Scholastic, 1992)
- The Puriri Tree/Te Puriri by Merito Tawhara (Huia, 2000)
- An explanation of Poetry to my Father by Glenn Colquhoun (Steele Roberts, 2001)
- Mr Short, Mr Thin, Mr Bald and Mr Dog by Glenn Colquhoun (Steele Roberts, 2005)
- How We Fell by Glenn Colquhoun (Steele Roberts, 2006)
- The Pine-cone Track by Joan Anderson (Scholastic, 2007)
- The Seven Stars of Matariki/Te Huihui o Matariki by Toni Rolleston-Cummins (Huia, 2008)
- Starkey the Gentle Pirate by Peter Bland (Steele Roberts, 2010)
- In Love with Moko: The story of a New Zealand Dolphin co-authored with Val Bird, (Mann Print, 2011)
- Mind your Gramma by Yvonne Morrison (Scholastic, 2012)
- Paradise: Eastern Bay of Plenty co-authored with Andrea Cooper, (Mann Print, 2015)
- Witch's Cat Wanted: Apply Within by Joy H Davidson (Scholastic, 2016)
- So Special written by David Hill (Duck Creek Press, 2017; also published as He Tino Taonga)
- There's a Tui in our Teapot / Hei Tui kei ro Tipata by Dawn McMillan (Oratia Press, 2018)
- William’s Waitangi Day by David Ling (Duck Creek Press, 2018)
- The Marae Visit by Rebecca Beyer and Linley Wellington (Duck Creek Press, 2019)
- Hedgehog Heart by James Antoniou (Duck Creek Press, 2020)
