= Eirlys Hunter =

British-born New Zealand writer

- Born: 10 May 1952 (age 74); London, England
- Occupation: Writer
- Children: 4
- Website: Eirlys Hunter

Eirlys Elisabeth Hunter (born 10 May 1952) is a writer and creative writing teacher in New Zealand. She was born in London, England.

== Biography ==
Eirlys Hunter was born on 10 May 1952 in London, England. She has Welsh heritage (Eirlys is a Welsh name) and grew up in the United Kingdom.

Hunter moved to Wellington, New Zealand, in 1983, and began writing seriously when the last of her children went to kindergarten. In 1991, she took the Original Composition class with Bill Manhire at Victoria University of Wellington and in 1998 she completed a Master of Arts degree in creative writing. She has written one adult novel and eight novels for children. Her 2018 children's novel, The Mapmakers' Race, was described by Kate De Goldi as poised, stylish and an utter delight.

Hunter's short stories have been broadcast on Radio New Zealand, and published in journals such as Sport and Landfall, and in anthologies such as Best New Zealand Fiction 2 (edited by Fiona Kidman) and Best New Zealand Fiction 4 (edited by Fiona Farrell). She has written stories and plays for the New Zealand School Journal and other educational publications, and visited schools with the New Zealand Book Council's Writers in Schools programme. She went on the Book Council's Words on Wheels tours in 2001 and 2002, and in 2003, she was writer-in-residence at the American Embassy School in New Delhi, India.

Hunter has been a teacher of creative writing, judge, assessor, mentor, website administrator and board member for literary organisations. She was a founder member (and chair) of the Wellington Writers Walk committee in 2001. She was on the judging panel for the New Zealand Post Children's Book Awards in 2013, and has also been judge for the Jack Lasenby Award (Junior), short-story judge for the Ronald Hugh Morrieson literary awards in 2013, and youth judge for the NFFD (National Flash Fiction Day) youth competition in 2019. In 2016, she and Louise O’Brien founded the website Hooked on NZ Books He Ao Ano for young adults.

Hunter has led writing workshops for children and adults, and from 2006 to 2019, she taught CREW255 Writing for Children at the International Institute of Modern Letters at Victoria University of Wellington. She was on the Board of NZ Review of Books Pukapuka Aotearoa.

Hunter has four children, and lives in Wellington.

== Awards and prizes ==
The Robber and the Millionaire was shortlisted for the 1997 Aim Children's Book Awards, and The Mapmakers' Race was shortlisted in the junior fiction section for the 2019 New Zealand Book Awards for Children and Young Adults.

The Mapmakers' Race was the New Zealand entry in the IBBY Honour List 2020, a biennial selection of outstanding, recently published books, honouring writers, illustrators and translators from IBBY member countries.

Hunter has received Storylines Notable Book Awards for Coldkeep Castle (2002) and The Mapmakers' Race (2019).

== Publications ==
Adult fiction

- Between Black and White (Random House, 2000)

Children's fiction

- The Robber and the Millionaire, illustrated by Nobby Clark (Scholastic, 1996)
- The Astonishing Madam Majolica, illustrated by Kelvin Hawley (Scholastic, 1996)
- The Quake (Scholastic, 1999)
- The Finn's Quest trilogy:
  - The Queen-Seekers (Scholastic, 2000)
  - Coldkeep Castle (Scholastic, 2001)
  - The Slave-Stealers (Scholastic, 2004)
- The Mapmakers' Race (Gecko Press, 2018)
- The Uprising – The Mapmakers in Cruxcia (Gecko Press, 2021)
