= The Whizbanger That Emmental Built =

2006 children's novel by Reuben Schwarz

- Author: Reuben Schwarz
- Language: English
- Genre: Children's
- Published: 2006
- Publisher: Puffin Books
- Publication place: New Zealand

The Whizbanger That Emmental Built (2006) is a children's novel written by New Zealand author, Reuben Schwarz. The novel tells the story of Emmental Baker, daughter of famed writer Niall Baker, and her adventures with the bizarre inventor Chaida Manning. The Whizbanger That Emmental Built was published by in 2006 by Penguin Books, under the banner of Puffin Books.

== Reuben Schwarz ==
Reuben Schwarz (12 December 1978) was born in New Zealand, but moved to Canada as a child. Raised in Alberta and West Vancouver, British Columbia, Reuben earned a Bachelor of Science degree from the University of British Columbia. After failing to be accepted to medical school, Schwarz enrolled at the University of Toronto. There he was the editor of the student newspaper, The Independent Weekly.

In 2004 Schwarz returned to New Zealand, earning a Graduate Diploma in Journalism from the University of Canterbury in Christchurch. Upon graduation, Schwarz began reporting for The Dominion Post in Wellington. Schwarz is the winner of two Qantas Media Awards.

== Synopsis ==
The Whizbanger That Emmental Built tells the story of Emmental Baker, a bright but shy girl. Emmental's mother has recently died and her father, infamous writer and recluse Niall Baker, has relocated the family to the imaginary town of Dropsham in the hopes of curing his writer's block.

Emme struggles to fit in her new surroundings, persecuted by her teacher Mrs. Hanlin and bullied by class brute Rory Blunt. With her father despondent and detached, Emme finds friendship with her neighbor, bizarre inventor Chaida Manning. As Emme's friendship with Manning grows, she learns to accept her creativity and individualism, gaining self-confidence.

== Themes ==
Typical children's literary themes are expressed in Whizbanger. The main character, Emmental Baker, is vulnerable, and oppressed by society (her school teacher Mrs. Hanlon and classmate Rory Blunt). This theme is consistent throughout children's literature, from the fairytales of the Cinderella genre to J.K. Rowling's Harry Potter.

== Characters ==
=== Emmental Baker ===
Emmental, or "Emme" is the protagonist of the story. She is shy and gentle, yet creative and bright. Suffering the death of her mother and the neglect of her author father, she finds strength in her own imagination.

=== Niall Baker ===
Emme's father, Niall is the author of eleven acclaimed novels and three not-so-acclaimed ones; he struggles from writer's block. His wife, Emme's mother, is recently deceased.

=== Chaida Manning ===
Chaida Manning is the bizarre inventor of atrocities, such as the Wooshraker and Pitchaptchapitcha. Ultimately Chaida is Emme's salvation, teaching her to trust her imagination.

=== Rory Blunt ===
Rory Blunt is the violent antagonist and Emme's classmate. Typical of a bully, he picks on defenseless Emme. He is also prone to bouts of violence and paranoia. Rory takes pleasure is bashing things, at times returning home to retrieve his best bashing boots.

== Awards ==
In 2007, The Whizbanger That Emmental Built was shortlisted for Library Association of New Zealand's (LIANZA) Esther Glen Award.
