= Philippa Werry =

New Zealand writer and librarian

- Born: 13 September 1958 (age 67); Christchurch, New Zealand
- Writing career
- Language: English
- Website: philippawerry.co.nz

Philippa Werry (born 13 September 1958) is a New Zealand librarian and writer of fiction and non-fiction for children and young adults.

== Biography ==
Werry was born in Christchurch on 13 September 1958.

Her book Iris and Me won the Young Adult Fiction Award at the 2023 New Zealand Book Awards for Children and Young Adults.

== Bibliography ==
- Iris and Me (The Cuba Press, 2023)
- The Other Sister (Pipi Press, 2021)
- This is Where I Stand, illustrated by Kieran Rynhart (Scholastic, 2021)
- Our Incredible Dogs (New Holland, 2020)
- Antarctic Journeys (New Holland, 2019)
- The Telegram (Pipi Press, 2019)
- The New Zealand Wars (New Holland, 2018)
- Armistice Day: The New Zealand story: what it is and why it matters (New Holland, 2016)
- Waitangi Day: the New Zealand story: what it is and why it matters (New Holland, 2015)
- Best Mates, illustrated by Bob Kerr (New Holland, 2014)
- Harbour Bridge (Scholastic, 2014)
- Anzac Day: The New Zealand Story: What It Is and Why It Matters (New Holland 2013)
- Lighthouse Family (Scholastic, 2013)
- A Girl Called Harry (Scholastic 2010)
- Enemy at the Gate (Scholastic 2008)
- The Great Chocolate Cake Bake Off (Scholastic 2007)
- Top Secret (Gilt Edge Publishing 2006)
- Wonderful Wheels Day, illustrated by Alice Bell (Scholastic 2004)
- The Lost Watch, illustrated by Alice Bell (Scholastic 2003).
