= Glyn Harper =

New Zealand military historian and university professor (born 1958)

Glyn Harper QSM
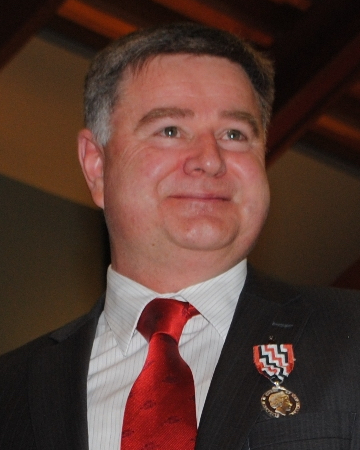
- Harper in 2012
- Born: Glyn John Harper; 12 March 1958 (age 68); Christchurch, New Zealand

Academic background
- Education: University of Canterbury (MA); University of New England (PhD)
- Thesis: "Kip": Major General Sir Howard Kippenberger, KBE, CB, DSO and Bar, ED : a study of command (1996)

Academic work
- Main interests: New Zealand military history
- Website: www.glynharper.nz

Glyn John Harper QSM (born 12 March 1958) is a New Zealand historian who specialises in the military history of the 20th century. He has published several books on New Zealand's participation in the First and Second World Wars.

== Biography ==
Born on 12 March 1958 in Christchurch, Harper was trained as a secondary school teacher, earning a diploma in teaching from Christchurch Teachers' College in 1980. He then joined the University of Canterbury, graduating with a Bachelor of Arts degree in 1981. After completing a Master of Arts degree the following year with a thesis on the Fall of Singapore, he moved to Australia, teaching at Catholic schools in New South Wales.

In 1988, Harper joined the Australian Army in which he served for eight years before transferring to the New Zealand Army. He earned a Doctor of Philosophy in 2001 from the University of New England with a thesis on Howard Kippenberger, a New Zealand general of the Second World War. Harper was the official historian for New Zealand's military deployment to East Timor from 1999 to 2001. He retired from the New Zealand Army in 2001 with the rank of lieutenant colonel. He became a lecturer at Massey University in Palmerston North, and was made an associate professor in military studies the following year. In 2003 he was appointed director of the Centre for Defence Studies. He was Professor of War Studies at Massey University until his retirement.

Harper was awarded a Fulbright Senior Scholarship in 2010 and carried out five months of research at the Virginia Military Institute and the US Army's War College on the Battle of Monte Cassino. This resulted in the publication of a book on this topic in 2013.

In 2011, Harper became a project manager for the publication of the First World War Centenary Print Histories, a series of books on New Zealand's role in the First World War. He wrote one volume in the series, Johnny Enzed: The New Zealand Soldier in the First World War, which was published in 2015. In the 2012 Queen's Birthday and Diamond Jubilee Honours, in recognition of his services to historical research, Harper was awarded the Queen's Service Medal. In March 2019 he was awarded a Museum Medal by the Auckland War Memorial Museum and made a Fellow of the museum. This was in recognition of his work as a war historian.

As well as his non-fiction historical works for adults, Harper has written several children's picture books with military themes, including Le Quesnoy, Roly, the Anzac Donkey, and Bobby the Littlest War Hero. In 2015, he won the Best Picture Book Award at the New Zealand Book Awards for Children and Young Adults for his book Jim's Letters, which was illustrated by Jenny Cooper.

== Publications ==
Harper's publications include:

Author

- Kippenberger: An Inspired New Zealand Commander (1997)
- Massacre at Passchendaele: The New Zealand Story (2000)
- Operation East Timor: The New Zealand Defence Force in East Timor 1999–2001 (2001) (co-authored with John Crawford)
- Spring Offensive: New Zealand and the Second Battle of the Somme (2003)
- Dark Journey: Three Key New Zealand Battles of the Western Front (2007)
- In the Face of the Enemy: The Complete History of the Victoria Cross and New Zealand (2007) (co-authored with Colin Richardson)
- Images of War: New Zealand and the First World War in Photographs (2013)
- The Battles of Monte Cassino: The Campaign and its Controversies (2013) (co-authored with John Tonkin-Covell)
- Johnny Enzed: The New Zealand Soldier in the First World War 1914–1918 (2015)
- The Battle for North Africa: El Alamein and the Turning Point for World War II (2017)

Editor

- Born to Lead? Portraits of New Zealand Commanders (2003) (co-editor with Joel Hayward)
- Letters from Gallipoli: New Zealand Soldiers Write Home (2011)
