= Ned Barraud =

New Zealand illustrator and writer

- Born: 1976 (age 49–50)
- Occupations: Illustrator; writer
- Known for: Illustrated a number of children’s non-fiction books
- Notable work: illustrated the Explore & Discover series, At the Beach, What Happened to the Moa, Ruru, Night Hunter
- Relatives: Charles Decimus Barraud (ancestor)

Ned Barraud (born 1976) is a New Zealand illustrator and writer. He has illustrated a number of children’s non-fiction books about New Zealand nature.

== Biography ==
Barraud was born in Nelson, New Zealand in 1976.

He illustrated the Explore & Discover series, a collection of books by author Gillian Candler and published by Potton & Burton. At the Beach, the first book in the series, won the Elsie Locke Award for Non-Fiction in 2013.

For his book What Happened to the Moa published in 2020, Barraud worked with experts, including museum curator and zoologist Mike Dickison, to ensure the content was as authentic as possible.

In 2024, Barraud and author Katie Furze collaborated on the book, Ruru, Night Hunter, which was published by Scholastic. Ruru, Night Hunter was shortlisted for the New Zealand Book Awards for Children and Young Adults, Elsie Locke Non-Fiction Award in 2025.

His book At Home on the Farm was shortlisted for the New Zealand Book Awards for Children and Young Adults, Russell Clark Award for Illustration in 2026.

Barraud currently lives in Karori.
