= V. M. Jones =

Victoria (Vicky) Mary Jones (born 1958) is a children's author.

== Life and career ==
Jones was born on 23 August 1958 in Luanshya, Zambia (then the Federation of Rhodesia and Nyasaland).

She completed a BA in English, Archaeology and Social Anthropology at the University of Cape Town. Jones moved to Christchurch, New Zealand, in 1997 with her husband and two sons, and has written all her books there.

== Books ==
Buddy (2002)

She wrote her first book, 'Buddy', about a boy named Josh Cranford. Josh loves sport and is absolutely determined to win the Energex Iron Kid Triathlon, but due to his twin buddy nearly drowning he has aquaphobia. The book 'Buddy' won the junior fiction section and the Best First Book Award for the 2003 New Zealand Post Book Awards for Children and Young Adults. It was also shortlisted for the 2003 LIANZA Esther Glen Medal.

Juggling With Mandarins;Out of Reach (2003)

Her second book tells the story of a pivotal time in the life of a young boy who is called Phil, a.k.a. Pip. Pip feels he is being called on to fulfil sporting ambitions his father can no longer achieve. He is also struggling with changing feelings for the girl who is his friend next door, when she goes out with his enemy. As well as learning to juggle mandarins, he learns how to juggle new feelings and relationships throughout this book as he learns to climb, a passionate goal.

Serpents of Arakesh (2003)

In the same year, 'Serpents of Arakesh', the first of the Karazan Quartet was released. It follows an orphan named Adam Equinox who was abandoned on the doorstep of Highgate, an orphanage run by the cruel Miss Pilcher. He enters a competition on the back of a bookmark and wins the chance to visit Q, the creator of a computer game called Quest to Karazan. He is transported through a computer in to the fantasy world of Karazan to find the potion of healing to heal Q's daughter Hannah, who is suffering from a rare and potentially fatal form of cancer.

Beyond the Shroud (2004)

Hannah goes to Karazan to rescue her cat Tiger Lily, but forgets to take a computer with her so she can't get back. Adam and his friends have to go bring her back.

Prince of the Wind (2004)

They go to Karazan to prevent conflict between the two worlds of earth and Karazan by finding the Prince of the Wind.

Quest for the Sun (2005)

Adam and his friends must work together to finally overthrow King Karazeel.

Shooting the Moon (2006)

The sequel to Juggling with Mandarins. Pip is beginning to shine in the family but his brother, Nick is slowly being drawn into the world of drugs.
