= Diana Noonan =

New Zealand children's author

Diana Noonan (born 7 January 1960) is a New Zealand children's author. In 2022 she was awarded the Storylines Margaret Mahy Medal for her outstanding contributions to New Zealand literature for young people.

== Biography ==
Noonan was born in Dunedin and attended Waihola Primary School and Tokomairiro High School. She completed a degree in English at the University of Otago in 1980. She completed a teaching diploma the following year and began her career as a teacher. She taught in secondary schools for four years then became a full-time writer. Noonan was Writer in Residence at the Dunedin College of Education in 1993, and was the editor of the New Zealand School Journal for eight years.

Following the 2011 Christchurch earthquake Noonan wrote a children's picture book, Quaky Cat, about a cat's experience of the earthquakes. She donated all royalties to the Christchurch earthquake appeal, raising over $150,000. She and the book's illustrator Gavin Bishop received the North West Christchurch Award 2012 in appreciation of her donation.

== Awards and recognition ==
Year	Award	Result	Work	Notes
2022	Storylines Margaret Mahy Medal	Winner		
2014	LIANZA Russell Clark Award	Finalist	The Teddy Bear's Promise	
2011	LIANZA Russell Clark Award	Finalist	Quaky Cat	
2011	LIANZA Elsie Locke Non-Fiction Award	Finalist	The Tui New Zealand Kids' Garden	
2003	LIANZA Russell Clark Award	Finalist	Auntie Rosie and the Rabbit	
2003	LIANZA Russell Clark Award	Finalist	The Best-Dressed Bear	
2003	New Zealand Book Awards for Children and Young Adults – Picture Book Award	Finalist	Auntie Rosie and the Rabbit	
1998	LIANZA Elsie Locke Non-Fiction Award	Co-winner	The Know, Sow and Grow Kids' Book of Plants	
1997	New Zealand Library and Information Association Award for Non-fiction	Winner	I Spy Wildlife	
1997	New Zealand Library and Information Association Award for Non-fiction	Finalist	The Rocky Shore	
1997	New Zealand Library and Information Association Award for Non-fiction	Finalist	The Garden	
1996	Australian Wilderness Society Environment Award for Children's Literature	Finalist	Hercules	
1995	Aim Children's Book Award for Best Picture Book	Winner	The Best Loved Bear	
1994	Aim Children's Book Award for Best Junior Fiction	Winner	A Dolphin in the Bay	
1994	New Zealand Library Association Esther Glen Award	Finalist	A Dolphin in the Bay	
1991	New Zealand Library Association Esther Glen Award	Finalist	The Silent People	
