= Ruth Paul =

New Zealand children's book author/illustrator (born 1964)

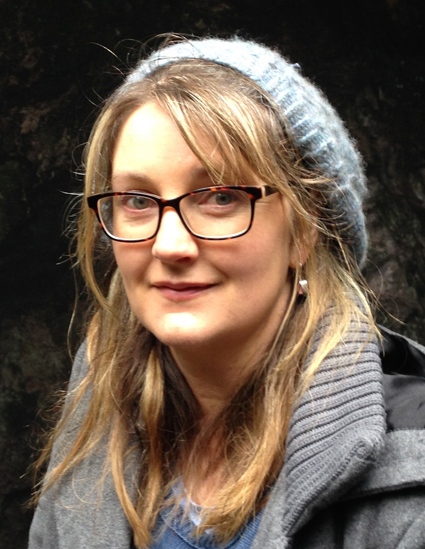
- Paul in 2015
- Born: 1964 (age 61–62)
- Occupations: Writer, illustrator
- Writing career
- Language: English
- Genres: Children's, picture books
- Website: ruthpaul.co.nz

Ruth Paul (born 1964) is a children's picture book author and illustrator from Wellington, New Zealand. Her books have since been translated into many languages.

== Biography ==
She was born in 1964. She grew up in Island Bay, Wellington.

Paul completed a Bachelor of Arts at Victoria University of Wellington, and a Diploma of Visual Communication Design at Wellington Polytechnic (Massey University, Wellington). In 2004 Scholastic NZ published The Animal Undie Ball, her first publication as author and illustrator.

In 2019 she received the Arts Foundation of New Zealand Malinson Rendel Laureate Award for Illustration.

Paul currently lives in Mākara.

== Books ==
- 2004 – The Animal Undie Ball
- 2005 – The Little White Lie
- 2007 – The King's Bubbles
- 2008 – Superpotamus
- 2010 – Two Little Pirates
- 2011 – Stomp!
- 2012 – Hedgehog's Magic Tricks
- 2013 – Red Panda's Toffee Apples
- 2013 – Bad Dog Flash
- 2013 – My Dinosaur Dad
- 2014 – Rabbit's Hide and Seek
- 2014 – Go Home Flash
- 2015 – Bye-Bye Grumpy Fly
- 2015 – What's The Time Dinosaur?
- 2016 – My Meerkat Mum
- 2017 – I Am Jellyfish
- 2018 – Mini Whinny Happy Birthday to Me author Stacy Gregg
- 2018 – Little Hector and the Big Blue Whale
- 2019 – Mini Whinny Goody Four Shoes author Stacy Gregg
- 2019 – Little Hector and the Big Idea
- 2019 – Mini Whinny Bad Day at the Ok Corral author Stacy Gregg
- 2020 – Cookie Boo
- 2020 – Little Hector Meets Mini Maui
- 2021 – Mini Whinny No Place Like Home author Stacy Gregg
- 2022 – Lion Guards the Cake
- 2024 – Hatch and Match
- 2025 – You Can’t Pat a Fish

== Awards ==
- 2005 – Aim Children's Book Awards 2005, Honour Award for Tom's Story ill. Ruth Paul, written by Mandy Hager
- 2008 – NZ Post Children's Book Awards, Children's Choice Award for The King's Bubbles
- 2008 – BPANZ Children's Book Design Award, Winner for The King's Bubbles
- 2011 – Storylines Notable Books listing for Two Little Pirates
- 2012 – Storylines Notable Books listing for Stomp!
- 2012 – New Zealand Post Children's Book Awards, finalist for Stomp!
- 2013 – Storylines Notable Books listing for Bad Dog Flash
- 2018 – New Zealand Book Awards for Children and Young Adults, Picture Book award for I am Jellyfish
- 2018 – Storylines Notable Books Listing for I Am Jellyfish
- 2018 – Storylines Notable Books Listing for Mini Whinny Happy Birthday to Me author Stacy Gregg
- 2019 – NZ Book Awards for Children and Young Adults, finalist for Mini Whinny Happy Birthday to Me author Stacy Gregg
- 2019 – NZ Arts Foundation, Mallinson Rendel Laureate Award
- 2020 – NZ Book Awards for Children and Young Adults, finalist for Mini Whinny Goody Four Shoes author Stacy Gregg
- 2022 – New Zealand Book Awards for Children and Young Adults, Picture Book award for Lion Guards The Cake
- 2023 – University of Otago College of Education Creative NZ Children's Writer in Residence Fellowship
