= My Story (Scholastic New Zealand) =

My Story is a series of historical novels for older children published by Scholastic New Zealand which was inspired by Dear America. Each book is written in the form of a fictional diary of a young person living during an important event or time period in New Zealand history. The series was renamed My New Zealand Story around 2010 when the style of the covers also changed.

== Books ==
- Journey to Tangiwai: The Diary of Peter Cotterill, Napier, 1953 by David Hill (2003)
- A Better Life: The Diary of Ivana Ivanovich, Dargaville, 1924–25 by Amelia Batistich (2003)
- Abandon Ship!: The Diary of Debbie Atherton, Wellington, 1968 by Shirley Corlett (2003) [Retitled The Wahine Disaster: Wellington, 1968 in 2012
- Finding Father: The Journal of Mary Brogan, Otago, 1862 by Pauline Cartwright (2004) [Retitled Gold: Otago, 1862 in 2010
- Earthquake: The Diary of Katie Bourke, Napier, 1930–31 by Janine McVeagh (2004)
- A New Song in the Land: The Writings of Atapo, Paihia, c1840 by Fleur Beale (2004) [Retitled Mission Girl: Paihia, c.1840 in 2010
- Below the Mountains: The Diary of Amy McDonald, Milford Road, 1935–36 by Jean Bennett (2005)
- Chinatown Girl: The Diary of Silvey Chan, Auckland, 1942 by Eva Wong Ng (2005)
- Fire in the Sky: The Diary of James Collier, Tarawera, 1886 by Shirley Corlett (2005)
- A Long Way From Home: The Diary of Lillian Glenmore, Whangateau, 1943 by Lorraine Orman (2005) [Retitled Here Come the Marines: Warkworth, 1943 in 2012
- Escape from Sarau: The Diary of Emilie Ritter, Nelson District, 1882 by Leone Morris-Bensemann (2006)
- Aquarius, My Ohu Year: The Diary of Starshine Penney, 1975 by Jill Brasell (2006)
- Castaway: The Diary of Samuel Abraham Clark, Disappointment Island, 1907 by Bill O'Brien (2006)
- Sitting on the Fence: The Diary of Martin Daly, Christchurch, 1981 by Bill Nagelkerke (2007) Retitled Stop the Tour
- Kauri in My Blood: The Diary of Laura Ann Findlay, The Coromandel, 1921–24 by Joanna Orwin (2007)
- Be Counted!: The Diary of Amy Phelps, Dunedin, 1893 by Janine McVeagh (2007)
- Land of Promise: The Diary of William Donahue, Gravesend to Wellington, 1839–40 by Lorraine Orman (2008)
- Sabotage!: The Diary of Rowan Webb, Auckland, 1985 by Sharon Holt (2008) [Retitled Rainbow Warrior: Auckland, 1985 in 2015
- Poor Man's Gold: The Diary of Reuben Radcliffe, Northland, 1899–1900 by Kath Beattie (2008) [Retitled Gumdigger: Northland 1899–1900 in 2011
- "The Mine’s Afire!": The Journal of Tommy Carter, Brunnerton, 1896 by Susan Battye (2009)
- No Survivors: The Diary of Jackie Simms, Hamilton, 1979 by Sharon Holt (2009)
- Pandemic: Spanish Flu, 1918 by Sally Stone (2012)
- Cyclone Bola: Gisborne, 1988 by Kath Beattie (2013)
- Cup Magic: Auckland/San Diego 1995 by Susan Battye (2013)
- Canterbury Quake: Christchurch 2010–11 by Desna Wallace (2014)
- Lighthouse Family: Coastal New Zealand, 1941–42 by Philippa Werry (2013)
- Harbour Bridge: Auckland, 1958–59 by Philippa Werry (2014)
- Bastion Point: 507 Days on Takaparawha: Auckland, 1977-78 by Tania Roxborogh (2017)
- Dawn Raid by Pauline (Vaeluaga) Smith (2018)

== See also ==
- Dear America
- Dear Canada
- I Am Canada
- My Story (UK)
- My Australian Story
