= Esther Glen Award =

New Zealand children's literature award

The Esther Glen Award, or LIANZA Esther Glen Junior Fiction Award, is the longest running and the most renowned literary prize for New Zealand children's literature.

== History ==
The prize was called into being in memory of New Zealand writer Alice Esther Glen (1881–1940) who was the first notable author of children's books there. It has been awarded yearly (with some exceptions) since 1945 by the Library and Information Association of New Zealand Aotearoa (LIANZA) to a New Zealand author "for the most distinguished contribution to New Zealand literature for junior fiction".

== Laureates ==
- 1945: Stella Morice, The Book of Wiremu
- 1947: A. W. Reed, Myths and Legends of Maoriland
- 1950: Joan Smith, The Adventures of Nimble, Rumble and Tumble
- 1959: Maurice Duggan, Falter Tom and the Water Boy
- 1964: Lesley C. Powell, Turi, The Story of a Little Boy
- 1970: Margaret Mahy, A Lion in the Meadow
- 1973: Margaret Mahy, The First Margaret Mahy Story Book
- 1975: Eve Sutton and Lynley Dodd, My Cat Likes to Hide in Boxes
- 1978: Ronda Armitage, The Lighthouse Keeper’s Lunch
- 1979: Joan de Hamel, Take the Long Path
- 1982: Katherine O’Brien, The Year of the Yelvertons
- 1983: Margaret Mahy, The Haunting
- 1984: Caroline Macdonald, Elephant Rock
- 1985: Margaret Mahy, The Changeover
- 1986: Maurice Gee, Motherstone
- 1988: Tessa Duder, Alex
- 1989: Jack Lasenby, The Mangrove Summer
- 1990: Tessa Duder, Alex in Winter
- 1991: William Taylor, Agnes the Sheep
- 1992: Tessa Duder, Alessandra: Alex in Rome
- 1993: Margaret Mahy, Underrunners
- 1994: Paula Boock, Sasscat to Win
- 1995: Maurice Gee, The Fat Man
- 1996: Janice Marriott, Crossroads
- 1997: Kate De Goldi, Sanctuary
- 1998: David Hill, Fat, four-eyed and useless
- 2001: Margaret Mahy, 24 Hours
- 2002: Alison Robertson, Knocked For Six
- 2003: David Hill, Right where it hurts
- 2004: Ken Catran, Jacko Moran, sniper
- 2005: Bernard Beckett, Malcolm and Juliet
- 2006: Elizabeth Knox, Dreamhunter
- 2007: Bernard Beckett, Genesis: A Novel
- 2008: Mandy Hager, Smashed
- 2009: Fleur Beale, Juno of Taris
- 2010: Richard Newsome, The Billionaire’s Curse
- 2011: Diana Menefy, Shadow of the Boyd
- 2012: Barbara Else, The travelling restaurant
- 2013: Rachael King, Red Rocks
- 2014: Joy Cowley, Dunger
- 2015: Leonie Agnew, Conrad Cooper's last stand
- 2016: Kate De Goldi, From the Cutting Room of Barney Kettle
- 2017: Tania Roxborogh, My New Zealand Story: Bastion Point
- 2018: Bren MacDibble, How to Bee
- 2019: Bren MacDibble, The Dog Runner
- 2020: Weng Wai Chan, Lizard's Tale
- 2021: Tania Roxborogh, Charile Tangaroa and the Creature from the Sea
- 2022: Leonie Agnew, The Memory Thief
- 2023: David Hill, Below
- 2024: Stacy Gregg, Nine Girls
- 2025: Li Chen, Detective Beans and the Case of the Missing Hat
- 2026: Graci Kim, Dreamslinger

== See also ==
- List of New Zealand literary awards
