= Cath Mayo =

New Zealand author

- Occupation: Writer
- Website: catherinemayoauthor.com

Cath Mayo is a children's, young adults' and adult novelist, short story writer and musician with a special interest in Greek myths and legends and Late Bronze Age prehistory. She lives in Auckland, New Zealand.

== Biography ==
Cath (Catherine) Mayo grew up in Auckland, New Zealand. Books were an important part of her childhood and she can remember being captivated by Barbara Leonie Picard’s retelling of The Odyssey of Homer, so much so that she used to act out parts of the story and make up extra scenes herself. Two other favourite historical authors were Rosemary Sutcliff and Mary Renault.

She went on to study a wide variety of subjects at the University of Auckland, including history, art history, philosophy, geology, French, music and performance violin. Later she returned to university to study Ancient Greek, so as to be able to read and understand Homer's poetry in more depth, and she has continued to read and learn about the archaeology of Late Bronze Age Greece.

In 1977, she began an apprenticeship in violin-making and restoration. She trained overseas with world-renowned luthiers Vahakn Nigogosian and Christoph Gotting and works as a luthier (a violin maker and restorer) under her maiden name, Cath Newhook, at The Stringed Instrument Company Limited. During the 1980s, she was a member of the band Gentle Annie which toured Oregon and Alaska in 1980. The band performed alongside Limbs Dance Company in Los Angeles in 1986 and at the World Expo in Brisbane in 1988. It played many live shows and appeared as a feature act and as backing vocal group on the television programme That's Country. Cath won the Australian national bluegrass fiddle championship at the Tamworth Country Music Festival in January 1983. She co-wrote and performed a piece of music for the opening ceremony of the Auckland Commonwealth Games in 1990, and has played and recorded with singer songwriter Al Hunter and The 1932 Jazz Orchestra.

When she began to write, her interest in the overlap between history and legends led to fictional re-imaginings of Late Bronze Age Greece, around the time of the Trojan War, featuring the Greek hero Odysseus. She has been to Greece three times, has written about some of her travels there and continues to be fascinated by the layers of history visible in the ancient sites and buildings.

She has won prizes in several short story competitions and was mentored during the writing of her first book by New Zealand author William Taylor. Some of her work has been published in the New Zealand School Journal.

In 2014 she spoke at Victoria University of Wellington's Athens to Aotearoa conference, looking from a writer's perspective at Classical Greek influences in New Zealand. In 2016 she presented a paper at the IBBY Conference in Auckland, titled A Reader's odyssey: parallel journeys on the far side of the world; this covered the parallels between Homer's world and traditional Maori and Polynesian culture. Her novel Athena's Champion, co-written with David Hair, is the first in a series of adult fantasy novels, set in Ancient Greece, in which Odysseus again features as the main character.

== Awards and prizes ==
Cath Mayo was shortlisted for the Storylines Tom Fitzgibbon Award in 2008.

Her first book, Murder at Mykenai, which focuses on Odysseus and Menelaos as teenagers, received a Storylines Notable Book Award for Young Adult Fiction in 2014.

== Bibliography ==
- Murder at Mykenai (Walker Books, 2013)
- The Bow (Walker Books, 2014)

The Olympus series: adult fantasy series, co-written with David Hair:

- Athena’s Champion (Canelo, 2018)
- Oracle's War (Canelo, 2019)
- Sacred Bride (Canelo, 2019)
