= Fifi Colston =

British-born New Zealand writer

- Born: 5 July 1960 (age 66); York, England
- Occupations: Artist; Author; Television presenter
- Notable credit: Good Morning

Fifi Colston (born 5 July 1960) is a writer, illustrator, poet, wearable arts designer, costume and props maker for the film industry and television presenter. She has written or illustrated over 30 books and is also a veteran entrant, finalist and winner in the World of Wearable Art Competition. She lives in Wellington, New Zealand.

== Biography ==
Fifi (Fiona) Colston was born in 1960 in York, England. She emigrated to New Zealand by ship with her family in 1968. Her favourite subject at school was art, and even as a small child, she used to copy out illustrations from her most loved book, The Silver Thimble Story Book.

She completed a Diploma of Visual Communications Design 1980 at Wellington Polytechnic Design School. She then moved to Christchurch and for many years, she presented arts and crafts on the children's television programme What Now and on the Good Morning Show. As a working mother, Colston started using her wry sense of humour and expressed it as witty poetry and illustration in a regular column for Next magazine.

After returning to Wellington, she graduated in 2004 with an MA in Scriptwriting from the International Institute of Modern Letters at Victoria University of Wellington. As part of her MA studies, Colston worked as a scriptwriter for Weta Workshop on the animated series Jane and the Dragon. She also worked for them on The Lion, the Witch and the Wardrobe in 2004 and as a costume illustrator for The Hobbit in 2010.

Her published work includes illustrations for trade and educational publishers, including more than 30 books. Colston was a judge for the 2008 New Zealand Post Book Awards. She has served as President of the New Zealand Illustrators' Guild, Wellington committee member for the Storylines Festival, convener of the Wellington Children's Book Association and co-convenor of Spinning Gold, the Children's Book Writers and Illustrators Conference held in Wellington in 2009. With a group of other writers, she began an online writing initiative for children called FABO Story and she often runs creative writing, illustrating and wearable arts workshops for schools.

Nearly every year since 1995, she has submitted one or even two garments for the World of Wearable Art competition and has been a finalist many times. Her creation Lady Curiosity (inspired by Rachael King’s novel Magpie Hall) won third place in the Avant Garde Section of the 2010 Awards, and in 2017, her piece The Organ Farmer won the Weta Workshop Science Fiction award. Her work has been exhibited many times in the World of Wearable Art Museum in Nelson, and some of her pieces have toured New Zealand and overseas in WOW travelling exhibitions.

In 2018 she took part in The Big Hoot, a fundraiser for Child Cancer Foundation, and she won the Fantastical Shoe section in the 2018 Shoes Extravaganza shoe design competition.

She is married with two adult children and lives in Wellington, New Zealand.

== Awards and residencies ==
Several of Colston's books have been shortlisted for or have won awards or been named as Storylines Notable Books. She was a finalist in the Esther Glen Award 2010 for Glory, in the New Zealand Post Children's Book Awards 2014 (Non fiction) for Wearable Wonders, in the New Zealand Children's Book Awards 2015 for Ghoulish Get Ups and in the Elsie Locke Award for Non-Fiction in the New Zealand Book Awards for Children and Young Adults 2017 with Torty and the Soldier. She won the 2014 LIANZA Elsie Locke Non-Fiction Award for Wearable Wonders.

Her YA novel Wild Cards was shortlisted for the 2016 Storylines Tessa Duder Award.

In 2019, she was named as the University of Otago College of Education/Creative New Zealand Children's Writer in Residence.

== Bibliography ==
Writer/ Illustrator

Fifi's Crafty Arts (Ashton Scholastic, 1995)

Fifi's Crafty Arts 2 (Ashton Scholastic, 1995)

Fifi's Festive Fun (Ashton Scholastic, 1995)

Verity's Truth (Scholastic, 2003)

Janie Olive: A Recipe for Disaster! (Scholastic, 2005)

Glory (Scholastic, 2009)

Wearable Wonders (Scholastic, 2013)

Ghoulish Get Ups (Scholastic, 2014)

Writer

Masher (Puffin, 2022)

Illustrator

Old Man and the Cat by Anthony Holcroft (Whitcoulls, 1984)

Rain by Barbara Hill (Ashton Scholastic, 1984)

Oldest Garden in China by Anthony Holcroft (Whitcoulls, 1985)

Mr Magee Came Home for His Tea by Janet Slater Redhead (Ashton Scholastic, 1986)

Not Without Randolph by Ruth Corrin (Ashton Scholastic, 1993)

Midnight Feast by Elizabeth Pulford (Scholastic, 1996)

Get Real Paddy Manson by Ruth Corrin (HarperCollins, 1996)

Toroa text by Te Aorere Riddell; photographs by Brian Gunson (Huia, 2001)

Waka Wairua: The Spirit Waka by Yvonne Morrison (Reed, 2005)

Papa's Island by Melanie Drewery (Reed, 2006)

Itiiti's Gift by Melanie Drewery (Reed, 2006)

The Red Poppy by David Hill (Scholastic, 2012) Published in te reo Māori as Te popi whero.

Far, Far From Home by Elizabeth Pulford (Scholastic, 2012)

Toughen up, Andrew! by Anne Manchester (Submarine, 2016)

Grandad’s Guitar by Janine McVeagh (Makaro Press, 2017)

Torty and the soldier: a story of a true WWI survivor by Jennifer Beck (Scholastic, 2017)

Go, Girl: A Storybook of Epic NZ Women by Barbara Else (Penguin Books, 2018)
