= Orwin =

Orwin is both a surname and a given name. Notable people with the name include:

- Clifford Orwin (born 1947), Canadian academic
- John Orwin (born 1954), English rugby union player
- Joanna Orwin (born 1944), New Zealand writer
- Louise Orwin, British performance artist
- Martin Orwin (born 1963), English linguist and writer
- Orwin Castel (born 1973), Mauritian footballer

== See also ==
- Orwin, Pennsylvania, census-designated place in Schuylkill County, Pennsylvania, United States
