= Ronda Armitage =

English children's writer

Ronda Armitage is a children's writer, teacher and counsellor. She lives in England.

== Biography ==
Ronda Armitage was born in Kaikōura, New Zealand, on 11 March 1943.

She worked as a teacher and is a trained counsellor, but is best known for her many children's books, including the Lighthouse Keeper series, inspired by the Beachy Head lighthouse.

She moved to England in 1974 with her husband David Armitage and two children and now lives in East Sussex. David Armitage has illustrated many of her books.

== Awards and prizes ==
Ronda Armitage's first book (and the first in the Lighthouse Keeper series), The Lighthouse Keeper's Lunch, won the 1978 Esther Glen Award. This title was also named in the booklist for Fifty Favourite Books From The Last Fifty Years by The Federation of Children’s Book Groups.

In 2013, she won the Coventry Inspiration Book Award for A Very Strange Creature.

== Bibliography ==
The Lighthouse Keeper series

The Lighthouse Keeper's Lunch (1977)

The Lighthouse Keeper's Catastrophe (1986)

The Lighthouse Keeper's Rescue (1989)

The Lighthouse Keeper's Picnic (1993)

The Lighthouse Keeper's Cat (1995)

The Lighthouse Keeper's Favourite Stories (1999)

The Lighthouse Keeper's Breakfast (2000)

The Lighthouse Keeper's Tea (2001)

The Lighthouse Keeper's Christmas (2002)

The Lighthouse Keeper's New Friend (2007)

The Lighthouse Keeper's Surprise (2009)

The Lighthouse Keeper's Mystery (2020)

Children's fiction

The Trouble with Mr. Harris (1978)

Don't Forget Matilda! (1979)

The Birthday Spell (1980)

The Bossing of Josie (1980)

Ice Creams for Rosie (1981)

One Moonlit Night (1983)

Grandma Goes Shopping (1984)

When Dad Did the Washing Up (1990)

Watch the Baby, Daisy (1991)

A Quarrel of Koalas (1992)

Looking after Chocolates (1992)

Queen of the Night (1999)

Small Knight and George (2007)

A New Home for a Pirate (2007)

Small Knight and George and the Royal Chocolate Cake (2008)

The Bungle Jungle Bedtime Kiss (2008)

A Very Strange Creature (2009)

Small Knight and George and the Pirates (2012)

Wave the Flag and Blow the Whistle (2012)

A Mighty Bitey Creature (2017)

Children's non fiction

New Zealand (1988)

== See also ==
- List of New Zealand literary awards
