= Genesis (novel) =

2006 novel by Bernard Beckett

- Author: Bernard Beckett
- Language: English
- Genre: Science fiction
- Publisher: Longacre Press
- Publication date: 25 Aug 2006
- Publication place: New Zealand
- Media type: Print (hardcover)
- Pages: 150
- ISBN: 978-1-877-36152-4
- OCLC: 244339669
- Dewey Decimal: 823/.92 22
- LC Class: PR9639.4.B434 G46 2009

Genesis (2006) is a philosophical science fiction novel by New Zealand author Bernard Beckett. It won the 2007 Esther Glen Award for children's literature, and the 2007 New Zealand Post Book Awards for Children and Young Adults. As of 2008 it has been published in 22 countries.

Genesis looks at questions such as the origins of life (hence Genesis), ideas about human consciousness, and the nature of a soul which separates humans from other animals or machines.

Genesis also has been nominated for the 2018 Inaugural Daniel Lim award for best philosophical novel.

== Plot summary ==
The entirety of the novel consists of Anaximander, a new candidate for The academy, participating in a gruelling auditory entrance exam. The academy consists of the most elite class in society and plays an influential role in the lives of all living on the island Republic. Therefore, it is little wonder that Anaximander would be enthusiastic over such an opportunity and consequently spend large amounts of time preparing with her tutor Pericles. Her chosen area of expertise, which she will be questioned over, is on the life of her long-dead hero Adam Forde. As the exam progresses, the reader is granted much insight into the history of the Republic, information that is integral to understanding the significance of Adam Forde's life. Anaximander explains how, beginning in 2030, early attempts at genetic engineering created widespread fear throughout the world. The United States entered a war with the Middle East that could not be won in an attempt to spread democratic ideals that fit poorly with the native culture of the country. Europe at this time was viewed as having lost its morality, and China's rise in power led to a fear that a global conflict loomed. In the midst of such global turmoil, a worldwide plague developed, and the island Republic formed, isolating citizens completely from outside contact. All living on the island were consequently safe but not free.

Adam Forde is the first to act against the extensive security measures. He spots a young girl in a small battered boat that narrowly avoids the explosives placed in the surrounding ocean and, in an act of compassion, rescues and protects her against assassination. He is consequently thrown in prison and is sentenced to participate in an experiment involving artificial intelligence developed by a respected leader of the Republic, Philosopher William. William wished that the android's education be furthered after his death, and Adam complied knowing that it was his only opportunity to avoid public execution. Anaximander gives an extremely detailed account of the interactions between Adam and Art, the android. The conversations she recites illustrate Adam's reluctance to develop and converse with artificial intelligence, as he believes it lacks personhood.

Anaximander encounters numerous Socratic lectures in which she arrives at a greater understanding of the reasoning behind Adam's actions and the true extent of Art's intelligence and being. In the end, The Final Dilemma, accurately revealed by the examiners, answers Adam's question of Art's identity far better than any of Anaximander's well-developed speculations. A never before released hologram shows Art acting upon the free will to self-replicate and kill a conscious being, Adam. As Anaximander is experiencing history redefining itself through these explanations, the reader learns that the examiners, Pericles, and Anaximander herself are all replications of Art's orangutan being. The examiners sadly reveal that the academy never accepts new applicants and that the examination is a way to control the “virus” that Anaximander is subject to. The virus is found in all candidates that find a particular interest in Adam Forde's life and allows the infected orangs, another name for Art–like androids, the ability to understand the extent of free will these mechanical beings possess. In a final act to control the virus, Pericles enters the examination rooms and breaks Anaximander's neck, disconnecting her for the final time.
