= Pauline Cartwright =

New Zealand children's writer

- Born: 14 July 1944 (age 82); Lawrence, New Zealand
- Occupation: Writer

Pauline Cartwright is a writer of novels, picture books, stories and poems for children. She was awarded the Choysa Bursary in 1991 and the University of Otago College of Education / Creative New Zealand Children's Writer in Residence Fellowship in 2003. She lives in Alexandra, New Zealand.

== Biography ==
Pauline Cartwright was born on 14 July 1944 in Lawrence, Otago. She attended Weston School in Oamaru and dreamed of being a writer from the age of nine.

She lists some of her favourite childhood reading as The Magic Trumpet by Elizabeth Durack and Mary Durack, and books by L.M. Montgomery, Paul Gallico and Noel Streatfeild.

Her work includes novels, stories, picture books, poetry and magazine articles as well as stories broadcast on radio. She has written many educational readers for publishers such as Learning Media, Gilt Edge Publishing, Macmillan Education Australia, Nelson Price Milburn, Shortland Publications and Wendy Pye Publishing, Her books Grow a Gift and Saved by Ryan Kane were shortlisted for the New Zealand Book Awards for Children and Young Adults. Inside the Game, which appeared in 2009, was her 300th title to be published.

She visits schools as part of the New Zealand Book Council Writers in Schools programme.

She lives in Alexandra, Central Otago.

== Awards and Prizes ==
Arthur and the Dragon, illustrated by David Elliot, won the Russell Clark Award for Illustration in 1991.

In 1991, Pauline Cartwright was awarded the Choysa / QE11 Arts Council Bursary for Children's Writers.

In 2003, she shared the University of Otago College of Education / Creative New Zealand Children’s Writer in Residence with David Hill.

== Bibliography ==
Pet Day, ill. Kimbra Taylor (Price Milburn, 1987)

What Is It Like To Be Old?, ill. Heather Busch (Highgate/Price Milburn, 1988)

Arthur and the Dragon, ill. David Elliot (Nelson Price Milburn, 1990)

Grow a Gift, illustrated by Jill Parry (Nelson Price Milburn, 1991)

Selina : the cat who saw the sea-- unintentionally, ill. Rex Thompson (Ashton Scholastic, 1991)

How Dictionaries Came To Be, ill. Pat Reynolds (Nelson Price Milburn, 1992)

A Dog for Keeps, ill. Lyn Kriegler (Ashton Scholastic, 1992)

Matau: the giant of Wakatipu, ill. Te Maari Gardiner (Ashton Scholastic, 1992)

What! No TV? (Ashton Scholastic, 1993)

Heroes Last Summer (HarperCollins, 1993)

The Reluctant Pirate, ill. Marg Hamilton (Angus & Robertson, 1993)

The Praying Mantis (Learning Media, 1993)

Saved by Ryan Kane (Ashton Scholastic, 1994)

Ten Happy Dinosaurs (Ashton Scholastic, 1994)

Sam 'n' Tommy and the Snakeman, ill. Lyn Kriegler (HarperCollins Publishers N.Z., 1994)

Kahukura and the sea fairies, ill. Te Maari Gardiner (Ashton Scholastic, 1994)

If you're an apple you can't be a banana, ill. Marg Hamilton (Longacre Press, 1995)

Princess Jacinda, ill. Tim Tripp (Longacre Press, 1995)

Why isn't a Cow Called a Meringue? illustrated by Trevor Pye (Hazard Press, 1995)

All Sorts of Trucks (Bridge Hill Pub., 1998)

Kopuwai the Water Swallower, ill. Phillip Paea (Scholastic, 1998)

Pouakai the man-eater, ill. Phillip Paea (Scholastic, 1998)

Big Farm Machines (Bridge Hill, 2000)

Escape! ill. Lorenzo van der Lingen (Harper Collins, 2003)

Finding Father: The Journal of Mary Brogan, Otago, 1862 (My Story series) (Scholastic, 2004) Retitled Gold: Otago, 1862 in 2010

Survive: Night Rescue (Scholastic, 2005)

The Cross Feeling ill. Annabel Craighead (Scholastic, 2007)

Inside the Game (Pearson Heinemann, 2009)
