= Brigid Lowry =

New Zealand author

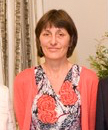
- Lowry in 2008
- Born: 25 March 1953 (age 73); Auckland, New Zealand
- Education: Auckland Teachers College, Curtin University, University of Western Australia
- Occupation: Author
- Writing career
- Language: English
- Genres: Children's author, young adult
- Notable awards: Avis Page Award, Young Adult Fiction (New Zealand Book Awards for Children and Young Adults), Victorian Premier's Prize for Young Adult Fiction

Brigid Lowry (born 25 March 1953) is a New Zealand author.

== Background ==
Lowry was born in 1953 in Auckland, New Zealand. She has a diploma of teaching from Auckland Teachers College (1973), BA in English from Curtin University, a postgraduate diploma of English literature, and an MA in creative writing from the University of Western Australia. Lowry has lived for some time in Australia, returning to live in Nelson, New Zealand from 2000 to 2010. She currently resides in Perth, Western Australia.

== Career ==
Lowry is primarily a children's and young adult author, she has also published poetry and short stories. She became a professional writer in 1985 and also teaches creative writing.

Lowry has been published in Western Word, Far & Wide, Southern Review, Imago, Western Word Magazine, Mind Moon Circle, Fremantle Arts Review, Speculum Magazine, Naked Eye, Westerly Magazine and Australian Book Review.

== Awards ==
Guitar Highway Rose won the 1999 Avis Page Award in the West Australian Young Readers' Book Awards and was shortlisted for the 1998 Children's Book Council of Australia Readers Book of the Year (Older Readers). It was also shortlisted in the 2006 LIANZA Esther Glen Junior Fiction Award.

In 2006 With Lots of Love from Georgia won the Young Adult Fiction category at the New Zealand Book Awards for Children and Young Adults, and was included in the 2006 Storylines Notable Young Adult Fiction Book list.

Tomorrow All Will Be Beautiful won the 2008 Victorian Premier's Prize for Young Adult Fiction and was a finalist in the Young Adult Fiction category at the New Zealand Book Awards for Children and Young Adults.

Juicy Writing: Inspiration and Techniques for Young Writers was included in the 2009 Storylines Notable Non-Fiction Book list and was shortlisted in the non-fiction category in the 2009 New Zealand Post Children's Book Awards.

Lowry received the 2008 Grimshaw Sargeson Fellowship with Paula Morris. In 2004 she was the University of Otago College of Education Creative New Zealand Children's Writer in Residence. In February 2017, Lowry was the visiting writer at the Michael King Writers Centre.

== Published works ==
- Fizz, Max & Me (1993, Pan Australia)
- Guitar Highway Rose (1996, Allen and Unwin, reissued in 2004)
- Follow the Blue (2001, Allen and Unwin)
- Spacecamp (2002, Allen and Unwin), co-authored with son, Sam Field
- With Lots of Love from Georgia (2005, Allen and Unwin)
- Tomorrow All Will Be Beautiful (2007, Allen & Unwin)
- Juicy Writing: Inspiration and Techniques for Young Writers (2008, Allen & Unwin), non-fiction
- Triple Ripple (2011, Allen and Unwin)
- Still Life with Teapot: On Zen, Memoir and Creativity (2016, Fremantle Press), memoir
- A Year of Loving Kindess To Myself and other essays. (2021, Fremantle Press), memoir
