= Jillian Sullivan =

New Zealand writer

- Born: 1957 (age 68–69) Masterton, New Zealand
- Occupation: Writer

Website
- jilliansullivan.co.nz

Jillian Sullivan is a writer of fiction, non-fiction, and poetry and a creative writing teacher. Her work has been published in New Zealand and overseas.

== Biography ==
Jillian Sullivan was born in Masterton in 1957.

She has written novels and short stories for adults, children and teenagers, as well as creative non-fiction and poetry. Her work has been included in anthologies and published in journals such as Landfall, Takahē, North and South and Headland. She was awarded a Master of Creative Writing, with Distinction, at Massey University in 2011.

After living in Nelson for many years, she moved to Oturehua in Central Otago. Her memoir A Way Home relates the story of how she achieved her dream to build a straw-bale house.

She runs workshops at literary festivals and teaches creative writing in New Zealand, in Rosemont College, Philadelphia and at the Highlights Foundation, Pennsylvania.

She has five children and nine grandchildren and worked part-time for several years as a nurse aid at the Maniototo Hospital.

== Awards and Prizes ==
Jillian Sullivan was runner-up in the 2002 Sunday Star Times Short Story Competition. She won the Tom Fitzgibbon Award in 2003 and the Maurice Gee Prize for Children’s Writing in 2005.

She won the Kathleen Grattan Prize for a Sequence of Poems in 2011 - this later leading to the publication of her book parallel, as well as the 2016 Takahē Poetry Competition with her poem 'My Mother at the Edge of Town'.

In 2017 she was awarded the New Zealand Society of Authors Peter & Dianne Beatson Fellowship to work on a collection of creative non-fiction essays with a conservation theme.

In 2018, she won the Juncture Memoir Contest in America with her essay ‘Between Lands’, and her essay ‘In the Midst of My True Life’ won the Best Non-fiction Bonus Prize in the 2018 Elyne Mitchell Writing Awards. She was highly commended in the 2018 Warren Trust Awards for Architectural Writing.

== Bibliography ==
Creative Non-fiction

A Way Home - building a new life and a strawbale house in Central Otago (Potton and Burton, 2016)

Fishing from the Boat Ramp - A Guide to Creating (Steele Roberts, 2009) Also published as an e-book: A Guide to Creating

Poetry

parallel (Steele Roberts, 2014)

Children’s novels

Shreve's Promise (Scholastic, 2004) - winner of the Tom Fitzgibbon Award in 2003

What About Bo? (Scholastic, 2005) - named in the Storylines Notable Book Awards 2006

Silverstream (Pearson NZ, 2008)

Short stories

Hey Tony (Orchard Press, 1999)

Launched and Other Stories (Pearson Education NZ, 2005)

Mythology

Myths and Legends – The Gift of Stories from Our Cultures (Pearson Education NZ, 2007)
