= Lorraine Orman =

New Zealand writer and reviewer

- Born: 24 November 1948 (age 77) Auckland, New Zealand
- Occupation: Writer

Lorraine Orman (born 24 November 1948) is a New Zealand writer, librarian, writing tutor, competition judge and reviewer. She has written books for children and young adults and a number of her short stories have been anthologised. Her novel Cross Tides won the Best First Book Award at the New Zealand Post Children's Book Awards in 2005. She lives in Christchurch.

== Biography ==
Lorraine Orman was born on 24 November 1948 in Auckland. She studied for a Bachelor of Arts at the University of Auckland, followed by a post-graduate diploma of librarianship in Wellington. Her library career included jobs at the National Library and school and tertiary institution libraries.

With a young family, she began to write short stories for children, the first of which was published in the New Zealand School Journal in 1982. Since then, her stories have been included in anthologies and broadcast on National Radio.

She was involved with the Storylines Foundation for many years. With Tessa Duder, and on behalf of IBBY (International Board on Books for Young People) and the Storylines Foundation, she edited an anthology of short stories to celebrate International Children’s Book Day in 2007.

She was a judge for the New Zealand Post Children's and Young Adults' Book Awards in 2004 and has also acted as a judge for the LIANZA Awards, the Tessa Duder Award and the Tom Fitzgibbon Award.

She reviewed children’s books for writing blogs and Magpies magazine and ran many courses and workshops on writing for children.

After living for many years in Warkworth, Lorraine Orman moved to Christchurch with her husband in 2018 to be closer to family. She has five grandchildren.

== Early life and education ==
Lorraine Orman was born in 1948 in New Zealand and developed an early interest in reading and storytelling. She studied English and library science at the University of Auckland, where she became involved in children’s literature and educational publishing. Her background in librarianship later influenced her writing, particularly her focus on stories for young readers and contributions to school publications.

== Awards and prizes ==
Orman won the New Zealand Post Children's Book Awards Best First Book Award 2005 for Cross Tides. Several of her other books have been named as Storylines Notable Books.

== Publications ==
=== Books ===
- Cross Tides (Longacre Press, 2004)
- Kev and Borax illustrated by Mitch Vane [Aussie Bites] (Puffin, 2005)
- A Long Way from Home: The Diary of Lillian Glenmore, Warkworth, 1943 [My Story series] (Scholastic 2005); reissued in 2012 as Here Come the Marines
- Ratso illustrated by Dave Gunson [Kiwi Bites] (Puffin 2005)
- Furze the Fixer illustrated by Trevor Pye [Kiwi Bites] (Puffin 2005)
- Fish Tale illustrated by Lara Gazzard [Kiwi Bites] (Puffin, 2006)
- Hideout (Longacre Press, 2007)
- Out of the Deep and Other Stories from New Zealand and the Pacific co-editor with Tessa Duder; illustrated by Bruce Potter (Reed 2007)
- Land of Promise: The Diary of William Donahue, Gravesend to Wellington, 1839-40 [My Story series] (Scholastic NZ, 2008)
- Haunted (Walker Books, 2009)
- Touchstone (Asmore Books 2013; e-book format)

=== Short stories in anthologies ===
- The Puffin New Zealand Storybook (2nd ed, Puffin, 1996)
- Animal Stories for 9-year-olds (Macmillan, 1999)
- 30 Weird and Wonderful New Zealand Stories (Random House NZ, 2003)
- Claws and Jaws: 30 New Zealand Animal Stories (Random House NZ, 2004)
- Mischief & Mayhem: 30 New Zealand Stories (Random House NZ, 2005)
- Hideous & Hilarious: 30 New Zealand Historical Stories (Random House NZ, 2006)
- Dare & Double Dare: 30 New Zealand Sporty Stories (Random House NZ, 2007)
- The Puffin Treasury of New Zealand Children’s Stories, vol. 4 (Puffin, 2007)
- Pick ‘n’ Mix: Assorted Kiwi Stories, vol. 2 (Scholastic NZ, 2010)
