= David Hair =

New Zealand fantasy author

- Born: Hawke's Bay, New Zealand
- Occupation: Writer
- Writing career
- Genre: Fantasy
- Notable works: Aoteaora; The Return of Ravana; The Moontide Quartet; The Sunsurge Quartet

David Hair is a writer from New Zealand who has written four fantasy series: Aotearoa, The Return of Ravana, The Moontide Quartet (all for young adult readers, except The Moontide Quartet) and his latest, which incorporates adult themes, The Sunsurge Quartet. His first novel, The Bone Tiki, was published in 2009.

Hair was born in Hawke's Bay and spent his working life in the financial service sector in Wellington.

== Bibliography ==
=== The Aotearoa series ===
- The Bone Tiki (2011) (Winner of the best first book award, New Zealand Post Children's Book Awards)
- The Taniwha's Tear (2010)
- The Lost Tohunga (2012)
- Justice and Utu (2012)
- Ghosts of Parihaka (2013)
- Magic and Makutu (2014)

=== The Return of Ravana series ===
- Pyre of Queens (aka The Pyre) (2011)
- Swayamvara (The Ghost Bride) (aka The Adversaries) (2011)
- Souls in Exile (aka The Exile) (2011)
- King of Lanka (aka The King) (2012)

=== The Moontide Quartet ===
- Mage's Blood (2012)
- Scarlet Tides (2013)
- Unholy War (2014)
- Ascendant's Rite (2015)

=== The Sunsurge Quartet ===
- Empress of the Fall (2017)
- Prince of the Spear (2018)
- Hearts of Ice (2019)
- Mother of Daemons (2020)

=== Olympus Trilogy ===
(with Cath Mayo)

- Athena's Champion (2018)
- Oracle's War (2019)
- Sacred Bride (2019)

=== Tethered Citadel ===
- Map's Edge (2020)
- World's Edge (2021)
- Sorcerer's Edge (2022)
