= List of New Zealand literary awards =

Current and historic literary awards in New Zealand include:

Name of award	Description	Type of award	Established
Adam Foundation Prize in Creative Writing	Awarded annually for the best creative writing portfolio at the International Institute of Modern Letters at Victoria University of Wellington.	University prize	1996
Adam NZ Play Award (previously the Playmarket New New Zealand Play Award)	Awarded annually to new plays in categories including Best New Play, Best Play by a Māori Playwright, Best Play by a Woman and Best Play by a Pasifika Playwright. New categories include the McNaughton South Island Play Award (as of 2020, for a play written by a South Island resident) and the Dean Parker Adaptation or Non-fiction Award (as of 2021, for a play adapted from a fictional work, or a docudrama or verbatim work).	Plays	2008
Antarctica New Zealand Community Engagement Programme (previously the Artists to Antarctica programme)	Annual programme providing travel to Antarctica, accommodation at Scott Base and support for artists, teachers and writers who present "innovative Community Engagement proposals which align to Antarctica New Zealand's purpose". Superseded the Artists to Antarctica Programme which ran intermittently from 1957 to 1992 and annually from 1997 to 2014.	Fellowship or residency	2014
Anzac Bridge Fellowship	Awarded annually to creative practitioners of any kind, who are invited to make a project proposal that explores issues of war, peace, loss, memory, and identity, and that involves the participation of the nearby communities. The award involves a three-week fellowship and the artist is asked to contribute to or enrich the annual ANZAC memorial service held at the ANZAC Memorial Bridge, Wairarapa.	Fellowship or residency	2006
Arts Foundation of New Zealand Laureate Awards	Awarded annually by the Arts Foundation of New Zealand to up to ten of New Zealand's most outstanding practising artists. The Laureate awards include the Te Moana-nui-a-Kiwa Award (for outstanding Māori and Pasifika creatives) and the Theresa Gattung Female Arts Practitioners Award (for outstanding female creatives).	General creative arts	2000
Arts Foundation of New Zealand Icon Awards	Awarded by the Arts Foundation of New Zealand to a limited circle of 20 living artists for lifetime achievement.	Lifetime achievement	2003
Arts Foundation of New Zealand Springboard Awards	Awarded annually by the Arts Foundation of New Zealand to up to six artists at a formative stage of their career, and includes a NZ$15,000 award as well as a partnership with a senior artist mentor.	General creative arts	2020
Arts Pasifika Awards	Awarded annually to Pasifika artists across all artforms by Creative New Zealand.	Pasifika creative arts	1996
Bert Roth Award for Labour History	Awarded annually by the Labour History Project to the work that best depicts the history of work and resistance in New Zealand, in memory of Bert Roth.	History	2013
Betty Gilderdale Award (previously known as the Children's Literature Association's Award for Services to Children's Literature)	Awarded annually by the Storylines Children's Literature Charitable Trust for outstanding service to children's literature and literacy.	Children's literature	1990
Bruce Jesson Journalism Awards	Awarded annually for "critical, informed, analytical and creative journalism or writing which will contribute to public debate in New Zealand on an important issue or issues", in memory of journalist Bruce Jesson. The awards offered are the Bruce Jesson Senior Journalism Grant (since 2004, up to NZ$4,000) and the Bruce Jesson Emerging Journalism Prize (since 2009, up to NZ$1,000).	Journalism	2004
Bruce Mason Playwriting Award	Awarded annually to recognise the work of an outstanding emerging New Zealand playwright, in memory of Bruce Mason.	Plays	1983
CLNZ/NZSA Writers' Award (previously known as the CLNZ Writers' Award)	Awarded annually by Copyright Licensing New Zealand and the New Zealand Society of Authors to non-fiction writers to enable the recipient to devote time to a specific writing project, in the amount of NZ$25,000.	Non-fiction	2011
Creative New Zealand Berlin Writers' Residency	Awarded biennially by Creative New Zealand to an established writer to work on an approved project for up to eleven months in Berlin, including travel, accommodation and expenses.	Fellowship or residency	2000
Creative New Zealand Michael King Writers' Fellowship	Awarded biennially by Creative New Zealand to authors who have a significant body of published work, to support their work on a major project over two or more years. The fellowship is valued at NZ$100,000.	Fellowship or residency	2003
Dan Davin Literary Foundation Annual Writing Awards	Awarded annually to writers in the Southland or Otago regions, by the Dan Davin Literary Foundation. The Dan Davin Award is presented to adults and alternates between poetry and short stories each year. The Junior and U19/Senior Student Awards are presented to students.	Short stories Poetry	1995
Dan Davin Literary Foundation Writer in Residence	Awarded biennially by the Dan Davin Literary Foundation to established short-story writers who undertake a 6-week residency in Southland.	Fellowship or residency	2019
DANZ Children's Book Award	Awarded biennially by the Australian School Library Association and the School Library Association of New Zealand Aotearoa for picture books, chapter books and middle grade books.	Children's literature	2024
David Carson-Parker Embassy Prize in Scriptwriting	Awarded annually to the writer of the best folio project in the scriptwriting major of the MA in creative writing at Victoria University of Wellington.	University prize	1996
Elsie Locke Award for Non-Fiction (previously known as the LIANZA Elsie Locke Non-Fiction Award and the LIANZA Young People's Non-Fiction Award)	Awarded annually to the best non-fiction writing for young New Zealanders, since 2016 as part of the New Zealand Book Awards for Children and Young Adults.	Children's literature	1986
Esther Glen Award	Awarded annually by LIANZA to a New Zealand author "for the most distinguished contribution to New Zealand literature for junior fiction". Since 2016 has been awarded as part of the New Zealand Book Awards for Children and Young Adults.	Children's literature	1945
Fulbright-Creative New Zealand Pacific Writer's Residency	Awarded annually by the Fulbright Program and Creative New Zealand to a mid-career or senior New Zealand writer of Pacific heritage. For a duration of three months, it supports work on a creative writing project exploring Pacific identity, culture or history at the University of Hawaiʻi.	Fellowship or residency	2004
Grimshaw Sargeson Fellowship (previously known as the Buddle Findlay Sargeson Fellowship or the Sargeson Fellowship)	Awarded annually to published New Zealand writers, with an annual stipend of NZ$20,000 and use of the Sargeson Centre near the University of Auckland. Established in memory of Frank Sargeson.	Fellowship or residency	1987
Harriet Friedlander Residency	Awarded biennially to a New Zealand artist (of any discipline) who is sent to experience New York City with NZ$100,000 to cover living expenses.	Fellowship or residency	2009
Janet Frame Prize	Awarded biennially by the Janet Frame Literary Trust for fiction, poetry and literary organisation.	Fiction, poetry, literary organisation	2005
Joy Cowley Award	Awarded annually by the Storylines Children's Literature Charitable Trust for an original picture book.	Children's literature	2003
Katherine Mansfield Menton Fellowship (previously known as the New Zealand Post Katherine Mansfield Prize and the Meridian Energy Katherine Mansfield Memorial Fellowship)	Awarded annually by the Arts Foundation of New Zealand, with the support of the Winn-Manson Menton Trust, to established New Zealand writers. Recipients are given funding towards transport to and accommodation in Menton, France, where Mansfield did some of her best-known and most significant writing. A room is available in the Villa Isola Bella for use as a study.	Fellowship or residency	1970
Kathleen Grattan Award	Awarded biennially by the University of Otago for an original book-length collection of poems by a New Zealand or South Pacific permanent resident or citizen, in memory of Auckland poet Kathleen Grattan.	Poetry	2008
Kathleen Grattan Prize for a Sequence of Poems	Awarded annually by the International Writers' Workshop (New Zealand) for a cycle or sequence of poems that has a common link or theme.	Poetry	2009
Landfall Essay Competition	Awarded annually to an essay by literary journal Landfall and judged each year by the current editor.	Essays	2009
Louis Johnson New Writer's Bursary	Awarded annually by Creative New Zealand to enable a published writer or playwright at an early stage of their career to work on a new project.	General writing	2010
Lilian Ida Smith Award	Awarded every three years by the New Zealand Society of Authors. Named for Lilian Ida Smith, a Whanganui music teacher, who left a legacy to the Society to "assist people aged 35 years and over to embark upon or further a literary career". Recipients must be over 35 and in the early stages of their writing career.	General writing	1986
Macmillan Brown Prize for Writers	Awarded annually by the University of Canterbury to recognise excellence in English composition by current and recent undergraduate students.	University prize	1965
Margaret Mahy Illustration Prize	Awarded annually by Hachette Aotearoa New Zealand and the Margaret Mahy Estate	Illustration	2019
Margaret Mahy Medal and Lecture Award	Awarded annually by the Storylines Children's Literature Charitable Trust to a person who has made a significant contribution to children's literature, publishing or literacy.	Children's literature	1991
Mary and Peter Biggs Award for Poetry (previously known as the Poetry Award)	Awarded annually at the Ockham New Zealand Book Awards to the winner of the poetry category.	Poetry	1976
Michael King Writers' Centre annual residency programme	Around 20 supported residencies of two to three weeks duration are offered every year to New Zealand writers for nominated projects, with funding from Creative New Zealand.	Fellowship or residency	2005
Michael Gifkins Prize for an Unpublished Novel	Awarded annually by the New Zealand Society of Authors in memory of Michael Gifkins. The recipient receives a publishing contract from Text Publishing and an advance in the value of NZ$10,000.	Fiction	2018
New Zealand Book Awards for Children and Young Adults	Series of literary awards presented annually to recognise excellence in children and young adults' literature in New Zealand. Previously known under various names including s the New Zealand Government Publishing Awards, the AIM Children's Book Awards, and the New Zealand Post Children's Book Awards.	Children's literature	1982
New Zealand Poet Laureate (previously known as the Te Mata Poet Laureate)	Biennial appointment of a poet by the National Library of New Zealand to represent New Zealand's community of poets, to promote and advocate for poetry, and to produce a number of published works during their two-year tenure.	Poetry	1997
Ngā Kupu Ora Māori Journalism Awards (previously known as the Ngā Kupu Ora Māori Book Awards)	Awarded annually by Massey University to mark Te Wiki o te Reo Māori (Māori Language Week) and to recognise and encourage excellence in Māori writing and publishing.	Māori writing	2009
Ngaio Marsh Awards	Literary awards presented annually in New Zealand to recognise excellence in crime fiction, mystery, and thriller writing.	Crime	2010
NZSA Heritage Book Awards	Awarded annually by the New Zealand Society of Authors for books linked to New Zealand's heritage, in categories including heritage fiction and non-fiction, short prose, poetry, children's books, and te reo Māori or bilingual books.	NZ heritage	2013
NZSA Laura Solomon Cuba Press Prize	Awarded annually by the New Zealand Society of Authors for new writing with a "unique and original vision", in memory of author Laura Solomon.	General writing	2020
NZSA Peter & Dianne Beatson Fellowship (known informally as the Foxton or Beatson Fellowship)	Awarded annually to writers of fiction, non-fiction, poetry and drama, who are members of the New Zealand Society of Authors (NZSA) and working on a new project. Comprises an award of NZ$10,000.	General writing	2001
NZSA Waitangi Day Literary Honours	Awarded annually by the New Zealand Society of Authors to celebrate and acknowledge literary success, especially on the international stage.	General writing	2014–2020
Ockham New Zealand Book Awards (previously known as the New Zealand Post Book Awards and the Montana New Zealand Book Awards)	Series of literary awards presented annually. Began as the merger of the New Zealand Book Awards and the Goodman Fielder Wattie Book Awards in 1996. As of 2021, there are five principal prizes: fiction (currently known as the Jann Medlicott Acorn Prize for Fiction), general non-fiction (sponsored by Royal Society Te Apārangi), illustrated non-fiction, poetry (currently known as the Mary and Peter Biggs Award for Poetry) and Te Mūrau o te Tuhi Māori Language Award for books written entirely in te reo Māori. "Best First Book" prizes are awarded to first time authors in the first four categories, currently sponsored by MitoQ.	General writing	1996
Philippine Airlines Travcom Media Awards (previously the Whitcoulls Travcom Travel Book of the Year Awards)	Awarded annually by Travcom (New Zealand Travel Communicators) to celebrate excellence in travel writing, photography and digital media.	Journalism	1992
Pikihuia Awards (formerly the Huia Short Story Awards)	Awarded biennially to Māori writers by the Māori Literature Trust to encourage diverse Māori viewpoints and writing in both te reo Māori and English. Selected winners and finalists are published in the Huia Short Stories collection.	Māori writing	1995
Prime Minister's Awards for Literary Achievement	Awarded annually to writers who have made notable literary achievements and a significant contribution to New Zealand literature, in the categories of fiction, non-fiction and poetry.	General writing	2003
Queen's Gold Medal for Poetry	Awarded annually for a book of verse published by someone in any of the Commonwealth realms, including New Zealand.	Poetry	1933
Randell Cottage Writers' Residency	Awarded annually to one New Zealand writer and one French writer, comprising a stipend and six months' rent-free accommodation at Randell Cottage. The recipient will usually be a mid-career writer.	Fellowship or residency	2002
Robert Burns Fellowship	Awarded annually to writers of imaginative literature, and provides a year's salary along with accommodation and an office for a writer in and around the University of Otago.	Fellowship or residency	1959
Robert Lord Writers Cottage Residency	Awarded on an ad-hoc basis to writers who stay for three to six months at the cottage of Robert Lord in Dunedin.	Fellowship or residency	2003
Russell Clark Award	Awarded annually by LIANZA to a New Zealand author for excellence in children's book illustration. Since 2016 has been awarded as part of the New Zealand Book Awards for Children and Young Adults.	Children's literature	1975
Sarah Broom Poetry Prize	Awarded annually to an original collection of poems by a New Zealand resident or citizen. Established to celebrate the life and work of New Zealand poet Sarah Broom.	Poetry	2014
Sargeson Prize	Promoted (as of 2021) as "New Zealand's richest short story prize, sponsored by the University of Waikato. Named for celebrated New Zealand writer Frank Sargeson, the Prize was conceived by writer Catherine Chidgey, who also lectures in Writing Studies at the University." There are Open and Secondary School divisions.	Short story cash prize	2019
Sir James Wallace Master of Creative Writing Prize	Awarded annually to the best portfolio in the Masters of Creative Writing programme at the University of Auckland.	University prize	2012
Sir Julius Vogel Award	Awarded annually at the New Zealand National Science Fiction Convention to recognise achievement in science fiction, fantasy, horror, and science fiction fandom.	Science fiction and fantasy	2002
Storylines Children's Literature Foundation of New Zealand Notable Books List	An annual list of exceptional and outstanding books for children and young people published in New Zealand, by New Zealand authors and illustrators.	Children's literature	1999
Sunday Star-Times Short Story Competition	Awarded annually by the Sunday Star-Times to short stories in an Open section and a Secondary School Students section.	Short stories	1984
Te Pae Tawhiti Awards	Annual juried award to celebrate and inspire speculative fiction writers from Aotearoa and the Pacific Islands.	Speculative Fiction	2025
Tessa Duder Award	Awarded annually by the Storylines Children's Literature Charitable Trust to the author of a work of fiction for young adults aged 13 and above.	Children's literature	2010
Todd New Writer's Bursary	Awarded annually by Creative New Zealand to enable a promising published writer or playwright at an early stage of their career to work on a new project.	General writing	2010
Tom Fitzgibbon Award	Awarded annually by the Storylines Children's Literature Charitable Trust to a previously unpublished writer for an original work of fiction intended for children between 7 and 13 years of age	Children's literature	1996
University of Auckland Residencies	The University of Auckland funds up to four writers each year, in partnership with Creative New Zealand and the Michael King Writers Centre, to work on creative projects, stay at a historic villa and interact with university students. The residencies are open to established writers with a substantial publishing record.	Fellowship or residency	2007
University of Otago College of Education / Creative New Zealand Children's Writer in Residence	Awarded annually to children's writers who normally live in New Zealand. Includes a six-month fellowship, a stipend and an office at the University of Otago College of Education.	Fellowship or residency	1992
University of Waikato Writer in Residence	Awarded annually by the University of Waikato to writers with a record of publications of high quality and provides the recipient with freedom to write for 12 months.	Fellowship or residency	1991
Ursula Bethell Residency in Creative Writing	Awarded annually by the University of Canterbury College of Arts and Creative New Zealand to authors of proven merit in all areas of literary and creative activity, it supports work on an approved project within an academic setting for a duration of 12 months. Established in memory of Ursula Bethell.	Fellowship or residency	1979
Victoria University Emerging Māori Writer in Residence	Awarded annually by Victoria University of Wellington to Māori writers of proven merit. Residencies are three months' duration and include a writing room, a mentor from the Māori arts community, and a stipend of NZ$15,000.	Fellowship or residency	2019
Victoria University Emerging Pasifika Writer in Residence	Awarded annually by Victoria University of Wellington to Pasifika writers of proven merit. Residencies are three months' duration and include a writing room, a mentor from the Pasifika arts community, and a stipend of NZ$15,000.	Fellowship or residency	2019
Victoria University Writer in Residence	Awarded annually by Victoria University of Wellington, it supports the appointee in writing full-time for 12 months within an academic setting.	Fellowship or residency	1979
Wild Creations programme	Awarded annually to support a minimum of two conservation-related art projects by the Department of Conservation in collaboration with Creative New Zealand.	General creative arts	2002
Wright Family Foundation Te Kura Pounamu Award (previously the Te Kura Pounamu Award)	Awarded annually by Te Rōpū Whakahau, LIANZA and the New Zealand Book Awards Trust to the author of a book written in Te Reo Māori that is considered to be a distinguished contribution to the literature for children or young people.	Māori children's literature	1995

== Defunct awards ==
Name of award	Description	Type of award	Start	End
A W Reed Award for Contribution to New Zealand Literature (also known as the A W Reed Lifetime Achievement Award)	Awarded for lifetime contributions to New Zealand literature in the years 2000–2002 and 2004 at the Montana New Zealand Book Awards.	Lifetime achievement	2000	2004
Arts Foundation of New Zealand New Generation Awards	Awarded annually (or every two years) to artists at an early stage in their career who show outstanding promise.	General creative arts	2006	2018
Choysa Bursary for Children's Literature	Awarded annually to enable writers of children's literature to work on a specific project. Established and funded by the New Zealand Literary Fund and corporate sponsor Quality Packers Limited.	Children's literature	1978	Unknown
Glenn Schaeffer Prize in Modern Letters	Awarded biennially to an emerging New Zealand writer by Victoria University of Wellington, valued at NZ$65,000. Not awarded since 2008.	University prize	2002	2008
Goodman Fielder Wattie Book Awards (known from 1994 to 1995 as the Montana Book Awards)	Predecessor to the Ockham New Zealand Book Awards. First, second and third place prizes awarded annually to New Zealand books in a range of genres.	General writing	1968	1995
Jack Lasenby Award	Awarded biennially to winners of a competition for children's writers and for children who write in the Wellington region. Established in 2002 by the Wellington Children's Book Foundation in honour of Jack Lasenby.	Children's literature	2002	Unknown
Katherine Mansfield Memorial Award (also known as the Bank of New Zealand Literary Awards and the Bank of New Zealand Katherine Mansfield Awards)	Awarded annually to unpublished short stories and essays in commemoration of Katherine Mansfield's contributions to New Zealand literature. Established and sponsored by the Bank of New Zealand.	Short stories	1959	2015
Nestlé Write Around New Zealand	Creative writing competition for school students in years seven and eight.	Children's literature	2001	Unknown
New Zealand Book Awards	Predecessor to the Ockham New Zealand Book Awards. Established by the New Zealand Literary Fund, a government organisation, in 1976. Annual awards were presented for literary merit in fiction, non-fiction, poetry and (later) book production.	General writing	1976	1995
Nielsen BookData New Zealand Booksellers' Choice Award	Awarded annually by Nielsen BookData to the book which booksellers most enjoyed reading, selling and promoting.	General writing	2001	2013
NZSA Janet Frame Memorial Award	Awarded biennially by the New Zealand Society of Authors to writers of poetry and imaginative fiction.	Poetry Fiction	2008	2016

== See also ==
- New Zealand literature
