= Ken Catran =

New Zealand novelist and television scriptwriter

Ken Catran (born 16 May 1944) is a children's novelist and television screenwriter from New Zealand.

== Career ==
Catran is the author of many teen novels, including Taken at the Flood, Voyage with Jason, Doomfire on Venus, Space Wolf, Jacko Moran: Sniper, Talking to Blue and its sequels Blue Murder and Blue Blood. He also contributed to the television dramas Shortland Street and Close to Home. Around 1993, he moved away from screenwriting to focus more on writing novels. Since then, he has become a prolific and varied writer within the New Zealand literary community.

Ken's television credits include soap operas (Radio Waves, Close to Home), Steel Riders (a drama series for young adults) as well as episodes in other TV dramas such as Mortimer's Patch.

He also penned Under the Mountain, an 8-episode treatment of the Maurice Gee novel, and wrote the critically well-received Hanlon, a biographical law drama. The opening episode treating sympathetically the Minnie Dean case received positive ratings and critical reception.

== Awards ==
In 1986, Catran won the Drama Script category in the Listener Television Awards (also called the GOFTA Awards) for the first episode of Hanlon, In Defence of Minnie Dean.

In 2004, Catran won the Esther Glen Award, presented by LIANZA, for his book, Jacko Moran, Sniper. Another six of his books have been short-listed for the award from 1997 to 2013, and Smiling Jack was a finalist for the 2011 LIANZA Young Adult Fiction Award.

In 2001, Catran's book, Voyage with Jason, won the Children's Book of the Year award, and the Young Adult Fiction category, at the New Zealand Post Children's Book Awards. Later, his book, Smiling Jack, won the Children's Choice Young Adult Fiction category at the 2011 awards. An additional three of his books have been shortlisted at the various incarnations of these awards — Deepwater Black and Dream-bite for Senior Fiction, and Something Weird about Mr Foster for Junior Fiction.

In 2007, after writing more than 30 novels, he won the Margaret Mahy Medal, awarded by the Storylines Children's Literature Charitable Trust to a person who has made a significant contribution to children's literature, publishing, or literacy. At least one of his books have been on the Storylines Notable Books List in the Young Adult Fiction category from when the list was established in 2000 to 2008, and again in 2011. In 2003 one of his books was included in the Junior Fiction category of the list, Something Weird About Mr Foster.

He was the University of Otago College of Education Children's Writer in Residence in 1996, and the University of Waikato Writer in Residence in 2007.

In 2005 he was presented with the Sir Julius Vogel Award for services to science fiction and fantasy, and was nominated for the Sir Julius Vogel Best Novel for Protus Rising.

== Personal life ==
Catran is married to Wendy Catran, a screenwriter and children's writer. They live in Waimate, a township in South Canterbury, New Zealand. Through an interview, he has revealed that he chose writing over other interests because it 'came naturally to me'. He relaxes by going for walks and reading regularly.

Catran also frequently visits schools and gives advice to young writers on creating novels and short stories.
