= Triple Ripple =

Children book

- Author: Brigid Lowry
- Genre: Juvenile fiction; Fairy tale
- Publisher: Allen and Unwin
- Publication date: March 2011
- Publication place: Australia
- Pages: 235
- ISBN: 9781742374994
- OCLC: 709551334
- LC Class: PZ7.L96725 Tri 2011

Triple Ripple is a book for girls aged 12 years and older, written by award-winning New Zealand-born author Brigid Lowry and published by Allen and Unwin.

== About ==
It is a fairytale about Glory, who is sent to work at a palace for the Princess, Mirabella, and finds out the main reason she was sent there is because she got cursed. Nova is reading the fairytale, and has to deal with the troubles of her father, mother, her best friend leaving and Dylan, the mean girl at school, and Nova then discovers the reason Dylan is being mean is because she has to deal with her father's cancer. The Writer has to make everything in the fairytale work out all right, but has trouble coming up with the best way of saying it.
