= Elizabeth Pulford =

- Born: 16 February 1943 (age 83); Grimsby, Ontario, Canada
- Occupation: Writer
- Website: Elizabeth Pulford

Elizabeth Pulford is a writer of fiction, poetry and non-fiction for children, teenagers and adults. Several of her books have been shortlisted for awards, and many of her short stories have won or been highly commended in national competitions. She lives in Outram, Otago, New Zealand.

== Biography ==
Elizabeth Pulford was born on 16 February 1943 in Grimsby, Ontario, Canada. After her father died, her mother brought their four children by ship back to New Zealand. From the age of two, Pulford grew up in Dunedin and was later educated there. She has had a number of jobs including typist, cleaner, ice cream seller in a cinema and hot dog seller.

She started to write in her early 40s after attending a night class for creative writing run by teacher Charles Croot. Since then, she has written and published more than 65 books. Her stories, poetry and articles for children and adults have been included in anthologies and in Poems in the Waiting Room, published in the School Journal and in newspapers, magazines and journals and broadcast on Radio New Zealand.

Elizabeth Pulford is married with two children and two grandchildren. She lives in Outram, Otago.

== Awards and prizes ==
Many of her short stories for adults have won or been highly commended for competitions. She has won the Timaru Herald / Aoraki Festival Short Story Competition in 1990, the New Zealand Women's Writers Society Christine Jefferson Award in 1990, the South Island Writers Association Dame Ngaio Marsh Competition in 1989 and 1993, the Joan Faulkner Blake Memorial Competition in 1996 and the Dunedin Library Centennial Romantic Competition in 2008. She was runner-up for the BBC Commonwealth Competition in 1997 and shortlisted for the BNZ Katherine Mansfield Competition in 1998 and 2007.

Several of her books have been named as Storylines Notable Books. The Memory Tree (1997), Call of the Cruins (2000) and Tussock (2011) were shortlisted for the New Zealand Post Children's Book Awards. Finding Monkey Moon was shortlisted in two categories (the Picture Book award and the Russell Clark Illustration Award) in the 2016 New Zealand Book Awards for Children and Young Adults.

In 2007, she was awarded the 2007 Ohau House Writer’s Retreat residency.

== Bibliography ==
- My Sister is Magic, illustrated by Linda McClelland (Ashton Scholastic, 1994)
- The Three-Legged Race (Reed, 1995)
- The Memory Tree, ill. Brent Putze (Scholastic, 1996)
- The Midnight Feast, ill. Fifi Colston (Scholastic, 1996)
- A Piece of Paper (Shortland Publications, 1997)
- Nightmare (Shortland Publications, 1997)
- Fuzz and the Glass Eye (Shortland Publications, 1997)
- Cottle Street (Shortland Publications, 1997)
- King Kong and the Flower Fairy (Shortland Publications, 1997)
- Trailblazers (Shortland Publications, 1997)
- Arista and the Wagon (Shortland Publications, 1997)
- Pete Paints a Picture (Shortland Publications, 1997)
- Jellylegs, ill. Jenny Cooper (Scholastic, 2000)
- Call of the Cruins (Scholastic, 2000)
- The Christmas-hiccup-play, ill. Liam Gerrard [Kiwi Bites] (Puffin, 2003)
- Castello Italiano (Penguin, 2004)
- Daisy Doll, ill. Denise Durkin (Scholastic, 2004)
- The Train (Wright McGraw-Hill, 2004)
- Penny's Plane (Wright McGraw-Hill, 2004)
- Can't Catch Me! (Scholastic, 2005)
- The Sunflower Tree, ill. Karactaz (Gilt Edge Publishing, 2005)
- Gum (Oxford University Press, 2006)
- Disaster (Oxford University Press, 2006)
- No Frills on Me (Oxford University Press, 2006)
- Mr Potty's Plums, ill. Karactaz (Gilt Edge Publishing, 2006)
- Mrs Begg's Beautiful Egg, ill. Blair Sayer (Gilt Edge Publishing, 2006)
- I'm Going To The Moon, ill. Elaine Nicholas (Gilt Edge Publishing, 2006)
- Shut the Gate (Scholastic, 2006)
- Castlecliff and the Fossil Princess (Walker Books Australia, 2007)
- Sea Dreamer (Random House, 2007)
- Famous, ill. Elliot Stewart [Kiwi Bites] (Penguin, 2007)
- The Stamp Boy, ill. Amy Lee (Gilt Edge Publishing, 2007)
- Dr Neal's Squeaky Wheels, ill. Karactaz (Gilt Edge Publishing, 2007)
- Mr Potty's Hedge, ill. Karactaz (Gilt Edge Publishing, 2007)
- Tich (Wendy Pye Publishing, 2008)
- Waterworks (Wendy Pye Publishing, 2008)
- Blackthorn (Walker Books, 2008)
- Blackthorn's Betrayal (Walker Books Australia, 2009)
- On a Rabbit Hunt (Scholastic NZ, 2009)
- Tussock (Walker Books Australia, 2010)
- The Quest of the Rotten Egg (Scholastic NZ, 2011)
- The Littlest Angel - Lily Gets Her Wings, ill. Aki Fukuoka (Scholastic NZ, 2011)
- The Littlest Angel - Lily Has a Secret (Scholastic NZ, 2011)
- The Littlest Angel - Lily Goes Skitter Skating, ill. Aki Fukuoka (Scholastic NZ, 2011)
- The Littlest Angel - Lily Lands in Bubble Trouble (Scholastic NZ, 2011)
- Broken (Walker Books Australia, 2012)
- The Mysterious Magical Shop, ill. Rachel Driscoll (Scholastic, 2012)
- Far, far from Home, ill. Fifi Colston (Scholastic, 2012)
- Finding Monkey Moon, ill. Kate Wilkinson (Walker Books Australia & Candlewick, 2015)
- Sanspell - The Bloodtree Chronicles, Book one, ill. Donovan Bixley (Scholastic, 2015)
- Bragonsthyme - The Bloodtree Chronicles, Book two (Scholastic, 2015)
- Rasmas, ill. Jenny Cooper (Scholastic, 2016)
- Thatchthorpe - The Bloodtree Chronicles, Book three (Scholastic, 2016)
- Seeking an Aurora, ill. Anne Bannock (One Tree House, 2018)
- Lily and the Lost Stitch (Sunshine Books - Wendy Pye 2021)
- Honk (One Tree House, 2021
- A Definitely Different Summer (Bateman Books - 2021)
