= William Taylor (writer) =

New Zealand writer

William Robin Taylor ONZM (11 October 1938 – 3 October 2015) was a New Zealand writer.

== Biography ==
Taylor was born in Lower Hutt. Before he began writing in the 1980s, Taylor worked as a primary school principal and served as mayor of Ohakune from 1981 to 1988, before moving to Raurimu. He won the Choysa Bursary in 1986, and turned his attention to writing full-time that year. Taylor's last book was published in 2010, the memoir Telling Tales: A Life in Writing.

Taylor died in 2015 at Taumarunui. His funeral was held on 8 October 2015, three days before he was to turn 77.

== Honours and awards ==
Over the course of his career, Taylor won the Esther Glen Award (1991), an AIM Children's Book Award (1995), a Margaret Mahy Medal (1999), and was nominated for a Lambda Literary Award (2000).

In 1998 Taylor was the University of Otago College of Education/Creative New Zealand Children's Writer in Residence, jointly with Janice Marriott.

In the 2004 Queen's Birthday Honours, Taylor was appointed an Officer of the New Zealand Order of Merit, for services to children's literature and the community.

== Works ==
=== Adult fiction ===
- Episode (1970)
- The Mask of the Clown (1970)
- The Plekhov Place (1971)
- Pieces in a Jigsaw (1972)
- The Persimmon Tree (1972)
- The Chrysalis (1974)

=== Non-fiction ===
- Burnt Carrots Don't Have Legs (1976)
- Telling Tales a Life in Writing (2010)

=== Young Adult fiction ===
- Pack Up, Pick Up And Off (1981)
- Shooting Though (1986)
- My Summer of the Lions (1986)
- Possum Perkins (1987), printed in the US as Paradise Lane (1987)
- The Worst Soccer Team Ever (1987)
- Break A Leg (1987)
- Making Big Bucks (1987)
- I Hate My Brother Maxwell Potter (1989)
- Kidnap of Jessie Parker (1989)
- Agnes The Sheep (1990)
- The Porter Brothers (1990)
- Knitwits (1992)
- Supermum And Spike The Dog (1992)
- Fast Times at Greenhill High (1992)
- Beth And Bruno (1992)
- S.W.A.T. The Southside War Against Terrorists (1993)
- The Blue Lawn (1994)
- Numbskulls (1995
- The Fatz Katz (1995)
- Annie and Co. And Marilyn Munroe (1995)
- The Fatz Twins and the Haunted House (1996)
- Nick's Story (1996)
- Circles (1996)
- Hark The Herald Angel (1997)
- The Fatz Twins and the Cuckoo in the Nest (1997)
- At Then Big Red Rooster (1998)
- Harry Houdini-Wonderdog! (1999)
- Jerome (1999)
- Hotmail (2000)
- Crash! The Story of Poddy (2000)
- Scarface and the Angel (2000)
- Spider: A Novel (2001)
- Pebble in a Pool (2003)
- Land of Milk and Honey (2005)
- Gladys the Goat (2005)
- Albert the Cat (2005)
