= See Ya, Simon =

1992 novel by David Hill

- First edition
- Author: David Hill
- Language: English
- Genre: Fiction, Young adult novel
- Publisher: Mallinson Rendel
- Publication date: 1992
- Publication place: New Zealand
- Media type: Print (Paperback)
- Pages: 128 pp
- ISBN: 9780143318026

See Ya, Simon is a novel for young adults by David Hill, published in 1992. The story centers around a boy suffering from muscular dystrophy.

== Plot ==
See Ya, Simon is a fictional novel about a boy named Simon who has muscular dystrophy. The narrative makes it clear that Simon will not live for another year. Despite his prognosis, Simon remains a righteous and humorous character, unafraid to share his opinions and seemingly indifferent to his impending death.

== Main characters ==
=== Simon ===
Simon Shaw has a family of four. An older sister Kirsti, his Mum, and his dad. He likes role-playing and has a good sense of humour. He dislikes being left out and being treated differently. He is underweight with no build due to his Muscular Dystrophy. He has brown hair and at times it seems that Simon has a spoilt personality because everyone gives him special treatment.

=== Nathan ===
Nathan, who is Simon's best friend, has a family of four. His parents have split up, and he has a little sister, Fiona. He looks thin and is of small build. He’s got brown hair, and he treats Simon like a brother as they have a very close bond.

== Minor characters ==
=== Alex Wilson ===
Alex is one of Nathan and Simon’s enemies. He is considered to be the school bully. Not much is said about Alex’s appearance, but Nathan often refers to him as looking like an "ape" or a "monkey." Alex is not the smartest kid on the block. This is seen when Nathan makes fun of him saying “his brain is rolling around in his head.” Although Alex is a bully, when Simon died, he was sensitive to Nathan.

=== Brady West ===
Brady is the prettiest girl in Nathan’s and Simon’s class. Brady has long blonde hair, blue eyes, and a beautiful sense of style. Nathan has a HUGE crush on her. But as the book goes on, Nathan gets to know her better and learns she might not be what she seems.

== Setting ==
The story takes place in New Zealand. The main settings are in Simon and Nathan's school, their homes, and the hospital.
