= Shirley Corlett =

New Zealand writer

- Born: 20 July 1940 (age 86); Wellington, New Zealand
- Occupation: Writer

Shirley Corlett (born 20 July 1940) is a writer of fiction for children and adults. She lives in Masterton, New Zealand.

== Biography ==
Shirley Corlett was born on 20 July 1940 in Wellington.

Her first book, The Hanging Sky, a historical saga, was followed by a number of books for children. Several of these have been named as Storylines Notable Books. The Weather-makers was shortlisted for the Junior Fiction section of the New Zealand Post Children’s Book Awards in 2002, and You’ve Got Guts, Kenny Melrose was shortlisted in the same category for the same awards in 2005. Two of her books are part of the popular My Story series.

She also works as a mentor for new writers.

She is married and lives in Masterton.

== Awards and Prizes ==
Shirley Corlett's first children’s novel, The Stolen, won the Tom Fitzgibbon Award in 1999.

In 2005, she was the joint recipient of the University of Otago College of Education Writer in Residence with Margaret Beames.

== Bibliography ==
The Hanging Sky (Mallinson Rendel, 1990)

The Stolen (Scholastic, 2000)

Abandon Ship! The Diary of Debbie Atherton, Wellington, 1968 [My Story series] (Scholastic, 2003) (republished as The Wahine Disaster: Wellington, 1968 in 2013)

The Weather-Makers (Scholastic, 2001)

You’ve Got Guts, Kenny Melrose (Scholastic, 2004)

Fire in the Sky: The Diary of James Collier, Tarawera, 1886 [My Story series] (Scholastic, 2005)

Through Thick and Thin (Scholastic, 2005)

In the Spotlight (Gilt Edge, 2008)

Addie Accident (Scholastic, 2010)

A Catastrophe of Gigantic Proportions (The Copy Press, 2018)
