= Right Where It Hurts =

First edition (publ. Mallinson Rendel)

Right Where It Hurts is a 2001 children's book written by New Zealand author David Hill.

It is about a boy named Slade Tyson, who moves to place called Green Harbour, situated in New Zealand, and meets Mallory Garner, a rich, snobby girl who goes to his new school. At first Slade dislikes Mallory, but as they get to know each other, they start to form a strong friendship. Slade finds out that Mallory is put under a lot of pressure by her parents, and hurts herself whenever she does something wrong.

It was awarded the 2003 Esther Glen Children's Book Award from LIANZA, the Library and Information Association of New Zealand Aotearoa.
