= Jennifer Beck (writer) =

New Zealand writer

Jennifer Beck ONZM
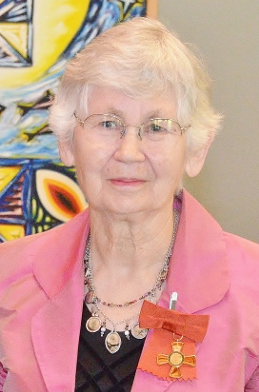
- Beck in 2015
- Born: 9 December 1939 (age 86); Auckland, New Zealand
- Occupation: Writer

Jennifer Lillian Beck ONZM (born 9 December 1939) is a New Zealand writer of over 50 children’s books. Her work, often focusing on themes of history, peace and war, has won numerous prizes and awards. She lives in Auckland, New Zealand.

== Biography ==
Beck was born on 9 December 1939 in Auckland, New Zealand. She grew up in a large family where the children created their own entertainment by making up plays, games and word games; library books, drawing and painting also formed an important part of her childhood. She was educated at Waipu District High School, Auckland Teachers’ College and the University of Auckland, graduating with an MA (Hons) DipClinPsych. She worked as a teacher and psychologist before becoming a full-time writer in 2003 and has written more than 50 books for trade and educational publishers.

Several of her books, such as The Bantam and the Soldier, Stefania's Dancing Slippers, Remember that November, Torty and the Soldier and The Anzac Violin, deal with topics of history and war. Remember that November was chosen to represent New Zealand at the IBBY (International Board on Books for Young People) Nami Island Book Festival in South Korea in 2007.

In 2023 she published her memoir Bits of String Too Short to Use.

== Awards and residencies ==
Beck’s work has garnered numerous prizes and awards. Several of her books have been shortlisted for book awards or named as Storylines Notable Books. The Bantam and The Soldier, written by Beck and illustrated by Robyn Belton, and described as a "remarkable children’s (anti-)war story", was New Zealand Post Children’s Book Awards 1997 Picture Book Winner and Book of the Year.

In 2006, she won the Children's Choice Award, voted for by thousands of children across New Zealand, with Nobody's Dog, illustrated by Lindy Fisher.

In 2015, Beck and Robyn Belton shared a joint residency as University of Otago College of Education / Creative New Zealand Children’s Writer in Residence. During this time, they worked on The Anzac Violin, based on the story of Alexander Aitken and the Aitken Violin, now on display at Otago Boys' High School.

In the 2015 Queen's Birthday Honours, Beck was appointed an Officer of the New Zealand Order of Merit, for services to children's literature.

== Bibliography ==
- The Choosing Day illustrated by Robyn Belton (Century Hutchinson, 1988)
- David's Dad ill. Robyn Belton (Random Century, 1990)
- The Bantam and the Soldier ill. Robyn Belton (Scholastic, 1996)
- The Christmas Caravan ill. Robyn Belton (Scholastic, 2002)
- John Britten: The Boy Who Did Do Better (Scholastic, 2004)
- Nobody's Dog ill. Lindy Fisher (Scholastic, 2005)
- A Present from the Past ill. Lindy Fisher (Scholastic, 2006)
- Stefania's Dancing Slippers ill. Lindy Fisher (Scholastic, 2007)
- Rufus the Rooster (Polygraphia, 2010)
- Whetu: The Little Blue Duck ill. Renee Haggo (David Ling, 2011)
- Gypsy Day on the Farm ill. Lisa Allen (New Holland, 2011)
- Sam Goes Wild ill. Jenna Packer (New Holland, 2011)
- Remember that November / Maumahara ki tera Naema ill. Lindy Fisher and translated by Kawata Teepa (Huia, 2012)
- Torty and the soldier ill. Fifi Colston (Scholastic, 2017)
- The Anzac Violin ill. Robyn Belton (Scholastic, 2018)
- Bits of String too Short to Use (Mary Egan Publishing, 2023) - memoir
