= I Am Not Esther =

I Am Not Esther is a teenage fiction novel by Fleur Beale published in 1998.

== Plot ==
Fourteen-year-old Kirby Greenland's mother leaves her with unfamiliar relatives in a strange city, supposedly leaving New Zealand for two years to help refugees. Kirby's new guardians and their six children belong to a strict fundamentalist Christian sect called the Children of the Faith. They abhor all recreation and any immodesty, devoting themselves to industry and bible study. They insist that Kirby must leave her old self behind and emphasise that Kirby dissent, her uncle insists that the entire family prays over her until she repents. Concern for her youngest cousin prompts her to relent but she soon becomes aware that she is losing her identity and determines to escape although she feels responsible for the cousins that she has grown to love. She is also concerned about the fate of her cousin, Miriam, who disappeared shortly before her arrival, but is barely mentioned by the family, other than her being "dead". She knows that not all the children of the cult members are completely indoctrinated: her cousin Daniel wants to be a doctor, despite the proscription on higher education, and her schoolfriends misbehave when they are away from home. Kirby and Daniel are thrown out of the sect at the end of the book because he reveals his wish to be a doctor "so I can help you all". A mass brawl/fight scene ensues as the Elders beat Daniel. They go to Wellington, and find Kirby's mother in a psychiatric hospital and help her to recover. Meanwhile, Kirby has been having nightmares about becoming Esther again; it is only when she sees a documentary about the faith that she realises "Esther is dead".

== Background ==
The title I Am Not Esther comes from Kirby's catchphrase "I am not Esther", as this is what her aunt, uncle and other people in the faith insist on calling her. She is worried that she is turning into Esther particularly when it is pointed out to her that Kirby would have said "I'm not Esther" – the faith did not use abbreviated words.

Beale was inspired to write this by "a boy I taught who had been thrown out of his family because he wanted to be a doctor". She describes the cultists with respect; she is hostile to the behaviour and not the people. Despite this, the cultists are depicted as brutal opponents of the brave doubters, largely as a consequence of using Kirby's perspective.

== Sequel ==
In 2012, Beale published a sequel to I Am Not Esther, titled I am Rebecca. One of the sequels is written from the perspective of her cousin Rebecca, who is moving to Nelson with the rest of her family, as shown at the end of I Am Not Esther. The third book is called "Being Magdalene" which is written from Magdalene's point of view.

== Awards ==
- Shortlisted, senior fiction section, 1999 New Zealand Post Children's Book Awards.
