= Robyn Belton =

New Zealand children's book illustrator (born 1947)

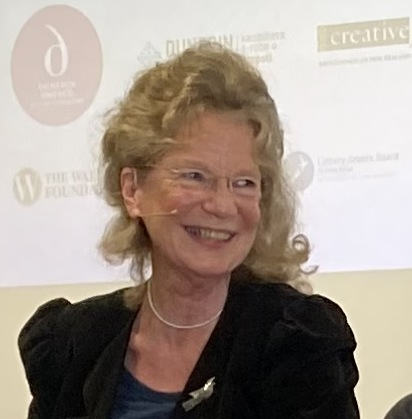
- Belton at the 2021 Dunedin Writers and Readers Festival
- Born: 1947 (age 78–79)
- Known for: Illustration

Robyn Belton is an illustrator of children's books. Her work, often focusing on themes of war and peace, has won many prizes, including the New Zealand Post Children's Book Awards 1997 Picture Book Winner and Book of the Year, and the Russell Clark Award in 1985 and 2009. She herself has been recognised with the prestigious Storylines Margaret Mahy Award and the inaugural Ignition Children's Book Festival Award. She lives in Otago, New Zealand.

== Biography ==
Robyn Belton was born in 1947. She grew up on a farm at Whangaehu, near Whanganui and went to boarding school at Whanganui from the age of 12. Later she studied at the Canterbury School of Fine Arts where Russell Clark was one of her tutors and began her illustrating work for the New Zealand School Journal in 1977. With her husband Peter, she lived in Levin and Nelson before moving to Dunedin.

Her illustration style has been described as focusing on "the detail of everyday life" and bringing "a whimsical touch”. She has illustrated books by Margaret Mahy and Joy Cowley (including the popular Greedy Cat series). With author Jennifer Beck, she has produced titles such as The Bantam and the Soldier and The Anzac Violin which deal sensitively with war-related topics Talking with fellow artist Jenny Cooper, Belton commented that “somehow, unintentionally, we've both become ‘war artists'” and added “I tell myself that I'm being a Peace Warrior and hope like anything that it might do some good."

== Awards and residencies ==
Belton's work has won her numerous prizes and awards. Several of her books have been shortlisted for the Russell Clark Award for Illustration or named as Storylines Notable Books. The Bantam and The Soldier, written by Jennifer Beck and illustrated by Robyn Belton, was New Zealand Post Children's Book Awards 1997 Picture Book Winner and Book of the Year.

The Duck in the Gun, an anti-war picture book written by Joy Cowley and illustrated by Robyn Belton, won the Russell Clark Award in 1985 and was later selected as one of ten books for the Hiroshima Peace Museum.

Herbert the Brave Sea Dog, based on the true story of a dog lost at sea, was both written and illustrated by Belton and won the 2009 Russell Clark Award.

Belton was awarded the Storylines Margaret Mahy Medal in 2006 and delivered her speech titled "Gathering Images: The Stories Behind the Pictures". In 2011, she was the recipient of the William Hodges Fellowship.

In 2015, Belton and Jennifer Beck shared a joint residency as University of Otago College of Education / Creative New Zealand Children's Writer in Residence. During this time, they worked on The Anzac Violin, based on the story of Alexander Aitken and the Aitken Violin, now on display at Otago Boys' High School.

In 2018, she received the inaugural Ignition Children's Book Festival Award in Dunedin for her "sustained and dedicated contribution to children’s literature and illustration over a lifetime of work."

== Bibliography ==
Greedy Cat by Joy Cowley (School Publications Branch 1980)

The Duck in the Gun by Joy Cowley (Shortland Educational 1984, Japan Peace Museum 1990, Walker Books 2009)

Donkey by George Ciantar (Shortland, 1986)

The Girl Who Washed in Moonlight by Margaret Mahy (Heinemann, 1987)

The Choosing Day by Jennifer Beck (Century Hutchinson, 1988)

David's Dad by Jennifer Beck (Random Century 1990, Ashton Scholastic 1991)

Bow Down Shadrach by Joy Cowley (Hodder & Stoughton, 1991)

I'm Glad the Sky is Painted Blue: Poems for the Very Young selected by Rosalyn Barnett (Mallinson Rendel, 1993)

The Bantam and the Soldier by Jennifer Beck (Scholastic, 1996)

Pigeon Princess: A Modern Fantasy text by Joy Cowley (Shortland Publications, 2001)

The Christmas Caravan by Jennifer Beck (Scholastic, 2002)

Greedy Cat and the Birthday Cake by Joy Cowley (HarperCollins, 2003)

Greedy Cat and the School Pet Show by Joy Cowley (Scholastic, 2004)

Marta and the Manger Straw: A Christmas Tradition from Poland by Virginia Kroll (Zonderkidz, 2005)

Greedy Cat and the Sneeze by Joy Cowley (Scholastic, 2006)

Herbert: The Brave Sea Dog (Craig Potton Publishing, 2008)

Greedy Cat and the Goldfish by Joy Cowley (Scholastic, 2009)

Farmer John's Tractor by Sally Sutton (Walker Books, 2012)

Teddy Bear's Promise by Diana Noonan (Craig Potton Publishing, 2013)

The Anzac Violin by Jennifer Beck (Scholastic, 2018)
