= Bernard Beckett =

New Zealand writer (born 1967)

- Born: 13 October 1967 (age 59); Featherston, New Zealand
- Occupations: Author, high school teacher

Bernard Beckett (born 13 October 1967) is a New Zealand writer of fiction for young adults. His work includes novels and plays. Beckett has taught drama, mathematics and English at several high schools in the Wellington Region, and currently teaches at Hutt Valley High School in Lower Hutt.

== Bibliography ==
- Lester (novel, 1999) ISBN 978-1-877135-21-7
- Red Cliff (novel, 2000) ISBN 978-1-877135-42-2
- Jolt (novel, 2001) ISBN 978-1-877135-50-7
- No Alarms (novel, 2002) ISBN 978-1-877135-75-0
- 3 Plays: Puck, Plan 10 from Outer Space, The End of the World as We Know It 2003
- Home Boys (novel, 2003) ISBN 978-1-877135-88-0
- Malcolm and Juliet (novel, 2004) ISBN 978-1-877135-94-1
- Deep Fried (novel, 2005) with Clare Knighton ISBN 978-1-877361-11-1
- Genesis (novel, 2006) ISBN 978-1-877361-52-4
- Falling for Science (non-fiction, 2007) ISBN 978-1-877361-72-2

== Filmography ==
- Limbo (film, 2008)
- Loaded (film, 2009)
- Last Dance (film, 2011)
- Lament (film, 2012)

== Awards ==
- 2005: Esther Glen Award at the LIANZA Children's Book Awards, for Malcolm and Juliet.
- 2005: Winner Young Adult Fiction Category of the New Zealand Post Book Awards for Children and Young Adults, for Malcolm and Juliet.
- 2007: Winner Young Adult Fiction Category of the New Zealand Post Book Awards for Children and Young Adults, for Genesis.
- 2010: Winner of Prix Sorcières in the Adolescent novels category, for Genesis
