= Anzac Bridge Fellowship =

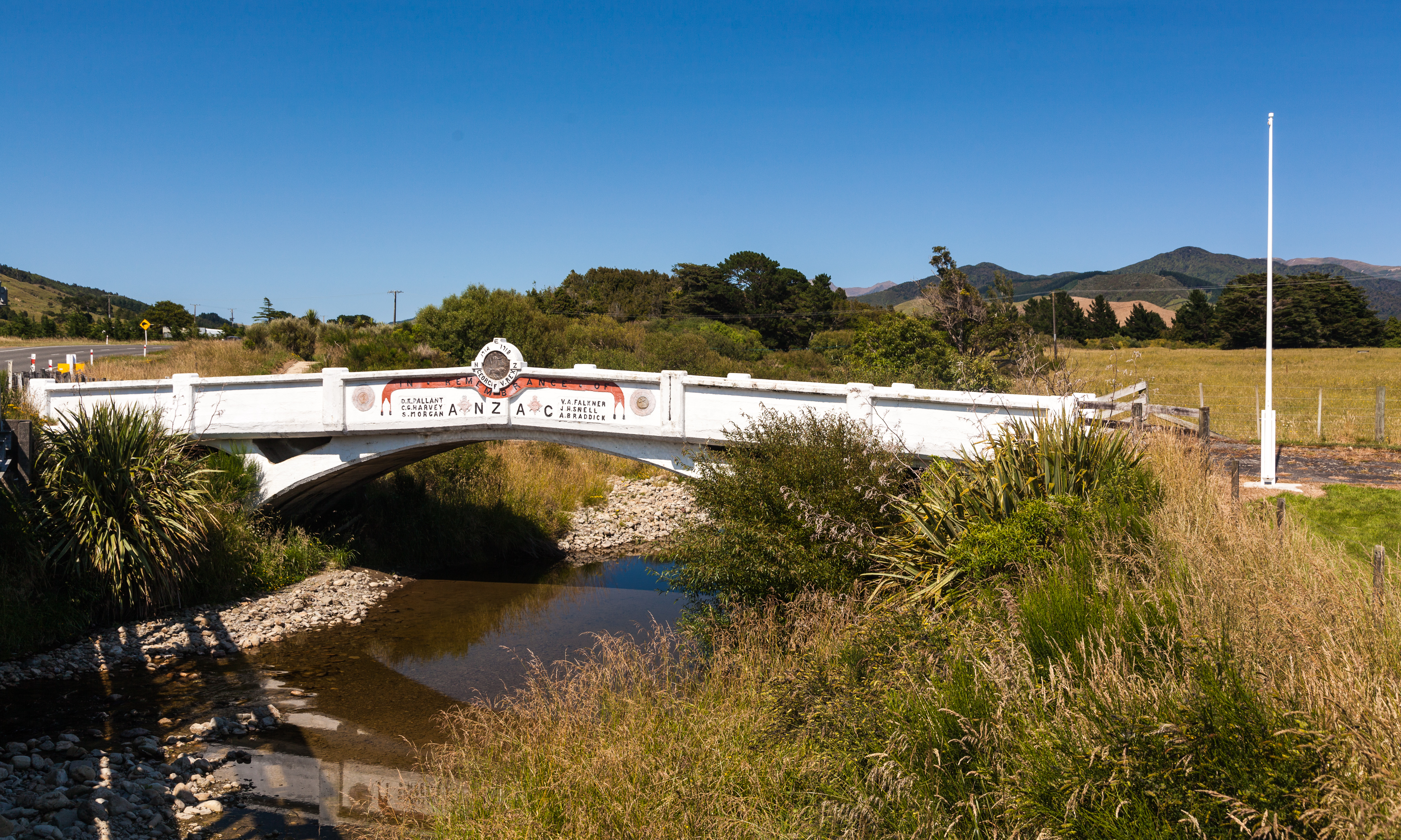
ANZAC Memorial Bridge, Kaiparoro

The Anzac Bridge Fellowship is an annual award through New Zealand Pacific Studio, an international arts residency programme closely connected to the nearby ANZAC Memorial Bridge at Kaiparoro in northern Wairarapa, and open to writers and artists from all creative backgrounds.

== History ==
The Anzac Bridge Fellowship is offered in conjunction with The Friends of ANZAC Bridge, New Zealand Pacific Studio and Trust House Community Enterprise, Masterton. It was established in 2006.

The Fellowship is focused on issues surrounding war, peace, memory and history, and has a strong connection to the nearby ANZAC Memorial Bridge at Kaiparoro in northern Wairarapa.

== Eligibility and conditions ==
The Fellowship is open to creative practitioners working in any medium.

The proposed project must meet the twin aims of community involvement (for the communities of Eketāhuna and Northern Masterton, including Kaiparoro/Mount Bruce, Mauriceville, Rongokokako and Nireaha) and contributing to or enriching the annual memorial service at the Kaiparoro Bridge on Anzac Day.

The Fellowship is for three weeks in April, leading up to the memorial service on Anzac Day (25 April).

== List of winners by year ==
2014 – Anna Borrie, Multimedia artist, Fiordland

Harakeke Cloak Remembrance Project.

2015 – Connah Podmore, Interdisciplinary artist, Wellington

Writing to History.

2016 – Philippa Werry, author, Wellington

Two Bridges, Two Countries (Kaiparoro, New Zealand and Brooweena, Australia).

2017 – Christine Yardley, theatre and ceramics artist, Australia

For King and Country, a series of community concerts featuring local and Australian performers.

2018 – Rebecca Holden, Visual Artist, Wellington

A Home Away From Home, World War I project on the women who ran the Aotea Convalescent Home for New Zealand soldiers in Egypt.

2019 – Karen Wrigglesworth, writer and engineer, Whanganui

Memorials – Keepers of the stories we tell ourselves.

2020 – Esther Bunning, portrait painter, Greytown

New Zealand – photographing horses and designing flags and banners displayed across six towns.

== See also ==
- List of New Zealand literary awards
