= Leonie Agnew =

Children's writer and teacher

Leonie Agnew is a children's writer and teacher. Several of her books have been shortlisted for or won awards, including the Tom Fitzgibbon Award in 2010, the Junior Fiction Section, the Children's Choice Junior Fiction section and the Best First Book Award of the New Zealand Post Children's Book Awards 2012, the Master of the Inkpot Competition in 2015 and the Wright Family Foundation Esther Glen Award for Junior Fiction in the New Zealand Book Awards for Children and Young Adults 2022. She has also been the recipient of a writing residency at the University of Otago. She lives in Auckland, New Zealand.

== Biography ==
Agnew was born in Auckland and grew up in Howick. She attended Baradene College for four years, then Howick College for a year. She has a Bachelor of Arts in English Literature and a Graduate Diploma in Teaching, has worked as an advertising copywriter and is now a writer, primary school teacher and creative writing tutor, living in Auckland.

She lists some of her favourite children's writers as Frank Cottrell Boyce, Patrick Ness, Margaret Mahy, Roald Dahl and James Norcliffe, naming Norcliffe's novel The Loblolly Boy in particular.

Several of her books have been shortlisted for or have won awards. She has also had work published in the New Zealand School Journal and broadcast on Radio New Zealand. She has appeared at a number of festivals and literary events including the 2015 Waiheke Literary Festival and the 2018 Auckland Writers Festival.

Agnew joined the Storylines Management Committee in 2016 and helped organise the Storylines National Children's Writers and illustrators’ Hui in Auckland in 2017. She was Chair of the organising committee for the Storylines New Zealand Writers and Illustrators’ Hui in Auckland in 2022.

== Awards and Prizes ==
Agnew won the Storylines Tom Fitzgibbon Award in 2010. This led to the publication of her first book, Super Finn, which went on to win the Junior Fiction Section, the Children's Choice Junior Fiction section and the Best First Book Award in the New Zealand Post Children's Book Awards 2012. It was also included in the Storylines Notable Book Awards 2012 and shortlisted for the LIANZA Children's Book Awards 2012.

The Importance of Green (a picture book) was shortlisted for the Joy Cowley Award.

Conrad Cooper’s Last Stand (about a young Pākehā boy and the Bastion Point occupation) won the Esther Glen Medal in the 2015 awards. Agnew traces the initial idea for this book back to a tutorial on racial identity with Samoan writer Albert Wendt during her university studies.

In 2015, Agnew won the Master of the Inkpot Competition run by UK publisher David Fickling Books with her manuscript The Impossible Boy. The resulting book was a finalist in the Junior Fiction Section of the New Zealand Book Awards for Children and Young Adults 2017.

In 2013, she was the University of Otago College of Education / Creative New Zealand Children's Writer in Residence.

The Memory Thief won the Wright Family Foundation Esther Glen Award for Junior Fiction in the 2022 New Zealand Book Awards for Children and Young Adults.

Agnew won the Storylines Tessa Duder Award in 2022 with her young adult manuscript "The impossible story of Hannah Kemp".

Agnew's 2025 book The Only Dinosaur in School was a finalist for the Bookhub Picture Book Award in the 2026 New Zealand Book Awards for Children and Young Adults.

== Bibliography ==
Super Finn (Scholastic, 2011)

The Importance of Green (Penguin Random House, 2013)

Conrad Cooper's Last Stand (Penguin Random House, 2014)

The Impossible Boy (Penguin Random House, 2016)

The Memory Thief (Puffin, 2021)

The Impossible Story of Hannah Kemp (Walker Books, 2023)

Take Me To Your Leader (Penguin Random House, 2024)

The Only Dinosaur in School (Scholastic, 2025)
