= University of Otago College of Education / Creative New Zealand Children's Writer in Residence =

Award in New Zealand

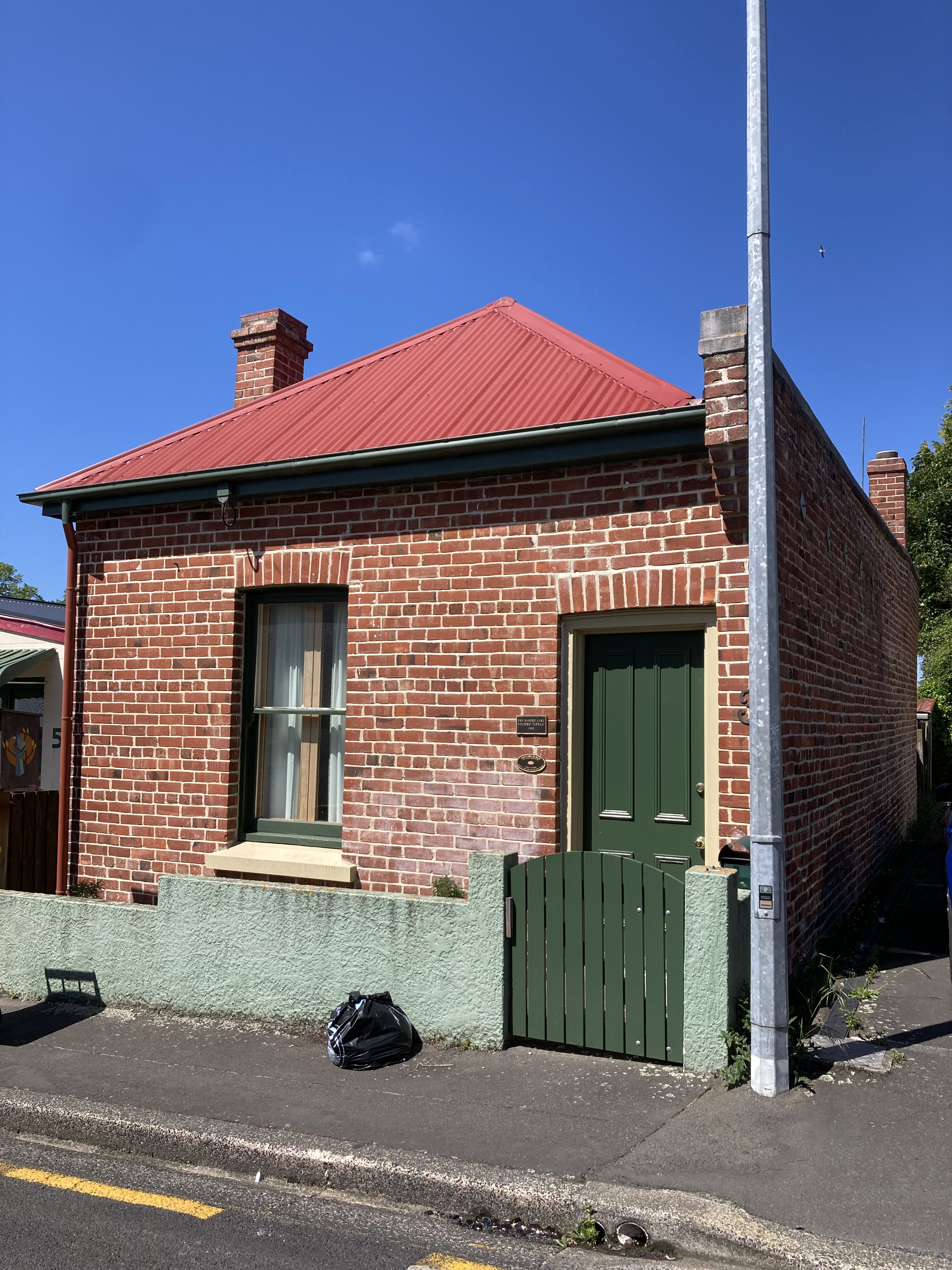
Robert Lord Writer's Cottage in 2023

The University of Otago College of Education/Creative New Zealand Children's Writer in Residence is a six-month Fellowship for children's writers who normally live in New Zealand.

== History and conditions ==
This residency was first offered in 1992 when it was run by the Dunedin College of Education, with Ruth Corrin being the first recipient. It is the only such residency offered to a children's writer by any tertiary institution in New Zealand, and is awarded for a six-month period between February and August each year. The award includes a stipend of $28,000 (funded by the University of Otago and Creative New Zealand) and the use of an office within the College of Education.

In 2017, Dunedin UNESCO City of Literature won a bid for a free stand at the Bologna Children's Book Fair, and writers who had held the University of Otago College of Education Creative New Zealand Children's Writing Residency were highlighted and celebrated in the display.

In 2025 it was announced that Creative New Zealand had declined further funding, putting the future of the residency in doubt." The university self-funded the 2025 residency, as it had already been awarded to Samantha Montgomerie when the funding decision was notified. No fellowship was offered in 2026, and the university instead launched a fundraising drive to build an endowment fund to support the fellowship, intending to offer it again from 2027.

== The Robert Lord Cottage ==
The recipient of the residency has the option, if wanted, of rent-free accommodation in the Robert Lord Cottage. This hundred-year-old brick cottage at 3 Titan Street, Dunedin North, was once owned by New Zealand playwright Robert Lord. Before his death in 1992, Lord set up the ‘Writers Cottage Trust’ with the aim of allowing the cottage to be used in the future as a rent-free home for writers-in-residence.

== Recipients ==
During her residency, Diana Noonan wrote for the School Journal, later becoming its editor, and Leonie Agnew was inspired to set her 2021 novel The Memory Thief in Dunedin's Botanic Garden. Swapna Haddow wrote three picture books, a junior novel and a middle grade novel during her fellowship. Ella West used her residency to write Night Vision, which won the Children's Choice (Young Adult) award in 2015.

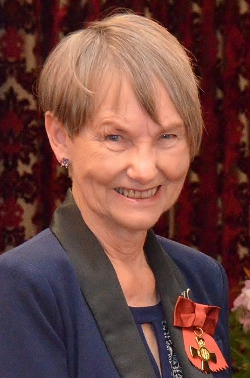
Fleur Beale

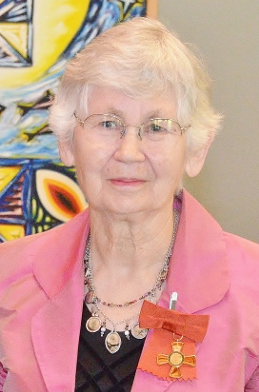
Jennifer Beck

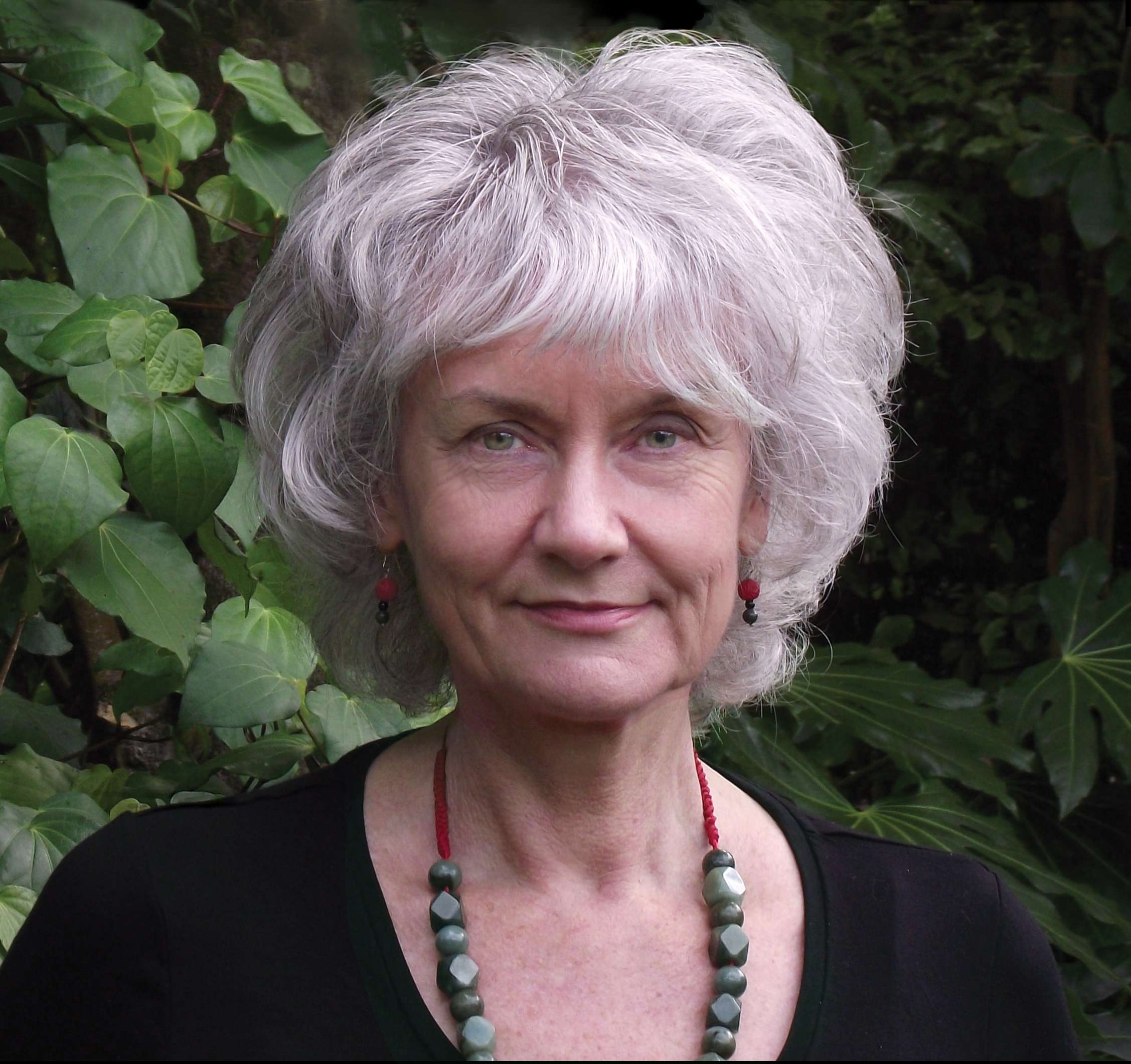
Barbara Else

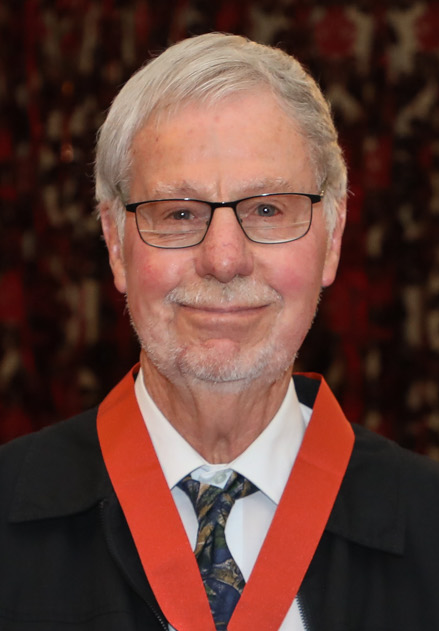
David Hill

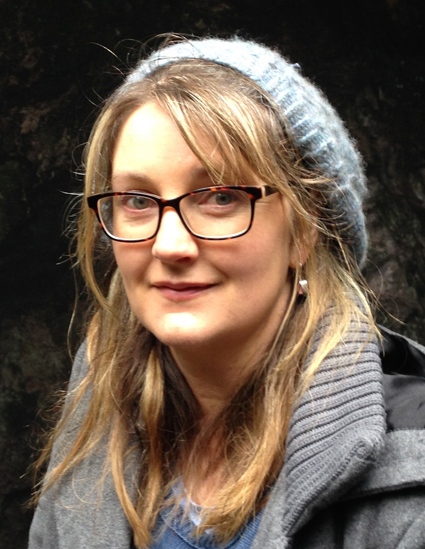
Ruth Paul

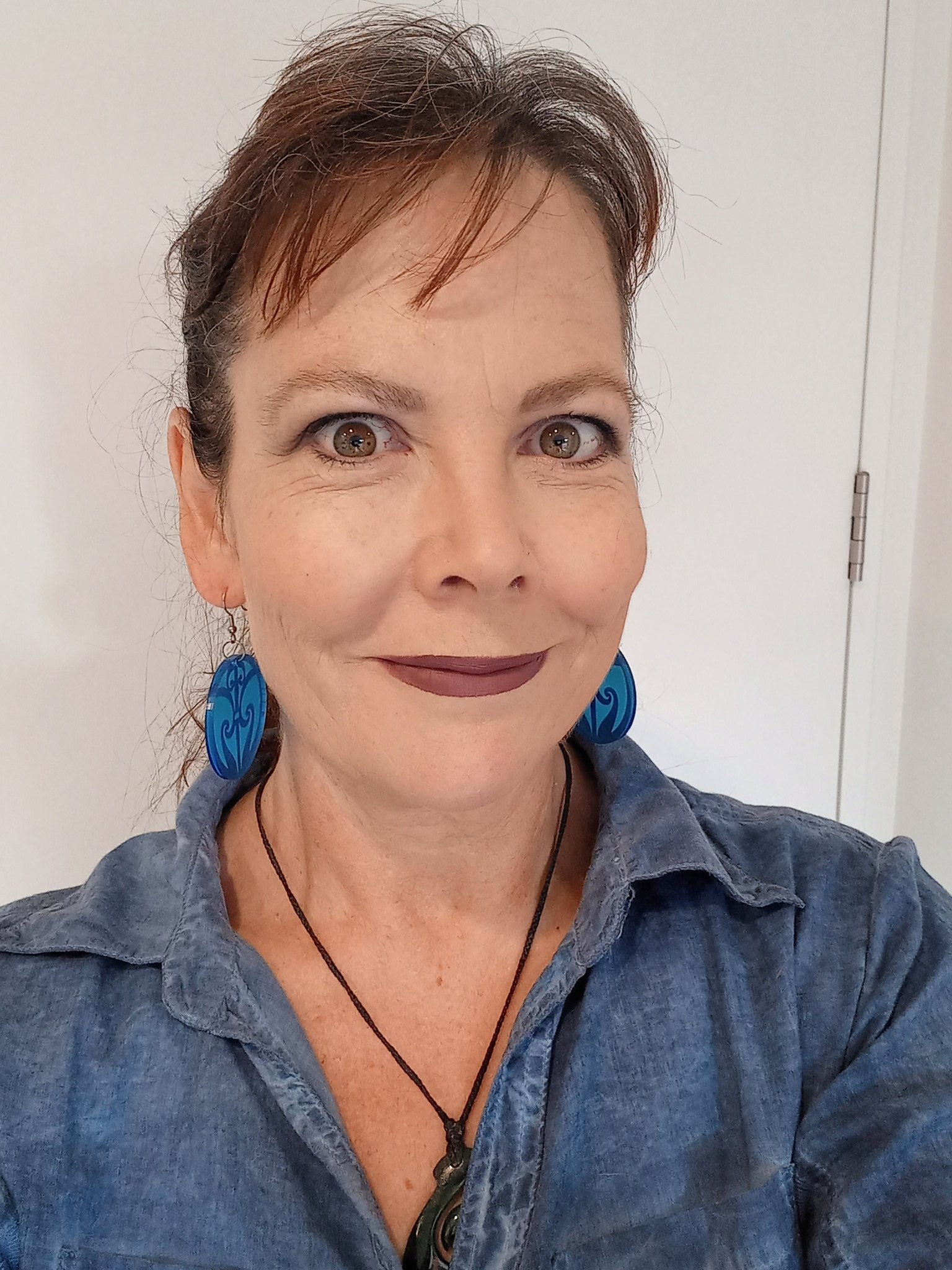
Tania Roxborogh

The writers who have been the Otago College of Education / Creative New Zealand Children's Writer in Residence are as follows:

1992	Ruth Corrin
1993	Diana Noonan
1994	Paula Boock
1995	Jack Lasenby
1996	Ken Catran
1997	Katerina Te Heikoko Mataira
1998	Janice Marriott and William Taylor
1999	Fleur Beale
2000	David Elliot
2001	Penelope Todd
2002	Sandy McKay
2003	Pauline Cartwright and David Hill
2004	Brigid Lowry
2005	Margaret Beames and Shirley Corlett
2006	Tania Roxborogh
2007	Vincent Ford
2008	Bill O'Brien
2009	Joanna Orwin
2010	Karen Trebilcock (Ella West)
2011	Kyle Mewburn
2012	James Norcliffe
2013	Leonie Agnew
2014	Melinda Szymanik
2015	Jennifer Beck and Robyn Belton
2016	Barbara Else
2017	Mere Whaanga
2018	Raymond Huber
2019	Fifi Colston
2020	Elena de Roo
2021	Heather McQuillan
2022	Swapna Haddow
2023	Ruth Paul
2024	Feana Tu'akoi
2025	Samantha Montgomerie
2026	No fellowship offered

== See also ==
- Robert Burns Fellowship
