= Louise Orwin =

British performance artist

Louise Orwin is a performance artist who makes research-based performance and video projects about what it means to identify as a queer femme, in a world that prizes masculinity, straightness and whiteness. A performer-playwright who uses writing, live performance and video, Orwin has created several theatre shows that have toured internationally to performance spaces, galleries and festivals.

== Career ==
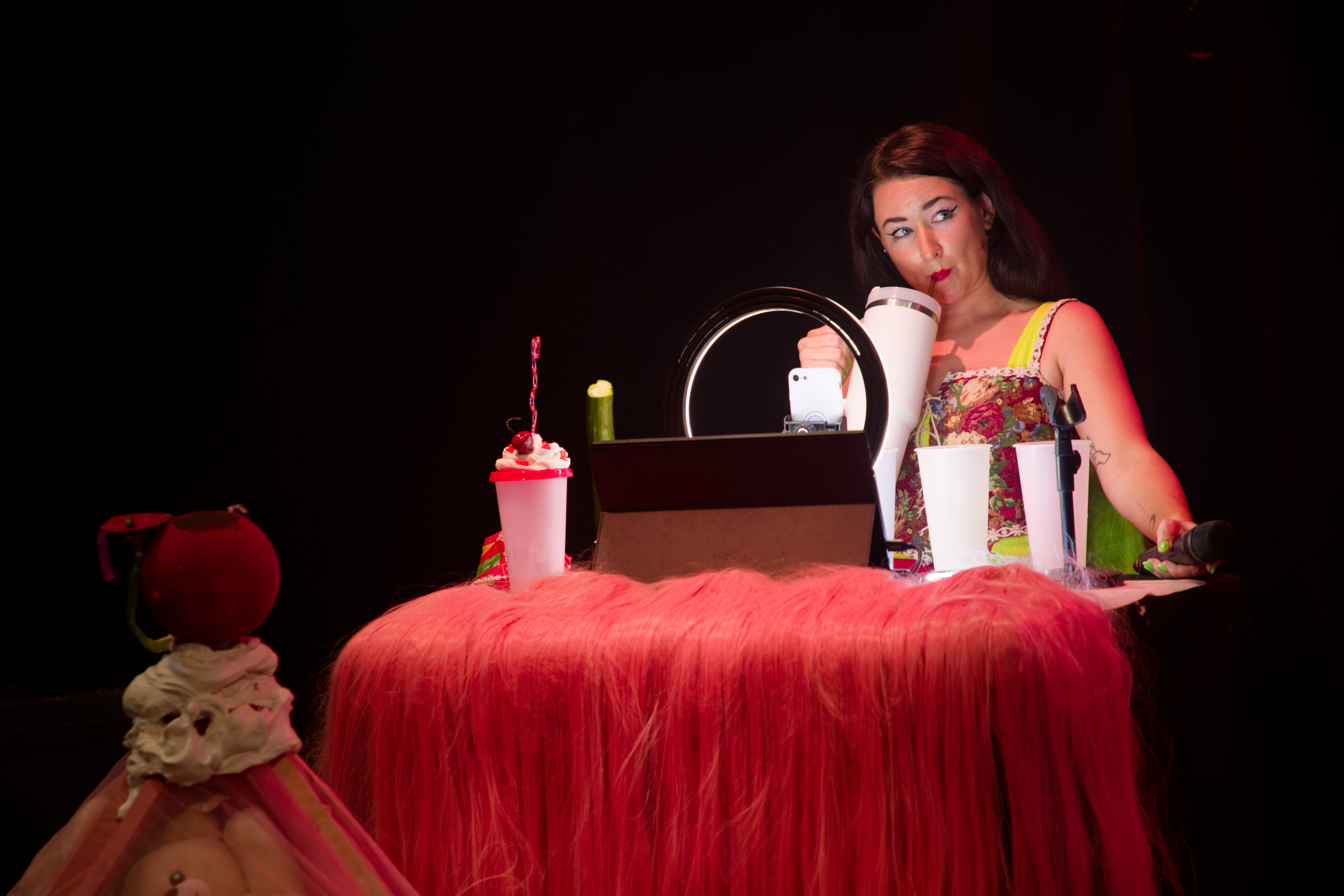
Orwin performing Famehungry at Edinburgh Festival Fringe 2024

A Girl and A Gun 2016 toured the Edinburgh Fringe Festival in 2016. The Norwich Radical reviewed Louise's show when it toured to NorwichArtsCentre "The brilliance of Orwin’s piece: a play without a narrative, but driven by an over-arching narrative that is so blindingly obvious we never thought to question it."

Oh Yes Oh No - 2017 - 2019 LondonTheatre1 reviewed the show in 2017 giving it 4 stars. "Louise Orwin’s Oh Yes Oh No is certainly a piece to be talked about… once you’ve found the words." Orwin draws from recorded interviews with victims which were then played out throughout the performance. Mike Levy from The Cambridge Critique stated "These disembodied voices contributed to the stunning tapestry of sound and light. It was as I said a tough watch".

During 2020 Orwin created an online digital work, Ur Favourite Scary Movie. Giving 4 stars by The Crumb, London, Isabelle Tyner reviewed the work, "Orwin confronts many traditions of scary movies, naming the cliches and plots of ones that came before". Tyner concluded that "with gritty spoken word and detailed sound effects Ur Favourite Scary Movie provides a refreshing perspective on horror, as well as a psychological journey".

In 2024, Orwin brought a show called Famehungry to the Edinburgh Fringe Festival, which was a multi-media commentary on the quest for attention on Tiktok.

== Theatre shows ==
- 2013 Pretty Ugly
- 2015 A Girl and A Gun
- 2017 - 2019 OH YES OH NO
- 2018 CRY CRY KILL KILL
- 2024 Famehungry

== Digital work ==
- Ur Favourite Scary Movie

== Personal life ==
Orwin lives in London.
