= Tom Fitzgibbon Award =

Storylines Tom Fitzgibbon Award
- Sponsored by: Storylines
- Country: New Zealand
- Reward: NZ$1,500
- First award: 1996
- Website: Official website

The Storylines Tom Fitzgibbon Award is a New Zealand award for writers of children's literature. The award is open only to previously unpublished writers for an original work of fiction intended for children between 7 and 13 years of age. It is given annually, when merited, to the author in partnership with Scholastic NZ.

== About ==
The Tom Fitzgibbon Award (officially known as the Storylines Tom Fitzgibbon Award) is a New Zealand literature award for previously unpublished writers who have written a manuscript for children aged between 7 and 13 years of age. The award comes with a cash prize, and the offer of publication (through Scholastic NZ).

== Eligibility ==
To be eligible for the award, the entrant cannot have had any work of fiction published in print or digital format (provisos exist for small-run self-published works, and smaller pieces in magazines and journals).

== Winners ==
Year	Author	Title
1996	Iona McNaughton	Summer of Shadows
1997	Heather Cato	Dark Horses
1998	Vince Ford	2MUCH4U
1999	Shirley Corlett	The Stolen
2000	Alison Robertson	Knocked for Six
2001	no award	
2002	Janet Pates	Mystery at Tui Bay
2003	Jillian Sullivan	Shreve's Promise
2004	Brigid Feehan	Stella Star
2005	Heather McQuillan	Mind Over Matter
2006	Vicki Simpson	Yo, Shark Bait!
2007	Kris Stanhope (published as Michael Fartarsky)	Why I Hate School
2008	Elizabeth Hegarty	Salt River
2009	Anna Gowan	Hollie Chips
2010	Leonie Agnew	Super Finn
2011	Kathy Taylor	Iris's Ukulele
2012	no award	
2013	Juliet Jacka	The Night of the Perigee Moon
2014	Suzanne Main	How I Alienated My Grandma
2015	Tom E. Moffatt	Barking Mad
2016	Anne Kayes	Tui Street Tales
2017	Christine Walker	The Short But Brilliant Career of Lucas Weed
2018	James T. Guthrie	Bullseye Bella
2019	no award	
2020	Belinda O'Keefe	A Recipe for Disaster published as Partners in Slime
2021	Carol Garden	Kidnap at Mystery Island
2022	Feana Tu’akoi	A Perfect Failure, published as Lopini the Legend
2023	Claire Aramakutu	Koro's Star
