= Joanna Orwin =

New Zealand writer (born 1944)

- Born: 28 November 1944 (age 81); Nelson, New Zealand
- Occupation: Writer
- Spouse: Donald Orwin (m. 1968; died 1989)
- Children: 3
- Writing career
- Language: English
- Genres: Novels, non-fiction, children's fiction
- Website: joannaorwin.com

Joanna Orwin (née Lucas; born 28 November 1944) is a New Zealand writer of fiction and non-fiction for adults and children. Several of her books have been shortlisted for or have won awards, including Children's Book of the Year in 1985 and the Senior Fiction category of the New Zealand Post Book awards for Children and Young Adults in 2002. She lives in Christchurch, New Zealand.

== Biography ==
Joanna Orwin was born on 28 November 1944 in Nelson. Her father Richard Arthur Lucas was an ear, nose, and throat specialist. She grew up in Nelson and family holidays at Lake Rotoiti helped to inspire her love of the New Zealand landscape.

She cites some of her favourite childhood reading as myths and legends, adventure stories like Treasure Island and Swallows and Amazons, historical fiction by Rosemary Sutcliff, Henry Treece and Geoffrey Trease and fantasy such as The Chronicles of Narnia, At the Back of the North Wind, and The Jungle Book.

She won prizes for poetry and essay writing at Nelson College for Girls, but went on to study botany and physical geography at university, graduating with a BSc (Hons) in botany, and worked for the New Zealand Forest Service as a plant ecologist and a science editor. Later she also worked as a consultant researcher, writer, and editor.

Her writing includes scientific papers, articles for Te Ara, non-fiction history texts, novels for children and young adults and short stories in anthologies such as Down to the Sea Again (HarperCollins, 2005) and the Annual (Gecko Press, 2016). Her novels often carry underlying themes of the natural environment, New Zealand history, flora and fauna and Māori folklore and heritage, and they are informed by her knowledge of geology and the landscape. The Ihaka novels are set in Delaware Bay, near Nelson. Guardian of the Land is set in Kaikōura and The Watcher in the Forest is set in the area around Murchison and Lewis Pass.

She received history grants for her two adult non-fiction books. Riccarton and the Deans Family: History and Heritage was shortlisted for the 2016 New Zealand Heritage Book and Writing Awards.

Several of her children's books have been shortlisted for the New Zealand Book Awards for Children and Young Adults or named as Storylines Notable Books. Her two Ihaka novels were among the books mentioned by Tessa Duder in an article on the history of children's literature in New Zealand.

Orwin married wool scientist Donald Francis Ginn Orwin in 1968. They had three children. Her husband died in 1989. She currently lives in Christchurch.

== Awards and prizes ==
In 2009, Joanna Orwin was the University of Otago College of Education / Creative New Zealand Children's Writer in Residence.

The Guardian of the Land won the Children's Book of the Year Award in 1985. Owl won the Senior Fiction category of the New Zealand Post Book Awards for Children and Young Adults in 2002.

== Bibliography ==
Adult non-fiction

Four Generations from Maoridom: The Memoirs of Syd Cormack As Told to Joanna Orwin (Otago University Press, 1997)

Kauri: Witness to a Nation's History (New Holland, 2004)

Riccarton and the Deans family: History and Heritage (Bateman Publishing, 2015)

Adult fiction

Shifting Currents (Joanna Orwin, 2020)

Collision (HarperCollins, 2009)

Children's and Young Adult fiction

Ihaka and the Summer Wandering, illustrated by Robyn Kahukiwa (Oxford University Press, 1982)

Ihaka and the Prophecy, ill. Robyn Kahukiwa (Oxford University Press, 1984)

The Guardian of the Land (Oxford University Press, 1985) reprinted in the Collins Modern New Zealand Classic series (Harper Collins, 2005)

Watcher in the Forest (Oxford University Press, 1987)

The Tar Dragon, ill. Wendy Hodder (Scholastic, 1997)

Owl (Longacre Press, 2001)

Out of Tune (Longacre Press, 2004)

Kauri in My Blood: The Diary of Laura Ann Findlay, the Coromandel, 1921–24 [My Story series] (Scholastic, 2007)

Sacrifice (HarperCollins, 2011)
