= Tania Roxborogh =

New Zealand writer

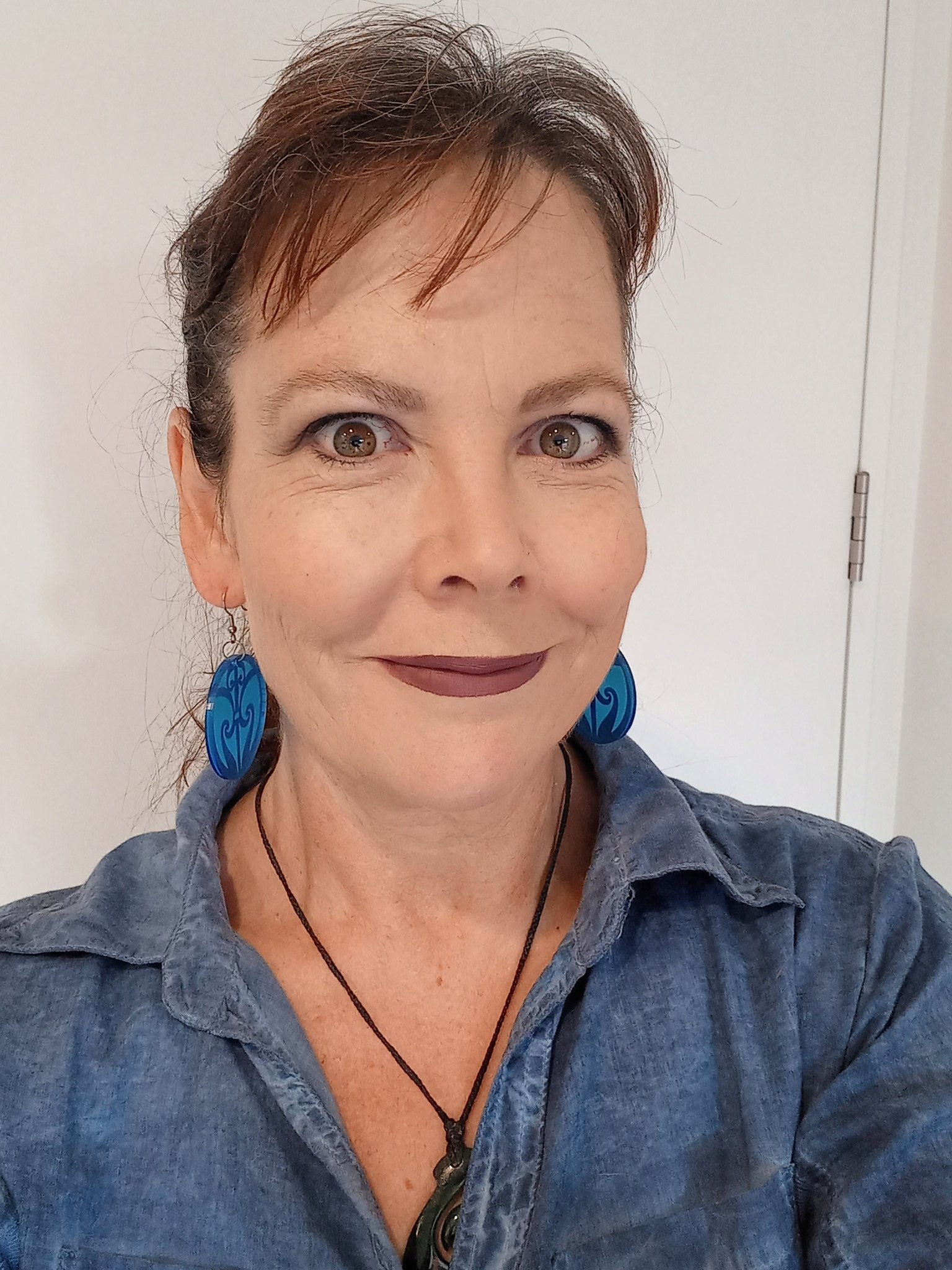
- Born: Tania Kelly Roxborogh; 1 September 1965 (age 61); Christchurch, New Zealand
- Occupations: Teacher, author
- Years active: 1989–present
- Spouse: Phillip Roxborogh (1989–present)
- Children: 2

Tania Kelly Roxborogh (born 1 September 1965) is a New Zealand author who currently lives in Lincoln, Canterbury. Roxborogh is of Māori (Ngāti Porou and Ngāti Mutunga o Wharekuri), Irish (Kelly clan, Tipperary) and Scottish (Watson clan) descent. She is the author of over 30 books, including Third Degree, Twenty Minute Shakespeare, and Fat Like Me and The Banquo's Son Trilogy. She also teaches English at the local high school. In 2021, her novel Charlie Tangaroa and the Creature from the Sea won the supreme award, the Margaret Mahy Book of the year.

== Early life and education ==
Tania Roxborogh was born in Christchurch. When she was three years old, her alcoholic father left home and she moved to Te Puke with her mother. In 1985, Roxborogh began studying at Massey University in Palmerston North. Three years later, she went to Auckland Teachers' College and the following year began teaching English.

In 2015, she graduated from the University of Otago with a second B.A. This time in Māori Studies. She began learning te reo Māori in 2012 and is currently working towards a PhD in Mātauranga Māori (Māori knowledge). The focus of her research is the decolonisation of the teaching of Shakespeare through mana ōrite mō te mātauranga Māori (equal status for Māori Knowledge) with a focus on the similarities between the imagery of the natural world used in Shakespeare's plays and 'Māori whakataukī' and 'whakatauakī'.

== Marriage and children ==
In December 1989, she married Phillip Roxborogh. She has two daughters, born in 1992 and 1996.

== Other ==
- In 2002, Roxborogh sat the Bursary English exam after a challenge from her Year 13 class as she had not taken it herself before and was taking her students through it.
- In 2003, she underwent a gastric bypass operation after struggling with a serious weight problem as a result of her pregnancies and has been a vocal advocate for the positive results of the procedure.
- In 2006, she was awarded the Dunedin College of Education's Children's Writer in Residence which led to the family relocating from Auckland to Dunedin.
- In 2010, her novel, Banquo's Son, was shortlisted for the New Zealand Post Children's Book Awards, awarded a notable book from Storylines: the Children's Literature Foundation of New Zealand, as well as winning the YA section of the 2010 LIANZA awards.
- Roxborogh's novel, Bastion Point, won the junior fiction category in the 2017 Book Awards for Children and Young Adults.
- Roxborogh's 2020 novel, Charlie Tangaroa and the Creature from the Sea, was awarded the Wright Family Foundation Esther Glen Award for Junior Fiction in the 2021 NZ Book Awards for Children and Young Adults.

== Content and style of writing ==
Roxborogh's earlier works contain much biographical material. Many of the situations her characters find themselves dealing with are sourced from specific events in her own life. For example, the car accident Jeremy suffered in Runaway is exactly what she experienced. In Third Degree, a story about a 19-year-old university student Ruth, memories of a 10-year-old self are lifted straight from the memories of the time Roxborogh ran into her stepfather who was carrying a pot of boiling hot water. She was scalded very badly and suffered third degree burns. During her time in hospital she was not just scarred physically but was also subjected to a medical experiment.

Recently, her work has reflected her growing understanding of te ao Māori (the Māori world).

Roxborogh's parenting books (No, It's Not Okay and Kids Behaving Bravely) reflect her observations and research associated with teaching adolescents. These two she co-authored with guidance counseller Kim Stephenson.

== Philosophical and/or political views ==
Roxborogh is a non-denominational Christian. Her brother-in-law John Roxborogh is a theologian.

Her motto for life is best said in Langston Hughes' poem 'Dreams': "Hold fast to dreams for if dreams die, life is a broken-winged bird that cannot fly..."

== Bibliography ==
- Performing with Purpose (1996)
- Fifteen Minute Shakespeare (1997)
- If I Could Tell You... (1997)
- Three Funny Plays (1997)
- Twenty Minute Shakespeare (1998)
- Grit (1998)
- Runaway (1998)
- Compulsion (1999)
- English Basics (1999)
- Three Spooky Plays (1999)
- More English Basics (2000)
- Whispers (2002)
- Limelight (2002)
- The Essential Shakespeare Series: The Merchant of Venice (2002)
- The Ring (2002)
- Third Degree (2005)
- Fat Like Me (2005)
- The Essential Shakespeare Series: Macbeth
- The Essential Shakespeare Series: The Tempest with Jillian Gamble
- No, It's Not Okay: How To Stop the Cycle of Bullying (2007) with Kim Stephenson
- Kids Behaving Bravely: Raising a Resilient Child (2008) with Kim Stephenson
- Space Gum (2008)
- Banquo's Son (2009)
- Bloodlines (2010)
- Birthright (2013)
- Bastion Point (2017)
- Getting Familiar with Unfamiliar NCEA English Level 1 Workbook (2017) with Kathryn Fitzgerald
- Getting Familiar with Unfamiliar NCEA English Level 2 Workbook (2018) with Kathryn Fitzgerald
- Serious Fun in English Book 1 Workbook (2019) with Kathryn Fitzgerald
- Getting Familiar with Unfamiliar NCEA English Level 3 Workbook (2020) with Kathryn Fitzgerald
- Charlie Tangaroa and the Creature from the Sea (2020)
