= Fleur Beale =

Young adult novelist

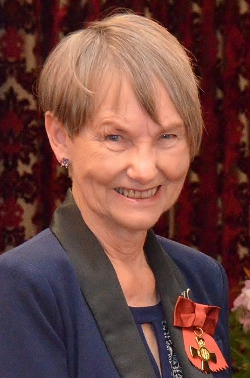
- Beale in 2015
- Born: Fleur Una Maude Corney; 1945 (age 80–81)
- Education: Victoria University, Wellington; Christchurch Teachers' College
- Occupation: Writer
- Spouse: Timothy Gerald Beale
- Writing career
- Language: English
- Notable work: I Am Not Esther
- Notable awards: 2015 New Year Honours, Officer of the New Zealand Order of Merit

Fleur Una Maude Beale ONZM (née Corney, born 22 February 1945) is a New Zealand teenage fiction writer, best known for her novel I Am Not Esther, which has been published worldwide.

== Early life and education ==
Beale was one of six children of a dairy farmer, Cedric Corney, and of a teacher and author, Estelle Corney (née Cook). She was born in Inglewood, Taranaki, New Zealand, on the farm where her father was born. Beale grew up in the town and attended Inglewood High School From 1958, before attending Victoria University, Wellington and Christchurch Teachers' College, where she met her husband, Tim (Timothy Gerald Beale).

== Career ==
She taught at Melville High School in Hamilton from the mid 1980s to the late 1990s. Beale's first stories were written for the children's radio programme Grandpa's Place. Her first book was a small reader and picture book for young children and she started to write for teenagers in 1993. Her stories often involve troubled adolescents engaged in outdoor activities.

Beale was a finalist in the AIM Children's Book Awards (junior fiction) and her 1998 novel I Am Not Esther was shortlisted for the senior fiction section of the 1999 New Zealand Post Children's Book Awards. In 1999 she was awarded the Children's Writing Fellowship at Dunedin College of Education and quit teaching to write full-time. Her 2001 novel Ambushed was a finalist for the Junior Fiction section of the 2002 New Zealand Post Children's Book Awards. Her 2004 account of how an indigenous girl discovers how her education can save her tribal lands (My Story A New Song in the Land. The Writings of Atapo, Pahia, c.1840) received a Storylines Notable Book Award in 2005, as did Walking Lightly. In 2012, Beale became the last recipient of the Margaret Mahy Award during Margaret Mahy's lifetime.

In the 2015 New Year Honours, Beale was appointed an Officer of the New Zealand Order of Merit for services to literature.

== Printed works ==
- The Great Pumpkin Battle (1988), Shortland
- A Surprise for Anna (1990), Cocky's Circle
- Slide the Corner (1992), Scholastic
- Against the Tide (1993), HarperCollins
- Driving a Bargain (1993), HarperCollins
- Over the Edge (1994), Scholastic
- The Fortune Teller (1995), HarperCollins
- Dear Pop (1995), Land's End
- The Rich and Famous Body and the Empty Chequebook (1995), Land's End
- Fifteen and Screaming (1996), HarperCollins
- Rockman (1996), HarperCollins
- Further Back than Zero (1998), Scholastic
- Keep Out (1999), Learning Media
- Destination Disaster (1999), Shortland
- Playing to Win (2000), Scholastic
- Trucker (2000), Learning Media
- Deadly Prospect (2000), Scholastic
- Ambushed (2000), Scholastic
- Seven readers for Pearson Education, Singapore (2001)
- Lucky for Some (2002), Scholastic
- Red Dog in Bandit Country (2003), Longacre [non-fiction]
- Lacey and the Drama Queens (2004), Scholastic
- My Story A New Song in the Land. The Writings of Atapo, Pahia, c.1840 (2004), Scholastic
- Walking Lightly (2004), Mallinson Rendel
- A Respectable Girl (2006), Random House
- The Transformation of Minna Hargreaves (2007), Random House
- My Life of Crime (2007), Mallinson Rendel
- Slide the Corner (2007), Scholastic
- End of the Alphabet (2009), Random House
- Dirt Bomb (2011), Random House
- The Juno series:
  - Juno of Taris (2008)
  - Fierce September (2010)
  - Heart of Danger (2011)
- I Am Not Esther
  - I Am Not Esther (1998), ISBN 0-7868-0845-4
  - I am Rebecca (2014), ISBN 978-1-77553-549-2
  - Being Magdalene (2015), Random House
- Lyla: Through My Eyes (Allen & Unwin, 2018)
- The Calling (Penguin, 2021)
- Faraway Girl (Penguin, 2022)
- Once Upon a Wickedness (Penguin, 2023)
