= Janice Marriott =

New Zealand writer (b. 1946)

- Born: 3 October 1946 (age 80)
- Occupation: Writer
- Website: janicemarriott.com

Janice Marriott is a writer, editor, audio producer, screenwriter, creative writing tutor and mentor, manuscript assessor, poet and gardener. Several of her books have been shortlisted for or won awards and she has also been the recipient of a number of writing residencies, as well as the prestigious Margaret Mahy Medal in 2018. She lives in Auckland, New Zealand.

== Biography ==
Janice Marriott was born on 3 October 1946 in England. She lists some of her favourite childhood books as The Wind in the Willows, The Jungle Book, Black Beauty, Lassie, and Enid Blyton's Secret Seven and Famous Five series.

She attended school in Napier and Gisborne, studied at Victoria University of Wellington and took a course in rare books librarianship in San Francisco. She worked in radio and television in California and Vancouver. Later she graduated from the Wellington College of Education. In 1983, she left teaching and began work producing audio books for Learning Media.

Since the publication of her first children's book in 1989, she has written fiction and non-fiction for children and young adults, radio plays, documentaries and scripts for episodes of the TV series The WotWots. Her work includes many educational texts for various publishers as well as stories and articles in magazines and anthologies.

More recently, she shifted from Wellington to Auckland to be closer to her family and to spend more time with her grandson.

She is a tutor for the New Zealand Institute of Business Studies (NZIBS) in the Writing Stories for Children and Poetry courses and a member of the New Zealand Association of Manuscript Assessors (NZAMA). She tutors beginning writers through her online courses Go Write Now and writes poetry on her poetry blog.

== Awards and prizes ==
In 1994, Janice was the inaugural writer-in-residence at the Auckland College of Education. She was University of Otago College of Education Writer in Residence 1997 and was awarded the Foxton Fellowship in 2001. Janice was the 2018 recipient of the Margaret Mahy Medal, giving her lecture in Auckland on 8 April 2018.

She won the 1996 Aim Supreme Award and Senior Fiction Award and the Esther Glen award with Crossroads. In 2007 her book Thor’s tale won the Junior Fiction Category of the New Zealand Post Children's Book Awards. She was also a finalist in the Non-Fiction section with Soldier in the Yellow Socks.

Several of her books have been named as Storylines Notable Books. Janice is also a keen gardener and was shortlisted for Columnist of the Year 2011 for her gardening column in House and Garden magazine.

== Bibliography ==
Children's fiction:

Letters to Lesley (Omnibus/Puffin, 1989)

Brain Drain (Ashton Scholastic, 1993

I'm Not a Compost Heap (HarperCollins, 1995)

Crossroads (Reed, 1995)

Hope's Rainbow (Puffin, 1996)

Carmen's Story (Shortland Street Books, 1996)

Kissing Fish (Puffin, 1997)

Thor's Tale: Endurance and Adventure in the Southern Ocean (HarperCollins, 2006)

Chute Thru (Mallinson Rendel, 2006)

Taking Off (Harper Collins, 2007)

Bute View (Mallinson Rendel, 2009)

Monstrosity [Monster series in one volume] (HarperCollins 2010)

The "Monster" series:

Green Slime Dinner Time (HarperCollins, 1997)

The B4 Battle (HarperCollins, 1997)

The Big Bug Blast (HarperCollins, 1997)

Alien on Wheels (HarperCollins, 1997)

Children's non-fiction:

Soldier in the Yellow Socks: Charles Upham, Our Finest Fighting Soldier, illustrated by Bruce Potter (HarperCollins 2006)

Yates Gardening for Kids illustrated by Elena Petrov (HarperCollins, 2002)

Growing Things to Eat (HarperCollins, 2003)

Yates Young Gardener: Get Your Hands Dirty (HarperCollins, 2011)

Stories in the following anthologies:

Nearly Seventeen (Penguin, 1993)

Personal Best (Reed Australia, 1997)

Thirty New Zealand Stories for children (Random House, 2002)

The Great Pavlova Cover Up (Cumulus, 2001)

Claws and Jaws (Random House, 2004)

Mischief and Mayhem (Random House, 2005)

Great Mates (Random House, 2011)

Memoir (all co-authored with Virginia Pawsey):

Common Ground (HarperCollins, 2008)

Common Table (HarperCollins, 2010)

Common Lives (HarperCollins, 2012)

Changing Lives (HarperCollins, 2015)
