= Alison Robertson =

New Zealand writer and journalist

Alison Robertson (born 19 March 1958) is a New Zealand writer and journalist. Her manuscript Knocked for Six won the Tom Fitzgibbon Award in 2000 and was published the following year.

== Life ==
Robertson was born and grew up in Napier. She moved to Wellington for her tertiary studies, completing a diploma in journalism at Wellington Polytechnic in 1976. She worked as a sports reporter for Radio New Zealand until 1986, when she became a freelance writer. She writes short stories and non-fiction texts for Pearson Education and other educational publishers. In 2000 her manuscript for Knocked for Six won the Tom Fitzgibbon Award and was published in 2001. The novel also received the Esther Glen Award at the 2002 LIANZA Children's Book Awards.

== Publications ==
- Connecting Cultures (ESOL Home Tutor Scheme, 1999)
- Know You’re Talking (ESOL Home Tutor Scheme, 2000)
- Knocked for Six (Scholastic, 2001)
- Finding Isabella (Scholastic, 2005)
- Rocket Shoes (Pearson Education, 2011)
