= NZSA Peter & Dianne Beatson Fellowship =

New Zealand literary fellowship

The NZSA Peter & Dianne Beatson Fellowship (known informally as the Foxton Fellowship) is an annual literary fellowship in New Zealand established by Peter and Dianne Beatson in 2001.

== History and conditions ==
The fellowship was set up by Peter and Dianne Beatson in 2001 as a way of supporting New Zealand writers and writing, and has previously included the option of a month's residency at the Beatsons’ holiday house at Foxton Beach.

It is open to writers of fiction, non-fiction, poetry and drama. Applicants must be members of the New Zealand Society of Authors (NZSA) and need to show that they are working on a new project which has a high level of literary merit and national significance. The successful applicant receives a stipend of $10,000, increased to $12,000 in 2026.

The fellowship has also been known as the Foxton Fellowship or the Beatson Fellowship. The first recipients were Janice Marriott ( 2001–2002), Chris Else (2002–2003), Marilyn Duckworth (2003–2004), Sue McCauley (2004–2005), Jackie Davis (2005–2006), Paddy Richardson (2006–2007), Norman Bilbrough (2007–2008), Jo Randerson (2008–2009) and Glenn Colquhoun (2009–2010).

== The benefactors ==
Peter Beatson was born in Christchurch, New Zealand, in 1942. After studying at the University of Canterbury, he was awarded doctorates in English literature from Cambridge University (1974) and in sociology from the University of Provence (1978) and lectured in sociology at Massey University, Palmerston North, from 1978 to 2006. In recognition of his contribution to the literary arts sector in New Zealand, he was elected the President of Honour of the New Zealand Society of Authors in 2004–2005.

Dianne Beatson was a teacher and author. She died in November 2013. Sunset at the Estuary was published as a tribute to her in 2015.

== Recipients since 2010 ==
- 2010–2011 Carl Nixon
- 2011–2012 Catherine Chidgey
- 2012–2013 Mandy Hager
- 2013–2014 Diane Brown
- 2014–2015 Emma Neale
- 2015–2016 Michael Harlow
- 2016–2017 Tina Makereti
- 2017–2018 Jillian Sullivan
- 2018–2019 Sue Wootton
- 2019–2020 Frankie McMillan
- 2020–2021 Siobhan Harvey
- 2021–2022 Whiti Hereaka
- 2022–2023 Tim Jones
- 2023–2024 Laurence Fearnley
- 2024–2025 Jacqueline Leckie
- 2025–2026 Breton Dukes
- 2026–2026 Lawrence Patchett
