= Laurence Fearnley =

New Zealand writer (born 1963)

- Born: 1963 (age 62–63)
- Occupation: writer
- Awards: Robert Burns Fellowship

Academic background
- Education: Victoria University of Wellington
- Thesis: Boden Black (A Novel) and With Axe and Pen in the New Zealand Alps: Differences Between Overseas and New Zealand Written Accounts of Climbing Mount Cook 1882-1920 and the Emergence of a New Zealand Voice in Mountaineering Literature (2012)
- Doctoral advisor: Bill Manhire; John Thomson

Laurence Fearnley (born 1963) is a New Zealand short-story writer, novelist and non-fiction writer. Several of her books have been shortlisted for or have won awards, both in New Zealand and overseas, including The Hut Builder, which won the fiction category of the 2011 NZ Post Book Awards. She has also been the recipient of a number of writing awards and residencies including the Robert Burns Fellowship, the Janet Frame Memorial Award and the Artists to Antarctica Programme.

== Biography ==
Laurence Fearnley was born in 1963. Her parents emigrated from England to New Zealand. She grew up in Christchurch, travelled to Europe and later lived in Wellington where she worked as a curator in art galleries and museums.

She has an MA and a PhD in Creative Writing (2012) from the International Institute of Modern Letters at Victoria University of Wellington. For her thesis, she looked at accounts of the first attempts to climb Aoraki/Mount Cook.

Her books, including her trilogy Butler's Ringlet, Edwin and Matilda and Mother's Day, have a strong sense of landscape and are often set in small towns of Southland and Central Otago in southern New Zealand. Her short stories have been broadcast on the radio and published in anthologies and in literary journals, including Sport and Landfall.

== Awards and prizes ==
Fearnley has received a number of awards and grants for her writing and several of her books have been shortlisted for or have won awards. Room was shortlisted for the 2001 Montana New Zealand Book Awards. Edwin and Matilda was longlisted for the Dublin Prize in 2008 and was also runner-up in the fiction category of the 2008 Montana New Zealand Book Awards. The Hut Builder won the fiction category of the 2011 NZ Post Book Awards and was shortlisted for the 2010 Boardman Tasker Prize for Mountain Literature. Going Up is Easy was a finalist in the 2015 Banff Mountain Literature Award. Reach was longlisted for the 2016 Ockham New Zealand Book Awards.

Fearnley has been twice to Antarctica, first as an Arts Fellow under the Artists to Antarctica Programme in January 2004 (her book Degrees of Separation draws on this experience) and again as a tutor with students of the Graduate Certificate in Antarctic Studies from the University of Canterbury in December 2005. She spent a month in 2006 at the Island of Residencies fellowship in Tasmania and held the Robert Burns Fellowship in 2007.

In 2014, she took part in Roadwords, a literary tour of southern South Island towns, with three other writers: Pip Adam, Tina Makereti and Lawrence Patchett, who met each other when they were all studying for PhDs at Victoria University.

In 2016 she received the NZSA Janet Frame Memorial Award, the NZSA / Auckland Museum Research Grant and the Friends of the Hocken Collections Award.

She was joint winner of the 2017 Landfall Essay Competition for her essay 'Perfume Counter'.

She has taken part in several literary festivals including the Nelson Arts Festival, Tauranga Arts Festival and Word Christchurch 2018.

Fearnley was awarded the NZSA Peter and Dianne Beatson Fellowship for 2023–2024.

In 2025 her book At the Grand Glacier Hotel was a finalist for the Jann Medlicott Acorn Prize for Fiction at the Ockham New Zealand Book Awards and made longlist for the International Dublin Literary Award.

== Bibliography ==
- The Sound of Her Body (Hazard Press, 1998)
- Room (Victoria University Press, 2000)
- Delphine’s Run (Penguin, 2003)
- Butler's Ringlet (Penguin, 2004)
- Degrees of Separation (Penguin, 2006)
- Edwin and Matilda (Penguin, 2007)
- Mother's Day (Penguin New Zealand, 2009)
- The Hut Builder (Penguin, 2010)
- Going Up is Easy by Lydia Bradey with Laurence Fearnley (Penguin, 2015)
- Reach (Penguin, 2014)
- The Quiet Spectacular (Penguin, 2016)
- To the Mountains: A collection of New Zealand alpine writing selected by Laurence Fearnley and Paul Hersey (Otago University Press, 2018)
- Scented (Penguin, 2019)
- Winter Time (Penguin, 2022)
- At the Grand Glacier Hotel (Penguin, 2024)
