= Rachael Craw =

New Zealand writer and teacher

- Born: Christchurch, New Zealand
- Education: University of Canterbury
- Occupation: Writer
- Writing career
- Language: English
- Genres: fantasy, romance, young adult fiction
- Notable awards: Children's Choice Award in the Young Adult Fiction Category (2016)
- Website: rachaelcraw.com

Rachael Craw is a New Zealand writer of fantasy, romance and YA sci-fi cross-over books. She is an English and Drama teacher and lives in Christchurch with her husband and three children.

== Biography ==
Rachael Craw was born and raised in Christchurch. She completed a degree in Classical Studies and Drama at the University of Canterbury and then trained as a secondary school teacher and taught English for several years at Christchurch Girls' High School and Rangi Ruru Girls' College.

=== Writing career ===
Before beginning the Spark trilogy, she acted, directed and wrote for amateur theatre productions and small independent film ventures.

The idea for her first book, Spark, came from a dream. It took five years to write, under the mentorship of Barbara Else and Chris Else (who later became her agents as TFS Literary Agency]). Rachael then had a one-year deadline to write each of the next two books in the trilogy.

Rachael has appeared at a number of literary festivals, including the Perth International Arts Festival 2015, Auckland Writers Festival Schools Programme 2015, WORD Christchurch Writers & Readers Festival 2016, Somerset Celebration of Literature, Queensland, 2017, State Library Victoria Reading Matters Conference and Regional Tour of Victoria, 2018 and the Storylines Auckland Story Tours 2018. She is active on social media and has the support of the #SparkArm] campaign of teen readers, started by a group of Australian YA book bloggers. Her character Jamie in Spark was nominated for the Teencon Book Boyfriend Battle as part of Sydney's Writers Festival 2015.

Her work has been compared to the worldwide hit series The Hunger Games. She cites some of her own favourite authors as Margaret Atwood, Elizabeth Knox, Kate Atkinson and Maggie Stiefvater.

=== Personal life ===
Rachael describes herself as being fascinated with words from an early age, and remembers being thrilled to receive her first lockable diary. She has kept journals for many years and was naturally drawn to poetry and scriptwriting. Her interest in the spoken word has developed into a passion for dialogue, an aspect of writing that she enjoys the most.

After the 2010 Canterbury earthquake and 2011 Christchurch earthquake, Rachael and her husband and three daughters stayed in their home in a red-zoned street in Christchurch for two years before moving to Nelson.

== Awards and prizes ==
Craw's first novel Spark was named as a Storylines Notable Book for Young Adult Fiction (2015); it was on the State Library Victoria Inky Awards Silver Inky Award shortlist (2015) and the LIANZA Children's Book Awards Longlist (2015) and was a New Zealand Book Awards Children's Choice Finalist for Young Adult Fiction (2015). It has been recently optioned for film by Miss Conception Films.

Stray was the Winner of the Children's Choice Award in the Young Adult Fiction Category for the New Zealand Book Awards for Children & Young Adults (2016).

Craw's 2025 young adult romantic fantasy novel titled The Lost Saint became the winner of the Wheelers Books Award for Young Adult Fiction at the New Zealand Book Awards for Children and Young Adults in August 2026.

== Bibliography ==
- Spark (Walker Books, Australia, 2014)
- Stray (Walker Books, Australia, 2015)
- Shield (Walker Books Australia, 2016)
- The Rift (Walker Books Australia, 2018)
- The Lost Saint (Allen and Unwin Aotearoa New Zealand, 2025)

E-books

- Kill Switch (Walker Books Australia, 2015)
- Black Room (Walker Books Australia, 2015)
- Scar Tissue (Walker Books Australia, 2015)
