= Kelly Ana Morey =

New Zealand novelist and poet (1968–2025)

- Born: 1968; Kaitaia, New Zealand
- Died: 1 September 2025 (aged 57)
- Education: University of Auckland
- Occupations: Novelist; poet
- Writing career
- Language: English
- Genre: Fiction
- Notable works: Bloom; Grace is Gone
- Notable awards: NZSA Hubert Church Best First Book Award

Kelly Ana Morey (1968 – 1 September 2025) was a New Zealand novelist and poet.

== Background ==
Born in Kaitaia in 1968, Morey was of Ngāti Kurī, Te Rarawa, Te Aupōuri, Jewish and Pākehā descent. The family moved to Papua New Guinea in 1971 and Morey grew up there. She referenced Papua New Guinea in her fourth novel, Quinine. At the age of 12, Morey returned to New Zealand to board at New Plymouth Girls’ High School.

In 1997, Morey was accepted into a creative writing class taught by Witi Ihimaera and Albert Wendt. Her story ‘Māori Bread’ was published in the anthology 100 New Zealand Short Short Stories (Tandem).

Morey received a Bachelor of Arts degree in English, a Master of Arts in contemporary Māori art, an MALit, (Master of Arts in Literature) and was pursuing a PhD.

Morey lived in Kaipara. She died on 1 September 2025, at the age of 57.

== Publications ==
=== Fiction ===
Novels by Morey include:

- Bloom (2003, Penguin)
- Grace is Gone (2005, Penguin)
- On an Island, with Consequences Dire (2007, Penguin)
- Quinine (2010, Huia)
- Daylight Second (2016, HarperCollins)

Short stories and poems by Morey have been included in 100 Short, Short Stories, anthologies of Māori writing by Huia Publishers, Whetu Moana: Contemporary Polynesian Poetry in English, and Puna Wai Korer: An Anthology of Maori Poetry in English.

=== Non-fiction ===
Morey served as an oral historian at the Royal New Zealand Navy Museum from 2002. She was the author of Service to the Sea, a non-fiction work about the Royal New Zealand Navy's history.

Morey published How to Read a Book in 2005, a reflection on books that have influenced her life and writing. In 2013, she documented the history of St Cuthbert's College in St Cuthbert’s College 100 Years, She was also contributor to The Spinoff and the equestrian magazine Show Circuit.

== Awards ==
Bloom won the 2004 NZSA Hubert Church Best First Book Award for Fiction at the Montana New Zealand Book Awards. Grace is Gone was a finalist for the Kiriyama Prize for fiction. She was the winner of the 2005 Janet Frame Award for Fiction.

In 2003, Morey received the Todd Young Writers’ Bursary. In 2014 she received the Māori Writer's Residency at the Michael King Writers Centre during which time she developed her novel Daylight Second.
