= Vasanti Unka =

New Zealand writer and illustrator

Vasanti Unka is a New Zealand writer, illustrator and designer. Vasanti was awarded the Arts Foundation (Mallinson Rendel) Laureate Award for Illustration in 2021. A number of her books for children have been shortlisted for awards and she won Best Picture Book and Margaret Mahy Book of the Year Award at the 2014 New Zealand Post Book Awards with The Boring Book. She lives in Auckland, New Zealand.

== Biography ==
Vasanti Unka originally trained as a graphic designer and holds master's degrees in Design and in Creative Writing. She has worked in the book and magazine industry for many years as an art director and art editor and has illustrated picture books, craft books and magazine articles. She lives in Auckland, New Zealand.

In 2015, Vasanti Unka appeared at the Bookaroo Children's Literature Festival in New Delhi, Goa and Pune and in 2017, she also took part in the Bookaroo Festival in Kuching, Sarawak, Malaysia. In 2015, 2016 and 2017, she was part of the New Zealand Book Council Writers in Communities project, working with students of Ōtāhuhu Primary School in south Auckland.

In a 2018 article, she describes her work as "an exploration in visual language" and writes about her cultural heritage, her design influences, and on the need for diversity in children's book publishing to reflect New Zealand's multicultural society. She designed the cover and created some of the portraits for Go Girl: a Storybook of Epic NZ (Puffin, 2018) by Barbara Else.

Vasanti Unka was compiler of the book With A Suitcase Of Saris: From India To Aotearoa: Stories Of Pioneer Indian Women, which relates the stories - told by their daughters and granddaughters - of some of the first Indian women to immigrate to New Zealand.

== Awards and prizes ==
A number of Vasanti Unka's books have been shortlisted for awards or named as Storylines Notable Books.

The Boring Book won Best Picture Book and Margaret Mahy Book of the Year Award at the 2014 New Zealand Post Children's Book Awards. It was described by Barbara Else, Convener of Judges, as a “thoroughly original” book that charmed and enchanted its young readers with its “subversive touches” and “warmth and fun.” It was also chosen as a White Raven Book in 2014 and an IBBY Honour Book in 2016.

- 2021 Arts Foundation Laureate
- 2021 Winner PANZ book design award for children's books for I am the Universe
- 2021 Winner Heritage awards, best children's book for I am the Universe
- 2021 Booklovers Awards for best Children's book for I am the Universe
- 2020 CLNZ Research Grant recipient.
- 2015 IBBY Honours Book Award (International) for Illustration for The Boring Book
- 2014 NZ Children’s Book Awards. Best Picture Book and Overall Winner for The Boring Book
- 2014 White Raven Award (International)for The Boring Book
- 2011 LIANZA Award for Illustration - Best Picture Book for Hill and Hole
- 2011 NZ Book Design Awards - Best Picture Book and Overall winner for Hill and Hole
- 2011 Finalist, NZ Children’s Book Awards for Hill and Hole
- 2007 NZ Book Design Awards - Best Educational book
- 10 times Storylines Notable Book award
- 4 times finalist in NZ children's book awards

== Bibliography ==
- Ice Cream Snow by Janet Slater Bottin (Scholastic, 2001)
- Love to Sing Playtime Songs (Learn to Sing/ Scholastic, 2007)
- Love to Sing Nursery Rhymes (Learn to Sing/ Scholastic, 2007)
- The Bean's Story by Tatiana Aslund (Scholastic, 2007)
- Hill & Hole by Kyle Mewburn (Penguin, 2010)
- Star Boy and Friends: How to Make Cool Stuff from Socks and Gloves (Penguin, 2010)
- Weird Wabbit and Friends: How to Make Cool Stuff from Felt (Penguin, 2010)
- The Boring Book (Penguin, 2013)
- Stripes! No, Spots! (Penguin, 2015)
- With A Suitcase Of Saris: From India To Aotearoa: Stories Of Pioneer Indian Women (compiled by Vasanti Unka) (My Sunroom, 2016)
- Who Stole the Rainbow? (Penguin Random House NZ, 2018)
- I Am the Universe (Penguin Random House NZ, 2020)
- My Elephant is Blue by Melinda Szymanik (Puffin [Penguin NZ], 2021)
- Lucy and the Dark by Melinda Szymanik (Puffin [Penguin NZ], 2023)
- Pukapuka (Beatnik Press, 2025)
