= Michael King Writers Centre =

New Zealand writers' centre

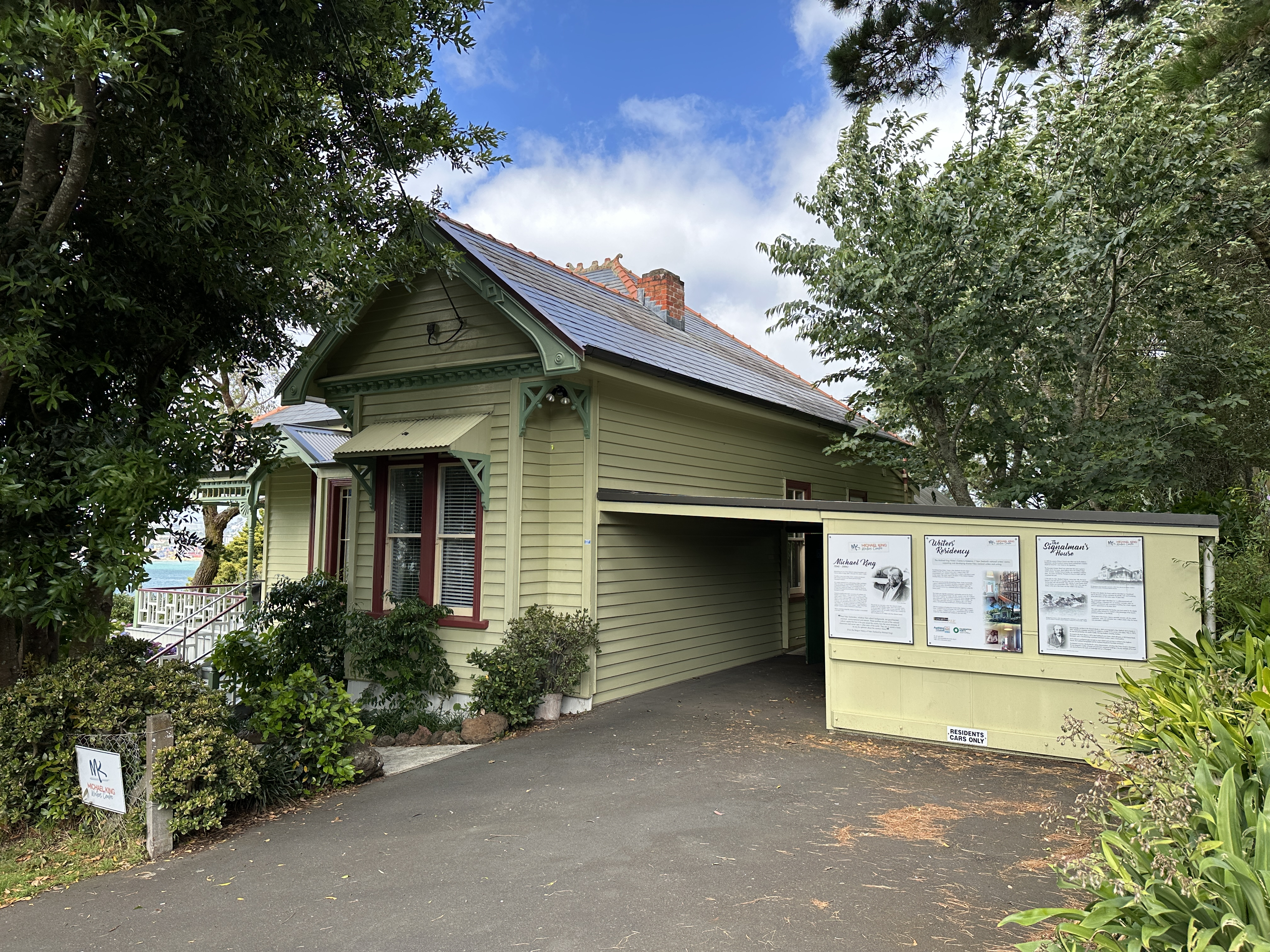
- Street view of centre
- Named after: Michael King
- Established: July 2005; 21 years ago
- Legal status: Charitable trust
- Purpose: Writers' centre
- Location: Takarunga / Mount Victoria, Auckland, New Zealand
- Coordinates: 36°49′39″S 174°47′56″E
- Website: Official website

The Michael King Writers Centre is a writing centre on the slope of Takarunga / Mount Victoria in Devonport, Auckland, New Zealand, which offers residencies to early career and experienced writers. It was established in 2005 in honour of New Zealand historian Michael King.

== About the centre ==
The centre is based at the Signalman's House, a historic house built in 1898, on Takarunga / Mount Victoria in Devonport, Auckland.

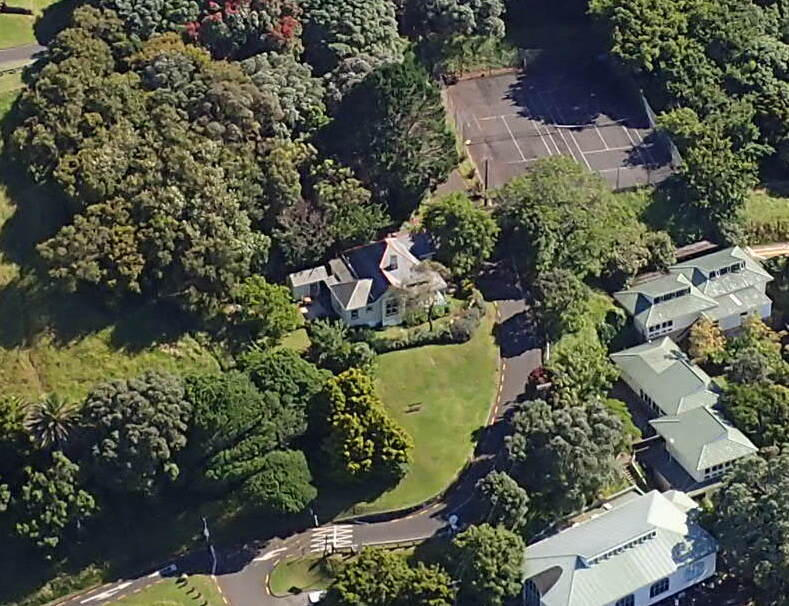
Aerial view of the centre

As of November 2022 the centre had hosted around 140 writers-in-residence. Residencies are of short length to encourage applicants of diverse backgrounds. As of 2024 residencies are offered for between two and three weeks, although in the past they have been offered for as long as six months. The centre also offers short-term accommodation for visiting writers on a paying basis.

== History ==
At the memorial service for historian and writer Michael King in 2004, Gordon McLauchlan suggested that a writers' centre in King's name should be set up. The centre was established through a charitable trust; together with McLauchlan, founding trustees included Christine Cole Catley, Witi Ihimaera and Geoff Chapple.

The centre officially opened in July 2005. The first writer-in-residence was Geoff Chapple.

Between 2007 and 2020, University of Auckland residencies were offered at the centre, supported by Creative New Zealand, which required the writer to spend time at the university's English department. In 2010 the centre began offering Māori writers' residencies, developed with the assistance of Witi Ihimaera. In July 2011 the centre offered a free week's residency for four writers affected by the Christchurch earthquake.

In 2014, in partnership with several organisations including the Shanghai Writers' Association, the centre began running an exchange whereby Chinese writers could undertake a residency at the centre and New Zealand writers could undertake a residency in Shanghai. In 2021 the centre announced a new exchange programme with Varuna, The Writers' House in the Blue Mountains, Sydney.

From 2008 to 2019 the centre offered a programme of workshops for young writers, and since 2012 has published a literary journal of students' work titled Signals. The programme was put on hold in 2020, and the centre has instead run the Signals Awards for writers aged 16 to 21.

== Notable residents ==
Notable recipients of Michael King Writers Centre residencies have included:

- Rachel Barrowman (worked on biography of Maurice Gee, 2010)
- Ann Beaglehole (2009)
- Eleanor Catton (wrote the final draft of The Luminaries, 2012)
- Geoff Chapple (first resident, 2005)
- Chen Danyan (2024)
- Gina Cole (established Pasifika writer-in-residence, 2021)
- Dick Corballis (worked on biography of Bruce Mason, 2008)
- Bill Direen (University of Auckland residency, 2010)
- David Eggleton (wrote Time of the Icebergs poetry collection, 2009)
- Chris Else (2012)
- Tracy Farr (2009, 2018, 2021)
- Karyn Hay (2018)
- Whiti Hereaka (worked on play Rewena, 2012; finished draft of novel Kurangaituku, 2017)
- Roger Horrocks (2015)
- Anna Jackson (2017)
- Jade Kake (emerging Māori writer-in-residence, 2019)
- Anne Kennedy (University of Auckland residency, 2014)
- Sarah Laing (worked on graphic novel about Katherine Mansfield, 2013; also 2008)
- Colleen Maria Lenihan (emerging Māori writer-in-residence, worked on short story collection Kōhine, 2019)
- Kirsten McDougall (2019)
- Fiona Kelly McGregor (through New Zealand-Australia writers' residency exchange, 2023)
- Frankie McMillan (University of Auckland residency, 2017)
- Arthur Meek (wrote play about Mary Martin, 2011)
- Kyle Mewburn (2021)
- Kelly Ana Morey (Māori writer-in-residence, completed novel Daylight Second, 2014)
- Vincent O'Sullivan (worked on biography of Ralph Hotere, 2009)
- Lawrence Patchett (emerging writer-in-residence, 2018)
- Joan Rosier-Jones (2008, 2010)
- Maria Samuela (emerging Pasifika writer-in-residence, 2020)
- Elspeth Sandys (2016)
- Ian Wedde (wrote novel The Catastrophe, 2009)
- Philippa Werry (2019)
- Mere Whaanga (Māori writer-in-residence, 2015)
- Yin Jianling (2017)
