= Gina Cole =

New Zealand writer and lawyer

Gina Cole MNZM
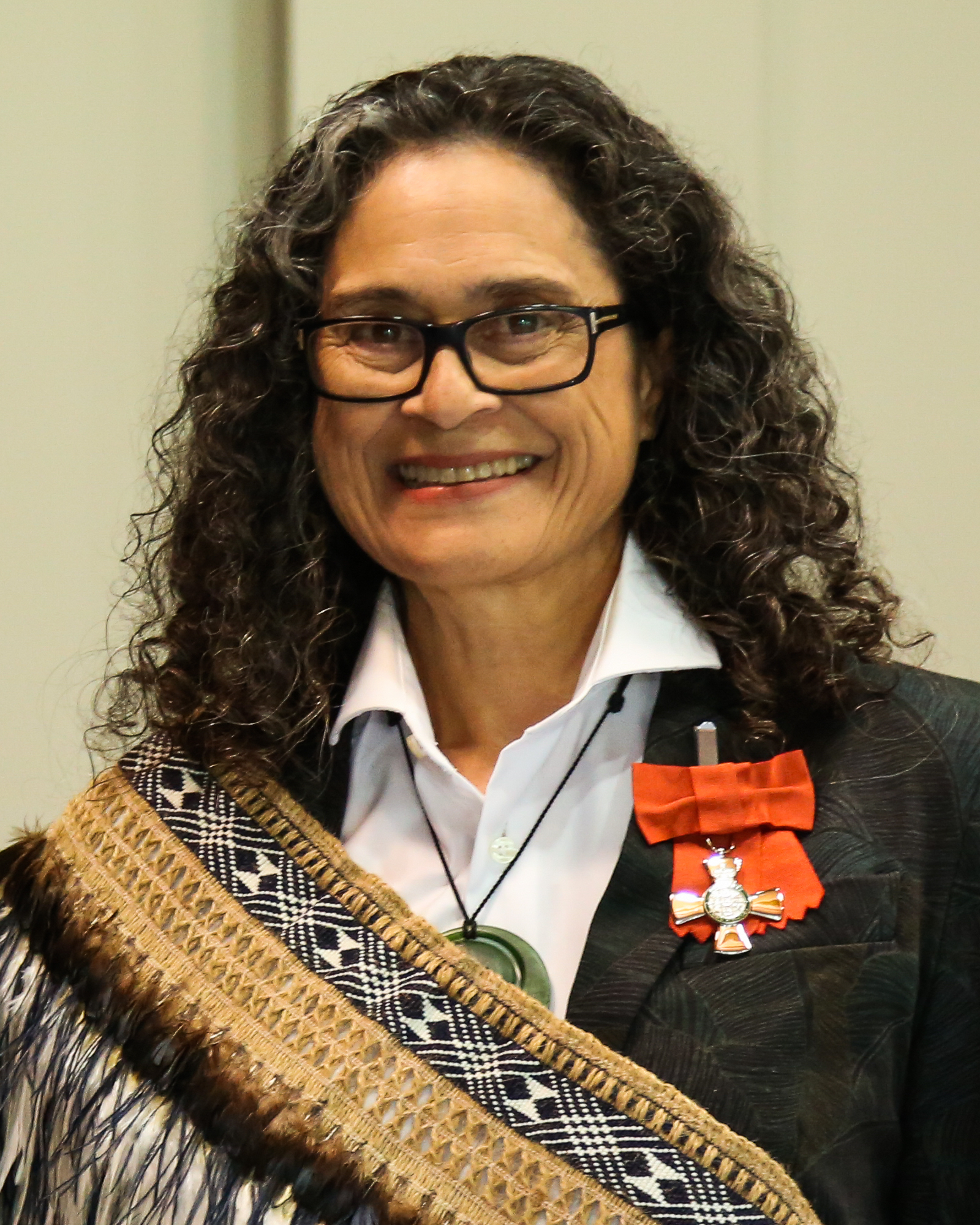
- Cole in 2023
- Born: 1960 (age 65–66)
- Education: University of Auckland (MCW, 2014); Massey University (PhD, 2020)
- Occupations: Writer; lawyer
- Writing career
- Genre: Indigenous science fiction

Gina Annette Cole MNZM (born 1960) is a New Zealand writer and lawyer. Her writing is inspired by her experiences as a queer Fijian woman. Her short story collection Black Ice Matter received the award for best first book of fiction at the 2017 Ockham New Zealand Book Awards. Her first novel Na Viro was published in July 2022.

== Background and education ==
Cole was born in 1960. She is of Fijian, Scottish and Welsh descent. From 1963 to 1966, she and her family lived on Farewell Spit, where her father was the lighthouse keeper. As of 2022, she lives in Auckland. She studied law at the University of Auckland and was admitted to the bar in 1991. She practiced as a barrister until 2018, when she closed her practice to focus on her writing.

In 2013, Cole obtained a Masters in Creative Writing from the University of Auckland, and in 2020 she earned a PhD in Creative Writing from Massey University on the topic of indigenous science fiction. She has said that as "an Indigenous Fijian queer woman writer I feel it is so important that we Indigenous peoples tell our own stories so that we can put forward our perspective and experience". In 2014, she won a writing contest at the Auckland Pride Festival run by Express magazine with her poem "Airport Aubade".

== Writing career ==
In 2017, Cole's short story collection Black Ice Matter received the award for best first book of fiction at the Ockham New Zealand Book Awards. A review by Stuff said that the collection "would be a good book on any reckoning but as a first book it is simply outstanding"; it "shows an assurance of tone, a clarity of style and expression, and an ability to handle different voices, that would be the envy of most more experienced authors". She also had an essay published in the collection New Writing edited by Thom Conroy, and a short story published in Black Marks on the White Page edited by Witi Ihimaera and Tina Makereti.

In 2018, she attended the International Writing Program at the University of Iowa. In 2021, she was a writer-in-residence at the Michael King Writers Centre through a residency for established Pasifika writers, was the first Pasifika curator at the Auckland Writers Festival, and had work published in the anthology Out Here: An Anthology of Takatapui and LGBTQIA+ Writers from Aotearoa New Zealand edited by Chris Tse and Emma Barnes.

In July 2022, Cole's first novel Na Viro was published. It is a science fiction novel set in the distant future and featuring Pacific culture. In the week before 15 July 2022, it was the second-best selling fiction book in New Zealand. A review in the New Zealand Listener described it as an "ambitious book", "at the forefront of a new and particularly interesting genre", but noted that the book was challenging to read in some respects. A review in Landfall concluded that Na Viro is "an important and enjoyable pioneering story that not only brings a uniquely Pasifika voice to the genre but also uses its inter-galactic plot to celebrate the traditions and challenges of the Pacific".

Cole received the inaugural International Residency with Australia, a partnership between the Michael King Writers Centre and Varuna, The Writers' House. The award involved a month's residency at Varuna, to be taken up in October 2022, and an appearance at the Blue Mountains Writers' Festival. In 2022 she had a story published in the First Peoples Shared Stories anthology, and gave the annual Peter Wells lecture at the Same Same But Different literary festival.

In the 2023 New Year Honours, Cole was appointed a Member of the New Zealand Order of Merit, for services to literature. In June 2023, she was announced as the recipient of the Fulbright-Creative New Zealand Pacific Writer's Residency, which provides for three months' residency at the Center for Pacific Islands Studies at the University of Hawaiʻi. Her work was published in The Routledge Handbook of CoFuturisms (Routledge), Pacific Arts Aotearoa (Penguin) and A Kind of Shelter Whakaruru-Taha (Massey University Press).

== Selected works ==
- Black Ice Matter (Huia Publishers, 2016)
- Na Viro (Huia Publishers, 2022)
