= Donovan Bixley =

New Zealand picture book creator

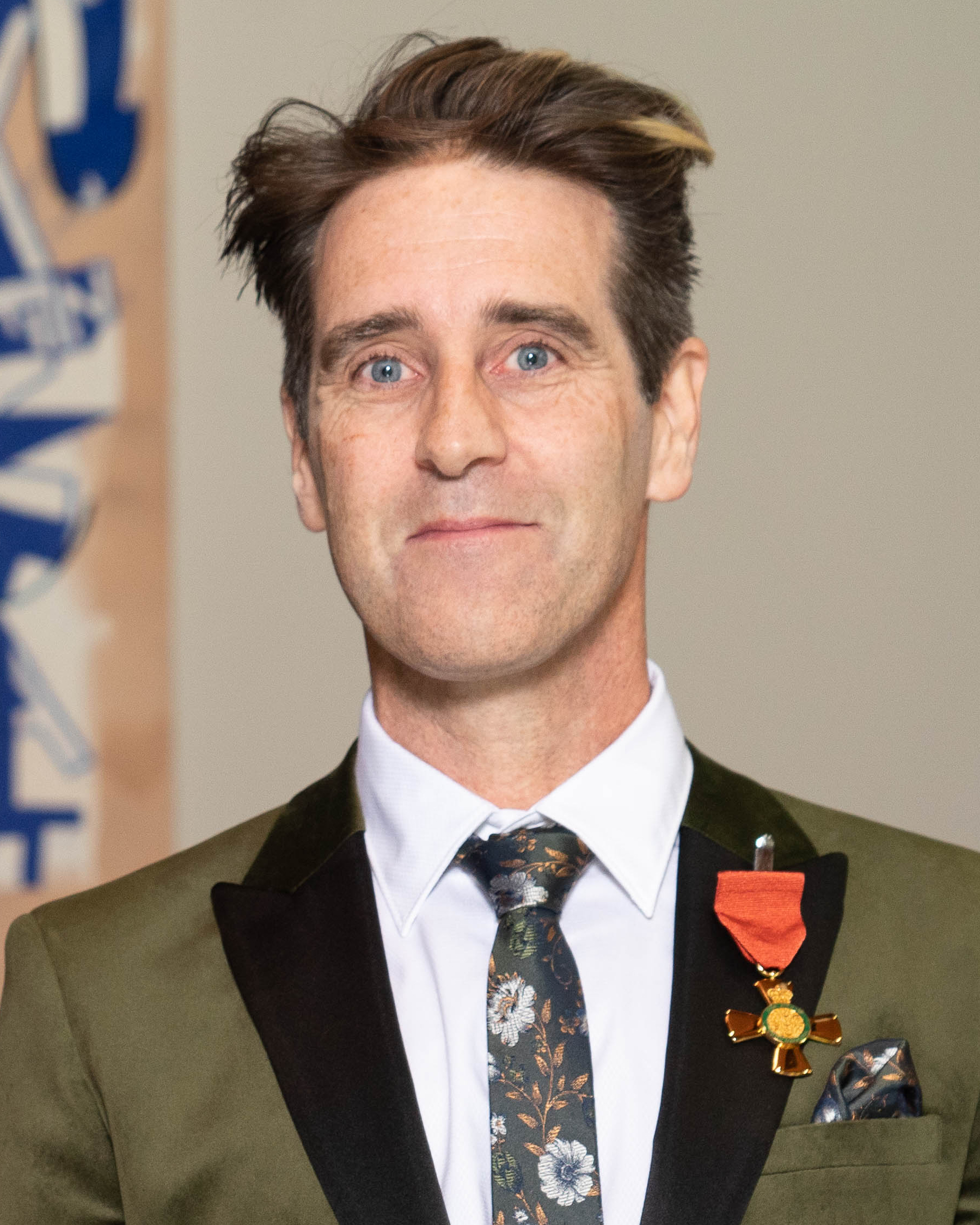
Bixley in 2021

Donovan Paul Bixley ONZM (born 24 August 1971) is an author and illustrator from Taupō, New Zealand. He has created or co-created over 100 books, published in numerous countries and languages. In 2017, Bixley received the Mallinson Rendel Illustrators Award, presented by the Arts Foundation of New Zealand for lifetime achievement as an illustrator.

== Biography ==
Bixley was born in Perth, Western Australia, in 1971, before moving to New Zealand. Early influences Dr Seuss, Gosciny and Uderzo, Murray Ball, and J.R.R. Tolkien sparked an interest in drawing and storytelling. Bixley was head boy at Tauhara College, and went on to complete a Bachelor of Graphic Design at Auckland University of Technology. He worked in advertising and drew regular cartoons for the New Zealand Listener magazine. In 2002 Bixley illustrated Harry Hobnail and the Pungapeople, and went on to create short stories for the School Journal.

Many of Bixley's picture books are bestsellers, notably his kiwiana versions of The Wheels on the Bus and Old MacDonald's Farm. His Dinosaur Rescue series with writer Kyle Mewburn was a bestseller in New Zealand and Norway. Over the course of his career, Bixley has spoken and exhibited at book fairs both nationally and internationally, including events in Taiwan and India.

Bixley's first major work as an author was Monkey Boy, a hybrid comic-novel set in the Napoleonic Wars. His Tales of Aotearoa series of picture books, published simultaneously in English and Māori, retell the legends of Māui for a young audience.

Outside of books, Bixley is a multi-instrumentalist and plays in several Taupō bands.

== Awards ==
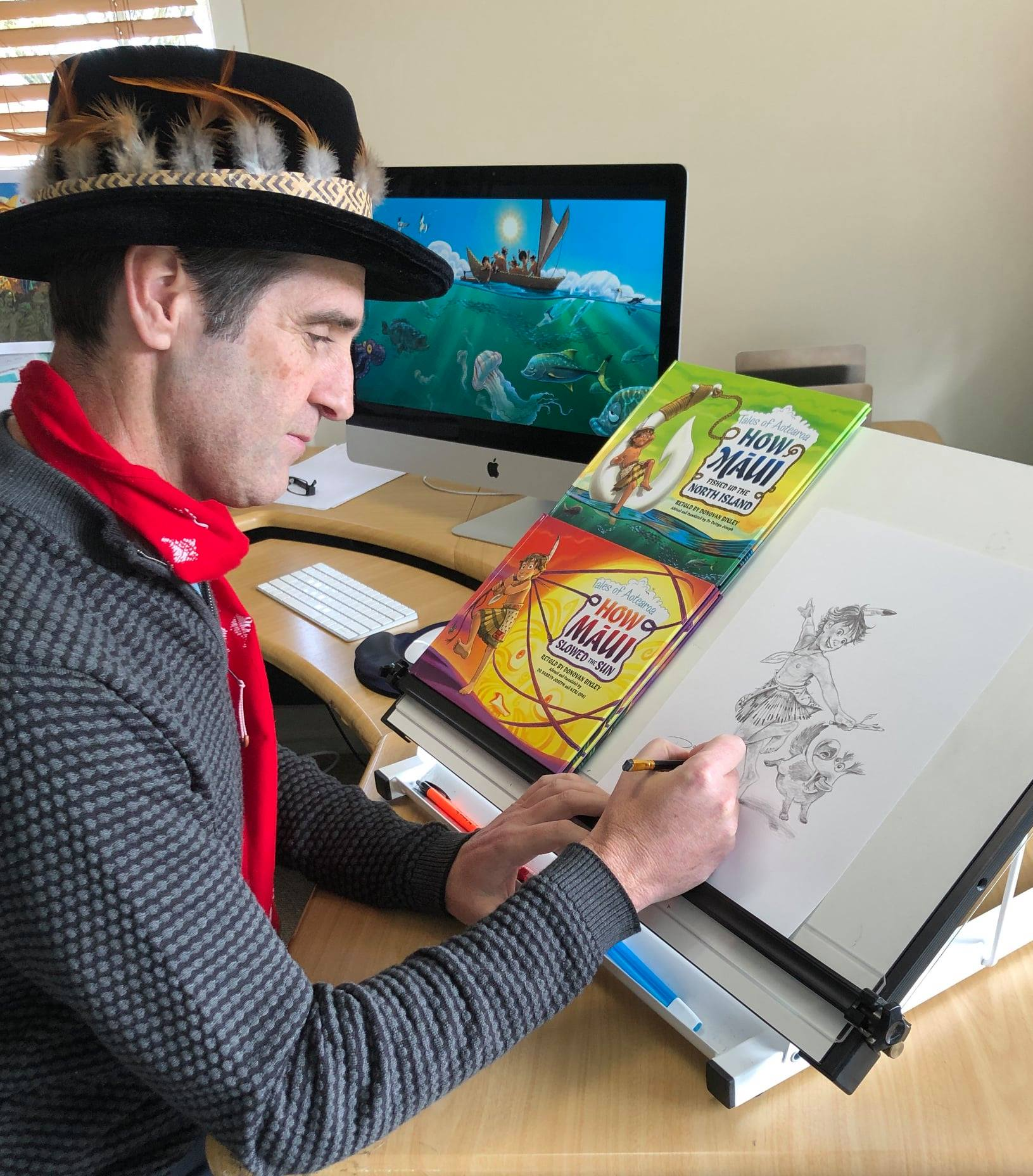
Pictured with his trademark top hat, at work on his Tales of Aotearoa series

Bixley's illustrated biography Faithfully Mozart was a finalist in the 2006 Montana Book Awards. The book was later to be adapted into a concert, which Bixley narrated in a performance alongside the Auckland Philharmonia Orchestra. A re-formatted edition of the book, Mozart: The Man Behind The Music, was published in 2018 as part of a trilogy on historical artists. The second in the series, Much Ado About Shakespeare, was published for the 400th anniversary of Shakespeare's death, and earned Bixley the Russell Clark Illustration Award at the 2016 NZ Book Awards for Children and Young Adults. Cent Magazine UK praised the book for capturing "the exuberance of Shakespeare’s own life and times in a way that is enjoyable and easy to read but hugely informative at the same time." In 2017, Bixley received the Mallinson Rendel Award, and used the prize to fund a research trip to Italy for his biography of Leonardo da Vinci.

Bixley's collaboration with writer Yvonne Morrison The Three Bears Sort Of was voted the winner of two children's choice awards in 2014, in the New Zealand Book Awards for Children and Young Adults and in the Western Australian Young Readers Book Awards. The French language edition of Dogfight, the first book in Bixley's Flying Furballs series, was chosen for the Tatoulu Children's Choice Award in 2018.

In 2015, Bixley became the first artist to have three books shortlisted in the NZ Book Awards for Children and Young Adults, with Monkey Boy winning the Junior Fiction prize. It was also shortlisted in the PANZ Design Awards that year, as well as being selected for the International Youth Library. Fuzzy Doodle, illustrated by Bixley and written by Melinda Syzmanik, was shortlisted for the 2017 Picture Book Award, and was Bixley's second work to be selected by the International Youth Library for the White Raven catalogue, naming it among the 200 best children's books in the world.

In the 2021 New Year Honours, Bixley was appointed an Officer of the New Zealand Order of Merit, for services to children's fiction and as an illustrator.

In 2023 Bixley won the Russell Clark Award for Illustration for A Portrait of Leonardo.

== Selected bibliography ==
- A Portrait of Leonardo (Upstart Press 2022)
- Flying Furballs series (Upstart Press 2016–2020)
- How Māui Fished Up The North Island/Te Hīnga Ake a Māui i te Ika Whenua (Upstart Press 2018)
- How Māui Slowed The Sun/Te Whakatautōnga a Māui i te Rā (Upstart Press 2019)
- Māui and the Secret of Fire/Māui me te Ahi a Mahuika (Upstart Press 2020)
- Much Ado About Shakespeare: A Literary Picture Book (Upstart Press 2016)
- Mozart: The Man Behind the Music (Upstart Press 2018)
- The Wheels on the Bus (Hachette 2010)
- Old MacDonald's Farm (Hachette 2011)
- The Looky Book series (Hachette 2012–2020)
- Monkey Boy (Scholastic 2014)
- Fuzzy Doodle (written by Melinda Syzmanik, Scholastic 2016)
- Dinosaur Rescue series (written by Kyle Mewburn, Scholastic 2011–2013)
- The Three Bears Sort Of (written by Yvonne Morrison, Scholastic 2013)
- Little Red Riding Hood Not Quite (written by Yvonne Morrison, Scholastic 2015)
- The Weather Machine (Scholastic 2013)
- Dashing Dog (written by Margaret Mahy, HarperCollins 2013)
- Harry Hobnail and the Pungapeople (written by Barry Crump, Wheelers 2002)
