= Cathie Dunsford =

New Zealand writer, anthologist and lecturer (born 1953)

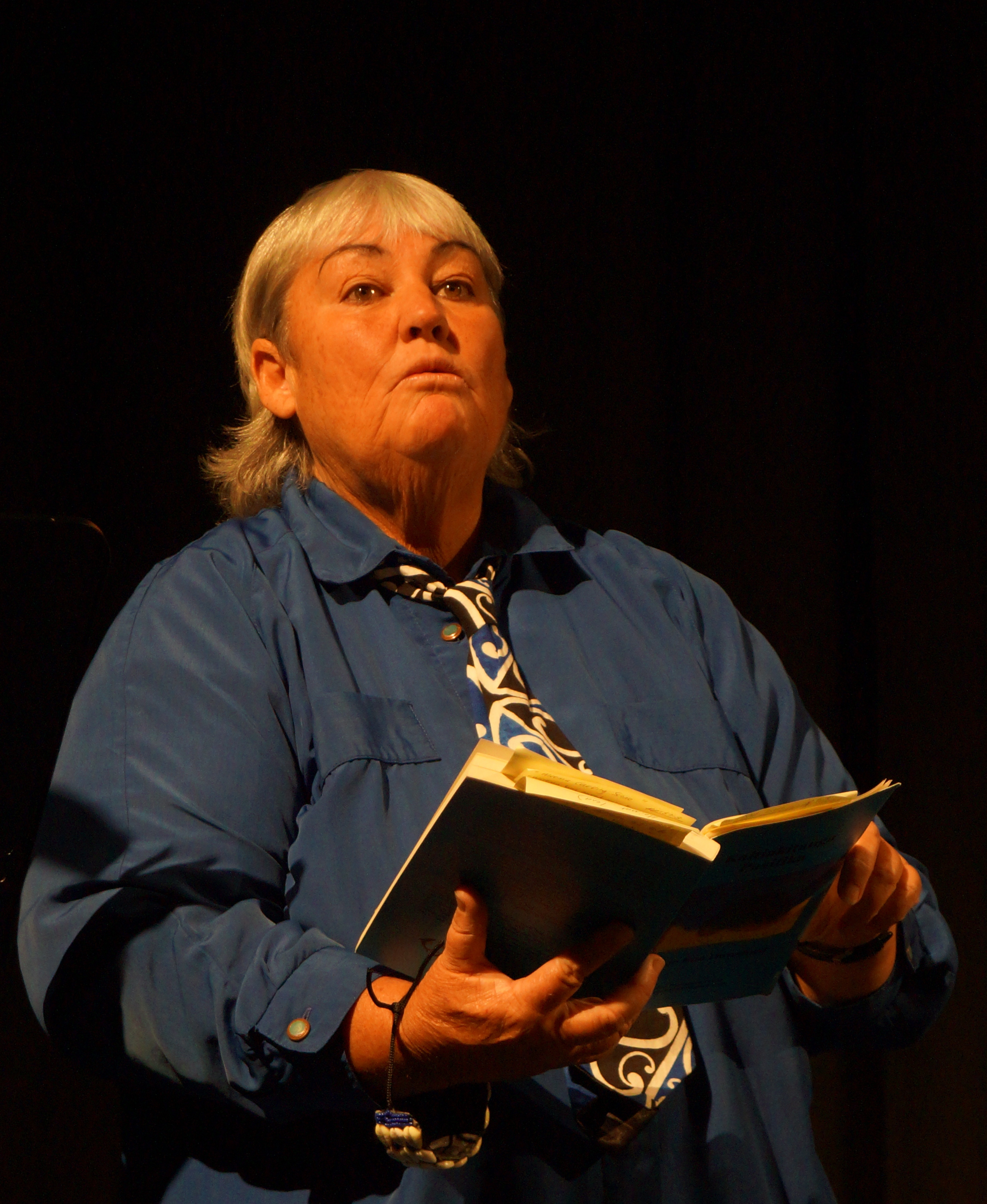
- Dunsford in 2012 at the Frankfurt Book Fair
- Born: 1953 (age 72–73); Auckland, New Zealand
- Education: University of Auckland (PhD)
- Occupations: Novelist; poet; anthologist; lecturer; publishing consultant
- Writing career
- Genres: Feminist; lesbian; Oceanian; Post-colonialist

Academic background
- Thesis: Painting life in extremes: Charles Maturin and the Gothic genre (1983)
- Doctoral advisor: Roger Horrocks

Cathie Koa Dunsford (born 1953) is a New Zealand novelist, poet, anthologist, lecturer and publishing consultant. She has edited several anthologies of feminist, lesbian and Māori/Pasifika writing, including in 1986 the first anthology of new women's writing in New Zealand. She is also known for her novel Cowrie (1994) and later novels in the same series. Her work is influenced by her identity as a lesbian woman with Māori and Hawaiian heritage.

== Early life and career ==
Dunsford was born in Devonport, Auckland, in 1953. She is of Māori descent through the iwi (tribe) of Te Rarawa, as well as Hawaiian and Pākehā (New Zealand European) descent. She attended Westlake Girls High School. She has an MA and a PhD in English literature (obtained in 1983) from the University of Auckland. Her doctoral studies, supervised by Roger Horrocks, were in the area of Gothic fiction. She is also a musician and arranges music festivals.

Dunsford was an English lecturer at the University of Auckland, teaching literature, creative writing and publishing, from 1975. She has described herself as "always completely open about being gay", and said this was difficult in the 1970s because "there were not a lot of books on the subject, and there was not a strong, healthy gay culture". From 1983 to 1986 she taught New Zealand literature, lesbian literature and women's studies at the University of California, Berkeley as a Fulbright scholar.

== Later career ==
Since 1990, Dunsford has been the director of a publishing consultancy firm, Dunsford Publishing Consultants, and has continued to teach and run workshops for creative writing and publishing at various institutions including Whitireia New Zealand. She was the editor and literary agent for Beryl Fletcher's first book, The Word Burners, which won the Commonwealth Writers' Prize for best first book in the South Pacific/East Asia region in 1991. In 1998, writing for the Oxford Companion to New Zealand Literature, Janet Wilson noted "Dunsford's stable of lesbian, heterosexual, established and new writers ... makes her probably the most enterprising and eclectic independent publisher of women's fiction". Writers she had published at that time included Shonagh Koea, Marewa Glover, Keri Hulme, Lauris Edmond and Fiona Kidman.

Dunsford edited the first collection of previously unpublished New Zealand women's writing, New Women's Fiction (1986), published by the New Women's Press. Together with Susan Hawthorne she also edited the first Australian/New Zealand collection of lesbian women's work, The Exploding Frangipani (1990). Many of her collected anthologies are on feminist themes; Subversive Acts (1991) focuses on women's writing as a form of subversion, while Me and Marilyn Monroe (1993) relates to women's bodies. David Eggleton wrote that Subversive Acts shows "contemporary provocateurs rolling unchallenged and perhaps unchallengeable across the local literary landscape". In 1997 Dunsford was International Woman of the Year in Publishing (UK/Europe). She has published a non-fiction work, Getting Published – The Inside Story, which was launched at the 2003 Frankfurt Book Fair.

Her first novel, Cowrie, featured elements of magical realism, environmental issues and indigenous Pasifika cultures; the main character is a lesbian woman who travels to Hawaii and reconnects with her culture. It was published in Australia and New Zealand in 1994, and was described by David Hill as "lyrical to the edge of lushness, but buoyant with belief and commitment". She has written a number of novels since, many of which feature the character Cowrie from her first novel, as well as a volume of poetry, Survivors: Überlebende (1990), which was published in both German and English. Her novels have been translated into German and Turkish. Many of her novels are published by Australian feminist publisher, Spinifex Press.

In 2007, conferences on Dunsford's work were held at the Queen's University at Kingston and the University of Manitoba; a connected book was published in the same year, titled Talkstory: The Art of Listening: Indigenous Poetics and Politics in Cathie Dunsford's Books. She has a strong interest in environmentalism, a common theme in her works, and was the keynote speaker at the 2010 Oceanic Conference on Creativity and Climate Change in Suva, Fiji. In 2012, she appeared at the Berlin International Literature Festival and the Frankfurt Book Fair.

== Selected works ==
=== Novels ===
- Cowrie (1994)
- Kia Kaha (1998)
- The Journey Home (1997)
- Manawa Toa: Heart Warrior (2000)
- Song of the Selkies (2001)
- Ao Toa: Earth Warriors (2004)
- Pele's Tsunami (2010)
- Kaitiakitanga Pasifika (2012)
- Occupy Omaha (2014)

=== Non-fiction ===
- Getting Published – The Inside Story (2003)

=== Anthologies ===
- New Women's Fiction (1986)
- The Exploding Frangipani: lesbian writing from Australia and New Zealand (1990), co-edited with Susan Hawthorne
- Subversive Acts (1991)
- Me and Marilyn Monroe (1993)
- Car Maintenance, Explosives and Love (1998), co-edited with Susan Hawthorne and Susan Sayer
- Other Lesbian Writing (1997)
- Vaka Moana: Pacific Writing (2007)
