= Elspeth Sandys =

New Zealand author

Elspeth Sandys ONZM
- Born: 1940 (age 85–86); Timaru, New Zealand
- Education: University of Auckland; Trinity College London
- Occupation: Writer
- Website: elspethsandys.co.nz

Elspeth Somerville Sandys ONZM (born 1940) is a New Zealand author and script writer.

== Background ==
Born in Timaru in 1940, she grew up in Dunedin. She was adopted by the Alley family and was exposed to literature from a young age by Rewi Alley. She uses the surname Sandys as a pseudonym.

Sandys received an MA (First Class Honours) in English from the University of Auckland, an Associate Diploma (FTCL) in Speech & Drama and a Fellowship Diploma (LTCL) in Music, both from Trinity College London.

== Works ==
Sandys's fiction often focuses on personal, social, and political relationships. While some of her novels are historical fiction their motivating themes remain contemporary. In addition to her published works, Sandys has taught creative writing and worked as an editor at Oxford University Press.

=== Novels ===
- Obsession (Upstart Press, 2017)
- A Passing Guest (Flamino, 2002)
- Enemy Territory (Hodder Moa Beckett, 1997)
- Riding to Jerusalem (in New Zealand: Hodder Moa-Beckett, 1997, and in the UK: Hodder & Stoughton, 1997 )
- River Lines (in New Zealand: Hodder Moa-Beckett, 1995, and in the UK: Hodder & Stoughton, 1995)
- Finding Out (Vintage, 1991), also published in French as Découvertes (Actes Sud, 1997)
- Love and War (William Collins, 1982)
- The Broken Tree (Hutchinson, 1981), published in the United States under the title The Burning Dawn (Dell, 1981)
- Catch a Falling Star (Blond and Briggs, 1978)

=== Short story collections ===
- Standing in Line (published in English and Spanish, in Mexico by the Secretariat of Culture, 2005)
- Best Friends (David Ling, 1993)

=== Poetry ===
Sandys has had poems and short fiction published in several journals including in: Landfall (multiple pieces including short story 'The Postman', 2012); PEN (UK); New Zealand Listener; and New Zealand Books Pukapuka Aotearoa.

=== Non-fiction ===
- What Lies Beneath: a memoir (Otago University Press, 2014)
- Casting Off: a memoir (Otago University Press, 2017)
- A Communist in the Family: Searching for Rewi Alley (Otago University Press, 2019)

With John Man, Sandys has ghostwritten several non-fiction works including The Survival of Jan Little (Penguin Books, 1986).

Sandys has written for both the BBC and Radio New Zealand including original plays and adaptations, and scripts for film and television, with performances taking place in the United Kingdom and New Zealand.

== Honours and awards ==
Her novel, River Lines, was longlisted for the 1996 Orange Prize and her unpublished collection of short stories, Standing in Line, won the Elena Garro Prize in 2003.

In 2005, her play Vagabonds (previously titled Masquerade) was selected for the International Playwriting Festival in London. It was also shortlisted in 2006 in the Columbus State Theatre Playwriting Competition.

In the 2006 New Year Honours, Sandys was appointed an Officer of the New Zealand Order of Merit, for services to literature.

=== Residencies and fellowships ===
In 1992 Sandys was awarded the Grimshaw Sargeson Fellowship with Gaelyn Gordon. She was awarded the Robert Burns Fellowship, in 1995, a literary residency at the University of Otago in Dunedin, New Zealand. In 2016 she received a residency at the Michael King Writers Centre.
