= Annie Goldson =

New Zealand journalism and film academic specialising in documentaries

Annie Goldson ONZM
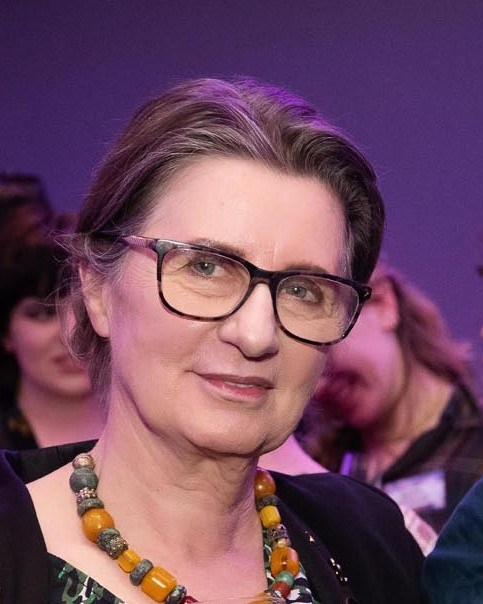
- Goldson in 2024
- Known for: Documentary film

Academic background
- Education: University of Auckland
- Thesis: A claim to truth : documentary, politics, production (2004)
- Doctoral advisor: Roger Horrocks; Laurence Simmons

Anne Veronica Goldson ONZM is a New Zealand journalism and film academic specialising in documentaries. Her films include Punitive Damage, Georgie Girl, Brother Number One and Kim Dotcom: Caught in the Web.

== Career ==
Goldson has a BSc from Otago University, a Diploma in Journalism from Canterbury University, a Master of Arts from New York University and a PhD from the University of Auckland. The title of her doctoral thesis was A claim to truth: documentary, politics, production. She is currently a professor of Media and Communication at the University of Auckland.

== Honours and awards ==
Goldson was made an Officer of the New Zealand Order of Merit in 2007 for services to film and was elected a Fellow of the Royal Society of New Zealand in 2007. She was awarded the Humanities Aronui Medal by Royal Society Te Apārangi in 2021. In 2023, she received an Arts Foundation of New Zealand Laureate Award.

== Selected works ==
- Goldson, A. (12/3/2017). Kim Dotcom: Caught in the Web, South by South West Festival, Austin, Texas (premiere).
- Goldson, A. (2015). Journalism plus?: The resurgence of creative documentary. Pacific Journalism Review, 21 (2), 86–98.
- King, B., Goldson, A. V., & Robie, D. (Eds.) (2015). Documentary practice in the Asia-Pacific. Auckland: Pacific Media Centre. Pages: 217.
- Goldson, Annie (2 January 2014). "Testimony and translation: tracing the past in Brother Number One". Studies in Documentary Film. 8 (1): 2–20. doi:10.1080/17503280.2014.900709. ISSN 1750-3280.
