= Tracy Farr =

Australian-New Zealand writer

- Born: 1962 (age 63–64); Melbourne, Australia
- Education: University of Western Australia (BSc/BA)
- Occupations: Novelist; short story writer; research scientist
- Website: Official website

Tracy Farr (born 1962) is an Australian and New Zealand writer. Previously a research scientist, Farr has published three novels and several short stories. In 2014 she won the Sunday Star-Times Short Story Award.

== Early life and scientific career ==
Farr was born in Melbourne, but grew up in Perth where she attended school and university. She holds a bachelor's degree in science with honours in microbiology and a bachelor's degree in arts (English literature) from the University of Western Australia.

Farr worked in Australia as a phycologist (scientist studying algae) after graduating and in Canada between 1991 and 1996. In 1996 she moved to New Zealand, where she continued to work as a scientist, including at NIWA and Te Papa, and at the Royal Society of New Zealand from 2011 to 2015. Her particular area of focus was coralline algae.

== Writing career ==
Farr's short stories have been anthologised in The Best New Zealand Fiction volume 1 (2004) and volume 3 (2006). She has also had short stories published in Turbine, Sport, Westerly and The New Zealand Listener, as well as broadcast on RNZ National. Her short story "The Blind Astronomer" was the runner-up for the Katherine Mansfield Memorial Award in 2001, and "Once Had Me" was the winner of the Sunday Star-Times Short Story Award in 2014. The judge of the latter commented that "each time I read it I was struck again by the confidence of the narrative voice, deceptively casual and colloquial, yet displaying an unfaltering authorial control".

Farr has held a number of writer's residencies; she was the Emerging Writer-in-Residence at the Katharine Susannah Pritchard Writers Centre in 2008, a visiting writer at the Michael King Writers Centre in 2009, the 2014 R.A.K. Mason Writer's Fellow, the 2015 Varuna Second Book Residential Fellow at Varuna, The Writers' House, and the inaugural writer-in-residence at the Mildura Writers' Festival.

Farr's debut novel, The Life and Loves of Lena Gaunt, was published by Fremantle Press in Australia in 2014, and by Aardvark Bureau in the United States, Europe and UK in 2016. It was shortlisted for the Barbara Jefferis Award and the Western Australian Premier's Book Award, and longlisted for the Miles Franklin Literary Award. It is a fictional biography of Lena Gaunt, a theremin player. It was reviewed by The New York Times, which said that Gaunt's choice of musical instrument was "immediately intriguing".

Her second novel, The Hope Fault, was published in 2017 by Fremantle Press, by Gallic Books in 2018 in the US and UK, and by Parallelo45 Edizioni in 2018 in Italy under the title Dopo la pioggia. A review in The Sydney Morning Herald described it as about "the way we live our daily emotional lives and accommodate whatever happens to us, and [Farr] cleverly uses the solid ground of a particular house as a base for these explorations". It was selected as one of the 100 best books of 2017 by The New Zealand Listener, which described it as "quietly brilliant". In 2019 it was adapted for the stage by writer and director Andrew Hale and performed at the Western Australian Academy of Performing Arts.

Farr's third novel, Wonderland, won the 2024 NZSA Laura Solomon Cuba Press Prize. It was published by The Cuba Press in 2025. Wonderland is set on Te Motu Kairangi Miramar Peninsula in 1912, and features a fictional visit to New Zealand by scientist Marie Curie. The Laura Solomon Cuba Press Prize judges praised the novel for its "sheer originality and the lyricism of its writing".

== Selected works ==
- The Life and Loves of Lena Gaunt (Fremantle Press, 2014)
- The Hope Fault (Fremantle Press, 2017)
- Wonderland (The Cuba Press, 2025)
