= Hemi Pomara =

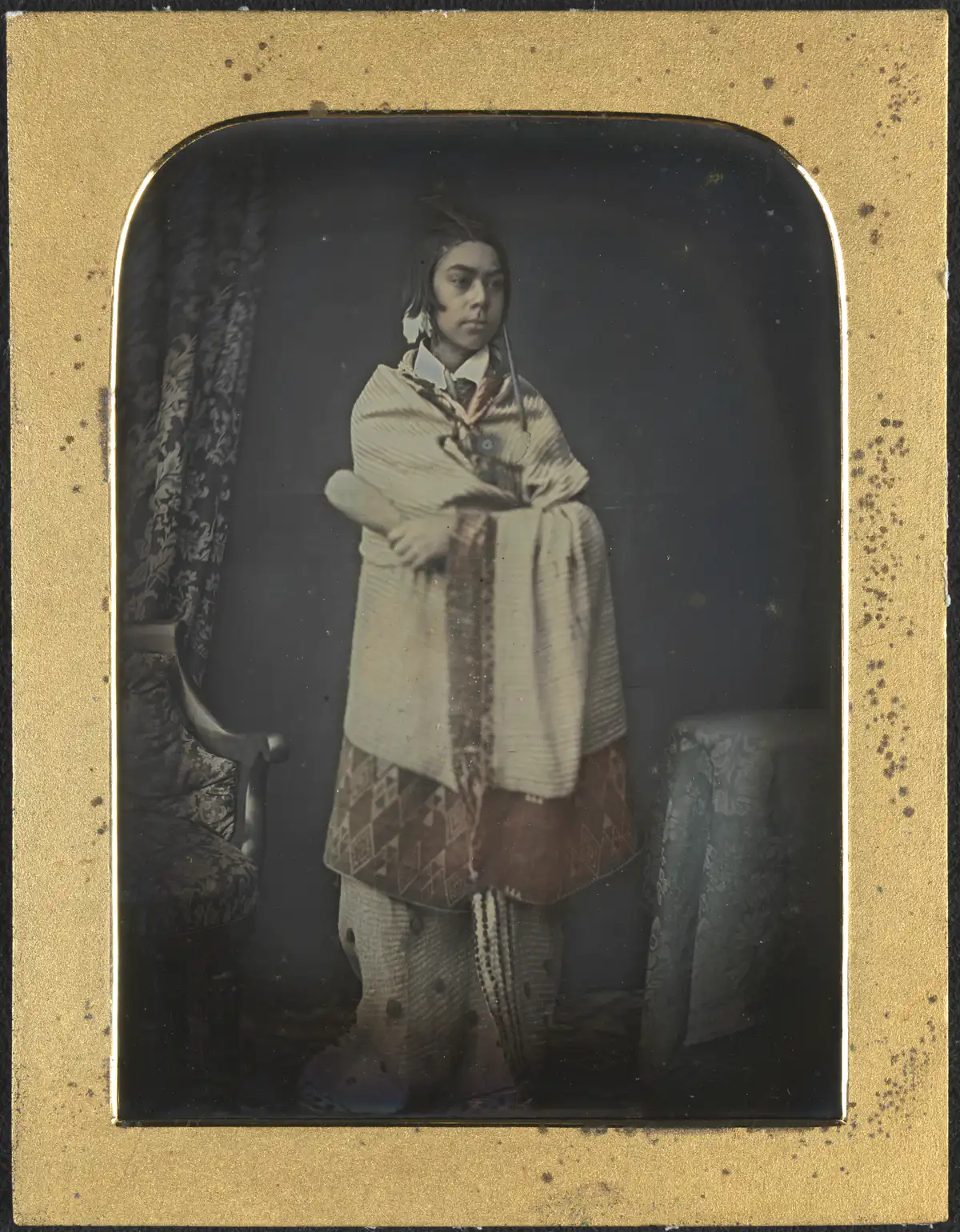
- 1846 daguerreotype of Hemi Pomara by Antoine Claudet
- Born: circa 1830
- Died: unknown

Hēmi Pōmare (born c. 1831; sometimes spelled Pomara) was a man of Māori chiefly descent. He was taken to Sydney in the early 1840s, then London in 1845–46, was shipwrecked in Barbados while on a voyage, and then returned to New Zealand in 1847, all while in his youth. A daguerreotype of Pōmare is the oldest known photograph of any Māori person. A novel and a planned film are based on his life.

== Early life ==
Hēmi Pōmare was born in around 1830 or 1831. It was said that he was a grandson of Pōmare Ngātata, a chief of Ngāti Mutunga, an iwi (tribe) who were living around Wellington Harbour at the time. On one occasion, a newspaper report said he was the son of Pōmare Ngātata. One source said that he was "a half-caste", his mother being Māori. Pōmare Ngātata, who was about 30 in 1834, according to information collected by Percy Smith, migrated with Ngāti Mutunga to the Chatham Islands in 1835, where he died in 1851.

Hēmi Pōmare was said to have been orphaned when his family were all killed by a hostile tribe, with his father being eaten by the killers.

== Sydney ==
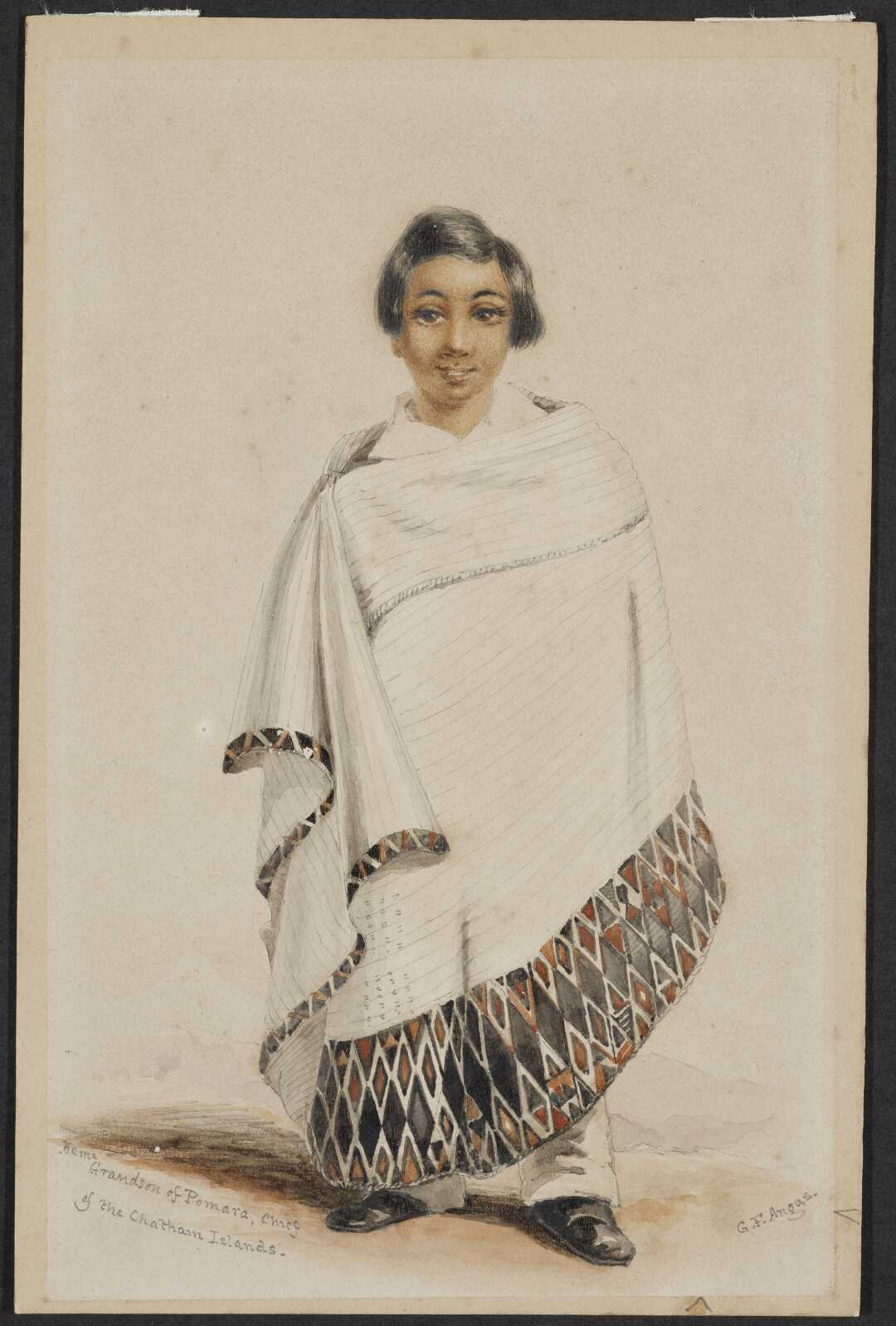
Portrait by George French Angas, painted probably in 1844 or 1845, now in the National Library of New Zealand

Pōmare was sent to Sydney, the capital of the then Colony of New South Wales, by David Scott in the early 1840s, according to two independent accounts, one by the artist George French Angas and the other by an unnamed newspaper writer who was trenchantly critical of Angas. In March 1846 Angas said that Pōmare had been sent from New Zealand to Sydney three or four years earlier "by a friend of mine, named Scott". There he lived with the family of T. Brennand and attended school. In December 1846 the unnamed newspaper writer said that Pōmare was "a half-caste", his mother being Māori, and that he was "the adopted son of Mr. David Scott, by whom he was maintained, and at whose expense he was educated at Sydney."

After Angas travelled around New Zealand for three months in 1844, doing sketches and watercolours of Māori and their material culture and customs, and collecting cultural objects, he went to Sydney, where he became Pōmare's guardian. Angas travelled around New South Wales and the neighbouring Province of South Australia, sketching Indigenous Australians to complete his portfolio of "Illustrations of the Natives and Scenery of Australia and New Zealand together with 300 portraits from life of the principal Chiefs, with their Families". It was probably during this period in Australia that he painted a watercolour portrait of Pōmare to include in the collection. The painting is inscribed, "Hemi, grandson of Pomara, Chief of the Chatham Islands". Pōmare is depicted wearing a korowai (a traditional Māori cloak), befitting his high status. This portrait is now in the collection of the National Library of New Zealand.

== England and the Caribbean ==
Departing on the Royal Tar on 10 September 1845, Angas took Pōmare to England, via Rio de Janeiro. They arrived at Gravesend on 23 February 1846. Angas documented the voyage in his 1847 book Savage Life and Scenes in Australia and New Zealand, in which Pōmare is mentioned but once, and briefly, as "My young New Zealander, Pomara". (Note: Angas, Savage Life and Scenes..., Volume 2, 1847, page 247: The number of Cape pigeons that follow in the wake of the vessel is astonishing. They appear very hungry, and are perpetually in danger of being sucked down by the little whirlpools that eddy in the vessel's wake, whilst diving and scuffling for the morsels of food thrown overboard. My young New Zealander, Pomara, caught a great many of them with a hook and line, and sent them away again with canvass collars round their necks.)

Angas exhibited his Australia and New Zealand pictures at the British and Foreign Institute in London on 17 March 1846, accompanied by Pōmare, who wore Māori clothing, and impressed attendees with his intelligence. Newspaper reports of the event said that he was "son of the chief Pomara, who, with the whole of his family [...] were killed by a hostile party", and that Angas had taken him to Sydney. Angas wrote to editors of the newspapers with one point of correction, saying that he had not been the one who took Pōmare to Sydney.

On 3 April 1846 Pōmare was introduced to Queen Victoria and Prince Albert during a private viewing of drawings. On 4 April, he accompanied Angas to a Royal Society soirée, wearing Māori dress and carrying a spear, and was introduced to an audience that included Charles Dickens, Charles Darwin, and Antoine Claudet. The last was a pioneering French daguerreotypist, working in London. Pōmare sat for Claudet, wearing the same cloak that he wore for the Angas portrait.

Angas then exhibited his pictures at the Egyptian Hall for three months starting in April, with Pōmare being present in his Māori costume. Reviewers were impressed with Pōmare's intelligence. The Times described him as "a young lad, about 14 years of age, grandson of the celebrated New Zealand Chief Pomara, and son of a celebrated chief who was slain in battle and devoured by the warriors of a hostile tribe. This youth is exceeedingly intelligent, and exhibits strong proofs of intellectual capacity." A woodcut depicting Pōmare was published in The Illustrated London News, 18 April 1846 edition, where he was named as "James Pomara", "a grandson of Pomara, a chief of the Chatham Islands", who "has been educated in New South Wales, speaks English fluently, and is a very intelligent person." (Note: The Illustrated London News, 18 April 1846, page 253: But the living attraction of the Exhibition is a New Zealand youth, about fourteen years of age, and named James Pomara; he is a grandson of Pomara, a chief of the Chatham Islands; has been educated in New South Wales, speaks English fluently, and is a very intelligent person. He was present at the last soirée given by the Marquis of Northampton, where he excited considerable Interest among the savans.)

Later in 1846, Pōmare wished to go to sea and embarked for a trip to Barbados and Honduras on the Caleb Angas, which belonged to Angas's father George Fife Angas and was used for trade with those places. The ship departed the Thames on 17 July and arrived at Barbados on 1 September. A gale, the strongest to strike Barbados for some years, arose on 12 September and the wind and waves drove ashore some of the ships that were in the roadstead. The Caleb Angas went onto a reef and was totally destroyed. All those aboard were rescued; Pōmare survived with just the clothes he was wearing. He visited Grenada and Saint Vincent and then returned to London on the Eliza. During that voyage, he was assaulted by the ship's first mate, who was tried and fined £5 for it in a Thames court on 28 November 1846.

== Return to New Zealand ==
By November 1846 it had been decided that Pōmare would return to New Zealand with Edward John Eyre, who had been appointed Lieutenant-Governor of the New Munster Province of New Zealand. They sailed on the Glentanner on 1 February 1847; others on board included Major General George Dean Pitt and Piri Kawau of Te Āti Awa. The Glentanner arrived in Sydney on 18 June. There they boarded the Pestonjee Bomanjee, which arrived in Auckland on 10 July.

Little or nothing is known of Pōmare after his arrival in Auckland.

== Legacy ==
The title character of The Imaginary Lives of James Pōneke, a 2018 novel by Tina Makereti, is based on Pōmare. As of July 2020, a film version, produced by Taika Waititi, is planned.

In 2020 Claudet's hand-tinted daguerreotype was identified in the National Library of Australia, having been purchased for the library by Eric Keast Burke in 1960. It is the oldest known photograph of a Māori person.
