= Westlake Girls High School =

- Māori: Te Kura Tuarua o Ngā Taitamawāhine o Ururoto

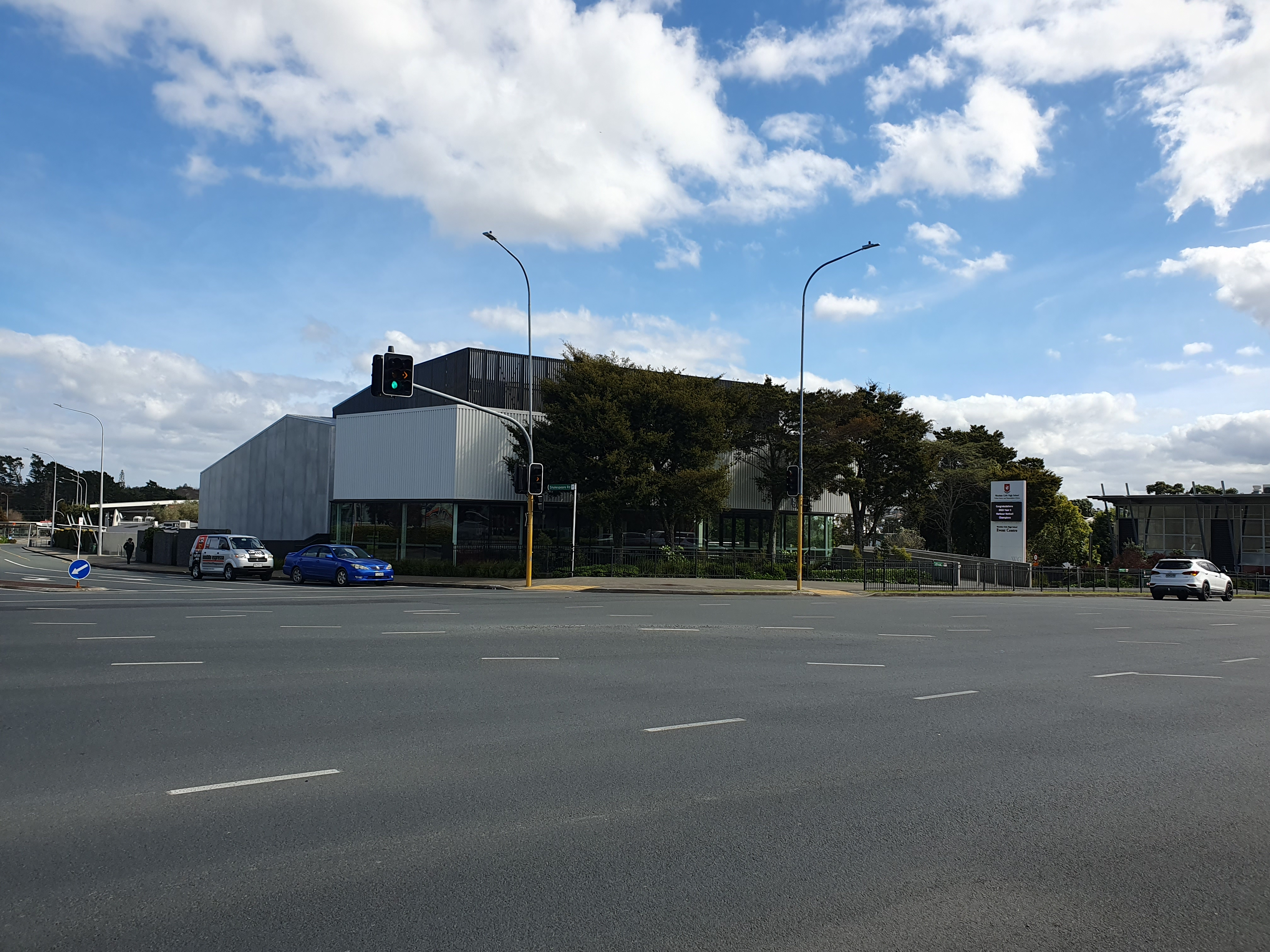

Location
- Auckland, New Zealand; 36.7825°S 174.7508°E

Information
- Type: Public school
- Motto: Virtute Experiamur (Let Courage Be Thy Test)
- Established: 1957 (co-ed), 1962 (single-sex)
- Sister school: Westlake Boys High School
- Ministry of Education Institution no.: 38
- Principal: Jane Stanley
- Years offered: 9–13
- Gender: Female
- Enrolment: 2,289 (July 2026)
- Houses: 5
- Colours: Red & Green
- Socio-economic decile: 9Q
- Website: www.westlakegirls.school.nz

Westlake Girls High School (Māori: Te Kura Tuarua o Ngā Taitamawāhine o Ururoto) is a state girls secondary school, located to the west of Lake Pupuke in Takapuna, Auckland, New Zealand. The school was established in 1957 as a coeducational school, changing to girls only in 1962 when Westlake Boys High School opened. Westlake Girls has a roll of approximately 2,289 students from Years 9 to 13 (ages 12 to 18), making one of the largest single-sex schools in New Zealand.

The school is divided into five house groups; based on the five Olympic Rings: Akoranga (black), Hauraki (gold), Onewa (red), Pupuke (blue) and Wairau (green).

== History ==
The school has its origin in 1957, when it opened as a co-ed institution. In 1962 Westlake Girls and Westlake Boys High School emerged as separate schools, though they maintain relations.

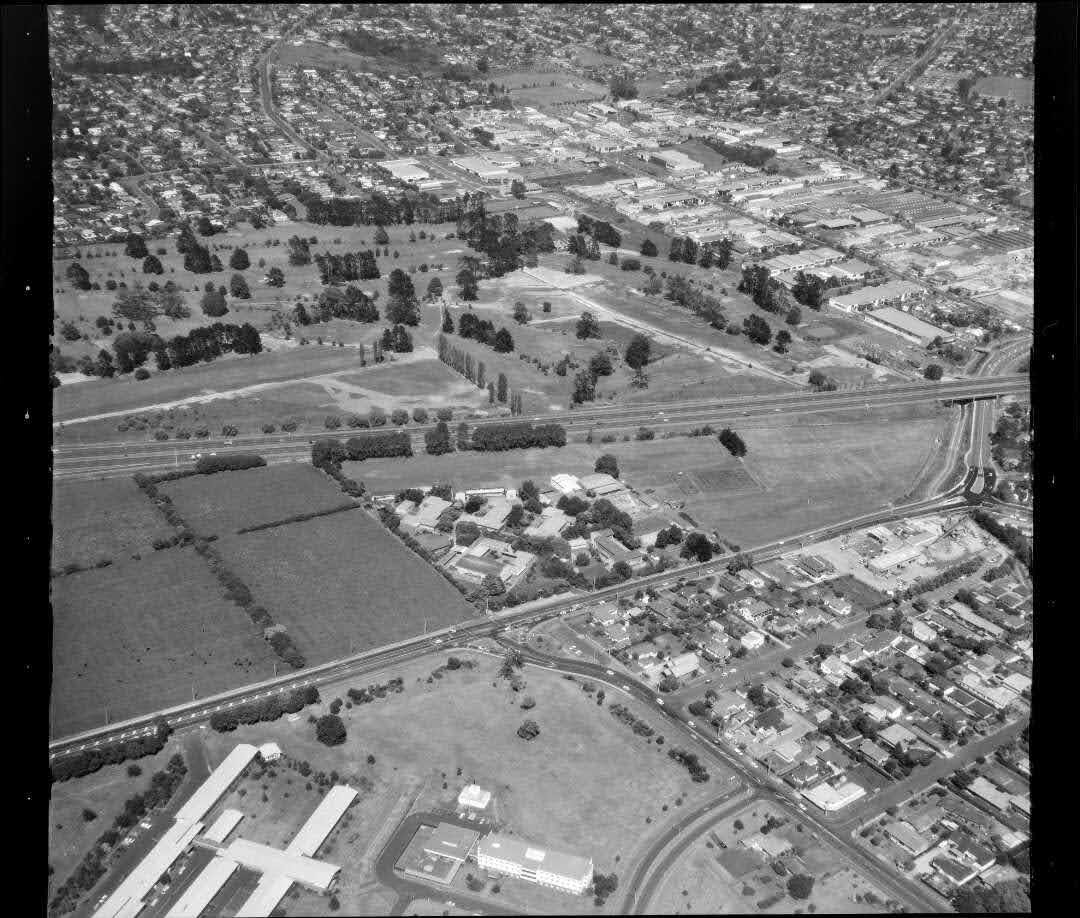
Westlake Girls High School (1988)

After three decades of service, principal Alison Gernhoefer retired at the end of 2011, succeeded by Roz Mexted. In the 1994 Queen's Birthday Honours, Gernhoefer was appointed a Companion of the Queen's Service Order for public services. The Gernhoefer Administration building is named in her honour. She died on 12 April 2022.

Mexted was principal from November 2011 to November 2016. Changes during her tenure were the introduction of a new Junior and Senior uniform, and the development of the undercover netball and tennis courts visible from the motorway. The house system was also updated in an effort to increase school unity and spirit.

Jane Stanley was appointed to succeed Mexted and took up the position of principal at the beginning of the second term in May 2017. She is married to former Olympic rower Mike Stanley.

== Westlake Girls and Boys ==
Physically merely a few hundred metres apart, Westlake Girls and Westlake Boys engage in an annual theatrical production together, several joint musical ensembles (including a joint choir, two orchestras, a concert band and a jazz band), and some social dances, among other things. The two schools share a motto – Virtute Experiamur (Let Courage Be Thy Test).

== Enrolment ==
As of July 2026, Westlake Girls High School has roll of 2,289 students, of which 234 (10.2%) identify as Māori.

As of 2026, the school has an Equity Index of 403, placing it amongst schools whose students have few socioeconomic barriers to achievement (roughly equivalent to deciles 8 and 9 under the former socio-economic decile system).

== Principals ==
	Name	Term	Notes
1	Sylvia Mollard	1962–1969	
2	Helen Ryburn	1969–1981	
3	Alison Gernhoefer	1981–2011	
4	Roz Mexted	2011–2016	
5	Jane Stanley	2017–present	

== Notable alumnae ==
- Rosie Cheng – tennis player
- Erin Naylor – association footballer
- Jo Aleh – sailor
- Alethea Boon – athlete, gymnast, weightlifter
- Naisi Chen - politician
- Cathie Dunsford – novelist, poet, anthologist, lecturer and publishing consultant
- Joanne Gair – artist, bodypainter
- Nikki Jenkins – gymnast
- Jenny Kirk – politician
- Kayla McAlister – rugby sevens player
- Judy Millar – artist
- Carol Oyler – cricketer
- Anona Pak – badminton player
- Katie Perkins – cricketer
- Karen Plummer – cricketer
- Allison Roe – athlete
- Samantha Scott – theatre director
- Rebecca Sowden – association footballer
- Kate Sylvester – fashion designer
- Rosita Vai – singer
- Lisa Wallbutton – basketball player
- Diana Wichtel – writer and critic
- Chelsea Winter – celebrity chef
