= Shirley Horrocks =

New Zealand documentary filmmaker

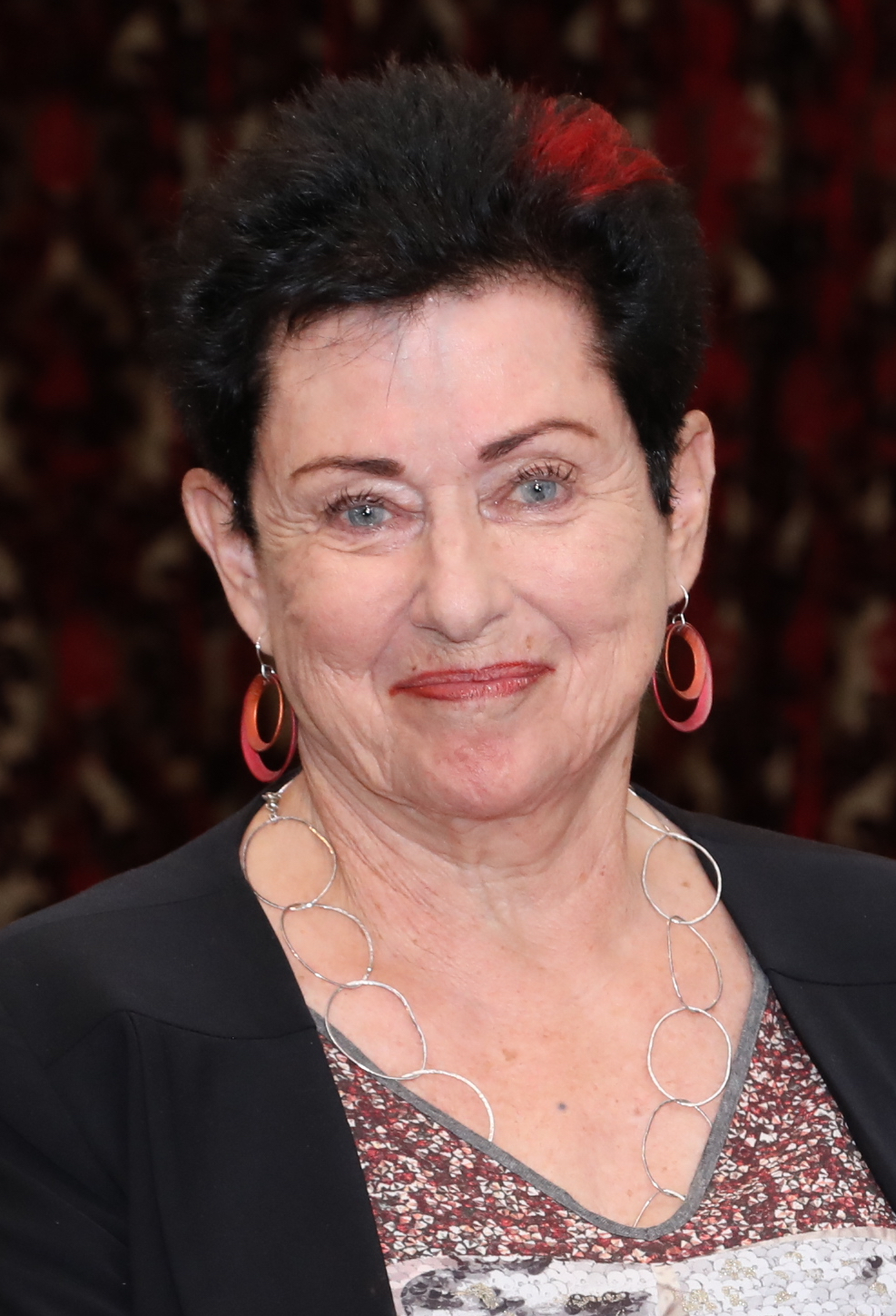
Horrocks in 2019

Shirley Yeta Horrocks ONZM (formerly Heim, née Spitz; born in Auckland) is a New Zealand documentary filmmaker, specialising in social and art topics. She was appointed an Officer of the New Zealand Order of Merit, for services to documentary filmmaking, in the 2019 New Year Honours. The citation notes that "Horrocks is a leader in documentary films on the arts in New Zealand and has directed and produced documentaries for 35 years".

== Education and early career ==
Horrocks' first career was as a high school English teacher in the 1970s, before studying drama at the University of Auckland. As part of her diploma she made a documentary on Theatre Corporate. After completing the diploma Horrocks travelled to New York City, where she explored filmmaking. She returned to New Zealand and became a documentary filmmaker.

She holds a Diploma in Drama, holds a BA, MA(Hons), and MBA from the University of Auckland.

== Documentary career ==
In 1984, Horrocks started a production company, Point of View Productions, which she directs with husband Roger Horrocks. The company specialises in documentaries, drama, education and training programmes.

Horrocks is especially known for her documentaries about New Zealand artists and writers, including artist Len Lye, writer Albert Wendt, poet Allen Curnow, artist John Reynolds, playwright Roger Hall, artist Tom Kreisler, photographer Marti Friedlander and photographer Peter Peryer.

She has also become noted for science documentaries such as Dancing with Atoms, her profile of Sir Paul Callaghan, and Venus: A Quest, about the links between New Zealand and the transit of Venus (which was observed by Captain Cook in 1769). Since 2020 she has been directing the ‘Science &’ series, documentaries focusing on New Zealand’s response to Covid-19, whole genome testing, and emergencies such as the volcanic eruption Whaakari (or White Island). Glenda Lewis has coordinated research. The series is an independent production but has been made with the cooperation of the Prime Minister’s Chief Science Advisor, Dame Juliet Gerrard.

== Filmography ==
- 1992 See What I Mean (Writer, director, producer). On people with a hearing impairment, and those who identify as deaf.
- 1993 Act of Murder (Director, writer, producer). On Miranda Harcourt and her tour of her work Verbatim to prison audiences.
- 1995 Putting our Town on the Map (Producer, writer, director). Television documentary on expressions of small-town identity.
- 1995 Flip and Two Twisters (Writer, producer, director). On artist Len Lye.
- 1996 Kiwiana (Director, producer). On New Zealand fashion, culture, collectibles and personalities.
- 1999 Sweet As (Producer, director). On music festival 'Sweet Waters'.
- 2000 The Real New Zealand (Director, writer). On home-stays in New Zealand.
- 2001 Early Days Yet (Director, producer, writer, researcher). On poet Allen Curnow.
- 2004 Marti: The Passionate Eye (Director). On photographer Marti Friedlander.
- 2005 The New Oceania (Director). On writer Albert Wendt.
- 2006 Who Laughs Last (Director, writer, researcher, producer). On playwright Roger Hall.
- 2007 The Comics Show (Producer, director). On cartoonists and comics in New Zealand.
- 2007 Questions for Mr Reynolds (Director, producer). On artist John Reynolds.
- 2009 Dance of the Instant (Director). On New Zealand modern dance group, New Dance Group.
- 2013 Venus: A Quest (Writer, director, producer). A personal take on the Transit of Venus.
- 2015 Tom Who? The Enigma of Tom Kreisler (Director, producer). On artist Tom Kreisler.
- 2017 Free Theatre: The 37 Year Experiment (Director, producer). On Christchurch based theatre group Free Theatre.
- 2018 Paul Callaghan: Dancing with Atoms (Director, producer). On scientist and science communicator Sir Paul Callaghan.
- 2019 Peter Peryer: The Art of Seeing (Director, producer). On the life and career of photographer Peter Peryer. Peter Peryer: The Art of Seeing is the 12th feature-length documentary directed by Shirley Horrocks to be selected for the NZ International Film Festival.
- 2020-21 Science & (Director, producer). A series of documentaries highlighting the work of New Zealand scientists.

== Personal life ==
Horrocks is married to Roger Horrocks, who founded the Department of Film, Television and Media Studies at Auckland University. Her stepson Dylan Horrocks is a well-known New Zealand cartoonist.
