= Roger Horrocks =

New Zealand writer, film-maker, educator and cultural activist

Roger Horrocks MNZM
- Born: Roger John Horrocks; 4 June 1941 (age 85)
- Education: University of Auckland
- Spouses: 1. Eleanor Seguin; (m. 1964; div. 1979): 2. Shirley Heim (née Spitz); (m. 1979)
- Children: Two: Simone Horrocks and Dylan Horrocks
- Scientific career
- Workplaces: University of Auckland
- Thesis: Mosaic: a study of juxtaposition in literature, as an approach to Pound's Cantos and similar modern poems (1976)
- Doctoral advisor: C. K. Stead
- Other academic advisors: Allen Tate; Thom Gunn; Robert Creeley
- Doctoral students: Cathie Dunsford; Annie Goldson

Roger John Horrocks MNZM (born 4 June 1941) is a New Zealand writer, film-maker, educator and cultural activist.

== Biography ==
Horrocks was born in the Auckland suburb of Mount Albert on 4 June 1941, the son of Jack Horrocks and Edith Barbara Horrocks (née Rhodes). Majoring in English, he completed a BA (1962), MA First Class Honours (1963), and PhD (1976) from the University of Auckland. His doctoral thesis, supervised by C. K. Stead, was titled Mosaic: a study of juxtaposition in literature, as an approach to Pound's Cantos and similar modern poems. He also studied for two years with Allen Tate at the University of Minnesota (1964–65) and one year with Thom Gunn at the University of California, Berkeley (1966). In 1973, receiving a Fellowship from the American Council of Learned Societies, he studied with Robert Creeley at the State University of New York at Buffalo.

In 1964 he married Eleanor Seguin. Their daughter, Simone Horrocks, is a film director, and Dylan Horrocks is a cartoonist and writer. His second marriage, in 1979, was to Shirley Heim (née Spitz), herself a documentary filmmaker, and he became stepfather to Steve and Tony Heim.

He taught at the University of Auckland from 1967 to 2004, and on his retirement became an emeritus professor.

== Honours and awards ==
In the 2005 New Year Honours, Horrocks was appointed a Member of the New Zealand Order of Merit, for services to the film and television industries. Other awards include a Distinguished Teaching Award from the University of Auckland in 1998, a "10K Award" from the Broadcasting Commission (NZ On Air) in 2002 for services to broadcasting, and an Industry Mentor Award at the first New Zealand Scriptwriters Awards in 2010. Also, in 2014 he received a New Zealand History Research Trust Fund Award, and in 2015 a Michael King Writers Centre Residency. In 2019 the Royal Society of New Zealand awarded him its Pou Aronui Prize for his lifetime contribution to the Humanities. The Royal Society described him as "a champion of New Zealand culture, particularly New Zealand's film and television industries, as well as literature and the visual arts."

== Educational work ==
Horrocks was one of the New Zealand pioneers of the academic study of film and television. He taught Film Studies in adult education courses from 1967, then a University of Auckland course at graduate level from 1975. His teaching was timely because a New Zealand film industry was just emerging. Horrocks became Head of the Centre for Film, Television and Media Studies established in 1994, and was appointed Head when it became a full department in 2000. He wrote and edited textbooks (beginning with On Film in 1980) and many academic papers and books (such as Television in New Zealand, which he co-edited with Laurence Simmons in 2004). A number of his students went on to become film-makers, or academics in the field of media studies. (The film-makers include: David Blyth, Vanessa Alexander, Sam Pillsbury, Alison Maclean, Gregor Nicholas, Hester Joyce, Roseanne Liang, Lisa Reihana, Dan Salmon, and Ray Waru. Academics include Brian McDonnell, Trisha Dunleavey, Simon Sigley, Geraldene Peters, Xuelin Zhou, Margaret Henley, and Lynne Star.) He also played a significant part in the establishment of film teaching and media studies in secondary schools. During the 1980s, Horrocks was a co-editor of the influential literary magazines AND (1984–85) and Splash (1984–86), and a Contributing Editor to Parallax (1982-3). Mark Williams in The Oxford History of New Zealand Literature in English has characterised Horrocks as one of 'New Zealand's most alert and inventive critics.' Douglas McNeill in the Journal of New Zealand Literature describes him as 'a close reader's close reader.' Terry Sturm singled out his essay 'The Invention of New Zealand' as a 'seminal' reading of the work of Allen Curnow. A selection of Horrocks's criticism was published as Re-Inventing New Zealand, 2016, and he has also written collections of poetry, including Song of the Ghost in the Machine which was a finalist in the 2016 Ockham New Zealand Book Awards.

== Len Lye ==
Horrocks played a central role in the re-discovery of expatriate film-maker, kinetic sculptor and writer Len Lye. He worked as Lye's assistant during the artist's last year (1980), then after his death he helped to ensure that his papers and works were returned to New Zealand. Horrocks wrote a biography of the artist which was a finalist in the 2002 New Zealand Book Awards and has been described by the British journal Sight and Sound as the "definitive piece of Lye scholarship". His subsequent book, Art That Moves (2009), explores the aesthetics of Lye's "new art of motion." He has also edited three volumes of Lye's writings and co-edited another. In 2012 he wrote the libretto for Len Lye: the Opera, with music by Eve de Castro-Robinson, which was performed at the Maidment Art Centre, with expatriate singer James Harrison returning to New Zealand to play the role of the artist. Horrocks has been a long-term trustee of the Len Lye Foundation and was involved in the creation of the Len Lye Centre which opened in New Plymouth in 2015.

== Public policy work ==
When the Broadcasting Commission (NZ On Air) was created in 1989, Horrocks was appointed as one of the original board members. He served for eleven years, and for the last four years was deputy chair. Horrocks has been one of the founders of many cultural organisations, including the Auckland International Film Festival (established 1969), Alternative Cinema (1972), Association of Film & Television Teachers (later the National Association of Media Educators, 1983), Artspace (1986), NZ Electronic Poetry Centre (2001), NZ On Screen (2006), and Script to Screen (2009). He was a board member for many years of the Auckland University Press (and Board Chairman, 2001–2004), and on the advisory board of Te Ara (from 2002). His other public policy work has included positions in the Arts Council (1975–77 and 1985–7), Creative NZ (1998), and the Short Film Fund of the NZ Film Commission (1985-6).

== Film-making ==
Horrocks was a co-scriptwriter of the feature film Skin Deep (1978). In 1975 he became a co-director of the film company Point of View Productions. Since then he has been the researcher or co-researcher of documentaries directed by his wife Shirley. In 2009 he wrote and directed the film Art that Moves which won the Van Gogh Prize in the 2010 Amsterdam Film Festival.

== Selected bibliography ==
=== About Len Lye ===
- Figures of Motion: Selected Writings of Len Lye, ed. Roger Horrocks and Wystan Curnow (Auckland: Auckland University Press/Oxford University Press, 1984)
- Len Lye, ed. Jean-Michel Bouhours and Roger Horrocks (Paris: Centre Pompidou, 2000).
- Art that Moves: The Work of Len Lye (Auckland: Auckland University Press, 2009).
- Len Lye: A Biography (Auckland: Auckland University Press, 2001; second edition, 2015)
- Zizz!: The Life and Art of Len Lye (Wellington: Awa Press, 2015).
- The Long Dream of Waking: New Perspectives on Len Lye, ed. Paul Brobbel, Wystan Curnow and Roger Horrocks (Christchurch: Canterbury University Press, 2017).

=== Other books ===
- On Film (Auckland: Heinemann, 1980).
- The Auckland Regional Transit Poetry Line (Wellington: Hawk Press/Brick Row, 1982).
- On Film II (Auckland: Heinemann, 1986).
- Television in New Zealand: Programming the Nation, ed. Roger Horrocks and Nick Perry (Melbourne: Oxford University Press, 2004).
- The Song of the Ghost in the Machine (Wellington: Victoria University Press, 2015).
- Re-Inventing New Zealand: Essays on the Arts and the Media (Pokeno: Atuanui Press, 2016).
- Culture in a Small Country: the Arts in New Zealand (Pokeno: Atuanui Press, 2020).
- A Book of Seeing (Pokeno: Atuanui Press, 2022)

=== External links ===
- 'Roger Horrocks,' Episode 51, Cultural Icons (http://culturalicons.co.nz/episode/roger-horrocks)
- 'Roger Horrocks,' NZ On Screen (https://www.nzonscreen.com/person/roger-horrocks)
- Point of View Productions (http://www.pointofview.co.nz/)
