= Diane Brown =

New Zealand novelist and poet

Diane Brown MNZM
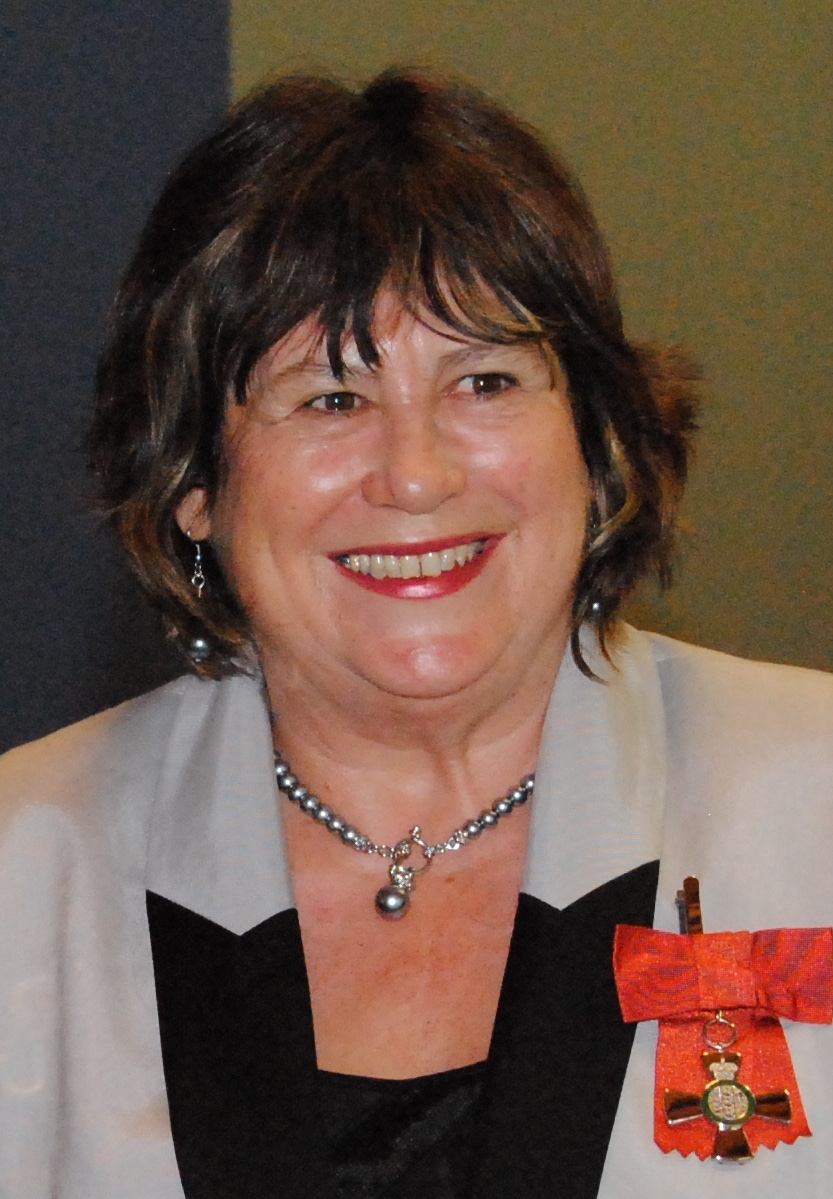
- Brown in 2013
- Born: 1951 (age 74–75)
- Writing career
- Notable awards: Member of the New Zealand Order of Merit
- Website: Official homepage

Diane Edith Brown MNZM (born 1951) is a novelist and poet from New Zealand.

== Background ==
Brown was born in Auckland in 1951. She is based in Dunedin and is married to the author Philip Temple.

== Career ==
Brown has published several novels and poetry collections including:

- Before The Divorce We Go To Disneyland (1997, Tandem Press), poetry
- Learning to Lie Together (2004, Godwit), poetry
- If The Tongue Fits (1999, Tandem Press), novel
- Eight Stages of Grace (2002, Random House), novel
- Every Now and Then I Have a Child (2020), Otago University Press), verse novel

She is also the author of the memoirs Liars and Lovers (2004), Here Comes Another Vital Moment (2006), and Taking My Mother To The Opera (2015).

Poetry by Brown has appeared in literary journals including Landfall, Poetry New Zealand, and New Zealand Listener.

Brown currently runs the creative writing school, Creative Writing Dunedin.

== Awards ==
In the 2013 New Year Honours, Brown was appointed a Member of the New Zealand Order of Merit, in recognition of services as a writer and educator.

Before The Divorce We Go To Disneyland won the 1997 NZSA Jessie Mackay Award for Best First Book of Poetry at the Montana New Zealand Book Awards. Eight Stages of Grace was a finalist in the 2003 Montana New Zealand Book Awards.

Brown was the inaugural fellow at the Michael King Writer's Studio. In 1997 she was awarded the Grimshaw Sargeson Fellowship with Shonagh Koea. She was also awarded the 2013 Beatson Fellowship from Creative New Zealand and in 2012 won the NZSA Janet Frame Memorial Award.
