= Rachel Barrowman =

New Zealand author

- Born: 1963 (age 62–63); Wellington, New Zealand
- Writing career
- Language: English
- Genre: History
- Notable awards: Montana New Zealand Book Award

Rachel Barrowman (born 1963) is a New Zealand author and historian, with a focus on New Zealand cultural and intellectual history.

== Career ==
Barrowman's biography of R.A.K. Mason, Mason: The Life of R.A.K. Mason, won the 2004 Montana New Zealand Book Award in the biography category. In 2006, Barrowman received the Michael King Writer's Fellowship from Creative New Zealand to write a biography of Maurice Gee; she subsequently held a summer residency at the Michael King Writers Centre in 2010. The book, Maurice Gee: Life and Work, was a finalist for the 2016 Ockham New Zealand Book Awards. Barrowman has also received the National Library Fellowship and the Stout Research Centre Fellowship.

== Personal life ==
Barrowman was born and resides in Wellington.

== Published books ==
- A Popular Vision: the Arts and the Left in New Zealand, 1930–1950 (1991, Victoria University Press)
- The Turnbull: a Library and Its World (1995, Auckland University Press)
- Victoria University of Wellington, 1899–1999: A History (1999, Victoria University Press)
- Mason: The Life of R.A.K. Mason (2003, Victoria University Press)
- Maurice Gee: Life and Work (2015, Victoria University Press)

Barrowman is also an editor of the Dictionary of New Zealand Biography.
