= Kōtuku Titihuia Nuttall =

Māori and Coast Salish writer

Kōtuku Titihuia Nuttall is a Māori (Te Āti Awa, Ngāti Tūwharetoa, Ngāti Rangatahi) and Coast Salish writer, whose debut novel Tauhou was published in 2023.

The daughter of New Zealand writer Tina Makereti and a Salish father from Canada, she lived in both New Zealand and British Columbia in childhood.

As of January 2023, she was working on a graduate degree from Te Pūtahi Tuhi Auaha o Te Ao / International Institute of Modern Letters at Victoria University of Wellington.

Tauhou, an exploration of her heritage as a member of two distinct Indigenous peoples from opposite sides of the Pacific Ocean, is written as an alternate reality in which New Zealand and Vancouver Island are much closer together than they are in reality. The book was shortlisted for the 2024 Amazon.ca First Novel Award.
