= Melinda Szymanik =

New Zealand writer

- Born: 1963 (age 62–63); Auckland
- Occupation: Writer
- Website: melindaszymanik.blogspot.com

Melinda Szymanik (born 1963) is an author from New Zealand. She writes picture books, short stories and novels for children and young adults and lives in Auckland, New Zealand.

== Biography ==
Melinda Szymanik was born on 26 December 1963 in Auckland, where she grew up and still lives. As a child, some of her favourite books were Little House on the Prairie by Laura Ingalls Wilder and The Moon in the Cloud by Rosemary Harris, among many others.

She studied at the University of Auckland for a Master of Science in zoology. Later she also completed a Diploma in Business Studies, a Bachelor of Arts in English at Massey University and a Diploma in Children's Literature at the University of Canterbury.

Melinda began writing seriously when her children were small. As well as novels and picture books, she has written short stories that have appeared in anthologies and in the New Zealand School Journal and the Australian School Magazine. She teaches creative writing workshops for adults and children, blogs on writing and the writing life and is a frequent speaker at schools, libraries and other literary events. With a group of other writers, she runs an online writing initiative for children called FABO Story. and is one of the presenters of the “Write like an author” school holiday writing camps.

Melinda was a judge for the 2016 New Zealand Children's and Young Adults Book Awards and has appeared at writers’ festivals across New Zealand, including Storylines Festivals and panel discussions, the Dunedin Writers Festival 2014, the WORD Festival in Christchurch in 2014, True Stories Told Live in Wanaka in 2015, and the Auckland Writers Festival 2014 and 2017.

Melinda's surname (pronounced 'Shi-manic') is Polish, and her Polish family history has always been very important to her. She took part in the Celebrating Everything Polish Festival in Wellington in 2014. Her novel A Winter's Day in 1939 is based on the story of her father's boyhood in Poland and what happened to his family during World War Two, when they were captured by the Russians and sent to a Russian work camp in the country.

== Awards and residencies ==
In 2014, Melinda Szymanik lived in Dunedin for six months as the University of Otago College of Education / Creative New Zealand Children's Writer in Residence. She was the recipient of a University of Otago Wallace Residency at the Pah Homestead, Auckland, in 2015.

Her books have won or been shortlisted for several awards and several have been named as Storylines Notable Books. The Were-Nana won the Children's Choice Award in the picture book category of the NZ Post Children's Book Awards in 2009 and was a Sakura Medal finalist in 2010.

A Winter’s Day in 1939 was a finalist for the Esther Glen Medal for Junior Fiction at the 2014 LIANZA Awards, and won the Librarians' Choice Award. Fuzzy Doodle (ill. Donovan Bixley) was a 2017 selection for a White Ravens book.

== Bibliography ==
- Clever Moo, illustrated by Malcolm Evans (Scholastic, 2006)
- Jack the Viking (Scholastic, 2008)
- The Were-Nana, ill. Sarah N. Anderson (Scholastic NZ, 2008)
- The House That Went to Sea, ill. Gabriella Klepatski (Duck Creek Press, 2011)
- The Half-Life of Ryan Davis (Tale-Spin Media, 2012)
- Made With Love, ill. Gabriella Klepatski (Duck Creek Press, 2012)
- Sally Bangle: Unexpected Detective (Tale-Spin Media, 2012) (e-book only)
- While You Are Sleeping, ill Greg Straight (Duck Creek Press, 2013)
- A Winter's Day in 1939 (Scholastic, 2013)
- The Song of Kauri, ill. Dominique Ford (Scholastic, 2014) (published in Māori as Te Waiata o Kauri)
- Fuzzy Doodle, ill. Donovan Bixley (Scholastic, 2016)
- Time Machine & other stories (The Cuba Press, 2019)
- Sharing with Wolf, ill. Nikki Slade Robinson (Scholastic, 2020)
- Moon and Sun, ill. Malene Laugesen (Upstart Press, 2021)
- My Elephant is Blue, ill. Vasanti Unka (Puffin [Penguin NZ], 2021)
- Lucy and the Dark, ill. Vasanti Unka (Penguin Random House, 2023)
- Sun Shower/ He Tārū Kahika, ill. Joy Te Aho-White, translated by Pānia Papa (Scholastic, 2023)
