= NZSA Janet Frame Memorial Award =

The NZSA Janet Frame Memorial Award was an award for mid-career fiction or poetry writers. It was named after New Zealand writer Janet Frame, who died in 2004, and funded by a gift from the Janet Frame Literary Trust. It was awarded biennially from 2008 to 2016.

== History ==
The NZSA Janet Frame Memorial Award was an award for New Zealand writers of poetry and imaginative fiction.

Janet Frame was a member of the writers’ organisation that is now called the New Zealand Society of Authors, or NZSA (then named the NZ PEN Centre) and had been greatly helped by being awarded the Hubert Church Memorial Award in 1951 for her first book, The Lagoon and other stories. This award was made possible by a bequest to the NZ PEN Centre from Hubert Church's widow in 1945.

A few years after Janet Frame's death, in August 2007, the Janet Frame Literary Trust gave the NZSA a gift to fund an award in her name, to be given to an author of literary or imaginative fiction, or poetry.

The award was first made in 2008 and the fifth and final award was made in 2016. It carried a monetary value of $3,000.

== List of winners by year ==
- 2008: Emma Neale
- 2010: Tim Jones
- 2012: Diane Brown
- 2014: Elizabeth Smither
- 2016: Laurence Fearnley

== See also ==
- List of New Zealand literary awards
