= Kyle Mewburn =

New Zealand writer

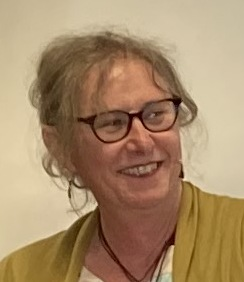
- Born: 1963 (age 62–63); Brisbane, Queensland, Australia
- Occupation: Writer
- Website: kylemewburn.com

Kyle Mewburn (born 1963) is an Australian-New Zealand writer whose books have won many prizes and awards. She lives in Millers Flat, Central Otago, writes picture books and junior fiction and is a popular and well-known speaker at schools and literary festivals.

== Biography ==
Kyle Mewburn was born in 1963 in Brisbane, Australia. She completed a Bachelor of Business Degree at the Queensland Institute of Technology, then travelled across Europe and the Middle East and settled in New Zealand in 1990.

After working at a variety of jobs including journalist, EFL teacher, Environment Centre manager, dishwasher, interviewer, traffic surveyor, apple-picker, machine operator and Kibbutznik, Mewburn became a full-time writer in 1997. She has always loved writing and sees writing for children as her "dream job". Her favourite book as a child was The Phantom Tollbooth by Norton Juster, which she loved for its word games and puns, qualities which also appear in her own work.

Mewburn was President of the New Zealand Society of Authors (PEN NZ Inc) from 2012 to 2016. She visits schools to speak to students about being a writer and to take workshops and has often appeared at literary festivals such as the New Zealand Mountain Film and Book Festival at Wānaka in 2016, the Storylines National Children's Writers and Illustrators' Hui in 2017, the Tamar Valley Writers Festival in Tasmania in 2018 and the National Writers Forum in 2018.

After more than 25 years of hiding her true identity, Mewburn told her wife, Marion, she was transgender. With Marion's support, Mewburn travelled to Argentina in 2017 to receive facial feminisation surgery. In April 2018, she was a panellist in the inaugural Dunedin Pride Festival and in June 2018, she took part in a series of events for Pride Fest, celebrating International Pride Month, organised by Palmerston North City Library. In 2021 her memoir, Faking It: My life in transition, was published by Penguin.

She has spoken out in favour of the move for a New Zealand children's laureate and the recent decision by the World Health Organisation (WHO) to change its definition of transgender from being a mental health disorder.

Mewburn lives with her wife, Marion (a well-known potter), two cats and 24 chickens, in a self-built house with a grass roof in Millers Flat, Central Otago.

== Awards and prizes ==
Mewburn's books have been published in 27 countries and won numerous awards including New Zealand Children's Book of the Year with Old Hu-hu in 2010 and a number of Storylines Notable Book Awards. Mewburn won the Joy Cowley Award (presented by Storylines Children's Literature Foundation of New Zealand) in 2005, and won both the Picture Book Category and the Children's Choice Category with Kiss! Kiss! Yuck! Yuck! at the 2007 New Zealand Post Book Awards for Children and Young Adults.

Mewburn was the University of Otago College of Education / Creative New Zealand Children's Writer in Residence at Otago University in 2011.

== Bibliography ==
- The Hoppleplop (illustrated by Deborah Hinde; Scholastic, 2004)
- The Bear in the Room Next Door (ill. Deborah Hinde; Scholastic NZ, 2006)
- Kiss! Kiss! Yuck! Yuck! (ill. Ali Teo and John O'Reilly; Scholastic NZ, 2006)
- No Room for a Mouse (ill. Freya Blackwood; Scholastic Australia, 2007)
- Muddletopia (Kiwi Bites series; ill. Dave Gunson; Penguin, 2007).
- Duck's Stuck (ill. Ali Teo and John O'Reilly; Scholastic NZ, 2008)
- Ant's Pants (ill. Dave Gunson; Scholastic NZ, 2008)
- Funny Little Dog (Pop Hooper's Perfect Pets series; ill. Heath McKenzie; Little Hare, 2009)
- Scruffy Old Cat (Pop Hooper's Perfect Pets series; ill. Heath McKenzie; Little Hare, 2009)
- Old Hu-hu (ill. Rachel Driscoll; Scholastic NZ, 2009). Te reo retelling by Kāterina Mataira, Hū-Hū Koroheke
- The Eleventh Sheep (ill. Claire Richards; Scholastic, Australia 2008)
- Slowcoach Turtle (Pop Hooper's Perfect Pets series; ill. Heath McKenzie; Little Hare, 2010)
- A Crack in the Sky (ill. Sarah Nelisiwe Anderson; Scholastic, 2010)
- Hill & Hole (ill. Vasanti Unka; Penguin, 2010)
- Daisy's Maze (ill. Michaela Sangl; Scholastic, 2010)
- Hester & Lester (ill. Harriet Bailey; Random House, 2011)
- Dinosaur Rescue: T-Wreck-asaurus (ill. Donovan Bixley; Scholastic, 2011)
- Dinosaur Rescue: Stego-snottysaurus (ill. Donovan Bixley; Scholastic, 2011)
- Dinosaur Rescue: Veloitchy-raptor (ill. Donovan Bixley; Scholastic, 2011)
- Dinosaur Rescue: Diplo-dizzydocus (ill. Donovan Bixley; Scholastic, 2011)
- Moon Cow (ill. Deirdre Copeland; Puffin, 2011)
- The Grumble Bee (ill. Ingrid Berzins; Scholastic, 2011)
- Do Not Push (ill. Sarah Nelisiwe Anderson; Scholastic, 2011)
- Three Cheers for No-Ears! (ill. Deborah Hinde; Scholastic, 2011). Te reo retelling by Kāterina Mataira, He Mihi Nui mo Taringa-Kore!
- Bog Frog Hop (ill. Rebecca Cool; Little Hare, 2012)
- Melu (ill. Ali Teo and John O'Reilly; Scholastic, 2012)
- Seesaw Po (ill. Katz Cowley; Scholastic, 2012)
- Dinosaur Rescue: Spino-rottysaurus (ill. Donovan Bixley; Scholastic, 2012)
- Blue Gnu (ill. Daron Parton; Scholastic NZ, 2012)
- Dako-snappysaurus (ill. Donovan Bixley; Scholastic NZ, 2013)
- Scuto-stickysaurus (ill. Donovan Bixley; Scholastic NZ, 2013)
- Salto-Scerdypus (ill. Donovan Bixley; Scholastic NZ, 2013)
- Tumble Ted (ill. Mat Russell; Scholastic NZ, 2013)
- Chick's sick! (ill. Ali Teo and John O'Reilly; Scholastic NZ, 2013)
- Luther and the cloud-makers (ill. Sarah Nelisiwe Anderson; Scholastic NZ, 2013)
- A perfect chirpy Christmas (ill. Patrick McDonald; Random House, 2013)
- Dragon Knight - Fire! (ill. Donovan Bixley; Scholastic NZ, 2015)
- Dragon Knight - Rats! (ill. Donovan Bixley; Scholastic NZ, 2015)
- Dragon Knight - Witch! (ill. Donovan Bixley; Scholastic NZ, 2015)
- 'Dragon Knight - Dragons! (ill. Donovan Bixley; Scholastic NZ, 2015)
- The House on the Hill (ill. Sarah Davis; Scholastic NZ, 2016)
- Dinosaur Trouble – The Great Egg Stink (Scholastic NZ, 2017)
- Dinosaur Trouble – The Lava Melt Shake (Scholastic NZ, 2017)
- Dinosaur Trouble – The Runaway Coat (Scholastic NZ, 2017)
- Dinosaur Trouble – The Secret Hunt (Scholastic NZ, 2018)
- We Saw a Spinosaurus (ill. Daron Parton; Scholastic NZ, 2022)
- Have you seen tomorrow? (ill. Laura Bee Bernard; Penguin, 2022)
