= Chris Else =

New Zealand author (born 1942)

Chris Else (born 1942) is the New Zealand author of novels, collections of short stories, and poems.

Chris Else, 2009

== Biography ==
Born in Cottingham, Yorkshire in the United Kingdom, Chris Else emigrated to New Zealand in 1956.

He was educated at Auckland Grammar School and the University of Auckland.

Else has worked in teaching, bookselling and data-processing. Currently he is a literary agent, technical writing consultant and partner with his wife and fellow novelist, Barbara Else, in a Wellington editorial agency, TFS Literary Agency and Manuscript Assessment Service, which among other contributions is credited by Alan Duff for ‘visionary advice’ in the acknowledgments to Once Were Warriors.

While he was at the Auckland Teachers' Training College, he was awarded the 64 Literature Cup in successive years, 1965 and 1966.

In 2005, he was elected President of The New Zealand Society of Authors (Pen NZ).

In 2007, he was appointed Chairman of Directors of Copyright Licensing Limited and in that year also was Writer in Residence at King's College, Auckland.

In 2011, Else was awarded the Autumn Residency at the Michael King Writers Centre in Devonport, Auckland, to work on a major new novel which explores how New Zealand society began to change in the 1960s and 1970s.

== Literary works ==
=== Novels ===
Dates given record the date of first publication:

- 1992. Why Things Fall, Tandem Press
- 1998. Brainjoy, Tandem Press
- 2001. The Beetle in the Box, Random House (Vintage)
- 2004. On River Road, Random House (Vintage)
- 2007. Black Earth White Bones, Random House (Vintage)
- 2008. Gith, Random House (Vintage)
- 2019. Waterline, Quentin Wilson Publishing

=== Stories ===
- 1981. Dreams of Pythagoras, Voice Press
- 1997. Endangered Species, Hazard Press
