= Barbara Else =

New Zealand writer (born 1947)

Barbara Else MNZM
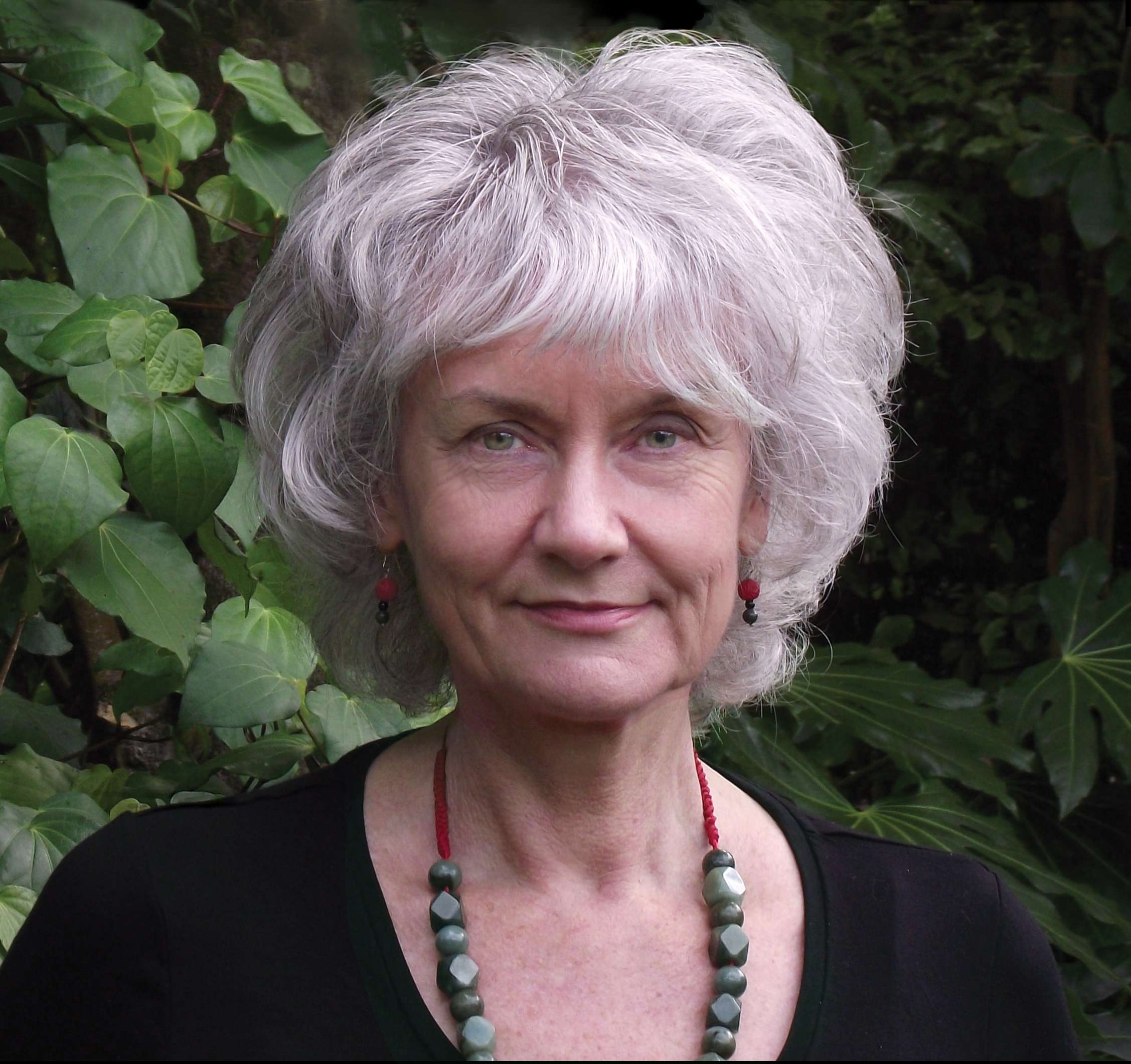
- Born: 8 January 1947; Invercargill, New Zealand
- Other name: Barbara Neale
- Education: University of Otago
- Occupation: Writer
- Spouse: Chris Else
- Children: 2

Barbara Helen Else MNZM (born 1947), previously known as Barbara Neale, is a New Zealand writer, editor, and playwright. She has written novels for adults and children, plays, short stories and articles and has edited anthologies of children's stories. She has received a number of awards and fellowships including the New Zealand Order of Merit for services to literature, the Storylines Margaret Mahy Medal and the Victoria University of Wellington's Writer's Fellowship and The Prime Minister’s Award for Literature.

== Biography ==
Barbara Else was born in Invercargill, New Zealand in 1947. She lived in Riverton until age two, when her family moved to Wellington. She has lived in various parts of New Zealand, including Auckland, Oamaru, Christchurch and Dunedin as well as in San Diego, California.

She graduated with an MA from Otago University in 1969 and has worked as a university tutor, an editor and a freelance writer. Her first husband, Jim Neale, was a physician. They had two daughters.

She is a Member of the Academy of NZ Literature and has served on the New Zealand Book Council and on the National Council of the New Zealand Society of Authors (PEN NZ Inc). Barbara Else and her husband, Chris Else, were instrumental in setting up both the New Zealand Association of Literary Agents (NZALA) and the New Zealand Association of Manuscript Assessors (NZAMA)

She was a judge for the New Zealand Post Book Awards for Children and Young Adults in 2004 and Judge Convenor for the 2014 New Zealand Children's Book Awards, and has appeared at local and international writer and reader festivals.

As of 2016, Else lives in Dunedin, having stayed there after her residency in 2016. She works as a literary agent and manuscript assessor with Chris Else who is also a writer, as is her daughter Emma Neale. In her 2023 memoir, Laughing at the Dark, Else details her treatment for cancer.

== Awards and residencies ==
Else's books have won or been shortlisted for a number of awards and several of her children's books have been named as Storylines Notable Books. Her first novel The Warrior Queen was shortlisted for the Montana New Zealand Book Awards. Her next title, Gingerbread Husbands, was shortlisted for the Booksellers BookData Award. The Travelling Restaurant (the first in her fantasy quartet for children, Tales of Fontania) won the 2012 Junior Fiction Honour Award in the New Zealand Post Children's Book Awards, the Esther Glen Medal in the 2012 LIANZA Awards and a White Raven Award and was named as a 2012 IBBY NZ Honour Book for Writing. Go Girl: a storybook of epic NZ Women was shortlisted in the NZ Book Awards for Children and Young Adults Non-fiction Category 2019. Laughing at the Dark, a memoir was shortlisted in the Ockham NZ Book Awards General Non-fiction Category 2024.

In 1998, Else was the NZ/Australia Exchange Writer (Brisbane Writers’ Festival, Sydney Spring Festival). Else was a visiting writer at Vancouver International Writers' Festival and the Winnipeg International Writers' Festival. She was Writer in Residence at Victoria University of Wellington in 1999. In 2004, she was awarded a Creative New Zealand Scholarship in Letters and in 2005, she became a Member of the New Zealand Order of Merit (MNZM) for Services to Literature.

In 2016, Else went to Dunedin as the University of Otago College of Education / Creative New Zealand Children's Writer in Residence, a move that led to her moving permanently to that city. In the same year, she was awarded the Storylines Margaret Mahy Medal and Lecture Award. She delivered the Storylines Margaret Mahy Medal Lecture, titled "Making it up as I go along, or Finding the Cornerstones of Creativity", on 3 April 2016. She also delivered the Margaret Mahy Memorial Lecture at the WORD Christchurch Writers & Readers Festival in 2018. In 2019 she was presented with the Ignition Festival Award for outstanding contribution to children's literature.

In 2024, Else was named New Zealand Society of Authors President of Honour. In 2025, she received the Prime Minister's Award for Literary Achievement ‘recognising outstanding contribution to New Zealand fiction’.

== Bibliography ==
=== As author ===
- The Warrior Queen (Godwit Publishing, 1995)
- Gingerbread Husbands (Godwit Publishing, 1997)
- Skitterfoot Leaper (HarperCollins NZ, 1997)
- Eating Peacocks (Random House; Vintage, 1998)
- Tricky Situations (Random House, 1999)
- Three Pretty Widows (Random House; Vintage, 2000)
- The Case of the Missing Kitchen (Random House; Vintage 2003)
- Wild Latitudes (Random House; Vintage, 2007)
- The Travelling Restaurant (Gecko Press, 2011) ISBN 9781877467776
- The Queen and the Nobody Boy (Gecko Press, 2012) ISBN 9781877579233
- The Volume of Possible Endings (Gecko Press, 2014) ISBN 9781927271377
- The Knot Impossible (Gecko Press, 2015) ISBN 9781776570041
- Go Girl (Penguin Random House, 2018)
- Harsu and the Werestoat (Gecko Press, 2019) ISBN 9781776572199
- The Pets We Have Killed (Quentin Wilson Publishing 2024) ISBN 978-1-991103-41-3

=== As editor ===
- Grand Stands (Vintage, 2000)
- Another 30 New Zealand Stories for Children, illustrated by David Elliot (Random House, 2002)
- 30 Weird & Wonderful New Zealand Stories, ill. by Philip Webb (Random House, 2003)
- Claws & Jaws: 30 New Zealand Animal Stories, ill. by Philip Webb (Random House, 2004)
- Like Wallpaper: New Zealand Short Stories for Teenagers (Random House, 2005)
- Mischief & Mayhem: 30 New Zealand Stories ill. by Philip Webb (Random House, 2005)
- Hideous & Hilarious: 30 New Zealand Historical Stories, ill. by Philip Webb (Random House, 2006)
- Dare and Double-dare: 30 Sports Stories for Children (Random House, 2007)
- Showtime!: 30 NZ Stories for Children (Random House, 2008)
- Great Mates: 30 NZ Stories for Children (Random House, 2011)

=== Memoir ===
- Laughing at the Dark (Penguin, 2023) ISBN 9780143777618
