= Tina Makereti =

New Zealand writer

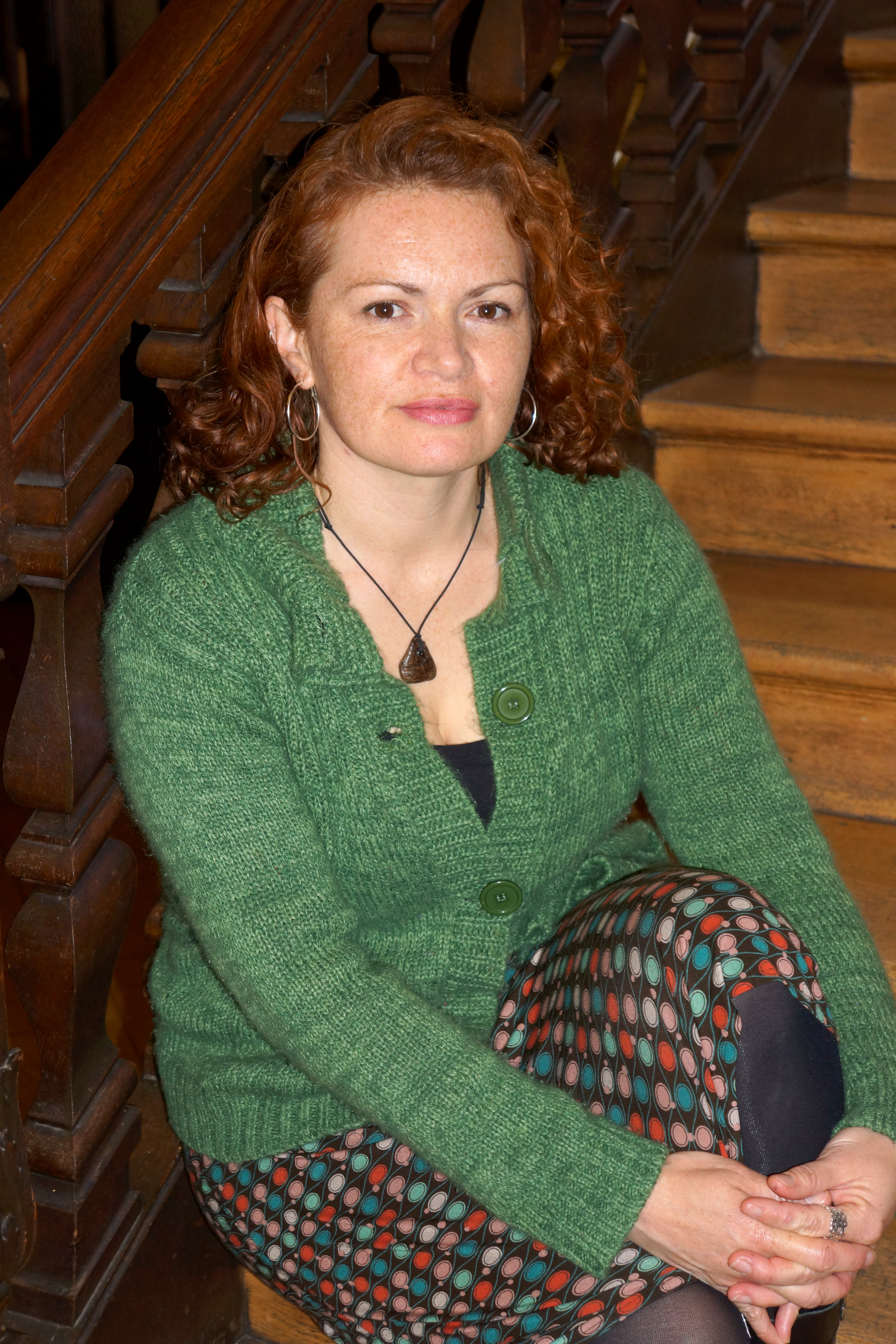
- Makereti in 2012
- Born: Kawakawa, Northland Region, New Zealand
- Education: Victoria University of Wellington (MA)
- Occupations: Writer, novelist, essayist, editor, creative writing teacher
- Years active: 2008-present
- Children: Kotuku

Tina Makereti is a New Zealand novelist, essayist, and short story writer, editor and creative writing teacher. Her work has been widely published and she has been the recipient of writing residencies in New Zealand and overseas. Her book Once Upon a Time in Aotearoa won the inaugural fiction prize at the Ngā Kupu Ora Māori Book Awards in 2011, and Where the Rēkohu Bone Sings won the Ngā Kupu Ora Aotearoa Māori Book Award for Fiction in 2014.

== Biography ==
Makereti was born in Kawakawa and grew up in different parts of the North Island, including Auckland. She is of Ngāti Tūwharetoa, Te Ati Awa, Ngāti Rangatahi, Pākehā and, according to family stories, Moriori descent. She studied in Palmerston North and graduated with a BA Social Sciences (1994) and PGDip Maori Studies (2007) from Massey University.

In 2008, she completed an MA in creative writing at Victoria University of Wellington. Her MA work led to the publication of her short story collection, Once Upon a Time in Aotearoa. Her PhD in Creative Writing (2013), also from Victoria University of Wellington, used indigenous literature and perspectives to explore ideas of identity and how this is understood and transmitted following colonisation.

In 2014, she was convenor of the first Māori and Pasifika Writing Workshop (Te Hiringa a Tuhi) at the International Institute of Modern Letters, Victoria University.

She has taught creative writing in The School of English and Media Studies at Massey University, and since February 2020, is Senior Lecturer at Victoria University of Wellington's International Institute of Modern Letters and School of English.

Her writing has appeared in many literary journals, magazines and anthologies including Sport, The NZ Listener, Metro, Huia Short Stories 8, Hue and Cry, JAAM, Turbine, Overland Aotearoa and Landfall. She has presented her work around New Zealand and overseas in Frankfurt, Jamaica, Taipei, Toronto and the United Kingdom.

While her 2018 novel The Imaginary Lives of James Pōneke has been described as based on the life of Hemi Pomara, the Author's note to the novel is clear that the novel 'in no way represents the real historical figure'.

She lives on the Kāpiti Coast. Her daughter, Kōtuku Titihuia Nuttall, is also a writer, whose debut novel Tauhou was published in 2023.

== Awards and prizes ==
Makereti's first book, Once Upon a Time in Aotearoa, won the inaugural fiction prize at the Ngā Kupu Ora Māori Book Awards in 2011. Where the Rēkohu Bone Sings was longlisted for the Dublin Literary Award 2016 and won the 2014 Ngā Kupu Ora Aotearoa Māori Book Award for Fiction.

In 2009, Makereti won the non-fiction category of the Royal Society of New Zealand Manhire Prize for Creative Science Writing with her piece Twitch and the Pikihuia Award for Best Short Story Written in English for Skin and Bones. She was Regional Winner, Pacific, of the 2016 Commonwealth Short Story Prize with her story, 'Black Milk'.

In 2012, she was Writer in Residence at the Museum der Weltkulturen in Frankfurt. During her tenure there, she opened the Frankfurt walk which featured New Zealand authors and reproduced part of the Wellington Writers Walk.

In 2013, she was the New Zealand Film Archive Curator-at-Large, using film material such as home movie footage, news and advertisements to create a series of exhibitions exploring the social history of childhood in Aotearoa New Zealand. She was the 2014 Randell Cottage Writer in Residence and in the same year she took part in Roadwords, a literary tour of southern South Island towns, with three other writers. In 2016, she was awarded the 2016 NZSA Peter & Dianne Beatson Fellowship.

In 2022, Tina Makereti's Lumpectomy won the Landfall Essay Competition.

Her novel, The Mires, was a finalist for the Jann Medlicott Acorn Prize for Fiction at the 2025 Ockham New Zealand Book Awards. The following year, This Compulsion in Us, a nonfiction collection of essays, won the General Non-fiction Award at the same awards. The judges said her book was "an alternative memoir of one person’s discoveries about her whakapapa and childhood family, and her place in national society and within Māori literature".

== Bibliography ==
- Once Upon a Time in Aotearoa (Huia Publishers, 2010) ISBN 9781869694166
- Where the Rēkohu Bone Sings (Random House, 2014) ISBN 9781775535188
- Black Marks on the White Page (RHNZ: Vintage, 2017) (an anthology of Māori and Pasifika fiction, edited with Witi Ihimaera) ISBN 9780143770299
- The Imaginary Lives of James Pōneke (RHNZ: Vintage, 2018) ISBN 9780143771562
- Landfall 244: Spring 2022, edited by Lynley Edmeades (Otago University Press, 2022)
- The Mires (Ultimo Press, 2024) ISBN 9781761153693
- This Compulsion in Us (Te Herenga Waka University Press, 2025) ISBN 9781776562299
