= Shonagh Koea =

New Zealand writer

- Born: 1939 (age 86–87); Taranaki, New Zealand
- Occupation: Writer

Shonagh Maureen Koea (born 1939) is a New Zealand fiction writer.

== Biography ==
Koea was born in Taranaki, New Zealand, in 1939, and grew up in Hastings, Hawke's Bay. She became a journalist and began working at the Taranaki Herald newspaper in New Plymouth. There she met and married a fellow journalist, George Koea of Te Āti Awa. She wrote novels as a pastime; however none were published. In her late 20s Koea stopped writing fiction, disillusioned with her lack of success. However, ten years later, in 1981, she submitted a story to New Zealand's leading literary contest of the time (the Air New Zealand Short Story Competition) and won. Her stories began to be published in magazines such as The Listener.

Koea's husband died in 1987, and in 1990 she moved to Auckland. Since then, she has been a full-time writer; she has received a number of literary grants and fellowships, and produced novels, short stories and memoirs.

== Works ==
Recurring themes in Koea's writing are personal relationships and their difficulties, and men's and women's roles in the family. Male characters are often oppressive, and females initially helpless; after a period, however, the women eventually take charge of their own destiny. Her narratives have been likened to those of fellow New Zealand writers Katherine Mansfield and Frank Sargeson, which also centred on familiar characters and situations.

Koea's main publisher is Random House.

=== Collections of short stories ===
- 1987 - The Woman Who Never Went Home and Other Stories
- 1993 - Fifteen Rubies by Candlelight
- 2013 - The Best of Shonagh Koea's Short Stories

=== Novels ===
- 1989 - The Grandiflora Tree
- 1992 - Staying Home and Being Rotten
- 1994 (and reissued in 2007) - Sing To Me, Dreamer
- 1996 - The Wedding at Bueno-Vista
- 1998 - The Lonely Margins of the Sea
- 2001 - Time for Killing
- 2003 - Yet Another Ghastly Christmas
- 2007 - The Kindness of Strangers: Kitchen Memoirs
- 2013 - Rain
- 2014 - Landscape with Solitary Figure

=== Awards and recognition ===
- Winner, Air New Zealand Short Story Competition, 1981
- Queen Elizabeth II Literature Committee Writing Bursary, 1989 and 1992
- University of Auckland Fellowship in Literature, 1993
- Buddle Finlay Sargeson Fellowship, 1997
- The Lonely Margins of the Sea was runner up for the Deutz Medal for Fiction in the 1999 Montana New Zealand Book Awards
- Sing to Me, Dreamer was a finalist in the 1995 New Zealand Post Book Awards
