= Lawrence Patchett =

New Zealand writer and editor

Lawrence Patchett is a New Zealand novelist, short story writer, and editor. His book of short stories, I Got His Blood on Me, won the Best First Book award at the 2013 New Zealand Post Book Awards. Following this Patchett released his debut novel, The Burning River in 2019. Patchett has held several writing residencies in New Zealand, including the Michael King Emerging Writer's Residency.

== Biography ==
Lawrence Patchett was born in Canterbury, New Zealand. He is Pākehā with ancestors from Shetland, Ireland and the UK. He studied English at the University of Canterbury and completed a Masters, and then a PhD, in Creative Writing at Te Herenga Waka Victoria University of Wellington, finishing in 2012. He is a member of the Institute of Professional Editors and the New Zealand Society of Authors.

== Awards and prizes ==
- 2013 NZSA Hubert Church Best First Book of Fiction at the New Zealand Book Awards
- 2018 Michael King Emerging Writer's Residency
- 2019 University of Canterbury Ursula Bethell Residency
- NZ Pacific Studio Artist's Residency

== Bibliography ==
- I Got His Blood on Me (Te Herenga Waka University Press, 2012) ISBN 9780864737687
- The Burning River (Te Herenga Waka University Press, 2019) ISBN 9781776562237

== Critical reception ==
I Got His Blood on Me received positive reviews and Michael Larson in the New Zealand Herald described it as a "remarkable collection". Reviews of The Burning River at the time of publication were generally favorable, although one critic's viewpoint was that it did not go far enough to address issues of colonisation in New Zealand.
