= List of New Zealand writers =

Writers who have contributed to New Zealand literature include:

== A ==
- Michèle A'Court (born 1961), comedian, memoirist and non-fiction writer
- Avis Acres (1910–1994), artist, writer, illustrator and conservationist
- Pip Adam (living), fiction writer and reviewer
- Arthur Henry Adams (1872–1936), journalist, poet, novelist and playwright
- Catherine Adamson (1868–1925), diarist
- Fleur Adcock (1934–2024), poet and editor
- Pinky Agnew (born 1955), author, playwright and social commentator
- Sarona Aiono-Iosefa (born 1962), children's fiction writer
- George Alderton (1854–1942, newspaper editor and journalist
- Fred Alexander (1882–1957), editor, journalist and poetry anthologist
- Vanessa Alexander (living), screenwriter, producer, director
- Margaret Alington (1920–2012), librarian, historian and author
- Colin Allan (1921–1993), non-fiction writer
- Harry Allan (1882–1957), botany writer
- Rob Allan (1945–2021), poet
- Rosetta Allan (living), poet and novelist
- Pamela Allen (born 1934), children's writer and illustrator
- Geoff Alley (1903–1986), rugby writer
- Michele Amas (1961–2016), poet, playwright and actress
- Barbara Anderson (1926–2013), fiction writer
- Mona Anderson (1909–2004), memoirist, children's writer
- Isobel Andrews (1905–1990), poet, playwright and short story writer
- Frank Anthony (1891–1927), short story writer and novelist
- Michalia Arathimos (living), short story writer and novelist
- K. O. Arvidson (1938–2011), poet and academic
- Sylvia Ashton-Warner (1908–1984), writer, poet and educator
- Tusiata Avia (born 1966), poet and children's author

== B ==
- Annette Baier (1929–2012), philosopher and non-fiction writer
- Denis Baker (born 1966), novelist and short story writer
- Hinemoana Baker (born 1968), poet, musician and recording artist
- Louisa Alice Baker (1856–1926), journalist and novelist
- Murray Ball (1939–2017), cartoonist
- Philippa Ballantine (born 1971), author of speculative fiction
- David Ballantyne (1924–1986), journalist and fiction writer
- Serie Barford (living), performance poet
- Mary Anne Barker (Lady Barker) (1831–1911), poet and non-fiction writer
- John Barr (1809–1889), poet
- Miriam Barr (born 1982), page and performance poet
- Sarah Maria Barraud (1823–1895), letter-writer and housewife
- Rachel Barrowman (born 1963), author and historian
- Amelia Batistich (1915–2004), novelist, short story writer and memoirist
- Blanche Baughan (1870–1958), poet, writer and penal reformer
- James K. Baxter (1926–1972), poet and playwright
- Kay Baxter (born 1952/53), horticulturist
- Arthur Baysting (1947–2019), journalist, screenwriter, children's writer and poet
- Ann Beaglehole (born 1948), historian and novelist
- Helen Beaglehole (born 1946), children's writer and historian
- John Beaglehole (1901–1971), historian
- Fleur Beale (born 1945), young adult novelist
- Margaret Beames (1935–2016), children's book novelist
- Airini Beautrais (born 1982), poet and short-story writer
- Bernard Beckett (born 1967), young adult novelist
- George Bell (1809–1899), editor and journalist
- James Belich (born 1956), historian
- Francis Oswald Bennett (1898–1976), medical historian and biographer
- Joe Bennett (born 1957), non-fiction writer and columnist
- Marlene J Bennetts (born 1938), poet and children's author
- Jeanne Bernhardt (born 1961), poet, novelist and short story writer
- Ursula Bethell (1874–1945), poet and social worker
- Jean Betts (living), playwright, actor and director
- Graham Billing (1936–2001), novelist, journalist and poet
- Victor Billot (living), poet, journalist and editor
- Judith Binney (1940–2011), writer, academic and historian
- Hera Lindsay Bird (born 1987), poet
- Gavin Bishop (born 1946), children's author and illustrator
- Donovan Bixley (born 1971), illustrated biographer and children's book writer
- Ellen Blackwell (1864–1952), writer and botanist
- Geoff Blackwell (living), non-fiction writer
- Paddy Blanchfield (1911–1980), poet
- Arapera Blank (1932–2002), poet and teacher
- James Bodell (c. 1831–1892), memoirist
- Paula Boock (born 1964), writer and editor
- Ivan Bootham (1939–2016), fiction writer, poet and composer
- Jenny Bornholdt (born 1960), poet and anthologist
- Michael Botur (born 1984), poet and fiction writer
- Avice Maud Bowbyes (1901–1992), home science lecturer and writer
- Thomas Bracken (1843–1898), poet, journalist and politician
- Charles Brasch (1909–1973), poet, literary editor and arts patron
- Errol Brathwaite (1924–2005), author
- Virginia Braun (fl. 2000s), gender studies expert, psychologist and non-fiction writer
- Freda Bream (1918–1996), teacher and writer
- Diana Bridge (born 1942), poet
- Bub Bridger (1924–2009), poet and short story writer
- Adele Broadbent (born 1968), children's author
- Ben Brown (born 1962), children's author, poet
- Deidre Brown (born 1970), art historian and historical lecturer
- Diane Brown (born 1951), novelist and poet
- Helen Brown (born 1954), novelist and columnist
- Justin Brown (born 1973) (also writes as Justin Christopher), non-fiction writer and children's author
- Riwia Brown (born 1957), playwright and screenwriter
- Audrey Brown-Pereira (born 1975), poet, diplomat and public servant
- Harriet Louisa Browne (1829–1906), political salon hostess, community leader and letter-writer
- Bryan Bruce (born 1948), non-fiction writer and documentarian
- Frank Bruno (1910–1967) writer and cartoonist
- George Bryant (born 1938), non-fiction and Christian writer
- Rachel Buchanan (born 1968), author and historian
- Lindsay Buick (1866–1938), politician, journalist and historian
- Margaret Bullock (1845–1903), journalist, writer, feminist and social reformer
- Norah Burnard (1902–1979), journal editor
- Rachel Bush (1941–2016), poet
- Dorothy Butler (1925–2015), children's book author, bookseller, memoirist and reading advocate

== C ==
- Dolce Ann Cabot (1862–1943), early newspaper editor
- Octavia Cade (living), climate fiction novelist
- John Cairney (1898–1966), anatomy textbook writer
- Judy Callingham (living), scriptwriter, television presenter and journalist
- Kirsty Cameron (living), screenwriter
- Kate Camp (born 1972), poet and author
- Alistair Te Ariki Campbell (1925–2009), poet, playwright and novelist
- Arnold Campbell (1906–1980), educationalist and non-fiction writer
- Meg Campbell (1937–2007), poet
- Sarah Campion (1906–2002), pseudonym of Mary Rose Alpers, novelist and social activist
- Dulce Carman (1883—1970), romance writer
- Clyde Carr (1886–1962), politician, church minister and poet
- Una Carter (1890–1954), cookbook writer
- John Caselberg (1927–2004), poet, playwright, short story writer, essayist
- Bruce Cathie (1930–2013), ufologist writer
- Christine Cole Catley (1922–2011), journalist, publisher and author
- Ken Catran (born 1944), children's novelist and screenwriter
- Eleanor Catton (born 1985), novelist and screenwriter
- Frances Caverhill (1834–1897), diarist
- Gordon Challis (1932–2018), poet
- Lynda Chanwai-Earle (born 1965), writer and radio producer
- William Chapple (1864–1936), eugenics and medical writer
- Janet Charman (born 1954), poet
- Brenda Chawner (living), library academic
- Frances Cherry (1937–2022), novelist, short story writer and children's writer
- Catherine Chidgey (born 1970), fiction writer
- Harrison Christian (born 1990), journalist and historical writer
- Daphne Clair (born 1939), romance novelist and activist
- Kate Clark (1847–1926), children's writer, poet, artist and community worker
- Margaret Clark (born 1941), political scientist and writer
- Paul Cleave (born 1974), crime novelist
- Constance Clyde (1872–1951), novelist, travel writer and suffragette
- Nellie Coad (1883–1974), teacher, community leader and non-fiction writer
- Geoff Cochrane (1951–2022), poet, novelist and short story writer
- Gina Cole (born 1960), lawyer, short story writer and novelist
- Elizabeth Colenso (1821–1904), missionary, teacher and Bible translator
- Glenn Colquhoun (born 1964), poet and doctor
- Jennifer Compton (born 1949), poet and playwright
- Sandra Coney (born 1944), local politician, writer, feminist, historian and women's health campaigner
- Hugh Cook (1956–2008), science fiction writer
- Kay McKenzie Cooke (born 1953), poet
- Sue Copsey (born 1960), children's author and editor
- Judy Corbalis (living), fiction writer
- Violet May Cottrell (1887–1971), writer, poet and spiritualist
- James Courage (1903–1963), fiction writer, poet and bookseller
- David Coventry (born 1969), novelist and musician
- Winston Cowie (born 1982), novelist and historian
- Joy Cowley (born 1936), author of children's fiction
- Rachael Craw (living), novelist and teacher
- Douglas Cresswell (1894–1960), author, historian and broadcaster
- Mary Cresswell (born 1937), science editor and poet
- D'Arcy Cresswell (1896–1960), poet, journalist and writer
- Fiona Cross (fl. 2000s), arachnologist and non-fiction writer
- Barry Crump (1935–1996), author of semi-autobiographical comic novels
- Majella Cullinane (living), poet and novelist
- Jackie Cumming (fl. 2000s), academic, health expert and non-fiction writer
- Allen Curnow (1911–2001), poet and journalist

== D ==
- Lois Daish (fl. 1960s), food writer and cookbook writer
- Debra Daley (living), novelist
- Ruth Dallas (1919–2008), poet and children's writer
- Bob Darroch (born 1940), illustrator, author and cartoonist
- Lynn Davidson (born 1959), novelist, poet and memoirist
- Dan Davin (1913–1990), novelist, non-fiction writer and editor
- Winnie Davin (1909–1995), teacher, community worker, writer and editor
- Jackie Davis (born 1963), author, poet, and playwright
- Leigh Davis (1955–2009), poet
- Kate De Goldi (born 1959), novelist, children's writer and short story writer
- Joan de Hamel (1924–2011), children's author
- Geoffrey Potocki de Montalk (1903–1997), poet and polemicist
- Stephanie de Montalk (born 1945), poet and biographer
- Elena de Roo (living), poet and children's author
- John Dennison (born 1978), poet
- Pip Desmond (living), author and journalist
- George E. Dewar (1891–1969), poet and writer
- Jean Devanny (1894–1962), author and communist
- Bill Direen (living), writer, musician, and performer
- Gillian Dobbie (fl. 2000s), computer scientist, academic and non-fiction writer
- Lynley Dodd (born 1941), children's author and illustrator
- Alfred Domett (1811–1887), fourth Premier of New Zealand and poet
- Robyn Donald (born 1940), romance novelist
- Basil Dowling (1910–2000), poet
- Melanie Drewery (born 1970), children's author and illustrator
- Joan Druett (born 1935), historian and novelist
- Alison Drummond (1903–1984), historian and editor
- Sam Duckor-Jones (born 1982), sculptor, poet, and artist
- Marilyn Duckworth (born 1935), fiction writer and poet
- Tessa Duder (born 1940), young people's, fiction and non-fiction writer and playwright
- Alan Duff (born 1950), novelist and newspaper columnist
- Yvonne du Fresne (1929–2011), fiction writer and playwright
- Eileen Duggan (1894–1972), poet and journalist
- Maurice Duggan (1922–1974), fiction writer
- Kate Duignan (born 1974), fiction writer and reviewer
- Beverley Dunlop (1935–2023), children's writer, novelist and short story writer
- Cathie Dunsford (born 1953), novelist, poet and anthologist
- Hedda Dyson (1857–1951), journalist and magazine editor

== E ==
- Elisabeth Easther (born 1970), journalist and playwright
- Dorothy Eden (1912–1982), Gothic fiction writer
- Lynley Edmeades (living), poet, academic, and editor
- Lauris Edmond (1924–2000), poet and writer
- Mihi Edwards (1918–2008), memoirist
- Brendon Egan (born 1984), sports writer
- David Eggleton (born 1952), poet, writer, and performer
- Jill Eggleton (living), children's author and education consultant
- Stevan Eldred-Grigg (born 1952), novelist and historian
- Ellen Elizabeth Ellis (1829–1895), feminist and writer
- Barbara Else (born 1947), novelist, short story writer, editor, and literary agent
- Chris Else (born 1942), fiction writer and poet
- Bronwyn Elsmore (living), fiction and non-fiction writer and playwright
- Riemke Ensing (born 1939), poet
- Margaret Escott (1908–1977), novelist, drama teacher, and poet
- Barbara Ewing (born 1939), actress, playwright, and novelist

== F ==
- Jacqueline Fahey (born 1929), painter and writer
- A. R. D. Fairburn (1904–1957), poet
- Tracy Farr (born 1962), novelist and short story writer
- Fiona Farrell (born 1947), poet, fiction writer and playwright
- Angie Farrow (born 1951), academic and writer for theatre and radio
- Laurence Fearnley (born 1963), short-story writer, novelist and non-fiction writer
- Gigi Fenster (born 1963/64), novelist, creative writing teacher and law lecturer
- Joan Fleming (born 1984), poet, non-fiction writer and academic
- Beryl Fletcher (1938–2018), feminist novelist
- Tui Flower (1925–2017), food writer
- Mihingarangi Forbes (born 1972/73), journalist and radio broadcaster
- Margot Forde (1935–1995), botanist, taxonomist and writer
- Gary Forrester (born 1946), poet and novelist
- Michelanne Forster (born 1953), playwright and scriptwriter
- Dorothy Fowler (living), novelist
- Janet Frame (1924–2004), fiction writer, poet and autobiographer
- Ruth France (1913–1968), librarian, poet and novelist
- Margaret Fraser (1866–1951), domestic servant and letter writer
- Anne French (born 1956), editor and poet
- Roderick Fry (born 1969), novelist
- Catherine Fulton (1829–1919), diarist, community leader, philanthropist, social reformer and suffragette

== G ==
- Ngāreta Gabel (born 1975), children's author
- Abby Gaines (living), romance novelist
- Kathleen Gallagher (born 1957), playwright, filmmaker, poet, and novelist
- Rhian Gallagher (born 1961), poet
- Elizabeth Gard'ner (1858–1926), home science teacher and writer
- Maurice Gee (1931–2025), novelist
- Frances Shayle George (1828–1890), teacher, writer and educationalist
- James George (born 1962), novelist and short story writer
- Mīria George (born 1980), writer, producer and director
- Golriz Ghahraman (born 1981), politician and non-fiction author
- Ivy Gibbs (c. 1886–1966), poet and children's writer
- Michael Gifkins (1945–2014), literary agent, fiction writer, critic and editor
- Ruth Gilbert (1917–2016), poet
- Betty Gilderdale (1923–2021), children's author
- Olivia Aroha Giles (born 1962), novelist and children's author
- Esther Glen (1881–1940), children's novelist, journalist and community worker
- Alice Glenday (c. 1920–2004), novelist, short-story writer and playwright
- Denis Glover (1912–1980), poet and publisher
- Brannavan Gnanalingam (born 1983), author and lawyer
- Charlotte Godley (1821–1907), letter-writer and community leader
- Gaelyn Gordon (1939–1997), children's writer, crime fiction writer and short story writer
- Alfred Augustus Grace (1867–1942), teacher, journalist and writer
- Patricia Grace (born 1937), fiction and children's writer
- Grace Green (1907–1976), radio broadcaster and journalist
- Paula Green (born 1955), poet and children's author
- Lisa Greenwood (born 1955), novelist
- Stacy Gregg (born 1969), children's writer
- H. W. Gretton (1914–1983), poet, writer, journalist and diarist
- Charlotte Grimshaw (born 1966), novelist, columnist and reviewer
- Edith Searle Grossmann (1863–1931), novelist, journalist and feminist
- Kirsty Gunn (born 1960), fiction writer
- John Guthrie (1905–1955), journalist and novelist
- Peter Gossage (1946–2016), author and illustrator of Maori legends

== H ==
- Mandy Hager (born 1960), novelist, children's author, non-fiction writer and screenwriter
- David Hair (living), fantasy author
- Russell Haley (1934–2016), poet, short story writer and novelist
- Bernadette Hall (born 1945), playwright and poet
- Pip Hall (born 1971), scriptwriter and actor
- Roger Hall (born 1939), playwright
- Jane Elizabeth Harris (c. 1853–1942), writer, lecturer and spiritualist
- William Hart-Smith (1911–1990), poet
- Siobhan Harvey (born 1973), author, editor and creative writing lecturer
- J. H. Haslam (1874–1969), Methodist minister, poet, editor and church historian
- Dinah Hawken (born 1943), poet
- Kathleen Hawkins (1883–1981), poet
- Catherine Hay (1910–1995), historical romance writer
- Debbie Hay (living), molecular pharmacologist; non-fiction writer
- Karyn Hay (born 1959), author and broadcaster
- Joel Hayward (born 1964), historian, writer and poet
- Helen Heath (born 1970), poet
- Christina Henderson (1861–1953), teacher, feminist, prohibitionist, social reformer and editor
- Whiti Hereaka (born 1978), playwright, novelist and screenwriter
- Ellen Hewett (1843–1926), memoirist
- Mary St Domitille Hickey (1882–1958), Catholic nun, school principal and historian
- Sarah Higgins (1830–1923), housewife and memoirist
- David Hill (born 1942), author and young adult fiction writer
- Eva Hill (1898–1981), medical superintendent, writer, publicist and health campaigner
- Emma Hislop (living), short story writer
- Lucy Hockings (born c.1975), journalist and producer
- Dominic Hoey (born 1977), writer, poet and musician
- M. H. Holcroft (1902–1993), essayist and novelist
- Liddy Holloway (1947–2004), actress and television scriptwriter
- Jeffrey Paparoa Holman (born 1947), poet, non-fiction writer and retired academic
- Janet Holmes (born 1947), sociolinguist
- Ani Hona (1938–1997), short story writer, poet and biographer
- Lynley Hood (born 1942), biographer and non-fiction writer
- David Howard (born 1959), poet
- Philippa Howden-Chapman (fl. 2000s), academic, public health expert and non-fiction writer
- Edith Howes (1872–1954), teacher, educationalist and children's writer
- Keri Hulme (1947–2021), fiction writer and poet
- Des Hunt (born 1941), writer for children and young adults
- Janet Hunt (born 1951), non-fiction writer and children's author
- Sam Hunt (born 1946), poet especially for performance poetry
- Eirlys Hunter (born 1952), writer and creative writing teacher
- Rex Hunter (1889–1960), poet, playwright and fiction writer
- Rosalind Hursthouse (born 1943), philosopher and non-fiction writer
- Jessica Hutchings (living), non-fiction writer
- Robin Hyde (1906–1939), poet, journalist and novelist
- Prue Hyman (born 1943), academic, feminist, economist and non-fiction writer

== I ==
- Witi Ihimaera (born 1944), novelist
- Catherine Lucy Innes (c. 1840–1900), journalist
- Kevin Ireland (1933–2023), poet, short story writer, novelist and librettist
- Fanny Irvine-Smith (1878–1948), lecturer and writer
- Kate Isitt (1876–1948), journalist and writer

== J ==
- Anna Jackson (born 1967), poet, fiction and non-fiction writer and academic
- Michael Jackson (born 1940), poet and anthropologist
- Ethel Jacobson (1877–1965), newspaper editor and journalist
- Annamarie Jagose (born 1965), LGBT academic and fiction writer
- Florence James (1902–1993), writer and literary agent
- Lynn Jenner (living), poet and essayist
- Annaleese Jochems (born 1994), novelist
- Stephanie Johnson (born 1961), poet, playwright and short story writer
- Alexa Johnston (living), author, art curator and historian
- Andrew Johnston (born 1963), poet and journalist
- Christine Johnston (born 1950), novelist
- Lloyd Jones (born 1955), novelist
- Tim Jones (born 1959), fiction writer and poet
- V. M. Jones, (born 1958), children's author
- Sherryl Jordan (1949–2023), writer for children and young adults
- M. K. Joseph (1914–1981), poet and novelist

== K ==
- Keri Kaa (1942–2020), writer, educator and advocate of Māori language
- Kuni Kaa Jenkins (born 1941), writer, research and educationalist
- Simone Kaho (born 1978), poet
- Amy Kane (1879–1979), journalist and community leader
- Angelique Kasmara (living), novelist, short story writer, non-fiction writer, editor and translator
- Kapka Kassabova (born 1973), poet and writer of fiction and narrative non-fiction
- Merata Kawharu (living), writer and academic
- Sheridan Keith (born 1942), fiction writer, artist and broadcaster
- Lindy Kelly (born 1952), children's author, fiction writer and playwright
- Elizabeth Kelso (1889–1967), journalist, editor and community leader
- Jan Kemp (born 1949), poet and short-story writer
- Anne Kennedy (born 1959), novelist, poet and film writer
- Alice Annie Kenny (1875–1960), poet and fiction writer
- Eli Kent (born 1988), playwright and actor
- Angela Kepler (born 1943), naturalist and author
- Bob Kerr (born 1951), author, illustrator and artist
- Suzi Kerr (born 1966), economist, academic and non-fiction writer
- Nafanua Purcell Kersel (living), poet
- Fiona Kidman (born 1940), fiction writer, poet and scriptwriter
- Michael King (1945–2004), historian, author and biographer
- Rachael King (born 1970), fiction writer
- Russell Kirkpatrick (born 1961), geography lecturer and fantasy novelist
- Elizabeth Knox (born 1959), novelist
- Shonagh Koea (born 1939), fiction writer
- Saradha Koirala (born 1980), poet and writer

== L ==
- Sarah Laing (born 1973), author and cartoonist
- Annabel Langbein (born 1958), chef, food writer and publisher
- Eve Langley (1904–1974), novelist and poet
- Anthony Lapwood (born 1983), short story writer
- Jack Lasenby (1931–2019), writer for children and young adults
- John A. Lee (1891–1982), politician and writer
- Mary Isabella Lee (1871–1939), autobiographer
- Owen Leeming (born 1930), poet, playwright, radio presenter and television producer
- Michele Leggott (born 1956), poet and professor of English
- Colleen Maria Lenihan (living), short-story writer and screenwriter
- Louise Wareham Leonard (born 1965), novelist and poet
- Robert Leonard (born 1963), writer about contemporary art
- Christine Leunens (born 1964), novelist
- June Margaret Litman (1926–1991), journalist
- Elsie Locke (1912–2001), writer, historian and activist
- Terry Locke (born 1946), poet, anthologist, poetry reviewer and academic
- Iain Lonie (1932–1988), poet and historian
- Jean Lonie (1930–1997), poet and teacher
- Judith Lonie (1935–1982), poet
- Robert Lord (1945–1992), playwright
- Helen Lowe (born 1961), novelist
- Brigid Lowry (born 1953), writer for children and young adults
- Rose Lu (born 1990), essayist
- Edith Lyttleton (1873–1945), fiction writer

== M ==
- Claire Mabey (living), children's writer and editor
- Charlotte Macdonald (born 1950), historian
- Rebecca Macfie (born 1960/61), author and journalist
- Juliette MacIver (living), children's picture book author
- Jessie Mackay (1864–1938), poet and animal rights activist
- Katrine Mackay (1864–1944), journalist and cook
- Anna Mackenzie (born 1963), novelist
- Hester Maclean (1859–1932), hospital matron, editor and writer
- Shirley Maddock (1928–2001), producer, television presenter, author and actress
- Margaret Mahy (1936–2012), author of children's and young adult books
- Rehutai Maihi (1895–1967), journalist and newspaper publisher and editor
- Tina Makereti (living), novelist, essayist, short story writer, editor and creative writing teacher
- Emilie Monson Malcolm (c. 1830–1905), memoirist and housewife
- Clare Mallory (1913–1991), children's author and teacher
- Becky Manawatu (born 1982), novelist
- Jane Mander (1877–1949), novelist and journalist
- Bill Manhire (born 1946), poet, fiction writer and academic
- Frederick Edward Maning (1812–1883), settler, writer and Native Land Court judge
- Phillip Mann (1942–2022), science fiction author
- Katherine Mansfield (1888–1923), short-story writer and poet
- Cecil Manson (1896–1987), non-fiction writer, children's writer, journalist and broadcaster
- Celia Manson (1908–1987), non-fiction writer, children's writer, journalist and broadcaster
- Juliet Marillier (born 1948), fantasy fiction writer
- Janice Marriott (born 1946), writer, editor, screenwriter and poet
- Ngaio Marsh (1895–1982), crime writer and theatre director
- Selina Tusitala Marsh (born 1971), poet and academic
- Owen Marshall (born 1941), fiction writer
- Talia Marshall (born 1978), essay writer, poet and short-story writer
- Mary Ann Martin (1817–1884), community leader, teacher and writer
- Bruce Mason (1921–1982), playwright
- R. A. K. Mason (1905–1971), poet
- Kāterina Mataira (1932–2011), Māori language advocate, artist and writer
- Sarah Louise Mathew (c.1805–1890), diarist
- Peta Mathias (living), food writer and television presenter
- Tina Matthews (born 1961), author, illustrator and puppet maker
- Gill Matthewson (fl. 1980s), architect, educator and writer
- Muriel May (1897–1982), writer and educationalist
- Ged Maybury (born 1953), children's book author
- Cath Mayo (living), fiction writer and musician
- Rachel McAlpine (born 1940), poet, novelist and playwright
- Janet McCallum (1947–2015), non-fiction writer and journalist
- Mary McCallum (born 1961), author and journalist
- Anthony McCarten (born 1961), novelist, playwright, television writer and filmmaker
- Sue McCauley (born 1941), fiction writer, playwright and screenwriter
- Lyn McConchie (born 1946), fiction and children's writer
- Gary McCormick (born 1951), poet and broadcaster
- Carolyn McCurdie (living), fiction writer and poet
- Jill McDonald (1927–1982), children's writer and illustrator
- Kirsten McDougall (born 1974), novelist and short story writer
- Christine McElwee (1946–2022), politician, historian, non-fiction author and teacher
- Shona McFarlane (1929–2001), artist, journalist and broadcaster
- Greg McGee (born 1950), crime writer and playwright
- Rosemary McLeod (born 1949), writer, cartoonist and columnist
- Frankie McMillan (born 1950), writer of poetry, fiction and flash fiction
- Linda McNabb (born 1963), children's author
- James McNeish (1931–2016), novelist, playwright and biographer
- Heather McPherson (1942–2017), feminist poet, publisher and editor
- Cilla McQueen (born 1949), poet
- Philippa Mein Smith (living), historian
- Courtney Sina Meredith (born 1986), poet, playwright and fiction writer
- Richard Meros (born 1981), pseudonym of Murdoch Stephens, satirical author
- Elizabeth Messenger (1908–1965), journalist, cookery writer and crime novelist
- Rowan Metcalfe (1955–2003), fiction writer, poet and journalist
- Kyle Mewburn (born 1963), children's author
- Miriam Meyerhoff (born 1964), sociolinguist and non-fiction writer
- Ian Middleton (1928–2007), novelist
- O. E. Middleton (1925–2010), fiction writer
- Karlo Mila (born 1974), poet
- Barry Mitcalfe (1930–1986), poet, editor and peace activist
- David Mitchell (1940–2011), poet, teacher and cricketer
- Antonija Mitrović (fl. 1990s), computer scientist and non-fiction writer
- Tze Ming Mok (born 1978), fiction writer and socio-political commentator
- Pérrine Moncrieff (1893–1979), author, conservationist and amateur ornithologist
- Geoff Moon (1915–2009), naturalist, ornithologist, conservationist and photographer
- Kelly Ana Morey (1968–2025), novelist and poet
- Ronald Hugh Morrieson (1922–1972), fiction writer
- Paula Morris (born 1965), novelist and short-story writer
- Michael Morrissey (born 1942), poet, fiction writer and columnist
- Elsie K. Morton (1885–1968), journalist and writer
- Tamsyn Muir (born 1985), speculative fiction and horror writer
- Alan Mulgan (1881–1962), novelist, poet, journalist and broadcaster
- John Mulgan (1911–1945), novelist, poet, journalist and editor
- Jessie Munro (born 1946), writer, biographer and French teacher
- Lee Murray (born 1965), fiction writer and editor
- Shirley Murray (1931–2020), writer of hymn texts
- Margaret Mutu (living), Ngāti Kahu leader, author and academic

== N ==
- Elizabeth Nannestad (born 1956), poet
- Susan Napier (born 1954), romance writer
- Sheila Natusch (1926–2017), writer, naturalist and illustrator
- Emma Neale (born 1969), novelist and poet
- Lino Nelisi (born 1952), author and educator
- Janet Newman (living), poet and journalist
- John Newton (born 1959), poet
- Marjory Nicholls (1890–1930), poet, teacher and drama producer
- Jay Nieuwland (born 1990), poet
- Carl Nixon (born 1967), fiction writer and playwright
- Mikaela Nyman (born 1966), novelist, poet and journalist

== O ==
- Susan Moller Okin (1946–2004), feminist political philosopher and author
- Peter Olds (1944–2023), poet
- Michael O'Leary (born 1950), publisher, poet and novelist
- Gloria Olive (1923–2006), academic mathematician and author
- W. H. Oliver (1925–2015), historian and poet
- Linda Olsson (born 1948), novelist
- Claudia Orange (born 1938), historian
- Margaret Orbell (1935–2006), author, editor and academic
- Sue Orr (born 1962), fiction writer and journalist
- Joanna Orwin (born 1944), fiction and non-fiction writer for adults and children

== P ==
- Mākereti Papakura (1873–1930), guide, entertainer and ethnographer
- Ruth Park (1917–2010), novelist and children's, non-fiction and radio writer
- H. G. Parry (living), fantasy novelist and short story writer
- Lorae Parry (born 1955), playwright and actor
- Lawrence Patchett (living), novelist and short story writer
- Alistair Paterson (born 1929), poet, writer and literary editor
- Justin Paton (born 1972), writer, art critic and curator
- Jenny Pattrick (born 1936), novelist
- Evelyn Patuawa-Nathan (1933–2019), poet and novelist
- Isabel Peacocke (1881–1973), teacher, novelist and broadcaster
- Helen Pearse-Otene (living), playwright, screenwriter and novelist
- Bill Pearson (1922–2002), fiction writer, essayist and critic
- Neville Peat (born 1947), novelist and non-fiction writer
- Nicky Pellegrino (born 1964), novelist
- Emily Perkins (born 1970), fiction writer
- Dianne Ruth Pettis (1955–2008), novelist and journalist
- April Phillips (born 1965), actress, playwright and singer
- Leonie Pihama (born 1962), Māori academic
- Mark Pirie (born 1974), poet, writer, critic and anthologist
- Vivienne Plumb (born 1955), poet, playwright, fiction writer and editor
- Robert J. Pope (1865–1949), poet and songwriter
- Michele Powles (born 1976), novelist, playwright, and non-fiction writer
- Nina Mingya Powles (born 1993), poet and essayist
- Joanna Preston (born 1972), poet and editor
- Chris Price (born 1962), poet, editor and creative writing teacher
- Rebecca Priestley (living), academic, science historian and writer
- Erenora Puketapu-Hetet (1941–2006), weaver and author
- Elizabeth Pulford (born 1943), writer of fiction, poetry and non-fiction

== Q ==
- Alison Quigan (born 1952), actress, director and playwright
- Sarah Quigley (living), fiction writer and poet

== R ==
- Maggie Rainey-Smith (born 1950), novelist, poet, short story writer, essayist and reviewer
- Maraea Rakuraku (living), playwright, poet, short story writer, and broadcaster
- essa may ranapiri (born 1993/4), poet and visual artist
- Charlotte Randall (living), novelist
- Beverley Randell (born 1931), children's author
- Jo Randerson (born 1973), writer, director and performer
- Max Rashbrooke (born 1980), journalist, political writer and researcher
- Lizzie Rattray (1855–1931), journalist, suffragist and welfare worker
- Gloria Rawlinson (1918–1995), poet, fiction writer and editor
- Annie Lee Rees (1864–1949), writer, teacher, lawyer and community leader
- Rosemary Frances Rees (c.1875–1963), actress, playwright, producer and novelist
- Amber Reeves (1887–1981), feminist, writer and scholar
- William Pember Reeves (1857–1932), politician, cricketer, historian and poet
- Sue Reidy (living), author and designer
- Rebecca K Reilly (born 1991), novelist
- Paddy Richardson (living), fiction writer
- Mary Richmond (1853–1949), community leader, teacher and writer
- Harry Ricketts (born 1950), poet, biographer, editor, anthologist, critic, academic, literary scholar and cricket writer
- Catherine Robertson (born 1966), novelist
- Roger Robinson (born 1939), academic, essayist, editor, runner, sportswriter and sports commentator
- Lauren Kim Roche (born 1961), author and physician
- Violet Augusta Roche (1885–1967), journalist and welfare worker
- Hilda Rollett (1873–1970), teacher, journalist and writer
- Joan Rosier-Jones (born 1940), fiction and non-fiction writer and playwright
- Tania Roxborogh (born 1965), novelist and non-fiction writer

== S ==
- Fiona Samuel (born 1961), playwright, actor and director
- Maria Samuela (born 1972), short story and children's writer
- Ben Sanders (born 1989), crime writer
- Nora Sanderson (1905–1975), romance novelist, children's book writer and short-story writer
- Elspeth Sandys (born 1940), fiction writer and poet
- Frank Sargeson (1903–1982), fiction novelist
- Duncan Sarkies (living), screenwriter, playwright and fiction writer
- Nelle Scanlan (1882–1968), journalist and novelist
- Ben Schrader (1964–2024), historian
- Dick Scott (1923–2020), historian and journalist
- Margaret Scott (1928–2014), writer, editor, librarian and Katherine Mansfield scholar
- Mary Scott (1888–1979), novelist and librarian
- Mary-anne Scott (living), writer, singer and musician
- Robyn Scott (born 1981), writer and entrepreneur
- Rosie Scott (1948–2017), novelist, poet, playwright, short-story writer, non-fiction writer, editor and lecturer
- William Sewell (1951–2003), poet, book reviewer and editor
- Maurice Shadbolt (1932–2004), fiction writer, autobiographer and playwright
- Iain Sharp (born 1953), poet and critic
- Helen Lilian Shaw (1913–1985), short-story writer, poet and editor
- Tina Shaw (born 1961), novelist
- Adrienne Simpson (1943–2010), broadcaster, historian, musicologist and writer
- Keith Sinclair (1922–1993), poet and historian
- Nalini Singh (born 1977), paranormal romance novelist
- Tracey Slaughter (born 1972), poet and short-story writer
- Anna Smaill (born 1979), poet and novelist
- Craig Smith (living), children's author
- Elizabeth Smither (born 1941), poet and novelist
- Kendrick Smithyman (1922–1995), poet
- Ruby Solly (born 1996), poet, academic and scriptwriter
- Laura Solomon (1974–2019), novelist, playwright and poet
- Eileen Louise Soper (1900–1989), journalist, writer and Girl Guide Commissioner
- C. K. Stead (born 1932), fiction writer, poet and literary critic
- Māmari Stephens (born 1970), legal academic
- Murdoch Stephens (born 1981), novelist
- Adela Blanche Stewart (1846–1910), housewife and non-fiction writer
- Olga Stringfellow (1923–?), journalist and novelist
- Jacquie Sturm (1927–2009), poet, short story writer and librarian
- Terry Sturm (1941–2009), editor and academic
- Laura Jane Suisted (1840–1903), writer, journalist and parliamentary reporter
- Robert Sullivan (born 1967), poet, academic and editor
- Essie Summers (1912–1998), romance novelist
- Barbara Sumner (living), writer and film producer
- Fiona Sussman (born 1965), novelist and short story writer
- Vanda Symon (born 1969), crime writer and radio host
- Melinda Szymanik (born 1963), children's author

== T ==
- Tusi Tamasese (born 1975/6), scriptwriter
- Leilani Tamu (living), poet and politician
- Lilia Tarawa, former member of Gloriavale Christian Community, author, speaker, entrepreneur
- Violet Targuse (1884–1937), playwright
- Anna Taylor (born 1982), short-story writer
- Apirana Taylor (born 1955), poet, novelist, performer, story-teller, musician and painter
- Chad Taylor (born 1964), fiction writer and screenwriter
- Grace Taylor (born c.1984), poet and performer
- Renée Taylor (1929–2023), feminist writer and playwright
- Ngāhuia Te Awekōtuku (born 1949), Māori cultural academic and non-fiction writer
- Samuel Te Kani (born 1990), essayist, short-story writer and poet
- Philip Temple (born 1939), novelist, children's author and non-fiction author
- Margaret Tennant (living), historian
- Brianne Te Paa (born 1984), children's author
- Ngaire Thomas (1943–2012), memoirist
- Kirsten Moana Thompson (born 1964), academic and film writer
- Mervyn Thompson (1935–1992), academic, playwright and theatre director
- Tayi Tibble (born 1995), poet
- Ariana Tikao (born 1971), non-fiction writer, musician and research librarian
- Mona Tracy (1892–1959), children's novelist, journalist, poet and fiction writer
- Jill Trevelyan (born 1963), art curator, reviewer and author
- Chris Tse (born 1982), poet and writer
- Brian Turner (1944–2025), poet, sportsman and journalist
- Hone Tuwhare (1922–2008), poet

== U ==
- Makerita Urale (fl. 1990s), playwright, producer and documentary director

== V ==
- Kathryn van Beek (born 1980/1981), short story writer, playwright, children's writer and illustrator
- Julius Vogel (1835–1899), politician and science-fiction novelist

== W ==
- Arnold Wall (1869–1966), poet, academic, mountaineer, botanist, writer and radio broadcaster
- Dorothy Wall (1894–1942), children's author and illustrator
- Louise Wallace (born 1983), poet
- Alan Ward (1935–2014), historian and writer
- Gareth Ward (living), magician, hypnotist, storyteller, bookseller and writer
- Marilyn Waring (born 1952), politician and academic in feminist economics
- Kirsten Warner (born 1956), novelist, poet and journalist
- Enga Washbourn (1908–1988), non-fiction writer
- Joy Watson (1938–2021), children's author
- Richard James Waugh (born 1957), minister, historian, aviation chaplain and writer
- Ian Wedde (born 1946), poet, fiction writer and critic
- Emma Wehipeihana (born 1983/4), journalist and memoirist
- Peter Wells (1950–2019), writer, filmmaker and historian
- Albert Wendt (born 1939), poet, novelist and academic
- Joyce West (1908–1985), novelist and children's writer
- Jessie Weston (1865–1939), novelist and journalist
- Tom Weston (born 1958), poet
- Philippa Werry (born 1958), writer
- Lydia Wevers (1950–2021), critic, historian and editor
- Mere Whaanga (born 1952), author and historian
- Reina Whaitiri (born 1943), scholar, essayist and poet
- Dorothy Neal White (1915–1995), librarian and writer
- Annabelle White (living), food writer
- Mabel Whitaker (1884–1976), teacher, local historian
- Emily White (1839–1936), gardener and writer
- Cherry Wilder (1930–2002), science fiction and fantasy writer
- Damien Wilkins (born 1963), fiction writer and poet
- Mark Williams (born 1951), poet, writer, academic, critic and editor
- Mona Williams (born 1943), children's author, memoirist, oral storyteller and writing teacher
- Guthrie Wilson (1914–1984), novelist and educator
- Helen Wilson (1869–1957), teacher, farmer, community leader and writer
- Vernice Wineera (1938–2024), poet, editor and educator
- Nicola Winstanley, children's book and short story writer
- Iona Winter (living), poet, short fiction writer and editor
- Alison Wong (born 1960), poet and novelist
- Elizabeth Wong (living) retired official and fiction writer
- Susan Wood (1836–1880), poet and short-story writer
- Alice Woodhouse (1883–1977), librarian, journalist and broadcaster
- Mary Woodward (1928–2004), non-fiction writer
- Sue Wootton (born 1961), poet and fiction writer
- Anne Eyre Worboys (1920–2007), romance and suspense novelist
- Niel Wright (1933–2024), poet, literary critic, bibliographer and publisher

== Y ==
- Sonja Yelich (born 1965), poet
- Ashleigh Young (born 1983), poet, essayist, editor and creative writing teacher

== See also ==
- New Zealand literature
- List of New Zealand poets
- List of New Zealand women writers
