= List of New Zealand women writers =

This is a list of women writers who were born in New Zealand or whose lives and works are closely associated with that country.

== A ==
- Michèle A'Court (born 1961), comedian, memoirist and non-fiction writer
- Avis Acres (1910–1994), artist, writer, illustrator and conservationist
- Pip Adam, novelist, short story writer, and reviewer
- Catherine Adamson (1868–1925), diarist
- Fleur Adcock (1934–2024), poet and editor
- Pinky Agnew (born 1955), actor, author and social commentator
- Sarona Aiono-Iosefa (born 1962), children's fiction writer
- Vanessa Alexander, screenwriter, producer, director
- Margaret Alington (1920–2012), librarian, historian and writer
- Rosetta Allan (living), poet and novelist
- Pamela Allen (born 1934), children's writer and illustrator
- Michele Amas (1961–2016), poet, playwright and actress
- Barbara Anderson (1926–2013), novelist, short story writer
- Mona Anderson (1909–2004), memoirist, children's writer
- Isobel Andrews (1905–1990), playwright, poet, short story writer and novelist
- Michalia Arathimos (living), short story writer and novelist
- Jane Arthur (born 1981), poet, children's writer, bookseller and editor
- Sylvia Ashton-Warner (1908–1984), writer, poet and educator
- Tusiata Avia (born 1966), poet, children's writer

== B ==
- Annette Baier (1929–2012), philosopher and non-fiction writer
- Hinemoana Baker (born 1968), poet, teacher
- Louisa Alice Baker (1856–1926), journalist and novelist
- Philippa Ballantine (born 1971), novelist
- Serie Barford (fl. 2007), poet, short story writer
- Mary Anne Barker (1831–1911), journalist, poet and writer
- Miriam Barr (born 1982), poet
- Sarah Maria Barraud (c.1823–1895), letter writer
- Rachel Barrowman (born 1963), author and historian
- Amelia Batistich (1915–2004), novelist, short story writer and memoirist
- Blanche Edith Baughan (1870–1958), poet, writer and penal reformer
- Ann Beaglehole (born 1948), historian and novelist
- Helen Beaglehole (born 1946), children's writer and historian
- Fleur Beale (born 1945), teenage fiction writer
- Margaret Beames (1935–2016), children's writer
- Airini Beautrais (born 1982), poet
- Marlene J Bennetts (born 1938), poet and children's author
- Jeanne Bernhardt (born 1961), poet, novelist and short story writer
- Ursula Bethell (1874–1945), poet and social worker
- Jean Betts (fl. 1970s), playwright
- Judith Binney (1940–2011), historian, academic and writer
- Hera Lindsay Bird (born 1987), poet
- Ellen Blackwell (1864–1952), writer and botanist
- Arapera Blank (1932–2002), poet and teacher
- Paula Boock (born 1964), writer and editor
- Jenny Bornholdt (born 1960), poet and children's writer
- Avice Maud Bowbyes (1901–1992), home science lecturer and writer
- Virginia Braun (fl. 2000s), gender studies expert, psychologist and non-fiction writer
- Freda Bream (1918–1996), teacher, novelist and non-fiction writer
- Diana Bridge (born 1942), poet
- Bub Bridger (1924–2009), poet and short story writer
- Adele Broadbent (born 1968), children's author
- Deidre Brown (born 1970), historian
- Diane Brown (born 1951), novelist and poet
- Helen Brown (born 1954), novelist and columnist
- Riwia Brown (born 1957), playwright
- Audrey Brown-Pereira (born 1975), poet, diplomat and public servant
- Harriet Louisa Browne (1829–1906), salon hostess, community leader and letter writer
- Rachel Buchanan (born 1968), author and historian
- Margaret Bullock (1845–1903), journalist, writer, feminist and reformer
- Norah Burnard (1902–1979), journal editor
- Rachel Bush (1941–2016), poet
- Dorothy Butler (1925–2015), children's writer, bookseller and memoirist

== C ==
- Dolce Ann Cabot (1862–1943), journalist, newspaper editor, feminist and teacher
- Octavia Cade (living), climate fiction novelist
- Judy Callingham (living), scriptwriter, television presenter and journalist
- Kirsty Cameron (living), screenwriter
- Kate Camp (born 1972) poet and essayist
- Meg Campbell (1937–2007), poet
- Sarah Campion (1906–2002), pseudonym of Mary Rose Alpers, novelist and social activist
- Gillian Candler (born 1959), writer, teacher, publisher and conservationist
- Una Carter (1890–1954), cookbook writer
- Christine Cole Catley (1922–2011), journalist, publisher and writer
- Eleanor Catton (born 1985), novelist and short story writer
- Frances Caverhill (1834–1897), diarist
- Lynda Chanwai-Earle (born 1966), poet, playwright and actress
- Janet Charman (born 1954) poet
- Brenda Chawner (fl. 2010s), library academic, editor and writer
- Frances Cherry (1937–2022), novelist, short story writer and children's writer
- Catherine Chidgey (born 1970), novelist and short story writer
- Daphne Clair (born 1939), romance novelist
- Kate Clark (1847–1926), children's writer, poet, artist and community worker
- Margaret Clark (born 1941), academic, editor and non-fiction writer
- Constance Clyde (1872–1951), journalist, essayist and writer
- Nellie Euphemia Coad (1883–1974), teacher, community leader and writer
- Gina Cole (born 1960), lawyer, short story writer and novelist
- Elizabeth Fairburn Colenso (1821–1904), missionary, teacher and Bible translator
- Jennifer Compton (born 1949), playwright, poet and short story writer
- Sandra Coney (born 1944), politician, feminist, historian and non-fiction writer
- Kay McKenzie Cooke (born 1953), poet
- Sue Copsey (born 1960), children's author and editor
- Judy Corbalis (fl. 1980s), novelist and short story wrilter
- Violet May Cottrell (1887–1971), poet and spiritualist
- Joy Cowley (born 1936), children's writer
- Rachael Craw, young adult writer
- Mary Cresswell (born 1937), science editor and poet
- Fiona Cross (fl. 2000s), arachnologist and non-fiction writer
- Majella Cullinane, poet and novelist
- Jackie Cumming (fl. 2000s), academic, health expert and non-fiction writer

== D ==
- Lois Daish (fl. 1960s), restaurateur, cookbook writer
- Debra Daley, novelist
- Ruth Dallas (1919–2008), poet and children's writer
- Lynn Davidson (born 1959), novelist, poet and memoirist
- Winnie Davin (1909–1995), teacher, community worker, writer and editor
- Jackie Davis (born 1963), novelist and poet
- Kate De Goldi (born 1959), novelist, children's writer and short story writer
- Joan de Hamel (1924–2011), children's writer
- Stephanie de Montalk (born 1945), poet and biographer
- Elena de Roo (living), poet and children's author
- Pip Desmond, non-fiction author and journalist
- Jean Devanny (1894–1962), novelist and short story writer
- Gillian Dobbie (fl. 2000s), computer scientist, academic and non-fiction writer
- Lynley Dodd (born 1941), children's writer
- Robyn Donald (born 1940), novelist
- Melanie Drewery (born 1970), children's author and illustrator
- Joan Druett (born 1939), historical novelist and non-fiction writer
- Alison Drummond (1903–1984), farmer, historian, writer and editor
- Marilyn Duckworth (born 1935), novelist, poet and short story writer
- Tessa Duder (born 1940), swimmer, young adult writer and non-fiction writer
- Yvonne du Fresne (1929–2011), short story writer, playwright and novelist
- Eileen Duggan (1894–1972), poet and journalist
- Kate Duignan (born 1974), novelist
- Beverley Dunlop (1935–2023), children's writer, novelist and short story writer
- Cathie Dunsford (born 1953), novelist, poet and anthologist
- Hedda Dyson (1857–1951), journalist and magazine editor

== E ==
- Elisabeth Easther (born 1970), journalist and playwright
- Dorothy Eden (1912–1982), novelist and short story writer
- Lynley Edmeades (living), poet, academic and editor
- Lauris Edmond (1924–2000), poet
- Mihi Edwards (1918–2008), memoirist
- Jill Eggleton (living), children's book author, teacher and education consultant
- Ellen Elizabeth Ellis (1829–1895), feminist and writer
- Barbara Else (born 1947), novelist, short story writer, editor and literary agent
- Bronwyn Elsmore (living), fiction and non-fiction writer and playwright
- Riemke Ensing (born 1939), poet and educator
- Margaret Escott (1908–1977), novelist, drama teacher and poet
- Barbara Ewing (born 1939), actress and writer

== F ==
- Jacqueline Fahey (born 1929), painter and writer
- Tracy Farr (born 1962), novelist and short story writer
- Fiona Farrell (born 1947), poet, novelist, short story writer and playwright
- Angie Farrow (born 1951), academic, playwright and writer for theatre and radio
- Laurence Fearnley (born 1963), short-story writer, novelist and non-fiction writer
- Gigi Fenster (born 1963/64), author, creative writing teacher and law lecturer
- Joan Fleming (born 1984), poet, non-fiction writer and academic
- Beryl Fletcher (1938–2018), novelist
- Tui Flower (1925–2017), food writer
- Mihingarangi Forbes (fl. 1990s), journalist and radio broadcaster
- Margot Forde (1935–1995), botanist, taxonomist and writer
- Michelanne Forster (born 1953), playwright and scriptwriter
- Dorothy Fowler (fl. 2009), novelist
- Janet Frame (1924–2004), novelist, poet, short story writer and children's writer
- Ruth France (1913–1968), librarian, poet and novelist
- Margaret Fraser (1866–1951), domestic servant and letter writer
- Anne French (born 1956), poet and editor
- Catherine Fulton (1829–1919), diarist, social reformer and suffragette

== G ==
- Ngāreta Gabel (born 1975), children's author
- Abby Gaines (fl. 2007), romance novelist
- Kathleen Gallagher (born 1957), playwright, filmmaker, poet, and novelist
- Rhian Gallagher (born 1961), poet
- Elizabeth Gard'ner (1858–1926), home science teacher and writer
- Frances Shayle George (c.1829–1890), teacher, writer
- Mīria George (born 1980), writer, producer and director
- Golriz Ghahraman (born 1981), politician and non-fiction author
- Ivy Gibbs (c. 1886–1966), poet and children's writer
- Ruth Gilbert (1917–2016), poet
- Betty Gilderdale (1923–2021), children's book author
- Olivia Aroha Giles (fl. 2006), artist and writer
- Esther Glen (1881–1940), novelist, children's writer, journalist and community worker
- Alice Glenday (c. 1920–2004), novelist, short-story writer and playwright
- Charlotte Godley (1821–1907), letter writer and community leader
- Gaelyn Gordon (1939–1997), children's writer, crime fiction writer and short story writer
- Patricia Grace (born 1937), novelist, short-story writer, and children's author
- Grace Winifred Green (1907–1976), radio broadcaster and journalist
- Paula Green (born 1955) poet and children's author
- Lisa Greenwood (born 1955), novelist
- Stacy Gregg (born 1968), children's writer
- Charlotte Grimshaw (born 1966), novelist
- Edith Searle Grossmann (1863–1931), teacher, novelist, journalist and feminist
- Kirsty Gunn (born 1960), novelist and short-story writer

== H ==
- Mandy Hager (born 1960), novelist, young adult writer
- Bernadette Hall (born 1945), poet and editor
- Pip Hall (born 1971), playwright and scriptwriter
- Jane Elizabeth Harris (c.1853–1942), writer, lecturer and spiritualist
- Siobhan Harvey (born 1973), author, editor and creative writing lecturer
- Dinah Hawken (born 1943), poet
- Kathleen Hawkins (1883–1981), poet
- Catherine Hay (1910–1995), romance novelist
- Debbie Hay, molecular pharmacologist; non-fiction writer
- Karyn Hay (born 1959), writer, broadcaster
- Helen Heath (born 1970), poet
- Christina Henderson (1861–1953), teacher, feminist, prohibitionist, social reformer and editor
- Whiti Hereaka (born 1978), playwright, novelist and screenwriter
- Ellen Hewett (1843–1926), writer
- Mary St Domitille Hickey (1882–1958), nun, historian
- Sarah Higgins (1830–1923), midwife, community leader and writer
- Eva Hill (1898–1981), physician, writer and health campaigner
- Emma Hislop (living), short story writer
- Lucy Hockings (born c.1975), journalist and producer
- Liddy Holloway (1947–2004), actress and television scriptwriter
- Janet Holmes (born 1947), linguist, sociologist and non-fiction writer
- Ani Hona (1938–1997), short story writer, poet and biographer
- Lynley Hood (born 1942), biographer and non-fiction writer
- Philippa Howden-Chapman (fl. 2000s), academic, public health expert and non-fiction writer
- Edith Howes (1872–1954), teacher, writer and educationalist
- Keri Hulme (1947–2021), novelist and poet
- Janet Hunt (born 1951), non-fiction writer and children's author
- Eirlys Hunter (born 1952), writer and creative writing teacher
- Rosalind Hursthouse (born 1943), philosopher and non-fiction writer
- Jessica Hutchings (living), non-fiction writer
- Robin Hyde (1906–1939), poet and novelist
- Prue Hyman (born 1943), academic, feminist, economist and non-fiction writer

== I ==
- Catherine Lucy Innes (c.1840–1900), writer
- Fanny Irvine-Smith (1878–1948), teacher, lecturer and writer
- Kate Isitt (1876–1948), journalist and writer

== J ==
- Anna Jackson (born 1967), poet, fiction and non-fiction writer and academic
- Ethel Jacobson (1877–1965), newspaper editor and journalist
- Annamarie Jagose (born 1965), LGBT academic and novelist
- Florence James (1902–1993), writer and literary agent
- Lynn Jenner, poet and essayist
- Annaleese Jochems (born 1994), novelist
- Stephanie Johnson (born 1961), poet, playwright, and short story writer
- Alexa Johnston, biographer and food writer
- Christine Johnston (born 1950) novelist
- V. M. Jones (born 1958), children's writer
- Sherryl Jordan (1949–2023), children's writer

== K ==
- Keri Kaa (1942–2020), Māori language advocate, writer and educator
- Simone Kaho (born 1978), poet
- Angelique Kasmara (living), novelist, short story writer, non-fiction writer, editor and translator
- Kapka Kassabova (born 1973), poet and writer of fiction and narrative non-fiction
- Amy Kane (1879–1979), journalist and community leader
- Merata Kawharu (fl. 1990s), writer and academic
- Sheridan Keith (born 1942), novelist, short-story writer, artist, broadcaster and curator
- Lindy Kelly (born 1952), short-story writer, children's writer, playwright and novelist
- Elizabeth Kelso (1889–1967), journalist, editor and community leader
- Jan Kemp (born 1949), poet and short-story writer
- Anne Kennedy (born 1959), novelist, poet and filmwriter
- Alice Annie Kenny (1875–1960), short-story writer and novelist
- Angela Kepler (born 1943), naturalist and writer
- Suzi Kerr (born 1966), economist, academic and non-fiction writer
- Nafanua Purcell Kersel (living), poet
- Fiona Kidman (born 1940), novelist, poet, scriptwriter and short-story writer
- Rachael King (born 1970), novelist and short-story writer
- Elizabeth Knox (born 1959), novelist, autobiographical novella writer and essayist
- Shonagh Koea (born 1939), novelist, short-story writer
- Saradha Koirala (born 1980), poet, writer and novelist

== L ==
- Sarah Laing (born 1973), author and cartoonist
- Annabel Langbein (born 1958), cook, food writer and publisher
- Eve Langley (1904–1974), novelist and poet
- Mary Isabella Lee (1871–1939), autobiographer
- Michele Leggott (born 1956), poet and academic
- Colleen Maria Lenihan (living), short-story writer and screenwriter
- Louise Wareham Leonard (born 1965), novelist and poet
- Christine Leunens (born 1964), novelist
- June Margaret Litman (1926–1991), journalist
- Elsie Locke (1912–2001), poet, novelist, children's writer, non-fiction writer and feminist
- Jean Lonie (1930–1997), poet and teacher
- Judith Lonie (1935–1982), poet
- Helen Lowe (born 1961), novelist
- Brigid Lowry (born 1953), children's and young adult author
- Rose Lu (born 1990), non-fiction writer
- Edith Joan Lyttleton (1873–1945), novelist and short story writer

== M ==
- Claire Mabey (living), children's writer and editor
- Charlotte Macdonald (born 1950), historian and non-fiction writer
- Rebecca Macfie (born 1960/61), non-fiction author and journalist
- Juliette MacIver (living), children's picture book author
- Jessie Mackay (1864–1938), poet
- Katrine Mackay (1864–1944), journalist and cook
- Anna Mackenzie (born 1963), children's and young adult writer
- Hester Maclean (1859–1932), nurse, matron and autobiographer
- Shirley Maddock (1928–2001), producer, television presenter, author and actress
- Margaret Mahy (1936–2012), children's and young adult writer
- Rehutai Maihi (1895–1967), journalist and newspaper publisher and editor
- Tina Makereti (living), novelist, essayist, and short story writer, editor and creative writing teacher
- Emilie Monson Malcolm (c.1830–1905), writer
- Clare Mallory (1913–1991), children's writer
- Becky Manawatu (born 1982), novelist
- Jane Mander (1877–1949), novelist and journalist
- Katherine Mansfield (1888–1923), modernist and short story writer
- Celia Manson (1908–1987), non-fiction writer, children's writer, journalist and broadcaster
- Juliet Marillier (born 1948), novelist
- Janice Marriott (born 1946), children's writer, screenwriter and poet
- Ngaio Marsh (1895–1982), crime writer
- Selina Tusitala Marsh (born 1971), poet
- Talia Marshall (born 1978), essay writer, poet and short-story writer
- Mary Ann Martin (1817–1884), community leader, teacher and writer
- Kāterina Mataira (1932–2011), Māori language proponent, educator, intellectual, artist and writer
- Sarah Louise Mathew (c.1805–1890), diarist
- Peta Mathias (fl. 1990s), food writer and television presenter
- Tina Matthews (born 1961), children's writer, illustrator
- Gill Matthewson (fl. 1980s), architect, educator and writer
- Muriel Wallace May (1897–1982), teacher, school principal and writer
- Cath Mayo, children's, young adults' and adult novelist
- Rachel McAlpine (born 1940), poet, playwright, novelist and non-fiction writer
- Janet McCallum (1947–2015), non-fiction writer and journalist
- Mary McCallum (born 1961), poet, novelist, children's author, songwriter, editor and publisher
- Sue McCauley (born 1941), novelist, short story writer, playwright, journalist and screenwriter
- Lyn McConchie (born 1946), novelist and children's writer
- Carolyn McCurdie poet, children's and short story writer
- Jill McDonald (1927–1982), children's writer and illustrator
- Kirsten McDougall (born 1974), novelist and short story writer
- Christine McElwee (1946–2022), politician, historian, non-fiction author and teacher
- Shona McFarlane (1929–2001), artist, journalist and broadcaster
- Rosemary McLeod (born 1949), writer, journalist and cartoonist
- Frankie McMillan (born 1950), writer of poetry, fiction and flash fiction
- Linda McNabb (born 1963), children's writer
- Heather McPherson (1942–2017), feminist poet, publisher and editor
- Cilla McQueen (born 1949), poet
- Philippa Mein Smith (living), historian
- Courtney Sina Meredith (born 1986), poet, playwright, and short story author
- Elizabeth Messenger (1908–1965), journalist, cookery writer and crime novelist
- Rowan Metcalfe (1955–2003), novelist, short-story writer, poet, editor and journalist
- Miriam Meyerhoff (born 1964), sociolinguist and non-fiction writer
- Karlo Mila (born 1974), poet
- Antonija Mitrović (fl. 1990s), computer scientist and non-fiction writer
- Tze Ming Mok (born 1978), fiction writer and sociopolitical commentator
- Tapu Misa (fl. 2010s), journalist
- Pérrine Moncrieff (1883–1979), writer and conservationist
- Kelly Ana Morey (1968–2025), novelist and poet
- Paula Morris (born 1965), novelist and short story writer
- Elsie K. Morton (1885–1968), journalist and writer
- Tamsyn Muir (born 1985), fantasy and science fiction novelist
- Jessie Munro (born 1946), writer, biographer and French teacher
- Shirley Murray (1931–2020), hymn writer
- Margaret Mutu (fl. 2000s), activist and writer

== N ==
- Elizabeth Nannestad (born 1956), poet
- Susan Napier (born 1954), romance novelist
- Sheila Natusch (1926–2017), writer and illustrator
- Emma Neale (born 1969), novelist and poet
- Lino Nelisi (born 1952), children's author
- Janet Newman (living), poet and journalist
- Marjory Nicholls (1890–1930), poet, teacher and drama producer
- Jay Nieuwland (born 1990), poet
- Mikaela Nyman (born 1966), novelist, poet and journalist

== O ==
- Susan Moller Okin (1946–2004), philosopher and non-fiction writer
- Gloria Olive (1923–2006), mathematician and non-fiction writer
- Linda Olsson (born 1948), novelist
- Claudia Orange (born 1938), historian and non-fiction writer
- Margaret Orbell (1935–2006), author, editor and academic
- Sue Orr (born 1962), short story writer and novelist
- Joanna Orwin (born 1944), fiction and non-fiction writer for adults and children

== P ==
- Makereti Papakura (1873–1930), entertainer and ethnographer
- Ruth Park (1917–2010), novelist, short story writer and children's writer
- H. G. Parry (living), fantasy novelist and short story writer
- Lorae Parry (fl. 1990s), playwright
- Jenny Pattrick (born 1936), novelist
- Evelyn Patuawa-Nathan (1933–2019), writer
- Isabel Peacocke (1881–1973), teacher, novelist and broadcaster
- Helen Pearse-Otene (living), playwright, screenwriter and novelist
- Nicky Pellegrino (born 1964), novelist
- Emily Perkins (born 1970), novelist
- Dianne Ruth Pettis (1955–2008), novelist and journalist
- April Phillips (born 1965), actress, writer, singer and film producer
- Leonie Pihama (born 1962), researcher, academic and non-fiction writer
- Vivienne Plumb (born 1955), poet, playwright, novelist and editor
- Michele Powles (born 1976), novelist, playwright, and non-fiction writer
- Nina Mingya Powles (born 1993), poet and essayist
- Joanna Preston (born 1972), poet and editor
- Chris Price (born 1962), poet, editor and creative writing teacher
- Rebecca Priestley (fl. 1990s), academic, science historian and non-fiction writer
- Erenora Puketapu-Hetet (1941–2006), weaver and writer
- Elizabeth Pulford (born 1943), writer of fiction, poetry and non-fiction for children, teenagers and adults

== Q ==
- Alison Quigan (born 1952), actress, theatre director and playwright
- Sarah Quigley (living), fiction writer and poet

== R ==
- Maggie Rainey-Smith (born 1950), novelist, poet, short story writer, essayist and reviewer
- Maraea Rakuraku (living), playwright, poet, short story writer, and broadcaster
- Charlotte Randall (fl. 1990s), novelist
- Beverley Randell (born 1931), children's writer
- Jo Randerson (born 1973), writer, playwright and actress
- Lizzie Rattray (1855–1931), journalist, suffragist and welfare worker
- Gloria Rawlinson (1918–1995), poet, novelist, short story writer and editor
- Annie Lee Rees (1849–1949), writer, teacher, lawyer and community leader
- Rosemary Frances Rees (1875–1963), actress, theatre producer and novelist
- Amber Reeves (1887–1981), feminist, writer and scholar
- Sue Reidy, author and designer
- Rebecca K Reilly (born 1991), novelist
- Paddy Richardson (fl. 2000), novelist and short story writer
- Mary Richmond (1853–1949), community leader, teacher and writer
- Catherine Robertson (born 1966), novelist
- Violet Augusta Roche (1885–1967), journalist and welfare worker
- Hilda Rollett (1873–1970), teacher, journalist and writer
- Joan Rosier-Jones (born 1940), novelist, playwright, short story writer, non-fiction writer and teacher
- Tania Roxborogh (born 1965), teacher, novelist and non-fiction writer

== S ==
- Fiona Samuel (born 1961), playwright, writer, actress and director
- Maria Samuela (born 1972), short story and children's writer
- Nora Sanderson (1905–1975), romance novelist, children's book writer and short-story writer
- Elspeth Sandys (born 1940), novelist, poet, and short story author
- Nelle Scanlan (1882–1968), journalist and novelist
- Margaret Scott (1928–2014), writer, editor, librarian and Katherine Mansfield scholar
- Mary Scott (1888–1979), teacher and novelist
- Mary-anne Scott, writer and musician
- Robyn Scott (born 1981), writer and entrepreneur
- Rosie Scott (1948–2017), novelist and lecturer
- Helen Lilian Shaw (1913–1985), short story writer, poet and editor
- Tina Shaw (born 1961), novelist and children's writer
- Tracey Slaughter (born 1972), poet and short-story writer
- Adrienne Simpson (1943–2010), broadcaster, historian, musicologist and writer
- Nalini Singh (born 1977), romance novelist
- Anna Smaill (born 1979), poet and novelist
- Elizabeth Smither (born 1941), poet and novelist
- Ruby Solly (born 1996), poet, academic and scriptwriter
- Laura Solomon (1974–2019), novelist, playwright and poet
- Eileen Louise Soper (1900–1989), journalist and Girl Guide commissioner
- Māmari Stephens (born 1970), legal academic, lexicographer and non-fiction writer
- Adela Blanche Stewart (1846–1910), homemaker and writer
- Olga Stringfellow (1923–?), journalist and novelist
- Jacquie Sturm (1927–2009), poet and short story writer
- Laura Jane Suisted (1840–1903), writer, journalist and parliamentary reporter
- Essie Summers (1912–1998), romance novelist
- Barbara Sumner (born 1960), film producer and writer
- Fiona Sussman (born 1965), novelist and short story writer
- Vanda Symon (born 1969), crime novelist and radio host
- Melinda Szymanik (born 1963), children's author

== T ==
- Leilani Tamu, poet
- Violet Targuse (1884–1937), playwright
- Anna Taylor (born 1982), short story author
- Grace Taylor (born c.1984), poet and performer
- Renée Taylor (1929–2023), feminist writer and playwright
- Ngāhuia Te Awekōtuku (born 1949), Māori cultural academic and non-fiction writer
- Margaret Tennant (fl. 1980s), historian and non-fiction writer
- Brianne Te Paa (born 1984), children's author
- Ngaire Thomas (1943–2012), writer
- Kirsten Moana Thompson (born 1964), non-fiction writer
- Tayi Tibble (born 1995), poet
- Ariana Tikao (born 1971), non-fiction writer, musician and research librarian
- Mona Tracy (1882–1959), poet, short story writer, novelist and community worker
- Jill Trevelyan (born 1963), art historian and non-fiction writer

== U ==
- Makerita Urale (fl. 1990s), playwright, producer and documentary director

== V ==
- Kathryn van Beek (born 1980), short story writer, playwright, children's writer and illustrator

== W ==
- Dorothy Wall (1894–1942), children's writer and illustrator
- Louise Wallace (born 1983), poet
- Marilyn Waring (born 1952), feminist, politician and writer
- Kirsten Warner (born 1956), novelist, poet and journalist
- Enga Washbourn (1908–1988), non-fiction writer
- Joy Watson (1938–2021), children's writer
- Emma Wehipeihana (born 1983/4), journalist and memoirist
- Joyce West (1908–1985), novelist and children's writer
- Jessie Weston (1865–1939), novelist and journalist
- Philippa Werry (born 1958), writer
- Lydia Wevers (1950–2021), literary critic, English language literary historian, editor and book reviewer
- Mere Whaanga (born 1952), author and historian
- Reina Whaitiri (born 1943), scholar, essayist and poet
- Mabel Whitaker (1884–1976), teacher and local historian
- Annabelle White (living), food writer
- Dorothy Mary Neal White (1915–1995), librarian and writer
- Emily White (1839–1936), gardener and writer
- Cherry Wilder (1930–2002), short story writer and science fiction novelist
- Mona Williams (born 1943), children's author, memoirist, oral storyteller and writing teacher
- Helen Wilson (1869–1957), teacher, farmer, community leader and writer
- Vernice Wineera (1938–2024), poet, editor and educator
- Iona Winter (fl 2015), poet, editor
- Alison Wong (born 1960), poet and novelist
- Elizabeth Wong (born 1937), politician and novelist
- Susan Wood (1836–1880), writer
- Alice Woodhouse (1883–1977), librarian, journalist and broadcaster
- Mary Woodward (1928–2004), non-fiction writer
- Sue Wootton (born 1961), poet and short story writer
- Anne Eyre Worboys (1920–2007), novelist

== Y ==
- Sonja Yelich (born 1965), poet

== See also ==
- List of New Zealand writers
- List of New Zealand poets
- List of New Zealand women artists
- List of New Zealand women photographers
