= Alfred Augustus Grace =

NZ teacher, journalist, writer

Alfred A. Grace
- Born: Alfred Augustus Grace; May 1867; Auckland, New Zealand
- Died: 18 March 1942 (aged 74)
- Education: St John's College, Hurstpierpoint, Sussex
- Occupations: Writer and journalist
- Spouse: Amelia Adelaide Harriet Jennings (m. 1890)
- Children: 4
- Writing career
- Notable works: Maoriland stories Tales of a dying race

Alfred Augustus Grace (1867 – 18 March 1942) was a New Zealand teacher, journalist and writer. He was born in Auckland, Auckland, New Zealand in 1867. He wrote literature such as short stories, novels, folklore collections, and other literature that was read in New Zealand, Australia and England. Although he was known in his local communities for his contributions, he achieved nationwide fame for his writing. Grace wrote literature such as short stories and novels. Some of his famous literature was Maoriland stories, Tales of a dying race, and The tale of Timber Town. Grace majorly wrote stories that portray Maori cultures. His first major literature was called Maoriland stories that was published in 1895. He continuously wrote fiction until 1914 with The Tales of timber town as his last work.

He was the son of a church missionary in society church. his father's name was Thomas Samuel Grace and his mother's name was Agnes fearing. Grace married to Amelia Adelaide Harriet Jennings and their marriage produced with four children.

He undertook the majority of his education in England, where he moved in 1875. When he moved back to New Zealand, he worked as a teacher. however, he still wrote literature in his free time before he gathered seven of the short stories together as Maoriland stories. He had been to London and worked with Chatto & Windus to publish his literature there. the name of the literature was Tales of a Dying Race in 1901. in New Zealand, Grace collaborated with Gordon & Gutch to published a couple of works such as Folktales of Maori in 1907, Atareta, the Belle of the Kainga in 1908, Hone Tiki Dialogues in 1910, and The Tale of Timber Town in 1914. After 1914, Grace never published fiction literature again and died on 18 March 1942.

Alfred Augustus Grace was mentioned and cited in some other literatures such as in Henry Lawson Among Maoris in I section, Maoriland: New Zealand Literature 1872–1914 in Primary Texts and Secondary Sources sections

== Background ==
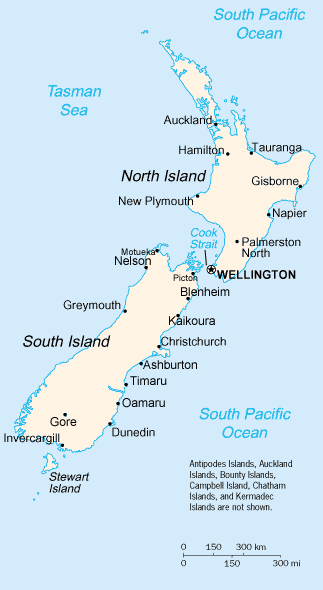
New Zealand map

Alfred Augustus Grace was the son of Thomas Samuel Grace who was church missionary in society church and Agnes Fearon. He was born in Auckland, New Zealand in May 1867 and he is the youngest of 12 siblings. His brother Thomas continues his father's missionary work, his brother William become a scholar of Maori, and his brother Lawrence was an interpreter. He lived in Taupo region but had forced to leave due to the outbreak of war soon after he was born. He travelled to England in 1875 with his parent and got a scholarship at St John's College, Hurstpierpoint, Sussex. In 1887, he returned to New Zealand and lived in Nelson which was where his family lived at that time. When he was in Nelson, Grace become a teacher while writing articles and short stories in the spare time. On 30 December 1890, he married Amelia Adelaide Harriet Jennings at christ church in Nelson and their marriage produced with four children. He was predeceased by one of his daughters in 1922. His wife died in 1938 and he died 4 years later on 18 March 1942.

== Life and career ==
When Grace move to Nelson, he was working as a teacher. Furthermore, Grace also a member of Maoriland School of Writing that was famous from 1896 until 1915. Grace had held a noticeable part in his local area such as a member of the committee of the Nelson branch of the Navy League, master of the Lodge Victory of Freemasons, and Nelson City Council member. Moreover, he also joined H Battery, New Zealand Regiment of Field Artillery Volunteers in 1902 which then attained the rank of lieutenant colonel of the Canterbury Field Artillery Brigade before his retirement in 1917. Furthermore, in a short period of time, he was also a secretary for the state control league of New Zealand.

However, Grace was recognised across the country as a journalist and writer as his short stories, folklore collections, novels, and other literature were read in New Zealand, England and Australia. In the journalistic and writing world Grace also known as Artemidorus because Grace used this name in some of his books. Many of Grace's works tell a story of an attractive people that were meant to be failed due to the unavoidable expansion of civilisation. Moreover, Those stories usually portrayed in nostalgic vibes and many of his literature talked about Māori cultures with which he was fascinated. Grace's fascination toward Māori cultures came from his family background. His family had close ties with Māori as two of his brothers married Māori women and his father had an interest in Māori cultures. One of the other reason why he picked this New Zealander culture as the main background in his stories other than his fascination for it was because, at that time, the main topic of debate was the New Zealand independence from Britain and it was supported by the majority of New Zealanders. Thus, due to this, Grace began to visualise a literature that would be unique to New Zealand in which then he picked Māori life and culture as it was something that differentiated New Zealand from England and Australia.

He produced short stories and articles for Australian periodicals including New Zealand illustrated Magazine, The Bulletin, and The Triad and subsequently published literature for himself. He wrote short stories such as Maoriland Stories in 1895 and Tales of a Dying Race in 1901, novels like The Tale of Timber Town in 1914, and substantial historical and topical works such as New Zealand in the next great war in 1894.

In the early part of his writing career, while he was a teacher, he wrote some stories which were published in New Zealand and Australian periodicals. in 1895, Grace selected seven of his stories and made one of his early books which was called Maoriland Stories. When it was published, the book received good feedback which established Grace as a writer in New Zealand.

Later on, Grace secured a firm in London called Chatto & Windus as the publisher of his second short stories which is Tales of a Dying Race. In London, the book sold well. The Auckland Free Lance thought that "His stories possess that warmth of colour and feeling which is sometimes considered to be too strong for the constitution of young persons of our nationality".

As his popularity increased, Grace's writing began a literary trend amongst his contemporary New Zealand writers. Furthermore, New Zealand Free Lance magazine also reviewed his writing style and said "Very few in New Zealand can express the humorous and whimsical side of the Maori character so aptly and so pleasantly". In 1914, after he published his last novel he did not write any other Maori culture-based stories and Grace did not write works of fiction anymore. However, he still practiced journalism as he published a history of Nelson City Council and wrote a guidebook about Nelson and its district.

== Published literature ==
=== Maoriland stories (1895) ===
Maoriland Stories was first published in 1895. This literature was printed by A. G. Betts. From 1895 until 2011, this book was published seven times. This was Grace's first mayor publication. This book consists of seven short stories that Grace wrote. Four of the stories are about settlers and the other three is about Māori and Māori-Pākehā/European relations. One of the stories on this book named The King’s Ngerengere. It was inspired by Grace own experience as in 1884, Grace and his family was visited by Patara Te Tuhi and the Maori King, Tawhiao which causes a scandal among neighbours due to their arrival.

=== Tales of a dying race (1901) ===
Tales of a Dying Race was firstly published in 1901 and was published 5 times after that. The publisher of Tales of a Dying Race is Chatto & Windus. Tales of a dying race consist of twenty eight tales. The four of the stories are Māori tales and the other twenty-four are not Māori tales but stories that talked about an interaction between people such as Māori, missionaries, merchants and settlers. Tales of a dying race received review from British critics, which described it as "a purposeful book, full of subtle meaning and tender sentiment ...and great insight into the manners and customs of our semi-savage dependents".

=== Folk tales of the Maori (1907) ===
Folktales of the Maori was firstly published in 1907 and fifteen editions have been published since 1097 until 2010. This literature was published in Wellington and the publisher of this literature was Gordon & Gotch. This book consists of tales that were collected by grace's Maori friend named Karepa Te Whetu of Ngāti Koata and then it was translated by Grace.

=== Atareta, the belle of the kainga (1908) ===
The first edition of Atareta, the Belle of the Kainga was published in 1908. This literature was published in Wellington and the publisher of this literature was Gordon & Gotch. Since then and until 1998, 9 editions of this novel were published. This book was mention in Kōtare 2008, Special Issue — Essays in New Zealand Literary Biography Series Two: ‘Early Male Prose Writers’ which was located in Alfred Grace, 1867-1942 section. Furthermore, Maoriland: New Zealand Literature 1872–1914 also mentions this novel in the Primary Texts section and also in The New Zealand Novel 1860-1965 on The Maori Again section. This novel is a melodramatic romance with early colonialism as the time frame. Theme of love, sex, and clash of pagan and Christian culture.

=== Hone Tiki dialogues (1910) ===
Hone Tiki Dialogue was introduced in New Zealand and Australia and published in 1910. This literature was published in Wellington and the publisher of this literature was Gordon & Gotch. It was published 7 more editions until 1999. Hone tiki dialogues have twelve drafts and it was set in Wellington. In it, there is an unnamed narrator who records the conversation with a Māori man named Hone Tiki. The usage of the Māori English Hone was a notable feature for this Dialogue which was rendered by phonetically.

=== The tale of Timber Town (1914) ===
The Tale of Timber Town was firstly published in 1914 and there were another 5 editions that were published from then until 2009. This literature was published in Wellington and the publisher of this literature was Gordon & Gotch. This literature is Grace's longest work and this story background is located in Nelson. The genre of this story is a melodramatic romance with the story of the 1866 Maungatapu murders which talk about the three brutally murdered men that were carrying gold to Nelson for goldfield as inspiration. This book is a murder story which talks about a hero called Jack Scarlett who involved with a European New Zealander, a Jewish woman, and a Māori maiden.

== Cited and mentioned ==
=== Cited in ===
Maoriland: New Zealand Literature 1872–1914 which in Introduction: Colonialism and Embarrassment, 3. Henry Lawson's Aesthetic Crisis, 5. Katherine Mansfield: A Modernist in Maoriland and Index sections.

The Cyclopedia of New Zealand [Nelson, Marlborough & Westland Provincial Districts] in Nelson Corporation Military section.

The New Zealand Novel 1860-1965 in The Maori Again, Bread and Butter, and Index of New Zealand Authors sections.

Henry Lawson Among Maoris in I section.

Kōtare 2008, Special Issue — Essays in New Zealand Literary Biography Series Two: ‘Early Male Prose Writers’ in the Introduction section.

Letters and Art in New Zealand in 5 — The Nineties section.

=== Mentioned in ===
Henry Lawson Among Maoris in 7 Lawson's Aesthetic Crisis section.

Kōtare 2008, Special Issue — Essays in New Zealand Literary Biography Series Two: ‘Early Male Prose Writers’ in Alfred Grace, 1867–1942 section.

Maoriland: New Zealand Literature 1872–1914 in Primary Texts and Secondary Sources sections.
