= Claudia Scott (academic) =

American-New Zealand academic (born 1945)

Claudia Scott ONZM
- Born: 1945 (age 80–81)
- Other name: Claudia Devita Scott
- Education: Mount Holyoke College, Duke University
- Spouse: Graham Scott
- Scientific career
- Thesis: Forecasting public outlays: an expenditure model for New Haven, Connecticut (1971)
- Doctoral students: Jackie Cumming

Claudia Devita Scott ONZM (born 1945) is an American-New Zealand academic. She is currently an emeritus professor of public policy at Victoria University of Wellington.

== Career ==
Scott completed her BA at Mount Holyoke College in Massachusetts. This was followed by MA and PhD qualifications at Duke University. Scott's 1971 PhD thesis was titled Forecasting public outlays: an expenditure model for New Haven, Connecticut.

Scott was appointed an honorary Officer of the New Zealand Order of Merit in the 1997 Queen's Birthday Honours, for services to public administration and the community.

Between 2003 and 2014 Scott was professor of public policy at the Australia and New Zealand School of Government and was appointed a fellow in 2015.

== Personal life ==
Scott and her partner, former Treasury secretary Graham Scott, have a family bach at Arthur's Pass in the South Island's Southern Alps. In 2004, their daughter Carla Devita Scott, 26, drowned while walking in the area.

== Selected works ==
- Scott, Claudia Devita. Public and private roles in health care systems. Vol. 39. Buckingham: Open University Press, 2001.
- Greene, Kenneth V., William B. Neenan, and Claudia Devita Scott. Fiscal Interactions in a Metropolitan Area. 1974.
- Scott, Claudia Devita, and Karen J. Baehler. Adding value to policy analysis and advice. Sydney: University of New South Wales Press, 2010.
- Scott, Claudia D. "Reform of the New Zealand health care system." Health Policy 29, no. 1-2 (1994): 25–40.
