= Kay Baxter (horticulturist) =

New Zealand organic horticulturist

Kay Baxter (born 1952 or 1953) is a New Zealand organic horticulturist, and co-founder of the Koanga Institute. Baxter is known for her work in permaculture gardening, conservation, and sustainable food production. She has written books on landscape planning, seed saving, and plant heritage and teaches courses and workshops on regenerative agriculture and gardening.

Through the Koanga Institute, she has led New Zealand’s largest collection of over 800 lines of New Zealand heritage vegetable seeds, and over 400 varieties of New Zealand heritage fruit tree and berries.

== Early life and education ==
Baxter's childhood was spent moving around the South Island, wherever her schoolteacher father could find work. From an early age she learned how to grow food to eat. “We were pretty poor, and we lived out of the garden.”

As an adult, she studied geology and sociology at Massey University.

== Career ==
Baxter began collecting heritage seeds in New Zealand after the Chernobyl disaster. She learned that the nuclear fallout was happening throughout Europe with friends in Holland bulldozing all their farms' topsoil so they could continue farming. A few months later, a local gardener informed her that the only New Zealand heritage seeds you could buy were Pukekohe Long Keeper onions and all the rest came from Holland. Concerned with the future of New Zealand's heritage plant sustainability, she co-founded the Koanga Institute and spent the last the past 30 years dedicated to building a collection of heritage seeds and fruit trees, first in Northland, then on leased land near Wairoa in Hawke's Bay.

Today the Koanga Institute is a farm, forest garden, centre for permaculture education and home to the collection of heritage New Zealand seeds. It's 50 hectares of 100 percent organic, regenerative and New Zealand grown seeds, trees, perennials.

== Selected works ==
- Design your own orchard : bringing permaculture design to the ground in Aotearoa. Maungaturoto, NZ: Koanga Gardens. 80 pp. ISBN 9780958289436 (2002)
- Koanga Garden Guide: A complete guide to gardening organically and regeneratively. Maungaturoto, NZ: Koanga Gardens. 367 pp. ISBN 9780958289405 (2015)
