= Denis Baker =

New Zealand writer (born 1966)

- Born: 1966 (age 58–59)
- Occupation: Novelist; short story writer

Denis Baker (born 1966) is a New Zealand novelist and short story writer.

== Life and career ==
Baker was born in 1966 and grew up in Auckland. He left New Zealand in 1987 and moved to London, where he attended Birkbeck College at the University of London until 1991. From 1991 to 1992 he attended the University of North Carolina at Greensboro. As of 2022 he is based in Switzerland.

In 1998 he was the runner-up in the Sunday Star-Times short story competition, and in 1999 he was the runner up in the Takahe short story competition. In 2000 his collection of short stories, Floating Lines, was published. A review by Lydia Wevers described it as featuring male narrators who "express their emotions and are very aware of the games men play, the damage they do, the wounds they sustain"; she concluded that "realist masculine fiction in this country is in good shape".

In 2002 he received a Buddle Findlay Sargeson Fellowship. His first novel, On a Distant Island, was published the same year. It is a novel about the New Zealand overseas experience ("OE") tradition, and was described in a review for The New Zealand Herald as an "intricately woven and totally engrossing story".
