= Abby Gaines =

New Zealand romance novelist

Abby Gaines is a romance novelist from New Zealand.

Gaines wrote her first romance novel as a teenager and submitted it to Mills and Boon for publication; the company rejected it. After her graduation from high school she attended university, where she studied French, German, Japanese and Spanish for a B.A. Following university, she worked for IBM, where she met her husband. She quit work after her children were born and instead freelanced as a business journalist.

When she decided to begin writing a romance novel, she told her husband that she expected to sell her first novel within three months. Five years later, she received her first publishing contract from Harlequin Superromance. After hearing that Harlequin Books had signed a product licensing deal with NASCAR, Gaines, who edits 'The Dirt', an open wheel speedway magazine, sent a story proposal to the company. Since then she has had the opportunity to write four novels with NASCAR themes. Two of them were published in 2007, with two others set for publication in 2008.

== Bibliography ==
- Whose Lie Is It Anyway? (2007)
- Married by Mistake (2007)
- Back on Track (2007)

=== Omnibus ===
- A NASCAR Holiday 2 (2007) (with Pamela Britton, Ken Casper and Gina Wilkins)
