= Colleen Maria Lenihan =

New Zealand writer

Colleen Maria Lenihan is a New Zealand fiction writer and screenwriter.

== Background ==
Lenihan (Te Rarawa, Ngāpuhi) is a New Zealand writer of Māori and Irish descent. She spent fifteen years in Tokyo before returning to New Zealand. Lenihan studied at The Creative Hub and Te Papa Tupu, and is currently a writer for TV show Shortland Street. She has also written for drama series Ahikāroa.

== Career ==
Her short form work has appeared in Pantograph Punch, Newsroom, the New Zealand Herald, and elsewhere. Following the 2022 launch of her collection of inter-linked short stories, Kōhine, she appeared in the 2023 Auckland Writers Festival.

Kōhine has been described as "Tokyo gothic" by Newsroom, as "something special" by Kete, and by NZ Booklovers as providing the reading experience of a novel. The book was influenced by Colleen's years in Tokyo, and by the loss of her only child.

== Works ==
- Kōhine (Huia Publishers, 2022), collection of short stories

== Awards ==
- Victoria University of Wellington, International Institute of Modern Letters (IIML) and Creative New Zealand Emerging Māori Writer in Residence (2023)
- Dan Davin Literary Foundation (2021)
- Michael King Writers Centre Emerging Māori Writer (2019)
- Newsroom/Surrey Hotel Winner (2019)
