= Mary St Domitille Hickey =

NZ Catholic nun, school principal, historian

Mary St Domitille Hickey (13 April 1882 – 20 June 1958) was a New Zealand Catholic nun, school principal and historian. She was born in Ōpunake, New Zealand, on 13 April 1882.

In 1953, she was awarded the Queen Elizabeth II Coronation Medal.
