= Alice Annie Kenny =

NZ poet, short-story writer, novelist

Alice Annie Kenny (31 August 1875 – 15 May 1960) was a New Zealand poet, short-story writer, children's author and novelist. She was born in Ngāruawāhia, Waikato, on 31 August 1875.

== Books ==
=== For adults ===
- The Fugitives (1923, published as a newspaper serial)
- The Elmslie Mystery (1934)
- The Rebel (1934)

=== For younger readers ===
- Esmeralda, Primrose and the Boy Pirate (1930, published as a newspaper serial)
- The Lost Children (1930, published as a newspaper serial)
- Wrongly Accused (1931, published as a newspaper serial)
- The Enchanted Kiwi: A Tale for Children (1937)
- The Good Goblin and Other Verses (1939)
- The Magic Rings (1943)
- The Toymaker's House (1944)
- Tai and Tu (1944)
- Kee-Kee the Kiwi (1944)
- Forest Refuge: A Story for Girls (1944)
- Smugglers Tower (1945)
- The Sea Cave (1945)
- Robinhood Girls (1945)
- The Witch's Daughter (1947)
- The King's Men in India: William Carey, Alexander Duff, Sadhu Sundar Singh (1947)
- The King's Women in India: Elizabeth Mary Clark, Pandita Ramabai, Dr. Isabel Kerr (1947)
