= Elizabeth Messenger =

NZ journalist, cookery writer, crime novelist

Elizabeth Messenger (25 July 1908 – 4 January 1965) was a New Zealand journalist, cookery writer and crime novelist. She was born in Thames, Thames/Coromandel, New Zealand on 25 July 1908.
