= Janet McCallum (writer) =

New Zealand non-fiction writer (1947–2015)

- Born: 1947; Calcutta, India
- Died: 2015 (aged 67–68)
- Education: Victoria University of Wellington (MA)
- Occupations: Non-fiction writer and journalist
- Children: 3
- Writing career
- Notable works: Women in the House (1993); Women and their Words (2009)

Janet Mary Candon McCallum (1947–2015) was a New Zealand non-fiction writer and journalist, best known for her books and articles about New Zealand women.

== Life and career ==
McCallum was born in 1947 in Kolkata (then Calcutta) to British parents. Her family moved to New Zealand in 1948, where she grew up on a farm in the Wairarapa region and went to a Catholic boarding school in Wellington. She graduated from Victoria University of Wellington with a bachelor's degree followed by a master's degree in French and Russian. She and her husband had three children.

In the 1970s she published works relating to Māori culture including In Search of a Dialect: An explanatory study of the informal speech of some Maori and Pakeha children (1975) and He Pioke no Rangaunu: Exercises and Games for Practice in Maori (1975).

Her first book, Women in the House, was published in 1993, and provides biographical information about the 36 female members of Parliament in New Zealand who were elected from 1893 to 1993. She had previously contributed essays and articles to Herstory Diary (1984), Women in Wartime (1986), Wilderness Women (1989), The Book of New Zealand Women (1991) and The Dictionary of New Zealand Biography.

In 1992 she was awarded the National Library Fellowship to research early women journalists in New Zealand. She received a further $10,000 grant from the New Zealand History Research Trust in 1996. This research work led to her second book, Women and their Words: Notable Pioneers in New Zealand Journalism, which was published in 2009. An Otago Daily Times review said McCallum had "delved deeply to deliver up the experiences of a great many would-be women journalists in New Zealand from the 1860s till the late 1940s", and concluded that the book would be "an inspiration to all present-day women reporters". A review in Northern Advocate concluded "McCallum did exhaustive research for this book, and the reader is rewarded for it".

McCallum died in 2015.

== Selected works ==
- Women in the House (Cape Catley, 1993)
- Women and their Words: Notable Pioneers in New Zealand Journalism (Fraser Books, 2009)
