= Fiona Cross =

New Zealand arachnologist

Fiona Ruth Cross
- Education: University of Canterbury
- Scientific career
- Fields: Arachnology
- Workplaces: University of Canterbury
- Thesis: Attentional processes in mosquito-eating jumping spiders: search images and cross-modality priming (2009)
- Website: Canterbury University page

Fiona Ruth Cross is a New Zealand arachnologist. She did both her MSc and PhD theses at the University of Canterbury in Christchurch, New Zealand.

Cross is best known for detecting food preference in East African Evarcha culicivora spiders for female Anopheles mosquitos fed recently on mammalian blood.

== Selected works ==
- Attentional processes in mosquito-eating jumping spiders: search imagesand cross-modality priming PhD thesis. University of Canterbury 2009.
- How mosquito-eating jumping spiders communicate: complex display sequences, selective attention and cross-modality priming MSc thesis. University of Canterbury 2003.
- Natural diet and prey-choice behaviour of Aelurillus muganicus (Araneae: Salticidae), a myrmecophagic jumping spider from Azerbaijan in Journal of Zoology, 2005.
- Male and Female Mate-Choice Decisions by Evarcha culicivora, An East African Jumping Spider in Ethology 2007.
- Complex display behaviour of Evarcha culicivora, an East African mosquito‐eating jumping spider in New Zealand Journal of Zoology 2010.
- How blood-derived odor influences mate-choice decisions by a mosquito-eating predator in PNAS, 2009
