= Marlene J Bennetts =

New Zealand writer (born 1938)

Marlene J Bennetts MNZM
- Born: Marlene Joan Anderson; 9 March 1938 (age 87); Westport, New Zealand
- Occupations: Poet; children's author
- Spouse: Neville Bennetts (m. 1957)
- Children: 3

Marlene Joan Bennetts MNZM (née Anderson; born 9 March 1938) is a New Zealand poet and children's author.

== Life and career ==
Bennetts was born in Westport on 9 March 1938. She is of Ngāti Awa and Te Āti Awa descent. As a child her family travelled frequently due to her father's work in sawmills, and she attended 15 different schools. In 1957 she married Neville (Hec) Bennetts; they have three children.

Her poetry has been published in various anthologies including Katherine Mansfield Centennial Issue (1998), Poetry Kanto (1989), Poets for Africa (1986), and The President's Awards for Literary Excellence (1995). In 1993 the British magazine Dandelion awarded her the Dolores Boccanera Poetry Prize for her poem "Needlepoint Love".

She has written a number of works for children, including eleven books which have been translated into te reo Māori and a collection of poetry, Caboodle (2005). She participates in Read NZ Te Pou Muramura's Writers in Schools programme.

In the 2003 Queen's Birthday Honours, Bennetts was appointed a Member of the New Zealand Order of Merit, for services to literature.

In 2022 Bennetts published her autobiography, Whakaaetanga/Acceptance. She donated 95% of the profits from the work to Hei Whakapiki Mauri, an organisation supporting Māori with disabilities.

== Selected works ==
=== Poetry collections ===
- Return to the Coast (Emjay Publishing, 1990)
- Coastal Cornerstones (Emjay Publishing, 1991)
- Beyond the Coast (Emjay Publishing, 2001)

=== Works for children ===
- Caboodle, with Deborah Macowan (Emjay Publishing, 2005)
- No Ordinary Flower Girl, illustrated by Trish Bowles (Reed Books, 2007)
- One of the Dambusters, illustrated by Trish Bowles (Penguin Group, 2008)
- A Statute of Honour, illustrated by Ann McCaw (Emjay Publishing, 2020)

=== Other works ===
- Whakaaetanga/Acceptance (autobiography, Emjay Publishing, 2022)
