= Jackie Cumming =

NZ professor in government

Jacqueline Margaret Cumming
- Education: Victoria University of Wellington
- Awards: HSRAANZ Professional Award 2013
- Scientific career
- Fields: health economics and health policy
- Thesis: Health Services Coverage Regulation: an Evaluation of Policy Options for New Zealand (2003)
- Doctoral advisor: Claudia Scott

Jacqueline Margaret (Jackie) Cumming is a New Zealand professor in the School of Government at Victoria University of Wellington

== Academic career ==
After a BA and MA from the University of Auckland and a Diploma in Health Economics from the University of Tromsø, Cumming completed a PhD at Victoria University of Wellington in 2003 titled Health Services Coverage Regulation: an Evaluation of Policy Options for New Zealand. She later joined the Victoria faculty, rising to professor.

Cumming led the Health Reforms 2001 Research Project at Victoria which assessed the impacts of the New Zealand Public Health and Disability Act 2000 and other health initiatives under the Helen Clark government.

2013 research led by Cumming into regional differences in charges for doctors' visits and prescriptions was widely reported in the New Zealand media.

Cumming has supervised 21 PhD students, accumulated 100 publications and secured over $30 million in research funding.

== Selected works ==
- Primary health organisations, 2003.
- Nursing developments in primary health care, 2001–2007, 2009.
