= Maria Samuela =

New Zealand writer

Maria Teresa Samuela (born 12 July 1972) is a New Zealand writer of Cook Islands descent. She began her writing career in the 1990s, writing stories for children, and has been published in various journals and anthologies.

== Early life and family ==
Samuela was born in Wellington on 12 July 1972. Her mother had emigrated from Rarotonga, in the Cook Islands in the 1950s. Samuela studied at Victoria University of Wellington, graduating with a Bachelor of Arts degree in 2002.

== Career ==
Samuela returned to Victoria University of Wellington, where she undertook the creative writing programme at the International Institute of Modern Letters (IIML). Upon completion of her studies, Samuela attained a Master of Arts degree in creative writing.

Samuela has been the writer in residence at the Michael King Writers Centre and Victoria University Bookshop. In 2018, she was the University Bookshop Summer Writer in Residence, an award made in association with Robert Lord Writers' Cottage Trust. In 2022, Samuela was awarded a research grant to support her work on a novel about young women from the Cook Islands who migrated to New Zealand in the period from the 1930s to the 1950s. Samuela writes short stories predominantly about the Cook Island diaspora, and her 2022 collection of short stories, Beats of the Pa'u reflects her childhood in the Porirua suburb of Cannons Creek.

== Publications ==
- Beats of the Pa'u (2022)
- Love Rules (n.d.)
- Bluey (2022)
- The Peach Tree (2022)
