= Mabel Whitaker =

New Zealand teacher and historian

Mabel Whitaker (1884–1976) was a New Zealand teacher and local historian. Her career spanned almost 50 years during which time she was widely hailed for her innovative teaching methods. In retirement, she wrote about early pioneer settlers from a woman's perspective.

== Life and work ==
Whitaker was born in Belfast, North Canterbury, New Zealand, on 11 May 1884, the daughter of Margaret Boyce and her husband, Edward Robert Ward Wilson, a farmer. When Mabel was about nine the family moved to Stratford on the North Island, but they returned to the South Island when she was 13 or 14 and lived at Kaikōura. They eventually settled about 43 miles northeast of Stratford and lived on a sheep farm.

She began her education at the Stratford District High School, but after moving to the South Island, she completed her education through correspondence courses, graduating in December 1907, and obtaining her Teacher's C Certificate in January 1911.

Her first teaching assignment was as an assistant teacher at Kapuni School in 1908. From 1909 to 1913, she had a "sole-charge position" at Marco School, near Kōhuratahi, riding to and from school on horseback. From 1913 and 1919 she worked for the Auckland and Whanganui boards of education as a reliever.

After moving to Inglewood on the North Island, Whitaker was named head teacher at the two-teacher Norfolk School, near her hometown. She taught there for five years, but apparently was forced to leave the position during the depression when married women were banned from teaching.

Her work as a local historian began with a request from the local board of education board.

When the Taranaki Education Board asked its teachers to collate the pioneer history of their districts, Mabel Whitaker, with the aid of the Norfolk womenfolk and schoolchildren, produced the major part of a handwritten and -illustrated booklet, 'A survey of the district, 1841–1939'. The project was an ambitious foray into local history. It drew on a range of sources, including the reminiscences of the 'oldest inhabitants'. Instead of following a strict chronology the booklet is arranged under subject headings and is written in an anecdotal style. Perhaps the main interest of the work today is the glimpse it provides of the attitudes and prejudices of a rural settler community.

Whitaker went on to become a founding member of the Norfolk Women's Institute in 1931. As part of that effort, she also formed a choir in Inglewood in the mid 1940s for both the Women's Institute as well as the local branch of the Women's Division of the New Zealand Farmers' Union.

In her retirement years she wrote and illustrated 'Pioneer tales from Taranaki's rough north-east backblocks', which is a collection of stories, lyrics, photographs and drawings, in which she "claims to see the past from a woman's perspective." Her manuscript, held at the Taranaki Museum, remains unpublished.

Mabel Whitaker died on 10 July 1976, at the age of 92, in New Plymouth. She was buried in the Awanui cemetery.

== Personal life ==
At the age of 33, on 19 May 1917, Mabel married Walter Morris Whitaker, from New Plymouth. Her husband was stationed at Featherston Military Camp and left the country soon after the wedding to join New Zealand forces during the conclusion of the First World War. The couple went on to have two sons: Edward, born in 1920, and Robert, born in 1926.
