= Catherine Hay =

New Zealand novelist

Catherine Hay (1910–1995), born Rose Hughes, was a New Zealand historical romance novelist. She grew up on a farm in Te Kūiti and supported her writing career through clerical work.

== List of works ==
- Julia Deverell (1962)
- The Singing Water (1963)
- Halo Round the Moon (1964)
- A Falcon Rising (1966)
- The Barrier (1968)
- The House at Stormy Waters (1970)
