= Una Carter =

New Zealand cooking teacher, demonstrator and writer

- Born: 20 August 1890 near Marton, New Zealand
- Died: 14 October 1954 (aged 64); London, England
- Known for: Author of best-selling cookbook, demonstration cook

Una Isabel Carter (20 August 1890 – 14 October 1954) was a New Zealand cooking teacher, demonstrator and writer. She was born in Upper Tutaenui, near Marton, New Zealand on 20 August 1890.

== Early life ==
Carter was born in 1890, to Manawatu farmers William and Selina Carter (born Brown). Carter had one older sister, Lena, and two younger brothers, William and Shirer. Shirer enlisted in World War I and died in 1918. Selina Carter was known in the community as an excellent cook and spent a significant amount of time teaching her daughters to cook.

== Career and professional life ==
In 1913, Carter opened her own cookery school in Willis Street, Wellington. The school offered classes several times a week and for a variety of ability levels, including Saturday morning classes for children. Soon after this, the Wellington Gas Company hired Carter to give weekly cooking demonstrations in their showroom, to show the benefits of using gas for home cooking. Carter's demonstrations covered a wide variety of food, meals and techniques, and were noted for their usefulness, the practical tips and Carter's own style - friendly and informative.

In addition to her regular demonstrations, Carter also provided cooking demonstrations on behalf of the Wellington Gas Company at the annual Wellington Show, judged cooking competitions and toured New Zealand and Australia with cooking shows.

As Carter's cooking became increasingly well-known and popular, she published her recipes in book form - initially, in 1918, as a collection of 400 recipes entitled The National Cookery Book. The book was so popular it was expanded to 800 recipes, re-published in 1922, and subsequently reprinted eleven times. All royalties from this book were donated by Carter to St Mark's Church School in Wellington.

Carter also self-published a smaller book, Home made sweets, in 1917, in which she encouraged New Zealand women to make sweets and send them to soldiers fighting overseas as a comfort gift. The book was highly popular and went into three editions.

== Later life ==
Carter married Albert (Bert) Stanley in 1924 and moved to Remuera, Auckland. Companies began to hire her to write recipes to promote their products - for example, in the early 1930s, she was hired by Ellis and Manton Ltd, of Wellington, to write a leaflet of recipes using their products that was distributed free to customers. The leaflet was promoted with the words "All recipes tested by Miss Una Carter, expert cooking demonstrator". Lea & Perrins and Champion Flour similarly hired her to recommend their products in recipes used for advertising - the flour company included two free "Una Carter Recipe Cards" in every bag of flour

From July 1931, she is referred to in newspaper notices as "Una Carter, Gold Medallist" however it is unclear the source of the award.

On Stanley's death, Carter returned to Wellington and enjoyed retirement teaching cooking to her nieces and nephews.

She also returned to demonstration cooking, giving demonstrations again for the Wellington Gas Company from 1936 and at the New Zealand Centennial Exhibition in 1940.

During World War II the Women's War Service Auxiliary arranged for Carter to give demonstrations focusing on cooking during the war-time shortages.

Carter went to live in England in the early 1950s and died in London on 14 October 1954.
