= Jeanne Bernhardt =

New Zealand poet and writer

Jeanne Bernhardt (born 1961) is a contemporary New Zealand writer, known for her daring experimental poetry and prose, who has travelled extensively, working both in New Zealand and overseas.

== Life ==
She attended the University of New South Wales in Sydney majoring in art theory and installation.

She has spent her life travelling and living throughout New Zealand, Australia the South Pacific and the United States.

To support her writing she has had a variety of work including, working on a fishing boat in Alaska, caretaker of cattle ranch in New Mexico, farmer, working with street kids in Australia, librarian, labourer, and drug counsellor.

She has lived more recently in Central Otago in South Island of New Zealand.

== Literary output ==
She started out end of the 1970s and in the Dunedin poetry scene and appeared on Dunedin Poets (1983) sound recording, and began publishing in the 1990s with Dereliction (1996), the experimental multi media art and words book Vorare Lacuna (1996) and the short fiction debut baby, is this wonderland? (1999).

City Voice wrote of baby, is this wonderland? : “'Drawing on junkie king Bill Burroughs and with shades of Kathy Acker, Bernhardt's subject and style are a well-travelled literary path but with her intense insight and assured rhythms she creates work and a beauty in squalor that is all her own.”

In 1998, she was included in the Generation X anthology, The NeXt Wave, edited by Mark Pirie.

Bernhardt’s poetry and prose has been published in journals like Black Mail Press, Spec, Poetry NZ, Takahē, JAAM, Etisoppo, Poetry Aotearoa, broadsheet, Otago Daily Times, the Earl of Seacliff Winter Readings anthologies and The Press (Christchurch).

She published the poetry book The Snow Poems/your self of lost ground (2002), after she left New Zealand for the United States.

In 2004, she was included in the anthology JAAM 21 “Greatest Hits”, edited by Mark Pirie and Michael O'Leary, as well as Mark Pirie's selection of recent New Zealand poetry for papertiger: new world poetry (Australia). She published a mini series booklet The Deaf Man’s Chorus (poetry, 2006).

David Eggleton wrote of The Deaf Man’s Chorus: “Jeanne C. Bernhardt, by contrast in The Deaf Man’s Chorus (Number 7) offers a musical minimalism, a distilled language that reminds you of raindrops dripping from fern fronds, with delicate phrases about mutability and fragility. Her poems, pared-down, spare to the point of elusiveness, seem like explorations of fragmented identity. Out of isolation they emerge as small gestures of communication: “I dug a garden / gathered books to me like children.”

In 2008 her poem ‘Not as it was’ was selected for a sound recording by The Pioneers recorded in Oslo, Norway and featuring poems set to music by New Zealand poets such as Bill Manhire and James K. Baxter.

She returned to New Zealand to publish a series of books: Wood (short prose), 26 Poems and Fast Down Turk (a novel), these were with Dean Havard’s hand-printed Kilmog Press in Dunedin.

Her work has since appeared in Phantom Billstickers Café Reader and she was the featured poet in broadsheet 22, November 2018. That same year, Tangerine Press published Bernhardt’s hand-bound limited edition Silver City and Two More (short stories) in the UK.

In 2021, HeadworX/The Night Press published The Narrator (short story).

== Awards and recognition ==
In 1997, she was awarded the Louis Johnson New Writer’s Bursary from Creative New Zealand.

In 2016, she was awarded the Earl of Seacliff Poetry Prize.

== Bibliography ==
- Dereliction (Yello, 1996)
- Vorare Lacuna (self-published, 1996)
- baby, is this wonderland? (HeadworX Publishers, Wellington, New Zealand, 1999)
- The Snow Poems/your self of lost ground (HeadworX Publishers, Wellington, New Zealand, 2002)
- The Deaf Man’s Chorus (Earl of Seacliff Art Workshop, Paekakariki, New Zealand, 2006)
- Two Poems (The Night Press, Wellington, New Zealand, 2007)
- Fast Down Turk (Kilmog Press, Dunedin, New Zealand, 2008)
- Wood (Kilmog Press, Dunedin, New Zealand, 2009)
- 26 Poems (Kilmog Press, Dunedin, New Zealand, 2009)
- Silver City and Two More (Tangerine Press, UK, 2018)
- The Narrator (The Night Press/HeadworX, Wellington, New Zealand, 2021)
