= Ellen Hewett =

New Zealand writer

Ellen Anne Hewett (née Baker, 15 July 1843 – 14 February 1926) was a New Zealand writer. She was born in Jersey, Channel Islands, on 15 July 1843. She was buried at Purewa Cemetery.
