= Jane Elizabeth Harris =

NZ writer, lecturer, spiritualist

Jane Elizabeth Harris (c.1853 – 18 September 1942) was a New Zealand writer, lecturer and spiritualist. She was born in London, England on c.1853.
