= Grace Green =

NZ radio broadcaster, journalist (1907–1976)

Grace Winifred Green (13 February 1907 – 25 May 1976) was a New Zealand radio broadcaster and journalist. She was born in Christchurch, New Zealand on 13 February 1907.

She is buried at Ruru Lawn Cemetery in Christchurch.
