= Lisa Greenwood =

New Zealand novelist

Lisa Greenwood (born 1955) is a New Zealand novelist. She was the 1990 recipient of the Katherine Mansfield Menton Fellowship, one of New Zealand's foremost literary awards.

== Early life ==
Greenwood was born in Westmere, Auckland. She lives in Auckland and has one daughter, born in 1977. She began writing full-time when her daughter started school in 1983, and preferred to write her novels by hand rather than using a word processor or typewriter.

== Literary career ==
Greenwood's first novel, The Roundness of Eggs, was published in 1986. It is the story of a 52-year-old woman undergoing a psychological crisis. A second edition was published in the UK by feminist publishing company The Women's Press. Journalist Pauline Willis, reviewing the novel for The Guardian, commented that it was an "auspicious start for a young New Zealand novelist, following in the tradition of Janet Frame", and observed that it was interesting that a young women should "choose to explore an older woman's problems". The Press noted that "rarely are first novels so well shaped, with language, imagery and incident all contributing to the overall form of the book".

Her second novel, Daylight Burning, was published in 1990. This book is described by the Oxford Companion to New Zealand Literature as " a powerful and darkly bizarre account of an Auckland businessman whose yuppie life is transformed by an apparently prophetic vision of Auckland destroyed by nuclear holocaust".

In 1990, Greenwood spent time working on a novel in Menton, France as the recipient of the Katherine Mansfield Menton Fellowship, which she intended to be a historical novel about women in religious life set in medieval times.
