= Violet Roche =

NZ journalist and welfare worker

Violet Augusta Roche MBE (1885–1967) was born in Te Awamutu, New Zealand, in 1885. She was a welfare worker and journalist who wrote numerous articles between 1935 and 1950 for Walkabout.

She is credited with reviving and sustaining the New Zealand branch of the Barnardo’s children's charity for many years. In the 1964 New Year Honours, Roche was appointed a Member of the Order of the British Empire, for services to the community, especially in connection with Dr Barbado's Homes.
