= Antonija Mitrović =

New Zealand computer scientist

Antonija Mitrovic
- Тања Митровић
- Education: University of Niš
- Scientific career
- Workplaces: University of Canterbury
- Thesis: Реконструктивни прилаз моделирању ученика у интелигентним образовним системима / Reconstructive approach to student modeling in intelligent educational systems (1994)

Antonija Tanja Mitrović is a New Zealand computer scientist who was born in Serbia.

Mitrovic did her MSc and PhD at the University of Niš in Niš, Serbia. Before moving to the University of Canterbury in Christchurch, New Zealand and rising to the level of professor.

Mitrovic specialises in artificial intelligence methods in online-learning systems, particularly in modelling the students' understanding based on previous questions and using the model to select future questions.

== Selected works ==
- Evaluation of a constraint-based tutor for a database language A Mitrovic, S Ohlsson University of Canterbury. Computer Science and Software Engineering. 1999
- Optimising ITS behaviour with Bayesian networks and decision theory M Mayo, A Mitrovic. International Journal of Artificial Intelligence in Education. 2001
- An intelligent SQL tutor on the web A Mitrovic. International Journal of Artificial Intelligence in Education 13 (2), 173–197 2003
- A comparative analysis of cognitive tutoring and constraint-based modeling A Mitrovic, KR Koedinger, B Martin User Modeling 2003, 313–322 2003
- Constraint-based tutors: a success story A Mitrovic, M Mayo, P Suraweera, B Martin Engineering of Intelligent Systems, 931–940 2001
- Using evaluation to shape ITS design: Results and experiences with SQL-Tutor A Mitrovic, B Martin, M Mayo User Modeling and User-Adapted Interaction 12 (2–3), 243–279. 2002
- KERMIT: a constraint-based tutor for database modeling P Suraweera, A Mitrovic. Intelligent Tutoring Systems, 377–387 2002
- An intelligent tutoring system for entity relationship modelling P Suraweera, A Mitrovic International Journal of Artificial Intelligence in Education 14 (3), 375–417 2004
