= Emilie Monson Malcolm =

NZ homemaker, writer

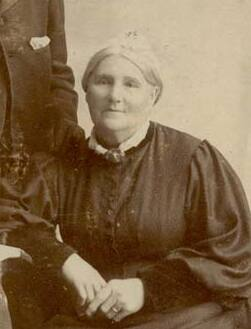
Emilie Malcolm, 1890

Emilie Monson Malcolm (c.1830 – 10 June 1905) was a New Zealand homemaker and writer.

Emilie Monson Wilton was born in England c. 1829 or 1830. In 1848, she married the barrister, Neill Malcolm. In 1850, with their infant daughter, Fanny, they emigrated to New Zealand, arriving in 1851 in Auckland. My own story, based on her diaries, was published in her later years. She died in Avondale, Auckland, in 1905.
