= Anne Eyre Worboys =

New Zealand/British writer

Annette Isobel Eyre Worboys
- Born: Annette Isobel Eyre; 1920; Auckland, New Zealand
- Died: June 2007 (aged 86–87); Leigh, Kent, England
- Citizenship: British
- Occupation: Novelist
- Spouse: Walter Brindy Worboys
- Children: 2
- Writing career
- Pen name: Anne Eyre Worboys; Annette Eyre; Vicky Maxwell; Anne Worboys
- Language: English
- Period: 1961–1999
- Genres: Romance, suspense
- Notable awards: RoNA Award

Anne Eyre Worboys (1920 – June 2007) was a New Zealand-British writer of 40 romance and suspense novels. She also signed her novels as Annette Eyre and Anne Worboys, and under the pseudonym of Vicky Maxwell. In 1977, her novel Every Man A King (a.k.a. Rendezvous with Fear) won the Romantic Novel of the Year Award by the Romantic Novelists' Association.

== Biography ==
=== Personal life ===
Born Annette Isobel Eyre on 1920 in Auckland, New Zealand, daughter of Agnes Helen (Blair) and Thomas Edwardes Eyre. She served in the Royal New Zealand Air Force, from 1942 to 1945.

On 20 September 1946, she married Walter Brindy Worboys, and had two daughters, Carolyn and Robin.

Annette Worboys died in June 2007 in Leigh, Kent, England, UK.

=== Career and works ===
She started writing romances as Anne Eyre Worboys and Annette Eyre, after five romances under the pseudonym of Vicky Maxwell, she wrote as Anne Worboys suspense novels with some romantic elements. She won the Mary Elgin Award in 1975, and the Romantic Novel of the Year Award by the Romantic Novelists' Association in 1977 by her novel Every Man A King (a.k.a. Rendezvous with Fear).

== Bibliography ==
Some novels are reedited under different titles or pennames.

=== As Anne Eyre Worboys ===
==== Single novels ====
- Dream of Petals Whim (1961)
- Palm Rock and Paradise (1961)
- Call from a Stranger (1962)

=== As Annette Eyre ===
==== Single novels ====
- Three Strings to a Fortune (1962)
- Visit to Rata Creek (1964)
- The Valley of Yesterday (1965)
- A Net to Catch the Wind (1966)
- Return to Bell Bird Country (1966)
- The House of Five Pines (1967)
- The River and Wilderness (1967) a.k.a. Give Me Your Love
- A Wind from the Hill (1968)
- Thorn-Apple (1968)
- Tread Softly in the Sun (1969)
- Dolphin Bay (1970)
- The Little Millstones (1970)
- Rainbow Child (1971)
- The Magnolia Room (1972)
- Venetian Inheritance (1973)

=== As Vicky Maxwell ===
==== Single novels ====
- Chosen Child (1973)
- Flight to the Villa Mistra (1973)
- The Way of the Tamarisk (1974)
- High Hostage (1976)
- The Other Side of Summer (1977)

=== As Anne Worboys ===
==== Single novels ====
- The Lion of Delos (1974)
- Every Man a King (1975) a.k.a. Rendezvous with Fear
- The Barrancourt Destiny (1977)
- The Bhunda Jewels (1980)
- Run, Sara, Run (1981)
- Greek Idyll (1983)
- A Kingdom for the Bold (1986) a.k.a. Aurora Rose
- China Silk (1991)
- Alice (1992)
- Village Sins (1994)
- Season of the Senses (1996)
- You Can't Sing Without Me (1996)
- Hotel Girl (1997)
- Relative Strangers (1997)
- House of Destiny (1998)
- Shifting Sands (1999)
