= Muriel May =

New Zealand school principal and writer (1897–1982)

Muriel Wallace May OBE (13 April 1897 – 11 August 1982) was a New Zealand teacher, school principal and writer. She was born in Dunedin, New Zealand, on 13 April 1897.

In 1953, May was awarded the Queen Elizabeth II Coronation Medal. In the 1976 New Year Honours, she was appointed an Officer of the Order of the British Empire, for services to education and literature.
