= Elizabeth Kelso =

NZ journalist, editor, community leader

Elizabeth Kelso (28 May 1889 – 7 July 1967) was a New Zealand journalist, editor and community leader. She was born in Fort William, Argyllshire, Scotland on 28 May 1889.
