= Suzi Kerr =

New Zealand economist

- Born: 1966 (age 59–60)
- Other name: Suzi Clare Kerr
- Education: Canterbury University (B.S.); Harvard University (Ph.D.)
- Scientific career
- Fields: economics
- Workplaces: Environmental Defense Fund
- Thesis: Contracts and tradeable permit markets in international and domestic environmental protection (1995)

Suzi Clare Kerr (born 1966) is a New Zealand economist. She joined Environmental Defense Fund in 2019 as its chief economist.

== Biography ==
After completing a BSc at Canterbury University and a PhD at Harvard University, she started Wellington-based non-profit economic and public policy research institute, 'Motu Economic and Public Policy Research'. The New Zealand Emissions Trading Scheme work has been a strong focus.

Kerr is also an adjunct professor at Victoria University of Wellington's Climate Change Research Institute.

She has appeared frequently in the mainstream New Zealand media, primarily explaining economic aspects of issues in the news, such as the New Zealand Emissions Trading Scheme

In February 2016, Kerr was part of a group of three presenters in the keynote opening session of the Aspiring Conversations Festival called "Cool it! Dealing with Climate Change", which was held in Wānaka.

In 2018, Kerr was announced as a member of the Interim Climate Change Committee.

== Selected works ==
- Partnership for Market Readiness; International Carbon Action Partnership. 2016. Emissions Trading in Practice : A Handbook on Design and Implementation. World Bank, Washington, DC. (Member of six-person lead author team at Motu Economic and Public Policy Research and Environmental Defense Fund, including Ruben Lubowski and Gernot Wagner.)
- Newell, Richard G., James N. Sanchirico, and Suzi Kerr. "Fishing quota markets." Journal of Environmental Economics and Management 49.3 (2005): 437–462.
- Kerr, Suzi, and Richard G. Newell. "Policy‐Induced Technology Adoption: Evidence from the US Lead Phasedown." The Journal of Industrial Economics 51.3 (2003): 317–343.
- Cramton, Peter, and Suzi Kerr. "Tradeable carbon permit auctions: How and why to auction not grandfather." Energy policy 30.4 (2002): 333–345.
- Pfaff, Alexander SP, et al. "The Kyoto protocol and payments for tropical forest:: An interdisciplinary method for estimating carbon-offset supply and increasing the feasibility of a carbon market under the CDM." Ecological Economics 35.2 (2000): 203–221.
