= Judy Corbalis =

New Zealand writer

Judy Corbalis is a novelist and short story writer from New Zealand.

She graduated from the University of East Anglia in 1991. She serves on the advisory council of the UK Friends of the National Museum of Women in the Arts.

== Bibliography ==
- The Wrestling Princess and other stories (1986)
- The Cuckoo Bird (1988)
- Oskar and the Ice-pick (1988)
- Porcellus, the Flying Pig (1988)
- The Ice Cream Heroes (1989)
- Your Dad's a Monkey (1989)
- Flying Pig to the Rescue (1991)
- Put a Sock in It, Percy (1994)
- Tapu (1996)
- Mortmain (2007)
