= Sarona Aiono-Iosefa =

Samoan New Zealander (born 1962)

- Born: 18 November 1962 (age 63); Christchurch, New Zealand
- Occupation: Author

Sarona Meata'a Aiono-Iosefa (born 18 November 1962) is a Samoan New Zealander who writes children's fiction.

== Biography ==
Aiono-Iosefa was born in Christchurch, New Zealand to parents who had emigrated from Samoa. She studied journalism at Wellington Polytechnic then transferred to the University of Canterbury to study English literature, graduating in 1984.

Aiono-Iosefa's writing reflects her experiences growing up as a Pacific Islander in Christchurch. She has written several books for children which have been published in English and six different Pacific languages.

In 2007, Aiono-Iosefa was the recipient of the Fulbright-Creative New Zealand Pacific Writer in Residence at the Centre of Pacific Islands Studies at the University of Hawai'i at Manoa.
