= Sarah Campion (writer) =

UK-born author (1906–2002)

Mary Rose Alpers (née Coulton; 1 June 1906 – 22 July 2002) was a novelist, reviewer, journalist, teacher, radio broadcaster and social activist who wrote under the pseudonym Sarah Campion.

== Life ==
Campion was born in England in 1906, the daughter of a prominent Cambridge academic George Gordon Coulton and Rose Dorothy Ilbert. She attended Winceby House School for Girls, Great Shelford, Cambridge, a boarding school and a Teacher Training College at Clapham from which she passed with honours in 1929. In her twenties she travelled extensively in Europe. From 1933 until 1937 she taught English in Berlin. After being ousted from Germany when she refused to identify her Jewish students, she travelled and lived in South Africa, Canada, Scotland, USA, New Zealand and Australia.

Her experiences in Berlin and later in South Africa were instrumental to a life-long dedication to political activism which included protesting the fascists during the Spanish Civil War, the 1950s Aldermaston marches, Springbok and anti-Vietnam war protests. She was particularly active in anti-racism movements and was a co-founder of two racial equality associations in New Zealand.

She lived in Australia from 1938 to 1939. During this time she spent 8 months working as a cook in the Atherton Tablelands of northern Queensland. She returned to London due to the war and worked on the Blitz platform shelters of the London underground. In 1943 she travelled to Canada to care for her parents. Campion worked in a library and a steam laundry while in Toronto. She returned to London the following year.

In 1945 she met her future husband Antony Alpers, a New Zealander who wrote the biography of Katherine Mansfield. They settled in Auckland in 1952, but divorced in 1962. Campion continued to write and travel until 1994, when she suffered a stroke. She made New Zealand her primary home until her death in 2002. Her oral history is held by Auckland City Libraries.

== Writing career ==
Campion adopted a pseudonym based on the names of her grandmother and a favourite Elizabethan poet Thomas Campion. This pseudonym was used for all of her writing except for two early articles in Cambridge Review in 1931.

Although Campion only lived in Australia for a short period, she wrote six novels set in the northern outback. These novels are largely satirical and she is best known for the Burdekin trilogy including Mo Burdekin, Bonanza and The Pommy Cow. "Campion's satire blazes away, not just at the hard economic targets of colonisation, capitalism, patriarchy, legal processes and war, but also at the softer idealism of Utopian socialism, religion and romantic love."

Dale Spender described her achievement in The Penguin Anthology of Australian Women Writers, "Her impressively detailed and perceptive account of Australian northern life is even more remarkable given the relative shortness of her stay; the power of the continent, and the puny and painful nature of human existence, are starkly portrayed in her Australian novels and leave an indelible imprint."

Most of Campion's writing was done under difficult circumstances including the Blitz period of World War II, caring for her parents and while holding several jobs. Campion published 13 books including a biography of her father, and an early account of Britain's National Health Service. While all her novels were published by 1951, Campion continued to write reviews, history, diaries, letters to the editor, and autobiography into her later years. Her column for six years in the 1950s for the New Zealand magazine Home and Building were collected into I live here now in 2000. This collection of articles reveals a perceptive woman well ahead of her time.

== Selected works ==
=== Non-fiction ===
- Father: a portrait of G. G. Coulton at home (1948)
- National baby (1950)
- I live here now (2000)

=== Fiction ===
- If She is Wise (1935)
- Duet for Female Voices (1936)
- Cambridge Blue (1937)
- Thirty Million Gas Masks (1937)
- Unhandsome Corpse (1938)
- Turn Away No More (1940)
- Makeshift (1940)
- Mo Burdekin (1941)
- Bonanza (1942)
- The Pommy Cow (1944)
- Dr Golightly (1947)
- Come Again (1951)
