= Hilda Rollett =

NZ teacher, journalist and writer

Hilda Rollett (1873–1970) was a New Zealand teacher, journalist and writer. She was born in Auckland, New Zealand in 1873.
