= Linda Olsson =

Swedish-born New Zealand novelist

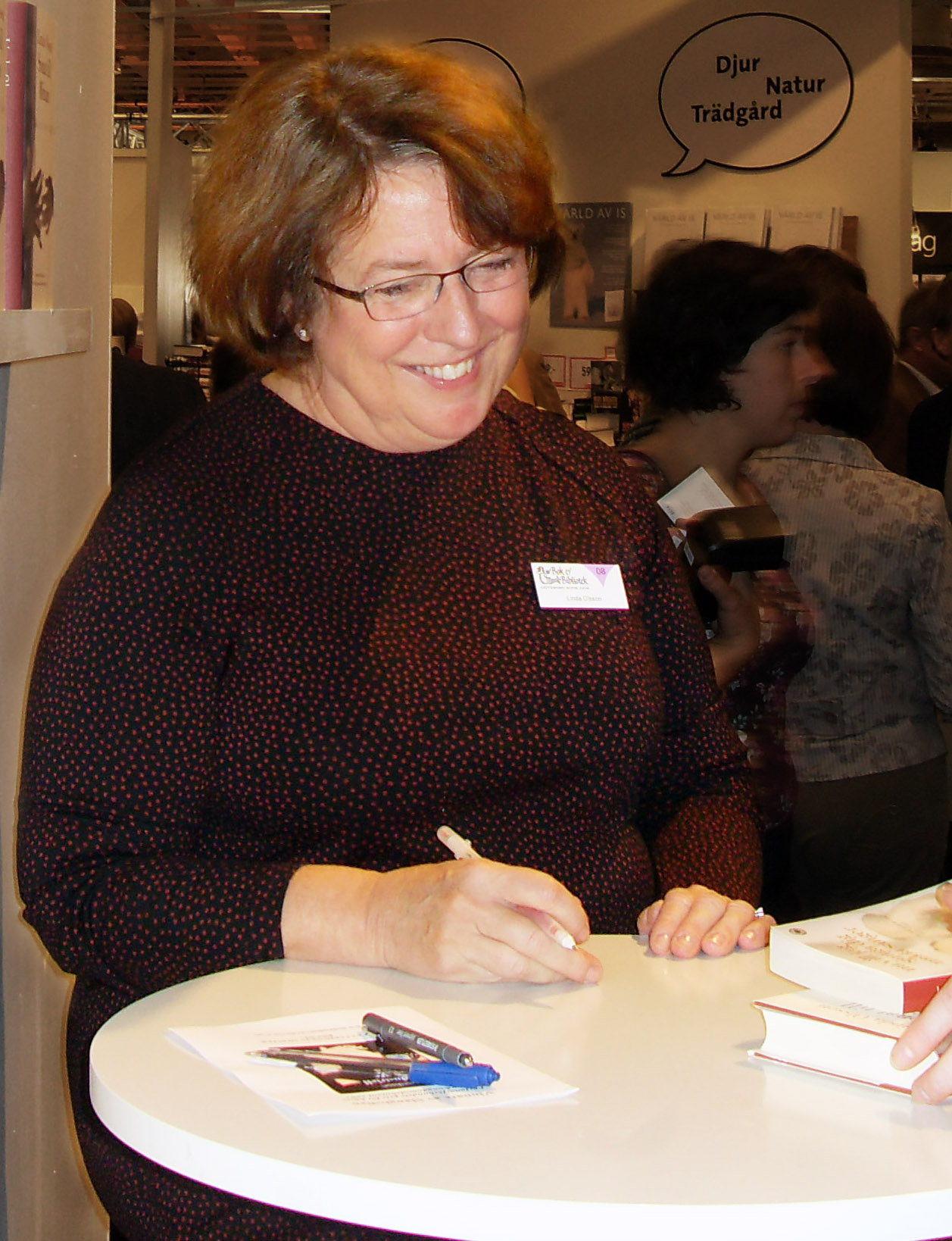
Linda Olsson at the Gothenburg Book Fair, 2008

Linda Olsson (born 1948) is a Swedish-born novelist who lives in Auckland, New Zealand. Published in 2005, her first novel Let Me Sing You Gentle Songs, an international best seller, has been translated into 15 languages. She writes in both English and Swedish.

== Biography ==
Born in Stockholm in 1948, Olsson was raised there by working-class parents. After graduating in law from the Stockholm University, she worked in banking and finance, married and gave birth to three sons. In 1986, the family left Sweden for Kenya where Olsson initially intended to take up a post, but they travelled on to Singapore, Britain and Japan, finally settling in New Zealand in 1990. She continued her studies at the University of Wellington, graduating in English and German literature.

Olsson had first followed a course in creative writing in London which encouraged her to write short stories. After arriving in New Zealand, she won a short story competition run by the Sunday Star Times in 2003. She is a graduate of the Master of Creative Writing programme at the University of Auckland, studying with Witi Ihimaera.

In 2005 she completed her first novel Let Me Sing You Gentle Songs (later reprinted as Astrid and Veronika in 2007) which was published in 25 countries. In Sweden, it became a best seller. Her subsequent novels: Sonata for Miriam (2009), The Kindness of Your Nature (2011), and The Blackbird Sings at Dusk (2016) have also been international successes. She completed her fifth novel, A Sister in My House, in April 2016.

Under the pen name Adam Sarafis, she has also collaborated with Thomas Sainsbury on the thriller Something is Rotten (2015).

== Publications ==
- Olsson, Linda. Let Me Sing You Gentle Songs. 2005. Penguin Books NZ. Republished as Astrid and Veronika. Penguin Books 2007. ISBN 978-1-101-53694-0
- Olsson, Linda. Sonata for Miriam: A Novel. 2009. Penguin Books. ISBN 978-1-4406-8801-0
- Olsson, Linda. The Kindness of Your Nature. 2011. Penguin Books. ISBN 9780143566069. Republished as The Memory of Love. Penguin Books 2011. ISBN 978-0-14-312243-2
- Olsson, Linda. The Blackbird Sings at Dusk. 2016. Penguin Books. ISBN 978-1-74348-711-2
