= Avice Maud Bowbyes =

New Zealand home science lecturer and writer

Avice Maud Bowbyes (29 May 1901 – 29 December 1992) was a New Zealand home science lecturer and writer. She was born in Kaikōura, Marlborough, New Zealand on 29 May 1901.
