= Pip Desmond =

New Zealand author and journalist

- Occupations: Author, journalist
- Writing career
- Language: English
- Genre: Non-fiction
- Notable works: Trust: A True Story of Women & Gangs
- Notable awards: NZSA E.H. McCormick Best First Book of Non-Fiction Award Winner

Pip Desmond is a New Zealand author and journalist.

Desmond attending St Mary's College in Wellington. Desmond graduated in 2006 from the International Institute of Modern Letters at the Victoria University of Wellington with an MA in Creative Writing.

Desmond has worked as an editor and journalist and in 2000 became press secretary to Labour Minister Ruth Dyson.

In 2011 Desmond published Trust: A True Story of Women & Gangs about her time as a member of Aroha Trust, a work cooperative for gang women in Wellington. In 2010, the book won the NZSA E.H. McCormick Best First Book of Non-Fiction Award Winner at the New Zealand Post Book Awards.

As part of the New Zealand Ministry for Culture and Heritage’s 'From Memory' programme, Desmond conducted interviews with Korean War veterans and compiled her research in the book The War That Never Ended: New Zealand Veterans Remember Korea.

Desmond and her husband Pat Martin own the communications company 2write.
