= Linda McNabb =

New Zealand writer

Linda McNabb (born 16 August 1963) is a British-born New Zealand children's author who has written several fantasy novels for children and young adults.

== Biography ==
McNabb was born in Rutland, England on 16 August 1963. She moved to New Zealand five years later and lives in Auckland. Her 2002 book The Dragon’s Apprentice was a finalist in the 2003 New Zealand Post Children's Book Awards. The Dragon’s Apprentice was also named as a Storylines Notable Junior Fiction Book.

== Bibliography ==
- And the winner is... (2001)
- Dragon's Apprentice (2002)
- The Puppet Master (2003)
- The Stonekeeper's Daughter (2004)
- The Seventh Son (2005)
- Circle of Dreams: Runeweaver (2005)
- Mountains of Fire (2006)
- The Crystal Runners (2006)
- Valley of Silver (2007)
- The Shadow Hunters (2007)
- Circle of Dreams: Timeweaver (2007)
- Dragons' Bane (2008)
- Circle of Dreams: Starweaver (2008)
