= Debbie Hay =

New Zealand academic

Debbie Hay FRSNZ
- Born: Deborah Lucy Hay
- Education: Imperial College London
- Scientific career
- Fields: molecular pharmacology
- Workplaces: University of Auckland; University of Otago
- Thesis: Investigation of the calcitonin receptor-like receptor and receptor activity modifying proteins (2002)

Deborah Lucy Hay FRSNZ is a New Zealand academic. In 2022, she was elected a Fellow of the Royal Society Te Apārangi.

== Academic career ==
After an undergraduate in pharmacology at the University of Sheffield, Hay did a PhD in molecular pharmacology entitled 'Investigation of the calcitonin receptor-like receptor and receptor activity modifying proteins' at Imperial College London. Hay moved to the University of Auckland, where she rose to full professor. She is now a full professor at the University of Otago and is a Fellow of the British Pharmacological Society.

Her research involves molecular pharmacological techniques to investigate phenomenon such as migraines. In 2016 she was awarded a James Cook Research Fellowship to investigate the causes and potential new treatments for migraines.

In 2022, Hay was elected a Fellow of the Royal Society Te Apārangi. According to the Royal Society, Hay's "seminal contributions have enhanced understanding of the roles of G protein-coupled receptors (GPCRs) in conditions such as migraine, diabetes and obesity." The Society added that "she has established herself as a world leader in a complex field, in high demand internationally as a collaborator, speaker, writer and consultant to industry."

== Selected works ==
- Bailey RJ, Walker CS, Ferner AH, Loomes KM, Prijic G, Halim A, Whiting L, Phillips AR, Hay DL. "Pharmacological characterization of rat amylin receptors: implications for the identification of amylin receptor subtypes." Br J Pharmacol 2012 May;166(1):151-67.
- Bailey RJ, Hay DL. "Agonist-dependent consequences of proline to alanine substitution in the transmembrane helices of the calcitonin receptor." Br J Pharmacol. 2007 Jul;151(5):678-87.
- Dakin, C. L., I. Gunn, C. J. Small, C. M. B. Edwards, D. L. Hay, D. M. Smith, M. A. Ghatei, and S. R. Bloom. "Oxyntomodulin inhibits food intake in the rat." Endocrinology 142, no. 10 (2001): 4244–4250.
- Hay, Debbie L., David R. Poyner, and Patrick M. Sexton. "GPCR modulation by RAMPs." Pharmacology & Therapeutics 109, no. 1 (2006): 173–197.
- Hay, Debbie L., George Christopoulos, Arthur Christopoulos, David R. Poyner, and Patrick M. Sexton. "Pharmacological discrimination of calcitonin receptor: receptor activity-modifying protein complexes." Molecular Pharmacology 67, no. 5 (2005): 1655–1665.
- Hay, Debbie L., Stephen G. Howitt, Alex C. Conner, Marcus Schindler, David M. Smith, and David R. Poyner. "CL/RAMP2 and CL/RAMP3 produce pharmacologically distinct adrenomedullin receptors: a comparison of effects of adrenomedullin22–52, CGRP8–37 and BIBN4096BS." British Journal of Pharmacology 140, no. 3 (2003): 477–486.
- Walker, Christopher S., Alex C. Conner, David R. Poyner, and Debbie L. Hay. "Regulation of signal transduction by calcitonin gene-related peptide receptors." Trends in Pharmacological Sciences 31, no. 10 (2010): 476–483.
