= Kirsten Moana Thompson =

New Zealand writer

- Born: Auckland, New Zealand
- Education: University of Auckland (BA, MA); NYU (PhD)
- Scientific career
- Fields: Film Studies and Visual Culture
- Workplaces: Wayne State University; Victoria University of Wellington; Seattle University (Current)
- Website: www.seattleu.edu

Kirsten Moana Thompson (born 1964) is an interdisciplinary scholar of American and New Zealand/Pacific cinema and visual culture. Thompson's work in American film has focused on classical American cel animation and the introduction of three strip Technicolor, on contemporary crime films and blockbuster and special effects cinema. Her work on Pacific cinema situates film production by American and Pacific filmmakers in broader cultural and visual contexts. She has also published on American horror film and German cinema.

== Education and career ==
Thompson's training in history, literature and media has shaped her interdisciplinary research and teaching. Thompson received her MA in English literature with First Class Honors from Auckland University, New Zealand and her PhD from New York University's Tisch School of the Arts in 1998 in Cinema Studies. She worked as Film Director and associate professor of Film Studies at Wayne State University in Detroit for several years. She then moved to New Zealand to take up the Directorship of the Film Program and was Professor of Film Studies at the School of English, Theatre, Film and Media Studies at Victoria University of Wellington, New Zealand. She is currently Professor of Film Studies and Director of the Film Program at Seattle University.

== Career ==
Thompson's first sole authored book, Apocalyptic Dread: American Film at the Turn of the Millennium, examined a series of films made in the late nineties and first decade of the new century through Søren Kierkegaard's concept of dread, situating millennial cinema in philosophical, theological and cinematic traditions of anxieties about the future. Through her readings of certain films like Cape Fear (Martin Scorsese, 1991) and Candyman (Bernard Rose, 1992), Thompson offered new philosophical explanations for the long-standing cultural popularity of horror and apocalyptic cinema. Thompson's next book, Crime Films: Investigating the Scene, examined case studies of the crime, criminal and crime solver situating the detective film and crime stories within historical developments in criminology, the police force and forensic investigation. Reflecting her increasing interest in wider social and historical aspects of visual culture, her work considers the emergence of visual technologies of identification and corporeal mapping, linking them to policing, social control, and the emergence of modern identity.

Thompson's scholarly research continues her work on American cinema and visual culture with a particular focus on classical and contemporary American animation and Color studies. She is currently working on a book Color, Classical American Animation and Visual Culture which explores the historical, philosophical, and technological dimensions of colour in the cel animation of Walt Disney, the Fleischer Bros., MGM and other leading American animation studios.

== Books ==
- Perspectives on German Cinema (Coeditor with Terri Ginsberg) NY: G.K.Hall, 1996.
- Apocalyptic Dread: American Film at the Turn of the Millennium. Albany: SUNY Press, 2007.
- Crime Films: Investigating the Scene: London: Wallflower, 2007.
