= Hedda Dyson =

New Zealand journalist and magazine editor

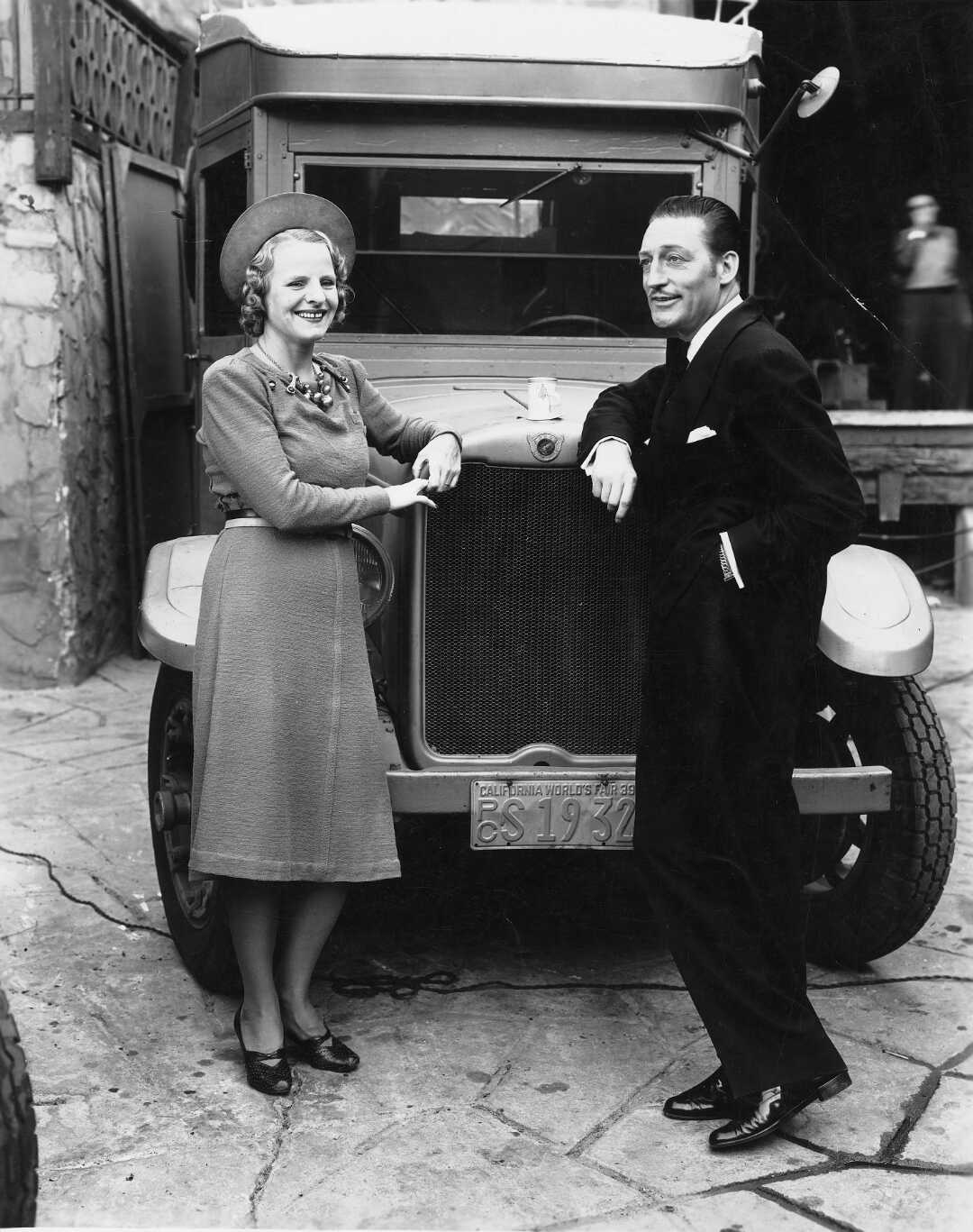
Hedda Dyson with Warren William

Elizabeth Geertruida Agatha Dyson (née Weersma, 15 January 1897 – 17 October 1951), known as Hedda Dyson, was a New Zealand journalist and magazine editor. She was born in Ginneken, Netherlands, which is now part of Breda, on 15 January 1897.
