= Louisa Alice Baker =

Journalist and novelist (1856–1926)

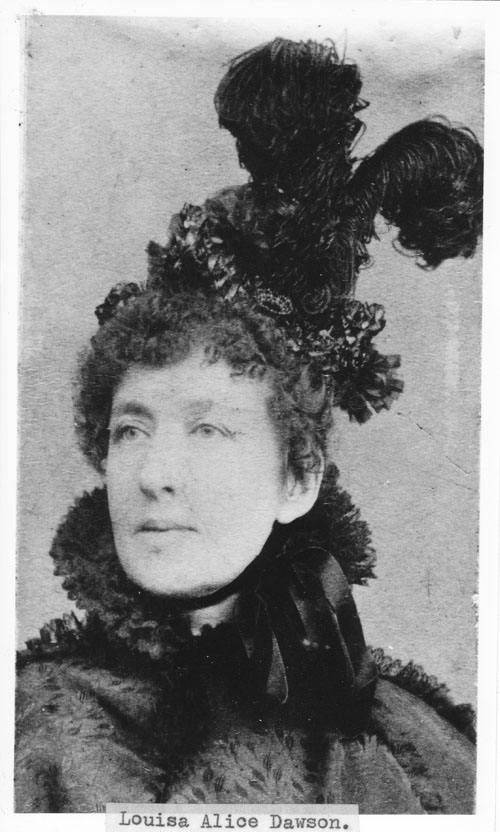
- Born: Louisa Alice Dawson; 13 January 1856; Aston, Warwickshire, England
- Died: 22 March 1926 (aged 70); Deal, Kent, England
- Other names: Mrs. Louis Alien Baker; Louisa Alien Baker; Alien; Dot; Alice
- Occupations: Journalist and novelist

Louisa Alice Baker (pen names, Mrs. Louis Alien Baker, Louisa Alien Baker, and Alien; 13 January 1856 – 22 March 1926) was an English-born New Zealand journalist and novelist.

== Early years ==
Louisa Alice Dawson was born in Aston, Warwickshire, England, on 13 January 1856. When she was seven years old, her family immigrated to Lyttelton, New Zealand.

== Career ==
In 1874, she married John William Baker and they had two children, John William Walter Baker and Ethel Elizabeth Baker She used several pen names for the different aspects for her career. When writing the children's column for the Otago Witness, she was known as "Dot" and used the name "Alice" when writing for the Otago Witness women's column. She continued to write for the Witness after she moved to England in 1894. After her move to England, Louisa wrote novels under the name "Alien" and continued to write popular articles until her death in 1926 as a result of burns from a stove fire in her home.

In 1886, Baker moved with her children to Dunedin, New Zealand, to work for the Otago Witness as writer. Initially, she began working as a writer for a women's column. She then began to write the children's column first called "Letters From Little Folk", which later became known as "Our Little Folks" and finally "Dot's Little Folks". She would respond to children's questions and write short stories.

At some point in 1893, Baker left New Zealand to publish her first novel in England. Due to her many pen names, her novels can be found under many names, which include: Louisa Alice Baker, Mrs. Louis Alien Baker, Louisa Alien Baker, and Alien. Most of her novels are credited to "Alien". Her first novel A Daughter of the King was published in 1894, followed by The Majesty of Man : a novel (1895), In Golden Shackles (1896), The Untold Half (1899), The Devil's Half-acre (1900) Another Woman's Territory (1901), His Neighbour's Landmark (1907), and A Maid of Mettle (1913). Baker began writing a column for the Otago Witness again in 1903 called "Alien's Letter from England". She wrote for them until her death in 1926. She died, aged 70, in Victoria Hospital, Deal, Kent, following an accident at her home the previous day.
