= Mary Woodward =

Miss New Zealand 1949

Mary Daphne Woodward (3 July 1928 – 14 July 2024) was the winner of Miss New Zealand in 1949, a women's rights activist, an environmentalist and writer.

== Biography ==
Woodward was born in Sāmoa and grew up in Taranaki, New Zealand.

=== Pageantry ===
When Woodward was 21, she signed up to compete for Miss New Plymouth to pay for her university fees, as the prize was £200 (nearly $20,000 NZD). Although she won, the winning money was not cash but rather a ticket to enter the preliminaries for Miss New Zealand.

When Woodward competed, Miss New Zealand fundraised to memorialize people who flew in the Royal New Zealand Air Force in World War II. After winning Miss New Zealand, she was flown to Europe and spoke to people affected by World War II as an ambassador for the Royal Air Forces Association. After her trip, she returned to Auckland where she resumed her studies. Woodward described what she did abroad in an interview, saying:

My function was to go round the different branches of the Royal Air Force Association and provide a focus for entertainment – it could be morning coffee at a small village place, it could be a ball or a party or whatever – but it was in an attempt to bring those men and women who had been in the service, bring them together for a bit of fun and get them re-communicating with each other.

=== Life after pageantry ===
After returning from Europe, Woodward continued her studies at the University of Auckland, where she received a Bachelor of Arts in 1951. She credited Silent Spring by Rachel Carson and having children as her reasons for pursuing environmental activism.

Woodward was featured as part of the exhibition Hina: Celebrating Taranaki Women held in Puke Ariki in New Plymouth in 2018.

== Personal life ==
During WWII, Woodward's brother served in the army and her sister was in the Women's Auxiliary Air Force.

Woodward married and divorced Peter Swinburn. They had four children together.

Woodward died in New Zealand on 14 July 2024.

== Writing ==
- The Bethells of Te Henga. Eureka Research. (1988).
- The Scent of Rosewater, initially written by her daughter, Anne Woodward Swinburn, about her life in Iran. It was incomplete upon Anne's death and Woodward finished it posthumously. Penguin Random House. (1998).
- The landscape of my heart: the Bethells and their neighbours. (2004).
- Shimmer Sea: What Ever Happened to Miss New Zealand 1949. (2018). A memoir.
- Waitakere's West Coasters. (2021).
