= Brenda Chawner =

New Zealand library academic

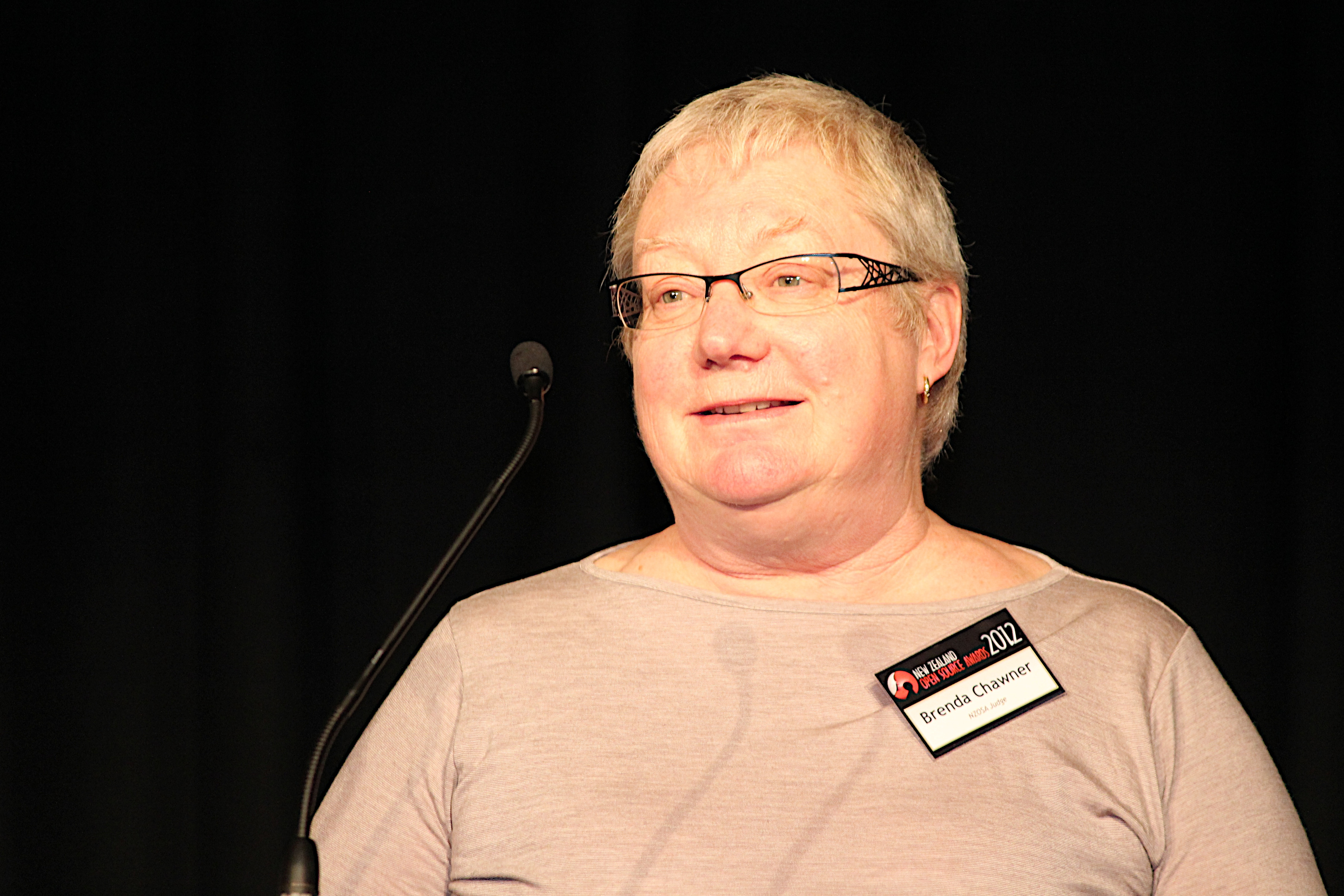
- Brenda Chawner at the New Zealand Open Source Awards 2012 ceremony in Wellington on 7 November 2012
- Education: Victoria University of Wellington
- Scientific career
- Workplaces: Victoria University of Wellington
- Thesis: Factors Influencing Participant Satisfaction with Free/Libre and Open Source Software Projects (2011)
- Website: University homepage

Brenda Chawner is a Canadian-New Zealand library academic specialising in the intersection between librarianship and information technology.

After a BA and MLS at the University of Alberta in Canada, she did a PhD at Victoria University of Wellington in New Zealand on the use of free and open source software in libraries. The thesis was an early example of the release of academic outputs under a Creative Commons license.

Chawner worked at the National Library of New Zealand as a systems analyst and later as a lecturer at Victoria University of Wellington.

Between 2011 and 2017, Chawner was the editor of The New Zealand Library and Information Management Journal. In 2012, she won a LIANZA Fellowship. In 2012 and 2014 she was a judge at the New Zealand Open Source Awards. Chawner is credited with bringing Richard Stallman to New Zealand in 2009.

Chawner retired from Victoria in 2019.

== Works ==
- Cullen, Rowena, and Brenda Chawner. "Institutional repositories, open access, and scholarly communication: a study of conflicting paradigms." The Journal of Academic Librarianship 37, no. 6 (2011): 460–470.
- Chawner, Brenda. "Millennium intelligence: Understanding and conducting competitive intelligence in the digital age." Online Information Review (2001).
- Chawner, Brenda, and Paul H. Lewis. "WikiWikiWebs: New ways to communicate in a web environment." Information technology and libraries 25, no. 1 (2006): 33.
