= Elizabeth Gard'ner =

NZ home science teacher, administrator, writer

Elizabeth Anne Gard'ner (née Milne; 24 December 1858 – 5 June 1926) was a Swedish-born New Zealand home science teacher, administrator, and writer.

Elizabeth Anne Milne was born in Allerum, Sweden. She is regarded as the pioneer of home science education in New Zealand.
