= Catherine Lucy Innes =

New Zealand writer

Catherine Lucy Innes (c.1840 – 28 April 1900) was a New Zealand writer. She was born in London, England in c.1840.

She was buried at Karori Cemetery.
