= Katherine Mansfield House and Garden =

Historic house in New Zealand

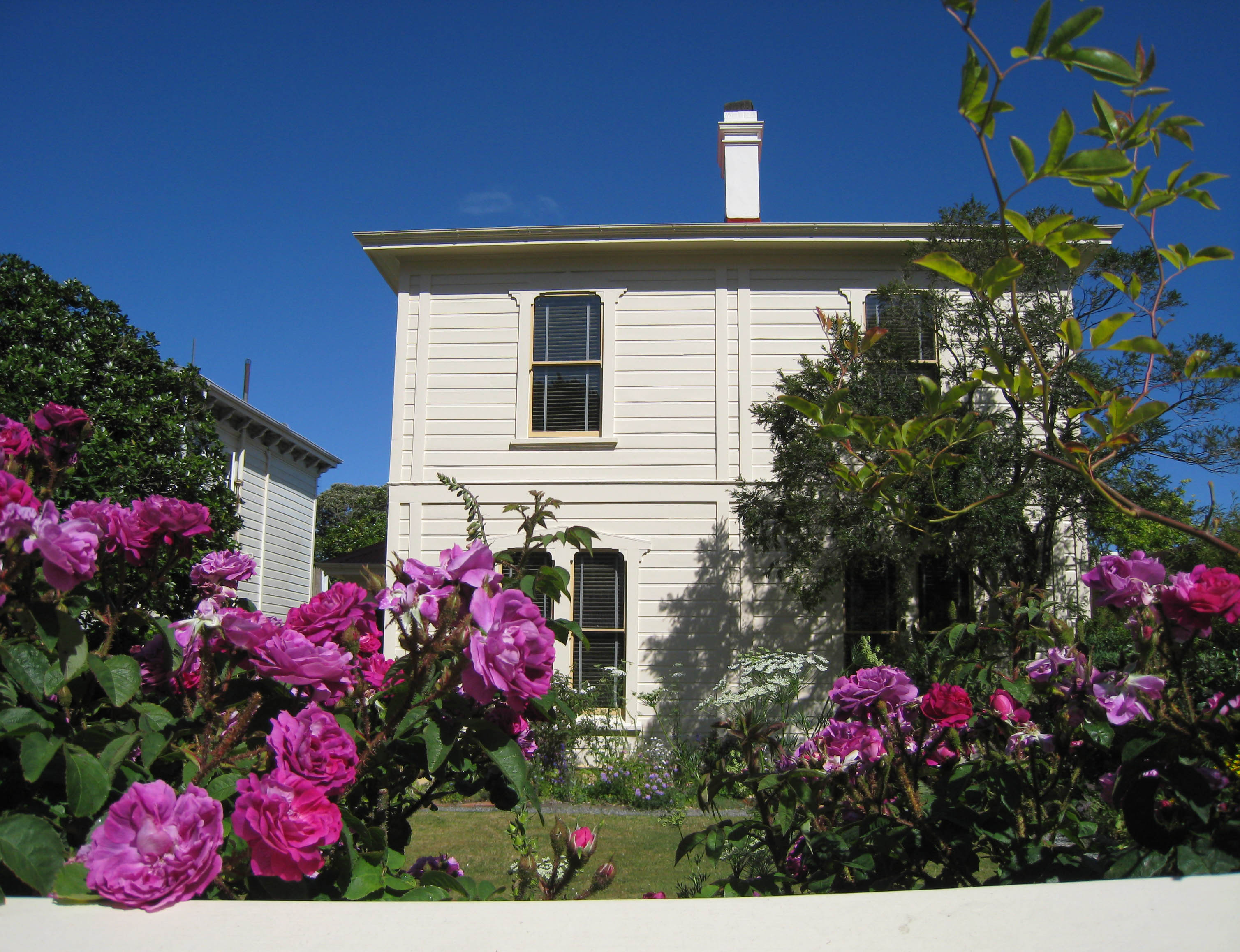
- Katherine Mansfield House and Garden in Thorndon, Wellington

General information
- Architectural style: Italianate
- Location: 25 Tinakori Road, Wellington (number 11 before 1908), New Zealand
- Coordinates: 41.270164°S 174.77992°E
- Construction started: 1887
- Cost: £400
- Client: Harold Beauchamp

Website
- http://www.katherinemansfield.com

Heritage New Zealand – Category 1
- Designated: 11-Jul-1986
- Reference no.: 4428

Katherine Mansfield House and Garden (formerly known as Katherine Mansfield Birthplace) was the early childhood home of Katherine Mansfield, a prominent New Zealand author. The building, located in Thorndon, Wellington, is classified as a Category 1 Historic Place by Heritage New Zealand.

== Construction and layout ==
The house was built during an economic depression in 1888 for Mansfield's father, Harold Beauchamp, and was most likely built to a builder's plan. The site was leasehold. Conditions of the lease required any house on the site to be placed more than 10 feet (3.0 m) from Tinakori Road and of a value exceeding £400. The freehold belonged to the then new baronet, Sir Charles Clifford.

The two-storey house measures 9.1 metres (30 ft) wide and 12.1 metres (40 ft) long. The ground or lower floor has a drawing room, dining room, bathroom, kitchen, scullery, and lean-to. On the first or upper floor there are four bedrooms and a night nursery.

The original wallpaper and the ceramics recovered through archaeological excavations both illustrate Katherine's mother's interest in Europe's aesthetic movement.

== History ==
Mansfield's family moved into the house in 1888. She was born on October 14, a few months after the move. The initial occupants were her parents; her two sisters, Vera and Charlotte; two aunts, Belle and Kitty, from her mother's side; and her grandmother, Mrs Dyer. With a servant also on the premises, the living space was crowded. 11-week-old Gwendoline died of cholera in 1891, one of 104 epidemic deaths that year. The city had many deaths from infectious diseases like typhoid from the mid-1880s because of poor sanitation with sewage collected in open drains to the harbour.

The Beauchamp family moved in 1893 to a more spacious house in then-rural Karori, Chesney Wold. Harold wrote that the shift was made "for the benefit not only of the children's health but also my own." They returned to Thorndon in 1898 to 75 Tinakori Road (Note: Wellington houses were re-numbered in 1908. 11 Tinakori Road became 25 Tinakori Road and 75 Tinakori Road became 133 Tinakori Road. Re-numbering the City The Evening Post, 24 September 1908, page 8) opposite the junction with George Street. About 1907, they moved to 47 Fitzherbert Terrace, then moved to The Grange in Wadestown in 1916. Katherine's mother died in the spring of 1918 and her father remarried in January 1920.

Mansfield drew on memories of her childhood home in her short stories "Prelude" (and subsequent novel, The Aloe); "A Birthday"; "The Doll's House", and "The Wind Blows". Mansfield described the house as "[a] dark little cubby hole" and "[a] horrid little piggy house".

=== Other residents ===
Harold Beauchamp owned the house until 1929. While there were many occupants and families in the house during this period, the most notable was Dr. Frederick Truby King, founder of the Plunket Society. He lived in the house from 1921 to 1924, during which time he was appointed the Director of Child Welfare in the Department of Health.

The house was sold to Edward Pearce, grandson of the leading businessman and briefly Wellington MP of the same name. State Highway 1 passes beneath the back of the house deep in a trench. (Note: ". . . beyond the yard a deep gully filled with tree ferns . . ." The Aloe) Once detailed planning began in the 1950s, this house and its surroundings, along with much of this select part of Thorndon, suffered "motorway blight". Wellington writer/journalist Pat Lawlor wrote of the apparently run-down state of this house and the condition of Chesney Wold, their Karori house in 1958 (both then divided into flats).

== Katherine Mansfield Birthplace Society ==
The Katherine Mansfield Birthplace Society was founded in 1986, by art historian Oroya Day, Peter Young, and the architect James Beard. The Society purchased the property in 1987, following the death of the 91-year-old former resident, Mrs Edward Pearce in 1985. In the late 1980s, the society restored the house to its original condition, undertaking considerable research and relying on Mansfield's own descriptions as well as photographs and "archeological and architectural analyses". The house and its garden are significant cultural attractions in Wellington.
