= Something Childish =

1924 collection of short stories Katherine Mansfield

First edition (publ. Constable & Co.)

Something Childish and Other Stories is a 1924 collection of short stories by the writer Katherine Mansfield. It was published in America as The Little Girl.

This anthology was published after her death by her husband John Middleton Murry. Murry wrote in his introductory note that most of the stories in this collection were written between In a German Pension (1911) and Bliss and Other Stories (1920) with the exception of six stories – the first four were written before In a German Pension was published, while "Sixpence" and "Poison" were written after Bliss.

== Stories ==
1. "The Tiredness of Rosabel" (1908)
2. "How Pearl Button Was Kidnapped" (1912)
3. "The Journey to Bruges" (1911)
4. "A Truthful Adventure" (1911)
5. "New Dresses" (1912)
6. "The Woman at the Store" (1912)
7. "Ole Underwood" (1913)
8. "The Little Girl" (1912)
9. "Millie" (1913)
10. "Pension Séguin" (1913)
11. "Violet" (1913)
12. "Bains Turcs" (1913)
13. "Something Childish But Very Natural" (1914)
14. "An Indiscreet Journey" (1915)
15. "Spring Pictures" (1915)
16. "Late at Night" (1917)
17. "Two Tuppenny Ones, Please" (1917)
18. "The Black Cap" (1917)
19. "A Suburban Fairy Tale" (1919)
20. "Carnation" (1918)
21. "See-Saw" (1917)
22. "This Flower" (1920)
23. "The Wrong House" (1919)
24. "Sixpence" (1921)
25. "Poison" (1920)
