= At the Bay =

1922 short story by Katherine Mansfield

- Short story by Katherine Mansfield

Publication
- Published in: London Mercury
- Publication date: January 1922

"At the Bay" is a 1922 short story by New Zealand author Katherine Mansfield. It was first published in the London Mercury in January 1922 in twelve sections, and later reprinted in The Garden Party and Other Stories (1922) with a short descriptive coda which is now the thirteenth section. The story represents Mansfield’s best mature work, a luminous example of her literary impressionism. While writing it at the Chalet des Sapins in Montana (now Crans-Montana), Switzerland, she was coming to terms with her relationship with her husband John Middleton Murry and with her own origins and identity.

Along with Prelude, The Doll's House and The Garden Party she uses her childhood in what are her most famous New Zealand stories, stories which display her talent at its most commanding and indescribable. She saw them as part of a “novel” to be called Karori (after the suburb she grew up in) and having two story cycles about the Burnell family and the Sheridan family.

== Plot summary ==
I
The shepherd is with his dog on Crescent Bay.
II
Stanley Burnell goes for a swim early morning, and Jonathan Trout is there; the two men wanted to be the first in the water, and Jonathan expresses sympathy for Stanley.
III
Aunt Beryl tells Kezia not to play with her food. Stanley leaves for work, to the women's relief.
IV
Out in the countryside, Kezia helps Lottie with the stile to Isabel's disapproval. The Samuel Josephs children are said to be rowdy and they don't play with them any more. Then they come upon Rags and Pip, and the latter shows them an "emerald" he has found in the sand.
V
At the beach, Aunt Beryl joins Mrs Kember, of whom Mrs Fairfield disapproves. Beryl gets changed in front of her friend.
VI
Linda is alone in the bungalow. She thinks back of when she was living in Tasmania with her parents, of how her father said they would go down a river in China, of how her father agreed on her marrying Stanley whom she loves for being soft underneath the veneer. Her baby boy comes along and she says she feels no motherly love for him; he keeps on smiling, then plays with his toes.
VII
After a description of the seashore, Mrs Fairfield and Kezia are taking an afternoon nap in the bungalow. The grandmother is thinking of Uncle William, one of her sons who died of sunstroke while working as a miner; Kezia asks her if she is sad, then attempts to make the grandmother promise never to die.
VIII
Alice visits Mrs Stubbs in town; the latter shows her photographs, then talks about how her husband died of dropsy, and adds that 'freedom is best'.
IX
Kezia, Lottie and Isabel are playing a card game similar to 'snap' with Pips and Rag in the washhouse. Uncle Jonathan turns up to take the boys home.
X
Before picking up the boys, Uncle Jonathan meets Linda in the garden. She is charmed by him. He confesses to loathing his job but believes he lacks the willpower to change his life.
XI
Stanley comes back and apologises profusely for not saying goodbye to Linda in the morning. He has bought gloves for himself.
XII
Aunt Beryl is worried about being single and growing old alone; Harry Kember turns up and asks her for a walk; at first she goes along with him, but repudiates his advances when his intentions become clear.
XIII
A brief description of the bay.

== Characters ==
- The Shepherd
- Stanley Burnell
- Linda Burnell
- (Uncle) Jonathan Trout, likes music and books; he is the leader of the church choir.
- Aunt Beryl
- Mrs Fairfield
- Kezia
- Isabel
- Lottie
- The Samuel Josephs children
- Pip, a cousin of the Burnells
- Rags, a cousin of the Burnells. Pip and Rags are the Trout boys.
- Mrs Harry Kember; an eccentric who smokes heavily and likes to play bridge
- Gladys, Mrs Kember's servant, whom she calls Glad-eyes
- Mrs Stubbs, who runs a shop near the beach; a friend of Alice.
- Mr Harry Kember
- Alice, the housekeeper
