= Aloe (disambiguation) =

Aloe is a genus of succulent plants, which includes several species:

- Aloe arborescens, krantz aloe
- Aloe camperi
- Aloe vera, "true aloe", cultivated for agricultural and medicinal use
- Aloe wildii

Aloe may also refer to

- Aloidendron, a genus formerly included in Aloe, known as tree aloes
- Aristaloe, a genus formerly included in Aloe
- Agarwood, also known as "aloeswood", or "lign-aloes"
- A.L.O.E. ("a Lady of England"), pen name of Charlotte Maria Tucker (1821-1893)
- The Aloe, a 1930 novel by Katherine Mansfield
- Aloe Blacc, stage name for American singer-songwriter, rapper and producer

== See also ==
- Aloe Ridge Game Reserve, in Gauteng, South Africa
- List of Aloe species
