= Rangitaiki =

Rural locality in Bay of Plenty, New Zealand

- Rural community
- Interactive map of Rangitaiki
- Coordinates: 38.877°S 176.365°E
- Country: New Zealand
- Region: Bay of Plenty
- Territorial authority: Taupō District
- Ward: Taupō East Rural General Ward
- Electorates: Taupō; Waiariki (Māori)

Government
  - Territorial authority: Taupō District Council
  - Regional council: Bay of Plenty Regional Council
  - Mayor of Taupō: John Funnell
  - Taupō MP: Louise Upston
  - Waiariki MP: Rawiri Waititi
- Postcode(s): 3379

Rangitaiki is a rural community in the Taupō District and Bay of Plenty Region of New Zealand's North Island, located near the source of Rangitaiki River. State Highway 5 runs through it.

It is an area of "frost flats" near the southern end of the Kaingaroa Plains, in the North Island Volcanic Plateau. European explorer and botanist John Bidwill visited the plain in 1839 and author Katherine Mansfield described the unique landscape in The Woman at the Store. The main native plants on the frost flats are monoao (Dracophyllum subulatum) and silver tussock (Poa cita).

The area experiences temperature similar to Central Otago in the winter months. Scrub fires sometimes occur in summer, including natural fires started by lightning and quickly doused by rain.

The settlement includes a country tavern and a school.

== Demographics ==
Rangataiki statistical area covers 996.27 km^{2} (384.66 sq mi) and had an estimated population of 130 as of June 2025, with a population density of 0.13 people per km^{2}.

Historical population
Year	Pop.	±% p.a.
2006	162	—
2013	135	−2.57%
2018	132	−0.45%
2023	123	−1.40%

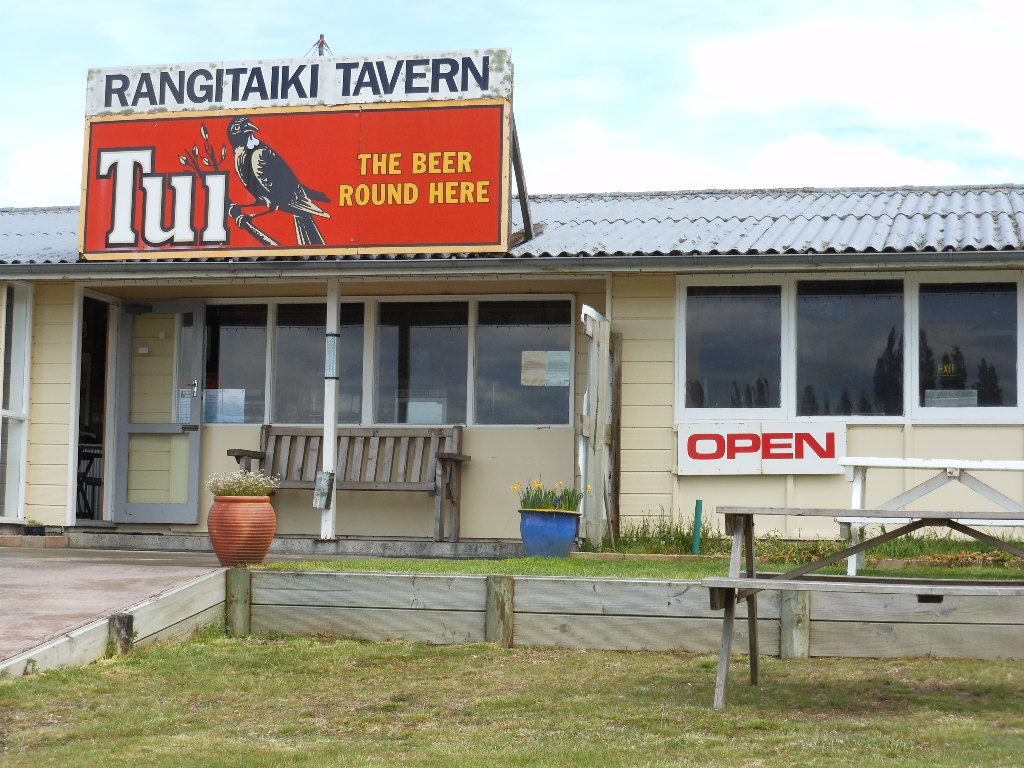
Rangitaiki Tavern

Rangataiki statistical area had a population of 123 in the 2023 New Zealand census, a decrease of 9 people (−6.8%) since the 2018 census, and a decrease of 12 people (−8.9%) since the 2013 census. There were 69 males and 54 females in 69 dwellings. 2.4% of people identified as LGBTIQ+. The median age was 30.8 years (compared with 38.1 years nationally). There were 24 people (19.5%) aged under 15 years, 33 (26.8%) aged 15 to 29, 60 (48.8%) aged 30 to 64, and 6 (4.9%) aged 65 or older.

People could identify as more than one ethnicity. The results were 82.9% European (Pākehā), 24.4% Māori, 9.8% Asian, and 4.9% other, which includes people giving their ethnicity as "New Zealander". English was spoken by 100.0%, Māori by 2.4%, and other languages by 7.3%. No language could be spoken by 4.9% (e.g. too young to talk). The percentage of people born overseas was 14.6, compared with 28.8% nationally.

Religious affiliations were 26.8% Christian, and 2.4% Hindu. People who answered that they had no religion were 65.9%, and 4.9% of people did not answer the census question.

Of those at least 15 years old, 18 (18.2%) people had a bachelor's or higher degree, 54 (54.5%) had a post-high school certificate or diploma, and 24 (24.2%) people exclusively held high school qualifications. The median income was $60,900, compared with $41,500 nationally. 9 people (9.1%) earned over $100,000 compared to 12.1% nationally. The employment status of those at least 15 was 72 (72.7%) full-time and 9 (9.1%) part-time.

== Education ==
Rangitaiki School is a co-educational state primary school, with a roll of 13 as of July 2026. Its roll is one of the smallest in New Zealand. The school was established by 1932.
