= Narrative hook =

Narrative technique

A narrative hook (or just hook) is a literary technique in the opening of a story that "hooks" the reader's attention so that they will keep on reading. The "opening" may consist of several paragraphs for a short story, or several pages for a novel, and may even be the opening sentence.

== Common formats with examples ==
Opening a novel with startling, dramatic action or an ominous description can function as a narrative hook. Ovid's Fasti employs narrative hooks in the openings of each book, including a description of a bloody ghost and an ominous exchange between the characters Callisto and Diana.

A narrative hook can also take the form of a short passage showing an important event in the life of one of the work's characters. The device establishes character voice and introduces a theme of the work. In Anna Quindlen's Black and Blue, the opening sentence recounts the first time the protagonist endured abuse from her husband, which is the core theme of the novel. Opening lines that introduce an important event without providing specifics, such as "And then, after six years, she saw him again." from Katherine Mansfield's A Dill Pickle, pique the reader's curiosity and encourage the reader to discover the answers later in the work.

The in medias res technique, where the relating of a story begins at the midpoint, rather than at the beginning, can also be used as a narrative hook. Toni Morrison's Beloved begins in medias res and transitions to a description of the house that serves as the novel's setting, disrupting the reader's expectations of a typical narrative structure.

Often, instead of starting the story in the middle, the author will give the reader a taste of an intriguing part of the story and then continue the story from the chronological beginning. This is accomplished by explaining or implying a unique situation without explaining how it was encountered (e.g., “I once accidentally bought a horse.” or "There is only one person I wish death upon."). In more elaborate form, a frame story can contain explicit statements ("This is the most inexplicable thing to happen to me") and explicit promises ("I would never have believed that such commonplace events would result such consequences"), and raise the question why the listeners wish to hear what is told, all of which promise more intriguing events ahead. This can also serve as a form of procatalepsis, by putting the reader's doubts into the story as the fictional listener's.

One method of creating a hook, is by explaining the significant impact of a specific detail without explaining the detail itself. This encourages the audience to listen until they learn the aforementioned detail. For example, "The people in Rio have something that New Yorkers don’t, which is why I moved." Here the listeners will want to know what the people of Rio have.

A thematic statement, as with the opening line of Jane Austen's Pride and Prejudice ("It is a truth universally acknowledged, that a single man in possession of a good fortune, must be in want of a wife."), can also serve to hook the reader's attention.

== In film ==
In film, the hook is what grabs the viewer's attention, preferably in the first 5–10 minutes, as a reader might expect to find a literary hook in the first chapter of a novel.

During the pitch process, a screenwriter will use a hook to prove the "bankable" quality of their screenplay.

Knowing the importance of a good hook, many screenwriters write their hooks first. Conceivably, the life of a screenplay might evolve from hook to 1-page synopsis, to 4-page treatment, to full treatment, to scriptment, to screenplay.

One can briefly state a good hook in one or two sentences, introducing the protagonist, the conflict that drives the story, and what the protagonist will achieve with either triumph or defeat. The "hook" is the viewer's own question of whether the conflict can be resolved, so a screenwriter might want to test the hook by turning it into a question. For example, "Johnny must catch the murderer so that he can get the girl" might become "Will Johnny catch the murderer? Or will he lose the girl?" In this way, the screenwriter can use the hook as a tool when writing the screenplay.

In web videos, a hook typically shows an exciting scene from a video right at the beginning to grab viewers' interest. This technique is used by popular YouTubers such as MrBeast.

== See also ==
- Cold open
- Headline
- Lead paragraph
