= The Fly (Mansfield short story) =

1922 short story by Katherine Mansfield

"The Fly" is a 1922 short story by Katherine Mansfield.

Mansfield wrote the story in February 1922 at the Victoria Palace Hotel in Montparnasse, Paris. It was first published in The Nation and Athenaeum on 18 March 1922 and in The Doves' Nest and Other Stories in 1923.

The story relates to the death of a soldier in World War I. In October 1915, Mansfield's younger brother, Leslie Beauchamp, was killed during a grenade training drill while serving with the British Expeditionary Force in Ypres Salient, Belgium. He was 21. Like the soldier in the story, before enlisting Leslie had worked for his father's firm. Leslie and Mansfield's father Harold Beauchamp owned an importing company.

== Plot summary ==
Mr. Woodifield, an old and rather infirm gentleman, is talking to his friend, referred to only as "the boss". The boss is a well-to-do man who is "still going strong", despite being five years older than Woodifield. The boss enjoys showing off his redecorated office to him, and points out its new furniture and electric heating. There is an aged picture of a young man, whom we learn is the boss's deceased son, sitting above a table, but it is not referred to by the boss.

Woodifield wants to tell the boss something, but is struggling to remember what it is, when the boss offers him some fine whisky. After drinking, his memory is refreshed and Woodifield talks about a recent visit that his two daughters made to his son's war grave in Belgium, saying that they had come across the boss's son's grave as well. The reader now come to know that the boss's son had died in World War I six years ago, a loss that affected the boss heavily.

After Woodifield leaves, the boss sits down at his table to inform his clerk that he does not want to be disturbed. He is extremely perturbed at the sudden reference to his dead son, and expects to weep but is surprised to find that he cannot. He looks at his son's photo, and thinks it bears little resemblance to his son, as he looks stern in the photo, whereas the boss remembers him to be bright and friendly. The boss then notices a fly struggling to get out of the inkpot on his desk. The boss helps it out of the inkpot and observes how it dries itself. When the fly is dry and safe, the boss drops a blob of ink onto it. He admires the fly's courage and drops another dollop of ink. He watches the fly dry itself again, although with less vigor than the first time. By the third drop, the fly has been severely weakened, and dies.

The boss throws the dead fly, along with the blotting paper that was underneath it for his cruel game, into the wastepaper basket. He asks his clerk for fresh blotting paper. The boss suddenly "feels a wretchedness that frightens him and finds himself bereft". He tries to remember what he had been thinking about before noticing the fly, but cannot recall his grieving for his son.

=== Characters in "The Fly" ===
- Mr. Woodifield, retired man who has lost a son in World War I.
- The boss, who also lost his son in World War I. (main character)
- Macey, the main office clerk.
- The fly, the symbolic device of the story.
- Gertrude, one of the daughters of Woodifield.
- Reggie, the son of Woodifield who died in World War I.
