= Pat Lawlor (writer) =

New Zealand journalist, editor (1893–1979)

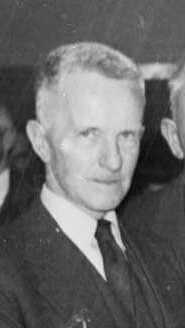
Lawlor in 1955

Patrick Anthony Lawlor OBE (12 February 1893 – 19 January 1979) was a New Zealand journalist, editor, bibliophile, writer and Catholic layman. He was born and died in Wellington, New Zealand.

In 1958, he urged the restoration of Katherine Mansfield's birthplace, which had been then divided into two rundown flats but is but now preserved as the Katherine Mansfield House and Garden.

In the 1976 New Year Honours, Lawlor was appointed an Officer of the Order of the British Empire, for services to literature and the community.

== Selected bibliography ==
- Confessions of a Journalist (1935)
- The House of Templemore (1938)
- The Mystery of Maata (1946)
- Books and Bookmen, New Zealand and Overseas (1954)
- Old Wellington Days (1959)
- More Wellington Days (1962)
- The Two Baxters: Diary Notes on their Friendship (1979)
