= Millie (short story) =

1913 short story by Katherine Mansfield

- Short story by Katherine Mansfield
- Country: New Zealand
- Language: English
- Genre: Modernist fiction

Publication
- Published in: The Blue Review
- Publication type: Magazine
- Media type: Print
- Publication date: June 1913

"Millie" is a 1913 short story in the Modernist, stream-of-consciousness style by Katherine Mansfield. It was first published in The Blue Review in June 1913, and was one of the first stories published by Mansfield. It was reprinted in her 1924 collection Something Childish and Other Stories.

== Plot summary ==
Millie, the wife of a labourer in a rural farming community, waits alone in her house, while her husband and the other men of the village go in search of Harrison, an Englishman who has supposedly shot and killed a neighbour, Mr Williamson. After speculating on the eventual lynching of the suspect, then thinking about her own childlessness and looking at her wedding pictures in Mount Cook, Millie hears a noise coming from the garden and finds a wounded man lying there. She is both alarmed and touched by the man's plight, but seeing that he is very young – really not much more than a boy – she decides to help him. The wounded man asks when the other men are due to return, and Millie realizes that this is Harrison, the suspected murderer. Millie tends to Harrison's injuries and hides him, promising herself fiercely that he will go free, regardless of justice or authority.

The men return home. Millie is anxious, knowing Harrison is still in hiding nearby. During the night, a neighbour's dog barks, alerting Millie's husband, Sid, who sounds the alarm, in spite of Millie's attempt to dissuade him. At first, Sid believes that someone is stealing livestock, but soon recognizes Harrison, who is making his escape on Sid's horse. Sid and the other two men set off on foot in pursuit of the fugitive. Millie runs out into the street in a state of heightened excitement, barefoot and in her nightdress, feeling "a strange mad joy" at the chase. Millie's final words are ambiguous: in spite of her earlier protectiveness towards the hunted man, she urges Sid to shoot him, shrieking and dancing barefoot in the dust.
