= A Cup of Tea =

- Short story by Katherine Mansfield

Publication
- Published in: The Story-Teller
- Publication date: May 1922

"A Cup of Tea" is a 1922 short story by Katherine Mansfield. It was first published in The Story-Teller in May 1922. It later appeared in The Doves' Nest and Other Stories (1923). Her short stories first appeared in Melbourne in 1907, but literary fame came to her in London after the publication of a collection of short stories called In a German Pension.

The character Rosemary Fell is a "fictional reconstruction" of Mansfield's wealthy first cousin, once removed, the writer Elizabeth von Arnim.

== Plot summary ==
Rosemary Fell, a wealthy young married woman, goes to Curzon Street to shop at a florist's and an antique shop (in which she admires, but does not buy, a beautifully painted small ceramic box). Before going to the car, Rosemary is approached by Miss Smith, a poor girl who asks for enough money to buy tea. Instead, Rosemary drives the girl to her plush house, determined to show her "that dreams do come true" and "that rich people did have hearts." At the Fells' home, Miss Smith eats her fill of food and tea. She then begins to tell Rosemary of her life until Rosemary's husband, Philip, comes in. Although initially surprised, Philip recovers and asks to speak to Rosemary alone.

In the library, Philip conveys his disapproval. When Rosemary resists dismissing Miss Smith, Philip tries another, more successful, tactic: he plays to Rosemary's jealousy and insecurity by telling her how pretty he thinks Miss Smith is. Rosemary retrieves three five-pound notes and, presumably, sends the girl away (a far cry from Rosemary's first vow to "look after" and "be frightfully nice to" Miss Smith). Later, Rosemary goes to her husband and informs him that "Miss Smith won't dine with us tonight." She first asks about the antique box from the morning, but then arrives at her true concern, quietly asking Philip, "Am I pretty?" The story ends with this question.

== Major topics ==
- Class consciousness
- Feminism
- Materialism
- Insecurity
- Jealousy

== Allusions ==
- Rosemary decides to help the poor woman as she feels inspired by stories by Dostoevsky that she has been reading.

== Adaptations ==
An adaptation of "A Cup of Tea", directed by Shyam Benegal, was included in the Indian television series Katha Sagar in 1986.

The story was read by Emilia Fox, as part of the BBC Radio 4 The Montana Stories, broadcast January 2019. This was a series of readings of four short stories written by Mansfield when she lived in the Montana region (now Crans-Montana) of Switzerland between May 1921 and January 1922, and later from June to August 1922.
