= How Pearl Button Was Kidnapped =

1912 short story by Katherine Mansfield

"How Pearl Button Was Kidnapped" is a 1912 short story by Katherine Mansfield. It was first published in Rhythm in September 1912 under the pen name of Lili Heron. It was republished in Something Childish and Other Stories (1924).

== Plot summary ==
Pearl Button is playing outside whilst her mother is ironing clothes. Two Māori women go up to her and ask her to come with them. After a long walk they arrive at a Māori settlement, where the little girl is given a fruit to eat. Then they drive towards the seaside. Pearl has never seen the sea; they play about. Suddenly, a crowd of policemen runs toward them to take Pearl away again.

== Characters ==
- Pearl Button
- two Māori women
- more Māori people
- family[mom]*
- police*

== Major themes ==
- Māori culture : the story is written from the child's perspective, who takes to Māori culture right away. However, she is scared by the white men coming to pick her up.

== Literary significance ==
The text is written in the modernist mode, without a set structure, and with many shifts in the narrative.
