= The Canary (short story) =

1923 story by Katherine Mansfield

- Short story by Katherine Mansfield
- Country: United Kingdom
- Language: English

Publication
- Publisher: The Nation and Atheneum
- Publication date: 21 April 1923

"The Canary" is a short story by Katherine Mansfield. It was first published posthumously in The Nation and Atheneum on 21 April 1923, and later appeared in The Doves' Nest and Other Stories (1923).

Mansfield began writing the story at the Victoria Palace Hotel in Paris in 1922, where a woman who lived opposite the hotel kept canaries in a cage. She finished the story on 7 July 1922, when she and her husband John Middleton Murry were living at a hotel in Randogne (now part of Crans-Montana), Switzerland, from 4 June to 16 August 1922. It was the last short story she ever completed.

== Plot summary ==
The story is told in the first person by a lonely woman. She discusses her pet canary who has died at an unspecified time in the past. She gives him some anthropomorphic characteristics, describing his personality and his habits, and the companionship he provided her with. She discusses her three lodgers, who she overhears mockingly calling her "the scarecrow".
