= An Indiscreet Journey =

1915 short story by Katherine Mansfield

"An Indiscreet Journey" is a short story written in 1915 by Katherine Mansfield.

It was first published posthumously in Something Childish and Other Stories (1924).

== Plot summary ==
An English woman is traveling to the French front line during the First World War to see her French lover who is the 'Little Corporal'. She is pretending to be going to see her uncle and aunt (two paid actors). She encounters two old women on her train journeys, the first is kind, but the second (nicknamed seagull because of an incongruous fake seagull perched upon her hat) is cunning and perceptive, asking pointed questions, knowing her real purpose in France. The narrator and her lover spend much time in an inn where soldiers drink mirabelle and contemplate their lives and futures. There are few intimate moments shown between the narrator and the little corporal, but one can discern that he is her lover from small details such as his putting his hand over hers, and catching her passport when they are shut alone in a room. The two take rather inconspicuous roles in the latter stages of the story, and the two most prominent roles are the blue-eyed soldier and 'Blackbeard' (a nickname given for similar reasons as 'seagull').

== Characters ==
- the English girl
- the concierge, compared to St Anne
- the Commissaire of Police
- the woman sitting opposite her on the train
- Madame Grinçon, a friend of the Boiffards
- the corporal
- Aunt Julie
- Uncle Paul
- Madame, the owner of the café
- the waiting-boy in the café, with a strident voice
- soldiers
- a weedy man, who walks into the café
- the woman at the Café des Amis

== Various points ==
- The childish perception of the narrator (big boys = soldiers, red cross tents are like festive marquees)
- The subtle relationship between the narrator and the little corporal
- The location is unknown (X,Y,Z)
- One of the few short stories Mansfield wrote on war and thus the style differs hugely from others
- The story is based on her journey in February 1915 through the French war zone to spend four nights with her lover the French writer Corporal Francis Carco near Gray. The Germans first used Chlorine gas on 22 April 1915 at Ypres, and as Mansfield was at Carco's flat in Paris on 8/9 May she may have seen a gassed French soldier in a café then. The narrator Raoul Duquette of her story Je ne parle pas français (who has a cynical attitude to love and sex) is partly based on Carco.

== Literary significance ==
The text is written in the modernist mode, without a set structure, and with many shifts in the narrative.
