= Bliss (short story) =

1918 short story by Katherine Mansfield

- Short story by Katherine Mansfield
- Genre: Modernist short story

Publication
- Published in: English Review
- Publication date: August 1918

"Bliss" is a modernist short story by New Zealander writer Katherine Mansfield, first published in 1918. It was published in the English Review in August 1918 and later reprinted in Bliss and Other Stories.

== Plot summary ==
The story follows a dinner party given by Bertha Young and her husband Harry.

The story starts with Bertha in a blissful mood as her party approaches, as she considers the specialness and unconventionality of her mood. The maid has prepared a colourful fruit tray for the party, which Bertha will arrange. The nanny is feeding the baby, who reluctantly lets Bertha hold her. The moment of connection with her daughter brings her more bliss.

After a phone call from her husband, who is running late, Bertha thinks ahead to who will attend the party that evening. A couple, Mr. and Mrs. Norman Knight (close friends to Bertha and Harry), Eddie Warren, a neurotic and sought-after writer, and Pearl, a strange, mysterious young woman that Bertha has taken a liking to after meeting at a club. As she prepares the drawing room cushions, Bertha recalls how Harry has declared that he finds Pearl dull. She is sure there is much more to her. Her feeling of bliss continues as she hugs the cushions and looks over the balcony to a most perfect blossoming pear tree in the garden, which she imagines "as a symbol of her own life." She lists to herself some of the many aspects of her life she is grateful for, and finds that her outfit is even reminiscent of the tree.

As the guests start to arrive, with Mr and Mrs Norman Knight calling each other nicknames and Eddie complaining about his taxi, she notes their outfits and appreciates how attractive the company is. As Harry arrives late, she considers the charm of her husband's eccentricities. Pearl is the last to arrive and, as Bertha takes her arm to lead her to the dining room, she feels an intense yet unspoken intimacy with her guest.

With everyone present, the meal begins. Compliments are paid regarding the food as theatre is discussed, and Bertha is overcome again by a sense of bliss, delighting in the company she has chosen. She thinks of the perfect pear tree in the moonlight in the garden, as she wonders how she can feel so connected to Pearl. She is somehow sure that Pearl must be feeling the same.

After dinner, when Pearl asks Bertha whether she has a garden, Bertha interprets the question as a sign of connection and leads her to the garden window. There, she draws back the curtains to reveal the pear tree. The two women stand side by side, observing it together in a quiet moment of apparent understanding, before the lights are turned on and the moment comes to an end.They rejoin the group for coffee, cigarettes, and more lively conversation. Bertha thinks about how her husband is being quite rude to Pearl, which upsets Bertha. She decides that she will try to find a way to explain to him what she and Pearl have shared, but also realises that soon the party will end. She fears she will be alone with just her husband but then, "for the first time in her life", finds that she is also filled with desire for him. She wonders if this ardent feeling is what all her bliss has been leading up to.

As the guests begin to leave to catch their trains and taxis, Harry goes to help Pearl with her coat in the hallway, which Bertha appreciates considering his earlier brusqueness. In the drawing room still, Bertha fetches a book for Eddie to borrow. As she turns her head to peer down the hallway she sees Pearl and Harry in a romantic embrace, secretly arranging to see each other the next day.

Not knowing they have been spotted, Pearl returns to the drawing room to say goodbye to Bertha and mentions the pear tree. As the final guests leave, Harry nonchalantly locks up behind them. Uncertain about the future, Bertha runs to her garden window and gazes upon her perfect tree, "as lovely as ever."

== Characters in "Bliss" ==
- Bertha Young - the main character, age 30
- Harry - Bertha's husband
- Little Bertha/Little B - Bertha's baby daughter
- Mary - servant
- Nanny - Little B's nurse
- Mr and Mrs Norman Knight - dinner guests
- Eddie Warren - a poet
- Pearl Fulton - a young, beguiling blonde woman
