= Charles Granville =

British publisher

Charles Granville (born Charles Hosken in Helston, Cornwall, 1867) was an English book publisher, publishing in the 1900s and early 1910s as Stephen Swift or Stephen Swift Ltd. He published two literary magazines, the Oxford and Cambridge Review and the Eye Witness, which carried works by "up and coming" literary authors, and also a third, Rhythm. In October 1912 he was wanted for embezzlement and bigamy, and fled the country. He was brought back, tried, and imprisoned for bigamy. His publishing company was liquidated.

Granville was dining at a London dinner party when a London magistrate (who said that he never forgot a face) asked him for a private word. The magistrate said that they were fellow guests that night, but next morning he would inform the authorities that some years earlier Granville had appeared before him for bigamy, was given bail, and absconded. Granville then fled to Algiers with his secretary and a large cheque from the Oxford and Cambridge Review. He was extradited for embezzlement, but subsequently charged only with bigamy, and was imprisoned although his wives were willing to give him testimonials as a good husband. The story was heard by Arthur Ransome from Ashley Dukes at the Garrick Club forty years later.

== Stephen Swift Ltd ==
Granville published literary and general books and magazines as Stephen Swift Ltd, from offices in St John Street, London; and may have used Stephen Swift as an alias. He was described as an “expansive, munificent sort of publisher”. and as a “wealthy entrepreneur and would-be poet” with “plenty of capital .... and a knack .... for making his authors feel that they were sitting at the centre of the universe”.

He published two magazines, the Oxford and Cambridge Review; and the Eye Witness. Works published in the Oxford and Cambridge Review included On Social Freedom by John Stuart Mill (posthumously, 1907), Milton and his Age by G. K. Chesterton (1909), The Machine Stops by E. M. Forster (1909), and Prince Roman by Joseph Conrad (1911).

The Eye Witness, later called the New Witness and then G. K.'s Weekly, was a literary and political periodical described as Catholic, radical and broadly tolerant, with a circulation of "over 100,000". It was edited by Hilaire Belloc and Cecil Chesterton. Belloc also wrote a series of booklets on British battles, starting with Blenheim, Malplaquet, Waterloo and Tourcoing. Other books Granville published included books by and about Henri Bergson, Katherine Mansfield's short story collection In a German Pension, and various novels, books of poems and belles lettres.

Arthur Ransome had left his previous publisher Martin Secker for Granville, who promised him better returns and a guaranteed and steady income. He recalled that Granville "had a magnificent way with him". He transferred his works of the last five years, including Bohemia in London and literary works on Edgar Allan Poe and Oscar Wilde. The work on Wilde went into eight editions; it had attracted public notoriety because of an (unsuccessful) libel case by Lord Alfred Douglas, who was by now a "vexatious" "semi-professional" (and indigent) litigant. Ransome had translated Une Nuit au Luxembourg by the French Symbolist poet and novelist Remy de Gourmont into English for Granville as A Night in the Luxembourg. His works held by Granville represented all his work worth republishing. When he heard on 8 October (from Cecil Chesterton) that Granville had fled and his company had gone into liquidation, Ransome went and sat in Granville's chaotic office day after day to establish his interest as a leading creditor of the bankrupt firm. He sacrificed control of some earlier works, but kept the most valuable, Poe and Wilde, which were subsequently taken over by Methuen; and a collection of essays, Portraits and Speculations which went to Macmillan.
