= Mr Reginald Peacock's Day =

1920 short story by Katherine Mansfield

"Mr Reginald Peacock's Day" is a 1920 short story by Katherine Mansfield. It was first published in the New Age on 14 June 1917, and later reprinted in Bliss and Other Stories.

== Plot summary ==
Reginald is woken up by his wife for breakfast. He is irritated by his wife who is very impolite with him. He has a bath, sings for a bit and fathoms he could be an opera singer. The couple then have a minor spat over the fact that she cooks for him, instead of having a servant doing it for them. After receiving a letter of admiration from Aenone Fell, he gives a lesson to Miss Brittle, then to the Countess Wilkowska, and to Miss Marian Morrow. He then goes to Lord Timbuck's party with his students for dinner. When he gets home he thinks his wife an ingrate for not celebrating his 'triumph', whilst it so happens that he did not even tell her he would be away for dinner.

== Characters ==
- Reginald Peacock, a singing teacher.
- His wife
- Adrian, Reginald's son.
- Aenone Fell, a student of Reginald's.
- Miss Betty Brittle, a student of Reginald's.
- The Countess Wilkowska, a student of Reginald's.
- Miss Marian Morrow, a student of Reginald's.
- Lord Timbuck

== Major themes ==
- Married life

== Literary significance ==
The text is written in the modernist mode, without a set structure, and with many shifts in the narrative.

== References to other works ==
- Reginald says George Meredith's poem Love in the Valley in his morning bath, though it is misquoted.
- He also refers to Richard Wagner's opera Lohengrin
- With the Countess Wilkowska, he sings John Dowland's song from The Third and Last Booke of Songs or Aires, though it is misquoted.
