= Something Childish But Very Natural =

- Short story by Katherine Mansfield
- Country: New Zealand
- Language: English
- Genre: Modernist fiction

Publication
- Published in: The Adelphi
- Publication type: Review
- Media type: Print
- Publication date: February 1924

"Something Childish But Very Natural" is a short story written by Katherine Mansfield in 1914. It was first published posthumously in the Adelphi. It was republished in Something Childish and Other Stories (1924).

== Plot summary ==
At a train station, Henry looks at books and comes upon Samuel Taylor Coleridge's poem. Then he jumps onto the train as he is late, and has left his portfolio behind. On the train, he starts talking to a girl, until she tells him she will be there again every evening. On the following Saturday, he goes to the station and sees her; they get on the train and start talking like old friends. Later, they go to a concert, and she appears somewhat distant. They walk down the streets of London and come upon a pretty village nearby. There, they visit a house and decide to rent it. Then Henry receives a telegram, and things fall apart.

== Characters ==
- Henry. He is almost 18 years old and works in an architect's office.
- Edna. She is 16 years old and goes to a training college to be a secretary. Her mother is Hungarian.

== Major themes ==
- Love
- Family
- The transitional period between childhood and adolescence
- The tension between fantasy and reality

== Literary significance ==
The text is written in the modernist mode, without a set structure, and with many shifts in the narrative.
