= Anne Estelle Rice =

American artist (1877–1959)

- Born: 1877; Conshohocken, Pennsylvania, United States
- Died: 1959 (aged 81–82)
- Education: School of Industrial Art of the Pennsylvania Museum, Pennsylvania Academy of the Fine Arts
- Known for: Painting, illustration of theatre costumes
- Notable work: The Egyptian Dancers (1910) Portrait of Katherine Mansfield (1918)
- Movement: Post-Impressionism, Fauvism
- Spouse(s): Raymond Drey (m. 1913)

Anne Estelle Rice (1877–1959) was an American artist who was one of the chief illustrators for the British periodical Rhythm, edited by John Middleton Murry and Michael Sadleir from 1911 to 1913. She established a close relationship with Katherine Mansfield, and famously painted her wearing red.

== Biography ==
=== Early life and education ===
Rice was born in Conshohocken, Pennsylvania in 1877 and grew up in Pottstown. She studied at the School of Industrial Art of the Pennsylvania Museum and studied there for three years from 1894 before going on to the Pennsylvania Academy of the Fine Arts where she studied sculpture and life drawing with Charles Grafly, William Merritt Chase and Thomas Anshutz. She began contributing illustrations to a number of magazines, including Collier's, Harper's, and the Saturday Evening Post.

=== Moving to Paris ===
In 1905 Rice went to Paris to illustrate the latest fashions for Philadelphia's North American magazine. In the summer of 1907 she met the Scottish painter John Duncan Fergusson who encouraged her to become a painter and with whom she began a relationship. Exposed in Paris to Post-Impressionism and Fauvism, she adopted a vivid palette and used red or blue contouring lines. From 1910 she began to use pure primary and secondary colours.

After showing her painting The Egyptian Dancers (1910), she was claimed by the American press as the leader of a new school of art.

In 1909, Rice was one of three artists invited by American merchant John Wanamaker to provide decorative murals for a new store that he was opening in Philadelphia. To make the work she had to take on a very large studio at 87 rue Denfert-Rochereau in Paris where she worked until the end of 1913 to produce seven panels depicting figures, mostly women, in classical garden settings. Rice's murals were removed when the store was remodelled in the mid-1950s, and were lost, presumed destroyed.

During this period, together with Fergusson, S.J. Peploe, and other members of the Fergusson circle, she exhibited at the Ashnur Gallery in Paris. She showed at the Salon d’Automne from 1908 through 1913, and at the Salon des Independents in 1911 and 1912. London's progressive Baillie Gallery gave Rice major exhibitions in 1911 and 1913. Her work was also included in salons of the Allied Artists Association in England.

In 1910, in the Café d'Harcourt, boulevard Saint-Michel, Rice and Fergusson met the publisher John Middleton Murry. He introduced them the following year to the New Zealand writer Katherine Mansfield. A lifelong friendship started from then on between Rice and Mansfield, who dedicated her 1912 short story "Ole Underwood" to her friend. Mansfield further expressed her admiration about Rice both as an artist and as a person. In a letter to Murry written in May 1912, she described the painter as "an exceptional woman – so gay, so abundant, in full flower just now" who, "when she is happy and working", "has great personal ‘allure’ – physical ‘allure’." Later, on December 26, 1920, she wrote to Rice:

"Whenever I examine things here – the lovely spring line of flowers and peach leaves par exemple, I realise what a marvellous painter you are – the beauty of your line – the life behind it."

Moreover, Rice and Fergusson became active collaborators in Murry's literary and arts quarterly Rhythm, in which Mansfield was assistant editor until June 1912. According to arts historian Roger Neill:

"The aesthetic concept of "rhythm" – harmony in nature, vigour and directness – provided the connective tissue, not only between two Scottish Colourists (Fergusson and Peploe, plus Rice), but also between the writers and artists involved with the magazine."

In 1912, Rice met the American author Theodore Dreiser in Paris and they became intimate friends and correspondents. Also in Paris in 1912 Rice met her future husband, the English art and theatre critic Raymond Drey. She spent August 1913 with J.D. Fergusson in Cassis, in the company of S.J. Peploe, his wife Margaret and their son Willy, but her relationship with Fergusson ended soon afterwards. Late in 1913 she married Drey, and the couple began to make their home in England. The First World War adversely affected Rice: many of the American art dealers and collectors who showed an interest in her work stopped buying pictures.

=== The Portrait of Katherine Mansfield ===
It's during the spring and summer 1918, when her close friend she met in Paris came to visit her at Looe in Cornwall, that Rice painted her famous portrait of New Zealand short story writer Katherine Mansfield. Mansfield had just been diagnosed with tuberculosis and she suggested herself to be painted in vivid red. Then she wrote a letter to her collaborator and newly-wed husband John Middleton Murry to share her experience as Rice's model:

A. came early and began the great painting — me in that red, brick red frock with flowers everywhere. It’s awfully interesting, even now. I painted her in my way as she painted me in hers: her eyes … little blue flowers plucked this morning.

Vicki Robson described Rice's Portrait of Katherine Mansfield as such:

There are no softened outlines, and contours are left boldly as literal lines at the jaw and ear, and around the figure’s left leg and hip. Rice was unconcerned with ‘finish’, and the raw canvas shows through in places, as does the under-drawing. Nor is there any of the fine detailing of face and hands found in conventional portraiture. Rice’s main concern was the integration of the figure with the background, and she achieved this by bringing the background forward, the repeating floral patterns of a jug of flowers, wallpaper — or maybe a patterned shawl — drawing attention to the surface.

The portrait was purchased in 1940 with T. G. Macarthy Trust funds and is now part of Te Papa's art collections in Wellington, New Zealand.

=== Exhibiting across the Western world ===
From the 1920s Rice painted still lifes, exhibiting at the Leicester Galleries and the Wildenstein Gallery in England. She kept up her visits to France, and sold paintings to collectors in the Netherlands, Denmark, France and Germany.

Rice was intensely interested in the theatre, often making theatrical costumes and sets the subjects of her drawings, and in the 1930s she designed the sets and costumes of several London operatic and dramatic productions.

== Collections of work ==
Rice's work is represented in numerous private collections in the United States and the United Kingdom, as well as in University of Hull Art Collection; Museum of New Zealand Te Papa Tongarewa in Wellington, New Zealand; and the Government Art Collection, England.
