= Her First Ball =

1921 short story by Katherine Mansfield

"Her First Ball" is a 1921 short story by Katherine Mansfield. It was first published in The Sphere on 28 November 1921, and later reprinted in The Garden Party and Other Stories.

== Plot summary ==
A young girl called Leila has come to the city to stay with her cousins. They are going to a ball. Leila is excited: this is her first ball. Once there, she is both excited and terrified. After dancing with several young boys her own age, she dances with a wrinkly balding man who has been coming to balls for a while. This spoils her mood until she dances with a good looking young gentleman where her worries disappear.

== Characters ==
- Leila, a cousin of the Sheridan Girls in The Garden Party. She is 18 years old.
- Lucas
- Tomas
- Meg
- Miss Eccles, Leila's dance teacher at boarding school.
- Jose
- The "Fat Man"
- the first partner
- the second partner
- the third partner
- the fourth partner
- the cab driver (just her imagination before the ball)
- teacher of History

== Literary significance ==
The text is written in the modernist mode, without a set structure, and with many shifts in the narrative. The main themes of the story are dramatically portrayed through Leila's reactions and her emotions.

== Footnotes ==
muiz khan
