= A Married Man's Story =

Unfinished 1923 short story by Katherine Mansfield

"A Married Man's Story" is an unfinished 1923 short story by Katherine Mansfield. It was first published in The Dial in January 1923, and was reprinted in the London Mercury in April 1923, and then in The Doves' Nest and Other Stories (1923). It was published posthumously and it is incomplete.

== Plot summary ==
After supper the narrator is thinking of what is going on outside the house, then his wife asks him what he is thinking about and he says nothing; she tucks the baby in and is alone in the kitchen.

Later, he is bored with the marriage but he cannot leave his wife because they are 'bound'. Then she comes into the living-room at 10:30pm as she does every night, and asks him to turn out the gas before going to bed. Yet on this particular night she also asks him if he is cold, which he thinks is absurd.

He then expresses his desire to write simply, 'sotto voce'.

He expounds how, after they got married in Wellington, he did not answer one of her questions, pretending he didn't hear it.

He then talks about his parents, and mentions a recollection of a woman coming into the chemist's shop in tears and rushing out after buying her medication. As a child, he thought that must be 'what it is outside'. He goes on to talk about school, and about the death of his mother, who said, upon her death, that she was poisoned by his father. Later, he mentions that his father had a mistress, and that, on one occasion, he felt some kind of moment of intense bond with life, alone in his room.

== Characters ==
- Husband
- Wife lonely
- Baby
- The narrator's father, a chemist.
- The narrator's mother, weakened and broken by childbirth, unable to leave her room up until her death.

== Major themes ==
- Relationships, especially marriage
- Writing

== Literary significance ==
The text is written in the modernist mode, without a set structure, and with many shifts in the narrative.
