= The Man Without a Temperament =

1920 short story by Katherine Mansfield

"The Man Without a Temperament" is a 1920 short story by Katherine Mansfield. It was first published in Arts and Letters in Spring 1920, and later reprinted in Bliss and Other Stories.

== Plot summary ==
Mrs Jinnie Salesby has tea with her husband, Robert. She receives a letter from Lottie, who is suffering from neuritis. In her letter, she explains it is snowing in London. Then The Honeymoon Couple come back from fishing. The Salesbys go for a turn; she stops and sits while he goes on for a longer walk. He comes upon the Countess and the General in a carriage; they spurn him. He then walks on, imagines he is going back home for dinner, with Dennis and Beaty as guests. Instead, he gets back to his wife and they return to the dining-room for dinner, with all the other couples.

== Characters ==
- Mr Robert Salesby
- Mrs Jinny Salesby; she suffers from a heart disease.
- The Two Topknots
- The American Woman, and her pet Klaymongso
- the servant-girl
- Antonio, a servant.
- Lottie
- The Honeymoon Couple
- The Countess
- The General
- Dennis
- Beaty
- Millie

== Major themes ==
- married life

== Literary significance ==
The text is written in the modernist mode, without a set structure, and with many shifts in the narrative.

== References to other works ==
- Alexander Pope's Satires, Epistles and Odes of Horace, Satire I, Book 2, is quoted.
