= Francis Carco =

French author and art critic

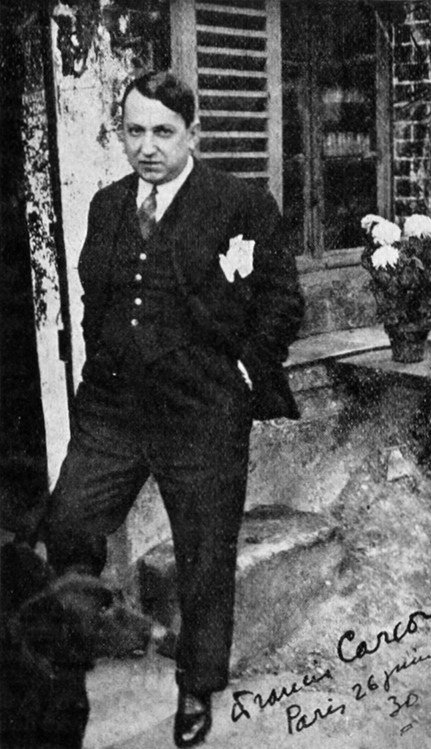
- Francis Carco c. 1930
- Born: François Carcopino-Tusoli; 3 July 1886; Nouméa, New Caledonia
- Died: 26 May 1958 (aged 71)
- Resting place: Cimetière de Bagneux, France
- Occupation: Author

Francis Carco (born François Carcopino-Tusoli) (3 July 1886 – 26 May 1958) was a French author, born at Nouméa, New Caledonia. He was a poet, belonging to the Fantaisiste school, a novelist, a dramatist, and art critic for L'Homme libre and Gil Blas. During World War I he became an aviation pilot at Étampes, after studying at the aviation school there. His works are picturesque, painting as they do the street life of Montmartre, and often being written in the argot of Paris. He has been called the "romancier des apaches." His memoir, The Last Bohemia: From Montmartre to the Latin Quarter, contains reminiscences of bohemian life in Paris during the early years of the 20th century.

He had an affair with the short story writer Katherine Mansfield in February 1915. The narrator Raoul Duquette of her story Je ne parle pas français (who has a cynical attitude to love and sex) is partly based on him, and her story An Indiscreet Journey is based on her journey through the war zone to spend four nights with Corporal Francis Carco near Gray. She saved as a memento of him a fake letter from "Julie Boiffard" asking her to visit (which is now held in the Turnbull Library). She also wrote a letter to her husband from Carco's Paris flat on 8/9 May 1915.

Carco held the ninth seat at Académie Goncourt from 1937 to 1958. He is buried in the Cimetière de Bagneux. He was the author of:

- Instincts (1911)
- Jésus-la-Caille (novel, 1914)
- Les Innocents (1917)
- Au coin des rues (tales, 1918, 1922)
- Les Malheurs de Fernande (sequel to Jésus-la-Caille, 1918)
- Les Mystères de la Morgue ou les Fiancés du IVº arrondissement. Roman gai (1918)
- L'Equipe (1919)
- La Poésie (1919)
- Maman Petitdoigt (1920)
- Francis Carco, raconté par lui-meme (1921; in the collection Ceux dont on parle, edited by Marc Saunier and published by R. Chiberre)
- Promenades pittoresques à Montmartre (1922)
- L'homme traqué (1922; Grand Prix du roman de l'Académie française)
- Vérotchka l'Étrangère ou le Gout du malheur (1923)
- Perversité (1925) (the English translation of this by Jean Rhys was mis-attributed to Ford Madox Ford under murky circumstances)
- Le Roman de François Villon (1926), a heavily fictionalised biography of the 15th-century poet
- La lumière noire (1934)
- Brumes (1935)
- Panam, prose-poem of Paris Madam, (1922; Librairie Stock): "Of all the pleasures, it is those of the night that I prefer, when the street glitters in the fog and around the corner in a cul-de-sac glows the red light with the three letters of that magnetic word: Bal."

== See also ==
- Grand prix du roman de l'Académie française
