= Psychology (short story) =

1920 short story by Katherine Mansfield

"Psychology" is a 1920 short story by Katherine Mansfield. It was first published in Bliss and Other Stories.

== Plot summary ==
A man visits a woman for tea. He tells her this is the only place he pays attention to in terms of its furniture and so on. He also loves her 'little boy'. They then talk about the state of the novel as a literary genre - coming to the conclusion that the psycho-novel is shoddy. She feels anguished about possibly having failed in not following suit with that genre however, and he leaves. He rings the bell, then a friend of hers comes along and whilst she would usually be annoyed by her, this time she puts her arm around her and entices her to come again soon. She then sets out writing about how she liked the talk on psychology with her friend.

Characters

female playwright male novelist the playwright's friend' an elderly virgin, a pathetic creature who simply idolized her

== Major themes ==
- friendship
- literary genres, particularly trends for novels, and the psychology-novel.
- Unspoken of/Hidden Love

== Literary significance ==
The text is written in the modernist mode, without a set structure, and with many shifts in the narrative.

== References to other works ==
- Lewis Carroll's Alice in Wonderland is alluded to through the phrase, 'a sandwich from the hatter's bag', i.e. Mad Hatter.
- The Book of Genesis is also alluded to concerning a rich cake that the female playwright serves.
