= Feuille d'Album (short story) =

1917 short story by Katherine Mansfield

"Feuille d'Album" is a 1917 short story by Katherine Mansfield. It was first published in the New Age on 20 September 1917, under the title of An Album Leaf. A revised version later appeared in Bliss and Other Stories.

== Plot summary ==
Ian French is a young artist who lives alone in Paris. He is very reserved and rarely talks to anyone. He is particularly shy around women and rejects their advances. One day he sees a girl his own age on the balcony of the building opposite his and becomes infatuated with her. He begins to fantasise about her and one day decides to follow her while she is out shopping. He sees her buying an egg in a shop, goes inside briefly after she leaves, and then follows her home. As she looks for her key, he tells her, "Excuse me, Mademoiselle, you dropped this." And he hands her an egg.

== Characters in Feuille d'Album ==
- Ian French, a painter; likes to sit in cafés in Paris. He lives in a studio.
- his neighbour, a girl of his age, who goes out shopping on Thursdays.

== Major themes ==
- Sleeping
- Eating
- Drama
- loving
- Wearing
- Cooking

== Literary significance ==
The text is written in the modernist mode, without a set structure, and with many shifts in the narrative.
