= Sun and Moon (Mansfield) =

1920 short story by Katherine Mansfield

"Sun and Moon" is a 1920 short story by Katherine Mansfield. It was first published in the Athenaeum on 1 October 1920, and later reprinted in Bliss and Other Stories.

== Plot summary ==
The children, Sun and Moon, are hanging around the house while a party is being prepared. They play games, then are sent off to bed. The party wakes them up; their parents find them out of their beds and instead of scolding them, they let them go downstairs for a bite - but Sun starts sobbing because Moon has eaten the nut from the centerpiece (the moment of ruined perfection, a recurring theme in Mansfield's work), and they are sent off to bed again.

== Characters ==
- Sun (a boy)
- Moon (a girl)
- Nurse
- Annie
- Mother
- Father
- the pianist
- Minnie, the new cook.
- Nellie, the housemaid.

== Major themes ==
- The gap between children and adults

== Literary significance ==
The text is written in the modernist mode, without a set structure, and with many shifts in the narrative.
