= Bohemia in London =

1907 book by Arthur Ransome

- dust jacket
- Author: Arthur Ransome
- Illustrator: Fred Taylor
- Language: English
- Publisher: Chapman and Hall
- Publication date: September 1907
- Publication place: United Kingdom
- OCLC: 5973192

Bohemia in London (1907) was Arthur Ransome's seventh published book, and his first success. The book is about literary and artistic London in the 1900s, and the area of London covered is Chelsea, Soho, and Hampstead. He had moved to London in 1901, and first lived in Chelsea. It was published by Chapman and Hall in late September 1907. An American edition was published by Dodd, Mead of New York in 1907, who also published it in Canada under the imprint of the Musson Book Co of Toronto. A "slightly bawdy" ballad had to be omitted for North America. A second edition was published by his new publisher Stephen Swift Ltd (Charles Granville) in 1912, before Granville absconded. A new edition was published by the Oxford University Press in 1984.

Ransome himself wrote that it was his first book that "was not altogether a makeshift". In 1906 he was approached by Stefana Stevens a "clever young woman" who worked for Curtis Brown, a London literary agency founded in 1899. She was later an authority on Middle Eastern folklore, and as E. S. Stevens a popular romantic novelist. He was having tea with Cecil Chesterton at the St George's in St Martin's Lane, when she leant across the table and said:

There's a book that ought to be written, and you are the one that ought to write it, a book on Bohemia in London, an essayistical sort of book, putting Bohemia of today against a background of the past. Think it over, I've got a publisher waiting for it.

It did not take much thinking about; he sketched a synopsis the next day and two days later Curtis Brown had a contract for him with the publisher Chapman and Hall, whose office was also in Henrietta Street; and to his “further amazement” the unwritten book was also sold to Dodd, Mead in New York, for "respectable royalties" in both countries. He worked in Chelsea and the London Library. He went off to Cartmel with crates of books and had more sent by the London Library, and "settled down at Wall Nook to be Hazlitt, Lamb and Leigh Hunt all rolled into one." As illustrator he selected Fred Taylor, impressed by his black-and white poster of a newsboy used to advertise the bookseller W. H. Smith.

== Critical reaction ==
Hugh Brogan calls it "Ransome's first real book" and with drawings by Fred Taylor "easily the best-looking Ransome volume ever produced." It is a long discourse and a guide to Bohemian London in the early twentieth century, between the eras of Enoch Soames and Ezra Pound. Earlier inhabitants are included, particularly William Hazlitt and also Dr. Johnson, Charles Lamb and John Dryden. Ben Jonson sings drinking songs. Brogan finds the picture of artistic London convincing if sometimes overblown, and a foreshadowing of his journalism. With good reviews, it was his first success.

Roland Chambers said that Ransome had "made his most sustained effort to date", and that the book "was nostalgically reviewed by Ransome himself in the Onlooker six years later, and even at the time was written in a style suggesting a kindness for days distilled and softened by the distant past".
