= Pictures (short story) =

1917 short story by Katherine Mansfield

"Pictures" is a 1917 short story by Katherine Mansfield. It was first published under the title of The Common Round in the New Age on 31 May 1917 and later as The Pictures in Art and Letters in Autumn 1919. It was then reprinted as Pictures in Bliss and Other Stories.

== Plot summary ==
Miss Moss wakes up in the morning and she is hungry because she didn't have dinner the night before, nor is she going to have breakfast : she cannot afford it. Then her landlady turns up and gives her a letter hoping that it would be the rent, but it is note from an employment agency, saying they will get back to her. The landlady walks out with the letter. Then Miss Moss goes for a walk in the streets of London; she sees a milkboy; she walks into a café where a waitress is saying to the cashier that she was given a brooch the day before. Miss Moss cannot have tea because the café is closed however. Then she goes to Mr Kadgit's but his charwoman tells her he is not there because it is Saturday. Next she goes to Mr Bithem's, an employment agency, and he tells her there is no work for her. She then decides to go into a café and there a stout man sits beside her and then they leave together.

== Characters ==
- Miss Ada Moss, a contralto singer. She is unemployed and penniless.
- Minnie, the landlady. Miss Moss describes her as 'cockroach'.
- the milkboy
- the waitress
- the cashier
- Mr Kadgit
- the charwoman
- Mr Clayton, a jester.
- the chorus
- Mr Bithem
- the stout gentleman
- the wise man

== Major themes ==
- Unemployment

== Literary significance ==
The text is written in the modernist mode, without a set structure, and with many shifts in the narrative.

== References to other works ==
- The song Waiting for the Robert E. Lee is mentioned; it is perhaps best known as sung by Al Jolson.
- The song Heart of Oak is also mentioned, denoting bravery.
