= The Woman at the Store =

1912 short story by Katherine Mansfield

"The Woman At The Store" is a 1912 short story by Katherine Mansfield. It was first published in Rhythm in Spring 1912 and was republished in Something Childish and Other Stories (1924).

== Plot summary ==
Jo, Jim, and the unnamed narrator are riding across country, but are exhausted and need to rest. Also, one of their horses has developed a friction wound which needs treatment. Jim tells the others there is a store nearby, which he visited four years ago. He jokes that it is run by a pretty and vivacious blue-eyed blonde. But when they arrive at the store they are greeted by a haggard and disheveled woman, with missing teeth, who is brandishing a rifle and appears mentally unstable. She is alone except for her scruffy and unpleasant little girl, and says her husband is “off shearing”.

The travellers purchase an embrocation to treat the injured horse, and ask if they can camp overnight in a field on the property. At first the woman declines but then she changes her mind, and even invites them to have dinner with her later. Jo and the narrator joke with Jim about his earlier glamorous description of the woman, and Jim says he’s amazed at the change in her appearance; when he last saw her she had been “as pretty as a wax doll” and used to boast that she knew “how to kiss one hundred and twenty-five different ways”.

Later the three travellers go to meet the woman for dinner. Their hostess has attempted to make herself more presentable, by arranging her hair and putting on rouge and a different dress. Jo has also spruced himself up and seems to fancy her. Everyone proceeds to get drunk and Jo and the woman start to flirt. The woman's daughter claims to be drawing a nude picture of the narrator, saying she watched her bathing in the river earlier. The narrator is unsettled but the picture is not revealed.

As she gets more drunk the woman confides that her husband often beats her, forces sex on her, and goes away for months at a time, leaving her alone and isolated. The store once made a good living from travellers, but since “the coach” stopped coming they have few customers and are living in poverty. When the guests are ready to turn in, she invites them to stay overnight in the store.

Meanwhile the woman’s surly little daughter threatens to draw a picture that “she's not allowed to”; the mother responds violently, giving the child a smack and threatening her with worse if she does.

At the woman’s suggestion, Jim and the narrator agree to sleep in the storeroom with the child, while Jo bunks down in the main room. A little later they hear him sneak into the woman’s bedroom. “It’s the loneliness” says Jim. “My poor brother!” exclaims the narrator.

The little girl, angry at having to stay in the storeroom with the travellers, defiantly draws the “forbidden” picture and shows it to them. It depicts the woman shooting a man with a rook rifle and then burying him.

Jim and the narrator are too shocked to sleep. In the morning they are glad to pack up and leave the store, but Jo elects to stay. They have no choice but to ride off and leave him with a woman they now know to be a murderer.

== Characters ==
- Jo
- Jim
- The narrator
- The woman at the store. She was a barmaid until she got married. She tries to justify why she killed her husband though she does not actually admit guilt.
- The woman's young daughter. She has been neglected by her mother ("Shut your mouth," said the woman). She likes drawing, and is a generally unruly child: she plays in the dirt, picks earwax from her ears and spies on the narrator whilst she is bathing. She is also distressed at having to live with her mother who killed her father.

== Major themes ==
- Loneliness
- Isolation in the New Zealand country side
- Women and their choices
- Child-bearing
- Loss of childhood innocence

== References to actual history ==
- The woman has a journal with coverage on Queen Victoria's Jubilee and a portrait of Richard Seddon.

== Literary significance ==
The text is written prior to Mansfield's shift to the modernist mode, with a linear narrative and conventional resolution in denouement. Because of this, Mansfield grew to dislike the story somewhat, and refused to have the story reprinted "par example" in her lifetime.
