= The Doves' Nest =

Collection of short stories by Katherine Mansfield,

First edition (publ. Constable & Co.)

The Doves' Nest and Other Stories is a 1923 collection of short stories by the writer Katherine Mansfield, published by her husband John Middleton Murry after her death.

Murry wrote in his introductory note that this volume contains all the complete stories, and several fragments of stories, which she wrote at the same time as, or after, those published in The Garden Party and Other Stories

== Stories ==
1. "The Doll's House" (1922) (set in New Zealand)
2. "Honeymoon" (1923)
3. "A Cup of Tea" (1922)
4. "Taking the Veil" (1923)
5. "The Fly" (1922)
6. "The Canary" (1923)
7. "A Married Man's Story" (1923)
8. "The Doves' Nest"
9. "Six Years After" (set in New Zealand)
10. "Daphne"
11. "Father and the Girls"
12. "All Serene"
13. "A Bad Idea"
14. "A Man and his Dog"
15. "Such a Sweet Old Lady"
16. "Honesty"
17. "Susannah"
18. "Second Violin" (set in London)
19. "Mr. and Mrs. Williams"
20. "Weak Heart" (set in New Zealand)
21. "Widowed" (set in London)
