= The Little Governess =

1915 short story by Katherine Mansfield

"The Little Governess" is a 1915 short story by Katherine Mansfield. It was first published in Signature on 18 October 1915 under the pen name of Matilda Berry, and later reprinted in Bliss and Other Stories. The text is written in the modernist mode, without a set structure, and with many shifts in the narrative.

== Plot summary ==
After receiving advice from the lady at the Governess Bureau, a young and naive English governess (referred to throughout as "the little governess") is off on the train from France to Munich, from where she will go to a new house for work. The governess has never been abroad before, and is duly forewarned of the dangers by the lady at the Governess Bureau, who tells her to "mistrust people at first". She is harassed by a porter on the way to her train, and once aboard, by a group of rowdy French men. The porter, dissatisfied with the pay that he has received, tears away the 'Ladies Only' sign on the carriage that the governess sits. An old man, "at least ninety", sits in her quarter, and the pair begin talking. She finds out he is German; he lets her look at his newspapers. Then the train stops because of a hitch on the track, and he buys her some strawberries; the train gets going again. He insists on showing her around Munich and she agrees. At the station, he walks her to her hotel, and she sees the shabby room she was supposed to stay in all day and wait for Frau Arnholdt to take her to her new house.

They take a stroll in Munich, then go to a museum, then to the Englischer Garten. She doesn't have the time and wants to return to her hotel, but he suggests having an ice cream before she leaves. She gushes, telling him that "this has been the happiest day of my life." She has begun to perceive the old man, who is a Regierungsrat (senior civil servant), as a sort of grandfather. After the ice cream, he insists that she comes up to his apartment, to see his home and receive an attar of roses, "for remembrance". When up in his apartment, he offers her wine, and kisses her without her consent. In shock ("It was a dream! It wasn't true!") she runs out into the street and takes a cab back to the hotel, where she is told Frau Arnholdt came and left when the manager told her he did not know when she would be back.

== Themes ==
=== Feminism ===
According to Sydney Janet Kaplan, the story "seems a response to women's victimization, isolation and lack of support for one another". Kaplan notes that it may be inspired by Mansfield's own experiences of international solo travel as a woman. The governesses' plight is Mansfield's attempt to highlight, through the portrayal of a naive and trusting young woman being misled and exploited, the systemic sexual oppression of the time, which leads ultimately to her employment being jeopardized.
