= A Dill Pickle =

- Short story by Katherine Mansfield

Publication
- Published in: The New Age
- Publication date: 4 October 1917

"A Dill Pickle" is a 1917 short story by Katherine Mansfield. It was first published in the New Age on 4 October 1917. A revised version later appeared in Bliss and Other Stories. The characters and their relationship possibly were inspired by Mansfield's older sister Vera Margaret Beauchamp and her husband James Mackintosh Bell.

== Plot ==
A man and a woman who used to be romantically involved meet by chance in a tea-house not having seen each other for about six years. We learn that the woman ended their earlier relationship in a letter she wrote to him, but we come to doubt that she expected the letter to do so. They sit together and reminisce about past events – for example, the day they spent at Kew Gardens together. Both initially seem to regret not being friends any longer. The man tells her about his many journeys abroad, insisting that he has accomplished alone the things they had said they would do together. He tells her about Russia and how different the society is there. Despite his originally being perhaps poorer and her being better-off (there is a reference to her in the past eating expensive caviar), now the man seems to be prosperous, while the woman has perhaps fared less well, having had, for example, to give up her piano. The man's manners, however, still partly reflect his poorer origins. For example, the man unwittingly risks offending the woman by recalling that she had few friends. He also talks repeatedly about money and what things cost. He claims that when they were together he loved her more than she him. The reader, however, can see that the woman remains attracted to him, and the man appears uncommitted; finally, the man dismisses their earlier selves as immature, mentioning how he had studied the mind while he was in Russia. Here he is unable to complete his sentence because his companion suddenly leaves. He recovers quickly from this surprise, though, asking the waitress not to charge him for the cream which had not been used.

== Summary ==
This story is about a broken past relationship between a man and a woman named Vera. During a sudden reunion their memories of the past resurface, highlighting their present reality of a change of status.

== Characters ==
- Vera, the female protagonist, a somewhat passive woman
- Vera's former love, the male protagonist, who remains unnamed, a self-centered and insensitive man
