= Bliss (short story collection) =

1920 collection of short stories by Katerine Mansfield

Bliss and Other Stories is a 1920 collection of short stories by the writer Katherine Mansfield.

== Stories ==
1. "Prelude" (1918)
2. "Je ne parle pas français" (1917) (censored for collection; see article)
3. "Bliss" (1918)
4. "The Wind Blows" (1920)
5. "Psychology" (1920)
6. "Pictures" (1917)
7. "The Man Without a Temperament" (1920)
8. "Mr Reginald Peacock's Day" (1920)
9. "Sun and Moon" (1920)
10. "Feuille d'Album" (1917)
11. "A Dill Pickle" (1917)
12. "The Little Governess" (1915)
13. "Revelations" (1920)
14. "The Escape" (1920)
