= The Tiredness of Rosabel =

Short story by Katherine Mansfield

"The Tiredness of Rosabel" is a short story by Katherine Mansfield, written in 1908 and posthumously published in 1924. The story is about a young working-class woman's fantasies of a more luxurious life.

== Plot ==
Rosabel is a young woman employed in a millinery; the story begins as she is commuting home after a long day of work. On the bus, Rosabel fantasises about a hearty roast dinner; she had eaten very little that day, as she spent a sizeable sum of money on a bouquet of violets instead.

Rosabel arrives home, sits beside her window, and begins to reflect upon the events of her day. At work, Rosabel had assisted a wealthy and rather demanding couple. The woman eventually requests that Rosabel try on a hat with a large feather; she remarks that it suits Rosabel beautifully. This incenses Rosabel, though she does not show it. The woman decides to buy this hat, and leaves the man —Harry — to pay for it. When left alone with Rosabel, Harry remarks on the prettiness of her figure.

After this comment, Rosabel could not think of anything but Harry. In her room, Rosabel imagines herself in the place of his companion; she fantasises about a maid helping her put on the feathered hat, a veil, and suede gloves. She imagines that Harry buys her a magnificent bouquet of violets, and then takes her to a lavish lunch at the Carlton Hotel; following this, they attend a ball, in Rosabel she captures the attention of a foreign prince. She imagines being engaged to Harry the next day, marrying him at St. George's, Hanover Square, and honeymooning at Harry's ancestral home.

Rosabel stops fantasising, and prepares herself for bed. Despite her rough calico nightdress and grimy quilt, Rosabel sleeps well, and has pleasant dreams. When she wakes in the morning, she smiles.

== Major themes ==
Rosabel's fantasies instantiate escapism, particularly in relation to her social class. During her commute, Rosabel is disgusted by a young woman reading about 'a hot, voluptuous night, a band playing, and a girl with lovely, white shoulders' in a middle-brow novel (p. 1); however, Rosabel's own fantasy of the ball with Harry also involves 'a voluptuous night, a band playing, and her lovely white shoulders' (p. 4, Mansfield's emphasis). Mansfield critiques tawdry, mass-produced escapist visions while simultaneously showing how easily they can be adopted. Similarly, the world as seen through a window — on the bus, and in her home — is brighter and grander to Rosabel. Windows symbolise the division between her private thoughts and public life, emphasising that Rosabel's place in the world is incompatible with how she sees herself.
