= The Wind Blows (short story) =

"The Wind Blows" is a short story by Katherine Mansfield. It was first published in the magazine Signature (4 October 1915) as “Autumns: II” under the pseudonym Matilda Berry. It was published in revised form in the Athenaeum on 27 August 1920, and subsequently reprinted in Bliss and Other Stories.

== Plot summary ==
Matilda is woken up by the wind; she looks out the window; her neighbour, Marie, is fetching flowers from the garden and then Matilda’s mother is called for the telephone by Bogey, Matilda’s brother. Matilda is off to Mr Bullen's for her music lesson. Her mother does not want her to go due to the strong wind, but she goes anyway. After the lesson, she goes for a walk with her brother to the esplanade. Here, the story changes from present to past narrative as Mansfield shows that the music lesson, the walk etc. all occurred in Matilda's past, and she and her brother are actually sailing away on board a ship several years down the line, that all that went before were memories.

== Characters ==
- Marie Swainson
- Bogey
- Matilda
- Mr Bullen - the character of Mr Bullen is based on the musician Robert Parker

== Major themes ==
- Isolation

== Literary significance ==
The text is written in the modernist mode, without a set structure, and with many shifts in the narrative.

== References to other works ==
- Beethoven, Edward Alexander MacDowell and Anton Grigorovich Rubinstein are mentioned.
- Marie misquotes Percy Shelley's poem The Clouds.
