= The Doll's House (short story) =

1922 short story by Katherine Mansfield

"The Doll's House" is a 1922 short story by Katherine Mansfield. It was first published in The Nation and Atheneum on 4 February 1922 and subsequently appeared in The Doves' Nest and Other Stories (1923). Mansfield used an alternative title in other editions, including "At Karori".
