= In a German Pension =

Short story collection by Katherine Mansfield

In a German Pension is a 1911 collection of short stories by the writer Katherine Mansfield; her first published collection. All but three of the stories were originally published in The New Age edited by A. R. Orage; the first to appear was "The Child-Who-Was-Tired". The last three were first published in this collection, and her biographer Anthony Alpers thinks that two (The Swing of the Pendulum and The Blaze) were probably rejected by Orage for The New Age.

The collection was originally published in December 1911 by Stephen Swift & Co Ltd; the imprint of Charles Granville the publisher of Rhythm. The first impression of probably 500 copies was followed by two more impressions of 500 copies in January and in May or June 1912. In early October 1912 Granville absconded to Algiers, and his firm was liquidated. A story that copies for America went down with the Titanic in April 1912 is probably not true.

Mansfield refused permission for a reprint of the collection in 1920, both as they were juvenilia and they could contribute to post-war jingoism. In 1926 after her death her husband John Middleton Murry reprinted them. Alpers says that Mansfield is famous for just two books .... an earlier one being happily forgotten; the two books being Bliss and Other Stories and The Garden Party.

The stories were written after her stay in Bad Wörishofen, a German spa town, in 1909, where she was taken by her mother after her disastrous marriage, pregnancy and miscarriage. Some reflect on the habits and demeanour of Germans, and some refer to the exploitation and repression of women by men.

"A Birthday" has a man, based on her father Harold Beauchamp, waiting for his wife to give birth; he mutters Everything here's filthy, the whole place might be down with the plague .. The setting is identifiable as turn-of-the-century Thorndon when it was an unhealthy hole from the mid-1880s because of poor sewage rather than the setting for grand residences and society balls as in her later stories. The Beauchamp family moved to rural Karori in 1893.

== Stories ==
1. "Germans at Meat" (The New Age, 3 March 1910)
2. "The Baron" (The New Age, 10 March 1910)
3. "The sister of the Baroness" (The New Age, 4 August 1910)
4. "Frau Fischer" (The New Age, 18 August 1910)
5. "Frau Brechenmacher Attends a Wedding" (The New Age, 21 July 1910)
6. "The Modern Soul" (The New Age, 22 June 1911)
7. "At “Lehmann’s”" (The New Age, 7 July 1910)
8. "The Luft Bad" (The New Age, 24 March 1911) (spelt Luftbad in German)
9. "A Birthday" (The New Age, 18 May 1911) (probably written about her father; but names changed to German names for the collection
10. "The Child-Who-Was-Tired" (The New Age, 24 February 1910; her first appearance)
11. "The Advanced Lady"
12. "The Swing of the Pendulum"
13. "A Blaze"

== Sources ==
- Alpers, Antony, ed. (1984). The Stories of Katherine Mansfield. Auckland: Oxford University Press. pp. xv, xvi. ISBN 0-19-558113-X.
- Kirkpatrick, R. J. (1989). A Bibliography of Katherine Mansfield. Oxford: Clarendon Press. ISBN 0-19-818401-8.
