= The Garden Party (short story) =

Short story by Katherine Mansfield

"The Garden Party" is a 1922 short story by Katherine Mansfield. It was first published (as "The Garden-Party") in three parts in the Saturday Westminster Gazette on 4 and 11 February 1922, and the Weekly Westminster Gazette on 18 February 1922. It later appeared in The Garden Party and Other Stories. Its luxurious setting is based on Mansfield's childhood home at 133 Tinakori Road (originally numbered 75), the second of three houses in Thorndon, Wellington that her family lived in.

== Summary ==
The wealthy Sheridan family are preparing themselves to host a garden party. Laura is charged with commanding the workers on the placement of the marquee. Her "superior" air quickly disintegrates into an admiration for the workingmen, with whom she feels a personal connection. Laura's mother, Mrs. Sheridan, has ordered masses of lilies, to both their delight. Laura's sisters, Meg and Jose, and their servant Hans, move furniture around to accommodate the piano. Jose tests the piano, and then sings a song in case she is asked to do so again later. After surveying the food in the kitchen, Laura and Jose learn that their working-class neighbour Mr. Scott has died just outside their gate. While Laura believes the party should be called off, neither Jose nor their mother agrees. After catching herself in the mirror wearing a new hat, Laura eases her conscience by deciding to forget the matter until the party is over. When the evening comes, and the family is sitting underneath the marquee, Mrs. Sheridan tells Laura to take a basket full of leftovers to the Scotts' house. Laura is led into the poor neighbours' house by Mrs. Scott's sister, sees the pitiable figure of the widow, and is led to the late husband's corpse. Here, Laura is intrigued by the peacefulness of the dead man's face, and she finds his face in death just as beautiful as life as she knows it. Having fled the house, Laura meets her brother Laurie at the corner of the lane. She finds herself burdened by emotion, saying "Isn't life-" but unable to finish the sentence. Her brother replies by saying, "Isn't it, darling?"

== Characters in "The Garden Party" ==
- Laura Sheridan: Mrs. Sheridan's daughter (and the story's protagonist)
- Mrs. Sheridan: Mr. Sheridan's wife and mother of Laura, Laurie, Meg, and Jose. She is in charge of the household and relinquishes charge of the garden party to Laura.
- Laurie Sheridan: Laura's brother
- The workers: Who put up a marquee in the garden
- Mr. Sheridan: Mrs. Sheridan's husband and father of Laura, Laurie, Meg, and Jose. On the day of the party, he goes to work, but joins the party later that evening.
- Meg Sheridan: A second daughter
- Jose Sheridan: A third daughter
- Kitty Maitland: A friend of Laura and a party guest
- Sadie: A female house servant
- Hans: A male house servant
- The florist: Who delivers lilies ordered by Mrs. Sheridan
- Cook: a cook
- Mr. Scott: A working-class neighbour who has just died
- Em Scott: The deceased's widow
- Em's sister

== Major themes ==
Class consciousness. Laura feels a certain sense of kinship with the workers and again with the Scotts. An omniscient narrator also explains that, as children, Laura, Jose, Meg, and Laurie were not allowed to go near the poor neighbours' dwellings, which spoil their vista.

Illusion versus reality. Laura is stuck in a world of high-class housing, food, family, and garden parties. She then discovers her neighbour from a lower class has died and she clicks back to reality upon discovering death.

Sensitivity and insensitivity. The Sheridans hold their garden party, as planned, complete with a band playing music. Laura questions whether this will be appropriate, discovering the death of their neighbour only a few hours earlier.

Death and life. The writer handles the theme of death and life in the short story. Laura's realization that life is simply marvellous shows death of human beings in a positive light. Death and life co-exist, and death seems to Laura merely a sound sleep far away from troubles in human life.

== References to other works ==
- The names Meg, Jose, and Laurie may be related to Louisa May Alcott's 1868 novel Little Women.
- The characters are also used in Mansfield's 1921 short story "Her First Ball".
- The events of the story can be interpreted as mirroring the Greek myth of Persephone.

== Literary significance ==
The text is written in the modernist mode, without a set structure, and with many shifts in the narrative. Mansfield was seen as one of the prime innovators of the short story form.

== See also ==
- 1922 in literature
- Bildungsroman
