= Aloe Ridge Game Reserve =

Game reserve in Gauteng, South Africa

Coordinates: 25°58′41″S 27°49′41″E

Aloe Ridge Game Reserve is a game reserve and conservation park in central Gauteng province in north-east South Africa, lying some 15 kilometres directly north-east of the Sterkfontein caves. Located near Mulder's Drift it protects white rhino, buffalo, hippo, and many antelope and rare bird species. The reserve also has a Zulu craft centre and is open to tourists.
