= Je ne parle pas français =

Short story by Katherine Mansfield

"Je ne parle pas français" is a short story by Katherine Mansfield. She began it at the end of January 1918, and finished it by February 10. It was first published by the Heron Press in early 1920, and an excised version was published in Bliss and Other Stories later that year.

== Plot introduction ==
A French writer describes his encounter with an English writer, and the consequences thereof.

=== Title explanation ===
The title is French for 'I do not speak French'. Those are the first words spoken to Raoul on Mouse's arrival, and is also a phrase he found written on a table at a small cafe he enjoys.

== Plot summary ==
The narrator, Raoul, describes a café he likes to go to, the matron, and the waiter. Then he recounts how, as a child, his maid would kiss his ears and give him cakes. He explains that he is a writer, lives in a rented flat, is "rich" and has never dated women. Later, in the café he orders a whisky, which he hates but orders because he intends to write about an Englishman. He then tells about his friend, Dick, singing an English song. He recounts how he met this friend, Dick, at a party, and how he was invited to dinner a few days later. There they talked about literature, "but not only of literature"; by the end of the dinner, Dick sang his song again, and Raoul started crying. From then on, they spent a lot of time together.

Out of the blue, Dick says he is leaving for England the following day, and Raoul is offended. However, he then receives a nice letter from Dick, and finally another letter to say he is coming back indefinitely, and moving in with a woman and Raoul himself if he so wishes. After being bothered by his concierge, Raoul arrives at the train station, where he meets Dick and the woman, Mouse. They then go to a hotel by taxi together. There, after having Dick help the garçon haul the luggage up the stairs, Mouse orders tea, and Dick asks Raoul to post a letter to his mother. Mouse starts to cry and admits that things are bad between her and Dick. Later, Raoul reads out loud a letter from Dick to Mouse, in which he is breaking up with her. She is in despair, as she had already told her friends they were married.

At the end, Raoul says he never saw Mouse again, and he continues to go to seedy cafés.

== Characters in Je ne parle pas français ==
- Raoul Duquette, the narrator, a Parisian man who likes to sit in a specific café. He has a published book out, False Coins, and studies English literature.
- Madame, the matron at the helm of the café.
- Dick Harmon, an Englishman who speaks excellent French. He studies French literature.
- the concierge, whom Raoul attempts to get away from.
- Dick's mother
- Mouse, Dick's girlfriend.

== References to other works ==
- The opening speech by Orsino in Twelfth Night by William Shakespeare, through the use of the phrase "dying fall" in brackets.
- Rudyard Kipling is mentioned when Raoul talks about literary soirées.
- Raoul refers to Puccini's opera Madame Butterfly upon reading his letter from Dick (Pinkerton being an absent husband).

== Literary significance ==
The text is written in the modernist mode, without a set structure, and with many shifts in the narrative.

== Publishing history ==
Richard Arthur Murry, Mansfield's brother-in-law (younger brother of her husband John Middleton Murry), finished setting the type for the story on 9 November 1919. The story was originally published in a large format paper edition in simple green wraps. The title and the author's name, in all but one extant copy, were on a pasted label on the wrapper. John Middleton Murry later gave his history of the story. He wrote that the pamphlet "was printed for private circulation by my brother [Arthur] and myself... The stitching and binding took us the whole of January. Of the original 100 copies, about 20 were spoiled, and of the 80 perhaps 60 actually issued." The Humanities Research Center at the University of Texas at Austin asserts that of the "60 [that] were actually completed... perhaps 30 [were] distributed, mostly for review."

The Heron Press was in the Mansfield/Murry house, known to them as 'The Elephant', directly opposite Hampstead Heath on East Heath Road. Waiting For Godot Bookstore (Hadley, MA) claims on an internet book sale site that "OCLC locates only 21 worldwide holdings (18 of which are in American institutions)." The store also states that only a single copy has appeared at auction in the last thirty years (there are seven auction records listed in ABPC). Anthony Alpers writes that "this little private-press edition in which it first appeared is very rare.... Few know the story in its intended form."

The end of the story in the original version is considerably different from the story as it appeared in Bliss, as Constable's editor Michael Sadleir insisted on censoring sections, although Alpers said that they show the cynical attitudes to love and sex of the narrator Raoul (who was based on her lover Francis Carco). John Middleton Murry persuaded Sadleir to reduce the cuts slightly.

At first Mansfield, who was writing from Menton, was reluctant to see the story censored: "No, I certainly won't agree to those excisions if there were 500 million copies in existence. They can keep their old £40 & be hanged to them. Shall I pick the eyes of a story for £40? I am furious with [Michael] Sadler [at Constable]. No, Ill [sic] never agree.... The outline would be all blurred. I must have those sharp lines." By the following day she had decided to leave the final decision to Murry: "I leave it to you. Youre [sic] my Cricket. If you agree to what they say—why then, alls [sic] well (and I DO want the money.) Je t'aime." Those were not the last words she had for Murry on the subject of the altered text. The jacket for Bliss included these lines: "BLISS is the 'something new' in short stories that men will read and talk about and women learn by heart but not repeat." This infuriated Mansfield, who asked Murry,

Why didn't they have a photograph of me looking through a garter! But I was helpless here – too late to stop it – so now I must prove – no, convince people ce n'est pas moi. At least if I'd know they were going to that no power on earth would have made me cut a word. I wish I hadn't. I was wrong – very wrong."

== The original text ==
The original text has been restored in two scholarly editions, one edited by Antony Alpers (1984) and more recently in The Norton Critical Edition, edited by Vincent O'Sullivan (2006). The latter is in print and is the one cited here.

One of the censored passages comes as Duquette describes his experiences as a ten-year-old with the African laundress. The censored text is included in bold face:

"One day when I was standing at the door, watching her go, she turned round and beckoned to me, nodding and smiling in a strange secret way. I never thought of not following. She took me into a little outhouse at the end of the passage, caught me up in her arms and began kissing me. Ah, those kisses! Especially those kisses inside my ears that nearly deafened me.

"And then with a soft growl she tore open her bodice and put me to her. When she set me down she took from her pocket a little round fried cake cover with sugar and I reeled along the passage back to our door."

Shortly afterward, Duquette muses about the fact he "never yet made the first advances to any woman":

"Curious, isn't it? Why should I be able to have any woman I want? I don't Look at all like a maiden's dream . . . ."

More substantial changes are made toward the end of the story. When Duquette is bidding farewell to a prostitute on the street:

"Not until I was half-way down the boulevard did it come over me—the full force of it. Why, they were suffering . . . those two . . . really suffering. I have seen two people suffer as I don't suppose I ever shall again. . . . And . . . . ‘Goodnight, my little cat,’ said I, impudently, to the fattish old prostitute picking her way home through the slush . . . . I didn't give her time to reply."

Alterations continue at the end of the story:

"And so on and so on until some dirty gallant comes up to my table and sits opposite and begins to grimace and yap. Until I hear myself saying: ‘But I've got the little girl for you, mon vieux. So little . . . so tiny. And a virgin.’ I kiss the tips of my fingers—‘A virgin’—and lay them upon my heart."

The story's original ending goes beyond the text as printed by Constable in England and Borzoi in the United States:

"I must go. I must go. I reach down my coat and hat. Madame knows me. ‘You haven't dined yet?’ she smiles. ‘Not, not yet, Madame. I'd rather like to dine with her. Even to sleep with her afterwards. Would she be pale like that all over? But no. She'd have large moles. They go with that kind of skin. And I can't bear them. They remind me somehow, disgustingly, of mushrooms."
