= Prelude (short story) =

1918 short story by Katherine Mansfield

First edition

"Prelude" is a short story by Katherine Mansfield. It was first published by the Hogarth Press in July 1918, after Virginia Woolf encouraged her to finish the story. Mansfield had begun writing "Prelude" in the midst of a love affair she had in Paris in 1915. It was reprinted in Bliss and Other Stories (1920). The story was a compressed and subtler version of a longer work The Aloe, which was later published posthumously in full.

The story is based on the Beauchamps' move to Karori, a country suburb of Wellington, in 1893. Alpers says that some readers may not pick up the numerous hints that Linda is pregnant.

== Plot summary ==
The story is divided into twelve sections. It opens in medias res, and it is gradually developed that the Burnell family is moving out of their house.

I

There isn't enough room left on the buggy for Lottie and Kezia to get in because of all the stuff from the removal. A neighbour, Mrs Samuel Josephs, will look after them until another van comes in the evening to pick up other stuff. The children are told to mingle with the neighbours' children, and they are given tea.

II

Then Kezia goes back into her old house, looks about a few remaining items, then gets scared of something behind her. Lottie draws by and says the storeman is there to pick them up. They leave.

III

On the road the storeman refers to a lighthouse on Quarantine Island, thus suggesting that the story is set in Wellington. When they arrive, they are greeted by the grandmother; Linda has a headache; she and Aunt Beryl are having tea. Aunt Beryl and Stanley have argued over the fact that he was at work while she was left alone to deal with the removal.

IV

The grandmother tucks the children in: Lottie and Isabel in the same bed, Kezia with her. Lottie says a prayer. Aunt Beryl dreams of being independent from Stanley. Stanley brags about buying the new house so cheap, then goes to bed with Linda. Pat and the servant girl turn in too. The grandmother goes to bed the last.

V

The next day, Linda wakes up to a sunny weather and a husband boasting about his physique - she ridicules him slightly. Bored, she thinks of how she dreamt of birds.

VI

The grandmother is doing the dishes in the kitchen and remembers how, when they lived in Tasmania, Beryl was once stung by a red ant...Then Aunt Beryl wonders where she can put up some paintings she doesn't like. Linda comes up and is sent to the blooming garden to look after her children; Kezia and she look at an aloe.

VII

Stanley comes back delighted from work with cherries, oysters and a pineapple, willing to see his wife; Linda seems less happy; Aunt Beryl is 'restless'.

VIII

The girls play at grown-ups, until Pip and Rags, their cousins the Trout boys arrive. The garden is "boncer" (or bonzer, an Australasian word meaning "super").

IX

Pat chops off a duck's head to show the children that the duck still walks on for some instants after being killed; Kezia is shocked by the episode and demands Pat to "Put head back"

X

In the kitchen, Alice is reading a book on dreams; Aunt Beryl comes in and bosses her round, then feels better and walks out.

XI

They eat the duck for tea. Stanley and Aunt Beryl play a game of cribbage, and he wins. Linda and her mother take a turn in the garden to look at the aloe. To Linda, the tree gets her thinking that she loathes Stanley, and dreams about leaving the house; Mrs Fairfield thinks it would be good to make jam out of the berries in the vegetable garden.

XII

Aunt Beryl writes a letter to her friend Nan, saying she is bored with living in the countryside, then thinks to herself how despicably false and unhappy with herself she is, until Kezia calls for her to come to dinner.

== Characters in "Prelude" ==
- Linda Burnell, the mother, who is pregnant.
- Mrs Fairfield, the grandmother.
- Lottie, a Burnell child.
- Kezia, a Burnell child.
- Mrs Samuel Josephs, an elderly neighbour, with her speech impaired by a head cold.
- Sadie, a Samuel Josephs child.
- Moses, a Samuel Josephs child.
- Stanley Burnell, Linda's husband. Ginger-haired, blue-eyed. He likes to boast about buying the house cheap, and having a lean body.
- Fred, the storeman who picks up the Burnell children in the evening.
- Aunt Beryl Fairfield, Linda's younger sister.
- Pip, a cousin of Kezia's; tall, black-haired, white faced.
- Rags, a cousin of Kezia's; very small and thin. Pip and Rags are "the Trout boys".
- Isabel, a Burnell child.
- Pat, the handyman.
- Alice, the servant girl.
- Mrs Jones, a guest (played by a child).
- Gwen, a lady-help (also played by a child).

== Major themes ==
- Feminism, Aunt Beryl wishes she had 'money of her own'. Prelude describes the status of women in the 20th century before modernism.
- Isolation, "six miles away from town"-Stanley "No one will come to visit"- Beryl.
- Freedom, this is shown through animal and boat imagery.
- Servility, shown by Grandmother, Servant girl-Alice, and Pat.
- Family relationships

== Literary significance ==
The text is written in the modernist mode, without a set structure, and with many shifts in the narrative.

It also addresses the issues for women in the 20th Century.
