= Harold Beauchamp =

New Zealand businessman

Sir Harold Beauchamp
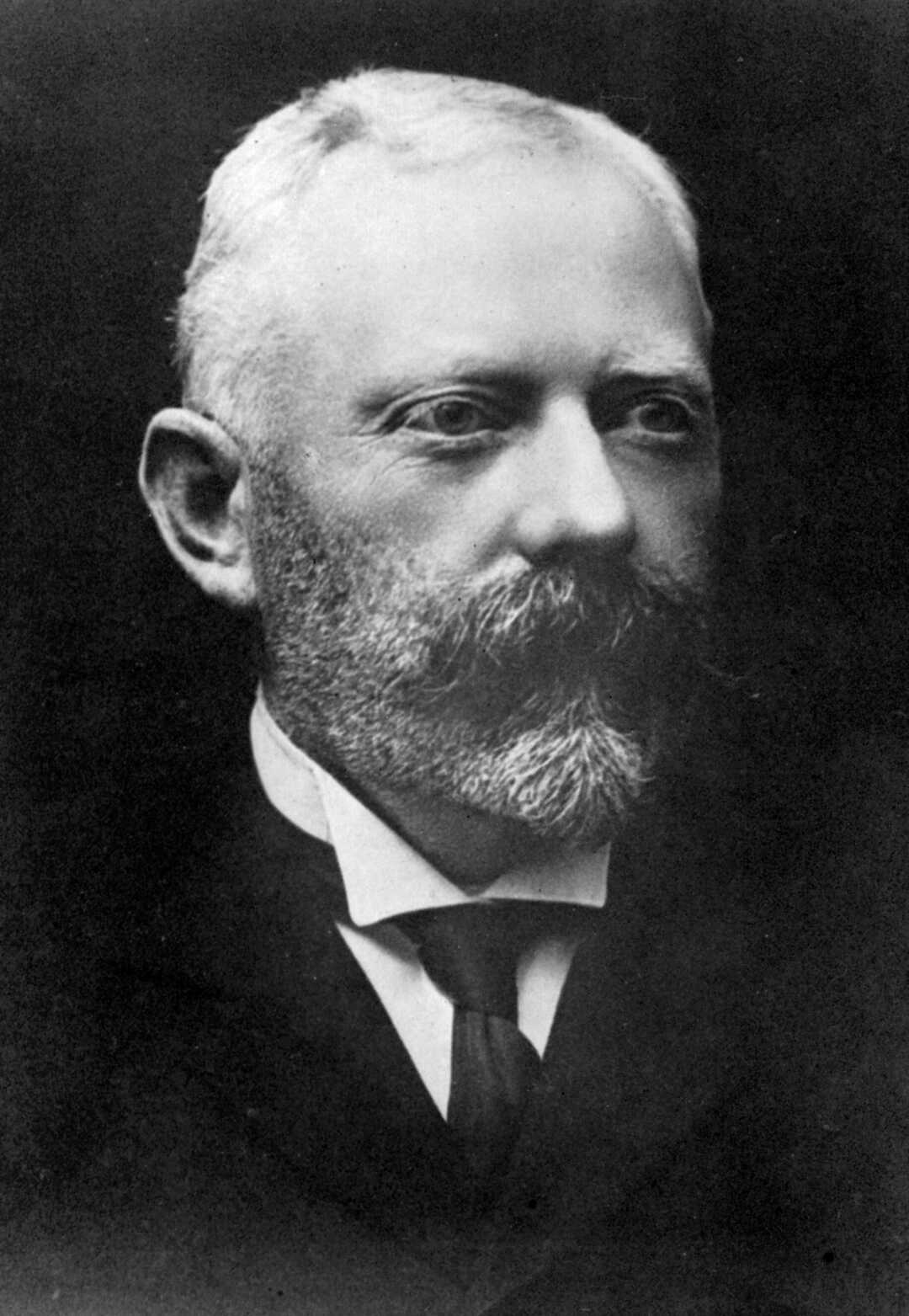
- Beauchamp c. 1910
- Born: 15 November 1858; Ararat, Colony of Victoria
- Died: 5 October 1938 (aged 79); 88 Hobson Street, Thorndon Wellington, New Zealand
- Known for: Importer and successful businessman; Chairman of the Bank of New Zealand
- Children: Katherine Mansfield
- Parent: Arthur Beauchamp
- Relatives: Elizabeth von Arnim (cousin)

Sir Harold Beauchamp (15 November 1858 – 5 October 1938) was a New Zealand businessman who was twice chairman of the Bank of New Zealand. He was the father of author Katherine Mansfield.

Australian by birth he was brought to New Zealand at the age of two and eventually made Wellington his home where, still young, he turned a small importing business into a substantial enterprise. He is believed to have crossed the Equator about 24 times travelling by sea to London maintaining business and banking contacts. Beauchamp died in Wellington in 1938 in his eightieth year survived by his second wife.

== Youth ==
Born in Ararat, Victoria, Australia on 15 November 1858 two-year-old Beauchamp moved with his family to Nelson, New Zealand in 1861 and then Picton. His parents were auctioneer Arthur Beauchamp and his wife born Mary Elizabeth Stanley. His father successfully contested the 1866 election for the Picton electorate but resigned in 1867, sold up and moved to isolated Beatrix Bay in Pelorus Sound / Te Hoiere.

After they moved to Wanganui in 1869, Harold attended Wanganui Collegiate School until he left at 14 to work for his father's general merchant and auctioneering business, sometimes as a drover. He appeared in the Magistrate's Court there, aged 15 and charged with "having wilfully damaged the road known as Shakespeare's Cliff Road, by driving a mob of cattle over the clay and mud embankment".

He moved to Wellington and after another two years with his father's new business there went to work for W. M. Bannatyne & Co., the importing firm of W. M. Bannatyne and his partner A. R. Baker. By the age of 26, in 1884, he had done well enough at Bannatyne's to marry. In 1888, he built a house for his growing family. The house, which was the birth place of his daughter, the writer Katherine Mansfield, is now a historic place and preserved as the Katherine Mansfield House and Garden.

== Marriage and children ==
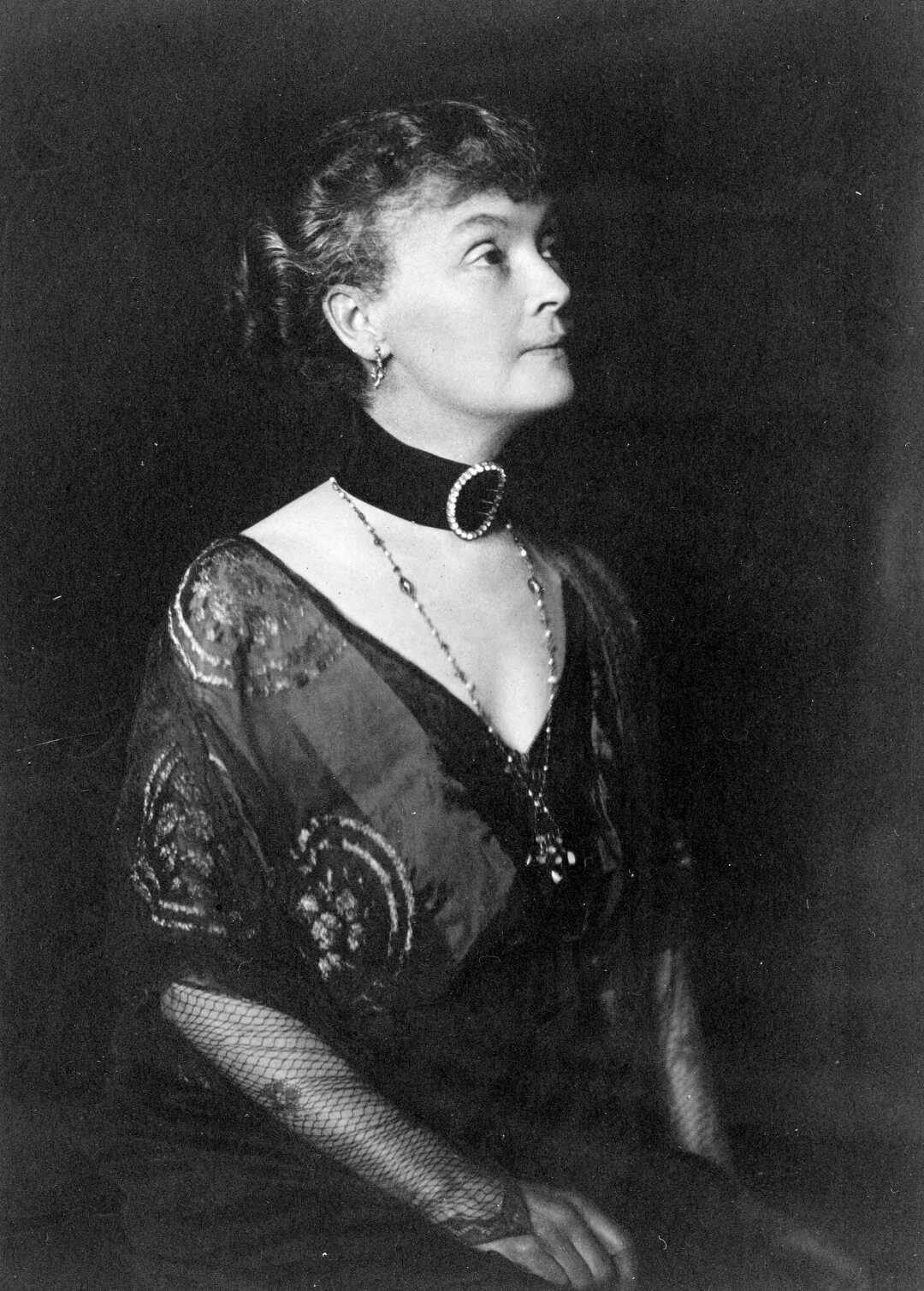
Mrs Beauchamp, c. 1914

Annie Burnell Dyer married Harold Beauchamp in 1884. She was the daughter of Joseph Dyer (1821–1877) and his wife Margaret Isabella née Mansfield —whose surname granddaughter Kathleen would take as her own.

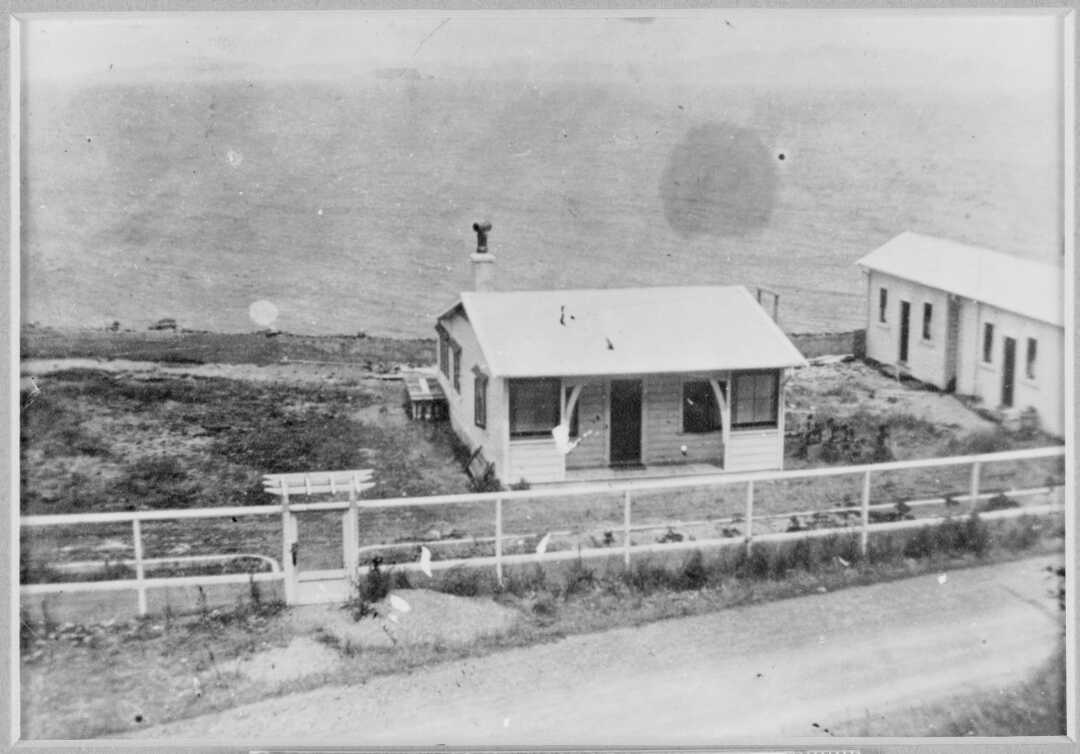
The Beauchamp family cottage in Day's Bay, bunk rooms on the right

Annie Beauchamp had six children. Leslie, the youngest, was their only son. Almost their entire married life was spent in one corner of Thorndon; in 1893 they moved to a larger house, Chesney Wold, in semi-rural Karori. In 1898, they moved back to Thordon and aside from a few years from 1916 in Wadestown in a house with spectacular views where Annie died, that small part of Thorndon remained the centre of family life.

The three eldest daughters attended Queen's College, London between 1903 and 1906. After this time, Beauchamp experienced multiple deaths in the family. His father Arthur died in Nelson in 1910. In the First World War his only son Leslie was killed in Ypres Salient, Belgium in October 1915, aged 21. His mother Mary died in 1917. Annie's health deteriorated and she died in Wellington on 8 August 1918 aged 54. In January 1920 he married widowed Laura Kate Bright, "one of Annie's best friends." In January 1923, his daughter Katherine Mansfield died of tuberculosis in Fontainebleau, France.

== W. M. Bannatyne & Co ==
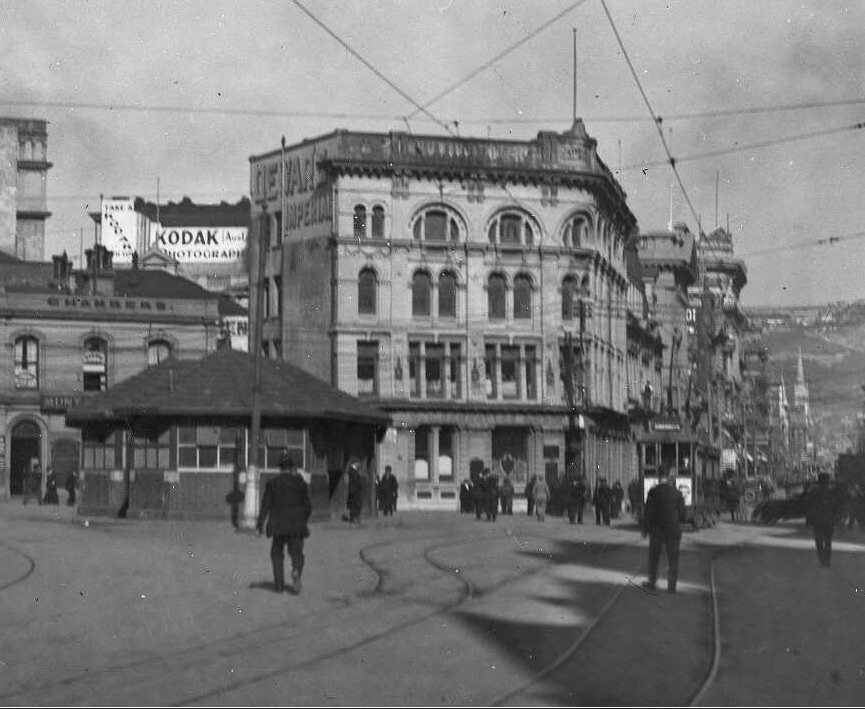
Bannatyne's building c. 1914 at the corner of Post Office Square and Customhouse Quay. Building and business sold to T & W Young in 1923

At the age of 18 Beauchamp went to work for Bannatyne and Bannatyne's partner, A. R. Baker. When he joined the staff was an office junior and a storeman and there was a travelling representative. He did very well, became a partner in 1889 after Bannatyne's death, and stayed with Bannatyne's to the end of his working life. Baker died in 1894 and, to take Baker's place, Beauchamp brought in Walter Nathan, former Tinakori Road next door neighbour —at 96 now 100 Hobson Street. He is reported to have said he made no profits from Bannatyne's until 1890.

Through Beauchamp's efforts, Bannatyne's became a substantial importing and distributing business operating throughout New Zealand. The multifarious items shipped in and distributed ranged from blasting powders and Nobel's Dynamite to teas, coffees, wines, bulk ales and whiskies.

He did not enter politics but did stand for election as a member of the Wellington Harbour Board in 1895 and later served as chairman.

Beauchamp bought another more spacious house in relatively remote Karori but they returned to fashionable Thorndon in 1898 when he joined the board of the Bank of New Zealand.

Walter Nathan died in 1922 and Beauchamp sold Bannatyne's to T & W Young for £150,000. He gave his large house and garden at 47 Fitzherbert Terrace — later demolished to form part of the compound of the Embassy of the United States in New Zealand — to form the core of a fund to buy pictures for the National Art Gallery now subsumed within Te Papa.

== Bank of New Zealand crisis ==
The government had been forced to rescue Auckland's Bank of New Zealand in 1894 and again in 1895 from its undue investment in its property speculations. The real estate was liquidated under government control by a specially constituted Assets Realisation Board —the Board's work dragged on until the end of 1906. Next, in 1896, attempting to be rid of a difficult banking competitor, the Bank of New Zealand over-reached by acquiring control of Dunedin's troubled Colonial Bank of New Zealand but the Bank of New Zealand was obliged to let its undigested partly-owned Colonial Bank subsidiary collapse in 1898. MPs Joseph Ward and William Larnach were among those ruined, Ward was required to quit parliament in 1897 but later restored his financial circumstances. Larnach (the original lead promoter of Colonial Bank and long service director who had freshly displayed his personal confidence in Colonial by buying yet more shares) committed suicide in October 1898 in a parliamentary committee room.

New directors were appointed in December 1898 under the Bank of New Zealand and Banking Amendment Act 1898. The Auckland Star reported from Wellington that "after prolonged consideration" the Cabinet had decided to appoint the following directors: J. R. Blair, mayor of Wellington, F. C. Malet of Christchurch, H. Beauchamp of Wellington and William Milne (1849–1942) of Oamaru a former Inspector of the Colonial Bank. Shareholders had previously elected William Watson (1846–1938) and Martin Kennedy both of Wellington to represent their interests.

=== Chairman ===
Beauchamp remained a director until 1936. He was chairman of directors from 1907 to 1911 and again from 1913 to 1922. He established relationships with bankers and distinguished authorities on finance in London and in New York and maintained them the rest of his life visiting in person every three or four years.

== Federation with Australia ==
As a member of the 1901 Royal Commission on Federation he advised against New Zealand joining the Australian federation. he attended the Sixth Congress of Federation of Chambers of Commerce of the British Empire and was received by King Edward VII.

Beauchamp was appointed a Knight Bachelor in the 1923 New Year Honours. In 1935, he was awarded the King George V Silver Jubilee Medal.

In his later years, he travelled frequently between London and Wellington and his reports of the trading outlook for New Zealand's primary exports widely reported.

== Death and legacy ==
Beauchamp died in Wellington, on 5 October 1938. He left substantial gifts to the National Art Gallery.

Harold's brother Harry Lomax Beauchamp farmed at Ōtaki for many years and died in 1939.

Political offices
Preceded by John Hutcheson	Chair of Wellington Harbour Board; 1900–1903	Succeeded by Nicholas Reid
