= The Aloe =

Novel by Katherine Mansfield

- First US edition
- Author: Katherine Mansfield
- Publisher: Alfred A. Knopf
- Publication date: 1930

The Aloe is a novel written by New Zealand author Katherine Mansfield. A longer version of her short story "Prelude", it was edited and published posthumously by her husband John Middleton Murry in 1930.

C. K. Stead's 2004 biographical novel Mansfield: A Novel focuses in part on Mansfield's efforts, during the years 1915 to 1918, to write The Aloe.
