= Rhythm (literary magazine) =

Cover of Rhythm, Winter 1911

Rhythm (briefly known as The Blue Review) was a literary, arts, and critical review magazine published in London, England, from 1911 to 1913.

== History of the magazine ==
The first issue of Rhythm was a summer 1911 edition. It was a quarterly until after the Spring 1912 issue, when it began to publish monthly. The final issue under the name Rhythm was published in March 1913; in May 1913, the magazine resumed publication under the name The Blue Review. After publishing additional issues in June and July 1913, the magazine then ceased publication.

The magazine, sometimes referred to as a "little magazine", was focused primarily on literature, music, art, and theatre.

Throughout its history, the magazine was edited by John Middleton Murry, who co-founded it with Michael Sadleir. Katherine Mansfield was the associate editor from June 1912 until the magazine folded. Its title was borrowed from a major painting of a female nude (a drawing of which appears on its front cover) by J. D. Fergusson who became its art editor. The magazine went through three separate publishers: it began with St Catherine Press; when it became a monthly, it was published by Stephen Swift & Co. Under the name The Blue Review, it was published by Martin Secker.

The painter Anne Estelle Rice was one of its chief illustrators.

According to arts historian Roger Neill:

The aesthetic concept of "rhythm" – harmony in nature, vigour and directness – provided the connective tissue, not only between two Scottish Colourists (Fergusson and Peploe, plus Rice), but also between the writers and artists involved with the magazine.

== Notable contributors ==
Cover of The Blue Review, May 1913

- Katherine Mansfield
- D.H. Lawrence
- Frank Harris
- Max Beerbohm
- Hugh Walpole
- Walter de la Mare
- William Denis Browne
- Anne Estelle Rice
