= Katherine Mansfield =

New Zealand author (1888–1923)

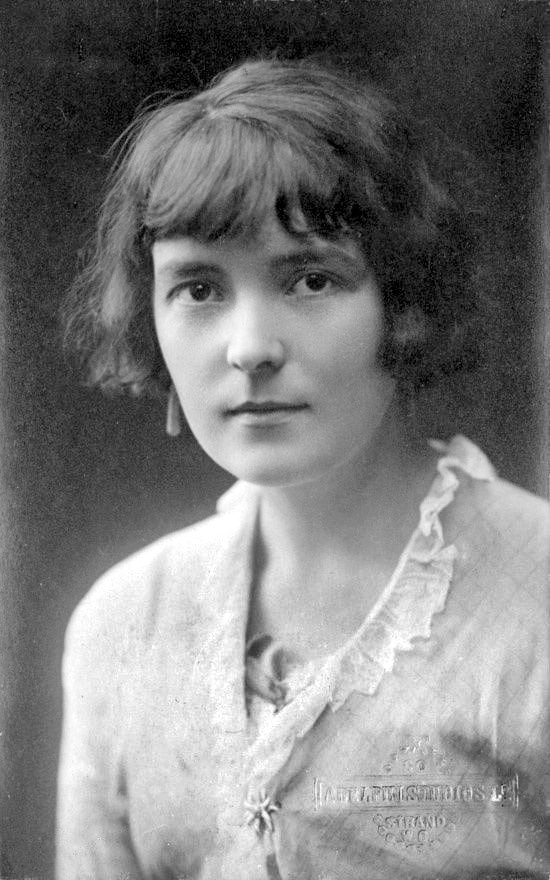
- Mansfield in 1914
- Born: Kathleen Mansfield Beauchamp; 14 October 1888; Thorndon, Wellington, New Zealand
- Died: 9 January 1923 (aged 34); Fontainebleau, Île-de-France, France
- Education: Queen's College, London
- Occupations: Short-story writer, poet
- Spouses: George Bowden (m. 1908; div. 1917); John Middleton Murry (m. 1918)
- Partners: Maata Mahupuku; Edith Kathleen Bendall; Ida Constance Baker
- Relatives: Arthur Beauchamp (grandfather); Harold Beauchamp (father); Elizabeth von Arnim (first cousin once removed)
- Writing career
- Period: 1908–1923
- Movement: Modernism
- Website: Official website

Kathleen Mansfield Murry (née Beauchamp; 14 October 1888 – 9 January 1923) was a New Zealand writer and critic who was an important figure in the modernist movement. Her works are celebrated across the world and have been published in 25 languages. Writer and literary critic Irène Némirovsky considers her the “spiritual heir” to the tradition initiated by Anton Chekhov, especially in her short stories.

Born and raised in a house on Tinakori Road in the Wellington suburb of Thorndon, Mansfield was the third child in the Beauchamp family. She began school in Karori with her sisters, before attending Wellington Girls' College. The Beauchamp girls later switched to the elite Fitzherbert Terrace School, where Mansfield became friends with Maata Mahupuku, who became a muse for early work and with whom she is believed to have had a passionate relationship.

Mansfield wrote short stories and poetry under a variation of her own name, Katherine Mansfield, which explored anxiety, sexuality, Christianity, and existentialism alongside a developing New Zealand identity. When she was 19, she left New Zealand and settled in England, where she became a friend of D. H. Lawrence, Virginia Woolf, Lady Ottoline Morrell and others in the orbit of the Bloomsbury Group. Mansfield was diagnosed with pulmonary tuberculosis in 1917, and she died in France aged 34.

== Biography ==
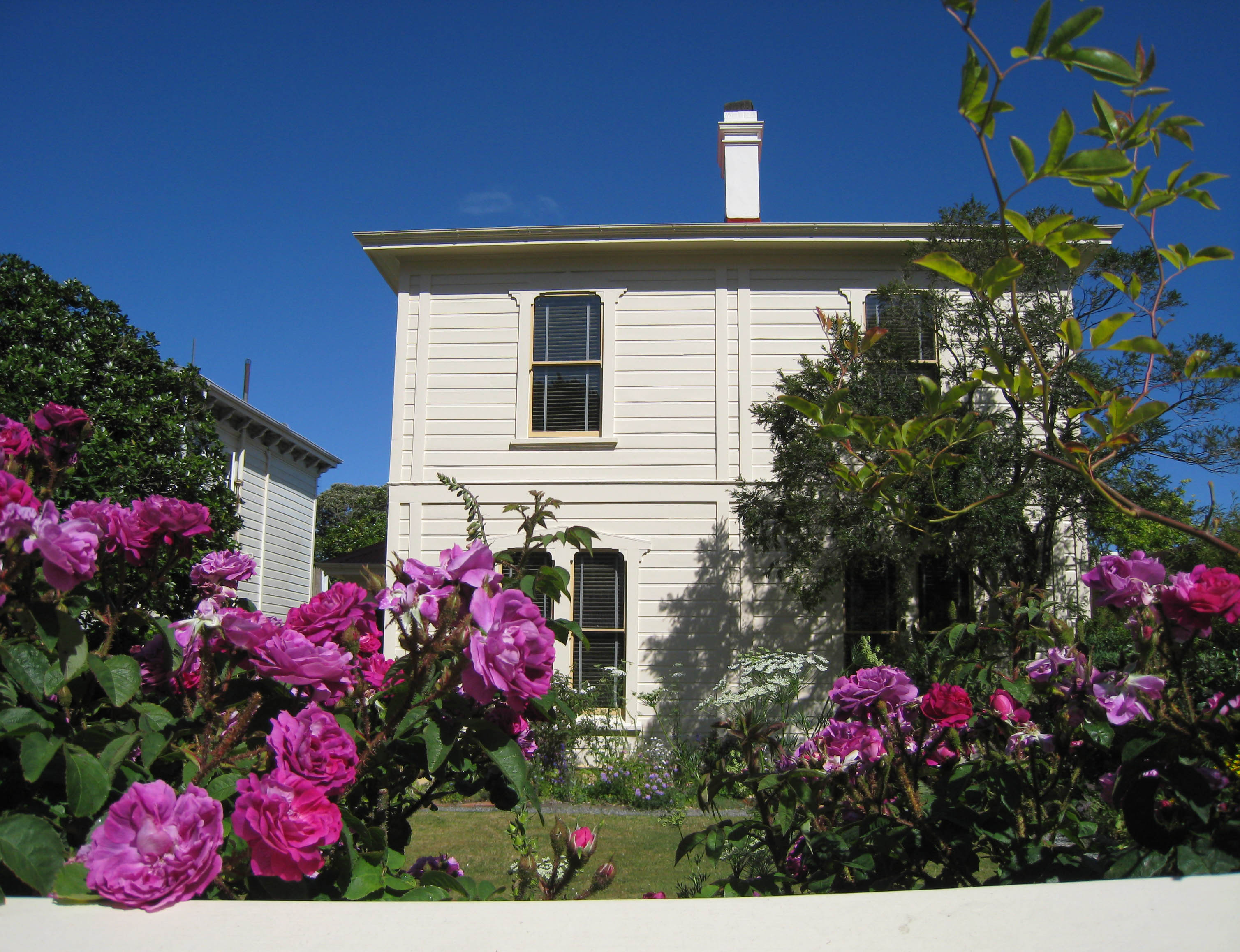
Katherine Mansfield's birthplace, Thorndon, New Zealand

=== Early life ===
Kathleen Mansfield Beauchamp was born in 1888 into a socially prominent Wellington family in Thorndon. Her grandfather Arthur Beauchamp briefly represented the Picton electorate in parliament. Her father Harold Beauchamp became the chairman of the Bank of New Zealand and was knighted in 1923. Her mother was Annie Burnell Beauchamp (née Dyer), whose brother married the daughter of Richard Seddon. Her extended family included the author Countess Elizabeth von Arnim, and her great-grand uncle was Victorian artist Charles Robert Leslie.

Mansfield had two elder sisters, a younger sister and a younger brother. In 1893, for health reasons, the Beauchamp family moved from Thorndon to the country suburb of Karori, where Mansfield spent the happiest years of her childhood. She used some of those memories as an inspiration for the short story "Prelude".

The family returned to Wellington in 1898. Mansfield's first printed stories appeared in the High School Reporter and the Wellington Girls' High School magazine in 1898 and 1899. Her first formally published story "His Little Friend" appeared the following year in a society magazine, New Zealand Graphic and Ladies Journal.

In 1902, at age 13–14, Mansfield became enamoured of Arnold Trowell, a cellist, but her feelings were for the most part not reciprocated. Mansfield was herself an accomplished cellist, having received lessons from Trowell's father.

=== London and Europe ===
She moved to London in 1903, where she attended Queen's College with her sisters. Mansfield recommenced playing the cello, an occupation that she believed she would take up professionally, but she began contributing to the college newspaper with such dedication that she eventually became its editor. She was particularly interested in the works of the French Symbolists and Oscar Wilde, and she was appreciated among her peers for her vivacious, charismatic approach to life and work.

Mansfield met fellow student Ida Baker at the college, and they became lifelong friends. They both adopted their mother's maiden names for professional purposes, and Baker became known as LM or Lesley Moore, adopting the name of Lesley in honour of Mansfield's younger brother Leslie.

Mansfield travelled in Continental Europe between 1903 and 1906, staying mainly in Belgium and Germany. After finishing her schooling in England she returned to New Zealand, and only then began in earnest to write short stories. She had several works published in the Native Companion (Australia), her first paid writing work, and by this time she had her heart set on becoming a professional writer. This was also the first occasion on which she used the pseudonym K. Mansfield. She rapidly grew weary of the provincial New Zealand lifestyle and of her family, and two years later, headed back to London. Her father sent her an annual allowance of 100 pounds for the rest of her life. In later years, she expressed both admiration and disdain for New Zealand in her journals, but she never was able to return there because of her tuberculosis.

Mansfield had two romantic relationships with women that are notable for their prominence in her journal entries. She continued to have male lovers and attempted to repress her feelings at certain times. Her first same-sex romantic relationship was with Maata Mahupuku (sometimes known as Martha Grace), a wealthy young Māori woman whom she had first met at Miss Swainson's school in Wellington and again in London in 1906. In June 1907, Mansfield wrote:

"I want Maata—I want her as I have had her—terribly. This is unclean I know but true."

Often referring to Maata as Carlotta, Mansfield wrote about her in several short stories. Maata married in 1907, but it is claimed that she sent money to Mansfield in London. The second relationship, with Edith Kathleen Bendall, took place from 1906 to 1908. Mansfield professed her adoration for her in her journals.

=== Return to London ===
After having returned to London in 1908, Mansfield quickly fell into a bohemian way of life. She published one story and one poem during her first 15 months there. Mansfield sought out the Trowell family for companionship, and while Arnold was involved with another woman, Mansfield embarked on a passionate affair with his brother Garnet. By early 1909, she had become pregnant by Garnet, but Trowell's parents disapproved of the relationship, and the two broke up. She then hastily entered into a marriage with George Bowden, a teacher of singing 11 years her senior; they were married on 2 March, but she left him the same evening before the marriage could be consummated.

After Mansfield had a brief reunion with Garnet, Mansfield's mother Annie Beauchamp arrived in 1909. She blamed the breakdown of the marriage to Bowden on a lesbian relationship between Mansfield and Ida Baker, and she quickly had her daughter dispatched to the spa town of Bad Wörishofen in Bavaria, where Mansfield miscarried. It is not known whether her mother knew of this miscarriage when she left shortly after arriving in Germany, but she cut Mansfield out of her will.

Mansfield's time in Bavaria had a significant effect on her literary outlook. In particular, she was introduced to the works of Anton Chekhov. Some biographers accuse her of plagiarizing Chekhov with one of her early short stories. She returned to London in January 1910. She then published more than a dozen articles in Alfred Richard Orage's socialist magazine The New Age and became a friend and lover of Beatrice Hastings, who lived with Orage. Her experiences in Germany formed the foundation of her first published collection In a German Pension (1911), which she later described as "immature".

=== Rhythm ===
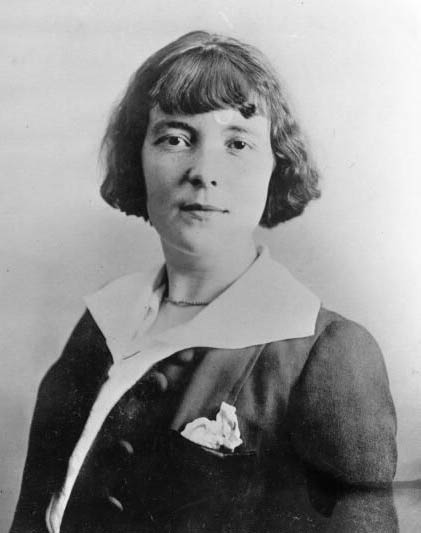
Mansfield in 1912

In 1910, Mansfield submitted a lightweight story to Rhythm, a new avant-garde magazine. The piece was rejected by the magazine's editor John Middleton Murry, who requested something darker. Mansfield responded with a tale of murder and mental illness titled "The Woman at the Store". Mansfield was inspired at this time by Fauvism.

Mansfield and Murry began a relationship in 1911 that culminated in their marriage in 1918, but she left him in 1911 and again in 1913. The characters Gudrun and Gerald in D. H. Lawrence's Women in Love are based on Mansfield and Murry.

Charles Granville (sometimes known as Stephen Swift), the publisher of Rhythm, absconded to Europe in October 1912 and left Murry responsible for the debts the magazine had accumulated. Mansfield pledged her father's allowance toward the magazine, but it was discontinued, being reorganised as The Blue Review in 1913 and folded after three issues. Mansfield and Murry were persuaded by their friend Gilbert Cannan to rent a cottage next to his windmill in Cholesbury, Buckinghamshire in 1913 in an attempt to alleviate Mansfield's ill health. The couple moved to Paris in January the following year with the hope that a change of setting would make writing easier for both of them. Mansfield wrote only one story during her time there, "Something Childish But Very Natural", then Murry was recalled to London to declare bankruptcy.

Mansfield had a brief affair with the French writer Francis Carco in 1914. Her visit to him in Paris in February 1915 is retold in her story "An Indiscreet Journey".

=== Impact of World War I ===
Mansfield's life and work were changed by the death of her younger brother Leslie Beauchamp, known as Chummie to his family. In October 1915, he was killed during a grenade training drill while serving with the British Expeditionary Force in the Ypres Salient, Belgium, aged 21. She began to take refuge in nostalgic reminiscences of their childhood in New Zealand. In a poem describing a dream she had shortly after his death, she wrote:

By the remembered stream my brother stands
Waiting for me with berries in his hands...
"These are my body. Sister, take and eat."

At the beginning of 1917, Mansfield and Murry separated, but he continued to visit her at her apartment. Ida Baker, whom Mansfield often called, with a mixture of affection and disdain, her "wife", moved in with her shortly afterwards. Mansfield entered into her most prolific period of writing after 1916, which began with several stories, including "Mr Reginald Peacock's Day" and "A Dill Pickle", being published in The New Age. Virginia Woolf and her husband Leonard, who had recently set up the Hogarth Press, approached her for a story, and Mansfield presented to them "Prelude", which she had begun writing in 1915 as "The Aloe". The story depicts a New Zealand family, configured like her own, moving house.

=== Diagnosis of tuberculosis ===
In December 1917, at the age of 29, Mansfield was diagnosed with pulmonary tuberculosis. For part of spring and summer 1918, she joined her friend Anne Estelle Rice, an American painter, at Looe in Cornwall with the hope of recovering. While there, Rice painted a portrait of her dressed in red, a vibrant colour that Mansfield liked and suggested herself. The Portrait of Katherine Mansfield is now held by the Museum of New Zealand Te Papa Tongarewa.

Rejecting the idea of staying in a sanatorium on the grounds that it would cut her off from writing, she moved abroad to avoid the English winter. She stayed at a half-deserted, cold hotel in Bandol, France, where she became depressed but continued to produce stories, including "Je ne parle pas français". "Bliss", the story that lent its name to her second collection of stories in 1920, was also published in 1918. Her health continued to deteriorate and she had her first lung haemorrhage in March.

By April, Mansfield's divorce from Bowden had been finalised, and she and Murry married, only to part again two weeks later. They came together again, however, and in March 1919 Murry became editor of The Athenaeum, a magazine for which Mansfield wrote more than 100 book reviews (collected posthumously as Novels and Novelists). During the winter of 1918–1919, she and Baker stayed in a villa in Sanremo, Italy. Their relationship came under strain during this period; after she wrote to Murry to express her feelings of depression, he stayed over Christmas. Although her relationship with Murry became increasingly distant after 1918 and the two often lived apart, this intervention of his spurred her, and she wrote "The Man Without a Temperament", the story of an ill wife and her long-suffering husband. Mansfield followed Bliss (1920), her first collection of short stories, with the collection The Garden Party and Other Stories, published in 1922.

In May 1921, Mansfield, accompanied by her friend Ida Baker, travelled to Switzerland to investigate the tuberculosis treatment of the Swiss bacteriologist Henri Spahlinge. From June 1921, Murry joined her, and they rented the Chalet des Sapins in the Montana region (now Crans-Montana) until January 1922. Baker rented separate accommodation in Montana village and worked at a clinic there. The Chalet des Sapins was only a "1/2 an hours scramble away" from the Chalet Soleil at Randogne, the home of Mansfield's first cousin once removed, the Australian-born writer Elizabeth von Arnim, who visited Mansfield and Murry often during this period. Von Arnim was the first cousin of Mansfield's father. They got on well, although Mansfield considered her wealthier cousin - who had in 1919 separated from her second husband Frank Russell, the elder brother of Bertrand Russell - to be rather patronising. It was a highly productive period of Mansfield's writing, for she felt she did not have much time left. "At the Bay", "The Doll's House", "The Garden Party" and "A Cup of Tea" were written in Switzerland.

=== Last year and death ===
Mansfield spent her last years seeking increasingly unorthodox cures for her tuberculosis. In February 1922, she went to Paris to have a controversial X-ray treatment from the Russian physician Ivan Manoukhin. The treatment was expensive and caused unpleasant side effects without improving her condition.

From 4 June to 16 August 1922, Mansfield and Murry returned to Switzerland, living in a hotel in Randogne. Mansfield finished "The Canary", the last short story she completed, on 7 July 1922. She wrote her will at the hotel on 14 August 1922. They went to London for six weeks before Mansfield, along with Ida Baker, moved to Fontainebleau, France, on 16 October 1922.

At Fontainebleau, Mansfield lived at G. I. Gurdjieff's Institute for the Harmonious Development of Man, where she was put under the care of Olgivanna Lazovitch Hinzenburg (who later married Frank Lloyd Wright). As a guest rather than a pupil of Gurdjieff, Mansfield was not required to take part in the rigorous routine of the institute, but she spent much of her time there with her mentor Alfred Richard Orage, and her last letters inform Murry of her attempts to apply some of Gurdjieff's teachings to her own life.

Mansfield suffered a fatal pulmonary haemorrhage on 9 January 1923, after running up a flight of stairs. She died within the hour, and was buried at Cimetière d'Avon, Avon, near Fontainebleau. Because Murry forgot to pay for her funeral expenses, she initially was buried in a pauper's grave; when matters were rectified, her casket was moved to its current resting place.

Mansfield was a prolific writer in the final years of her life. Much of her work remained unpublished at her death, and Murry took on the task of editing and publishing it in two additional volumes of short stories (The Doves' Nest in 1923, and Something Childish in 1924); a volume of poems; The Aloe; Novels and Novelists; and collections of her letters and journals.

== Works ==
- In a German Pension (1911)
- Bliss and Other Stories (1920)
- The Garden Party and Other Stories (1922)
- The Doves' Nest and Other Stories (1923)
- Poems (1923)
- Something Childish and Other Stories (1924), first published in the U.S. as The Little Girl
- The Journal of Katherine Mansfield (1927, 1954)
- The Letters of Katherine Mansfield (2 vols, 1928–29)
- The Aloe (1930)
- Novels and Novelists (1930)
- The Short Stories of Katherine Mansfield (1937)
- The Scrapbook of Katherine Mansfield (1939)
- The Collected Stories of Katherine Mansfield (1945, 1974)
- Letters to John Middleton Murry, 1913–1922 (1951)
- The Urewera Notebook (1978), ISBN 0-19-558034-6
- The Critical Writings of Katherine Mansfield (1987), ISBN 0-312-17514-0
- The Collected Letters of Katherine Mansfield (4 vols, 1984–96)
  - Vol. 1, 1903–17, ISBN 0-19-812613-1
  - Vol. 2, 1918–19, ISBN 0-19-812614-X
  - Vol. 3, 1919–20, ISBN 0-19-812615-8
  - Vol. 4, 1920–21, ISBN 0-19-818532-4
- The Katherine Mansfield Notebooks (2 vols, 1997), ISBN 0-8166-4236-2
- The Montana Stories (2001, a collection of all the material written by Mansfield from June 1921 until her death), ISBN 978-1-903155-15-8
- The Collected Poems of Katherine Mansfield, edited by Gerri Kimber and Claire Davison, Edinburgh: Edinburgh University Press, [2016], ISBN 978-1-4744-1727-3

=== Short stories ===
- "The Tiredness of Rosabel" (1908)
- "Frau Brechenmacher attends a Wedding" (1910)
- "Germans at Meat" (1911 from In a German Pension)
- "A Birthday" (1911 from In a German Pension)
- "A Blaze" (1911 from In a German Pension)
- "A Truthful Adventure" (1911)
- "The Journey to Bruges" (1911)
- "How Pearl Button Was Kidnapped" (1912)
- "New Dresses" (1912)
- "The Little Girl" (1912)
- "The Woman at the Store" (1912)
- "Bains Turcs" (1913)
- "Millie" (1913)
- "Ole Underwood" (1913)
- "Pension Séguin" (1913)
- "Violet" (1913)
- "Something Childish But Very Natural" (1914)
- "The Apple-Tree" (1915)
- "The Little Governess" (1915)
- "Spring Pictures" (1915)
- "That Woman" (1916)
- "Last Words to Youth" (1916)
- "The Laurels" (1916)
- "A Dill Pickle" (1917)
- "Feuille d'Album" (1917)
- "Late at Night" (1917)
- "Pictures" (1917)
- "See-Saw" (1917)
- "The Black Cap" (1917)
- "Two Tuppenny Ones, Please" (1917)
- "Je ne parle pas français" (wr. 1918, published 1920)
- "Prelude" (1918)
- "Bliss" (1918)
- "Carnation" (1918)
- "A Suburban Fairy Tale" (1919)
- "The Wrong House" (1919)
- "Bank Holiday" (1920)
- "Miss Brill" (1920)
- "Mr Reginald Peacock's Day" (1920)
- "Poison" (1920)
- "Psychology" (1920)
- "Revelations" (1920)
- "Sun and Moon" (1920)
- "The Escape" (1920)
- "The Lady's Maid" (1920)
- "The Singing Lesson" (1920)
- "The Wind Blows" (1920)
- "The Young Girl" (1920)
- "This Flower" (1920)
- "An Ideal Family" (1921)
- "Marriage à la Mode" (1921)
- "The Voyage" (1921)
- "Her First Ball" (1921)
- "Mr and Mrs Dove" (1921)
- "Life of Ma Parker" (1921)
- "Sixpence" (1921)
- "The Daughters of the Late Colonel" (1921)
- "The Stranger" (1921)
- "The Man Without a Temperament" (1921)
- "Widowed" (1921)
- "At the Bay" (1922)
- "The Fly" (1922)
- "The Garden Party" (1922)
- "A Cup of Tea" (1922)
- "The Doll's House" (1922)
- "A Married Man's Story" (1923)
- "Honeymoon" (1923)
- "Taking the Veil" (1923)
- "The Canary" (1923)
- "An Indiscreet Journey" (1924)

== Legacy ==
Despite her many accolades, her work attracted at least one prominent detractor; Ernest Hemingway, in his 1960 short story anthology A Moveable Feast, famously compared her work to near beer.

=== Memorials and archives ===
The following high schools in New Zealand have a house named after Mansfield: Whangārei Girls' High School; Westlake Girls High School, and Macleans College in Auckland; Tauranga Girls' College; Wellington Girls' College; Rangiora High School in North Canterbury, New Zealand; Avonside Girls' High School in Christchurch; and Southland Girls' High School in Invercargill. She has also been honoured at Karori Normal School in Wellington, which has a stone monument dedicated to her with a plaque commemorating her work and her time at the school, and at Samuel Marsden Collegiate School (previously Fitzherbert Terrace School) with a painting, and an award in her name.

Her birthplace in Thorndon has been preserved as the Katherine Mansfield House and Garden, and the Katherine Mansfield Memorial Park in Fitzherbert Terrace is dedicated to her.

A Woman of Words is a stainless steel statue in Wellington, NZ that honors Mansfield's life and work.

There is the Résidence le Prieuré, Rue Katherine Mansfield in Avon/Fontainebleau, very near to the former monastery, the G. I. Gurdjieff's Institute, that is the place where she died. A street in Menton, France, where she lived and wrote, is named after her. An award, the Katherine Mansfield Menton Fellowship is offered annually to enable a New Zealand writer to work at her former home, the Villa Isola Bella. New Zealand's pre-eminent short story competition is named in her honour.

Archives of Mansfield material are held in the Alexander Turnbull Library in the National Library of New Zealand in Wellington, with other important holdings at the Newberry Library in Chicago, the Harry Ransom Humanities Research Center at the University of Texas, Austin and the British Library in London. There are smaller holdings at New York Public Library and other public and private collections. Mansfield's literary and personal papers and belongings at the Alexander Turnbull Library were added to the UNESCO Memory of the World Aotearoa New Zealand Ngā Mahara o te Ao register in 2015.

=== Queer icon ===
The Sapphic sensibilities of Mansfield's writing and the documentation of long-term female companionships have supported modern readings of Mansfield as an important part of queer history in New Zealand.

== Depictions in literature and the arts ==
=== Biographies ===
- Ruth Elvish Mantz & J. Middleton Murry, The Life of Katherine Mansfield, Constable & Co., 1933
- Antony Alpers, Katherine Mansfield, Knopf (U.S.), 1953 and Jonathan Cape (UK), 1954
- Leslie Moore (pseudonym of Ida Constance Baker), Katherine Mansfield: The Memories of LM, Michael Joseph, 1971
- Jeffrey Meyers, Katherine Mansfield: A Biography, New Directions (U.S.) and Hamish Hamilton (UK), 1978
- Antony Alpers, The Life of Katherine Mansfield, Oxford University Press, 1980
- Claire Tomalin, Katherine Mansfield: A Secret Life, Viking, 1987
- Jeffrey Meyers, Katherine Mansfield: A Darker View, Cooper Square Press, 2002
- Kathleen Jones, Katherine Mansfield: The Story-Teller, Viking Penguin, 2010
- Gerri Kimber, Katherine Mansfield: The Early Years, Edinburgh University Press, 2016
- Claire Harman, All Sorts of Lives: Katherine Mansfield and the Art of Risking Everything, Random House, 2023
- Gerri Kimber, Katherine Mansfield: A Hidden Life, Reaktion Books, 2025 ISBN 978-1836391623
- In 1980 italian author Pietro Citati wrote a short biography of Mansfield called “Vita breve di Katherine Mansfield” which won Premio Bagutta 1980

=== Film and television ===
- A Picture of Katherine Mansfield, a 1973 BBC television drama series, starring Vanessa Redgrave
  This six-part series includes depictions of Mansfield's life and adaptations of her short stories.
- Leave All Fair (1985), directed by John Reid, starring Jane Birkin as Mansfield
- A Portrait of Katherine Mansfield: The Woman and the Writer (1987), directed by Julienne Stretton
- The Life and Writings of Katherine Mansfield (2006), directed by Stacy Waymack Thornton
- Bliss (2011), a television biopic produced by Michele Fantl and directed by Fiona Samuel
  Depicts Mansfield's early beginnings as a writer in New Zealand; she is played by Kate Elliott.

=== Music ===
- In 2012, Italian singer-songwriter Giovanni Del Grillo dedicated to Manfield's last days in Fontainebleau the song 'La Terza Via', included in his first album 'Qui Frinisce Male'.

=== Theatre ===
- Katherine Mansfield 1888–1923, dance-drama premiered at the Cell Block Theatre, Sydney in 1978, with choreography by Margaret Barr and script by Joan Scott, which was spoken by the dancers, an actor and actress. Two dancers played Mansfield simultaneously, as "Katherine Mansfield had spoken of herself at times as a multiple person".
- The Rivers of China by Alma De Groen, premiered at the Sydney Theatre Company in 1987; published by Currency Press.
- Jones & Jones by Vincent O'Sullivan, a Downstage commission for the Mansfield centenary in 1989; published by Victoria University Press.

=== Fiction ===
J. M. Murry wrote in Reminiscences of D. H. Lawrence (1933): "I have been told, by one who should know, that the character of Gudrun in Women in Love was intended for a portrait of Katherine [Mansfield]. If this is true, it confirms me in my belief that Lawrence had curiously little understanding of her... And yet he was very fond of her, as she was of him." Murry said that the fictional incident in the chapter "Gudrun in the Pompadour" – when Gudrun tears a letter from Julian Halliday's hands and storms out – was based on a true event at the Café Royal.

The character Sybil in the 1932 novel But for the Grace of God, by Mansfield's friend J. W. N. Sullivan, has several resemblances to Mansfield. Musically trained, she goes to the south of France without her husband but with a female friend, and lapses into an incurable illness that kills her.

The character Kathleen in Evelyn Schlag's 1987 novel Die Kränkung (published in English as Quotations of a Body) is based on Mansfield.

C. K. Stead's 2004 novel Mansfield depicts the writer in the period 1915–18.

Kevin Boon's 2011 novella Kezia is based on Mansfield's childhood in New Zealand.

Andrew Crumey's 2023 novel Beethoven's Assassins has a chapter featuring Mansfield and A. R. Orage at George Gurdjieff's institute in France.

==== Works featuring Mansfield ====
- Mansfield, A Novel by C. K. Stead, Harvill Press, 2004, ISBN 978-1-84343-176-3
- In Pursuit: The Katherine Mansfield Story Retold, 2010, a novel by Joanna FitzPatrick
- Katherine's Wish by Linda Lappin, Wordcraft of Oregon, 2008, ISBN 978-1-877655-58-6
- Dear Miss Mansfield: A Tribute to Kathleen Mansfield Beauchamp, 1989, a short story collection by Witi Ihimaera
- My Katherine Mansfield Project by Kirsty Gunn, ISBN 978-1-910749-04-3
- Spring by Ali Smith, Penguin, 2019, ISBN 978-0-241-97335-6
- Beethoven's Assassins by Andrew Crumey, Dedalus, 2023, ISBN 978-1-912868-23-0
- "My Little Governess" in Virginia's Sisters: An Anthology of Women's Writing, Aurora Metro Books, 2023, ISBN 9781912430789

"A Scent of Mimosa" by Francis King in The Times Anthology of Ghost Stories,1975, ISBN 9780224011952

=== Adaptations of Mansfield's work ===
- "The Woman at the Store", an episode from the 1976 anthology television series Winners & Losers was adapted from "The Woman at the Store" by Peter Hansard and Ian Mune.
- "Chai Ka Ek Cup", an episode from the 1986 Indian anthology television series Katha Sagar was adapted from "A Cup of Tea" by Shyam Benegal.
- Mansfield with Monsters (Steam Press, 2012), Katherine Mansfield with Matt Cowens and Debbie Cowens
- The Doll's House (1973), directed by Rudall Hayward
- "A Dill Pickle", a chamber opera by Matt Malsky was adapted from Mansfield's short story of the same name. It was premiered in October 2021 by the Worcester Chamber Music Society (Worcester MA US) and released on compact disc.

== See also ==
- New Zealand literature
- New Zealand Post Katherine Mansfield Prize
- List of Bloomsbury Group people
