= The Nation and Athenaeum =

British literary magazine

- Founder: Richard Steele
- Founded: 1921
- Ceased publication: 1931(absorbed into the Labour weekly the New Statesman)
- OCLC number: 715567055

The Nation and Athenaeum, or simply The Nation, was a United Kingdom political weekly newspaper with a Liberal/Labour viewpoint. It was formed in 1921 from the merger of the Athenaeum, a literary magazine published in London since 1828, and the smaller and newer The Nation, edited by Henry William Massingham.

The enterprise was purchased by a group led by the economist John Maynard Keynes in 1923. From then on, it carried numerous articles by Keynes.

From 1923 to 1930, the editor was Liberal economist Hubert Douglas Henderson, and the literary editor was Leonard Woolf, who would help impecunious young authors, including Robert Graves and E. M. Forster he knew through the Hogarth Press by commissioning them to write reviews and articles; there were others, such as Edwin Muir who had come to his attention at The Nation and whose work he would publish at Hogarth.

Other contributors included Edmund Blunden, H. E. Bates, H. N. Brailsford, J. A. Hobson, Harold Laski, David Garnett, Aldous Huxley (under the pseudonym "Autolux"), Charlotte Mew, Edith Sitwell, T.S. Eliot, Virginia Woolf, and G. D. H. Cole.

In 1931, it was absorbed into the Labour weekly the New Statesman, which was known as the New Statesman and Nation until 1964.
