= Niel Wright =

New Zealand poet

Frank William Nielsen "Niel" Wright (30 September 1933 – 28 November 2024) was a New Zealand poet, literary critic, bibliographer, publisher, and cultural and political commentator. His major piece of work is his epic poem The Alexandrians, mostly self published in 120 books between 1961 and 2007 and totaling some 36,000 lines. The early editions were published by Pegasus Press, Christchurch. He then self published around 4,000 Post-Alexandrian Poems totaling over 30,000 lines, of which most are epigrams, triolets or extended triolets. He has also published extensive notes to The Alexandrians.

== Life ==
Born in Sydenham Christchurch of mixed French, Scandinavian and English ancestry. His first school was Elmwood in Merivale, his second St Albans. He then attended Christchurch Boys' High School.

Wright moved to Wellington in 1953, at first off and on, then permanently from the 1960s. He attended Victoria University of Wellington, earning a BA and MA (Hons) in English, followed by a PhD on Beowulf. His career was spent in the New Zealand public service.

He was married with one son, one daughter and four grandchildren. He lived in Wellington.

Niel Wright set up the Poetry Archive Charitable Trust with Michael O'Leary a fellow trustee (who came up with the idea for the Poetry Archive of New Zealand Aotearoa in 1999) and received public funding for the Winter Readings poetry series at The City Gallery in Wellington from 2006-2008. Niel wrote a history of PANZA, The Early History of the Poetry Archive of New Zealand Aotearoa, 2010. He ran the Poetry Archive of New Zealand Aotearoa from his home in 2010 until his death.

Wright died on 28 November 2024, at the age of 91.

== Literary output ==
Wright published over 1,000 entries listed in the National Library of New Zealand. Almost all are self-published under his imprints Cultural and Political Booklets and Original Books, Wellington.

As a publisher his Original Books list includes Ruth Gilbert, M L Nicholls, Michael O'Leary, Mark Pirie, Barry Morrall, Dennis List, Cameron La Follette (USA), Harry Ricketts, Linzy Forbes, Ivy Gibbs, R G Park, Nelson Wattie, John Pine Snadden and Heine translations by John Liddell Kelly.

His essays survey New Zealand poetry from 1898 on, covering mainly Georgian but also a few earlier and later writers. From 1985, he has focused on the Elizabethan and Jacobean dramatists, and since 2002, increasingly on Shakespeare. His major books are Shakespeare's Ongoing Composition (2008) and Argybargy and the Big D (2009).

He has published essays on numerous New Zealand writers including Maude Ruby Basham (Aunt Daisy), James K. Baxter, George Bouzaid, Alan Claudius Brassington, Alan Brunton, Charles Brasch, Alfred Edward Caddick, Alex Calder, Alistair Te Ariki Campbell, Ronald Brian Castle, R. E. Coury, Charles Doyle, Kate Gerard, Patricia Godsiff, C. W. Grace, Arnold Grierson Lamont Cork, D'Arcy Cresswell, Peter Crisp, Allen Curnow, Eileen Duggan, E. L. Eyre, Bernard Gadd, Michele Leggott, Arthur Frederick Thomas Chorlton, Leigh Davis, A. R. D. Fairburn, Gerald Fitzgerald, Patricia Fry, Ruth Gilbert, Denis Glover, Alexander Connell Hanlon, Robin Hyde, Noel Farr Hoggard, Louis Johnson, John Liddell Kelly, Dennis List, Iain Lonie, Bill Manhire, Katherine Mansfield, Charles Allan Marris, Frank McKay, Philip Mincher, Barry Mitcalfe, Geoffrey Potocki de Montalk, Peter Munz, Walter Edward Murphy, Marjory Lydia Nicholls, Esma North, Victor O'Leary, W. H. Oliver, Vincent O'Sullivan, Charles Stuart Perry, Mark Pirie, Mary E. Richmond, Harry Ricketts, Betty Riddell, J. H. E.Schroder, Rosemary Seymour, Kendrick Smithyman, Charles Spear, C. K. Stead, John Pine Snadden, J. E. Weir, Karl Wolfskehl and the Australian writer Pamela Travers.

Among the British authors he has written on are Rupert Brooke, Robert Browning, R. G. Collingwood, Frances Cornford, William Davenant, Richard Edwardes, T. S. Eliot, John Maxwell Edmonds, George Rostrevor Hamilton, Thomas Hardy, John Marston, Thomas Middleton, John Milton, Anthony Munday, Wilfred Owen, George Peele, Geoffrey Pollett, William Rowley, Percy Bysshe Shelley, Anthony Thwaite, Alfred, Lord Tennyson and William Wordsworth. He has also written on Goethe.

Among the New Zealand bibliographers and critics he has written on are Peter Alcock, Rowan Gibbs, Don McKenzie and Joan Stevens. He has published bibliographies of Ivan Bootham, Jeremy Commons, Mark Pirie and Michael O'Leary.

Wright's published works include plays, filmscripts, novels, short stories and two verse novellas.

His earliest plays date from the 1950s. From 1984 all his plays have been written in verse. They include Orestes in Phthia, Apollonius at Rome and Women of Sparta. He has also written three filmscripts: Mysterious Eve, Wolf's Gorge, or Operation Fullscale, and Across the Ningthi. His novels include Underprivileged Lovers, Strangers in the Blood, Caisson, and The Last Time I Saw Turfit. His latest is Weston Burley's Business in Great Waters (2007). He has also written The Fall of the Modern West, a book on the philosophy of history.

He has published two works of literary autobiography: Brilliantly Wright (1989) and Being, Obsession and Besetment (2007).

In 1966, Wright had a poetry collection, The Imaginings of the Heart, published by The Chiron Press in Kansas, USA.

In 2002, Niel Wright’s verse novella The Sun Wheel was set to music by Ivan Bootham and performed before the opera The Death of Venus, of which Jeremy Commons was co-librettist. Bootham also previously set to music Niel’s Three Lejjoon Poems (2000), a short song cycle and read his poetry on YouTube.

In 2004, Earl of Seacliff Art Workshop reprinted his collection, Only A Bullet Will Stop Me Now.

Wright's The Pop Artist's Garland: Selected Poems 1952–2009, drawing on his epic poem The Alexandrians as well as his post-Alexandrian work was published by HeadworX and edited by Mark Pirie.

Critic Gill Ward wrote of The Pop Artist's Garland: "You will get the feel of this important and prolific poet who is largely underrepresented in New Zealand anthologies. Pirie has done Wright and his readers a brave justice in bringing so much of Wright's work to our attention by publishing this selection."

In 2026, The Night Press, Wellington, published a new edition of Wright's 1966 American book The Imaginings of the Heart to mark 60 years since its publication. In November that year, Earl of Seacliff Art Workshop published Wright's Selected Post Alexandrian Poems edited by Mark Pirie, a representative sampling of his later work from the last 16 years of his life.

Wright is a member of the Poets XI at the Longroom, Basin Reserve, 31 October 2010, a fictional team selected by cricket editor Mark Pirie and published as a commemorative book by Earl of Seacliff Art Workshop.

== Awards ==
- Bevan Brown Memorial Prize for Classics, 1951
- W E Collins Prize in English Literature, 1965

== Bibliography ==
Poetry

- The Imaginings of the Heart (Kansas, USA: The Chiron Press, 1966; Wellington: The Night Press, new edition 2026).
- The Alexandrians, Books 1-120 (Christchurch: Pegasus Press; Wellington: Cultural and Political Booklets, 1961-2007).
- The New Palladus: Epigrams from Books 1-60 of The Alexandrians (Wellington: Cultural and Political Booklets, 1985).
- Gazeless in Gaza: Selected Poems 1950-1985 (Wellington: Cultural and Political Booklets, 1986).
- The Book of 131 Triolets (Wellington: Cultural and Political Booklets, 1987).
- Canterbury Prospect: Memoirs of a Landscape (Wellington: Cultural and Political Booklets, 1987).
- Wellington Panorama: Hints on Touring Wellington with artwork by Allan Potter (Wellington: Original Books, 1990).
- Only a Bullet Will Stop Me Now (Paekakariki: Earl of Seacliff Art Workshop, 2004).
- The Pop Artist’s Garland: Selected Poems 1952-2009 edited by Mark Pirie (HeadworX Publishers: Wellington, 2010).
- Post Alexandrian Poems (Wellington: Cultural and Political Booklets, 2008-no end date found).
- Coasting Along Without Drive: An Essay in Cryptotalk (Paekakariki: Earl of Seacliff Art Workshop, 2018).
- Selected Post Alexandrian Poems edited by Mark Pirie (Paekakariki: Earl of Seacliff Art Workshop, 2026).

Novels

- Underprivileged Lovers (Wellington: Original Books, 1987).
- Strangers in the Blood (Wellington: Cultural and Political Booklets, 1988).
- The Last Time I Saw Turfit (Wellington: Cultural and Political Booklets, 1988).
- Caisson (Wellington: Cultural and Political Booklets, 1996).
- Weston Burley’s Business in Great Waters (Wellington: Cultural and Political Booklets, 2007).

Plays

- A Man of Conscience (Christchurch: Pegasus Press, 1961).

Autobiography

- Brilliantly Wright (Wellington: Cultural and Political Booklets, 1989).
- Being, Obsession and Besetment (Wellington: Cultural and Political Booklets, 2007).

As editor

- The Street by J H E Schroder (Christchurch: Pegasus Press, 1962).
- Heine Poems translated by John Liddell Kelly (Wellington: Cultural and Political Booklets, 1985).
- Con Art: Selected Poems by Michael O’Leary (Wellington: Original Books, 1997).
- John Pine Snadden’s World War II Poems (Wellington: Cultural and Political Booklets, 2009).
- Complete Poems by M. L. Nicholls, 2 vols. (Wellington: Original Books, 2009).

Non-fiction/Criticism

- Experiment in Spelling (Christchurch: Pegasus Press, 1962).
- Ruth Gilbert: An Account of Her Poetry (Wellington: Cultural and Political Booklets, 1985).
- The Fall of the Modern West (Wellington: Cultural and Political Booklets, 1993).
- The Unlikeliest Litterateur: Mary E Richmond (Wellington: Cultural and Political Booklets, 1995).
- Blood in Her Cup: A History of the Muse in Aotearoa (Wellington: Cultural and Political Booklets, 1996).
- Of Critics and Teachers of Poetry in Aotearoa (Wellinton: Cultural and Political Booklets, 1996).
- A Reading of the Poetry of Count Geoffrey Potocki de Montalk (Wellington: Cultural and Political Booklets, 1996).
- Putting Stead to the Question (Wellington: Cultural and Political Booklets, 1996).
- A Reading (in Part) of the Poetry of Louis Johnson (Wellington: Cultural and Political Booklets, 1997).
- Wellington Poetry in the 1960s, a memoir (Wellington: Cultural and Political Booklets, 1997).
- Two Wellington Poets: W H Oliver and Vincent O’Sullivan (Wellington: Cultural and Political Booklets, 1998).
- Karl Wolfskehl Among the Kiwis, a memoir (Wellington: Cultural and Political Booklets, 1999).
- Theories of Style in the Schroder-Marris School of Poets in Aotearoa (Wellington: Cultural and Political Booklets, 2001).
- A R D Fairburn and the Women Poets of 1948 in Aotearoa (Wellington: Cultural and Political Booklets, 2007).
- Further Readings in the Poetry of Louis Johnson (Wellington: Cultural and Political Booklets, 2010).

Bibliographies

- Ivan Bootham: A Descriptive Bibliography (Wellington: Cultural and Political Booklets, 1998).
- Jeremy Commons, Musicologist and Impresario: An Initial Bibliography (Wellington: Original Books, 2002).
- A Comprehensive Bibliography of Michael (John) O'Leary, 1950- as Author, Editor and Publisher (Wellington: Cultural and Political Booklets, 2000).
- Bibliography of Mark Pirie's poetry 1992-2014 (Wellington: Original Books, 2015).

Notable anthology inclusions:

- JAAM 21 "Greatest Hits": An Anthology of Writing 1984-2004 (Wellington: HeadworX/ESAW/JAAM, 2004).
- 50 Poems by 50 Poets: Recent New Zealand Poetry (Brisbane: papertiger media, 2004 CD-ROM; Paekakariki: Earl of Seacliff Art Workshop, 2026 archival edition).
- ‘A Tingling Catch’: A Century of New Zealand Cricket Poems 1864-2009 (Wellington: HeadworX Publishers, 2010).
- Rail Poems of New Zealand Aotearoa (Wellington: Poetry Archive of NZ Aotearoa / Earl of Seacliff Art Workshop, 2010).
- The International Literary Quarterly
- Of Paekakariki (Paekakariki: Earl of Seacliff Art Workshop, 2015).
- From the Fringe of Heaven: Titirangi Poets (Auckland: Printable Reality, 2022).
- Poets XI (Paekakariki: Earl of Seacliff Art Workshop, 2026).

== Reviews and critical studies ==
- Peter Dronke, Reviews, Landfall, September 1964, pp. 277–280.
- George W. Scandrett, Review, Christchurch Star, 8 May 1967.
- John Sebastian Hales, An introductory essay: Niel Wright and his epic, Wellington, 1976.
- James Bertram, "The Last Maker", New Zealand Listener, 12 August 1978, p. 71.
- Robert Johnson, "Extracts from a growing epic", Palmerston North Evening Standard, 12 September 1980.
- Chris Hilliard, "Mad by Auckland Standards", The Pander 3, Autumn 1998, Auckland.
- Joe Wylie, Review, Takahe 54, 2005.
- Catherine Robertson, "The Perverse Poet", The Dominion Post "Indulgence" magazine, 29 December 2007, p. 3.
- Nelson Wattie, Poetry Archive opening and book launch, Poetry Notes, Winter 2010, vol. 1, no. 2, p.3.
- Patricia Prime, Review, Takahe 71, 2010, pp. 72-73.
- Hamesh Wyatt, Review, Otago Daily Times, 14 August 2010, p. 49.
- Iain Sharp, "Renewing the Prosody", Landfall 221, May 2011, pp. 187-190.
- In memory of Niel Wright 1933-2024, Poetry Archive of New Zealand Aotearoa
