= Ruth Gilbert (poet) =

New Zealand poet (1917–2016)

Florence Ruth Gilbert ONZM (26 March 1917 – 11 April 2016) was a New Zealand poet whose work was published in New Zealand and other Commonwealth countries. She was born in Greytown and educated at Hamilton High School and the Otago School of Physiotherapy.

Her poetry appeared first in magazines and anthologies and later in ten personal collections. She was awarded the Jessie Mackay Memorial Award for verse three times. She has served as President of New Zealand PEN and the New Zealand Women Writers' Society.

In the 2002 Queen's Birthday and Golden Jubilee Honours, she was appointed an Officer of the New Zealand Order of Merit, for services to poetry.

== Family background and early life ==
Ruth Gilbert comes from the same family as the librettist W.S. Gilbert (the surname was originally French). Her father, Henry George Gilbert, was born 1881 in Cust, Canterbury, into a farming family. In his youth, having left primary school and home, he worked his way around the world, visiting relatives in Hampshire, England. He enlisted in the Mounted Rifles in the Boer War at 19, giving a false age. He was educated as a late entrant at Otago University, completing the work for an MA about 1914, but was never awarded the degree as he had not matriculated. Responding to an invitation to train as a Presbyterian minister (although an Anglican by upbringing) he spent four years at Knox College. He studied Hebrew and Greek. He married in 1914, and in 1917 went to France as a padre with the artillery with the rank of Captain. He was the Minister of the St. Andrew's Presbyterian Church Hamilton 1925–1946. After retiring in 1946, he lived in Hamilton, dying in 1954. He played the violin and the cello and was a violin maker (luthier).

Ruth's mother, Florence Margaret Carrington, was born in 1886 in Dunedin. Her father was an artist, G. W. Carrington, and her mother was Irish. A musician, she became a music teacher and was official accompanist for visiting artists in Dunedin. She played the piano, pipe organ and cello. Marrying in 1914, she had four children, of whom Ruth was the second.

Ruth Gilbert was born in 1917 at Greytown in the Wairarapa during her mother's visit to the Featherston Military Camp where Captain Gilbert was training. She lived until 8 years old in Invercargill; thereafter in Hamilton city overlooking the river from 1925 till 1935. She was educated at Hamilton West Primary School and at Hamilton Girls' High School. In 1935 she trained at what is now the Dunedin School of Physiotherapy, completing her diploma in 1938. During 1938 to 1946 she was employed in the Waikato Hospital, Wellington Hospital (Otaki Branch, where she was in charge of the Physiotherapy Department), and Christchurch Hospital. Most of her experience was with young orthopaedic and geriatric patients. Ruth returned home for four years to nurse her mother, who died of cancer in 1943.

For seven years, she was engaged to Rev. John Dinsmore Johnston, born 19 November 1912. Johnston was Irish and Ruth Gilbert's poem "Leprechaun" written 1939 in Irish dialect may relate to him. Johnston studied at Knox College 1937–1938 when presumably he and Ruth Gilbert met. Johnston left New Zealand to serve as a missionary in China, arriving there on 13 March 1941. He was interned during the Japanese occupation of Hong Kong December 1941 – September 1945. He returned to New Zealand on 24 October 1945.

Ruth Gilbert married John Bennett Mackay, a physician specialising in chest diseases. Their marriage took place on VJ Day, the day the Pacific war ended, when "All the bells were ringing." Their children were Michael (born 1946), Deirdre (1951), Charles (1954), and Pippa (1957). Ruth travelled for a year with her family to England and France in 1953, when John received his MRCP degree. His FRCP was conferred by the College later. She and John made four trips to Samoa on professional business. In 1975-7 she made a trip on her own to New York City to visit her son Michael who was working as a physician there.

== Literary works ==
Ruth Gilbert is a poet, and her public oeuvre is almost totally poetry. Her published poetry dates from 1938 to 2005. Some uncollected poetry was published when she was a schoolgirl, but the publications have not been retrieved. Other uncollected jeux d'esprit exist in letters held at the Alexander Turnbull Library and in private hands.

Her published poetry includes several collections. Selected Poems 2009 runs to 101 pages, Collected Poems to 148 pages, Complete Early Poems to 104 small A5 pages, Complete Sappho Poems to 76 pages, Lazrarus and Other Poems to 40 pages, The Sunlt Hour to 47 pages, The Luthier and Other Poems to 55 pages, The Lovely Acres and Other Poems to 68 pages, Talismans and Later Poems to 20 pages, so not including the selected and collected editions or Talismans that is 390 pages in total. Many of the poems are stand-alone works, but from 1947 Ruth Gilbert was given to writing poem sequences, which often appeared as stand-alone publication in full or in part in magazines.

People associated with Gilbert's work included C.A. Marris, Pat Lawlor, Charles Brasch, Mervyn Taylor, A.R.D. Fairburn, J. H. E. Schroder, Jonathan Bennett, Robert Chapman, Celia and Louis Johnson, Willow Macky, Lorna and Monte Holcroft, Professor Ian Gordon, Professor Joan Stevens (an acquaintance from school days at Hamilton), Margaret J. O'Donnell (Britain), Niel Wright, Sylvia Ashton-Warner, Jean and James Munro Bertram, Frank McKay, Helen Shaw, Denis Glover, Lauris Edmond, Ralph Park, Riemke Ensing, Meg and Alistair Campbell, Sam Hunt, Jack Ross, Jan Kemp, Peter Smart, Robin Dudding, Bill Wieben, Ian Wedde, Harvey McQueen, Derek Bolt, C. K. Stead, Michele Leggott, Jenny Bornholdt, Terry Locke, Mary Barnard (Oregon), Dr Michael O'Leary, Mark Pirie, Denis Welsh, Cameron La Follette (Oregon), Ian Lancashire (Toronto), her commercial publishers A.H. and A.W. Reed and Allen & Unwin, and her many readers.

== Literary career ==
Ruth Gilbert's earliest verse was written about 1926; she was first published in the Hamilton High School magazine in the 1930s, but copies have yet to be found.

Interviewed in 1991, Ruth Gilbert said that as a child of the manse her earliest influences came from hymns and the Bible. "My father recited poems to all the family – and listening to him read from the Bible Sunday after Sunday gave me an ear for words and their music." Her first attempts at rhyme were a source of merriment to her family. One of her earliest memories is being laughed at by a family group on the veranda of her grandparents' place for parodying a hymn which goes:

The great physician now is near
The sympathising Jesus ...

Her own version in tune with the original went:

Oh little fly oh don't you die
I'll ask the Lord to help you.

She has an equally clear recollection of the first original poem she wrote when she was 11. It read:

A mass of brightest gold was she
And not as any other tree
For she was golden as the sun
That through the branches played and run.

"I knew the last line was wrong but didn't know what to do about it."

Many years later the poem reappeared, much altered as "The Wattle Tree" and started with the lines:

You blazing there, a living core of light,
Were the first poem a child longed to write.
A spendthrift gold among the careful green ...

At 12 she started to read other people's poetry, an interest that was encouraged by the wealth of reading material at the manse. "My father had a study which had books from floor to ceiling and, provided I had clean hands, I was allowed to read what I liked." An early favourite was Thomas Wyatt and later she enjoyed Yeats, Graves and many of the French poets. "The music and artistry of their work stayed with me for the rest of my life."

Otherwise Ruth Gilbert's first publications were in 1941 in the Evening Post and in Art in New Zealand. "Joseph" appears in Lyric Poems of New Zealand 1928–1942, edited by C. A. Marris.

A 1966 interview report Hard Lines for Women Writers states: "Ruth Gilbert, who wrote verse from about nine, kept black books with "the most ghastly verse" and contributed to her high school magazine, was in her early 20s when a friend suggested she should show her verse to C. A. Marris." Marris, then writing in the Evening Post as Percy Flage, told her: "You can write, but you mustn't send anything out till I tell you." He got her work first into the Evening Post, over the initial "R", and later into Art in New Zealand and New Zealand Best Poems.

"Mr Marris has been much criticised," Ruth Gilbert said. "But I feel he was genuinely interested in New Zealand literature and was only trying to get writers published."

F.W. Nielson Wright traces to the Evening Post 1941–1944 the four poems in More Early Poems 1939–1944 sourced to the Evening Post as well as three others: "Joseph", "Worshipper" and "Street at Dusk" that appear in Lazarus and Other Poems, and one never reprinted by Ruth Gilbert, the poem "Aged Eighty-Three".

Ruth Gilbert had poems published in the following:

- Art in New Zealand December 1941
- Yearbook of the Arts in New Zealand 1948, 1949
- Arts Year Book 1950, 1951
- New Zealand Best Poems 1942, 1943
- New Zealand Poetry Yearbook 1951, 1955, 1957–8
- Poetry New Zealand Vol. 1 1971, Vol. 4 1979
- The New Zealand Listener from July 1950, 1951 (twice), 1952, 1957, 1958 (twice), 1960, 1961 (twice), 1962 (four times), 1963 (three, possibly five times), 1964 (twice), 1965, 1966 (possibly twice), 1967, 1968 (twice), 1969 (twice), 1972, 1973, 1975, 1990.

Selected Poems 1941–1998 was compiled in 1998 by Ruth Gilbert, at the age of 80, with the co-operation of an editor, Derek Bolt. It is significant in that it presents the early poems and the Sappho poems as part and parcel of her oeuvre.

== Themes and critical recognition ==
From 1941 to 1966, Ruth Gilbert had an established literary reputation. After 1966 her opportunities to publish in established outlets shrank. Her efforts to find commercial publishers for collections to be called The Lovely Acres, The Tenth Muse and Selected and Collected Poems were unsuccessful, and from 1984 she relied on small publishers.

Prior to 1966, reviews of her poetry may have been more numerous in the provincial presses of New Zealand and Britain than have so far come to light. But since 1966 reviews and interviews have appeared by James Bertram, Heather McPherson, Lauris Edmond, Derek Bolt, Deirdre Mackay and others.

Ruth Gilbert always shows as a traditionalist poet who moves freely and comfortably within formalism, notably lyrical and melodious, usually dramatic and narrative, rarely explicitly confessional.

In her brief autobiographical comments, Ruth Gilbert makes it clear that from earliest childhood she was aware of religion and nature, and religious material and the natural world are a staple throughout her poetry, so overwhelmingly that people may read and see her as a devout Christian. But she herself says a very early poem of hers parodies a Christian hymn in commenting on the natural world. All her use of religious material moves in the same direction, even for some readers to the point of comic parody. A comic poem called "Aged Eighty Four", published in 1944, was inspired by the experience of nursing her mother while she was dying of cancer. It is consistent with her refusal to express grief as a reaction to the natural world. She knows the reality of human life as thoroughly as anybody, but she holds and expresses confidently that the natural world is a positive good.

In her 1970 study of contemporary poets, Professor Joan Stevens places Ruth Gilbert in the Georgian tradition.

Ruth Gilbert's talent is for the straightforward evocation of brief moments of emotion, particularly those of the child or the woman, within the tradition of the romantic lyric. For her, the poetry seems to lie more in the words themselves than in the experiences; she is willing to take over poetic resonances established by others, rebuilding then for her own purposes:

How steeped in beauty these old names are;
Saffron, Sandalwood, Cinnabar ...

This is a Georgian attitude, resulting in low-pressure poems of simple statement. If she has a poetic ancestor, it is Walter de la mare, who is close at hand in "Phobia". "Legendary Lady" and "Portrait."
Some of these moments of emotion are as imagined in the lives of others, particularly within Bible stories, where such figures as Joseph, Rachel and Lazarus are sympathetically probed. Some are personal to the poet, as "Sanatorium" and, nearer to the bone, "Fall Out". Some are crystallised into small perfection, as in "Li Po", "Metamorphosis" and "The Trees of Corot."
Ruth Gilbert has made several attempts to increase her scale, by binding lyrics into a sequence. Of these the most successful is "The Luthier", which, even if conventionally romantic in essence, has the merit of a more vigorous vocabulary, and more complex rhythms than she has commanded elsewhere.

At her best, she can set up quiet ripples – never disturbing ones – which take her meaning beyond the sensitive but unadventurous moment which she describes. Her later work, however, suggests a growing awareness of the forces to be tapped when the form has been hammered out by the pressure of the content and is not a mere relaxed handling of old words and shapes. There may therefore be different work ahead of her. But her natural place is with the Georgians.

Niel Wright has also written on Ruth Gilbert's Georgianism.

Ruth Gilbert's "Lazarus" sequence was singled out for praise in a 1990 entry on her work. "The poems are quiet, lyric, occasional, sometimes slight, about music and biblical stories and places – NY, Samoa, England. But the earliest post-war poems about Lazarus are striking. In a group of moving poems about birth ('Quickening', 'Justification', 'Still-Born': 'O child who did not cry, you cry for ever/ Through all my nights'); about woman's need for love, and loss of it; about woman's silence ('She Who is Silent', 'By Bread Alone'), and about facing death of a loved one: 'Death is of the Grass'."

Critics have remarked on her lyricism and mastery of form. "She uses conventional, usually rhymed forms confidently and often elegantly, with an essentially lyrical talent. Some notable poems on her war experience, when she practised as a physiotherapist in the Wellington region, are included in Complete Early Poems 1938–44 (1994). Her work includes autobiographical sequences ("The Sunlit Hour", 1955, "The Luthier", 1966) and travel sequences ("Tusitala's Island" in Collected Poems, 1984). Her references are often biblical, as in the anthologised "Leah", or classical, as in the extensive set of short poems on Sappho themes written after she learnt Greek at the age of 75 (Breathings, 1992)."

In 1985 Niel Wright published the only book-length survey of Ruth Gilbert's poetry in print to that date. Subsequently he updated coverage to include the early poems published in 1988. In 2007 he published at length a resource book on Ruth Gilbert's career. He has also written a book-length discussion of the cultural milieu of the leading literary editors 1922–1949 Marris and Schroder and their favourite poets Ruth Gilbert, Eileen Duggan and Robin Hyde.

== Works by Ruth Gilbert ==
=== Articles, essays and reviews ===
- Review of Willow Macky's book of poems Ego of Youth in Art in New Zealand 1942 (no 58) p.12
- "The 42nd International PEN Congress, Sydney, Australia", Landfall 125, March 1978
- "Remembering John Schroder 1885–1980" Landfall 136, December 1980

=== Major poetry collections ===
- Lazarus and Other Poems 1949
- The Sunlit Hour 1955
- The Luthier 1966
- Collected Poems 1984
- Complete Early Poems, 1938–1944: With Six Later Pieces 1994
- Complete Sappho Poems 1998
- Selected Poems 1941–1998

=== Limited collections, booklets and reprints ===
- Early Poems 1938–1944 1988
- More Early Poems 1939–1944 1988
- Breathings 1992
- Dream, Black Night's Child 1993
- Gongyla Remembers 1994
- The Sunlit Hour 2008
- The Lovely Acres and Other Poems 2008
- Lazarus and Other Poems 2009
- Talismans and Later Poems 2009

=== Poem sequences ===
(Available separately or in part)

- "Lazarus" (sequence): in Quill 1948 magazine of the Society of Women Writers and Artists, Landfall March 1948, Voices 133 Spring 1948, Lazarus and Other Poems, Collected Poems, Selected Poems
- "Sanatorium": in Lazarus and Other Poems 1949
- "Leah" (sequence): in Lazarus and Other Poems, Collected Poems, Selected Poems
- "Overheard in a Garden": in Lazarus and Other Poems
- "The Blossom of the Branches": in full in The Sunlit Hour and Collected Poems, in part in An Anthology of Commonwealth Verse and Selected Poems
- "The Slow Years Pass": in full in The Sunlit Hour and in an audio/radio presentation, one poem only in Selected Poems
- "And There Shall be no More Death": in full in The Sunlit Hour, in part in Representative Poetry Online from 2009, in part in Collected Poems
- "The Luthier" (sequence): in full in The Luthier and Other Poems, Collected Poems, Selected Poems, and in three audio/radio presentations
- 'Fall-out": in full in The Luthier and Other Poems
- "Poems on a Death": in full in The Luthier and Other Poems
- "To Many Stories High": in part in Landfall 117 March 1976, in full in Collected Poems, The Lovely Acres and Other Poems, in part with an addition in Selected Poems
- "The Lovely Acres": in full in Collected Poems, The Lovely Acres and Other Poems, in part in Selected Poems
- "Tusitala's Island" in part in Landfall 127 September 1978, in full in Collected Poems and in The Lovely Acres and Other Poems, in part in Selected Poems
- "Talismans": in part in Islands 3, 8 October 1980, in full in Collected Poems and with others in Talismans and Later Poems, in part in Selected Poems
- "To a Black Poet": in Collected Poems, The Lovely Acres and Other Poems
- "Attitudes": in Collected Poems, The Lovely Acres and Other Poems

=== Anthologies ===
- Lyric Poems of New Zealand 1928–1942
- "Women Poets of New Zealand" in the American literary quarterly Voices No. 133 Spring 1948
- Jindyworobak Anthology 1951 Trans-Tasman Issue
- Poems 1953 Society of New Zealand Women Writers and Artists
- An Anthology of New Zealand Verse 1956
- Delta Anthology of New Zealand Poetry [sound recording] read by William Austin, Tim Eliott, Dorothy McKegg, Anne Flannery 1961
- An Anthology of Commonwealth Verse 1963
- New Zealand Love Poems 1977
- Private Gardens 1977
- The Japonica Sings 1979
- A Cage of Words 1980
- Mystical Choices 1981
- Penguin Book of New Zealand Verse 1985
- My Heart Goes Swimming 1996
- Oxford Anthology of New Zealand Poetry in English 1997
- Jewels in the Water 2000
- Doors 2000
- Ruth Gilbert as Snowtext Poet 2000
- Earth's Deep Breathing 2007
- Whare Korero: Best of Reed Writings 2007
- Representative Poetry Online from 2009
- broadsheet new new zealand poetry 4 November 2009
- Voyagers Science Fiction Poems from New Zealand 2009
- Poetry Archive London Online from 2012

=== Audio and radio presentations ===
- "The Slow Years Pass" broadcast by Radio New Zealand Anzac Day 1953. Recording held in Radio New Zealand Sound Archives System ID 33323 Title: The Slow Years Pass Creator/Contributor Gilbert, Ruth Date 20 April 1953.
- "The Luthier" (sequence). A collection of audio recordings of fifty-one New Zealand poets made in 1974. Original tapes held in the Oral History collection at the Alexander Turnbull Library. The reel that includes the recording of Ruth Gilbert is reference number OHT7-0027. The tapes have been digitalised, and are available to listen to on site. CD copies are held at the University of Auckland Library in the Special Collections.

=== Letters ===
Unless indicated otherwise held in Turnball Library manuscripts (selected).

- Letters to J. H. E. Schroder
- Letters of Sylvia Ashton-Warner to Ruth Gilbert (Reproduced in Whenua, Letters to Ruth Gilbert. Cultural & Political Booklets)
- Thirty Letters from Ruth Gilbert to Niel Wright (Reproduced in Notes to More Early Poems. Cultural & Political Booklets)
- Letter in defence of Sylvia Ashton-Warner Dominion 18 September 1990
- Letters from Ruth Gilbert (Helen Shaw papers)
- Correspondence with Ruth Gilbert (James Bertram papers)
- The Lovely Acres manuscript sent to Lorna and Monte Holcroft
- Dorothy Buchanan papers
- Peter Crowe papers

== Prizes and honours ==
- Donovan Cup for unpublished poetry October 1947, Society of New Zealand Women Writers and Artists, for the poem "Lazarus"
- Jessie Mackay Memorial Award for verse

1948 for the poem sequence "Sanatorium"
1949 for Lazarus and Other Poems
1967 co-winner for The Luthier and Other Poems

- Officer of the New Zealand Order of Merit for services to poetry, 2002 Queen's Birthday and Golden Jubilee Honours

== Offices ==
- In charge Physiotherapy Department Wellington Hospital, Otaki Branch
- Society of New Zealand Women Writers and Artists President and honorary vice-president
- New Zealand P.E.N. President
- Member of the New Zealand State Literary Fund Advisory Committee

== Works about Ruth Gilbert ==
=== Reviews ===
Lazarus and Other Poems

- Listener 10 March 1950 pp. 12–13 by W. Hart-Smith
- Landfall June 1950 pp. 162–163 by D. M. Anderson

The Sunlit Hour

- Here and Now May 1956 pp. 29–30
- Landfall June 1956 pp. 151–154 by C. K. Stead
- Listener 29 March 1956 pp. 2–13
- Number 6 March 1957 anonymously but by Louis Johnson with a follow-up acknowledging authorship in August 1957.

The Luthier and Other Poems

- Listener 25 November 1966 under the heading "A Traditionalist Poet" by James Bertram
- Dominion 24 November 1966 by Louis Johnson

Collected Poems

- Listener 3 November 1984 pp. 46–47 by Lauris Edmond
- Press 6 November 1984 by Heather McPherson

Mysterious Eve

- Dominion 1 April 1989 p. 9 by Michael Mintrom

Breathings; Dream, Black Night's Child

- Nelson Evening Mail 11 December 1993 p. 14 under the heading "Gilbert captures classical spirit" by Derek Bolt
- Journal of New Zealand Literature No. 14 1996 (pub. December 1998) p. 209 "Poetry Survey" by Michael Morrissey

=== Literary Biography ===
Wright, F. W. Nielsen. Ruth Gilbert An Account of her Poetry: An Interpretative Study (1984). Cultural and Political Booklets, Wellington, 1985 ISBN 1-86933-044-7

Wright, F. W. Nielsen. Salt and Snow An Essay (1972–1988) second edition incorporating Editorial Notes to Ruth Gilbert's Early Poems 1938–1944 and to More Early Poems 1939–1944. Cultural and Political Booklets, Wellington, 1989 ISBN 1-86933-049-8

Wright, F. W. Nielsen. Theories of Style in the Schroder-Marris School of Poets in Aotearoa: An Essay in Formal Stylistics with Particular Reference to the Poets Eileen Duggan, Robin Hyde and Ruth Gilbert etc. Cultural and Political Booklets, Wellington 2001 ISBN 1-86933-481-7

Wright, F. W. Nielsen. How about Honouring the New Zealand Poet Ruth Gilbert on her 85th Birthday: A Nomination. Original Books, Wellington 2001 ISBN 1-86933-539-2

Wright, F. W. Nielsen. Celebrating Ruth Gilbert and the Triumph of Kiwi Georgianism: An Essay in the Literary History of Aoteaoa. Cultural and Political Booklets, Wellington, 2002 ISBN 1-86933-558-9

Wright, F. W. Nielsen. A. R. D. Fairburn and the Women Poets of 1948 in Aotearoa. Cultural and Political Booklets, Wellington, 2007 ISBN 1-86933-805-7

Wright, F. W. Nielsen. Noble Initiatives: Notes on Women's Writing in Aotearoa 1952–2002. Cultural and Political Booklets, Wellington, 2007 ISBN 978-1-86933-868-8

Wright, F. W. Nielsen. Sketch Profile of Ruth Gilbert with Full Commentary Quoting Various Authors: A Compilation. Cultural and Political Booklets, Wellington, 2007 ISBN 978-1-86933-873-2

Wright, F. W. Nielsen. Argybargy and the Big Dee. Cultural and Political Booklets, Wellington, 2009 ISBN 978-1-86933-965-4

=== Essays, articles, memoirs ===
- "Poet [Ruth Gilbert] wins Jessie Mackay prize", New Zealand Listener 11 November 1949 p. 9
- "Poems on Anzac Day" New Zealand Listener 18 April 1952 p. 7. Radio broadcast of ANZAC poems by Ruth Gilbert reviewed 9 May 1952 page 8
- Holcroft, Monte. The Reluctant Editor Wellington, Reed. 1969 pp. 91–92 ISBN 0-589-00305-4
- Stevens, Joan. "Gilbert, (Florence) Ruth" in Contemporary Poets of the English Language 3rd edition 1970 pp. 549–550 Dewey 821.9109
- Else, Anne. "Not more than man nor less: the treatment of women poets in Landfall, 1947–1961." Landfall 156 Dec.1985 pages 431–446
- Needham, John. "Recent Poetry and Coleridgean Principles." Journal of New Zealand Literature 3 1985 pages 35–56
- Virginia Blain, Patricia Clements and Isobel Grundy (eds). The Feminist Companion to English Literature, London, 1990 ISBN 0-7134-5848-8
- Roger Robinson and Nelson Wattie (eds). Oxford Companion to New Zealand Literature 1998 ISBN 0-19-558348-5

=== Theses ===
French, Anne. Twelve Women Poets of New Zealand: Imperatives of Shape and Growth. University of Texas, 1967.

O'Leary, Michael. Social and Literary Constraints on Women Writers in New Zealand 1945 to 1970. Victoria University of Wellington, 2011.
