= New Zealand Women Writers' Society =

Organisation for women writers (1932–1991)

- Abbreviation: NZWWS
- Formation: 11 July 1932
- Founded at: Wellington, New Zealand
- Dissolved: July 1991; 35 years ago
- Type: Incorporated society
- Purpose: Supporting women writers in New Zealand
- Headquarters: Wellington, New Zealand

The New Zealand Women Writers' Society (NZWWS), originally named the New Zealand Women Writers' and Artists' Society, was founded on 11 July 1932 in Wellington. Until its dissolution in July 1991, the NZWWS supported and encouraged women writers in New Zealand. Its activities included running writing competitions, publication of a regular newsletter, hosting events and courses, advising members on the publishing process, and publishing journals and anthologies of members' work.

== History ==
The NZWWS was founded by Nellie Donovan-Hair, then aged 18, who arranged the first meeting at the YWCA clubrooms in Wellington. She later said she "had always wanted to write, but found few outlets, and I wanted to meet other young women who had the same ambitions". The first meeting was chaired by male journalist and supporter Pat Lawlor (who would in 1977 serve as the first male vice-president of the organisation). 48 foundation members joined at or within a month of that first meeting. Donovan-Hair was appointed as secretary and treasurer, with Nellie Coad appointed as the first president. Within five months of the first meeting, the society ran its first literary competition for prose and poetry, with Senior and Junior (under 21) categories.

The NZWWS grew to 102 members in 1941, to 239 members in 1961, and to 295 members in 1979. Branches were founded in Auckland, Waikato and Hawke's Bay after the 1950s, with some informal associated groups existing in other parts of New Zealand. The NZWWS published a monthly newspaper, called The Bulletin from 1951 onwards, which included writing competitions and provided members with information about the publishing process and literary markets. The NZWWS published magazines of members' work, first in April 1934 under the title Women Writers' and Artists' Journal; a review in The Dominion newspaper commented that the work deserved wider circulation and congratulations, albeit "more for the promise they show of better things to come in the future than for any intrinsic merit they possess". It also published five issues of a journal called The Quill in the 1930s and 1940s. A review of the 1938 issue of The Quill by The New Zealand Herald called it a "decided credit to the society" which "provides some very pleasant reading".

The years of World War II were challenging for the society, with members resigning to support the war effort and a number of local magazines being closed down. The society was however able to host an evening at the New Zealand Centennial Exhibition in March 1941. In 1947 the society became incorporated, and in 1949 it became affiliated with the Society of Women Writers and Journalists in the United Kingdom. In 1954, an anthology of poems was published to mark the 21st anniversary of the society. The Evening Post commented that "disciplined technique has in several instances saved poems from mediocrity", but recommended the book for the "originality of its scope and conception".

From 1957 the NZWWS ran writing courses together with adult education providers; until the 1980s most lecturers of these courses were men. The NZWWS also made submissions to government on behalf of women writers, for example opposing copyright legislation which would disadvantage women who did not publish under their married names. In 1959 the NZWWS worked with the Bank of New Zealand to establish and organise the Katherine Mansfield Memorial Award, named for New Zealand writer Katherine Mansfield. This award continued after the society wound up in 1991, administered by a newly established committee. The NZWWS also assisted the Alexander Turnbull Library to purchase Mansfield's original manuscripts, and administered the Katherine Mansfield Menton Fellowship in its first year of establishment.

In the 1970s the NZWWS began to find itself in financial difficulties due to increases in costs. In 1976 The Bulletin was reduced to six issues per year, and it had to be supported by grants from the Todd Foundation and the Department of Internal Affairs. Monetary prizes for competition entries had to be reduced or eliminated. In the early 1980s, an anthology of members' work was published, along with a book of its history, to mark the fifty-year anniversary, and a Christchurch branch was established. At that time, the society's library contained 315 books by members, and it was noted that "many more have been published but have not been offered to our library". In 1989 the Auckland and Hawkes Bay branches went into recess, and after relaxing membership criteria failed to increase membership sufficiently, the society was disestablished in July 1991.

== Membership ==
Most of the original members of the NZWWS were young single women; later, members tended to be aged between 30 and 50, and worked as journalists, teachers, office workers or farmers. Originally members included both artists and writers, although writers soon outnumbered artists, and in 1954 (as all artist members at the time were also writers) "and Artists" was dropped from the society's name. Full membership (which included rights to vote and hold office) required published work and approval by a committee, while associate members only had to be nominated by a full member. Men were not permitted to join, despite suggestions as early as 1933 that the society should not be segregated; from 1944 they were permitted to attend meetings occasionally as visitors.

In 1960 it was estimated that 68 percent of members were based outside New Zealand's main cities, with the society and its publications enabling their connection to other women writers throughout the country.

Notable members included:

- Avis Acres (member, 1950s onwards)
- Kate Andersen (founding committee member, and president from 1935 to 1937)
- Isobel Andrews (founding committee member, and later vice-president)
- Nellie Coad (founding president, 1932–1934)
- May Cottrell (member from 1939)
- Joy Cowley (member from 1960 onwards and editor of anthology)
- Alison Drummond (member in the 1950s)
- Eileen Duggan (founding vice-president)
- Lauris Edmond (member in 1980s)
- Janet Frame (honorary vice-president from 1974)
- Ruth France (member from 1962 to 1968)
- Ivy Gibbs (founding committee member)
- Ruth Gilbert (president and honorary vice-president)
- Alice Glenday (member from 1956)
- Patricia Grace (member in the 1970s)
- Keri Hulme (honorary vice-president, 1987)
- Stella Jones (member in the 1950s)
- Elsie Locke (member from 1964 to 1969)
- Jessie Mackay (founding vice-president)
- Jane Mander (founding vice-president)
- Ngaio Marsh (honorary vice-president from 1954)
- Celia Manson (president from 1970 to 1972)
- Elsie K. Morton (founding vice-president)
- Nora Sanderson (member from 1953 to 1975)
- Nelle Scanlan (founding vice-president)
- Mary Scott (member from 1957 to 1966)
- Joan Stevens (honorary vice-president from 1961)
- Helen Wilson (founding member of the Waikato branch in 1952)
- Renée (member of the Hawke's Bay group from 1957 to 1979)

== See also ==
- List of New Zealand women writers
- New Zealand literature

== Bibliography ==
- Else, Anne (1993). Women Together, A History of Women's Organisations in New Zealand. Wellington: Daphne Brasell Associates Press. ISBN 978-0-9088-9629-5.
- France, Thelma; Quinn, Hestia; Henden, Roma; Ashforth, Isobelle, eds. (1984). History of the New Zealand Women Writers' Society, 1932–1982. Wellington: The New Zealand Women Writers' Society. ISBN 0-9597705-0-X.
- Hayward, Margaret; Cowley, Joy, eds. (1982). Women Writers of NZ 1932–1982, Jubilee History and Writings of the New Zealand Women Writers' Society. Wellington: Colonial Associates. ISBN 0-9597585-4-2.
