= Marjory Nicholls =

New Zealand drama producer, teacher and poet

Marjory Lydia Nicholls (29 July 1890 – 1 October 1930) was a New Zealand poet, teacher and drama producer. She was a significant figure in New Zealand poetry and theatre between 1910 and 1930, and became a well-known personality in Wellington, with interests in theatre, writing and the arts.

== Early life and education ==
Nicholls was born in Wellington in 1890. She was the youngest daughter of Harry Edgar Nicholls, a Harbour Board Secretary and a prominent actor in the Wellington theatre scene.

She was educated first at Clyde Quay School and Terrace School and after at Wellington Girls' College and Victoria University College. She entered Victoria in 1909, where she studied Greek, Latin and French and became involved with the Edwardian Spike group of writers (1902–15), that included Siegfried Eichelbaum, Seaforth Mackenzie, A. F. T. Chorlton, Hubert Church, Philip Grey, Mary E. Heath (later Mrs Ballantyne), Erica R. Fell (later Mrs Erica R. Wilson), A. E. Caddick and F. A. de la Mare.

At Victoria, her interests included The Play Readers' Society in Kelburn and the Women's Debating Society and she edited the student review, The Spike, in 1912. She was Vice-President of the Students' Association in 1912 and 1913. Her father instructed the play readers' group. She also produced two plays for the University Dramatic Society when first it began. An accomplished orator, in 1913, she became the first woman to compete for and win the Plunket Medal for Oratory at Victoria College.

== Career ==
Nicholls left Victoria and travelled abroad to London in 1914, making contacts with the English and European stage. She moved back and forth between her activities at Victoria and further travel overseas visiting a number of countries, including Australia, South Africa, France and India, before returning to Wellington around 1919. In India and Ceylon, she met her future husband.

In February 1920, Nicholls married John Hannah, a merchant of Colombo. She moved from Wellington to Ceylon (now Sri Lanka) for the wedding. On the death of her husband from enteric fever soon after the wedding, Nicholls returned to Wellington, where her family lived and where she became a well-known personality in the arts scene. She became involved with acting and producing in the repertory theatre, continued to write poetry and did painting. She had earlier studied painting with Miss D. K. Richmond.

She also made trips to England, France, North America and India. In England, in 1925, she became a member of the British Drama League and attended summer schools at Oxford and Sussex where drama and poetry were the subject of study. She also studied theatre at the Pasadena Theatre in California and the Greenleaf Theatre in New York.

Nicholls produced plays by A. A. Milne, Sir A. P. Herbert, Lady Gregory and other modern playwrights for the National Repertory Society in Wellington and the Victoria University College Dramatic Society.

In addition, she worked as a university extension lecturer in drama for the Workers' Educational Association, taught at Wellington Girls' College and Chilton St James School and in teaching elocution. In 1928, Nicholls also gave a lecture on 'The Literature of New Zealand' in the Dominion Farmers' Institute building for the WEA.

Her other interests included the Society for Prevention of Cruelty to Animals, and she was a member of the League of Nations local branch, and also of the International Council of Women. Nicholls was instrumental in reforming the council in New Zealand, and attended meetings of the executive of the council in London in 1929.

== Death ==
Nicholls died in a bus stop accident on 1 October 1930 returning from a concert. An obituary appeared a day after in the Evening Post. It was reported that she was knocked over by a bus turning around in the darkened street that reversed, ran over and crushed her. She was 40 years old at the time of her death. The Post obituary wrote: ‘Her death removes a cultured and charming personality who could ill be spared.’ A large attendance at her funeral on 4 October 1930 indicated the esteem and high regard with which Wellingtonians held her. Further obituaries appeared in Art in New Zealand (March 1931) and in The Spike 1931 by Eileen Duggan.

In her will, Nicholls made a bequest of moneys to buy artworks for display in the woman's common room at Victoria College. Her executors commissioned a portrait painting by Mollie Tripe of Marjory. Beryl Hughes notes that the painting hung in the Women's Studies Department at Victoria University of Wellington but is now in storage. A Marjory Nicholls Speech Contest was also established after her death at Wellington Girls’ College.

== Literary output ==
Nicholls wrote verse from a young school age and published three collections of poetry in her lifetime: A Venture in Verse (1917), Gathered Leaves (1922) and prior to her death, Thirdly (1930).

Her poetry is mostly collected in the Victoria University College anthology The Old Clay Patch (1920 and 1949 editions) and The Spike, the Victoria College student review. She also published poems in C. C. Review [Canterbury College Review] and The Reporter and was included in Quentin Pope's 1930 anthology of contemporary New Zealand verse, Kowhai Gold.

There is a posthumously published poem in the literary magazine The New Zealand Mercury (Vol. 1, No. 1, 1933) contributed by her father, H. E. Nicholls, and another poem, 'She Clothed Herself in Dreams', appears in The Evening Post (14 March 1936) reproduced by C. A. Marris on popular request for his "Postscripts" column edited under the pseudonym of Percy Flage. The editor's note in The New Zealand Mercury states that Nicholls' ‘literary achievement is held in high honour in this Dominion.’

Two poems by Nicholls appear in the 1937 anthology, Here are Verses, edited by Helen Longford. Some of her verse was also published under her married name of Mrs Marjory L. Hannah or the initials 'M.L.N.'.

Nicholls' poem 'Over the Kelburn Hill' was republished in Pat Lawlor's Wellington in Verse and Picture (c.1939, 2nd edition 1955).

In 1940, G. H. Scholefield wrote an article on Nicholls for the Dictionary of New Zealand Biography.

In 2009, Original Books published Complete Poems in two volumes.

== Renewal of interest ==
In the past two decades, there has been renewed interest in Nicholls' verse and life.

Beryl Hughes wrote on Nicholls for the Book of New Zealand Women (1991) and the Dictionary of New Zealand Biography, Vol. III (1996).

In 2009, New Zealand scholar, poet and publisher Niel Wright edited her Complete Poems (under the authorial name of M. L. Nicholls) in two volumes, with notes published separately that same year.

This can be seen as a reappraisal of her place in New Zealand poetry during the Georgian and post-war period (1915–1930) and a sign of her status as an early feminist writer. Wright also states in her Complete Poems that 'Nicholls was a leading New Zealand poet of the decade 1910–1920'. She was encouraged by a young J. H. E. Schröder in C. C. Review who later influenced among others Robin Hyde, Ruth Gilbert and Wright himself.

Wright later produced a book discussing Schröder and Nicholls' friendship, 'J.H.E. Schroder and the Poetry of E.S. and Marjory Nicholls' in C.C. Review (2010) as well as Further Notes on the Aotearoa Poet Marjory Lydia Nicholls (2011).

In 2011, New Zealand poet, critic and editor Mark Pirie wrote on Nicholls' verse on the Tuesday Poem blog and included her poetry in Poetry Notes, the Poetry Archive of New Zealand Aotearoa newsletter, Summer 2011. That same year, a selection of her poems was made by Cameron La Follette for the University of Toronto Libraries' RPO [Representative Poetry Online] website.

Michael John O'Leary's PhD thesis, 'Social and Literary Constraints on Women Writers in New Zealand 1945–70', awarded in 2011 by the Gender and Women's Studies Department at Victoria University of Wellington also discusses the work of Nicholls.
