= Peter Jacobson (disambiguation) =

Peter Jacobson (born 1965) is an actor.

Peter Jacobson may also refer to:

- Peter Marc Jacobson (born 1957), American television writer, director and producer
- Peter Jacobson (judge), Federal Court of Australia judge
- Peter Jacobson (poet) (1925–1998), New Zealand poet
- Pete Jacobson of The Even Dozen Jug Band

== See also ==
- Johan Peter Jacobson (1857–?), Norwegian politician
- Peter Jacobsen (born 1954), American golfer and commentator
