= Michael O'Leary =

Michael O'Leary may refer to:

- Michael John O'Leary (1890–1961), Irish-Canadian recipient of the Victoria Cross
- Michael O'Leary (politician) (1936–2006), Irish politician and leader of the Irish Labour Party, 1981–82
- Michael O'Leary (writer) (born 1950), New Zealand publisher, poet and novelist
- Michael O'Leary (actor) (born 1958), actor in the long-running American soap opera Guiding Light
- Michael O'Leary (businessman) (born 1961), CEO of low-cost Irish airline Ryanair
- Michael O'Leary (pioneer) (1858-1930), Australian pioneer
- Michael O'Leary, a character played by Humphrey Bogart in the 1939 film Dark Victory
