= Katherine Mansfield Memorial Award =

New Zealand literary award (1959–2015)

- Awarded for: Short stories
- Sponsored by: Bank of New Zealand
- Country: New Zealand
- Reward: $10,000 for premier award
- First award: 1959
- Final award: 2014
- Website: www.bnzheritage.co.nz/archives/story/katherine-mansfield-awards

The Katherine Mansfield Memorial Award was a competition for short stories in New Zealand that ran every two years from 1959 to 2003, and every year from 2004 to 2014. The competition had multiple categories, including an essay section until 1963, a supreme award for short stories, and awards for novice and young writers. It was sponsored by the Bank of New Zealand and in 2010 was renamed the BNZ Literary Awards. Since the competition's disestablishment in 2015 the Katherine Mansfield Birthplace Society has presented the annual Mansfield Short Story Award to high-school students in Wellington.

== History ==
The award was established by the New Zealand Women Writers' Society in 1959, with funding from the Bank of New Zealand. It was established in order to recognise the contributions of Katherine Mansfield to New Zealand literature. Mansfield's father Harold Beauchamp had been a member of the board of directors of the bank from 1898 to 1935. The prizes for the first award were 50 guineas for the best short story and 50 guineas for the best essay.

The first award, judged by Joan Stevens, was shared by Maurice Duggan (short story) and Elsie Locke (essay). Special awards of 15 guineas each were also presented to the runners-up, O. E. Middleton for a short story and Arapera Blank for an article respectively. In 1961, on the second occasion of the award, C.K. Stead won both the short story and essay categories.

In 1963, the essay section was removed and in 1967 a new category was added, of the Young Writers Award for writers under the age of 25. Changes were also made to provide that work would only be eligible for the award if it had not previously been published. At the awards ceremony in 1963, New Zealand's Governor-General Bernard Fergusson caused some controversy by commenting that it was "shocking" that "123 years after the Treaty of Waitangi there is not one Maori in the room". He called it a "sad comment" on the literary circles represented by the audience. His comments were sparked by an earlier speech by the competition's judge which had noted the number of stories concerning conflict between Māori and Pākehā (New Zealand Europeans).

In 1969, Alice Glenday was the first woman to win the short story award. In 1971 word count restrictions were introduced, and in 1981 a second-place award was introduced as well as an award for novice writers of any age (with the Young Writers Award now being for secondary school students). In 1993 a non-fiction essay award was introduced to mark the centenary of women's suffrage in New Zealand.

In 1999, a collection of all 20 stories that had received the main award over the previous 40 years was published, titled "Oh, to be a Writer, a Real Writer!": Winners of the Katherine Mansfield Short Story Award, 1959–1999, and edited by Jane Tolerton and Joy Tonks. An introduction was written by Vincent O'Sullivan, himself a former recipient of the award.

In 2001, competition entrants were able to submit their entries online for the first time. At that time there were four categories: the Katherine Mansfield Award ($5,000), the Novice Writers Award ($1,500), the Young Writers Award ($1,000), and the Essay Award ($1,000). In 2004 the prize money for the top award was doubled to $10,000, and the Young Writers Award recipients received $1,500 as well as $1,500 for their school. From 2005 onwards the awards took place annually rather than once every two years.

In 2010, the competition was renamed the BNZ Literary Awards. In 2011, a new $500 award was introduced for a "Short Short Story", of no more than 150 words submitted via Facebook; and in 2014, a new $1,000 award was introduced for a short story submitted via Twitter in a single tweet. The awards were disestablished in 2015. Since 2016 the Katherine Mansfield Birthplace Society has presented the annual Mansfield Short Story Award for year 12 and 13 high school students in Wellington.

== Notable winners ==
Notable winners include:

- Maurice Duggan (1959, short story section)
- Elsie Locke (1959, essay section)
- C.K. Stead (1961, both sections)
- Maurice Shadbolt (1963, 1967 and 1995)
- Frank Sargeson (1965)
- Alice Glenday (1969)
- Rowan Metcalfe (young writers' award, 1974, and main award, 1997)
- Keri Hulme (1975)
- Vincent O'Sullivan (1979)
- Daphne de Jong (1981)
- Alistair Paterson (1993)
- Kate de Goldi (1999)
- Tracey Slaughter (novice section, 2001, and main award, 2004)
- Charlotte Grimshaw (2006)
- Carl Nixon (2007)
- Craig Cliff (novice section, 2007)
- Catherine Chidgey (2013)

== See also ==
- Katherine Mansfield Menton Fellowship (a fellowship offered to New Zealand writers, also named for Mansfield)
- List of New Zealand literary awards

== Bibliography ==
- Tolerton, Jane; Tonks, Joy, eds. (1999). "Oh, to be a Writer, a Real Writer!": Winners of the Katherine Mansfield Short Story Award, 1959–1999. Wellington: Victoria University Press. ISBN 9780864733733.
