= New Zealand Organisation for Quality =

- New Zealand Organisation for Quality Incorporated (NZOQ)
- The logo and trademark of NZOQ
- Abbreviation: NZOQ
- Established: 31 January 1978; 48 years ago
- Founded at: Massey University, Palmerston North, New Zealand
- Type: Incorporated society
- Registration no.: 224495
- Legal status: Registered
- Headquarters: Palmerston North, New Zealand
- Location: New Zealand
- Coordinates: 40.35482°S 175.61058°E
- Services: Membership; training; certification
- Fields: Quality management; Business excellence
- President: Abraham Fenn (2016–present)
- Main organ: Board of directors
- Subsidiaries: New Zealand Business Excellence Foundation
- Affiliations: Asia Pacific Quality Organization
- Website: www.nzoq.org.nz
- Formerly called: New Zealand Organisation for Quality Assurance (1978–1992)

The New Zealand Organisation for Quality (NZOQ), originally the New Zealand Organisation for Quality Assurance (NZOQA), is a non-partisan incorporated society dedicated to improving the quality of goods and services in New Zealand and providing leadership in the adoption of the principles of quality management and best practice.

NZOQ was incorporated on 31 January 1978. The organisation is based in Palmerston North, with an additional support office in Auckland.

== Mission ==
The mission of the organisation is to "promote and support the maximisation of capability in world-class business processes and performance for businesses and individuals [within New Zealand]" through advocacy, education, promotion, and support.

== History ==
=== Formation ===
In 1976, a conference was organised in Palmerston North by the Department of Industrial Management and Engineering of Massey University and a meeting was convened to discuss the idea of a national organisation for quality assurance in New Zealand. As a consequence, a steering committee was set up with the aim of investigating the need for a professional body and what form it might take. In May 1977, the committee reported back that there was a need for a professional body for quality assurance in line with the American Society for Quality Control.

Delegates at the Massey University conference at which NZOQA was formed, May 1977

The constitution of the New Zealand Organisation for Quality Assurance was registered in January 1978. It included the mission of the organisation and stated in part that there would be an annual conference and a quarterly journal. A requirement was to provide training to members and to allow a 'local' flavour to be incorporated into the organisational structure via regional committees. The national committee was to consist of representatives of the various regional committees with a rotating President every two years.

The first two years were spent setting up the national organisation, internal structures, and running small-scale workshops. Meanwhile, the membership grew from 21 individuals and 23 company members in July 1977 to over 500 members representing over 140 companies by May 1978.

=== Development ===
During the late 1970s, while quality education was being carried out by NZOQA on a regional basis, the Certificate of Quality Assurance was developed to cover different aspects of quality assurance as a more structured approach to quality education.

In 1978, an initiative with the New Zealand Institute of Food Science and Technology (NZIFST) led to the development of the Diploma in Food Quality Assurance at Massey University, and later the Diploma in Quality Assurance.

NZOQA promoted quality assurance and the principles and practices of total quality management (TQM) to New Zealand businesses throughout the 1980s. New Zealand organisations at the time opted for ISO 9000 in preference to TQM, as ISO offered them international recognition and TQM was perceived to be too different from conventional management.

NZOQA began to move away from its close association with Massey University when it held its first stand-alone conference in 1980. The organisation changed its name to the New Zealand Organisation for Quality in 1992, at which time it had more than 1000 members.

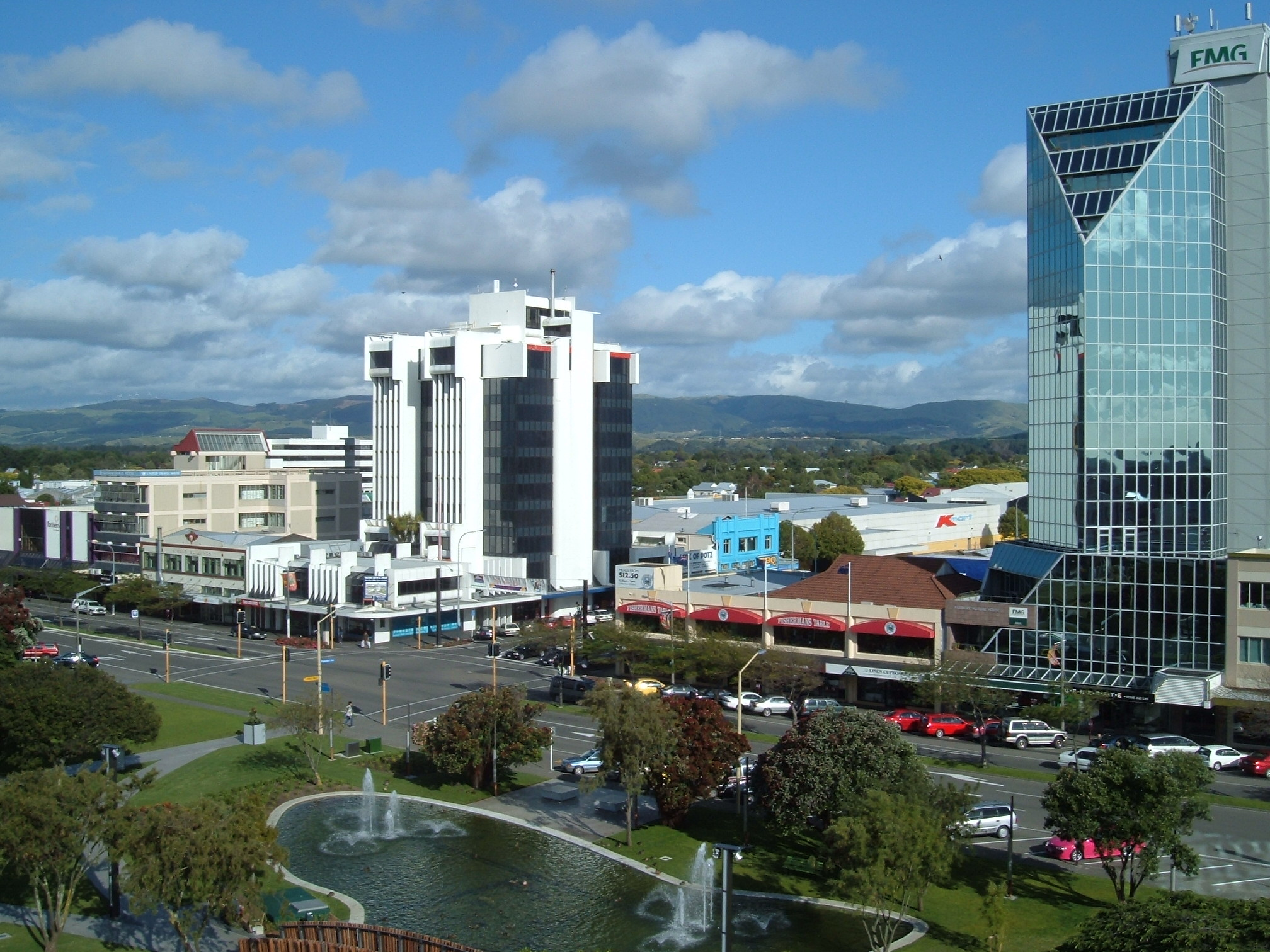
The National Office of NZOQ is located on The Square, in the centre of Palmerston North

=== Expansion ===
In 2016, NZOQ and the New Zealand Business Excellence Foundation (which was established in 1992 as the New Zealand Quality Foundation) merged operations to allow for a broader range of expertise and capabilities in providing leadership in the practices of quality management and performance excellence in New Zealand.

== Programmes and services ==
NZOQ has divisions that cater for members in particular areas of New Zealand, including four permanent branches based in Auckland (Northern Branch), Palmerston North (Central Branch), Christchurch (Canterbury Branch), and Dunedin (Otago–Southland Branch).

Training and educational programmes that have been established by NZOQ are often run in conjunction with other local educational institutions, such as the Open Polytechnic of New Zealand. NZOQ also endorses tertiary qualifications such as the Master of Quality Systems offered by Massey University.

NZOQ administers several quality prizes in New Zealand, including the NZOQ–Lysaght Conference Scholarship, which are open to persons or groups of persons who are members of NZOQ or who work for member companies.

== Affiliations ==
NZOQ is a Sustaining Council member country of the Asia Pacific Quality Organization.
