= Auckland Youth Symphonic Band =

Auckland Youth Symphonic Band Incorporated
- Origin: Auckland, New Zealand
- Genres: Concert Band/Wind Band
- Years active: 1967–present
- Website: http://awo.co.nz/ http://www.aysb.altervista.org/

The Auckland Youth Symphonic Band Incorporated (AYSB (Inc)) is an incorporated society that runs both the Auckland Youth Symphonic Band (AYSB) and the Auckland Wind Orchestra (AWO), both based in Auckland, New Zealand.

== About ==
The AYSB and AWO are both community concert bands based in Auckland, New Zealand. The AYSB primarily consists of members from year 7 (age 12) to university age, while members of the AWO are typically of university age to adults. Instruments in both groups include: piccolo, flute, oboe, clarinet (including bass clarinet), bassoon, saxophone, French horn, trumpet, trombone, euphonium, tuba, orchestral percussion and drum kit.

== Repertoire and Performances ==
Both bands play a variety of music, including classical transcriptions, folk tunes, film music, musicals, dance accompaniments and dances, and original compositions. There is a focus, however, on dedicated Concert Band repertoire. This has changed somewhat from the band's early days of primarily light music and marches.

Both bands typically play in concerts in Auckland as standalone performances, however do often combine. Occasionally, they have performed as a part of a larger event.

== History ==
The Auckland Youth Symphonic Band was established in 1967 by Hugh Dixon, as an opportunity for amateur woodwind and brass musicians to perform in a group after dissatisfaction with orchestral parts.

In 1970, the Band was renamed from the Auckland Junior Symphonic Band (AJSB) to the Auckland Youth Symphonic Band (AYSB) and in 1971, became an Incorporated society.

The Junior Division was formed in 1973 after the number of players reached 86. This was called the Junior Division (as opposed to the Senior Division) of the AYSB. In 1974, an ensemble consisting of flute and clarinet players was formed, under the direction of Tony Webster. This was disbanded in 1975.

In 1980 the Senior Division toured Singapore, and in 1986 the Junior Division toured Fiji. In 1988, the Junior Division played in Brisbane, for the 1988 World Expo. In 1998, the AYSB travelled to Australia to perform in the 21st Manly International Jazz Festival.

In 1999, the Senior Division of the AYSB was renamed to the Auckland Wind Orchestra.

== Conductors ==
=== Auckland Wind Orchestra ===
- 1967–1977 Hugh Dixon
- 1977–1989? Don Carpenter
- 1989–1994 David Adlam
- 1994–1999 Jim Allen
- 1998–2003 Peter Thomas
- 2001–2008 Adrian Raven, Peter Thomas, Andrew Marshall, John Rimmer, Opeloge Ah Sam, Ashley Hopkins
- 2008–2009 Ewan Clark
- 2009–2010 Ryan Youens
- 2011–2015 Hamish Arthur
- 2016–2021 Oliver Gilmour
- 2021-present Alex Eichelbaum

=== Auckland Youth Symphonic Band ===
- 1973–1975 Martin Heath
- 1975–1977 David Adlam
- 1977 Robert Savigny
- 1977–2018 Rod McLeay
- 2018–present Michael Jamieson

=== Flute and Clarinet Ensemble ===
- 1974–1975 Tony Webster
