= Glenday =

Glenday is a surname. Notable people with the surname include:

- Alice Glenday (1920–2004), New Zealand novelist
- John Glenday (born 1952), Scottish poet
- Vincent Glenday (1891–1970), British colonial administrator
