= Strange Meeting =

Strange Meeting may refer to:

- Strange Meeting (novel), by Susan Hill
- "Strange Meeting" (poem), by Wilfred Owen

== See also ==
- Strange Meetings, a non-fiction book by Harry Ricketts
