= Dominic Hibberd =

Dominic Hibberd FRSL
- Born: John William Dominic Hibberd; November 3, 1941; Guildford, England
- Died: August 12, 2012 (aged 70); Oxfordshire, England
- Education: Rugby School, King's College, Cambridge
- Occupations: Author; academic; broadcaster
- Writing career
- Language: English
- Genres: Biography; poetry criticism; literary studies

John William Dominic Hibberd FRSL (3 November 1941 – 12 August 2012) was an English freelance author, academic and broadcaster, best known for his biographies of the poets Wilfred Owen and Harold Monro and his collections (edited with John Onions) of First World War poetry. He was an Honorary Fellow of the War Poets Association and contributed numerous articles to the Oxford Dictionary of National Biography.

Born and brought up in Guildford, he was educated at Rugby School and King's College, Cambridge. He went on to teach at Manchester Grammar School and at universities in Britain, the United States and China, before moving to Oxford and devoting himself full-time to writing. In April 2011 he was awarded a higher doctorate (Litt D) by Cambridge University in recognition of his work.

Hibberd died in the early hours of 12 August 2012 at his Oxfordshire home. His death came from pneumonia complicating Corticobasal Degeneration, a rare neurological disorder which was only subsequently diagnosed at post mortem. He was 70.

== Works ==
- Wilfred Owen: War Poems and Others edited by Dominic Hibberd (London: Chatto & Windus, 1973)
- Poetry of the First World War edited by Dominic Hibberd (London: Macmillan, 1981) ISBN 0333261208
- Owen The Poet by Dominic Hibberd (University of Georgia Press, 1986) ISBN 0820308587
- Poetry of the Great War: An Anthology edited by Dominic Hibberd and John Onions (London: Macmillan, 1986) ISBN 031261926X
- The First World War: Context and Commentary by Dominic Hibberd (London: Macmillan, 1990) ISBN 0333397762
- Diary of a Dead Officer: Being the Posthumous Papers of Arthur Graeme West with new introduction by Dominic Hibberd (London: Imperial War Museum, 1991) Reissued in 2007 by MBI Pub. ISBN 9781853677298
- Wilfred Owen: The Last Year 1917-1918 by Dominic Hibberd (London: Constable, 1992) ISBN 0094708207
- Harold Monro: Poet of the New Age by Dominic Hibberd (Basingstoke and New York: Palgrave, 2001) ISBN 0312224214
- Wilfred Owen: A New Biography by Dominic Hibberd (London: Weidenfeld & Nicolson, 2002) ISBN 0297829459
- Strange Meetings: Poems by Harold Monro edited by Dominic Hibberd (Holt: Laurel Books, 2003)
- The Winter of the World: Poems of the First World War edited by Dominic Hibberd and John Onions (London: Constable & Robinson, 2007) ISBN 9781845295158
- Chapter 7 in The Oxford Critical and Cultural History of Modernist Magazines, Volume 1 (Oxford: OUP, 2009)
- Articles and reviews for many literary and academic publications, including The Cambridge Review, The Review of English Studies, and The Times Literary Supplement. He contributed to the Oxford Dictionary of National Biography articles on the Georgian Poets, Frederic Manning, Harold Monro, HH Munro (Saki) and Arthur Graeme West.
