= Alison Drummond =

New Zealand writer (1903–1984)

- Born: Alison Edith Hilda Craig; 22 January 1903; Coromandel Peninsula, New Zealand
- Died: 3 July 1984 (aged 81); Manurewa, New Zealand
- Occupations: Writer; farmer
- Known for: Historical works about New Zealand's early settlers
- Spouse: Leo Drummond (m. 1935; died 1967)
- Children: 2
- Writing career
- Notable works: Married and Gone to New Zealand (1960)

Alison Edith Hilda Drummond (née Craig; 22 January 1903 – 3 July 1984) was a New Zealand non-fiction writer, historian, editor and poet. Born in the Coromandel Peninsula, Drummond trained as a Karitane nurse before moving to Gordonton in the Waikato region where she and her husband ran a farm. She received awards for her poems, plays and articles, published three historical books about colonial life in New Zealand, and edited the journals of Vicesimus Lush.

== Early life ==
Drummond was born in Waitekauri, Coromandel Peninsula, New Zealand, on 22 January 1903. She was a grandniece of scholar Elsdon Best and minister William Bannerman, and the granddaughter of judge Walter Edward Gudgeon. Her family moved to Auckland in 1914, where Alison attended the Diocesan School for Girls and trained as a Karitane nurse. On 30 November 1935 she married farmer Leo Roderick Drummond; they farmed at Gordonton in the Waikato region and had two children together.

== Writing career ==
Drummond wrote poems, plays and short stories, and was a member of the New Zealand Women Writers' Society from 1950. She won awards in play competitions run by the British Drama League in 1949, 1951, 1952 and 1954. In 1954 her poem "Peace" won a national poetry competition for three-verse poetry; the poem was subsequently set to music following a separate competition. In the same year she received third prize for best newspaper leading article in an international competition run by the British Society of Women Writers and Journalists.

Drummond's first book, Married and Gone to New Zealand, was published in 1960 by Paul's Book Arcade and Oxford University Press. It was an account of early settler life in New Zealand in the 1840s and 1850s, with extracts from the writings of female settlers. It included sketches by Drummond's husband and he assisted her in researching and gathering information. A review in The Press concluded that "the pleasure that Mrs Drummond has found in steeping herself in the writings of these women of early New Zealand is now, thanks to her industry, one that the reader may likewise enjoy".

Her second book, Early Days in the Waikato, was published in 1964 by Paul's Book Arcade, as part of marking 100 years of European settlement in the Waikato region. It was followed in 1967 by her third book At Home in New Zealand, written together with her husband and published by Blackwood and Janet Paul. The work included written accounts from early settlers, including the letters of Mary Hobhouse, wife of the first Bishop of Nelson. The Press called it an "attractively produced" book. In the same year she published "Children of the Country" in the New Zealand School Journal.

In 1967 the Drummonds retired from the farm and moved to Kawakawa Bay in Auckland. Her husband passed away later that year. From 1971 to 1982, Drummond edited and published the journals of Vicesimus Lush, a 19th-century Waikato archdeacon, in three volumes. She died at Manurewa on 3 July 1984.

== Selected works ==
=== Historical non-fiction ===
- Married and Gone to New Zealand (Paul's Book Arcade, 1960; Oxford University Press, 1960)
- Early Days in the Waikato (Paul's Book Arcade, 1964)
- At Home in New Zealand: an illustrated history of everyday things before 1865, with L.R. Drummond (Blackwood and Janet Paul, 1967)

=== As editor ===
- The Auckland Journals of Vicesimus Lush. 1850–1863 (Pegasus Press, 1971)
- The Thames Journals of Vicesimus Lush. 1868–82 (Pegasus Press, 1977)
- The Waikato Journals of Vicesimus Lush. 1864–8; 1881–2 (Pegasus Press, 1982)
