= Joyce West =

New Zealand writer

Joyce Tarlton West (1 July 1908–21 February 1985) was a New Zealand novelist and children's writer. Born in Auckland, she spent her childhood in remote country districts where her parents taught in Māori schools. Of herself she wrote: “We lived far from towns, in a world of bush roads and river crossings; we rode horseback everywhere, and kept a large menagerie of dogs, cats, kittens, ducks, turkeys, pet lambs, and goats. . . . When I began to write, it was with the wish that I might save a little of the charm and flavour of those times and places for the children of today.”

Joyce West began publishing stories and articles as a teenager. Her first novel was a pioneer family saga, Sheep Kings, set beyond Gisborne. She is best known for her novel Drovers Road, a tale of family life on a New Zealand sheep station first published in London in 1953. She published two sequels to Drovers Road: The Golden Country and Cape Lost, which have been reprinted as the Drovers Road Collection. The novels follow the heroine, Gay Allan, from primary school through to her marriage. The first two books are set on her uncle's farm where she lives after her own parents have separated, and The Golden Country takes place on her own farm, which she inherits from a great uncle. Apart from the main theme, of growing up and choosing a career and a partner, the books are episodic, showing the very real events which can happen when there are sheep to be mustered and shorn, when lambing takes place in floods, and when there are swollen rivers and landslides to be negotiated. If sheep provide the money, horses provide the fun, and equestrian events such as hunts, shows, and races are the background to much of the social life described in these books.

The Sea Islanders presents a modern variant of the Robinson Crusoe theme. A family of children choose to go to Penguin Island when their father is away in Antarctica and an aunt with whom they should have been staying has to go to hospital. They spend what money they have on food and discover their old bach, where they had previously stayed on holidays, was still reasonably well equipped. Local Maori see that they lack for nothing, and they are able to collect a variety of animals as pets. Apart from the problems that any children might experience on their own, such as not knowing how to manage the solid-fuel stove or how to cook, their lives are never in the balance until they are nearly drowned by the rising tide as they cling to rocks to escape a grass fire.

West has been described as the most distinguished author of rural fiction of her time, "delineating children growing to maturity with the warm acceptance of their families and communities". She illustrated several of her books with her own ink drawings. Her works include five thrillers written with New Zealand novelist and teacher Mary Scott. She also contributed poetry and articles to the New Zealand Railways Magazine.

Her novel The Sea Islanders was turned into a five-part British TV series Jackanory (1971).

== Selected works ==
- Sheep Kings. Wellington, NZ: Harry H. Tombs Ltd., 1936.
- Drovers Road. London: J.M. Dent, 1953.
- Year of the Shining Cuckoo. Hamilton NZ: Paul's Book Arcade, 1961.
- Cape Lost. Auckland, NZ: Paul's Book Arcade. London: J.M. Dent, 1963.
- The Golden Country. London: J.M. Dent. Hamilton NZ: Blackwood & Janet Paul, 1965.
- Sea Islanders. London: J.M. Dent, 1970.
- River Road. London: J.M. Dent, 1980.

With Mary Scott (1888–1979)

- Fatal Lady. Hamilton NZ: Paul's Book Arcade, 1960.
- Such Nice People. Hamilton NZ: Paul's Book Arcade. Sydney: Angus and Robertson, 1962.
- Mangrove Murder. Auckland NZ: Paul's Book Arcade. London: Angus and Robertson, 1963.
- No Red Herrings. Auckland, NZ: Paul's Book Arcade. London: Angus and Robertson, 1964.
- Who Put it There? Hamilton NZ: Blackwood & Janet Paul, 1965.
