= Andreas Thidemand Carlsen Ruud =

Norwegian politician

Andreas Thidemand Carlsen Ruud (28 July 1857 - ??) was a Norwegian politician for the Conservative Party.

He served as a deputy representative to the Norwegian Parliament during the terms 1900–1903 and 1904–1906, representing the constituency of Drammen.

Born in Sande, he worked in Drammen as a molder. He was a member of Drammen city council from 1901 to 1907.
