= Mary Scott (novelist) =

New Zealand novelist

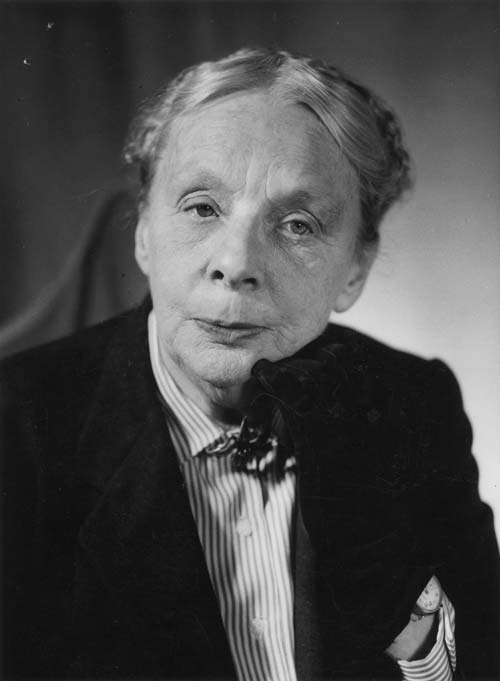
- Scott, c. 1959
- Born: Mary Edith Clarke; 23 September 1888; Waimate North, New Zealand
- Died: 16 July 1979 (aged 90); Tokoroa, New Zealand
- Resting place: Alexandra Cemetery, Pirongia
- Education: MA, Auckland University College
- Occupations: Novelist; teacher; librarian
- Spouse: Walter Scott (m. 1914; died 1960)
- Children: 4
- Writing career
- Pen name: Marten Stuart
- Period: 1935–1979
- Genre: Romantic comedy

Mary Edith Scott (née Clarke; 23 September 1888 – 16 July 1979) was a New Zealand novelist, teacher and librarian. She was a prolific writer who specialised in romantic comedies set in rural New Zealand, and her books were widely read both in New Zealand and overseas. From 1953 to 1978 she wrote at a rate of at least one book per year. She published over thirty novels, five detective novels written jointly with Joyce West, an autobiography, and three collections of plays.

== Early life and education ==
Scott was born in Waimate North, Northland, New Zealand in 1888. She was the daughter of Marsden Clarke, a grazier, and his wife Frances Emily Stuart. She was a great-granddaughter of George Clarke, an early New Zealand missionary.

After Scott's father died in 1889, her mother took her and her older siblings to Napier, New Zealand to live with their maternal grandfather, Edward Stuart, the second Bishop of Waiapu. She attended Napier Girls' High School for two years, after which the family moved to Auckland and she attended Auckland Girls' Grammar School. In 1905 she went to Auckland University College to study English, French and history. After a period of teaching at Gisborne High School, she completed a Masters of Arts with first-class honours, graduating in 1910. After graduating she continued her teaching career. In around 1912 she climbed the mountain range of The Remarkables with her brother and was possibly the first woman to do so.

== Marriage and farm ==
In October 1914 she married Walter Scott, her sister's husband's brother, and they moved to a sheep farm on the slopes of Mount Pirongia in the King Country. They had four children together. The farming life was a difficult one and the family struggled with most of their cattle dying of bush sickness, and much of their property being destroyed by two fires in 1917 and 1918. Years later she was to tell the story of their struggle to develop the property and raise a family in her autobiography, Days That Have Been (1966), and would also use these experiences as the basis for her novel The Unwritten Book (1957). In 1927 the family moved to a new farm at Ngutunui, near Te Awamutu, and Scott took a job as a librarian in town.

== Literary career ==
Scott began writing in the late 1920s, in order to supplement the family's income. She wrote humorous sketches, based on her own life on the farm and starring the character "Barbara", a farmer's wife, for the Dunedin Evening Star, The New Zealand Herald and other newspapers on a weekly basis. In 1930 the New Zealand Artists' Annual recognised her as its "Annual Discovery". She continued writing for newspapers in both New Zealand and the UK for the next fifty years, at times as many as fourteen articles a month. Scott's first two novels, Where the Apple Reddens and And Shadows Flee were published under a pseudonym, Marten Stuart, in the mid-1930s. Unlike her later novels, they were historical romances set in early nineteenth century New Zealand, and she was later to say that they were "better buried in oblivion".

Her newspaper "Barbara" stories proved so popular that they were published in five collections over the next twenty years, beginning with Barbara and the New Zealand Back-blocks (1936), and recorded for radio broadcast. The first collection was published by Thomas Avery & Sons, New Plymouth and they were thereafter published by A.H. and A.W. Reed. They were set on the New Zealand "backblocks", a term used in Australia and New Zealand to describe remote rural farmland. In a review of Barbara Prospers, the Otago Daily Times said that her Barbara books were "a series of lively, intimate pictures, by turn uplifting or depressing, but never pessimistic or cheerless, of the everyday happenings of backblocks life". The Manawatu Times said the first collection was "a gem which should be on the shelves of all collectors of New Zealand books", and warned readers that "the whole edition is likely to be sold out by Christmas".

Scott's novels were mainly light and contemporary romantic comedies set in the King Country, published both in London and New Zealand. They were described by Joan Stevens as "certainly readable; they follow an easily foreseen pattern, evoke the expected reactions, and provide comedy without ever stretching the faculties too far". Stevens highlighted One of the Family (1958) as one of the most successful of the novels, about an English uncle visiting New Zealand. They did, however, have an undercurrent of seriousness, due to Scott's family's experiences in the Great Depression; many of her stories featured themes of debt and poverty, or the failure of being forced to leave the backblocks and return to living in town. She also published three volumes of plays, and in the 1960s collaborated with fellow New Zealand writer Joyce West on five detective novels starring the character Inspector Wright.

In 1940 Scott was asked how she managed to find time to run a farm, a family and a home as well as write. In response, she said that her husband would be annoyed if she said she ran the farm, that nobody could be said to "run" a family, and that her home ran itself.

Scott was a household name in New Zealand during her lifetime. New Zealand academic Terry Sturm wrote that she was "the first popular novelist to set all her fiction in New Zealand and to think of her readership as primarily a New Zealand one". Her books had better New Zealand sales figures than any other New Zealand author. Her novels were also popular overseas and translated into several European languages. In Germany she had several bestsellers; her book Breakfast at Six, first published in 1953 and the most popular of her novels, was translated into German and published as Frühstück um Sechs by Goldmann in 1956, and a new edition was published by Weltbild in 2001. An article in The Press in 1957 noted that very few other New Zealand authors had had works translated into foreign languages at that time, save Katherine Mansfield and Ngaio Marsh.

== Selected works ==
- (As Marten Stuart) Where the Apples Redden (1934)
- (As Marten Stuart) As Shadows Flee (1936)
- Barbara and the New Zealand Back-Blocks (1936)
- Barbara Prospers (1937)
- Life With Barbara (1944)
- Five Little Plays (1946)
- More Little Plays (1949)
- Five Barbara Plays (1950)
- Barbara on the Farm (1953)
- Breakfast at Six (1953)
- Yours to Oblige (1954)
- Barbara Sees the Queen (1954)
- Pippa in Paradise (1955)
- Dinner Doesn't Matter (1957)
- The Unwritten Book (1957)
- Families are Fun (1957)
- One of the Family (1958)
- The White Elephant (1959)
- No Sad Songs (1960)
- Tea and Biscuits (1961)
- It's Perfectly Easy (1962)
- The Long Honeymoon (1963)
- A Change from Mutton (1964)
- Freddie (1965)
- Days That Have Been – An Autobiography (1966)
- What Does It Matter? (1966)
- Yes, Darling (1967)
- Turkey at Twelve (1968)
- Strictly Speaking (1969)
- Haven't We Met Before? (1970)
- If I Don't, Who Will? (1971)
- Shepherd's Pie (1972)
- First Things First (1973)
- It Was Meant (1974)
- Strangers for Tea (1975)
- Away From It All (1977)
- Board but no Breakfast (1978)

With Joyce West (1908–1985):

- Fatal Lady (1960) Hamilton NZ: Paul's Book Arcade
- Such Nice People (1962) Hamilton NZ: Paul's Book Arcade. Sydney: Angus & Robertson
- Mangrove Murder (1963) Auckland NZ: Paul's Book Arcade. London: Angus & Robertson
- No Red Herrings (1964) Auckland, NZ: Paul's Book Arcade. London: Angus & Robertson
- Who Put it There? (1965) Hamilton NZ: Blackwood & Janet Paul
