= Ivan Bootham =

New Zealand musician and writer

Ivan Thomas Bootham (20 July 1939 – 14 July 2016) was a New Zealand novelist, short story writer, poet and composer.

== Biography ==
Bootham was born in Farnworth, Lancashire, England, on 20 July 1939, the son of the painter Joe Bootham, and migrated to New Zealand as a teenager. He lived in provincial New Zealand – Invercargill, Auckland, New Plymouth, Levin, Lower Hutt – before settling in Wellington.

He worked as a book binding apprentice, farm labourer, shoe salesman, ticket writer/window dresser, radio copywriter, radio programme producer, publicity officer for the New Zealand Symphony Orchestra, and in clerical, advisory, administrative and editorial jobs for various Government departments.

Bootham became a naturalised New Zealand citizen in 1975. He was married with twin daughters, and died in Wellington on 14 July 2016. He was buried at Makara Cemetery.

== Literary works ==
Bootham's early novels and short stories attracted favourable reviews, and in 1973 he was awarded a New Zealand Literary Fund Writing Bursary.

His 1999 short story collection Ivan Bootham Stories, from Fracas Publications, includes the story "A Change Is As Good As A Rest", which was short-listed for the 1989 Mobil/Dominion Sunday Times short story contest judged by Malcolm Bradbury. His radio plays include Mutuwhenua, an imaginatively dramatised treatment of the 1886 Mt Tarawera eruption. His other pieces for radio include Bus Ominibus and But For, performed by Alan Jervis and Pat Evison and broadcast on the YC Station of the NZBC.

Bootham's most recent works include three novellas published as Quince.Noon – the Trilogy (2001); a short story collection The Book of Cheerful Despair (2002); and a novel The Doctor Jesus Sanatorium (2003). A theme in much of his fiction is that of the artist struggling to come to terms with the gap between his creative aspirations and his achievements. Bootham has been praised as a highly original comic writer. His tone ranges from the ironic to the acerbic, his constantly self-questioning characters often relishing wordplay and verbal invention. He has also had art criticism and cartoons published, including a book of musical cartoons, sff.

Bootham was a long-term friend of New Zealand's leading art dealer Peter McLeavey, and some of his reminiscences of their friendship are recorded in Jill Trevelyan's biography of McLeavey.

== Musical composition ==
An accomplished pianist and former keen trumpet player, Ivan Bootham began composing in his early teens. His music teachers included Maxwell Fernie and Loretto Cunninghame.

His best-known work to date is the opera The Death of Venus, based on his radio play of that name, which premiered in Wellington in 2002. The story is based on an historical incident in 1806, in which the brig Venus was seized at Port Dalrymple (Tasmania) by its first mate Kelly, aided by convicts, and sailed to the Bay of Islands in New Zealand. Two of the female convicts on board are believed to have been the first white women to live in New Zealand.

In 2002, Bootham completed his second opera Pictures, based on the short story of that name by New Zealand writer Katherine Mansfield.

His most recent major compositions were the mass Missa Creator Spiritus (2006) and the monodrama Bessie Blue (2009).

Among his compositions are: Three Musics (1965) for French horn, strings and harp; Sonata Movement (1969) for piano; Winter Garden (1988) for wind quintet; A String of Clichés (1996) for French horn and piano; Zuweilen (2000), six short pieces for piano; Three Lejjoon Poems (2000), a short song cycle to poems by Niel Wright; Little Blue Peep (2002) for harmonica and piano; A Wild Garden of Doggerel (2003), settings of nonsense poems by the composer for unaccompanied choir; Play On A Debussy Motif (2004) for piano; Spinning Jenny (2005) for piano duet, and a song cycle For One Who Went Away (2004), a setting of seven poems by Peter Jacobson.

== Public performances ==
On 6 October 1973, Ivan Bootham performed an assemblage of words and piano music by Erik Satie at the Govett-Brewster Art Gallery, New Plymouth. The performance grew out of a short item he wrote for radio Five Grimaces: Erik Satie Looks at Life, which was first broadcast by the NZBC in June 1971 and repeated in August 1971

In August 2009, he provided piano accompaniment for a compilation of early films of Wellington shown at the Ngaio Town Hall, Wellington. Titled A Snapshot of Wellington 1917–1966, the programme was presented by the New Zealand Film Archive and the Ngaio Community Association.

Since 2013 in particular, many video productions of Ivan Bootham's poetry and music have been posted on YouTube.
