= Craig Cliff =

New Zealand writer (born 1983)

- Born: 1983 (age 42–43); Palmerston North
- Education: Victoria University of Wellington
- Occupation: writer
- Writing career
- Genre: fiction

Craig Cliff (born 1983) is a New Zealand short story writer and novelist.

== Background ==
Craig Cliff was born in Palmerston North in 1983. He graduated from Victoria University of Wellington with an MA in Creative Writing.

== Career ==
In 2007, Cliff won the novice category of the 2007 Katherine Mansfield Memorial Award for his short story "Another Language".

He won the 2011 Commonwealth Writers' Prize, Best First Book for his short story collection A Man Melting.

His first novel, The Mannequin Makers, was published in 2013. According to Sam Finnimore in The New Zealand Listener, "The Mannequin Makers lives up to its cover blurb billing Cliff as a talent to watch – it’s tremendous, darkly entertaining and original from start to finish." The novel was also published in the US, UK and in Romanian translation.

Nailing Down the Saint, Cliff's second novel, was published in 2019.

From 2010 to 2014, Cliff wrote a fortnightly column for the Dominion Post. He participated in the University of Iowa's International Writing Program in 2013.

In 2015 Cliff was a recipient of Eleanor Catton's Horoeka Grant. In response he wrote an essay on the rise of professional video gaming. He received the 2017 Robert Burns Fellowship.

== Works ==
=== Short story collections ===
- A Man Melting Vintage, 2010, ISBN 978-1-86979-192-6

=== Novels ===
- The Mannequin Makers Vintage, 2013, ISBN 978-1-77553-384-9
- Nailing Down the Saint Vintage, 2019, ISBN 978-0-14377-374-0
