= Nellie Coad =

NZ teacher, community leader, writer

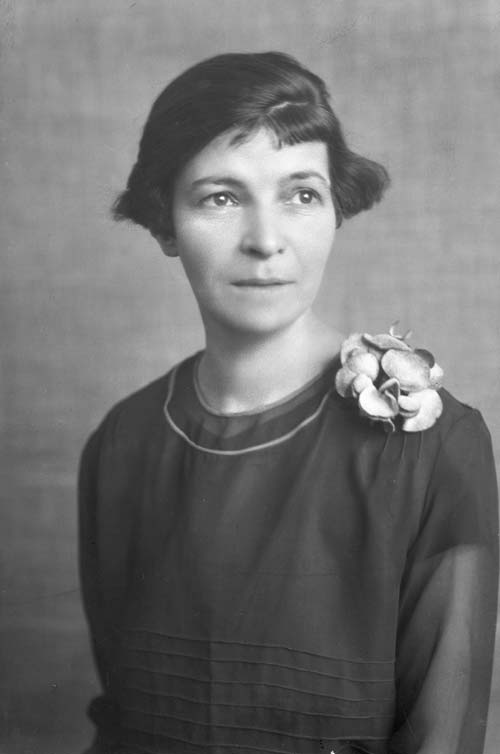
- Coad, photographed in her role as a teacher at Wellington Girls' College, c. 1936
- Born: Nellie Euphemia Coad; 15 October 1883; New Plymouth, New Zealand
- Died: 6 September 1974 (aged 90); Runwell, England
- Education: MA, Victoria College (1914)
- Occupations: Teacher; community leader; writer

Nellie Euphemia Coad (15 October 1883 – 6 September 1974) was a New Zealand teacher, community leader, women's advocate and writer. She was an early advocate for educational and career opportunities for women, and for many years led and participated in the New Zealand Women Teachers' Association (NZWTA), where she fought for better salaries for female teachers and equal accommodation for female student athletes.

== Early life and education ==
Coad was born in New Plymouth, New Zealand, in 1883. She was the daughter of Annie McLauchlan, an Australian teacher, and James Coad, a brewer. The family moved back to Australia for a short time and she attended primary school in Victoria, Australia. By 1893 the family had returned to New Zealand, living in the Aro Valley suburb of Wellington (then called Mitchelltown), and Coad's mother was one of the signatories of the 1893 Women's Suffrage Petition. Coad attended Wellington Girls' College (then Wellington Girls' High School). She received an MA with honours in mental philosophy from Victoria College in 1914.

== Career ==
Coad became a pupil-teacher at Thorndon School in 1903 and for the next 13 years taught at several different primary schools in Wellington. As a young teacher she gave evidence before the 1912 Education Commission, chaired by Mark Cohen, and argued in favour of better salaries for female schoolteachers. From 1917 to 1938, she taught at Wellington Girls' College, where she became the head of the department of history, civics and geography, and authored several textbooks on the same subjects. She was known as a disciplinarian and one of her pupils later said she "gave good strong signposts through the confused paths of history". Her general history of New Zealand, New Zealand: From Tasman to Massey (1934) was widely used in schools throughout the country.

Coad sat on the executive committee of the New Zealand Educational Institute, was a member of the University Entrance Board and was vice-president of the New Zealand Secondary Schools' Association. She served as vice-president of the National Council of Women of New Zealand in 1921–22 and as president of the Council's Wellington branch in 1922–23. She was the founding president of the New Zealand Women Writers' and Artists' Society from 1932 to 1934.

Coad had a particular interest in advocating for educational and career opportunities for women, and for many years took a leading role in the New Zealand Women Teachers' Association (NZWTA), where she fought for better salaries for female teachers and equal accommodation for female student athletes. She was founding secretary of the Wellington branch from 1914 to 1916 and national president from 1920 to 1924. She was one of three women elected to the New Zealand government's advisory Council of Education in 1915, and at the third conference of the NZWTA in 1916, opposed the Council's recommendation that all secondary school girls be taught home science. She argued that girls should receive a good general education, rather than being required to specialise early which would limit their choices of career. On her retirement from the presidency of the NZWTA, it was said that she was "one of the foremost workers in the interests of the girls and women in our schools", and that the NZWTA's success was largely owed to her.

== Later life ==
In 1934, Coad's mother, who had been living with her, died. After retiring from teaching at the end of 1938, Coad toured Europe, eventually living in England, and served as an air raid warden in London during World War II. She was hospitalised for several weeks as a result of injuries sustained in this role. She also attended several PEN International conferences on behalf of PEN New Zealand, including a 1939 conference in New York where she met Thomas Mann and had lunch with Franklin and Eleanor Roosevelt. On a return visit to New Zealand in 1947 she said she hoped women would become a stronger force in political life post-war.

Coad died at Runwell, Essex, in September 1974.
