= Strange Meetings =

Strange Meetings: The Lives of the Poets of the Great War
- Author: Harry Ricketts
- Genre: non-fiction, biography
- Publisher: Chatto & Windus, Pimlico
- Publication date: 2010
- Pages: x, 278 pages
- ISBN: 9781845951801
- OCLC: 823892234

Strange Meetings: The Lives of the Poets of the Great War is a non-fiction book by Harry Ricketts, first published by Chatto & Windus in 2010. The book is a kind of collective biography of the major poets of World War I, in the form of documented or speculated meetings between the individual poets, covering a period between 1914 and 1964. The poets whose careers are described include Vera Brittain, Rupert Brooke, Robert Graves, Ivor Gurney, David Jones, Robert Nichols, Wilfred Owen, Isaac Rosenberg, Siegfried Sassoon and Edward Thomas. The title of the book is a variation on the title of "Strange Meeting", a poem by Wilfred Owen, which itself is taken from a phrase in Shelley's The Revolt of Islam.

The first meeting covered in the book is that between Sassoon and Brooke in July 1914, shortly before the outbreak of the war, at the London home of Edward Marsh, the only occasion on which the two poets exchanged words. Sassoon later documented their brief conversation about Rudyard Kipling, on whom Ricketts has also written.

== Critical reception ==
The book was reviewed in the Arts sections of major UK and New Zealand newspapers, with varying critical responses. The Sunday Express called it "beautifully written and elegant and places in context that handful of hauntingly sad and stomach-wrenchingly painful poems which feature in every school anthology alongside an overview of less familiar work" The Friends of the Dymock Poets Newsletter asked "how it came to be commissioned". Tim Kendall, reviewing it on behalf of the War Poets Association, said "My expectations were low, the reviews having been lukewarm", but added that the book "illustrates, entertainingly and sensitively, the extraordinary extent to which the war poets were reading each other, virtually from the start".
