= Ivy Gibbs =

New Zealand poet

Ivy Olive Gibbs (c. 1886 – 3 October 1966) was a trans-Tasman poet and children's writer based predominantly in New Zealand. Her verse in The Bulletin, Australia, made her well known between 1920 and 1930, and she was widely published in New Zealand between the late 1920s and 1941. Children's verses by Gibbs appeared in The Christian Science Monitor in Boston, North America, 1944–49.

== Life ==
It is thought that Gibbs was born and educated in England. Little is known about her early life. At some point, she moved to Australia, and it is possible she was educated at the Hyde Park School of Music in Adelaide 1907–10.

From 1913 to 1918, Gibbs seems to have lived in Coonalpyn, South Australia. Newspaper reports about Coonalpyn associated her with concerts at Coonalpyn Hall socials and fundraisers for the local school and Red Cross Society during World War I. From 1920 to 1927, her poems in the Sydney Bulletin give her location as New South Wales.

She arrived in New Zealand from Sydney aboard the Ulimaroa in Wellington, 1 June 1926, and is on the New Zealand Electoral Roll for 1928 in Eden, Auckland. In the 1930s, she was on the committee of the New Zealand Women Writers' and Artists' Society (1932–34) (later known as the New Zealand Women Writers' Society) in Wellington.

After leaving Wellington in 1934, Pat Lawlor in his regular column ‘Among the Books’ for New Zealand Railways Magazine wrote: "Miss Ivy Gibbs, a writer of slender but charming verse, is now a resident of Napier."

The history of the New Zealand Women Writers' Society says from Napier she moved to Australia.

After Australia, she returned to Auckland. The New Zealand Electoral Roll has her as Ivy Gibbs and Ivy Olive Gibbs in Auckland from 1938 to 1963. She is listed as a 'spinster' and later 'retired'.

Ivy Gibbs died in Auckland on 3 October 1966. She was 80 years of age suggesting her birth was 1865 or 1866. A service was held for her at the Waikumete Chapel Crematorium on Thursday 6 October 1966.

== Literary output ==
The Bulletin (1920–30) and the literary magazine New Zealand Mercury (1933–36) collect much of Gibbs's poetry. A critic referred to her in Sydney, Australia, 1923, as ‘the golden-haired and golden-hearted girl who has written much delightful verse this year.’

Prior to The New Zealand Mercury and while appearing in The Bulletin, Gibbs also published verse in the New Zealand Radio Record and various Australian papers and journals such as the Sydney Morning Herald, Green Room May, Birth: A Little Journal of Australian Poetry, the Triad, and the Australian Woman's Mirror.

A poem of hers 'The Thrush' appeared in the anthology of contemporary New Zealand verse Kowhai Gold (1930) edited by Quentin Pope reproduced from The Bulletin, 21 July 1927, and another in A Gift Book of New Zealand Verse (1931) edited by "John O’ Dreams" (Helen Longford) reproduced from the New Zealand Radio Record.

She had further publications in the Advocate in Burnie and the Launceston Examiner, both in Tasmania, 1937-41 (some republished from the Auckland New Zealand Herald). Gibbs also wrote notable World War II poems: ‘Requiescat in Pace’ and ‘Death's No Enemy’ both first published in the New Zealand Herald and later The Advocate in Burnie.

From 1944 to 1949, children's verse of hers appeared under her full name of ‘Ivy Olive Gibbs’ in the international newspaper The Christian Science Monitor in Boston, North America.

Two books of her poetry were published in England: Six Days in a Pensive Mood (1949) and The Day is in a Pensive Mood (1949). The latter book is held by the Hocken Collections in Dunedin, New Zealand.

In 2012, New Zealand poet, editor and critic Mark Pirie compiled a bio-bibliography for her.

Mark Pirie has since compiled five collections of her poetry posthumously through Original Books, Wellington, 2012-2015. Pirie also compiled a supplementary bio-bibliography to her.

In 2026, Mark Pirie edited her Selected Poems as an introduction to her verse comprising 20 of her poems selected from newspapers, magazines and anthologies.

== Poetry collections by Ivy Gibbs ==
- Six Days in a Pensive Mood (Arthur H Stockwell: Ilfracombe, 1949)
- The Day is in a Pensive Mood (Arthur H Stockwell: Ilfracombe, 1949)
- A Golden Ship and Other Uncollected Poems for Children (Original Books: Wellington, 2012)
- Young Moon: Collected and Uncollected Poems from The Bulletin 1920-1930 (Original Books: Wellington, 2012).
- The Wind Boy and Other Uncollected Poems 1924-1941 (Original Books: Wellington, 2012).
- Making Songs and Other Uncollected Poems (1927-1941) (Original Books, Wellington, 2015).
- The Dreamer and Other Uncollected Poems from Australian Newspapers (1922-1948) (Original Books, Wellington, 2015).
- Selected Poems ed. Mark Pirie (The Night Press, Wellington 2026).
