= Joe Bootham =

New Zealand painter

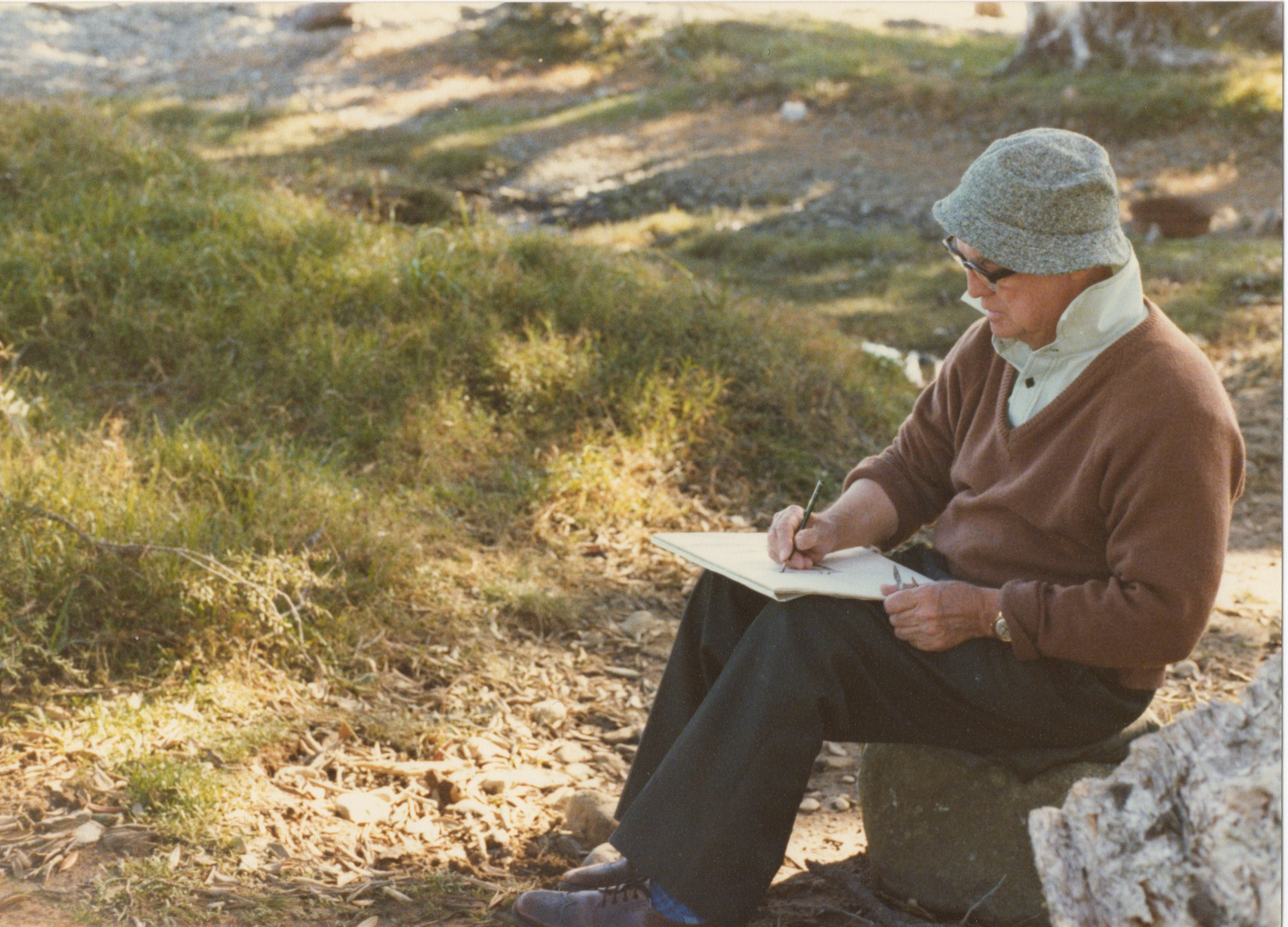
Joe Bootham in 1980

Joe (Joseph) Bootham (12 December 1911 – 16 May 1986) was a New Zealand painter who was noted for his landscape drawings and paintings and for portraiture.

== Life and works ==
Joe Bootham was born in Bolton, Lancashire, England. His formal art training, mostly undertaken in the late 1920s, consisted of various short art courses and private tuition. He married Amy Yates in 1937.

He was a sometime member of the Bolton Art Circle, Burnley Modern Art Group, and The Independents. The latter were a group of Bolton artists who, in the early 1950s, met and exhibited at "Smokey Joe’s", a coffee bar popular with patrons of the nearby theatres and cinema.

In 1961 he emigrated to New Zealand, travelling on the passenger liner The Southern Cross. Among his pocketbook-sized sketches of passengers on board the ship was one of Peter McLeavey, who, from 1966 onwards, was to become a well-known dealer in contemporary New Zealand art. Their shipboard acquaintance was to become a friendship of significance in 1962, when McLeavey spent time in Wanganui, where Bootham was then living. During McLeavey's many visits to Bootham's home, the artist executed the large pastel portrait of him now in the Alexander Turnbull Library collection. The significance of that friendship is expanded on in Jill Trevelyan's biography of McLeavey.

In Wanganui, Bootham was a frequent exhibitor with the Wanganui Art Society. He also taught at Society meetings. Rejection for exhibition of his painting "The Day I Rode the Blue Bull Through China" provoked some controversy in local art circles.

During the 1960s he came to know and admire the work of Edith Collier. Though she died before he had the chance to meet her, in 1974, in the company of other Wanganui Art Society members, he visited her former home where he met two of her surviving sisters. He also took the opportunity while there to do four drawings of trees and shrubbery in the garden about the home. The drawings are dated in the artist's hand 27.3.74.

In 1966, when visiting New Plymouth, he met New Zealand regionalist painter Michael Smither and began a continuing friendship that was artistically stimulating and rewarding.

From the mid-1960s until about 1970 he rented an old farm house in the Longacre Valley on the outskirts of Wanganui for use as a weekend retreat and studio. He responded to the New Zealand light and contour of the land and independently evolved a clear-edged style. During this period he produced a particularly distinctive group of paintings and drawings.

Bootham's ability to capture the unique light and landscape characteristics of a particular country is a skill also revealed in his paintings done in England, Scotland, Australia, and North Africa and Palestine (when posted there 1945–47 with the Royal Signals).

After a heart attack in 1969, his health did not allow him to engage as directly with the natural world as he had hitherto. Now more studio-bound he became experimental in his treatment of subject matter. In 1973 he developed his concept of merging subject matter with light, which culminated in a number of visionary watercolours, such as: Daybreak Over the Falls, the series That Indwelt With Light, and Woodland.

In 1973 he moved to Castlecliff on the outskirts of Wanganui, which resulted in increased physical and mental isolation. His art work became more reliant on past experiences and the inner life. His art of this period was influenced by his interest in myth, religion, history, memory, time and space, psychology (general and autobiographical), and philosophy. In 1979 he finished the last of five oils known as the Quest Series.

He ceased painting in 1982 due to deteriorating health. His last works are drawings of a Coromandel river, done while on holiday.

He spent the last years of his life pursuing his long-held interest in other languages (Anglo Saxon, Middle English, Spanish, French), listening to recorded music (during his last months a record of Schubert trios was an almost permanent resident on the turntable), and reading widely – something he had always done.

On his death he left behind a substantial body of work: drawings, watercolours, pastels, and oils. As an indicator of what that number might be, consider that in the spare time available to him when in the Royal Signals (mid-1944 to January 1947) he completed 722 art works – predominantly drawings, but also many watercolours and some pastels – and the vast bulk of that number were done in the period November 1945 (when posted to Benghazi) to October 1946 (when posted to Haifa) through to January 1947.

Joe Bootham is the father of New Zealand writer and composer Ivan Bootham.

== Exhibitions ==
- 1990 One-man show Christopher Moore Gallery, Wellington.
- 1988 Group exhibition Images of the Wanganui River, Sarjeant Gallery.
- 1988 Group show Self Portraits, Christopher Moore Gallery.
- 1987 One-man show Christopher Moore Gallery.
- 1975 Group show Downtown Gallery, Wanganui.
- 1974 Three-person show, Rothmans Cultural Centre, Wellington.
- 1972 Three-person show, Rothmans Cultural Centre, Wellington.
- 1971 One-man show The Dutch Mill Tea and Coffee House, Wanganui.
- 1967 One-man show The Dutch Mill Tea and Coffee House, Wanganui.
- 1962-c1974 Exhibited with North Taranaki, Hutt and Wanganui Art Societies.

== Art sales ==
- Australian Art Sales Digest

== Represented ==
- Alexander Turnbull Library, Wellington (a portrait of Peter McLeavey, 1962).
- Sarjeant Gallery, Wanganui.
