= Rowan Metcalfe =

New Zealand writer and journalist

- Born: 1955; Taupiri, New Zealand
- Died: 2003 (aged 47–48)
- Occupations: Novelist; short-story writer; poet; journalist
- Writing career
- Notable work: Transit of Venus (2004)
- Notable awards: Katherine Mansfield Memorial Award, 1997

Rowan Metcalfe (1955–2003), also known as Rowan Pahutini, was a New Zealand novelist, short-story writer, poet, editor and journalist. She won the Katherine Mansfield Memorial Award for a short story in 1997, having won the Young Writers award in 1974, and her first and only novel Transit of Venus was published posthumously in 2004.

== Biography ==
Metcalfe was born in Taupiri in 1955. She grew up on a sheep farm near Gisborne and began writing as a young child. She was encouraged in her endeavours by her school English teacher, Betty Gilderdale.

In 1974, she won the Katherine Mansfield Short Story Award for Young Writers for the short story "We Must Thank God", which was subsequently published in Landfall. She moved to England in 1975 and spent nearly twenty years working as an editor of a political magazine and raising her children. In 1995 she returned to New Zealand and moved to Whangamatā, where she began working as a journalist. In 1997, she won the Bank of New Zealand Katherine Mansfield Short Story Award for her short story "North Sea". She had previously come third in the Sunday Star-Times short story competition with "Perfume" (in 1996) and third in the Quote Unquote short story competition (earlier in 1997).

Her short story "North Sea" was subsequently published in the 2002 collection Essential New Zealand Short Stories, edited by Owen Marshall. In the same year "Perfume" was published in Marshall's collection Authors' Choice: Leading New Zealand Writers Select Their Best Stories — And Explain Why. Reviewer Margaret Agnew noted that the main character's blindness "allows Metcalfe to create a strange and exotic world out of the everyday mundane".

In 1997, Metcalfe began writing a biography of her Polynesian ancestor, Mauatua, who left Tahiti in 1791 aboard the Bounty. She described it as being a blend of fact and fiction. In 1999 she was awarded $8,000 funding by Creative New Zealand to support the novel. Around this time she was using the name Rowan Pahutini.

== Death and Transit of Venus ==
Metcalfe died in 2003. Her novel, Transit of Venus, was published posthumously in 2004 by Huia Publishers in New Zealand and by Pandanus Books in Australia. A French translation was published in Tahiti in 2006. She dedicated the book to her father and siblings, and described it as a "mediation on my ancestors".

The novel was praised by Witi Ihimaera as "an intriguing tale that challenges the way history has been constructed". Reviewer Susan Jacobs for The New Zealand Herald observed that it was sad that Metcalfe did not live to see the book published, and described the novel as "vibrant, passionate yet ultimately unwieldy". Joan Rosier-Jones for the New Zealand Review of Books called the book as a "well-paced and a compelling read", praised Metcalfe's meticulous research, and concluded that "Rowan Metcalfe's death while still in her 40s is a tremendous loss to New Zealand literature".
