= Meg Campbell =

New Zealand poet

- Born: Aline Margaret Andersen; 19 November 1937; Palmerston North, New Zealand
- Died: 17 November 2007 (aged 69); Pukerua Bay, New Zealand
- Occupation: Poet
- Spouse: Alistair Te Ariki Campbell (m. 1958)
- Children: 3

Aline Margaret Campbell (née Andersen, 19 November 1937 – 17 November 2007) was a New Zealand poet. She began writing in 1969, and became known as a poet after publishing several well-received collections in the 1980s. Many of her poems deal with issues of mental illness and domestic life, and with her life on the Kāpiti Coast.

== Personal life ==
Campbell was born and raised in Palmerston North. She had a difficult childhood and was sent to boarding school at age eight; she was later expelled from Samuel Marsden Collegiate School in Wellington. She studied acting at Victoria University for a period and obtained a speech and drama qualification from Trinity College. She gave up her promising acting career shortly after marrying fellow poet Alistair Te Ariki Campbell in 1958, having met him the previous year at a book party. They had three children together, and in the early 1960s moved to the Kāpiti Coast region.

After her first child was born, Campbell suffered from a combination of postpartum depression and bipolar disorder, and had a nervous breakdown. In 1969 she began writing poetry at Porirua Psychiatric Hospital, wanting to regain her identity. The topic of her long-term experience with depression and mental institutions is expressed through a variety of her poetry.

== Work ==
Campbell's first published poem was "Solitary Confinement" in 1978 in the New Zealand Listener. At this time she was beginning to recover from her depression. Her first collection of poetry The Way Back (1981) won the PEN Best First Book Award for poetry. She published four further collections during her lifetime, and was featured in the collection How Things Are (1996) along with three other New Zealand poets. Campbell, Tina Callwood, Maxine Montgomery and others were also involved with editing Kapiti Poems which started as an anthology in late 1983 and became a small magazine with nos. 1-7, from 1984-1994. By the 1990s it was a substantial publication.

Campbell died at home in Pukerua Bay in 2007. Her final collection, Poems Adrift, was published one day after her death. In 2008 her husband edited and published a collection of poems written by each of them titled It's Love, Isn't It? They had agreed before their death that they would publish a collection together; reviewer Graham Brazier said their "poems of enduring love have a truly timeless quality".

Her personal papers, including early drafts of her poems, are held by the National Library of New Zealand.

Her work appears in anthologies of New Zealand poetry including The Penguin Book of New Zealand Verse (1985), The Penguin Book of Contemporary New Zealand Poetry (1989), An Anthology of New Zealand Poetry in English (1997), Essential New Zealand Poems (2001) and Essential New Zealand Poems: Facing the Empty Page (2014).

== Style and themes ==
Campbell's poetry expresses her personal experiences and struggles, and often demonstrates wit and a sense of humor. In The Oxford Companion to New Zealand Literature, Roger Robinson suggests that the role of mythology within her poetry speaks about gender roles and sexuality as well as domesticity; he states that Campbell's poetry "can form unexpected links, between the mythic and the domestic, for instance, as in 'Maui', or the universal and psychological, as in 'Things Random' or 'Evolution'." The Cambridge Guide to Women's Writing in English and Robinson both describe Campbell's voice as strong. Her work often features a sense of place in the Kāpiti Coast region, where she lived for most of her life.

== Bibliography ==
Poetry

- The Way Back (Te Kotare Press, 1981)
- A Durable Fire (Te Kotare Press, 1982)
- Orpheus and other poems (Te Kotare Press, 1990)
- How Things Are with Harry Ricketts, J C Sturm and Adrienne Jansen (Whitireia Publishing and Daphne Brasell Associates Press, 1996)
- The Better Part (Hazard Press, 2000)
- Resistance edited by Mark Pirie (Earl of Seacliff Art Workshop, 2005)
- Poems Adrift (Te Kotare Press, 2007)
- Poem for Lisa (broadsheet, The Night Press, 2007)
- It's Love, Isn't It?: The Love Poems with Alistair Te Ariki Campbell (HeadworX Publishers, 2008)

As editor

- Kapiti Coast Poems compiled with Tina Callwood and Maxine Montgomery (Rawhiti Press, 1983)
- Kapiti Poems nos. 1-6 edited with Tina Callwood, Maxine Montgomery, Patricia Reesby and others (Rawhiti Press, 1984-1992)
- Kapiti Poems 7 edited with Maxine Montgomery (Rawhiti Press, Whitireia Publishing and Daphne Brasell Associates Press, 1994)
