= Willow Macky =

Willow Macky QSM
- Birth name: Katherine Faith Macky
- Born: 25 June 1921
- Origin: New Zealand
- Died: 10 December 2006 (aged 85)
- Occupation: Songwriter
- Formerly of: Dorothea Franchi

Katherine Faith Macky QSM (25 June 1921 – 10 December 2006), also known as Willow Macky, was a New Zealand songwriter. She frequently collaborated with Dorothea Franchi.

In the 2006 New Year Honours, Macky was awarded the Queens Service Medal for community service. She died on the 10th of December 2006.
