= Michael O'Leary (pioneer) =

- Born: 4 August 1858; Spring Hill, Brisbane
- Died: 17 August 1930 (aged 72); Cairns
- Other names: Coyyan
- Occupations: prospector, journalist
- Years active: 1880–1930
- Known for: newspaper published bush diary extracts from prospecting & exploring wet tropical forests

Michael O'Leary (1858–1930) was one of north-east Queensland's pioneers who explored, prospected, and lived most of his life in the wet tropics. He was once known for his newspaper writings, sharing his locally acquired knowledge using the pen-name "Coyyan".

== Biography ==
His father, Thomas O'Leary, arrived on the third boat into Moreton Bay as second mate to the vessel, marrying Mary Mangan, one of the passengers, taking up a farming block on the Logan River trying to grow arrowroot, then becoming a teamster taking many trips to the Gympie goldfields, before moving to Brisbane where, in 1858, second son Michael O'Leary was born in Springhill. Michael O'Leary's siblings were John Joseph (1954-1933), Margret (1862-1944), Thomas Mangan (1865-1897), Mary (born 1868), and Brigid (born 1871).

In March 1881, Michael O'Leary left Brisbane on the ship Katoomba for the Palmer Goldfields in the far north of Queensland to prospect and travel widely through north-east Queensland's wet tropics, writing about his experiences in local and southern papers, living in North Queensland until he died, in Cairns, on 17 August 1930, aged 72. O'Leary's brothers John Joseph and Thomas Mangan had also migrated to the far north of Queensland, with elder brother John outliving Michael O'Leary having played a prominent role within the Cairns' provisional boards and local governments, and his younger brother having died in a horse accident at Irvinebank.

== Pioneer ==
After Michael O'Leary completed an apprenticeship as a printer in Brisbane, he left for the Palmer Goldfields to the north of Queensland where he met and befriended north-east Queensland explorer and prospector, Christie Palmerston, travelling with Palmerston on several prospecting trips through the wet tropical forests between Cooktown and Cardwell exploring and storing up knowledge of the wet tropical forests and ranges.

As a prospector, O’Leary was one of the first Anglo-Australians to arrive in the upper Tully River area in the early 1880s. He employed local Aboriginal men in his pursuit of alluvial gold.

== Writings ==
During his years prospecting in the rainforests, O’Leary kept a notebook and wrote a bush diary which he later published as widely read extracts in local newspapers, under the name Coyyan (a local Aboriginal word for white quartz), with his writings being printed in all of North Queensland's leading newspapers, also appearing in the southern newspapers.

As a writer, O'Leary included writings about the wet tropical ranges and the Aboriginal peoples for whom these ranges and forests were home, including notably learning from Aboriginal peoples and writing about Aboriginal bush living and own names for water falls, bodies of water, mountain peaks, and landscape features previously unknown and unnamed by the Queensland state.
