= Peter Jacobson (poet) =

New Zealand poet

Peter Michael Jacobson (29 November 1925 – 14 February 1998) was a New Zealand poet.

== Life and works ==
Jacobson began writing poetry at around the age of 15. While he was a student at the University of Canterbury, he contributed verse to three issues of Canterbury Lambs, published by the Canterbury University Literary Club between 1946 and 1949.

Jacobson is known for two volumes of poetry: "Poems" (1985), with illustrations by Michael Smither, and "The Unfashionable Goddess" (1995) with illustrations by Lisa Barbour.

Commenting on how The Unfashionable Goddess had come into being, Jacobson said: "I like writing lyric poetry - although writing lyric love poetry is definitely not the thing in New Zealand at the moment."

Seven poems from the collection have been set for low voice and piano by composer Ivan Bootham in the song cycle "For One Who Went Away". Bootham said that besides the touches of surreal magic realism in Jacobson's lyric poetry, he also wrote poetry on social/political topics that was bitingly satirical.

He was described by hs daughter, journalist Julie Jacobson, as a man who "despised convention, and made sure everybody knew it. . . We grew up surrounded by his books, his poetry, his music and his cigar smoke. There was always an overgrown tangle of garden. . . Religion, like politics and trees, was a favourite topic of conversation or confrontation. Dad called himself variously a pantheist, an atheist and a humanist."

After a career in the insurance industry in such places as Greymouth, New Plymouth, and Wellington, Peter Jacobson retired in Akaroa with his wife Jeanette, who was also a poet and wrote under the name J. Esther Broun.

He was a friend of the New Zealand painter Toss Woollaston.
