= Alice Glenday =

New Zealand writer (c.1920–2004)

- Born: c. 1920; Canada
- Died: November 7, 2004 (aged 84); Palmerston North, New Zealand
- Resting place: Kelvin Grove Cemetery
- Occupation: Writer
- Children: 2
- Writing career
- Notable awards: Katherine Mansfield Memorial Award

Alice Maria Glenday (c. 1920–7 November 2004) was a New Zealand novelist, short story writer and playwright. Born in Canada, she moved to New Zealand in 1949 as a young married woman, and began writing in the mid-1950s. In 1969 she was the first woman to receive the Katherine Mansfield Memorial Award for her short story "One Fine Day". She published two novels, Follow, Follow (1973) and A Population of One (1991), and won several playwriting competitions run by the British Drama League.

== Life and career ==
Glenday was born in Canada and moved to New Zealand in 1949, after marrying a New Zealander during World War II. She started writing in the mid-1950s, after her husband remarked that her letters home to Canada could fill a book, and her first short story was published in the Toronto Star Weekly. In 1956 she joined the New Zealand Women Writers' Society. She later had short stories published in New Zealand magazines like The Listener, and many of her early short stories were published under a penname. In 1957 she won the children's play and religious play sections of a contest run by the British Drama League. In 1958 her radio-play "Under the Stars" was the first New Zealand play to be recorded and broadcast by the Christchurch radio studios. In 1959 she won the women's section of a British Drama League playwriting contest.

In 1969 she won the Katherine Mansfield Memorial Award for her short story "One Fine Day", and was the first woman to win since the award was established in 1959. In 1971 she won the Auckland Centennial Fiction contest for her first novel Follow, Follow, which was published in 1973 by Collins. A review in newspaper The Press said Glenday demonstrates "the same firm artistic control of her material which characterises her stories", concluding it was "a remarkable first novel, perceptive in its exploration of a family's relationships, and with an impressive fusion of all the elements of a novel into a compelling whole". In 1981 she was awarded second prize in the Katherine Mansfield Memorial Award for her story "Ghosts". Her second novel, A Population of One, was published in 1991 by Vintage.

Glenday and her husband had two children. By 1969 she was a widow, and in 1973 she was described by The Press as "exud[ing] a need for privacy, one which is threatened by the very publicity that allows her to concentrate on her writing". Despite having two novels published, her preferred writing medium was the short story, partially due to the better pay.

== Bibliography ==
- France, Thelma; Quinn, Hestia; Henden, Roma; Ashforth, Isobelle, eds. (1984). History of the New Zealand Women Writers' Society, 1932–1982. Wellington: The New Zealand Women Writers' Society. ISBN 0-9597705-0-X.
- Hayward, Margaret; Cowley, Joy, eds. (1982). Women Writers of NZ 1932–1982, Jubilee History and Writings of the New Zealand Women Writers' Society. Wellington: Colonial Associates. ISBN 0-9597585-4-2.
- Tolerton, Jane; Tonks, Joy, eds. (1999). "Oh, to be a Writer, a Real Writer!": Winners of the Katherine Mansfield Short Story Award, 1959–1999. Wellington: Victoria University Press. ISBN 9780864733733.
