= Johan Peter Jacobson =

Norwegian politician

Johan Peter Jacobson (27 February 1857 – ??) was a Norwegian politician for the Liberal Party.

He was elected to the Norwegian Parliament in 1900, representing the constituency of Nedenes Amt. He worked as a smith there. He served only one term.
