= Harry Ricketts =

New Zealand academic and poet (born 1950)

- Born: 1950 (age 75–76); London, United Kingdom
- Occupations: Poet; biographer; editor; anthologist; critic; academic

Academic background
- Education: Oxford University

Academic work
- Institutions: University of Hong Kong; University of Leicester; Victoria University of Wellington (International Institute of Modern Letters)

Harry Ricketts (born 1950) is a New Zealand poet, biographer, editor, anthologist, critic, academic, literary scholar and cricket writer. Born and educated in England, Ricketts began teaching poetry at Victoria University of Wellington in 1981. He has published a number of poetry collections, and written biographies of Rudyard Kipling and of a dozen British First World War poets.

== Life ==
Ricketts was born in London in 1950. His father, Jack (John) Ricketts, was a career officer in the British Army, serving in World War II and in Malaya and Hong Kong in the 1950s. Ricketts was brought up in London, Malaysia and Hong Kong. He was educated first at a prep school in Kent and later at Wellington College, Berkshire.

From an early age, Ricketts developed an interest in cricket and opened the bowling for two years for the Wellington College First XI. After school, he studied English at Oxford University completing a BA (1st Class Honours) and an MLitt on Kipling's short stories (1975). He then taught at the University of Hong Kong (1974–1977) and the University of Leicester (1978–1981) before moving to New Zealand. At Leicester, he knew the poet and critic G. S. Fraser and became friends with the poet Robert Wells.

In 1981, Ricketts took up a lectureship in the English Department at Victoria University of Wellington in New Zealand and for many years has run a Modern Poetry course, combining British, American and New Zealand poets. In the 1990s he taught poetry workshops for the Continuing Education Centre at Victoria and more recently has taught non-fiction and fiction writing courses for the IIML (International Institute of Modern Letters).

== Literary output ==
Ricketts began writing poetry at school. At Oxford he was arts editor of the student newspaper Cherwell and wrote for the OSAC magazine, interviewing writers like John Wain.

During the 1980s, he started to publish academic work, such as an edition of Rudyard Kipling's ‘lost’ New Zealand story "One Lady at Wairakei" (1983) and a valuable book of interviews with New Zealand poets, Talking about Ourselves (1986). This book introduced Ricketts to the New Zealand poetry scene, and he became friends with the Wellington poets Louis Johnson and Lauris Edmond.

He also became involved with the New Zealand Poetry Society, edited anthologies for them, was president for a time in the late 1980s, and at Victoria encouraged his students through the student publication Writings and later JAAM magazine in the 1990s, a Victoria Writer's Club magazine that became international.

Roger Robinson comments on his poetry that: "Ricketts’ best are either deftly satiric 'light verse' ... or wry commentaries on the perplexities of love, marriage or parenthood."

Aside from his own literary writing, Ricketts has been an anthologist since the 1990s. His work in this field includes How You Doing?: A Selection of New Zealand Comic and Satiric Verse (1998), with Hugh Roberts, and a two-volume series of spiritual verse anthologies, co-edited with Paul Morris and Mike Grimshaw, before editing The Awa Book of New Zealand Sports Writing (2010). His sports anthology was one of the Best 100 Books of 2010 in the New Zealand Listener.

A Wall Street Journal reviewer observed of The Unforgiving Minute that: 'of all the Kipling biographies, Harry Ricketts is the most balanced.' The New Yorker reviewer in turn noted that 'Ricketts, a poet, is invaluable in analysing the subtleties and the modernist techniques that went into Kipling's popular, accessible work.'

In 2010, with Paula Green, he co-authored the poetry primer 99 Ways into New Zealand Poetry (2010). He has also contributed scholarly entries to the Oxford Companion to New Zealand Literature, reviewed books for Radio New Zealand National, acted as a theatre critic for the New Zealand Listener (1998–2007), and co-edited the review journal New Zealand Books since the late 1998.

Ricketts was awarded the Pou Aronui Award by Royal Society Te Apārangi in 2021.

In 2024 Ricketts published a memoir titled First Things, with a second volume titled Last Things planned to follow.

== Cricket writing ==
Ricketts published a cricket book, How to Catch a Cricket Match (2006), a guide to getting the most out of watching a day's Test cricket.

Mark Pirie included Ricketts as a cricket poet in A Tingling Catch: A Century of New Zealand Cricket Poems 1864-2009 (HeadworX, 2010) and his poem on Bob Woolmer in broadsheet. Pirie also dedicated his small booklet of cricket poems Slips to Ricketts in 2008; both having played Wellington club cricket.

In 2024, Bloomsbury published his story of an Ashes classic, Richie Benaud's Blue Suede Shoes, co-written with historian David Kynaston. It was named the Cricket Writer's Club Derek Hodgson Book of the Year. Cricket writer Gideon Haigh wrote: "A scrupulous and subtle evocation of one of cricket's forgotten classics: the Ashes of 1961." Mike Brearley wrote: "It will fascinate the keenest cricket followers, taking us back with shrewd insight to a famous Ashes Test match, but it is simultaneously an account of the social issues of the time, which are illuminated in numerous, often subtle, ways throughout."

== Publications by Harry Ricketts ==
=== Anthologies ===
- How You Doing?: A Selection of New Zealand Comic and Satiric Verse, with Hugh Roberts, Lincoln University Press/Daphne Brasell Associates Press/Whitireia Publishing, Wellington, New Zealand, 1998.
- Spirit in a Strange Land: A Selection of New Zealand Spiritual Verse, with Mike Grimshaw and Paul Morris, Random House/Godwit, Auckland, New Zealand, 2002. (Winner of the Montana Anthology and reference section 2003.)
- Spirit Abroad: A Second Selection of New Zealand Spiritual Verse, with Mike Grimshaw and Paul Morris, Random House/Godwit, Auckland, New Zealand, 2004.
- The Awa Book of New Zealand Sports Writing, Awa Press, Wellington, New Zealand, 2010.
- Running Writing Robinson (Festschrift for Professor Roger Robinson), with David Carnegie, Paul Millar, David Norton, Victoria University Press, Wellington, New Zealand, 2011.
- Essential New Zealand Poems: Facing the Empty Page, with Siobhan Harvey and James Norcliffe, Godwit, Auckland, New Zealand, 2014.

=== Biographies ===
- The Unforgiving Minute: A Life of Rudyard Kipling, Pimlico, London, UK, 1999. ISBN 0701137444 (published in the US as Rudyard Kipling: A Life, Carroll & Graf, New York City, 2000. ISBN 0786707119)
- Strange Meetings: The Lives of the Poets of the Great War, Chatto & Windus, London, UK, 2010. ISBN 9781845951801

=== Poetry ===
- Coming Under Scrutiny, Original Books, Wellington, New Zealand, 1989.
- Coming Here, Nagare Press, Palmerston North, New Zealand, 1989
- A Brief History of New Zealand Literature, Fawthorpe Garlick, Wellington, New Zealand, c.1996.
- How Things Are, with Adrienne Jansen, Meg Campbell and J. C. Sturm, Whitireia Publishing, Wellington, New Zealand, 1996.
- 13 Ways, Pemmican Press, Wellington, New Zealand, 1997.
- Nothing to Declare: Selected Writings 1977–1997, HeadworX Publishers, Wellington, New Zealand, 1998.
- Plunge, Pemmican Press, Wellington, New Zealand, 2001.
- Your Secret Life, HeadworX Publishers, Wellington, New Zealand, 2005.
- Just Then, Victoria University Press, Wellington, New Zealand, 2012.
- Half Dark, Victoria University Press, Wellington, New Zealand, 2015.
- Winter Eyes, Victoria University Press, Wellington, New Zealand, 2018.
- Selected Poems, Victoria University Press, Wellington, New Zealand, 2021.
- Bonfires on the Ice, Te Herenga Waka University Press, Wellington, New Zealand, 2025.

=== Fiction ===
- People Like Us: Sketches of Hong Kong, Eurasia Publishing Corp., Hong Kong, 1977.

=== Non-fiction/criticism ===
- How to Live Elsewhere, Four Winds Press, Wellington, New Zealand, 2004.
- How to Catch a Cricket Match, Awa Press, Wellington, New Zealand, 2006.
- 99 Ways into New Zealand Poetry, Random House/Vintage, Auckland, New Zealand, 2010.
- Richie Benaud's Blue Suede Shoes: The Story of An Ashes Classic, with David Kynaston, Bloomsbury, UK, 2024.

=== Memoir ===
- First Things, Te Herenga Waka University Press, Wellington, New Zealand, 2024.

=== Edited ===
- One Lady at Wairakei, Rudyard Kipling, Mallinson Rendel, Wellington, New Zealand, 1983.
- Talking About Ourselves: Twelve New Zealand Poets in Conversation with Harry Ricketts, Mallinson Rendel, Wellington, New Zealand, 1986.
- Worlds of Katherine Mansfield, Nagare Press, Palmerston North, New Zealand, 1991; 1992 2nd edition.
- Under Review: A Selection from New Zealand Books 1991–1996, with Bill Sewell and Lauris Edmond, Lincoln University Press/Daphne Brasell Associates Press, Lincoln, New Zealand, 1997.
- The Long Trail: Selected Poems, Rudyard Kipling, Carcanet, Manchester, UK, 2004.
