= War Poets Association =

British charitable organisation

The War Poets Association is a UK-based charitable organisation established in 2004. Launched at a reception in the British Embassy in Paris, in July 2004, it aims to promote interest in war poetry of the twentieth century, primarily in English. The association organises regular events, has a website and publishes an annual journal.

The association is interested in all poetry of conflict written during the twentieth century.

It holds records poems with the subject World War I, World War II and Spanish Civil War and conflicts between Ireland and Northern Ireland.

The current president is Tim Kendall, Professor of English at the University of Exeter.
