= Incorporated society =

Type of legal entity in New Zealand

In New Zealand, an incorporated society is a group of at least 15 people who have applied for registration under the Incorporated Societies Act 1908.

Once registered the Society constitutes a distinct legal entity which provides protection to members from debts, contracts etc. In return, members do not have a personal financial interest in the property or assets (if any) owned by the society. The vast majority of New Zealand sports clubs and organisations, charitable organisations, and community organisations operate as incorporated societies.

To maintain registration, annual returns must be made to the Registrar of Incorporated Societies . At any stage the Society may be wound up by members' resolution, creditors or the Registrar (if compliance is not maintained).
