= Michael O'Leary (writer) =

New Zealand publisher and writer

- Occupation: Writer

Michael O'Leary is a New Zealand publisher, poet, novelist, performer, and bookshop proprietor. He publishes under the imprint Earl of Seacliff Art Workshop, which he founded in 1984. He runs a bookshop with Irving Lipshaw, Kakariki Books, from the Paekakariki railway station.

== Early life ==
Born in Auckland, he was educated at the Universities of Auckland and Otago. He wrote his master's thesis on the history of small presses in New Zealand. He is the author of Alternative Small Press Publishing in New Zealand (2007). He completed a PhD in women's studies at Victoria University of Wellington on the "Social and Literary Constraints on Women Writers in New Zealand 1945 to 1970".

== Writing ==
O'Leary's novels and poetry explore his Māori (Te Arawa)– Irish Catholic heritage. His latest novel is Magic Alex's Revenge (2009), the third in 'The Dreamlander Express' trilogy comprising Unlevel Crossings (2002) and Straight (1985). His works include Surrogate Children (poems, 1981), Ten Sonnets (1985), Out of It (satirical novel, 1987), Before and After (1987), Livin’ ina Aucklan’ (1988) and The Irish Annals of New Zealand (1991).

== Publishing ==
Under the Earl of Seacliff Art Workshop imprint he has published work by a range of writers, both alternative and mainstream, including: Raewyn Alexander, Colin Lloyd Amery, Sandra Bell, John Pule, Greg O'Brien, David Eggleton, Pat Bellaney, Jeanne Bernhardt, Tony Beyer, Ken Bolton, Richard Burns, Karen Peterson Butterworth, Meg Campbell, Rosalie Carey, Frances Cherry, Jill Chan, John Daubé, Rosalind Derby, Robin Fry, Basim Furat, Brian C. Hare, Heather McPherson, Isa Moynihan, Peter Olds, Victor O'Leary, Glynn Parker, Alistair Paterson, Mark Pirie, Vivienne Plumb, Ralph Proops, Gemma Rowsell, Brian E. Turner, Nelson Wattie, Adam Wiedemann and others.

In 2009, a book of biography and criticism about Michael O'Leary and his publishing house, edited by Mark Pirie, was published. The book is entitled The Earl is in: 25 Years of the Earl of Seacliff: A to Z (2009).

O'Leary is a trustee for the Poetry Archive of New Zealand Aotearoa, a charitable trust dedicated to archiving, collecting and promoting New Zealand poetry.

== Music ==
In 2011, O'Leary collaborated with several musicians to produce an album entitled Fences Fall – Songs from the Lyrics of Michael O’Leary.
