= Mark Pirie =

New Zealand poet

Mark Pirie (born 30 April 1974) is a New Zealand poet, writer, literary critic, anthologist, publisher, and editor. He is best known for his Generation X New Zealand anthology The NeXt Wave, which included an 8,000-word introduction (1998), the literary journals JAAM (Just Another Art Movement) and broadsheet, a book cover photo series of tributes to famous rock albums, and the small press HeadworX Publishers in Wellington, New Zealand.

== Life ==
Pirie spent part of his childhood in San Francisco, 1977-1980, where he attended Town School for Boys.

Pirie was educated at Wadestown School, Wellington College, and Victoria University of Wellington, where he completed a BA (Hons). He studied Theatre and Film and English.

His MA thesis at the University of Otago was on the New Zealand poet and editor Louis Johnson, a writer who shares similarities with Pirie's work.

He spent his career as an editor in the public service in Wellington, New Zealand.

He helps co-organise the Poetry Archive of New Zealand Aotearoa since 2010, with Michael O'Leary and Dr Niel Wright and edits the newsletter.

His grandfather Tom Lawn was a rugby player and coach. He represented Canterbury B in 1925 and played for the College Rifles RFC in Auckland 1926-1929 and coached North Shore Rugby Football Club in 1938 with All Black Bert Cooke.

== Publications ==
Pirie has written or published over 200 titles listed in the National Library of New Zealand. Many are published under his own imprints HeadworX Publishers and The Night Press, Wellington or through the Earl of Seacliff Art Workshop in Paekākāriki.

The main influences on his literary development were listening to popular music, blues and jazz at an early age. His poetry draws on film, music and pop culture elements. His work also covers sports like rugby, netball, football, tennis and cricket.

Pirie's own published works include numerous collections or anthologies of poetry (one of them being a hand-made book The Bet: Poems in Memory of Jim Morrison - American Poet) and a novel in verse, TOM (2009).

He emerged in the late 1990s, being featured by Alistair Paterson in Poetry NZ 16. Paterson wrote: "Mark Pirie, still in his early twenties, has to date exhibited a combination of commitment, determination, tenacity and literary ability that is rarely encountered in a writer so young."

Critic Mark Houlahan wrote: "The pace of [Pirie's] composition must be Baxteresque, but Pirie avoids lyric excess at all costs. Urban irony is his stock in trade, across clipped short verse as well as long, Whitmanesque rants. The energy of his rhyming poems suggests an inspired Pakeha rapper."

== Award and recognition ==
Bill Sewell and Lauris Edmond included him in Essential New Zealand Poems, 2001.

In 2003, his selected poems, Gallery, was commissioned by Australian poet John Kinsella and published in England by Salt Publishing.

He was invited to contribute to the international anthology Che in Verse, a book of poetry on Che Guevara.

In 2008, he was included in the anthology New New Zealand Poets in Performance.

The anthology Voyagers: Science Fiction Poetry from New Zealand he co-edited with Tim Jones won the Sir Julius Vogel Award for Best Collected Work in 2010. His cricket poetry anthology was also published that year and launched at the Basin Reserve Longroom by historian and cricket writer Don Neely.

Ron Palenski included Pirie as a rugby poet in the anthology Touchlines, 2013.

In 2014, Pirie appeared in Essential New Zealand Poems: Facing the Empty Page. That same year All White Michael Groom wrote a foreword to a special World Cup football issue of his journal broadsheet, launched at the Brazil Embassy in Wellington, New Zealand.

Bareknuckle Books, Australia, recognised Pirie as "one of the most important New Zealand poets and editors of his generation" in the Bareknuckle Poets Pocket Series, edited by Brentley Frazer, 2016.

He was recognised as a cricket poet and editor in The Cricket Society News Bulletin edited by John Symons and the Journal of the Cricket Society in England and in Catching the Light: A New Anthology of Cricket Poetry.

== Publications by Mark Pirie ==
A selection of Mark Pirie’s books

Anthologies

- New Zealand Writing: The NeXt Wave, University of Otago Press, Dunedin, New Zealand, 1998.
- Voyagers: Science Fiction Poetry from New Zealand, with Tim Jones, IP, Brisbane, Australia, 2009.
- The Earl is in…: 25 Years of the Earl of Seacliff, Earl of Seacliff Art Workshop, Paekakariki, New Zealand, 2009.
- Rail Poems of New Zealand Aotearoa, Poetry Archive of New Zealand Aotearoa, Wellington, New Zealand, 2010
- 'A Tingling Catch': A Century of New Zealand Cricket Poems 1864-2009, foreword by Don Neely, HeadworX, Wellington, New Zealand, 2010.
- Boots: A Selection of Football Poetry 1890-2017, foreword by Michael Groom, HeadworX, Wellington, New Zealand, 2017.
- Poets XI, Earl of Seacliff Art Workshop, Paekakariki, New Zealand, 2026.

As editor

- The Pop Artist's Garland: Selected Poems 1952-2009 by F W N Wright, HeadworX, Wellington, 2010.
- King Willow: Selected Poems by Robert J Pope, HeadworX: Wellington, New Zealand, 2012.
- Selected Poems by Ivy Gibbs, The Night Press, Wellington, 2026.
- Selected Post Alexandrian Poems by F W N Wright, Earl of Seacliff Art Workshop, Paekakariki, New Zealand, 2026.

Poetry

- Shoot, Sudden Valley Press, Christchurch, New Zealand, 1999.
- No Joke, Sudden Valley Press, Christchurch, New Zealand, 2001.
- The Blues, Earl of Seacliff Art Workshop, Paekakariki, New Zealand, 2001.
- Reading the Will, Sudden Valley Press, Christchurch, New Zealand, 2002.
- Dumber: Poems, Earl of Seacliff Art Workshop, Paekakariki, New Zealand, 2003.
- Gallery: A Selection, foreword by Harry Ricketts, Salt Publishing, Cambridge, UK, 2003.
- Poems for Poets: Dedications and Elegies, Earl of Seacliff Art Workshop, Paekakariki, New Zealand, 2004.
- Giving Poetry a Bad Name: Selected Early Poems, Earl of Seacliff Art Workshop, Paekakariki, New Zealand, 2005.
- London Notebook, Earl of Seacliff Art Workshop, Paekakariki, New Zealand, 2005.
- Mahones: Four Poets, with Bill Dacker, Michael O'Leary and Iain Sharp, Earl of Seacliff Art Workshop, Paekakariki, New Zealand, 2005.
- Sounds of Sonnets, with Michael O'Leary, HeadworX Publishers, Wellington, New Zealand, 2006.
- The Search: Poems and Stories, Earl of Seacliff Art Workshop, Paekakariki, New Zealand, 2007.
- Private Detective, Kilmog Press, Dunedin, New Zealand, 2007.
- TOM: A Novel in Verse, Poets Group, Christchurch, New Zealand, 2009.
- Thinking Cap: A Book of Epigrams, Earl of Seacliff Art Workshop, Paekakariki, New Zealand, 2011.
- Old Hat: A Book of Triolets, Wellington, HeadworX, New Zealand, 2012.
- 12 Netball Poems, Wellington, The Night Press, New Zealand, 2015.
- Rock and Roll: Selected Poems in Five Sets, Bareknuckle Books, Queensland, Australia, 2016.
- Sidelights: Rugby Poems, foreword by Ron Palenski, Wellington, HeadworX, New Zealand, 2017.
- Electrimotive: Music Poems, Earl of Seacliff Art Workshop, Paekakariki, New Zealand, 2018.
- Slips: Cricket Poems, foreword by John Symons (The Cricket Society), Wellington, HeadworX, New Zealand, 2021.
- Bono Mato Poeia: Rock Poems and Drawings, Earl of Seacliff Art Workshop, Paekakariki, New Zealand, 2021.
- Tiebreaker: Tennis Poems, Wellington, The Night Press, New Zealand, 2026.
- Black Gold [In memory of James K. Baxter], Earl of Seacliff Art Workshop, Paekakariki, New Zealand, 2026.
- Songs for Her, Wellington, The Night Press, New Zealand, 2026.
- 17 Football Poems, Wellington, The Night Press, New Zealand, 2026.

Fiction

- Swing and Other Stories, Earl of Seacliff Art Workshop, Paekakariki, New Zealand, 2002.

Biography

- Tom Lawn: Mystery Forward: A Life in Business and Rugby, Earl of Seacliff Art Workshop, Paekakariki, New Zealand, 2018.

Non-fiction

- In Memoriam: Obituaries and Tributes 2008-2026, Earl of Seacliff Art Workshop, Paekakariki, New Zealand, 2026.

Art Book

- Folk Punk: Selected Photos, Artworks and Drawings 1985-2020, Earl of Seacliff Art Workshop, Paekakariki, New Zealand, 2020.
