= Joan Stevens =

New Zealand teacher, university professor of English (1908–1990)

Joan Stevens CBE (10 December 1908 – 11 June 1990) was a notable New Zealand teacher and university professor of English. She was born in Southwick, Sussex, England, in 1908.

In the 1974 Queen's Birthday Honours, Stevens was appointed a Commander of the Order of the British Empire, for services to teaching and scholarship.

Joan Stevens Hall, a university accommodation building on The Terrace in Wellington, was named after Stevens.
