= Katherine Mansfield Menton Fellowship =

New Zealand literary award

- Awarded for: New Zealand writer with record of literary achievement
- Location: Menton, France
- Country: New Zealand
- Presented by: Arts Foundation of New Zealand
- Rewards: Grant of NZ$35,000 to cover travel and living costs
- First award: 1970; 56 years ago
- Website: www.thearts.co.nz/awards/katherine-mansfield-menton-fellowship

The Katherine Mansfield Menton Fellowship, formerly known as the New Zealand Post Katherine Mansfield Prize and the Meridian Energy Katherine Mansfield Memorial Fellowship, is a New Zealand literary award. Named after Katherine Mansfield, one of New Zealand's best-known writers, the award gives winners (known as fellows) funding towards transport to and accommodation in Menton, France, where Mansfield wrote some of her most significant works.

== Overview ==
The fellowship is awarded to New Zealand citizens and residents whose fiction, poetry, literary non-fiction, children's fiction or playwriting has had "favourable impact". Unlike the Ockham New Zealand Book Awards, the fellowship is awarded to an individual to develop their future work, rather than for a specific already-published work.

In addition to funding towards transport and accommodation, fellows are given access to a room beneath the terrace of the Villa Isola Bella for use as a study. Mansfield spent long periods at the Villa Isola Bella in 1919 and 1920 after she contracted tuberculosis, and did some of her most significant work there. The climate in southern France was thought to be beneficial to her health.

The fellowship is managed by the Arts Foundation of New Zealand with the support of an advisory committee that includes members of the Winn-Manson Menton Trust.

== History ==
The fellowship was conceived in the late 1960s by New Zealand writer Celia Manson and arts patron Sheilah Winn. Manson and her husband Cecil Manson had visited the Villa Isola Bella where Mansfield did some of her most significant writing (including the short stories "The Daughters of the Late Colonel", "The Stranger" and "Life of Ma Parker"), and discovered that a room on the lower level where she worked was derelict and not in use. The Mansons and Winn decided to set up a fellowship for New Zealand authors, and formed a committee in Wellington to raise funds. Their vision was "to give a selected New Zealand writer a period of leisure to write or study ... [in] a different and more ancient culture, and thereby to see [their] own remote country in a better perspective". Initially the fellowship was administered by the New Zealand Women Writers' Society. Subsequently, the Winn-Mason Menton Trust was established to run the fellowship, and the first recipient was poet Owen Leeming in 1970.

The fellowship was first sponsored by Meridian Energy, and from 2007 to 2011 by the New Zealand Post. From 2012 to 2014, Creative New Zealand contributed a yearly grant. Over the years the fellowship also received funding from both the French and New Zealand governments. The Katherine Mansfield Room at the Villa Isola Bella was furnished by the City of Menton for the fellows' use. In 2015, a fundraising campaign overseen by the Winn-Mason Menton Trust and a volunteer campaign committee raised NZ$730,000 to ensure the fellowship's long-term survival and that it would no longer be dependent on sponsorship.

The fellowship has been awarded to a number of well-known New Zealand authors. In 2000, the Victoria University Press published As Fair as New Zealand to Me, a collection of the memories of twenty-three fellows, written in the form of letters to Mansfield. Janet Frame set her novel, In the Memorial Room, in Menton, telling the fictional story of a writer on a poetry fellowship. Although she wrote the novel in the 1970s it was not published until after her death in 2013.

Due to the COVID-19 pandemic, the 2020 fellow, Sue Wootton, was unable to travel to Menton to take up the fellowship in either 2020 or 2021.

== Recipients ==
The writers to have held the fellowship are listed below:

- 1970 Owen Leeming
- 1971 Margaret Scott
- 1972 C K Stead
- 1973 James McNeish
- 1974 Janet Frame
- 1975 David Mitchell
- 1976 Michael King
- 1977 Barry Mitcalfe
- 1978 Spiro Zavos
- 1979 Philip Temple
- 1980 Marilyn Duckworth
- 1981 Lauris Edmond
- 1982 Michael Jackson
- 1983 Allen Curnow
- 1984 Rowley Habib
- 1985 Michael Gifkins
- 1986 Michael Harlow
- 1987 Russell Haley
- 1988 Louis Johnson
- 1989 Lloyd Jones
- 1990 Lisa Greenwood
- 1991 Nigel Cox
- 1992 Maurice Gee
- 1993 Witi Ihimaera
- 1994 Vincent O’Sullivan
- 1995 Fiona Farrell
- 1996 Owen Marshall
- 1997 Roger Hall
- 1998 Maurice Shadbolt
- 1999 Elizabeth Knox
- 2000 Stephanie Johnson
- 2001 Catherine Chidgey
- 2002 Jenny Bornholdt
- 2003 Tessa Duder
- 2004 Bill Manhire
- 2005 Ian Wedde
- 2006 Fiona Kidman
- 2007 Stuart Hoar
- 2008 Damien Wilkins
- 2009 Jenny Pattrick
- 2010 Ken Duncum
- 2011 Chris Price
- 2012 Justin Paton
- 2013 Greg McGee
- 2014 Mandy Hager
- 2015 Anna Jackson
- 2016 Kate Camp
- 2017 Carl Nixon
- 2018 Paula Morris
- 2019 Sue Wootton
- 2023 Charlotte Grimshaw
- 2024 Selina Tusitala Marsh
- 2025 Fiona Samuel

== See also ==
- Katherine Mansfield Memorial Award (a prize awarded to short stories also named for Mansfield, offered from 1959 to 2014)
- List of New Zealand literary awards
