= Jacquie Kidd =

Māori health researcher

- Born: 1963

Academic background
- Education: University of Auckland, Otago Polytechnic, Otago Polytechnic
- Thesis: Aroha mai: nurses, nursing and mental illness (2008)
- Doctoral advisor: Mary Finlayson, Peter J Adams

Jacqueline Dianne Kidd (Ngāpuhi) is a Māori academic, and is a full professor at the Auckland University of Technology, specialising in Māori health and anti-racism in health practices and processes.

== Academic career ==
Kidd is affiliated to Ngapuhi through her mother, although her father was born in England of Irish heritage, and came to New Zealand in the 1950s with Wirth's Circus, where he worked with horses. The family moved around a lot when Kidd was growing up, but historically she is connected to Parawhenua and Rāwhitiroa marae. When she left school Kidd would have liked to be a journalist, but had failed school certificate. Kidd married, and by the time her marriage ended had two young children. She then qualified as a nurse at Otago Polytechnic, completing both bachelor and master of nursing degrees. Kidd completed a PhD titled Aroha mai: nurses, nursing and mental illness at the University of Auckland. Kidd then joined the faculty of the University of Auckland as a senior lecturer, leaving in 2019 to join Auckland University of Technology, where she was promoted to associate professor in 2020 and to full professor in 2023. She researches anti-racism in health services, cultural health literacy, and for fifteen years has been involved in cancer research.

Kidd says her politicisation began when she was exposed to racism during her nursing training, when a lecturer talked about Māori teen pregnancies during a paper on the social makeup of New Zealand. She says "That’s when I think I started to develop this anger and outrage at what people were being taught about us".

Kidd is the equity lead on a five-year Health Research Council-funded project to explore interventions for osteoarthritis, led by Haxby Abbott at the University of Otago.

Kidd was diagnosed with bowel cancer at the age of 58. The national New Zealand bowel cancer screening programme is available from the age of 60, despite pressure to reduce the age for Māori, who suffer greater rates of cancers, poorer prognoses, and die on average seven years earlier than non-Māori. The age of eligibility for free screening was dropped to 50 for Pacific and Māori people from late 2023.

Kidd was a finalist in the 2017 Waikato District Health Board Medical Science Awards.

== Selected works ==
- Sheridan, Nicolette Fay; Kenealy, Timothy William; Kidd, Jacqueline Dianne; Jacqueline I G Schmidt-Busby; Jennifer E Hand; Raphael, Deborah; McKillop, Ann; Harold H Rea (2012). "Patients' engagement in primary care: powerlessness and compounding jeopardy. A qualitative study". Health Expectations. 18 (1): 32–43. doi:10.1111/hex.12006. PMC 5060757. PMID 23033910. Wikidata Q37333188.
- Shemana Cassim; Lynne Chepulis; Rawiri Keenan; Kidd, Jacqueline Dianne; Firth, Melissa J.; Lawrenson, Ross (2019). "Patient and carer perceived barriers to early presentation and diagnosis of lung cancer: a systematic review". BMC Cancer. 19 (1): 25. doi:10.1186/s12885-018-5169-9. PMC 6323678. PMID 30621616. Wikidata Q60915409.
- Erena Kara; Gibbons, Veronique; Kidd, Jacqueline Dianne; Rawiri Blundell; Kingi Turner; Wayne Johnstone (2011). "Developing a Kaupapa Māori Framework for Whānau Ora". AlterNative. 7 (2): 100–110. doi:10.1177/117718011100700203. Wikidata Q124153221.
- Came, Heather Anne; O'Sullivan, Dominic; Kidd, Jacqueline Dianne; McCreanor, Tim (2020). "The Waitangi Tribunal's WAI 2575 Report: Implications for Decolonizing Health Systems". Health and Human Rights. 22 (1): 209–220. PMC 7348423. PMID 32669802. Wikidata Q97569762.
- Kidd, Jacqueline Dianne; Mary P Finlayson (2010). "Mental illness in the nursing workplace: a collective autoethnography". Contemporary Nurse. 36 (1–2): 21–33. doi:10.5172/conu.2010.36.1-2.021. PMID 21254820. Wikidata Q47327049.
