= Heather Came =

Anti-racism scholar in New Zealand

Heather Came MNZM
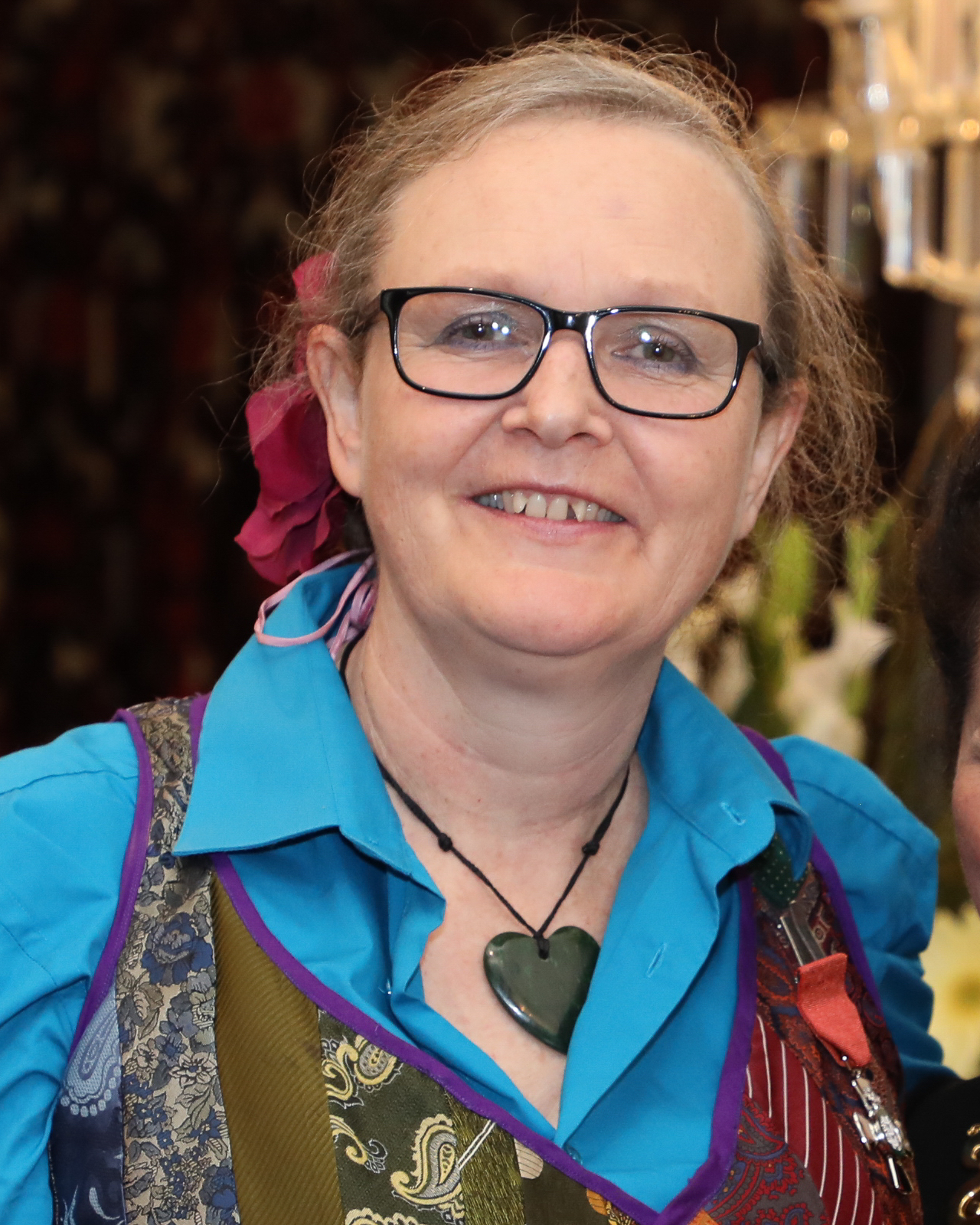
- Other name: Heather Anne Came Friar
- Awards: Member of the New Zealand Order of Merit

Academic background
- Education: University of Waikato, University of Otago, University of Canterbury
- Thesis: Institutional Racism and the Dynamics of Privilege in Public Health (2012)
- Doctoral advisor: Maria Humphries, Suzanne Lisa Parker Grant

Heather Anne Came MNZM (also known as Heather Came-Friar) is a New Zealand activist, academic and anti-racism scholar, and is an adjunct professor at Victoria University of Wellington, and an anti-racism consultant. In 2023 Came was appointed a Member of the New Zealand Order of Merit for services to Māori, education and health.

== Early life and education ==
Came is a seventh-generation Pākehā New Zealander. Came completed a Master of Political Science degree at the University of Canterbury, after which she became interested in public health. She earned a Certificate in Health Promotion from the University of Otago in Wellington, through distance learning. She then followed this with a PhD titled Institutional Racism and the Dynamics of Privilege in Public Health at the University of Waikato.

== Career ==
Came joined the faculty of the Auckland University of Technology, rising to associate professor in 2022. In 2023 she was appointed as an adjunct professor in the Department of Public Health at Victoria University of Wellington. Came conducts critical policy analysis research and activism aimed at social and racial justice, and she has campaigned for recognition of the Treaty of Waitangi. In 2013 Came founded the group STIR: Stop Institutional Racism, of which she became co-chair. In 2020 she founded a series of virtual anti-racism and decolonisation gatherings called Te Tiriti based futures + Anti racism (Decol).

== Honours and awards ==
In the New Years Honours of 2023 Came was appointed a Member of the New Zealand Order of Merit for services to Māori, education and health.

In 2021 Came jointly won the Public Health Association's Kāhui Hauora Tūmatanui Public Health Champion Award.

== Selected works ==
- Came, Heather Anne; Griffith, Derek (2017). "Tackling racism as a "wicked" public health problem: Enabling allies in anti-racism praxis". Social Science & Medicine. 199: 181–188. doi:10.1016/j.socscimed.2017.03.028. PMID 28342562. Wikidata Q53400811.
- Came, Heather Anne (2014). "Sites of institutional racism in public health policy making in New Zealand" (PDF). Social Science & Medicine. 106: 214–220. doi:10.1016/j.socscimed.2014.01.055. PMID 24583568. Wikidata Q57640728.
- Came, Heather Anne; C Doole; B McKenna; McCreanor, Tim (2017). "Institutional racism in public health contracting: Findings of a nationwide survey from New Zealand". Social Science & Medicine. 199: 132–139. doi:10.1016/j.socscimed.2017.06.002. PMID 28602358. Wikidata Q38731785.
- Came, Heather Anne; O'Sullivan, Dominic; Kidd, Jacqueline Dianne; McCreanor, Tim (2020). "The Waitangi Tribunal's WAI 2575 Report: Implications for Decolonizing Health Systems". Health and Human Rights. 22 (1): 209–220. PMC 7348423. PMID 32669802. Wikidata Q97569762.
- Came, Heather Anne; D O’Sullivan; T McCreanor (2020). "Introducing critical Tiriti policy analysis through a retrospective review of the New Zealand Primary Health Care Strategy". Ethnicities. 20 (3): 434–456. doi:10.1177/1468796819896466. Wikidata Q126406886.
- Came, Heather Anne; McCreanor, Tim; Leanne Manson (2019). "Upholding Te Tiriti, ending institutional racism and Crown inaction on health equity". The New Zealand Medical Journal. 132 (1492): 61–66. PMID 30921312. Wikidata Q92675151.
- Came, Heather Anne (2013). "Doing research in Aotearoa: a Pākehā exemplar of applyingTe Ara Tikaethical framework". Kotuitui: New Zealand Journal Of Social Sciences Online. 8 (1–2): 64–73. doi:10.1080/1177083x.2013.841265. Wikidata Q57640732.
