= Rose Frank =

New Zealand photographer (1864–1954)

- Born: 21 December 1864; Nelson, New Zealand
- Died: 6 October 1954 (aged 89); Nelson, New Zealand

Rosaline Margaret Frank (21 December 1864 – 6 October 1954), known as Rose Frank, was a New Zealand photographer.

== Biography ==
She was born in Nelson, New Zealand, on 21 December 1864. Rose, was the daughter of Christopher and Emma Frank. She attend school at the Sisters of Our Lady of the Missions at St Mary's Convent in Nelson. When she was 21, she started working as an assistant to the Tyree brothers at their photographic studio in Trafalgar Street. William Tyree was specialised in studio portraits and recording civic occasions in Nelson. His younger brother, Fred, took scenic views. Frank had excellent handwriting and the required talents for the high standard of studio photography.

She was in charge of the studio when William Tyree went overseas for two years in 1895 and again in 1910. In 1914, she purchased the studio for £750 keeping the Tyree name. In 1948, the Alexander Turnbull Library offered Rose £100 of the collection of negatives, they selected over 1000 negatives, including all of Tyree's Wellington images. She retired in 1947, selling the studio to Cecil Manson of London, but retained the collection negative.

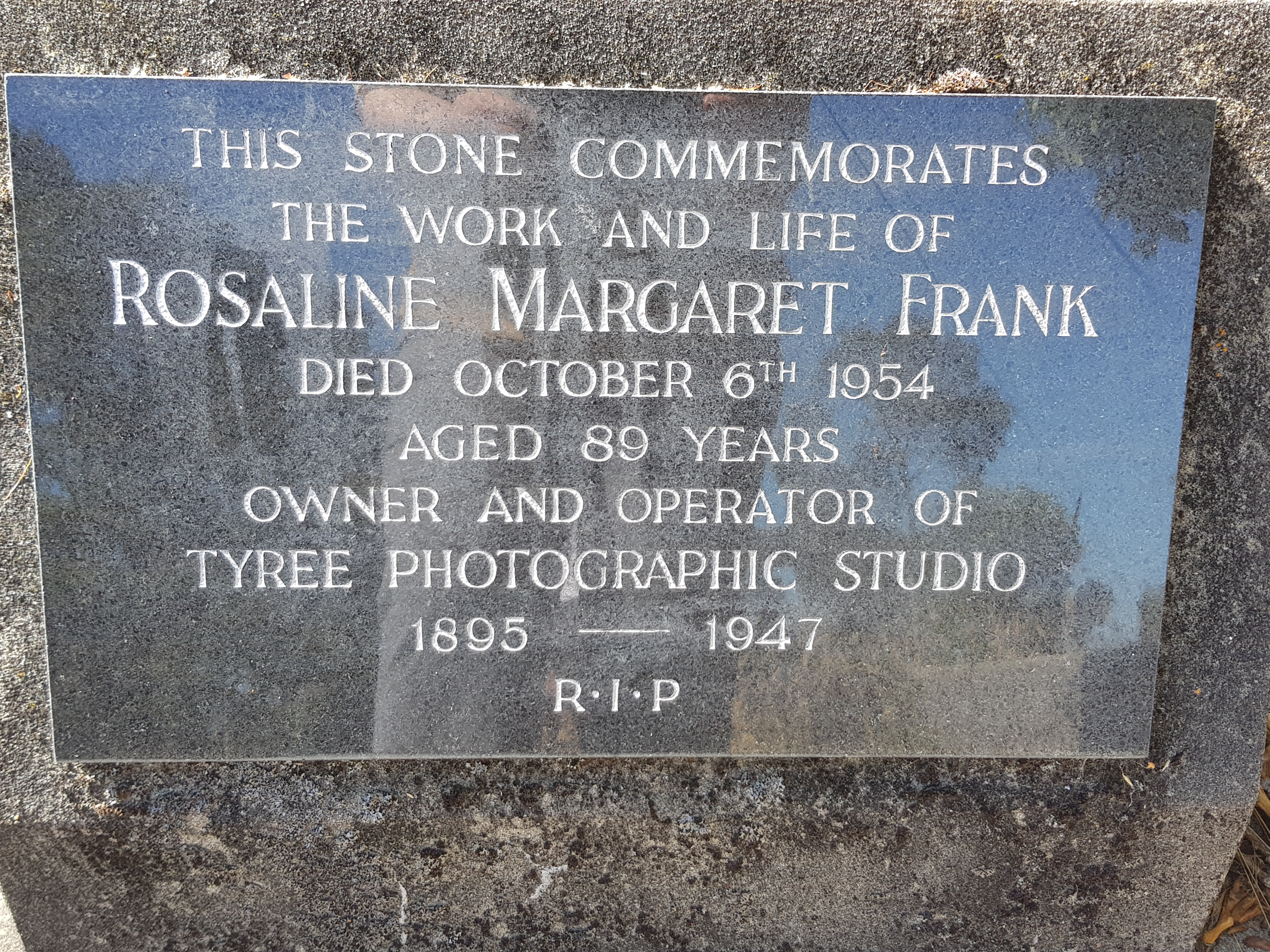
Rose Frank’s gravestone at the Wakapuaka Cemetery, Nelson in 2019

She died in Nelson in 1954 and was buried in Wakapuaka Cemetery.

Her legacy was a collection of about 200,000 glass-plate negatives, dating from the early days of settlement. It was based on the work of the Tyree brothers but incorporated negatives by other photographers, including herself. The collection now resides in the Nelson Provincial Museum.
