= Marriage à-la-mode =

Marriage à-la-mode may refer to:

- Marriage à la mode (play), a 1673 Restoration comedy by John Dryden
- "Marriage à-la-mode" (Hogarth), a series of 18th-century paintings by William Hogarth
- "Marriage à la Mode" (short story), a 1921 short story by Katherine Mansfield
