= Bagele Chilisa =

Botswana post-colonial scholar

- Born: Nshakazhogwe, Botswana
- Education: Master of Arts, University of Pittsburgh PhD, University of Pittsburgh
- Occupation: Professor at University of Botswana
- Spouse: Ernest Chilisa
- Parent(s): Motlalepul and Zwambele Kenosi

Bagele Chilisa is a Botswana post-colonial scholar who has written and spoken extensively about indigenous research and evaluation methodologies. She is a full professor at the University of Botswana, where she teaches courses on social science research methods and evaluation research to undergraduate and graduate students. Chilisa has served as an evaluator on multiple global projects, and is considered to be an important "African thought leader." Chilisa identifies as a member of the Bantu people of Africa.

== Biography ==
Chilisa was born and raised in the small village of Nshakazhogwe in Botswana. Her parents, Motlalepul and Zwambele Kenosi, were subsistence farmers. Her parents, and her grandmother, Ponya Kenosi, passed oral literature to her as a child, stimulating her lifelong interest in indigenous knowledge systems. In her book, Indigenous Research Methodologies (2012), Chilisa states:

I belong to the Bantu people of Africa, who live a communal life based on a connectedness that stretches from birth to death, continues beyond death, and extends to the living and the nonliving. I am known and communicate in relational terms that connect me to all my relations, living and the nonliving. It is common for people to refer to each other using totems as well as relational terms such as uncle, aunt, brother, and so on. For instance, my totem is a crocodile, and depending on who is talking to me and on what occasion, I can be referred to using my totem.

=== Education ===
Chilisa credits her father with teaching her the alphabet before she began attending school. Because her family lived near a village granary, she also learned to count before she began formal schooling. She attended primary and secondary school in Botswana. From the University of Pittsburgh, Chilisa earned her Master of Arts degree in Research Design, Measurement and Statistics, and her Ed.D in Policy Planning and Evaluation.

=== Career ===
Chilisa is a professor at the University of Botswana, housed in the Post Graduate Research and Evaluation Programme. She teaches courses in research methods and evaluation, and policy design. She teaches both graduate and undergraduate students at the University of Botswana.

Chilisa is a scholar of indigenous research methods, having published books and journal articles on the topic and spoken at national and international conferences. Her research focuses on communities in Botswana and other regions in southern Africa, but application of her ideas about indigenous research methods are worldwide. She is hailed as an "African thought leader driving the concept of African-rooted evaluation." In the preface to her seminal text, Indigenous Research Methodologies, Chilisa credits her father with instilling within her the "ways in which indigenous practices and values on connectedness and relational ways of knowing of the colonized Other could be valorized in research."

At the University of Botswana, Chilisa has an extensive record of service. She was a member of the board for the University of Botswana Centre for Scientific Research and Indigenous Knowledge and Innovations, as well as serving on the board of the University of Botswana Research Ethics Committee.

Chilisa has served non-governmental organizations (NGOs) as an evaluator for international projects including UNESCO, United Nations Development Programme (UNDP), the World Bank, the International Labour Organisation, and the United Nations Children's Fund. Chilisa has received multiple grants from international organizations to do research, including grants from the World Bank, the National Institute of Health (USA), and UNICEF. In 2018, Chilisa was appointed to serve on the United Nations Development Programme (UNDP) Evaluation Advisory Panel (EAP).

She co-founded the Botswana, Lesotho, Swaziland and Namibia Research Association, was the president of the Botswana Educational Research Association, and edited the Botswana Educational Research Journal.

== Published works ==
- Gaotlhobogwe, Michael; Thenjiwe Emily Major; Setlhomo Koloi-Keakitse, and Bagele Chilsa. (2018). "conceptualizing evaluation in African contexts." New Directions for Evaluation, no. 159: 47–62. DOI: 10.1002/ev.20332
- Brannelly, Tula, Rosalind Edwards, Melanie Nind, Helen Kara, Umut Erel, Helen Moewaka Barnes, Bagele Chilisa, and Amohia Boulton. (2017). "Reflective commentaries," Qualitative Research 17, no. 3: 351–355. doi:10.1177/146879411769891
- Chilisa, Bagele. (2017). "Decolonising transdisciplinary research approaches: an African perspective for enhancing knowledge integration in sustainability science." Sustainability Science, (5), 813. doi:10.1007/s11625-017-0461-1
- Chilisa, Bagele, Thenjiwe Emily Major, and Kelne Khudu-Petersen. (2017). "Community engagement with a postcolonial, African-based relational paradigm." Qualitative Research, 17, no. 3: 326–339. doi:10.1177/1468794117696176
- Chilisa, Bagele, Irene Mohiemang, Kolentino Nyamadzapasi Mpeta, Tumane Malinga, Poloko Ntshwarang, Bramwell Walela Koyabe, and G. Anita Heeren. (2016). "Contextualized theory-based predictors of intention to practice monogamy among adolescents in Botswana junior secondary schools: Results of focus group sessions and a cross-sectional study." Journal Of Human Behavior In The Social Environment, 26, no. 6: 533–540. doi:10.1080/10911359.2015.1114820
