= Cecil Manson =

New Zealand writer (1896–1987)

- Born: Cecil Murray Manson; 20 January 1896; London, England
- Died: 13 June 1987 (aged 91); Wellington, New Zealand
- Occupations: Writer; journalist; broadcaster; photographer; artist; soldier
- Spouse: Cecilia Evelyn Drummond (m. 1939)

Cecil Murray Manson (20 January 1896 – 13 June 1987) was a New Zealand writer, journalist, broadcaster, photographer, artist and soldier. Born in England, Manson studied art in European institutions and served as a soldier in both world wars. He moved to New Zealand with his wife Celia Manson in 1947, and together they co-authored a number of historical books, including children's books. They also helped found the Katherine Mansfield Menton Fellowship.

== Life and career ==
Manson was born in London, England, on 20 January 1896. He was the youngest son of Frederick William Manson and his wife, both based in Wimbledon. He was educated at Repton School, and studied art at the Grosvenor School of Modern Art, the Metropolitan School of Art, and the Académie Julian.

He served in both World War I and World War II, first with the 4th Battalion of the Queen's Royal Regiment. During the Gallipoli campaign in 1914 he met New Zealanders and decided he would like to move to New Zealand. After that campaign he moved to the Royal Flying Corps, where his son later said he survived nine crashes. He worked in insurance and journalism between the wars. In 1939 he married New Zealander Celia Manson in France. Their son Hugo was born in London in 1941 and later became a freelance journalist.

At the time World War II broke out, Manson was in his mid-forties, and his military service involved working in military intelligence at Bletchley Park. Until the mid-1970s he told people he had worked in airforce administration due to security restrictions. Manson and his wife moved to New Zealand in 1947, where together they co-wrote over 12 books about New Zealand history, including children's books. Manson also worked as an artist and photographer. In 1947 he purchased the Tyree Studio in Nelson, which he renamed to Manson's Studio. He exhibited his artwork at the New Zealand Academy of Fine Arts regularly between 1961 and 1979. In 1962 his work was exhibited as part of the Hay's Ltd Art Competition.

In 1967 Cecil and Celia visited Menton in France, and subsequently founded the Katherine Mansfield Menton Fellowship together with Sheilah Winn.

In 1981 he published a memoir of the first 34 years of his life, A World Away, through Pigeon Press. It was published simultaneously with his wife's historical work, The Widow of Thorndon Quay, and a review in The Press said the works were both "excellently written in their respective genres as would be expected of writers of their experience and calibre". In February 1987 a retrospective exhibition of his works was held by the Molesworth Gallery in Wellington. He died on 13 June 1987, aged 91, four months before the death of his wife.

== Selected works ==
Works by Manson and his wife Celia include:

- Tides of Hokianga (Wingfield Press, 1956)
- Doctor Agnes Bennett (Whitcombe & Tombs, 1960, also published in London by Michael Joseph)
- Curtain-raiser to a Colony (Whitcombe & Tombs, 1962)
- The Lonely One (Whitcombe & Tombs, 1963, also published in New York by Roy Publishers and in London by Epworth Press) (children's book)
- Pioneer Parade (A.H. & A.W. Reed, 1966)
- The Adventures of Johnny van Bart (Whitcombe & Tombs, 1965, also published in New York by Roy Publishers and in London by Epworth Press) (children's book)
- I Take Up My Pen: An Early Colonial Scrapbook (Pigeon Press, 1972)
- The Affair of the Wellington Brig: A True and Terrible Story (Millwood Press, 1978)

Manson separately authored:

- A World Away (Pigeon Press, 1981)
