= Helen Moewaka Barnes =

New Zealand academic

Helen Moewaka Barnes FRSNZ
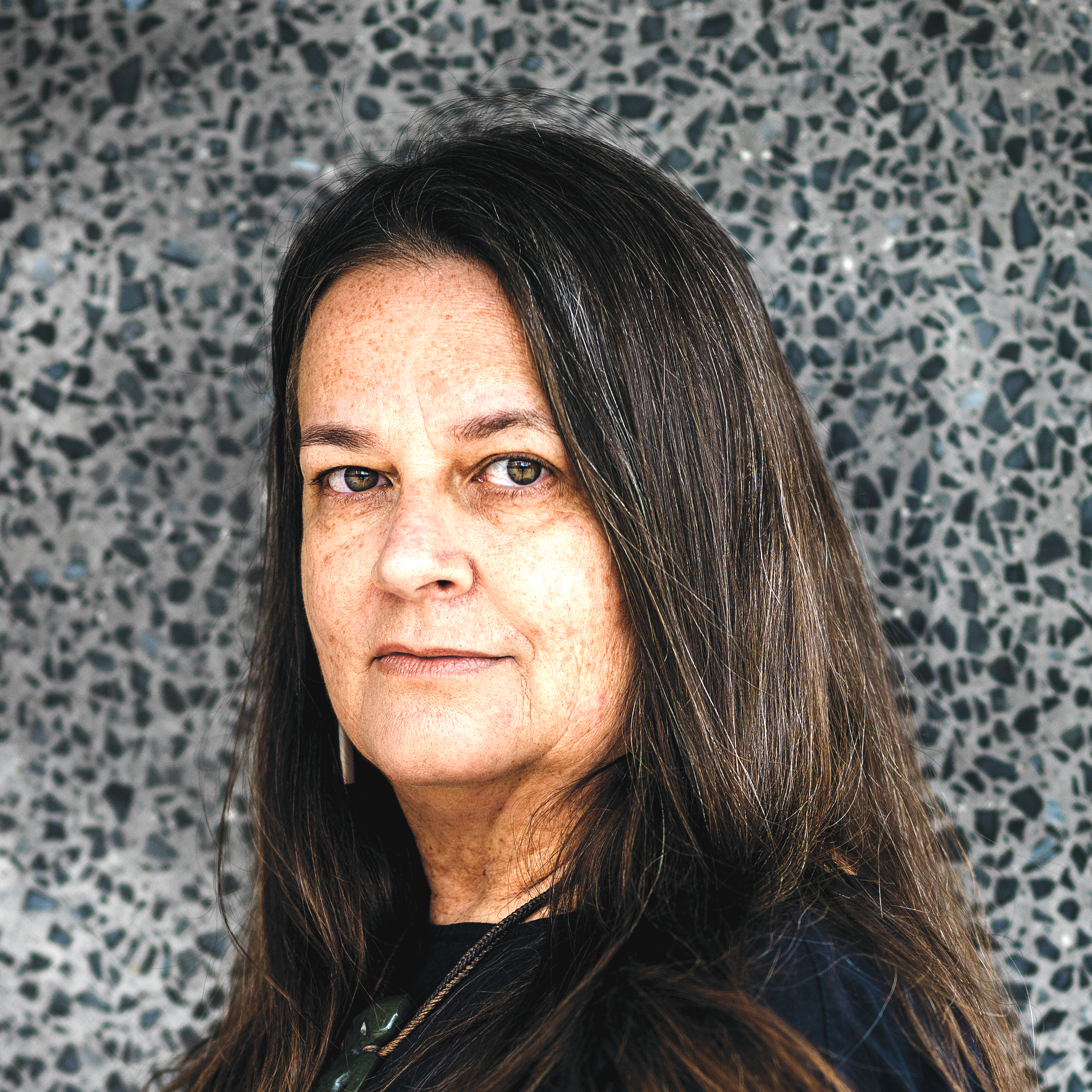
- Education: Massey University
- Scientific career
- Workplaces: Massey University
- Thesis: Arguing for the spirit in the language of the mind : a Māori practitioner's view of research and science (2008)

Helen Moewaka Barnes FRSNZ is a New Zealand academic. She is Māori, of Te Kapotai (Ngāpuhi) and Ngapuhi-nui-tonu descent, and is currently a full professor at Massey University. In 2021 she was elected as a Fellow of the Royal Society Te Apārangi.

== Academic career ==
After a 2008 PhD thesis titled Arguing for the spirit in the language of the mind: a Māori practitioner's view of research and science, Moewaka Barnes joined Massey University staff, becoming a full professor in 2013.

In 2010, 2011, 2012 and 2013, she received four separate grants from the Health Research Council, and a 2012 Marsden Fund award (funding for 2013–17).

Moewaka Barnes is part of the New Zealand Arrestee Drug Use Monitoring project, which surveys arrestees in the criminal justice system to compile statistics on drug use.

Moewaka Barnes' work looks at health from a kaupapa Māori perspective.

== Awards ==
In March 2021, Helen Moewaka Barnes was elected as a Fellow of the Royal Society Te Apārangi, recognising her "significant international impact in the field of Indigenous peoples' health and wellbeing".

== Selected works ==
- Helen Moewaka Barnes (1 March 2000). "Kaupapa maori: explaining the ordinary" (PDF). Pacific health dialog : a publication of the Pacific Basin Officers Training Program and the Fiji School of Medicine. 7 (1): 13–16. ISSN 1015-7867. PMID 11709875. Wikidata Q34440307.
- Helen Moewaka Barnes (2000). "Collaboration in community action: a successful partnership between indigenous communities and researchers." Health Promotion International. 15 (1): 17–25.
- Tim McCreanor; Alison Greenaway; Helen Moewaka Barnes; Suaree Borell; Amanda Gregory (2005). "Youth identity formation and contemporary alcohol marketing." Critical Public Health. 15 (3): 251–262.
- Tim McCreanor; Helen Moewaka Barnes; Mandi Gregory; Hector Kaiwai; Suaree Borell (January 2005). "Consuming identities: Alcohol marketing and the commodification of youth experience". Addiction Research & Theory. 13 (6): 579–590. doi:10.1080/16066350500338500. ISSN 1606-6359. Wikidata Q58089165.
- Tim McCreanor; Antonia Lyons; Christine Griffin; Ian Goodwin; Helen Moewaka Barnes; Fiona Hutton (March 2013). "Youth drinking cultures, social networking and alcohol marketing: implications for public health". Critical Public Health. 23 (1): 110–120. doi:10.1080/09581596.2012.748883. ISSN 0958-1596. Wikidata Q61994269.
