= The Garden Party (short story collection) =

1922 collection of short stories by Katherine Mansfield

The Garden Party and Other Stories
- First edition (publ. Constable)
- Author: Katherine Mansfield
- Language: English
- Publication date: 1922

The Garden Party and Other Stories is a 1922 collection of short stories by the writer Katherine Mansfield.

== Stories ==
1. "At the Bay"
2. "The Garden Party"
3. "The Daughters of the Late Colonel"
4. "Mr and Mrs Dove"
5. "The Young Girl"
6. "Life of Ma Parker"
7. "Marriage à la Mode"
8. "The Voyage"
9. "Miss Brill"
10. "Her First Ball"
11. "The Singing Lesson"
12. "The Stranger"
13. "Bank Holiday"
14. "An Ideal Family"
15. "The Lady's Maid"
