= International Society of Critical Health Psychology =

Membership association

- Formation: 2001
- Chair: Bridgette Rickett
- Vice-Chair: Brett Scholz
- Website: ischp.net

The International Society of Critical Health Psychology (ISCHP) is a society devoted to debate about critical ideas within health psychology and developing new ways of health psychology practice. Critical Health Psychology is concerned with analysis of ways in which health, illness and health care are shaped by social, economic, and political issues. To these ends, ISCHP's members commonly make use of qualitative methods and participatory research methods to address social, political and cultural issues within health psychology.

== Conferences ==
The Society organizes a biennial conference. These conferences have been held in: St. John's, Newfoundland, Canada (1999); Birmingham, UK (2001); Auckland, New Zealand (2003); Sheffield, UK (2005); Boston, USA (2007); Lausanne, Switzerland (2009); Adelaide, Australia (2011); Bradford, UK (2013); Grahamstown, South Africa (2015); Loughborough, UK (2017); Bratislava, Slovakia (2019); Wellington, Aotearoa New Zealand (2021); and Rancagua, Chile (2023). The most recent conference was held in July 2025 in Galway, Ireland . The next ISCHP biennial conference will be held at the University of Szeged in Szeged, Hungary in early July 2027.

== Membership ==
ISCHP welcomes membership from anyone who is aligned with its aims, regardless of disciplinary affiliation. There is no membership fee. Detail on how to join can be found at ischp.net/subscribe. ISCHP has an international membership from all fields of psychology and other disciplines. As of 2023 the society has approximately 1050 members in over 40 countries (see ischp.net).

== History ==
In July 1999, the First International Conference on Critical and Qualitative Approaches to Health Psychology was held in St. John's, Newfoundland, Canada, organized by Michael Murray; over 120 critical health psychologists from 20 countries and every continent on the globe attended the conference. It was agreed that there was a need to establish a network to connect those in health psychology throughout the world who were interested in developing a more critical approach to the subject.

In August 2001, the Second International Conference was held in Birmingham, UK. The International Society of Critical Health Psychology was established at this conference. The founding committee members included Kerry Chamberlain, Antonia Lyons, David Marks, Michael Murray and Christine Stephens.

== Bibliography ==
- Catriona I. Macleod, Jacqueline Marx, Phindezwa Mnyaka & Gareth J. Treharne (Eds.) (2018). The Palgrave handbook of ethics in critical research. London: Palgrave-MacMillan.
- Antonia C. Lyons & Kerry Chamberlain (2006). Health psychology: A critical introduction. Cambridge: Cambridge University Press.
- Michael Murray (Ed.) (2014). Critical health psychology (2nd edn.). London: Palgrave Macmillan.
- David F Marks, Michael Murray and Emee Estacio (2020). Health psychology. Theory, research & practice (6th end.). London: Sage Publishing.
