= Margaret Scott (New Zealand author) =

New Zealand author and Katherine Mansfield scholar (1928–2014)

- Born: Margaret Allan Bennett; 27 January 1928; Te Aroha, New Zealand
- Died: 4 December 2014 (aged 86); Dunedin, New Zealand
- Education: BA, Victoria University of Wellington
- Occupations: Writer; editor; librarian
- Spouse: Harry Scott (m. 1950; died 1960)
- Children: 3
- Writing career
- Years active: 1967–2010
- Subjects: Katherine Mansfield; Charles Brasch
- Notable awards: Katherine Mansfield Menton Fellowship; 1971

Margaret Allan Scott (née Bennett; 27 January 1928 – 4 December 2014) was a New Zealand writer, editor and librarian. After her husband's early death in 1960, she trained as a librarian, and was appointed as the first manuscripts librarian at the Alexander Turnbull Library. She was the second recipient of the Katherine Mansfield Menton Fellowship in 1971.

Scott completed the transcription and editing of the notebooks of Katherine Mansfield, a task made difficult by Mansfield's eclectic handwriting. Her work led to the publication of five volumes of Mansfield's letters between 1984 and 2008, and two volumes of Mansfield's notebooks in 1997. In 2001 she published her memoir. She was a friend of many literary New Zealanders, including Charles Brasch and Denis Glover, and completed the transcription of Brasch's journals before she died in 2014.

== Early life and career ==
Scott was born in Te Aroha and grew up in Christchurch. She attended Christchurch Girls' High School and graduated from the University of Canterbury with a Bachelor of Arts in English.

Scott worked in Christchurch as a vocational guidance counsellor before her marriage to Harry Scott (university don, writer and mountaineer) in 1950. It was through her husband that Scott met Charles Brasch in 1949. Scott and her husband spent the first half of their married life in Canada, where he did post-doctoral work, but returned to New Zealand in 1957, where he was appointed head of the new psychology department at the University of Auckland. He and a friend were killed in a climbing accident on Aoraki / Mt Cook on 1 February 1960. Scott was at that time pregnant with their third child, and left desolate by his death. His body was never recovered. In 1961, she wrote an article titled "Widowhood, the Challenge" under the pseudonym Marion Palmer, published in the New Zealand Family Doctor.

After her husband's death, in 1966, Scott moved to Wellington to train as a librarian. Charles Brasch was one of her supporting references, and during her studies she and her children stayed at the house of another New Zealand literary icon, James K. Baxter, while he was living in Dunedin for the Robert Burns Fellowship. Her first appointment was as the first manuscripts librarian at the Alexander Turnbull Library. She held the position from 1967 to 1973.

== Literary career ==
Scott had been interested in the writings of Katherine Mansfield since her final year of high school, when her teacher read the class one of Mansfield's short stories, "The Doll's House". In her 2001 memoir, Recollecting Mansfield, Scott described being offered a job at the Turnbull Library as "an extraordinary gift ... And then to discover that I now had responsibility for the care of masses of Mansfield manuscripts, many of which were nearly illegible and some of which had never been read since they were written, took my breath away".

Scott was one of the few people able to read Mansfield's famously illegible writing. In 1967, while working at the Turnbull Library, she embarked on a project to transcribe and edit Mansfield's letters and journals. Dan Davin, the Academic Editor at the Oxford University Press, had been seeking a New Zealand writer (preferably female) to take on this project, and Scott had been recommended by her friend Eric McCormick, another New Zealand writer.

Towards the end of 1970, Scott heard about a new fellowship being advertised, to enable a New Zealand writer to go to Menton, France and to work in a room in the Villa Isola Bella where Mansfield herself had stayed and worked. Scott applied for the fellowship and was the second recipient of the Katherine Mansfield Menton Fellowship, now one of New Zealand's foremost literary awards. The award enabled her to spend eight to ten months at Menton transcribing Mansfield's letters. She also took the opportunity to travel around Europe with her friend, the poet Lauris Edmond, at this time, and was able to meet and interview many people associated with Mansfield. In 1979 she was awarded a NZ$7,000 writers' bursary from Alex Harvey Industries to enable her to complete her work on the letters, begun 12 years previously. In the same year, she located a long-lost early novel draft by Mansfield, which the Turnbull Library had been trying to locate for over 20 years.

Her work on the transcription of Mansfield's letters, together with her co-editor Vincent O'Sullivan who joined the project in 1977, led to the publication of a five-volume edition of The Collected Letters of Katherine Mansfield by the Oxford University Press. The extensive nature of the work meant that it took over two decades, with the five volumes published between 1984 and 2008.

The first volume covered Mansfield's life from her teens to her late 20s, and was launched at the Turnbull Library in November 1984 with Mansfield's cousin Lulu McIntosh in attendance as special guest. At that time it was expected that there would be four volumes in total. In 1985, Perry Meisel reviewed the first volume for the New York Times, writing: "The self-portrait [of Mansfield] that emerges in the first of four projected volumes of her Collected Letters is, not surprisingly, a luminous and affecting one." Local newspaper The Press noted that the work had received "the highest praise in Britain", with The New Statesman and The Standard both praising the quality of the collection. The newspaper's own review called the publication "a long-awaited event" and described the editing of Scott and O'Sullivan as "splendid"; "the letters are transcribed exactly as Mansfield wrote them and the annotation is comprehensive". The second volume was published in 1987, covering early 1918 to late 1919 and largely featured Mansfield's letters to Murray after being diagnosed with tuberculosis. The Press records that her letters make "compelling reading" and that Scott and O'Sullivan "have presented us with the most comprehensive, carefully annotated collection that we are likely to see".

In 1989 she received the New Zealand National Library Research Fellowship, worth NZ$35,000, to transcribe, annotate and Katherine Mansfield's notebooks with the assistance of Gillian Boddy. In her 2001 memoir, Scott described this work as being similar to "solving a highly cryptic crossword puzzle". Mansfield's handwriting was not only "idiosyncratic and mercurial, it was also hurried and rough", and other transcribers such as her widower John Middleton Murry had made mistakes that had lost the significance of what Mansfield had written. Furthermore, Murry's selective approach to Mansfield's notebooks had meant that many of them had not been published and were inaccessible.

The Katherine Mansfield Notebooks were published firstly in two volumes by Lincoln University Press in 1997, and subsequently in a single complete edition by the University of Minnesota Press in 2002. Critical reaction was positive: the New York Times described her work as "meticulously compiled", while Lorna Sage writing in the London Review of Books commented that Scott's "long toil involved in deciphering [Mansfield's] unreliable handwriting and arcane order must suggest a labour of love". The Times Literary Supplement wrote: "It is only now, with the publication of Margaret Scott’s complete and unselective transcription of the material bequeathed to Murry, that we can really see Mansfield, off her guard and unexpurgated, for the first time. ... Mansfield's notebooks are remarkable, touched by a sense of the underlying pathos of things, two parts tragedy and two parts comedy."

== Later years and death ==
In 2001, Scott published her memoir, Recollecting Mansfield. Anna Jackson, reviewing the book for the Waikato Times, called it a "beautifully written account", and said "by the time you finish reading her memoir it is clear that you would have wanted to read the story of her life whatever direction it had taken, whether it had included Mansfield or not". The Southland Times called it "an exquisite book" by a "talented female New Zealand writer ... who gives unexpected insights into the life and talent of Katherine Mansfield". The reviewer praised Scott, highlighting: "Her determination, talent and enthusiasm; the struggle she had as a sole parent; the many ways she coped with the financial hardship and the loneliness of life after her husband's untimely death; and her ability to make and keep wonderful and supportive friends".

Scott was lifelong friends with writer Charles Brasch, and they had a brief intimate relationship after the death of her husband. Brasch wrote one of his best-known poems, "Winter Anenomes", after Scott presented him with some flowers shortly before he died. In 2007, Scott edited and wrote the introduction to Charles Brasch in Egypt, being Brasch's account of his time in Egypt.

After Brasch's death in 1973, his journals were deposited in the Hocken Library with a thirty-year embargo on publication. In 2003, the journals became available to view, and Scott began transcribing and editing the journals for publication. She became ill before she could complete the task, but had finished transcribing all his journals. The editing was completed by Peter Simpson and the journals were published in a three volume series between 2013 and 2018.

Scott died on 4 December 2014. After her death, New Zealand writer C. K. Stead (who received the Katherine Mansfield Menton Fellowship the year after Scott, in 1972) wrote:

I was always aware of, and often in touch with, Margaret as a major figure in the field, someone whose intelligence I admired, and whom I thought of always as one who could be 'temperamental', but generous, sensitive, herself a stylist of refinement, an entirely appropriate person to be dealing with [Mansfield].

== Selected works ==
- The Collected Letters of Katherine Mansfield (5 volumes, 1984–2008), co-editor with Vincent O'Sullivan
- The Katherine Mansfield Notebooks (1997), editor
- Recollecting Mansfield (2001), author
- Charles Brasch in Egypt (2007), editor
