= Mr and Mrs Dove =

1921 short story by Katherine Mansfield

"Mr and Mrs Dove" is a 1921 short story by Katherine Mansfield. It was first published in The Sphere on 13 August 1921, and later reprinted in The Garden Party and Other Stories.

== Plot summary ==
Reginald is returning to Rhodesia the next day; it is his last day in England. Again he thinks of Anne; then he goes to Colonel Proctor's to say goodbye, and he is greeted by Anne, her parents being away. On seeing him she laughs, then he tells her he is leaving. They both look at her pet doves. She remarks how "Mr. Dove" is always running after "Mrs Dove". Reginald asks her if she likes him, and she says she cannot marry him. He's unhappy at the rejection, and tries to depart. She asks why he's upset, but he persists in leaving. As he's walking away, she calls him again, calling him "Mr. Dove", and he goes back to her.

== Characters ==
- Reginald, the young man; he works on a fruit farm in Rhodesia. He is wan-looking because of his job.
- Anne, the coveted girl. She is Colonel Proctor's daughter, and she lives in England with her parents.
- Colonel Proctor, Anne's father.
- The Mater, Reginald's mother.
- Uncle Alick, deceased.
- the mother's widowed mother, who lives in England.

== Major themes ==
- Love
- Anthropomorphism
- Courtship

== Literary significance ==
The text is written in the modernist mode, without a set structure, and with many shifts in the narrative.
