= Celia Manson =

New Zealand writer (1908–1987)

Celia Manson MBE
- Born: Cecilia Evelyn Drummond; 24 August 1908; Carterton, New Zealand
- Died: 28 October 1987 (aged 79)
- Occupations: Writer; journalist; broadcaster
- Spouse: Cecil Murray Manson (m. 1939; died 1987)
- Relatives: Norah Burnard (sister)

Cecilia Evelyn Manson MBE (née Drummond; 24 August 1908 – 28 October 1987), known as Celia Manson, was a New Zealand writer, journalist and broadcaster. Many of her works were co-written with her husband Cecil Manson, and together they also laid the foundations for the Katherine Mansfield Menton Fellowship.

== Life and career ==
Manson was born in Carterton on 24 August 1908. She was one of ten children of Agnes Telford and her husband, Robert Drummond, a teacher; the journal editor Norah Burnard was her older sister. Manson attended Wairarapa College and subsequently Victoria University College. After university she travelled to the United Kingdom, where she worked as a freelance journalist for the BBC, including narrating a television series about three generations of a New Zealand family.

In 1939 she married Cecil Manson, an English soldier, in France. Their son Hugo was born in London in 1941. They went on to co-write several books together about New Zealand history, including children's books, and beginning with Tides of Hokianga in 1956. For some years they published weekly historical essays in The Dominion; these were published in a collection called Curtain-raiser to a Colony in 1962. They moved back to New Zealand after the end of the war, with Manson recording a programme for Wellington radio about her impressions on her return. In 1949 her book Willow's Point, an adventure story for children set in New Zealand, was published by the Museum Press in London, under the name C. Drummond Manson; her publisher anticipated that boys would not want to read a book written by a woman.

Together with her husband and Sheilah Winn she initiated the Katherine Mansfield Menton Fellowship. In 1967 Cecil and Celia visited the Villa Isola Bella where Mansfield wrote some of her best-known short stories, and discovered that a room on the lower level where she worked was derelict and not in use. Together with Winn, they decided to set up a fellowship for New Zealand authors, and formed a committee in Wellington to raise funds. Their vision was "to give a selected New Zealand writer a period of leisure to write or study ... [in] a different and more ancient culture, and thereby to see [their] own remote country in a better perspective".

In 1960 she joined the New Zealand Women Writers' Society, and in 1969 was appointed an honorary vice-president. She served as president of the society from 1970 to 1972. She was appointed a Member of the Order of the British Empire, for services to literature, in the 1977 New Year Honours. In 1978, a review of the Mansons' book The Affair of the Wellington Brig: A True and Terrible Tale by The Press described it as a "story superbly told with the skill expected of Cecil and Celia Manson".

Manson died on 28 October 1987, four months after the death of her husband.

== Selected works ==
Manson and her husband Cecil jointly co-authored:

- Tides of Hokianga (Wingfield Press, 1956)
- Doctor Agnes Bennett (Whitcombe & Tombs, 1960, also published in London by Michael Joseph)
- Curtain-raiser to a Colony (Whitcombe & Tombs, 1962)
- The Lonely One (Whitcombe & Tombs, 1963, also published in New York by Roy Publishers and in London by Epworth Press) (children's book)
- Pioneer Parade (A.H. & A.W. Reed, 1966)
- The Adventures of Johnny van Bart (Whitcombe & Tombs, 1965, also published in New York by Roy Publishers and in London by Epworth Press) (children's book)
- I Take Up My Pen: An Early Colonial Scrapbook (Pigeon Press, 1972)
- The Affair of the Wellington Brig: A True and Terrible Story (Millwood Press, 1978)

Manson separately authored:

- Willow's Point (Museum Press, 1949)
- Story of a New Zealand Family (Cape Catley, 1974)
- The Widow of Thorndon Quay (Pigeon Press, 1981)

== Bibliography ==
- France, Thelma; Quinn, Hestia; Henden, Roma; Ashforth, Isobelle, eds. (1984). History of the New Zealand Women Writers' Society, 1932–1982. Wellington: The New Zealand Women Writers' Society. ISBN 0-9597705-0-X.
- Hayward, Margaret; Cowley, Joy, eds. (1982). Women Writers of NZ 1932–1982, Jubilee History and Writings of the New Zealand Women Writers' Society. Wellington: Colonial Associates. ISBN 0-9597585-4-2.
