= Freddy Jones =

New Zealand saddler, photographer, amusement park owner and inventor

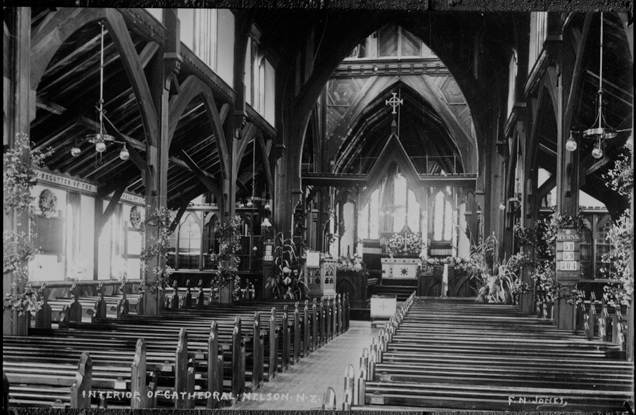
Sir George Grey Special Collections, Auckland Libraries, 4-6615

Frederick Nelson Jones (F N Jones) (4 May 1881 – 29 August 1962) was a New Zealand saddler, photographer, amusement park owner and inventor. Jones was most well known for his journalistic photographs, and he recorded important Nelson civic events from the early 1900s to 1935. He is also known as the creator of the popular attraction Pixietown, or Pixie Town, which toured internationally.

== Early life ==
Jones was born on 4 May 1881. His father, also named Frederick Nelson Jones, was a saddler. His mother's name was Emeline Sophia Jones. Once Jones had finished school he worked for his father as a saddler. In 1904, he sold 1, 500 prints from the three glass plate negatives he took of the burning of Nelson College. After this, his photography business flourished and he was able to buy land and start a studio. Jones was nicknamed "Pompy" and he was often seen on a three-legged ladder used to take photographs from above the crowds.

== Pixietown ==
Video of Pixietown as displayed in 2024. The Toitū Otago Settlers Museum owns around 13 scenes, and displays eight each year.

In 1921 Jones retired from photography to focus on his other endeavours such as his Magic Cave and Pixie Town creations. The Magic Cave and Pixietown consisted of a number of elaborate scenes with automated "pixies". The pixies were handcarved from wood, and animated through a series of hidden belts and pulleys. The scenes were displayed first in 1933, and were so popular they were soon touring in New Zealand and overseas and displayed at a number of department stores, including the DIC in Dunedin. When Pixietown visited Christchurch for the first time in 1949 for the New Zealand Industries Fair, nearly 28,000 people viewed it. At that time the display consisted of five scenes, including a mathematics schoolroom, a donkey causing a traffic jam, a music box and an organ-player, a boat-yard with a submarine, and a domestic wash-day. Each scene had approximately 100 pixie figures. The DIC acquired some scenes when the cost of touring made Pixietown uneconomic, and when the DIC closed in 1991 some of the displays were bought by the Otago Settlers Association. Since 2004 they have been displayed annually at Toitū Otago Settlers Museum at Christmas time.

== Personal life ==
In 1910 Jones married Ivy Florence Dougan. The two bore no children but opened an amusement park in Haven Road called Coney Park in 1921.

== Death ==
Jones died on 29 August 1962 at age 76. Approximately 5,000 photographic negatives are held by the Nelson Provincial Museum and a further 5,000 to 8,000 images are held at the Alexander Turnbull Library, Wellington. Jones is buried in the Wakapuaka Cemetery, Nelson.
