= Sue Wootton =

New Zealand poet

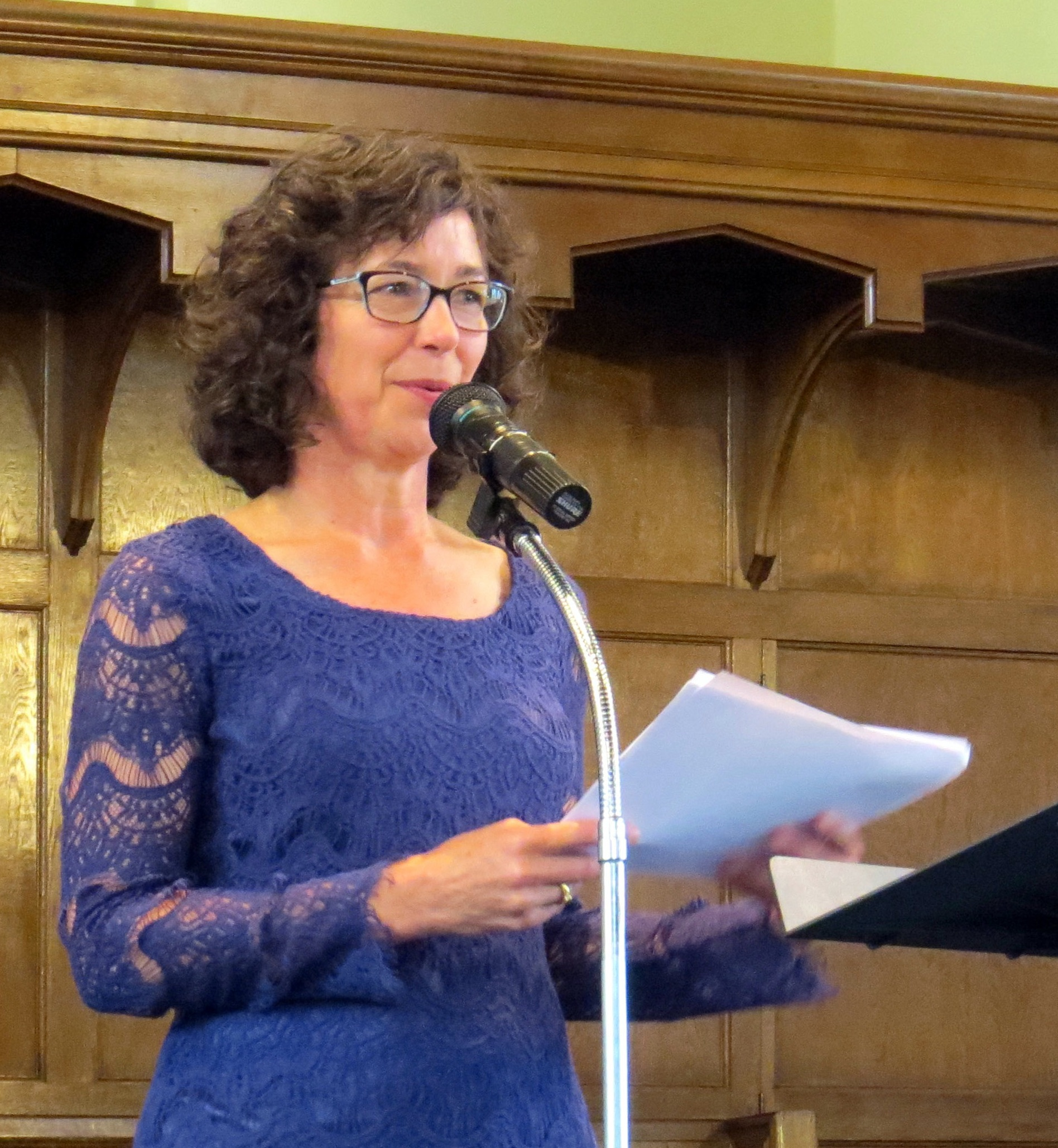
Wootton at a reading in Knox Church, Dunedin in March 2016

Sue Wootton (born 1961) is a New Zealand writer, specialising in poetry and short fiction.

== Early life and family ==
Wootton was born in Wellington in 1961, and spent much of her early life in Wanganui before moving to Dunedin, where she attended the University of Otago. She trained as a physiotherapist and worked in that field for twenty years. She has three children with her ex-husband, the lawyer and politician David Parker.

== Literary career ==
Wootton received a Bachelor of Arts degree in English literature in 2003, and published her first selection of poetry, Hourglass, in 2005. In 2008, Wootton was awarded the Robert Burns Fellowship by the University of Otago. She graduated from Massey University with a Master of Creative Writing in 2015 and completed her Doctor of Philosophy degree at the University of Otago in 2020. Her doctoral thesis discussed "how stories and poetry can contribute to a better understanding of what being well means."

Her works have appeared in numerous poetry anthologies and other publications, among them Under Flagstaff: An Anthology of Dunedin Poetry (University of Otago Press, 2004), Landfall, Swings and Roundabouts: Poems on Parenthood (Random House, 2008), and Poetry Pudding (Reed, 2007). Three short stories by Wootton appeared in the anthology The Happiest Music on Earth (Rosa Mira Books, 2013).

Strip, her first novel, was published by Mākaro Press in 2016. The novel was written during Wootton's masters study at Massey University. Strip was longlisted in the 2017 Ockham New Zealand Book Awards. Her fifth poetry collection, The Yield, was longlisted in the 2018 Ockham New Zealand Book Awards.

Wootton was the recipient of the 2018 NZSA Peter & Dianne Beatson Fellowship and the 2020 Katherine Mansfield Menton Fellowship. Previous awards she has won include the 2007 Inverawe Poetry Competition in Tasmania, the 2010 New Zealand Poetry Society International Poetry competition, and the 2013 Cancer Council Victoria Arts Awards poetry prize. Wootton was runner-up in the BNZ Katherine Mansfield short story awards in 2009 and 2010, and a finalist in the 2008 The Sunday Star-Times short story competition.

In 2021 she was named publisher at Otago University Press.

== Books ==
=== Poetry ===
- Hourglass (Steele Roberts, 2005)
- Magnetic South (Steele Roberts, 2008)
- By Birdlight (Steele Roberts, 2011)
- Out of Shape (Ampersand Duck, 2013)
- The Yield (Otago University Press, 2017)

=== Fiction ===
- Strip (Mākaro Press, 2016)

=== Short fiction ===
- The Happiest Music on Earth (Rosa Mira Books, 2013)
- Cloudcatcher (Steele Roberts, 2010)
