= Nicolette Fay Sheridan =

New Zealand nursing researcher

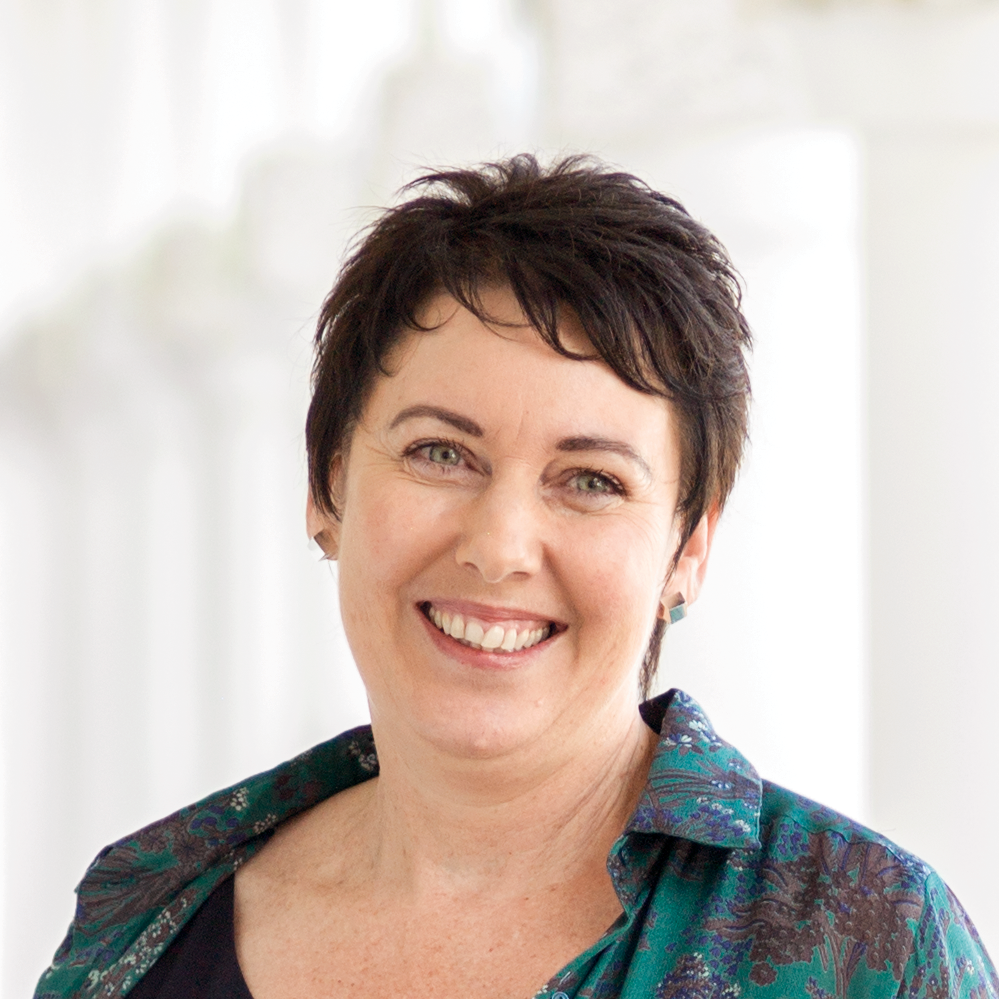
- Education: University of Auckland
- Scientific career
- Workplaces: Massey University
- Thesis: Mapping a new future: Primary Health Care Nursing in New Zealand (2005)

Nicolette Fay Sheridan is a New Zealand nursing academic of Ngāpuhi descent, and as of 2019 is a full professor at the Massey University.

== Academic career ==
After a 2005 PhD titled 'Mapping a new future: Primary Health Care Nursing in New Zealand' at the University of Auckland, Sheridan moved to the Massey University, rising to full professor.

== Selected works ==
- Sheridan, Nicolette F., Timothy W. Kenealy, Jacquie D. Kidd, Jacqueline IG Schmidt‐Busby, Jennifer E. Hand, Deborah L. Raphael, Ann M. McKillop, and Harold H. Rea. "Patients’ engagement in primary care: powerlessness and compounding jeopardy. A qualitative study." Health Expectations 18, no. 1 (2015): 32-43.
- Sheridan, Nicolette F., Timothy W. Kenealy, Martin J. Connolly, Faith Mahony, P. Alan Barber, Mary Anne Boyd, Peter Carswell et al. "Health equity in the New Zealand health care system: a national survey." International Journal for Equity in Health 10, no. 1 (2011): 45.
- Kenealy, Timothy W., Matthew JG Parsons, A. Paul B. Rouse, Robert N. Doughty, Nicolette F. Sheridan, Jennifer K. Harré Hindmarsh, Sarah C. Masson, and Harry H. Rea. "Telecare for diabetes, CHF or COPD: effect on quality of life, hospital use and costs. A randomised controlled trial and qualitative evaluation." PLOS ONE 10, no. 3 (2015): e0116188.
- Neuwelt, Pat, Don Matheson, Bruce Arroll, Anthony Dowell, Doone Winnard, Peter Crampton, Nicolette Fay Sheridan, and Jacqueline Cumming. "Putting population health into practice through primary health care." The New Zealand Medical Journal (Online) 122, no. 1290 (2009).
- Finlayson, Mary P., Nicolette F. Sheridan, Jacqueline M. Cumming, and Sandra Fowler. "The impact of funding changes on the implementation of primary health care policy." Primary health care research & development 13, no. 2 (2012): 120–129.
