= Russell Haley =

New Zealand poet, short story writer and novelist

- Born: 1934; Dewsbury, England
- Died: 4 July 2016 (aged 82); Whangārei, New Zealand
- Occupations: Poet; short story writer; novelist
- Spouse: Jean Haley
- Children: 2
- Awards: Katherine Mansfield Menton Fellowship (1987)

Russell Haley (1934 – 4 July 2016) was a New Zealand poet, short story writer and novelist. Born in Yorkshire, he and his wife emigrated to Australia in 1961 and then to New Zealand in 1966, where he lived the rest of his life. He began publishing plays while living in Australia and his writing career continued in New Zealand, where he published several collections of poetry and short stories, and two novels. His work was known for its surrealism and imagination, and he also wrote about his life and personal experiences of moving between countries. In 1987 he received the Katherine Mansfield Menton Fellowship.

== Early life and emigration ==
Although born in Dewsbury in Yorkshire, Haley lived most of his life in New Zealand, and considered himself a New Zealander. Haley served two years of National Service in the RAF and was stationed for some time in Iraq.

Haley and his wife emigrated to Australia in 1961 and then with their children to New Zealand in 1966. The move to New Zealand was prompted by a chance encounter with poet David Mitchell, from whom Haley learned about New Zealand's open entry policy to university after the age of 21. Haley completed his Master of Arts at the University of Auckland in 1970.

== Writing career ==
Haley's first published works were radio plays with ABC Australia, broadcast in the late 1960s, and he continued to write plays for the stage in New Zealand. His works included The Running European, which was staged at the Young Aucklanders in the Arts Festival in 1968 and published in the 1969 Arts Festival Literary Yearbook. In 1968, New Zealand composer Jack Body set Haley's poem "Turtle Time" to music. It was introduced by the NZBC at the International Rostrum of Composers at UNESCO, Paris, in 1969. This poem was described by newspaper The Press as drawing together "various experiences of death and the sinister nature of time". A performance which Haley himself attended was held by the Karlheinz Company in Auckland in 2016 not long before his death.

Haley's first book of poetry, The Walled Garden, was published in 1972. His second, On The Fault Line and Other Poems (1977) explored his experience of returning to his birthplace in Yorkshire. Peter Simpson described it as a "sequence of honest and well crafted poems, an unexpected development from a poet better known for the flash and dazzle of surrealistic word games". In 1979, he was awarded a $5,000 writers' bursary. In the same year, poet C. K. Stead jokingly referred to Haley in a sonnet as "probably / the best Yorkshire surrealist / writing in New Zealand".

In the 1970s and 1980s, Haley began writing short stories, publishing The Sauna Bath Mysteries and Other Stories in 1978, and Real Illusions in 1984. The Sauna Bath Mysteries was published with the aid of a grant from the New Zealand Literary Fund. A review by writer Heather McPherson described it as "presenting a soft-edged reality where fantasy and perception blur and time and space may shift arbitrarily"; she concluded that "originality and a kind of intelligence secure enough to tilt the universe make this book an imaginative interior trip". A review of Real Illusions by Owen Marshall noted Haley's work was "not interesting on a level of narrative action", but that Haley "has the necessary language skills" to make the work interesting and "sustains them through the majority of these stories". Overall, he concluded that Haley was "a strong, vivid, yet thoughtful writer". In 1985 he was appointed as literary fellow at the University of Auckland.

He published two further novels, The Settlement (1986) and Beside Myself (1990), and a biographical study of the painter Pat Hanly called Hanly: A New Zealand Artist (1989). He was awarded second prize in the non-fiction category for Hanly at the Goodman Fielder Wattie Book Awards. In reviewing The Settlement, Owen Marshall noted it had a similar theme to Haley's previous short stories about "the fallibility of the real"; although finding that the style of the novel was "not always convincing", he concluded that it "is a New Zealand novel of ideas which has relevance and provokes thought long after the final page is reached".

In 1987, Haley was the recipient of one of New Zealand's foremost literary awards, the Katherine Mansfield Menton Fellowship, which allowed him to live and write in Menton, France for the year. During this time he wrote The Transfer Station (1989), described by the Oxford Companion to New Zealand Literature as "a series of closely linked stories which fuse French and New Zealand elements in a futuristic scenario".

Haley's novels Tomorrow Tastes Better and The Spaces Between were published in 2001 and 2012 respectively. His last novel, Moonshine Eggs, was published in 2017 after his death.

== Works ==
=== Poetry ===
- The Walled Garden (1972)
- On the Fault Line (1977)

=== Short stories ===
- The Sauna Bath Mysteries (1978)
- Real Illusions (1984)
- The Transfer Station (1989)
- A Spider Web Season (also includes The Transfer Station) (2000)

=== Novels ===
- The Settlement (1986)
- Beside Myself (1990)
- All Done with Mirrors (1999)
- Tomorrow Tastes Better (2001)
- The Spaces Between (2012)
- Moonshine Eggs (2017) (published posthumously)

=== Other ===
- Hanly: A New Zealand Artist (1989) (non-fiction)
- The Penguin Book of Contemporary New Zealand Short Stories (1989) (editor, with Susan Davis)
