= Owen Leeming =

New Zealand poet, playwright and media producer

- Born: 1930 (age 95–96) Christchurch, New Zealand
- Occupation: Poet; playwright; media producer
- Notable works: "The Priests of Serrabone" (1962 poem); Venus is Setting (1972 collection)
- Notable awards: Katherine Mansfield Menton Fellowship; 1970
- Spouse: Mireille Leeming (m. 1989)

Owen Leeming (born 1930) is a New Zealand poet, playwright, radio presenter and television producer. While working in broadcasting in London and New Zealand in the 1950s and 1960s, he had short stories and poems published in various magazines and journals, and wrote stage and radio plays. In 1970, he was the first recipient of one of New Zealand's foremost literary awards, the Katherine Mansfield Menton Fellowship, after which he published his first collection of poetry.

Later in life, Leeming settled in France and became a translator. His second collection of poetry was published in 2018, over four decades after his first collection, followed by a collection of selected works in 2021.

== Early life and career ==
Leeming was born in Christchurch, New Zealand, and attended St Bede's College on a boarding scholarship. He studied French and music at the University of Canterbury, then named Canterbury College. During this time he won a Christchurch Civic Music Council competition with a choral music composition, and in 1953 he was the chairman of the Canterbury College Drama Society.

After university, Leeming went to France to study musical composition, having been granted a government bursary, but left after a year. He subsequently worked in broadcasting in London and New Zealand for a number of years. Notably, in 1961, Leeming interviewed Ted Hughes and Sylvia Plath for the BBC, in a radio broadcast entitled Two of a Kind: Poets in Partnership. In 1962, Leeming interviewed the three surviving sisters of New Zealand author Katherine Mansfield. The interview was recorded for the New Zealand Broadcasting Corporation archives.

== Literary career ==
Leeming's early poems and stories were published in various English journals, including The London Magazine and The Guinness Book of Poetry. In 1959, his short story "The Following Wind" was published in the New Zealand journal Landfall. During his time in London, he participated in poetry discussion group "The Group" along with fellow Antipodean expat Peter Porter. Leeming also wrote a number of plays for the stage and for radio. Leeming's most well-known poem, "The Priests of Serrabone", was published in Landfall in 1962. It was described by New Zealand writer James K. Baxter in 1971 as "masterly", and as "one of the documents to which I turn for reassurance in my private clumsy labours to undo the harm the Catholic Church does to her young".

Leeming was the first recipient of the Katherine Mansfield Menton Fellowship award in 1970. This award allowed Leeming to spend a year in Menton, France as a writer in residence at the Villa Isola Bella, where Katherine Mansfield lived from 1919 to 1920. Following his residency, Leeming's first collection of poems, Venus is Setting, was published in 1972 by Caxton Press. Its publication was supported by a grant from the New Zealand State Literary Fund. A review in newspaper The Press preferred Leeming's plays to his poetry, but nevertheless said that some of his poems "achieve a fluidity which reminds one of how well he can write". The review praised in particular "The Priests of Serrabone" and noted it "holds its intensity fairly well and adroitly uses a complex stanza".

After time in Africa and Asia as a Unesco consultant, Leeming settled in France and worked as an OECD translator. In 2014, two of his poems were published in journal Poetry New Zealand, forty years since his last poems were published in New Zealand. His experiences travelling back to New Zealand with his wife generated his second collection of poems, Through Your Eyes, published in 2018. In 2021, Latitudes: New and Selected Poems 1954–2020 was published, containing poems from both his collections as well as previously unpublished works. Victor Billot, reviewing the collection for Landfall, described some of the earlier unpublished works as "windows into a vanished world", and said his later poems "develop down strange and wonderful branches".

== Personal life ==
Leeming had a brief relationship in the 1960s with British television personality Jan Leeming. Although they never married, she took his name by deed poll and did not change it after their separation.

As of 2020, Leeming lived in Paris with his wife Mireille.
