= Kerry Chamberlain =

New Zealand psychology academic

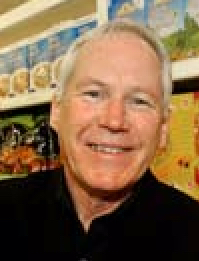
- Chamberlain in 2007
- Occupation: Professor
- Known for: Research into health and everyday life

Academic background
- Education: MA
- Alma mater: University of Canterbury

Academic work
- Doctoral students: Antonia Lyons
- Notable works: Qualitative Health Psychology: Theories and Methods, Existential Meaning: Optimizing Human Development Across the Life Span, Health Psychology: A Critical Introduction

Kerry Chamberlain is a Professor of Social and Health Psychology at Massey University, New Zealand. He is a critical health psychologist who has been prominent internationally in promoting qualitative research within health psychology. His main research interests include health in everyday life and understanding of disadvantage.

== Career ==
Chamberlain has an MA from University of Canterbury, New Zealand. Chamberlain has published extensively on qualitative research, health psychology and quality of life. His research interests include:

- food and health
- media and health
- the meanings of medication
- everyday illness

"He utilises mainly qualitative research methodologies in his research, predominantly critical discursive approaches, and innovative approaches, such as photo-elicitation, diaries, maps, and the use of material objects like personal possessions and photographs, to reveal the materiality and social practices of everyday life." He has received a Marsden grant to fund his research of the social meaning of medications.

Chamberlain was one of the founding members, and as of 2018 is the Communication Co-ordinator of the International Society of Critical Health Psychology. In 2011, he became a Fellow of the European Health Psychology Society. He "was awarded the fellowship in recognition of his research publications in health psychology, his work in establishing health psychology in New Zealand, his contributions to establishing and developing the International Society of Critical Health Psychology, and his support of the activities of the European Health Psychology Society." Chamberlain is the associate editor of the society's journal Psychology and Health.

== NZ Skeptics ==
Chamberlain was one of the seven founding members of NZ Skeptics. The organisation was founded on February 6, 1986, at University of Canterbury.
