= Miss Brill =

1920 short story by Katherine Mansfield

"Miss Brill" is a short story by Katherine Mansfield (1888–1923). It was first published in Athenaeum on 26 November 1920, and later reprinted in The Garden Party and Other Stories.

== Plot summary ==
Miss Brill is an English teacher living near the Public Gardens in a French town. The narrative follows her on a regular Sunday afternoon, which she spends walking about and sitting in the park.

The story opens with Miss Brill delighting in her decision to wear her fur. She notices that there are more park-goers than there were last Sunday, and that the band is more enthusiastic because the Season has commenced. Miss Brill observes facets of the lives around her, "listening as though she didn't listen, ...sitting in other people's lives just for a minute while they talked round her". She sees the world as a play: as though her surroundings are a set and she and her fellow park-goers actors. She imagines that the band's performance corresponds with and highlights the park's happenings. When the band strikes up a new song, Miss Brill envisions everyone in the park taking part in the song and singing. She begins to cry at the thought.

A young couple arrive and share Miss Brill's bench. Miss Brill believes they are nicely dressed and warmly pictures them as the "hero and heroine" of the play. However, she overhears the boy make a rude remark about Miss Brill being a "stupid old thing", and the girl agrees, "It's her fu-fur which is so funny."

On a typical Sunday, Miss Brill would stop by the bakery, but on this particular day, she goes straight home to a dark room. As she returns her fur to its box, Miss Brill "[thinks] she [hears] something crying".

== Analysis ==
=== Symbolism ===
- Fur—the fur's life parallels Miss Brill's: it is removed from its small, dark residence and brought into the open, only to be returned to its lonely box at the story's close. Miss Brill refers to the fur as a "rogue", an adventurer, though her own life is idle and lonely.
- Ermine toque—the once-fine fur's state of decay parallels the grayness of those sitting on the park benches and, as it turns out, that of Miss Brill herself.
- Orchestra—Miss Brill's emotions are reflected and echoed by the orchestra's performance.

=== Themes ===
- Loneliness
- Illusion versus reality
- Youth and age
- Rejection
- Isolation
- Alienation
- Denial

=== Literary significance ===
The text is written in the modernist mode, third-person limited point of view, without a set structure.
