= Tim McCreanor =

New Zealand-based public health researcher

Tim McCreanor is a New Zealand-based researcher and commentator in public health. Themes in his work include racial discrimination, the wellbeing and health of young people, and representations in various forms of media. McCreanor is widely published in books, academic articles and reports. Often McCreanors' work is about decolonisation which he writes about from a Pākehā (white New Zealanders) point of view.

McCreanor completed a PHD at the University of Auckland in 1995, the title is Pakeha discourses of Maori/Pakeha relations. He has worked at the University of Auckland and is a professor within the College of Health at the SHORE and Whariki Research Centre at Massey University. As a commentator McCreanor has been published in The Conversation, Newsroom and presenter at conferences Te Tiriti-based Futures and Anti-racism and The New Zealand Pschychological Society Annual Conference 2009. He was co-editor of the book New Zealand Identities: Departures and Destinations (2005) alongside Tracey McIntosh, James H Liu and Teresia Teaiwa.

== Publications ==
=== Selected chapters in books ===
- Moewaka Barnes, A., & McCreanor, T. (2023). “Feeding people's beliefs”: Mass media representations of Māori and criminality. In C. Cunneen, A. Deckert, A. Porter, J. Tauri, & R. Webb (Eds.), The Routledge International Handbook on Decolonizing Justice (pp. 22–32). London: Routledge.
- Goodwin, I., Lyons, A., Griffin, C., & McCreanor, T. (2014). Ending up online: Interrogating mediated youth drinking cultures. In B. Roberts & A. Bennett (Eds.), Mediated Youth Cultures: Palgrave Macmillan.
- Abel, S., McCreanor, T., & Moewaka Barnes, A. (2012). Reporting te Tiriti: Producing and performing the colonial society. In M. Hirst, V. Rupar & S. Phelan (Eds.), Scooped: The politics and power of journalism in Aotearoa New Zealand Auckland: AUT Media.

=== Selected journal articles ===
- Hill, S., Sarfati, D., Blakely, T., Robson, B., Purdie, G., Chen, J., Dennett, E, Cormack, D, Cunningham, R, Dew, K., McCreanor, T., & Kawachi, I. (2010). Survival disparities in Indigenous and non-Indigenous New Zealanders with colon cancer: the role of patient comorbidity, treatment and health service factors. Journal of Epidemiology and Community Health, 64. 117-123
- Suzanne Mavoa, Karen Witten, Tim McCreanor, David O'Sullivan (2012). GIS based destination accessibility via public transit and walking in Auckland, New Zealand. Journal of Transport Geography, 20(1), 15–22.
- McCreanor, Tim; Lyons, Antonia; Christine Griffin; Ian Goodwin; Barnes, Helen; Hutton, Fiona (2013). "Youth drinking cultures, social networking and alcohol marketing: implications for public health". Critical Public Health. 23 (1): 110–120. doi:10.1080/09581596.2012.748883. Wikidata Q61994269.
- Raymond Nairn, Ruth Desouza, Angela Barnes, Jenny Rankine, Belinda Borell, Tim Mccreanor (2014) "Nursing in media-saturated societies: implications for cultural safety in nursing practice in Aotearoa New Zealand" Journal of Research in Nursing 19(6):477-487 DOI:10.1177/1744987114546724
- Helen Moewaka Barnes, Tim McCreanor (2019). "Colonisation, hauora and whenua in Aotearoa" Journal of The Royal Society of New Zealand. online, doi: 10.1080/03036758.03032019.01668439.

== See more ==
Keynote to the NZPsS Conference 2009 "Challenging and countering anti-Māori discourse: Practices for decolonisation": link to PDF
