= Norah Burnard =

New Zealand school dental supervisor and journal editor

Norah Telford Burnard (née Drummond; 14 July 1902 – 27 February 1979) was a New Zealand school dental supervisor and journal editor.

Burnard was born in Clareville, Wairarapa, New Zealand on 14 July 1902, and was the older sister of writer Celia Manson. She was one of just 10 women in the 1920s to gain a certificate of proficiency in dental surgery, and worked as a dental supervisor until 1933, when she became the editor of the women's section of the New Zealand Dairy Exporter and Farm Home Journal.
