= Vincent O'Sullivan (New Zealand writer) =

New Zealand writer and academic (1937–2024)

Sir Vincent O'Sullivan KNZM
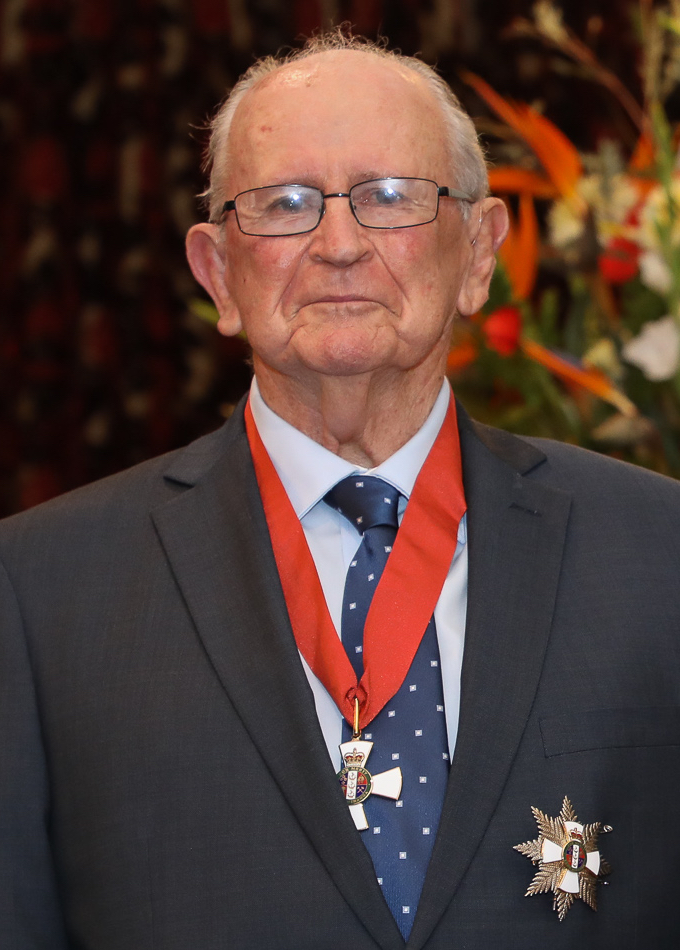
- O'Sullivan in 2022

9th New Zealand Poet Laureate
- In office 2013–2015
- Preceded by: Ian Wedde
- Succeeded by: C. K. Stead

Personal details
- Born: Vincent Gerard O'Sullivan; 28 September 1937 Auckland, New Zealand
- Died: 28 April 2024 (aged 86) Dunedin, New Zealand
- Children: 2
- Relatives: Dominic O'Sullivan (son)
- Education: University of Auckland; University of Oxford
- Occupation: Writer; academic

Sir Vincent Gerard O'Sullivan KNZM (28 September 1937 – 28 April 2024) was a New Zealand poet, short story writer, novelist, playwright, critic, editor, biographer, librettist, and academic. From 1988 to 2004 he was a professor of English literature at Victoria University of Wellington, and in 2013 he was appointed the New Zealand Poet Laureate.

== Background ==
Born in Auckland in 1937, O'Sullivan was the youngest of six children born to Timothy O'Sullivan (born in Tralee, Ireland) and Myra O'Sullivan (née McKean). He was educated at St Joseph's School in Grey Lynn, and Sacred Heart College, located in Ponsonby when he was there. He graduated from the University of Auckland with a Bachelor of Arts degree in 1959 and a Master of Arts with first-class honours the following year. He was awarded a Commonwealth Scholarship, and completed a Master of Letters (MLitt) degree at Lincoln College, Oxford in 1962.

O'Sullivan's first marriage was to Tui Rererangi Walsh, with whom he had two children; Deirdre and Dominic O'Sullivan. They separated in the 1970s. In 2018 he was living in Port Chalmers, Dunedin, with his wife Helen.

O'Sullivan died in Dunedin on 28 April 2024, at the age of 86. On his death, Fiona Kidman said that he was "right up there at the top" of great New Zealand writers, and someone who "helped to shape New Zealand literature" in its early years.

== Career ==
O'Sullivan lectured at Victoria University of Wellington (VUW) from 1963 to 1966, and the University of Waikato between 1968 and 1978. He served as literary editor of the NZ Listener from 1979 to 1980, and then between 1981 and 1987 won a series of writer's residencies and research fellowships in universities in Australia and New Zealand: VUW, University of Tasmania, Deakin University (Geelong), Flinders University in Adelaide, University of Western Australia, and University of Queensland. These were interrupted in 1983 by a year as resident playwright at Downstage Theatre, Wellington. In 1988 he returned to VUW, where he was professor of English literature until his retirement in 2004. His notable students included Majella Cullinane.

O'Sullivan's literary works include plays, novels and collections of short stories and poetry. His works often addressed themes of death, loss and betrayal. His first poetry collection was published in 1965 and he established his reputation as a poet in the late 1960s and 1970s. He went on to complete twenty further volumes of poetry over the course of his career; his final collection, Still Is, is scheduled to be published posthumously in June 2024.

In the late 1970s O'Sullivan began writing short stories and plays, with his first full-length stage play performed at the Downstage Theatre in 1983 during his residency. Titled Shuriken, it dealt with the 1943 Featherston prisoner of war camp incident. He published seven collections of short stories and three novels; his first full-length novel, Let the River Stand, was published in 1993.

He was the editor of a number of notable anthologies, including An Anthology of Twentieth Century New Zealand Poetry (first published 1970, subsequent editions 1976 and 1987); scholar MacDonald P. Jackson describes it as having been "a standard text for a quarter of a century". Through his academic career O'Sullivan became known as a scholar of Katherine Mansfield; he was the co-editor of the five-volume Collected Letters of Katherine Mansfield (1984–2008) with Margaret Scott, and editor of Poems of Katherine Mansfield (1988) and Selected Letters (1989). He was a founding trustee and in later years co-patron of the Randell Cottage Writers' Trust, which runs a writers' residency.

In 2007, in honour of his 70th birthday, a festschrift was published celebrating O'Sullivan's work over his career, titled Still Shines When You Think of It (edited by Bill Manhire and Peter Whiteford).

== Honours and awards ==
In 1966, O'Sullivan won the NZSA Jessie Mackay Award for Best First Book of Poetry, in 1979 he received the Katherine Mansfield Memorial Award for a short story, and in 1994 he received the Katherine Mansfield Memorial Fellowship.

O'Sullivan has won the top prize for poetry at the New Zealand Book Awards on three occasions; for the collections Seeing You Asked in 1999, Nice Morning For It, Adam in 2005, and Us, Then in 2014. His first novel Let the River Stand received the top prize for fiction in 1993, and his second novel was runner-up for this prize in 1999. He also received the top prize for general non-fiction in 2021 for The Dark is Light Enough: Ralph Hotere a Biographical Portrait.

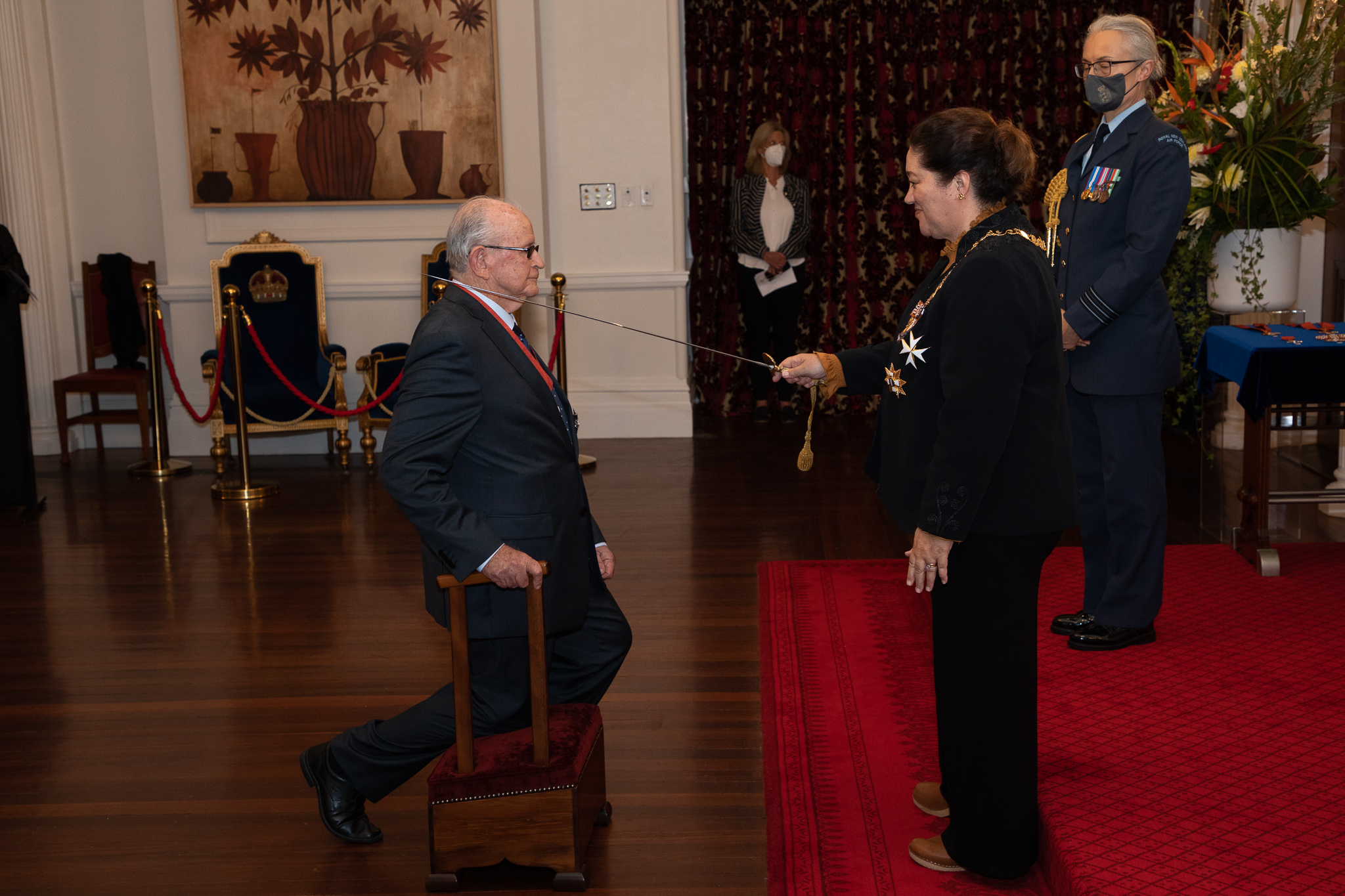
O'Sullivan's investiture as a Knight Companion of the New Zealand Order of Merit by the governor-general, Dame Cindy Kiro, at Government House, Wellington, on 2 May 2022

In the 2000 Queen's Birthday Honours, O'Sullivan was appointed a Distinguished Companion of the New Zealand Order of Merit, for services to literature. In 2009, following the restoration of titular honours by the New Zealand government, he initially declined redesignation as a Knight Companion of the New Zealand Order of Merit, because, in his view, it did not fit New Zealand "historically and socially", and that "it didn't seem to make much sense in contemporary New Zealand society". However, he accepted the change in December 2021.

In 2006 O'Sullivan received the Prime Minister's Award for Literary Achievement, worth $60,000, in recognition of his significant contribution to New Zealand poetry. Prime Minister Helen Clark said his poetry "goes to the heart of life's big themes – love, politics, philosophy, literature and history". O'Sullivan was awarded the Creative New Zealand Michael King Writer's Fellowship in 2004. In 2008 he received an honorary doctorate from the University of Auckland. He was the New Zealand Poet Laureate for the term 2013 to 2015, and in 2016 he was the Honoured New Zealand Writer at the Auckland Writers Festival. He was also a Fellow of the Academy of New Zealand Literature.

== Works ==
=== Poetry ===
- 1965 Our Burning Time
- 1969 Revenants
- 1973 Bearings
- 1976 From the Indian Funeral
- 1977 Butcher & Co.
- 1980 Brother Jonathan, Brother Kafka (with prints by John Drawbridge)
- 1982 The Rose Ballroom and Other Poems
- 1982 The Butcher Papers
- 1986 The Pilate Tapes
- 1992 Selected Poems
- 1998 Seeing You Asked
- 2001 Lucky Table
- 2004 Nice Morning for It, Adam
- 2004 "Homecoming – Te Hokinga Mai"
- 2007 Blame Vermeer
- 2009 Further Convictions Pending: Poems 1998–2008
- 2011 The Movie May Be Slightly Different
- 2013 Us, Then
- 2015 Being Here: Selected Poems
- 2016 And So It Is: New Poems

=== Short stories ===
- 1978 The Boy, The Bridge, The River
- 1981 Dandy Edison for Lunch and Other Stories
- 1985 Survivals
- 1990 The Snow in Spain: Short Stories
- 1992 Palms and Minarets: Selected Stories
- 2014 The Families: Stories
- 2022 Mary's Boy, Jean-Jacques and other stories

=== Novels ===
- 1976 Miracle: A Romance
- 1993 Let the River Stand
- 2018 All This by Chance

=== Plays ===
- 1983 Shuriken (Downstage, Wellington)
- 1984 Ordinary Nights in Ward 10 (New Depot, Wellington)
- 1988 Jones and Jones (Downstage, Wellington)
- 1989 Billy (Bats Theatre, Wellington)
- 1994 The Lives and Loves of Harry and George (Downstage, Wellington)
- 1996 Take the Moon, Mr Casement (Court Theatre, Christchurch)
- 2003 Yellow Brides
- 2021 Simple Acts of Malice

=== Non-fiction ===
- 1974 Katherine Mansfield's New Zealand (revised 2013)
- 1976 James K. Baxter (New Zealand Writers and Their Work series)
- 2002 On Longing (Montana Essay Series)
- 2003 Long Journey to the Border: A Life of John Mulgan
- 2020 Ralph Hotere: The Dark is Light Enough

=== Edited works ===
- 1970 An Anthology of Twentieth-Century New Zealand Poetry (revised 1976 and 1987)
- 1975 New Zealand Short Stories: Third Series
- 1983 The Oxford Anthology of New Zealand Writing Since 1945, co-editor with MacDonald P. Jackson
- 1982 The Aloe, with Prelude
- 1985 Collected Poems: Ursula Bethell
- 1988 Poems of Katherine Mansfield
- 1989 The Selected Letters of Katherine Mansfield
- 1992 The Oxford Book of New Zealand Short Stories
- 1993 Intersecting Lines: The Memoirs of Ian Milner
- 1997 New Zealand Stories: Katherine Mansfield
- 1984, 1987, 1993, 1996, 2008 The Collected Letters of Katherine Mansfield (vols. 1–5), co-editor with Margaret Scott
- 2006, 2012 The Collected Fiction of Katherine Mansfield, 1916–1922 (vols. 1–2), co-editor with Gerri Kimber

=== Librettos ===
- 2002 Black Ice (with composer Ross Harris)
- 2004 Lines from the Beach House (with composer David Farquhar)
- 2008 The Floating Bride, the Crimson Village (with composer Ross Harris)
- 2010 The Abiding Tides (with composer Ross Harris)
- 2012 Songs for Beatrice: Making Light of Time (with composer Ross Harris)
- 2014 Notes from the Front: Songs on Alexander Aitken (with composer Ross Harris)
- 2014 Requiem for the Fallen (with composer Ross Harris)
- 2014 If Blood Be the Price (with composer Ross Harris)
- 2016 Brass Poppies (with composer Ross Harris)
- 2018 Face (with composer Ross Harris)

=== Festschrift ===
- 2007 Still Shines When You Think of It: A Festschrift for Vincent O'Sullivan, edited by Bill Manhire and Peter Whiteford

== News coverage ==
- "10 Questions: Vincent O'Sullivan", New Zealand String Quartet, 20 February 2014
- "Vincent O'Sullivan: NZ poet, author, biographer", Radio New Zealand, 28 February 2014
- "Ross Harris and Vincent O'Sullivan", Radio New Zealand, 1 March 2016
- "Let us now contemplate what to do with Katherine Mansfield's bones: A proposal by Vincent O'Sullivan", The Spinoff, 28 March 2017
- "Vincent O'Sullivan's first novel in 20 years a 'landmark book' for NZ literature", by Mike White, North & South, 5 November 2018
- "The deep discomfort of remembering, Ann Beaglehole', New Zealand Review of Books / Pukapuka Aotearoa, 6 June 2018
- All This by Chance reviewed by Nicholas Reid on Stuff, 11 March 2018
- "Book of the Week: The best New Zealand novel of 2018": All This by Chance reviewed by Elizabeth Alley, The Spinoff, 22 March 2018
- All This by Chance reviewed by Marcus Hobson on NZ Booklovers
- All This by Chance reviewed by Lesley McIntosh on The Reader, NZ Booksellers blog, 19 April 2018
- "Acclaimed writers Vincent O'Sullivan and Diana Wichtel explore their very different approaches to representing the Holocaust', Radio New Zealand, 26 December 2018
- "The Confession Box: Vincent O'Sullivan", The New Zealand Herald, 11 May 2019

== See also ==
- New Zealand literature
- Best New Zealand Poems

Cultural offices
| Preceded by Ian Wedde | New Zealand Poet Laureate; 2013–2015 | Succeeded by C. K. Stead |
