= Marriage à la Mode (short story) =

1921 short story by Katherine Mansfield

"Marriage à la Mode" is a 1921 short story by Katherine Mansfield. It was first published in The Sphere on 31 December 1921, and later reprinted in The Garden Party and Other Stories.

== Background ==
The title is inspired by a series of paintings by William Hogarth, called Marriage A-la-Mode. The story was sometimes seen as a minor work in Mansfield oeuvre, because it was published in The Sphere, a more popular (and less literary) newspaper, but critics including Saralyn R. Daly and Anna Kwiatkowska argue that the story is more complex than is often thought, and that Mansfield herself took the stories she published in The Sphere very seriously.

The text is written in the modernist mode, without a set structure, and with many shifts in the narrative.

== Plot summary ==
Isabel, the wife of bourgeois William, has taken up with a new group of friends, poets and artists, who are living it up at their house, at their expense, and do little more than chat and produce highly questionable modern art. She no longer wants their children to have conventional toys; she wants them to become artists. On the day the story narrates, he has bought them fruit.

Isabel then picks up William at the train station, and her affected, Bohemian friends are there. Bobby Kane joins them on the way, and Isabel pays for the sweets he bought. They all go bathing except for William and they come back late, loud, and saying bad things about William. Then at dinner they overeat, and tuck in. The next day, William returns to London for work. On the train, he writes a letter to his wife.

While they are out in the garden, Isabel receives the letter and reads it out loud to her friends, who find it hilarious. She then runs to her bedroom and feels ashamed of having read it to them. She comes to the conclusion that she will write to her husband later but for the time being she will go back to her friends.

== Characters ==
- William, the husband
- Isabel, the wife
- Paddy, one of their children
- Johnny, one of their children
- Bill Hunt, a new friend of Isabel
- Dennis Green, a new friend of Isabel
- Moira Morrison, a new friend of Isabel
- Bobby Kane, a new friend of Isabel

== References to other works ==
- According to C. A. Hankin, the group of friends is based on "the artsy coterie that surrounded Lady Ottoline Morrell at Garsington Hall" early in the 1900s.
- William Shakespeare's A Midsummer Night's Dream is alluded to when Isabel is called 'Titania'.
- Considered to be Katherine Mansfield's homage to Anton Chekhov's "The Grasshopper". Both short stories share a very similar cast of characters and plot, however Chekhov's story has the husband die before the wife can become aware of her negative behavior.
