= The Stranger (Mansfield short story) =

1921 short story by Katherine Mansfield

"The Stranger" is a 1921 short story by Katherine Mansfield. It was first published in the London Mercury in January 1921, and later reprinted in The Garden Party and Other Stories.

== Plot summary ==
In Auckland, Mr Hammond is waiting for his wife, back from Europe. After talking to some other people waiting at the harbour, she lands in but takes her time, leading him to wonder if she was sick during the voyage - she was not.

In the hotel, Hammond says they will spend the next day sightseeing in Auckland, before going back to Napier, where they live. She then appears distant, and eventually reveals that she took a while to leave the ship because a man had died on board, and she was alone with him when that happened. The husband is put off.

== Characters ==
- Mr Scott
- Mrs Scott
- Jean Scott, their daughter.
- Mr John Hammond
- Mrs Janey Hammond, back from Europe.
- Mr Gaven
- Captain Johnson, the harbour master.
- The dead man

== Major motifs ==
- Love
- Death
