= The Daughters of the Late Colonel =

1920 short story by Katherine Mansfield

"The Daughters of the Late Colonel" is a 1920 short story by Katherine Mansfield. It was first published in the London Mercury in May 1921, and later reprinted in The Garden Party and Other Stories.

== Plot summary ==
In bed, Constantia suggests giving her late father's top hat to the porter, but her sister Josephine disagrees. After thinking about letters to be sent to Ceylon, they hear a noise coming from a mouse. Constantia thinks how sad it must be for the mouse with no crumbs around. The last time the sisters saw their father, Nurse Andrews was stationed by the bedside; the Colonel opened only one eye, glaring at his daughters before dying. Nurse Andrews, whom they invited to stay for a week after the Colonel died, is annoying them by overeating. Mr. Farolles, a clergyman who offers to arrange the funeral, visits and suggests they take Holy Communion, to feel better, but the sisters demur.

Two mornings later, the daughters go to sort out their father's belongings. Josephine feels he would have been angry at the cost of the funeral. They consider sending their father's watch to their brother, Benny, but are concerned that there is no postal service there. They think of giving the watch to their nephew, Cyril. As they talk about the watch, they recall Cyril coming over for tea, and their conversation.

Kate the maid asks boldly how the sisters want their fish cooked for dinner, for which they could not give a straight answer, so that Kate had to decide how the fish has to be cooked, which eventually leads them to decide about firing Kate. They wonder whether she snoops inside their dresser drawers. They hear a barrel organ and realize they need not stop it, because it no longer disturbs their father. They wonder how things would be, if their mother, who died in Ceylon, were still alive. They've never met men, except perhaps in Eastbourne. Finally, the sisters talk about their future, but cannot remember what they wanted to say.

== Characters ==
- The late Colonel/Grandfather Pinner: The tyrannical father of Constantia and Josephine. Cyril's grandfather. He had died and been buried a week before the story begins.
- Josephine Pinner: Mr Farolles calls her 'Miss Pinner'. Constantia calls her 'Jug'.
- Constantia Pinner: Josephine's younger sister, who Josephine calls 'Con'.
- Kate, the maid to the Pinners.
- The porter
- Nurse Andrews: Nurse to the late Colonel in his dying days, staying one more week with the Pinner family
- Mr. Farolles: Clergy at the local St. John's church, and an old friend of the late Colonel
- Mr. Knight
- Benny Pinner: the late colonel's son, now living in Ceylon.
- Hilda: Benny's wife
- Cyril: Hilda and Benny's son

== Literary significance ==
This short story is written in the modernist mode, without a set structure, and with many shifts in narrative.
