= Tyree Studio =

Photographic studio in New Zealand

Tyree Studio was a photographic business in Nelson, New Zealand that operated from 1878 until 1942. It was founded by William Tyree in 1878 in Trafalgar Street, Nelson. William's younger brother Frederick worked for the studio infrequently before establishing himself in Tākaka in 1889.

Fred and William Tyree were the sons of William Tyree, a master bootmaker, and his second wife, Elizabeth Frances Baker. William was the eldest child and was born in Christ Church, Surrey, England on 19 April 1855. Fred Tyree was born on 7 March 1867. In 1871 the family emigrated to New Zealand on the Otago.

In 1878 William Tyree established the Tyree Studio in Trafalgar Street, Nelson. The photographic studio specialised in studio portraits, processing and civic occasions of the Nelson region. William and Fred Tyree both ventured into other businesses and sold the Tyree Studio to their photography assistant, Rosaline Frank in 1914.

Rosaline (Rose) Frank (1864–1954) began working at the Tyree Studio in 1886 as a 21-year-old and managed the business for 52 years, purchasing it from William Tyree in 1914. Rose finally sold the business in 1947 aged 82, 61 years after she began work there as an assistant to the Tyree brothers, to Cecil Manson.

Frank retained the large collection of glass plate negatives from the business after she sold it, and donated them shortly before her death in 1954 to the Nelson Historical Society. In 1973 the society donated approximately 105,000 surviving glass plate negatives from the Tyree Studio to the Nelson Provincial Museum who holds them as part of their large photographic collection. These negatives make up a large number of the Glass Plate Negative Project started by the Nelson Provincial Museum in 2010.

In 2017 UNESCO's Memory of the World Trust included the Tyree photo collection on New Zealand's documentary heritage register.
