= Nelson Provincial Museum =

Regional museum in Nelson, New Zealand

Coordinates: 41.2745°S 173.2835°E

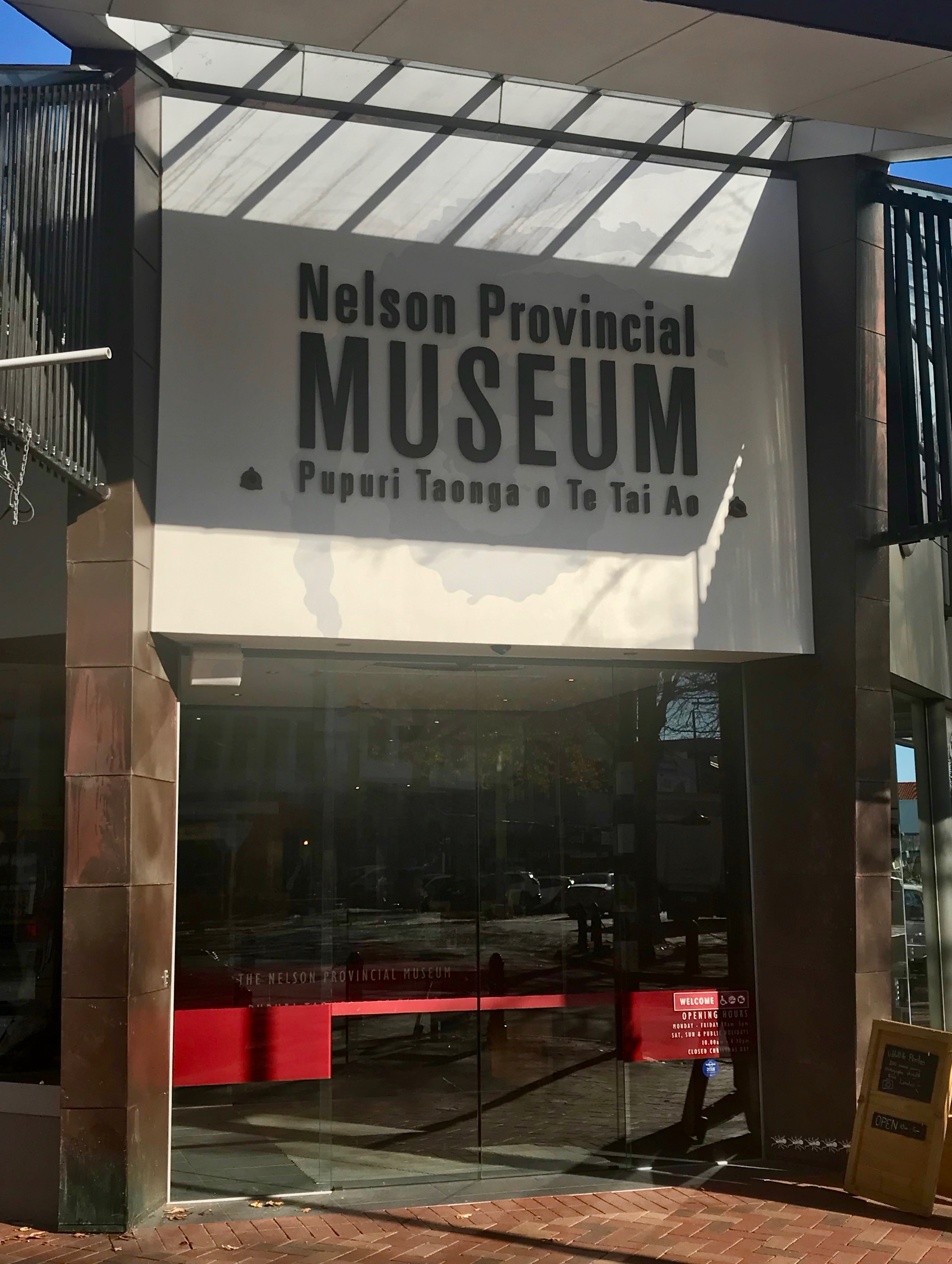
Nelson Provincial Museum entrance

The Nelson Provincial Museum, Pupuri Taonga O Te Tai Ao is a regional museum in the city of Nelson, New Zealand. The museum showcases the Nelson and Tasman regions' history, from geological origins to the stories of individuals and families.

Nelson Provincial Museum holds over 1.4 million items of interest, collected during the past 160 years. Exhibitions are shown in a modern building that opened in 2005, costing NZ$5 million, funded by the community, private and public benefactors, the Nelson City Council, Tasman District Council and central government. The collections, professional staff and public research services are housed in the former museum building, which is located in Isel Park, Stoke.

== History ==
The Literary and Scientific Institution of Nelson was founded in May 1841 in the Bay of Biscay amongst the officers of the preliminary Expedition of the Second Colony, on board the New Zealand Company's ships Whitby and Will-Watch.

Prior to the expedition reaching Tenerife, a sum of money was subscribed amongst the officers. It was transmitted back to England with directions for the selection of a number of books "of a useful character", which would form the basis of the library of the Institution.

While a large number of books were acquired, subscribed to and collected by friends and associates of the Colony and Colonialists, the Committee noted that "they would be glad to receive maps, charts manuscripts, drawings, paintings, engravings, sculptures, casts, models of inventions and objects of natural history generally. These will be placed in the Museum of the Institution, and a record will be kept of the names of the donors."

In late 1842 the Literary and Scientific Institution of Nelson (the institute) opened on Trafalgar Street, firstly as a library (with attached Museum storehouse) and subsequently incorporating the museum, with a membership of sixty by 1844.

By 1861 the Institute had outgrown its Trafalgar Street premises and relocated to a wooden building in Hardy Street. Fire broke out in 1906. While most of the collection was rescued, it was resolved to rebuild as a brick building, which opened in 1912. Until 1963, the museum was located on the second level of the institute, with the Nelson Library located on the first level.

Independence grew throughout the 1960s with the relocation of the Museum firstly to the former home of the Marsden family (Isel House), and subsequently to a concrete block construction, designed by Alex Bowman, which opened in 1973.

A Māori History Gallery was opened in 1983m the teaching space was modified in 1984, and in a new workshop, storeroom and darkroom was completed in 1986.

The Nelson Institute, Nelson Public Library and Nelson Provincial Museum are the contemporary successors of The Literary and Scientific Institution of Nelson.

The museum has been managed since 1965 by a myriad of committees representing the financial interests of a number of councils within the region. During 2000, Tasman Bays Heritage Trust was formed by Tasman District and Nelson City Councils, in partnership with the Iwi Trust Authorities of Te Tau Ihu as a move away from the traditional council administration system into an independent Trust Board, supported by both Nelson City Council and Tasman District Council. The new body was constituted as Tasman Bays Heritage Trust.

In 2001 Tasman Bays Heritage Trust acquired a site on the corner of Hardy and Trafalgar Streets, Nelson, which formed part of the original Town Acre 445 block. In 2002 the Trust appointed Andrew Irving, of Ian Jack Architects (now Irving, Smith, Jack Architects) as project architect. In 2004 the tender for the project was awarded to Wilkes Construction, of Nelson, a fifth generation family construction firm. In 2005, after significant local and national support, the redeveloped museum was opened on the 200th anniversary of the Battle of Trafalgar.

The 1973 site in Isel Park continues to operate as a research facility for the museum.

== Collection ==
Collections include:

- Kingdon-Tomlinson family silver collection dating from 1594–1800 and consists of over 140 pieces. It was given to the people of Nelson and the surrounding region by Deed of Trust by Julie Annie Tomlinson in 1959.
- Bett Collection (the nucleus of an extensive and growing historical library and archives). Dr Francis Arnot (or Arnott) Blackader Bett, commonly known as Dr. F. A. Bett, (1873–1957) passionately collected books, photographs, maps, documents, sketches and paintings relating to the Nelson province.
- Marsden Collection. A rare and beautiful collection of eighteenth and nineteenth century antique furniture, plate, glassware and porcelain – including Sèvres, Dresden and Worcester. This has been consolidated from an original bequest together with separate holdings formerly held by the Cawthron Institute and the Anglican Diocese of Nelson The Marsden Book Collection is also held at the museum dating from 1773 to the early 1920s and relates to natural history, discovery and exploration of the Pacific.
- Tyree Studio Collection of more than 105,000 photographic negatives is one of the most comprehensive social history collections in New Zealand. William Tyree (1855–1924) and Frederick Tyree (1867–1924) were the sons of a master boot-maker from Surrey, England. In 1871, the Tyrees arrived in New Zealand. By 1878, William had established the Tyree Studio in Trafalgar Street, Nelson, and by 1884 his younger brother, Frederick, and Rosaline Frank were working as his assistants. Their Aunt's Victorian decorative tiled fireplace is installed in Amber House nearby. The Tyree Studio Collection was added to the UNESCO Memory of the World Aotearoa New Zealand Ngā Mahara o te Ao register in 2017.

Until 1895, William Tyree methodically documented and recorded the social history of the region and from 1910, when he moved to Sydney, Rosaline Frank managed the Tyree Studio. Frederick Tyree established his own photographic business in Tākaka, Golden Bay, and continued his interest in photography until his death in 1924. The Tyree Studio continued to operate until 1947 under the ownership of Rosaline Frank.

- The F.N. Jones (Frederick Nelson Jones) collection consists of over 10,000 negatives of important civic events from around the Nelson region. Frederick Nelson Jones was considered to be one of the first photojournalists of his time.
- The Nelson Mail Photographic Collection of images from 1979 to 1994. More than 205,000 individual negatives and growing.
- Other collections: Geoffrey C Wood Collection, Manson Collection, Prouse Collection, Nelson College Collection, Jenkins Collection, F G Gibbs Collection, Greenwood Collection, Knapp Collection, W E Brown Collection, Ellis Dudgeon Collection, Reg & Hugh Kingsford Collection, The Nelson Evening Mail Newspaper Collection, The Examiner, The Colonist.

== Projects ==
- The Glass Plate Negative Project was launched on 24 November 2010 to relocate over 150,000 glass plate negatives from mobile shelving into industry standard storage. Before being packed away into their new storage the negatives are digitally photographed for use in the Museum's online collection database. Funding for this project was secured from the New Zealand Lottery Grant Board, private benefactors and Tasman Bays Heritage Trust. Over 100,000 glass plate negatives have now been digitised and relocated through this project.

== Director ==
Curator

- Lt. Col. Cyprian Bridge Brereton, (1876–1962), Curator, −1960;

Director

- Jim Eyles (James Roy Eyles) OBE (1926–2004), Director;
- Steve Bagley, Director
- Dr John Rudge, Director

Museum Manager

- M Hubert Klaassens, Museum Manager, 1998–2001;
- Lesley Baxter, Acting Museum Manager, 2001

Chief Executive

- Wayne P Marriott, Chief Executive, 2001–2007;
- Cathy Knight, Acting Chief Executive, 2007;
- Robert (Bob) Dickinson, Chief Executive, 2007–2008;
- Peter Millward, Chief Executive, 2008–2015
- Lucinda Blackley-Jimson, Chief Executive, 2015–
