= Sheilah Winn =

New Zealand arts patron and philanthropist (1917–2001)

Sheilah Winn CBE
- Born: Sheilah Maureen Hannah; 10 June 1917; Wellington, New Zealand
- Died: 27 June 2001 (aged 84); Christchurch, New Zealand
- Occupations: Arts patron; philanthropist
- Spouse: Percy Brian Winn (m. 1936)
- Children: 1
- Relatives: Edith Campion (cousin)

Sheilah Maureen Winn CBE (née Hannah; 10 June 1917 – 27 June 2001) was a New Zealand arts patron and philanthropist. Having received a large inheritance, she used her money to support her love of the arts and particularly the theatre. Notably, she was the founding donor of the Hannah Playhouse in 1966, co-founder of the Katherine Mansfield Menton Fellowship in 1970, and principal sponsor of the National SGCNZ Sheilah Winn Festivals of Shakespeare in Schools (SSGCNZ SWFSS) in 1992.

== Early life and family ==
Winn was born in Wellington on 10 June 1917. She was the daughter of James Alexander Hannah and Sybil Maud (née Johnson). She described herself as a mediocre school student, but said one of her successes was playing the character of Bottom in a school performance of A Midsummer Night's Dream, "ass's head and all". She attended Samuel Marsden Collegiate School from 1928 to 1933, and in 2016 the school inducted her into its old girls Hall of Fame.

Her grandfather Robert Hannah was the founder of the Hannah's footwear chain, and she used her large inheritance to support her love of the arts and travel. When asked why she contributed so generously to the arts, she said: "Because I derive so much pleasure from seeing artists displaying their talents and wares and anyway, what else could I do with my money?" She said she would have liked to have been a performer herself but that supporting the arts was a rewarding alternative. She was a first cousin of actress Edith Campion.

She lived partly in Wellington and partly in Christchurch. On 1 December 1936 she married Percy Brian Winn, and they had one son.

== Philanthropy ==
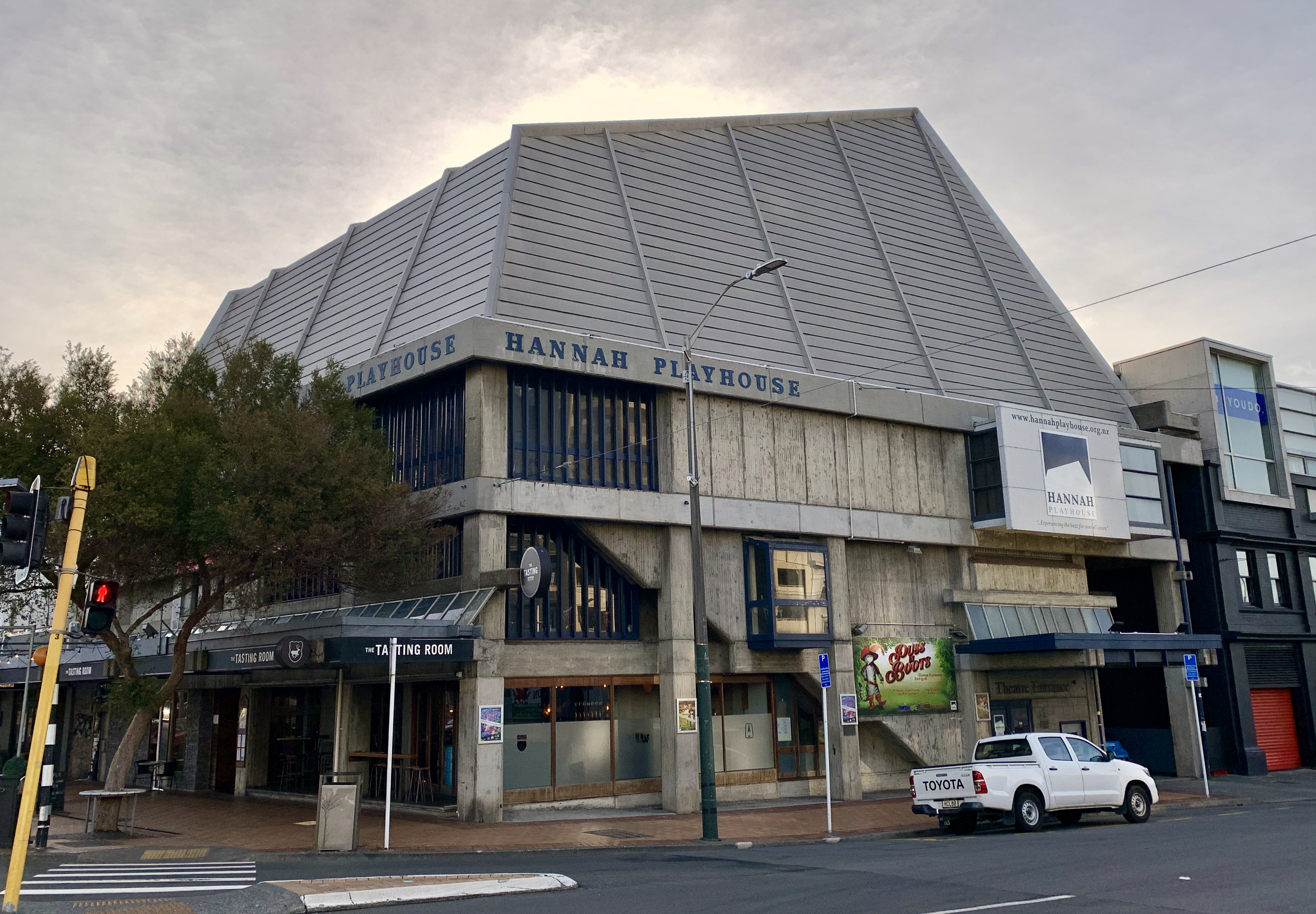
Hannah Playhouse

In 1966 she founded the Sheilah Maureen Winn Charitable Trust, and in 1968 she donated NZ$300,000 to found the Hannah Playhouse in Wellington, named for her father's family. On its opening in 1973 she said: "The theatre measures up to all my expectations. It is intimate in its atmosphere and it is cosy. I feel I have something to live for." The delays and stress of building, however, led her to decide that she would in future donate to artists and art organisations directly. She was also the patron of the Downstage Theatre, the professional theatre company that occupied the playhouse until 2013, and donated in support of several other New Zealand theatres including the Isaac Theatre Royal and the Court Theatre. In Christchurch she funded the Christian Unity Chapel in the Cathedral of the Blessed Sacrament, which was blessed and opened by Pope John Paul II, and the stained glass windows at St Mary's Church. She also made many unpublicised and anonymous donations to other causes throughout her life.

She was the co-founder of the Katherine Mansfield Menton Fellowship in 1970, together with New Zealand writer Celia Manson. They conceived the fellowship together in the 1960s, after Manson and her husband discovered that a room was available for rent at the Villa Isola Bella in Menton where Mansfield did some of her most significant writing. They formed a committee in Wellington to raise funds. Their vision was "to give a selected New Zealand writer a period of leisure to write or study [in] a different and more ancient culture, and thereby to see [their] own remote country in a better perspective". She also supported the New Zealand Women Writers' Society and the Katherine Mansfield Birthplace Society.

She was a principal sponsor of the National SGCNZ Sheilah Winn Festivals of Shakespeare in Schools (SGCNZ SWFSS) of 1992 and of the National Festivals in the following years. SGCNZ (Shakespeare Globe Centre New Zealand) was founded by Dawn Sanders in 1991. SGCNZ held their first Regional Festivals in 1992, back then called the SGCNZ Festival of Shakespeare in Schools. With SGCNZ's successful application to Sheilah Winn's Trust for funding of the 1992 National Festival, the name was changed to SGCNZ Sheilah Winn Festivals of Shakespeare in Schools (SGCNZ SWFSS). Later it was shortened to SGCNZ Sheilah Winn Shakespeare Festivals (SGCNZ SWSF). As of 2022 the festival was still running, and was re-named University of Otago Sheilah Winn Shakespeare Festival (UOSWSF) since the University of Otago took over as a major sponsor. Until her death she attended the Canterbury regional competitions for the festival on an annual basis.

In 1990 Winn founded the Sheilah Winn Trust for the Promotion of the Arts. In 1993 she supported the Women's Suffrage Centennial Year commemorations in New Zealand, marking 100 years of women's suffrage, and helped fund New Zealand's artistic contribution of embroidered stage hangings for Shakespeare's Globe in London, which opened in 1997.

Winn died on 27 June 2001 at Christchurch Hospital, aged 84. New Zealand's prime minister Helen Clark said on her death: "Through her unstinting financial generosity and encouragement, Sheilah Winn has supported a wide range of artistic endeavour in New Zealand, from theatre, to weaving, to literature."

== Honours and awards ==
Winn was made a Commander of the Order of the British Empire in the 1980 Birthday Honours for her services to the arts. In 1988 she was made an Officer of the Order of St Lazarus of Jerusalem, and in 1992 she was made a Commander.

In 1999 she was presented with an award by the mayor of Wellington, Mark Blumsky, for her significant contribution to theatre at the Chapman Tripp Theatre Awards. In the same year she was presented with a Civic Award by the Christchurch City Council for her work promoting Shakespeare in schools.
