= Life of Ma Parker =

1921 short story by Katherine Mansfield

"Life of Ma Parker" is a 1921 short story by Katherine Mansfield. It was first published in The Nation and Atheneum on 26 February 1921, and later reprinted in The Garden Party and Other Stories.

== Plot summary ==
The gentleman opens his door to his charwoman, who tells him that her grandson has died. In an analepsis, the grandson asks his grandmother for money, which she says she does not have. She then thinks back to her move to London; her husband's death; her grandson's death. After cleaning the gentleman's house, she wishes she had somewhere she could go and cry, but as it starts raining she realises she cannot even do that outside – and Ethel is at home, thus preventing her from doing it there too.

== Characters ==
- the young literary gentleman
- Ma Parker, his charwoman. She was born in Stratford-upon-Avon.
- Mr Parker, a baker, Ma Parker's deceased husband.
- Maudie, a daughter of Ma Parker's.
- Alice, a daughter of Ma Parker's.
- two other sons of Ma Parker's.
- Jim, a son of Ma Parker's, who went to India in the army.
- Lennie, Ma Parker's deceased grandson.
- Ethel, Ma Parker's daughter, and the mother of Lennie.

== Major themes ==
- class-consciousness: the gentleman believes Ma Parker only cared about the funeral, and is not upset about the untimely death itself. The difficulty of her job and of her life is also emphasised many times.

== Literary significance ==
The text is written in the modernist mode, without a set structure, and with many shifts in the narrative.
