= Antonia Lyons =

New Zealand health psychology academic

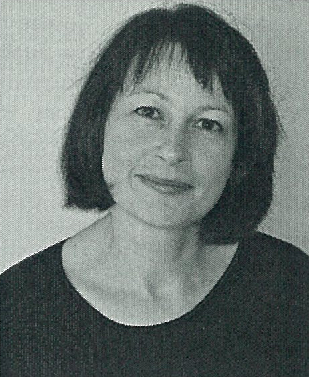
- Education: Massey University
- Scientific career
- Fields: social psychology, gender psychology
- Workplaces: Massey University
- Thesis: Constructing the self : conversations and cardiovascular reactivity (1996)
- Doctoral advisor: Kerry Chamberlain

Antonia Catherine Lyons is a critical health psychologist and academic at the University of Auckland.

== Career ==
Lyons completed her PhD at Massey University in 1996. Her first academic post was as lecturer in health psychology at the University of Birmingham, UK, from 1996 to 2002. She returned to Massey University (NZ; Albany and Wellington campuses) and rose to professor at this institution. Lyons took up the role of Professor of Health Psychology at Victoria University of Wellington in 2018, where she is also Head of School, School of Health.

In 2009, Lyons received a Marsden Fund grant to study young adults, their drinking and social media called 'Young Adults, Drinking Stories and the Cult of Celebrity.' In 2004 Lyons received a fast-start Marsden Fund grant called 'Working hard, playing hard: Gender relations and alcohol consumption'.

Lyons contributes to blogs such as The Conversation and Sciblogs.co.nz

== Selected works ==
- Lyons, A.C., McCreanor, T., Goodwin, I., & Moewaka Barnes, H. (Eds). (2017). Youth drinking cultures in a digital world: Alcohol, social media and cultures of intoxication. Abingdon UK: Routledge.
- Rohleder, P & Lyons, A.C. (Eds.). (2015). Qualitative research in clinical and health psychology. Basingstoke UK: Palgrave MacMillan.
- Lyons, Antonia C., and Sara A. Willott. "Alcohol consumption, gender identities and women's changing social positions." Sex roles 59, no. 9-10 (2008): 694–712.
- Lyons, Antonia C., and Kerry Chamberlain. Health psychology: A critical introduction. Cambridge University Press, 2006.
- Treharne, Gareth J., George D. Kitas, Antonia C. Lyons, and David A. Booth. "Well-being in rheumatoid arthritis: the effects of disease duration and psychosocial factors." Journal of health psychology 10, no. 3 (2005): 457–474.
- Treharne, Gareth J., Antonia C. Lyons, David A. Booth, and George D. Kitas. "Psychological well-being across 1 year with rheumatoid arthritis: Coping resources as buffers of perceived stress." British journal of health psychology 12, no. 3 (2007): 323–345.
