= Addiction Research & Theory =

- Discipline: Anthropology, Economics, Epidemiology, Sociology, Psychology, History
- Language: English
- Edited by: Derek Heim

Publication details
- Former name: Addiction Research
- History: 1993–present
- Publisher: Taylor & Francis
- Frequency: Biannual
- Open access: Hybrid
- Impact factor: 2.0 (2024)

Standard abbreviations
- ISO 4: Addctn. Res. Theory
- NLM: Addict Res Theory

Indexing
- ISSN: 1606-6359 (print); 1476-7392 (web)
- LCCN: 2007233097
- OCLC no.: 50409807

Links
- Journal homepage

Addiction Research & Theory is a cross-disciplinary peer-reviewed academic journal that publishes research on addictive behavior from across the social sciences, including anthropology, economics, epidemiology, sociology, psychology, and history. It is published by Taylor & Francis.

== Abstracting and indexing ==
Journal Citation Reports ranked Addiction Research & Theory with an impact factor of 2.0 in 2024, placing it 25th out of 69 journals in the category "Social Issues".
