= Critical Public Health =

- Cover of Critical Public Health
- Discipline: Public health
- Language: English
- Edited by: Joe Thomas (Institute of Health & Management, Melbourne, Australia)

Publication details
- Former name: Radical Community Medicine
- History: 1979–present
- Publisher: Routledge
- Frequency: Quarterly
- Open access: since 2024
- Impact factor: 2.412 (2017)

Standard abbreviations
- ISO 4: Crit. Public Health

Indexing
- ISSN: 0958-1596 (print); 1469-3682 (web)
- LCCN: sn99040997
- OCLC no.: 869935477

Links
- Journal homepage; Online archive; Contents of current issue

Critical Public Health is a quarterly peer-reviewed public health journal. It was established in 1979 as Radical Community Medicine, obtaining its current name in 1990. It is published by Routledge and the editor-in-chief is Joe Thomas (Institute of Health & Management, Melbourne, Australia). According to the Journal Citation Reports, the journal has a 2017 impact factor of 2.412. In July 2023 the editors of the journal all resigned citing differences with the commercial model of the publisher Taylor and Francis. The editors have started a new journal called Journal of Critical Public Health.
