= Dominic O'Sullivan =

New Zealand political science academic (born 1970)

- Born: 1970 (age 55–56); Hamilton, New Zealand
- Education: University of Waikato
- Known for: Author; political scientist
- Relatives: Vincent O'Sullivan (father)
- Scientific career
- Fields: Political science
- Workplaces: University of Waikato; Charles Sturt University
- Thesis: Faith, politics and reconciliation : the Roman Catholic Church, New Zealand Maori and indigenous Australians (2003)
- Website: Charles Sturt University profile

Dominic O'Sullivan (born 1970) is a New Zealand political scientist. He has been an academic at Charles Sturt University in Australia since 2008, and is an honorary fellow of the Royal Society of New Zealand.

== Academic career ==
O'Sullivan currently works at Charles Sturt University where he is a professor of political science. O'Sullivan is also an adjunct professor in the Centre for Māori Health at AUT University. He is an adjunct professor at the Stout Center for New Zealand Studies at Victoria University of Wellington. Prior to his work at Charles Sturt University, he was a senior teacher and research fellow at the University of Waikato where he completed his PhD titled Faith, politics and reconciliation: the Roman Catholic Church, New Zealand Maori and indigenous Australians. O’Sullivan attended Rosmini College, Auckland between 1982 and 1987.

O'Sullivan's primary area of interest is the politics relating to indigenous peoples.

== Selected publications ==
- O’Sullivan, D. Beyond Biculturalism: the Politics of an Indigenous Minority. Wellington. Huia Publishers, 2007
- Bishop, Russell, Dominic O'Sullivan, and Mere Berryman. Scaling up Education Reform: Addressing the Politics of Disparity. New Zealand Council for Educational Research. PO Box 3237, Wellington 6140 New Zealand, 2010.
- O'Sullivan, Dominic. "The treaty of Waitangi in contemporary New Zealand politics." Australian Journal of Political Science 43, no. 2 (2008): 317–331.
- O'Sullivan, Dominic. "Needs, rights, nationhood, and the politics of indigeneity." MAI Review LW 1, no. 1 (2006): 12.
- O’Sullivan, D. Indigeneity: a politics of potential – Australia, Fiji and New Zealand. Bristol. Policy Press, 2017.
- O’Sullivan, D. Indigenous Health: power, politics and citizenship. Melbourne. Australian Scholarly Publishing, 2015.
- O’Sullivan, D. Faith Politics and Reconciliation: Catholicism and the Politics of Indigeneity. Wellington. Huia Publishers and Adelaide. ATF Press, 2005
- O’Sullivan, D. Sharing the Sovereign: Indigenous Peoples, Recognition, Treaties and the State. Singapore. Palgrave Macmillan, 2021
- O’Sullivan, D. ‘We Are All Here to Stay’: Citizenship, Sovereignty and the UN Declaration on the Rights of Indigenous Peoples. Canberra. ANU Press, 2020
- O’Sullivan, D. and Piper, C. Turanga Ngatahi: Standing Together: The Catholic Diocese of Hamilton 1840–2005. Wellington. Dunmore Publishing, 2005
- O’Sullivan, D. ‘Postcolonialism’ in Hayward, J. (ed.) New Zealand Government and Politics. Melbourne. Oxford University Press, 2015
- O’Sullivan, D. ‘Maori self-determination and a liberal theory of indigeneity’. In Indigenous Self-Determination: Theoretical and Practical Approaches. Marc Woons (ed). Bristol. E-International Relations. 2014, pp. 64–71

== Personal life ==
O'Sullivan was born in 1970 in Hamilton to Tui Walsh and Vincent O'Sullivan. He is Māori, of Te Rarawa, Ngāti Kahu descent.
