= Fergus Barrowman =

New Zealand publisher and literary commentator

Fergus Barrowman MNZM
- Born: 1961 (age 64–65)
- Occupation: Publisher
- Known for: Te Herenga Waka University Press and Sport magazine
- Spouse: Elizabeth Knox (m. 1989)
- Children: 1
- Website: Official profile

Fergus Barrowman (born 1961) MNZM is a New Zealand publisher and literary commentator. He has been Publisher at Te Herenga Waka University Press (formerly Victoria University Press) since 1985.

== Career ==
=== Te Herenga Waka University Press (formerly Victoria University Press) ===
Fergus Barrowman began working at Victoria University Press in 1984, as assistant to editor Pamela Tomlinson. Tomlinson died suddenly in 1985 and Barrowman kept the publishing programme going and was appointed editor in September 1985.

Under Barrowman's leadership, the press grew into one of New Zealand's major publishers, publishing literary fiction, poetry, essays, creative nonfiction, memoir, biography, and scholarly work. By 2026, it had published approximately 1,000 books.

Under Barrowman's leadership, the Press has worked with several generations of significant New Zealand writers, including Elizabeth Knox, Keri Hulme, Damien Wilkins, Emily Perkins, Catherine Chidgey, Eleanor Catton, Ashleigh Young, pip adam and Hera Lindsay Bird. The Press's development happened alongside the development of Victoria University's Creative Writing Programme, which eventually became the International Institute of Modern Letters. This symbiotic relationship, and the university's financial backing of the Press, allowed Barrowman to publish literary work that might be too much of a risk for commercial publishers.

His role in New Zealand literature received recognition in the 2014 Queen's Birthday Honours, when he was made a member of the New Zealand Order of Merit for services to publishing. The Publishers Association of New Zealand said Barrowman had “championed many fledgling New Zealand authors who have gone on to receive international recognition”. The Association's then-president Sam Elworthy described Barrowman as “one of this country's great literary explorers”, acknowledging his role in identifying and supporting new writers and bringing New Zealand literature to wider audiences.

In 2019, Victoria University adopted the Māori name Te Herenga Waka ("the mooring place of canoes"), which previously just referred to the university marae. The press changed its name as of 1 January 2022 to Te Herenga Waka University Press. It adopted a new logo, designed by Philip Kelly and Rangi Kipa, which uses the initials THW to evoke a whare whakairo (carved meeting house).

=== Sport magazine ===
In addition to running Victoria University Press, Barrowman also edited and published the New Zealand literary magazine Sport from 1988 until its final issue in 2019. He co-founded the magazine with Elizabeth Knox, Damien Wilkins, and Nigel Cox, with assistance from Bill Manhire, Alan Preston, and Andrew Mason. The name was Barrowman's idea, and he intended it to be a playful reference to the divide between the worlds of sport and literature. He noted in 2005 that the name can cause problems: "I still get people saying I've never looked at Sport because I don't like sport".

Sport became an important venue for New Zealand writing, especially from exciting emerging authors. It published the first works of Emily Perkins and Catherine Chidgey, as well as being an early publisher of Kate Flannery, Annamarie Jagose, Chris Orsman, and Peter Wells. In 2008, Eleanor Catton's work first appeared in Sport, before the publication of her first novel, The Rehearsal. Barrowman wrote that he established the magazine in part because the Press could only publish a limited number of books each year and he was encountering so many writers whose work he wanted to share with readers that he needed another venue.

=== Other editing ===
In 1996, Barrowman edited The Picador Book of Contemporary New Zealand Fiction. David Eggleton, in a review for The Dominion Post, commented: "Barrowman displays genuine talent as a connoisseur, showing us why we should sit up and take notice of the best of New Zealand writing." Michael Morrissey in the Sunday Star-Times was critical, however, saying that the anthology was dominated by Wellington writers and that important contemporary short story writers such as Michael Gifkins and Sherridan Keith had been omitted. He concluded: "This is a great collection marred by some regrettable omissions and by aggressive Wellington agendas."

== Personal life ==
As of 2026, Barrowman lives mostly in Golden Bay, along with his wife, the author Elizabeth Knox. Barrowman and Knox met when he was involved in publishing her first book, After Z-Hour (1987), and married in 1989.

== See also ==
- New Zealand literature
- Te Herenga Waka University Press
- Victoria University of Wellington
- International Institute of Modern Letters
- Sport (Literary magazine)
