= Mikaela Nyman =

Finnish-New Zealand writer

- Born: 1966 (age 59–60); Åland, Finland
- Education: Victoria University of Wellington (PhD, 2020)
- Occupations: Novelist; poet; journalist
- Children: 3
- Writing career
- Language: English; Swedish

Academic background
- Thesis: 'Sado' – A novel and Expressions of creativity and rhetorical allience: Ni-Vanuatu women's voices (2020)
- Doctoral advisor: Damien Wilkins; Teresia Teaiwa; Pala Molisa

Mikaela Nyman (born 1966) is a Finnish-New Zealand novelist, poet, journalist and editor. After an early career in journalism and non-fiction work, she published her first poetry collection (in Swedish) in 2019 and her first novel (in English) in 2020. The former resulted in her being nominated for the Nordic Council Literature Prize. Her work has been published in various anthologies and journals, and she was the co-editor of the first anthology of Vanuatu women's writing.

== Life and career ==
Born in Åland in Finland in 1966, Nyman's first language was Swedish. She is a granddaughter of Finnish writer Valdemar Nyman. She worked as a journalist early in her career and in 1995 wrote a biography of a Finnish woman who established a newspaper in Kasaï called Tankar: Hildegard Mangelus liv. In the late 1990s Nyman worked at the College of Labour Studies in Zimbabwe.

Nyman moved to New Zealand in 2002, and from 2004 to 2016 worked as a teacher of English to non-native speakers and worked in the international humanitarian and development space. During this time, she lived in Vanuatu for four years running an aid programme. In 2006 she published the non-fiction book Democratizing Indonesia: The challenges of civil society in the era of reformasi. In 2011, she gained a master's degree in creative writing with distinction from the International Institute of Modern Letters at Victoria University of Wellington, and followed this with a doctorate in creative writing in 2020.

In 2019, her first poetry collection, När vändkrets läggs mot vändkrets, dealing with the death of her sister and her challenges moving between two cultures, was published in Swedish. She was nominated for the Nordic Council Literature Prize in 2020 as a result of this work. In 2019 she also received an award for short story writing in the Ronald Hugh Morrieson Literary Awards.

Her first novel, Sado (2020), published by Victoria University Press, is set during and after the 2015 Cyclone Pam in Vanuatu. It formed part of her PhD thesis under her supervisors Damien Wilkins, Teresia Teaiwa and Pala Molisa. Reviewer Steve Walker for Stuff described the novel as "both timely and timeless" and said Nyman "forces us to understand rather than judge". It was published in March 2020 as New Zealand went into a COVID-19 lockdown.

Her work has been published in various anthologies and journals including Ko Aotearoa Tātou | We Are New Zealand (2020), Strong Words 2019: The Best of the Landfall Essay Competition and Sport. Together with co-editor Rebecca Tobo Olul-Hossen she edited Sista, Stanap Strong, the first anthology of Vanuatu women's writing, published by Victoria University Press in 2021, which she says has become part of the Vanuatu high school curriculum.

In 2021, Nyman was awarded a Creative New Zealand grant to work on a poetry collection in English and to offer community writing classes. In the same year, she was the visiting artist/writer in residence for Massey University, Palmerston North and Square Edge Community Arts Centre. As of 2023, she is based in New Plymouth and is the Taranaki regional representative for the New Zealand Society of Authors. In September 2023, she was awarded the Robert Burns Fellowship for 2024, and said she planned to use the time on the residency writing her second novel.

Nyman's first poetry collection written in English, The Anatomy of Sand, was published in 2025.

== Selected works ==
- Tankar: Hildegard Mangelus liv, Abacus (Swedish, non-fiction, 1995)
- Democratizing Indonesia: The challenges of civil society in the era of reformasi, NIAS Press (English, non-fiction, 2006)
- När vändkrets läggs mot vändkrets, Ellips förlag (Swedish, poetry collection, 2019)
- Sado, Victoria University Press (English, novel, 2020)
- Sista, Stanap Strong, Victoria University Press (English, co-editor of anthology, 2021)
- The Anatomy of Sand, Te Herenga Waka University Press (English, poetry collection, 2025)
