= Kate Duignan =

New Zealand writer

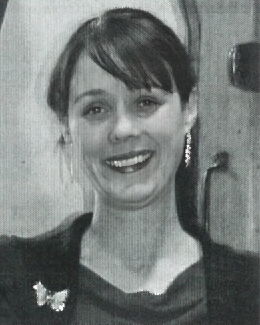
- Duignan in 2005
- Education: Victoria University of Wellington

Katherine Mary Duignan is a New Zealand novelist, short-story writer, reviewer and teacher.

== Background ==
She completed an MA in creative writing at Victoria University of Wellington in 2000, and a PhD in creative writing, also from VUW, in 2017. The critical component of her PhD explored narration in Gilead by Marilynne Robinson. Duignan now lives in Wellington with her partner and three children, and in 2018 is teaching fiction at the International Institute of Modern Letters at Victoria University.

== Works ==
Kate Duignan's debut novel Breakwater was published by Victoria University Press in 2001. Breakwater was reissued as part of the VUP Classics series in 2018. Her second novel, The New Ships was published in 2018. Duignan has published short fiction and poetry in Sport, Landfall and takahē.

Duignan reviews for Landfall and New Zealand Books.

== Fellowships and awards ==
The New Ships was long listed for the Acorn Foundation Fiction Prize in the 2019 Ockham Awards.

Duignan was awarded the Louis Johnson New Writers' Bursary in 2002. She held the Robert Burns Fellowship at the University of Otago in 2004. She was the Massey University Writer in Residence in 2006.
