= New Zealand literature =

New Zealand literature is literature, both oral and written, produced by the people of New Zealand. It often deals with New Zealand themes, people or places, is written predominantly in New Zealand English, and features Māori culture and the use of the Māori language. Before the arrival and settlement of Europeans in New Zealand in the 19th century, Māori culture had a strong oral tradition. Early European settlers wrote about their experiences travelling and exploring New Zealand. The concept of a "New Zealand literature", as distinct from English literature, did not originate until the 20th century, when authors began exploring themes of landscape, isolation, and the emerging New Zealand national identity. Māori writers became more prominent in the latter half of the 20th century, and Māori language and culture have become an increasingly important part of New Zealand literature.

New Zealand literature has developed into a major part of modern New Zealand culture through a growing readership, financial support and publicity for writers through literary awards and fellowships, and the development of literary journals and magazines. Many New Zealand writers have obtained local and international renown over the years, including the short-story writers Katherine Mansfield, Frank Sargeson and Jacquie Sturm, novelists Janet Frame, Patricia Grace, Witi Ihimaera, Maurice Gee, Keri Hulme and Eleanor Catton, poets James K. Baxter, Fleur Adcock, Selina Tusitala Marsh and Hone Tuwhare, children's authors Margaret Mahy and Joy Cowley, historians Michael King and Judith Binney, and playwright Roger Hall.

== History ==
=== Early works: pre-1870 ===
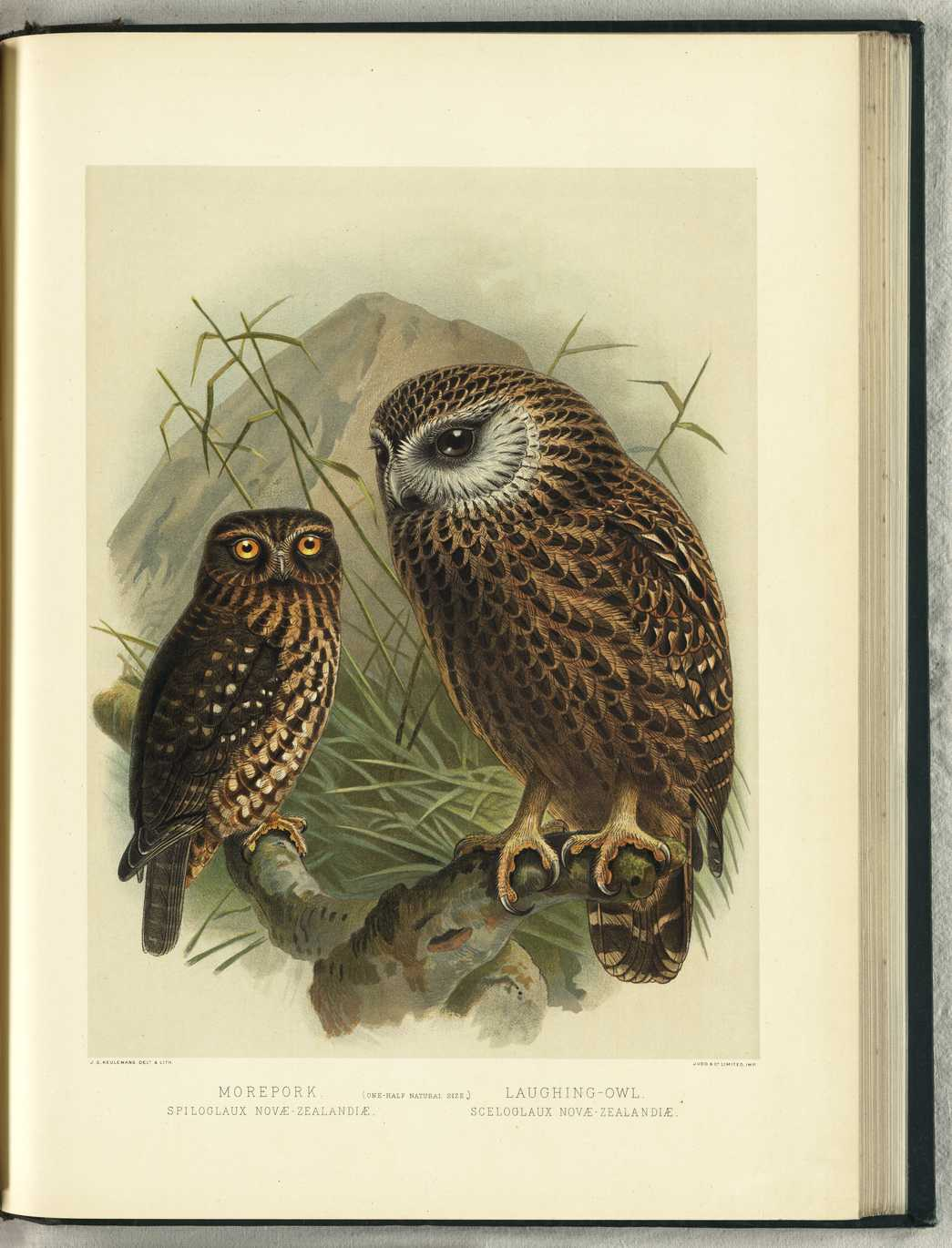
Illustrations of the morepork (left) and the extinct laughing owl (right) by John Gerrard Keulemans in Walter Buller's A History of the Birds of New Zealand. 2nd edition. Published 1888.

Polynesian settlers began arriving in New Zealand in the late 13th or early 14th century, and became known as Māori developing a distinct culture, including oral myths, legends, poetry, songs (waiata), and prayers. Public speaking on the marae, a communal and sacred gathering place, was (and remains) a particularly important part of Māori culture, and performance was a key part of the oral tradition; for example the karanga (a ceremonial call) as part of the pōwhiri (welcoming ceremony). The first book published in Māori language was in 1815 called A korao (korero) no New Zealand; or, the New Zealander's first book; being an attempt to compose some lessons for the instruction of the natives, printed in Sydney and written by Thomas Kendell in collaboration with Tuai, a young chief. Kendell, chief Hongi Hika, his nephew Waikato and linguist Samuel Lee developed a systematic written form of Māori language at Cambridge University in England in 1820. The first printing press arrived in New Zealand in 1834, and the first book printed in New Zealand was a Māori translation of a catechism in 1830 by William Yate, Ko Te Katikihama III.

As European settlers arrived in the country, they collected many Māori oral stories and poems, which were translated into English and published, such as Polynesian Mythology (1855) by George Grey and Maori Fairy Tales (1908) by Johannes Andersen. These stories, such as those about the god Māui, became widely known among the non-Māori population of New Zealand as well as the Māori people. A foundation was also laid for future Māori literature through Māori newspapers, Māori histories and literature associated with Māori religions, such as the Rātana and Pai Mārire movements.

In the 19th century, most Pākehā New Zealanders saw themselves as British, and most publications were written by British authors for a British audience. While the first uses of the term "New Zealand literature" appeared in the 1860s, it was used in an aspirational sense; it took time for a distinctly New Zealand literature to develop. Early New Zealand books were generally narratives of visits and travel to New Zealand, such as A Narrative of a Nine Months' Residence in New Zealand in 1827 (1832) by Augustus Earle or Station Life in New Zealand (1870) by Mary Anne Barker, or scientific works such as The New Zealanders Illustrated, a rare book by natural history artist George French Angas (1847) and A History of the Birds of New Zealand (1872) by ornithologist Walter Buller. Early expressions of New Zealand identity in literature included, notably, Old New Zealand by "a Pakeha Maori" (Frederick Edward Maning) and Erewhon by Samuel Butler, which drew on the author's experiences of living in Canterbury for five years.

=== Maoriland movement: 1870–1914 ===
In the late 19th and early 20th centuries, New Zealand nationalism began to emerge, with Pākehā writers adopting Māori stories and mythology. The term "Maoriland", proposed and often used as an alternative name for New Zealand around this time, became the centre of a literary movement in which colonialist writers were inspired by and adopted Māori traditions and legends. They were encouraged by a widespread belief among settlers that the Māori were a dying race who would not survive contact with Europeans. Māori themselves were not creators or proponents of Maoriland work.

For example, Thomas Bracken's book Musings in Maoriland included the poem "New Zealand Hymn", which later became the New Zealand national anthem under the title "God Defend New Zealand". Bracken and other poets such as Jessie Mackay and Arthur Henry Adams published poems about the Māori rangatira (chief) Te Rauparaha, while Alfred Grace, Jessie Weston, and others wrote fictional short stories and novels with Māori themes. New Zealand's fourth premier, Alfred Domett, wrote an epic poem, Ranolf and Amohia: A South-Sea Day-Dream (1872), which was over 100,000 words long and described a romance between a shipwrecked European man and a Māori woman. In 1901, William Satchell launched a magazine called The Maorilander, and the leftwing labour journal The Maoriland Worker ran from 1910 to 1924.

Colonial romances were popular, for example the works of Louisa Baker, Ellen Ellis, Edith Searle Grossmann and others, as were books about the New Zealand Wars, typified by The Rebel Chief: A Romance of New Zealand (1896), by Hume Nisbet. The popular English children's author G. A. Henty wrote Maori and Settler: A Tale of the New Zealand Wars (1890). Lady Barker wrote two books about life in New Zealand; Station Life in New Zealand (1870) and Station Amusements in New Zealand (1873), and her husband Frederick Broome wrote Poems from New Zealand (1868).

Maoriland culture was artificial and grounded in romance rather than reality; as academics Jane Stafford and Mark Williams have said, "Maoriland signifies an effort to deny the real presence of Maori in New Zealand in favour of a mythologised or decorative presence". For this reason, the term is now seen as archaic and colonial. By the time of the First World War, apart from a few individuals such as James Cowan and Rudall Hayward, the movement had largely ended. The term has been adopted in current times by the Māoriland Film Festival, an organisation in Ōtaki that promotes indigenous storytelling on screen.

=== Early 20th century: 1914–1939 ===
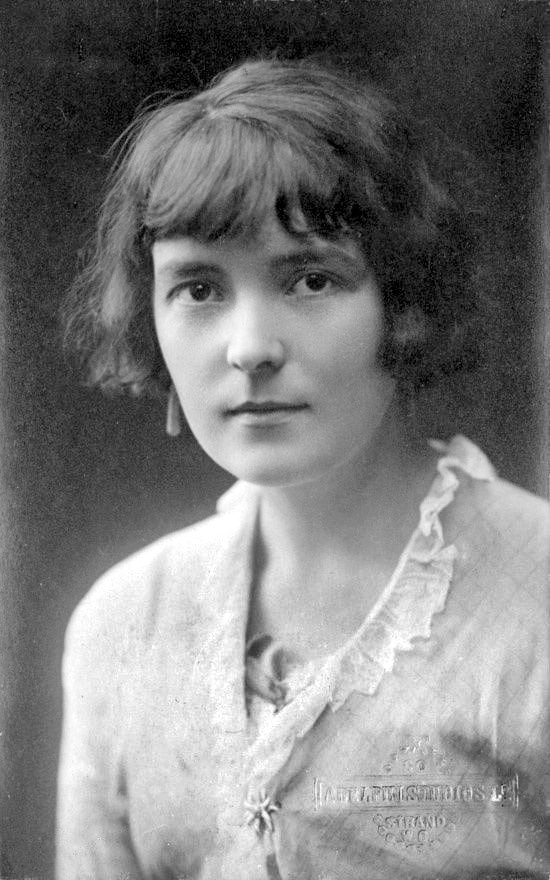
Katherine Mansfield

New Zealand literature continued to develop in the early 20th century, with notable writers including the poet Blanche Edith Baughan and novelist Jane Mander. New Zealand's most famous and influential writer in these years was the short-story writer Katherine Mansfield, who left New Zealand in 1908 and became one of the founders of literary modernism. She published three collections of stories in her lifetime: In a German Pension (1911), Bliss and Other Stories (1920) and The Garden Party and Other Stories (1922). She died in 1923, having (in the words of C. K. Stead) "laid the foundations for a reputation that has gone on to grow and influence the development of New Zealand literature ever since". Another notable early writer was Ursula Bethell, whose first poetry collection was published in 1929; her poetry is ascribed by the Oxford Companion to Twentieth-Century Literature in English as having "a plainness and spareness (as well as freshness of image) which distinguishes it from the more ornamented verse the country had previously produced". Edith Joan Lyttleton, who wrote as G.B. Lancaster, was New Zealand's most commercially successful writer in this period, known for her epic colonial romances. Herbert Guthrie-Smith's Tutira: The Story of a New Zealand Sheep Station (1921) was New Zealand's first significant environmentalist publication, and remains a classic of ecological writing; Michael King said in 2003 that it is "still the best example of this genre."

By the 1930s, New Zealand writing was starting to become established, assisted by the growth of universities and small publishers. Notable works included Man Alone (1939) by John Mulgan, an influential classic describing an isolated and alienated New Zealand man (which has itself become a cultural stereotype), influenced by the Great Depression, Show Down (1936) by Margaret Escott, and Frank Sargeson's short story collection, A Man and His Wife (1940). It was common at this time for writers, like Mansfield, to leave New Zealand and establish careers overseas: including Mulgan, Dan Davin, who joined the Oxford University Press, and journalist Geoffrey Cox. Ngaio Marsh, who divided her time between New Zealand and England, wrote detective fiction in the 1930s and was known as one of the "Queens of Crime". After the Depression, foreign theatre companies stopped touring New Zealand, which led to the establishment of a thriving amateur dramatic scene and playwrights such as Isobel Andrews achieving success through competitions held by the New Zealand Branch of the British Drama League.

Writing was still largely a Pākehā endeavour at this time; many Māori were living in rural areas and recovering from the loss of their land and language, depopulation, and educational challenges. Te Rangi Hīroa and Āpirana Ngata wrote non-fiction and collected Māori songs and chants for publication, but there were limited opportunities for Māori in written literature.

=== Second World War and subsequent years: 1939–1960 ===
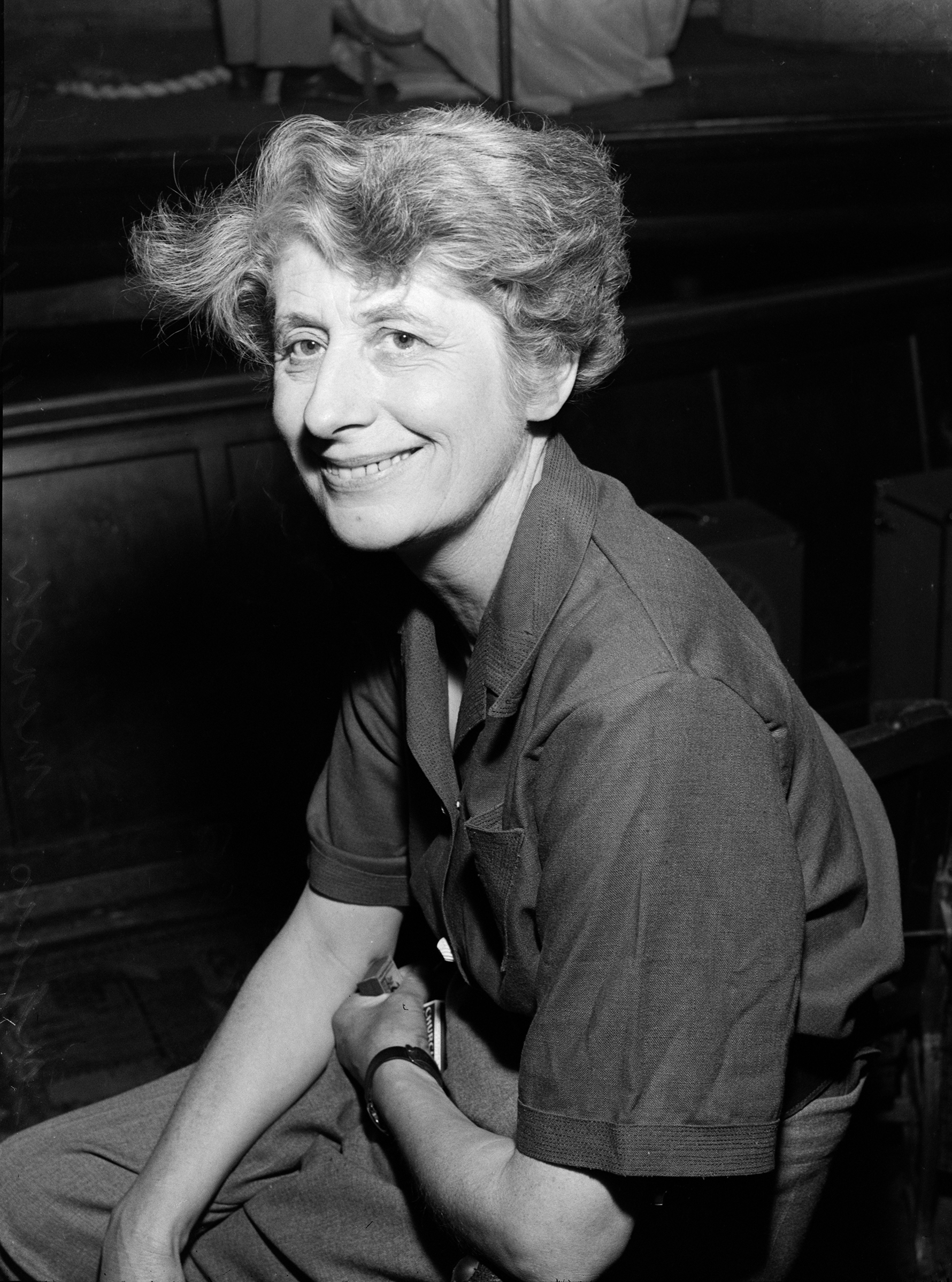
Ngaio Marsh in January 1949

From 1941, New Zealand writing gained an international audience through John Lehmann's periodical, Penguin New Writing. A local version was produced between 1942 and 1945. In 1945, Frank Sargeson edited an anthology of short stories by New Zealand writers, called Speaking for Ourselves, published by Caxton Press in New Zealand and by Reed & Harris in Melbourne, Australia. It received favourable reviews and writer Janet Frame later remembered how the stories in the collection "overwhelmed me by the fact of their belonging". In 1945, Allen Curnow published the anthology A Book of New Zealand Verse 1923–45, which marked the beginning of New Zealand literature's post-colonial and nationalist phase; Charles Brasch compared it to "a hard frost" that "killed off weeds, and promoted sound growth", and said it "set a standard not for poetry alone but for all the arts". Curnow and Brasch were just two of their generation of poets who began their careers with Caxton Press in the 1930s, and had a major influence on New Zealand poetry; others in the group were A. R. D. Fairburn, R. A. K. Mason and Denis Glover. Their poems can be contrasted with the work of South African-born Robin Hyde, who was excluded from this nationalist group, but whose novel The Godwits Fly (1938) was considered a New Zealand classic and continuously in print until the 1980s. In 1946, the New Zealand Literary Fund was established to provide subsidies and scholarships for local publishing and writing.

It was in the 1950s that, as historian and poet Keith Sinclair said, "New Zealand intellect and imagination came alive". By the 1950s there were a wide range of outlets for local literature, such as the influential journal Landfall (established in 1947), and the bilingual quarterly Te Ao Hou / The New World, which from 1952 to 1975 was a vehicle for Māori writers. Janet Frame's first novel, Owls Do Cry, was published in 1957, and she became the most acclaimed and well-known New Zealand novelist of the 20th century. Her work often drew on her experiences in psychiatric hospitals and featured stylistic experimentation and exploration of social conditions.

A new generation of young New Zealand poets eventually emerged, in particular the "Wellington Group", which rejected the nationalism of Curnow and the other Caxton poets. They argued that New Zealand poets could now focus on universal themes, rather than the New Zealand identity. James K. Baxter was the most famous and prolific of these poets, and is widely regarded today as the definitive New Zealand poet. Baxter was a controversial figure who was known for his incorporation of European myths into his New Zealand poems, his interest in Māori culture and language, his religious experiences, and the establishment of a commune at Jerusalem, New Zealand. Other members of the Wellington Group included Alistair Te Ariki Campbell and Fleur Adcock; the scholars C. K. Stead and Vincent O'Sullivan also became well known for their poetry around this time.

== Modern literature ==
=== Māori and Pasifika writing ===
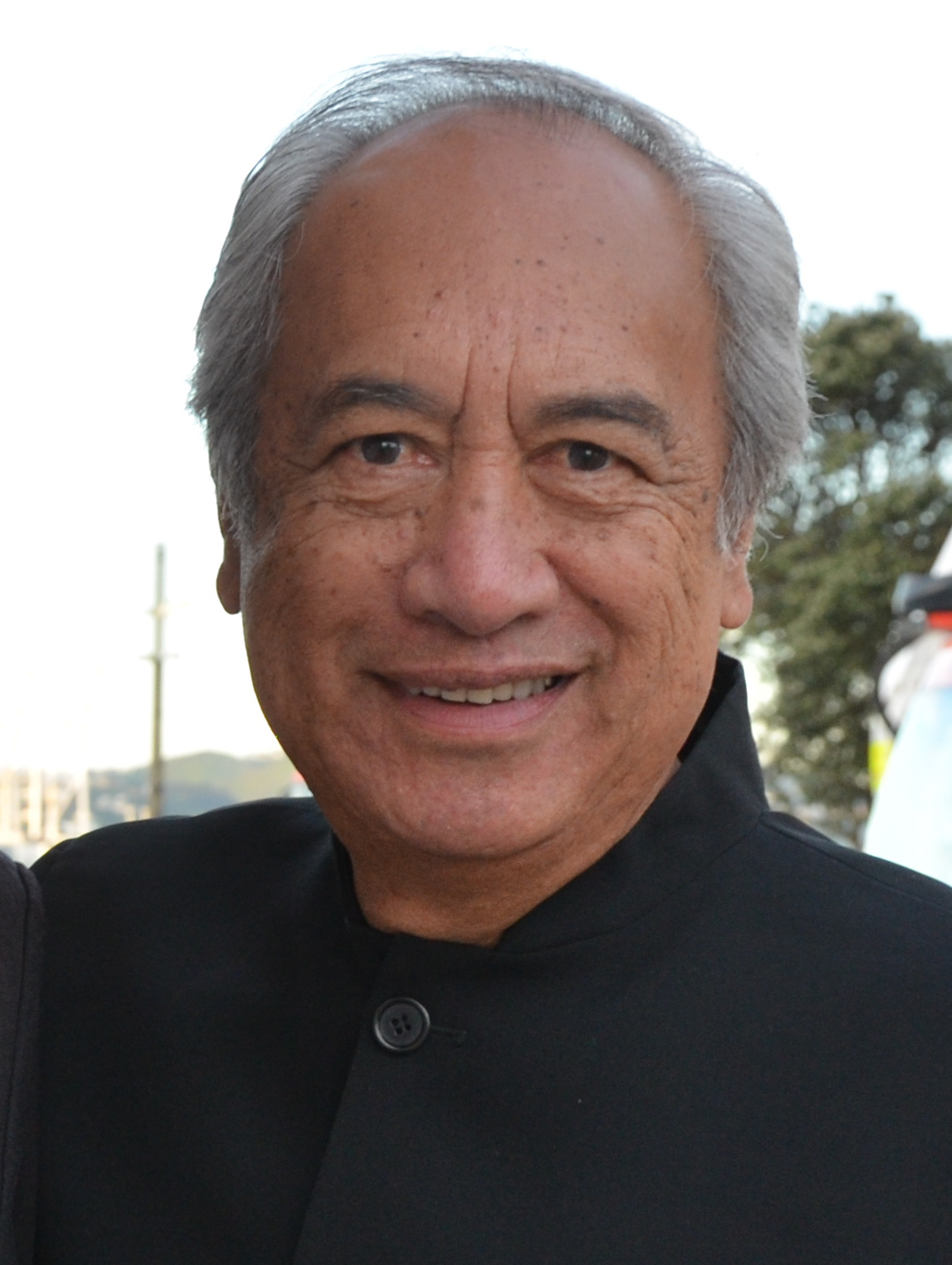
Witi Ihimaera at the premiere of his play, All My Sons, at the Circa Theatre, Wellington, on 11 November 2015

After the Second World War, Māori began to move into urban areas and had more educational opportunities available, which led to the emergence of Māori writing in English. In 1948 the debut novel The Cunninghams by Māori author David Ballantyne was published, although he was not promoted at that time as being a Māori author. In 1964, Hone Tuwhare, the first Māori poet to be distinguished for English poetry, published his first book, No Ordinary Sun, and in 1966 Jacquie Sturm became the first Māori writer to appear in a major anthology of New Zealand short stories. Authors like Sturm, Arapera Blank, Rowley Habib and Patricia Grace were published for the first time in Te Ao Hou and became widely known and respected. Witi Ihimaera published a collection of short stories (Pounamu, Pounamu) in 1972, followed by his first novel Tangi in 1973. His later novel Whale Rider (1987) was adapted into an internationally successful film in 2002. The notable anthology Into the World of Light (1982), edited by Ihimaera and Don Long, collected the work of 39 Māori writers. The editors observed that publishers in the mid-20th century were reluctant to publish books by Māori writers because of a belief that Māori "don't read books". Grace was the first Māori woman writer to publish a short story collection (Waiariki) in 1975 and has since received international awards and acclaim for her books for adults and children. Keri Hulme and Alan Duff were the best-known Māori writers to follow Grace and Ihimaera. Duff is known for the widely acclaimed Once Were Warriors (1990), which became a successful 1994 film and has never been out of print.

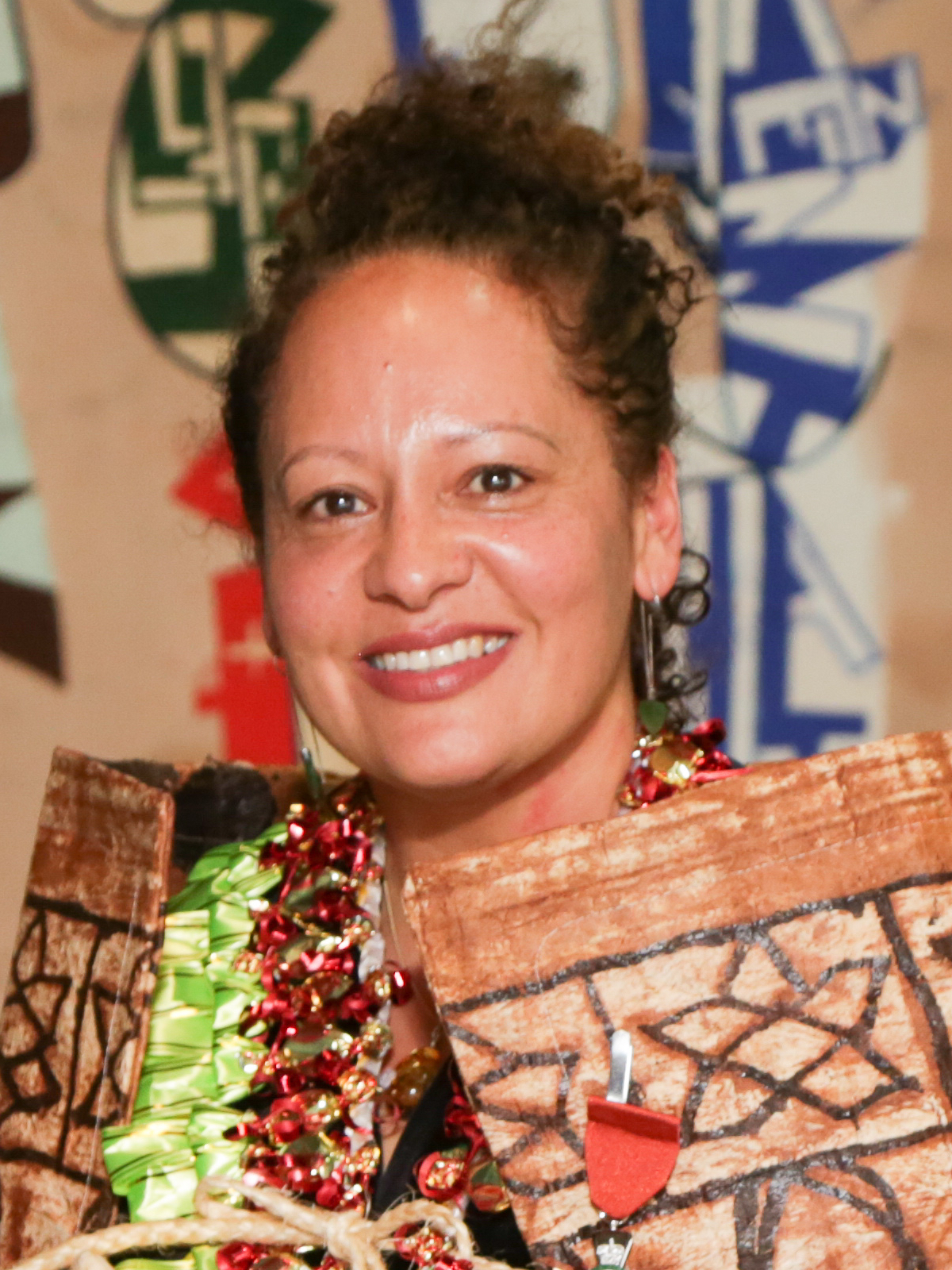
Karlo Mila MNZM

A 1985 article published in the literary journal Landfall by Miriama Evans noted recognised but "largely unpublished" Māori writers: Ani Hona (Te Aniwa Bisch) who received a Literary Fund grant in 1977, Rowley Habib who held the Katherine Mansfield Menton Fellowship in 1984, Bub Bridger who received a grant to attend the First International Feminist Book Fair (London) in 1984, and Bruce Stewart, who received grants from the Queen Elizabeth II Arts Council and the Ministry of Foreign Affairs to represent New Zealand at The Association for Commonwealth Literature and Language Studies Conference in Fiji in 1985. The Māori owned independent publisher Huia Publishers was established in 1991 by Robyn Bargh to platform Māori writers and perspectives.

Māori literature is closely connected to Pasifika literature. Notable Pasifika (Pacific Islander) writers with connections to New Zealand include Albert Wendt, Alistair Te Ariki Campbell, Karlo Mila, John Pule, Lani Wendt Young, Courtney Sina Meredith, Oscar Kightley and Selina Tusitala Marsh. Wendt is known for Sons for the Return Home (1973), which describes the experiences of a young Samoan man in New Zealand, and his later novels and short-story collections have formed the foundations for a Pasifika literature in English.

=== Fiction ===
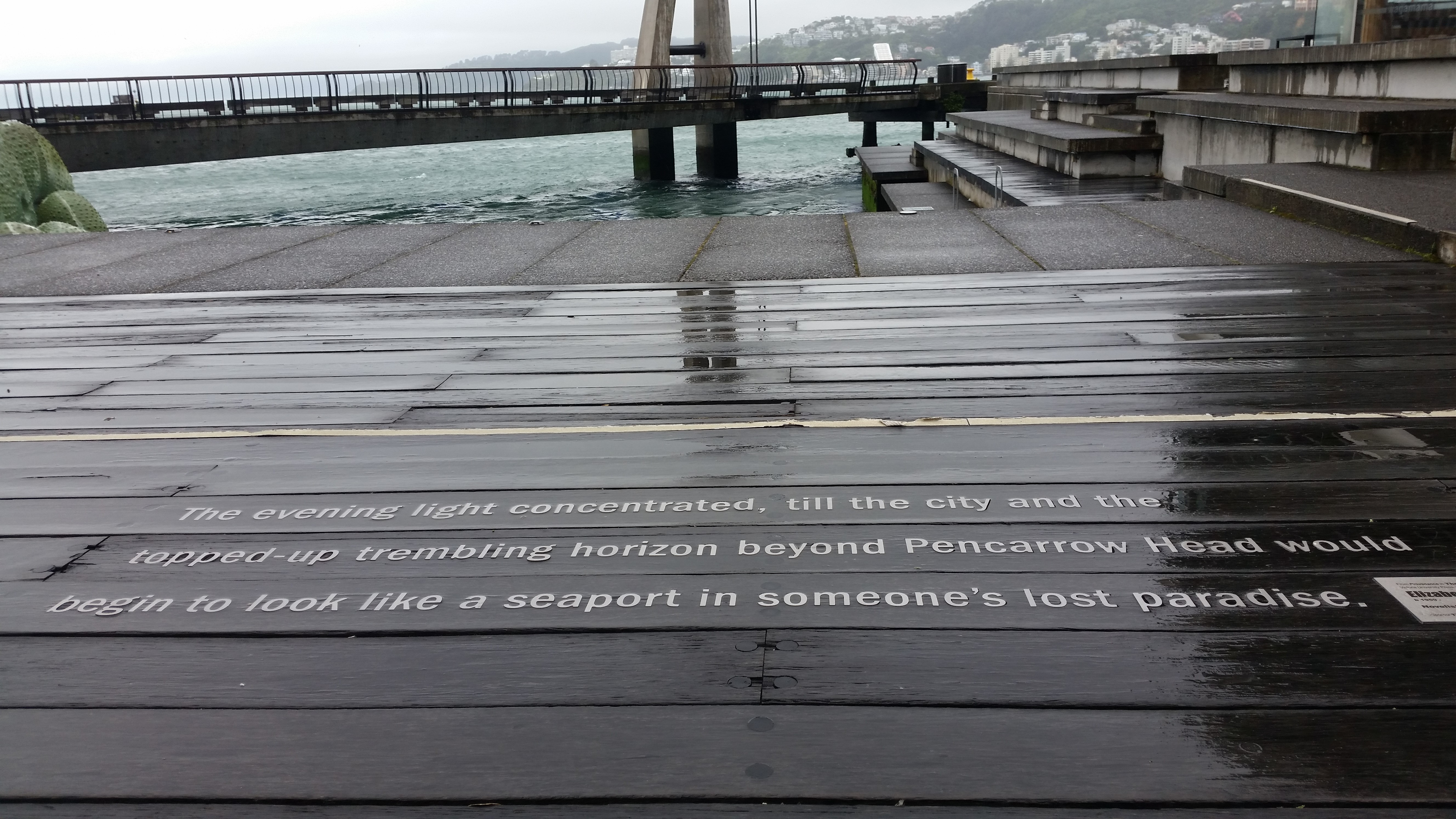
Words from New Zealand writer Elizabeth Knox as public art in Wellington

Notable writers in the post-Second World War period include Janet Frame, Owen Marshall, Ronald Hugh Morrieson, Bill Pearson, Sylvia Ashton-Warner and Essie Summers. In the 1960s, two young novelists, Maurice Shadbolt and Maurice Gee, both became well known for their traditional, socially realistic novels featuring New Zealand politics and history. Gee's Plumb trilogy continues to be widely read, and the first novel, Plumb (1979), was voted by literary experts in 2018 to be the best New Zealand novel of the last fifty years. The feminist movement in the 1970s and 1980s was the context for many women writers who emerged in that period, including Fiona Kidman, Marilyn Duckworth and Barbara Anderson, who wrote works exploring and challenging gender roles.

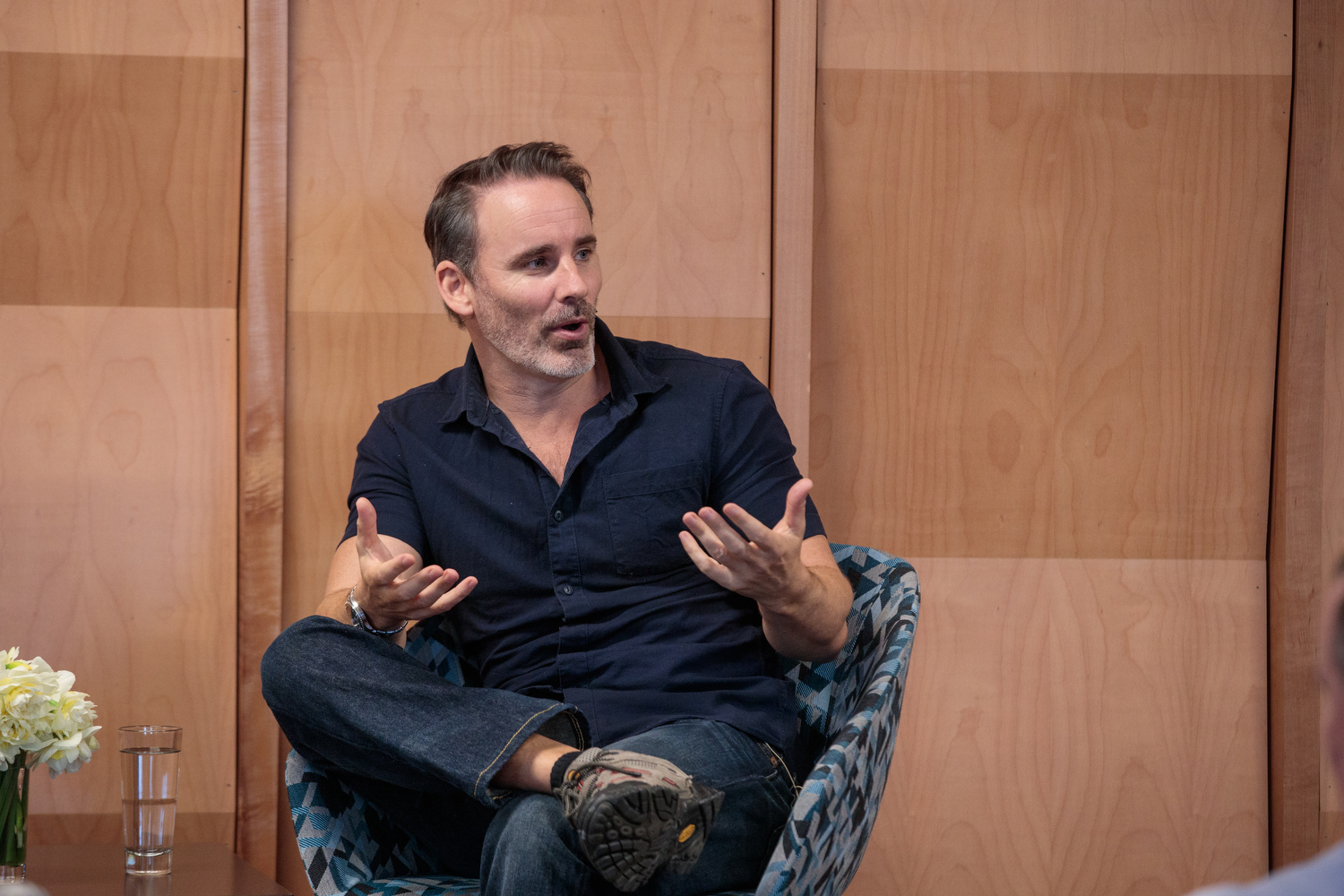
Crime novelist Paul Cleave is one of New Zealand's most successful crime writers

New Zealand fiction has grown exponentially since the mid-1970s, due to a growing readership locally and internationally, creative writing courses such as the International Institute of Modern Letters at Victoria University of Wellington, and financial support through literary awards and scholarships. Internationally successful New Zealand writers include Elizabeth Knox, known for The Vintner's Luck (1998) and her other diverse fiction, Emily Perkins, Fiona Farrell, Damien Wilkins, Nigel Cox and crime novelist Paul Cleave. Keri Hulme gained prominence when her novel, The Bone People, won the Booker Prize in 1985; she was the first New Zealander and the first debut novelist to win the prestigious award. Writer Lloyd Jones was shortlisted for his 2007 novel Mister Pip. In 2013, Eleanor Catton became the second New Zealand winner (as well as the youngest winner) of the award for her novel The Luminaries.

=== Non-fiction ===
New Zealand has a significant non-fiction tradition, with natural history, colonisation, Māori/Pākehā relations, childhood and identity being recurring themes. Important autobiographical works by New Zealand writers include trilogies by Frank Sargeson in the 1970s (Once is Enough, More than Enough and Never Enough!), Janet Frame in the 1980s (To the Is-land, An Angel at my Table and The Envoy from Mirror City), and C. K. Stead's two-part series South-west of Eden (2010) and You Have a Lot to Lose (2020).

Much of New Zealand's significant non-fiction is historical in nature. James Belich is known for his writing on the New Zealand Wars. Judith Binney is known for her biography of Te Kooti, Redemption Songs (1995) and her history of Tūhoe, Encircled Lands (2009). Linda Tuhiwai Smith's 1999 academic work Decolonizing Methodologies: Research and Indigenous Peoples has been an important contribution to Māori and indigenous research.

Historian Michael King began his career writing biographies about notable Māori people, including biographies of Te Puea Hērangi (1977) and Whina Cooper (1983). In the mid-1980s, aware of the importance of allowing Māori voices to speak, he wrote about what it meant to be a non-Māori New Zealander in Being Pākehā (1985), and published biographies of Frank Sargeson (1995) and Janet Frame (2000). His Penguin History of New Zealand was the most popular New Zealand book of 2004 and was named by The New Zealand Herald in 2009 as the best book of the preceding decade.

Recent essay collections by Asian New Zealand writers include All Who Live on Islands (2019) by Rose Lu and Small Bodies of Water (2021) by Nina Mingya Powles.

=== Children's and young adult literature ===
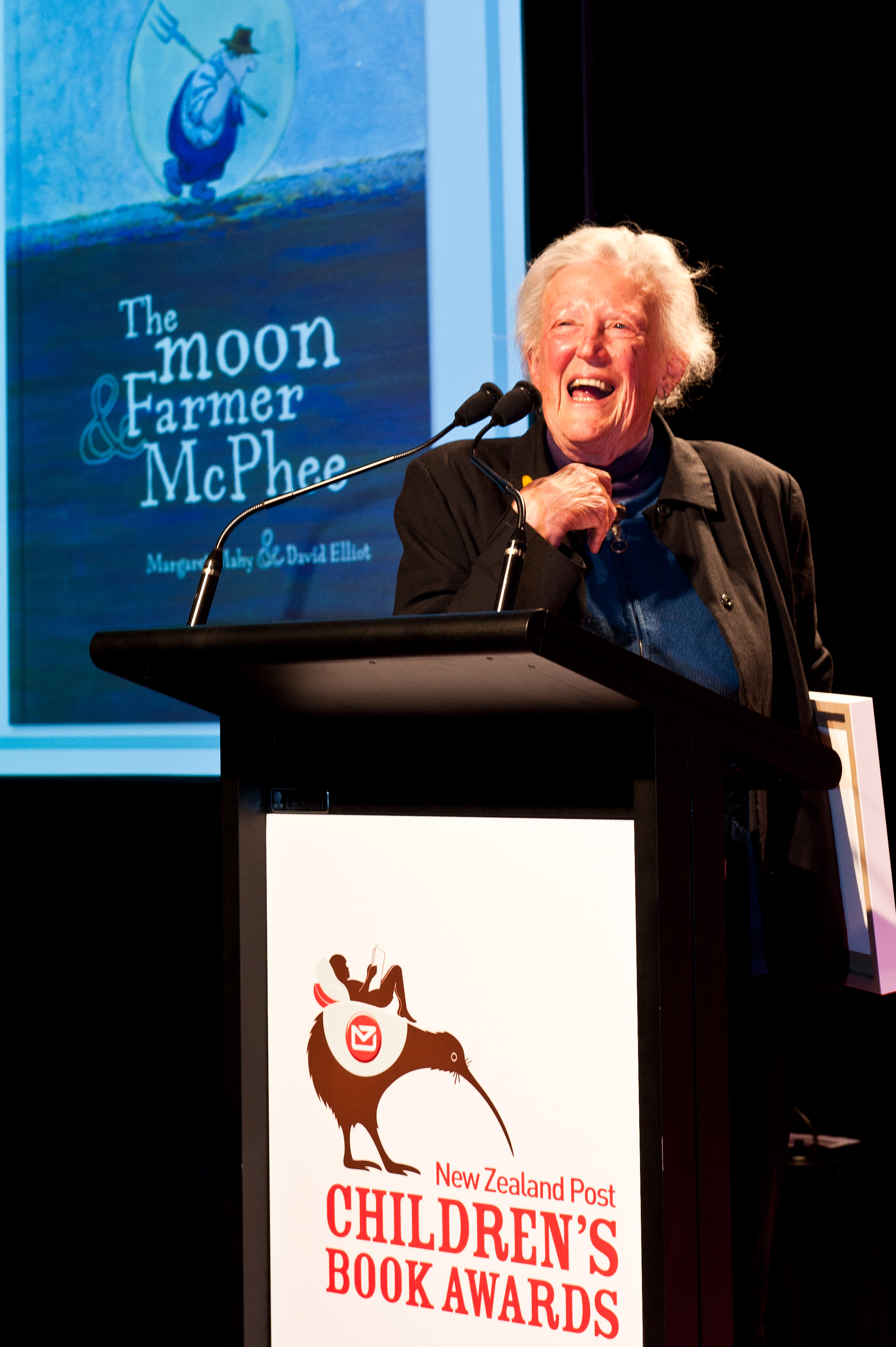
Margaret Mahy and her winning book The Moon & Farmer McPhee at the 2011 New Zealand Post Children's Book Awards

Margaret Mahy and Joy Cowley both had their first children's books published in 1969. Both became prolific and beloved authors, and have made a significant contribution to New Zealand children's literature. Mahy won the Carnegie Medal twice in the 1980s and in 2001 she won the Hans Christian Andersen Award, the world's most prestigious children's literature award. Cowley is internationally known for her children's educational books for children learning to read, as well as for her picture books, children's fiction, and young adult novels. Other well-known authors for young children include Lynley Dodd (known for her picture books featuring small dog Hairy Maclary), Patricia Grace, Kāterina Mataira (a leading Māori language author), Gavin Bishop (known particularly for illustration) and Peter Gossage (known for his picture book retellings of Māori myths and legends).

New Zealand has a strong tradition of fantasy and social realism in novels for children and young adults. Maurice Gee became well known for his science fiction and fantasy books, notably Under the Mountain (1979) and The Halfmen of O (1982). Other internationally well-known fantasy writers for children and young adults include Sherryl Jordan, Gaelyn Gordon, Elizabeth Knox, Barbara Else and David Hair. From the 1980s, young adult literature emerged in New Zealand, with authors like Gee, Jack Lasenby, Paula Boock, Kate De Goldi, Fleur Beale, and David Hill tackling serious and controversial topics for teenage readers. Tessa Duder's Alex quartet (1987–1992) explored issues of sexism, racism and personal trauma in 1950s and 1960s New Zealand. Bernard Beckett and Mandy Hager became well known in the 2000s for socially realistic and dystopian young adult fiction.

=== Poetry ===
James K. Baxter, Alistair Te Ariki Campbell, Fleur Adcock, C. K. Stead, and Vincent O'Sullivan became well known for their poetry in the 1950s and 1960s, with Baxter in particular dominating New Zealand poetry in the 1960s. Adcock is one of only two New Zealanders to have received the prestigious Queen's Gold Medal for Poetry (2006), with the other being Allen Curnow (who received the award in 1989). The 1970s and 1980s saw a shift away from New Zealand nationalism and the rise of confident young poets, often influenced by American writing and counterculture and writing about personal relationships; poets included Ian Wedde, Bill Manhire, Cilla McQueen, Elizabeth Smither, Sam Hunt and Murray Edmond. Cilla McQueen and Hunt are both well known for their performance poetry. In 1985, Ian Wedde and Harvey McQueen edited and published a new edition of The Penguin Book of New Zealand Verse, which included poetry in Māori, a first for a New Zealand poetry anthology. Since then, New Zealand poetry has become more diverse and more difficult to characterise by theme.

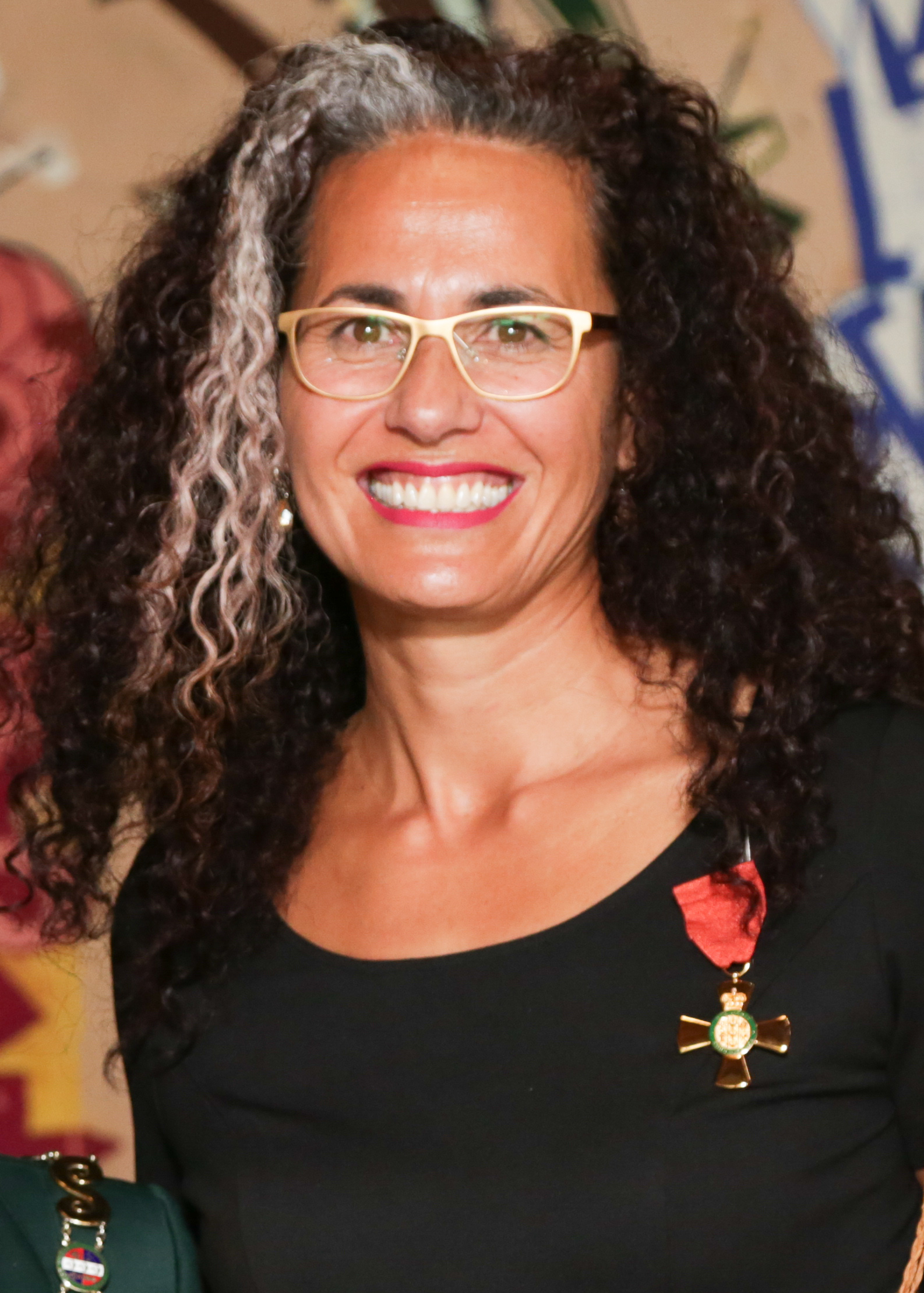
Selina Tusitala Marsh ONZM

The National Library of New Zealand appoints a New Zealand Poet Laureate. Recent laureates include Selina Tusitala Marsh (2017–2019), David Eggleton (2019–2022) and Chris Tse (2022–2025). Other notable contemporary poets include Robert Sullivan, known for his first collection Jazz Waiata (1990) and more recent work including the collection Shout Ha! to the Sky (2010), Hera Lindsay Bird, known for her popular autobiographical and provocative work, and Karlo Mila, whose work addresses both personal and political issues such as concerns of identity, migration, and community, some of which is included in the collections Dream Fish Floating (2006) and Goddess Muscle (2020).

=== Playwriting ===
The 1960s saw significant developments in New Zealand playwriting, and the country's first professional theatre, the Downstage Theatre, opened in Wellington in 1964. Playmarket was also founded in 1973 to represent and market New Zealand playwrights and their work. Bruce Mason was the country's first professional playwright. His one-person show The End of the Golden Weather (1962), about a boy's loss of innocence in Depression-era New Zealand, was performed widely throughout New Zealand, and he explored Māori themes and the disintegration of Māori identity in The Pohutakawa Tree (1960) and Awatea (1969). Mervyn Thompson, a controversial playwright, wrote plays with autobiographical and political elements such as O Temperance! (1974). In 1976, a group of Downstage actors left to found the Circa Theatre, and produced Glide Time by Roger Hall as one of their first productions. Hall became New Zealand's most commercially successful playwright, and Glide Time became a New Zealand icon and was turned into a TV sitcom. Greg McGee's Foreskin's Lament (1981), about small-town rugby culture in New Zealand, likewise achieved iconic status.

Drama further developed in the 1980s and 1990s with new playwrights finding success, including Renée, Stuart Hoar, Hone Kouka and Briar Grace-Smith. Jean Betts's feminist play Ophelia Thinks Harder (1993) was still widely performed in New Zealand and overseas as of 2014, and may be the most widely performed New Zealand play. The collective Pacific Underground developed the groundbreaking play Fresh off the Boat (1993), written by Oscar Kightley and Simon Small, which was praised for its portrayal of Samoan life in New Zealand. New Zealand also has a tradition of independent theatre with companies creating original plays and collective works, including the Red Mole theatre group (1970s–2002), Barbarian Productions in Wellington (led by Jo Randerson), the Christchurch Free Theatre, the work of poet Murray Edmond with the Living Theatre Troupe, and the early work of Paul Maunder with the Amamus Theatre.

== Literary awards ==
In the early 20th century, literary competitions in New Zealand were hosted by newspapers and magazines, and the university colleges hosted some literary prizes such as the Macmillan Brown Prize. In the 1940s the government-run New Zealand Literary Fund began to offer state-sponsored literary prizes in a wide range of genres. The first private literary award was the biennial Katherine Mansfield Memorial Award, a short-story competition organised by the New Zealand Women Writers' Society and funded by the Bank of New Zealand, which became available in 1959; this award ran until 2015. The Ngaio Marsh Awards are awarded annually for the best New Zealand mystery, crime and thriller fiction writing.

As of 2021, the annual Ockham New Zealand Book Awards offer five principal prizes: fiction (currently known as the Jann Medlicott Acorn Prize for Fiction), general non-fiction (sponsored by Royal Society Te Apārangi), illustrated non-fiction, poetry (currently known as the Mary and Peter Biggs Award for Poetry) and Te Mūrau o te Tuhi Māori Language Award for books written entirely in te reo (Māori language). These annual awards have changed names several times due to different sponsors over the years, and were created in 1996 from the amalgamation of the Montana Book Awards (previously the Goodman Fielder Wattie Awards, running from 1968 to 1995) and the government-run New Zealand Book Awards (running from 1976 to 1995). The New Zealand Book Awards for Children and Young Adults are also presented annually to recognise excellence in literature for children and young adults. These awards began in 1982 and have had several name changes due to different sponsors over the years.

A number of literary fellowships are available in New Zealand. These fellowships give writers the opportunity to stay at a particular place with their accommodation and other costs funded. The first fellowship was the Robert Burns Fellowship, set up anonymously (although widely attributed to Charles Brasch) at the University of Otago in 1958. Another prestigious fellowship is the Katherine Mansfield Menton Fellowship, founded by a trust in 1970, which enables writers to spend at least three months in Menton, France, where Katherine Mansfield lived and wrote.

The Prime Minister's Awards for Literary Achievement were established in 2003 and are awarded annually to writers who have made a significant contribution to New Zealand literature.

== Literary festivals ==
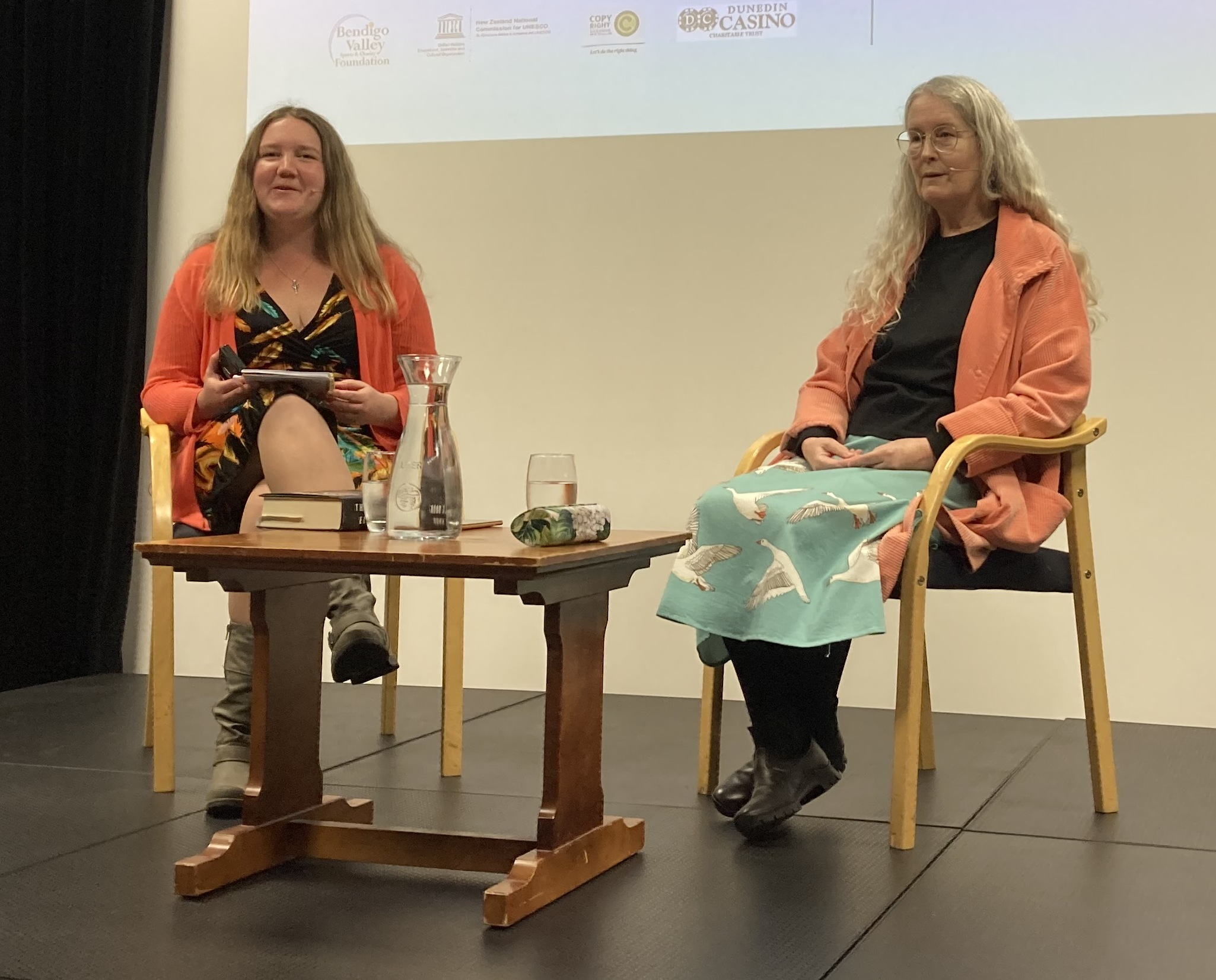
Hannah Parry and Elizabeth Knox at the Dunedin Writers and Readers Festival 2021

There are a number of regular literary festivals held in different locations across New Zealand. Some are stand-alone and some are part of arts festivals. Stand-alone festivals include Going West (established in 1996), WORD Christchurch (established in 1997), the Auckland Writers Festival (established in 1999), the Dunedin Writers and Readers Festival (established in 2014), the Verb Writers Festival & LitCrawl (established in 2014), the Hokianga Book Festival and the Whanganui Literary Festival. The small town of Featherston is one of 22 recognised book towns in the world and holds a Featherston Booktown event annually in May. Former literary festivals include New Zealand Book Month, which ran from 2006 to 2014. The Verb festival in Wellington in 2019 held a panel event where three out of five panellists were writers of Chinese heritage, Rosabel Tan, Gregory Kan and Chen Chen; writer Nina Mingya Powles said she thought this was the first time that had happened in New Zealand and that this felt like a "groundbreaking moment" for Chinese New Zealand writers.

Other literary events include the writers' section of the Hamilton Gardens Summer Festival (held in February and March), the Verb Wellington writers and readers programme at the New Zealand Festival (held every two years in March), the Aspiring Conversations with authors at the Festival of Colour (held in April in Wānaka), the New Zealand Mountain Film & Book Festival focusing on adventurous sports and lifestyles (held every two years in Queenstown in July), the readers and writers' week at the Taranaki Arts Festival (held every two years in July and August), the readers and writers programme at the Tauranga Arts Festival (held every two years in October), the Hawke's Bay Readers and Writers Festival (held annually in conjunction with the Hawke's Bay Arts Festival, usually in mid to late October) and the Nelson Arts Festival Readers and Writers week (held annually in October). In 2020 and 2021 many literary festivals were disrupted or cancelled due to the COVID-19 pandemic.

== Literary journals and periodicals ==
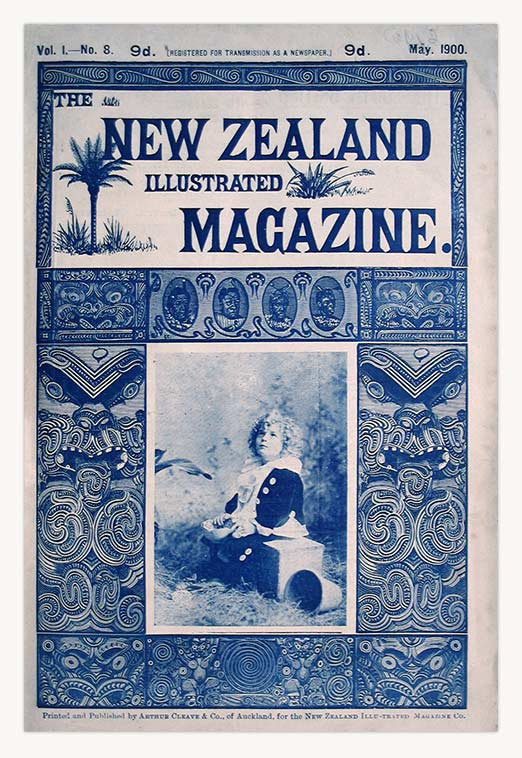
Cover of The New Zealand Illustrated Magazine in May 1900, a short-lived periodical (1899–1905)

Early New Zealand literary journals included The Triad (founded by Charles Nalder Baeyertz in 1893 and closed in 1926), The New Zealand Illustrated Magazine (founded in Auckland in 1899 and closed in 1905) and Art in New Zealand (founded by Charles Allan Marris in 1928 and closed in 1946). The short-lived magazine Phoenix, published in 1932 by students at the University of Auckland and edited by James Bertram and R. A. K. Mason, was an early outlet for New Zealand nationalist writers such as Brasch and Curnow. Left-wing artist Kennaway Henderson founded the fortnightly magazine Tomorrow in 1934, which was influential in shaping New Zealand nationalist literature and literary criticisms, but was shut down by the government as subversive in 1940. Other early journals and magazines included New Zealand Mercury (a poetry magazine established by Helen Langford, 1933 to 1936), Oriflamme and Sirocco (published in 1933 by students of Canterbury University College, including Denis Glover), Book (featuring Caxton Press writers and edited by Anton Vogt, 1942 to 1947) and the New Zealand Railways Magazine (published by the Railway Department from 1926 to 1940).

In 1947, Caxton Press began publishing the quarterly journal Landfall, edited by Charles Brasch; it is still published today on a twice-yearly basis. The journal has been described by Peter Simpson as "the most important and long-lasting journal in New Zealand's literature". Brasch's successor as editor, Robin Dudding, left Landfall in 1972 to set up a competing journal called Islands, and some of Landfall's key contributors switched their allegiance to this new journal; Landfall did not recover its status as the leading literary journal of New Zealand until the editorship of David Dowling in the early 1980s. Other important literary journals in New Zealand include Sport, founded by Fergus Barrowman in 1988, takahē, a Christchurch journal founded in 1989 focussing on short stories, poetry, and art, and Poetry New Zealand, which has published local and overseas work since 1993.

The magazine New Zealand Listener was founded by the government in 1939 to publish radio listings, but extended its brief to cover current affairs, opinion, and literary works. Among the writers featured in the magazine over the years were Maurice Duggan, Noel Hilliard, Keith Sinclair, Maurice Shadbolt, Fiona Kidman, and Joy Cowley, and poets James K. Baxter, Allen Curnow, Ruth Gilbert, and Ruth France. In 1990, the magazine was privatised and subsequently became more of a lifestyle magazine, although it continues to have a focus on literary works. Another important government-founded magazine was Te Ao Hou / The New World, a quarterly magazine published in both English and Māori from 1952 to 1975 by the Māori Affairs Department; it was the first national magazine for Māori. The New Zealand School Journal was founded by the New Zealand Department of Education in 1907 and has been published by a private firm since 2013; since the 1940s it been known for the high quality of its children's literature.

== See also ==
- Māori poetry
- New Zealand Writers Guild
- List of New Zealand writers
- List of New Zealand women writers

== Bibliography ==
- Brasch, Charles (1980). Indirections: A Memoir 1909–1947. Wellington, NZ: Oxford University Press. ISBN 0-19-558050-8. Archived from the original on 3 November 2020.
- King, Michael (2003). The Penguin History of New Zealand. Auckland, NZ: Penguin Group (NZ). ISBN 978-1-7422-8826-0.
- Stafford, Jane; Williams, Mark (2006). Maoriland: New Zealand Literature 1872-1914. Wellington, NZ: Victoria University Press. ISBN 978-0-8647-3522-5.
- Stafford, Jane; Williams, Mark, eds. (2012). Anthology of New Zealand literature. Auckland, NZ: Auckland University Press. ISBN 9781869405892.
