= Ashleigh Young =

New Zealand poet, essayist, editor and teacher

Ashleigh Young (born 1983) is a poet, essayist, editor and creative writing teacher. She received the Windham-Campbell Literature Prize in 2017 for her second book, a collection of personal essays titled Can You Tolerate This? which also won the Royal Society Te Apārangi Award for General Non-Fiction. She lives in Wellington, New Zealand.

== Life ==
Young was born in 1983 in Te Kūiti and grew up there and in Wellington. Writing featured in her life from childhood, when she wrote and illustrated a series of small books, started a magazine, created her own bedroom library, and (with her brothers) made movies with a borrowed video camera.

She lived in London for several years and also worked for a year as director of the Katherine Mansfield House and Garden in Wellington, a house in which "you could step inside and imagine yourself to be a child in another century.

She lists some of her favourite New Zealand writers and poets as Pip Adam, Hera Lindsay Bird, James Brown, Jenny Bornholdt, Geoff Cochrane and Bill Manhire, as well as newer voices such as Sam Duckor-Jones and Tayi Tibble.

She lives in Wellington, New Zealand.

== Work ==
In 2009, Young was awarded an MA in creative writing from the International Institute of Modern Letters at Victoria University of Wellington.

She won the 2009 Adam Foundation Prize in Creative Writing for her MA portfolio (which included the essays later to be published in Can You Tolerate This?) and the 2009 Landfall Essay Competition. In 2015 she was a finalist for the Sarah Broom Poetry Prize and she was one of the winners of the 2016 Surrey Hotel Steve Braunias Memorial Writers Residency in Association with The Spinoff Award.

She took writing workshops with Kate De Goldi and Harry Ricketts and began writing chapter books for Learning Media, which she credits with teaching her editing skills. Her poetry and essays have been widely published in print and online journals, including Tell You What: Great New Zealand Nonfiction, Five Dials (UK) and The Griffith Review (Australia).

The collection of essays in her second book, Can You Tolerate This?, have been described as "wry, confessional, understated and often hilarious". The book won the 2017 Windham-Campbell Prize from Yale University, and was described by the judges as "honest, insightful prose" that "offers intimate and playful glimpses of coming of age in small-town New Zealand". Young was the first New Zealander to win this prize. Recipients are not advised that they are being considered for the award, and she had no prior warning before receiving an email to say she had won. She collected her prize at the Windham Campbell Festival at Yale in September 2017. Can You Tolerate This? also won the Royal Society Te Apārangi Award for General Non-Fiction 2017.

In 2018, Young was made an Honorary Literary Fellow in the New Zealand Society of Authors' Waitangi Day Honours.

She has been invited to appear in a number of literary festivals. In 2016, she took part in the Ruapehu Festival, including a session with James Brown and Bill Nelson on Poets Who Cycle. In 2017, she appeared at the Auckland Writers Festival and the Dunedin Writers & Readers Festival. In 2018, she appeared at the New Zealand Festival Writers & Readers Week, the Sydney Writers Festival, the Bathurst Writers’ & Readers’ Festival, Adelaide Writers' Week and the Cheltenham Literature Festival.

She is an editor at Victoria University Press. She previously co-taught a Science Writing Workshop at Victoria University with Rebecca Priestley. In 2019 she took on the role of poetry editor at The Spinoff Review of Books.

== Bibliography ==
=== Poetry and essay collections ===
- —— (2012). Magnificent Moon. VUP. ISBN 9780864737632. (Poetry)
- —— (2016). Can You Tolerate This?. VUP. ISBN 9781776560769. (Essays)
- —— (2019). How I Get Ready. VUP. ISBN 9781776562367. (Poetry)

=== Poems and essays ===
- "You Are Now Entering" (Pantograph Punch, 2012) (Po)
- "A final binding ruling on the correct spelling of the word eh" (The Spinoff, 2 Dec 2016) (Essay)

== Awards ==
- Landfall Essay Competition, 2009
- Macmillan Brown Prize for Writers, 2009
- Adam Foundation Prize in Creative Writing, 2009
- Sarah Broom Poetry Prize, 2015 (finalist)
- Royal Society Te Apārangi Award for General Non-Fiction, 2017: Can You Tolerate This?
- Windham-Campbell Prize, 2017: Can You Tolerate This?
- Rathbones Folio Prize, 2019 (shortlist)
