= Gigi Fenster =

New Zealand writer, creative writing teacher and law lecturer

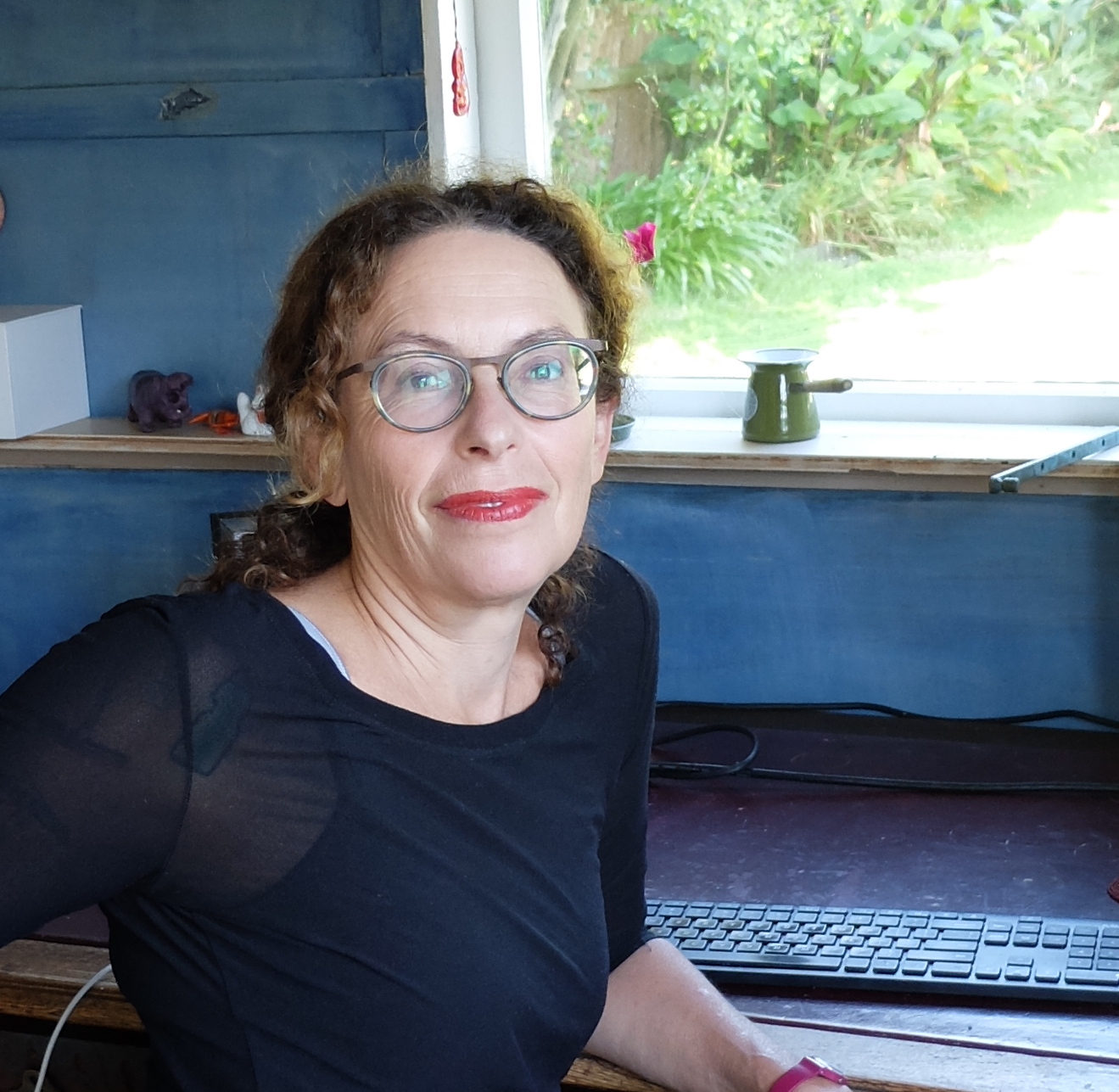
- Fenster in 2022
- Born: 1963 or 1964 (age 60–61)
- Occupation: Novelist
- Education: PhD, Victoria University of Wellington
- Notable works: A Good Winter (2021)

Website
- gigi-fenster.com

Giovanna (Gigi) Fenster (born 1963/64) is a South African-born New Zealand author, creative writing teacher, and law lecturer.

== Life ==
Fenster was born in South Africa to a Jewish family. Her father was a psychiatrist. One of five children, she describes her home as a "lively, entertaining, emotionally very generous household". She studied law in South Africa: most of her legal career has been in the construction industry, as an advisor and trainer on issues of construction law. After having two children, her concerns about raising them in a society with high levels of violence prompted her to move in 2001 to Wellington, New Zealand, where she became a legal policy analyst at the Commerce Commission.

Fenster still teaches contract law, as well as Creative Writing at Massey University in Wellington. She was one of the founders of the Write Where You Are collective, which supports writing in prisons, and teaches creative writing in Rimutaka Prison.

Fenster has two daughters, and in 2015 moved from Wellington to Ōtaki on New Zealand's Kāpiti Coast, where she lives with her partner.

== Literary career ==
Fenster's writing career began with the encouragement of her younger sister, novelist Rahla Xenopoulos, who had just published her first book. Joining a writing group was for Fenster an antidote to the loneliness she felt after her move to New Zealand. She went on to do a master's degree in creative writing at the International Institute of Modern Letters at Victoria University of Wellington.

Fenster's first novel, The Intentions Book, was published by Victoria University Press in 2012, and was shortlisted in the Fiction category of the 2013 New Zealand Post Book Awards, and longlisted for the International IMPAC Dublin Literary Award and the Commonwealth Book Prize. In 2016 she was awarded a PhD in creative writing from Victoria University of Wellington, supervised by Damien Wilkins. Her PhD thesis was published as a work of creative non-fiction under the title Feverish: A Memoir by Victoria University Press in 2018: it explored creativity, fever, and identity.

Fenster's third novel, psychological thriller A Good Winter, was a manuscript she had written in 2016 but abandoned for years "because it refused to go where I wanted it to go." Encouraged by a friend, poet Mary Macpherson, she submitted it for the 2020 Michael Gifkins Prize for an Unpublished Novel, and won. The prize included a contract for world rights with Australian publisher Text Publishing, as well as a NZ$10,000 advance. A Good Winter was published in September 2021.

A Good Winter's protagonist, Olga, is an unreliable narrator and an unlikeable, bitter, and uncompromising character. When starting the novel, Fenster relates that she took the advice "First you find your characters. Then you put them up a tree. Then you throw stones at them", but the character of Olga was "throwing stones right back". As a portrait of a troubled, obsessed mind, Fenster said she wanted readers to feel "worried, anxious, incredibly tense…to both dread and look forward to the end." In March 2022 A Good Winter was one of four novels shortlisted for the Jann Medlicott Acorn Prize for Fiction in the Ockham New Zealand Book Awards, and convenor of judges Rob Kidd described it as "an unnerving and absorbing reading experience as the darkness closes in."

== Works ==
- "Leaving Morris" (Sport 37, Winter 2009)
- "Buttons" (The International Literary Quarterly 16, 2011)
- "Preview" (Hue & Cry 6, 2012).
- Fenster, Gigi (2012). The Intentions Book. Wellington: Victoria University Press. ISBN 978-0-86473-879-0. OCLC 925478458.
- Fenster, Gigi (2018). Feverish : a memoir. Wellington: Victoria University Press. ISBN 978-1-77656-148-3. OCLC 1035556476.
- Fenster, Gigi (2021). A Good Winter. Melbourne: Text Publishing. ISBN 978-1-922458-13-1. OCLC 1257074424.
