= Australasian literature =

Australasian literature is an umbrella term for the literary production of Australasian countries:

- Australian literature
- New Zealand literature
