= Anne Shelton =

Anne or Ann Shelton may refer to:

- Anne Shelton (singer) (1923–1994), British singer
- Anne Shelton (courtier) (1475–1556), English Courtier, aunt of Queen Anne Boleyn
- Ann Shelton (photographer) (born 1967), New Zealand photographer
