= Teherenui Koteka =

Cook Islander poet

Teherenui Koteka (born c. 1999) is a Cook Islands playwright and poet. She is a member of Pasifika and Māori arts collective Maranga Mai.

Koteka was born on Rarotonga and educated at Victoria University of Wellington, graduating with a degree in Theatre, Film, and Media Studies. In 2022 she completed a Masters in Creative Writing at the International Institute of Modern Letters.

In 2021 she presented a series of four plays in the Cook Islands titled "The Big Fkn Spectacle". In November 2022 she presented her radio play Te Maunga, Te Toa e Manakia as part of a five-part audiodrama series with Maranga Mai.
