= Anna Taylor (writer) =

New Zealand author (born 1982)

- Born: Anna Horsley; 1982 (age 43–44); New Zealand

Anna Taylor (born 1982) is an author from New Zealand.

== Background ==
Taylor was born in 1982. In 2006 she received her MA in creative writing at the Victoria University of Wellington. Taylor lives in Wellington, New Zealand.

== Career ==
Until 2009, Taylor published under the name Anna Horsley. Taylor is her mother's surname.

Taylor's first collection of short stories, Relief, was published in 2009 by Victoria University Press.

Fiction by Taylor been published in a number of anthologies and literary journals including The Penguin Book of Contemporary New Zealand Short Stories, Sport, Turbine, and Hue&Cry.

Taylor is currently a creative writing tutor at Whitireia New Zealand.

== Awards ==
Relief won the 2010 NZSA Hubert Church Best First Book Award at the New Zealand Post Book Awards.

While at the International Institute of Modern Letters at Victoria University of Wellington, Taylor won the 2006 Adam Foundation Prize in Creative Writing for the manuscript Going Under: Stories (which was later published as Relief).

In 2009 she received the Todd New Writer's Bursary from Creative New Zealand.

In 2012 she received the Grimshaw Sargeson Fellowship with David Lyndon Brown.
