= Anthony Lapwood =

New Zealand writer (born 1983)

- Born: 1983 (age 42–43); Auckland, New Zealand
- Education: International Institute of Modern Letters (MA, 2018)
- Occupation: Short story writer
- Notable work: Home Theatre (2022)
- Awards: Hubert Church Prize for Fiction
- Website: Official website

Anthony Lapwood (born 1983) is a New Zealand short story writer. His debut collection Home Theatre, published in 2022, received the Hubert Church Prize for Fiction at the 2023 Ockham New Zealand Book Awards.

== Early life and education ==
Lapwood was born in Auckland in 1983. He grew up in Tauranga and attended Tauranga Boys' College. He is part of the iwi (tribes) of Ngāti Ranginui, Ngāi Te Rangi and Ngāti Whakaue. He also has Pākehā ancestry.

He graduated from Victoria University of Wellington with a Bachelor of Arts in English literature and film in 2011, followed by a Master of Arts degree in creative writing (with distinction) from the International Institute of Modern Letters, graduating in 2018.

== Writing ==
Lapwood's first publication was the short story "Jobs for Dreamers", in the magazine Turbine | Kapohau in 2017. Since then his stories have been published widely, including on Radio New Zealand and in The London Reader. He has presented at several writers' festivals including the Auckland Writers Festival and the Samesame But Different Festival for LGBTQIA+ writers.

His short story collection, Home Theatre, was published by Te Herenga Waka University Press in 2022. It won the Hubert Church Prize for Fiction at the 2023 Ockham New Zealand Book Awards, awarded to the best first book, and was a finalist in the 2023 Sir Julius Vogel Awards. A review in Landfall called it a "beautifully crafted and empathetic debut collection". The judges' comments for the Hubert Church Prize described it as "unfailingly inventive", saying that Lapwood:

... writes skilfully in all genres, ranging smoothly from domestic stories to science fiction to love stories to historical fiction, and sometimes all four at once. He demonstrates a keen interest in technology, both contemporary and of the past. Lapwood’s writing is sophisticated and of great promise.

On 6 July 2023 Creative New Zealand announced that Lapwood is the 2023 recipient of the Louis Johnson New Writer's Bursary.
