= Nafanua Purcell Kersel =

New Zealand poet

- Born: Samoa
- Education: International Institute of Modern Letters (MA, 2022)
- Occupation: Poet
- Children: 3
- Awards: Mary and Peter Biggs Award for Poetry

Nafanua Purcell Kersel is a Samoan New Zealand poet. Her debut poetry collection, Black Sugarcane, received the Mary and Peter Biggs Award for Poetry at the 2026 Ockham New Zealand Book Awards.

== Life and career ==
Kersel was born in Samoa and moved to New Zealand as a four-year-old in the 1980s. She grew up in Wellington, New Zealand, where she began writing poetry as a teenager. She moved with her family to Hawke's Bay in the early 2000s, and as of 2026 she is based in Maraekakaho. She holds a Master of Arts degree from the International Institute of Modern Letters at Victoria University of Wellington, completed in 2022. She has three children.

Kersel's poetry has been published in journals and anthologies including Cordite Poetry Review, Landfall, the 2022 edition of Best New Zealand Poems, Turbine / Kapohau, and Vā: Stories by Women of the Moana (2022). She won the 2020 Hawke's Bay Poetry Slam, and was the 2025 Emerging Pasfika Writer in Residence at Victoria University.

In addition to her written poetry, Kersel is known for performance poetry, creative writing workshops and work with Pasifika communities.

== Black Sugarcane ==
Kersel's debut poetry collection, Black Sugarcane, was published in 2025, having received the Biggs Family Prize in Poetry as an unpublished manuscript in 2022. Kersel has described the book as a collection of stories that inadvertently became poems. Ruby Macomber, reviewing the collection for the Aotearoa New Zealand Review of Books, described Kersel as "capable of impressive worldbuilding and of careful, high-impact detail", and concluded that the collection contributes "to a growing, bold Pasifika poetry canon".

In 2026, Black Sugarcane won the Mary and Peter Biggs Award for Poetry at the Ockham New Zealand Book Awards, New Zealand's top award for poetry. Judge Daren Kamali said that each of Kersel's poems "pulses with clarity, restraint, and quiet power, revealing the extraordinary within the ordinary".

== Selected works ==
- Black Sugarcane (Te Herenga Waka University Press, 2025)
