= International Institute of Modern Letters =

Creative writing programme at Victoria University of Wellington

- Te Pūtahi Tuhi Auaha o te Ao
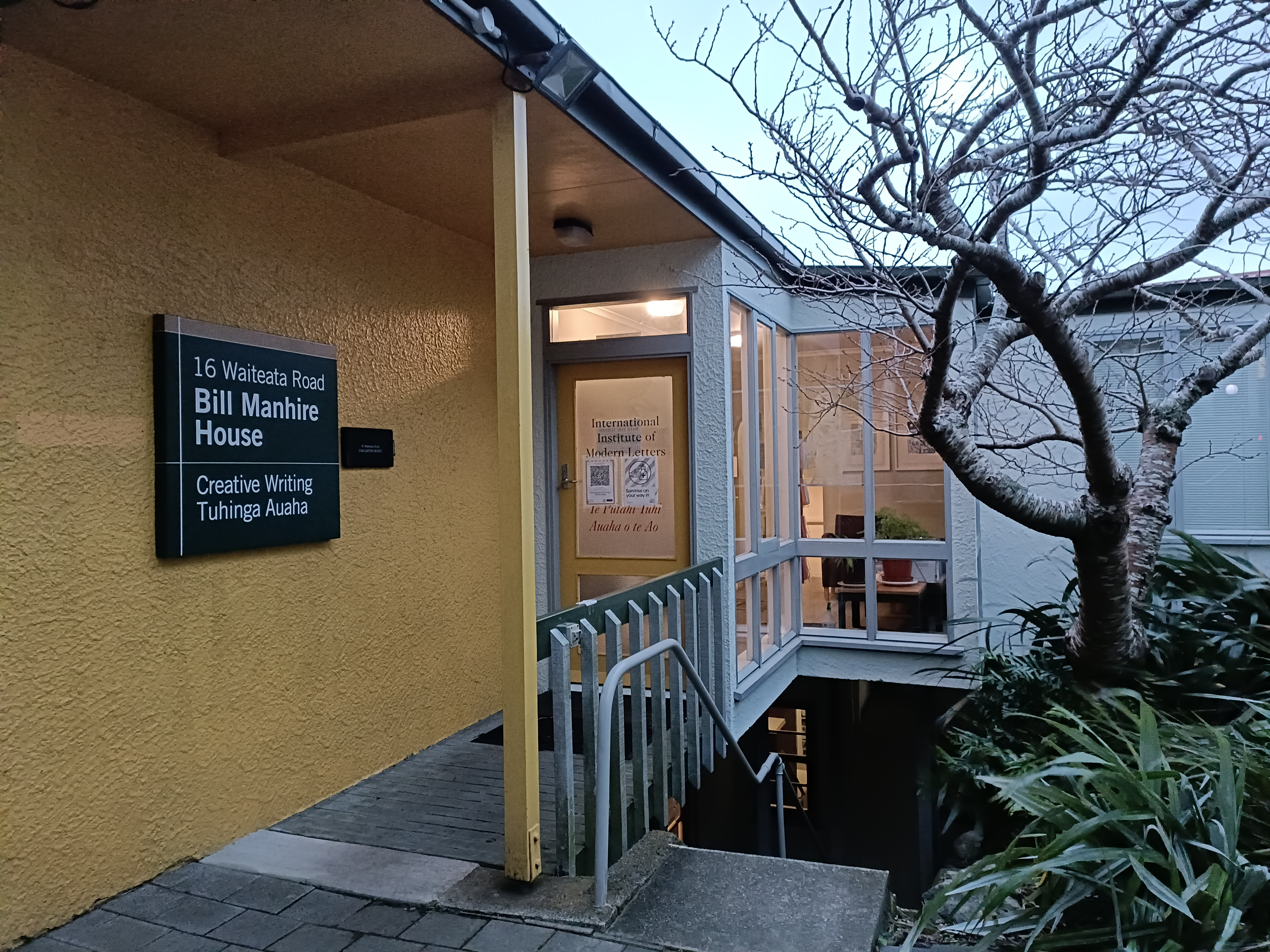
- Bill Manhire House
- Abbreviation: IIML
- Formation: 2001; 25 years ago
- Founder: Bill Manhire
- Location: Wellington, New Zealand
- Key people: Damien Wilkins (director)
- Parent organisation: Victoria University of Wellington
- Website: Official website

The International Institute of Modern Letters (IIML; Māori: Te Pūtahi Tuhi Auaha o te Ao) is a centre of creative writing based within Victoria University of Wellington. Founded in 2001, the IIML offers undergraduate and postgraduate courses (including a PhD in creative writing) and has taught many leading New Zealand writers. It publishes the annual Ōrongohau | Best New Zealand Poems anthology and an online journal, and offers several writing residencies. Until 2013 the IIML was led by the poet Bill Manhire, who had headed Victoria's creative writing programme since 1975; since his retirement, Damien Wilkins has taken over as the IIML's director.

== History ==
The IIML developed out of creative writing courses run by Bill Manhire at the university since 1975. Initially undergraduate courses were offered, and a master's degree programme (New Zealand's first master's degree in creative writing) was introduced in 1997. Manhire's courses involved setting writing exercises to allow students to get to know each other's work and become comfortable giving and receiving feedback, followed by the students developing more extensive formal portfolios. The courses were popular and over-subscribed; in 1996, 150 people applied for 12 places. In 1997, an anthology of writing from the course was published, titled Mutes and Earthquakes: Bill Manhire's creative writing course at Victoria, followed by Spectacular Babies in 2001. A review of the latter by David Hill commented: "If every other New Zealand writer stopped writing today, Bill Manhire's graduates could probably keep our publishers and readers ticking over". Fergus Barrowman, editor of literary magazine Sport, noted that Sport's first issues in the late 1980s "were full of unknown writers who had recently done Bill's undergraduate course ... and a few years later those were our leading writers".

In 2001 American casino businessman Glenn Schaeffer (himself a graduate of the Iowa Writer's Workshop) approached Manhire and offered to support the creation of an independent creative writing institute within the university. Schaeffer suggested naming it the Institute of Modern Letters initially and Wole Soyinka suggested adding International to the title. The university accepted Schaeffer's offer, and the IIML was established, offering master's degrees to 10 fulltime students. The following year, the programme was expanded to 20 students. Schaeffer continued to support the IIML for the next decade, including by establishing a $65,000 Prize in Modern Letters that was awarded every second year from 2002 to 2008, and in 2005 by offering to match the IIML's fundraising by one US dollar for every NZ dollar raised, up to US$1 million. The $1 million figure was met 24 hours before the deadline.

Manhire taught and ran the IIML for over a decade until his retirement. He has said he prefers to call it "Victoria's creative writing programme", noting that the full title "is such a mouthful" that is "almost at odds with the fine use of language". Others who have taught courses at the IIML include Damien Wilkins, Chris Price, Bernadette Hall, Dinah Hawken, Ken Duncum, Emily Perkins, and Fiona Samuel. The IIML introduced a three-year full-time PhD course in 2008, requiring students to undertake critical as well as creative work. Manhire explained at the time that this was in response to "many inquiries over the last few years, from outside New Zealand as well as from our own masters graduates".

After Manhire's retirement as the IIML's director in 2013, Wilkins succeeded him as director, and the IIML's building was renamed the Bill Manhire House. When asked about Manhire's close association with the programme, Wilkins noted: "I think Bill is now a brand. And actually the brand is free of the person. I think he's like Colonel Sanders. People now know there’s not actually a white Southern gentleman cooking the chicken but they still go there."

In 2022, the IIML celebrated 21 years since its foundation, concurrently with Victoria University celebrating 125 years.

== Activities ==
The IIML offers undergraduate writing courses, master's degrees in two different streams (writing for the page, covering poetry, fiction and creative non-fiction, and scriptwriting) and a PhD. It is affiliated with the Iowa Writer's Workshop in the United States. The IIML hosts a yearly writer's residency (continuing a programme begun by the university in 1979), and since 2019 has also offered an Emerging Pasifika Writer residency and an Emerging Māori Writer residency. Past residents have included Joseph Musaphia (1979), Jack Lasenby (1993), Charlotte Randall (2001), Paula Boock (2009) and Victor Rodger (2017). The IIML offers several other writing awards, including the Adam Foundation Prize in Creative Writing which is awarded each year to the best master's degree portfolio.

The IIML publishes the Ōrongohau | Best New Zealand Poems anthology annually, which each year includes 25 poems from New Zealand contemporary poets. The IIML also publishes an annual online journal Turbine | Kapohau featuring student contributions and editors. From 2005 to 2009 the IIML held a National Schools Writing Festival, and as of 2022 continues to hold a National Schools Poetry Award for high school students.

The IIML promotes the publication of its students, with many going on to become award-winning and successful writers. In 2000, Patrick Evans, professor of English at the University of Canterbury, observed that the connections formed between Victoria's creative writing classes, Sport and Te Herenga Waka University Press (then Victoria University Press) were helping "young writers to find publication more easily and quickly than before". Barrowman has said that Sport "grew closer to IIML" over the years, with Barrowman as editor reviewing students' folios each year. Evans has criticised, however, the IIML's predominance in New Zealand literature, describing it in 2003 as a "conveyor belt" producing what he considered homogenised writing. Poet David Howard has likewise criticised the IIML for its workshop model and emphasis on peer feedback. Howard regards "the emphasis on peer validation as more dangerous for the poet than the prose writer", and considers that the most successful IIML graduates are novelists as a result.

== Notable alumni ==
=== IIML alumni ===
- Pip Adam (MA, 2011)
- Michele Amas (MA in poetry, 2005)
- Michalia Arathimos (PhD, 2013)
- Tusiata Avia (MA in poetry, 2002)
- Hinemoana Baker (MA in poetry, 2002)
- Airini Beautrais (PhD in poetry, 2016)
- Hera Lindsay Bird (MA in poetry, 2011)
- Eleanor Catton (MA, 2008)
- Lynda Chanwai-Earle (MA in scriptwriting, 2005)
- David Coventry (MA, 2010)
- Jackie Davis (MA, 2001)
- Stephanie de Montalk (PhD, 2014)
- Pip Desmond (MA, 2006)
- Sam Duckor-Jones (MA in poetry, 2017)
- Kate Duignan (PhD, 2017)
- Laurence Fearnley (PhD, 2012)
- Gigi Fenster (PhD, 2016)
- Joan Fleming (MA in poetry, 2007)
- Mīria George (MA in scriptwriting, 2008)
- Helen Heath (PhD in poetry, 2017)
- Whiti Hereaka (MA in scriptwriting, 2002)
- Emma Hislop (MA, 2013)
- Lynn Jenner (PhD, 2013)
- Annaleese Jochems (MA, 2016)
- Simone Kaho (MA in poetry, 2011)
- Eli Kent (MA in scriptwriting, 2010)
- Rachael King (MA, 2001)
- Saradha Koirala (MA in poetry, 2007)
- Nafanua Purcell Kersel (MA in poetry, 2022)
- Anthony Lapwood (MA, 2018)
- Louise Wareham Leonard (MA, 2003)
- Christine Leunens (PhD, 2012)
- Rose Lu (MA, 2018)
- Tina Makereti (PhD, 2013)
- Tina Manker (MA, 2020)
- Kirsten McDougall (MA, 2004)
- Frankie McMillan (MA, 1999)
- Paula Morris (MA, 2001)
- Mikaela Nyman (PhD, 2020)
- Sue Orr (PhD, 2016)
- Sarah Jane Parton (MA, 2015)
- April Phillips (MA in scriptwriting, 2010)
- Vivienne Plumb (MA, 2001)
- Nina Mingya Powles (MA in poetry, 2015)
- Rebecca Priestley (MA in non-fiction, 2018)
- Maraea Rakuraku (MA in scriptwriting, 2016)
- Rebecca K Reilly (MA, 2019)
- Catherine Robertson (MA, 2015)
- Anna Smaill (MA, 2002)
- Tusi Tamasese (MA in scriptwriting, 2008)
- Anna Taylor (MA, 2006)
- Tayi Tibble (MA in poetry, 2017)
- Ariana Tikao (MA, 2022)
- Chris Tse (MA, 2005)
- Kathryn van Beek (MA in scriptwriting, 2002)
- Louise Wallace (MA, 2008)
- Ashleigh Young (MA, 2009)

=== Pre-IIML writing programme alumni ===
- Barbara Anderson
- Ann Beaglehole
- Helen Beaglehole
- Jenny Bornholdt
- Rachel Bush
- Kate Camp
- Catherine Chidgey
- Ken Duncum
- David Geary
- Kirsty Gunn
- Dinah Hawken
- Ingrid Horrocks
- Eirlys Hunter
- Kapka Kassabova
- Elizabeth Knox
- Anthony McCarten
- Emma Neale
- Jenny Pattrick
- Emily Perkins
- Chris Price
- Jo Randerson
- Alison Wong

== Publications ==
- Manhire, Bill, ed. (1997). Mutes & Earthquakes: Bill Manhire's creative writing course at Victoria. Wellington, New Zealand: Victoria University Press. ISBN 9780864733184.
- Anderson, Karen; Manhire, Bill, eds. (2001). Spectacular Babies: new writing. Auckland, New Zealand: Flamingo. ISBN 9781869503772.
- Manhire, Bill; Price, Chris; Wilkins, Damien; Duncum, Ken, eds. (2011). The Exercise Book: creative writing exercises from Victoria University's Institute of Modern Letters. Wellington: Victoria University Press. ISBN 9780864736857.
- Manhire, Bill; Wilkins, Damien, eds. (2011). The Best of Best New Zealand Poems. Wellington: Victoria University Press. ISBN 9780864737533.
- Price, Chris; Perkins, Emily, eds. (2017). The Fuse Box: essays on writing from Victoria University's International Institute of Modern Letters. Wellington: Victoria University Press. ISBN 9781776561650.
