= Geoff Cochrane =

New Zealand poet (1951–2022)

- Born: Geoffrey O'Neill Cochrane; 1951; Wellington, New Zealand
- Died: November 2022 (aged 71); Wellington, New Zealand
- Occupation: Poet; novelist; short story writer
- Notable awards: Arts Foundation Laureate (2014)

Geoffrey O'Neill Cochrane (1951 – November 2022) was a New Zealand poet, novelist and short story writer. He published 19 collections of poetry, a novel and a collection of short fiction. Many of his works were set in or around his hometown of Wellington, and his personal battles with alcoholism were a frequent source of inspiration.

== Life and career ==
Cochrane was born in Wellington in 1951 and attended St Patrick's College. His family were Catholic, and he has described his father as a "frustrated painter" who worked for New Zealand's betting organisation, the TAB.

His first five poetry collections were published by private presses, beginning with Images of Midnight City in 1976. Peter Simpson in The Press called this first collection a "strong beginning", describing Cochrane as a "very eloquent" poet with "a sure sense of rhythm and phrasing". He began to write full-time in 1990, after giving up alcohol. In 1992 a collection of poems from his earlier collections, plus 27 new poems, was published as Aztec Noon by Victoria University Press (VUP). His publicist at VUP, Kirsten McDougall, noted "his work was widely ignored by those who give out prizes and seats at festivals". The Oxford Companion to New Zealand Literature describes his poetry as "spare in form and precise in language", and of an "often melancholy mood". Alcoholism and Wellington often feature in his poetry.

Cochrane published two novels, Tin Nimbus (1995) and Blood (1997). Both are about an alcoholic's experiences with institutions in late 1970s Wellington, reflecting Cochrane's personal experiences. Tin Nimbus was a regional finalist in the 1996 Commonwealth Writers' Prize for best first book. A review of Blood for The Sunday Star-Times said Cochrane "has injected into this full-blooded novel the futility and bewilderment, the fear and loathing, of everyday life"; The Evening Post compared it to the later work of Jack Kerouac. Of his short fiction, collected in Astonished Dice (2014), reviewer Grant Smithies for The Sunday Star Times has said Cochrane "has a poet's economy with language, an alcoholic's understanding of pain, a lapsed Catholic's feel for mystery; a cinematographer's eye for a strong image".

In 2009 he was awarded the Janet Frame Prize for Poetry. In eight out of the twelve years from 2003 to 2014, and in 2019 and 2020, his poems were selected for the online anthology Best New Zealand Poems. His 2007 entry in the anthology, "Chemotherapy", was written about the death of New Zealand author Nigel Cox. In 2010 he received the first Nigel Cox Unity Books Award.

In 2014 Cochrane was made an Arts Foundation of New Zealand Laureate as one of New Zealand's "most outstanding practising artists". In 2019 his collection The Black and the White was selected by The Spinoff as one of the ten best poetry collections of 2019, with the reviewer noting "I like it because Geoff can still get grumpy".

== Death and Selected Poems ==
Cochrane died at his home in Wellington in November 2022, aged 71. New Zealand's poet laureate Chris Tse wrote a poem in tribute titled "Starship (version)".

In November 2023 the Selected Poems: Geoff Cochrane collection, edited by Fergus Barrowman, was published by Te Herenga Waka University Press. The Listener highlighted it as one of the best poetry collections of the year: "The best work of the late, prolific poet who saw things at ground level, gleaned from the 20 collections he wrote". Harry Ricketts, reviewing the collection for Radio New Zealand, said that Cochrane's poems are full of "brilliant splinters of language and perception", and that he is "definitely the Wellington poet".

== Selected works ==
=== Poetry collections ===
- Images of Midnight City (1976)
- Solstice (1979, with Victoria Broome and Lindsay Rabbitt)
- The Sea the Landsman Knows (1980) ISBN 9780908595044
- Taming the Smoke (1983)
- Kandinsky's Mirror (1989) ISBN 9780473008482
- Aztec Noon (1992) ISBN 9780864732316
- Into India (1999) ISBN 9780864733573
- Acetylene (2001) ISBN 9780864734198
- Vanilla Wine (2003) ISBN 9780864734716
- Hypnic Jerks (2005) ISBN 9780864735003
- 84-484 (2007) ISBN 9780864735584
- Pocket Edition (2009) ISBN 9780864736048
- The Worm in the Tequila (2010) ISBN 9780864736208
- The Bengal Engine's Mango Afterglow (2012) ISBN 9780864737618
- Wonky Optics (2015) ISBN 9780864739810
- RedEdits (2017) ISBN 9781776561117
- The Black and the White (2019) ISBN 9781776562152
- Chosen (2020) ISBN 9781776564088
- Selected Poems (2023, edited by Fergus Barrowman) ISBN 9781776921201

=== Other work ===
- Tin Nimbus (1995, novel) ISBN 9780864732798
- Blood (1997, novel) ISBN 9780864733269
- Brindle Embers (2002, short fiction) ISBN 9780959792119
- White Nights (2004, short fiction) ISBN 9780959792225
- Astonished Dice (2014, short fiction) ISBN 9781776560127
