= Michalia Arathimos =

Greek–New Zealand writer

- Born: Wellington, New Zealand
- Occupation: Novelist; short story writer
- Education: PhD, Victoria University of Wellington
- Notable works: Aukati (2017)

Michalia Arathimos is a Greek–New Zealand writer. She has held several writers' residencies in New Zealand, and received several awards for her short stories. Her debut novel, Aukati, was published in 2017.

== Life and career ==
Arathimos was born in Wellington. Her mother is Greek and her father is a New Zealander. She holds a PhD in creative writing from the International Institute of Modern Letters at Victoria University of Wellington, supervised by Damien Wilkins and Mark Williams. After finishing her PhD, she and her partner moved to Western Australia for a year and subsequently to Melbourne, where she worked as a book reviewer for Overland. In 2016 she came second in the Landfall Essay Competition.

In 2016 she won the Sunday Star-Times short story competition (open category) with her short story "The Beauty of Mrs Lim". The main character in her story was inspired by her grandmother, who immigrated to New Zealand in the 1950s. She has twice been shortlisted for the Overland Victoria University Short Story Prize in Australia. In 2017 her first novel Aukati was published by Mākaro Press. It was launched at the Melbourne Writers Festival, and features the relationship of a Greek woman and a Māori man and their cultural differences. Sue Orr, reviewing the book for Landfall, said Aukati "is a book of and for our time and deserves to be widely read, studied and debated". In the same year Arathimos was awarded a Copyright Licensing of New Zealand / New Zealand Society of Authors research grant towards a writing project about the status of Māori and other minority authors in New Zealand culture.

In 2020 she received the Carmel Bird Digital Literary Award for her short story collection Apologia. The award is made to new works of short fiction by Australian writers. Having lived in Melbourne for a decade, in 2020 she returned to New Zealand, where she spent six months in Wellington as the recipient of the Randell Cottage Writers' Residency. She subsequently spent four months in Auckland as the recipient of the Grimshaw Sargeson Fellowship. She was the 2021 Waikato University writer-in-residence.
