= Jane Stafford (New Zealand professor) =

New Zealand literature academic

- Born: New Zealand
- Other name: Jane Elizabeth Horgan
- Education: Victoria University of Wellington
- Scientific career
- Fields: Literature of New Zealand
- Workplaces: Victoria University of Wellington
- Thesis: An examination of the "De Passione" Section of John of Grimestone's Preaching Book (1986)

Jane Stafford is a New Zealand literature academic, and as of 2019 is a full professor at the Victoria University of Wellington.

== Academic career ==
After a 1986 PhD titled 'An examination of the "De Passione" Section of John of Grimestone's Preaching Book' at the Victoria University of Wellington, Stafford moved to staff, rising to full professor.

Stafford has published widely on the early literature of New Zealand and contemporary poetry.

== Selected works ==
- Stafford, Jane, and Mark Williams. Maoriland: New Zealand Literature, 1872-1914. Victoria University Press, 2006.
- Stafford, Jane. Colonial Literature and the Native Author: indigeneity and empire. Springer, 2016.
- Jackson, Anna, and Jane Stafford, eds. Floating Worlds: Essays on Contemporary New Zealand Fiction. Victoria University Press, 2009.
