= Emma Hislop =

New Zealand writer

- Education: International Institute of Modern Letters (MCW)
- Occupation: Short story writer
- Notable work: Ruin (2023)
- Children: 1
- Awards: Hubert Church Best First Book Award for Fiction (2024)

Emma Hislop is a New Zealand short story writer. Her 2023 collection of short stories, Ruin, won the Hubert Church Best First Book Award for fiction at the 2024 Ockham New Zealand Book Awards.

== Life and career ==
Hislop is of Kāi Tahu descent and grew up in the Far North District. When she was 13 her family moved to Taranaki; she moved to London in her twenties and returned to New Zealand in 2006. As of 2024 she lives in Taranaki.

She completed her master's degree in creative writing at the International Institute of Modern Letters at Victoria University of Wellington in 2013. Her supervisor for her master's was Emily Perkins. During her course she began working on the manuscript for Ruin.

Hislop's collection of short stories, Ruin, was published by Te Herenga Waka University Press in 2023. Hislop has said that the stories "changed significantly" over the ten years between her master's course and publication, but that "the glimmer of truth always stayed the same". The cover artist for the book was Maiangi Waitai. Airini Beautrais, reviewing the work for Landfall, said the book "is not a feel-good book, but a good book for exploring uncomfortable things".

In 2023 Hislop successfully sought crowd-funding to support her work on her planned first novel, and spoke to the Taranaki Daily News to advocate for a universal basic income for artists.

== Honours and awards ==
In 2023 Hislop held writer's residencies at Robert Lord Writers’ Cottage in Dunedin and at Varuna, The Writers' House in Sydney.

In May 2024 she was announced as one of six recipients of the Arts Foundation of New Zealand Springboard awards. The prize for the award was $15,000 and a mentorship from Patricia Grace.

In 2024 Ruin won the Hubert Church Best First Book Award for Fiction at the Ockham New Zealand Book Awards. The category convenor said that Hislop's stories demonstrated an "artful control of situation, character, and language to examine the fallout of painful events which largely occur off stage" and that Hislop is a "striking new voice" in New Zealand literature.

== Selected works ==
- Ruin (short story collection, Te Herenga Waka University Press, 2023)
