= Helen Heath =

New Zealand poet

Dr Helen Heath
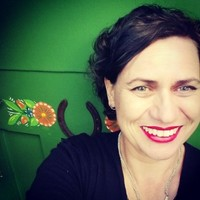
- Born: 1970 (age 55–56)
- Education: Victoria University of Wellington
- Writing career
- Language: English
- Genre: Poetry
- Notable work: Graft
- Notable awards: NZSA Jessie McKay Best First Book Award for Poetry
- Website: Official website

Helen Heath (born 1970) is a poet from New Zealand.

== Background ==
Heath is based in Wellington, New Zealand. She received her MA and PhD in Creative Writing from the International Institute of Modern Letters, at the Victoria University of Wellington. In 2017 she was publishing programme leader at Whitireia Publishing (part of Whitireia Community Polytechnic).

== Works ==
Heath's poetry explores ideas of science, motherhood and grief, and she draws inspiration from scientists such as Isaac Newton.

Heath's first published work was the chapbook, Watching the Smoke. In 2012 she published her first poetry collection, Graft. Her collection Are Friends Electric? was published in 2018 by Victoria University Press.

Heath has also been published in the Best New Zealand Poems series (2012) and literary journals, including Turbine, Swamp, 4th Floor, and Snorkel.

== Awards ==
Graft won the 2013 NZSA Jessie McKay Best First Book Award for Poetry at the New Zealand Post Book Awards.

The scientific perspective of the poetry in Graft led her poem ‘Making Tea in the Universe’ to win the 2011 inaugural Science Teller Poetry Award. In 2013, the collection became the first book of poetry or fiction work to be shortlisted for the Royal Society Science Book Prize. The book was also listed in the New Zealand Listener's Top 100 Books of 2012.

In 2019 Are Friends Electric? won the Mary and Peter Biggs Award for Poetry at the Ockham New Zealand Book Awards.

== Bibliography ==
- —— (2012). Graft (paperback 1st ed.). Victoria University Press. ISBN 9780864737762.
- —— (2018). Are Friends Electric? (paperback 1st ed.). Victoria University Press. ISBN 9781776561902.
