= Ann Shelton (photographer) =

New Zealand photographer and academic

- Born: 1 August 1967
- Occupation: Photographer
- Website: www.annshelton.com

Ann Shelton (born 1967) is a New Zealand photographer and academic.

== Early life and education ==
Shelton was born in Timaru. She completed a Bachelor of Fine Arts at Elam School of Fine Arts, University of Auckland in 1995 and a Master of Fine Arts at the University of British Columbia in 2002.

== Career ==
Shelton began her career as a photojournalist working for daily newspapers, before deciding she wanted more control over her images and deciding to go to art school. As an artist, her work mixes conceptual and narrative traditions of photography. In large-scale, hyper-real photographs she explores histories of people and of places, often bringing forgotten or controversial histories to light. Shelton has also shown a steady interest in the nature of the archive, exploring the collections of others in her work.

Shelton first came to attention with the series Redeye. Selected from thousands of photographs taken over a period of two years, the work documents Auckland's art scene and its gallery openings, performances and underground events, especially those taking place around the artist-run space Teststrip. Shelton has acknowledged Abigail Soloman-Godeau's essay 'Inside/Out' as an influence on the Redeye works. Described by the artist as a 'social diary', the series was described by Auckland Art Gallery photography curator Ron Brownson as 'some of the most inventive and risk taking in recent art in New Zealand,'.

Her 2000 series Abigail's Party consists of seven photographs which initially look like documentary shots of modernist homes' living rooms. However each image was staged in Shelton's own home. Discussing the works, Ingrid Neilson wrote:

Shelton hints at the difference between her images and the ‘real thing’, through her use of colour. While documentary photographs of modernist design are usually black and white, Shelton’s works are full, vibrant colour. Through reconstructing modernism, Shelton also has the opportunity to rewrite its history, and she does so with a feminist twist. Her use of luscious, juicy colours, tactile fabric, domestic settings, and titles such as Calendar Girl, Golden Girl or Show Girl, feminise and sexualise these modernist spaces.

One of Shelton's best-known works is the multi-part A library to scale. The artist took as her subject over 3,500 volumes of media clippings and handwritten transcriptions pasted into notebooks and hardback books by amateur historian Frederick B. Butler over a period of 60 years. She discovered the volumes at Puke Ariki museum while undertaking a residency at the nearby Govett-Brewster Art Gallery. Fascinated by Butler's enormous project and the richly visual sight of the shelves and shelves of collaged notebooks stored at the museum, Shelton went on to make several works relating to the archive: large-format photographs that reproduce the shelves; videos which show the pages of individual books being turned; and photographs of individual pages from Butler's own diaries. The works have been shown in solo presentations and also as part of group exhibitions examining the nature of the archives, such as Collect/Project at the Adam Art Gallery and Unpacking my library at Te Tuhi.

Shelton has frequently employed techniques of doubling, reversing and inverting photographs. She refers to this approach as 'visual stammering', and uses it to draw attention to the subjectivity of photography. Doublet (after Heavenly Creatures), Parker/Hulme crime scene, Port Hills, Christchurch, New Zealand (from 2001) from her Public Spaces series (2001–2003) for example is a diptych made up of a single image of a curve of a forest path, one moving to the left and one to the right. The seemingly banal image draws its power from the site it documents, the location of the murder of Honorah Parker, later dramatised in Peter Jackson's film Heavenly Creatures. In another work, Wintering, after a Van der Velden study, Otira Gorge from 2008, Shelton works from a preparatory sketch by Dutch-born artist Petrus van der Velden held in the collection of the Hocken Library at the University of Otago, choosing the rough drawing over the artist's dramatic oil paintings of the same topic.

A recent series, jane says, created for her 2016 exhibition at Auckland Art Gallery Dark Matter, features plants traditionally associated with treatments for women's fertility placed in ikebana-like arrangements against vibrant coloured backgrounds. The artist spent a year researching, collecting, arranging and photographing the plants, which include thistle, fennel, rhododendron and yarrow. She says:

Ikebana, as I understand it, is the concept that nature is perfect, but there is just a little bit too much of it. It needs distilling and minimising and controlling. I was thinking about what would be an appropriate way to photograph these plants, something that would convey the control they are capable of asserting.

Between 2008 and 2018, Shelton served as a trustee of Enjoy Public Art Gallery, Wellington's longest running artist-run space. She co-chaired Enjoy's board from 2010 to 2012 and was its Chair from 2012 to 2018.

== Exhibitions ==
- 1997 Redeye, Manawatu Art Gallery, Artspace, Auckland, Robert McDougall Art Annex, Dunedin Public Art Gallery
- 2000 Abigail's Party, Adam Art Gallery; The Strip, Experimental Art Foundation, Adelaide.
- 2003 K Hole, Lopdell House Gallery, Auckland
- 2004 A kind of sleep, Govett-Brewster Art Gallery
- 2005 Ann Shelton: Bifocal, Forrester Gallery, Oamaru
- 2006–2007 A library to scale, Enjoy Public Art Gallery, Govett-Brewster Art Gallery, Starkwhite Gallery, Auckland, Centre for Contemporary Photography, Melbourne (in various configurations at each gallery)
- 2007 26 photos of a house, Ramp Gallery, Hamilton
- 2008 Room Room, City Gallery Wellington and Gus Fisher Gallery, Auckland; Once more with feeling, Hocken Library, Dunedin
- 2012 In a forest, (excerpts) The Dowse Art Museum; a library to scale, New Zealand Pavilion, Frankfurt Book Fair, Frankfurt; In a forest (excerpts), The Australian Center for Photography, Sydney,
- 2013 The city of gold and lead, Sarjeant Art Gallery; doublethink (off-site project) Govett-Brewster Art Gallery
- 2015 House Work: A project about a house, Enjoy Public Art Gallery, with words by Pip Adam
- 2016 Ann Shelton: Dark Matter, Auckland Art Gallery
- 2019 Close to the wind, Two Rooms, Auckland, curated by Heather Galbraith

== Collections ==
- Auckland Art Gallery Toi o Tamaki
- Christchurch Art Gallery Te Puna o Waiwhetu
- Museum of New Zealand Te Papa Tongarewa
- University of Auckland Art Collection

== Publications ==
- Ron Brownson (ed), Ann Shelton: Redye, Auckland: Rim Books, 1997. ISBN 0473044129
- Greg Burke (ed), A kind of sleep, New Plymouth: Govett-Brewster Art Gallery, 2005
- Francis Pound, A library to scale, Auckland: Rim Books, 2006. ISBN 047311254X
- Jeremy Cooper, Passion and Compassion, Wellington: Enjoy Public Art Gallery 2007
- Martin Patrick, Room Room, Wellington and Whanganui: City Gallery Wellington and McNamara Gallery, 2008
- Natalie Poland, Once more with feeling, Dunedin: Hocken Library, 2008
- Hanna Scott, Sightseeing, Auckland: Rim Books, 2010. ISBN 9780473165604
- Ann Shelton and Stephen Turner, Wastelands, Auckland: Rim Books, 2010.
- Emma Bugden, A tree obverse, Lower Hutt: The Dowse Art Museum, 2012. ISBN 9780987668509
- Sarah McClintock (ed), The city of gold and lead, Whanganui: Sarjeant Art Gallery, 2013. ISBN 9780986456985
- Ann Shelton and Sarah Caylor, Holland Street, Wellington: Rim Books, 2013. ISBN 9780473257255
- Meredith Robertshawe, Ann Shelton: doublethink, New Plymouth: Govett-Brewster Art Gallery, 2013. ISBN 9780908848737
- Alice Tappenden (ed), A Spoonful of Sugar, Auckland: Rim Books, 2015. ISBN 9780994130600
- Dark Matter, Auckland: Auckland Art Gallery Toi o Tamaki, 2016. ISBN 9780864633095

=== Artist books ===
- Ann Shelton, Metadata, Auckland: Starkwhite, 2011
