= Rangi Kipa =

New Zealand sculptor, carver, illustrator and tā moko artist

Kipa in 1999

Rangi Kipa (born 1966) is a New Zealand sculptor, carver, illustrator and tā moko (traditional Māori tattoo) artist.

== Education ==
Kipa is a graduate of the Maraeroa Carving School in Porirua (1986), and completed a Bachelor of Social Sciences degree at the University of Waikato in 1994 and a Master of Māori Visual Arts degree at Massey University in 2006.

== Work ==
Kipa is probably best known for mixing customary Māori motifs and techniques with non-traditional materials. He is also interested in (in his own words) "participating in the revival of a number of Māori art forms that were affected by the colonial process in New Zealand".

Kipa was originally trained in customary carving traditions. He credits his transition towards contemporary art practice to his Master's study at the School of Māori Visual Arts, where he began carving Corian. He says "When I went to Massey I wanted to find a material I was totally unfamiliar with and in the second year I came across the manmade material Corian. It lit me up; before that I was using materials I had pretty much mastered and I was bored with them'’. Early examples of Kipa's Corian tiki were shown at Auckland Art Gallery in the exhibition Hei Tiki, which explored contemporary interpretations of the customary form. His contemporary hei tiki carving was featured on the New Zealand Post $1.50 stamp in the Matariki series in 2009.

He also makes and plays taonga pūoro. while at the University of Waikato he alongside his close friends and contemporaries Rangiiria Hedley and Pena Makoare enjoyed the tutelage and encouragement of Hiirini Melbourne to continue to develop Puoro as a living cultural practise.

Art historian Ngarino Ellis writes that patterns used in Kipa's tā moko "will be based on Kipa's whakairo (carving) practice, with a modern slant, both in the imagery and the ideas articulated within it". She continues

Kipa is keen to break boundaries and challenge the notion of tradition within Māori culture. Through his moko work, he is able to articulate contemporary Māori concerns about cultural and tribal identity and membership. His work demonstrates the potency of Māori art and its continual adaptation and response to new ideas from within and outside the culture. Kipa's moko work is just one aspect of his art practice that reflects an artist drawing on his cultural heritage in new and exciting ways, demonstrating how tradition and innovation are, in fact, one and the same.

In 2004 Kipa was a Te Waka Toi Inaugural Artist in Residence in the Jean-Marie Tjibaou Cultural Centre, Nouméa.

In 2006 he received the Creative New Zealand Craft/Object Art Fellowship. He used the award to generate his twist of an autobiographical expression of himself as a modern whare whakairo (carved meeting house) for inclusion in Star Power: Museum as Body Electric at the Museum of Contemporary Art Denver in 2007. Kipa was one of seven artists representing seven countries chosen for the museum's opening exhibition.

In 2014 Kipa was featured on Māori Television's series about tā moko in Aotearoa New Zealand, Moko Aotearoa.

In 2021 Kipa was Inducted as a NZ Arts Foundation Arts Laureate.

== Collections ==
Kipa's work is held in major collections in New Zealand including the Museum of New Zealand Te Papa Tongarewa, Puke Ariki and The Dowse Art Museum.

== Personal life ==
Kipa is of Māori (Taranak Iwi, Te Atiawa Nui Tonu, Ngati Mutunga and Ngati Tama ) descent.
