= Pip Adam =

New Zealand author (born 1970)

- Born: 1970 (age 55–56); Christchurch, New Zealand
- Occupations: Author and tutor
- Writing career
- Genre: Fiction
- Notable works: The New Animals (2017); Audition (2023)
- Notable awards: Acorn Foundation Fiction Prize (2018); Ursula K. Le Guin Prize (2026)

Academic background
- Education: Victoria University of Wellington (Phd)
- Thesis: At the Service of the Unusual: Ways to Write the Built Environment (2012)
- Doctoral advisor: Damien Wilkins; Andrew Charleson
- Website: pipadam.com

Pip Adam (born 1970) is a novelist, short story writer, and reviewer from New Zealand. She has published one collection of short stories and five novels. Her second novel, The New Animals, won New Zealand's top fiction prize at the 2018 New Zealand Book Awards, and in 2026, her fourth novel, Audition, won the international Ursula K. Le Guin Prize.

== Early life and education ==
Adam was born in Christchurch, New Zealand, in 1970, and grew up in Auckland. After leaving school at age 17, she worked as a hairdresser for 15 years off-and-on. She attended the New Zealand Film and Television School in Christchurch during this time, before spending time in a rehabilitation centre to address drug and alcohol addiction issues. Adam has said she had not read any novels until she read Emma by Jane Austen at age 27.

After being inspired by poet Bill Manhire on the radio, Adam moved to Dunedin where she completed a bachelor of arts degree in English literature at Otago University in 2000. In 2001, Adam moved to Wellington where she completed her master's degree in library and information studies at Victoria University of Wellington. She applied three times to the International Institute of Modern Letters at Victoria University for the master's degree programme in creative writing; she completed her master's in 2007. Her first book, Everything We Hoped For, was completed as part of her master's degree.

In 2012, Adam completed her PhD, supervised by Damien Wilkins. Her doctoral thesis considered how the language of structural engineering can influence fiction writing, and influenced her first novel I'm Working on a Building (published in 2013).

== Career ==
=== Early books ===
In 2010, Adam's first book, Everything We Hoped For, was published by Victoria University Press (VUP). Paula Green, in a review for The New Zealand Herald, described it as "a collection of 23 stories that reflect her devotion to the craft of writing". It received the NZSA Hubert Church Best First Book Award for Fiction at the 2011 New Zealand Post Book Awards. In 2012, Adam received the New Generation Award in the 2012 Macquarie Private Wealth New Zealand Arts Awards presented by the Arts Foundation of New Zealand.

In 2013, Adam's first novel, I'm Working on a Building, was published by VUP. The narrative, about the life of an engineer working on a replica of the Burj Khalifa, is told in reverse chronological order. In a review for Landfall, Tasha Haines noted the novel's connections to Adam's PhD thesis, which asked how the language of structural engineering can "inform, alter and enlarge fiction"; Adam "articulates a broad idea about humanity, time and place via a symbolic use of the built environment in its capacity as a container and scaffold for humanity". Chris Reed, in a review for Read NZ Te Pou Muramura, called it a "bold and unorthodox novel" and praised its non-conventional narrative form. Carl Shuker, writing in The Spinoff, lauded the book for containing "the finest piece of writing in New Zealand fiction this century".

=== The New Animals (2017) ===
Adam's second novel, The New Animals, was published by VUP in 2017. Initial critical reviews were mixed; The New Zealand Herald notes that reviewers "found it original and challenging but had difficulties with its structure, form and characters". Anna Rogers, in a review for The Listener described by Carl Shuker as "salted with bemusement and condescension", suggested that it would have been "helped by more attentive and thoughtful editing at all levels". Shuker himself called Adam a genius, and asked, "What the fuck are we doing in this country when we are not reviewing and talking about this book?"

The novel won the Acorn Foundation Fiction Prize, New Zealand's top award for fiction, at the 2018 New Zealand Book Awards. Adam received $50,000 prize money. The judges commented:

It's stylistically raw and reveals a good deal in a modest way. The New Animals is so vivid in imagery and imagination that the judges haven't stopped thinking about it since. In this category in 2018 it's the book with the most blood on the page. It will give you an electric shock.

The New Animals was published by Dorothy in the United States in 2023. James Pasley in the Los Angeles Review of Books noted that the novel is not always enjoyable to read, "because Adam refuses to look away, because she forces the reader to face up to the state of things." He concludes that the novel "might not be an easy read, but it is an important one", and describes Adam as "undoubtedly one of [New Zealand's] best writers". Publishers Weekly and Kirkus Reviews were both more lukewarm about the book, calling it "a bit of a slog [but] worth seeing through to the end" and "prosaic" respectively.

=== Later novels ===
In 2020, Adam's third novel Nothing to See was published by VUP. It is a novel about young women who have split into divided selves through traumatic experiences. It was shortlisted for the top prize for fiction at the Ockham New Zealand Book Awards in 2021. Charlotte Grimshaw said the novel "gives us a story of fractured lives, and at the same time delves into deeper mysteries". Philip Matthews, reviewing the novel for the Aotearoa New Zealand Review of Books, described it as being about "shame, loneliness, about wanting to do good and hoping for second chances — or third or fourth chances", and "finding new ways of being". He concluded that it was a "real achievement" for the book to cover all these themes as well as being "deeply affecting". Briar Lawry in The Spinoff said that like Adam's other works it is "compelling" but not an easy read: "Adam is an author who manages to lull you into thinking she’s playing by the literary rules while making her own playbook".

Adam's fourth novel, Audition, was published in 2023 by Te Herenga Waka University Press (formerly VUP) in New Zealand, by Giramondo in Australia and by Peninsula Press in the UK. It is an experimental and non-linear novel involving three giants conversing on a spaceship; Angelique Kasmara described it as a "blend of space opera and social realism [and] a fine example of Pip Adam’s ingenuity and imagination". Sarah Laing for Newsroom said it was "quite possibly" Adam's "most bonkers book yet": "It’s also audacious, inventive and radical, and this time round, a little hallucinatory". Lisa Tuttle in The Guardian called it "an unusual, thought-provoking blend of SF, surrealism and gritty social realism".

In 2026, Audition won the Ursula K. Le Guin Prize for Fiction, having been published in the USA by Coffee House Press in 2025. The judges said it is "an ambitious and original book about many things: the carceral state, dehumanisation, memory and, perhaps above all, forgiveness as a way forward". Adam was the first New Zealand writer to win the award. It was also shortlisted for the Jann Medlicott Acorn Prize for Fiction at the 2024 Ockham New Zealand Book Awards. and longlisted for the 2025 International Dublin Literary Award. It received a starred review from Kirkus Reviews.

Adam's fifth novel, Kluge (styled lowercase as kluge), was published in 2026, and explores the role of AI in modern life. Adam has described the work as a "scream into a dark room" in response to the state of the world in 2025. While much of the book is written in the voice of an LLM, Adam has said she did not use LLMs to write the book. Philip Matthews in Newsroom observed that no other New Zealand writer "is writing books like this": "As a reading experience, kluge is challenging and even frustrating. But in other ways it is fascinating and singular."

=== Other work and publications ===
Adam has been published in a number of literary journals including Overland (2015), takahē (2014), Fire Dials (2014), Sport (2008–2014), Landfall (2009, 2010), and Hue & Cry (2007–2013). She was a runner up in the 2007 Sunday Star Times Short Story Competition. She is a book reviewer on Jesse Mulligan's show broadcast on Radio New Zealand. She also hosts the Better off Read podcast. The photographer Ann Shelton used writing by Adam in her 2015 installation House Work: a project about a house.

Adam has taught creative writing at Victoria University of Wellington, Massey University and at Whitirea New Zealand. With the Write Where You Are collective, she taught writing at the Arohata Women's Prison; she left this programme, however, due to feeling conflicted about the prison system. She was appointed Creative New Zealand Writer in Residence for 2021 at the International Institute of Modern Letters at Victoria University.

== Personal life ==
Adam lives with her partner, Brent McIntyre, and their son in Wellington. She identifies as queer and pansexual.

== Bibliography ==
=== Novels ===
- I'm Working on a Building (Victoria University Press, 2013)
- The New Animals (Victoria University Press, 2017; Dorothy in 2023)
- Nothing to See (Victoria University Press, 2020)
- Audition (Te Herenga Waka University Press, 2023)
- Kluge, styled as kluge (Te Herenga Waka University Press, 2026)

=== Short story collection ===
- Everything We Hoped For (Victoria University Press, 2010)
