= Hera Lindsay Bird =

New Zealand poet

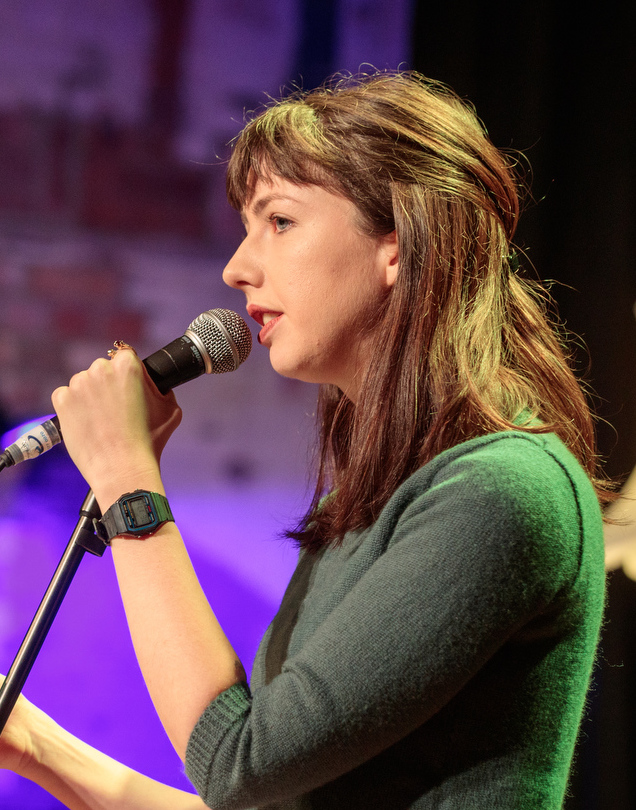
- Hera Lindsay Bird at WORD Christchurch 2018
- Born: 31 December 1987 (age 38); Thames, New Zealand
- Occupation: Poet
- Writing career
- Period: 2010s-present

Hera Lindsay Bird (born 31 December 1987) is a New Zealand poet.

== Life and career ==
Hera Lindsay Bird was born and raised in Thames in the North Island of New Zealand. She attended Victoria University of Wellington and then received her master's degree in poetry from its International Institute of Modern Letters. Her first collection of poetry, the self-titled Hera Lindsay Bird, was published by Victoria University Press in 2016 and Penguin UK in 2017 and won the Jessie Mackay Best First Book Award at the Ockham New Zealand Book Awards.

Bird first gained popularity when her poem "Keats Is Dead So Fuck Me From Behind" went viral in the summer of 2016. She and her work have since been profiled in VICE, I-D, and The Guardian.

In 2018 Bird's work was selected by British Poet Laureate Carol Ann Duffy to be published by Smith/Doorstop Books as part of their Laureate's Choice series. The published collection was called Pamper Me to Hell & Back.

In 2022 a Tweet posted by Bird in 2017 was ranked first on a list of the top New Zealand tweets of all time by The Spinoff. In 2023 Bird started writing a well received agony aunt column for The Spinoff, called 'Help Me Hera'.

In June 2025, Bird’s North American debut, Juvenilia, was published by Deep Vellum.

== Works ==
=== Poetry ===
- Hera Lindsay Bird (Victoria University Press, 2016) ISBN 9781776560714
- Pamper Me to Hell & Back: Laureate's Choice 2018 (Smith/Doorstop Books, 2018) ISBN 9781910367841
- Juvenilia (Deep Vellum, 2025) ISBN 9781646053773
