= Te Herenga Waka University Press =

University press in New Zealand

- Parent company: Victoria University of Wellington
- Country of origin: New Zealand
- Headquarters location: Wellington
- Distribution: Upstart Distribution
- Key people: Fergus Barrowman (Publisher), Ashleigh Young (Managing Editor), Jasmine Sargent (Editor - Māori), Kyleigh Hodgson (Editing and Production), Caoimhe McKeogh (Publicist), Melissa Oliver (Administrator).
- Publication types: Books
- No. of employees: 7
- Official website: teherengawakapress.co.nz

Te Herenga Waka University Press or THWUP (formerly Victoria University Press) is the book publishing arm of Victoria University of Wellington, located in Wellington, New Zealand. It publishes scholarly works, fiction and poetry. As of 2025, the press has published almost 1,000 books and has a core staff of five, plus editorial interns.

== History ==
Victoria University Press was founded in the early 1970s, with a single staff member. Fergus Barrowman became publisher in 1985 and remains in charge of the press. The press has grown significantly under Barrowman's leadership, expanding from publishing 15 titles annually in 2005 to an average of 32 books per year as of 2025. The press has developed a particular reputation for discovering new writers and publishing experimental and genre-bending work.

In 2019, Victoria University adopted the Māori name Te Herenga Waka ("the mooring place of canoes"), which previously just referred to the university marae. The press changed its name as of 1 January 2022 to Te Herenga Waka University Press. It adopted a new logo, designed by Philip Kelly and Rangi Kipa, which uses the initials THW to evoke a whare whakairo (carved meeting house).

=== Publications ===
THWUP is a scholarly publisher specialising in New Zealand history and public affairs. It is also a significant publisher of New Zealand literary fiction and poetry. Works include the novel The Luminaries by Eleanor Catton (2013 Man Booker Prize winner), Elizabeth Knox's The Absolute Book, poet Hera Lindsay Bird's debut Hera Lindsay Bird, and the works of poet Tayi Tibble. It has a backlist of over 400 books in print, and issues 32 new titles a year on average.

Books on Māori topics include collections of writings in Māori by Hirini Moko Mead and Āpirana Ngata, as well as Joan Metge's books on contemporary Māori society and cross-cultural communication.

=== Relationship with the university ===
The press receives funding from Victoria University. Barrowman has noted that this is crucial for the press and enables it to "take commercial risks, like first books and short stories".

=== Notable authors ===
Poets published by THWUP include:

- Fleur Adcock
- Tusiata Avia
- Hinemoana Baker
- Hera Lindsay Bird
- Jenny Bornholdt
- Kate Camp
- Geoff Cochrane
- Dinah Hawken
- Nafanua Purcell Kersel
- Bill Manhire (inaugural NZ Poet Laureate)
- Vincent O'Sullivan
- Tayi Tibble
- Brian Turner
- Ashleigh Young
- essa may ranapiri

Fiction writers published by THWUP include:

- Pip Adam
- Barbara Anderson
- Eleanor Catton (2013 Man Booker prize winner)
- Catherine Chidgey
- Bernadette Hall
- Elizabeth Knox
- Bruce Mason
- Tracey Slaughter
- Damien Wilkins
- Rebecca K Reilly

Non-fiction writers published by THWUP include:

- Rose Lu
- Shayne Carter
- Tina Makereti
- Ashleigh Young

=== Book series ===
Book series published by the press have included:

- New Zealand Playscripts
- THW Classics
- Victoria University of Wellington Inaugural Addresses
- VUP Classics

== Awards ==
Books published by THWUP have won Ockham New Zealand Book Awards including:

- Nafanua Purcell Kersel, Black Sugarcane (2026 Mary and Peter Biggs Award for Poetry)
- Damien Wilkins, Delirious (2025 Jann Medlicott Acorn Prize for Fiction)
- Michelle Rahurahu, Poorhara (2025 Hubert Church Prize for Best First Book of Fiction)
- Una Cruickshank, The Chthonic Cycle (2025 E.H. McCormick Prize for Best First Book of General Non-fiction)
- Emma Hislop, Ruin and Other Stories(2024 Hubert Church Prize for Best First Book of Fiction)
- Catherine Chidgey, The Axeman's Carnival (2023 Jann Medlicott Acorn Prize for Fiction)
- Anthony Lapwood, Home Theatre (2023 Hubert Church Prize for Best First Book of Fiction)
- Rebecca K Reilly, Greta & Valdin (2022 Hubert Church Prize for Best First Book of Fiction)
- Dave Lowe, The Alarmist: Fifty Years Measuring Climate Change (2022 E H McCormick Best First Book Award for General Non-Fiction)
- Airini Beautrais, Bug Week (2021 Jann Medlicott Acorn Foundation Prize for Fiction)
- Tusiata Avia, The Savage Coloniser Book (2021 Mary and Peter Biggs Prize for Poetry)
- Madison Hamill, Specimen (2021 EH McCormick Prize for General Non-fiction)
- Shayne Carter, Dead People I Have Known (2020 General Non-fiction Award winner and Best First Book of Non-fiction Award winner)
- Helen Heath, Are Friends Electric? (2019 Mary and Peter Biggs Prize for Poetry)
- Pip Adam, The New Animals (2018 Acorn Foundation Prize for Fiction)
- Catherine Chidgey, The Wish Child (2017 Acorn Foundation Prize for Fiction)
- Ashleigh Young, Can You Tolerate This? (2017 General Non-fiction Award winner)
- Andrew Johnston, Fits and Starts (2017 Poetry Award winner)
- Annaleese Jochems, Baby (2017 Hubert Church Prize for Fiction)
- David Coventry, The Invisible Mile (2016 Hubert Church Prize for Fiction)
- Eleanor Catton, The Luminaries (2014 Fiction Prize)
- Amy Head, Tough (2014 Hubert Church Prize for Fiction)
- Lawrence Patchett, I Got His Blood on Me (2013 Hubert Church Prize for Fiction)
- Pip Adam, Everything We Hoped For (2011 Hubert Church Prize for Fiction)
- Kate Camp, The Mirror of Simple Annihilated Souls (2011 Poetry Award winner)
- Brian Turner, Just This (2010 Poetry Award winner)
- Anna Taylor, Relief (2010 NZSA Hubert Church Best First Book of Fiction Award Winner)
- Jenny Bornholdt, The Rocky Shore (2009 Poetry category winner)
- Richard Boast, Buying the Land, Selling the Land (2009 History category winner)
- Eleanor Catton, The Rehearsal (2009 NZSA Hubert Church Best First Book Award for Fiction)
