= Sport (New Zealand magazine) =

New Zealand literary magazine

- The cover of the first issue of Sport magazine
- Publisher and editor: Fergus Barrowman
- Frequency: Yearly
- Founder: Fergus Barrowman, Elizabeth Knox, Damien Wilkins, Nigel Cox
- Founded: 1988
- Final issue: 2019
- Based in: Wellington, New Zealand
- Website: sportmagazine.co.nz

Sport was a New Zealand literary magazine, edited and published by Fergus Barrowman. It was founded in 1988 and ran until 2019.

== History ==
Barrowman co-founded the magazine in 1988 with Elizabeth Knox, Damien Wilkins, and Nigel Cox, with support from Bill Manhire, Alan Preston and Andrew Masonin. Barrowman said in an interview in 2012 that the name Sport was intended to be a joke but that it had caused confusion: "There are lots of cultured types who've never got close enough to the magazine to know what it is, and it's hell to explain overseas. I still get misdirected orders and submissions".

At various times Sport was co-edited or guest-edited by James Brown, Catherine Chidgey, Gregory O'Brien, Sara Knox, Lara Strongman, Andrew Johnston, and Sally-Ann Spencer. It was published twice a year until November 2003, at which point it began being published annually.

=== Controversy over Creative New Zealand defunding ===
In 2013, Creative New Zealand (CNZ) announced that the magazine's yearly application for funding was unsuccessful, ending CNZ's long-term support over the last 40 issues. The announcement produced a quick reaction from a number of prominent New Zealand writers, such as Eleanor Catton and Emily Perkins.

Fergus Barrowman said in an interview on Radio New Zealand that although he had been approached with various offers of additional funding, and people had suggested he crowdfunds the journal's operations, he was wary of adding to the yearly workload of producing the journal if it was forced to rely on non-CNZ funding. Despite the withdrawal of CNZ funding, the magazine released Sport issue 42 in March 2014, and continued to publish annually until 2019.

=== Anthology and closure ===
The anthology A Game of Two Halves: The best of Sport 2005–2019 was published in November 2021. At the time of its publication, Barrowman confirmed that there would be no further issues of Sport following the 2019 edition, Sport 47.

== Legacy and influence ==
The magazine was described by fellow-Victoria University of Wellington publication Salient as "A bedrock of new New Zealand fiction, essays and poetry." It published the first works of Emily Perkins and Catherine Chidgey, as well as being an early publisher of Kate Flannery, Annamarie Jagose, Chris Orsman and Peter Wells. In 2008, Eleanor Catton's work first appeared in Sport, before the publication of her first novel The Rehearsal.

== See also ==
- Victoria University Press
- New Zealand literature
- List of print media in New Zealand
