= Damien Wilkins (writer) =

New Zealand novelist, short story writer, and poet (born 1963)

- Born: 1963 (age 62–63); Lower Hutt, Wellington, New Zealand
- Education: Victoria University of Wellington; Washington University in St. Louis (MFA)
- Occupations: Novelist; short story writer; poet
- Writing career
- Notable awards: Whiting Award (1992)

Damien Wilkins (born 1963 in Lower Hutt, New Zealand) is a New Zealand novelist, short story writer, and poet. He is the director of the International Institute of Modern Letters at Victoria University of Wellington.

== Life ==
He graduated from Victoria University of Wellington in 1984. He was assistant editor at Victoria University Press in 1988. He graduated from Washington University in St. Louis with an MFA. Since 1992 he has been a writing tutor in Wellington, New Zealand. His notable doctoral students have included Pip Adam, Michalia Arathimos, and Gigi Fenster.

Since 2014 he has been the director of the International Institute of Modern Letters at Victoria University of Wellington.

His work has appeared in Sport.

He is also a singer and songwriter who has released songs through his project the Close Readers. Previously, he played in the band the Jonahs in the 1980s.

== Awards ==
- 1989 Heinemann Reed Fiction Award
- 1992 Whiting Award
- 1994 New Zealand Book Award for Fiction
- 2013 Arts Foundation of New Zealand Laureate Award
- 2020 Young Adult Fiction Award, New Zealand Book Awards for Children and Young Adults
- 2025 Jann Medlicott Acorn Prize for Fiction at Ockham New Zealand Book Awards

== Works ==
=== Novels ===
- The Miserables. Wellington, New Zealand: Victoria University Press.
  - American edition. New York: Harcourt Brace & Co. 1993. ISBN 978-0-15-160523-1.
- Little Masters Wellington, New Zealand: Victoria University Press, 1996
  - American edition. New York: Henry Holt. 1997. ISBN 978-0-8050-4951-0.
- Nineteen Widows under Ash. Wellington, New Zealand: Victoria University Press, 2000. ISBN 9780864733955.
- Chemistry. Granta. 2002. ISBN 978-1-86207-549-8.
- The Fainter. Wellington, New Zealand: Victoria University Press, 2006. ISBN 9780864735300.
- Somebody Loves Us All. Wellington, New Zealand: Victoria University Press, 2009. ISBN 9780864736161.
- Max Gate. Wellington, New Zealand: Victoria University Press, 2013. ISBN 9780864738998.
- Dad Art. Wellington, New Zealand: Victoria University Press, 2016. ISBN 9781776560561.
- Lifting. Wellington, New Zealand: Victoria University Press, 2017. ISBN 9781776561025.
- Aspiring. Auckland, New Zealand: Massey University Press, 2020. ISBN 978-0-9951229-4-9
- Delirious, Wellington, New Zealand: Te Herenga Waka University Press, 2024. ISBN 9781776922086

=== Short stories ===
- The Veteran Perils. Auckland, New Zealand: Heinemann Reed. 1990. ISBN 978-0-7900-0124-1.
- For everyone concerned and other stories. Victoria University Press. 2008. ISBN 978-0-86473-559-1.

=== Poetry ===
- The Idles. Wellington, New Zealand: Victoria University Press. 1993. ISBN 978-0-86473-253-8.

=== Anthologies ===
- Jenny Bornholdt; Gregory O'Brien; Mark Williams, eds. (1997). An anthology of New Zealand poetry in English. Oxford University Press New Zealand. ISBN 978-0-19-558338-0.

=== Plays and scripts ===
- Duggan. Television series.
- Insiders Guide to Happiness. Television series.
- Drinking Games. Stage play.

=== Editor ===
- Great Sporting Moments: The best of Sport magazine 1988-2004, Victoria University Press, 2005.

== Albums ==
- Group Hug (Austin, 2011)
- The Lines Are Open (Austin, 2014)
