= List of New Zealand poets =

This page is a list of New Zealand poets.

== A–E ==
- Arthur Henry Adams (1872–1936)
- Fleur Adcock (1934–2024)
- Rob Allan (1945–2021)
- Rosetta Allan (living)
- Michele Amas (1961–2016)
- Isobel Andrews (1905–1990)
- K O Arvidson (1938–2011)
- Sylvia Ashton-Warner (1908–1984)
- Tusiata Avia (born 1966)
- Hinemoana Baker (born 1968)
- Serie Barford (living)
- Mary Anne Barker (Lady Barker) (1831–1911)
- John Barr (1809–1889)
- Miriam Barr (born 1982)
- Blanche Baughan (1870–1958)
- James K. Baxter (1926–1972)
- Arthur Baysting (1947–2019)
- Airini Beautrais (born 1982)
- Marlene J Bennetts (born 1938)
- Jeanne Bernhardt (born 1961)
- Ursula Bethell (1874–1945)
- Graham Billing (1936–2001)
- Victor Billot (living)
- Hera Lindsay Bird (born 1987)
- Paddy Blanchfield (1911–1980)
- Arapera Blank (1932–2002)
- Ivan Bootham (1939–2016)
- Jenny Bornholdt (born 1960)
- Michael Botur (born 1984)
- Thomas Bracken (1843–1898)
- Charles Brasch (1909–1973)
- Diana Bridge (born 1942)
- Bub Bridger (1924–2009)
- Diane Brown (born 1951)
- Audrey Brown-Pereira (born 1975)
- Rachel Bush (1941–2016)
- Bernard Cadogan (born 1961)
- Kate Camp (born 1972)
- Alistair Te Ariki Campbell (1925–2009)
- Meg Campbell (1937–2007)
- Clyde Carr (1886–1962)
- John Caselberg (1927–2004)
- Gordon Challis (born 1932–2018)
- Janet Charman (born 1954)
- Kate Clark (1847–1926)
- Geoff Cochrane (1951–2022)
- Glenn Colquhoun (born 1964)
- Jennifer Compton (born 1949)
- Kay McKenzie Cooke (born 1953)
- Violet May Cottrell (1887–1971)
- James Courage (1903–1963)
- Mary Cresswell (born 1937)
- Walter D'Arcy Cresswell (1896–1960)
- Majella Cullinane (living)
- Allen Curnow (1911–2001)
- Ruth Dallas (1919–2008)
- Lynn Davidson (born 1959)
- Jackie Davis (born 1963)
- Leigh Davis (1955–2009)
- Geoffrey Potocki de Montalk (1903–1997)
- Stephanie de Montalk (born 1945)
- Elena de Roo (living)
- John Dennison (born 1978)
- George E. Dewar (1895–1965)
- Bill Direen (born 1957)
- Alfred Domett (1811–1887)
- Basil Dowling (1910–2000)
- Sam Duckor-Jones (born 1982)
- Marilyn Duckworth (born 1935)
- Eileen Duggan (1894–1972)
- Cathie Dunsford (born 1953)
- Lynley Edmeades (living)
- Lauris Edmond (1924–2000)
- David Eggleton (born 1952)
- Chris Else (born 1942)
- Riemke Ensing (born 1939)
- Margaret Escott (1908–1977)

== F–M ==
- A. R. D. Fairburn (1904–1957)
- Fiona Farrell (born 1947)
- Joan Fleming (born 1984)
- Gary Forrester (born 1946)
- Janet Frame (1924–2004)
- Ruth France (1913–1968)
- Anne French (born 1956)
- Kathleen Gallagher (born 1957)
- Rhian Gallagher (born 1961)
- Ivy Gibbs (1886–1966)
- Ruth Gilbert (1917–2016)
- Denis Glover (1912–1980)
- Paula Green (born 1955)
- H. W. Gretton (1914–1983)
- Russell Haley (1934–2016)
- Bernadette Hall (born 1945)
- William Hart-Smith (1911–1990)
- Siobhan Harvey (born 1973)
- J. H. Haslam (1874–1969)
- Dinah Hawken (born 1943)
- Kathleen Hawkins (1883–1981)
- Joel Hayward (born 1964)
- Helen Heath (born 1970)
- Dominic Hoey (born 1977)
- Jeffrey Paparoa Holman (born 1947)
- Ani Hona (1938–1997)
- David Howard (born 1959)
- Keri Hulme (1947–2021)
- Sam Hunt (born 1946)
- Rex Hunter (1888–1960)
- Robin Hyde (pen name of Iris Wilkinson; 1906–1939)
- Kevin Ireland (1933–2023)
- Anna Jackson (born 1967)
- Michael Jackson (born 1940)
- Lynn Jenner (living)
- Stephanie Johnson (born 1961)
- Andrew Johnston (born 1963)
- Tim Jones (born 1959)
- M. K. Joseph (1914–1981)
- Simone Kaho (born 1978)
- Kapka Kassabova (born 1973)
- Jan Kemp (born 1949)
- Anne Kennedy (born 1959)
- Alice Annie Kenny (1875–1960)
- Nafanua Purcell Kersel (living)
- Fiona Kidman (born 1940)
- Saradha Koirala (born 1980)
- Eve Langley (1904–1974)
- Owen Leeming (born 1930)
- Michele Leggott (born 1956)
- Louise Wareham Leonard (born 1965)
- Terry Locke (born 1946)
- Iain Lonie (1932–1988)
- Jean Lonie (1930–1997)
- Judith Lonie (1935–1982)
- Jessie Mackay (1864–1938)
- Bill Manhire (born 1946)
- Katherine Mansfield (1888–1923)
- Janice Marriott (born 1946)
- Selina Tusitala Marsh (born 1971)
- R. A. K. Mason (1905–1971)
- Rachel McAlpine (born 1940)
- Gary McCormick (born 1951)
- Carolyn McCurdie (living)
- Frankie McMillan (born 1950)
- Heather McPherson (1942–2017)
- Cilla McQueen (born 1949)
- Courtney Sina Meredith (born 1986)
- Rowan Metcalfe (1955–2003)
- Karlo Mila (born 1974)
- Barry Mitcalfe (1930–1986)
- David Mitchell (1940–2001)
- Tze Ming Mok (born 1978)
- Kelly Ana Morey (1968–2025)
- Michael Morrissey (born 1942)
- Alan Mulgan (1881–1962)
- John Mulgan (1911–1945)

== N–Z ==
- Elizabeth Nannestad (born 1956)
- Emma Neale (born 1969)
- Janet Newman (living)
- John Newton (born 1959)
- Marjory Nicholls (1890–1930)
- Jay Nieuwland (born 1990)
- Mikaela Nyman (born 1966)
- Michael O'Leary (born 1950)
- Peter Olds (1944–2023)
- W. H. Oliver (1925–2015)
- Alistair Paterson (born 1929)
- Evelyn Patuawa-Nathan (1933–2019)
- Mark Pirie (born 1974)
- Vivienne Plumb (born 1955)
- Robert J. Pope (1865–1949)
- Nina Mingya Powles (born 1993)
- Joanna Preston (born 1972)
- Chris Price (born 1962)
- Elizabeth Pulford (born 1943)
- Maggie Rainey-Smith (born 1950)
- Maraea Rakuraku (living)
- essa may ranapiri (born 1993/4)
- Gloria Rawlinson (1918–1995)
- William Pember Reeves (1857–1932)
- Harry Ricketts (born 1950)
- Elspeth Sandys (born 1940)
- Rosie Scott (1948–2017)
- William Sewell (1951–2003)
- Iain Sharp (born 1953)
- Helen Lilian Shaw (1913–1985)
- Keith Sinclair (1922–1993)
- Tracey Slaughter (born 1972)
- Anna Smaill (born 1979)
- Elizabeth Smither (born 1941)
- Kendrick Smithyman (1922–1995)
- Ruby Solly (born 1996)
- Laura Solomon (1974–2019)
- C. K. Stead (born 1932)
- Jacquie Sturm (1927–2009)
- Robert Sullivan (born 1967)
- Leilani Tamu (living)
- Apirana Taylor (born 1955)
- Grace Taylor (living)
- Tayi Tibble (born 1995)
- Mona Tracy (1892–1959)
- Chris Tse (born 1982)
- Brian Turner (1944–2025)
- Hone Tuwhare (1922–2008)
- Arnold Wall (1869–1966)
- Louise Wallace (born 1983)
- Kirsten Warner (born 1956)
- Ian Wedde (born 1946)
- Albert Wendt (born 1939)
- Tom Weston (born 1958)
- Reina Whaitiri (born 1943)
- Damien Wilkins (born 1963)
- Mark Williams (born 1951)
- Vernice Wineera (1938–2024)
- Iona Winter (living)
- Alison Wong (born 1960)
- Susan Wood (1836–1880)
- Sue Wootton (born 1961)
- Niel Wright (born 1933)
- Sonja Yelich (born 1965)
- Ashleigh Young (born 1983)

== See also ==
- New Zealand literature
- List of New Zealand writers
