= Kathleen Grattan Prize for a Sequence of Poems =

The Kathleen Grattan Prize for a Sequence of Poems is an annual award for a cycle or sequence of poems with a common link or theme. It is named after Kathleen Grattan, an Auckland poet, who died in 1990. The award was first made in 2009.

== History ==
The Kathleen Grattan Prize for a Sequence of Poems is funded by a bequest from the Jocelyn Grattan Charitable Trust.

Jocelyn Grattan was the daughter of Kathleen Grattan, an Auckland poet, journalist and former editor of the New Zealand Woman's Weekly. When Jocelyn Grattan died in 2005, she left Landfall a bequest with which to establish an award in her mother’s name (the Kathleen Grattan Award). She also wanted her mother’s love of poetry to be recognised by an annual competition for a sequence or cycle of poems. This competition is run by the International Writers‘ Workshop NZ Inc (IWW).

The inaugural award was made in 2009 and the award is made every year.

== Eligibility and conditions ==
- The award is open to members of International Writers’ Workshop (IWW).
- Entrants should be normally living in New Zealand and must not have won the Prize in the previous three years.
- The entry should be a cycle or sequence of poems with a common link or theme, but with no limit on length.
- Poems must be the entrant’s original and completely unpublished work.
- The winner receives a monetary prize (at present $1,000) and a certificate.

== List of winners ==
- 2009: Alice Hooton (America)
- 2010: Janet Charman (Mother won’t come to us); Rosetta Allan (Capricious Memory)
- 2011: Jillian Sullivan (how to live it)
- 2012: James Norcliffe (What do you call your male parent?)
- 2013: Belinda Diepenheim (Bittercress and Flax)
- 2014: Julie Ryan (On Visiting Old Ladies)
- 2015: Maris O'Rourke (Motherings); Highly Commended — Sue Wootton (Typewriter Songs)
- 2016: Michael Giacon (Argento in no man land)
- 2017: Janet Newman (Tender); Runner-up — Anne Hollier Ruddy (Ambushed by Gauguin)
- 2018: Heather Bauchop (The Life in Small Deaths); Runner-up — Gillian Roach (She’s over there, love)
- 2019: Siobhan Harvey (Ghosts); Runner-up – Gillian Roach (Mute as Bottles)
- 2020: Liz Breslin (In bed with the feminists); Runner-up – Sophia Wilson (Attempting to Land)
- 2021: Robyn Maree Pickens (Juniper); Runners-up – Kerrin Sharpe (Te hau o te atua/The breath of heaven) and Marie McGuigan (The Goose Wing)
- 2022: Margaret Moores; Runner-up – Lincoln Jacques
- 2023: Caroline Masters; Runner-up – Sarah Scott

== See also ==
- Kathleen Grattan Award
- List of New Zealand literary awards
