= John McLean (artist) =

New Zealand artist and environmentalist (1944–2023)

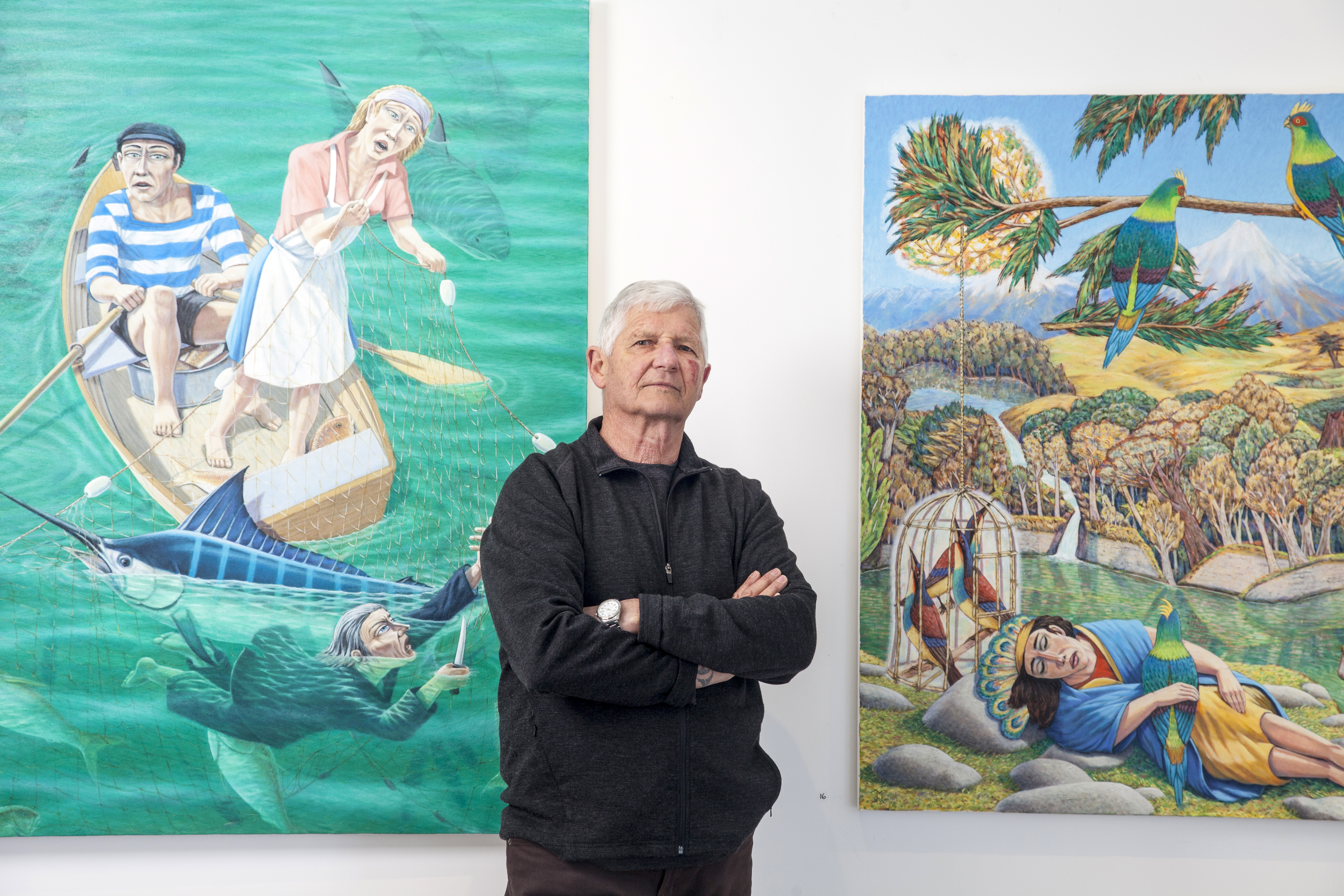
Painter John McLean in his studio in North Taranaki, New Zealand, in 2016. Behind him to the right is his painting Bird Catcher Dreaming

John Douglas McLean (14 October 1944 – 27 August 2023) was a New Zealand figurative painter, stone sculptor, wood carver, author, and environmentalist. He lived and worked in Urenui, North Taranaki, and by the end of his life was known for his richly allegorical style. McLean exhibited in New Zealand, Japan, New York and Australia, and work is held in private and public collections.

== Personal life ==
John McLean was born in Tauranga. His future partner Chris emigrated from Switzerland to New Zealand with her family when she was nine, and she also grew up in Tauranga. The couple married when McLean was teaching in Auckland, and moved to Te Akau in 1969-70.

McLean's father was a carpet layer and his mother also worked. He described his parents: "They were pretty poor. It was an era where they had come through a world war and depression. A lot of children whose parents were tradespeople were given opportunities they hadn't and my parents didn't understand art – it wasn’t part of their life at all."

Although McLean's interest was art, his parents wanted him to get a "real job", and so, at their insistence, he trained as a teacher and taught in several schools between 1963 and 1970. He left full-time work to become an artist in 1976.

In the 1960s, McLean was conscripted into the New Zealand Army. He refused service in the Vietnam War, and was granted conscientious objector status. According to McLean's wife Chris: "He refused to use religious reasons to avoid going to war; he just flatly refused to go."

In 1978, the McLeans moved to their first house at Mimi.

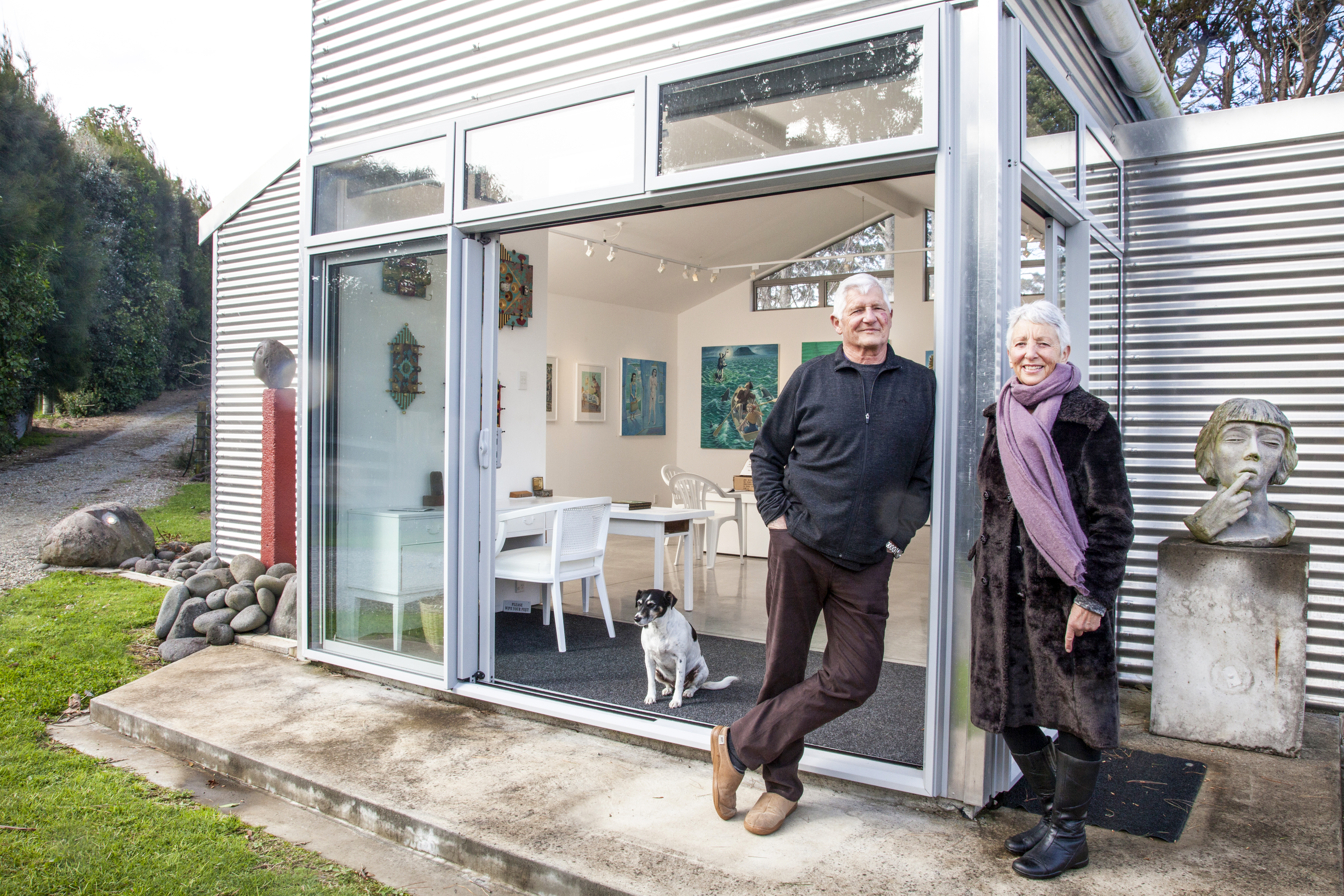
John and Chris McLean outside their studio in North Taranaki

In 1985, John and Chris McLean bought a 16-hectare (40-acre) farmlet overlooking the sea at Pukearuhe in North Taranaki, and tried to live as self-sufficiently as possible. The couple and their neighbour, the sculptor Howard Tuffery, replanted the riverbanks and wetlands with thousands of native trees, and protected those areas under a QEII covenant. The couple found the remains of Māori waka on the shore below their house which were dated to circa 1300.

The couple had three children: Taranaki artist Kirsty McLean; Juliet, a singer and musician; and Gregor, an environmental consultant.

As chair of the North Taranaki Awa Protection Society, McLean spent years fighting a controversial North Taranaki composting business.

McLean died suddenly in his studio on 27 August 2023.

== Career ==
Between 1976 and 1986, McLean worked in a series of part-time jobs while painting, before becoming a full-time drawing and painting tutor at Taranaki Polytechnic (now the Western Institute of Technology). After a break from 1993 to 1997, he briefly returned to part-time teaching at the institute.

At the beginning of his painting career, McLean was mentored by the Taranaki artist Michael Smither for years from the age of 30. Influenced by Smither, McLean painted as a super-realist for 20 years. He then became interested in Jungian ideas about the unconscious, and switched to a figurative 'narrative style'. "I like to think that the paintings which result from this can function as visual parable or allegory."

As a sculptor, McLean habitually worked in Taranaki andesite. He worked on sculptures for film, including The Last Samurai, The Lion, The Witch and the Wardrobe, and Prince Caspian. In 2000, he became chairman of the Te Kupenga Stone Sculpture Society. The society hosts biennial stone sculpture symposia on the New Plymouth foreshore.

McLean won the 2007 Norsewear Art Award for his painting Farmer's Wife Departs with Traveller.

In 2012, McLean built and opened an art gallery next to his house in Mimi, to exhibit his own work, and that of his family (his daughter Kirsty and his partner Chris are also artists).

In 2015, McLean published a 'contemporary fairytale', an illustrated book based on his exhibition The Farmer's Wife and The Farmer at Puke Ariki, New Plymouth, in 2010.
