= Michael Smither =

New Zealand painter and composer (born 1939)

Michael Smither CNZM
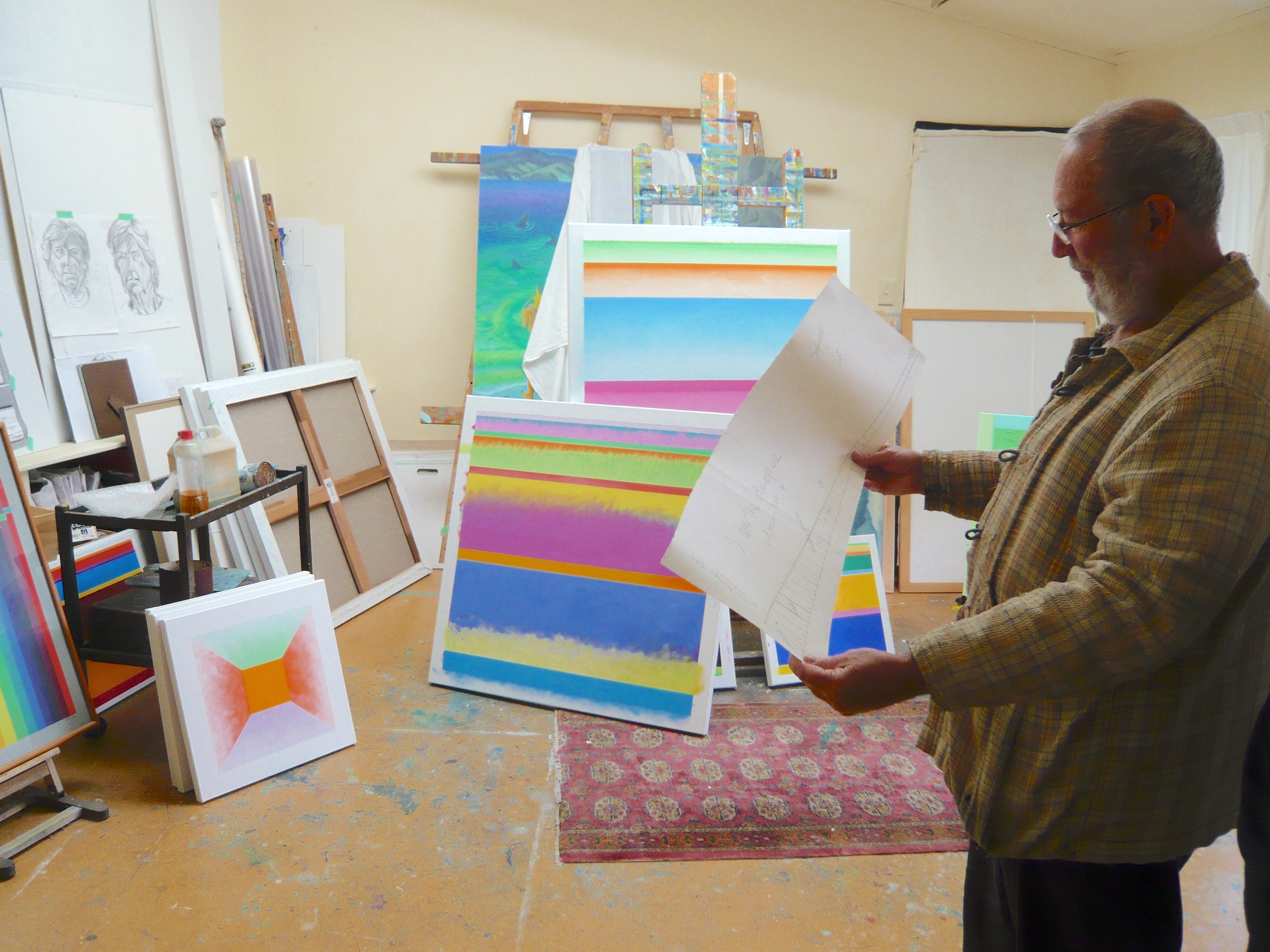
- Smither in his Otama Beach studio, 2009
- Born: Michael Duncan Smither; 29 October 1939 (age 87); New Zealand
- Education: Elam School of Fine Arts
- Known for: Painting, print making and musical composition
- Style: Modernist
- Awards: Frances Hodgkins Fellowship (1970)

Michael Duncan Smither CNZM (born 29 October 1939) is a New Zealand painter and composer.

== Background ==
Smither was born in New Plymouth and was educated at New Plymouth Boys' High School and Elam School of Fine Arts, Auckland. While studying he worked part-time in a car spray-paint shop, an occupation which introduced Smither to the use of lacquer-based paints.

In 1959, Smither returned to New Plymouth, working part-time in arts-related jobs. His first solo exhibition was in 1961. In 1963 he married the poet Elizabeth Smither (née Harrington) and they had three children.

Smither separated from Elizabeth and eventually divorced. For a few years he was married to Rachel McAlpine, a writer. Smither now lives at Otama beach on the Coromandel Peninsula.

Smither was also influenced by Rita Angus and Lois White as he was studying. He turned to them for inspiration. Despite experiencing a minor stroke in 2014 and suffering from shingles, Michael Smither continues to paint and has no plans to stop anytime soon. "I would rather die with my brush in my hand or boots on of whatever you like to call it. There's no attraction to me in the idea of retiring and going on long holidays overseas and stuff like that. To me, I've always had to have a quotient of art involved in whatever it is I am doing. It's either music or painting or sculpture or environmental efforts." He used to trade his artwork for boxes of groceries to keep his family feed.

== Work ==
Smither works in a variety of media - notably oils, acrylics, and screenprint - and on a variety of subjects. Domestic life is a major theme of many of his works, these scenes depicted with a rigorous yet idiosyncratic realism. A similar style is brought to his landscapes, many of which depict the Taranaki landscape around which he grew up. At least two of his paintings, The Family in the Van and Rocks with Mountain have attained the status of iconic paintings in New Zealand. Rocks with Mountain is held by the Auckland Art Gallery. Smither notes that he sold the Family in the Van for $300 after deducting commission in the early 1970s. It then sold in 2012 for $200,000.

In the 1960s, Smither worked with his father Bill Smither producing many different screenprints. Screenprinting was not considered an "art" at this stage. After the death of his father in 1985, Smither did not produce any screenprints for several years. Mount Taranaki is a frequent image in his screenprints.

Smither's paintings are characterised as being of a representational, hard-edged style. His approach has changed over the years, with his more recent works having more attention spent on the details of objects, people and places.

Smither is the patron of a community art gallery, Real Tart, in New Plymouth. He has influenced artists such as John McLean.

== Exhibitions ==
His first solo exhibition was in 1961. He had a comprehensive survey exhibition developed by the Govett-Brewster Art Gallery in New Plymouth and toured through New Zealand in 1986 and a major exhibition in 2005 curated by the Auckland Art Gallery entitled The Wonder Years that also toured the country. His paintings appear in the collections of the Auckland Art Gallery Toi O Tamaki, Te Papa Tongarewa in Wellington and the Waikato Museum amongst others

=== Selected exhibition history ===
1965

- New Zealand Painting 1965 (group show) Auckland Art Gallery - toured
- Pan Pacific Arts Festival (group show) Christchurch

1966

- Shows in Australia at the Argus Gallery.

1967

- The Group (group show) Durham Street Art Gallery Christchurch.

1968

- Religious Paintings and Drawings Barry Lett Galleries, Auckland

1969

- Michael Smither: Paintings. Smither's first solo exhibition with Peter McLeavey and the fifth to exhibit in McLeavey’s Cuba Street Gallery. He would have 12 solo shows with the dealer including his 14 Stations of the Cross in Memory of Rita Angus the following year.
- Exhibition of New Zealand Modern Art (group show) Smithsonian Institution, Washington

1970

- Michael Smither: Frances Hodgkins Fellow 1970 Otago Museum Foyer, Dunedin1973
- Michael Smither: Domestic Paintings Govett-Brewster Art Gallery, New Plymouth

1971

- Earth/Earth (group show) Barry Lett Galleries, Auckland.
- 111 Views of Mount Egmont (group show) Govett-Brewster Art Gallery, New Plymouth.

1977

- You, Me, Us (group exhibition) Rororua City Art Gallery.

1978

- The Govett-Brewster’s Great Show of purchases over 10 turbulent years (group show) Govett Brewster Gallery, New Plymouth.

1980

- Polyphonic Chords, Dowse Art Gallery, Lower Hutt

1981

- Rocks Revisited and Political Statements Te Awamutu Arts Festival.

1984

- Anxious Images: Aspects of Recent New Zealand Art (group show) Auckland Art Gallery curated by Alexa Johnston.
- Michael Smither: an Introduction Govett-Brewster Art Gallery (toured).

1992

- Headlands: Thinking Through New Zealand Art Museum of Contemporary Art (group show), Sydney.
- Dream Collectors: One Hundred Years of Art in New Zealand (group show) Te Papa Tongarewa / Museum of New Zealand, Wellington.

2005

- Michael Smither: the Wonder Years Auckland Art Gallery Toi o Tāmaki.

== Selected works ==
- Portrait of my Wife 1966 view
- Railway Station Bridge and Old Step 1967 view
- Rocks with Mountain 1968 view
- Large Composition with Harry Folding Napkin 1968 view
- Sarah with Yellow Ball 1971 view
- Rubber Gloves 1977 view )
- Six Views of Back Beach 1983 view
- Big Ocitty 1984 view

== Book covers ==
- Cover of Maurice Shadbolt’s book This Summer’s Dolphin. (1968)
- Cover for Rachel McAlpine’s novel Limits of Green. (1986)

== Record auction results ==
Smither set the record for the most expensive painting sold that was painted by a living New Zealand artist when his 1967 painting entitled Sea Wall and Kingfisher sold for $342,000 in October 2019. This was eclipsed in December 2022, when his painting entitled Two Rock Pools sold under the hammer for $516,000.

In 2019, Smither's painting of Saint Francis and the Wolf sold at auction for $240,000. The painting took almost 12 years to complete and incorporates Smither's Catholic faith, telling the story of St Francis of Assisi and a wolf that terrorized the Umbrian town of Gubbio in 1220. Saint Francis and the Wolf are sitting below ferns with the wolf staring out at the viewer while Saint Francis has his eyes closed.

A 1993 painting Large Still Life with Green Plastic Plate also sold in 2019 for $180,000. This painting of a benchtop covering with cooking implements drying with shadows cast on the bench was described as expressing "the way these rhythms [between object and space] exist equally in the details of daily life as they do in the great natural formations of land and mountains".

Smither's 2001 painting of The Manifesto Café and Wine Bar, a well known venue in the 1990s on Auckland's Queen Street sold in auction in 2020 for $131,600. With its references to Edward Hopper's Nighthawks, Michael Smither describes it as a proposal of marriage between the seated couple "witnessed in a sidelong glance".

== Music compositions ==
- 21 Piano Pieces (1968–1978)
- Four Pieces for violin and viola (1974)
- Geometric Scores for piano (1975, revised 1976)
- Polyphonic Chords for four players (1980); originally intended for 4 cellos
- Cello for Pamela Gray for solo cello (1981)

== Performances ==
- Back Beach Time with Jamie Bull (1984). The Christchurch Press described it as a, ‘four-dimensional experience, employing movement, visuals, sound and time.
- End of Times Chimes with Jamie Bull for the Christchurch Arts Festival (1984). The performance referenced the swamp that Christchurch is built on and how the natural harmony of that environment was destroyed.
- Music for Rachel McAlpine’s play An Exceedingly Popular Play (1986)

== House in Parnell, Auckland ==
Smither painted an aquatic-themed mural on the staircase and entranceway to a house in Takutai Street, Parnell, over a 10-year period in the 1970s when he would come around to visit friends who lived in the house. The house (complete with the art work) sold in an auction for $4.18 million in May 2021. The new owner was "absolutely ecstatic" about the artwork.

== Books ==
Smither had many books of his art, with just one of them being Michael Smither - Painter.

== Honours and awards ==
Smither was the recipient of the 1970 Frances Hodgkins Fellowship from the University of Otago. In the 2004 Queen's Birthday Honours, he was appointed a Companion of the New Zealand Order of Merit, for services to the arts.
