= Joe Filemu =

- Full name: John Filemu
- Born: 16 July 1974 (age 52) Wellington, New Zealand
- Height: 5 ft 10 in (178 cm)
- Weight: 198 lb (90 kg)

Rugby union career
- Position: Scrum-half
Provincial / State sides
Years	Team	Apps	(Points)
1995–96	Wellington	12	(25)
Super Rugby
Years	Team	Apps	(Points)
1996	Hurricanes	1	(0)
International career
Years	Team	Apps	(Points)
1995–01	Samoa	22	(5)

John "Joe" Filemu (born 16 July 1974) is a New Zealand-Samoan former professional rugby union player.

Born in Wellington, Filemu attended Bishop Viard College growing up. He was a NZ under-21s representative halfback in 1995 and got capped by the Hurricanes in a 1996 Super 12 match against the Natal Sharks at Athletic Park.

Filemu competed in 22 Tests for Samoa between 1995 and 2001, playing twice against the All Blacks. He missed a place in the 1999 Rugby World Cup due to a contract issue with Japanese club Mitsubishi, where he played and worked.
