= Horowhenua College =

Location
- Weraroa Road; Levin 5510; New Zealand; 40.62142°S 175.27972°E

Information
- Type: State co-ed Secondary (Year 9–13)
- Motto: French: Essayez (Strive)
- Established: 1940
- Ministry of Education Institution no.: 236
- Principal: Grant Congdon
- Enrolment: 885 (July 2026)
- Socio-economic decile: 3H
- Website: www.horowhenua.school.nz

Horowhenua College is a state co-educational secondary school located in Levin, New Zealand. The school has 885 students from Years 9 to 13 (ages 12 to 18) as of July 2026. It was opened in 1940, replacing the secondary school department of Levin School. It is the oldest college in the Horowhenua District.

== History ==
Horowhenua College has its origins in Levin School, a primary school established in 1890. It was the first school in the Levin area. Levin School incorporated a high school from 1905 until 1939, when it returned to primary only ahead of the opening of Horowhenua College.

== Enrolment ==
As of July 2026, Horowhenua College has roll of 885 students, of which 326 (36.8%) identify as Māori.

As of 2026, the school has an Equity Index of 495, placing it amongst schools whose students have many socioeconomic barriers to achievement (roughly equivalent to deciles 2 and 3 under the former socio-economic decile system).

== Buildings ==
The main building of the college, known as A Block, is registered as a historic place by Heritage New Zealand.

== Notable alumni ==
- Bob Bell – politician
- Fraser Colman – politician
- Darren Hughes – politician
- Mike Minogue – actor and presenter
- Johnathan Parkes – jockey
- Codie Taylor – rugby union player
- Janet Newman – poetry author

== Notable staff ==
- Christopher Small (1927–2011), musician and author of influential books and articles on musicology, sociomusicology, and ethnomusicology
