= Saradha Koirala =

NZ poet and writer

Saradha Koirala (born 19 July 1980) is a New Zealand poet and writer based in Melbourne, Australia. She is the author of four poetry collections and two young adult novels. Koirala also writes literature reviews and has interviewed international authors and covered events such as the Auckland Writers & Readers Festival. She was the convening judge for the Mary and Peter Biggs Award for Poetry in the 2022 Ockham New Zealand Book Awards.

== Background ==
Koirala was born York, England to a New Zealand mother and Nepali father. She grew up in Nelson, New Zealand and was educated at Otago University receiving a Bachelor of Arts in English and later qualified as a secondary school teacher with a Graduate Diploma in Teaching from Victoria University of Wellington. In 2007, Koirala completed the highly regarded Master of Creative Writing at Victoria's International Institute of Modern Letters under visiting tutor Dora Malech. Koirala is also a member of the New Zealand Society of Authors and the Academy of New Zealand Literature.

== Publications ==
- Wit of the Staircase (poetry) Steele Roberts Aotearoa, 2009 ISBN 978-1-877448-42-3
- Tear Water Tea (poetry) Steele Roberts Aotearoa, 2013 ISBN 978-1-927242-04-9
- Lonesome When You Go (YA fiction) Mākaro Press, 2016 ISBN 978-0-9941237-4-9
- Photos of the Sky (poetry) The Cuba Press, 2018 ISBN 978-0-9951107-4-8
- Learning to love Blue (YA fiction) Record Press, 2021 ISBN 978-0-6451993-0-7
- The Good Days (poetry) Both Sides Books, 2025 ISBN 978-0-6451993-3-8

== Awards ==
Lonesome When You Go received a Storylines Notable Book Award, 2017

Learning to love Blue won the Young Adult Fiction Award in the 2022 New Zealand Book Awards for Children and Young Adults
