= Michael Harlow =

New Zealand poet

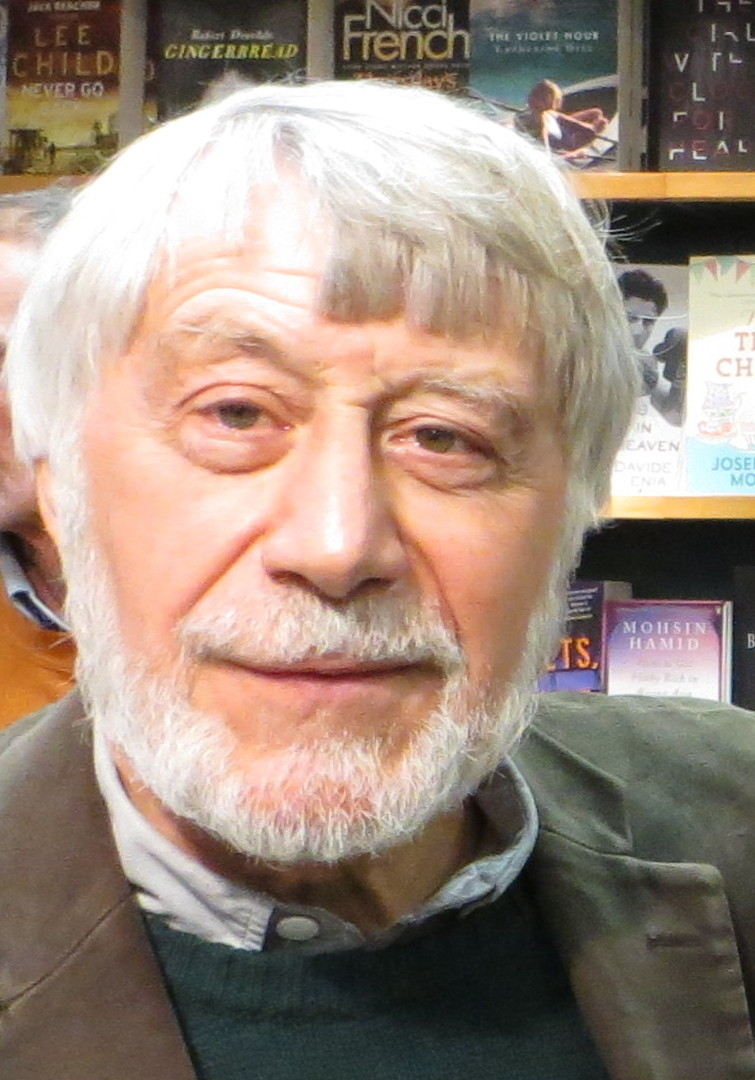
- Michael Harlow in Dunedin in 2014
- Born: 1937 (age 88–89); New England, United States of America
- Occupations: Writer, poet, editor, publisher, librettist, jungian therapist
- Writing career
- Notable works: Giotto's Elephant, The Tram Conductor's Blue Cap

Michael Harlow (born 1937) is a poet, publisher, editor and librettist. A recipient of the Katherine Mansfield Menton Fellowship (1986) and the University of Otago Robert Burns Fellowship (2009), he has twice been a poetry finalist in the New Zealand Book Awards. In 2018 he was awarded the Prime Minister's Award for Literary Achievement, alongside playwright Renée and critic and curator Wystan Curnow Harlow has published 12 books of poetry and one book on writing poetry.

== Life ==
Michael Harlow was born in the United States of America. He is of Greek and Ukrainian heritage. Harlow came to New Zealand in 1968. His work has been translated into French, Italian, Greek, Spanish, German and Romanian.

== Literary work ==
Michael Harlow's first collection, Poems, appeared in 1965. A second collection, Edges, followed in 1974. In an author's note at the collection's start, Harlow writes, "A poem writes me as much as I it. A simple enough but political idea, too. I'm fairly certain there are poems around us all the time." Printed in a variety of typefaces, the poems in Edges overtly reference a number of important twentieth-century artists, including Kurt Schwitters, Paul Klee, and Constantine P. Cavafy. Several poems are dedicated to fellow writers, including Christopher Middleton, Robert Lax, William Packard, and Margarita Karapanou.

Harlow's next collection, Nothing but Switzerland and Lemonade (1980), was his first to be published in New Zealand; it was designed and printed by Alan Loney. Nothing but Switzerland and Lemonade is also the first book of prose poems published in New Zealand. In 1981, Harlow published Today is the Piano's Birthday with Auckland University Press. With the exception of the title work – a prose poem previously published in Nothing but Switzerland – the poems in Today are written in more traditional stanzaic forms or in free verse.

Vlaminck's Tie followed in 1985. The collection is divided into four parts: a group of love poems; an assembly of prose and poetry exploring Jungian and Freudian concepts, dedicated to Elizabeth Smither; the title work, which takes as its starting point a colorful, wooden necktie that artist Maurice de Vlaminck wore; and finally a section of poems and illustrations that playfully reimagine elocution exercises. Writing in Landfall in March 1986, the poet Murray Edmond commented, "The writing in Vlaminck's Tie can be shown to raise problems about itself which it doesn't solve, but at the same time it is necessary to admit that in Harlow we have a very active writing intelligence, which is working at the problems of writing itself." Edmond recommended the volume "as an active reading experience from an inventive performer."

Harlow's 1986 volume Take a Risk, Trust Your Language, Make a Poem received the PEN/NZ Best First Book of Prose. His 1991 poetry collection Giotto's Elephant was a Poetry finalist in the 1991 New Zealand Book Awards.

By this point in his career, Harlow had established himself as an important if unconventional poet. In The Oxford History of New Zealand Literature in English (1991), Elizabeth Caffin grouped Harlow with Brian Turner as “poets writing outside the prevailing fashion.” Harlow, she continued, “was burdened by neither English nor New Zealand tradition; working, from a background of Jungian psychology, with dreams and fantasy, he produced calculated performances in a range of forms from prose poem to lyric.” Writing in The Oxford Companion to New Zealand Literature (1998), Janet Wilson identified a “Eurocentrism” in Harlow's works, as well as a “whimsical, questioning persona, and a persistent engagement with the workings of the unconscious.”

Harlow's next collection, Cassandra's Daughter, appeared in 2005.

Harlow's eighth poetry volume, The Tram Conductor's Blue Cap was published in 2009. The volume opens with an epigraph from German-French Abstract artist Jean Arp: "Things that are familiar depend on this magical, almost impossible subworld." This epigraph introduces the playful tone of the collection. The Tram Conductor’s Blue Cap makes frequent allusions to Ancient Greece, with references to Asclepios, Plato and Troy, as well as poems titled "Translating Narcissus" and "Anecdotal Aesthetics in Athens." There are also Biblical overtones, in poems like "Canticle" and "The Parson's Sermon." The title poem is dedicated to Christopher Middleton, to whom Harlow also dedicated poetry in his 1974 collection, Edges. The collection's second poem, "In a Field of Snow," written in a sonnet form, won first prize in the 5th Bravado International Poetry Competition in 2008. In her review of the collection, Janet Hughes wrote that Harlow "dances between and elides narrative and fable, metaphor and symbol, emotion and observation, the world and the inner life, putting the reflexive tools of postmodernism at the service of life understood through the definitively modern lens of psychotherapy." Terry Locke, reviewing the collection for English in Aotearoa, described Harlow as "at the peak of his powers" and as someone who is "in the top echelon of New Zealand poets currently practicing their craft." The collection was a poetry finalist in the 2010 New Zealand Post Book awards.

Two collections appeared in 2014. Heart absolutely I can brings together a number of Harlow's previously published poems on love, along with five new works. Sweeping the Courtyard: The Selected Poems of Michael Harlow gathers a generous selection of his published poetry, from Edges (1974) to The Tram Conductor's Blue Cap (2009).

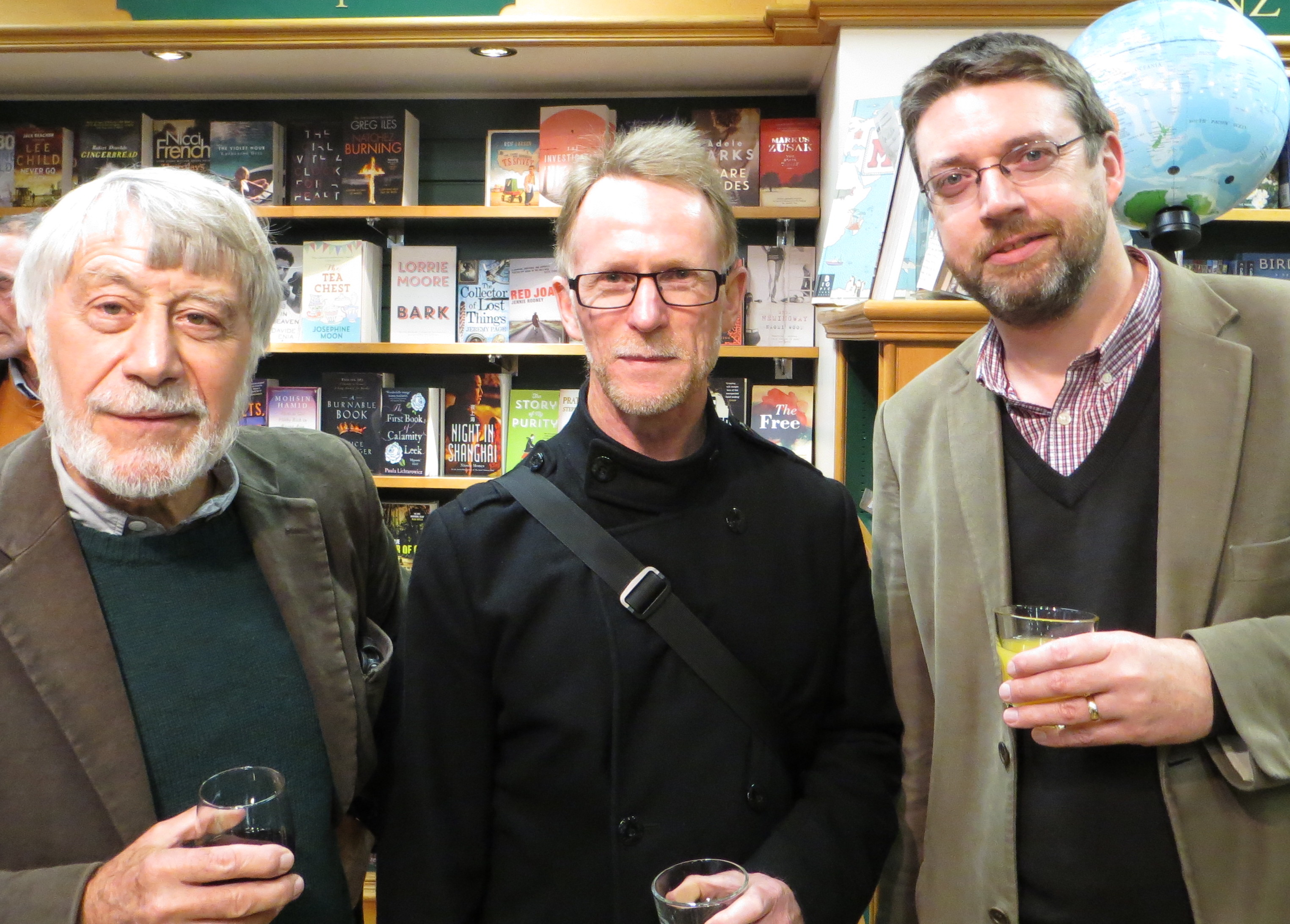
Writers Michael Harlow, David Howard, and Liam McIlvanney in Dunedin, New Zealand, April 2014.

In 2016 Michael Harlow published his eleventh poetry collection, Nothing for it but to Sing. Previous to its publication, it received the 2015 Kathleen Grattan Award, which is biennially given to "an original book-length collection of poetry by a New Zealand or South Pacific permanent resident or citizen." Nothing for it but to Sing contrasts concrete imagery with the abstract and further demonstrates Harlow's reluctance to be restricted to working in one style. Fuelled by his musical background and his understanding that “Poetry is when words sing,” the poems display lyric and rhythmic qualities characteristic of Harlow's previous work. The book also draws upon Harlow's background as a Jungian therapist, as many of the poems reflect the intangibility of their subject matter: existence, temporality, love, and mortality. Responding to the collection, Emma Neale wrote that “Harlow’s poems are small detonations that release deeply complex stories of psychological separations and attractions, of memory and desire.”

Nothing for it but to Sing was generally well received. In his review for the journal takahē, Erik Kennedy concluded, “It may be wrong to say that Nothing for it but to Sing is an uneven book. Perhaps it’s better to say that it’s an ambitious and uncompromising hybrid of varied efforts. And who’s going to complain about that?” In her review for NZ Poetry Shelf, Paula Green wrote, “This shiny, ethereal collection, full of paradox and light, follows curved lines, follows song. The poems are written out of being and unbeing, out of the unconscious and the dreamed world, out of lived experience. More than anything, it almost seems like there are no things but in ideas, because this is poetry of an itinerant mind, of a heart absorbing a world that is hypothesis, abstract thought, love, attachment and continuity.” She concludes by deeming it “a very lovely, overturning, uplifting collection”.

Harlow's most recent poetry collections include The Moon in a Bowl of Water (2019) and Renoir's Bicycle (2022).

Over a long career, Michael Harlow has remained an important figure in New Zealand poetry. As New Zealand author Fiona Kidman has written, "Harlow is a distinguished and serious writer, dealing with big issues: life, death, sorrow, the inner consciousness, yet there is a bubble of gaiety, a vitality, never far from the surface".

== Bibliography ==
=== Poetry ===
- Poems (Agora Press, 1965)
- Edges (Lycabettus Press, 1974)
- Nothing But Switzerland and Lemonade (Hawk Press, 1980)
- Today is the Piano's Birthday (Auckland University Press, 1981)
- Vlaminck's Tie (Auckland University Press, 1985)
- Giotto's Elephant (John McIndoe, 1991)
- Cassandra's Daughter (Auckland University Press, 2005)
- The Tram Conductor's Blue Cap (Auckland University Press, 2009 – poetry finalist in the 2010 New Zealand Post Book awards)
- Sweeping the Courtyard: The Selected Poems of Michael Harlow (Cold Hub Press, 2014)
- Heart absolutely I can (Makaro Press, 2014)
- Nothing For It But To Sing (Otago University Press, 2016)
- The Moon in a Bowl of Water (Otago University Press, 2019)
- Renoir's Bicycle: a collection of prose poems (Cold Hub Press, 2022)

=== Prose ===
- Take a Risk, Trust Your Language, Make a Poem (1986)

== Awards and nominations ==
- PEN/NZ Best First Book of Prose for Take a Risk, Trust Your Language, Make a Poem (1986)
- Writing Bursaries, 1977, 1990
- Katherine Mansfield Memorial Fellow/NZ Cultural Ambassador, 1986–1987
- New Zealand-Australian Exchange Fellow, 1991
- Poetry finalist in the 1991 New Zealand Book Awards for Giotto's Elephant
- Randell Cottage Writer in Residence, 2004
- NZPS International Poetry Competition, 3rd Prize, 2005
- Takahe Poetry Prize, 2006
- 2008 Bravado International Poetry Prize
- Robert Burns Fellow at the University of Otago, 2009
- Inaugural Caselberg Trust Artist in Residence, 2009
- Wallace Artist/Writer in Residence, 2011–2012
- Poetry finalist in the 2010 New Zealand Post Book awards for The Tram Conductor's Blue Cap (Auckland University Press 2009)
- The Lauris Edmond Memorial Award for Distinguished Contributions to Poetry, 2014
- Kathleen Grattan Poetry Prize 2015 for Nothing For It But To Sing
- NZSA Peter & Dianne Beatson Fellowship, 2016
- 2018 Prime Minister's Award for Literary Achievement
