= Janet Newman =

New Zealand poet

Personal details
- Born: Levin
- Education: Massey University (PHD), Horowhenua College

Janet Newman is a poet, farmer and former journalist based in the Horowhenua District of New Zealand. She has published two poetry books; Koe: An Aotearoa ecopoetry anthology (editor, with Robert Sullivan) and Unseasoned Campaigner, both published by Otago University Press. She won the 2015 New Zealand Poetry Society International Competition and the 2017 Kathleen Grattan Prize for a Sequence of Poems. She has written a doctoral thesis on the Traditions of Ecopoetry in Aotearoa/New Zealand at Massey University. Her book, Unseasoned Campaigner, won the 2022 New Zealand Society of Authors Heritage Book Award for Poetry. She was also a runner-up in the 2019 Kathleen Grattan Awards. Her essays have won the Journal of New Zealand Literature Prize for New Zealand Literary Studies in 2016 and 2014.

Newman has a Master of Cultural and Creative Practice and a PhD, both from Massey University.
