= Lisa Ellis (political scientist) =

Political scientist and philosopher

- Born: Elisabeth Ellis
- Occupations: Political scientist and philosopher

Academic background
- Education: Princeton University
- Alma mater: University of California, Berkeley
- Thesis: (1999)

Academic work
- Institutions: University of Otago
- Doctoral students: Bridie Lonie

Elisabeth Ellis, known as Lisa Ellis, is an American-born New Zealand political theorist and professor in the Department of Politics and Department of Philosophy at the University of Otago. Ellis is director of the Philosophy, Politics, and Economics (PPE) programme at the University of Otago.

== Academic career ==
Ellis graduated with a BA (1990) from Princeton University and an MA (1992) and PhD (1999) from University of California, Berkeley. She joined the University of Otago as associate professor in January 2014 and was promoted to full professor in December 2018 with effect from 1 February 2019. Notable students include Bridie Lonie.

== Selected works ==
- Ellis, Elisabeth (2005), Kant's politics : provisional theory for an uncertain world, Yale University Press, ISBN 978-0-300-10120-1
- Ellis, Elisabeth (2008), Provisional politics : Kantian arguments in policy context, Yale University Press, ISBN 978-0-300-12522-1
- Ellis, Elisabeth, ed. (2012), Kant's Political Theory: Interpretations and applications, Pennsylvania State University Press, ISBN 978-0-271-05987-7
