= Rachel McAlpine =

New Zealand poet, novelist and playwright

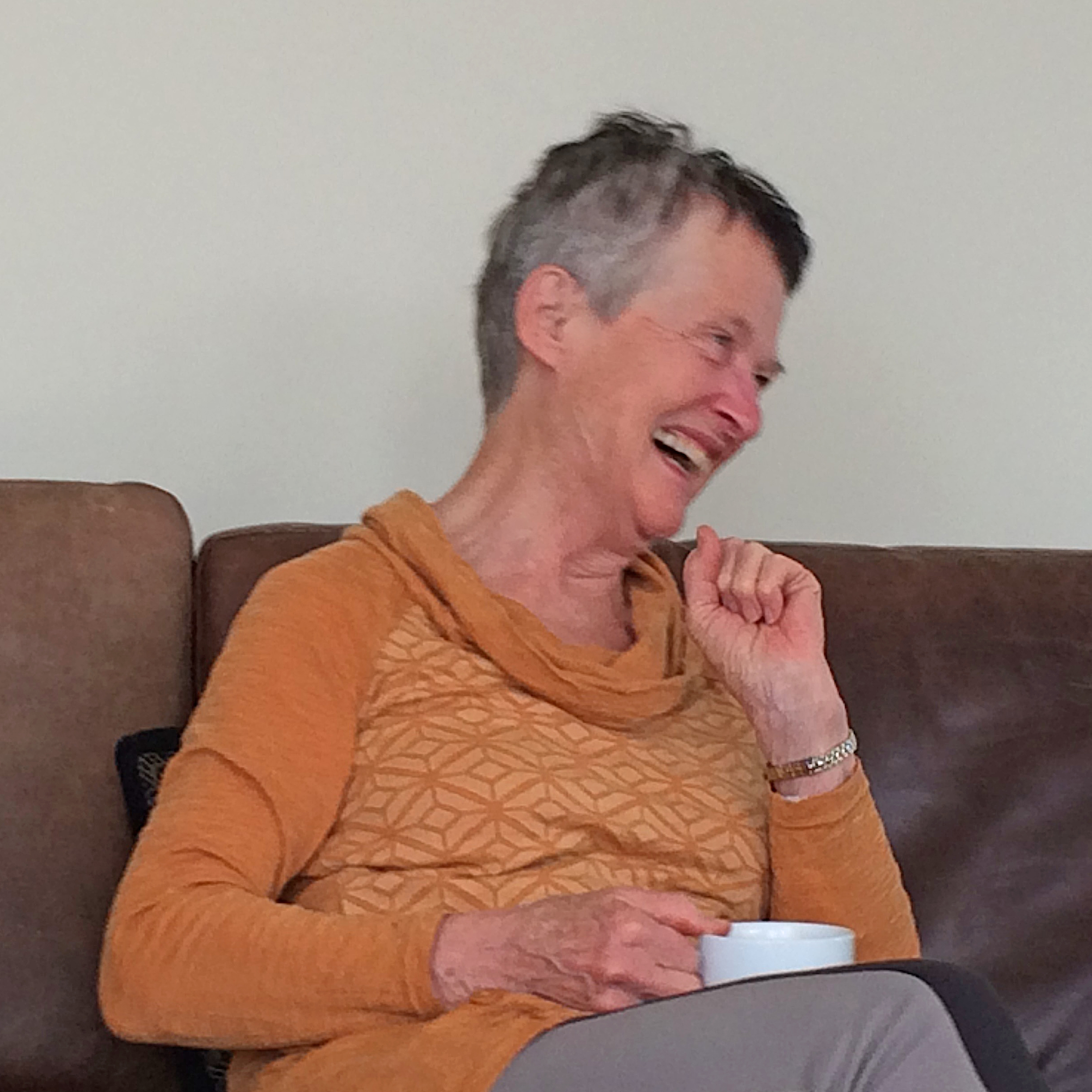
- Rachel McAlpine 2014
- Born: Rachel Phyllis Taylor; 24 February 1940 (age 86); Fairlie, New Zealand
- Education: University of Canterbury, Victoria University of Wellington
- Occupations: Poet; playwright; novelist
- Spouses: Grant McAlpine (m. 1959; div. 1981) Michael Smither (m. 1988; div. 1992)
- Children: 4
- Relatives: Ada Wells (great-grandmother)
- Website: writeintolife.com

Rachel Phyllis McAlpine (née Taylor; born 24 February 1940) is a New Zealand poet, novelist and playwright. She is the author of 30 books including poetry, plays, novels, and books about writing and writing for the internet.

== Early life, family and education ==
McAlpine was born in Fairlie on 24 February 1940. Her father was a vicar, and her mother was a granddaughter of notable New Zealand suffragette Ada Wells. She grew up with her five sisters in small-town vicarages in Canterbury, New Zealand. When she was 10 the family moved to Christchurch, where she attended Christchurch Girls' High School and the University of Canterbury, graduating with a BA degree in 1960.

In 1959, aged 19, she married engineer Grant McAlpine and they had two daughters and two sons. They spent four years in Geneva before returning to Masterton, New Zealand, where she raised her children and taught high school. In 1973 she gained a Diploma in Education from Massey University and in 1977 she completed a BA(Hons) at Victoria University of Wellington. After McAlpine and her first husband divorced in 1981, she married artist Michael Smither in 1988, but their marriage ended in 1992.

== Literary career ==
McAlpine began writing poetry in 1974, with her debut collection, Lament for Ariadne, published in 1975. It was published in the same year as debut collections by Lauris Edmond and Elizabeth Smither, and according to The Cambridge Guide to Literature in English, marked "an important development in women's writing in New Zealand". By 1993 she had published seven further collections. Her poetry has been praised for its "exuberant, strongly feminist lyrics". Her first play, The Stationary Sixth Form Poetry Trip, was first performed in 1980, and she wrote a number of further plays including some dialogue plays for radio. In 1982 she participated in a writer's exchange scheme between Australia and New Zealand, holding a fellowship at Macquarie University in Sydney.

Her first two novels, The Limits of Green (1985) and Running Away from Home (1987), were both set in the future, with environmentalist themes, and received polarising reviews from critics. Some reviews praised her creativity and energetic prose, but Mark Williams criticised her "magic realism without the realism". Her third novel Farewell Speech (1990) was a fictional account of the lives of suffragettes Kate Sheppard, Ada Wells and Wells' daughter. It received some criticism for its portrayal of the women, with Sheppard's biographer and great-great-niece Tessa K. Malcolm calling it "slander in fiction". It was adapted into an award-winning play by Cathy Downes in 1993. Her fourth novel, Humming (2005), was set in Golden Bay, and described by The Press as "a quirky read, with plenty of sly humour but with an underlying seriousness about matters spiritual and a person's discovery of a connection with the world around them".

McAlpine began teaching short courses on writing and managing web content in 1996, writing her first book on the topic, Web Word Wizardry, in 1999. An American edition was published in 2001. She has continued working in web writing education, launching a company in 2007 that offered online web-writing packages to individuals and businesses. She has also used websites as a companion to her writing, most notably by creating a website to accompany her novel Humming (2005).

McAlpine is a member of the Capital Choir, Wellington, and was the poetry editor for Shaky Places, a 14-song cycle of New Zealand experiences based on poems from well-known New Zealand poets including herself, Sam Hunt, Riemke Ensing and Bill Manhire. The music was composed by Felicia Edgecombe and it was first performed in November 2015.

In recent years, McAlpine has written blogs and performed podcasts about aging, and in 2020 she published a collection of her poems called How to Be Old in celebration of her 80th birthday.

== Honours and awards ==
- 1982 Australia-New Zealand Writer's Fellowship, Macquarie University
- 1986 Writer in Residence, University of Canterbury
- 1991 New Zealand Scholarship in Letters
- 1993–1995 Visiting Scholar, Doshisha Women's College of Liberal Arts, Kyoto
- 2010 Writer in Residence, Château de Lavigny, Switzerland

== Selected works ==
=== Non-fiction ===
- 1980 Song in the Satchel: Poetry in the High School (Wellington: NZCER)
- 1992 Real Writing (Wellington: GP Publications)
- 1994 Masako in New Zealand (Tokyo: Tairyusha)
- 1994 The Secret Life of New Zealand (Tokyo: Tairyusha)
- 1995 Katherine Mansfield in New Zealand (Tokyo: Asahi Press)
- 1995 Ready for English (Wellington: Learning Media)
- 1996 The Great New Zealand Study Trip (Auckland: New House)
- 1997 Global English for Global Business (Auckland: Addison Wesley Longman; reprinted CC Press 2005)
- 1998 The Passionate Pen: Romance Writers of New Zealand speak to Rachel McAlpine (Christchurch: Hazard)
- 1999 Web Word Wizardry (Wellington: CC Press; 2002. 2nd edition. Berkeley, CA: Ten Speed)
- 1999 Crash Course in Corporate Communications (Wellington: CC Press, Revised 2006)
- 2000 Nine Winning Habits of Successful Authors (Wellington: CC Press.)
- 2007 Better Business Writing on the Web (Wellington: CC Press)
- 2009 Write me a web page, Elsie! (Wellington: CC Press)
- 2013 Business Writing Plus (Wellington: CC Press)

=== Fiction ===
- 1985 The Limits of Green (Auckland: Penguin)
- 1987 Running Away from Home (Auckland: Penguin)
- 1990 Farewell Speech (Auckland: Penguin Books). 1996 Translated into Japanese by Masako Meio (Tokyo: Shinsui-Sha)
- 2005 Humming (Christchurch: Hazard)
- 2010 Scarlet Heels: 26 Stories about Sex (Wellington: CC Press) (short stories)
- 2016 Fixing Mrs Philpott

=== Poetry collections ===
- 1975 Lament for Ariadne (Dunedin: Caveman)
- 1977 Stay at the Dinner Party (Dunedin: Caveman)
- 1978 Fancy Dress (Auckland: Cicada)
- 1980 House Poems (Wellington: Nutshell Books)
- 1983 Recording Angel (Wellington: Mallinson Rendell)
- 1986 Thirteen Waves (Palmerston North: Homeprint)
- 1988 Selected Poems (Wellington: Mallinson Rendel)
- 1993 Tourist in Kyoto (Wellington: Nutshell Books)
- 2001 Another 100 New Zealand Poems for Children (Ed.)(Auckland: Random House)
- 2005 A for Blog (Wellington: CC Press)
- 2020 How to Be Old (Wellington: Cuba Press)

=== Children's books ===
- 1990 Maria and Mrs Kominski (Auckland: Black Cat Books) (short stories)
- 1993 Maria in the Middle (London: HarperCollins) (also broadcast by NZ On Air)
- 1994 Maria and the Lady Next Door (Wellington: Learning Media Limited, also translated into five Pacific languages)

=== Stage plays ===
- 1980 The Stationary Sixth Form Poetry Trip (Wellington: Playmarket; many productions)
- 1985 Driftwood (Wellington: Victoria University Press; many productions)
- 1988 Peace Offering (Auckland: Heinemanns; various productions)
- 1990 Power Play (Wellington: Playmarket; various productions)
- 2000 The Dazzling Night: a Noh play in English (Produced Le Mata Theatre, Auckland; published Kyoto Journal & New Zealand Journal of Asian Studies)

=== Plays performed but not published ===
- 1981 The Life Fantastic (Radio New Zealand)
- 1982 Cats Don't Marry (Radio New Zealand)
- 1984 Quite Nice Really (Radio New Zealand)
- 1986 Paper Towers (Christchurch: Court Theatre (New Zealand))
- 1988 The Op Shop Quartet (Radio New Zealand)
- 1989 (adapted from Katherine Mansfield) The Stranger, Mr Reginald Peacock's Day (Radio New Zealand)
