= Bridie Lonie =

New Zealand artist and academic

- Born: 1951 or 1952 (age 74–75); Dunedin, New Zealand
- Occupations: Academic; arts educator; arts writer
- Title: Emeritus member, Dunedin School of Art
- Parents: Iain Lonie; Jean Lonie

Academic background
- Education: University of Otago (PhD)
- Thesis: Closer Relations, Art, Climate Change, Interdisciplinarity and the Anthropocene (2018)
- Doctoral advisor: Lisa Ellis; Erika Wolf

Bridie Lonie (born 1951 or 1952) is a New Zealand academic, arts educator, arts writer and artist. She lectured in art history and art theory at the Dunedin School of Art (now part of Te Pūkenga), served as head of the school over several periods between 2001 and 2021, and is now an emeritus member of the school. Her art has a particular focus on climate change and environmental issues.

== Life and career ==
Lonie was born in Dunedin, and is the eldest of the four children of poets Iain Lonie and Jean Lonie. Lonie trained at the Dunedin Teachers' Training College. She is a graduate of Elam School of Art, where she studied painting and etching and earned a bachelor's degree in fine arts. After leaving partway through her master's degree, Lonie moved to Wellington.

Lonie became involved in the feminist art scene in Wellington; she was part of the artist Joanna Paul's project "A Season's Diaries" in the late 1970s and a founding member of the Women's Gallery in 1980. She also worked as a book representative for Oxford University Press and a librarian at the Parliamentary library and the Turnbull Library. At the Women's Gallery she co-edited the 1988 book A Women's Picture Book: 25 Women Artists of Aotearoa (New Zealand) with Tilly Lloyd and Marian Evans. From 1997 she worked with Evans and the Spiral collective on a video project called Getting Free, about resilience following violation.

In the 1980s Lonie moved back to Dunedin, where she went to teachers' college and taught at Otago Girls High School. In 1993 she became the first visiting scholar at the Dunedin School of Art and subsequently joined it as a lecturer of art history and theory. In 1998 she completed her master's degree with a thesis titled Image and Word in the Production of Meaning in Art Therapy. In 2001 Lonie and her sister Sally (then an art teacher at Waimea College) drew a lead pencil artwork titled "Big Sister Little Sister" which was created and exhibited at the Suter Art Gallery in Nelson.

Lonie served as acting head of the school in 2001 and again in 2003–2005; in 2005 she was appointed to the role permanently. She also ran the fine arts programme. Under her leadership the school introduced a three-year degree programme, expanded its space and held a conference for art educators. She stepped down from the head of the school role in 2009 but continued lecturing and running the visual arts programme.

In 2004 Lonie and artist Marilynn Webb co-authored Marilynn Webb: Prints and pastels, a record of Webb's life and art. From 2013 to 2014 Lonie was the president of the Dunedin Public Art Gallery Society, and in 2015 she worked on the development group for Ara Toi Ōtepoti Our Creative Future, Dunedin's Arts and Culture Strategy. She is also an arts writer and has had work published in Arts New Zealand and The New Zealand Listener. She received her doctorate from the University of Otago in 2018, with her thesis exploring the relationship of artists and climate change.

In 2019 Lonie returned to the role of head of the Dunedin School of Arts. In 2020 under her leadership the school held a symposium titled Mapping the Anthropocene in Otepoti/Dunedin — Climate change, community and research in the creative arts. She retired at the end of 2021 and was appointed an emeritus member.
