= Bishop Viard College =

Secondary school in New Zealand

Location
- 20 Kenepuru Drive, Porirua, New Zealand; 41.1404°S 174.8393°E

Information
- Type: State integrated, Co-educational, Secondary Years 7–13
- Motto: Truth is Light
- Established: 1968; 58 years ago
- Ministry of Education Institution no.: 256
- Principal: Chris Theobald
- Enrolment: 398 (July 2026)
- Socio-economic decile: 1C
- Website: viard.school.nz

Bishop Viard College, also known as Viard College or BVC, is a coeducational, integrated, secondary school (years 7–13) located in Kenepuru, Porirua, New Zealand.

== History ==
The college was founded in 1968 by Cardinal Peter McKeefry, Archbishop of Wellington, and was staffed by the Assumptionist Fathers and the Brigidine Sisters. The school was named after Philippe Viard, the first Catholic Bishop of Wellington. Originally the school consisted of two institutions (for boys and girls) on the same site, however it became a single co-educational unit in 1975.

The school celebrated its 50th Jubilee on Labour weekend, 19–21 October 2018.

== Notable alumni ==
- Brent Anderson – rugby union player
- Bernard Cadogan – poet, philosopher, and historian
- Joe Filemu – rugby union player
- Izzy Ford – local-body politician and rugby union player
- Faifili Levave – rugby union player
- Tom Maiava (born 1999) - rugby sevens player for Samoa.
- Vince Mellars – rugby league and rugby union player
- Anthony Perenise – rugby union player
- John Schwalger – rugby union player

== Sources ==
- Lillian G. Keys, Philip Viard, Bishop of Wellington, Pegasus Press, Christchurch, 1968.
- Ernest Richard Simmons, Brief history of the Catholic Church in New Zealand, Catholic Publications Centre, Auckland, 1978.
- Michael King, God's farthest outpost : a history of Catholics in New Zealand, Viking, Auckland 1997.
- Michael O'Meeghan S.M., Steadfast in hope : the story of the Catholic Archdiocese of Wellington 1850–2000, Dunmore press, Palmerston North, 2003.
- Broadbent, John V. "Viard, Philippe Joseph 1809–1872 Priest, missionary, bishop". Dictionary of New Zealand Biography. Ministry for Culture and Heritage.
- Te Kete Ipurangi
