= Judith Lonie =

New Zealand poet

- Born: Judith Muriel Benson; 1935 Australia
- Died: 18 December 1982 (aged 46) Newcastle, UK
- Occupation: Poet; speech therapist
- Years active: 1971–1982
- Spouse: Iain Lonie (m. 1969)
- Children: 2

Judith Muriel Lonie (née Benson; 1935–1982) was an Australian poet. She published one volume of poetry during her lifetime, with a second published posthumously; her poetry was often about personal or intimate subjects but treated in an impersonal way. Her poems have been included in several anthologies. Her husband, the New Zealand poet Iain Lonie, wrote three volumes of poetry about the intense grief he felt after her death.

== Life and career ==
Lonie was born in Australia in 1935. She and her first husband had a daughter, born in 1957.

In 1961, she met Iain Lonie, New Zealand poet and academic, at the University of Sydney. She was a postgraduate student in his department. In 1965, Lonie moved to Dunedin, and she followed him in 1966. They were married in 1969. She worked as editor of a sailing magazine, and in 1970 she self-published a chapbook named Seascapes. It was described by newspaper The Press as "an unusual work", being "a piece of concrete poetry which transposed the title and its connotations both pictorially and anagrammatically".

Lonie's first volume of poetry, Earth into Moon, was published in 1971. It was published by the Bibliography Room at the University of Otago, and printed by the firm of John McIndoe. A review in The Press described the poems in this collection as "distinguished by an almost austere sense of self-discipline" and characterised by an "economical, suggestive manner". Her poetry was included in the first anthology of women's verse in New Zealand, Private Gardens: An Anthology of New Zealand Women Poets, published in 1977 and edited by Riemke Ensing. Her son was born in 1973.

Lonie and her husband moved to England in 1978 in order that she could gain a professional qualification in speech therapy from the University of Newcastle. Lonie graduated in 1982 and gained a position at Newcastle General Hospital as a speech therapist. During her studies, she co-authored an article with Ruth Lesser regarding the use of intonation by brain-damaged patients.

== Death ==
Lonie died suddenly in December 1982, not long after her graduation and before she could start working as a speech therapist. Her second volume of poetry, The Remembering of the Elements, was published posthumously in 1984. A review in Canadian Literature noted the personal nature of the collection and that it "struggles with images of framing (being "put in the picture") and of disintegration". Heather McPherson, writing in The Press, said the collection gave the overall impression "of a complex mind which rewards the connoisseur".

Lonie's husband's final three volumes of poetry, published in 1984, 1986 and 1991, record the intense grief he felt about her death and his difficulties in coming to terms with it.

The Oxford Companion to New Zealand Literature describes Lonie's poetry as having "an often impersonal tone, contrasting with its personal subject matter": "She looks at strangers, at intimates and at self with a slightly curious, and sometimes judgmental detachment." Her poems have been published in several anthologies since her death, including Yellow Pencils: Contemporary Poetry by New Zealand Women (1988) compiled by Lydia Wevers, and Shards of Silver (2006), an anthology of poetry and photography compiled by Paul Thompson.
