= Jean Lonie =

New Zealand poet and teacher

- Born: Jean Stella Andrews; 4 August 1930 Whanganui, New Zealand
- Died: 1997 (aged 66–67) Dunedin, New Zealand
- Occupation: Poet; teacher
- Years active: 1987–1997
- Spouse: Iain Lonie (m. 1951; div. 1966)
- Children: 4, including Bridie Lonie

Jean Stella Lonie (née Andrews; 4 August 1930 – 1997) was a New Zealand poet and teacher. She published three volumes of poetry during her lifetime, with her poems often featuring her home and family life.

== Life and family ==
Lonie was born in Whanganui in 1930, and studied science at the University of Otago, where she met and married poet Iain Lonie. Lonie and her husband had four children, and separated in 1966. Following the split, Lonie moved to Wellington and worked at the Alexander Turnbull Library and the New Zealand Correspondence School (now known as Te Aho o Te Kura Pounamu). Lonie died in 1997.

Her oldest daughter, Bridie Lonie, is an artist and academic, and was the Head of School at the Dunedin School of Art. Her younger daughter Sally is also an artist, and illustrated Lonie's second volume of poetry Angle of Repose. Her son, Jono, is a guitarist and violinist.

== Poetry ==
Lonie published three volumes of poetry: Towards the League of Strong Women (1987), Angle of Repose (1991), and Working within Restraints (1996). The Oxford Companion to New Zealand Literature (2006) describes Lonie's poetry as "very personal and intimate; it attends with care (and with increasing control and sureness) to the task of recording the troublesome business of daily living, in which individual relationships often occasion difficulties, but equally often provide great richness."

Her second volume Angle of Repose (1991) was dedicated to her children and grandchildren. New Zealand writer Peter Simpson, reviewing the volume for the New Zealand Review of Books, described her poetry as "unpretentious and often vivid documentation of perceptions of house, garden and sea-shore, occasionally enlivened by quiet humour".

Her third volume Working within Restraints (1996) was reviewed by poet Harvey McQueen for the Dominion Post. He said a "quiet regret runs through [her poems], but also a sense that out of effort comes beauty and sometimes survival".

As part of a project by local Dunedin artists, Lonie's poem "Dunedin Summer" decorates the concrete seating and steps in front of the South Coast Boardriders clubrooms at the St Clair Esplanade.
