= J. H. Haslam =

New Zealand writer

Reverend J. H. (Jonathan Henry (Harry)) Haslam (13 July 1874 – 19 October 1969) was a New Zealand Methodist Church minister, poet, editor and Wesleyan Church historian. His edition of Rev. G. S. Harper's gold-digging diaries in Westland (republished in 2004) is a New Zealand heritage text.

== Life ==
J. H. Haslam was born in Christchurch on 13 July 1874. His father was Charles Haslam, an old Nelsonian. Early in his life, the family moved to Wellington where his father found work as a supervisor in the Hannah and Company's boot factory.

He was educated at Mt. Cook Boys’ School and later Newtown School before beginning his training into the Wesleyan Church ministry.

He moved to Auckland to continue his training for the ministry and attended Auckland University College graduating with a Bachelor of Arts degree in 1900.

Haslam served out his probationary years in Wellington until stationed to Christchurch. He married Florence Elizabeth Hurlstone in 1904, had two children: Eric Haslam and Gladys Hayman (née Haslam), and worked as a Methodist church minister stationed in many areas of New Zealand (including Christchurch, Temuka, Whanganui, Canterbury, Bunnythorpe (1913–17), Palmerston North, Invercargill, Waimate (1926-1929), Nelson, Auckland, Hamilton, Otago and Wellington) rising to distinction in the Methodist Church as Secretary and later President of Conference. Haslam was also a Methodist marriage celebrant.

As a young man, Haslam played cricket for the Wesley Cricket Club in Wellington. He enjoyed other sports such as tennis and continued to play at cricket matches organised by delegates to Methodist conferences. One of these matches between a Wednesday Association and a Clergyman's Eleven was played at the Basin Reserve.

He was also a member of the Savage Club and the Masonic Lodge and played music. His obituary notes: ‘He was for many years a member of the St Paul’s Choir and entertained at concerts with violin solos.’ He could play the piano in his later years for hymn singing.

Haslam retired to Waimate in 1940 where he lived out the remaining years of his long life. His wife Florence died in 1958. Towards the end of his life, he lost his eyesight and ‘it was his deep regret that he became divorced from his books’.

Haslam died at Waimate on 19 October 1969. He was 95 years old.

== Literary output ==
Haslam wrote verse from a young age. He became a member of the Wesleyan Literary and Debating Society in the early-mid 1890s, did acting for them, and edited their journal, which also printed some of his early poems.

In 1903, his poem ‘A Bike Race’ appeared in the Canterbury College Review while he was living there.

One book of his poetry, Scenes in Southland, appeared in London published by The Epworth Press in 1926. (This volume collects much of his poetry dating back to the 1890s.)

He is chiefly a sonneteer working over spiritual themes and the universal subjects of love and death. Other topics include war and literature, and his book contains a section of lighter verse possibly written in his younger years. Some poems certainly date back to his student years in Auckland. Several sonnets relate to the death of a close friend before 1926.

His other publications include contributing Westland Methodist Church history material by the Rev. G. S. Harper (1840-1911) to the Wesley Church History Society as well as editing Harper's Gold Diggings and the Gospel: The Westland Diary of the Rev. G. S. Harper, 1865-66.

The British Library has made available his sole collection, Scenes in Southland, as a download on Apple iTunes.

In 2012, New Zealand poet, critic and editor, Mark Pirie wrote on Haslam's cricket sonnet ‘Ambition’ (which discusses Sir Jack Hobbs) for the Tingling Catch weblog.

== Publications by Rev. J. H. Haslam ==
- Imperial Unity: A Super Parliament and an all British University by J. H. Haslam (London: Edward Lloyd, 1912, 1 folded sheet)
- Scenes in Southland (London: The Epworth Press, 1926)
- Extract from the M.S.S. Diary of Mr. E. Meurant, Native Interpreter, 1843-1845 edited by J. H. Haslam (Burnley, England: Wesley Historical Society, 1935, 1 folded sheet)
- The Beginnings of Methodism in Westland contributed by J. H. Haslam (Burnley, England: Wesley Historical Society, 1935–1936, 3 folded sheets)
- Gold Diggings and the Gospel: The Westland Diary of the Rev. G. S. Harper, 1865-66 edited by the Rev. Jonathan H. Haslam (Auckland: Wesley Historical Society of New Zealand, 1964)
- Gold Diggings and the Gospel: The Westland Diary of the Rev. G. S. Harper, 1865-66 edited by the Rev. Jonathan H. Haslam (Christchurch: Kiwi Publishers c.2004, facsimile reprint edition)
