= Kathleen Grattan Award =

New Zealand poetry award

The Kathleen Grattan Award is one of New Zealand's top poetry awards. It is named after Kathleen Grattan, an Auckland poet, who died in 1990. The award was first made in 2008.

== History ==
The Kathleen Grattan Award is a prestigious poetry prize for an original collection of poems or a long poem by a New Zealand or Pacific resident or citizen.

It is named after Kathleen Grattan, an Auckland poet, journalist and former editor of the New Zealand Woman's Weekly. Her work was published in Landfall and elsewhere, including Premier Poets, a collection from the World Poetry Society. She was a member of the Titirangi Poets. Kathleen Grattan died in 1990 and her daughter Jocelyn Grattan, who died in 2005, left Landfall a bequest with which to establish an award in her mother's name. She also left another bequest to fund the Kathleen Grattan Prize for a Sequence of Poems.

The inaugural award was made in 2008 and for some years it was given annually, but is now biennial.

== Eligibility and conditions ==
- This award is given biennially for a collection of poems, or one long poem
- Minimum submission length is 20 pages
- Entrants must be New Zealand or South Pacific permanent residents or citizens.
- Individual poems can have been previously published, but the collection as a whole should be unpublished.
- Entries (in an award year) are accepted until 31 July and the result is announced in the November issue of Landfall
- The winner receives a monetary prize of $10,000 and a year's subscription to Landfall.

== List of winners by year ==
Unless otherwise stated, all winners were published in the year following their award by Otago University Press

- 2008: Joanna Preston (The Summer King, which also won the Mary Gilmore Prize for best first book of poetry)
- 2009: Leigh Davis (posthumously) (Stunning debut of the Repairing of a Life)
- 2010: Jennifer Compton (This City)
- 2011: Emma Neale (The Truth Garden)
- 2013: Siobhan Harvey (Nephrology for Beginners, published as Cloudboy)
- 2015: Michael Harlow (Nothing for it but to Sing)
- 2017: Alison Glenny (The Farewell Tourist)
- 2019: Philip Armstrong (Sinking Lessons)
- 2021: Michael Steven (Night School)
- 2023: Jo McNeice (Blue Hour)
- 2025: Lynn Jenner (The Gum Trees of Kerikeri)

== See also ==
- Kathleen Grattan Prize for a Sequence of Poems
- List of New Zealand literary awards
