= Rosetta Allan =

New Zealand writer

- Born: Putāruru, New Zealand
- Education: University of Auckland (MCW, 2017)
- Occupations: Poet; novelist
- Spouse: James Allen (m. 1985)
- Writing career
- Years active: 2007–present
- Notable awards: Kathleen Grattan Prize for a Sequence of Poems (2010)

Rosetta Allan is a New Zealand poet and novelist. She has published two poetry collections and three novels, including the historical novel The Unreliable People (2019) and the autobiographical novel Crazy Love (2021). She received the Kathleen Grattan Prize for a Sequence of Poems in 2010, and has held writing residencies in New Zealand and Russia.

== Early life and education ==
Allan was born in Putāruru. She had a difficult childhood and was expelled from high school at the end of fifth form. She married her husband, James Allan, in 1985 after meeting him at a boarding house in Napier.

Allan holds a bachelor of arts and a master's degree in creative writing with first class honours (completed in 2017) from the University of Auckland. She received the Sir James Wallace Masters of Creative Writing Scholarship for her master's portfolio.

== Writing career ==
=== Poetry collections and first novel ===
Allan's first collection of poems, Little Rock, was published in 2007. Her second, Over Lunch, was published in 2010. She received the Kathleen Grattan Prize for a Sequence of Poems in 2010, and the Metonymy Best Poem Award in 2010. She held a South Pacific Writer's Lab Internship in 2011.

In 2012, Allan began researching the history of European settlement in New Zealand in order to further understand her own family tree. In doing so, she came across material regarding a man named John Finnigan, who was apparently murdered in 1865 along with his mother and two brothers. The incident was referred to as the Ōtāhuhu Murders, and formed the focal point for her first novel, Purgatory, which was published in New Zealand in 2014. Reviewer John McCrystal for The New Zealand Herald called it a "superb debut" with "supreme attention to historical detail"; he concluded that the book achieves an "evocation of the hardness and loneliness of the lives and deaths of our ancestors".

=== Residencies and second novel ===
In April 2016, Allan was appointed Writer-in-Residence at St Petersburg University in Russia; she was the first New Zealander to hold this residency. In 2018, she was appointed as a summer writer-in-residence at the Michael King Writers Centre. In 2019, she was appointed Creative New Zealand University of Waikato Writer in Residence in Hamilton for the year.

In 2019, Allan's second novel, The Unreliable People, was published by Penguin Random House. It is set in Russia and Kazakhstan during the deportation of Koreans in the Soviet Union, and Allan worked on it during her residency in Russia. Dionne Christian in The New Zealand Herald described the book as "a multi-layered and sophisticated [coming-of-age tale] where the contemporary intersects with the historical".

=== Third novel and later career ===
Allan's third novel, Crazy Love, was published in 2021 by Penguin Random House. It is based on her own diary entries and her own life, including her relationship with her husband. Sue Orr, in a review for Newsroom, questioned why it had been labelled as a novel: "I’ve tried to work out what has been gained by labelling as fiction this powerful account of a real, enduring love". Regardless, she concluded that the book is "triumphant; powerfully affecting, searingly honest, heartbreaking and hopeful". David Hill, in a review for Stuff, said it has a "engrossing, increasingly affecting narrative", and that Allan's writing "crackles with energy". Stephanie Johnson for The New Zealand Herald called it a "vividly written and compelling novel". Steve Braunias for Newsroom named it one of the ten best novels of 2021.

In 2021, Allan and her husband established the Crystal Arts Trust to fund scholarships for the University of Auckland and sponsor the first book award at the Ockham New Zealand Book Awards. In 2023 she held an Easter residency at the Michael King Writers Centre. In 2025 she received a $5,000 CLNZ | NZSA research grant to support work on her fourth novel.

== Publications ==
Allan's publications are:

- Little Rock (poetry collection, 2007)
- Over Lunch (poetry collection, 2010)
- Purgatory (novel, 2014)
- The Unreliable People (novel, 2019)
- Crazy Love (novel, 2021)
