= David Howard (poet) =

New Zealand poet, writer and editor

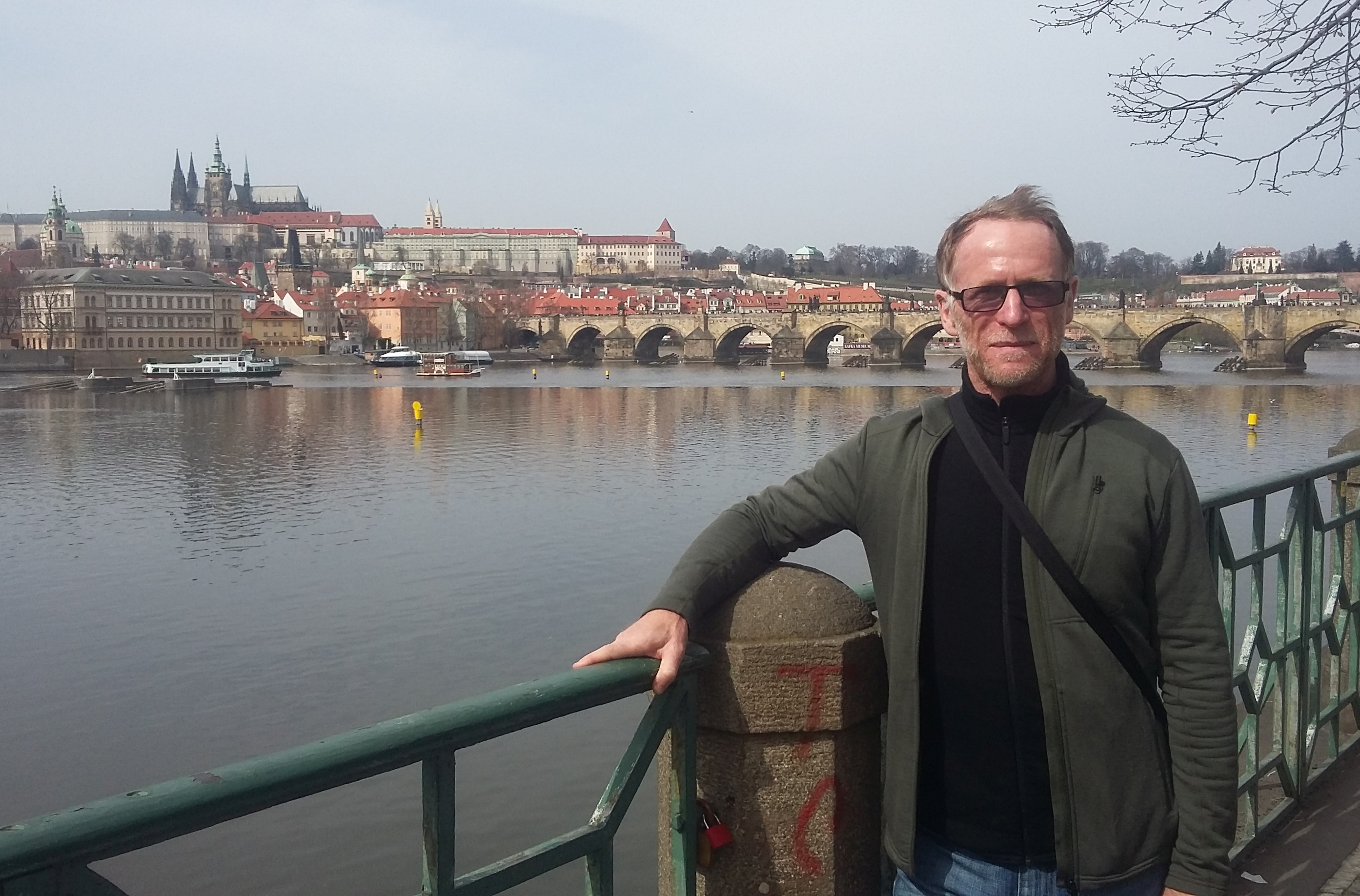
- Howard in 2016
- Born: 1959 (age 66–67); Christchurch
- Occupations: Poet, writer and editor
- Writing career
- Language: English
- Notable works: The Incomplete Poems; Shebang: Collected Poems 1980-2000; A Place To Go On From: The Collected Poems of Iain Lonie
- Notable awards: "Gordon & Gotch National Poetry Award, 1984" "New Zealand Society of Authors Mid-Career Writers Award, 2009" "University of South Pacific Poetry Prize, 2011"

David Howard (born 1959) is a New Zealand poet, writer and editor. His works have been widely published and translated into a variety of European languages. Howard was the co-founder of the literary magazine takahē in 1989 and the Canterbury Poets Collective in 1990. In New Zealand he held the Robert Burns Fellowship at the University of Otago in Dunedin in 2013, the Otago Wallace Residency, in Auckland in 2014, and the Ursula Bethell Residency in Christchurch, in 2016. In more recent years he has been the recipient of a number of UNESCO City of Literature Residencies.

== Life ==
David Howard was born in Christchurch, New Zealand, in 1959. He worked for many years as a pyrotechnic and special effects supervisor. His clientele included the All Blacks, Janet Jackson and Metallica.

In 1989, Howard co-founded the literary magazine takahē, named after the threatened New Zealand bird. takahē appears three times a year, publishing the short stories, poetry and art. He left the editorial board in 1993. In 1990, he co-founded the Canterbury Poets Collective. The collective organises poetry readings, open-mic evenings, and publications for young poets, all within the Christchurch area.

In 1999 Howard retired from his role as a SFX technician to live and write in Pūrākaunui, a small settlement north of Dunedin. At Pūrākaunui he lived in a purpose-built shed; his house "overlooks farmland and the blue screen of the South Pacific, onto which I can project my fantasies." Howard has also said that "at Pūrākaunui I enjoy the indifference of the world to my designs upon it."

Though Howard has lived primarily in New Zealand, his work has taken him to many different countries. In February 2009, he attended the International Poetry Festival in Granada, Nicaragua as the recipient of a grant from the International Writers' Program. More recently, Howard made an extended visit to the Czech Republic, as part of his Prague UNESCO City of Literature Residency in 2016 on the Creative Cities Network. In 2017, Howard was located in Pazin, Croatia as part of his stint at the Writers House Residency. Howard was based in Ulyanovsk, Russia in September 2019 for another UNESCO City of Literature Residency.

== Work and reception ==
Howard published his first book of poetry, Head First, in September 1985. A slim volume of eight poems over 32 pages, Head First included works that had previously appeared in Landfall and the New Zealand Listener. Its second poem, "A Darker Purpose", which imagines a scene from the life of New Zealand missionary Thomas Kendall, received first prize in the 1984 Gordon & Gotch New Zealand Poetry Awards.

His second collection, In The First Place: Poems 1980-1990, appeared in 1991. Several poems from Head First, including "A Darker Purpose", reappeared in altered form. A segment on the Austrian artist Egon Schiele, published in Head First as part of the poem "Consecutive Sentences," joined a group of new poems on artists, "The Portrait Gallery." Black and white photographs by Paul Swadel are interspersed among the poems. James Norcliffe wrote in The Star, "[Howard's] voice is his own and unmistakable, and his love poems with their often surrealistic edge have a quality rare in New Zealand poetry." David Eggleton, writing in the Otago Daily Times, described his poetry as "energetic, winningly acrobatic in the way it leaps from reference to reference, engagingly robust in the way it juggles ideas."

Eggleton weighed in again on Howard's third book, Holding Company (1995), with a review for Landfall, New Zealand's foremost and longest running literary journal. "Like John Ashbery," wrote Eggleton, Howard "celebrates the technique of indeterminacy – open-endedness; unlike Ashbery, he doesn't do riddles or frustrate the exchange of poetic commonplaces to subvert meaning. His poems promote affirmative action – we can have a dialogue, we can connect – and they wear their eroticism on their collective sleeve." Eggleton concluded by predicting that "as [Howard's] body of work continues to grow, we may confidently expect his vision to deepen and grow ever more original."

Howard's next volume, Shebang: Collected Poems 1980-2000 (2000), brought together most of the poems from In the First Place and Holding Company, along with a selection of new and previously uncollected work. A series of images by New Zealand artist Jason Greig accompany the poems. Harriet Zinnes reviewed the collection for the Denver Quarterly: "Let him write. Let him take on – the whole shebang. And he tries, this important New Zealand poet who, in short stanzas and incisively written lines, actually looks at his world of choice, and writes." Howard himself had described his poems as "gnarled, metaphysical poetry which fosters rather than forbids tenderness." Zinnes disagreed, arguing that his love poems have "a kind of contemporary lyricism, that is, a lyricism that avoids excess but yet exudes tenderness and desire even as it questions their endurance, even their power."

In 2003 Howard collaborated with the New Zealand photographer Fiona Pardington to create How To Occupy Ourselves, consisting of eighteen poems and seventeen photographs. "What is extraordinary about this writing," wrote Terry Locke, "is the number of tensions it sustains without quite resolving, between the foreign (defamiliarised) and familiar, the present and the remembered, the soft and the hard, the fleeting and the permanent." He declared it "a difficult book to review," because "it simply doesn't allow one to feel that one has settled into a confirmed reading."

Howard's next collection of new poems, The Word Went Round, appeared in 2006. The title poem is a dramatic monologue in two parts, written from the perspective of an Irish Catholic tenant farmer who emigrates to Otago in 1874. The volume included images of six paintings by New Zealand artist Gary Currin, created in response to the title poem.

In 2011, Howard published a second volume of collected works, The Incomplete Poems. New Zealand poet Michael Harlow praised Howard for writing "poems that are very much animated by a thoughtful music: those moments of quick surprise that so often are stunning in their overall effect." David Eggleton called the volume "a revisionist take on Howard's earlier big book, Shebang: Collected Poems 1980–2000.... Dates of composition for each poem have now been added, revealing that some of the poems in Shebang were written before 1980." "At times," Eggleton continues, Howard is "a kind of fossicking archaeologist, one who excavates telling language from Victorian journals and Scottish folk ballads, as well as superannuated rock songs. At other times, he's the laconic narrator forced to fall back on an embarrassment of unreliable words."

Howard's edition A Place To Go On From: The Collected Poems of Iain Lonie appeared in 2015. Howard compiled and edited the works of the late Cambridge scholar and Dunedin poet, Iain Lonie (1932–1988). The 2013–2015 New Zealand Poet Laureate, Vincent O'Sullivan, declared the volume a "superb edition of Iain Lonie's poems." Auckland author Peter Simpson named the volume as one of the best books of 2015: "In a brilliant act of literary resuscitation, Howard has brought together more than 200 poems, published and unpublished by Lonie, revealing him as important and unjustly neglected." A Place To Go On From demonstrated Howard's important role in ensuring that Lonie's works were not left to fade from memory.

Howard remains an active poet, with his most recent collection, The Ones Who Keep Quiet, published in 2017.

== Bibliography ==
=== Author ===
- Head First (Hard Echo Press, 1985) ISBN 0908715455
- In The First Place: Poems 1980-1990 (Hazard Press, 1991) ISBN 0908790147
- Holding Company (Nags Head Press, 1995) ISBN 0908784716
- Shebang: Collected Poems 1980-2000 (Steele Roberts, 2000) ISBN 1877228591
- How to Occupy Ourselves (HeadworX, 2003) ISBN 0473094363
- The Word Went Round (Otago University Press, 2006) ISBN 1877372315
- The Incomplete Poems (Cold Hub Press, 2011) ISBN 9780473189860
- You're So Pretty When You're Unfaithful To Me (Holloway Press, 2012) ISBN 9780986461859
- The Speak House (Cold Hub Press, 2014) ISBN 9780473283643
- The Ones Who Keep Quiet (Otago University Press, 2017) ISBN 9780947522445

=== Editor ===
- takahē editions 1-16 with Sandra Arnold, Mike Minehan and Bernadette Hall (Takahē Publishing Collective, 1989-1993)
- A Place To Go On From: The Collected Poems of Iain Lonie (Otago University Press, 2015) ISBN 9781927322017

== Awards and honours ==
- Gordon & Gotch National Poetry Award, 1984
- Finalist Davoren Hanna Poetry Competition, 2001
- New Zealand Society of Authors Mid-Career Writers Award, 2009
- University of South Pacific Poetry Prize, 2011
- Robert Burns Fellowship, Dunedin, New Zealand, 2013
- Otago Wallace Residency, Auckland, New Zealand, 2014
- UNESCO City of Literature Residency, Prague, Czech Republic, 2016
- Ursula Bethell Residency, Christchurch, New Zealand, 2016
- Writers House Residency, Pazin, Croatia, 2017
- UNESCO City of Literature Residency, Ulyanovsk, Russia, 2019
