= Iain Lonie =

New Zealand poet and historian

- Born: Iain Malcolm Lonie; 1932; March, Cambridgeshire
- Died: 18 June 1988 (aged 55–56); Dunedin, New Zealand
- Education: King's College, Cambridge
- Occupations: Poet; historian
- Notable work: A Place to Go On From (collected works, published posthumously)
- Spouses: Jean Andrews (m. 1951; div. 1966) Judith Benson (m. 1969; died 1982)
- Children: 5, including Bridie Lonie

Iain Malcolm Lonie (1932 – 18 June 1988) was a British-born New Zealand poet and a historian of ancient Greek medicine. His academic career was spent between New Zealand, Australia and England. He read classics at the University of Cambridge, lectured at universities in both Australia and New Zealand, worked as a research fellow for the Wellcome Trust, and wrote a definitive textbook on the Hippocratic texts On Generation, On the Nature of the Child and Diseases IV.

Lonie's first volumes of poetry were published in 1967 and 1970. After the sudden death of his second wife in 1982, loss and grief became his central poetic themes. His poems received little critical attention during his lifetime, but in 2015 (nearly three decades after his death) the publication of his collected works by New Zealand poet and editor David Howard sparked renewed interest in his work.

== Early life and education ==
Lonie was born in the town of March, Cambridgeshire, and moved to Gisborne in New Zealand with his family in 1942. He completed a Bachelor of Arts in classics at the University of Otago in 1954, and went on to read classics at King's College, Cambridge, specialising in ancient philosophy and the history of medicine. He graduated from Cambridge in 1956 with a first-class honours degree and a distinction in ancient philosophy.

Lonie married Jean Andrews in 1951, a science student he met at Carrington Hall. They had four children together between 1951 and 1962. Their oldest daughter, Bridie Lonie, is an artist and academic. She was the Head of School at the Dunedin School of Art until her retirement in 2022. Their younger daughter Sally is also an artist. Their son, Jono, is a guitarist and violinist.

== Academic and literary career ==
In 1956, Lonie was appointed as a lecturer in classics at the University of New England, New South Wales. It was at the University of New England that Lonie met famous New Zealand writer C. K. Stead, and the two worked together on a translation of Alcestis by Euripides, which was performed by the University Players in the Armidale Town Hall, and a version later broadcast for the ABC.

In 1959, he moved to the University of Sydney to become a lecturer in Latin. In 1965, he returned to New Zealand and took up a position as a senior lecturer in classics at the University of Otago. In 1966, in the new year, he left his wife Jean for Judith Black, a post-graduate student he had met in Sydney, who moved to Dunedin with her daughter. They were married in 1969. In 1970 Lonie was promoted to Assistant Professor, and in 1973 he and Judith had a son. Lonie's first two volumes of poetry were published during this time: Recreations (Wai-te-ata Press, 1967) and Letters from Ephesus (The Bibliography Room, University of Otago, 1970).

In 1974 Lonie resigned from his university post to become a deckhand on the Otago Harbour Board dredge, seemingly as a result of an attack of depression, from which Lonie suffered throughout his life. He gained a nautical qualification at night school. In 1978 Lonie and his wife moved to Newcastle upon Tyne with their son in order that she could study a degree in speech therapy, and Lonie took up a position as a research fellow at the Wellcome Institute.

In December 1982, his wife Judith died suddenly and he returned to New Zealand with his young son. His next volumes of poetry, Courting Death (Wai-te-ata, 1984) and The Entrance to Purgatory (McIndoe, 1986), record the grief he felt about her death and his difficulties in coming to terms with it. The Entrance to Purgatory was shortlisted at the 1987 New Zealand Book Awards. A review in The Press described his poetry on the subject of death as "genuine and moving" and displaying "considerable virtuosity", although noted that the title poem in particular seemed to owe a debt to Allen Curnow. He became an editor for a printing firm and briefly for the Otago University Press. He also edited a collection of Judith's poetry, The Remembering of the Elements, which was published in 1984.

== Death and legacy ==
In 1988, Lonie took his own life. His final volume of poetry, Winter Walk at Morning (Victoria University Press, 1991), was published posthumously.

He was described after his death as "one of the best and most innovative modern historians of classical medicine". He wrote extensively on the Hippocratic Corpus and ancient Greek medicine. His book, A Commentary on the Hippocratic Treatises 'On Generation', 'On the Nature of the Child' and 'Diseases IV' (1981) was the definitive text on these treatises for many years, and continues to be widely cited in academic literature. It was made available as an e-book in 2011. Lonie's translations of Hippocratic texts The Nature of the Child, The Seed and The Heart were printed in Hippocratic Writings by G.E.R. Lloyd, a Penguin Classic.

The Oxford Companion to New Zealand Literature (2006) records that Lonie was bothered by the "lack of recognition" of his work within the New Zealand literary world, as he hoped to be remembered for his work as a poet rather than as an academic. It highlights the classicism in his poetry through retold legends and mythological references; "Firmly located within particular places, and enriched by traditional cultural echoes, his poetry reveals a strong lyric voice and intense feeling, always tempered by controlled handling of verse forms and by very discriminating choice of language." 99 Ways Into New Zealand Poetry (2010), by Paula Green and Harry Ricketts, names Lonie as an example of a "maverick" New Zealand poet, "whose work demands but has not yet received the attention it deserves".

In 1996, Dunedin composer Anthony Ritchie set Lonie's poems "Collection Day" and "My Toaster Tells the Time" to music in his work Opus 76, Five Dunedin Songs.

== A Place to Go On From: The Collected Poems of Iain Lonie ==
In 2015, the Otago University Press published A Place to Go On From: The Collected Poems of Iain Lonie, edited by David Howard and with an introduction by scholar Damian Love. In the introduction, Love stated that "very few New Zealanders, perhaps none besides Baxter, have written so many good poems possessed of an urgent inner necessity".

Vincent O'Sullivan, then the New Zealand Poet Laureate, described the collection as "superb", and commented that he had not realised until its publication "how fine and important a writer Lonie was":

He brought to his poetry the precision and clarity and intellectual force of a gifted classical scholar. He was patiently indifferent to passing fashions, with his own more enduring touchstones. And in a remarkable fidelity to the tides of his productive but troubled life, he wrote a body of poems on love and grief and the searing currents of remembrance that, in New Zealand writing, stands alone.

A Place to Go On From was critically well-received and prompted renewed interest in Lonie's works. Professor Lawrence Jones, writing in Landfall Review Online, commented on the long delay between Lonie's death and the publication of these collected works, and said: "The reader can only be grateful that such poetry has been made available to us". Auckland author Peter Simpson named the volume as one of the best books of 2015: "In a brilliant act of literary resuscitation, Howard has brought together more than 200 poems, published and unpublished by Lonie, revealing him as important and unjustly neglected."

Lonie's poem "The Entrance to Purgatory" was included in the 2015 edition of Best New Zealand Poems, an anthology edited by John Newton. In the anthology's introduction, Newton commented that "as other readers have concluded before me, [Lonie] is among the best of his generation", and said A Place to Go On From "easily passes the informal test of historical work that still feels like news in 2015. In fact, of everything that's come through the mail-slot this year, this is the book I've spent the most time with."

== Selected works ==
=== Poetry ===
- Recreations (1967, 1970)
- Letters from Ephesus (1970)
- Courting Death (1984)
- The Entrance to Purgatory (1986)
- Winter Walk at Morning (1991)

=== Academic books ===
- A Commentary on the Hippocratic Treatises 'On Generation', 'On the Nature of the Child' and 'Diseases IV' (1981)
- The Medical Renaissance of the Sixteenth Century (with Andrew Wear and Roger Kenneth French, 1986)
