= Leigh Davis (poet) =

New Zealand poet (1955–2009)

Leigh Robert Davis
- Born: 20 June 1955; Raetihi, New Zealand
- Died: 3 October 2009 (aged 54)
- Website: www.jackbooks.com/Leigh/Leigh.htm

Leigh Robert Davis (20 June 1955 – 3 October 2009) was a New Zealand writer who created long poems and large-scale, mixed-media projects in which he worked with painters, designers and composers. He was known for the highly experimental nature of his creative work.

== Life ==
Davis was born in Raetihi. He completed an M.A. Honours degree in English at Auckland University (including a thesis on the poetry of Allen Curnow), then studied Commerce subjects towards an M.B.A. at Victoria University of Wellington. In 1980 he married Susan Unwin whom he had met as a fellow student and they had four children together.

Davis worked for several years as an analyst for the New Zealand Treasury, then in 1985 joined the merchant bank of Michael Fay and David Richwhite. He became a principal of their company in 1993, before forming his own venture, Jump Capital, a private equity fund, in 1999. He was active as a patron of the arts, becoming a Trustee of the Arts Foundation of New Zealand (2006–09) and sponsor of the Auckland art installation site Jar.

In 2008 Davis was diagnosed with a brain tumour. He devoted the final year of his life to the completion of two large projects, Nameless and Stunning Debut of the Repairing of a Life. The latter book records his successful struggle to regain the power of writing after the disruption caused by two brain operations and a course of radiotherapy and chemotherapy.

== Career ==
Davis's literary career began with the book-length poetic sequence Willy's Gazette which won the Best New Zealand First Book of Poetry Award in 1983. It contained 95 sonnets in unusual post-modern forms; for example, one sonnet was printed both in draft and final versions. Parts of the sequence were based on his experiences as a government official. It was described by Elizabeth Caffin in The Oxford History of New Zealand Literature in English as "a rich, clever, and sophisticated exploration (in mock sonnet form) of the arbitrary and purely conventional nature of cultural signs". As a result of this book's success Davis was featured extensively in the 1987 anthology New Poets edited by Murray Edmond and Mary Paul.

With his friends Alex Calder and Roger Horrocks, Davis co-edited the magazine And which ran for four issues between 1983 and 1985. This provided a platform for some of New Zealand's most experimental prose and poetry writers, and also broke new ground in literary criticism by applying post-structuralist theory to local literature and art. The magazine "made a considerable impact on contemporary New Zealand literary studies" according to Hugh Lauder, editor of Landfall. Mark Williams wrote in The Journal of New Zealand Literature: “And went further towards initiating that long awaited renovation of local literary habits than any previous New Zealand little magazine since Freed, and perhaps since Phoenix.”

Between 1985 and 1998 Davis directed most of his energies to his business career. Then in 1998 he returned to writing with Station of Earth-bound Ghosts. This was the first of a series of large mixed-media projects in which he worked with artists from other fields (such as designers Stephen Canning and Christine Hansen). Station consisted of a series of texts in the form of flags which were hung the length of Auckland's Central Railway Station concourse. The work incorporated many elements in juxtaposition (in the manner of Ezra Pound's Cantos), and was based primarily on the famous Maori historical figure Te Kooti.

This was followed in 1999 by Te Tangi a te Matuhi, a book in a box, which combined reproductions of the flags with work by Māori and Pākehā contributors, and a CD of related music. These flags began to be exhibited again in 2010 at Jar (589 New North Road, Kingsland, Auckland).

The Book of Hours (2001) was another book in a box (with visual elements by artist John Reynolds). This long poem by Davis was inspired by a yacht race and its patterns of movement.

General Motors (2001) was a sequence of poems that focused on a 16th-century painting by Garofalo (Benvenuto Tisi) of “Saint Nicholas of Tolentino Reviving the Birds". Marjorie Perloff has written enthusiastically about the work's "enigmatic layering of word and image". In collaboration with artist Stephen Bambury and others, General Motors was produced both as a limited-edition book and as an on-line, partly animated text on Davis's website jackbooks.com. The digital and physical versions each represented an experiment in re-thinking the genre of poetry and the medium of the book.

Anarchy (2006) was an "omnibus" work, presented as a text/image exhibition at the Starkwhite Gallery in Auckland. Davis later expanded the project (with the help of Bambury and others) under the title of Nameless to include music, performance and installations. This is scheduled for publication in book form in 2011, together with the companion volume, Redux, edited by Bambury, which will include a DVD realisation.

Davis's final poetry book, Stunning Debut of the Repairing of a Life, was published by Otago University Press in 2010 and won the Kathleen Grattan Poetry Award for that year.

Davis also contributed shorter poems to magazines such as Parallax, Splash, and Brief Description of the Whole World. His essays on art represent another large body of work which he planned to publish as a single collection under the title Art Knowledge.

In 2009 the obituary in New Zealand's National Business Review described Davis as "an avant-gardist in both his creative and business careers", "a complex and intriguing individual", and one of Auckland's "highest achievers".

He was a controversial figure in the literary world during his lifetime, due both to the avant-garde nature of his writing and to his involvement in the business world which (according to Iain Sharp) "infuriated most of the literati who still expected artists and poets to register in public their unceasing opposition to Mammon.” Davis's work tended to be received with greater interest among visual artists. In an obituary for the on-line literary magazine Ka Mate Ka Ora, Roger Horrocks wrote: "The scope and experimental energy of Leigh’s work make it unique in contemporary New Zealand poetry….The extent to which this highly original writer was ignored or marginalised during his lifetime is likely to amaze future readers".

== Awards ==
1983: Best New Zealand First Book of Poetry Award
2010: Kathleen Grattan Award for Poetry (posthumously)

== Bibliography ==
- 1983: Willy’s Gazette, Wellington, Jack Books
- 1999: Te Tangi a te Matuhi, Auckland, Jack Books
- 1999: Willy’s Gazette, Second Edition, Auckland, Brief Description of the Whole World
- 2001: The Book of Hours, Auckland, Jack Books
- 2001: General Motors, Auckland, Jack Books
- 2010: Stunning Debut of the Repairing of a Life, Dunedin, Otago University Press
- 2010: Nameless, Auckland, Jack Books [in press]
- 2010: Redux, ed. Stephen Banbury, Auckland, Jack Books [in press]
