= Bernard Cadogan =

New Zealand poet, philosopher and historian

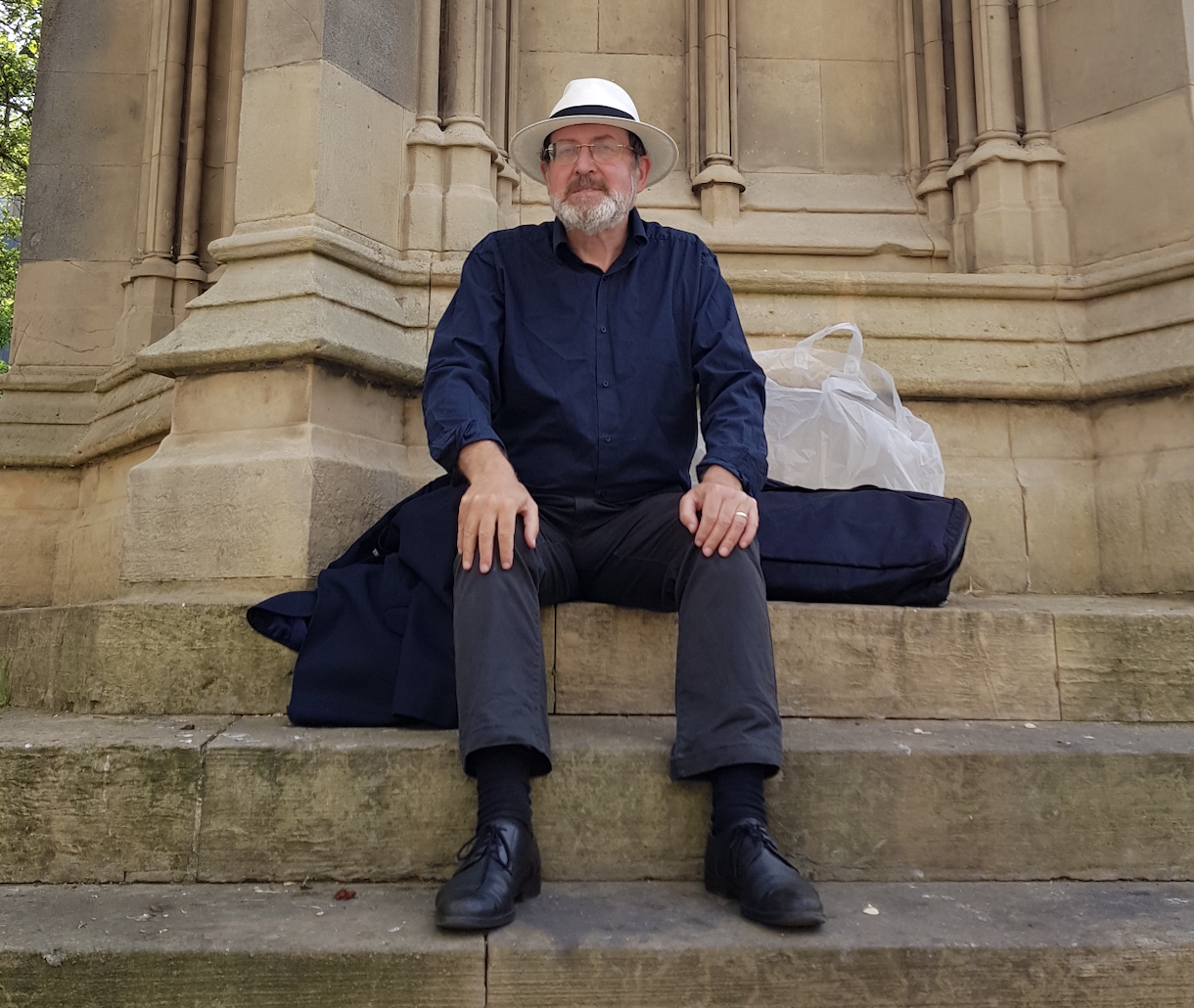
- Bernard Cadogan at the Martyrs' Memorial, Oxford
- Born: Bernard Francis Cadogan; 1961 (age 64–65); Blenheim, New Zealand
- Education: Bishop Viard College, Porirua
- Alma mater: University of Otago; Keble College Oxford; Peterhouse, Cambridge
- Occupations: Poet, political advisor
- Spouse: Jacqueline Richold
- Children: 3
- Writing career
- Notable works: Crete 1941: an epic poem; The loss of madness: a tribute to Hölderlin; Sixty Something Volumes 1 & 2
- Website: bernardcadogan.substack.com

Bernard Francis Cadogan (born on 29 October 1961) is a New Zealand poet, philosopher and historian. He was educated at Bishop Viard College, Otago University, Oxford University (which awarded him a doctorate on Empire Studies and constitutional theory) and Cambridge University.

In 2021, Cadogan published Crete 1941: An Epic Poem, an epic poem about the contributions of New Zealand forces (particularly the 28th (Māori) Battalion) in the Battle of Crete.

== Early education and academic career ==
Cadogan was born in 1961, in Blenheim, Marlborough, New Zealand. He holds citizenships of New Zealand and the Republic of Ireland.

During his school and university years, Cadogan studied ancient Greek and Latin, French and German. His interest in the work of Virgil, the ancient Greek polis, but also the ancient Roman Republic and Imperial Rome form also the background of his own poetic writings. Cadogan studied at the Universities of Otago, Cambridge and Oxford, graduating with a D.Phil. (Doctorate) from the University of Oxford. Since 1985 he has been associated with Peterhouse College, Cambridge University; since 2002 also with Keble College in Oxford.

== As political adviser and strategic planner ==
Since 1996 Cadogan has acted as a policy adviser to several senior New Zealand politicians such as the Rt Hon Bill English, the Rt Hon Dame Jenny Shipley, the Rt Hon Simon Upton and the Hon Trevor Mallard, and since 2011 as an adviser to the New Zealand Treasury. He has served in advisory roles to both National and Labour Party-led governments and also advised the Māori Party between 2008 and 2017. In March 2015 he was appointed advisor to King Tuheitia, the seventh king of the Māori Kīngitanga movement.

Cadogan was a co-initiator of the 2011–13 New Zealand Constitutional Review, mediating between the New Zealand State ('the Crown') and the United Representatives of the New Zealand Māori Tribes. In 2013, Cadogan presented the Review's reports and commented on them in the political media. Cadogan advocated opportunities for increased Māori participation in political and economic decision making. He supported further Pākehā New Zealanders (New Zealanders with European ancestry) engagement in the acknowledgement and up-take of important elements of Māori culture (Taonga Māori) and legal traditions.

== Academic research ==
Cadogan's expertise in historical political philosophy and historiography spans the period from antiquity (Plato, Thucydides) through the Renaissance (Machiavelli) to the period of Victorian colonialism (George Grey). With an eye on the longue durée of historical developments, Cadogan focuses on strategic thinking and planning in political theory, and their implementation in empire building ancient and modern.

Cadogan's contemporary research interests lie in the philosophy of Paul Ricoeur, John Rawls, Charles Taylor and Hans-Georg Gadamer.

In his monograph on the political career of Sir George Grey (1812–98), former Governor of South Australia, twice Governor and Prime Minister of New Zealand and Governor of Cape Colony, Cadogan highlights the connection between Grey's academic education and his political decision-making and style of communication.

== Poetry ==
Significant parts of Cadogan's poetry are written in the form of the sonnet (often as an adaptation of the Spenserian Sonnet), other parts of his poetic work are based on the Ghazal stanza of Old Persian and Sufi poetry. The villanelle form is also frequently employed in his work, for example in Cadogan's lyrical dialogues with the German poet Friedrich Hölderlin. However, Cadogan's reception of historical forms of poetry is never purely retrospective but it is linked to postmodern themes and ideas such as political discourse analysis and philosophical irony.

The virtuoso play with ancient myths, heroes and gods, which Cadogan uses to explain and criticise current political and cultural events, is particularly evident in his verse epic Crete 1941: an epic poem about the Battle of Crete in the second world war. The poem, which consists of 245 sonnets, is only partly about historical military events. The epic poem is a discursive archeology of European colonial and post-colonial concepts of nation and state formation and the role that male ambitions play in driving, and resolving, conflicts. Post-colonialism, resistance to ancient and modern forms of Imperialism and the role of small nations like New Zealand in maintaining international legal order and peace keeping are among the topics discussed in Crete 1941.

Cadogan uses atavisms, forms neologisms and incorporates key terms and quotations from poetic traditions of other languages (te reo Māori, German, French, Latin, Greek) into his poems.

In 2023, The Giant’s Trough Press published the poetry collection Sixty Something Volumes 1 & 2. This collection of poetry explores the intersection of the personal and the political in times of international crises.

== Publications (selection) ==
- Cadogan, Bernard, 'Lace Curtain Catholics': The Catholic Bourgeoisie of the Diocese of Dunedin: 1900–1920, University of Otago, (1984)
- Cadogan, Bernard, Sir George Grey: Inside the Mind of a Terrible and Fatal Man, Penguin Group (NZ), Auckland (2012), ISBN 978-0-670-04559-4
- Cadogan, Bernard, Welfare Policy: Governance History and Political Philosophy, New Zealand Treasury, https://www.treasury.govt.nz/sites/default/files/2013-07/ltfs-cadogan.pdf (2013)
- Cadogan, Bernard, Lords of the Land: Indigenous property rights and the jurisprudence of empire, Journal of Pacific History 51 (1), (2016)
- Cadogan, Bernard, Crete 1941: An Epic Poem, Tuwhiri, Wellington (2021), ISBN 978-0-473-58789-5
- Cadogan, Bernard, The Loss of Madness: A Tribute to Hölderlin, Tuwhiri, Wellington (2022), ISBN 978-0-473-61891-9
- Cadogan, Bernard, Sixty Something Volumes 1 & 2, The Giant’s Trough Press, Wellington (2023) ISBN 978-0-473-68827-1, ISBN 978-0-473-68842-4 ePub
