= Kathleen Hawkins =

New Zealand poet (1883–1981)

Kathleen Jessie Hawkins (17 November 1883 – 31 August 1981) was a Tauranga, New Zealand, poet affectionately known as "The Pioneer Poet". Well known in Tauranga, her best-known volume The Elms and Other Verses ran into several editions or reprints covering historical pioneer subjects. Hawkins was specially interested in the first missionaries who came to Tauranga, and in the Land Wars with their loss of life on both sides.

== Life ==
Hawkins (an only child) was born in Tewkesbury, England, in 1883. The River Avon flowed through the bottom of her garden.

She grew up and was educated in England, and later married a tea and rubber plantation manager in Ceylon: George Hawkins. The two corresponded after George read one of Kathleen's poems and their correspondence soon blossomed into romance.

Hawkins left England to live with George in Ceylon, where they were married two years after their correspondence began. She lived on the plantation for 20 years and mixed with the Ceylonese. She later recalled this time as a happy and colourful period in her life. She had few problems communicating despite only knowing English and said relations between Europeans and Ceylonese were friendly.

The couple had two children: George Hawkins and Mary Gilmer (née Hawkins).

In 1938, the couple retired to Tauranga in New Zealand. George made the lifestyle change away from the heat to a colder climate for health reasons.

She lived in Tauranga for the remainder of her life, some 43 years. George died in 1953 at the age of 79. In Tauranga she established herself as a well known personality with interests in the theatre, writing and the arts. She was a member of The Elms Society.

Kathleen died in 1981 at the age of 97. A note on her appeared in the Bay of Plenty Times. The NZ Biographies Index at the National Library of New Zealand also notes Hawkins.

== Literary output ==
Hawkins wrote verse from an early age. With her cousins, she produced private magazines and illustrated and published her early poetry in them.

As a young woman, she continued publishing poems. During her life, Hawkins never used her poetry for personal gain. Each publication of her work was for a particular charity such as the New Zealand Crippled Children's Society or (during World War II) the airplane fund and the prisoners’ parcels fund.

The full list of her publications is not known, and New Zealand libraries hold only 4 titles by her. Published between 1939 and 1974, they are: The Elms and Other Verses (1939, 1940, 1943, 1943 4th edition); The Pup and other Poems for Parcels (c.1942); The Little Blue Horse and Other Verses (1950); and The Elms & Other Poems: A Selection of Writings by Tauranga’s Pioneer Poet (1974).

Bagnall describes The Pup as ‘Patriotic verses based on wartime incidents’.

In the 1974 edition of The Elms & Other Poems, the list of ‘Other Publications’ shows a further three titles by Hawkins: The Wind in the Rafters, Songs to Buy Wines and Three Flowers for Christmas.

Her children printed The Elms & Other Poems as Hawkins's 91st birthday present. Its centrepiece was believed to be the first illustrated poem of the author at 15 years.

New Zealand poet William E. Morris (Founder Fellow of the International Poetry Society) wrote the foreword to the 1974 edition of The Elms. Morris praised ‘her tremendous ability as a poet’ and noted further that: ‘Tauranga, and New Zealand, can now savour the best of her work. . . Her poems will have carved a niche for themselves in the literature of this country for in her lifetime she has written the poetry of today, simple, direct, but always saying something worthwhile.’

Her poetry is also included and noted in historical publications such as Stanley Bull's Historic Gate Pa, 29th April, 1864: Pukehinahina (1968) and The Historic Bay of Plenty: Te Papa C.M.S. Mission Station, 1838-1883 (1984) or the journal article ‘Wharekahu CMS Mission Station, Maketu’ by A. H. Matheson in the Whakatane & District Historical Society journal Historical Review, May 2003; vol.51 no.1: p. 18-29. Other poems of hers also appeared in this journal.

In 2007, Hawkins had a poem included by the New Zealand poet and anthologist Harvey McQueen in The Earth’s Deep Breathing: Garden Poems by New Zealand Poets.
