= Dominic Hoey =

New Zealand author, poet and rapper

- Born: 1977 (age 48–49)
- Occupations: Novelist; poet; rapper
- Awards: Sunday Star-Times Short Story Award (2021)

Dominic Hoey (born 1977) is an author and musician based in Auckland, New Zealand. Much of his writing deals with working class challenges of poverty and illness, including living with a debilitating bone disease.

Hoey's first creative outlet was as an MC named Tourettes, performing from the early 2000s across New Zealand and Australia. He began working with marginalised youth in 2014, as well as teaching creative writing.

Though he had previously self-released a range of lyrics and stories, his debut novel, Iceland, was released in 2017 by Steele Roberts and was long-listed for the Jann Medlicott Award for Fiction at the Ockham New Zealand Book Awards.

The publishing house Dead Bird Books was created by Hoey and Samuel Walsh in 2018. In speaking about the founding of the publishing group, co-founder Walsh said "we both had experience in publishing records, so we thought, let’s put out books like we’d put out a record and see what happens." The press has released a range of short story collections and poetry and were short-listed for the Mary and Peter Biggs Award for Poetry at the Ockham New Zealand Book Awards, for Mohamed Hassan's 2021 National Anthem. Hoey's collection of poems, I Thought We'd Be Famous was released in 2019 with Dead Bird Books.

In 2021, Hoey won the Sunday Star-Times Short Story Awards with "1985". The judge's award described the story as "a sharply observant social commentary on the Grey Lynn neighbourhood in the days before gentrification" and a "power-packed story of dread and sadness, as well as tenderness and retribution."

Hoey's second novel Poor People with Money was published by Penguin in 2022 and was widely acclaimed, with one reviewer saying as "Poor People With Money is so rich and madly entertaining that I'm just going to read it again, immediately, as should you" with the book being described as "the year's most exciting novel" and "a sharp jab from the heart of life on the poverty line in Aotearoa." Steve Braunias described the book as one of the year's best, and, on its exclusion from the Book Awards, one reviewer noted that it was "a terrific novel of pace and tightly controlled chaos, with a unique voice, empathy and humour."

In a 2023 interview, Hoey described the challenges and benefits of his dyslexia. He also discussed his role as a creative writing teacher for students who don't fit the traditional university style. Hoey wrote, "If you’re poor, working class, neurodivergent, disabled or not formally educated, It really feels like you’re not part of the club."

Penguin released the novel, 1985, in 2025. The novel received positive reviews and was longlisted for the Ockham New Zealand Book Awards.

On 8 May, Hoey announced on social media that Port was due to be released in 2027 with Allen & Unwin also acquiring the rights to a subsequent novel slated for 2029.
