= Michael Botur =

New Zealand writer

Michael Stephen Botur (born 8 March 1984) is a New Zealand author. As a journalist, he has published longform news articles in VICE World News, NZ Listener, New Zealand Herald, Herald on Sunday, Sunday Star-Times, The Spinoff, Mana and North & South. His short fiction and poetry has been published in most New Zealand literary journals including Landfall, Poetry New Zealand and Newsroom. In 2023 he founded the mentoring service Creative Writing Northland.

== Life and career ==
Born in Christchurch, Botur first began publishing poetry and experimental fiction as an English major at the University of Otago. He was part of a group publishing the creative writing zine Blindswimmer. Botur's earliest creative writing publication credits, between 2004 and 2009, were in New Zealand and international literary magazines, zines and websites including Takahe, JAAM, Bravado, The Lumiere Reader, Prima Storia, Deep South, Catalyst, Sidestream, Insight, Subject, Blindswimmer, A3, Critic, Potroast, Debate and F*nk, Canada's The Med and NiL. He won the Her magazine short story competition in 2008. Botur completed a Master of Creative Writing degree in 2009 at Auckland University of Technology, publishing a collection of short stories as his thesis including a dissertation on subcultures, then trained as a journalist with Massey University. Botur essayed in The Spinoff on 26 July 2017 about moving to Northland in 2015 and "finding income and inspiration in its very small economy", working at The Warehouse and other labour-intensive jobs, and finding story ideas.

In 2019, Botur was featured at the Rotorua Noir Crime Writing Festival.

In mid-2019, Botur launched a programme of publishing short stories every day for 100 days on social media and encouraged other New Zealand writers to do the same. The #100NZStories100days campaign encouraged Kiwi writers to post links to flash fiction and short prose already published in literary magazines and blogs. Botur said in an NZ Book Council news story: "I have a philosophy of ‘There’s no time like the present’ with a lot of my publishing. Fiction writers endure many forces which delay the publication of our work when we're keen to share it with the world. Life is short and I don't think it's right that publishers and competitions will keep an author waiting up to 12 months to share their work with the world."

Botur published Loudmouth: Page and Pub Poems under the Wild West Writing imprint in December 2019 and began touring the book. Launched in Whangārei 6 December 2019, Loudmouth has been performed in Auckland, Rotorua, Tauranga and Christchurch.

Loudmouth: Page and Pub Poems has been or is scheduled to be performed at festivals including: Rotorua Noir - 26 January 2019 Whangārei Fringe Festival - 19 October 2020. Earth Beat Festival - 20 March 2021 In January 2021 Botur received a grant to perform Loudmouth: Page and Pub Poems and deliver creative writing workshops in Tauranga. Botur recorded Loudmouth as an album and launched on Spotify, iTunes, Bandcamp and Amazon Music in March 2021 and an official launch in Whangārei on 1 April 2021.

Botur began focusing on horror fiction with his debut horror short story collection The Devil Took Her: Tales of Horror (2022) which was shortlisted for multiple literary awards. He followed The Devil Took Her with Bloodalcohol: Ten Tales (2023), published with Next Chapter. Botur began focusing on screenwriting from 2022. The screenplay for the award-winning story Test of Death was shortlisted in US screenwriting competitions including Finalist at Filmquest 2023 and Semi-finalist in Genreblast Script Contest 2023. Botur was the first New Zealand author to sell multiple short stories to long-running US horror podcast 'Chilling Tales for Dark Nights' including 'Racing Hearts', 'Test of Death', 'The Strange Paper', and 'Fake ID'. In 2024, Botur contributed short stories to anthologies including Australian/New Zealand crime fiction compilation Dark Deeds Downunder 2 and parenting writing collection Rere Takitahi - Flying Solo In 2025, Botur published crime novel Glass Barbie (Lasavia Publishing). The novel follows 'Cockroach' Karl Copley, a crackhead crim with a small brain and a big mouth, who convinces his former best friend Richie McMullan - now a squeaky-clean senior cop - he can help rescue Barbara 'Barbie' Konstantinou, a high school crush apparently held for ransom by bikers in New Zealand's sunny north. The novel was entered in the 2025 Ngaio Marsh NZ Crime Writing Awards and Botur toured the book with poetry performances in Northland, Auckland and Waiheke Island. Reviewer Karen Chisholm at Australasian Crime Fiction described the novel as "Wild, ranty, full to brim with nobody including the good, bad, and slightly deluded winning at anything".

Reviewer Andrea Molloy at NZ Book Lovers described the novel as "Darkly humorous and unapologetically raw [...] a gritty ride through the underbelly of small-town crime in New Zealand.".

Reviewer Karen Chisholm at Australasian Crime Fiction described the book as "Wild, ranty, full to brim with nobody including the good, bad, and slightly deluded winning at anything".

In September 2025, Botur co-wrote 'Family Christmas Monopoly' with Giles McNeill and Team Northland which won numerous regional awards in the 48 Hour Film Competition before reaching the finals in three categories for the national 48 Hour Competition.

In November 2025, Botur was one of the writers in Folly #003, a Wellington literary journal which caused controversy for being refused sales by bookseller Whitcoulls. Botur's published piece was the flash fiction story Afraid of the Light.

== Published works ==
Botur's published works include:

- Glass Barbie (2024)
- Bloodalcohol: Ten Tales (2023)
- The Devil Took Her: Tales of Horror (2022)
- The Lockdownland Trilogy (2022)
- My Animal Family: (2021)
- Moneyland: Payback (2020)
- Hell of a Thing: Sixteen stories (2020)
- Crimechurch (2020)
- Loudmouth: page and pub poems (2019)
- True? (2018)
- Moneyland, a science fiction dystopian novel (2018)
- Lowlife(2017)
- Spitshine (2016)
- Mean: short stories (2013)
- Hot Bible! (2012)

== Awards ==
Botur's awards and nominations include:

- Daphne de Jong Short Fiction Award 2025 -NZ Society of Authors
- 2025 NZ Society of Authors Northland Short Story Award - 1st Place for One Week To Live
- 2025 Katherine Mansfield Sparkling Prose Competition - Runner-up finalist for One Week To Live
- 2024 Mercedes Webb Pullman Poetry Award- 2nd for Before the Shots Went Off
- 2023 NZ Society of Authors Northland Short Story Award - 2nd Place for Weedling
- 2024 Sir Julius Vogel Awards - Finalist - Best Novelette - for Luke's Lesson and Starving; Finalist - Best Collected Work for 'Bloodalcohol'; Finalist - Best Professional Artwork for 'Bloodalcohol'
- Australasian Horror Writers Association Robert N Stephenson Short Story Award 2024 - 2nd place for Heaven Is Hungry
- Australasian Horror Writers Association Robert N Stephenson Short Story Award 2023 - 2nd place for WorldStar & Son
- 2022 Australian Shadows Awards - Best Collection - Finalist for The Devil Took Her: Tales of Horror
- 2023 Sir Julius Vogel Awards - Finalist - Best Collected Work - for The Devil Took Her: Tales of Horror
- Whangārei Flash Fiction Award - 1st Place for Dad, Here's Us
- Short story Test of Death won the Australasian Horror Writers Association short story award
- Crime fiction novelCrimechurch - nominated for the 2021 Ngaio Marsh Awards for New Zealand crime fiction writing.
- Crimechurch - entered in the 2021 Ockham NZ Book Awards.
- Short story collection Hell of a Thing - entered in the 2021 Ockham NZ Book Awards.
- Novel Moneyland: Payback - nominated for the Best Youth Novel, 2021 Sir Julius Vogel Awards.
- Horror stories The Writing on the Rat and The Day I Skipped School nominated for the Sir Julius Vogel Awards 2021.
- Short Story Land 6-Month Competition - 1st place 2019
- Whangārei Libraries Flash Fiction Competition 2019 – 2nd
- Northland Short Story Award – for highest Northland place in the National Flash Fiction Day Competition
- North & South Short Story Story Competition 2019 – 2nd
- Whangārei Libraries Flash Fiction Comp 2015 – first and second-place winner
- Guest Fiction Writer (August 2014) – Tākahe magazine
- Miles Hughes Award – third place in 2014
- Takahe poetry competition 2012 – runner-up
- Dan Davin Literary Award 2009 – highly commended
- NZSA Short Story Competition 2008/09 – third place, for ‘Latter Day Lepers’
- Kiwi Short Story Competition, 2009 – second place, for ‘Home D’
- Her magazine Short Story Competition, 2008 – winner
- F*nk short short story competition, 2005 – second
