= Riemke Ensing =

New Zealand poet (1939–2026)

Riemke Ensing (24 May 1939 – 10 August 2026) was a Dutch-born New Zealand poet. She published and edited numerous books and is notable for synthesising European and New Zealand influences in her work.

== Early life and education ==
Ensing was born in Groningen, The Netherlands on 24 May 1939. She immigrated to New Zealand in 1951 at age twelve. She studied at Ardmore Teachers' Training College, then taught for two years, returning to the College to lecture in English literature for a year.

== Career ==
Ensing earned a master's degree in 1967, and was appointed to a position in Literature in the English Department at the University of Auckland. There she taught until 1999 when she took early retirement and was later appointed an Honorary Research Fellow (Faculty of Arts). In 2002 she was awarded a Sargeson Fellowship, sponsored by the law firm Buddle Findlay. She received an Honours List Award from the New Zealand Society of Authors in 2019.

In 1977, Ensing edited Private Gardens: An Anthology of New Zealand Women Poets. It was the first anthology of women's verse published in New Zealand. She established her reputation with three books published in 1995: Dear Mr Sargeson was written in homage after visiting the cottage of the writer Frank Sargeson in Takapuna; Like I have seen the dark green ladder climbing was written about the paintings of Eion Stevens; in Gloria-in-Excelsis, Ensing edited the poems of Gloria Rawlinson. Her earlier poems showed European influences but during the 1980s and 1990s New Zealand influences and voices became more prominent. Ensing had an interest in art, publishing catalogues of exhibitions by Stanley Palmer in 1992 and Len Castle in 2008. Talking Pictures: Selected Poems, a major anthology of her poetry was published by HeadworX in 2000.

In March 2026, Ensing published a substantial new collection of poems from 2000-2025, Blue is a Cracked Vase in Memory. As of August 2026, Deborah Shepard is writing a biography of Ensing.

== Death ==
Ensing died at Muriwai on 10 August 2026, at the age of 87. Deborah Shepard, in her University of Auckland obituary for Riemke, quoted Cold Hub Press publisher Roger Hickin’s evaluation of the poet, ‘Riemke is our greatest elegiac poet.’ In farewelling the poet she wrote,

it is her own words that provide inspiration, from the final stanza of "This is not Goodbye" for painter Eion Stevens. The sky seems to be waiting–that still point / to inner freedom–touching the blue / you embraced from the beginning. / Later stars will continue to tell your stories.

== Works ==
=== Poetry books ===
- Making Inroads – Invocation for the New Zealand Women's Convention, Hamilton, 1979, Coal Black Press, Auckland, 1980
- Letters, The Lowry Press, University of Auckland, 1982
- Topographies, (graphics by Nigel Brown) Prometheus Press, Auckland, 1984
- Spells from Chagall, The Griffin Press, Panmure, Auckland, 1987
- The K.M. File and Other Poems with Katherine Mansfield, Hazard Press, Christchurch, Melbourne, 1993.
- Poetry NZ 9 featured poet, ed. Alistair Paterson, Brick Row, Auckland, 1994.
- Like I Have Seen The Dark Green Ladder Climbing, The Pear Tree Press, Auckland, 1995
- Dear Mr. Sargeson..., Cape Catley, Whatamango Bay, Queen Charlotte Sound, 1995
- Finding the Ancestors – poems to celebrate the occasion of the first Dutch Language and Culture Conference of its kind in New Zealand, Pear Tree Press, Auckland, May 1999.
- Tarawera Te Maunga Tapu, The Pear Tree Press, Auckland, 1999
- Talking Pictures–Selected Poems, HeadworX, Wellington, 2000
- Storm warning, after McCahon : poems, R. Ensing, Auckland, 2003
- This is a man who has bared his soul, Pear Tree Press, Auckland, 2007
- Black, Green Bay Press, Auckland, 2010
- broadsheet 15 featured poet, ed. Mark Pirie, The Night Press, Wellington, 2015
- If only, Pear Tree Press, Auckland, 2017
- Blue is a Cracked Vase in Memory: Poems 2000-2025, Cold Hub Press, Lyttelton, 2026

=== Edited ===
- Private Gardens–an anthology of New Zealand Women Poets, Caveman Press, Dunedin, 1977
- Poetry NZ 5, Brick Row Publishers, Auckland, 1992
- Gloria in Excelsis–a selection of poems by Gloria Rawlinson– in celebration, The Pear Tree Press, Auckland, 1995
