= Gloria Rawlinson =

New Zealand writer and editor

Gloria Jasmine Rawlinson (1 October 1918 – 25 July 1995) was a New Zealand poet, novelist, short-story writer and editor. She was born in Ha'apai, Tonga, in 1918, the daughter of Ethel Rose (Rosalie) Jennings and Alexander John Rawlinson.

== Biography ==
After arriving in New Zealand in 1924, Rawlinson was affected by the poliomyelitis epidemic with infantile paralysis. After being hospitalised for four years, she remained paralysed and using a wheelchair for her life. Despite her incapacitation, Rawlinson was responsible for the care of her mother and uncle, until they passed in 1988 and 1993 respectively.

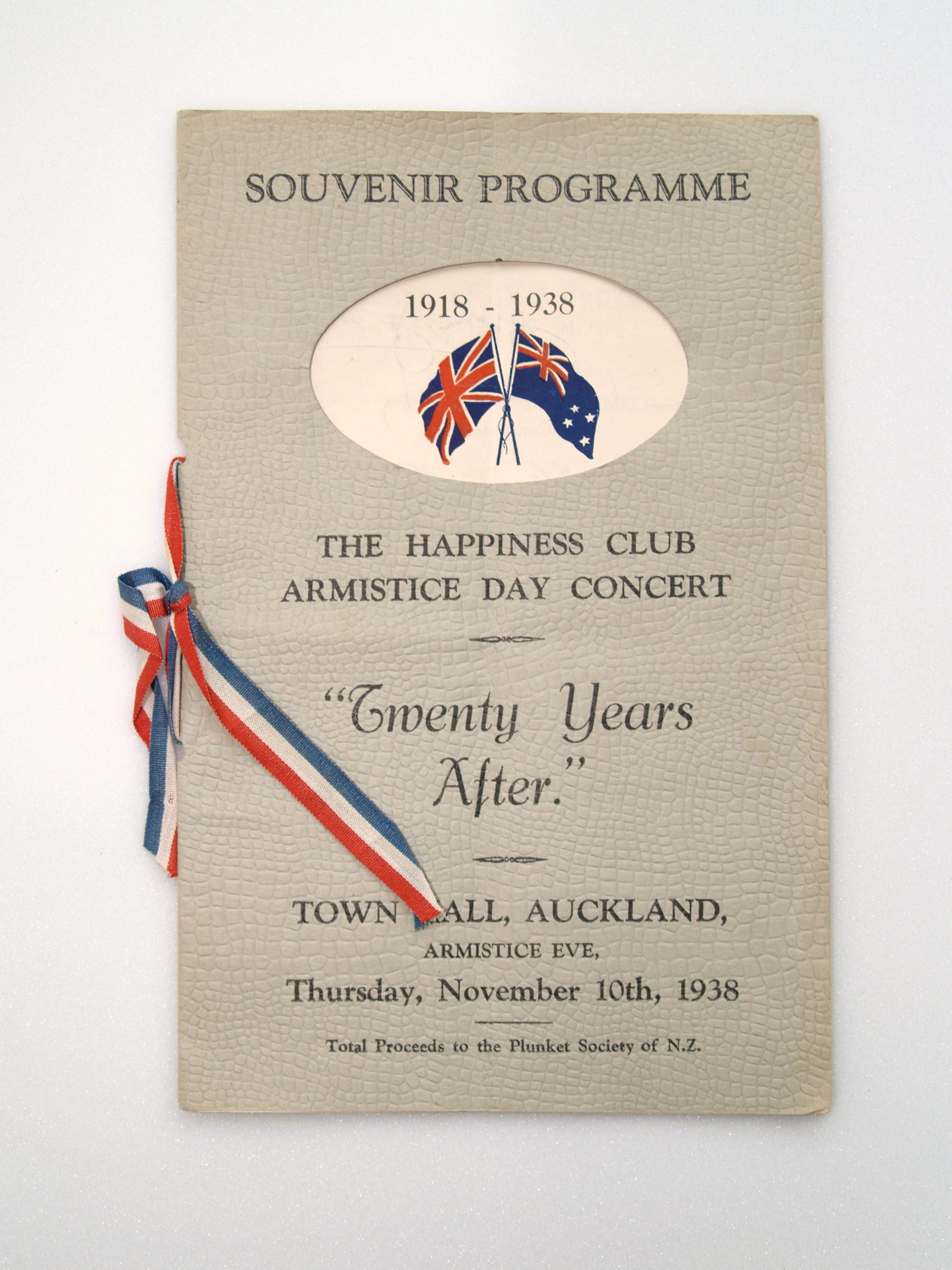
Twenty Years After Programme

Her work in literature is what brought her to fame. Rawlinson has been called a "child poet" as her first poetry collection, Gloria's Book, was published in 1933 when she was between 14 and 15 years old. Rawlinson's second book of poems, The Perfume Vendor, was published in 1935. This work sold 7,000 copies and was translated into Dutch and Japanese. Most her work was written from her home on Market Road in Epsom, Auckland.

=== 1938 Concert Programme ===
Gloria Rawlinson co-conducted The Happiness Club Armistice Day, "Twenty Years After", in November 1938.

The proceeds went to the Plunket Society.

=== Friendship with Robin Hyde ===
Rawlison met Robin Hyde in 1933, when Rawlison was 16 and Hyde was between 27 and 28. Hyde was a supporter of her work, and wrote the preface to The Perfume Vendor. Rawlinson, too, was a champion of Hyde, continuing to promote her work after Hyde's death in 1939. Rawlinson edited and introduced several collections of Hyde's work, including Houses By the Sea, 1952, and the 1970 autobiographical novel The Godwits Fly.

Rawlinson worked for many years collecting material for a biography of Hyde, which she was unable to complete before her death. A large collection of around 600 poems of Hyde's that Rawlinson organised are held in the University of Auckland Waipapa Taumata Rau Special Collections. Hyde's son Derek Challis drew on Rawlinson's work, and The Book of Iris: A Life of Robin Hyde was published in 2002 and credited Rawlinson as a co-author.

== Selected Works ==
Rawlinson published in newspapers, literary journals and magazines throughout her life, including in the Sun and the New Zealand Herald.

=== Poetry Collections ===
- Gloria's Book, 1933
- The Perfume Vendor, Hutchinson, 1935
- The Islands Where I Was Born, The Handcraft Press, 1936
- Of Clouds and Pebbles, Paul's Book Arcade, 1963
- Gloria in Excelsis: a selection of poems by Gloria Rawlinson, chosen by Riemke Ensing in celebration, Pear Tree Press, 1995

=== Novels ===
- Music in the listening-place, 1938
