= Siobhan Harvey =

New Zealand writer (born 1973)

Siobhan Harvey (born 1973) is a New Zealand and UK author, editor and creative writing lecturer. She writes poetry, fiction and creative nonfiction. In 2021, she was awarded the Janet Frame Literary Trust Award for Poetry.

== Early life ==
Harvey was born in Staffordshire, England in 1973. She graduated from the University of London, Sheffield Hallam University (MA in Creative Writing, 2001) and Auckland University of Technology (PhD in Creative Writing, 2021).

== Career ==
Harvey is the author of eight books. Her first New Zealand collection was Lost Relatives (Steele Roberts, 2011). Her second collection, Cloudboy (Otago University Press, 2014) won New Zealand's richest prize for poetry, the Kathleen Grattan Award, in 2013. In 2021, a collection of Harvey's poetry and creative nonfiction, Ghosts (Otago University Press) was launched at the Auckland Writers Festival. Poems in the book had been awarded the 2019 Kathleen Grattan Award for a Sequence of Poems, the 2020 Robert Burns Poetry Competition and the 2020 New Zealand Society of Authors Peter and Diane Beatson Fellowship.

Harvey’s fiction has been published in literary journals and anthologies, such as Asia Literary Review (Hong Kong), Griffith Review (Australia) and Best of Auckland (Writers Café, 2020). Her fiction won a 2016 Write Well Award (Silver Pen, US).

Her creative nonfiction has been published in Griffith Review (Australia), Landfall and the anthology Feminine Rising: Voices of Power and Invisibility (Cyren Press, 2019). She has been shortlisted for the Landfall Essay Competition on multiple occasions, including being placed runner up (2011) and third (2020).

Harvey’s poetry has been selected three times for Best New Zealand Poems series: 2012 (guest editor, Ian Wedde) 2020 (guest editor, David Eggleton) and 2022 (guest editor, Louise Wallace) and has been placed runner-up in 2015 and 2014 New Zealand Poetry Society International Poetry Competitions, the 2012 Dorothy Porter Poetry Prize (Australia) and the 2012 Kevin Ireland Poetry Competition.

Harvey has served as the president of the New Zealand Society of Authors (2017–2019), New Zealand’s National Poetry Day Coordinator (2008–2013) and Poetry Editor, takahē literary magazine (2007–2014).

In 2021, she was awarded the Janet Frame Literary Trust Award for Poetry.

In 2022, Harvey's book, Ghosts was longlisted for the Mary and Peter Biggs Award for Poetry at 2022 New Zealand Book Awards.

In 2023, Harvey won the Landfall Essay Competition for her essay, 'A Jigsaw Of Broken Things'.

Also in 2023, Harvey was shortlisted for the Monica Taylor Poetry Prize.

In 2024, Harvey was highly commended in the Bridport Memoir Award.

In 2025, Harvey was a Category winner: Memory, Representation, Survival, LGBTQI+ and Queer Identity in the 2025 Memoir Prize (US).

In 2026, Harvey was selected as the Caselberg Trust Margaret Egan Cities of Literature Writers Resident.

== Works ==
Memoir

- 2026 What We Remember, What We Forget

Poetry and Nonfiction

- 2021 Ghosts

Poetry

- 2014 Cloudboy
- 2011 Lost Relatives

Edited works

- 2014 Essential New Zealand Poems
- 2010 Words Chosen Carefully: New Zealand Writers in Discussion
- 2009 Our Own Kind: 100 New Zealand Poems about Animals
