= Best New Zealand Poems =

Online anthology

Ōrongohau | Best New Zealand Poems is an annual online anthology of poems chosen by guest editors. The anthology began in 2001 and is published by the International Institute of Modern Letters at Victoria University of Wellington in New Zealand. It is supported by a grant from Creative New Zealand.

== History ==
In 2001, poet and professor Bill Manhire of the International Institute of Modern Letters founded Best New Zealand Poems. The anthology is published online and features 25 poems from New Zealand poets, each year selected by a different guest editor. Journalist Philip Matthews has described it as "a reliable guide to local poetry". The first annual editor, Iain Sharp, wrote in his introduction to the 2001 selection that the site's approach was inspired by The Best American Poetry series. He also noted that the poems must have been published that year either in magazines or books, and that in order to qualify as New Zealand poetry, a "steady association with the country is sufficient".

Due to Manhire's association with the anthology and role as series editor, his own poems were originally ineligible for inclusion. In his introduction to the 2005 selection, Andrew Johnston wrote, "I couldn't include a poem from Manhire's latest and best book, Lifted, because he is effectively the publisher of Best New Zealand Poems." In 2011 Manhire stepped down from the series editor role, and his poem "The Schoolbus" was selected by editor Bernadette Hall.

In 2003, Shelley Howells, a columnist for The New Zealand Herald, noted the features on the website, including links to publishers, New Zealand literary sites, poet biographies, and poets' comments on their work, provide a "more bang for your verse' approach" that is "more satisfying than simply reading a poem on a page".

In 2007, Manhire noted that most of the website's viewers were from overseas, and that the online publication allowed the anthology to break "through the distribution barrier which prevents New Zealand poetry from reaching an international audience".

In 2011, Te Herenga Waka University Press published The Best of Best New Zealand Poems, an anthology edited by Bill Manhire and Damien Wilkins.

== Annual selections ==
Unlike Best American Poetry, each year's selection is identified by the year in which the poems were first published, not by the year in which the selection is put out: so the 2001 list, for instance, came out in 2002.

=== 2001 ===
The editor, Iain Sharp, is books editor of the Sunday Star-Times and himself a poet and critic. In his introduction, Sharp wrote that although he has a preference for poets like Billy Collins, he tried to include a variety of poets in his selection. Sharp also wrote that he found it impossible to properly excerpt Michael O'Leary's book-length love poem, He Waiatanui Kia Aroha, or take a single poem out of Hone Tuwhare's Piggyback Moon because none "seemed quite to capture the warm, rebellious spirit of the whole."

- James K. Baxter
- Jenny Bornholdt
- Bernard Brown
- James Brown
- Alan Brunton
- Kate Camp
- Alistair Te Ariki Campbell
- Allen Curnow
- Leigh Davis
- Chloe Gordon
- Bernadette Hall
- Dinah Hawken
- Anna Jackson
- Jan Kemp
- James Naughton
- Gregory O'Brien
- Peter Olds
- Bob Orr
- Vincent O'Sullivan
- Chris Price
- Richard Reeve
- Elizabeth Smither
- Brian Turner
- Ian Wedde
- Nick Williamson

=== 2002 ===
This year's editor, Elizabeth Smither, recalled what Allen Curnow, a New Zealand poet who died in 2001, said about "the visceral nature of true poetry. 'Try poking it with a stick and see if it's alive,’ was Allen's test for a poem and it has been my first line of selection." Smither also used her assumptive "editor's privilege" to wedge in a 26th poem at the end of her introduction: Jon Bridges' "Poem for the Beasts".

- Jenny Bornholdt
- Diana Bridge
- Rachel Bush
- Kate Camp
- Glenn Colquhoun
- Murray Edmond
- Paula Green
- Michael Harlow
- David Howard
- Andrew Johnston
- Anne Kennedy
- Michele Leggott
- Emma Neale
- Bob Orr
- Chris Orsman
- Vincent O'Sullivan
- Bill Sewell
- Anna Smaill
- Kendrick Smithyman
- C. K. Stead
- Robert Sullivan
- Jo Thorpe
- Rae Varcoe
- Louise Wrightson
- Sonja Yelich

=== 2003 ===
This year's editor, Robin Dudding, citing a similar comment by John Ashbery in The Best American Poetry 1988, discounted the idea that the best 25 poems of a country can be picked, since any editor will be inevitably biased and won't be able to find all the best poems. It might be better to call the selection "OK New Zealand poems", Dudding indicated.

"There seem to be two possible selection approaches: attempt to find worthy examples of as wide a range of poetic expression as possible; or plump for the poems that you like best, even if there is the risk of too markedly revealing one's own taste or lack of taste," Dudding wrote. He and his wife, who helped with the selection, "plumped fairly firmly for the latter course." They included Robin Hyde who died in 1906 on the basis that many of her poems were first published in 2003.

Iain Sharp, in a review for the Sunday Star-Times, said the 2003 selection "doesn't contain a single dud" and noted that Dudding was "widely regarded as the country's most astute literary editor".

- David Beach
- Peter Bland
- Jenny Bornholdt
- Kate Camp
- Gordon Challis
- Geoff Cochrane
- Fiona Farrell
- Cliff Fell
- Sia Figiel
- Rhian Gallagher
- Robin Hyde
- Kevin Ireland
- Anna Jackson
- Anne Kennedy
- Graham Lindsay
- Anna Livesey
- Karlo Mila
- James Norcliffe
- Gregory O'Brien
- Bob Orr
- Chris Price
- Sarah Quigley
- Elizabeth Smither
- Brian Turner
- Richard von Sturmer

=== 2004 ===
Emma Neale, this year's editor, in her introduction proclaimed Ahmed Zaoui's "In a Dream" (translated in a "chain of versions" in brief 31, Spring 2004), "if not the best, then the most important poem this year", because of the political issues involved in Zaoui's circumstances (or as Neale put it, for "its role as a nexus of politics and aesthetics"): He sought refugee status in New Zealand and had been imprisoned for two years, as of the time Neale wrote, on suspicion of ties to terrorists. She added that he hadn't been brought to trial "in accordance with United Nations human rights conventions." Although Auden said "Poetry makes nothing happen," Neale said a poem can lend support to a political cause powered by other means.

"When I read a fine poem," Neale wrote, "there is usually a sense of actively arriving at layers of new knowledge, of discovering experience, or even belief, simultaneously with the speaker or personality in that poem. All of the poems I’ve chosen exhibit something of this character."

- Tusiata Avia
- Hinemoana Baker
- Diane Brown
- James Brown
- Geoff Cochrane
- Linda Connell
- Wystan Curnow
- Anne French
- Paula Green
- David Howard
- Andrew Johnston
- Tim Jones
- Anne Kennedy
- Tze Ming Mok
- Peter Olds
- Vincent O'Sullivan
- Vivienne Plumb
- Richard Reeve
- Elizabeth Smither
- Kendrick Smithyman
- C. K. Stead
- Brian Turner
- Sue Wootton
- Sonja Yelich
- Ashleigh Young

=== 2005 ===
In his introduction, Andrew Johnston (this year's editor) wrote that New Zealand poetry used to be very much like British poetry still is today, which he described as "domesticated", "unsurprising", "well-behaved" and closely following "a single register, the poet getting quietly worked up about something in the plainest conversational tone."

The influence of American poetry loosened up New Zealand's poets, according to Johnston, so that the nation's poetry today has a variety of voices and styles, and there is also a tolerance in the country for different kinds of poetry. Bill Manhire and Ian Wedde were two of the poets who helped bring about the revolution, he added.

- Michele Amas
- Angela Andrews
- Stu Bagby
- Jenny Bornholdt
- James Brown
- Janet Charman
- Geoff Cochrane
- Mary Cresswell
- Wystan Curnow
- Stephanie de Montalk
- Fiona Farrell
- Bernadette Hall
- Anne Kennedy
- Michele Leggott
- Anna Livesey
- Karlo Mila
- James Norcliffe
- Gregory O'Brien
- Vivienne Plumb
- Anna Smaill
- Elizabeth Smither
- Robert Sullivan
- Brian Turner
- Ian Wedde
- Sonja Yelich

=== 2006 ===
The editors for 2006 were literary couple Anne Kennedy and Robert Sulivan, both of whom were listed in the previous year's selection. The editors commented that 2006 seemed to have produced proportionally far fewer poems by Maori and Asian writers than appeared in other years. They speculated that such writers were either not seeking publication, or not achieving it. They noted that "So much in writing, from our experience, depends upon the encouragement of publishers, editors and educators."

"In selecting this year's Best New Zealand Poems we did our best" the editors said, "to scout the diverse ethnic and intellectual communities that New Zealand poets belong to." Despite the editorial emphasis on diversity, 11 of the 25 poems selected were published in association with Victoria University. Of the remaining 14 poems, 8 were published in association with the University of Auckland; leaving just five poems that were not released under the aegis of either University.

The fact that both poets reside in Honolulu, and had to rely in part on "the help of the Institute of Modern Letters team who sent us care packages from home" may account for this curious distribution. However, the editors themselves emphasise the broad range of poetry they scoured to create this list. "As well as reading books by individual poets, we read poems from anthologies, magazines, arts journals, e-journals and other websites."

- Hinemoana Baker
- Cherie Barford
- Jenny Bornholdt
- James Brown
- Alistair Te Ariki Campbell
- Geoff Cochrane
- Murray Edmond
- David Eggleton
- Cliff Fell
- Brian Flaherty
- Paula Green
- Bernadette Hall
- Anna Jackson
- Andrew Johnston
- Michele Leggott
- Selina Tusitala Marsh
- Karlo Mila
- Gregory O'Brien
- Brian Potiki
- Chris Price
- Elizabeth Smither
- C. K. Stead
- JC Sturm
- Richard von Sturmer
- Alison Wong

=== 2007 ===
The year's guest editor is Paula Green, who wrote that Chris Price's poem, "Harriet and the Matches" was the "scorchingly best" poem, which she reprinted in her introduction, although Price's work was not on the list of 25 selections. In her introduction, Green gave a list of "a simultaneous cluster of best poems" by these poets: Saradha Koirala Erin Scudder, Harry Ricketts, Ashleigh Young, Helen Rickerby, Tusiata Avia, Sue Wootton, Marty Smith, S. K. Johnson, Kay McKenzie Cooke, David Howard, Jennifer Compton, Wystan Curnow, Richard von Sturmer, Sue Reidy, Charlotte Simmons, Rae Varcoe, Fiona Kidman, Jack Ross, Airini Beautrais, Amy Brown, Katherine Liddy, Thérèse Lloyd, and Scott Kendrick. As had Kennedy and Sullivan in the previous year's introduction, Green complained that there weren't more Maori and Asian poems published during the year. But there were plenty of submissions overall, she wrote, "At one point in January the stack of best poems on my floor stood at 20 cms [sic]."

- Johanna Aitchison
- Angela Andrews
- Serie (Cherie) Barford
- Sarah Jane Barnett
- Jenny Bornholdt
- Alistair Te Ariki Campbell
- Janet Charman
- Geoff Cochrane
- Fiona Farrell
- Cliff Fell
- Bernadette Hall
- Anna Jackson
- Andrew Johnston
- Anne Kennedy
- Jessica Le Bas
- Dora Malech
- Alice Miller
- Emma Neale
- Vincent O'Sullivan
- Vivienne Plumb
- Richard Reeve
- Elizabeth Smither
- C. K. Stead
- Robert Sullivan
- Alison Wong

=== 2008 ===
2008's guest editor was James Brown.

- Johanna Aitchison
- Hinemoana Baker
- Emma Barnes
- David Beach
- Peter Bland
- Jenny Bornholdt
- Amy Brown
- Cliff Fell
- Joan Fleming
- Bernadette Hall
- Sam Hunt
- Lynn Jenner
- Michele Leggott
- Jean McCormack
- Emma Neale
- Gregory O'Brien
- Bob Orr
- Chris Orsman
- Richard Reeve
- Sam Sampson
- Kerrin P. Sharpe
- Tim Upperton
- Richard von Sturmer
- Tom Weston
- Sonja Yelich

=== 2009 ===
2009's guest editor was Robyn Marsack.

- Tusiata Avia
- Sarah Broom
- Geoff Cochrane
- Jennifer Compton
- Lynn Davidson
- John Gallas
- Bernadette Hall
- David Howard
- Lynn Jenner
- Brent Kininmont
- Michele Leggott
- Emma Neale
- James Norcliffe
- Gregory O'Brien
- Chris Price
- Kerrin P. Sharpe
- Marty Smith
- Elizabeth Smither
- C. K. Stead
- Brian Turner
- Tim Upperton
- Louise Wallace
- Ian Wedde
- Douglas Wright
- Ashleigh Young

=== 2010 ===
2010's guest editor was Chris Price.

- Fleur Adcock
- Hinemoana Baker
- Emma Barnes
- Sarah Jane Barnett
- Miro Bilbrough
- Jenny Bornholdt
- James Brown
- Kate Camp
- Geoff Cochrane
- Jennifer Compton
- David Eggleton
- Cliff Fell
- John Gallas
- Anna Jackson
- Lynn Jenner
- Anne Kennedy
- Anna Livesey
- Cilla McQueen
- David Mitchell
- Bill Nelson
- John Newton
- Gregory O'Brien
- Kerrin P Sharpe
- Elizabeth Smither
- Ian Wedde

=== 2011 ===
2011's guest editor was Bernadette Hall.

- John Adams
- Tusiata Avia
- Hera Lindsay Bird
- Peter Bland
- Rachel Bush
- Zarah Butcher-McGunnigle
- Joan Fleming
- Janis Freegard
- Rhian Gallagher
- Rob Hack
- Dinah Hawken
- Anna Jackson
- Brent Kininmont
- Michele Leggott
- Helen Lehndorf
- Kate McKinstry
- Bill Manhire
- Harvey Molloy
- James Norcliffe
- Rachel O'Neill (poet)
- Marty Smith
- Rānui Taiapa
- Tim Upperton
- Louise Wallace
- Douglas Write

=== 2012 ===
2012's guest editor was Ian Wedde.

- Sarah Jane Barnett
- Tony Beyer
- James Brown
- Zarah Butcher-McGunnigle
- Kate Camp
- Geoff Cochrane
- Murray Edmond
- John Gallas
- Siobhan Harvey
- Helen Heath
- David Howard
- Andrew Johnston
- Anne Kennedy
- Aleksandra Lane
- Michele Leggott
- Frankie McMillan
- Gregory O'Brien
- Peter Olds
- Harry Ricketts
- Sam Sampson
- Kerrin P Sharpe
- C K Stead
- Richard von Sturmer
- Albert Wendt
- Ashleigh Young

=== 2013 ===
2013's guest editors were Mark Williams and Jane Stafford.

- Fleur Adcock
- Hinemoana Baker
- Sarah Broom
- Amy Brown
- Kate Camp
- Mary-Jane Duffy
- Murray Edmond
- Johanna Emeney
- Cliff Fell
- Bernadette Hall
- Dinah Hawken
- Caoilinn Hughes
- Anna Jackson
- Anne Kennedy
- Michele Leggott
- Therese Lloyd
- Selina Tusitala Marsh
- John Newton
- Gregory O'Brien
- Rachel O'Neill (poet)
- Vincent O'Sullivan
- Elizabeth Smither
- Chris Tse
- Ian Wedde
- Ashleigh Young

=== 2014 ===
2014's guest editor was Vincent O'Sullivan.

- Peter Bland
- Amy Brown
- Geoff Cochrane
- Kay McKenzie Cooke
- John Dennison
- Cliff Fell
- Rogelio Guedea
- Dinah Hawken
- Caoilinn Hughes
- Kevin Ireland
- Anna Jackson
- Michael Jackson
- Michele Leggott
- Owen Marshall
- Emma Neale
- Gregory O'Brien
- Peter Olds
- Claire Orchard
- Nina Mingya Powles
- Joanna Preston
- Helen Rickerby
- Kerrin P Sharpe
- Marty Smith
- Elizabeth Smither
- Brian Turner

=== 2015 ===
2015's guest editor was John Newton.

- Morgan Bach
- Serie Barford
- Sarah Jane Barnett
- David Beach
- Hera Lindsay Bird
- Wystan Curnow
- John Dennison
- Belinda Diepenheim
- Murray Edmond
- Joan Fleming
- Bernadette Hall
- Dinah Hawken
- Alexandra Hollis
- Brent Kininmont
- Iain Lonie
- Selina Tusitala Marsh
- Frankie McMillan
- Gregory O'Brien
- Vincent O'Sullivan
- Frances Samuel
- kani te manukura
- Steven Toussaint
- Bryan Walpert
- Alison Wong
- Ashleigh Young

=== 2016 ===
2016's guest editor was Jenny Bornholdt.

- Nick Ascroft
- Tusiata Avia
- Airini Beautrais
- Hera Lindsay Bird
- James Brown
- Rachel Bush
- John Dennison
- Ish Doney
- Lynley Edmeades
- Rata Gordon
- Bernadette Hall
- Scott Hamilton
- Adrienne Jansen
- Andrew Johnston
- Anna Livesey
- Bill Manhire
- Leslie McKay
- Bill Nelson
- Claire Orchard
- Vincent O'Sullivan
- Kerrin P. Sharpe
- Marty Smith
- Oscar Upperton
- Tim Upperton
- Ashleigh Young

=== 2017 ===
2017's guest editor was Selina Tusitala Marsh. Marsh said she wanted "to be able to map the latest constellation of Aotearoa's poetry stars and navigate the various poetic journeys being offered from a particular time and place"; the collection included "Pākaitore" by Airini Beautrais about the 1995 protest at Moutoa Gardens.

- Airini Beautrais
- Liz Breslin
- Janet Charman
- Makyla Curtis
- Annelyse Gelman
- Gregory Kan
- Ben Kemp
- Jiaqiao Liu
- Ria Masae
- Courtney Sina Meredith
- Hannah Mettner
- Karlo Mila
- Tru Paraha
- Nina Mingya Powles
- Vaughan Rapatahana
- Emma Shi
- Carin Smeaton
- Marty Smith
- Mere Taito
- Angela Troloven
- Jamie Trower
- Chris Tse
- Louise Wallace
- Albert Wendt
- Briar Wood

=== 2018 ===
2018's guest editor was Fiona Farrell.

- Tusiata Avia
- Hera Lindsay Bird
- Nikki-Lee Birdsey
- Jenny Bornholdt
- James Brown
- Doc Drumheller
- Sam Duckor-Jones
- Lynley Edmeades
- David Eggleton
- Jess Fiebig
- Bernadette Hall
- Anna Jackson
- Erik Kennedy
- Therese Lloyd
- Mary McCallum
- Bill Manhire
- Owen Marshall
- Emma Neale
- essa may ranapiri
- Richard Reeve
- Alice Te Punga Somerville
- Tayi Tibble
- Chris Tse
- Sophie van Waardenberg
- Sue Wootton

=== 2019 ===
2019's guest editor was Hera Lindsay Bird.

- Maha Al Mansour
- Alisdair Armstrong
- Tusiata Avia
- Amy Brown
- Geoff Cochrane
- Harold Coutts
- Freya Daly Sadgrove
- Lynn Davidson
- Carolyn DeCarlo
- Michael Harlow
- Rebecca Hawkes
- Ash Davida Jane
- Simone Kaho
- Gregory Kan
- Wes Lee
- Talia Marshall
- Nithya Narayanan
- Rachel O'Neill (poet)
- essa may ranapiri
- Ursula Robinson Shaw
- Charlotte Simmonds
- Tracey Slaughter
- Ruby Solly
- Tayi Tibble
- Ashleigh Young

=== 2020 ===
2020's guest editor was David Eggleton.

- John Allison
- Tusiata Avia
- Victor Billot
- Diane Brown
- Geoff Cochrane
- Kay McKenzie Cooke
- Doc Drumheller
- Rhian Gallagher
- Rata Gordon
- Siobhan Harvey
- Mohamed Hassan
- David Howard
- Richard Langston
- Michele Leggott
- Bill Manhire
- Talia Marshall
- Ria Masae
- Karlo Mila
- Emma Neale
- Peter Olds
- essa may ranapiri
- Sudha Rao
- Elizabeth Smither
- Michael Steven
- Chris Tse

=== 2021 ===
2021's guest editor was Kate Camp.

- Fleur Adcock
- Nick Ascroft
- Serie Barford
- Emma Barnes
- Nikki-Lee Birdsey
- Danny Bultitude
- Sam Duckor-Jones
- Alison Glenny
- Gus Goldsack
- Tim Grgec
- Dinah Hawken
- Lily Holloway
- Ash Davida Jane
- Pippi Jean
- Anne Kennedy
- Wes Lee
- Mary Macpherson
- Alice Miller
- Joanna Preston
- Harry Ricketts
- Tim Saunders
- Ruby Solly
- Tim Upperton
- Bryan Walpert
- John Weir

=== 2022 ===
2022's guest editor was Louise Wallace.

- Nick Ascroft
- Morgan Bach
- Peter Bland
- James Brown
- Joanna Cho
- Jordan Hamel
- Siobhan Harvey
- Rebecca Hawkes
- Tim Jones
- Simone Kaho
- Michaela Keeble
- Wen-Juenn Lee
- Anahera Maire Gildea
- Elliot McKenzie
- Frankie McMillan
- Khadro Mohamed
- Nafanua Purcell Kersel
- Michelle Rahurahu
- essa may ranapiri
- Alan Roddick
- Frances Samuel
- Sarah Scott
- Elizabeth Smither
- Michael Steven
- Chris Tse

=== 2023 ===
2023's guest editor was Chris Tse.

- John Allison
- Hana Pera Aoake
- Jake Arthur
- Cadence Chung
- harold coutts
- Leah Dodd
- Sam Duckor-Jones
- Dan Goodwin
- Jessica Hinerangi
- Isla Huia
- Arihia Latham
- Michele Leggott
- Jackson McCarthy
- Hannah Mettner
- Ruben Mita
- Sinead Overbye
- Daley Rangi
- Loretta Riach
- Emma Shi
- Tracey Slaughter
- Geena Slow
- Stacey Teague
- Tayi Tibble
- Rushi Vyas

=== 2024 ===
2024's guest editor was Nick Ascroft.

- Fleur Adcock
- Jake Arthur
- James Brown
- John Gallas
- Paula Harris
- Rebecca Hawkes
- Isla Huia
- Ash Davida Jane
- Philomena Johnson
- Lloyd Jones
- Anne Kennedy
- Erik Kennedy
- Selina Tusitala Marsh
- Talia Marshall
- Cilla McQueen
- Emma Neale
- Vincent O'Sullivan
- Robin Peace
- Kiri Piahana-Wong
- Richard Reeve
- Carin Smeaton
- Robert Sullivan
- Simon Sweetman
- Stacey Teague
- Zephyr Zhang 张挚

=== 2025 ===
2025's guest editor was Cilla McQueen.

- Nick Ascroft
- Tusiata Avia
- Victor Billot
- Felix Bornholdt
- Jenny Bornholdt
- Kate Camp
- David Eggleton
- Mauatua Fa'ara-Reynolds
- Rhian Gallagher
- Jac Jenkins
- Jan Kemp
- Erik Kennedy
- Nafanua Purcell Kersel
- Jackson McCarthy
- Bill Manhire
- Ruben Mita
- Bob Orr
- Richard Reeve
- Elizabeth Smither
- Michael Steven
- Alex Stone
- Robert Sullivan
- Ariana Tikao
- Chris Tse
- Whaitiri Tua-Warbrick
