= John Denison =

John Denison may refer to:

- John Denison (MP) (c. 1758–1820), British Member of Parliament for Wootton Bassett 1796–1802, for Colchester 1802–1806, and for Minehead 1807–1812
- John Denison (arts administrator) (1911–2006), British music administrator
- John Denison (engineer) (1916–2001), ice road engineer who operated in the Northwest Territories, Canada
- John G. Denison, acting CEO and chairman of ATA Airlines and Global Aero Logistics, Inc
- John A. Denison (1875–1948), American Politician of the Commonwealth of Massachusetts
- John Evelyn Denison, 1st Viscount Ossington (1800–1873), British statesman
- John Denison (Royal Navy officer) (1853–1939), Canadian member of the Royal Navy

== See also ==
- John Dennison (born 1978), New Zealand poet
- John Dennison, the first elected representative of New Zealand's Opportunities Party
- John Denniston (disambiguation)
