= Essa may ranapiri =

New Zealand poet

essa may ranapiri
- Born: 1993 or 1994 (age 32–33)
- Education: MA (creative writing), Victoria University of Wellington (2018)
- Occupations: Poet, visual artist
- Writing career
- Notable works: Ransack (2019); Echidna (2022)
- Website: essawrites.wordpress.com

essa may ranapiri (born 1993 or 1994) (Ngāti Raukawa, Ngāti Pukeko) is a New Zealand poet and visual artist. Their first collection of poetry, Ransack (2019), was longlisted for the 2020 Ockham New Zealand Book Awards. Their second collection, Echidna, was published in 2022.

== Poetry ==
Ranapiri's first collection, Ransack, was positively reviewed by Always Becominging for its embrace of queer complexity: "Not all poetry lovers will appreciate this collection. Some might find it too dense, experimental, chaotic, demanding. From my perspective it’s those exact qualities that make this work vital." Ranapiri identifies as takatāpui, and has said that this helps them feel comfortable in their Māori identity and to use Māori language in their poetry. They are of Ngāti Raukawa, Te Arawa and Ngāti Pūkeko descent and also have Scottish and English ancestry.

The poems in Echidna interpret the myth of Echidna, mother of monsters in Greek myth now living in a colonised world with other deities. Paula Green described it as "a weave of [essa's] own self, vulnerabilities, fears, dreams, experiences. As a weaving of contemporary spaces, mythological and cultural inheritances, and above all the wounding slam of colonialism." Ash Davida Jane for The Spinoff called it a stand-out of 2022 and an "amorphous collection of mythologies and queer brilliance".

In July 2022, a review of Echidna by Nicholas Reid, published in the New Zealand Listener and in longer form on his personal blog, was criticised by poet Lily Holloway as transphobic and a "deliberately harmful display of ignorance". Holloway opened a petition calling for Reid to be prevented from reviewing any further works by queer writers for the Listener, which attracted over 400 signatures. Critic Steve Braunias called Reid's review "a stupid piece of writing, mainly concerned with the poet's gender and identity". In response, one of the editors of the Listener confirmed that Reid would not be used to review works by LGBTQIA+ authors in the future. The Spinoff published a series of tributes to ranapiri in response to the controversy, with contributions from Hinemoana Baker, Chris Tse and other New Zealand writers. In 2023 ranapiri was the inaugural winner of both the Keri Hulme Award and the Janet Frame Literary Trust Award for Poetry.

== Visual art ==
Ranapiri exhibited paintings at the Queer Algorithms show at the Gus Fisher Gallery in 2019. They described the work as the result of trying to free themself from "the loaded meaning of language that is always present in poetry", while using the colours representing tino rangatiratanga.

== Other work ==
Ranapiri's work has appeared in Out Here: An Anthology of Takatāpui and LGBTQIA+ Writers from Aotearoa, The Spinoff, Starling, Landfall, Ōrongohau: Best New Zealand Poems, Sport and other publications. They have appeared at Verb Wellington, WORD Christchurch, and Auckland Writers Festival, and have created several solo and collaborative zines.
