= Janis Freegard =

New Zealand writer

- Born: 1963 (age 62–63); South Shields
- Occupation: Writer

Janis Freegard is a poet and fiction writer. Her work has been widely published in books, anthologies and literary magazines. She lives in Wellington, New Zealand.

== Biography ==
Janis Freegard was born in 1963 in South Shields, England. She lived in England, South Africa and Australia before her family moved to New Zealand when she was twelve.

She has degrees in botany and plant ecology, and public management.

Her work has appeared in local and international magazines such as The New Zealand Listener, Landfall, Poetry NZ, JAAM, Turbine, The North (UK) and Magma (UK), printed and online anthologies such as Best New Zealand Poems, Essential New Zealand Poems: Facing the Empty Page (Random House, 2014) and Tales for Canterbury, poetry blogs and websites, and has also been broadcast on radio.

For several years, she has published a series of reports into the breakdown of fiction published in New Zealand by gender and ethnicity of the authors, to investigate the state of inequality in publishing and whether New Zealand's national literature can be seen as truly representing the diversity of its population. This work was cited by Lani Wendt Young in her 2019 Read NZ Te Pou Muramura Lecture.

Janis Freegard lives in Wellington and works in the public sector.

== Awards and Prizes ==
In 2001, Freegard won the BNZ Katherine Mansfield Memorial Award for her story ‘Mill’.

In 2014, she held the inaugural Ema Saiko Poetry Fellowship at New Pacific Studio in the Wairarapa.

In 2019, she won the Geometry/Open Book National Poetry competition with her poem ‘Mikey’.

She has taken part in events for National Poetry Day and National Flash Fiction Day and also been among the winners for National Flash Fiction Day.

== Bibliography ==
- AUP New Poets 3, with Katherine Liddy and Reihana Robinson (Auckland University Press, 2008)
- Kingdom Animalia: the Escapades of Linnaeus (Auckland University Press, 2011)
- The Continuing Adventures of Alice Spider (Anomalous Press, 2013)
- The Year of Falling (Makaro Press, 2015)
- The Glass Rooster (Auckland University Press, 2015)
