= John Denniston =

John Denniston may refer to:

- John Denniston (judge) (1845–1919), judge of the Supreme Court in Christchurch, New Zealand
- John Dewar Denniston (1887–1949), British classical scholar

== See also ==
- John Dennison (born 1978), New Zealand poet
- John Denison (disambiguation)
