= Nick Ascroft =

New Zealand writer

- Born: 1973 (age 52–53); Oamaru, New Zealand
- Occupation: Poet
- Writing career
- Language: English
- Notable works: From the Author Of; Back with the Human Condition

Nick Ascroft (born 1973) is a New Zealand poet and writer.

== Life ==
Nick Ascroft was born in Oamaru, New Zealand in 1973. In his career of writing, his poetry has been featured widely in both New Zealand and international journals. Ascroft's published poetry collections have been well received, and he has helped in editing New Zealand literary magazines Landfall, Glottis: New Writing and takahē. Recently he has expanded into non-fiction, writing about football. Ascroft's poetic influences include song lyrics, Bruce Robinson's screenplay for Withnail & I, the wordier skits of Monty Python, Peter Cook or Fry & Laurie, and Tina Fey. Away from writing, Ascroft enjoys competitive Scrabble, indoor soccer, and also identifies as a wikipedian. Ascroft describes the Scrabble urge and the sonnet-writing urge as similar, as they are both about the mathematical puzzle and that he is "genuinely delighted by language."

== Career ==
Nick Ascroft's literary career began in the late 1990s, with three poems, "Circular Table," "Bones" and "The Anatomy of Stars," getting published in the New Zealand literary journal Landfall in 1998. These were the first of many Ascroft poems to be published in the journal over the next couple of decades, with the recent poem "A Writer Wrongs" appearing in Landfall 235 in 2018. In 1998, Ascroft co-founded and co-edited the Dunedin-based journal Glottis, along with poet Richard Reeve. In an editorial, Ascroft described the journal as leaning more heavily towards South Island writers than North Island. While Ascroft and the editors consider Glottis a national magazine, the fact it was based in Dunedin meant that the city was in the magazine's immediate vision.

Ascroft's first collection of poetry, From the Author of, was released in 2000. The reviewer Iain Sharp describes Ascroft as a "maverick [with] clear links to the crowd-wowing troubadour tradition." Sharp states that the "pleasure in reading Ascroft is in watching this quick-witted improviser conjure forth metaphors, mythologies, word-music, then deconstruct them in a flash." In 2003, Ascroft published his second collection of poetry, Nonsense. Ken Bolton, in his review for Landfall, wrote that while "the poems can make you smile and, for a time, not assent," too often "the smile becomes hard to maintain." However, Bolton warmed to the extended sequence of poems called "The Dishwasher's Advocate," which "seemed to me to be indisputably good." Following the publication of his first two poetry collections, Ascroft was awarded (alongside Sarah Quigley) the 2003 Robert Burns Fellowship, which recognised the success and acclaim for his published poetry in his collections and in Landfall. Ascroft also served as guest editor of Landfall in 2005 for a one-off publication.

Ascroft's latest poetry collection Back with the Human Condition was released in 2016. Charlotte Graham described it as "a brilliant book that lets us creep as close to human neuroses and idiosyncrasies as we dare." She finds the work impossible to ignore: "when Ascroft sets off down the lanes of form and style and a surfeit of words tossed everywhere like breadcrumbs, there is nowhere I don’t want to follow." Mary Cresswell described the collection as wonderful, saying that there is "a long-running distinction between people who look on the word as thing or idea and people who look on the word as frisbee. Ascroft is a fine example of the latter. Pay attention to him (and the geminated camel he rode in on)." The poem "Beaux" from this collection was featured in the 2016 Best New Zealand Poems collection. Also in 2016, Ascroft published a book that highlights strategy for struggling indoor football teams. The book, How to Win at 5-a-side, was recommended by Esquire magazine for teams looking to record that first win and “becoming the playground Pirlo you always dreamed of being.”

Ascroft has twice been highly commended in the Kathleen Grattan Award for poetry. In 2015, Ascroft's Nothing is as Inconsiderate as Talking was described by Emma Neale as "a cavorting, satirical imagination" that "hits levels of comedic joy that stand out from any crowd." Two years later, Ascroft's "Moral Sloth" was also highly commended in the award, with Bill Manhire calling it "a virtuoso display of formal skills." Manhire describes Ascroft as matching Alexander Pope and Lord Byron "in quickness of thought and even (it seems to me) outstrip them in richness of diction."

== Works ==
- From the Author of (2000) ISBN 0864733887
- Nonsense (2003) ISBN 0864734514
- Back with the Human Condition (2016) ISBN 9781776560844
- How to Win at 5-a-side (2016) ISBN 9781472917386
- As Long as Rain (2018) ISBN 9781976884818
