= Sue Reidy =

New Zealand author and designer

- Writing career
- Language: English, Italian
- Genres: Fiction, poetry, short stories
- Website: Official website

Sue Reidy is a New Zealand author and designer.

Reidy has a professional background in graphic design and illustration, including designing book jackets. She has taught at the Auckland University of Technology and been a judge in the PANZ Book Design Awards.

Published fiction by Reidy includes:

- Modettes and Other Stories (1988, Penguin Books NZ), short story collection
- The Visitation (1996, Scribner), novel
- Four Ways to Become a Woman (2000, Transworld), novel
- L'Amore Secondo Miranda (2010, Newton Compton Editori), novel

Reidy's work has been published in a number of literary journals and anthologies, including: New Zealand Listener, Metro, Landfall, Sunday Star Times, Australian Women’s Weekly, Penguin 25 New Fiction (Penguin, 1998), Penguin Book of Contemporary Short Stories (Penguin, 1989), Wee Girls (1996, Spinifex Press), and Good-bye to Romance (1989, Allen & Unwin). Her work was commended by Paula Green in the 2007 Best New Zealand Poems collection.

Reidy is based in Auckland, New Zealand.

== Awards ==
Reidy won the 1987 Bank of New Zealand Katherine Mansfield Memorial Award. In 1995 she was the runner-up for the Sunday Star-Times Short Story Award.

The Visitation was shortlisted in fiction section of the 1997 Montana New Zealand Book Awards.

In 2000 she was awarded the Buddle Finlay Sargeson Writers Fellowship, with James Brown and Charlotte Grimshaw.

In 2015, her manuscript Small Steps to Happiness was shortlisted in the Ashton Wylie Book and Manuscript Awards.
