= Airini Beautrais =

New Zealand poet and short-story writer (born 1982)

Dr Airini Beautrais
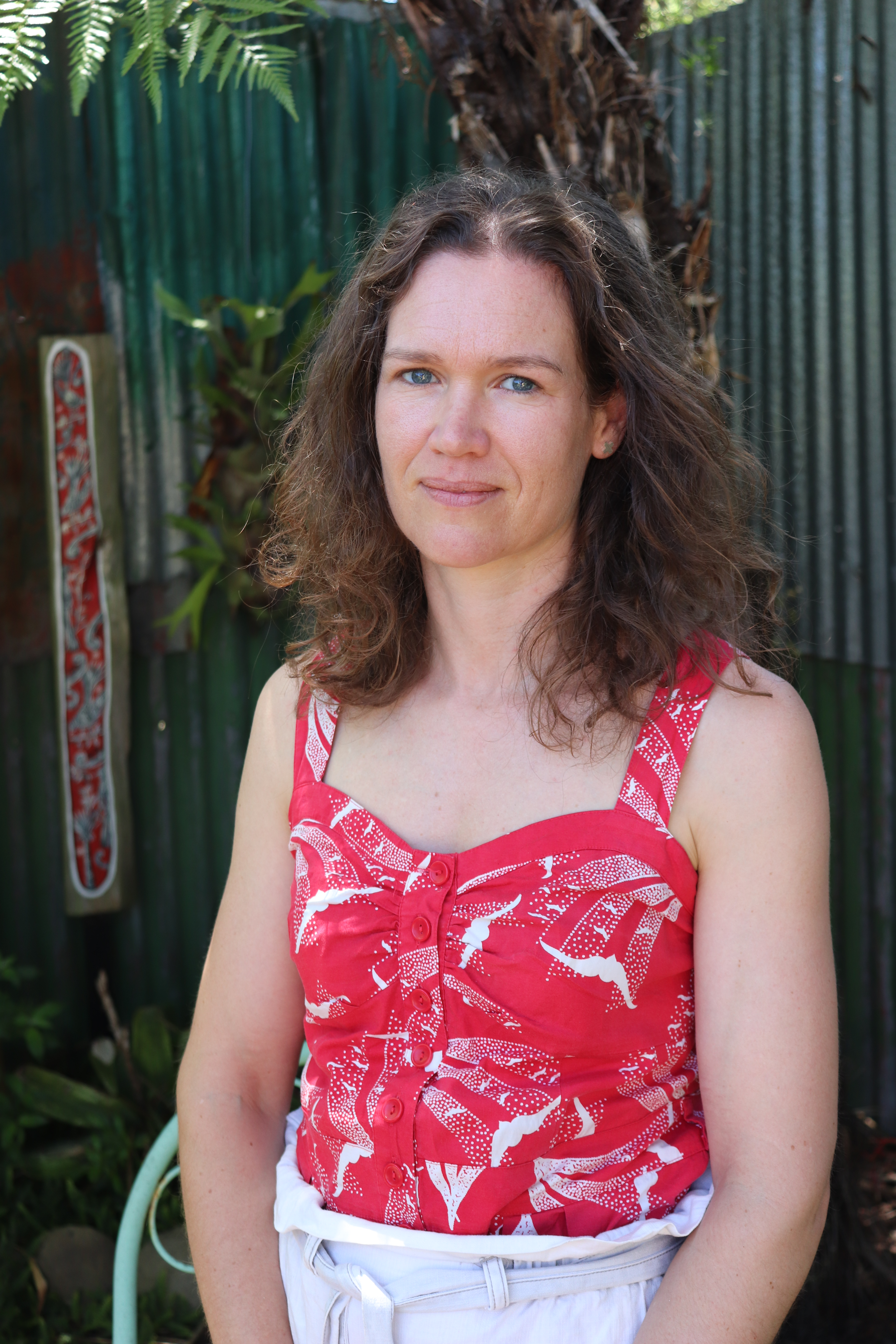
- Airini Beautrais in 2021
- Born: 1982 (age 43–44); New Zealand
- Education: Victoria University of Wellington
- Writing career
- Language: English
- Notable works: Secret Heart; Bug Week & Other Stories
- Notable awards: NZSA Jessie Mackay Best First Book of Poetry; Jann Medlicott Acorn Prize for Fiction

Airini Jane Beautrais (born 1982) is a poet and short-story writer from New Zealand.

== Background ==
Beautrais was born in 1982 and grew up in Auckland and Whanganui. She studied creative writing and ecological science at the Victoria University of Wellington. In 2016 she received her PhD in Creative Writing from the International Institute of Modern Letters, under doctoral advisors Harry Ricketts and James Brown.

As of 2021, Beautrais lives in Whanganui with her two sons.

== Works ==
Beautrais's writing draws on her personal experiences, and is often set in her hometown of Whanganui.

Beautrais has published four collections of poetry with Victoria University Press: Secret Heart (2006); Western Line (2011); Dear Neil Roberts (VUP, 2014); and Flow: Whanganui River Poems (2017). In 2020 Victoria University Press published a collection of her short stories, titled Bug Week & Other Stories. The collection had taken her ten years to write, and she has said it was inspired by "the female experience, from girlhood through to middle age and end of life".

She has been published in the Best New Zealand Poems series (2016) and literary journals, including Overland, and Penduline.

== Awards ==
Beautrais's first collection of poetry, Secret Heart, was awarded the NZSA Jessie Mackay Best First Book of Poetry at the 2007 Montana New Zealand Book Awards.

Dear Neil Roberts was longlisted in the poetry category of the 2016 Ockham New Zealand Book Award.

In 2016 she was shortlisted for the Sarah Broom Poetry Prize.

Beautrais won the 2016 Landfall Essay Competition.

She won the Jann Medlicott Acorn Prize for Fiction at the 2021 Ockham New Zealand Book Awards for Bug Week & Other Stories, receiving an award of NZ$57,000, New Zealand's largest cash book prize. Kiran Dass, the category's convener of judges, said of the book: "Casting a devastating and witty eye on humanity at its most fallible and wonky, this is a tightly-wound and remarkably assured collection". It was only the second short-story collection to win the top fiction prize in the history of the New Zealand Book Awards.
