= Frankie McMillan =

New Zealand writer

- Born: 1950 (age 75–76); Christchurch
- Occupation: Writer

Frankie McMillan is a writer of poetry, fiction and flash fiction. She lives in Christchurch, New Zealand.

== Biography ==
Frankie McMillan was born in Christchurch in 1950. She studied education and sociology at the University of Canterbury. In the 1970s, she lived off the land with her young family up the Parapara Valley in Golden Bay, originally in an old shack with no electricity, a wood range and solar panels, and then in a replacement house on the same land.

In 1999 she studied for a MA in creative writing at the International Institute of Modern Letters at Victoria University of Wellington and later studied theatre at Sydney University.

Her first collection of poetry, Dressing for the Cannibals, was launched in August 2009 as part of the 150th anniversary celebrations for Christchurch City Library. Her work has been published in Best New Zealand Poems as well as on online poetry blogs and in journals including Turbine, Snorkel, JAAM, Trout, takahē, Sweet Mammalian and Cincinnati Review (US). It has also appeared in Poems in the Waiting Room and in anthologies such as The Unbelievable Lightness of Eggs (Hallard, 2006), Essential NZ Short Stories (Vintage, 2009) and Best New Zealand Fiction Anthologies (Vintage 2008 and 2009).

In 2016, following the publication of My Mother and the Hungarians and other small fictions, she was invited to Hungary as the guest of the Hungarian Embassy in Wellington, to attend a commemorative event of the 60th anniversary of the Hungarian Revolution of 1956.

She lives in Christchurch and teaches creative writing at the Hagley Writers’ Institute.

== Awards and Prizes ==
Frankie McMillan was awarded the Creative New Zealand Todd New Writers' Bursary in 2005.

She won the 2009 New Zealand Poetry International Competition and the 2013 and 2015 New Zealand Flash Fiction Competition.

In 2014, she was the recipient of the Ursula Bethell Residency in Creative Writing at the University of Canterbury.

She received the University of Auckland residency at the Michael King Writers Centre in 2017, and the NZSA Peter & Dianne Beatson Fellowship in 2019.

My Mother and the Hungarians and other small fictions (Canterbury University Press, 2016) was longlisted for the 2017 Ockham New Zealand Book Awards. The Father of Octopus Wrestling and other small fictions (Canterbury University Press, 2019) was named as one of the ten best New Zealand fiction books of 2019 by The Spinoff.

== Bibliography ==
Poetry

- Dressing for the Cannibals (Sudden Valley Press, 2009)
- There are No Horses in Heaven (Canterbury University Press, 2015)

Short fiction

- The Bag Lady’s Picnic and Other Stories (Shoal Bay Press, 2001)
- My Mother and the Hungarians and other small fictions (Canterbury University Press, 2016)
- The Father of Octopus Wrestling and other small fictions (Canterbury University Press, 2019)
- The Wandering Nature of Us Girls (Canterbury University Press, 2022)

As co-editor

- Bonsai: best small stories from Aotearoa New Zealand (Canterbury University Press, 2018)

== See also ==
- List of New Zealand poets
