= Lynn Davidson =

New Zealand writer (born 1959)

- Born: 1959 (age 66–67); Wellington, New Zealand
- Education: Massey University (PhD)
- Occupations: Poet; novelist

Academic background
- Thesis: Repetition as revision : explored through the revision of place in Jackie Kay's Fiere, Kathleen Jamie's The Tree House and Crane, a creative composition by Lynn Davidson (2015)

Lynn Davidson (born 1959) is a New Zealand poet and novelist.

== Life and career ==
Davidson was born in Wellington in 1959. She graduated from Victoria University of Wellington where she undertook Bill Manhire's creative writing course. In 2015 she completed her PhD in creative writing at Massey University.

Davidson's 2019 poetry collection, Islander, was reviewed in Landfall. The review described Davidson as being one of the "quiet, unsung achievers in New Zealand writing", and the collection as "assured, graceful and calmly astringent". One of the poems in the collection, "The thing on my wall", was published in the 2019 edition of Best New Zealand Poems.

She received the Randell Cottage Writers Residency in 2021, and used the time to work on her memoir, Do You Still Have Time For Chaos? (published in 2024), about her decision in 2016 to relocate to Edinburgh. Sally Blundell, reviewing the work in the Aotearoa New Zealand Review of Books, described it as "a discursive exploration of belonging and not belonging, of the pull of home and the play of history".

== Selected works ==
=== Poetry collections ===
- Mary Shelly's Window (1999)
- Tender (Steele Roberts, 2006)
- How to Live by the Sea (Victoria University Press, 2009)
- Common Land (Victoria University Press, 2009)
- Islander (Victoria University Press, 2019; Shearsman Books, 2019)

=== Other works ===
- Ghost Net (2003, novel)
- The Desert Road (Rosa Mira Books, 2014, novella)
- Do You Still Have Time For Chaos? (Te Herenga Waka University Press, 2024, autobiography)
