= Ruby Solly =

New Zealand poet and musician

Dr Ruby Solly
- Born: Ruby Mae Hinepunui Solly; 1996 (age 29–30)
- Occupations: Poet; taonga pūoro practitioner; cellist; composer; music therapist; scriptwriter
- Notable work: Pōneke (2020 album); Tōku Papa (2021 poetry collection); "The Artist" (2023 poetry novel)

Academic background
- Education: Victoria University of Wellington (masters student)
- Thesis: How can I as a Māori music therapy student develop the use of taonga puoro in my practice to support client recovery in an inpatient mental health setting? (2019)

Academic background
- Education: Massey University (doctoral student)
- Thesis: He Hauora! He Hauoro! : the use of taonga pūoro in hauora Māori (2023)

Dr Ruby Mae Hinepunui Solly (born 1996) is a New Zealand poet, taonga pūoro practitioner, cellist, composer, music therapist and scriptwriter. In 2023 she completed a doctoral thesis on the use of taonga puoro in mental health settings.

== Life and career ==
=== Background and education ===
Solly has Māori, Pākehā and Jewish heritage. She is part of the iwi (tribes) of Kāi Tahu, Kāti Māmoe and Waitaha. She was born near Mount Ruapehu, grew up around Tūrangi, Taupō, and Rotorua, and at age 17 moved to Wellington. She identifies as takatāpui (queer).

Solly grew up in a musical family. Her mother is a ukulele teacher, and her stepfather was part of the Hamilton County Bluegrass Band. She learned to play the kōauau at primary school. At age eight she began to play the cello, and she has written about experiencing racism as she trained to be a classical musician. At age 14 she performed with the Wellington International Ukulele Orchestra.

Solly holds a Bachelor's degree of Music (in Jazz Performance) and a Master's degree in Musical Therapy. Solly also has a PhD in public health from Massey University, titled "He Hauora! He Hauoro! : the use of taonga pūoro in hauora Māori", a thesis focusing on the use of taonga pūoro (traditional Māori musical instruments) in therapeutic mental health settings.

=== Poetry ===
Tōku Papa, Solly's first poetry collection, was published in 2021. It was long-listed for the Mary and Peter Biggs Award for Poetry at the 2022 Ockham New Zealand Book Awards. It focuses on her relationship with her father and whakapapa. Reviewer Jessie Neilson for Takahē described the work as demonstrating "an inner strength, and ... a deep respect for the land and its people, and all that both can offer for future generations".

Her second poetry collection, The Artist, was published in 2023. A review by Robert Sullivan said that for "readers with an interest in innovative poetry – in New Zealand literature, Indigenous literature, Māori literature – this book is significant and needed".

Solly's work has been published in various literary magazines including Starling, Landfall, Sport and others, and anthologised in Best New Zealand Poems (2019), Aotearoa Poetry Yearbook 2021, Out Here: an anthology of Takatāpui and LGBTQIA+ writers from Aotearoa (Auckland University Press, 2021) and A Kind of Shelter (Massey University Press, 2023). In 2019 she was a runner-up for the Caselberg Trust International Poetry Prize.

=== Music and other work ===
As a taonga pūoro performer and cellist, Solly has performed with artists such as Yo-yo Ma, Whirimako Black and Trinity Roots, and with the Auckland Philharmonia Orchestra. Her debut album Pōneke was released in 2020. She has composed pieces for short films and for the Goethe Institute with Wellington Film Society.

Solly is a member of the Tararua musical quartet together with Ariana Tikao, Al Fraser and Phil Boniface. Their album Bird Like Men was released in 2021. Solly composed the work Te Karanga o ngā Whētu (the stories of the stars) for the group, which premiered at the Wellington Jazz Festival in 2021. She is also part of the Maianginui taonga pūoro ensemble of women, together with Tikao, Te Kahureremoa Taumata and Khali-Meari Materoa. Her composition Ātahu was performed by Maianginui and the Auckland Philharmonia Orchestra at the 2023 Auckland Arts Festival.

Solly co-wrote the short film Super Special (2019) with Ashley Williams, which has aired on Whakaata Māori, at the Māoriland Film Festival in 2020 and at the Los Angeles Women in Film Festival.

In 2024, Solly held an exhibition of 248 pūtangitangi that she created from clay harvested from the earth, called (Pū)oro. Solly was interviewed about the exhibition by Radio New Zealand. A soundtrack was also released alongside the exhibition that is available on Bandcamp.
