= Kay McKenzie Cooke =

New Zealand poet

- Born: 1953 (age 72–73); Tuatapere, New Zealand
- Writing career
- Genre: Poetry
- Notable work: Feeding the Dogs
- Notable awards: NZSA Jessie Mackay Best First Book Award for Poetry (2003)

Kay McKenzie Cooke (born 1953) is a New Zealand poet. In 2003, her collection, Feeding the Dogs, won the NZSA Jessie Mackay Best First Book Award for Poetry at the New Zealand Book Awards.

== Background ==
Cooke was born in 1953 in Tuatapere. She grew up in Orepuki. She is of Kāi Tahu, Kāti Māmoe, English, Scottish, and Irish descent. She studied at Dunedin Teachers' College and worked in the early childhood education sector. Cooke currently lives in Dunedin.

== Career ==
Cooke has been published in the 2020 and 2014 Best New Zealand Poems series and her work was praised in the 2007 edition. She was included in The Second New Zealand Haiku Anthology and Cordite Poetry Review. Her work has also appeared in a number of literary journals and magazines including: Takahe, "Landfall", New Zealand Listener, Sport, JAAM, Southern Ocean Review, Trout, Glottis, and Poetry New Zealand.

Regarding Cooke's collection Born to a Red-Headed Woman, The Southland Times reviewer Jillian Allison-Aitken called it "autobiographical and raw, taking the reader on a journey through the poet's life, from carefree child to angry teen to balanced grandmother and more".

Cooke was awarded the 2006 Dan Davin Foundation Award for her short story, "Where The Trees Lean Sideways".

Cooke has collaborated with fellow poet Jenny Powell to create 'J&K On The Road Again', a project to discover and promote poetry in the rural areas of New Zealand.

== Works ==
Cooke has published four collections of poems:

- Feeding the Dogs (2002, Otago University Press)
- Made for Weather: Poems by Kay McKenzie Cooke (2007, Otago University Press)
- Born to a Red-Headed Woman (2014, Otago University Press)
- Upturned (2020, The Cuba Press)

Cooke has published three novels:

- Craggan Dhu (Time Will Tell) (Amazon Digital Services LLC – KDP Print USA), ISBN 9798630145512
- Quick Blue Fire (Amazon Digital Services LLC – KDP Print USA), ISBN 979-8357633552
- I, Said The Lark (Amazon Digital Services LLC – KDP Print USA), ISBN 9798875803550
