= Simone Kaho =

New Zealand poet

- Born: 1978 (age 46–47); Auckland, New Zealand
- Education: Victoria University of Wellington
- Genre: Performance poetry

Simone Kaho (born 1978) is a New Zealand poet of Tongan descent.

== Biography ==
She was born in Auckland and received an MA in creative writing from the International Institute of Modern Letters at Victoria University of Wellington.

Her poetry has appeared in various journals including JAAM (Just Another Art Movement), Turbine and The Dominion Post. A performance poet, she has appeared in shows such as The Kerouac Effect and Poetry Live. In 2016, she published a collection of poetry Lucky Punch. The New Zealand Book Council included Lucky Punch on their list of "21 new Kiwi books we can’t wait to read". Her second collection, Heal!, explores the PTSD she developed after an assault and was published in 2022.

Kaho was included in the 20/20 Collection published by the New Zealand Book Awards Trust, her work having been selected by poet Paula Green. In 2022, she was chosen by Creative New Zealand as the 2022 Emerging Pasifika Writer in Residence at Victoria University of Wellington, which she used to write non-fiction about identity, the colonisation of New Zealand, and the Pacific diaspora. In 2025 she was the recipient of the Fulbright New Zealand and Creative New Zealand Pacific Writer’s Residency at the University of Hawai'i.
