= John Newton (poet) =

New Zealand poet

- Born: 1959 (age 66–67); Blenheim, New Zealand
- Education: University of Canterbury; University of Melbourne
- Occupations: Poet; literary critic; novelist; musician
- Writing career
- Period: 1985–present

John Newton (born 1959) is a New Zealand poet, novelist, literary critic and musician. His poetry appears in several major New Zealand anthologies, he has written books about literary history and art, and his first novel was published in October 2020. He was the 2020 Robert Burns Fellow at the University of Otago.

== Early life and academic work ==
Newton was born in Blenheim, New Zealand, in 1959. He grew up on a sheep farm at Port Underwood in the Marlborough Sounds, and started writing poetry in his early teens after being encouraged by a schoolteacher. In 1978 he attended Victoria University of Wellington for several months but quit to concentrate on his poetry.

Newton later returned to higher education and completed a Masters of Arts degree on contemporary New Zealand poetry at the University of Canterbury in 1987. He was awarded the Macmillan Brown Prize for student writing three times. From 1993 to 1994 he taught at the University of Melbourne while completing his Ph.D thesis on Sylvia Plath. From 1995 to 2009 he lectured in English at the University of Canterbury. In 1999 he received the Vice Chancellor's Award for Excellence and Innovation in Teaching.

== Poetry ==
In 1985, Newton's first collection of poetry, Tales from the Angler's Eldorado, was published, while he was an undergraduate at the University of Canterbury. The Oxford Companion to New Zealand Literature described the title, taken from a 1926 description of New Zealand by American author Zane Grey, as being "in ironic counterpoint to the poetry's unflinchingly realistic world of rural violence". Reviewer Iain Sharp, writing in Landfall, found "a welcome freshness in Newton's perceptions", noting: "In a nation which has been defined so often as a rural economy, it's surprising that Newton's hardbitten rustic verse has so few antecedents." Although he was critical of Newton's use of formulaic or self-conscious imagery, he concluded: "Newton has a sureness of tone, a lucidity of expression and an intimacy with his subject matter which are remarkable in so young a writer. Already it makes sense to speak of his work in terms of achievement rather than promise." The long poem Night Fishing was reprinted in The Penguin Book of Contemporary New Zealand Poetry (1989).

Newton's second poetry collection, Lives of the Poets, was published in 2010, 25 years after his first. He explained on the book's blurb that since his first volume: "I have been trying to teach myself how to write again. This has felt mostly like a kind of beachcombing, ... never entirely giving up hope of discovering something that might still be usable." Iain Sharp, reviewing the collection, noted the inclusion of the poem "Opening the Book", calling it a "much-anthologised meditation on the blurring of real and imagined versions of the New Zealand landscape, already regarded as a minor classic". Hamesh Wyatt in the Otago Daily Times described Newton's poetry as "beautiful in places, grand and joyous in others".

Newton's third poetry collection, Family Songbook, was published in 2013. It was illustrated by Toss Woollaston, one of New Zealand's most well-known painters. David Eggleton, writing in the New Zealand Listener, described the collection as presenting "a metropolitan's love-hate relationship with the provincial backblocks where he grew up, on the farm", and praised the way Newton "craftily renders a high Modernist tranche of theatre country, saturated in art and literature, layer upon layer like a rich trifle".

Newton's first novel, Escape Path Lighting, was published in October 2020. It is a verse novel, and Newton has described it as "a comedy with many targets, not least the ways we try to teach creative writing".

== Non-fiction writing and other literary work ==
After leaving the University of Canterbury in 2009, Newton became a full-time writer and has held a number of writing residencies. He was appointed the 2010 JD Stout Fellow at Victoria University, he was the 2014 Writer in Residence at the University of Waikato, and he was one of two Ursula Bethell Writers in Residence at the University of Canterbury in 2017.

In 2009, Newton's book The Double Rainbow: James K. Baxter, Ngāti Hau and the Jerusalem Commune was published by Victoria University Press. The book is a history of New Zealand poet James K. Baxter and his time spent establishing a commune at Jerusalem, New Zealand in the late 1960s and early 1970s. As part of his research for the book, Newton interviewed former members of the commune and other local residents. Writing in the Waikato Times, reviewer Peter Dornauf said: "Double Rainbow is a scholarly, readable and fascinating account of events at the tipping point in our cultural history."

In 2017, Newton published the first of a planned trilogy about 20th century New Zealand literature, entitled Hard Frost: Structures of Feeling in New Zealand Literature 1908–1945. Hugh Roberts, writing in the New Zealand Review of Books, praised the book as "wise, human, witty and compassionate", and said: "If there is a better book on New Zealand literature ... I have not read it".

In early 2019, Newton was the first reviewer of a collection of letters by James K. Baxter, edited by Baxter's friend John Weir. Writing in New Zealand online magazine The Spinoff, Newton observed that as a result of the publication of these letters "it's no longer possible to talk about [Baxter] without addressing the ways that he thinks and writes about women". He highlighted Baxter's letters to other female poets, and that they "also provide a distressing insight" into Baxter's marriage to Jacquie Sturm. The letters' "most appalling disclosure" was the confession to a friend in 1960 that Baxter had raped Sturm. Newton wrote that "it won't be a surprise if, for many potential readers, this statement comes to drown out everything else that Baxter wrote". After the review, Newton was asked by another journalist why he left the subject of Baxter's relationships with members of the commune at Jerusalem out of his 2009 book Double Rainbow; Newton explained that during his preparatory research it was clear that people did not want to cause Sturm embarrassment, and further that he felt that these issues would drown out "the bicultural dimension, the collaboration between the pā and the hippies".

In 2019, Newton received the Robert Burns Fellowship, one of New Zealand's most prestigious literary awards. The award provided him with an office in the English department at the University of Otago during 2020. He said he intended to use the time to write the second instalment of his New Zealand literature trilogy, following on from Hard Frost, which will cover the 1946 to 1968 period. A final instalment is planned to cover the 1970s and 1980s. The first few months of Newton's fellowship were spent in lockdown due to the COVID-19 pandemic.

In August 2020, Newton's book about the life and works of sculptor Llew Summers, Llew Summers: Body and Soul, was published. Newton had decided to write the book after living and working in a cottage in Christchurch that had been loaned to him by Summers: "I thought it would repay some of the kindness he showed me." When Summers became ill, he talked to Newton about his artistic works and the two became close friends. Summers died in August 2019.

== Music ==
Newton is a musician and songwriter, and a seasoned performer. He has said music for him is a collaborative process and tends to take a backseat to his writing. In 2011 he released an album, Love Me Tender, with his alt-country band The Tenderizers. Reviewer Tim Gruar described the songs as "gorgeously layered back-country narratives with compelling lyrics and harmonies that creep slowly into the subconscious", while writer Jack Ross praised the "beautiful and polished lyrics". He has also performed with bands The Overdogs and The Adulterators.

== Selected works ==
=== Poetry collections ===
- Tales from the Angler's Eldorado (1985)
- Lives of the Poets (2010)
- Family Songbook (2013)

=== Non-fiction ===
- The Double Rainbow: James K. Baxter, Ngāti Hau and the Jerusalem Commune (2009)
- Hard Frost: Structures of Feeling in New Zealand Literature 1908–1945 (2017)
- Llew Summers: Body and Soul (2020)

=== Novels ===
- Escape Path Lighting (2020)
