= Louise Wallace (writer) =

New Zealand poet

- Born: Louise Mary Wallace; 1983 (age 42–43); Gisborne, New Zealand
- Education: Victoria University of Wellington
- Writing career
- Language: English
- Genres: Poetry, Fiction
- Notable awards: Biggs Family Prize in Poetry

Louise Mary Wallace (born 1983) is a New Zealand poet.

== Background ==
Wallace was born in Gisborne in 1983. She received a BA from Victoria University of Wellington in 2004 and an MA in creative writing at the International Institute of Modern Letters (Victoria University of Wellington) in 2008. She lives in Dunedin with her husband and son.

== Works ==
Wallace's writing explores family stories and relationships, travel, and music.

Her poems have appeared in many literary journals, including Akzente, Landfall, Meanjin, Snorkel, Sport, and Turbine. Her work has also been published in the Best New Zealand Poems series (2009, 2011 and 2017) and Essential New Zealand Poems: Facing the Empty Page (2014).

Collected works of poems by Wallace include:

- Since June (Victoria University Press, 2009)
- Enough (Victoria University Press, 2013)
- Bad Things (Victoria University Press, 2017)
- This is a Story About Your Mother (Te Herenga Waka University Press, 2023)

Wallace's first novel, Ash, was published by Te Herenga Waka University Press in 2024. The novel was acquired by Allen & Unwin and published in Australia in 2025. HarperCollins will published Ash in the United States in May 2026.

Wallace is the founder and editor of Starling, a literary journal showcasing young New Zealand writers.

Wallace has taught creative writing at Massey University and the Nelson Marlborough Institute of Technology.

== Awards ==
In 2015, Wallace received the Robert Burns Fellowship, a literary residency with the University of Otago in Dunedin, New Zealand. While at Victoria University of Wellington, she was awarded the Biggs Prize for Poetry.

In 2025, Ash was longlisted for the Jann Medlicott Acorn Prize for Fiction at the Ockham New Zealand Book Awards.
