= Anna Smaill =

New Zealand poet and novelist

- Born: Anna Smaill; April 1979 (age 47); Auckland, New Zealand
- Education: University of Auckland; Victoria University of Wellington; University College London
- Occupations: Poet, Writer, Violinist
- Spouse: Carl Shuker
- Children: 1
- Writing career
- Subject: Poetry
- Notable awards: World Fantasy Award for Best Novel 2016.
- Website: www.annasmaill.com

Anna Smaill (born April 1979) is a New Zealand poet and novelist, and a former violinist.

== Early life and education ==
Smaill was born in Auckland in 1979. She started playing the violin aged seven. She studied musical performance at the University of Canterbury in the late 1990s and during her time at Canterbury, she decided to not become a professional violinist, but pursue a career in writing instead. She began studying English and music theory, before changing to the University of Auckland, from where she graduated with a master's degree in English. She spent the following year in Wellington at Victoria University of Wellington, graduating with a masters in creative writing from the International Institute of Modern Letters. She lived in Tokyo, Japan, from 2004 to 2006. Smaill started a PhD in contemporary American poetry at University College London in the United Kingdom, and finished it after returning to live in Wellington in 2013. She was a lecturer in creative writing at the University of Hertfordshire from 2009 to 2012.

== Writing ==
Smaill was included in the Best New Zealand Poems series in 2002 and 2005. Her first collection of poetry, The Violinist in Spring, was published in 2006. Her first novel, The Chimes, was published in 2015 and was longlisted for the 2015 Man Booker Prize, but did not make the shortlist. She had been unaware that her publisher had submitted The Chimes for the award. The Chimes was awarded the World Fantasy Award for Best Novel in October 2016.

Smaill writes her work in longhand before typing it up.

In 2023 Smaill's second novel, Bird Life, was published by Te Herenga Waka University Press. Bird Life was longlisted for the Jann Medlicott Acorn Prize for Fiction in 2024.

== Family ==
Smaill met the novelist Carl Shuker while studying at Victoria University. They married in 2010 and have one daughter.
