= Rhian Gallagher =

New Zealand poet (born 1961)

- Born: 1961 (age 64–65); Timaru, New Zealand
- Writing career
- Genre: Poetry
- Notable work: Shift
- Notable awards: New Zealand Post Book Award for Poetry (2011), Janet Frame Literary Trust Award (2008)

Rhian Gallagher (born 1961) is a poet from New Zealand.

== Background ==
Gallagher was born in 1961 in Timaru, New Zealand. She currently lives in Dunedin.

== Career ==
Between 1995 and 2005, Gallagher worked in publishing in London before returning to New Zealand. Her first poetry collection, Salt Water Creek, was published in 2003. In 2012, she published her second collection, Shift.

Poetry by Gallagher has been published in a number of literary journals and anthologies including Best New Zealand Poems, 121 New Zealand Poems, The Nature of Things: Poems from the New Zealand Landscape, and The Best of the Best New Zealand Poems.

In 2010 the South Canterbury Museum published her non-fiction biography of mountaineer Jack Adamson entitled Feeling for Daylight: The Photographs of Jack Adamson.

Gallagher collaborated with artist Lynn Taylor and printer Sarah Smith to create the artist book Freda Du Faur, Southern Alps 1909-1913, celebrating the life and achievements of Freda Du Faur, the first woman to climb Aoraki/Mount Cook.

== Awards ==
Salt Water Creek was shortlisted for the 2003 Forward Prize for First Collection.

The Canterbury History Foundation awarded Gallagher the 2007 Canterbury Community Historian Award which supported the publication of Feeling for Daylight: The Photographs of Jack Adamson.

In 2008 she was awarded the Janet Frame Award for Poetry. Her poem 'Embrace' placed third in the Poetry Society's National Poetry Competition.

In the 2012 New Zealand Post Book Awards, Shift won New Zealand Post Book Award for Poetry. The collection was included in the New Zealand Listener's Best Books of 2011.

Gallagher held the 2018 University of Otago Robert Burns Fellowship.

== Works ==
=== Poetry ===
- Salt Water Creek (Enitharmon Press, 2003)
- Shift (Auckland University Press, 2011; Enitharmon Press, 2012)
- Freda Du Faur, Southern Alps 1909-1913 (Otakou Press, 2016)
- Far-Flung (Auckland University Press, 2020)

=== Non-Fiction ===
- Feeling for Daylight: The Photographs of Jack Adamson (South Canterbury Museum, 2010)
