= Anna Jackson =

New Zealand writer (b. 1967)

Anna Jackson (born 1967) is a New Zealand poet, fiction and non-fiction writer and an academic.

== Biography ==
Jackson grew up in Auckland and now lives in Wellington. She has an MA from the University of Auckland and a DPhil from Oxford University. She is currently an associate professor in the School of English, Film, Theatre and Media Studies at Victoria University of Wellington.

Her poems were first published in the collection AUP New Poets 1 (AUP, 1999) and she has since published a number of collections of poetry, as well as writing and co-editing works of literary criticism, essays, short stories and book reviews for publications in New Zealand and overseas. Much of her poetry explores the ideas of family and childhood. Her writing has appeared in journals and anthologies, and she has published several collections of poetry. The Gas Leak was reviewed in the Journal of New Zealand Literature.

Pasture and Flock: New and Selected Poems, published by Auckland University Press, was reviewed on Radio New Zealand's Nine to Noon programme on 3 April 2018.

Thicket by Anna Jackson was reviewed in the Listener magazine, and in takahē magazine. I, Clodia, and Other Portraits was reviewed by Cordite Poetry Review, and Landfall.

== Awards and honours ==
She has received a number of awards for her work, including a 1999 Louis Johnson New Writers’ Bursary, the 2001 Waikato University Writer in Residence, the Katherine Mansfield Menton Fellowship in 2015, and a 2017 residency at the Michael King Writers Centre. In 2018 she was a winner of Viva la Novella VI with The Bed-making Competition.

== Publications ==
Her work includes the following:

Poetry

- Terrier, Worrier: A Poem in Five Parts (Auckland UP, 2025)
- Pasture and Flock: New and Selected Poems (Auckland UP, 2018)
- I, Clodia (Auckland UP, 2014)
- Thicket (Auckland UP, 2011)
- The Gas Leak (Auckland UP, 2006)
- Catullus for Children (Auckland UP, 2003)
- The Pastoral Kitchen (Auckland UP, 2001)
- The Long Road to Teatime (Auckland UP, 2000)

Editor

- Truth and Beauty: Verse Biography in Canada, Australia and New Zealand (co-edited with Angelina Sbroma & Helen Rickerby: Victoria UP, 2016)
- Verse Biography (special issue of the journal Biography: Hawai’i UP, 2016)
- Floating Worlds: Essays on Contemporary New Zealand Fiction (co-edited with Jane Stafford: Victoria UP, 2009)
- The Gothic in Children’s Literature: Haunting the Borders (co-edited with Karen Coats & Rod McGillis: Routledge, 2007)

=== Fiction ===
- The Bed-making Competition (2018)
