= Kate Camp =

New Zealand poet

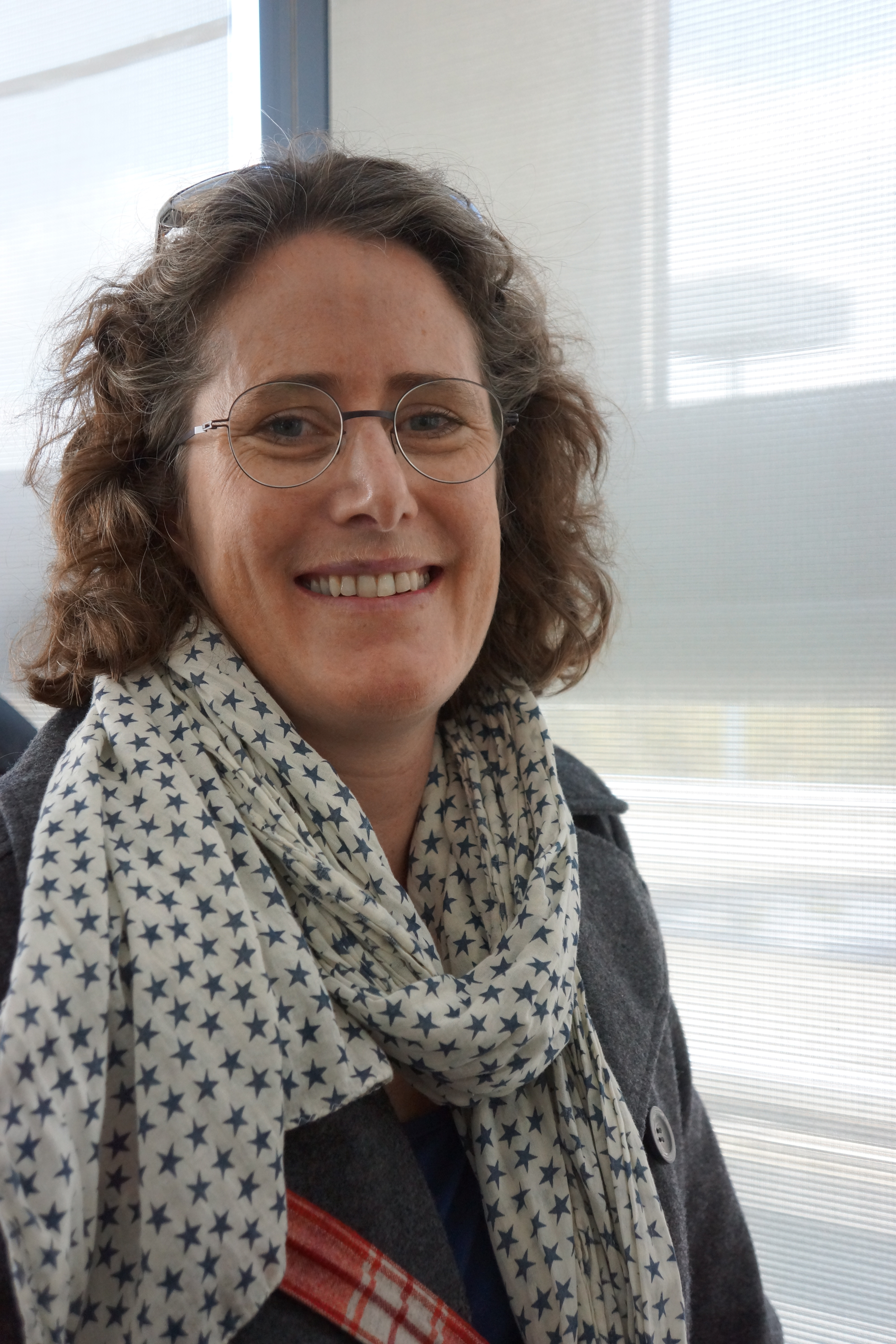
- Camp in 2012
- Born: 1972 (age 53–54); Wellington, New Zealand
- Education: Victoria University of Wellington
- Writing career
- Language: English
- Genre: Poetry
- Notable work: Unfamiliar Legends of the Stars
- Notable awards: NZSA Jessie Mackay Award for Best First Book of Poetry

Kate Camp (born 1972) is a New Zealand poet and author who resides in Wellington.

== Early life and education ==
Camp was born in 1972 in Wellington, New Zealand. She attended Onslow College. She has a BA in English from the Victoria University of Wellington.

== Career ==
Poems by Camp have appeared in the Best New Zealand Poems series in 2001, 2002, 2003, 2010, 2012, and 2013. She has also been published in numerous literary magazines, including Landfall, New Zealand Books, New Zealand Listener, Sport, Takahe, Brick (Canada), Akzente (Germany) and Qualm (England).

Camp hosted a monthly radio segment, 'Kate's Klassics' on Kim Hill's radio show Saturday Morning on Radio New Zealand National. Camp worked at the Museum of New Zealand Te Papa Tongarewa as the head of marketing and communications from 2015 to 2026. In June 2026 she was appointed Principal Advisor Public Affairs at the New Zealand Reserve Bank.

== Awards ==
At the 1999 Montana New Zealand Book Awards Camp's collection, Unfamiliar Legends of the Stars, won the NZSA Jessie Mackay Award for Best First Book of Poetry.

In 2011, The Mirror of Simple Annihilated Souls won the award for poetry at the New Zealand Post Book Awards and was shortlisted for the Kathleen Grattan Poetry Award. In 2013, Snow White’s Coffin was a finalist in the Poetry category of the New Zealand Post Book Awards.

In 2006 and 2004 she was shortlisted for the Glenn Schaeffer Prize in Modern Letters.

=== Residencies and fellowships ===
Camp was a Writer in Residence at Waikato University in 2002. At the conclusion of the residency, her collection On Kissing was published by Four Winds Press.

In 2011 she received the Creative New Zealand Berlin Writers’ Residency and in 2016 she received the prestigious Katherine Mansfield Menton Fellowship.

== Selected works ==
Camp has published several collections of poems including:

- Unfamiliar Legends of the Stars (1998, Victoria University Press)
- Realia (2001, Victoria University Press)
- Beauty Sleep (2005, Victoria University Press)
- The Mirror of Simple Annihilated Souls (2010, Victoria University Press)
- Snow White’s Coffin (2013, Victoria University Press)
- The Internet of Things (2017, Victoria University Press)
- How to Be Happy Though Human: New and Selected Poems (2020, Victoria University Press)
- Makeshift Seasons (2025, Te Herenga Waka University Press)

In 2002 she published the collection of essays On Kissing.

In 2022 she published the memoir You Probably Think This Song Is About You (Te Herenga Waka University Press). Newsroom made it its book of the week.

In 2026 she published her 1986 diary, written when she was a teenager. Leather & Chains: My 1986 Diary (Te Herenga Waka University Press)
