= Andrew Johnston (poet) =

New Zealand poet

Andrew Johnston (born 1963) is a New Zealand poet and journalist who lives in Paris.

He is associated with the "Wellington school" of poets, which prominently includes Bill Manhire and Jenny Bornholdt, and his verse has been published in "London Review of Books" and "The Times Literary Supplement" in the United Kingdom; and in "Sport" as well as other publications in New Zealand.

== Life and career ==
Born in Upper Hutt, he received his secondary school education at St Patrick's College, Silverstream. He obtained a bachelor's degree in English literature from the University of Otago and a master's degree in English literature from the University of Auckland. In 1995 he represented New Zealand at the University of Iowa's International Writing Program.

Johnston edited the books page of (the now-defunct) The Evening Post from 1991 to 1996. In 1997 he moved to London and started working as a "casual sub-editor on the broadsheets", but after eight months moved to Normandy to teach English. When the job fell through, he commuted once a week across the Channel to work part-time for The Observer newspaper.

His marriage in 1998 resulted in his getting the right to work in France, and he applied for and received a job as an editor at the International Herald Tribune in Paris. He moved there in 1999 with his wife, Christine. They have three children, Emile, Oscar and Louise.

In 2004 Johnston founded "The Page", a Web site that features poems and essays from elsewhere on the Internet. "I'd always wanted to find a web site that kept track of the best new writing about poetry, and couldn't find it, so I made it myself," Johnston said in a 2007 interview. He edited the site until 2009, when it was taken over by John McAuliffe.

In 2007 he was the J.D. Stout Fellow at Victoria University.

In 2010 he left the International Herald Tribune to edit the annual Education for All Global Monitoring Report, the United Nations' major global survey of education, published by UNESCO. He also edits the annual Africa Progress Report for the Africa Progress Panel, works as a freelance editor for other organizations, and leads workshops on writing and editing for international organizations.

== Awards and recognition ==
- Louis Johnson New Writers Bursary recipient, 1991
- How to Talk, 1993, won the 1994 New Zealand Book Award for Poetry and the 1994 Jessie Mackay Best First Book Award.
- "Great Aunt", a poem, selected for the online collection Best New Zealand Poems 2002
- "Les Baillessats", a poem, selected for Best New Zealand Poems 2004
- Fits and Starts, 2016, won the Poetry Award at the 2017 Ockham New Zealand Book Awards

== Works ==
Poetry:

- 2023: Selected Poems, Victoria University Press
- 2016: Fits and Starts, Victoria University Press, winner of the Poetry Award at the 2017 Ockham New Zealand Book Awards
- 2007: Sol, Victoria University Press
- 2000: Birds of Europe, Victoria University Press
- 1999: The Open Window, Arc Publications (United Kingdom)
- 1996: The Sounds, Victoria University Press
- 1993: How to Talk, winner of the 1994 New Zealand Book Award for Poetry and the 1994 Jessie Mackay Best First Book Award, Victoria University Press

== See also ==
- Best New Zealand Poems series
- New Zealand literature
