= Lynn Jenner =

New Zealand poet and essayist

Dr. Lynn Jenner
- Born: Hāwera, Taranaki
- Education: Victoria University in Wellington
- Writing career
- Language: English
- Genres: Poetry, essays
- Notable work: Dear Sweet Harry
- Notable awards: Best First Book Award for Poetry in the New Zealand Post Book Awards, NZSA Jessie Mackay Award for Best First Book of Poetry
- Website: Official website

Lynn Jenner is a poet and essayist from New Zealand.

== Background ==
Jenner was born in Hāwera, Taranaki. She worked as an educational psychologist and counsellor until 2003. She began studying writing at Whitireia Polytechnic and completed an MA in creative writing at Victoria University of Wellington. She received her PhD in 2013 from the International Institute of Modern Letters at the Victoria University of Wellington. Her advisor was Bill Manhire.

As of 2018, Jenner lives on the Kāpiti Coast.

== Works ==
Jenner published her first collection of poetry, Dear Sweet Harry, in 2010. Her second book, Lost and Gone Away, was published in 2015 and is partly a memoir, including essays, and poetry. A third book titled "PEAT" was published by Otago University Press in July 2019. This book weaves Jenner's reactions to the building of the Kapiti Expressway near her home together with her relationship with the late poet, editor, and philanthropist Charles Brasch.

Poems by Jenner have been included in the Best New Zealand Poems series in 2008, 2009, and 2010. She has also published in several literary journals including Turbine and 4th Floor. Jenner was also published in the anthology Oxford Poets 2013.

== Awards ==
Jenner's MA thesis won the 2008 Adam Foundation Prize for Creative Writing.

In 2011, Dear Sweet Harry won the NZSA Jessie Mackay Award for Best First Book of Poetry at the New Zealand Post Book Awards.

Lost and Gone Away was named a Metro Best Books in 2015 and a finalist in the general non-fiction category of the 2016 Ockham New Zealand Book Awards.

Jenner won the 2025 Kathleen Grattan Award for her manuscript, "The Gum Trees of Kerikeri".
