= Rachel Bush =

New Zealand poet (1941–2016)

- Born: 26 December 1941; Christchurch, New Zealand
- Died: 23 March 2016 (aged 74); Nelson, New Zealand
- Occupation: Writer
- Spouse: Richard Nunns

Rachel Bush (26 December 1941 — 23 March 2016) was a New Zealand poet and teacher. Her work was widely published in books, anthologies and literary magazines.

== Biography ==
Bush was born in 1941 in Christchurch and grew up in Hāwera. She taught English at Nelson College for Girls until 2003.

She was a member of the first MA course in creative writing run by Bill Manhire at Victoria University of Wellington in 1996 and her first book of poetry, The Hungry Woman, was based on work written during that course. Her work was published in Best New Zealand Poems and in 4th Floor Literary Journal as well as on online poetry blogs and in journals including Sport, Landfall, Turbine and Faber's Introduction.

In 2004, she was poet in residence at Wellington Hospital as part of the Poets in Workplaces Scheme. The resulting poems were published as a booklet by the Wai-te-ata Press in 2006, accompanied by photographs taken in the Neonatal Unit by Alan Knowles. One of her poems, "Cicadas", was set to music by Gillian Whitehead, having been commissioned by harpist Helen Webby (with funding from Creative New Zealand).

Bush was married to musician Richard Nunns and had two daughters and five grandchildren. She died on 23 March 2016, a month before the publication of Thought Horses, although a copy of the book was ready in time for her to see it. Thought Horses was posthumously longlisted for the 2017 Ockham New Zealand Book Awards.

== Bibliography ==
- The Hungry Woman (Victoria University Press, 1997)
- The Unfortunate Singer (Victoria University Press, 2002)
- All patients report here, with photos by Alan Knowles (Wai-te-ata Press, 2006)
- Nice Pretty Things (Victoria University Press, 2011)
- Thought Horses (Victoria University Press, 2016)

== See also ==
- List of New Zealand poets
