= Dinah Hawken =

New Zealand poet

- Born: 1943 (age 82–83) Hāwera, New Zealand
- Occupation: Poet; creative writing teacher; physiotherapist; counsellor; social worker
- Education: Brooklyn College (M.F.A.)
- Notable awards: Prime Minister's Award for Literary Achievement (2025)

Dinah Hawken (born 1943) is a New Zealand poet. She has published ten collections of poetry, and in addition to her writing work has worked as a creative writing teacher, a physiotherapist, a counsellor and a social worker. In 2025 she received the Prime Minister's Award for Literary Achievement.

== Life and career ==
Hawken was born in Hāwera in 1943 and is a trained physiotherapist, psychotherapist and social worker. She worked at Victoria University of Wellington as a student counsellor for two decades, and has taught creative writing at the International Institute of Modern Letters.

Her first collection, It Has No Sound and Is Blue, was published in 1987, and won her the Commonwealth Poetry Prize for Best First Time Published Poet that year. It was largely written while she was living in New York City, where she worked as a social worker while studying for a Master of Fine Arts in Creative Writing at Brooklyn College with John Ashbery. The key poem, "Writing Home", is modelled on the "Jerusalem Sonnets" of James K. Baxter but from a feminist perspective. Harry Ricketts, writing for the Oxford Companion to New Zealand Literature, considers that she is also influenced by Wallace Stevens and Adrienne Rich. Her next collection, Small Stories of Devotion (1991, published in the United Kingdom in 1995) and established Hawken's reputation as one of several successful women poets who emerged in the 1980s.

In 2007 she received the Lauris Edmond Award for Distinguished Contribution to Poetry. In 2008 she wrote seven poems to accompany a performance by the New Zealand String Quartet of The Seven Last Words of Christ by Joseph Haydn.

In 2015 and 2021, her work was selected for inclusion in the annual anthology Best New Zealand Poems. In 2024 she published the collection Faces and Flowers: Poems to Patricia France, exploring the work of New Zealand artist Patricia France, her father's cousin, through poetry. Sophie van Waardenberg, reviewing the collection for the Aotearoa New Zealand Review of Books, described Hawken as "a wholehearted, surefooted poet": each poem "seeks, with sensitivity and patience, to find out or at least gesture toward a little more of France's life".

In 2025, Hawken received the Prime Minister's Award for Literary Achievement.

== Style and themes ==
Many of Hawken's works feature themes of nature, spirituality and the experiences of women, and her poetry is often written in a prose-like form. Van Waardenberg describes Hawken's poetic voice as being one "of gentle candour".

== Selected works ==
- It Has No Sound and Is Blue (1987)
- Small Stories of Devotion (1991, United Kingdom edition published in 1995)
- Water, Leaves, Stones (1995)
- The Little Book of Bitching (1998)
- Where We Say We Are (2000)
- Oh There You Are Tui! (2001)
- One Shapely Thing: Poems and journals (2006)
- The Leaf-Ride (2011)
- There Is No Harbour (2019)
- Sea-Light (2021)
- Faces and Flowers: Poems to Patricia France (2024)
- Peace and Quiet (2026)
