= Caoilinn Hughes =

Irish novelist

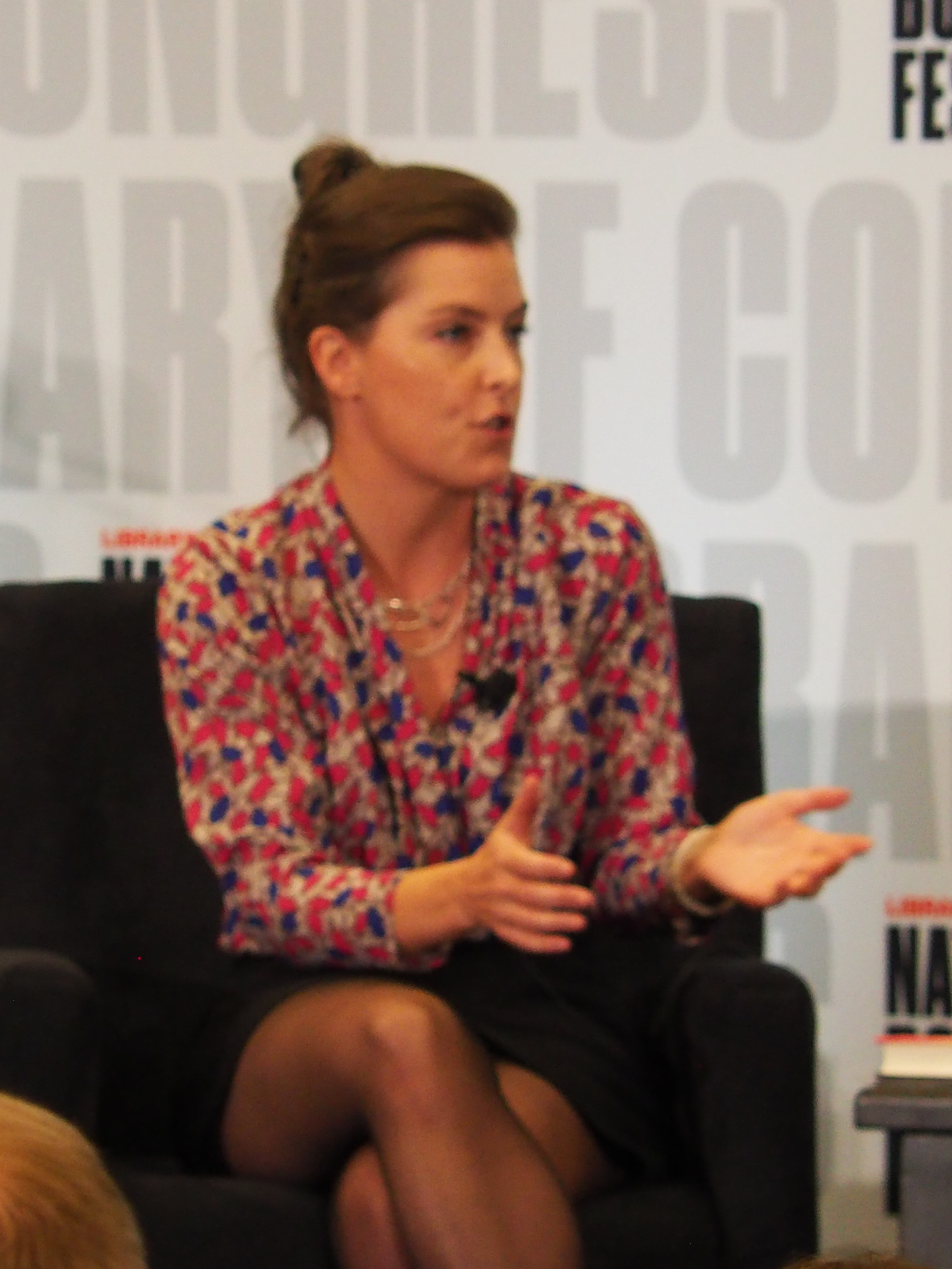
- Hughes in August 2019
- Education: Queen's University Belfast, Victoria University of Wellington
- Writing career
- Notable works: Gathering Evidence (2014); Orchid & the Wasp (2018); The Wild Laughter (2020)

Caoilinn Hughes is an Irish novelist and short story writer.

She was the 2021 Writer Fellow at Trinity College Dublin.

== Life ==
She holds BA and MA degrees from Queen's University Belfast, and a PhD in English Literature from Victoria University of Wellington, New Zealand.

Her poetry collection, Gathering Evidence (Carcanet Press, 2014), won the Irish Times Shine/Strong Award in 2015. She was a James Merrill House Fellow in Stonington, CT in 2016.

Her debut novel, Orchid & the Wasp (Oneworld / Hogarth Press, 2018), won the 2019 Collyer Bristow Prize, was shortlisted for the Hearst Big Book Award and the Butler Literary Award, and was longlisted for the Authors' Club Best First Novel Award and the International Dublin Literary Award 2020. In 2018, she won The Moth Short Story Prize for her story "Psychobabble". In 2019, she won an O. Henry Award for her short story "Prime". She won the An Post Irish Book Awards' writing.ie Story of the Year 2020.

Her second novel, The Wild Laughter (Oneworld, 2020), won the Royal Society of Literature's Encore Award 2021, and was shortlisted for the An Post Irish Book Awards' Novel of the Year 2020, the RTÉ Radio 1 Listeners' Choice Award, the Dalkey Literary Award (Emerging Writer), and was longlisted for the 2021 Dylan Thomas Prize.

== Works ==
- Gathering Evidence, Carcanet Press, 2014. ISBN 9781847772626
- Orchid & the Wasp, Oneworld Publications/Hogarth Press, 2018. ISBN 9781524761103
- The Wild Laughter, Oneworld Publications, 2020. ISBN 9781786077806
- The Alternatives, Riverhead Books, 2024. ISBN 9780593545003
