= Sam Duckor-Jones =

New Zealand sculptor and poet

Sam Duckor-Jones (born 1982) is a New Zealand sculptor, poet, and artist.

== Biography ==
Duckor-Jones grew up in Wellington, in a Jewish family. His father is the New Zealand author, Lloyd Jones, and his brother is Avi Duckor-Jones, who won season one of Survivor NZ. He is the nephew of businessman and politician Sir Bob Jones.

Duckor-Jones lived in Featherston for many years, relocating there from Wellington because of the more affordable rent to live and have a studio. In 2021, he moved to Greymouth to pursue his Gloria art project.

=== Sculpture ===
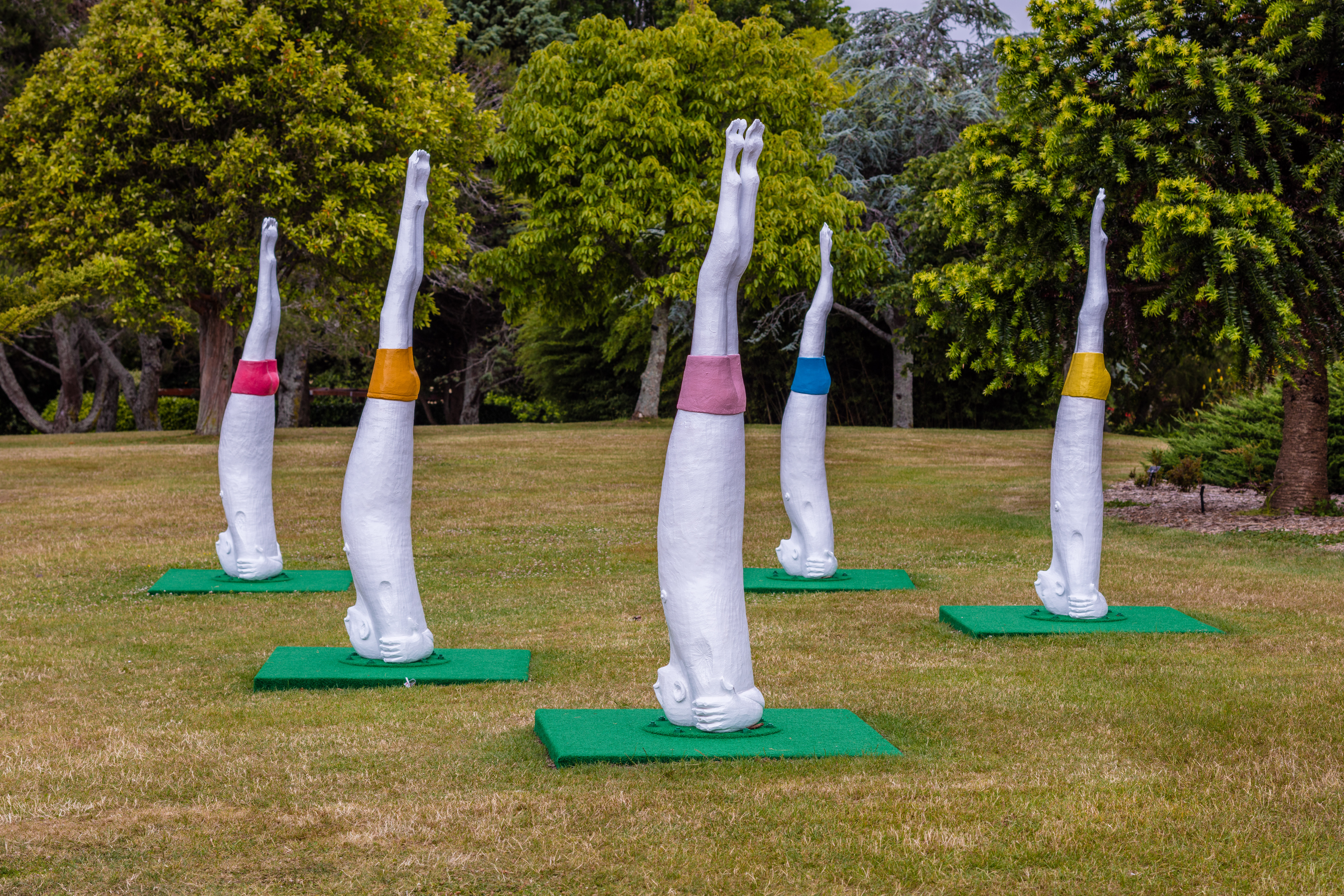
Strong Men Point Their Toes (2015), Sam Duckor-Jones

Duckor-Jones started his artistic career as a sculptor, mostly clay pieces of men. These sculptures are generally 1.8–2.1 metres (6–7 ft) tall, and brightly painted. His sculptures have been displayed at the Bowen Gallery in Wellington, Aratoi Wairarapa Museum of Art and History in Masterton, and the Auckland Botanic Gardens in Manurewa.

Duckor-Jones was a finalist in the 2014 Portage Ceramic Awards. He was the 2016 artist-in-residence at Wellesley College in Eastbourne, and the 2017 resident at Scots College in Wellington.

=== Poetry ===
In 2017, Duckor-Jones completed his Master of Arts (MA) degree in creative writing at the International Institute of Modern Letters at Victoria University of Wellington. His first book of poetry, People from the Pit Stand Up, published in 2018, was based on the work that he created during his MA programme.

His second book of poetry, Party Legend, was published in 2021. The central sequence of the book, as he describes, is that he had decided that he did not want to be a poet-artist any more and in 2019 enrolled in a science degree. He eventually dropped out of the degree, but the poems in the book drew on multiple scientific themes and words.

On writing poetry, Duckor-Jones said that it is easier for him to be gestural in poetry, than in his ceramics. He has said that Frank O'Hara is influential on his writing.

Duckor-Jones received the Biggs Poetry Prize from Victoria University of Wellington in 2017. Chris Tse has said that Duckor-Jones' poetry has influenced his own writing.

=== Gloria ===
In 2021, Duckor-Jones bought St Andrew's Church in Greymouth, and has since converted it into a "queer place of worship"; a sculpture, named Gloria. The structure was built by the Anglican Church in 1939, but had fallen into disuse by 2000, and was deconsecrated in 2018.

Duckor-Jones named the structure Gloria in reference to "Christian hymns, disco and a make-believe character [he] and his brother created when they were children". Gloria is heavily influenced by camp, with Duckor-Jones acknowledging the impact Susan Sontag has had on the project. He painted Gloria bright pink, and reforested the lawn with native fauna because of his anti-lawn philosophy. He intends to fill the space with 50 two-metre-tall (6.6 ft) clay and papier-mâché parishioners. The complete conversion of Gloria from church to sculpture is expected to be finished by 2027.

In early June 2022, Gloria was vandalised with homophobic and antisemitic messages, references to Leviticus, and a pride flag being burned on the front lawn. Three men appeared in the Greymouth District Court, where they all plead guilty and were discharged without conviction. A fourth offender pled guilty in the Wellington District Court and was also discharged without conviction.

== Published works ==
- Duckor-Jones, Sam (2018). People from the Pit Stand Up. Victoria University Press. ISBN 978-1-77656-193-3. OCLC 1042120801.
- Ducker-Jones, Sam (2021). Party Legend. Victoria University Press. ISBN 978-1-77656-423-1. OCLC 1246550598.
