= Serie Barford =

New Zealand poet

Serie Barford is a performance poet from Auckland, New Zealand.

Her poetry collection, Tapa Talk, was published in 2007 to critical acclaim. She has published four other books of poetry (in 1985, 1989, 2015, and 2021). Her poems and short stories have been published in journals and anthologies, among them Mauri Ola, Whetu Moana, Niu Voices, Landfall, Poetry New Zealand, Dreadlocks, Writing the Pacific, Trout, Blackmail Press, Snorkel and Best New Zealand Poems. Sleeping with Stones was shortlisted for the Mary and Peter Biggs Award for Poetry at the 2022 Ockham New Zealand Book Awards.

She has Samoan, European and Algonquin Indian ancestry.
