= Emma Neale =

New Zealand novelist and poet

Emma Jane Neale
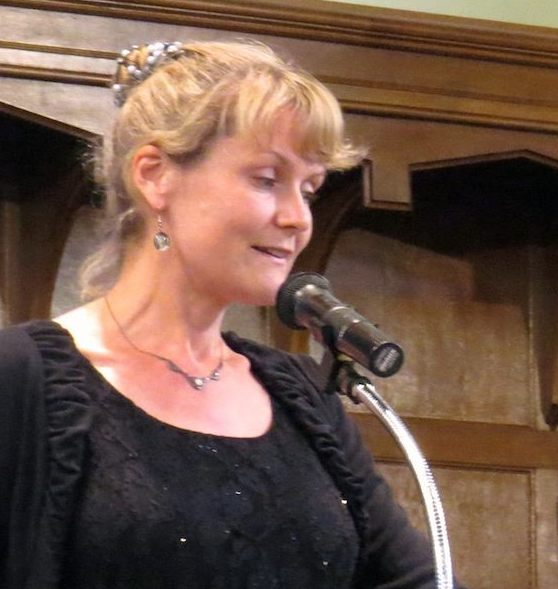
- Emma Neale, reading poetry in Dunedin in March 2016
- Born: 2 January 1969 (age 57); Dunedin, New Zealand
- Education: Victoria University of Wellington; University College London
- Writing career
- Language: English
- Genres: Fiction, poetry

Emma Neale (born 2 January 1969) is a novelist and poet from New Zealand.

== Background ==
Neale was born in Dunedin and grew up in Christchurch, San Diego, and Wellington. She received her undergraduate degree from Victoria University of Wellington and was awarded an MA and PhD from University College London. Following her graduation she returned to New Zealand to work for Longacre Press, working for ten years as editor then senior editor.

== Works ==
Neale's first work was published in 1998 and her writing has been featured extensively in magazines, newspapers and journals, and several anthologies.

=== Novels ===
- Night Swimming (Penguin Random House, 1998)
- Little Moon (Random House, 2001)
- Double Take (Random House, 2003)
- Relative Strangers (Vintage, 2006)
- Fosterling (Vintage, 2011)
- Billy Bird (Penguin Random House, 2016)
- Maybe Baby (Bateman Books, 2026)

=== Poetry ===
- Sleeve-Notes (Random House, 1999)
- How to Make a Million (Godwit, 2002)
- Spark (Steele Roberts, 2008)
- The Truth Garden (Otago University Press, 2012)
- Tender Machines (Otago University Press, 2015)
- To the Occupant (Otago University Press, 2019)
- Liar, Liar, Lick, Spit (Otago University Press, 2024)
- Poems included in the Best New Zealand Poems series (2002, 2007, 2008, 2009, 2014, 2018, 2020 & 2024)

=== Editorial ===
Neale has served as editor for:

- Creative Juices (Flamingo, 2003)
- Best New Zealand Poems (Victoria University of Wellington, 2004)
- Swings and Roundabouts (Godwit, 2008)
- Manifesto Aotearoa: 101 Political Poems (Otago University Press, 2017)

In October, 2017, Neale was appointed editor of Landfall, a literary journal published by Otago University Press. She stepped down as editor in April 2021.

== Awards ==
Neale's work has been awarded and nominated for several literary prizes including:

- The Janet Frame Prize (2025)
- Ockham New Zealand Book Awards, Mary and Peter Biggs Award for Poetry (2025), winner for Liar, Liar, Lick, Spit
- Ockham New Zealand Book Awards, Acorn Foundation Fiction Prize (2017), shortlisted for Billy Bird
- Ockham New Zealand Book Awards (2016), longlisted for Tender Machines
- Sarah Broom Poetry Prize (2014), poetry included in the shortlist
- Sir Julius Vogel Award youth category (2011), shortlisted for Fosterling
- Kathleen Grattan Award for poetry (2011) awarded to The Truth Garden
- Takahe Poetry Competition (2008), first place for the poem 'Well'
- NZSA Janet Frame Memorial Award for Literature (2008)

=== Residencies and fellowships ===
In 2012, she was awarded the Robert Burns Fellowship, a literary residency at the University of Otago in Dunedin, New Zealand. She has also been awarded the Todd/Creative New Zealand New Writers Bursary (2000), the Peter & Dianne Beatson Fellowship (2014), and was a University of Otago/Sir James Wallace Pah Homestead Fellow.

== Personal ==
She is a daughter of writer Barbara Else and her first husband James Neale.
