= Alison Wong =

New Zealand poet and novelist

Alison Wong (born 1960) is a New Zealand poet and novelist of Chinese heritage. Her background in mathematics comes across in her poetry, not as a subject, but in the careful formulation of words to white space and precision. She has a son with New Zealand poet Linzy Forbes. She now lives in Geelong. She is a 2024 Arts Foundation Te Tumu Toi Laureate.

== Early life and education ==
Wong was born in Te Matau-a-Māui and is of Cantonese descent. She studied mathematics and creative writing at Victoria University of Wellington.

== Career and awards ==
Wong's first novel As the Earth Turns Silver was published in late June 2009 by Penguin NZ and won the fiction award at the 2010 New Zealand Post Book Awards, and was shortlisted for the Australian Prime Minister's Literary Awards.

Wong has received various other awards for her fiction and poetry including the 2002 Robert Burns Fellowship at the University of Otago, a Reader's Digest - New Zealand Society of Authors Fellowship at the Stout Research Centre and a NZ Founders Society Research Award. She has been a finalist in several poetry competitions and received grants from Creative NZ and the Willi Fels Memorial Trust.

Her first poetry collection, Cup, was released in February 2006 by Steele Roberts. It was shortlisted for a poetry prize in the Montana Book awards.

In 2003 she was a guest writer at the Auckland Writers and Readers Festival and the Wordstruck! Festival in Dunedin, as well as a speaker for the Stout Research Centre Chinese New Zealand Seminar Series. In 2001 together with Linzy Forbes, she received a Porirua City Council Civic Honour Award for co-founding and running Poetry Cafe.

In 2024 Wong was awarded the Burr/Tatham Trust Award, making her an Arts Foundation Te Tumu Toi Laureate.
