= Read NZ Te Pou Muramura =

Not-for-profit organisation that promotes books and reading in New Zealand

- Established: 1972; 54 years ago
- Type: Not-for-profit organisation
- Legal status: Charity
- Purpose: Promotion of books and reading in New Zealand
- Location: New Zealand
- Services: Writers in Schools programme
- Chief executive: Juliet Blyth (2020–)
- Board chair: Willow Sainsbury (2021–)
- Website: www.read-nz.org
- Formerly called: New Zealand Book Council

Read NZ Te Pou Muramura (formerly the New Zealand Book Council) is a not-for-profit organisation that presents a wide range of programmes to promote books and reading in New Zealand. It was established in 1972 and its programmes have included supporting writers' visits to schools and enabling writers to travel to different areas of New Zealand.

== History ==
The organisation was established as the New Zealand Book Council in 1972 as a response to UNESCO's International Book Year. Author Fiona Kidman was the founding secretary of the organisation. The original purposes of the organisation included to bring together different parts of the book industry (including writers, booksellers, teachers, publishers and librarians), and to encourage reading in New Zealand. In December 1972 the organisation advertised for founding members, with a year's membership costing NZ$3.

In the 1980s the organisation spoke out against books being subject to New Zealand's GST (goods and services tax), saying this was in breach of international agreements. Roger Douglas, then Minister of Finance, said in response that there were no good grounds for books to be exempted from the tax.

In 2014 and 2015 the organisation ran the "Great Kiwi Classic" event together with the Auckland Writers Festival, asking readers to nominate their favourite New Zealand classic novel. In 2014 the bone people by Keri Hulme was selected, followed in 2015 with Owls Do Cry by Janet Frame.

In 2017, the organisation commissioned a survey into New Zealanders' reading habits, and found that around 400,000 New Zealanders had not read a book in the previous year. The survey was repeated in 2018 and again in 2022; in 2018 it found a slight decline in reading by adults, and that 57% of all readers had read a New Zealand book in the previous year. The 2022 survey found that men's reading continued to fall.

In 2019, the organisation changed its name to Read NZ Te Pou Muramura. The Māori language name Te Pou Muramura is about moving from darkness to light.

== Writers in Schools and other programmes ==
Read NZ Te Pou Muramura runs various public event programmes that take New Zealand and international writers to venues around the country.

One programme is Writers in Schools, which takes New Zealand writers and illustrators into schools throughout the country. This programme has run since the organisation was first established in the 1970s, with Noel Hilliard the first writer to tour schools. In 1977, following the success of a pilot, 39 writers were hired to tour schools, including Sam Hunt and Denis Glover. In 2007 the programme was estimated to reach 50,000 New Zealand students each year. The programme is subsidised by Creative New Zealand and charitable donations.

In 1997 the organisation established a yearly writers' exchange programme with Australia, to encourage readership of New Zealand books in Australia. Peter Wells was the first author to take part in the exchange.

The Words on Wheels initiative was an annual initiative beginning in 1998, and enabled writers to travel to a different part of rural New Zealand each year, sometimes in collaboration with local literary festivals. In 2007 writer David Hill said of the programme: "Every time I do a tour I hear people say how brilliant it is to see and hear writers in the flesh. This is the New Zealand part of the New Zealand Book Council in action."

Other programmes have included Writers Visiting Prisons, Writers In Youth Justice, Meet the Author and Writers to Book Groups.

== Writers Files and other publications ==
Read NZ Te Pou Muramura produces the Writers Files, an online database of profiles of New Zealand writers which is regularly updated.

From 1981 to 2013 the organisation published Booknotes, a quarterly publication distributed free to members. In 1995 the organisation published Bookenz: A Traveller's Guide to New Zealand Books, described by Iain Sharp as a "handy little leaflet".

== Notable people ==
- Maggie Barry (chair in 2007)
- Clarence Beeby (founding board member, elected president in 1978)
- Jo Cribb (chief executive, 2017–2019)
- Fiona Kidman (founding secretary, and later chair in the mid-1990s)
- Keith Sinclair (founding president, until 1978)
- Lydia Wevers (vice-president)
- Robin Williams (chair in the 1990s)
- Jim Wilson (executive member 1972 to 1988, including president from 1981 to 1984)
