= Talia Marshall =

New Zealand writer

Talia Marshall (Ngāti Kuia/Rangitāne o Wairau/Ngāti Rārua/Ngāti Takihiku), born 1978, is a New Zealand writer of Māori descent who writes essays, poetry and short stories. She lives in Dunedin.

== Biography ==
Marshall affiliates to the Māori nations of Ngāti Kuia, Rangitāne o Wairau, Ngāti Rārua and Ngāti Takihiku. She lives in Dunedin.

Marshall has written stories, essays, and poems for Takahē, The Spinoff, Pantograph Punch, in North & South magazine, and the Otago Daily Times. Marshall has also written multiple in-memoriam poems for Newsroom. Emma Espiner described her as "one of [New Zealand's] greatest essayists".

In 2020 Marshall was announced as the inaugural Emerging Māori Writer in Residence for the International Institute of Modern Letters (IIML), Victoria University of Wellington. Professor Damien Wilkins described her as having an "astonishing voice". In 2021 she won the Surrey-Hotel writers residency and appeared in the VERB Festival in Wellington, writing for the series Art History is a Mother. She has run guest workshops for Prospect Park Productions. In 2023 she ran a successful crowdfunding campaign for travel costs to help her complete a manuscript for Te Herenga Waka University Press. Her work has been published in the anthology Tell You What (Great New Zealand Nonfiction 2017).

== Personal life ==
Previously she worked as a caregiver in a rest home.
