= John Allison (anthroposophist) =

New Zealand poet, musician, and teacher (1950–2024)

John Allison (7 October 1950 – 14 March 2024) was a New Zealand poet, musician, and teacher in Rudolf Steiner (Waldorf) education.

Allison was born in Blenheim, New Zealand, and taught at the Christchurch Waldorf Steiner School for twenty-four years. He lectured and wrote on themes related to poetic imagination and observation, anthroposophy, and Waldorf education, although in later life he was no longer formally associated with anthroposophy.

== Publications ==
=== Prose ===
- Walking Out of Another World, Immortal Books, Murwillumbah, 2010
- A Teacher's Book: Digging Deeper, Immortal Books, Murwillumbah, 2008
- A Way of Seeing: Perception, Imagination, and Poetry, Lindisfarne Books, Great Barrington, 2003
- Living in Light Loving the Dark, Initiative Circle of the Waldorf Pedagogical Section in New Zealand, 2003
- Where Children Are: Beginning to Understand Waldorf Education, Initiative Circle of the Waldorf Pedagogical Section in New Zealand, 2001

=== Poetry ===
- I Came This Way Some Time Before: Selected Poems, Sudden Valley Press, Governors Bay, 2025
- A Long Road Trip Home, Cold Hub Press, Lyttelton, 2023
- Near Distance, Cold Hub Press, Lyttelton, 2020
- A Place to Return To, Cold Hub Press, Lyttelton, 2019
- Balance, Five Islands Press, Melbourne, 2006
- Stone Moon Dark Water, Sudden Valley Press, Christchurch, 1999
- Both Roads Taken, Sudden Valley Press, Christchurch, 1997
- Dividing the Light, Hazard Press, Christchurch, 1997
