= Hana Pera Aoake =

New Zealand artist, poet and writer (born 1990)

- Born: June 27, 1990 (age 36); Matamata, New Zealand.
- Occupations: Artist, Poet, Writer
- Children: 1
- Writing career
- Pen name: Hana Aoake

Hana Pera Aoake (born 27 June 1990) is a New Zealand artist, poet and writer.

== Life and career ==
Hana Pera Aoake was born and raised in Matamata in the North Island of New Zealand. She is Māori of Ngaati Mahuta, Ngaati Hinerangi, Waikato/Tainui, Waitaha, and Ngaati Waewae ki Kai Tahu Poutini descent.

Aoake is a co-founder of the Dunedin Artist-run space Fresh and Fruity which began in 2014. A museum exhibition of their work at was held at Toi Moroki Centre of Contemporary Art in 2017. At the time of this exhibition Fresh and Fruity consisted of Aoake and Mya Morrison-Middleton. The artists described the collective as "a sexy new look designed to slowly smash the neocolonial heteropatriarchy one sarcastic hashtag at a time #cuterthanu"

A Bathful of Kawakawa and Hot Water, Aoake's first collection of poetry, was published by Compound Press in 2020. Kawakawa is endemic to New Zealand, and holds significance in Māori culture. Poet Paula Green wrote in a review of A Bathful of Kawakawa in 2020 that the book was "an incisive and vital probe, drawing on reading, ideas, history, the present and the future, challenging Western discourse, asking questions, musing on what 'constitutes a common', on the co-option of Maaori concepts by Paakeha, on the inseparability of body and mauri, on the damaged world, on the power of myth."

In 2024, Aoake was awarded a residency at the Delfina Foundation in London. The artist wrote that she "hopes to share and learn more about how art spaces can work with different communities to facilitate different conversations and exchanges."

== Bibliography ==
=== Poetry Collections ===
- A Bathful of Kawakawa and Hot Water: Selected Writings (Compound Press, 2020) ISBN 9780995125131
- Some Helpful Models of Grief (Compound Press, 2025) ISBN 9781067072704
- BLAME IT ON THE RAIN (No More Poetry, 2025) ISBN 9780975642542

== Key exhibitions ==
- Folded Memory, Te Pātaka Toi Adam Art Gallery, Wellington, 2023
- Matarau, City Gallery Wellington Te Whare Toi, Wellington, 2022
- Te Tamaiti, Te Ao, Artspace Aotearoa, Auckland, 2022
- The Tomorrow People, Te Pātaka Toi Adam Art Gallery, Wellington, 2017
- Making Space: Fresh and Fruity, Toi Moroki Centre of Contemporary Art, Christchurch, 2017

== Work in Public Art Collections ==
- Ngā Puhipuhi o Te Herenga Waka—Victoria University of Wellington Art Collection
