= Sarah Quigley =

New Zealand author

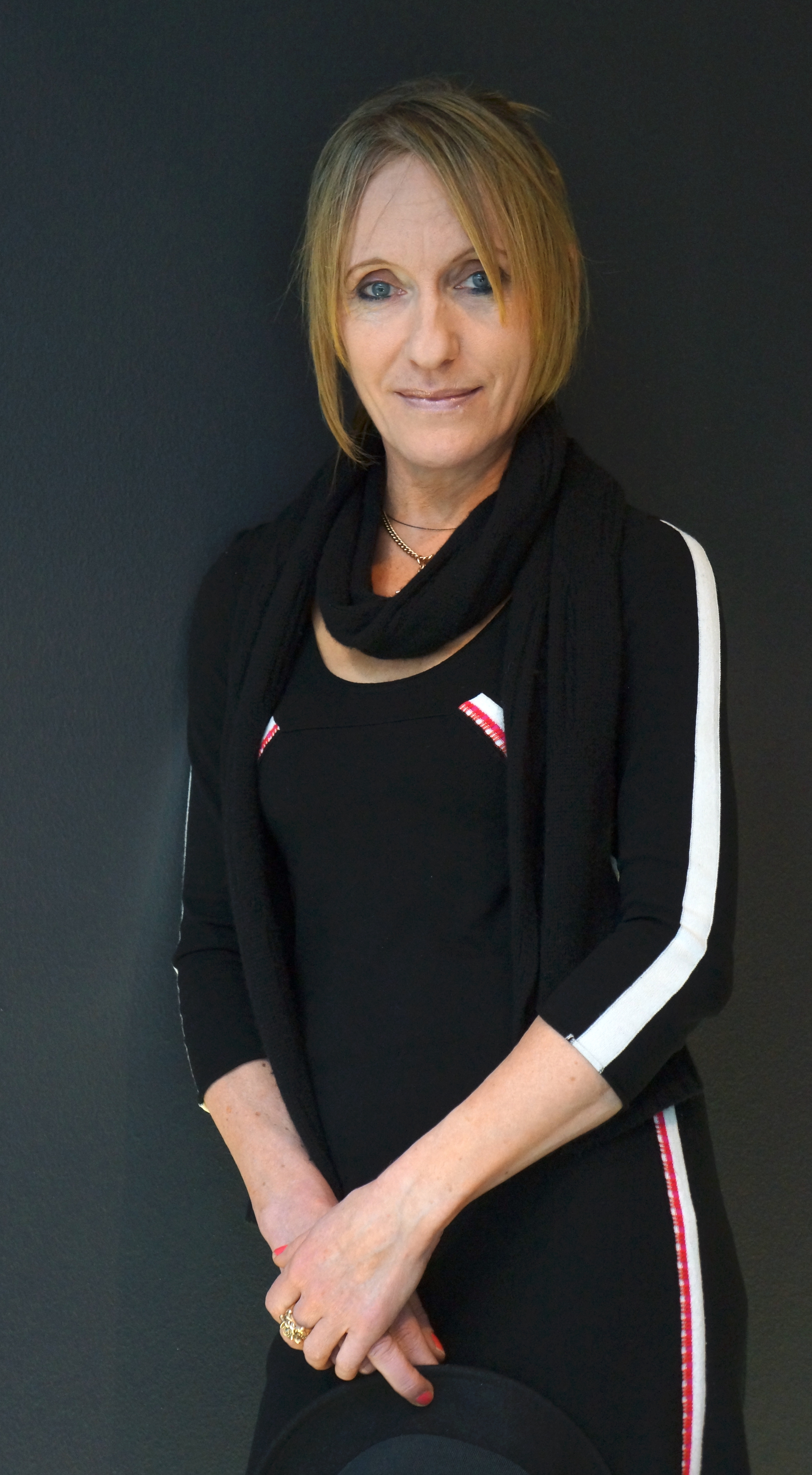
- At 2012 Frankfurt Book Fair
- Education: University of Oxford
- Occupation: Writer
- Writing career
- Language: English, German
- Genres: Fiction, non-fiction, poetry
- Notable work: The Conductor
- Website: www.sarahvquigley.com

Sarah Quigley is a New Zealand writer.

== Background ==
Sarah Quigley was born in Christchurch, New Zealand, on the 1 October 1967. She has an MA Hons from the University of Canterbury, on the poetry of Charles Brasch, and a DPhil in English Literature from the University of Oxford. After winning the Creative New Zealand Berlin Writers Residency in 2000, she divided her time between Germany and New Zealand. She met her Swedish-born husband in Berlin.

== Career ==
A graduate of Bill Manhire’s creative writing course, Quigley won the Buddle Findlay Sargeson Fellowship in 1998. Her short stories and poetry have been widely broadcast and published, and she has won many prizes including the Sunday Star-Times Short Story Award and the Commonwealth Pacific Rim Short Story Award. Her publications include novels, short fiction, a creative writing manual and poetry collections, many of which have sold internationally. Her novel The Conductor (2011) was the highest-selling adult fiction title in New Zealand in 2011, staying at number one for 20 weeks.

== Awards ==
In 2001, Quigley won the Commonwealth Short Story Award and received first place in the Sunday Star-Times Short Story Competition for Breathing Out.

In 2002, she received the CLNZ Writers' Award to write a biography of the poet and patron of writers, Charles Brasch. She was shortlisted in the Reviewer of the Year category of the 1999 and 2000 Montana New Zealand Book Awards.

The Conductor was awarded the Nielsen BookData New Zealand Booksellers Choice Award in 2012. It was longlisted for the 2012 International IMPAC Award and was shortlisted for the Prix Femina in France.

In 2015, she won the MPA Columnist of the Year for her Next magazine column The Divorce Diaries, and was runner-up for the award in 2016 and 2019.

=== Residencies and fellowships ===
Quigley received the Buddle Findlay Sargeson Fellowship in 1998. In 2003 she was awarded the Robert Burns Fellowship (alongside Nick Ascroft), a literary residency at the University of Otago in Dunedin, New Zealand. Quigley won the Creative New Zealand Berlin Writers Residency in 2000.

== Works ==
=== Novels ===
- The divorce diaries (2020)
- The Suicide Club (2017)
- The Conductor (2011)
- Fifty Days (2004)
- Shot (2003)
- After Robert (2000)
- having words with you (1998)

=== Short stories ===
- Tenderness (2014), collection of short stories

Work by Quigley was included in:

- Primal Picnics (2011)
- The Best of New Zealand Fiction 5 (2008)
- Second Violins (2008)
- The Cat's Whiskers (2008)
- The Best of New Zealand Fiction 4 (2007)
- Sunday 22 (2006)
- Landfall 209 (2005)
- The Best of New Zealand Fiction 1 (2004)
- Essential New Zealand Short Stories (2002)
- 100 NZ Short Short Stories (1997)

=== Poetry ===
- Love in a Bookstore or Your Money Back (2003), collected poems
- New Poetry 1 (1999), with Anna Jackson and Raewyn Alexander)

Poems by Quigley were included in:

- New New Zealand Poets in Performance (2008)

=== Non-fiction ===
- Write: a 30 day guide to creative writing (2006)
