= Chris Price (poet) =

New Zealand poet

- Born: 1962 (age 63–64); Reading
- Occupation: Writer

Chris Price (born 1962) is a poet, editor and creative writing teacher. She lives in Wellington, New Zealand.

== Biography ==
Price was born in 1962 in Reading, Berkshire, and moved with her family from England to Auckland in 1966. She came from a family of great readers. At secondary school, her entry in a school poetry award judged by Lauris Edmond was highly commended, and at university she took a writing workshop taught by C.K. Stead.

She completed an MA (Hons) in languages and literature from the University of Auckland in 1986, and later an MA in creative writing from Victoria University of Wellington.

She was an editor for Reed Publishing from 1989 until 1993, editor of Landfall from 1993 to 2000 and coordinator of Writers and Readers Week for the New Zealand International Arts Festival in Wellington from 1992 to 2004.

Her poems have been published in anthologies and in 2006, she was part of the Are Angels OK? Project, in which ten New Zealand writers and scientists collaborated in pairs as a way to mark the International Year of Physics. In 2012, she was one of three New Zealand and three German poets in another collaborative writing project, the Transit of Venus Poetry Exchange. The resulting work formed part of New Zealand's Guest of Honour programme at the Frankfurt Book Fair in 2012, and Transit of Venus / Venustransit was published by Victoria University Press in 2016.

Price taught the undergraduate Poetry workshop at the International Institute of Modern Letters (IIML) at Victoria University of Wellington from 2004 to 2009, and also managed its public events programmes and edited the online journal Turbine. Since 2009, she has been convenor of the Poetry and Creative Nonfiction stream of the MA course at the IIML

== Awards and prizes ==
Husk won the New Zealand Society of Authors Jessie Mackay Best First Book Award for Poetry at the 2002 Montana New Zealand Book Awards.

Brief Lives was shortlisted in the biography category for the 2007 Montana New Zealand Book Awards and also won the 2007 PANZ Book Design Award for Best Non-Illustrated Book.

Beside Herself was longlisted for the 2017 Ockham New Zealand Book Awards.

Price's essay "The Lobster's Tail" was longlisted for the Notting Hill Essay Prize in 2015.

She was Auckland University Writer in Residence at the Michael King Writers Centre in 2008, and the Katherine Mansfield Fellow in Menton in 2011.

In 2015 she was awarded a residency at the Château Lavigny, Switzerland.

== Bibliography ==
- Husk (Auckland University Press, 2002)
- Brief Lives (Auckland University Press, 2006)
- The Blind Singer (2009)
- Beside Herself, drawings by Leo Bensemann (Auckland University Press, 2016)
