= Bernadette Hall =

New Zealand playwright and poet

Bernadette Hall MNZM
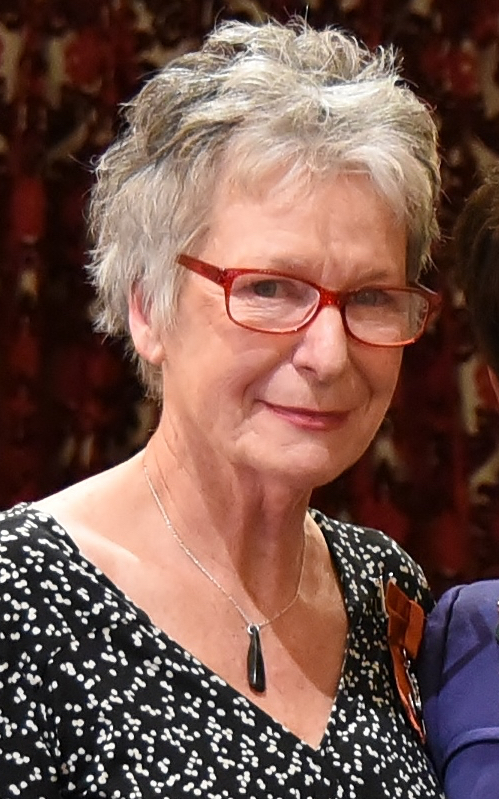
- Hall in 2017
- Born: 1945 (age 80–81); Alexandra, New Zealand
- Education: University of Otago
- Occupation: Writer
- Writing career
- Notable awards: Robert Burns Fellowship

Bernadette Hall MNZM (born 1945) is a New Zealand playwright and poet.

== Biography ==
Hall was born in 1945 in Alexandra, New Zealand. She was raised in what she describes as "a small-city Catholic community that was proud, theatrical and pretty much enclosed." After a career as a teacher of Latin and classical studies, she started writing full-time in her forties. She has held residencies at both Canterbury University and Victoria University and is widely published. She spent 10 years as the editor of Takahe magazine and five as the poetry editor of The Press, Christchurch's main daily newspaper.

Hall's poetry collection The Lustre Jug was a finalist in the 2010 New Zealand Post Book Awards.

She is the patron of Hagley Writers' Institute.

== Works ==
=== Plays ===
- Glad and the Angels (1992)
- The Clothesline (1993)
- The Girl Who Sings Waterfalls (1992)

=== Poetry collections ===
- Heartwood (Caxton Press, Christchurch, 1989)
- of Elephants etc. (Untold Press, 1990)
- The Persistent Levitator (Victoria University Press, 1994)
- Still Talking (Victoria University Press, 1997)
- Settler Dreaming (Victoria University Press, 2001)
- The Merino Princess: Selected Poems (Victoria University Press, 2004)
- The Ponies (Victoria University Press, 2007)
- The Lustre Jug (Victoria University Press, 2009)
- Life & Customs (Victoria University Press, 2014)

== Awards and honours ==
- 1991 – Writer in residence at the University of Canterbury
- 1996 – Robert Burns Fellowship at the University of Otago
- 2004 – Antarctica New Zealand Arts Fellowship
- 2006 – Writer's fellowship at Victoria University
- 2015 – Prime Minister's Awards for Literary Achievement in Poetry
- 2017 – Appointed a Member of the New Zealand Order of Merit, for services to literature, in the 2017 New Year Honours
