= Peter Olds =

New Zealand poet (1944–2023)

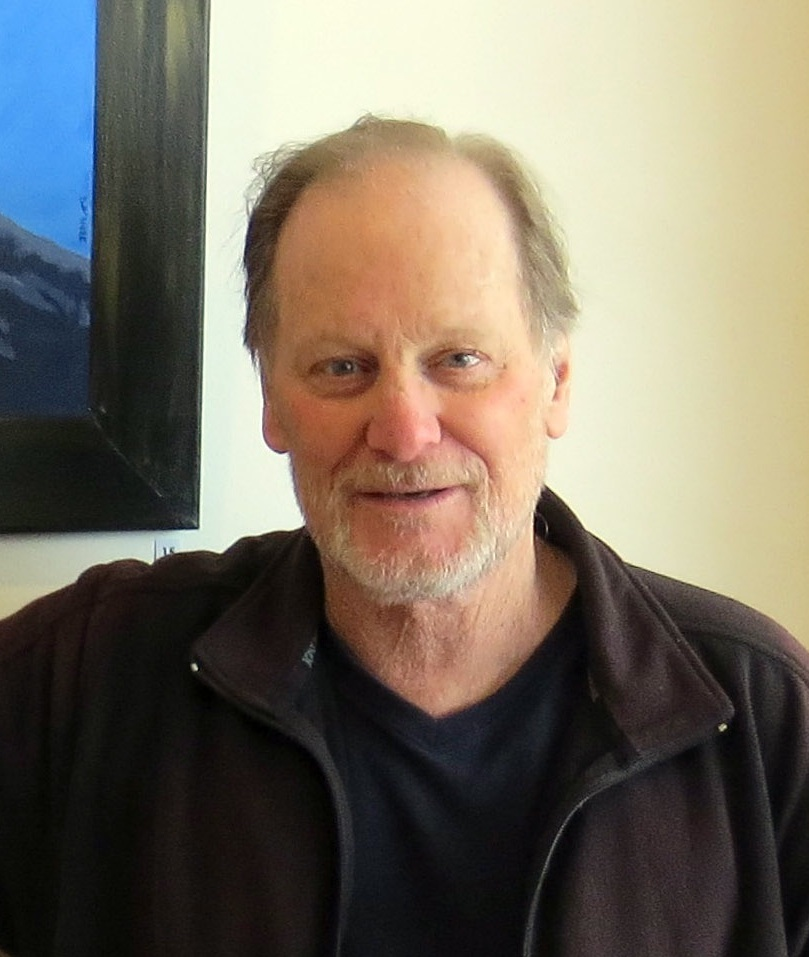
- Olds in 2014
- Born: Peter John Olds; 2 June 1944; Christchurch, New Zealand
- Died: 31 August 2023 (aged 79); Dunedin, New Zealand
- Occupation: Writer
- Writing career
- Genre: Poetry
- Notable awards: Robert Burns Fellowship

Peter John Olds (2 June 1944 – 31 August 2023) was a New Zealand poet from Dunedin. He was regarded as being a significant contributor within New Zealand literary circles, in particular, having an influence with younger poets in the 1970s. Olds held the University of Otago Robert Burns Fellowship and was the inaugural winner of the Janet Frame Literary Award. During the 1970s he spent time in the community of Jerusalem with James K Baxter.

== Selected publications ==
=== Early work ===
Olds left school at 15, settled in Dunedin in the mid-60s and began writing in 1966, completing a one-act play while he was employed by the Globe Theatre building stage sets. In 1968 he suffered a breakdown, and after spending time in a mental hospital, joined James K. Baxter at the Jerusalem commune, returning to Dunedin in 1971 in order to write his first volume of poetry, Lady Moss Revived (1972). This was followed by V-8 Poems (1972), The Snow and the Glass Window (1973), Freeway (1974), Doctor’s Rock (1976) and Beethoven’s Guitar and After Looking for Broadway (1980). His published broadsheets include Exit: 2 Poems (1971), Schizophrenic Highway (1971), and The Habits You Left Behind: Poem (1972). He replied to his friend James K. Baxter's poem Letter to Peter Olds (1972) with his Doctor’s Rock.

=== Later collections ===
Poetry Reading at Kaka Point was published in 2006, and In the Dragon Cafe, which features Letter to Hone Tuwhare in 2007. Under the Dundas Street Bridge, previewed as being "personal...the author takes us tripping down alleyways of his own confusion: waterbottle in backpack, notepad in hand, stalking the town like an evangelist on a mission", was released in 2012. In 2014 You fit the description: the selected poems of Peter Olds was published. A review of the book by the publisher included an introduction by Ian Wedde.

Taking my Jacket for a Walk, a work completed by Olds in 2017, was translated into Spanish in 2020 by Dr Rogelio Guedea, a "Mexican-born poet, crime novelist and academic", who taught Spanish at the University of Otago where he became familiar with Olds' work. Guedea said that Olds was an important writer whose work deserved to be read more widely. He described Olds as having a "great critical sense of humour...[and was]...wonderful at capturing the absurdity of life". Olds was surprised and pleased with the outcome.

Sheep Truck and other poems (2022) is described on the publisher's website as "a collection of 29 new poems by veteran Dunedin poet Peter Olds. Subjects include flying, dental treatment, encountering Charles Bukowski in the Dunedin Public Library, and not wanting to get out of bed."

== Impact on the New Zealand literary scene ==
The Oxford Companion to New Zealand Literature notes that Olds was "considered a central figure to many younger poets in the 1970s because of his ability to incorporate rebellious detail of contemporary experience with music, drugs and the concerns and language of the street." When promoting a symposium to Olds in September 2019, the University of Otago published [that] "Peter Olds' writing has been important to poets and other readers of New Zealand poetry since the 1970s, bringing to the centre of attention the unidentified, unclaimed, the marginal, the dispossessed, the trespasser, but also the exuberant, the childish, the lively and the conversational."

David Eggleton has said of him as a poet:

Olds is a master of laconic comedy, offering us delicate absurdist perceptions robustly expressed: childhood winter mornings in an antiquated Christchurch, a portrait of his father as 'a clergyman sitting up in bed ... rolling a racehorse cigarette', a glancing view of a dog described as ' a walking/ chucked-out bargain-basement carpet'...Olds weaves a consciousness of the moment into a personal mythography.

== Influences on his work ==
Influences on his poetry include American rock'n'roll, the 1950s beat poetry of Allen Ginsberg and Jack Kerouac, and many aspects from the counter-culture of the time such as drugs, sex and depression are regular themes, particularly in his early poetry. The Poet Laureate, David Eggleton argued that Olds' personal vision in his poems is reflected in "life, death, greed, humanity, poverty, gentrification, Methodism, bees, love, spirituality, medication, buses, trains, clapped-out pre-War Fords, and an immaculately restored white Oldsmobile Convertible with pink vinyl hood...echoing Jack Kerouac's On the Road...the beat generation, reaching New Zealand and its 1950s bodgies and widgies, and reaching Peter Olds, too, as he recalled in his 2012 jukebox poem 'Love Me Do/1963'."

A friendship with James K. Baxter influenced what has been called the romantic tendency toward "reflective narratives of circumstantial personal experience" in his poetry. Being the son of a Methodist minister, Olds also shared a religious background with Baxter and one commentator has noted that it is "easy to see how such early influences could lead the young Olds to identify with the vatic power of language and poetry’s associated mystique...[and see]... Baxter as a liberating example of the poet-seer’s defiant non-conformity." Victor Billot has said of an early interaction with Baxter, that "a bearded poet-shaman with burning eyes staring at you on a street corner in Dunedin … asking [Olds] to join him on God’s instruction at a backwoods commune" was likely to have made a big impact on the young poet at that time in his life.

When his poem At Murdering Beach was published, Olds shared one aspect of his inspiration:

I love to go to places of interest where people once lived in pre-European times. I like to imagine what it was like for those who had only a bone and stone technology between themselves and extinction. In the year 2000 & something, Murdering Beach (Whareakeake) is not a bad place for a picnic and a swim. Some surfers find good swells out among the black rocks beyond the cliffs at the ends of the beach.

== Community recognition ==
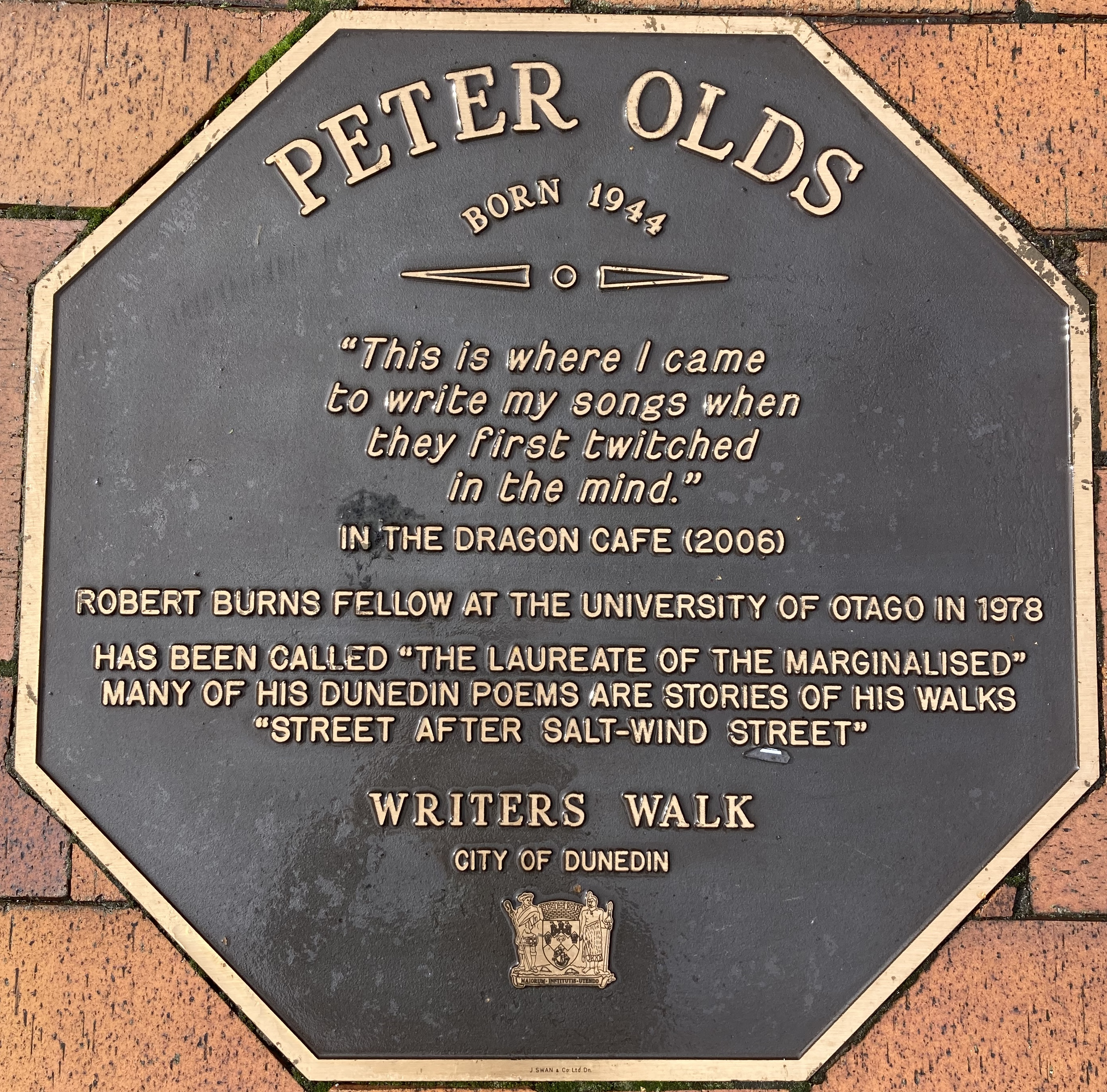
Peter Olds writers' walk plaque

When the Dunedin City Council published A Town trod by Poets (2020), to celebrate the city being designated as a UNESCO Creative City of Literature, Olds said he had "always wanted to be a photographer...I love the visual in poetry — this [book] was a great opportunity to marry the two." Dunedin City of Literature director Nicky Page described Olds' images as "brilliant, noting that he had "subsequently offered some of his personal photographs for this exciting project, and his magnificent series of local graffiti images will be a source of nostalgia for one generation and intrigue for another."

In recognition of his contribution to local literature, Olds' name was added to the Dunedin Writers' Walk with an official plaque unveiled on Friday 18 February 2022. The Mayor of Dunedin Aaron Hawkins, said the walk through the Octagon was an "ever-present reminder of why the city had been designated by Unesco as a City of Literature." Roger Hickin, a publisher who had a long association with Olds, described him as Dunedin's "unofficial poet laureate", noting that the award was a long-overdue acknowledgement of poems which were often vivid and authentic stories that captured what happened on the streets.

== Death ==
Olds died on 31 August 2023, aged 79.

== Awards ==
- Olds held the Robert Burns Fellowship in 1978.
- A work by Olds, Disjointed on Wellington Railway Station was selected for Best New Zealand Poems 2001.
- In 2005 Olds was the first recipient of the Janet Frame Literary Trust Award for Poetry.
