= Helen Rickerby =

New Zealand poet, writer, editor and publisher

Helen Rickerby is a New Zealand poet, writer, editor and publisher. In 2020, she won the Mary and Peter Biggs poetry prize at the Ockham New Zealand Book Awards.

In 1995, she was part of the group that founded JAAM literary journal. From 2005 to 2015 she was co-managing editor, with Clare Needham, of the journal. Since 2004, Rickerby has run Seraph Press, a small publishing company based in Wellington, New Zealand.

== Publications ==
- Rickerby, H.,(2014). Words that matter: 10 years of Seraph Press. Wellington, NZ: Seraph Press.
- Rickerby, H. (2014). Cinema. Wellington, NZ: Mākaro Press.
- Rickerby, H., (2010). Heading north. Dunedin, N.Z.: Kilmog Press.
- Rickerby, H. (2008). My iron spine. Wellington, N.Z: HeadworX.
