= Hinemoana Baker =

New Zealand writer and musician

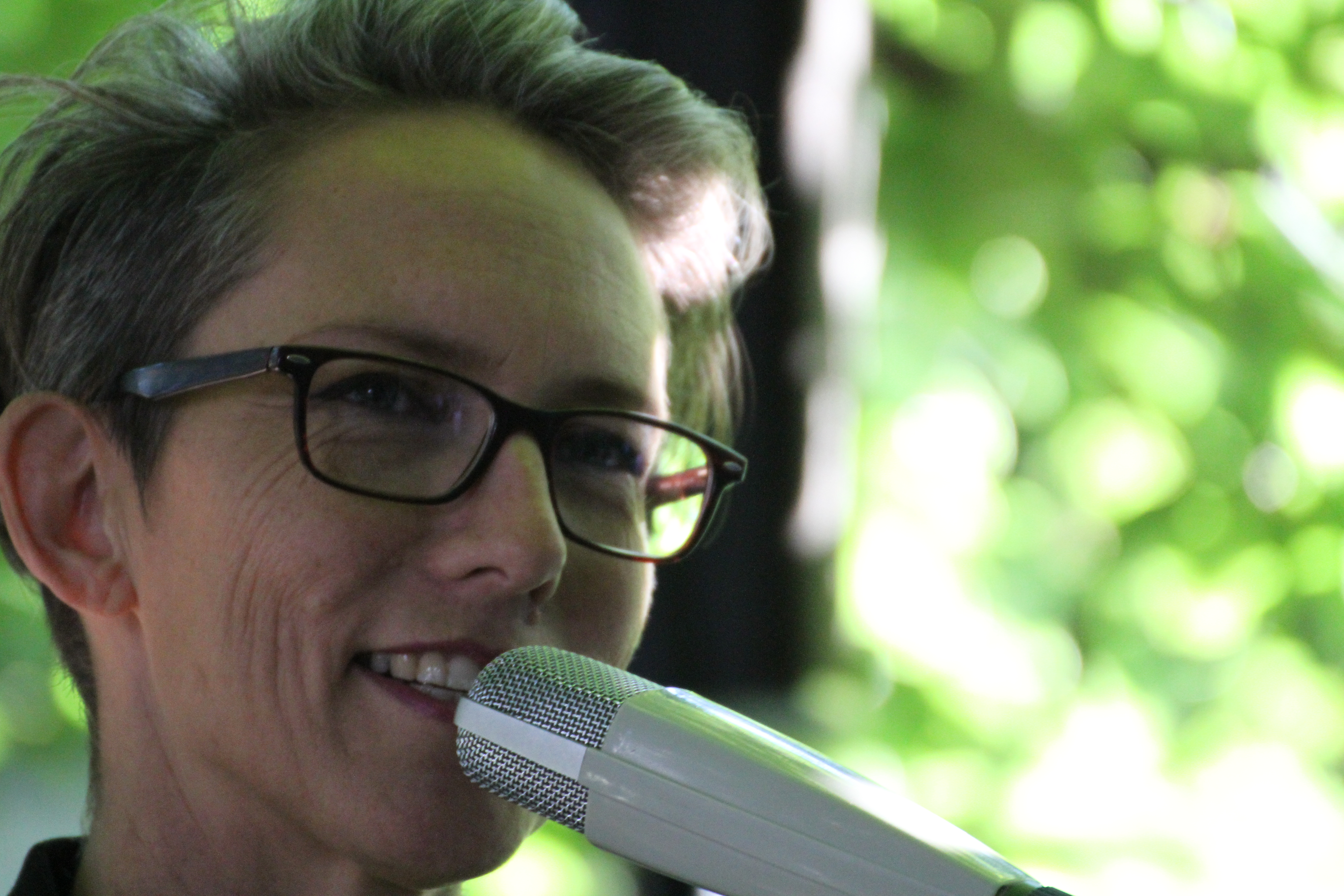
- Baker in 2016
- Born: 1968 (age 57–58); Christchurch, New Zealand
- Education: MA in creative writing, Victoria University of Wellington
- Occupations: Poet; musician; teacher; broadcaster
- Relatives: Val Baker (father)
- Website: www.hinemoana.co.nz

Hinemoana Baker (born 1968) is a New Zealand poet, musician and recording artist, teacher of creative writing and broadcaster.

== Biography ==
Baker was born in Christchurch in 1968 and grew up in Whakatāne and Nelson. She descends from the Ngāi Tahu tribe in the South Island of New Zealand, and from Ngāti Raukawa, Ngāti Toa and Te Āti Awa in the North Island. She also has English and German (Bavarian) heritage. Baker is queer and takatāpui.

As of 2021 she is living in Germany, after completing 12 months as Creative New Zealand's Berlin Writer in Residence in 2016. She was chosen as the New Zealand Randell Cottage Writing Fellow for 2024.

Baker holds an MA in creative writing from the International Institute of Modern Letters at Victoria University of Wellington.

== Career ==
Baker's writing has been published in a number of journals and anthologies. Her works include the poetry collections mātuhi | needle (2004), kōiwi kōiwi | bone bone (2010), waha | mouth (2014) and funkhaus (2020).

As a musician she has recorded albums of original music. Her first album, puāwai (2004), was a finalist for the New Zealand Music Awards and the APRA Silver Scrolls Māori Language award. Bas has co-edited the anthology Kaupapa: New Zealand Poets, World Issues in 2007 and the 4th Floor online literary journal of Whitireia Polytechnic in 2008. She is one of six German and New Zealand poets to contribute to a collection Transit of Venus, published by Victoria University Press in 2016.

Baker has written two plays which were presented in Taki Rua Theatre's Te Reo Māori Season. Māua Tāua, (produced in 1995) and Pūkeko Tuawhā.

In addition to her Creative New Zealand residency in Berlin, Baker was Arts Queensland Poet in Residence in 2009 and writer in residence with the International Writing Programme at the University of Iowa in 2010. She spent 2014 as writer in residence at the International Institute of Modern Letters, Victoria University. She has appeared at festivals and events in New Zealand and in Australia, Indonesia, Europe and the US.

Funkhaus was shortlisted for the Mary and Peter Biggs Award for Poetry at the 2021 Ockham New Zealand Book Awards.
