= Iain Sharp =

New Zealand poet (1953–2026)

- Sharp in 2004
- Born: Iain James Sharp; 24 April 1953; Glasgow, Scotland
- Died: 24 January 2026 (aged 72)
- Occupations: Poet; librarian; journalist

Academic background
- Education: University of Auckland
- Thesis: Wit at several weapons: a critical edition (1982)

Iain James Sharp (24 April 1953 – 24 January 2026) was a New Zealand poet and critic.

== Life and career ==
Born in Glasgow, Scotland on 24 April 1953, Sharp emigrated with his family to New Zealand in 1961, where they settled in Auckland. He studied at the University of Auckland where he received a doctorate in English in 1982. His doctoral thesis was titled Wit at several weapons: a critical edition. Soon after completing his PhD, he qualified as a librarian from the New Zealand Library School.

Sharp worked part-time in the Special Collections Department of Auckland Central City Library, and was also a reviewer, critic and columnist for the Sunday Star-Times for many years and also books editor for Metro magazine. Sharp was also a literary editor for Landfall and Rambling Jack and involved in the Auckland literary and arts journal Printout in the 1990s.

Sharp retired to Nelson and died on 24 January 2026.

== Works ==
- Why Mammals Shiver, Auckland: One Eyed Press, 1981
- She Is Trying to Kidnap the Blind Person, Auckland: Hard Echo Press, 1985
- The Pierrot Variations, Auckland: Hard Echo Press, 1985
- Two Poets: Selections from the Work of Suzanne Chapman and Iain Sharp, edited by Suzanne Chapman (writer), Auckland: Auckland English Association, 1985
- The Singing Harp, Paekakariki: Earl of Seacliff Art Workshop, 2004
- Mahones: Four Poets (with Bill Dacker, Michael O'Leary and Mark Pirie), Paekakariki: Earl of Seacliff Art Workshop, 2005
- Real Gold: treasures of Auckland City Libraries, text by Iain Sharp; photographs by Haruhiko Sameshima, Auckland University Press, 2007
- Our Favourite Poems: New Zealanders choose their best-loved poems, introduction by Iain Sharp, Craig Potton Publishing, 2007, ISBN 9781877333682
- Heaphy: Explorer, Artist, Settler, Auckland University Press, 2008
- Sharing Our Ghosts, Poems by Joy MacKenzie & Iain Sharp, Auckland: Cumberland Press, 2011
