= John Dennison =

New Zealand poet (born 1978)

John Sebastian Dennison (born 28 May 1978) is a New Zealand poet, as well as a poetry scholar who has published on the poetry of New Zealand poet James K. Baxter.

== Poetry ==
Dennison began performing poetry in Dunedin, New Zealand, during his time there in 2003–2007. He performed his distinct yet Baxteresque performance poetry at all of the local poetry performance venues: the Arc Café, the Port Chalmers Hotel (The Tunnel), and the Dunedin Public Library. While preferring the orality of performance, a few poems were published in student magazine, The Critic. His poems frequently interlace the gravity of biblical imagery with the banalities of modern existence, forcing their confrontation and overcoming any simple binary interpretations. This is evident in his poems, Retail Therapy and Fool's Repair.

== Poetry criticism ==
In "Ko te Pakeha te teina: Baxter's cross-cultural poetry", Dennison explores "the potential of Baxter's engagement to inform a radical understanding of Pakeha identity"—the theme of Dennison's Master of Arts dissertation at the University of Victoria, Wellington, New Zealand. Dennison seeks to overcome the interpretation of Baxter's engagement with te ao Māori in terms of a simplistic dichotomy between Māori and Pākehā; spiritual and rational; pre-modern and modern. In Baxter's later poetry, Dennison finds that Baxter's use of te ao Māori is not for the purposes of setting up an opposition to Pākehā culture, nor is it a simple model for Pākehā culture to emulate, but it functions to inspire a rethinking of what it is to be Pākehā. Instead of being defined by opposition or assimilation, Dennison's thesis is that Baxter was suggesting a reconfiguration of Pākehā identity, one shaped by the tuakana-teina (elder brother-younger brother) familial relationship.

== Doctoral research ==
In April 2007, Dennison was awarded the highest value scholarship from the New Zealand Tertiary Education Commission. The scholarships awarded by the New Zealand Government were embroiled in controversy, when Opposition MPs criticised the award of $96,000 for the study of bogans. Dennison's scholarship was awarded to fund his doctoral research at St Andrews University, Scotland, looking at the ways in which Heaney's poetry addresses political conflict in Northern Ireland. Dennison's research is for the purpose of considering Seamus Heaney's poetry and its social implications.

== Publication of 'Otherwise' ==
In 2015, Dennison published his first volume of poetry, 'Otherwise'. It was published simultaneously by Carcanet in the United Kingdom and Auckland University Press in New Zealand. Noted New Zealand poet and critic, Vincent O'Sullivan, said of the poems that "they remind you, as good poetry does, that fashion and easy assumptions are drab stuff in the face of the real thing". With help from Creative New Zealand, Dennison toured the United Kingdom in March 2015 to promote 'Otherwise', which included a joint poetry reading with former Archbishop Rowan Williams.
