= George Wood =

George Wood may refer to:

== Military ==
- George Adam Wood (1767–1831), British Army officer of the Napoleonic Era
- George Wood (British Army officer) (1898–1982), during World War II
- Pseudonym for Fritz Kolbe (1900–1971), German spy for the U.S. during World War II

== Politics ==
- George Wood (died 1558), MP for Flintshire
- George Wood (judge) (1743–1824), English lawyer and politician
- George William Wood (1781–1843), English businessman and MP
- George Tyler Wood (1795–1858), governor of Texas
- George W. Wood (1808–1871), American politician
- George Wood (Canadian politician) (1888–1966), member of parliament, Brant, Ontario
- George Wood (New Zealand politician) (born 1946), former mayor of North Shore City, Auckland, New Zealand
- George Pierce Wood (1895–1945), member of the Florida House of Representatives

== Religion ==
- George Ingersoll Wood (1814–1899), American clergyman
- George O. Wood (1941–2022), general superintendent of the Assemblies of God
- George Warren Wood (1814–1901), Presbyterian minister and missionary
- George Warren Wood Jr (1844–1924), his son, Presbyterian missionary

== Sports ==
- George Wood (baseball) (1858–1924), left fielder in Major League Baseball, 1880–1892
- George Wood (Somerset cricketer) (1865–1948), first-class cricketer who played three matches in 1893 and 1894
- George Wood (Yorkshire cricketer) (1862–1948), first-class cricketer who played two matches for Yorkshire
- George Wood (cricketer, born 1893) (1893–1971), English cricketer
- George Wood (footballer) (born 1952), Scottish footballer
- George Wood (gymnast) (born 1999), British acrobatic gymnast

== Other ==
- George Bacon Wood (1797–1879), American physician and writer
- George Arnold Wood (1865–1928), Australian historian
- George Herbert Wood (1867–1949), Canadian businessman who co-founded Wood Gundy and Company
- George Henry Wood (statistician) (1874–1945), English statistician
- Wee Georgie Wood (1894–1979), stage name of George Wood Bamlett, English actor
- George Wood (New Zealand statistician) (1900–1978), New Zealand economist, statistician and consumer advocate
- G. Wood (1919–2000), American actor
- George Wood (actor) (born 1981), English actor
- George Wood (Radio Sweden) (born 1949), American journalist
- George Henry Wood (railway director) (1836–?), director of the Isle of Man Railway
- George Wood, founder of Wawa Food Markets

== See also ==
- George Woods (disambiguation)
