= Phil Kawana =

New Zealand Māori writer and poet (born 1965)

Phillip 'Phil' Graham Kawana (born 1965) is a New Zealand poet and short story writer. His writing primarily depicts Māori characters and their struggles, and concerns ideas of race, social class, colonial legacies, identity and youth culture.

== Early life ==
Kawana was born in 1965 in Hāwera, Taranaki, New Zealand. He is of Māori, English and Scottish descent, and identifies with the Ngāruahine, Ngāti Ruanui and Ngāti Kahungunu iwi. From a young age, Kawana was an avid reader and displayed an interesting in writing, having his first poetry published in a local newspaper at the age of eight. This interest was partially inspired by New Zealand fiction writer Ronald Hugh Morrieson, who was a friend of Kawana's family.

== Career ==
Kawana did not begin his writing career until his late 20s, previously working a series of odd jobs. He began by publishing his poetry and short fiction in a number of periodicals and anthologies including Sport 14 and Kapiti Poems 7, with some of his poetry and prose being broadcast on radio. These works began to attract critical attention, and he achieved critical acclaim in 1995 at the inaugural Huia Short Story Awards, where he won the Te Kaunihera Māori Award for best short story in English by a previously published Māori writer. He won the same category in 1997 and also received a Creative New Zealand grant in recognition of his work. In 1999, Kawana was appointed as judge at the Huia Short Story Awards.

In 1996, Kawana published his first short story collection Dead Jazz Guys which contains 14 short stories that depicted the experiences of young New Zealand Māori and explored themes of class, race and identity. The collection explores urban Māori estrangement from their cultural identity after being separated from their ancestral lands. The collection was well received and was praised in The New Zealand Herald. Kawana published a second collection of short stories and poetry in 1999 titled Attack of the Skunk People. In 2005, Kawana published his first solo poetry collection The Devil in My Shoes. Similar to his earlier writings, The Devil in My Shoes explores the experiences of contemporary Māori. For this collection, Kawana draws on his own life experiences of growing up in the Taranaki and experiences with the racial bigotry of Pakeha locals.

Kawana has been active in the New Zealand literary world, with his fiction appearing on New Zealand national radio and at numerous literary festivals. His short fiction 'Redemption', from Dead Jazz Guys was adapted into a short film by screenwriter Timothy Balme and director Katie Wolfe. The film debuted at the New Zealand International Film Festival in September 2010 and was later shown at prestigious international film festivals including Sundance, Telluride, and the New York Film Festival, ultimately winning the Saint Tropez Antipodes Film Festival's award for Best Short Film. Kawana's work has been published in multiple anthologies, including the prizewinning Whetu Moana: Contemporary Polynesian Poems in English (2003) and Mauri Ola: Contemporary Polynesian Poems in English (2010), both edited by Albert Wendt, Reina Whaitiri and Robert Sullivan.
