= Vernice Wineera =

New Zealand Hawaiian poet and editor

- Born: 1 December 1938; Wellington, New Zealand
- Died: 31 July 2024 (aged 85); Honolulu, Hawaii
- Education: University of Hawaiʻi (PhD)
- Occupations: Poet; editor; educator
- Spouse: Baden Pere (died 2012)
- Children: 7
- Writing career
- Pen name: Vernice Wineera Pere

Academic background
- Thesis: Selves and others: A study of reflexivity and the representation of culture in touristic display at the Polynesian cultural center, Laie, Hawaii (2000)

Vernice Wineera Pere (1 December 1938 – 31 July 2024) was a New Zealand Hawaiian poet, editor and educator. Wineera lived in Hawaii from 1960, and served as vice-president of the Polynesian Cultural Center from 1980 to 1992 and as director of the Pacific Institute at Brigham Young University–Hawaii (where she also taught creative writing and Pacific studies) from 1992 to 2008. In 1978 she was the first Māori woman to publish a poetry collection.

== Early life, education and family ==
Wineera was born in Wellington in 1938, and grew up at Takapūwāhia. She had Māori, English and French ancestors, and was of Ngāti Toa and Ngāti Raukawa descent.

In 1960 Wineera emigrated to Lāʻie, Hawaii with her husband Baden Pere, due to his work and their membership in the Church of Jesus Christ of Latter-day Saints. Wineera and Pere (who died in 2012) had seven children together.

In 1977 she graduated with a Bachelor of Arts in English from Brigham Young University–Hawaii (BYU–Hawaii). In 1994 she graduated with a master's degree in arts from the University of Hawaiʻi, followed by earning her PhD in American studies in 2000.

== Career ==
In 1978 Wineera was the first Māori woman to publish a book of poetry, with Mahanga: Pacific Poems. Alice Te Punga Somerville describes the collection as "packed full of rich, lively, compelling poetry", and notes that the collection places her (along with Evelyn Patuawa-Nathan) "in the rather small group of nonwhite women poets anywhere who enjoyed single-author publication before the 1980s". Wineera herself said of her work:

My maoritanga and my Polynesian heritage is the vital element in my work. I see the Pacific as an extended marae that is rich in culture and I try to express this in poetry and art that reveals the universals in human experience.

In 1980 Wineera won first prize in the poetry section of the South Pacific Festival of Arts literary competition for Mahanga. At this time she was working as a cultural researcher and writer at the Polynesian Cultural Center; she served as vice-president of the center from 1980 to 1992. In 1979 she edited the anthology Ka Poʻe o Laʻie, which collected poetry by Lāʻie people.

From 1978 to 1980 and from 1992 to 2008 she taught creative writing and Pacific studies at BYU–Hawaii and edited the university's magazine. She was also the director of the university's Pacific Institute from 1992 to 2008.

Wineera's work was included in the anthologies Into the World of Light (1982, edited by Witi Ihimaera and Don Long), volume 3 of Te Ao Mārama (1993, edited by Ihimaera), Mauri Ola: Contemporary Polynesian Poems in English (2010, edited by Albert Wendt, Reina Whaitiri and Robert Sullivan), Puna Wai Korero: An Anthology of Maori Poetry in English (2014, edited by Sullivan and Whaitiri) and Wild Honey: Reading New Zealand Women's Poetry (2019, edited by Paula Green). She has had poetry published in New Zealand literary magazines Te Ao Hou and Marae.

Wineera was one of the subjects of a 2021 University of Auckland doctoral thesis by Robin Peters, titled Papatuanuku's Progeny: Foremothers of Maori Women's Poetry Written in English, about the lives and works of Māori women poets.

== Selected works ==
- Mahanga: Pacific Poems (poetry collection, BYU–Hawaii, 1978)
- Editor of Ka Poʻe o Laʻie (anthology, Polynesian Cultural Center, 1979)
- Into the Luminous Tide: Pacific Poems (poetry collection, BYU–Hawaii, 2009)
