= Audrey Brown-Pereira =

Cook Islands diplomat and poet

Audrey Teuki Tetupuariki Tuioti Brown-Pereira (born 1975) is a Cook Islands diplomat, public servant, and poet, of Cook Islands, Maori and Samoan descent.

== Biography ==
Brown-Pereira was born on Rarotonga in the Cook Islands and grew up in Papatoetoe, Auckland, New Zealand. She attended the University of Auckland and completed a Bachelor of Arts degree in political studies and sociology. From 1995 to 1997 she worked for the Cook Islands Consulate General in Auckland, then moved to Rarotonga to take up a position at the Cook Islands Ministry of Foreign Affairs and Immigration. In 2000, she returned to New Zealand as First Secretary to the Cook Islands High Commission in Wellington. In 2004 she moved to Apia, Samoa, and worked at the National University of Samoa as an Executive Administrator. She moved to the United States in 2010, returning the following year to Samoa where she worked in project management. In 2014 Brown-Pereira was appointed Executive Officer at the Secretariat of the Pacific Regional Environment Programme. In 2018 she was part of the Cook Islands delegation to the 2018 United Nations Climate Change Conference.

Brown-Pereira began writing poetry in 1994. Her work has been published in journals such as Trout, and she has written for art catalogues such as Akara ki Mua (2001) and Inei Konei (1998). She has performed her poetry at the New Zealand Fringe Festival and represented the Cook Islands at the spoken word festival Poetry Parnassus in London in 2012. Her poetry is studied by postgraduate students of Pacific poetry at the University of Auckland. She also appeared in two experimental films, The Cats Are Crying (1995) and The Rainbow (1998).

Selected poetry by Brown-Pereira was included in UPU, a curation of Pacific Island writers' work which was first presented at the Silo Theatre as part of the Auckland Arts Festival in March 2020. UPU was remounted as part of the Kia Mau Festival in Wellington in June 2021.

== Works ==
- Threads of Tivaevae: Kaleidoskope of Kolours, 2002 (with Veronica Vaevae and Catherine George)
- Wendt, Albert; Whaitiri, Reina; Sullivan, Robert, eds. (September 2010). Mauri Ola: Contemporary Polynesian Poems in English. Auckland: Auckland UP. ISBN 9781869404482.
- Brown-Pereira, A. (2014). Passages in Between I(s)lands. CreateSpace Independent Publishing Platform. ISBN 978-1-5053-5862-9.
- "Local Tourist on a Bus Ride Home" and "Mixed Bag of Tropical Sweets. Sitting Outside the Hotel R & R." in Alexeyeff, Kalissa; Taylor, John (2016). Touring Pacific Cultures. Touring Pacific Cultures. ANU Press. ISBN 978-1-922144-26-3.

== Personal life ==
Brown-Pereira is married with two daughters and lives in Samoa.
