= Evelyn Patuawa-Nathan =

New Zealand poet (1933–2019)

- Born: 14 April 1933 Northland, New Zealand
- Died: 28 August 2019 (aged 86)
- Occupation: Poet
- Notable works: Opening Doors (1979)

Evelyn Patuawa-Nathan (14 April 1933 – 28 August 2019) was a New Zealand poet. Her only published poetry collection, Opening Doors (1979), made her the third Māori woman writer to publish a book.

== Life and career ==
Patuawa-Nathan was born in Northland, New Zealand, on 14 April 1933. She lived in Europe and Asia before permanently settling in Sydney, Australia, where she worked as a teacher and as a tutor in a number of women's prisons. She was of Ngāpuhi, Ngāti Hau and Ngāti Maniapoto descent.

Her first and only published work Opening Doors, a collection of poetry, was published in 1979 by Mana Publications (Suva, Fiji). Many of the poems in the collection are set in Australia or New Zealand and dealt with themes of colonisation and homecoming.

According to the blurb of Opening Doors, Patuawa-Nathan had completed a historical novel years before which Collins of London had considered publishing, however the sole manuscript of the text was lost in the mail. Patuawa-Nathan "didn't have another copy nor the staying power to stick with it." During the same period she unsuccessfully attempted to establish a Māori Writers Society with other prominent Māori writers Hone Tuwhare and Harry Dansey.

Her work has been included in several notable anthologies. In 2019 she featured in Wild Honey: Reading New Zealand Women's Poetry, edited by Paula Green. Green said of Patuawa-Nathan: "I find scant mention of her in New Zealand archives, have a single book of her poetry, and her poetic melodies cling to me. Like so many other women writers she is a puzzling gap." Her poems are also included in Puna Wai Korero: An Anthology of Maori Poetry in English (2014, edited by Robert Sullivan and Reina Whaitiri), Te Ao Marama (1992, edited by Witi Ihimaera), and Countless Signs: The New Zealand Landscape in Literature (1986, edited by Trudie McNaughton).

== Death and legacy ==
Patuawa-Nathan died on 28 August 2019. Contrary to other Māori writers of her generation such as Patricia Grace and Witi Ihimaera, her work has often been overlooked in New Zealand; Te Punga Somerville speculates that this may be because she wrote her collection while living and teaching in Sydney.

She was the third female writer of Māori origin to have a book published, following Patricia Grace, whose collection of short stories Waiariki was published in 1975 by Penguin Books, and Vernice Wineera, whose first book of poetry was published in 1978. Te Punga Somerville also notes that Patuawa-Nathan's work places her "in the rather small group of nonwhite women poets anywhere who enjoyed single-author publication before the 1980s".

She was one of the subjects of a 2021 University of Auckland doctoral thesis by Robin Peters, titled Papatuanuku's Progeny: Foremothers of Maori Women's Poetry Written in English, about the lives and works of Māori women poets. Peters was able to find 23 unpublished poems by Patuawa-Nathan, which are included in the appendix to her thesis.

== Published works ==
- Opening Doors (Mana Publications, Fiji, 1979)
