= George Woods =

George Woods may refer to:

== Government and politics ==
- George Austin Woods (1828–1905), British navy officer who served as premier of the Kingdom of Viti, 1872–1874
- George Lemuel Woods (1832–1890), American Oregon State and Utah Territory governor
- George Woods (British politician) (1886–1951), British Labour Co-operative politician, MP for Finsbury 1935–1945
- George E. Woods (1923–2007), American federal judge

== Sports ==
- George Woods (footballer) (1884–1962), Australian footballer
- George Woods (shot putter) (1943–2022), American track and field athlete
- Pinky Woods (1920–1982), American baseball player

== Other ==
- George Woods (artist) (1898–1963), New Zealand artist
- George David Woods (1901–1982), American banker and World Bank president
- George Woods (Pitt Chancellor), Chancellor of the University of Pittsburgh

== See also ==
- George Wood (disambiguation)
