= Karlo Mila =

New Zealand poet (born 1974)

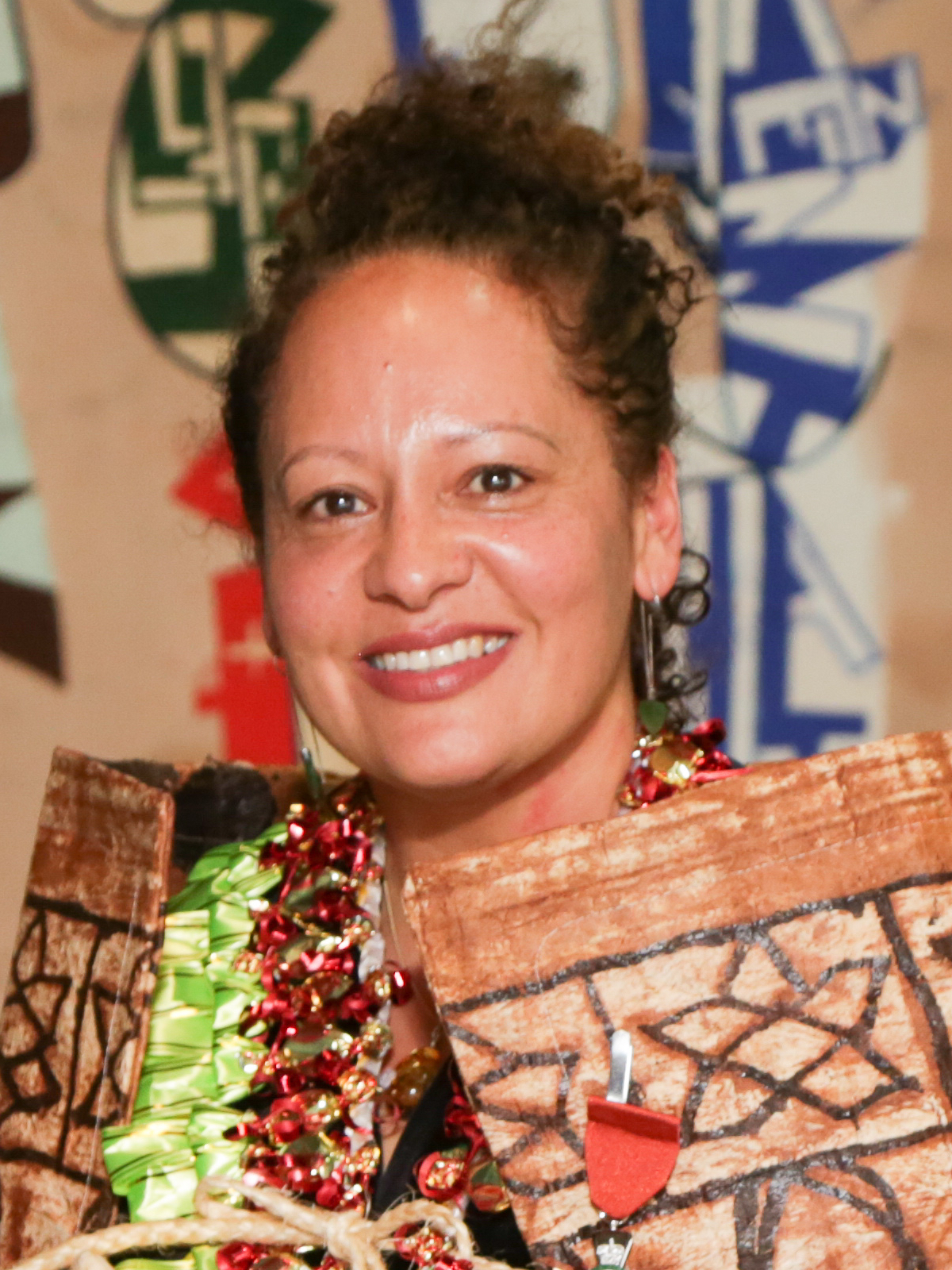
- Karlo Mila after her investiture as a Member of the New Zealand Order of Merit in 2019
- Born: 1974 (age 51–52); Rotorua, New Zealand
- Education: PhD, Massey University (2010)
- Occupation: Poet

Karlo Estelle Mila MNZM (born 1974) is a New Zealand writer and poet of Tongan, Pālagi and Samoan descent. Her first collection, Dream Fish Floating, received the NZSA Jessie Mackay Award for Best First Book of Poetry in 2006 at the Montana New Zealand Book Awards. She has subsequently published two further poetry collections, A Well Written Body (2008) and Goddess Muscle (2020), the latter of which was longlisted for the Mary and Peter Biggs Award for Poetry.

== Early life ==
Mila is the eldest of two children. Her mother is of Pālagi and Samoan heritage with ancestral ties to Pago Pago, Savaiʻi, (Samoa) and her father is from Kolo fo'ou and 'Ofu, in Tonga. She was born in 1974 in Rotorua, New Zealand and grew up in Palmerston North. In her early years, Mila was always surrounded by books; she spent most of her time at the Palmerston North Library, where she read the entire fairytale section. During high school, she excelled in English and poetry. Although her father could not read or write, she was encouraged by her parents to make the most of the educational opportunities in New Zealand. Mila wrote her first poem at the age of eight, about seeds, while attending Highbury School in Palmerston North, and went on to win her first poetry competition. Mila also attended Tonga High School for six months in 1996 before moving back to New Zealand to complete her studies.

== Biography ==
Mila began her tertiary studies at Massey University in 1995, where she completed her BA in Anthropology (Sociology), Masters in Social Work. Mila subsequently moved back to Tonga for a period where she taught at Halafo'ou National Form Seven School. Prior to publishing her first poetry works, Mila worked as a trade unionist and the manager of Pacific Health Research at HRC (Health Research Council of New Zealand) from 2000 to 2003.

Her first award was the NZSA Jessie Mackay Award for Best First Book of Poetry at the 2006 Montana New Zealand Book Awards, for Dream Fish Floating. She then went on to contribute to anthologies such as Whetu Moana (Auckland University Press, 2002), Niu Voices (Huia Publishers, 2006), and Short Fuse: The Global Anthology of New Fusion Poetry (Rattapallax Press, 2002). Her second poetry collection, A Well Written Body (Huia, 2008), was a collaboration with German-born artist Delicia Sampero. In 2010, Mila graduated with a PhD in Philosophy (Sociology). Her thesis, Polycultural capital and the Pasifika second generation: Negotiating identities in diasporic spaces, explored how young people of the Pacific diaspora within New Zealand operate culturally and whether their cultural identities draws parallels with their wellbeing. Mila also established the Mana Moana leadership programme based on her research. As the programme director, founder and creator, the purpose of Mana Moana is to highlight and maintain ancestral Pasifika (Indigenous peoples of the Pacific) perspectives, intellect and knowledge within modern contexts.

Mila's work was described by reviewer Nicky Pellegrino as "poetry [that] speaks to the soul". Her creative style includes many references to her cultural roots including the broader Pacific, political issues, and love. She is also interested in the idea of literary Whakapapa (genealogy), dedicating entire sections to it ("Chanting Back To The Bones" and "Tuakana") in Dream Fish Floating. In 2011 the first ever Pacific literature conference in New Zealand was held in Wellington at Victoria University, where Mila was a keynote speaker alongside other widely celebrated writers in the Pacific region such as Patricia Grace, Albert Wendt and Reverend Strickson-Pua (founding member of the Polynesian Panthers). Mila was then selected as the Tongan Pavilion at the world poetry summit olympiad event at the Southbank Centre in London, in 2012.

Awarded a Fulbright scholarship in 2015, Mila had a three month residency at University of Hawai'i. During the residency she focused on two works in development: a series of poems and a novel. In 2016, she was awarded the Contemporary Pacific Art Award at the Creative New Zealand Arts Pasifka Awards. In 2019, Mila was appointed a Member of the New Zealand Order of Merit, for her contributions to the Pacific community and as a poet. Poetry by Mila was included in UPU, a curation of Pacific Island writers’ work which was first presented at the Silo Theatre as part of the Auckland Arts Festival in March 2020. UPU was remounted as part of the Kia Mau Festival in Wellington in June 2021. Her poetry also extends into her advocacy surrounding issues of climate change and women reflected in her work "Global Line Up", written in Jamaica at the climate crisis conference. This poem would later be exhibited in Glasgow among other renowned Pasifika Poets (Selina Tusitala Marsh and Audrey Brown-Pereira) at COP26. Mila has also worked as a columnist for the Dominion Post.

In 2021, Mila's poetry collection Goddess Muscle (2020) was longlisted for the Mary and Peter Biggs Award for Poetry at the Ockham New Zealand Book Awards.

== Selected works ==
=== Poetry ===
- Dream Fish Floating (Huia, 2005)
- A Well Written Body, with German-born artist Delicia Sampero (Huia, 2008)
- Goddess Muscle (Huia, 2020)

=== Anthologies ===
- Short Fuse: The Global Anthology of New Fusion Poetry (Rattapallax Press, 2002)
- Whetu Moana: Contemporary Polynesian Poems in English (Auckland University Press, 2002)
- Best New Zealand Poems (Victoria University Press, 2003, 2005 & 2006)
- Niu Voices (Huia, 2006)
- A well written body (Huia, 2008)

== Awards and honours ==
- 2006 – NZSA Jessie Mackay Award for Best First Book of Poetry in 2006 at the Montana New Zealand Book Awards
- 2016 – Contemporary Pacific Art Award Creative New Zealand Arts Pasifka Awards.
- 2019 – Appointed a Member of the New Zealand Order of Merit, for services to the Pacific community and as a poet, in the 2019 New Year Honours
