= Joan Dukes =

Joan Dukes may refer to:

- Joan Dukes (artist) (1903–1993), New Zealand artist and illustrator
- Joan Dukes (politician) (c. 1948–2020), American politician
