= New Zealand School Journal =

Periodical educational publication

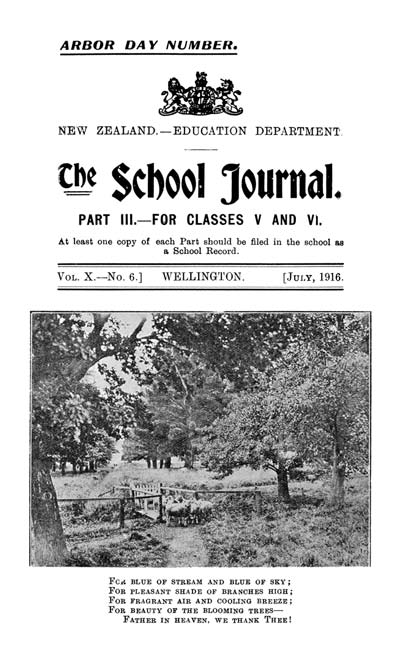
- Cover, July 1916
- Editor: Susan Paris and David Chadwick
- Categories: Educational
- Circulation: 750,000 (yearly)
- First issue: May 1907; 119 years ago
- Company: Lift Education
- Website: instructionalseries.tki.org.nz/Instructional-Series/School-Journal
- ISSN: 0111-6355
- OCLC: 173344941

The New Zealand School Journal is a periodical children's educational publication in New Zealand. Founded in 1907 by the Department of Education, it is one of the world's longest-running publications for children. Since 2013 it has been published by the private firm Lift Education. The journal's main goal since its foundation has been to educate children and improve their literacy, but it has also had an influence on the cultural life of New Zealand. In its early years the journal reflected the country's position as a dominion of the British Empire and content was largely from overseas, but since the 1940s many notable New Zealand writers and artists have contributed to the journal, with children's author Margaret Mahy describing it as "one of New Zealand's leading literary magazines". The journal included content about Māori culture from its inception, but only began to include extensive content by Māori and Pasifika writers in the latter part of the 20th century.

As of 2021 around 750,000 copies are published annually, and since 2014 the journal has also been published online in PDF form. Each issue is published in three parts corresponding to year 4 (ages 8–9), years 5–6 (ages 9–10) and years 7–8 (ages 11–13). Issues feature a mixture of stories, non-fiction articles, plays and poetry.

== History ==
=== Foundation ===
First published in May 1907, the journal is said by New Zealand's Ministry for Culture and Heritage to be the longest-running periodical publication for children in the world. The journal's development was initiated by then Inspector-General of Schools, George Hogben, on the basis that it was cheaper to produce a single free publication than to produce separate textbooks on history, geography and other subjects. An inspiration may have been the earlier The New Zealand Reader, an anthology of local literature produced in the 1890s by the Minister of Education, William Pember Reeves.

The journal was originally published by the Department of Education 10 times a year (every month except December and January), in three different parts corresponding to different age groups. Its intention was in part to provide educational material for children with a New Zealand focus, although until the 1930s it included extensive content about the British Empire which then encompassed New Zealand; for example, biographies of members of the royal family, articles about famous battles, and moralistic poems. In the early years, one issue a year would be dedicated to coverage of the Empire, with the goal of developing "an appreciation of the higher literature ... an admiration of truth and goodness in daily life, and a high conception of patriotism and national service". It also promoted colonial values, with articles about useful topics like tree-felling, house building and knowledge of New Zealand's natural environment.

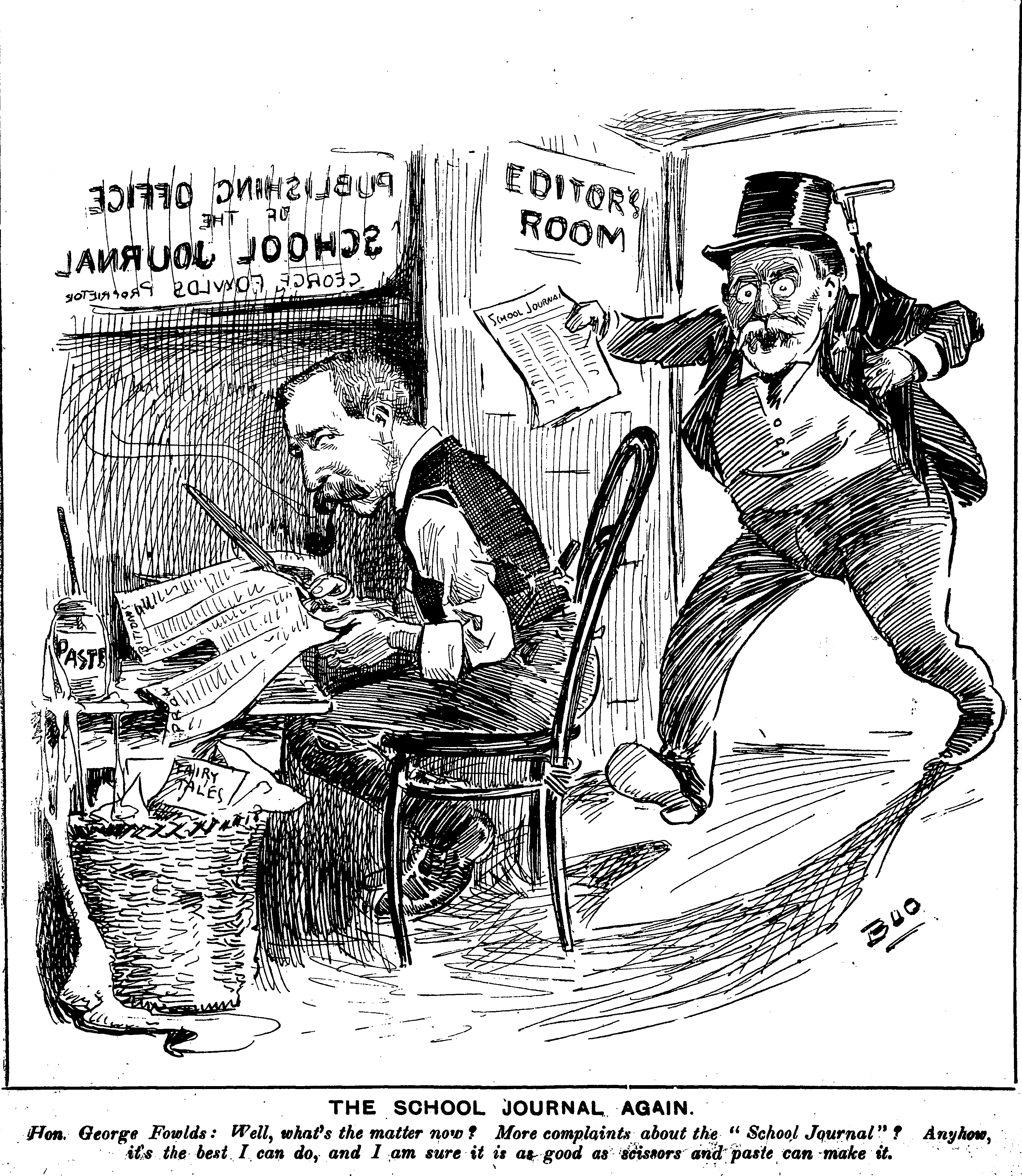
Political cartoon criticising the journal, then the responsibility of Minister of Education George Fowlds, by William Blomfield in the Observer, 23 November 1907

The first editor was W. E. Spencer, a former school inspector. The first issue, published in May 1907, began with an unattributed poem titled "The Wasp and the Bee", and also featured poetry by William Pember Reeves. It was not well-received, and was criticised by the Auckland Star as "an inexplicable mystery and a bitter disappointment", being "nothing more or less than a school reading book, of the ordinary miscellaneous character". The Manawatu Standard said that with one exception it had been unfavourably criticised by every newspaper. The New Zealand Times said that on the whole the edition "promises well, and should be welcomed heartily as a bright innovation in the literature of our public schools", although it did criticise a poem for referring to soccer as "football" when "for national reasons, it should be Rugby". In 1909, the Minister for Education George Fowlds responded to rumours that it was about to be discontinued: "It is not intended the journal should be stopped — it is an essential part of the educational system because of the large amount of varied reading matter it provides at small cost."

=== Early 20th century ===
Until the 1940s editions of the journal generally did not attribute stories and articles to a particular author, and featured an emphasis on text rather than illustration. For the first year of publication there were in fact no illustrations, with limited drawings being introduced in the second year, and until the 1940s, the majority of illustrations were obtained from overseas artists. The journal was initially delivered to individual children free of charge and only began being delivered in bulk to schools in the late 1940s. In 1914 use of the journal in state schools became compulsory. Janet Frame, one of New Zealand's best-known authors, remembered being inspired by the poetry in the journal during her childhood in the 1930s.

In October 1914, the journal published the poem If— by British author Rudyard Kipling without first asking permission. Spencer wrote to Kipling's publisher to inform them of the publication and ask of any "reasonable fee" that would be required. In response, Kipling accused the journal of breaching his copyright, advising that he had refused permission to other publications, and sought payment of 50 pounds sterling (a significant sum at the time). Spencer, backed by the Department of Education and New Zealand's Solicitor-General, refused on the basis that the New Zealand government was not bound by copyright laws. There is no record of whether a resolution was ever reached.

In its early years, the journal included regular content relating to Māori people and culture, in part because of a belief that Māori were a dying race and their culture needed to be recorded and remembered. Early articles on the Moriori people of the Chatham Islands included racist inaccuracies (for example the July 1916 edition described Moriori as lazy and unfriendly, and said that they preceded Māori people in New Zealand). In 2010 three special editions were published to correct these inaccuracies, and the New Zealand government also officially apologised for them in settlement of the Moriori Waitangi Tribunal claim. Historian Michael King said in Penguin History of New Zealand (2003) that "for hundreds of thousands of New Zealand children, the version of Moriori history carried in the School Journal and other publications which drew from that source, reinforced over 60-odd years by primary school teachers, was the one that lodged in the national imagination". In King's view, the journal was also responsible for popularising both Percy Smith's inaccurate story of Kupe and the belief that Aotearoa is the traditional Māori name for New Zealand, which King disputed.

In 1931 the existing editor departed and was replaced by a sub-editor, A M Palmer, who edited the journal until 1940 (although she was only granted the full title of editor in 1937). Under her direction the journal became less imperialist and pro-Empire, and more anti-war. In 1939 C. E. Beeby established the School Publications branch of the Department of Education, which took over responsibility for publication of the School Journal, and began encouraging more local New Zealand works. These changes led to the journal becoming known for the high quality of its children's literature. The journal's improvements corresponded with a drive in the New Zealand education system to become more interesting for children and to focus more on New Zealand history and writings. Editor and frequent contributor Jack Lasenby described the journal as being as "anarchic, vigorous and fertile as the New Zealand bush", while Margaret Mahy (whose prolific writing career begin with two stories published in the journal in 1961) described it as "one of New Zealand's leading literary magazines".

Unlike World War I, which was extensively covered in the journal in a romantic and imperialist way, there was little mention of World War II during the war years, although in March 1942 a story was featured about support provided by the Boy Scouts in Britain. After the war the journal focused more on life in New Zealand. In 1948, the iconic book-length Life at the Pa was published, written by Ray Chapman-Taylor and illustrated by E. Mervyn Taylor and Russell Clark. It told the story of a Māori boy growing up in a traditional pre-European settlement. In 1949, a series of stories by author Brian Sutton-Smith caused controversy, featuring a "gang" of young boys who engaged in what was then considered anti-social behaviour (such as attempting to sneak into a movie theatre without paying for a ticket). The Taranaki Daily News and other media outlets successfully campaigned for the series to be cancelled and it was discontinued after three of the planned ten stories.

=== Later 20th century ===
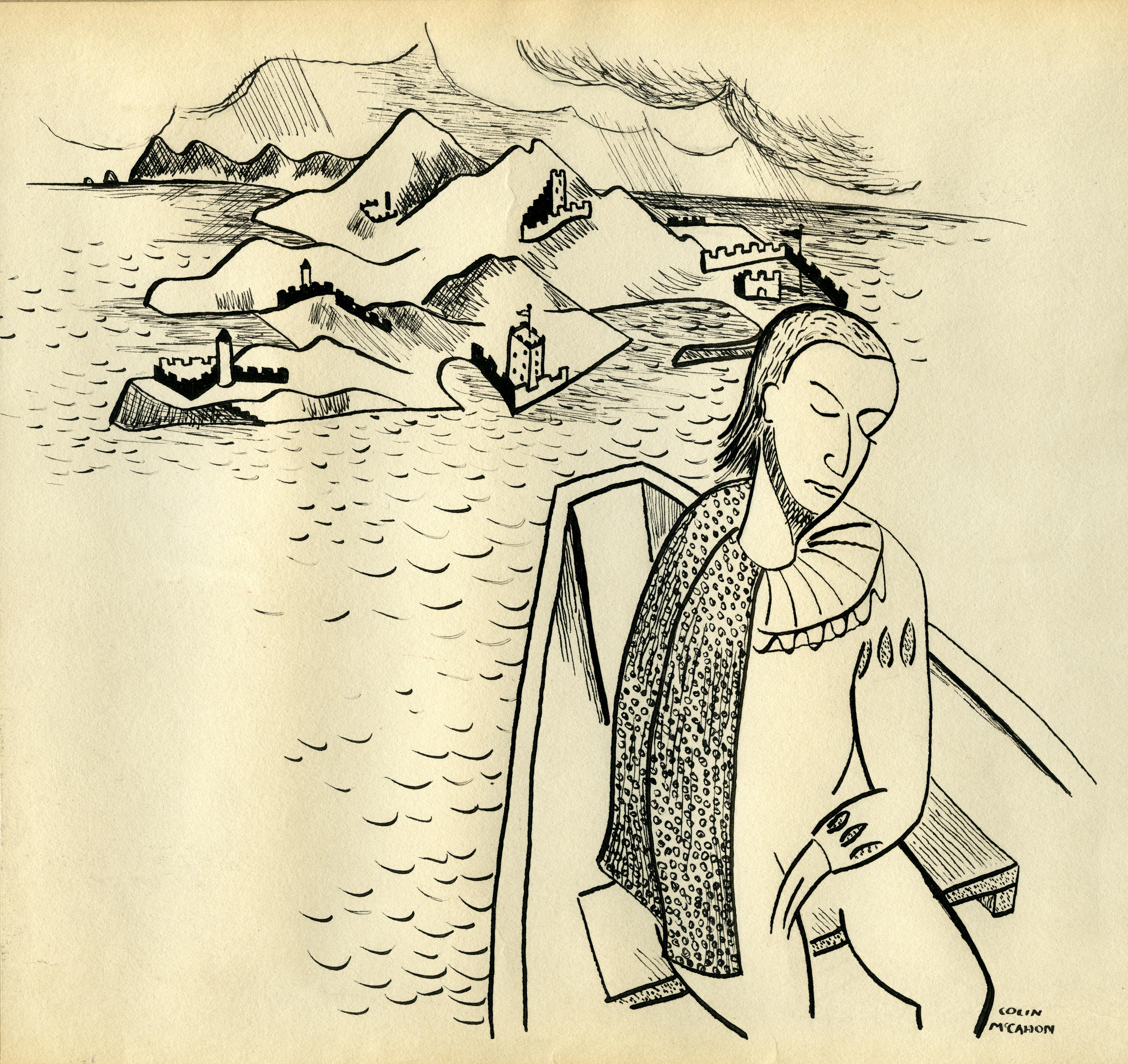
Illustration by Colin McCahon for the journal, c. 1940s

The journal's use of art evolved over time, with coloured covers and photographs being introduced in the 1950s and the use of colour and illustration becoming bolder in the 1960s and onwards, as colour printing became more accessible. Jill McDonald, art editor in the 1960s, said if books "look entertaining, or exciting, or amusing enough to be worth the effort of reading them, children will make the effort". In the 1940s and 1950s in particular the journal was linked with artists at the forefront of New Zealand art, such as Colin McCahon and Rita Angus. The journal was often an important source of income for New Zealand artists and writers. Bob Kerr, an illustrator, has noted that the journal enabled illustrators "to learn their craft", by "providing paying work".

In 1954, the journal shifted from monthly (except December and January) publication to quarterly for older age groups and bimonthly for younger age groups. In 1955, Edmund Hillary wrote an account of his summit of Mount Everest for the journal. In 1957, UNESCO published a report on New Zealand's establishment of the School Publications Branch, praising it as a "particularly interesting solution" to the challenges of educational publishing; it was explained that the intention of the journal was to be a "children's magazine of the highest quality, one which they will turn to with pleasure, and from which they will derive a taste for literature and a lasting interest in books". New Zealand historian John Beaglehole wrote in an essay in the 1950s that the journal was world-leading, not only in providing reading material for New Zealand children but in teaching them:

... that life in New Zealand can be a worthwhile and interesting experience, that New Zealand has a tradition and contemporary ways of living of its own; that New Zealanders are doing fascinating and important things here and now, that can best be written about and drawn by New Zealanders.

Alistair Te Ariki Campbell worked as an editor of the journal between 1955 and 1972, and was active in increasing the quality and quantity of Māori literature. In 1960 he published a special issue of the journal focusing on the needs and interests of Māori schoolchildren. New contributors in this period included Witi Ihimaera and Patricia Grace, Māori writers who had grown up reading the journal as children and had noticed the lack of works by Māori about Māori. The journal began featuring not just stories and articles about Māori traditions like flax-weaving but also stories about contemporary Māori children in cities and urban environments. In 1961 the journal featured the story "Fishing" by Samoan writer Albert Wendt, but it was not until the 1980s or 1990s that Pasifika writers became more widely featured.

== 1989 merger and later changes ==
In 1989 the School Publications Branch merged with the Audio and Visual Production units of the former Department of Education to form a new group called Learning Media, part of New Zealand's new Ministry of Education, which became a Crown-owned company in 1993 and a state-owned enterprise in 2005. In 1994 issues generally comprised 40–55% stories, 15–20% non-fiction articles, 15–20% plays and 5–10% poetry. Learning Media had a special Māori publishing department which produced some journal series in te reo Māori.

In 2007, in honour of the journal's centenary, Gregory O'Brien published the book A Nest of Singing Birds: 100 years of the New Zealand School Journal. A copy was sent to every school in New Zealand, and a two-month exhibition was hosted under the same title at the National Library Gallery in Wellington. The book won the award for Reference and Anthology at the 2008 Montana New Zealand Book Awards. Arts historian Athol McCredie is quoted in the book as saying:

For generations of New Zealanders, the stories and appearance of the School Journal have been an element of their cultural consciousness — remembered as evocatively as the smell of stale school milk, the feel of chalk and finger paint, and the steamy atmosphere of a classroom of wet bodies on a rainy day.

After Learning Media closed down in 2013, there were concerns that the journal would also be discontinued or that its publication would be moved overseas; member of Parliament Catherine Delahunty said that closure would be "a tragedy for generations of Kiwis who have grown up reading the school journal". However, publication was taken over by Lift Education, a private New Zealand publishing firm. In 2014, the journal was made available in online PDF form as well as in hard copy, and workshops were held to encourage new Māori and Pasifika writers and illustrators. As of 2021 around 750,000 copies are published annually. Each issue is published in three parts corresponding to year 4 (ages 8–9), years 5–6 (ages 9–10) and years 7–8 (ages 11–13).

Areas of focus for the journal in the 21st century have included Māori culture and language, children's wellbeing, and respect for New Zealand's natural environment. In 2018 a special School Journal comic book about the Treaty of Waitangi, written by Ross Calman and Mark Derby, and illustrated by Toby Morris, was published and distributed to New Zealand schools and made available online.

== Notable contributors ==
=== Writers ===
- Fleur Adcock (poet and non-fiction writer)
- Amelia Batistich (fiction and non-fiction writer)
- James K Baxter (poet and editor from 1956 to 1963)
- Peter Bland (poet)
- Jenny Bornholdt (poet)
- Bub Bridger (poet and fiction writer)
- Alistair Te Ariki Campbell (fiction writer and editor from 1955 to 1972)
- Catherine Chidgey (fiction writer)
- Glenn Colquhoun (poet)
- Joy Cowley (fiction writer)
- Ruth Dallas (fiction writer)
- Basil Dowling (poet)
- Alison Drummond (non-fiction writer)
- Marilyn Duckworth (fiction writer)
- Eileen Duggan (poet)
- Maurice Duggan (fiction writer)
- Beverley Dunlop (fiction writer)
- Lauris Edmond (poet)
- Roderick David Finlayson (historian and writer about Māori life)
- Janet Frame (fiction writer)
- Ruth France (poet and fiction writer)
- Denis Glover (poet)
- Patricia Grace (fiction writer)
- Roger Hall (playwright and editor in the 1970s)
- David Hill (fiction writer)
- Ingrid Horrocks (non-fiction writer)
- Sam Hunt (poet)
- Witi Ihimaera (fiction writer)
- M. K. Joseph (non-fiction writer and poet)
- Louis Johnson (poet, fiction writer and editor, late 1950s)
- Hone Kouka (playwright)
- Jack Lasenby (fiction writer and editor from 1969 to 1972)
- Elsie Locke (fiction and non-fiction writer)
- Margaret Mahy (fiction writer and poet)
- Janice Marriott (fiction writer and playwright)
- Diana Noonan (editor in the 1990s)
- Margaret Orbell (writer about Māori legends and art)
- Ruth Park (fiction writer)
- Jenny Pattrick (fiction writer)
- Vivienne Plumb (fiction writer)
- Elizabeth Pulford (poet and fiction writer)
- Ruth Ross (historian)
- Frank Sargeson (fiction and non-fiction writer)
- Helen Shaw (poet and fiction writer, who also illustrated her stories)
- Elizabeth Smither (poet and fiction writer)
- Brian Sutton-Smith (fiction writer)
- Apirana Taylor (fiction writer)
- Albert Wendt (fiction writer)
- Lani Wendt Young (fiction writer)
- Mona Williams (fiction writer)

=== Artists ===
- Rita Angus (illustrator)
- Reweti Arapere (Māori contemporary artist)
- Gavin Bishop (illustrator)
- Nancy Bolton (illustrator)
- Bob Brockie (political cartoonist)
- Russell Clark (illustrator and unofficial art editor in the 1940s)
- Roy Cowan (arts editor from 1949 to 1959, also writer and illustrator)
- Joan Dukes (illustrator, also contributed writing)
- Robert Ellis (illustrator)
- Marti Friedlander (photographer)
- Dick Frizzell (illustrator)
- Anne Hamblett (illustrator)
- Louise Henderson (illustrator)
- Ralph Hotere (illustrator)
- Robyn Kahukiwa (illustrator)
- Bob Kerr (illustrator)
- Doris Lusk (illustrator)
- Molly Macalister (illustrator)
- Paratene Matchitt (traditional Māori artist)
- Eileen Mayo (illustrator)
- Colin McCahon (illustrator)
- Jill McDonald (arts editor, mid-1960s)
- Toby Morris (illustrator)
- Robin Morrison (photographer)
- John Pascoe (photographer)
- Graham Percy (illustrator)
- Juliet Peter (illustrator)
- May Smith (illustrator)
- Michael Smither (illustrator)
- Bill Sutton (illustrator)
- E. Mervyn Taylor (engraver and illustrator)
- Ans Westra (photographer)
- Lois White (illustrator)
- Cliff Whiting (illustrator)
- George Woods (llustrator)

== Bibliography ==
- Malone, E.P. (1973). "The New Zealand School Journal and the Imperial Ideology" (PDF). New Zealand Journal of History. 7 (1): 12–27.
- O'Brien, Gregory (2007). A Nest of Singing Birds: 100 Years of the New Zealand School Journal. Wellington: Learning Media. ISBN 978-0-7903-1963-6.
- "The New Zealand school publications branch". UNESDOC Digital Library. Paris: UNESCO. 1957.
