= Brian Sutton-Smith =

New Zealand academic and psychologist (1924–2015)

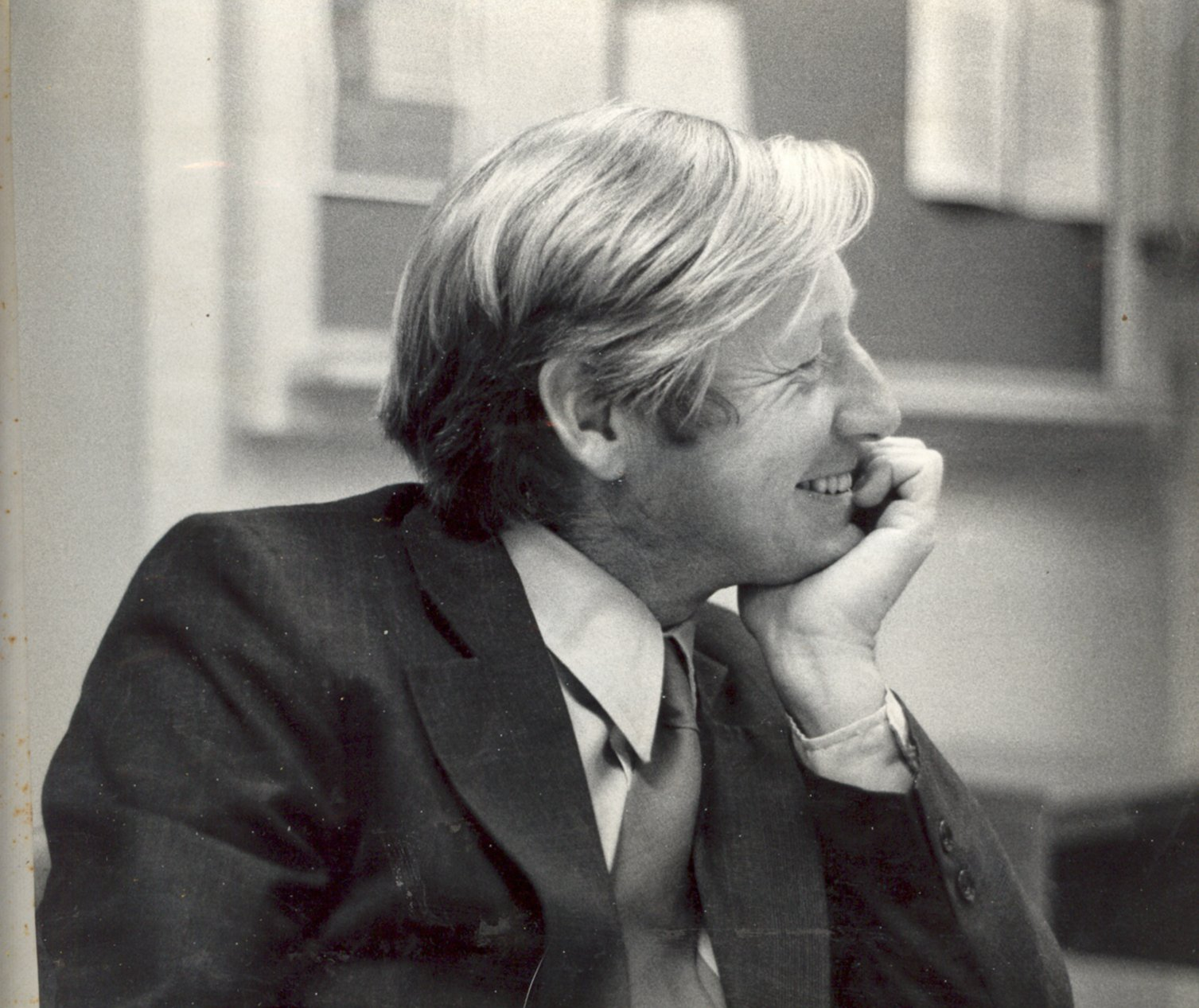
Brian Sutton-Smith in the 1970s

Brian Sutton Smith (July 15, 1924 – March 7, 2015), better known as Brian Sutton-Smith, was a play theorist who spent his lifetime attempting to discover the cultural significance of play in human life, arguing that any useful definition of play must apply to both adults and children. He demonstrated that children are not innocent in their play and that adults are indeed guilty in theirs. In both cases play pretends to assist them in surmounting their Darwinian struggles for survival. His book Play As Emotional Survival is a response to his own deconstruction of play theories in his work, The Ambiguity of Play (1997, Harvard University Press).

Sutton-Smith's interdisciplinary approach included research into play history and cross cultural studies of play, as well as research in psychology, education, and folklore. He maintained that the interpretation of play must involve all of its forms, from child's play to gambling, sports, festivals, imagination, and nonsense.

== Biography ==
Brian Sutton-Smith was born in Wellington, New Zealand in 1924. He trained as a teacher, completed a BA and MA, and was then awarded the first education PhD in New Zealand in 1954. Following the completion of his PhD, Sutton-Smith travelled to the USA on grant from the Fulbright Program, where he began an academic career with a focus on children's games, adult games, children's play, children's drama, films and narratives, as well as children's gender issues and sibling position.

Sutton-Smith was the author of some 50 books, the most recent of which is The Ambiguity of Play, and some 350 scholarly articles. He served as president of The Anthropological Association for the Study of Play and of The American Psychological Association, Division g10 (Psychology and the Arts). As a founder of the Children's Folklore Society he received a Lifetime Achievement Award from the American Folklore Society. For his research in toys he received awards from the BRIO and Lego toy companies of Sweden and Denmark. He participated in making television programs on toys and play in Great Britain, Canada, and the U.S., and was a consultant for Captain Kangaroo, Nickelodeon, Murdoch Children's Television, and the Please Touch Museum in Philadelphia.

His academic life consisted of 10 years at Bowling Green State University, Ohio, 10 years at Teachers College, Columbia University in New York, and 17 years at the University of Pennsylvania. He then retired to Sarasota, Florida. He died of Alzheimer's disease on March 7, 2015 in White River Junction, Vermont.

Sutton-Smith had recently been engaged as resident scholar at The Strong in Rochester, New York, home to the Brian Sutton-Smith Library and Archives of Play.

In addition, the New Zealand Association for Research in Education has created the Sutton-Smith Doctoral Award, which will be awarded annually for an excellent Doctoral thesis by an NZARE member.

== The Ambiguity of Play ==
In The Ambiguity of Play, Sutton-Smith details seven "rhetorics" of play, or ideologies that have been used to explain, justify, and privilege certain forms of play. These seven rhetorics are progress, fate, power, (community) identity, imaginary, self, and frivolity. Three of these—fate, power, and identity—Sutton-Smith identifies as ancient but still active and associates with a more collective focus. Another three are more recent, associated with a modern focus on the individual: progress, imaginary, and self. Sutton-Smith argues that the seventh rhetoric, frivolity, serves as a responsive rhetoric, in the sense that nonhegemonic forms of play are often deemed frivolous. In the conclusion, Sutton-Smith notes that variation is one of play's key features, with important resemblance to biological variation. While acknowledging that he is advancing a version of the progress narrative of play, Sutton-Smith posits that play may serve an important role in evolutionary adaptation.

== Key works ==
- The Sibling (1970)
- The Study of Games (1971)
- Child's Play (1971)
- The Folkgames of Children (1972)
- How to Play with Your Children (1974) co-author Shirley Sutton-Smith
- Play and Learning (1979)
- The Folkstories of Children (1981)
- A History of Children's Play (1981)
- Toys as Culture (1986)
- Play and Intervention (1994)
- Children's Folklore Source Book (1995)
- The Ambiguity of Play (1997)

== Works of fiction ==
Sutton-Smith is also the author of a series of novels about boys growing up in New Zealand in the 1930s, entitled Our Street, Smitty Does a Bunk, and The Cobbers. Initially published in serial form in 1949 in the New Zealand School Journal, the stories created a national furor as Brian Sutton-Smith allegedly endorsed morally unacceptable behavior in them.

== See also ==
- Strong National Museum of Play in Rochester, New York
