= George Warren Wood =

American Presbyterian missionary (1814–1901)

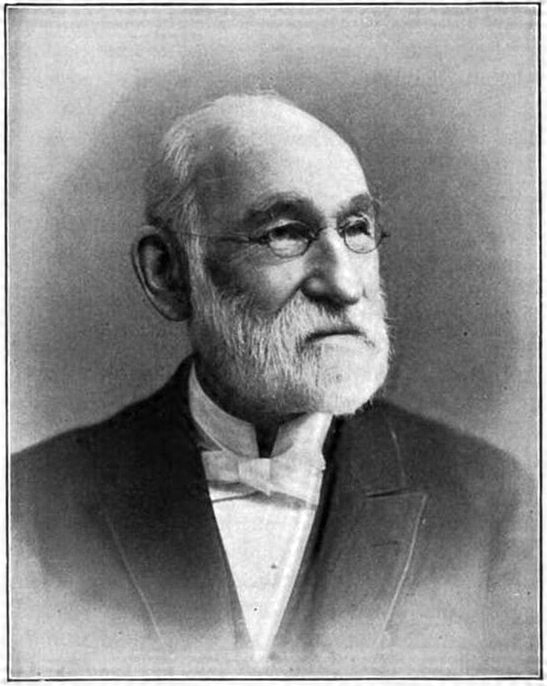
The elder Reverend George W. Wood as pictured in his 1901 obituary in the Missionary Herald.

George Warren Wood (known professionally as George W. Wood) (1814–1901) was a Presbyterian minister and missionary who became the secretary of the Congregationalist American Board of Commissioners for Foreign Missions. He was an early missionary to Armenia under Cyrus Hamlin.

His son, also named George Warren Wood, was also a Presbyterian reverend and missionary.

== Early life ==
Wood was born February 28, 1814, to Samuel and Mehitable (Peabody) Wood in Bradford, Massachusetts, near Haverhill, Massachusetts. Wood attended Bradford Academy and then graduated from Dartmouth College in 1832. After teaching in a religious school in Elizabeth, NJ for four years and studying theology, Wood entered Princeton Theological Seminary for 6 months before being licensed and ordained as an evangelist by the Presbytery of Elizabethtown.

== Career in missions ==
=== Mission work in Istanbul and elsewhere ===
He was ordained a Presbyterian missionary, at Morristown, N.J., on May 20, 1837. With his wife Martha, he served in Singapore East India (May 1838 – June 1840); Smyrna (1842), Trebizond Eyalet in the Ottoman Empire (1842–1843), eight years at Istanbul (March 1842 – July 1850), and associated with the Rev. Cyrus Hamlin in the Bebek Seminary. He became in charge of Bebek's Theological department, the first of its kind in Asia Minor

=== Return to the United States and work for the American Board ===
In 1850 he returned to the United States. In September 1852 he was elected Corresponding Secretary of the American Board of Foreign Missions in New York City, and continued in this position until 1871.

In Spring 1855, the ABCFM sent Wood to visit Choctaw Mission in Oklahoma to resolve a crisis over the abolition issue. After arriving in Stockbridge Mission, Wood spent over two weeks days visiting missions including the Goodwater Mission, Wheelock Academy, Spencer Academy, and other mission schools. He met with missionaries to discuss Selah B Treat's June 22, 1848, letter permitting them to maintain fellowship with slaveholders. Ultimately, the crisis was not resolved, and by 1859, the Board cut ties to the Choctaw mission altogether.

In 1856, Wood published a "Manual of Christian Theology" in Constantinople in association with H. G. O. Dwight and Edward Riggs.

In addition to his other secretarial duties, Wood assisted in presiding over the historic closure and relocation of the original Broadway Tabernacle in New York City in 1857.

In December 1862, Wood sailed from New York on his way to assist the Western Turkey Mission with his skills in the Armenian language. He stopped in London for several weeks to meet with the Turkish Missions Aid Society and arrived in Constantinople on March 7, 1863. During this time he also visited the Syria Mission. He returned to the United States June 6, 1864.

=== Return to missions in Turkey ===
When the New School Presbyterians withdrew from the American Board, Wood resumed his missions work in Constantinople for another 16 years from 1871 to 1886. While in Constantinople in 1879, Wood reported Turkish authorities in Amasia brutally persecuting Christian Armenian refugees from Soukoum Kaleh during the Russo-Turkish War (1877–78). He was able to coordinate with British Diplomat Edward Malet to bring the matter to the attention of the Sublime Porte, and then to the British foreign secretary Robert Gascoyne-Cecil (the Marquess of Salisbury).

== Personal life ==
Wood married Martha Maria Johnson (Daughter of Silas & Mary Johnson) on April 24, 1838, and she died in childbirth March 9, 1839.

He married again Martha Briggs (Daughter of William Briggs of Boston) on December 29, 1841, in Philadelphia, Pennsylvania. Mary bore four children (Sarah Johnson 1842, George Warren 1844, Louisa Whitehead 1846, and Henry Magie(sp?) 1849) in Turkey before she returned to the USA 1850–1851 on account of health, and died May 13, 1852.

He married a third time, to Mary C Hastings (daughter of Thomas Hastings of New York City, and widow of Daniel Bond ) on January 18, 1855. Mary died March 4, 1862.

In 1869, Wood married a fourth time, to Sara Ann (McNair) Heylmun, who died August 17, 1901.
