= Beverley Dunlop =

New Zealand writer (1935–2023)

- Born: Beverley Frances Gorbin; 25 August 1935; Tākaka, New Zealand
- Died: 18 October 2023 (aged 88); Hastings , New Zealand
- Occupations: Children's author; short story writer
- Spouse: John Archibald Dunlop (m. 1960; died 2013)

Beverley Frances Dunlop (née Gorbin; 25 August 1935 – 18 October 2023) was a New Zealand children's author and short story writer. She published numerous short stories in journals and magazines and four novels for children.

== Early life and career ==
Beverley Frances Gorbin was born in Tākaka on 25 August 1935. She moved to Napier at the time of her marriage to John Archibald Dunlop in 1960. She started writing for children while working as a legal secretary and music tutor. Her early work, from 1975 onwards, was published in magazines and literary journals including the New Zealand School Journal and in Landfall. In 1981 one of her stories was included in All The Dangerous Animals are in Zoos, an anthology of New Zealand short stories selected by John Barnett.

== Novels ==
In 1981 Dunlop won the Choysa Bursary for Children's Writers, a $5,000 award from the New Zealand Literary Fund enabling a children's writer to work on a specific project. At that time her first novel for children, The Dolphin Boy (1982), was with her publisher Hodder & Stoughton, and she was able to use the bursary to work on her second novel.

The Dolphin Boy is aimed at ages eight to twelve and tells the story of two children who meet a mysterious boy able to communicate with dolphins. It is illustrated by Sandra Morris. The novel was a bestseller, and a review in The Press said it was "well written with an exciting storyline, plenty of mystery and danger, and with underlying themes that should lead the young reader to think seriously about the relationship between humans and the animal world".

Her second novel, The Poetry Girl (1983), is about a young and lonely country girl of Russian heritage (like Dunlop herself) growing up in the 1940s who finds comfort in memorising poetry. Her third novel, Earthquake Town (1984), was illustrated by Garry Meeson and based on the 1931 Hawke's Bay earthquake. A reviewer in The Press was critical of the novel's realistic depiction of the disaster, suggesting it "is not a book I would give to any child I wanted to sleep well". Her fourth and final novel, Spirits of the Lake (1988), was about a young boy saving his mother and grandmother from ancient spirits, and was described by The Press as "different, thrilling, scary and thought provoking".

== Other work and later life ==
Dunlop was co-writer with Kay Mooney of Hawke's Bay: Profile of a Province (1986). A collection of her short stories for children was published as Queen Cat and Other Stories in 1988, illustrated by Deirdre Gardiner. The stories were described by The Press as having "a distinctly New Zealand flavour" and as appealing "to the target age group of six to nine-year-olds".

In 1999 she began writing stories about her cat Ollie and publishing them online on a newsgroup website. Ollie disappeared in August 2001; at the time Dunlop had written nearly 90 stories.

Dunlop died in Hastings on 18 October 2023, at the age of 88. Her husband John predeceased her in August 2013.

== Selected works ==
- The Dolphin Boy, illustrated by Sandra Morris (Hodder & Stoughton, 1982)
- The Poetry Girl (Hodder & Stoughton, 1983)
- Earthquake Town, illustrated by Garry Meeson (Hodder & Stoughton, 1984)
- Hawke's Bay: Profile of a Province, with Kay Mooney (Hodder & Stoughton, 1986)
- Spirits of the Lake (Hodder & Stoughton, 1988)
- Queen Cat and Other Stories, illustrated by Deirdre Gardiner (Hodder & Stoughton, 1988)
