= Joan Dukes (artist) =

New Zealand artist and illustrator

- Born: Joan Ivory Packham; 19 August 1903; Croydon, Surrey, England
- Died: 25 September 1993 (aged 90); Christchurch, New Zealand
- Education: Croydon School of Art
- Spouse: Lowell Dukes (m. 1936)

Joan Ivory Dukes (née Packham; 19 August 1903 – 25 September 1993) was a New Zealand artist and illustrator.

== Early life and family ==
Dukes was born Joan Ivory Packham in Croydon near London on 19 August 1903 as the eldest child of Claude and Emma Elizabeth Packham. She attended the Croydon School of Art and received an Arts and Crafts movement-influenced training. After moving to New Zealand, she married (Russell) Lowell Dukes on 6 June 1936 at St John's Church, Dannevirke, and they first lived in New Plymouth. In 1948 or 1949, the couple moved to St Kilda in Dunedin, and then to Christchurch in 1952.

== Artistic career ==
=== Teaching ===
After her study at the Croydon School of Art, Packham worked as an art teacher there and in 1933 in Surrey. In addition to teaching drawing, she also taught illustration and the history of costume. In New Zealand during World War II, Dukes gave private art lessons.

=== Illustration, exhibitions and costume design ===
A series of her illustrations received commendation in 1926 and 1927 in the Competition of Industrial Designs from the Royal Society of Arts, and while she was teaching in the United Kingdom she took commissions as an illustrator and costume designer. After moving to New Zealand, she initially struggled to find a market for her work. In 1937, she received critical success for an exhibition with the Auckland Society of Arts, and then the same in 1938 with the New Zealand Academy of Fine Arts in Wellington.

After World War II, Dukes started illustrating for the New Zealand School Journal. In the 1970s, she designed for ballet: in 1973, costumes for Coppélia for the Christchurch Town Hall opening festival; and then in 1976, sets for the Southern Ballet's Coppélia.

From 1948, Dukes exhibited at the Canterbury Society of Arts. In 1950, she exhibited at the New Zealand Academy of Fine Arts. In 1983, Dukes had a retrospective exhibition at the Canterbury Society of Arts. Dukes designed and made her own wedding dress, which is now held in the collection of Puke Ariki in New Plymouth.

== Death and legacy ==
Dukes died in Christchurch on 25 September 1993, a few weeks after her 90th birthday. Sixteen of her art works were bequeathed to the Christchurch Art Gallery in 1994, most of them illustrations featuring interesting characters.
