= George Woods (footballer) =

Australian rules footballer

Personal information
- Full name: George Woods
- Born: 27 September 1884
- Died: 30 December 1962 (aged 78)
- Original team: Williamstown

Playing career^{1}
| Years | Club | Games (Goals) |
| 1909 | Melbourne | 2 (1) |
- ^{1} Playing statistics correct to the end of 1909.

George Woods (27 September 1884 – 30 December 1962) was an Australian rules footballer who played with Melbourne in the Victorian Football League (VFL).
