= George Wood (Yorkshire cricketer) =

English cricketer

George William Wood (18 November 1862 – 4 December 1948) was an English first-class cricketer, who played two matches for Yorkshire County Cricket Club in 1895.

Born in Huddersfield, Yorkshire, Wood was a specialist wicket-keeper, who made his debut in a rain ruined match against Sussex at Fartown, Huddersfield, where his batting was not called upon, and Yorkshire did not take the field. Batting at number eleven, he scored two runs and a duck and completed a stumping against Somerset at Headingley, a low scoring match won by the home team by 103 runs.

Wood died in Huddersfield, in December 1948, aged 86.
