= Lani Wendt Young =

Samoan writer, editor, publisher and journalist

- Born: 1973 (age 52–53); Apia, Samoa
- Education: Victoria University of Wellington
- Occupation: Writer journalist
- Notable work: young adult
- Website: https://laniwendtyoung.co/

Lani Wendt Young is a Samoan–New Zealand writer, editor, publisher and journalist. She is the author of 15 books including the bestselling young adult series Telesa.

== Background ==
Wendt Young was born and raised in Apia, Samoa. Her father was Samoan from the villages of Lefaga, Vaiala, Sapapalii, and Malie. Her mother is New Zealand Māori of the Ngāti Kahungunu tribe.

== Career ==
"I wrote the first book because it was the kind of thing I wanted to read as a 14 to 16-year-old growing up in the islands. There were always so many stories set in other parts of the world but never anything I could directly connect with – never anything in Samoa."

— Wendt-Young speaking about her series Telesa.

In May 2025, Young was celebrated in the 'Resilient Spirit Project: Portraits of Women Warriors', a project by the Samoa Ministry of Women, Community and Social Development that honored thirty Samoan women who have shaped Samoa's history and continue to lead its future, at the grassroots and national levels. In February 2019, Young was the recipient of a New Zealand Society of Authors Waitangi Day Honor. In accepting the award, Young said:

As a brown woman who writes – oftentimes from the margins and smashing gates as I do so – I have seen the transformative power wrought by stories written by us, about us, and for us, as our communities the world over revel in books they can see themselves in, that they can embrace as their own. This literary honour is testament of that power, and emphasises the ever present need for more of us – to write, publish, and have the support we need to take our stories to an international audience.

Young was the 2018 ACP Pacific Laureate, selected by the Africa, Caribbean, Pacific Group of States. The writer prize recognises creativity, courage and entrepreneurship. The prize acknowledged her fiction writing, utilising of digital publishing to take Samoan stories to a global audience, and also her journalism.

Wendt Young was a co-founder of the online media site Samoa Planet. In May 2018 she was the recipient of the Douglas Gabb Australia Pacific Journalism Internship, hosted by ABC News and the Australian Dept of Foreign Affairs and Trade. In 2017, she was one of 10 "outstanding journalists" from the Pacific selected to report on the 2017 United Nations Climate Change Conference, held in Bonn, Germany.

She is the author of the young adult fantasy Telesa series, which has been described as the Pacific version of Twilight, and credited with helping to inspire young Pacific people around the world to read fiction from Oceania. The story is set in modern Samoa and is inspired by ancient mythology.

In 2015, Wendt Young published two books in her contemporary romance series: Scarlet Secrets and Scarlet Lies. A third book, Scarlet Redemption, was published in 2019.

In 2011 Young's Sleepless in Samoa: A Collection of Short Fiction won the USP Press Prize for Fiction. It was later published as Afakasi Woman: A Collection of Short Fiction. She also writes stories for children, which have been published by the New Zealand School Journal.

She was commissioned in 2009 to research and write Pacific Tsunami Galu Afi. The book gave accounts of over 180 survivors, rescuers, medical teams and aid workers from Samoa, American Samoa and the Tongan island of Niuatoputapu. The printing of the book was funded by the Government of Australia.

In 2002 she won the Telecom Samoa short story competition. Her short fiction has since been published in collections in New Zealand, Australia and Samoa.

Young has called blogging her "first writing love" and her blog Sleepless in Samoa has an international following. She chronicles with wry humor, the parenting journey raising 5 children. She also writes about feminism, religion, climate justice and LGBTI/faafafine/faatama in Oceania. She is an advocate for survivors of child sexual abuse and has written at length about family violence in Samoa.

The ACP Secretariat said of Young:

Through her, we wished to salute courage: this young journalist who writes for Samoa Planet, in fact openly denounces the vacillation of the major powers-that-be, which have been so slow to adopt urgent measures to tackle climate change.

Through her, we wished to commend the inventiveness of young people, who are capable of exploring the possibilities offered by the Internet to make themselves known, get published, communicate, exchange, change outlooks, and rattle positions. Using her blog "Sleepless in Samoa" and other online media, Lani Wendt Young shares all her experiences and adventures in self-publishing, with wholesome freshness, while encouraging young writers to take the plunge.

Through her, we wished to commend the young female author of a popular series, who is making reading attractive to a young audience, to whom she demonstrates that internationally known romance plots can be perfectly portrayed using Pacific references.

Her book, Fire's Caress, was shortlisted for the young adult fiction award at the 2021 New Zealand Book Awards for Children and Young Adults. In August 2022 it won the Sir Julius Vogel Award for "best youth novel".

In August 2021 she released Mata Oti ('Eyes of Death'), the first Zombie apocalypse story set in Samoa. A seventh book in her Telesa series, Earth's Embrace, was published in April 2022.
