= George Ingersoll Wood =

American clergyman (1814–1899)

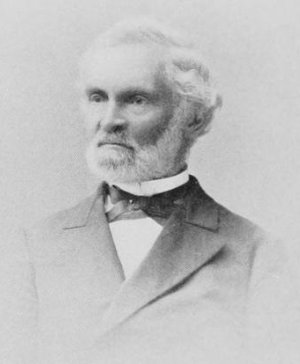
- Born: May 20, 1814; Stamford, Connecticut, US
- Died: January 9, 1899 (aged 84); Washington, D.C., US
- Education: Yale College; Union Theological Seminary
- Occupation: Clergyman
- Spouse: Susan Townsend Merwin (m. 1840)
- Children: 4

George Ingersoll Wood (May 20, 1814 – January 9, 1899) was an American Congregationalist clergyman and a founding member of Yale's Skull and Bones Society.

== Biography ==
Rev. George Ingersoll Wood was born in Stamford, Connecticut. He was the son of Hon. Joseph Wood and Frances Ellsworth, daughter of Supreme Court Chief Justice Oliver Ellsworth.

He graduated from Yale College in 1833 and the Union Theological Seminary in New York City in 1838. While at Yale he was a founding member of The Skull and Bones Society. He and his wife Susan, married in 1840, had four children.

Wood was ordained in Washington, D.C., on May 18, 1840, and pastored the Second Presbyterian Church there for a year. He was then pastor in several of the Congregational churches of Connecticut: West Hartford (1842–1844), North Branford (1844–1850, 1855–1858), Ellington (1850–1854, 1869–1870), and Guilford (1858–1867). During these years he had repeated bronchial sickness that required him to take leave from his pulpit. Beginning in 1868, he took a year and a half of respite in St. Cloud, Minnesota, serving in the town's First Congregational church.

He died at age 84 in Washington, D.C.

== Family ==
He married Susan Townsend Merwin, daughter of Rev. Samuel Merwin and Clarina B. Taylor, on April 28, 1840 at New Haven, Connecticut.

Children of Rev. George Ingersoll Wood and Susan Townsend Merwin:

- Emily Merwin Wood (February 11, 1841 – May 18, 1916)
- Brig. Gen. Oliver Ellsworth Wood (June 6, 1844 – December 4, 1910)
- George Ingersoll Wood (February 12, 1850 – April 15, 1877)
- Joseph Wolcott Wood (October 12, 1851 – May 3, 1877)
