= Edward Riggs =

American reporter (1856–1924)

Edward Riggs (March 24, 1856 – January 17, 1924) was a political reporter for The Sun (New York). His full name was Edward Gridley Riggs. After retiring from The Sun in 1913 Riggs became an executive assistant to the president of the New York, New Haven & Hartford Railroad. Riggs was born in New York City and died at his home at 38 South Portland Avenue, Brooklyn, New York. His father, James W. Riggs, was the financial editor of the New York Courier-Enquirer and later The Sun.

== Career ==
Riggs began his newspaper career by writing about financial and commercial subjects for the New York World. He moved on to write about politics for The Sun. He frequently attended both national and state political conventions. Riggs befriended a number of important political figures of his era. Among his friends included Presidents William McKinley, Theodore Roosevelt, William Howard Taft, and Grover Cleveland.

His tenure with the New York, New Haven & Hartford Railroad involved him serving as an intermediary between newspapers in the United States and the company's president. Continuing to follow political events, Riggs contributed political and financial articles to Harper's Weekly, The Bookman (New York), Everybody's Magazine, the North American Review, The Forum, and Munsey's Magazine, and other political magazines.

In 1912 he was named by Governor John Adams Dix to the New York City Public Service Commission. He was never confirmed in part because of opponents in Tammany Hall who considered Riggs a member of the Republican Party. Riggs considered himself to be an Independent.

== Personal life ==
In 1878 he married Elizabeth S. Brown of Forestville, Connecticut. Riggs was a member of the Lotos, Barnard, Manhattan, and Newspaper Clubs. He was also affiliated with the Pilgrims Society.

== Death ==
Riggs succumbed to an illness which began during the Christmas holidays in 1923. Funeral services were conducted from St. Ann's Church, Clinton and Livingston Streets, in Brooklyn.
