= George Warren Wood Jr =

G. W. Wood Jr. (born in 1844 in Turkey, died January 21, 1924, in Fairhope, Alabama) served Presbyterian missions in Charlevoix, Michigan (1870s), the Montana Territory (1880s), and the Michilimackinaw area (1890s) before retiring to Alabama in 1901 to help start the Fairhope Single Tax Corporation.

== Early life ==
G. W. Wood Jr. was born in 1844 in Turkey as his father was a missionary there. After graduating from Hamilton College in Upstate New York in 1865, he taught and pursued advanced studies at the college of the City of New York. He graduated from Union Theological Seminary in New York City in 1869.

== Early missionary career in Michigan ==
Rev. Wood, Jr became ordained as a Presbyterian pastor in the Saginaw Presbytery and domestic missionary for the Presbyterian Board of Home Missions in Au Sable and Oscoda in January 1872. He married Harriet Snyder in May 1872 in Iosco County and then arrived in Charlevoix, Michigan in late November 1872 to be appointed a Home Missionary in that place in 1873. Wood, Jr. ministered in Charlevoix, Michigan, and Bear River, Michigan, from January 1874 to 1879. During 1877–1879, he worked as a colporteur in the same region (reaching mainly homesteaders throughout Emmet County and Charlevoix County) for the American Bible Society rather than for the Presbyterian Board of Home Missions. Wood, Jr. had been a lifetime member of the ABS since at least 1873.

== Missionary work in Dakotas and Montana ==
He was a missionary at the Dakota Mission (Fort Peck/Wolf Point) from 1879-1889. The first Presbyterian presence on the Fort Peck Indian Reservation began when Wood worked with the Native American (primarily Assiniboine and Sioux) population in 1881 and established a mission day school for children in 1883 on the north bank of the Missouri River, about three-quarters of a mile from present-day Wolf Point. During Wood's tenure in Montana, the natives grappled with the establishment of Camp Poplar River by the 11th Infantry, construction of the Montana Central Railway (later known as the Great Northern Railway), arrival of white settlers, US bans on the Sun Dance and other cultural practices, extinction of the Buffalo in northeast Montana, and starvation during extremely harsh winters. In 1884, Wood oversaw a mission that was suffering from extreme poverty and starvation, and the Indian Rights Association convinced Congress to make a special appropriation. From 1885 to Montana Statehood in 1889, the tribes associated with Wood in the Dakota Mission participated in agreements with the US government to re-drawing the boundaries of the Fort Peck reservation in exchange for federal subsidies. The Presbyterian community he started there became "Union Church" in 1914 and celebrated its centennial in 2014 as "First Presbyterian Church" in Wolf Point.

== Later missionary career in Northern Michigan ==
In 1892, Wood, Jr. was in Boyne, Michigan, publishing a newspaper called "The Ensign" From 1892 to 1893 Wood, Jr. was a home missionary in Lakefield, Michigan, in the upper peninsula of Michigan. Starting in 1892, Wood was the editor and publisher of a weekly newspaper at Mackinaw City called the "Mackinaw Witness.

In 1894, Wood hosted Alabama native and missionary, Dr. George A. Weaver, as a fundraiser for the American Sunday School Union in the Mackinaw area.

In 1894 Wood's Witness was listed as the sole newspaper published in Mackinaw City, and continued to be published by him in 1897. " In October 1897, the Cheboygan Democrat profiled the struggling Mackinaw Witness news operation and remarked that Rev Wood and his son George H. Wood were editor and manager respectively. The review noted that the Witness contained much "curious information" including railroad timetables, [lost] "cats and dogs", minor news, Sabbath Readings, New Earth columns, and "snide advertising" for questionable gold mining companies, single tax theory, crank books, and the Scientific American. In November 1897, Wood wrote a letter in the Witness regarding his new colony on Mobile Bay in Alabama called the Fairhope Industrial Association.

== Progressive Era Politics and Retirement in Alabama ==
During the Progressive Era, Wood, Jr. moved to Fairhope, Alabama, around 1900 (as early as 1897 or 1898). His daughter Sarah Louise Wood married Fairhope pioneer Clement LeFavre Coleman in 1902, and in 1903, George Wood became a charter member of the Fairhope Single Tax Corporation. He was Secretary of the FSTC in 1905, and was its treasurer from 1908 to at least 1912. In 1912, Wood, Jr.'s biography was listed in Herringshaw's American blue book of biography. As part of the FSTC, Wood became a member of the Fairhope Wharf Company in December 1912 and became president of the wharf company in January 1913. Wood, Jr. lived in Fairhope as late as 1919, where he complained to the National Voters' League about extortion by the railway companies.

His wife Harriet Snyder Wood, after bearing Wood, Jr. two sons and five daughters, died in Mount Pleasant, Washington, D.C. in 1922. George Warren Wood Jr. died in 1924.
