= George Wood (Somerset cricketer) =

English cricketer

George Robert Wood (7 December 1865 – 3 September 1948) played first-class cricket for Somerset in 1893 and 1894. He was born at Reading, Berkshire and died at Lyme Regis, Dorset.
