= George Woods (artist) =

New Zealand illustrator and artist (1898–1963)

- Born: 1898; Kumara, New Zealand
- Died: 1963 (aged 64–65)

George Woods (1898 – 4 April 1963) was a New Zealand draughtsman, illustrator, and artist. His works show the influence of Māori culture and the Pacific Islands; he had a reputation as an excellent colourist.

== Education ==
Woods undertook night study at the Wellington Technical College (forerunner to the Wellington Polytechnic) under Harry Linley Richardson, and Frederick Vincent Ellis in 1936.

== Commercial career ==
Woods' worked at a number of advertising agencies in New Zealand and Australia. While studying at the Wellington Technical College he worked at the Goldberg and Ilott Advertising studios. He also worked in Sydney before moving to the Carlton Caruthers advertising agency in Wellington. While at Carlton Caruthers, he mainly designed posters for the Majestic Theatre, which was across the road from the agency, but also met Ernest Mervyn Taylor. In 1937, Taylor and Woods established a small freelance studio in Willis St, Wellington creating a number of illustrations for the Reed Publishing Company.

== Art ==
As a modernist, George Woods is best known for his graphic, stylised images and is most readily contextualised alongside contemporaries Russell Clark (1905–1966) and E. Mervyn Taylor (1906–1964). His early work, particularly illustration of books, is associated with the New Zealand Nationalist art movement, with his work set firmly in a native environment. He recognised nature as the bottom line for artists, commenting: "I think artists should begin where Nature leaves off." His colour linocuts exhibited a strong linear image, and his skills as a draughtsman allowed him to develop a sculptural element to his work. Woods frequently employed the technique of simplifying his subject matter by accentuating physical characteristics and omitting others entirely. He had an ability to capture form and light through simple line forms and use of unbroken colour. Many of his works show a flirtation with eroticism and exoticism.

His etching Nude (c. 1939) was one of the few prints selected for inclusion in the Centennial Exhibition of International and New Zealand Art at the National Gallery in Wellington. Woods was also included in the New Zealand Society of Artists Exhibition of Works by Contemporary New Zealand Artists, 1939.

Woods was intensely interested in Māori culture and had a keen appreciation of Polynesian art and sculpture, borne out of his travels in the region after finishing studies at the Wellington Technical College. Both Woods and his contemporary E. Mervyn Taylor, reinterpreted Māori mythology from a New Zealand European perspective at a time when attitudes of white New Zealanders to Māori were changing. Woods and Taylor created a new iconography to represent their mythological Māori world; Woods' Māori were archetypal, strong and powerful figures that lived in a timeless idyllic land. George Woods' illustrations for A.H. Reed's Myths and Legends of Māoriland (1946) demonstrate the iconography he used. His drawings emphasise Māori facial features and lithe muscular physiques and also include moko. He includes native birds and plants to provide a distinct New Zealand context. He often adopts a heroic character for the dramatic passages of the book. In the image The Battle of the Wind and Sea Gods (c. 1946), Woods depicts sinuous tension in their muscles and frames them in turbulent clouds and waves. His drawings for this book attain a high standard in both design and execution. Woods and Taylor were the country's most prominent book illustrators in the early 20th century. Many of the prints they created as illustrations for books were included in their solo and group exhibitions. The scraper-board print Battle of the Wind and the Sea Gods (1945), won Woods the Esther Glen Award from the New Zealand Library Association for outstanding contribution to children's literature.

Woods' scraper-board print Māori Navigators (c. 1940) was inspired by the Māori myth of the great fleet of canoes departed from the legendary Hawaiki on a voyage of discovery making landfall in New Zealand in 1350. His image of a canoe cresting a wave appealed to New Zealanders celebrating the centenary of the 1840 arrival of settlers' ships. The image was published as a frontispiece to A.H. Reed's The Story of New Zealand in 1945, placing it firmly in the public's imagination as an icon of nationhood.

Woods also created a series of colour linocuts based on The Rubáiyát of Omar Khayyám; using rich colour and patterns to create the appearance of Persian miniatures.

== Illustrations ==
- Poppa passes: the adventures of the Vedgie people, by A.W. Reed (c. 1943)
- At the bottom of the garden: my own seed book, by A.W. Reed (1944)
- Introduction to New Zealand, by New Zealand Department of Internal Affairs (1945)
- Stories of fairies, by A.W. Reed (1962)
- A song of praise for Māoriland (filmstrip), by A.H. Reed (195?)
- Myths and legends of Māoriland, by A.W. Reed (1958)
- Building the main trunk, by New Zealand Railways Department (1960)
- Commissioned to illustrate the 1950 Imperial Chemical Industries calendar – Design Review: Volume 2, Issue 5 (February – March 1950)
- Contributed an essay on Design in Year Book Of The Arts In New Zealand, No. 4 (1948)

== Works of art ==
Title	Medium	Date	Image			
Nude	Monotype	1930s–40s				
Nude No 1	Linocut	1930s–50				
Nude No 2	Linocut	1930s–50				
The Artist's Wife	Aquatint	1930s–50				
Girl Dressing Her Hair	Monotype	1930s–50				
Girl	Monotype	1930s–50				
Man Reading	Monotype	1930s–50				
Cat	Monotype	1930s–50				
Figures	Monotype	1930s–50				
Reflections	Linocut	1931				
Meditation	Drypoint	1932				
Nocturne	Aquatint	1933				
Portrait Study	Aquatint	1933				
Nude	Etching	1939				
Malama	Aquatint	1940				
Mamu	Aquatint	1940				
Maori Navigators	Scraper-Board	1940				
Joan Asleep	Aquatint	1940s				
Marine Pattern 2	Colour Linocut	1940s				
Nude	Aquatint	1940s				
Design with Blue Girl	Colour Linocut	1940s				
Beethoven	Aquatint	1943				
Malama	Scraper-Board	1943				
Figure 1	Linocut	1944				
Figure 2	Linocut	1944				
Reclining Nude	Linocut	1944				
Maori Head	Woodcut	1945				
Standing Nude	Colour Linocut	1945				
Hinemoa	Scraper-Board	1945				
Battle of the Sea and Shore Birds	Scraper-Board	1945				
Ruarangi and the Turehu	Scraper-Board	1945				
Young Hatupatu	Scraper-Board	1945				
Tawhaki the Bold	Scraper-Board	1945				
Tawhaki Calls on the Gods	Scraper-Board	1945				
Battle of the Wind and the Sea Gods	Scraper-Board	1945				
Kahukura and the Fairy Fisherman	Scraper-Board	1945				
The Flying Taniwah Namu and Naeroa	Scraper-Board	1945				
Rupe as a Pigeon	Scraper-Board	1945				
Decorative Design No 1	Colour Linocut	1946				
Marine Pattern 1	Colour Linocut	1946				
Moorish Idol	Colour Linocut	1946				
Toy Fish	Colour Linocut	1946				
Banded File Fish (Topical Fish)	Colour Linocut	1946				
Decorative Design No 2	Colour Linocut	1946				
Decorative Design No 3 (Woman with Foal)	Colour Linocut	1946				
Triangle	Colour Linocut	1946				
Figure and Landscape	Colour Linocut	1946				
Silver Morning	Colour Linocut	1947				
Wind (Strong Wind)	Colour Linocut	1947				
Leda	Colour Linocut	1947				
Woman	Colour Linocut	1947	-	Polynesian Mask	Wood-Engraving	1947
Malia	Colour Linocut	1947				
Head	Aquatint	1947				
Come with Old Khayyam	Colour Linocut	1950				
And Leave with Wise to Talk	Colour Linocut	1950				
I Sent My Soul Through the Invisible	Colour Linocut	1950				
A Book of Verse and Thought	Colour Linocut	1950				
Driftwood Form	Linocut	1950				
William Colenso, botanist-printer	Scraper-Board	1950				
