= Albert Wendt =

Samoan poet and writer

Albert Wendt ONZ CNZM
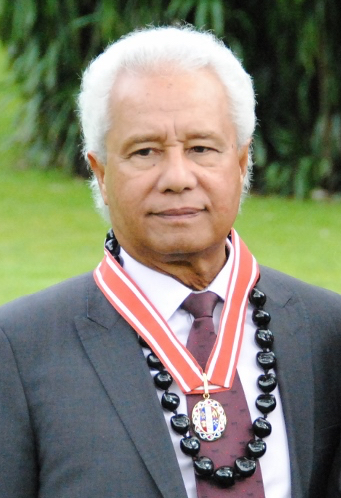
- Wendt in 2013
- Born: 27 October 1939 (age 87); Apia, Samoa
- Occupations: Author; academic
- Partner: Reina Whaitiri
- Awards: Prime Minister's Award for Literary Achievement (2012); Icon Award (2018)

Academic background
- Education: New Plymouth Boys' High School
- Alma mater: Victoria University

Academic work
- Discipline: Pacific literature; New Zealand literature
- Institutions: The University of Auckland, University of the South Pacific
- Notable works: Sons for the Return Home (1973); Leaves of the Banyan Tree (1979)

Albert Tuaopepe Wendt ONZ CNZM (born 27 October 1939) is a Samoan poet and writer who lives in New Zealand. He is one of the most influential writers in Oceania. His notable works include Sons for the Return Home, published in 1973 (adapted into a feature film in 1979), and Leaves of the Banyan Tree, published in 1979. As an academic he has taught at universities in Samoa, Fiji, Hawaii and New Zealand, and from 1988 to 2008 was the professor of New Zealand literature at the University of Auckland.

Wendt is the recipient of many prestigious awards, including twice receiving the Commonwealth Writers Prize for the Asia-Pacific region, multiple top awards at the New Zealand Book Awards, the 2012 Prime Minister's Award for Literary Achievement in Fiction and an Icon Award from the Arts Foundation of New Zealand in 2018. In 2013 he was appointed a member of the Order of New Zealand, New Zealand's highest civilian honour, recognising his pivotal role in the formation of Pacific literature in English.

== Early life ==
Wendt was born in Apia, Western Samoa (now known as Samoa) in 1939, and lived in Samoa as a child. He was one of nine children, and his father was a plumber. He is of German heritage through his great-grandfather on his father's side, but in 2002 said he considered his family heritage to be "totally Samoan". In 1952, Wendt received a scholarship to attend New Plymouth Boys' High School in New Zealand. He graduated in 1957. During his time at the school he had a couple of poems and a short story published in the school's annual magazine, The Taranakian.

He completed a diploma of teaching at Ardmore Teachers' College in 1959, and subsequently attended Victoria University of Wellington, graduating with a Master of Arts in History in 1964. His Master's thesis was about the Mau, Samoa's independence movement from colonialism during the first decade of the 1900s. He began to publish work in literary magazines, including the New Zealand School Journal, the New Zealand Listener, and Landfall while attending Victoria University. In 1963, he received an award from Landfall for the best prose by a writer under the age of 25, for his short story "The Name of the Game". He has said that at the time he started writing, he was inspired by the examples of Alistair Te Ariki Campbell, Jacquie Sturm and Hone Tuwhare, who were then the only well-known Polynesian writers in New Zealand.

== Literary career ==
=== Time in the Pacific Islands: 1965–1987 ===
In 1965 Wendt returned to Samoa and became the headmaster of Samoa College. He continued to send poems and short stories back to New Zealand for publication in magazines, and in 1972 he wrote two plays: Comes the Revolution, performed at the South Pacific Arts Festival, and The Contract, performed at the School's Drama Festival in Apia. He began working on the epic novel Leaves of the Banyan Tree around this time, but due to its length, put it aside and finished the novel Sons for the Return Home first, which was published in 1973. It described the experiences of a young Samoan man in New Zealand, and in 1979 was adapted into a feature film directed by Paul Maunder, which was the first film focusing on the experiences of Pacific people in New Zealand.

In 1974 Wendt was appointed a senior lecturer at the University of the South Pacific, and worked both in Suva and at its Samoan centre. There, he published a number of articles in the literary journal Mana (including works examining the impact of colonialism on Pacific arts and culture) and edited collections of poems from Fiji, Samoa, the New Hebrides (now Vanuatu), and the Solomon Islands. In 1974 he published a collection of short stories, in the style of modern-day fables, titled Flying Fox in a Freedom Tree. Two stories from the collection were adapted into a feature film of the same name directed by Martyn Sanderson in 1989. His first poetry collection, Inside Us the Dead: Poems 1961 to 1974, was published in 1976, and a novella, Pouliuli (translated as "darkness"), was published in 1977.

Wendt's epic family saga Leaves of the Banyan Tree (1979) won first place at the 1980 Goodman Fielder Wattie Book Awards. In 1980 he was the editor of Lali, an anthology of Pacific writing. From 1982 to 1987 he was the professor of Pacific literature at the University of the South Pacific, and was also appointed to the position of pro-vice-chancellor.

=== Later career in New Zealand: 1988–present ===
In 1988 he was appointed as the first professor of New Zealand literature at the University of Auckland. He was the first Pacific Islander to be appointed as an English professor at the university. In his later career he edited important anthologies of Pacific writing including Nuanua (1995), Whetu Moana: Contemporary Polynesian Poems in English (2003) (with Reina Whaitiri and Robert Sullivan) and Mauri Ola: Contemporary Polynesian Poems in English – Whetu Moana II (2010) (with Whaitiri and Sullivan). Whetu Moana was awarded the Montana Award for Reference and Anthology at the 2004 Montana New Zealand Book Awards, and was the first anthology of modern Polynesian poetry in English to have Polynesian editors. Its successor Mauri Ora was a finalist in the Poetry category at the 2011 New Zealand Post Book Awards.

Wendt's later works include poetry collections Shaman of Visions (1984) and Photographs (1995), and short story collection In The Birth and Death of the Miracle Man (1986), both of which feature works set in Samoa. The novel Ola (1991) features a female protagonist travelling around the world and themes of religious faith and identity, and won the 1992 Commonwealth Writers Prize for the Asia-Pacific Region. Black Rainbow (1992) is described by Wendt as an "allegorical thriller", and featured a dystopian future New Zealand. In 1994 he was appointed to the Order of Merit of Samoa for his services to education and literature.

In 1999, he was the visiting Professor of Asian and Pacific Studies at the University of Hawaiʻi. In 2000 he delivered the New Zealand Book Council lecture, titled Le Vaipe: the Dead Water. In the 2001 New Year Honours, he was appointed a Companion of the New Zealand Order of Merit, for services to literature. He received the Senior Pacific Islands Artist's Award at the 2003 Arts Pasifika Awards, and his first play The Songmaker's Chair premiered that year. In 2004 he was awarded the Nikkei Asia Prize for Culture. In 2005, Victoria University made him an honorary Doctor of Literature. From 2004 to 2008 he held the position of Citizen's Chair at the University of Hawaiʻi.

He retired from his university professorship in 2008. In 2009, his verse novel The Adventures of Vela was published, which he had begun writing in the 1970s; extracts had earlier been included in the collection Photographs (1995). He won his second Commonwealth Writers Prize in the Asia-Pacific Region for this work. In the same year he was awarded an Honorary Doctorate of Humane Letters from the University of Hawaiʻi. In 2012, he was presented with the Prime Minister's Award for Literary Achievement for Fiction, worth NZ$60,000, and that same year his ʻaiga, ʻAiga Sa-Maualaivao, granted him their highest title of Maualaivao in a Samoan ceremony. In the 2013 Queen's Birthday Honours, he was appointed a member of the Order of New Zealand, New Zealand's highest civilian honour.

He became a patron of the New Zealand Book Council in 2015. Later that year, he published a memoir, Out of the Vaipe, the Deadwater, about his early life in Apia, and a novel, Breaking Connections, about a group of friends and their life in Auckland. In 2018 he was recognised as one of New Zealand's greatest twenty living artists and presented with an Icon Award by the Arts Foundation of New Zealand. Poetry by Wendt was included in UPU, a curation of Pacific Island writers' work which was first presented at the Silo Theatre as part of the Auckland Arts Festival in March 2020. UPU was remounted as part of the Kia Mau Festival in Wellington in June 2021.

== Legacy and influence ==
Throughout his career Wendt has been a leader in postcolonial literature. His works have been published widely internationally and translated into French, Chinese, German, Dutch and Japanese. The first notable study of his work was published in 2003, by Paul Sherrad, titled Albert Wendt and Pacific Literature: Circling the Void. New Zealand scholar Lydia Wevers said that Wendt's works "have been instrumental in shaping a Pacific literature in English, especially in its evolution from oral to written form". In addition to his own works, of which the most well-known is Sons for the Return Home (1973), Wendt has played a wider role in shaping the cultural life of Oceania; writers Teresia Teaiwa and Selina Tusitala Marsh noted, in an introduction to a special 2010 issue of The Contemporary Pacific focussing on Wendt's legacy:

Without a doubt, there are a number of Wendt’s contemporaries who, like him, have created invaluable legacies to inspire challenge thinking in, of, and about the Pacific— or Oceania. But in crucial ways, Wendt is an unparalleled figure in our region.

He is the subject of a documentary, The New Oceania, made in New Zealand by Point of View Productions. Directed by Shirley Horrocks, the film screened at the New Zealand International Film Festival and Hawaii International Film Festival in 2005, on TVNZ in 2006 and on ABC Australia in 2007.

== Personal life ==
As a young teacher, Wendt married Jenny Whyte, and they had two daughters and a son. One of his daughters, Mele Wendt, was made a Member of the New Zealand Order of Merit for services to governance in the 2019 New Year Honours.

Wendt has been in a relationship with his partner, Reina Whaitiri, since his marriage ended in the early 1990s. He is a cousin of actor Nathaniel Lees, who directed and starred in Wendt's play The Songmaker's Chair at the 2003 Auckland Arts Festival. His niece Lani Wendt Young is also a writer.

== Awards and honours ==
- 1980 – Wattie Book of the Year for Leaves of the Banyan Tree
- 1992 – Commonwealth Writers Prize in the Asia-Pacific Region for Ola
- 1994 – Order of Merit of Samoa for services to education and literature
- 2001 – Companion of the New Zealand Order of Merit for services to literature
- 2003 – Senior Pacific Arts Award, Arts Pasifika Awards
- 2004 – Nikkei Asia Prize for Culture
- 2004 – Montana Book Award for Whetu Moana
- 2010 – Commonwealth Writers Prize in the Asia-Pacific Region for The Adventures of Vela
- 2012 – Prime Minister's Awards for Literary Achievement in Fiction
- 2013 – Order of New Zealand
- 2018 – Icon Award from the New Zealand Arts Foundation

== Selected works ==
Novels, short story collections and memoirs

- Sons for the Return Home (1973)
- Flying Fox in a Freedom Tree: And Other Stories, short story collection (1974)
- Pouliuli (1977)
- Leaves of the Banyan Tree (1979)
- The Birth and Death of the Miracle Man, short story collection (1986)
- Ola (1991)
- Black Rainbow (1992)
- The Best of Albert Wendt's Short Stories (1999)
- The Mango's Kiss: a Novel (2003)
- The Adventures of Vela (2009)
- Ancestry, short story collection (2012)
- Breaking Connections (2015)
- Out of the Vaipe, The Deadwater: A Writer's Early Life, memoir (2015)

Poetry collections

- Inside Us the Dead. Poems 1961 to 1974 (1976)
- Photographs (1995)
- Shaman of Visions (1984)
- The Book of the Black Star (2002)
- From Mānoa to a Ponsonby Garden (2012)

Plays

- Comes the Revolution (1972)
- The Contract (1972)
- The Songmaker's Chair (2004)

Anthologies and other edited works

- Lali: A Pacific Anthology (1980)
- 100 Lovers of Taamaki Makaurau, edited by Wendt and Witi Ihimaera (1994)
- Nuanua: Pacific Writing in English since 1980 (1995)
- Wendt, Albert; Whaitiri, Reina; Sullivan, Robert, eds. (December 2002). Whetu Moana: Contemporary Polynesian Poetry in English. Auckland Univ Press. ISBN 9781869402730.
- Wendt, Albert; Whaitiri, Reina; Sullivan, Robert, eds. (September 2010). Mauri Ola: Contemporary Polynesian Poems in English. Auckland: Auckland UP. ISBN 9781869404482.
