= Robert Sullivan (poet) =

New Zealand poet, academic and editor

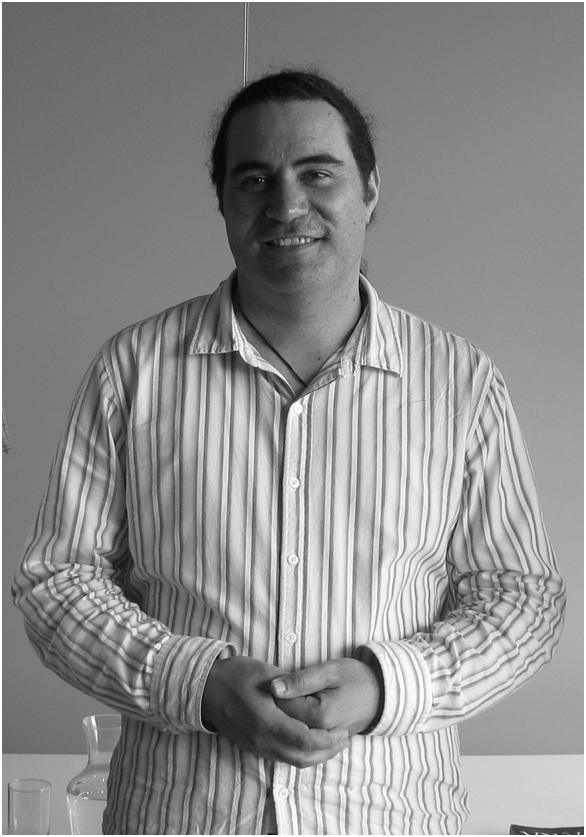
- Sullivan in 2011

14th New Zealand Poet Laureate
- Incumbent
- Assumed office 22 August 2025
- Preceded by: Chris Tse

Personal details
- Born: Robert Brenton Massey Sullivan; 1967 (age 58–59) Auckland, New Zealand
- Occupation: Poet; academic; editor

Academic background
- Education: University of Auckland
- Thesis: Mana Moana: Wayfinding and Five Indigenous Poets (2015)
- Doctoral advisor: Selina Tusitala Marsh
- Writing career
- Period: 1990–

Robert Brenton Massey Sullivan (born 1967) is a New Zealand Māori poet, academic and editor. His published poetry collections include Jazz Waiata (1990), Star Waka (1999) and Shout Ha! to the Sky (2010). His books have a postmodern quality and "explore social and racial subjects, and aspects of Māori tradition and history." He is "widely seen as one of the most important contemporary Māori poets."

He is the current New Zealand Poet Laureate following his appointment for a three year term from August 2025.

== Early life and education ==
Sullivan is of Māori and Irish descent. His grandfather was an immigrant to New Zealand from Galway. He identifies with the Ngā Puhi (Ngāti Manu/Ngāti Hau) and Kāi Tahu iwi, and describes himself as multicultural.

Sullivan was raised in Auckland and attended Auckland Grammar. He earned a Bachelor of Arts in English and Māori studies and a Master of Arts with Honours, supervised by Albert Wendt, from the University of Auckland. He also has a diploma in library and information studies from Victoria University of Wellington and a diploma in teaching from the University of Waikato.

He began teaching at the University of Hawaiʻi in 2003 and received a teaching award in 2008 for his work as associate professor of English. He also held the position of Director of Creative Writing at the University of Hawaiʻi. At the Manukau Institute of Technology, Sullivan led the creative writing programme and served as Deputy Chief Executive (Māori). He graduated 2015 from the University of Auckland with a PhD thesis on charting "diverse indigenous worlds in the published poetry of five first and second wave Pacific writers," supervised by Selina Tusitala Marsh.

== Writing and editing ==
Sullivan's wide-ranging work explores dimensions of Māori tradition as well as "contemporary urban experiences, including local racial and social concerns". His writing has a post modern feel and shows acute awareness of important Aotearoa/New Zealand issues while linking them in a complex way back to the cultural past. For example, in the poetic narrative Star Waka (1999) Sullivan uses traditional Māori story-telling techniques (oral tradition) in order to confront topics from Aotearoa/New Zealand with European concepts within a "critical space of contemporary cultural politics". This approach allows him to study the identity relation between Māori and Pākehā within transcultural themes of voyaging, personal and national, of the poet and of Māori. In a sense, the poems in Star Waka "themselves function like a waka".

Together with Albert Wendt and Reina Whaitiri, he has co-edited several important anthologies of Polynesian and Māori poetry. For example, the collection Whetu Moana (2002) can be regarded as a pioneering book due to its significance as "the first anthology of contemporary Polynesian poetry in English edited by Polynesians."

Sullivan works as "one of the editors of the online journal trout since its foundation in 1997." Trout is a journal that focuses on "poetry, prose, reviews, interviews, photography and artwork of or about New Zealand and/or Pacific writers and artists."

== Critical reception ==
Among Sullivan's eleven books features the bestselling Star Waka (1999), reprinted five times and shortlisted in 2000 for the Montana New Zealand Book Awards. Maui: Legends of the Outcast (1997), illustrated by Chris Slane and "one of New Zealand's first graphic novels", was shortlisted for the LIANZA Russell Clark Medal. His book-length poem Captain Cook in the Underworld was long-listed for the Montana New Zealand Book Awards in the Poetry Category. It was originally commissioned as the libretto for an oratorio by noted composer John Psathas which has been performed at the Wellington and Auckland Town Halls by the New Zealand Symphony Orchestra and the Orpheus Choir of Wellington. His first collection, Jazz Waiata, won the PEN (NZ) Best First Book Award, and his children's retelling of Māori myths and legends, Weaving Earth and Sky, illustrated by Gavin Bishop, won the non-fiction category and was Children's Book of the Year in the 2003 New Zealand Post Children's Book Awards.

Sullivan's Shout Ha! to the Sky (2010) was described by Paula Green in the New Zealand Herald as "a stunning symphony of love, politics, tenderness, confession, sharpness and insight", which "should be in every school library and accompany the journey of any reader drawn to the history and politics of where we come from and who we are". She described his collection Cassino (2010), which paid tribute to those who died and fought at the Battle of Monte Cassino during World War II, as again highlighting his "wide-ranging voice" and being "sumptuous in content yet simple in execution".

The Polynesian poetry anthology Whetu Moana won the Reference and Anthology category in the 2004 Montana New Zealand Book Awards. The Māori poetry anthology Puna Wai Kōrero was the winner of the 2015 Creative Writing category in the Ngā Kupu Ora Māori Book Awards.

His Hopurangi – Songcatcher was a finalist for the Mary and Peter Biggs Award for Poetry at the 2025 Ockham New Zealand Book Awards.

== Literary works ==
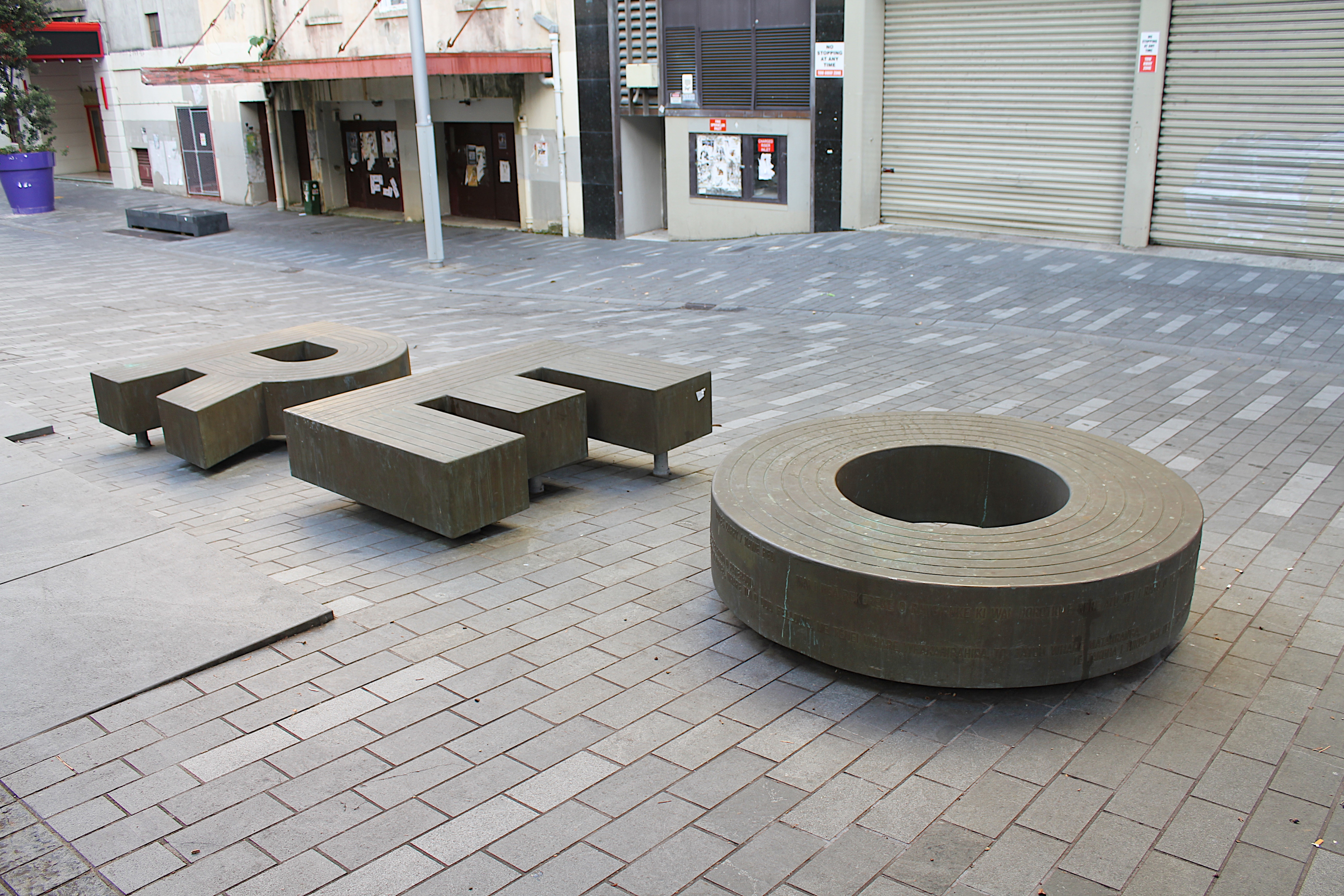
Kawe Reo / Voices Carry, a 2011 sculptural bench outside the Auckland Central City Library that incorporates poetry by Sullivan

Authored:

- Jazz Waiata (1990)
- Piki Ake!: Poems 1990–92 (1993)
- Maui – Legends of the Outcast (1996)
- Star Waka (1999; German translation: Sternen-Waka, 2012)
- Weaving Earth and Sky : Myths & Legends of Aotearoa (2002)
- Captain Cook in the Underworld (2002)
- Voice Carried My Family (2005)
- Shout Ha! to the Sky (2010)
- Cassino: City of Martyrs (2010)
- Tūnui | Comet (2022)
- Hopurangi―Songcatcher: Poems from the Maramataka (2024)

Edited:

- Wendt, Albert; Whaitiri, Reina; Sullivan, Robert, eds. (December 2002). Whetu Moana: Contemporary Polynesian Poetry in English. Auckland University Press. ISBN 9781869402730.
- Wendt, Albert; Whaitiri, Reina; Sullivan, Robert, eds. (September 2010). Mauri Ola: Contemporary Polynesian Poems in English (Whetu Moana II). Auckland: Auckland University Press. ISBN 9781869404482.
- Whaitiri, Reina; Sullivan, Robert, eds. (September 2014). Puna Wai Kōrero: An Anthology of Māori Poetry in English. Auckland University Press. ISBN 9781869408176.
- Newman, Janet; Sullivan, Robert, eds. (2024). Koe: an Aotearoa ecopoetry anthology. Otago University Press. ISBN 9781990048814.

Cultural offices
Preceded by Chris Tse	New Zealand Poet Laureate; 2025–present	Incumbent
