= Reina Whaitiri =

New Zealand scholar and editor (born 1943)

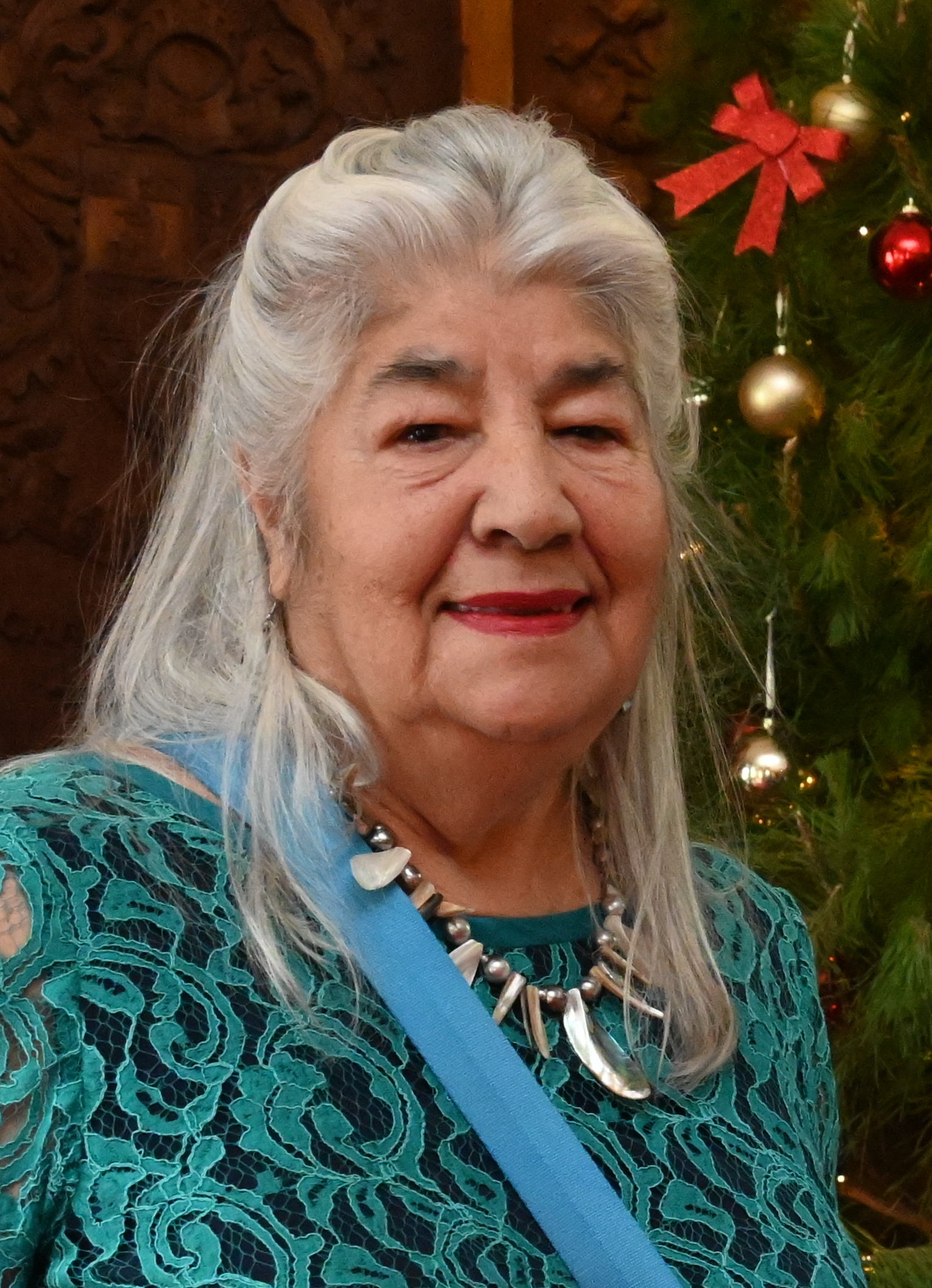
- Whaitiri in 2021
- Born: Reina Ann Whaitiri; 1943 (age 82–83); New Zealand
- Occupations: Scholar; poet; essayist; editor; researcher
- Notable work: Co-editor of Whetu Moana: Contemporary Polynesian Poems in English (2003)
- Partner: Albert Wendt

Reina Ann Whaitiri (born 1943) is a New Zealand scholar, poet, essayist, editor and researcher. She taught English literature at the University of Auckland and at the University of Hawaiʻi at Mānoa for many years, and has co-edited several notable anthologies of Polynesian writing, including Whetu Moana: Contemporary Polynesian Poems in English (2003), which received the Reference and Anthology award in the 2004 Montana New Zealand Book Awards.

== Early life, education and family ==
Whaitiri was born in 1943 and is of Kāi Tahu and Pākehā descent. Her father Bob Whaitiri was part of the Māori Battalion. She grew up in Rotorua, attended St Mary's Diocesan School, Stratford and subsequently St Hilda's Collegiate School in Dunedin. After having a son during a short early marriage, she spent time travelling overseas and learning languages, including four years in Germany. On returning to New Zealand, she obtained her bachelor's and master's degrees in arts at the University of Auckland, followed by a teaching diploma. She has been the partner of New Zealand writer Albert Wendt since the early 1990s.

== Career ==
Whaitiri taught English literature at the University of Auckland for fourteen years and as an assistant professor at the University of Hawaiʻi at Mānoa for four years, until her retirement in 2008. Together with Linda Tuhiwai Smith she edited a journal of Māori women's writing, Te Pua, published in three volumes between 1992 and 1994.

Together with Albert Wendt and Robert Sullivan, Whaitiri co-edited the poetry anthologies Whetu Moana: Contemporary Polynesian Poems in English (2003, Auckland University Press) and Mauri Ola: Contemporary Polynesian Poems in English (2010, Auckland University Press). Whetu Moana was notable as being the first anthology of contemporary Polynesian poetry in English to have Polynesian editors. In reviewing Whetu Moana for the New Zealand Review of Books, Cilla McQueen compared the anthology to a moving waka, and said, "Pacific rhythms underlie the language giving aural cohesion to the whole with their beat and energy". The British Review of New Zealand Studies said it "represents an important addition to the field of Pacific literature", and World Literature Today called it an " exciting, varied, carefully produced anthology, with a wealth of recent poetry illustrating concerns of present Polynesia, with political and cultural overtones".

Whetu Moana received the Reference and Anthology award at the 2004 Montana New Zealand Book Awards. The judge's comments called it a "substantial, important and historically significant book". Before the ceremony, The Press described it as likely to be "clear winner" of its category, noting that it "breaks new ground by energetically exploring the new voices of the Pacific". Iain Sharp writing in the Sunday Star-Times also predicted it as a winner, describing it as "innovative" and "big-selling".

Whaitiri and Sullivan co-edited Puna Wai Kōrero: An Anthology of Māori Poetry in English (2014). Anahera Gildea, reviewing the anthology for the New Zealand Review of Books, said it "is not only a short course in recent Māori political and social history, it is also a short course in poetry itself"; her review concluded: "This is a work of history; a collection of cultural pioneers who have been forced to bestride two radically different cultures." It received the Creative Writing (Te Tuhinga Auaha) award at the Ngā Kupu Ora Māori Book Awards in 2015.

Whaitiri has contributed essays to several publications, including an essay about her childhood for Growing Up Māori (edited by Witi Ihimaera, 1998, Tandem Press), an essay about Māori literature for State of the Maori Nation: twenty-first century issues in Aotearoa (2006, Reed) an essay about the struggles of Polynesian women for Whispers and Vanities: Samoan Indigenous Knowledge and Religion (2014, Huia Publishers), and an essay on Pacific Island fairy tales for Folktales and Fairy Tales: Traditions and Texts from Around the World (2016, Greenwood).
