= Waihorotiu Stream =

Historic Auckland stream

Coordinates: 36°51′15″S 174°45′44″E

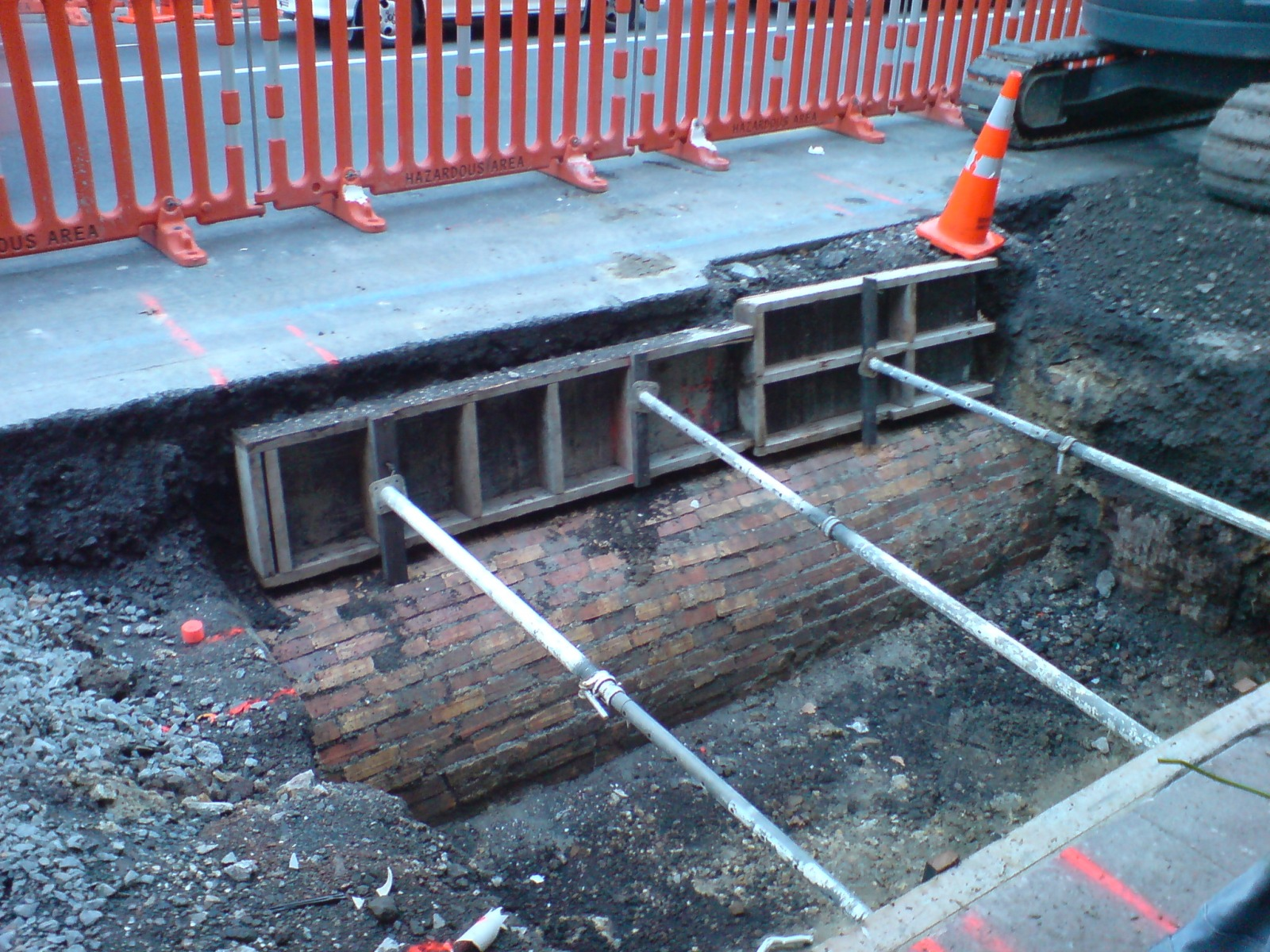
The Waihorotiu Stream – now channelled into brick sewers underneath Queen Street.

Approximate route of the stream

Waihorotiu (from the Māori Wai Horotiu), sometimes called the Waihorotiu Stream and the 'Queen Street River', is a stream that ran down the Queen Street gully in the Auckland CBD, New Zealand, into the Waitemata Harbour. It has long since been covered over and put underground by the urbanisation of the area.

== History ==
Originally this was an open stream that was one of the tributaries of the Waitemata River, now submerged by rising sea levels in the Waitematā Harbour. The Waihorotiu carved out the Queen Street valley millions of years ago. The upper part of that valley now forms Myers Park. The references to a spring feeding the stream in the area of the Baptist Tabernacle in Myers Park are problematic (no historical document references this and if a spring existed it is unlikely it would have been built over). The stream ran through a swampy area (now Aotea Square), formed when lava flows from the Albert Park Volcano blocked the flow of the Waihorotiu Stream approximately 145,000 years ago. From here, it flowed northwards between Queen and Elliot Streets until the vicinity of Victoria Street, where, emerging behind the Courthouse, it flowed down into what is now the lower part of Queen Street. It entered the harbour at what is now called Fort Street but in the early colonial period was called Fore Street, a shortened form of Foreshore. The lower reaches of the stream above the Fort Street will have been tidal; doubtless pre-European Māori fished in this area.

The swampy area now occupied by Aotea Square was probably used to trap birds and possibly eels. A side tributary (occupying the gully between Wellesley and Airedale Streets) possibly provided drinking water for both Māori villages and the first European colonists of Auckland, although the still existing Spring just to the north of Waterloo Quadrant (later utilised by the Grey & Menzies Mineral Water Company) may have been preferred as more reliable. The stream flowed into Horotiu Bay (called Commercial Bay after European settlement). In Māori mythology, the stream is the home of Horotiu, a taniwha (roughly speaking, a local nature spirit).

Initially European settlement of the central area tended to be on the Shortland Street rise and the Albert Park Hill area. However, as the population grew the Queen Street valley began to fill up with buildings, partly due to a big fire in the Shortland Street area. An open stream in the centre of the road created problems especially in a period before any sewerage system was in operation. The sides of the stream crumbled in wet weather and there were only a few place to cross (sometimes just plank walkways), resulting in people and carriages periodically tumbling into the river. The river was used as a source for well water, however had become heavily polluted by the mid-1860s.

Around the middle of the century the Surveyor General Charles Ligar attempted to regulate the stream by building sound walls to constrict its waters (this was referred to as the Ligar Canal). This proved inadequate (being called "an abomination, a pestiferous ditch, and the receptacle of every imaginable filth") and eventually the stream was bricked over in the form of a sewer – water percolating through the soil under Myers Park still runs into the old drain under Queen Street to the sea, discharging under the Ferry Building. A sewer east of the canal began construction in 1854, however progress was slow, and eventually it was completed in 1873. Citizens of Auckland were unhappy with sewage being delivered directly into the ports of Auckland, and by March 1914 a sewage plant at Ōkahu Bay in Ōrākei was opened, directing the city's sewage further east along the Waitematā Harbour.

In 1990, artist Selwyn Muru unveiled Waharoa, a sculptural gateway at the entrance of Aotea Square in Auckland. A haiku by poet Hone Tuwhare is carved into the piece, which discusses the Waihorotiu Stream. In 2011, a local artist proposed that, as part of the Council's city centre masterplan, the stream be uncovered and become a centrepiece of a more people-friendly inner city.

== See also ==
- Tank Stream, Sydney
