= Barry Lett Galleries =

New Zealand art gallery

- The Barry Lett Galleries pictured in the early 1970s
- Interactive map of the Barry Lett Galleries area

General information
- Location: Victoria Street West, Auckland CBD
- Coordinates: 36°50′55″S 174°45′50″E

Barry Lett Galleries was a dealer gallery focused on contemporary New Zealand art that operated in Auckland in the 1960s and 1970s.

== History ==
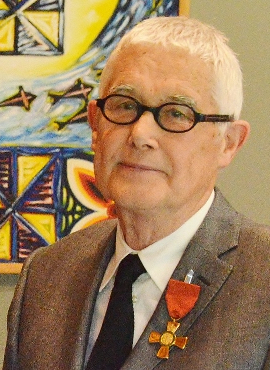
Barry Lett in 2015

Barry Lett Galleries was opened in 1965 by Barry Lett (1940–2017), who had graduated from Elam School of Fine Arts the previous year, Rodney Kirk Smith (1938-1996), and Frank Lowe, who had run Ikon Gallery with fellow architecture student Don Wood from 1960 to 1964.

In the early 1960s a new generation of dealer galleries (often short-lived) arose in Auckland, encouraging people to see and buy contemporary New Zealand art. Barry Lett Galleries filled a gap left in the Auckland cultural scene by the closure of Ikon Gallery (which had shown, among others, Colin McCahon, Don Binney and Pat Hanly), as did Kees and Tina Hos's New Vision Gallery.

Barry Lett Galleries showed many of the leading painters of the 1960s and 1970s, including McCahon, Binney, Hanly, Milan Mrkusich, Gordon Walters, Ralph Hotere, Michael Smither, Rosemary Johnson, Michael Illingworth, Robert Ellis and Roy Good. Unlike most commercial galleries, Barry Lett Gallery also showed the work of 'post-object' artist Jim Allen and his students at the Elam School of Fine Arts, such as Leon Narbey.

In 1975 the gallery celebrated its tenth anniversary with a show of two works each by 14 of its core artists, including McCahon, Binney, Hotere, Mrkusich, Illingworth and Teuane Tibbo.

Frank Lowe sold his interest to Kim Wright in 1966, and in 1975 Barry Lett left the gallery to paint full-time, leaving Rodney Kirk-Smith. In 1976 the gallery became known as RKS Art. RKS Art operated until July 1992.

== Barry Lett multiples ==
In 1968 the gallery issued a set of prints by 12 of its artists: Binney, McCahon, Walters, Mrkusich, Illingworth, Hotere, Hanly, Ellis, Michael Smither, Mervyn Williams, Ross Ritchie, and Toss Woollaston. The prints were intended to make contemporary art more accessible to the public, and were priced at $35 before publication and $40 after. Lett selected the twelve to reflect an 'up and coming' generation of new artists; the prints were not numbered but between 200 and 250 editions were believed to have been produced.

== Artists ==
Artists shown at Barry Lett Galleries include:

- Gretchen Albrecht
- Don Binney
- Linda Buis
- Paul Cullen
- Robert Ellis
- Suzanne Goldberg
- Roy Good
- Pat Hanly
- Ralph Hotere
- Michael Illingworth
- Tom Kreisler
- Vivian Lynn
- David Mealing
- Selwyn Muru
- Milan Mrkusich
- Leon Narbey
- Don Peebles
- John Perry
- Ross Ritchie
- Peter Roche
- Michael Smither
- Paul Tangata
- Geoff Thornley
- Teuane Tibbo
- M.T. Woollaston
