= Michael Illingworth =

New Zealand painter (1932–1988)

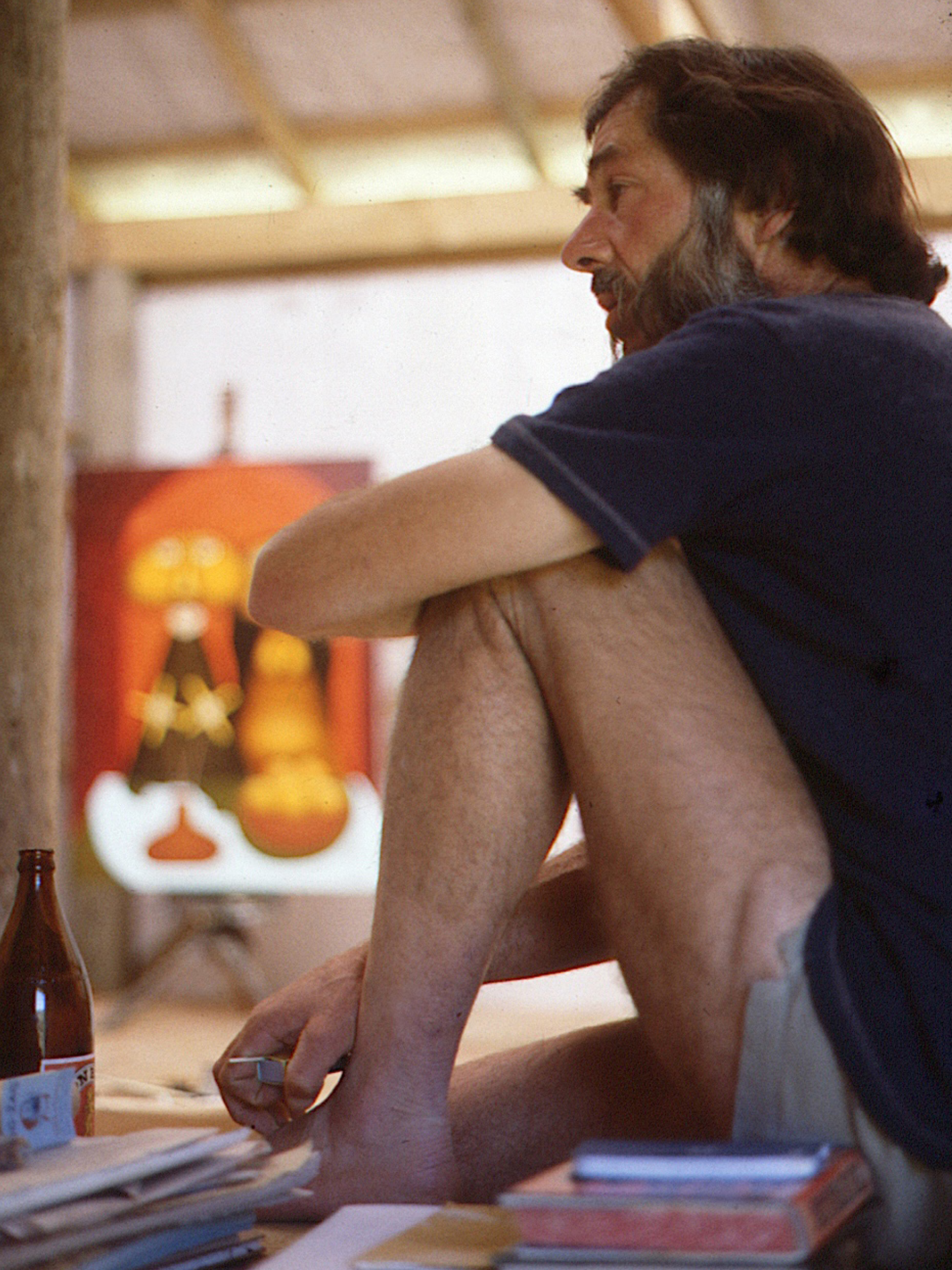
- Michael Illingworth in his Coroglen studio, 1979
- Born: 3 August 1932; Yorkshire
- Died: 15 July 1988 (aged 55)
- Known for: Painting and sculpture
- Notable work: Adam and Eve
- Style: Modernist
- Spouse: Dene

Michael Harland Illingworth (3 August 1932 – 15 July 1988) was a New Zealand painter and farmer.

== Life and times ==
Michael Illingworth was born in Yorkshire and emigrated with his family to Tauranga in the early 1950s when he was 20 working as a photographer and photoengraver in Auckland. In 1959 he returned to the UK. Through a chain of New Zealand connections (the writer Kevin Ireland was also in London and knew the UK art dealer John Kasmin who had lived in New Zealand from 1951 to 1956). Kasmin recommended Illingworth for a job with the dealer Victor Musgrove who ran Gallery One. While working for Musgrove Illingworth was influenced by a number of the gallery's artists including Enrico Baj and John Christoforou.

Another of the artists, Francis Souza, convinced Illingworth to leave his job at the gallery and become a full-time painter. In 1960 Illingworth did just that and left the UK to spend time painting in Paris and Greece. The next year he returned to New Zealand determined to continue as a full-time artist, a rare occupation in New Zealand at the time. His work was deeply informed by the artists he had met and seen overseas. As the critic T J McNamara noted, "Illingworth brought back from a stay in London a lot of ideas about contemporary art, particularly the theories and practice of Jean Dubuffet about untrained spontaneity, the incorporation of sand and plaster into paintings and the value of naïve art".

In the year of his return Illingworth had his first solo exhibition. The critic for The New Zealand Herald summed up what would be the response to Illingworth's art for most of his painting life, ‘Here is an exhibition so removed from our recent diet of landscapes that it will make traditionalists shudder and iconoclasts whoop with joy.’ In 1963 he married Dene White who had studied at the Elam School of Fine Arts and, although income from his work was to prove illusive, Illingworth built a reputation as a painter with exceptionally high standards. As fellow painter and friend Don Binney observed, he had a ‘professional contempt for compromise’ and brought ‘scrupulous dedication to his work’ This was recognised in 1966 when he became the first recipient of the University of Otago's Frances Hodgkins Fellowship and he and his wife Dene travelled to Dunedin. The fellowship did not end happily as the university struggled to find suitable studio space and the year-long residency was cut short.

The Illingworths returned to Auckland, at first living in Puhoi, and then in 1973 moving to Coroglen near Whitianga on the Coromandel Peninsula where he painted and farmed until his death in 1988.

== The paintings ==
Illingworth was best known for his landscapes often peopled by small large headed figures. In describing them he said, ‘I'm painting a little world of my own in a little world of my own. I'm building a facade for my own world, against the established facade, the facade of hypocritical suburbia.' The paintings often expressed Illingworth’s alarm at urban sprawl and the increasing human damage to the natural world. Curator Robert Leonard described Illingworth’s paintings as ‘sub-divided, framed up into discrete sections: dividing nature, suburb, city, work, love. A repeated motif is a row of identical houses with no doorways…Illingworth suggests an affinity between the suburb dweller and the primitive.’

Kevin Ireland described Illingworth's position as ‘a mass of contradictions …He loved the place [New Zealand] but he despised so much about New Zealand society. He antagonised everyone and yet he was the most generous and kind person underneath it all. For Illingworth the whole process of painting was one of emotionally focussed, passionate creativity. ‘Painting is sometimes a joy, sometimes an agony. Sometimes I get into a wild frenzy and hurl things at my paintings. . . .But something will evolve from this fury . . . . I never plan a painting. It unrolls as I go along. It just happens.’

== Selected exhibitions ==
=== Solo ===
1961 M. H. Illingworth New Vision Craft Centre, Auckland

1962 Illingworth Ikon Gallery, Auckland

1963 Illingworth: An Exhibition of Recent Work Ikon Gallery, Auckland,

1965 Illingworth: An Exhibition of Recent Work Barry Lett Galleries

1967 Paintings With No Titles to Obey Barry Lett Galleries, Auckland

1969 Eleven Paintings Peter McLeavey Gallery, Wellington

1971 Paintings and Constructions by Michael Illingworth Barry Lett Galleries

1971 Michael Illingworth Victoria University of Wellington

Illingworth exhibited with the Barry Lett Galleries to 1975 when Peter McLeavey became the artist's sole dealer. In 1984 Illingworth had his last solo exhibition in his life-time at the Peter McLeavey Gallery.

=== Group ===
1966 New Zealand Painting 1966 (toured) Auckland City Art Gallery

1966 The Group Durham Street Gallery, Christchurch

1967 10 Years of New Zealand Painting in Auckland, 1958–1967 Auckland City Art Gallery

1970 Contemporary Painting in New Zealand (toured) Smithsonian Institution, Washington

1970 The Kim Wright Collection of New Zealand Painting (toured) Govett-Brewster Art Gallery

1971 Earth/Earth (group) Barry Lett Galleries

1992 Headlands: Thinking Through New Zealand Art (toured) Museum of Contemporary Art, Sydney

2001 Michael Illingworth A Tourist in Paradise Lost City Gallery (toured), Wellington

== Controversies ==
The year before taking up the Frances Hodgkins Fellowship in 1966, Illingworth was embroiled in a censorship row. In his 1965 exhibition at the Barry Lett Galleries Illingworth included As Adam and Eve a painting of the Biblical couple naked with exposed genitals. A number of complaints brought the police to the exhibition and the gallery director Barry Lett was asked to remove the work. He refused to do so. The police photographed the painting and the gallery and sent the photographs to the Attorney General, who after considering the request instructed the police to take no further action, although by the time this decision was made the exhibition had already finished. As art writer Warren Feeney wrote, ‘Lett's insistence on the gallery's right to display the work of the artists that it represented was a public declaration that the visual arts were an important form of communication founded upon the knowledge of professionals, not the criticisms and opinions of the general public.’ In 1975 Adam and Eve caused a further uproar when it was removed from the Pakuranga Arts Centre after complaints by the public. Eventually the work was purchased by Te Papa at the 2012 auction of the Les and Milly Paris Family collection. The Paris's had purchased the work from Illingworth's solo exhibition at the Peter McLeavey Gallery in 1975. Another event in Illingworth's career that has attracted attention was the purchase of 17 paintings by a single collector from his 1967 Barry Lett Galleries exhibition. Illingworth response to the sale? ‘At least it will mean I can stop living in squalor.’

== Friendship with the poet James K Baxter ==
James K Baxter and Illingworth first met in Auckland soon after Illingworth's arrival in New Zealand in the early fifties. The move to Dunedin in 1966 to take up the Frances Hodgkins Fellowship, reunited Illingworth with Baxter who was the Robert Burns Fellow at the time. The two men remained close friends for life. In 1972 Baxter arrived at the Illingworth's Puhoi home on Monday 16 October and stayed for four days. The morning he left Baxter wrote his final published poem Ode to Auckland at their dining table. The poem included the lines: ‘The Auckland Art School gives me a pain in both testicles / They don’t like the best of Illingworth / They admire the worst of McCahon.’ Three days later Baxter died in Auckland of a heart attack. He was 46.

== Final days ==
Michael Illingworth died in at his home in Coroglen in 1988. In 2017 the paintings in his estate were sold at auction.

== Collections ==
Auckland Art Gallery Toi o Tāmaki

Te Papa Tongarewa Museum of New Zealand

Christchurch Art Gallery

Govett-Brewster Art Gallery, New Plymouth

Te Manawa, Palmerston North

Sarjeant Gallery, Whanganui

The Fletcher Collection
