= Suzanne Goldberg =

New Zealand painter (1940–1999)

- crop of self portrait
- Born: 1940; Auckland, New Zealand
- Died: 1999 (aged 58–59)
- Education: Elam School of Fine Arts
- Known for: painting
- Notable work: Landscape (1964), Life (1960), BDG No 1
- Movement: Abstract
- Awards: Queen Elizabeth II Arts Council Grant
- Patrons: Barry Lett

Suzanne Goldberg (1940–1999) was a New Zealand painter, born in Auckland, New Zealand.

== Education ==
Goldberg graduated from Elam School of Fine Arts in 1961 with honours and awarded the Joe Raynes Scholarship in her final year. At Elam, she studied alongside Don Binney, Michael Smither, Lynley Dodd, Greer Twiss, Malcolm Warr, and Graham Percy.

In 1965 she received a Queen Elizabeth II Arts Council Grant which allowed her to travel to the United Kingdom and attend the Hornsey College of Art.

== Career ==
Goldberg's paintings combined approaches to abstract and representational art. She experimented with painting techniques and effects including washing paint off with turpentine; a process called decalcomania (also used by the Surrealists), in which paper is used to apply paint by taking impressions from paint layered on board.

Known for landscapes of New Zealand, Goldberg has also painted portraits. Well known works include Landscape (1964), Life (1960) and BDG No 1 (1969). Her paintings of birds were featured in James McNeish's book An Albatross Too Many.

=== Exhibitions ===
In 1961, Goldberg exhibited with The Group, an informal art association from Christchurch, New Zealand, that formed to provide a freer alternative to the Canterbury Society of Arts. Goldberg's first solo show was in 1962, an exhibition entitled "Two New Names" (also exhibiting with Pat Hanly). In 1963, three of her paintings were included in the Auckland City Art Gallery's Contemporary New Zealand Painting exhibition. She was one of fifteen New Zealand artists to have their work selected for the 1965 Commonwealth exhibition in London. Goldberg also exhibited at the Auckland Art Gallery Toi o Tāmaki. In 1999 the Dowse Museum, in Lower Hutt, hosted a major retrospective of Goldberg's art.

Fellow artist Barry Lett promoted her work, including her in exhibitions at the Barry Lett Galleries.

=== Collections ===
Several different places have kept designs that she made. Pieces by Goldberg are owned by the Museum of New Zealand Te Papa Tongarewa, Auckland Art Gallery, University of Auckland, Victoria University of Wellington, the Ford Motor Company and New Zealand consulates in Washington, Tokyo, New York and Canberra.
