= Waharoa (Aotea Square sculpture) =

Public sculpture in New Zealand

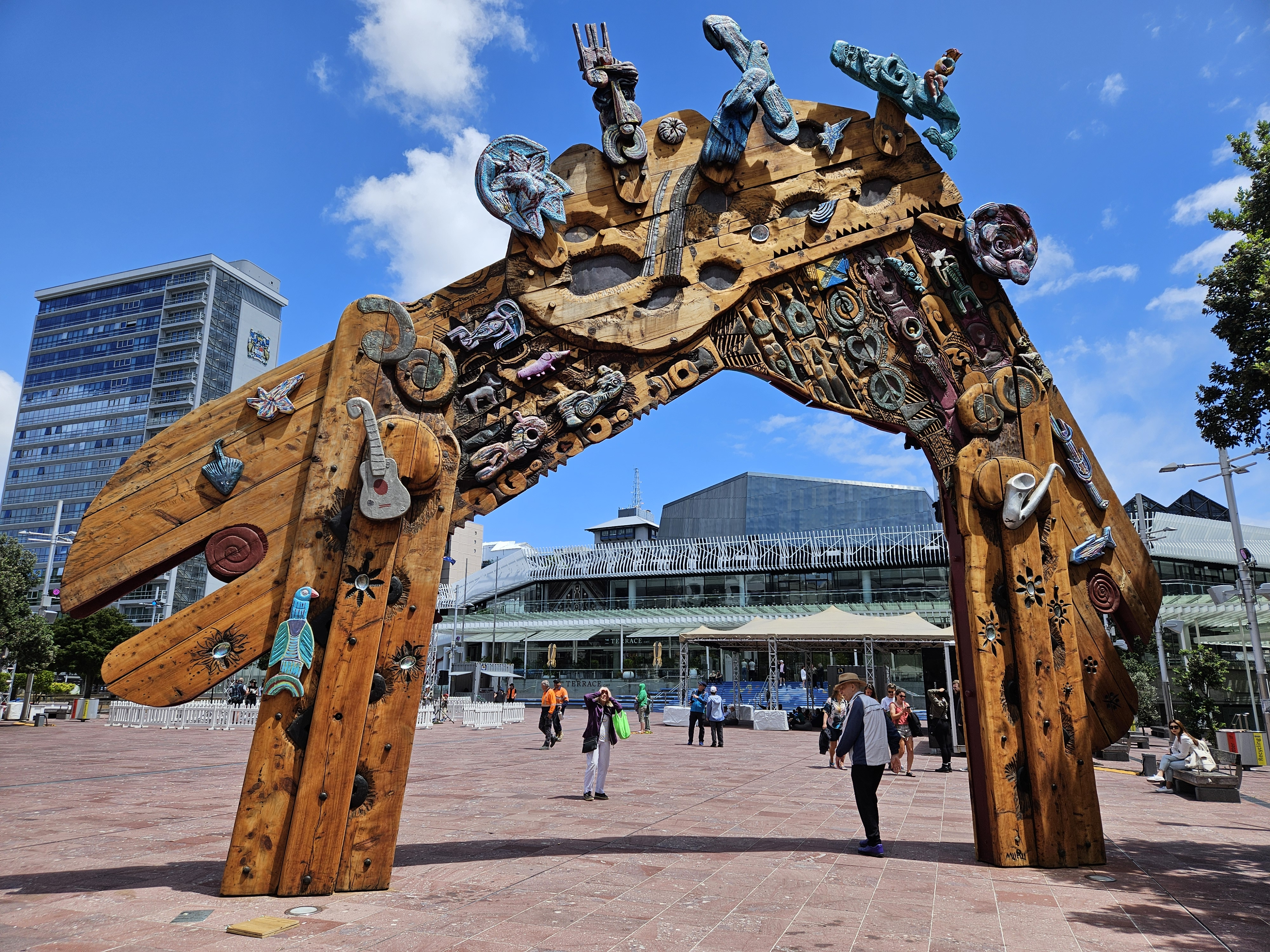
- Waharoa at the entrance to Aotea Square
- Artist: Selwyn Muru
- Completion date: 1990
- Medium: Macrocarpa wood, copper, pāua shell, steel armature
- Dimensions: 7 m × 0.62 m × 10.132 m (280 in × 24 in × 398.9 in)
- Location: Auckland, New Zealand; 36°51′07″S 174°45′48″E
- Owner: Auckland Council Art Collection
- Website: Auckland Public Art page

Waharoa, also known as Te Waharoa o Aotea, is a public sculpture located in Aotea Square, the city centre of Auckland, New Zealand. The expressionist piece was designed by Selwyn Muru and depicts a waharoa, a traditional Māori gateway in front of a marae ātea; the open meeting courtyard at a marae. Muru took elements from traditional Māori and Pacific art forms, as well as contemporary elements. The work was erected at Aotea Square in 1990 and relocated to its current position in 2010. Artist Mei Hill has described Waharoa as "probably the defining Māori artwork of scale in Auckland".

== Commission ==
Waharoa was one of seven artworks commissioned in 1988 during the construction of the Aotea Centre and redevelopment of Aotea Square, alongside other artworks such as The Aotea Tapestry by Robert Ellis, Red Dancer (1990) by Barry Lett, and Metal and Wood Sculpture (1990) by Paratene Matchitt.

== Design and construction ==
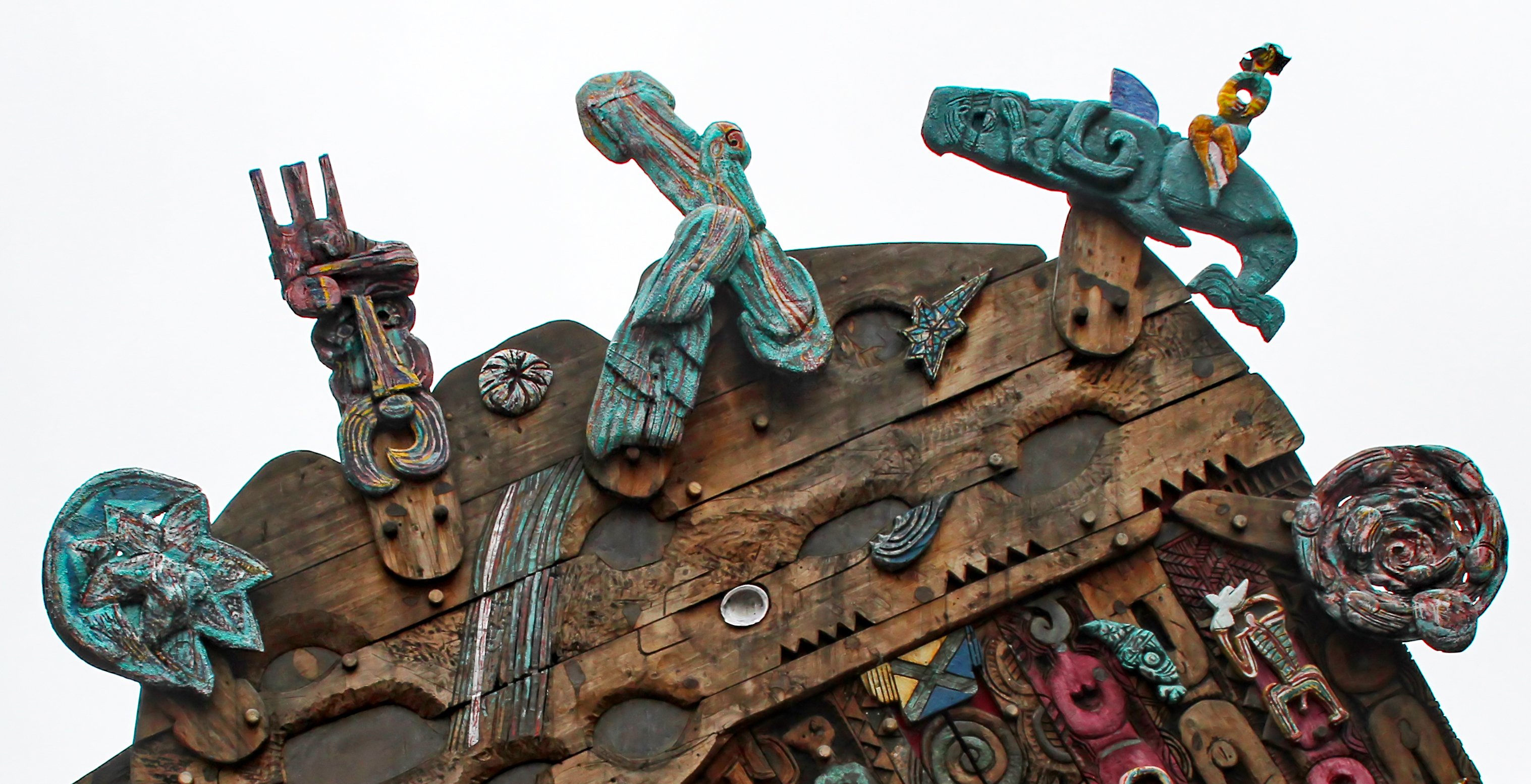
Detail on the depictions on Waharoa (from left): Whetu me te Mārama (stars and the moon), Tāwhirimātea, Tāne Mahuta (depicted as a bird), Tangaroa (depicted as a whale) and Tamanuiterā

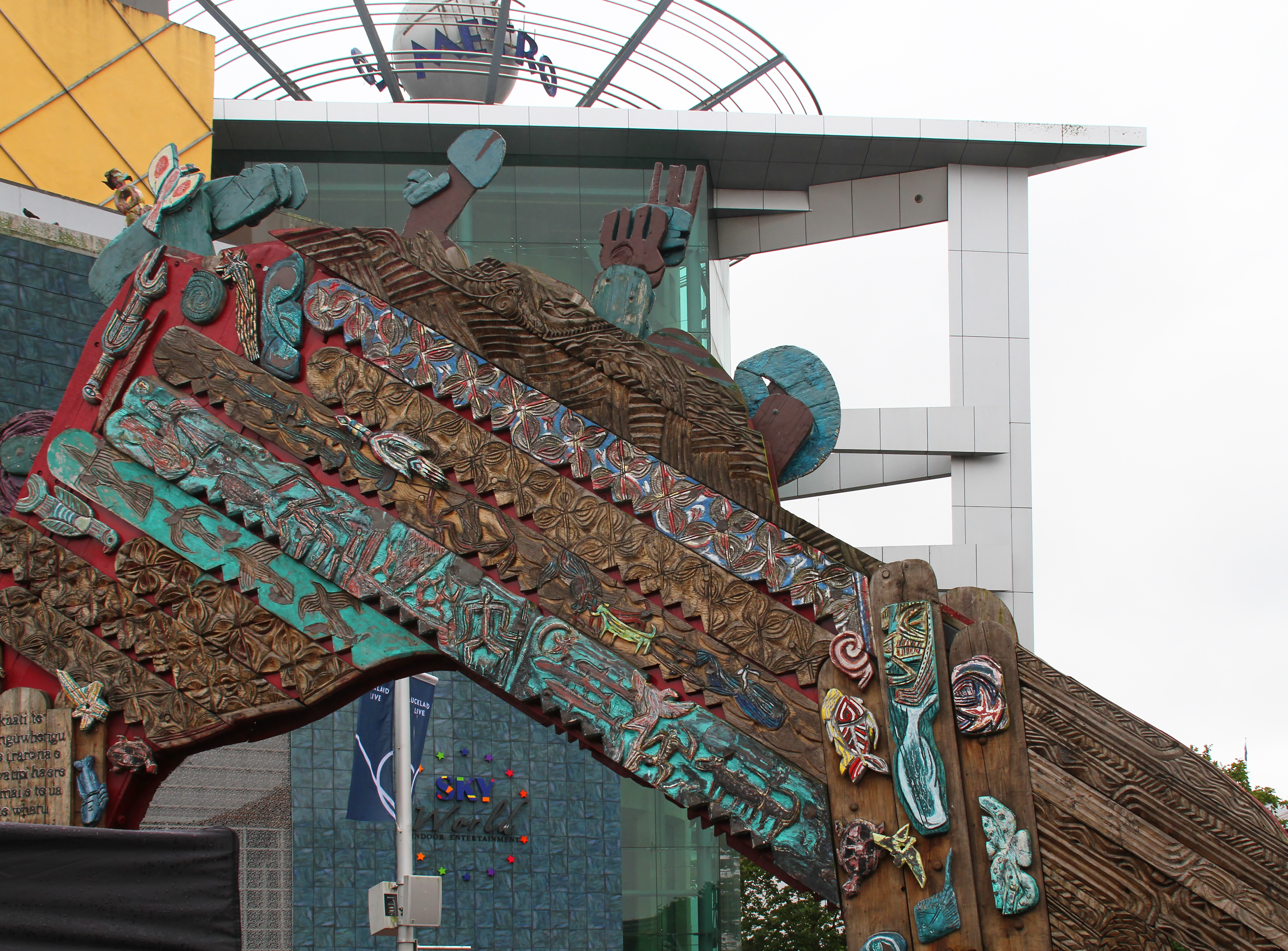
Reverse view of Waharoa, showing tapa cloth inspired patterns

Waharoa (English: "Gateway" or "Entrance") is a seven-metre-high (23 ft) archway that incorporates carvings of musical instruments, animals, representations of Māori deities and poetry. It is an expressionist interpretation of a waharoa, a gateway to a marae, and its location at the entrance to Aotea Square was chosen as a way to metaphorically transform the square into a marae ātea, or meeting courtyard at a Polynesian marae. Muru saw the placement as a way to welcome manuhiri (visitors) to the space, akin to how a visiting party is welcomed onto a marae.

Muru chose macrocarpa wood as the medium because of its mauri (life force), contrasting with the surrounding artificial cityscape, carving the piece using a chainsaw and chisel. He requisitioned pieces of copper from the historic Waitangi wharf piles in Northland, which he treated with vinegar to create a green verdigris effect. Muru chose to use this copper to link to his birthplace in Northland and as an acknowledgement of the God of the Sea, Tangaroa.

The archway depicts four Māori deities: Tamanuiterā (God of the Sun), Tangaroa (God of the Sea) depicted as a whale, Tāne Mahuta (god of the forest) depicted as a bird, and Tāwhirimātea, God of Weather, as well as Whetū me te Mārama, the stars and moon. Additional contemporary symbols are found on the artwork, including the nuclear disarmament symbol, a Christian cross, a love heart symbol, an arrow, a guitar, and a dog, inspired by fellow artist Paratene Matchitt's dog. Muru took inspiration from Polynesian tapa cloth patterns and 19th-century Māori carving when creating the designs. A haiku written by poet Hone Tuwhare is inscribed on Waharoa, alongside a Māori language version, translated by Muru himself. The haiku references the Waihorotiu Stream, which formerly flowed down the Queen Street gully.

When asked about the inspiration behind the work, Muru said, "Pēnā ka riro māku nei e whakamārama, kāore e tika taku mahi" ("If I needed to explain it, I did not do it correctly.").

== History ==
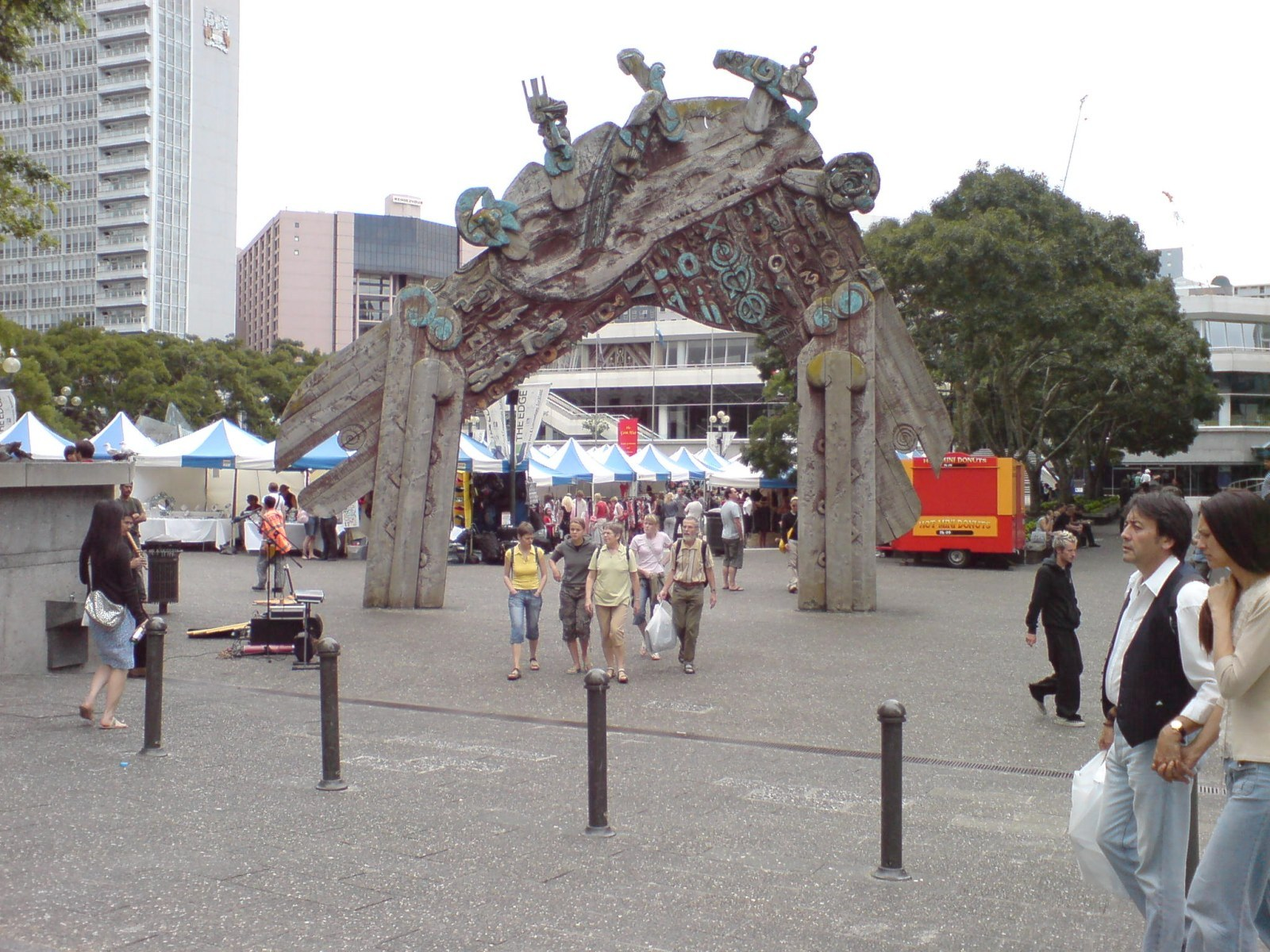
Waharoa seen in 2007

The artwork was constructed in 1989 and unveiled at Aotea Square in 1990. In 1993, Muru dedicated Waharoa to his friend and colleague Emeritus Professor George W. Parkyn at his funeral in Auckland. In 2008, it was removed for storage as Aotea Square underwent renewal. It was returned to the square in October 2010.

An unveiling ceremony was held when the artwork was returned. The ceremony was attended by politician Hone Harawira, Mayor of Auckland City John Banks, and Muru himself.

In December 2010, after only three months, the artwork was found to be leaning, and removed for refurbishment a second time at a cost of NZ$40,000. The replacement was delayed from June to August 2011, and the Auckland Council ensured that the work was reinstated in time for the opening ceremony of the 2011 Rugby World Cup, held in Auckland.

In late 2023, the artwork underwent further remedial work, which included a 3D laser scan, ensuring a digital record could be kept of Waharoa. Some smaller sections of the artwork have been removed for restoration, and were planned to be returned in April 2024.

Over time, Waharoa has become one of the most viewed public artworks in Auckland.

== Reception ==
Art historian Michael Dunn described Waharoa the "best-known sculpture" by Muru, believing that Waharoa "has a bold, free style of execution" that eschewed tropes of Māori art that Dunn saw as associated with the tourism industry and souvenirs. Dun praises the sculpture as having "mana, pride and grandeur", and sees it as a work that "symbolises which has been called the Māori art renaissance."

Brooke Bath of Stuff called Waharoa "easily one of Auckland's most recognisable pieces of public art", believing it created a "welcoming sense of arrival and a strong sense of place" in Aotea Square. Artist Mei Hill sees Waharoa as the "defining Māori artwork of scale" in Auckland, while design specialist Olivia Haddon believes that Waharoa's fusion of contemporary and traditional art styles makes the piece special.
