= Deidre Brown =

New Zealand art and architectural historian (born 1970)

Deidre Brown FRSNZ FNZIA
- Born: Deidre Sharon Brown; 1970 (age 55–56)
- Awards: NZSA E.H. McCormick Best First Book Award for Non-Fiction; NZIA Gold Medal

Academic background
- Education: University of Auckland
- Thesis: Mōrehu architecture (1997)

Academic work
- Discipline: Māori art and architecture
- Institutions: University of Canterbury; University of Auckland
- Website: www.creative.auckland.ac.nz/people/deidre-brown

Deidre Sharon Brown FRSNZ FNZIA (born 1970) is a New Zealand art historian and architectural academic. Brown currently teaches at the University of Auckland and is the Deputy Dean for the Faculty of Creative Arts and Industries. Additionally, she is a governor of the Arts Foundation of New Zealand, a member of the Māori Trademarks Advisory Committee of the Intellectual Property Office of New Zealand, and a member of the Humanities Panel of the Marsden Fund. In 2021, Brown was made a Fellow of the Royal Society Te Apārangi. In 2023, she became the first Māori woman and the first academic to receive the NZIA Gold Medal.

== Early life ==
Brown grew up in New Lynn, New Zealand, and is of Māori, Pākehā and English descent and affiliates with the Māori tribes Ngāpuhi and Ngāti Kahu.

== Career ==
Brown attended the University of Auckland for both her undergraduate and graduate degrees. In 1997, she completed her PhD at the University of Auckland. Her 1997 thesis was titled Mōrehu Architecture and focused on Māori architecture between the years 1850 and 1950. After completing her education, Brown began to focus on teaching her specialty of Māori art history and architecture at universities.

In 1998, Brown began her academic career at the University of Canterbury School of Fine Arts, where she was a lecturer in the art history department teaching Māori art history. In 2003, Brown returned to the University of Auckland where she taught design and history in the School of Architecture and Planning. She became a professor, with research interests in Māori architecture and art, the relationship of art and curatorship to architecture, and intersections between culture and technology. She has published a number of books about art and architecture that focus on her interests, specifically Māori art. Brown has also curated a number of exhibitions in galleries throughout New Zealand.

In 2019, Brown was appointed head of the School of Architecture and Planning. She is the first indigenous woman to head an architecture school.

Brown's main academic focus is the history of Māori art and architecture. Much of Brown's work discusses Māori culture, honing in on art and architecture.

== Publications ==
Brown has contributed and edited a variety of books connected to her interests of study. She is the co-author of A New Zealand Book of Beasts: Animals in our History, Culture and Everyday Life with Annie Potts and Philip Armstrong in which her chapters examine the significance of animals in Māori and Pākehā art. Brown also wrote a book titled Māori Architecture that explores the different Māori-designed structures and space and their evolution over time.

- 2024 Brown, D. S. and N. Ellis, with J. Mane-Wheoki, Toi Te Mana: An Indigenous History of Māori Art, Auckland University Press, Auckland.
- 2013 Brown, D. S., A. Potts and P. Armstrong, A New Zealand Book of Beasts: Animals in Our Culture, History and Everyday Life, Auckland University Press, Auckland.
- 2012 Brunt, P, S. Mallon, N. Thomas, D. S. Brown, S. Kuechler, L. Bolton and D. Skinner, Art in Oceania: A new history, Thames and Hudson & Yale University Press, London & New Haven.
- 2012 Brown, D. S. editor, Indigenising Knowledges for Current and Future Generations, Ngā Pae o te Māramatanga and Te Whare Kura, Auckland.
- 2009 Brown, D.S., Maori Architecture, Raupo (Penguin) Publishing, Auckland, 187p.
- 2007 Brown, D.S. and N. Ellis, editors, Te Puna: Maori art from Te Tai Tokerau Northland, Reed Publishing, Auckland, 160p.
- 2005 Brown, D. S., Introducing Maori Art, Reed Publishing, Auckland, 76p. Reprinted by Raupo (Penguin) Publishing.
- 2005 Brown, D.S. Maori Arts of the Gods, Reed Publishing, Auckland, 95p. Reprinted by Raupo (Penguin) Publishing.
- 2003 Brown, D.S. Tai Tokerau Whakairo Rakau: Northland Maori Wood Carving, Auckland, Reed Publishing, 248p.

== Awards ==
Brown has been widely recognised for her impactful and significant contributions to the art history world. In 2004, Brown's book Tai Tokerau Whakairo Rākau: Northland Māori Wood Carving won the NZSA E.H. McCormick Best First Book Award for Non-Fiction at the Montana New Zealand Book Awards. Art in Oceania: A new history received the 2013 Art Book Prize (Banister Fletcher Award) from the Authors' Club. Māori architecture: from fale to wharenui and beyond won the Art, Architecture and Design category in the 2009 Ngā Kupu Ora Māori Book Awards and was a finalist in the Illustrated Non-Fiction Category at the 2010 New Zealand Post Book Awards. In 2025, this book was listed in Books of Mana as one of the 180 most significant works of Māori-authored non-fiction. In 2021, Brown was made a Fellow of the Royal Society Te Apārangi. Brown was both the first Māori woman and the first academic to be awarded the NZIA Gold Medal, which she was awarded in 2023.

Awards Brown has received include:

- Illustrated non-fiction award, Ockham New Zealand Book Awards, with Ngarino Ellis and Jonathan Mane-Wheoki, for Toi Te Mana: An Indigenous History of Māori Art (2025)
- Art Book Prize (2014) for Art in Oceania: A new history for the best art or architecture book published in English anywhere in the world in 2013
- New Zealand Association for Research in Education (NZARE) Group Award (with five other investigators) for the Success for All: Improving Maori and Pasifika Success in Degree Level Studies project, 2012
- Fellowship, International Central Networking Fund (ICNF), to establish collaborative postgraduate teaching linkages with the University of British Columbia and University of Queensland, 2011
- Finalist, New Zealand Post Book Awards (Illustrated Non-Fiction category) for Māori Architecture, 2010
- New Zealand Institute of Architects National Awards President's Award for contribution to the institute and the profession of architecture, 2010
- Excellence in Equal Opportunity Award, University of Auckland, for Success for All: Improving Maori and Pasifika Success in Degree Level Studies project (with other investigators from NICAI, Education, Medical and Health Sciences, and Career Services), 2010
- Nga Kupu Ora Māori Book Award (Art, Design and Architecture section) for Māori Architecture; finalist in Nga Kupu Ora Māori Book Award (Book of the Decade) for Tai Tokerau Whakairo Rakau: Northland Maori Wood Carving, 2009
- Excellence in Equal Opportunity Award, University of Auckland, for NICAI Tuākana Research Assistants Workshop (with Dr Te Oti Rakena from Music, and Mona O'Shea and Matthew Tarawa from the Student Learning Centre), 2008
- Tertiary Teaching Excellence Award, University of Auckland, for Collaboration in Teaching (with Drs Diane Brand and Rosangela Tenorio), 2007.
- Innovation Award (for developing a ground-breaking project involving the arts) for the curation of LightSCAPE and Whare, Art and Industry Trust, 2004
- Montana New Zealand National Book Award (E. H. McCormick Prize, Best First Book by an Author, Non-Fiction) for Tai Tokerau Whakairo Rakau: Northland Māori Wood Carving, 2004
