= Ngarino Ellis =

New Zealand academic, university teacher, art historian and writer (born 1970)

Professor Ngarino Ellis
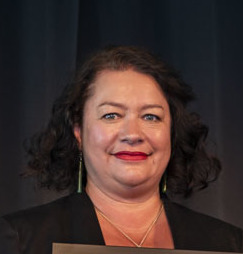
- Ngarino Ellis
- Occupation: Professor Art History
- Relatives: Robert Ellis; Elizabeth Ellis

Academic background
- Education: University of Auckland
- Thesis: A Whakapapa of Tradition: Iwirakau Carving 1830 to 1930
- Doctoral advisor: Roger Neich, Leonard Bell, Elizabeth Rankin, Ngahuia Te Awekotuku

Academic work
- Discipline: Art history
- Sub-discipline: specialist toi Māori (Māori arts)
- Institutions: University of Auckland

Ngarino Ellis is a New Zealand academic and author. She is one of only a few in her field of Māori art history and an educator. She is a professor at the University of Auckland. Her first book published in 2016 is titled A Whakapapa of Tradition: One Hundred Years of Ngāti Porou Carving 1830–1930 with photography by Natalie Robertson. It won the Judith Binney Best First Book at the Ockham Book Awards in 2016. Her latest book, Toi Te Mana. An Indigenous History of Maori Art, written with Deidre Brown and Jonathan Mane-Wheoki, won the Illustrated Non-Fiction Award for the Ockhams, New Zealand's national book awards in 2025.

== Background and academic career ==
Ellis is Māori and affiliates with the iwi Ngapuhi from the Bay of Islands, Northland and Ngāti Porou from the East Cape. She is the daughter of artists Robert Ellis and Elizabeth Ellis, and twin sister of district court judge Hana Ellis.

Ellis has two undergraduate degrees from the University of Auckland, Law and Art History starting in 1988 and graduating in 1993 and being admitted to the Bar later that year. She practiced law in central Auckland for a short time, and began a masters, completing a Master of Arts in Art History, from the University of Auckland in 1996. Her thesis entitled Hoe Whakairo, 1769–1850 focused on Māori carved and painted paddles. She wrote her PhD in Art History from 1997 to 2012, with the thesis A Whakapapa of Tradition: Iwirakau Carving 1830 to 1930, which was published as a book in 2016. The book was selected in Books of Mana as one of the 180 most significant works of Māori-authored non-fiction.

Ellis started teaching a new postgraduate Museums and Cultural Heritage course at the University of Auckland in 2013.

She has won several awards for teaching including an award at the 2019 New Zealand’s Tertiary Teaching Excellence Awards where Ako Aotearoa recognised her as a role model in her teaching for her Kaupapa Māori (Māori cultural) approaches and influencing both staff and students alike. Ellis is a trail blazer as in 2019 she was the only Māori art historian teaching in a New Zealand university.

Her book with Deidre Brown and Jonathan Mane-Wheoki,Toi te Mana: An Indigenous History of Maori Art, (2024) creates a framework that draws upon the journey of Māori god Tāne to gain 'the three baskets of knowledge.'

She has received three Marsden Grants from the Royal Society Te Apārangi.

In teaching students about Māori art [Ellis] empowers them with an understanding of the Māori world, so that students leave her classes feeling braver, more confident and more passionate about learning.

— Ako Aotearoa

== Selected works ==
=== Published works and research ===
- A Whakapapa of Tradition: One Hundred Years of Ngāti Porou Carving 1830–1930 (2016), with photography by Natalie Robertson
- Nga Taonga o Wharawhara: The World of Maori Body Adornment (2020–2023)
- Te Puna: Maori Art from Te Tai Tokerau, Northland
- Toi Te Mana: An Indigenous History of Maori Art, (2024) co-authored with Deidre Brown and Jonathan Mane-Wheoki

=== Curated exhibitions ===
- Whakawhanaungatanga: Connecting taonga across people, places and time (2022–2024), exhibition, co-curator with Dougal Austin, Awhina Tamarapa and Justine Treadwell, Linden Museum, Stuttgart.
- Talking About (Rangi Kipa) (2004), exhibition, Objectspace, Auckland
- Pūrangiaho: Seeing Clearly (2001), exhibition, co-curator with Kahutoi Te Kanawa and Ngahiraka Mason, Auckland Art Gallery Toi o Tāmaki
- Patai. Pa Tai. Questions, Tides, Collisions (Gordon Walters) (1999), exhibition, co-curator with Damian Skinner, Adam Art Gallery, Victoria University of Wellington, Wellington

=== Conference presentations (select) ===
- 2013 Kia ora te whānau! Going global with Māori Art History – Native American Art Studies Association Conference, Denver.
- 2016 Plenary: Why I don’t come to conferences like these – Art Association of Australia and New Zealand, Canberra
- 2016 What is Māori Art History? – Art Association of Australia and New Zealand, Canberra
- 2017 Roundtable: What’s a Māori to do? Teaching and Innovating Māori History in the Turbulent Present with Aroha Harris and Hirini Kaa – New Zealand Historical Association Conference, Christchurch
- 2018 He maunga teitei: Teaching Māori Art as a Baseline for Art History in Aotearoa Today – New Zealand Art History Teachers Association, Auckland
- 2019 Teaching Museums Studies in Aotearoa New Zealand – Museums Aotearoa Conference, Wellington
- 2019 Indigenising provenance research – Pacific Arts Association International Conference [Basel, Switzerland]
- 2022 Me he manu rere: The use of birds in and as adornment by Maori in the 19th century – Art Association of Australia and New Zealand [Melbourne]
- 2023 He whakapapa o ngā rākai parāoa: A biography of whalebone adornments – Art Association of Australia and New Zealand [Gold Coast]
- 2024 Making space for Indigenous voices, histories and futures – roundtable with Erin Vink and Lisa Hilli – Art Association of Australia and New Zealand [Canberra]
- 2024 Ko 'Toi Te Mana' e ngunguru nei: Maori art as history, Chicago University Press.

== Awards ==
- 2017 Ngā Kupu Ora Awards: Celebrating Māori Books and Journalism – Art Category (2017)
- Sustained Excellence in Teaching Award (2018), University of Auckland
- Faculty of Arts Early Career Research Award (2018), University of Auckland
- National Tertiary Teaching Award – Kaupapa Māori category Ako Aotearoa (2019)
- Early Career Research Excellence Award for Humanities (2020), Royal Society Te Apārangi
- Faculty of Arts He Tōtara Whakamarumaru: Mātauranga Māori Excellence Award (2021). Team award for Ngarino Ellis, Renee Hau, Kate Harris, Tāniora Maxwell and Eliza Macdonald for work on Ngā Taonga o Wharawhara
- Illustrated non-fiction award, Ockham New Zealand Book Awards, with Deidre Brown and Jonathan Mane-Wheoki, for Toi Te Mana: An Indigenous History of Māori Art (2025)
