= Waharoa =

A waharoa is an entrance gateway to a marae complex in New Zealand. Waharoa may refer to:

- Waharoa (Aotea Square sculpture) (1990), a sculpture by Selwyn Muru in Aotea Square, Auckland
- Waharoa (1990), a sculptural entranceway to the Auckland High Court created by Jacob Scott
- Waharoa, New Zealand, in the Waikato Region
- Waharoa (whale), an extinct genus of whale
- Te Waharoa, 19th century leader of Ngāti Hauā
