= Teuane Tibbo =

New Zealand artist (1895–1984)

Teuane Ann Tibbo
- Born: 2 October 1895; Pago Pago
- Died: 24 May 1984 (aged 88)
- Occupation: Artist

Teuane Ann Tibbo (2 October 1895 – 24 May 1984) was a Samoan-born New Zealand artist. She started painting when she was 71 years old; her work is held in the permanent collections of Auckland Art Gallery Toi o Tāmaki, Museum of New Zealand Te Papa Tongarewa, The Hocken Collections (University of Otago), The University of Auckland and the National Gallery of Australia.

Tibbo was born in Pago Pago, grew up in Samoa, and later lived in Fiji as an adult before moving to Auckland, New Zealand in 1945 with her husband and eight children. She began painting in the 1960s, without any formal training, when one of her daughters became interested in art. Pat Hanly introduced Tibbo to Barry Lett, who became her dealer and showed her work at Barry Lett Galleries; her first solo exhibition was at Lett's gallery in 1964. Her work often depicted leisure activities from her Samoan childhood, such as fishing, cricket, swimming, church and picnics.

In 2002, a retrospective of her work, "Keep It in the Heart: The Paintings of Teuane Tibbo" was held in Auckland at the Lopdell House Gallery (now Te Uru). Her work was also featured in the 2021 exhibition Stars Start Falling, which was presented at the Govett-Brewster Art Gallery and Te Uru.

In 2009, Tibbo's daughter Audie Pennefather published a biography of Tibbo's life titled A True & Strange Story: The Life of Teuane Ann Tibbo, Artist 1895-1984. When Te Papa reopened in 2025, after being closed for a year, Tibbo's work was included in the featured artists as part of the reopening.
