= Roy Good =

New Zealand artist

- Born: 1945 (age 80–81); Timaru, New Zealand
- Known for: Design and painting
- Style: Modern Abstraction

Roy Good (born 1945) is a New Zealand artist and designer known for his modern abstraction.

== Early life ==
At age 12, Good's cartoons appeared in The Press, a newspaper in Christchurch. He attended art classes at the Canterbury College School of Arts. After taking a gap year post-high school, Good returned to the college to pursue an arts degree with a focus on painting. In 1966, Good relocated to Auckland to enrol in teacher's college, but he left before completing the year-long program (a placement in a high school made him realise that teaching younger students was not his calling). After spending time as a labourer for the railways, he was pleased to get back into art when he secured a position as a scenic artist at New Zealand Broadcasting Corporation.

== Design and art career ==
Good completed his studies at Ilam School of Fine Arts in Christchurch in 1965, after which he relocated to West Auckland and began a long-term collaboration with Television New Zealand (formerly NZBC), serving as Head of Design from 1983 to 1989. He showcased his artwork at the Barry Lett Galleries during the early 1970s and later exhibited at the Petar/James Gallery alongside other abstract artists including Milan Mrkusich, Ian Scott, Geoff Thornley, and Gordon Walters. From the late 1980s, Good was frequently commissioned to undertake high-profile corporate design projects, including the branding for New Zealand's Expo pavilions in 1988 and 1992, and for the sesquicentennial celebrations in 1990.

Good dedicated himself to his own art on a full-time basis since 2008. Now in his late 70s, he was described as one of the initial innovators of modernist abstraction in New Zealand by Ocula Magazine.

From 13 December 2007 to 10 February 2008, Lopdell House Gallery in Auckland featured a retrospective of his artworks curated by Ed Hanfling, titled In Good Form – The Abstract Art of Roy Good, 1967-2007, which was supported by a book of the same name.

To mark Good's 50 years of art career, Te Uru Waitākere Contemporary Gallery had a major retrospective of Good's work titled Parallel Universe: The Art and Design of Roy Good that ran from 1 December 2018 to 10 February 2019. The exhibition was curated by Ed Hanfling. The exhibition was accompanied with a publication authored by Hanfling with contributions by Andrew Paul Wood and Andrew Clifford.

Good is also a collector and he has works by Logan Brewer, Guy Ngan, Don Peebles, Theo Schoon, Marté Szirmay, Geoff Thornley, Geoff Tune, Gordon Walters and Meryvn Williams in his collection.

== Collections ==
Good's work is held in numerous private and major public collections throughout New Zealand, including Museum of New Zealand Te Papa Tongarewa, Christchurch Art Gallery, University of Auckland, and Fletcher Trust.

=== Selected solo exhibitions ===
- 2025: Recent Paintings by Roy Good, The Grey Place, Auckland, New Zealand
- 2022: Squares Cascade, Scott Lawrie Gallery, Auckland, New Zealand
- 2020: Gothic Revival, NorthArt, Auckland, New Zealand
- 2018: Parallel Universe: The Art and Design of Roy Good, Te Uru Waitākere Contemporary Gallery, Auckland, New Zealand
- 2016: Bisecting Planes, Artis Gallery, Auckland, New Zealand
- 2007: In Good Form – The Abstract Art of Roy Good, 1967-2007, Lopdell House Gallery, Auckland, New Zealand

=== Selected group exhibitions ===
- 2024: Horizon 2, Bergman Gallery, Auckland, New Zealand
- 2023: Five Painters, Bergman Gallery, Auckland, New Zealand
- 2022: Roy Good | Linda Va'aelua | Louise Blyton, Scott Lawrie Gallery, Auckland, New Zealand
