= New Zealand Journal of History =

Academic journal covering the history of New Zealand

- Discipline: History of New Zealand
- Language: English

Publication details
- History: 1967–present
- Frequency: Quarterly

Standard abbreviations
- ISO 4: N. Z. J. Hist.

Indexing
- ISSN: 0028-8322

The New Zealand Journal of History is an academic journal covering the history of New Zealand. It has been published by the University of Auckland since 1967.

A microfilm version was published between 1967 and 2021.

A compilation of articles that appeared between 1967 and 2000 was published in 2001. The compilation included items about Māori history:

Judith Binney, Māori oral narratives, Pākehā written texts: two forms of telling history
Tipene O'Regan, Old myths and new politics: some contemporary uses of traditional history
J. G. A. Pocock, Tangata whenua and enlightenment anthropology
Claudia Orange, An exercise in Māori autonomy: the rise and demise of the Māori War Effort Organization
Angela Ballara, Wāhine rangatira: Māori women of rank and their role in the women's kotahitanga movement of the 1890s
R. M. Ross, Te Tiriti o Waitangi: texts and translations
Alan Ward, History and historians before the Waitangi Tribunal: some reflections on the Ngāi Tahu claim
Vincent O'Malley, Treaty making in early colonial New Zealand
