= Mere Lodge =

Māori artist and advocate for te reo Māori

- Born: 1944 (age 81–82); Ruatoria, New Zealand
- Education: Elam School of Fine Arts
- Notable work: Hine Puhitapu; Korikori; Te Toka a Tōrea; Mata Whenua
- Spouse: Victor Lodge

Mere Waihuka Lodge (née Harrison; born 1944) is a New Zealand Māori artist working in largely in sculpture, a teacher and an advocate for te reo Māori and language revitalisation efforts.

== Biography ==
Lodge was born Mere Harrison in Ruatoria in 1944, the tenth of 13 children of Raniera Harrison and Erana Nika Horimete, and affiliates to Ngāti Porou. After gaining her School Certificate at Ngata Memorial College, she spent a year at Northland College, on the arrangement by her older sister, Kāterina Mataira, to obtain further qualifications so that she could study at Elam School of Fine Arts. In the 1960s, she was, alongside her cousin Elizabeth Ellis, one of the first Māori women to attend Elam, graduating with a Diploma in Fine Arts in 1964. During her time at Elam, she would return to Ruatoria for the holidays, where she met her future husband, Victor Lodge. Following her graduation, she taught in New Zealand and Fiji.

At Elam, particularly with the guidance of Jim Allen, Lodge developed a passion for sculpture. She has several works in bronze, including two in the permanent collection of Auckland Art Gallery Toi o Tāmaki (Hine Puhitapu and Korikori), and two in the permanent collection of Christchurch Art Gallery Te Puna o Waiwhetū (Te Toka a Tōrea and Mata Whenua). The Aotearoa New Zealand Association of Art Educators described Lodge's art:

"Her work often features textured paint and geometric sculptural forms inspired by the whenua (land) of her tīpuna (ancestors) and papakāinga (homeland). While her works do not contain specific Māori motifs or visual links, they capture the wairua (spirit) of her home."

In 1975, Lodge was featured in the film Ashes. In the 1990s, she assisted Roger Blackley in an exhibition of works by C. F. Goldie at Auckland Art Gallery Toi o Tāmaki by tracing descendants of the portrait subjects. From 1994 to 2021, she was a member of the Haerewa Māori Advisory Board at Auckland Art Gallery Toi o Tāmaki. In 2021, following the departure of the curator Māori, Nigel Borell, Lodge and four other members of the Haerewa Māori Advisory Board resigned their positions. Collectively, they stated in a letter to the gallery's director that: "We have valued our time guiding and supporting the curator Māori and wider gallery, ensuring it is a culturally safe place for all. However, changes over the past two years at Auckland Art Gallery Toi o Tāmaki have set a different vision for Māori."

As well as her art, Lodge has advocated for te reo Māori and language revitalisation efforts. In the 1980s, she worked with Tuakana Mate (Tuki) Nepe, Rawinia Penfold and Elizabeth Rata at Auckland College of Education to develop a curriculum in te reo Māori, and taught in some of first Māori total-immersion schools.

== Exhibitions ==
Lodge's art works have been exhibited around New Zealand, including:

- Maori Art and Craft Exhibition, Forum North, Whangārei (1983)
- Toi Tū Toi Ora: Contemporary Māori Art, Auckland Art Gallery Toi o Tāmaki (2021), with the artworks Mata Whenua and Te Toka-a-Tōrea
- Mind that Māori, Tim Melville Gallery (2024)
- Modern Women: Flight of Time, Auckland Art Gallery Toi o Tāmaki (2024)
