= Jonathan Mane-Wheoki =

New Zealand art historian, academic and curator (1943–2014)

Jonathan Mane-Wheoki CNZM
- Born: 18 December 1943; North Island, New Zealand
- Died: 10 October 2014 (aged 70); Auckland, New Zealand
- Education: University of Canterbury; Courtauld Institute of Art
- Known for: Contemporary Māori and Pacific art history
- Scientific career
- Fields: Art history
- Workplaces: University of Canterbury; Museum of New Zealand Te Papa Tongarewa; University of Auckland

Jonathan Ngarimu Mane-Wheoki CNZM (8 December 1943 – 10 October 2014) was a New Zealand art historian, academic, and curator. He was a pioneer in the study of contemporary Māori and Pacific art history.

== Biography ==
Of Ngāpuhi, Te Aupōuri, Ngāti Kurī and English descent, Mane-Wheoki was born on 18 December 1943, and grew up in the Hokianga. When his family moved to Titirangi in the 1950s, he came into contact with the prominent New Zealand artist, Colin McCahon, who would become his first art teacher at night classes taught at the Auckland Art Gallery by McCahon in the 1950s.

Between 1966 and 1971 Mane-Wheoki studied at the University of Canterbury, where Rudolf Gopas was an important influence on him. He completed his Diploma in Fine Arts (Hons) in 1969, followed by a BA in English. His 1969 Honours thesis was titled The musical phase of modern painting. He worked for the Robert McDougall Art Gallery before travelling to the Courtauld Institute of Art in London, where he gained an M.A. in Art History focusing on Ecclesiology, Colonial Ecclesiology, and Religious Art in France. His M.A. report was titled Polychromatic Elements in High Victorian Church Architecture. While in London, he began studying for a PhD under an Arts Council NZ scholarship.

He returned to New Zealand to begin his academic career at the University of Canterbury in 1975, rising to become dean of music and fine arts. In 2004 he became director of art and collection services at the Museum of New Zealand Te Papa Tongarewa, and in 2009 he was appointed professor of fine arts and head of the Elam School of Fine Arts at the University of Auckland. He stepped down as the head of Elam in 2012, was an honorary research fellow at Te Papa from 2012, and in 2013 he took on the part-time role of head of arts and visual culture at that institution. After the 2011 Christchurch earthquake, he supported the retention of Christchurch Cathedral, arguing that the church was part of the city's identity and its "heart".

Mane-Wheoki, who was an openly gay Anglican churchman, was seen as a positive role model in the LGBT community in New Zealand. Geremy Hema stated, "for gay Maori and gay Anglicans his mere presence provides much inspiration. He was respected, adored and revered by all in the Maori, academic, ecclesiastical, and creative circles in which he and his partner Paul existed."

== Honours and awards ==
In 2008, Mane-Wheoki was awarded an honorary LittD by the University of Canterbury. He received the Pou Aronui Award from the Royal Society of New Zealand in 2012, for outstanding contribution in the development of the humanities in Aotearoa New Zealand. In the 2014 Queen's Birthday Honours he was appointed a Companion of the New Zealand Order of Merit, for services to the arts.

The 2025 Ockham New Zealand Book Award for Illustrated non-fiction was won by Toi Te Mana: An Indigenous History of Māori Art, on which Mane-Wheoki had worked with co-authors Deidre Brown and Ngarino Ellis before his death.

== Death ==
He died in Auckland on 10 October 2014 after a long struggle with pancreatic cancer, having recently visited the Hokianga to see where he would be buried, and said he was prepared to die. "I am relaxed about it, what else can I be?" He died a month after his investiture ceremony at Government House as a Companion of the New Zealand Order of Merit.
