= Toi iho =

Authentic Māori Arts IP organisation

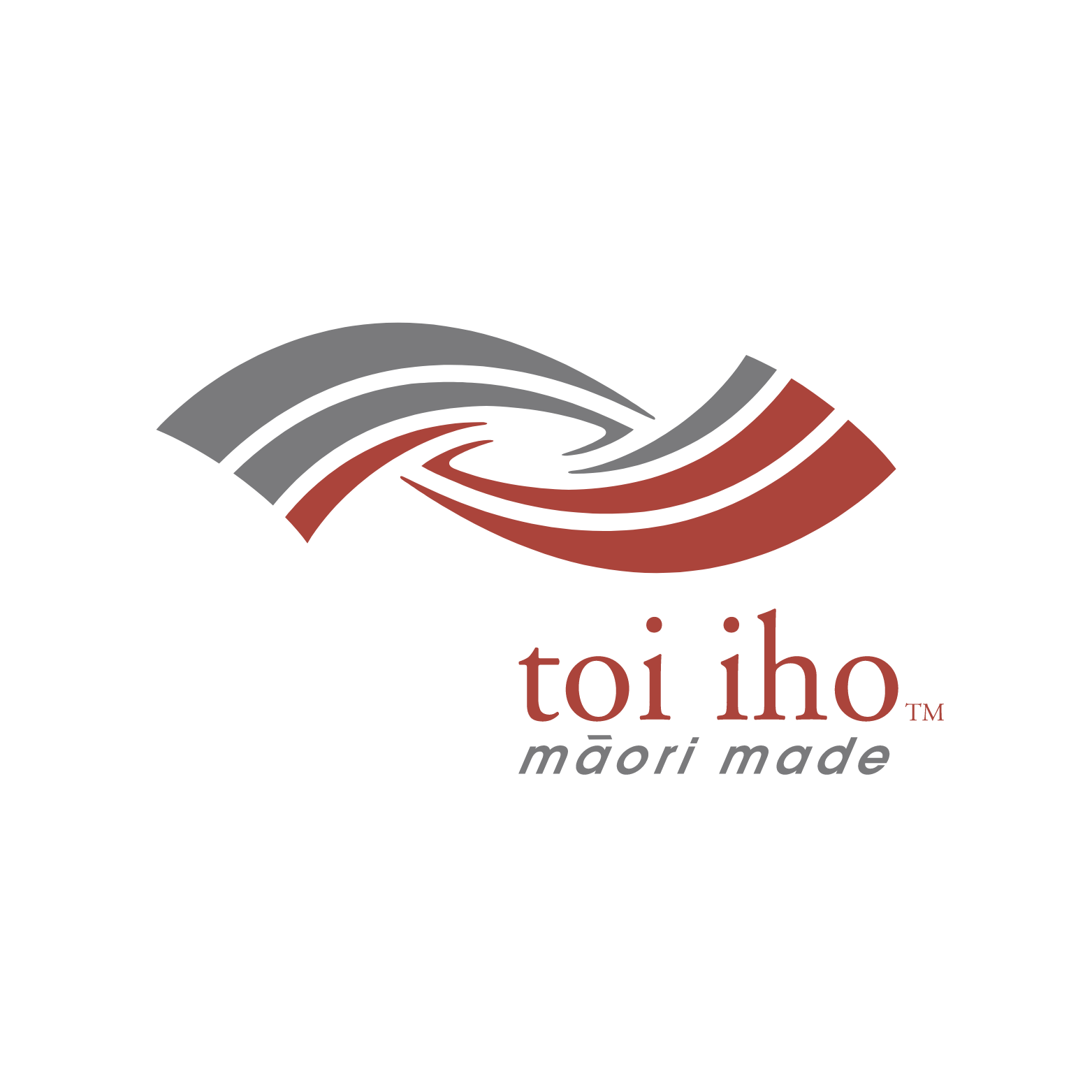
Toi Iho Māori Made logo

Toi iho is a trademark that certifies the authenticity and quality of Māori art. The mark identifies work made by artists of Māori descent and assessed against a set standard.

== Origins and establishment ==
The idea of a mark of quality and authenticity for Māori art was first raised by Sir Āpirana Ngata in 1936 and proposed again by the New Zealand Māori Council in 1964. Te Waka Toi, the Māori arts board of Creative New Zealand, began developing the concept in 1997, with the design led by master carver Dr Pakaariki (Paki) Harrison alongside a group of senior Māori artists. A key part in the development of the mark was the incorporation of standards and evaluation of artist's work to ensure they are of high quality.

The trademark was launched on 8 February 2002 at the Auckland Art Gallery Toi o Tāmaki. A song composed by Hirini Melbourne was performed at the launch, with performances by Moana Maniapoto and the kapa haka group Te Waka Huia. The initiative was developed by Creative New Zealand through Te Waka Toi as part of its Cultural Recovery Package work.

Originally toi iho developed four marks: toi iho Māori Made, toi iho Mainly Māori, toi iho Māori Co-production, and a Licensed Stockist mark. The companion marks recognised cross-cultural work between Māori and non-Māori artists and businesses. After the withdrawal of funding the mark was reduced to just one: toi iho Māori Made.

In 2009 Creative New Zealand decided to stop funding the management and promotion of toi iho, stating that many Māori artists were building successful careers without the mark and that reviews had found it had not met its aims. Reported administration costs were about $300,000 to $320,000 a year, the mark had been set up with just over $1 million of public funding, and uptake was low, with 15 of 200 artists using it at one Māori art market. The decision was criticised by some of those who had helped establish it.

== Community ownership and revival ==
After protests by Māori artists and arts advocates, the government agreed to return the mark to Māori. In October 2010 Toi Iho Kaitiaki Incorporated (TIKI) became the legal entity responsible for the mark. In 2013 the Toi Iho Charitable Trust was established to hold and administer the mark.

In 2022 toi iho was registered as a charitable entity, and in 2023 received a grant from Manatū Taonga, the Ministry for Culture and Heritage, to revitalise the brand. In 2024, toi iho formed an IP Rōpū. Following a hui at Rotorua in August 2024 with the IP Rōpū and Toi Iho artists Toi iho developed a tikanga process for Cultural & Intellectual Property Rights : Te Mana Whakamahi Mō Ngā Toi Māori.

The trust is chaired by Elizabeth Ellis CNZM, JP.

== Awards and recognition ==
In 2025 toi iho received an Honourable Mention in the Jeonju International Award for Promoting Intangible Cultural Heritage (JIAPICH) managed by the ICH NGO Forum which is accredited to UNESCO under the 2003 Convention for the Safeguarding of the Intangible Cultural Heritage.
