= Elizabeth Ellis (artist) =

New Zealand artist and advocate for Māori art

Elizabeth Ellis CNZM JP
- Born: Elizabeth Aroha Mountain; 1945 (age 80–81); Kawakawa, New Zealand
- Education: Elam School of Fine Arts, The University of Auckland
- Known for: Painter
- Movement: Modernism
- Spouse: Robert Ellis (m. 1966)
- Children: 2
- Relatives: Hana Ellis (daughter)|Ngarino Ellis (daughter)

Elizabeth Aroha Ellis CNZM JP (née Mountain; born 1945) is a New Zealand painter and Māori arts advocate.

== Education and career ==
Born in Kawakawa, Northland, New Zealand in 1945, Ellis's parents Emere Makere Waiwaha Kaa RN RM CM QSO and Walter Mountain, were Kuia Kaumātua (elders) of Te Rawhiti Marae. She is Māori and is affiliated with iwi (tribes) Ngāpuhi and Ngāti Porou.

Ellis trained at the Elam School of Fine Arts, graduating with a Diploma of Fine Art in 1964, becoming one of the first Māori women to do so, alongside her cousin, Mere Harrison Lodge. Ellis does not often exhibit her own work, which explores the landscapes of her home and people, especially wāhine Māori (Māori women). Most recently Ellis exhibited her work in Brazil and Norway in 2022–2023, and as part of the exhibition Modern Women at Auckland Art Gallery in 2025.

She is a dedicated teacher, promoter, developer and supporter of Māori art, and is especially committed to mentoring and supporting Māori women artists.

Ellis has had a long career in art governance and has been an active leader in the art and culture sector of New Zealand, including more than 25 years with Haerewa, the Māori advisory group to the Auckland Art Gallery. Ellis also served for three years on the Creative New Zealand Council, nine years on the Māori Arts Board, Te Waka Toi, and was a trustee for seven years on the New Zealand Arts Foundation. Ellis has also represented New Zealand on international arts councils and festivals.

Ellis was an education evaluator in the Education Review Office from 1989 to 2009 when she retired as Area Manager for Auckland and Te Tai Tokerau. She was appointed Commissioner of Te Aute College, Hawke's Bay in 2011 and remained in that role until 2013.

Since 2012, Ellis is chair of the Wairau Māori Art Gallery Charitable Trust, which opened New Zealand's first dedicated contemporary public Māori art gallery in the Hundertwasser Art Centre in Whangārei in February 2022. She is also the chair of the Toi Iho Charitable Trust since 2010. In 2025 she was named Senior New Zealander of the Year. Her new passion project is MAMA: Maori Art Museum of Aotearoa.

== Personal life ==
Ellis married British-born painter Robert Ellis in 1966 and they had twin daughters, Judge Hana Ellis and art historian Professor Ngarino Ellis. Ellis' home in North Shore, Auckland, was designed by architect Gordon Smith in 1970, where she has lived for over 50 years.

== Honours and awards ==
In the 2003 Queen's Birthday Honours, Ellis was appointed a Companion of the New Zealand Order of Merit, for services to Māori arts and crafts. On 19 March 2025, she was named the 2025 Senior New Zealander of the Year at the New Zealander of the Year Awards.
