= Aotea Square =

Public square in Auckland, New Zealand

Coordinates: 36°51′08″S 174°45′47″E

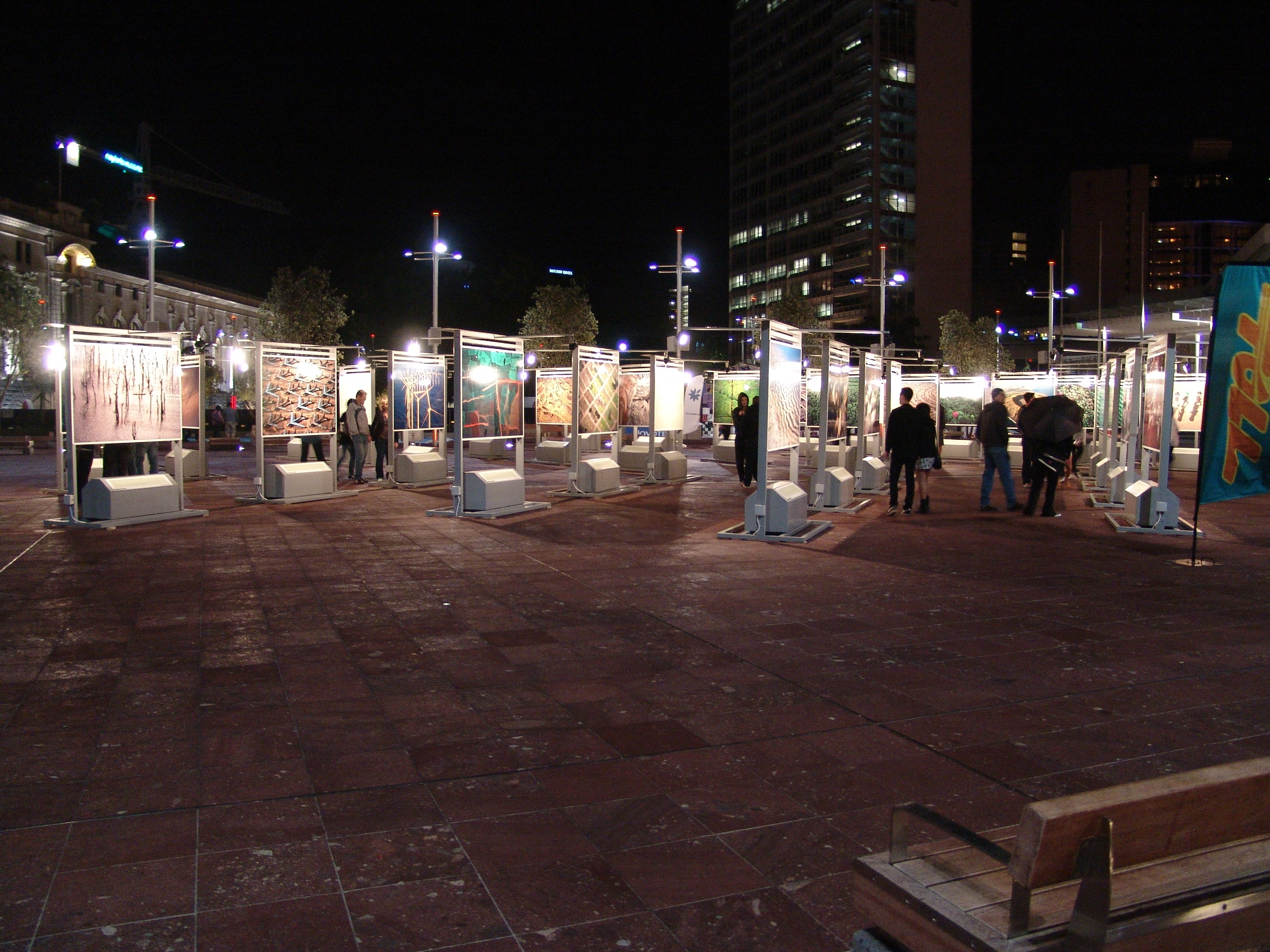
Aotea Square hosting an art installation, 2010

Aotea Square (Māori: Aotea - Te Papa Tū Wātea) is a large paved public area in the CBD of Auckland, New Zealand. Officially opened in 1979 by Sir Dove-Myer Robinson next to Queen Street, it is used for open-air concerts and gatherings, markets, and political rallies. In November 2010, a major redevelopment of Aotea Square was completed. The square was redesigned to make it appropriate for use by crowds of up to 20,000 people.

Its name is derived from Motu Aotea, the Māori name for Great Barrier Island, which is the largest offshore island of New Zealand, approximately 90 km (56 mi) from downtown Auckland. It is near Te Waihorotiu railway station, which is located on Wellesley Street.

== History ==
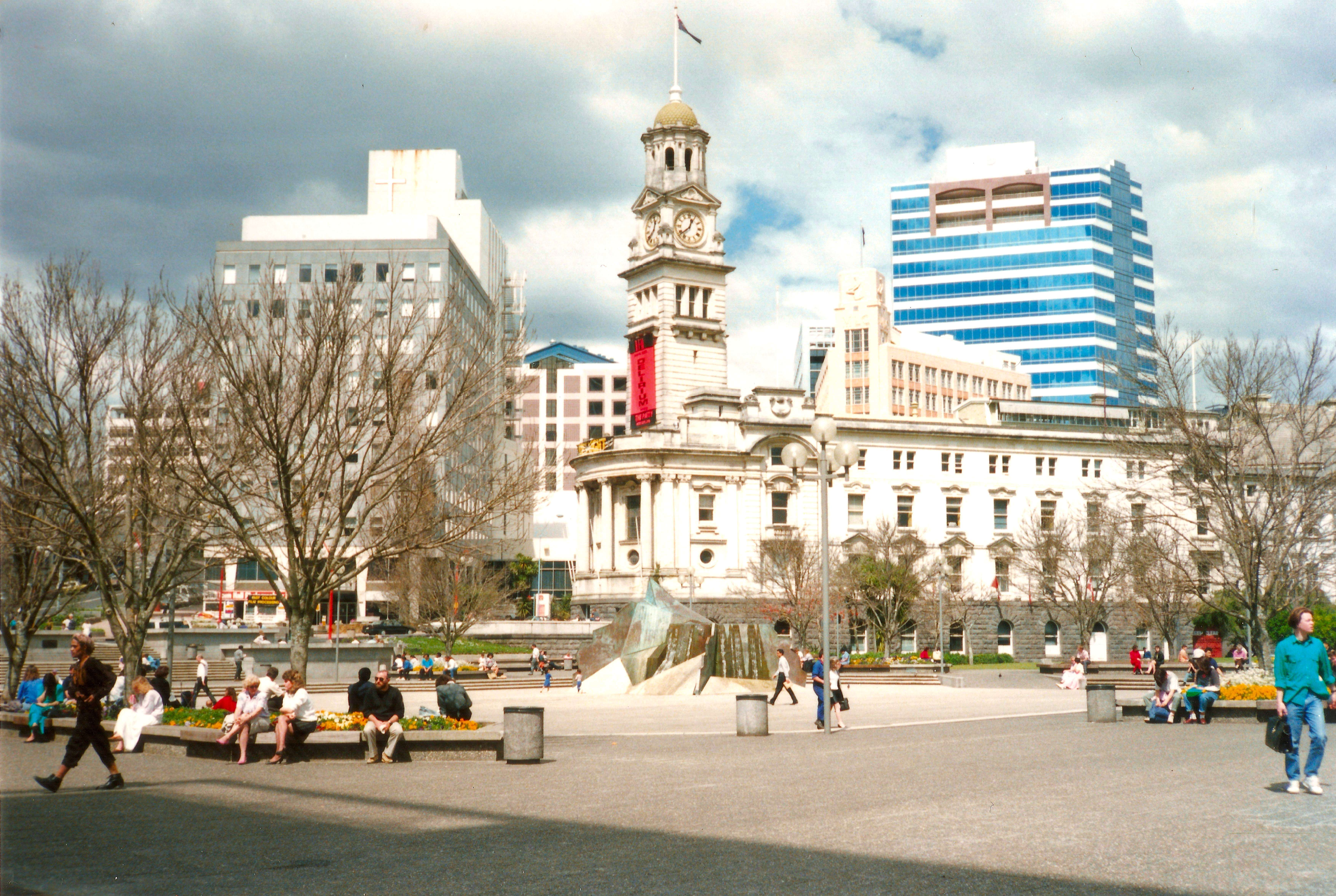
Square and Town Hall in 1990

=== Construction ===
The square was created in 1979, with a large part of it being the former end of Grey's Avenue, which used to connect directly to Queen Street – a large underground carpark with 930 spaces had been erected underneath in 1975.

In 2000 a competition for a redesign was held, but in 2004, before the winning design by Ted Smyth and Associates (including Rod Barnett and Dr Dushko Bogunovich) could be built, damage to the car park roof was discovered, which stopped the project. While the roof was temporarily stabilised and plans for its repair made, a consultation process initiated by mayor Dick Hubbard called 'Outside the Square' resulted in a new proposal. This proposal was abandoned after it was estimated to cost up to $600 million. After this the old design was revised several times (including some feedback from public consultation in August 2008) and was adopted in 2008.

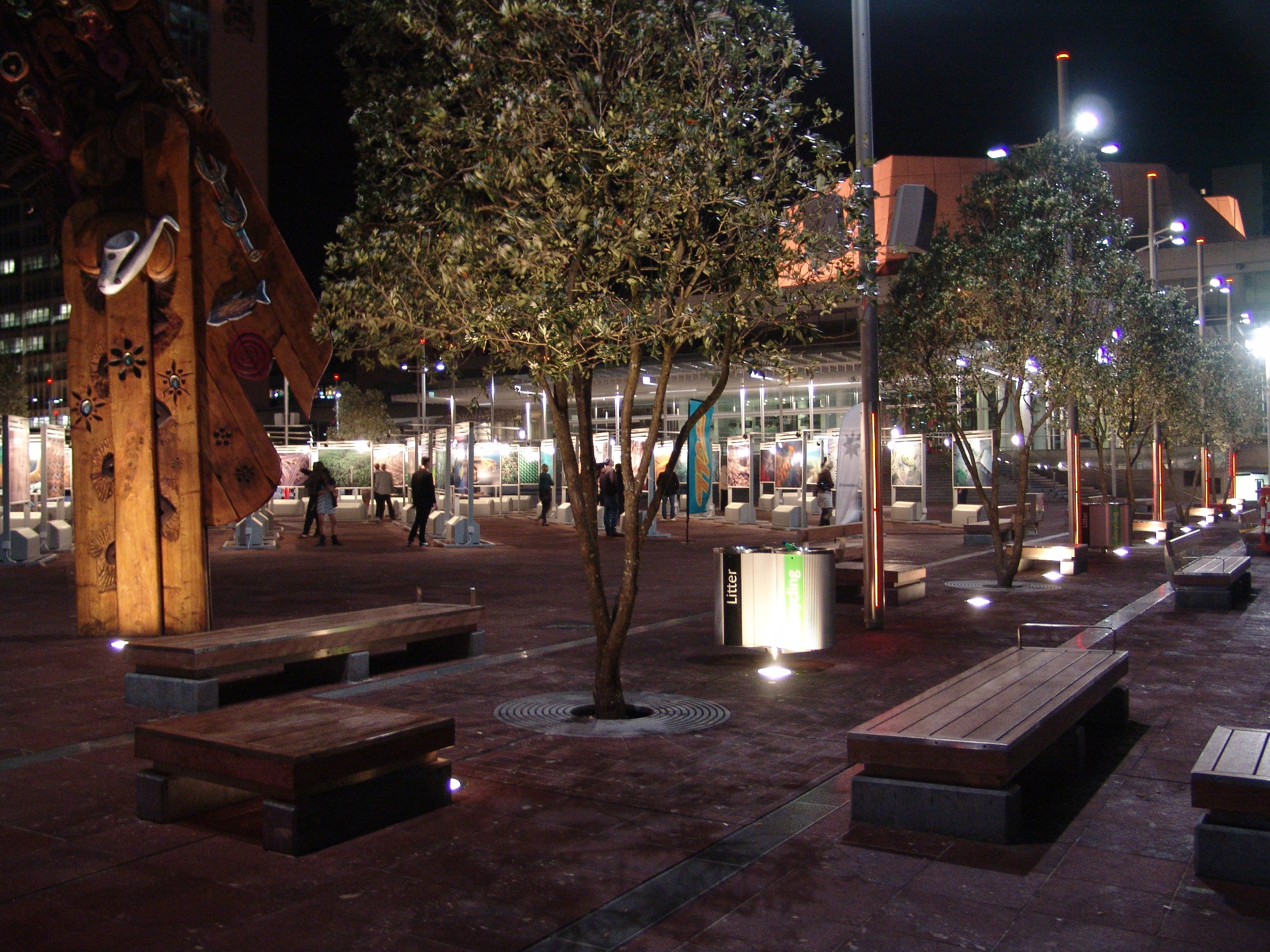
Aotea Square at night after the refurbishment in 2010

Construction started in November 2008 and ran to late 2010, during which there were no events in the square. The project was projected to cost NZ$80 million, around $45 million for the car park repair, $25 million for the upgrade, and $10 million for works on the Aotea Centre facade. A cost saving of $15 million was identified during the process due to a modified construction process for the car park roof, which allowed the project to dispense with building a temporary car park.

=== Significant events ===
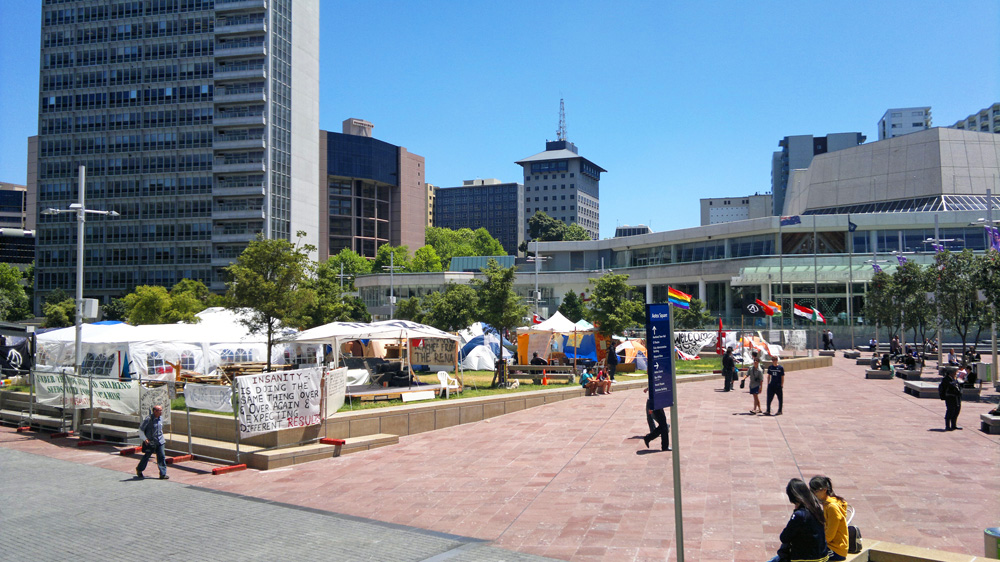
Aotea Square in 2011 during the Occupy movement

Aotea Square is often utilised for public events, including fairs, protest rallies, music festivals and rock concerts.

Aotea Square was site of a major civil disturbance on 7 December 1984, during a free end-of-academic year rock concert given by bands including Herbs and DD Smash. A power cut interrupted the concert for a time, and some of the concert-goers began throwing bottles at police in attendance, who called up additional forces in riot gear but at first did not intervene further.

Dave Dobbyn, DD Smash's lead singer, was later accused of having incited a riot by declaring "I wish those riot squad guys would stop wanking and put their little batons away". This caused a riot amongst parts of the audience, who moved into Queen Street, smashing shop windows and overturning cars, causing over NZ$ 1 million in reported damage.

Others present noted that the rioting was influenced by a number of factors, including the large number of intoxicated audience members, youth relief about the end of the Muldoon era, and a confrontational attitude by the police, who allegedly blocked the exits from the concert area, giving the crowd no obvious way to disperse.

The riot was the subject of a Commission of Inquiry headed by Peter Mahon.

Beginning on 15 October 2011, the square was the site of an Occupy Movement protest. Protesters pitched tents and erected ad hoc shelters and camped on the grassy areas, intending to occupy the site for six weeks until 30 November. In fact, the occupation lasted into January 2012, when Auckland Council served trespass notices and security guards and police jointly removed or arrested the occupiers on 23 January 2012. The occupation was over by the end of January, with a total of 30 arrests.

== Surroundings ==
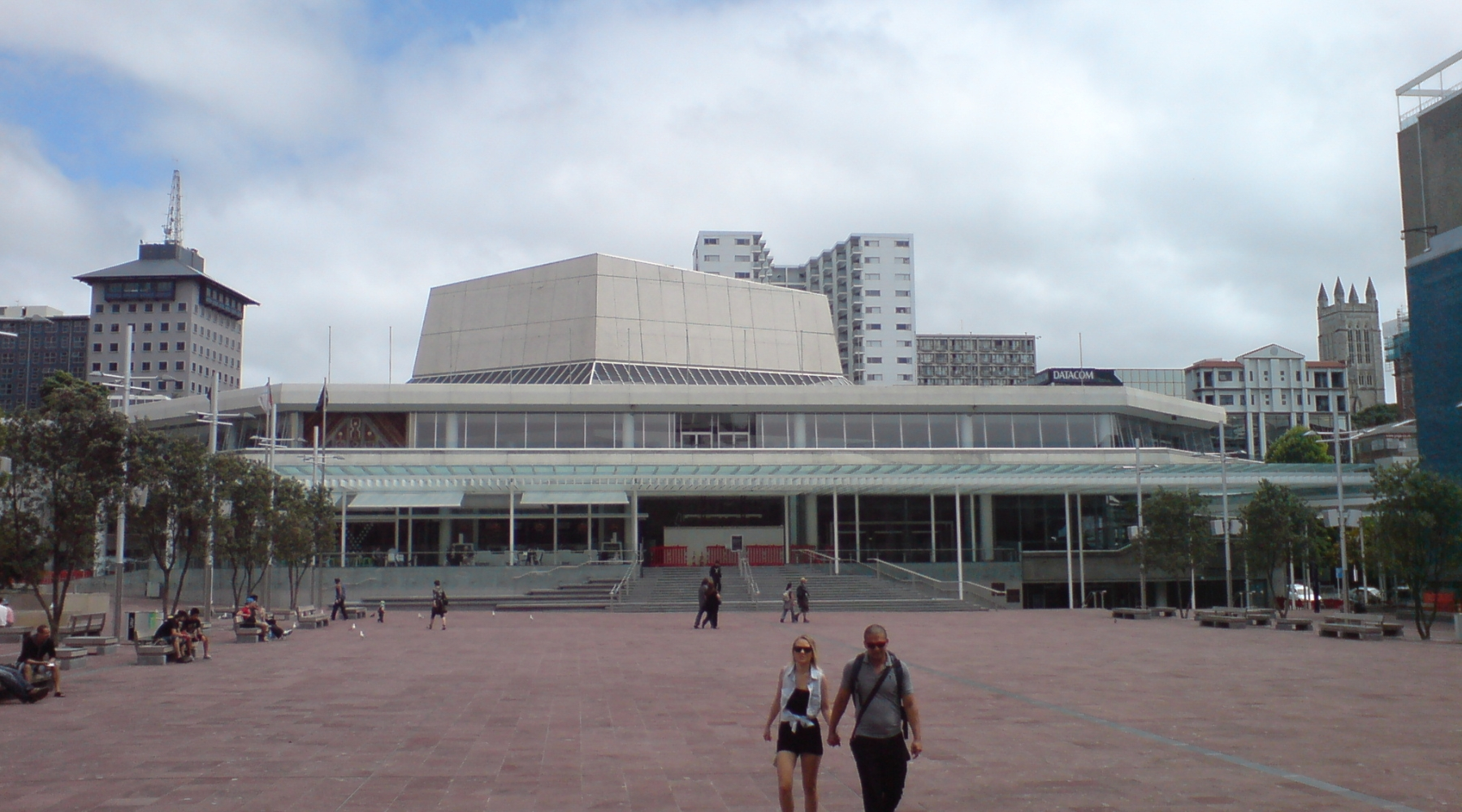
In the square facing west toward the Aotea Centre

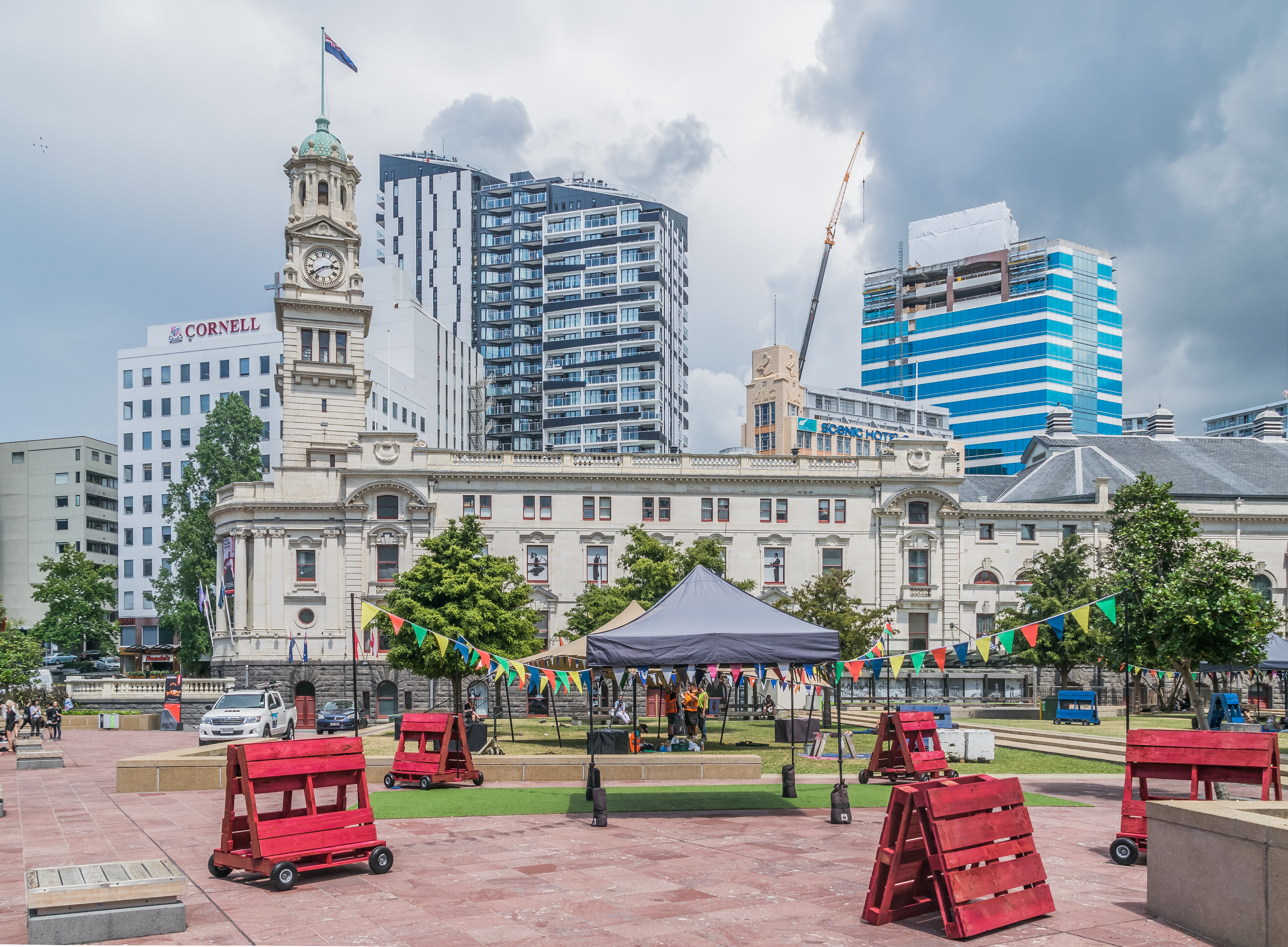
Facing southeast toward Auckland Town Hall (2017)

The Edwardian Auckland Town Hall is at the Queen Street entrance to the square. It has a main concert chamber with excellent acoustics, and was extensively restored and upgraded in 1994.

To the south of the square are the Administration block of the Auckland City Council and the entry to Myers Park.

On the western side of the square is Auckland's main conference and theatre venue, the Aotea Centre. The foyer contains art works by many New Zealand artists including a full-length portrait in bronze of Dame Kiri Te Kanawa by Terry Stringer.

To the north of the square is a cinema/theatre complex which includes the Event Cinema venue in the IMAX centre, and the 1929 Civic Theatre, which was built in the atmospheric theatre style; its main chamber is illuminated with lights placed to correspond with the constellations of the southern night sky.

Aotea Square was originally the location of a swamp, filled and drained by the Waihorotiu Stream. The stream was turned into an open sewer canal and eventually bricked over and the swampy area drained. A three-storey underground parking garage accessible from Mayoral Drive and Greys Avenue was constructed in the 1970s.

== Public art ==
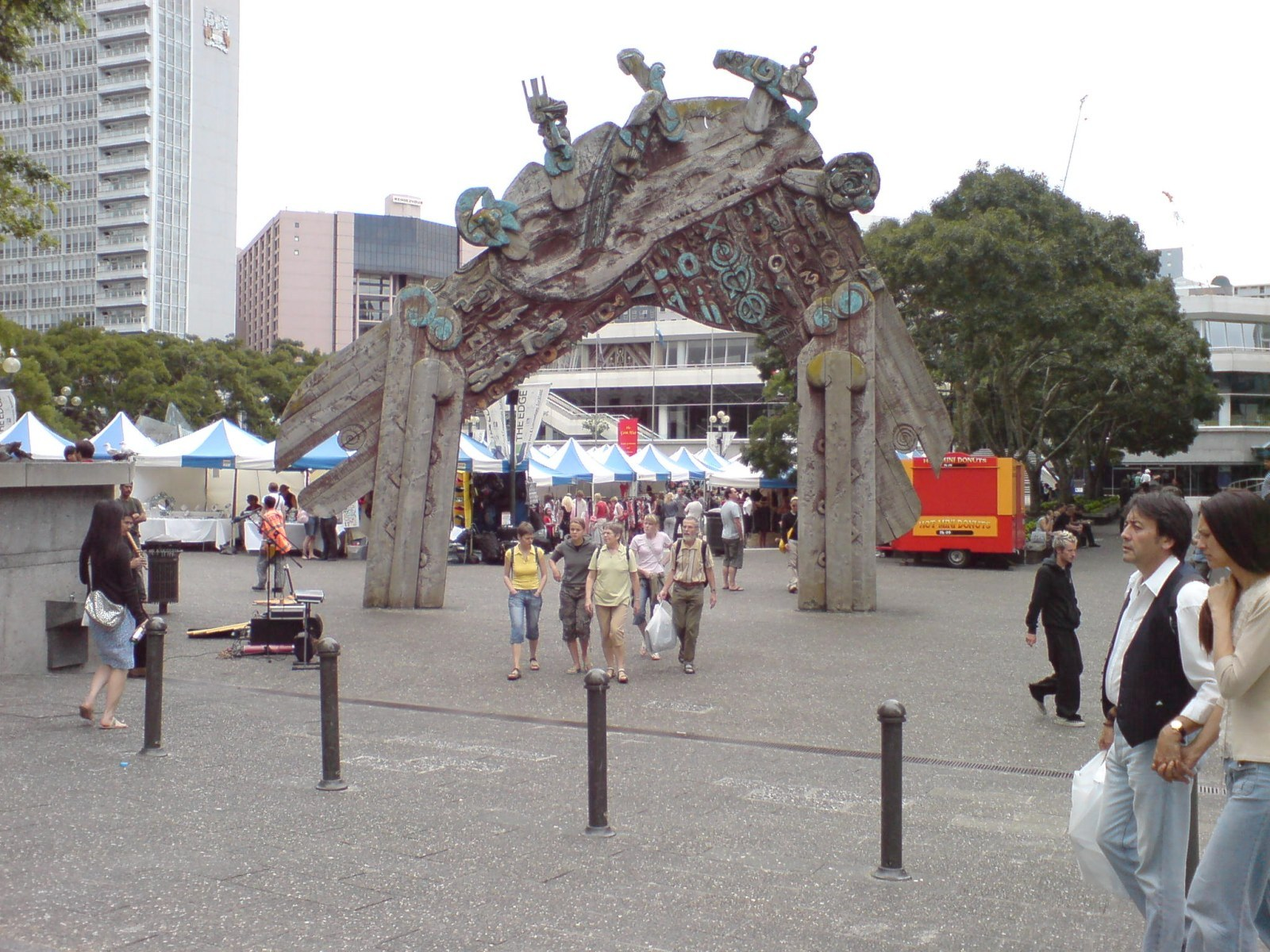
The Waharoa gate combines Māori elements with strong Polynesian influences and forms a symbolic entrance to the square (pictured in 2007)

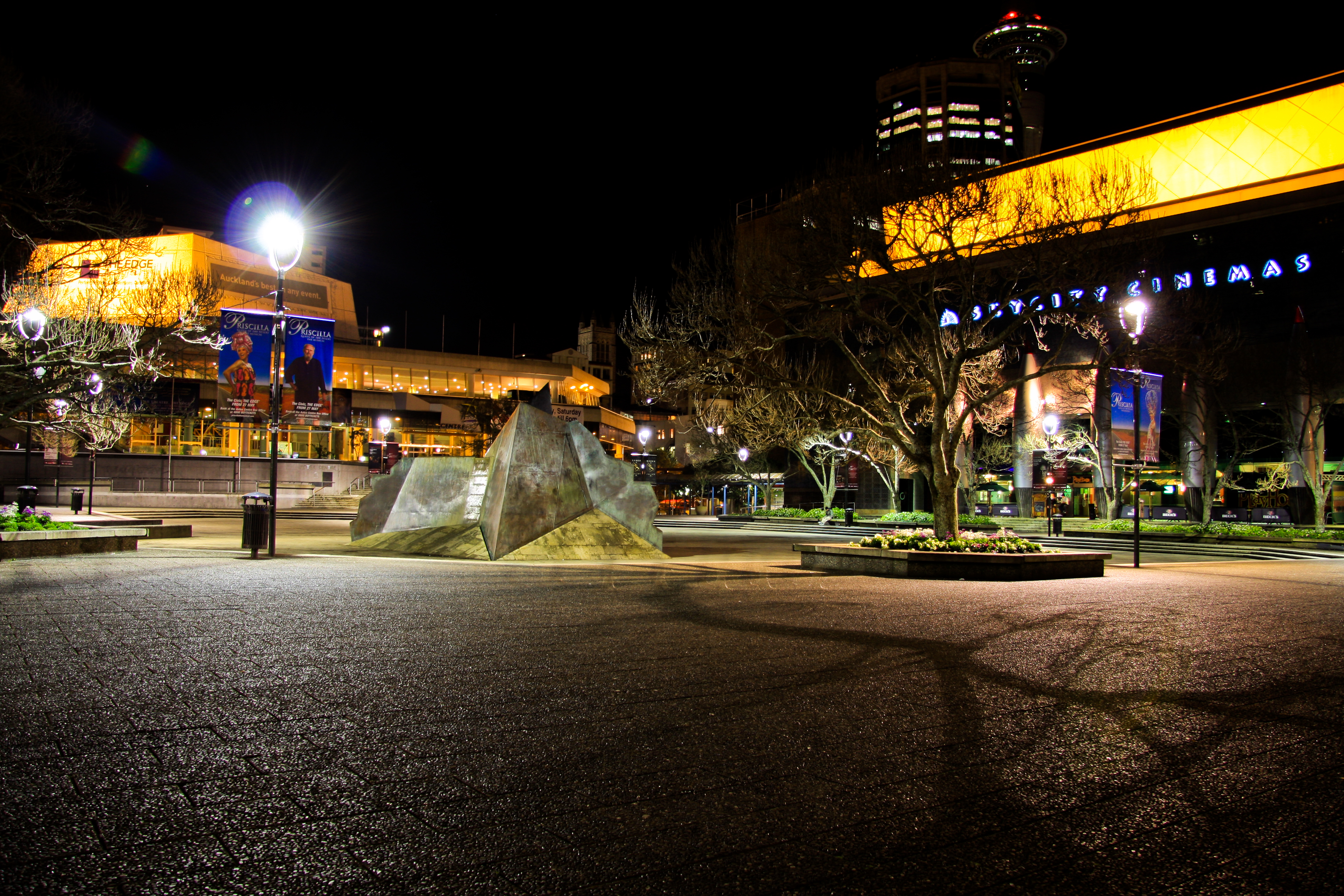
Mountain Fountain was the square's centerpiece from its unveiling in 1981 until its removal in 2008 (pictured in 2008)

Map

A number of art works are in Aotea Square:

- At the Queen Street entrance is an arch called Waharoa (Gateway in Māori), formed in wood and copper by Selwyn Muru, a Māori sculptor. This is an expressionist version of a traditional Māori entry gate. It features symbols like birds, fish and the crescent moon and stars but also elements like the nuclear disarmament symbol, reflecting the modern influences on New Zealand art.
- In front of the Town Hall is a bronze statue of Sir Dove-Myer Robinson, a former mayor of Auckland. This work dates from 2003 and is by the New Zealand sculptor Toby Twiss.
- Near the Town Hall is a bronze figure of a Māori warrior by Lyndon Smith, commissioned in the 1960s for the lobby of the Auckland Saving Bank's new building on Queen Street. In 1997 the ASB presented it to the City of Auckland. [This item is currently in storage awaiting relocation]
- In the centre of the square was the Mountain Fountain sculpture by New Zealand sculptor Terry Stringer. This angular "mountain" was commissioned in 1979 to form the centre piece for the new square, and its form echoes the roofline of the contemporary Aotea Centre. In 2009 media controversy centred on the speculation that Council prefers to permanently remove the fountain, despite having assured its sculptor that it will return after the maintenance work on the car park roof. The fountain was in fact later relocated to the forecourt of the Holy Trinity Cathedral in Parnell, though by then with the artist's agreement.
- In front of the Administration building is a 19th-century bronze statue of George Eden, Lord Auckland, Governor of India, after whom the city of Auckland is named. This statue was originally erected in Calcutta and was purchased from the government of India by Auckland City Council in the early 1960s.
- In April 2011 Auckland Council placed in the square a large temporary sculpture by Japanese artist Ujino, titled Dragonhead and said to represent the homogeneity of consumer culture and globalisation.

== See also ==
- Cathedral Square, Christchurch
- Civic Square, Wellington
- The Octagon, Dunedin
