= Judith Binney =

New Zealand writer, academic and historian

Dame Judith Binney DNZM FRSNZ
- Binney in 2004
- Born: Judith May Caroline Musgrove; 1 July 1940; Australia
- Died: 15 February 2011 (aged 70); Auckland, New Zealand
- Education: University of Auckland
- Spouses: Don Binney; Sebastian Black
- Scientific career
- Fields: New Zealand history
- Workplaces: University of Auckland

Dame Judith Mary Caroline Binney DNZM FRSNZ (née Musgrove; 1 July 1940 – 15 February 2011) was a New Zealand historian, writer and emerita professor of history at the University of Auckland. Her work focused on religion in New Zealand, especially the Māori Ringatū religion founded by Te Kooti Arikirangi Te Turuki and continued by Rua Kenana. She also wrote extensively on the history of Ngāi Tūhoe.

== Biography ==
Binney was born in Australia in 1940, the daughter of Sydney Musgrove, who was appointed professor of English at Auckland University College in 1947. She graduated with a first-class honours degree in history from the University of Auckland in 1965, and started work at the university as a lecturer in the History Department the next year. She retired as professor of history in 2004. She wrote biographies of both Te Kooti and Kenana, as well as a book on Kenana's followers, and another on Pākehā missionary Thomas Kendall. With Judith Bassett and Erik Olssen she wrote People and the Land, a history of New Zealand aimed at readers of high-school level.

For services to historical research, she was appointed a Companion of the New Zealand Order of Merit in the 1997 New Year Honours. In the 2006 New Year Honours, she was promoted to Distinguished Companion of the same order. In 2009 she accepted redesignation as a Dame Companion of the New Zealand Order of Merit, following the restoration of titular honours by the New Zealand government.

In 1998 she was made a Fellow of the Royal Society of New Zealand. She was awarded a three-year James Cook Research Fellowship in 1999 for research on the history of Urewera. She was awarded $60,000 at the Prime Minister's Awards for Literary Achievement in 2006. Prime Minister of New Zealand Helen Clark stated: "Judith Binney’s work plays a vital role in recording our history, with a focus on Māori communities. Her writing draws on oral histories and communal memories, and uses photographic sources as an integral part of the written historical discourse."

In 2007, Binney was named an inaugural fellow of the New Zealand Academy of Humanities, and she was a historical consultant for Vincent Ward's film, Rain of the Children (2008).

In 2010, she won the New Zealand Post Book of the Year and General Non-fiction Award for Encircled Lands: Te Urewera, 1820–1921 (Bridget Williams Books). The book documents Tūhoe's quest for self-government of their lands, granted to them in law more than a century ago.

Binney was married twice: to painter Don Binney, and later to fellow academic Sebastian Black (1937–2015).

== Death ==
On 4 December 2009, Binney received serious head injuries after being struck by a truck while crossing Princes St in Auckland City. On 15 February 2011, she died in her Auckland home, aged 70, of an illness unrelated to the accident. She was survived by her husband, Sebastian Black.

== Legacy ==
More than any other historian Binney highlighted the fundamental differences in the belief systems of Māori (especially Tūhoe) and European civilisation in New Zealand. She showed great understanding of the traditional manner of non-linear thinking of Māori that lasted long into the post contact period and has strong echos in the 21st century and was a strong advocate of Māori separatism. In particular she showed how understanding Māori history is based on what she named the myth narrative, where ancient stories are interwoven with new events to create newer myth narratives. She emphasised that Māori history has a quite different purpose to Western history, with its strong emphasis on preserving and enhancing the mana of a whānau or hapū rather than examining and explaining historical events in a sequential, rational manner based on documented evidence.

She contrasted strongly the Māori belief in evidence based on mysticism, spirits, prophesy, in song and stories to explain why events happen with the quite different Western system. In particular she offered readers a clear insight into the Māori use of a non linear time scale, with events and people being switched back and forwards in time to support the theme of a myth narrative. The academic work she undertook laid the foundation and framework for the Treaty of Waitangi Tribunal settlement with Tūhoe which resolved many of the complicated issues to do with mana and resources that stretched back to 1863.

== Awards and honours ==
In 2017, she was selected as one of the Royal Society of New Zealand's "150 women in 150 words". In 2025, Binney's 2015 book, Tangata Whenua: An illustrated history, co-authored with Aroha Harris and Atholl Anderson, was listed in Books of Mana as one of the 180 most significant works of Māori-authored non-fiction.

== 1986 fire bombing ==
An 31 October 2022 article in The New Zealand Herald recounts a claim that Judith Binney was the target of a fire-bombing attack on 29 September 1986. A Molotov cocktail was thrown into the house of Binney's neighbour, Michael Neill (an English Professor at the University of Auckland, and brother of actor Sam Neill). Binney had been told by a student that the activist group Ahi Kaa "'was planning to take action against her' to show their contempt for a Pākehā historian wanting to write about Māori." Binney and her husband Sebastian Black "had gone out for the evening. Black asked Neill to keep an eye on the house: 'It would be terrible if we got firebombed,' he told [Neill]." Neill's account is given in an October 2022 article in the London Review of Books.

== Books ==
Author

- The Legacy of Guilt: A Life of Thomas Kendall (Oxford University Press, 1968).
- Mihaia : The Prophet Rua Kenana and His Community at Maungapohatu (with Gillian Chaplin and Craig Wallace. Oxford University Press, 1979).
- Ngā Mōrehu: The Survivors (with Gillian Chaplin. Oxford University Press, 1986).
- The People and The Land: Te Tangata me Te Whenua: An Illustrated History of New Zealand, 1820–1920 (with Judith Bassett and Erik Olssen. Allen & Unwin, 1990).
- Redemption Songs: A Life of Te Kooti Arikirangi Te Turuki (Bridget Williams Books, 1995).
- Encircled lands: Te Urewera, 1820–1921 (Bridget Williams Books, 2009).

Editor

- The Shaping of History: Essays from the New Zealand Journal of History, 1967–1999 (Bridget Williams Books, 2001).
