= Diane Brand =

New Zealand architecture academic

- Other name: Diane Joy Brand
- Education: University of Auckland
- Scientific career
- Fields: coastal urban development
- Workplaces: University of Auckland Victoria University of Wellington
- Thesis: Southern crossings : colonial urban design in Australia and New Zealand (2001)

Diane Joy Brand is a New Zealand architecture academic. She is currently a full professor at the University of Auckland.

== Academic career ==
After a BArch at Auckland in 1979 and practising professionally, Brand did a post-professional master's of architecture in urban design at Harvard. Returning to Auckland for a PhD, her 2001 doctoral thesis was titled Southern crossings: colonial urban design in Australia and New Zealand. She subsequently entered academia, working at both Victoria University of Wellington (rising to full professor in 2011) and then back to the University of Auckland.

Much of Brand's work concerns 'bluespace'—coastal urban design.

Brand is a member of both the New Zealand Institute of Architects and the Royal Australian Institute of Architects and has been involved with CERA, rebuilding Christchurch after the earthquakes. She is also on the New Zealand Registered Architects Board.

== Selected works ==
- Brand, Diane. "Bluespace: a typological matrix for port cities." Urban Design International 12, no. 2-3 (2007): 69–85.
- Brand, Diane. "Surveys and sketches: 19th‐century approaches to colonial urban design." Journal of Urban Design 9, no. 2 (2004): 153–175.
