= Myers Park, Auckland =

Park and kindergarten in New Zealand

Coordinates: 36.855364°S 174.761217°E

Myers Park
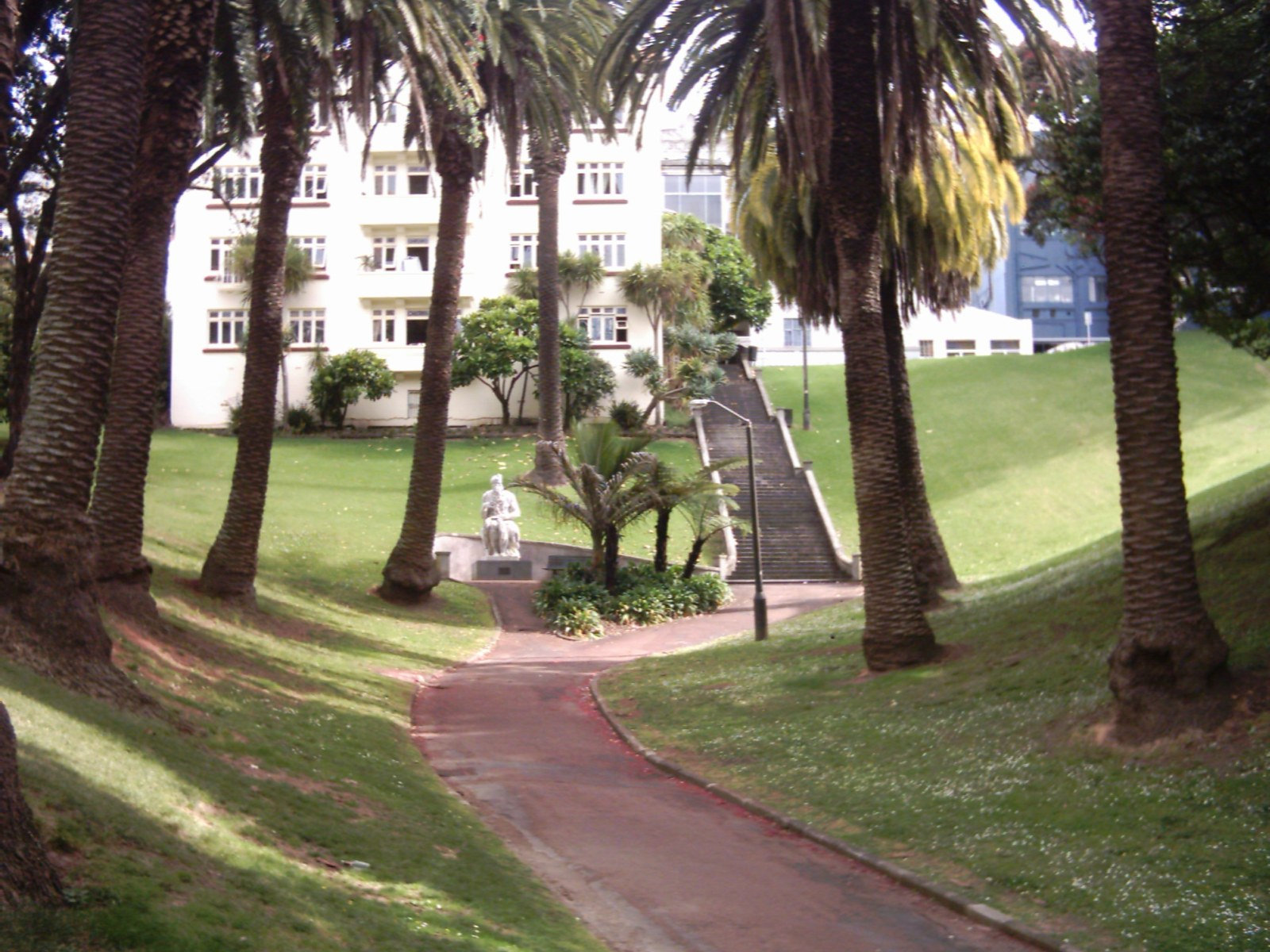
- The palm-lined main path, upper part of the park.
- Interactive map of Myers Park
- Type: Public park
- Location: Auckland, New Zealand
- Area: 2.4 hectares (5.9 acres)
- Created: 1914
- Operator: Auckland Council
- Status: Open year round

Heritage New Zealand – Historic Area
- Designated: 12 December 1994
- Reference no.: 7008

Myers Park is a narrow park in central Auckland, New Zealand, running parallel to the upper part of Queen Street. It is characterised by steep, grassed slopes and canopied with a mixture of large exotic and native trees, including an alley of large palm trees.

A playground, benches, and various artworks are features of the park. Paths cross the park connecting to Queen Street, K Road, Grey's Avenue and Aotea Square.

== History ==
Myers Park is located at the southern end of the Queen Street Valley. This area was historically settled by Maori. By the 1860s working-class housing had developed in and around the gully. Near the end of the century the gully and surrounds had become slum-like. This led to a push for beautification in the area.

In 1913, following the announcement of the city beautification plan by the then Auckland Mayor James Parr, he approached Arthur Myers with a proposal to financially support the transformation of the deteriorating gully. He agreed and gifted £9,000 to the Auckland City Council in order to purchase land in the gully and create an inner city park. He later followed this up with more money for the playground and the kindergarten building. Myers' sister-in-law, Martha Washington Shainwald, was a supporter of parks as a way to improve the health and well-being of children. The park and kindergarten was envisioned as a 'symbol of progress'.

Supporters championed the park as beneficial to the commonweal, specifically they believed it would improve the health of working-class mothers and their children.

Buildings surrounding the park were cleared and the park was opened on 28 January 1915 by Mayor Christopher Parr. It was named after Arthur Myers. Myers said on the day of the opening: "I trust this park will be a source of joy to the citizens of Auckland, present and future. It is the people's property, may they treasure it as their own, seek enjoyment and recreation within its boundaries, and make it an agency for the promotion of the public good."

When the park was first being laid out, people donated native New Zealand plants for the project. It has been reported that there was discussions within Myers Park on national-identity and what it meant to be a New Zealander. This gave rise to an interest in local products, plants and animals. It is said that the kiwi and silver fern were used for the first time as national symbols.

== Myers Kindergarten Building ==
Myers Kindergarten
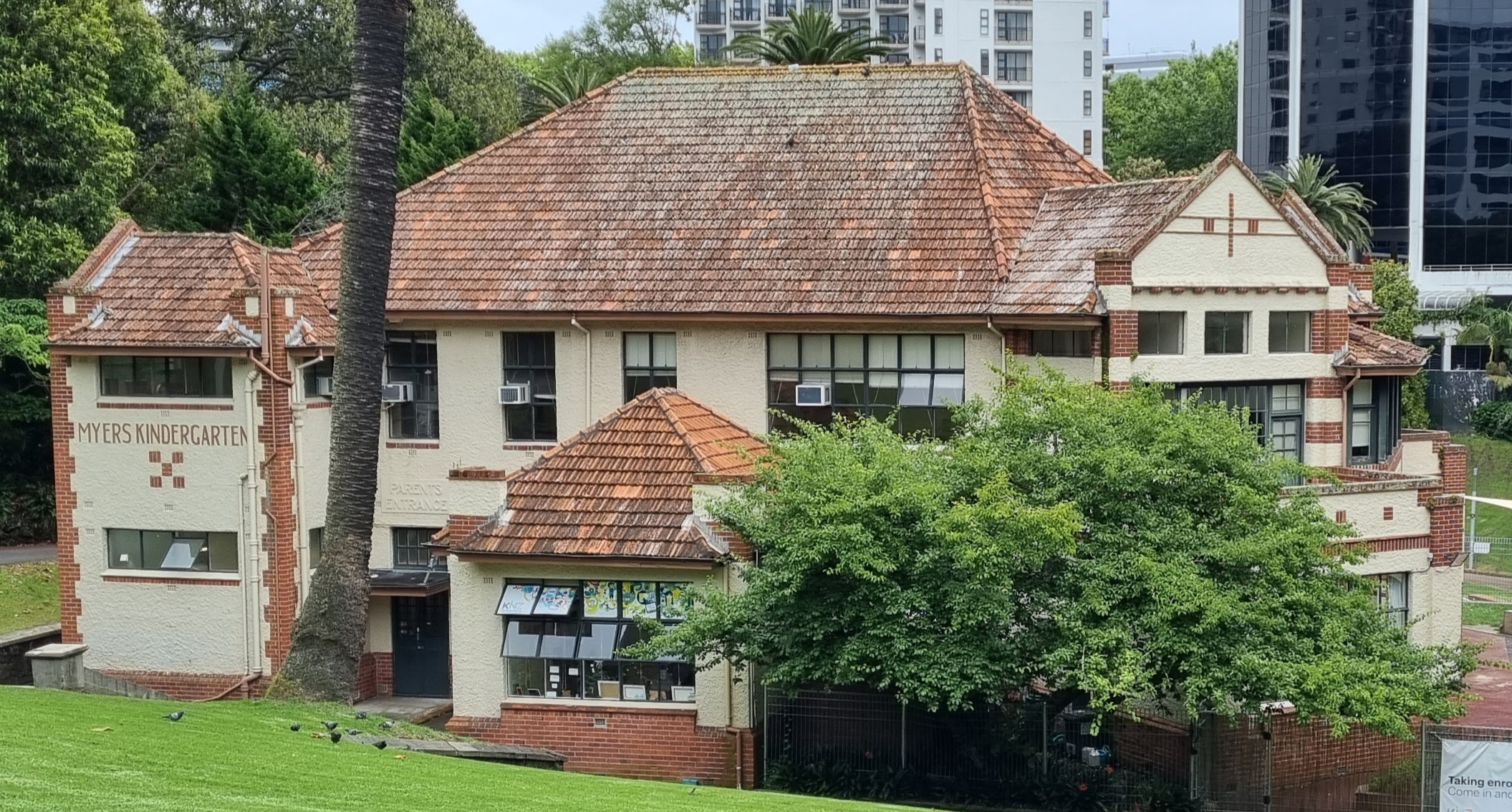
- Myers Free Kindergarten building in Myers Park.

General information
- Type: Kindergarten
- Architectural style: Arts and Crafts
- Location: Auckland, New Zealand, 381 Queen Street, Auckland
- Current tenants: KiNZ
- Construction started: 1915
- Completed: 1917

Design and construction
- Architecture firm: Chilwell & Trevithick

Heritage New Zealand – Category 2
- Designated: 26 November 1981
- Reference no.: 619

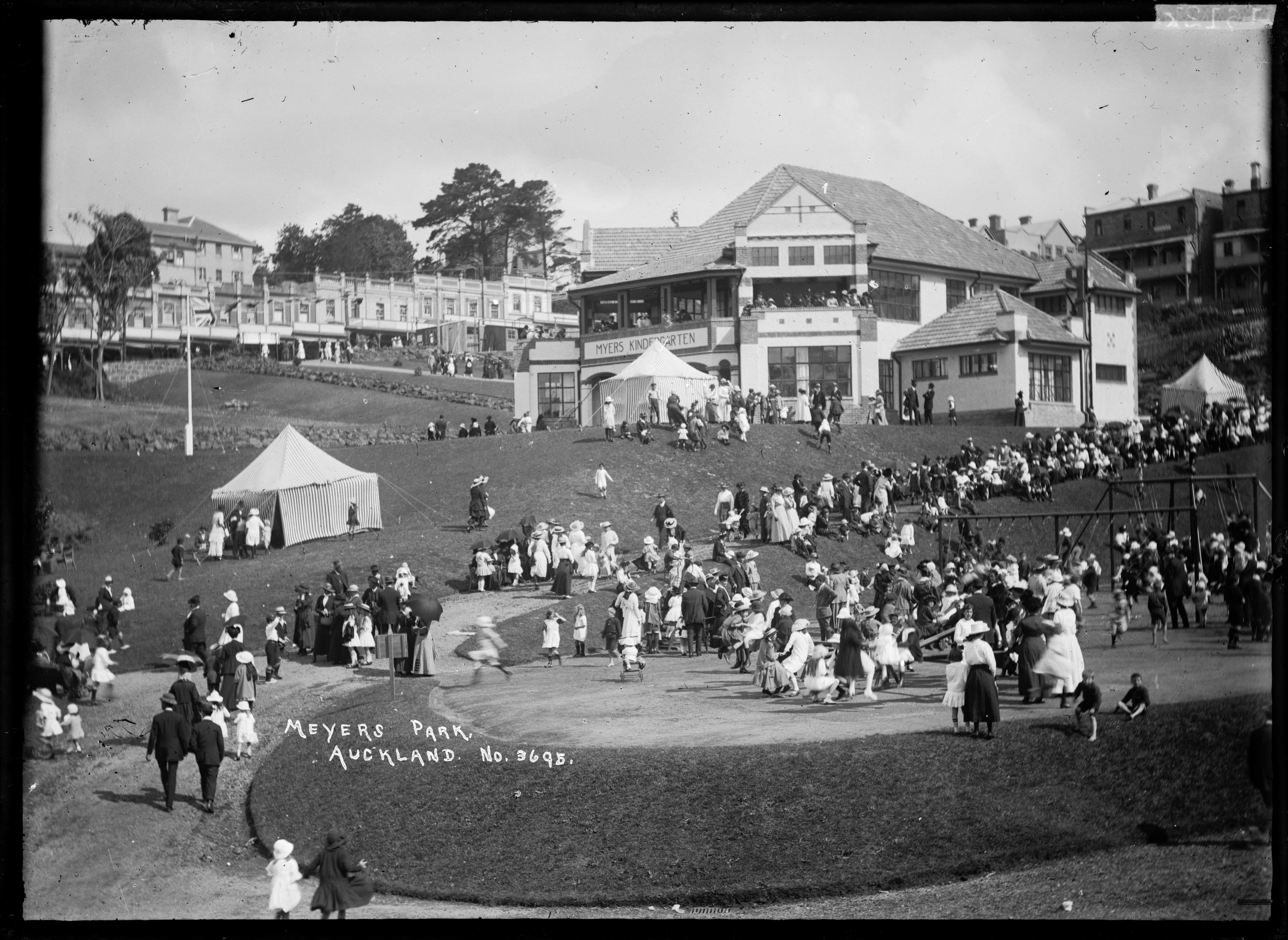
Crowd alongside Myers Kindergarten, around 1917.

The Myers Kindergarten was funded by Arthur Myers.

In November, 1916 the Myers Kindergarten opened. The arts and craft building has a circular layout with a central room that diverges into smaller classrooms. As of 2024 it is used as an early learning centre by the Auckland Kindergarten Association.

The kindergarten was designed with children in mind and several of the design choices reflect that: the interior walls are curved instead of having sharp edges, large doors opened out right onto the park, the interior was painted green and white as a way to connect the children with nature, and the texture of the building was meant to be similar to the pathways of the park.

During the 1918 influenza pandemic the building was used as a children's hospital.

During the lockdowns of the COVID-19 pandemic the building was renovated.

The building is listed by Heritage New Zealand as a Category II Historic Building, and the park itself is registered as Historic Area.

== Other features ==
The park also contains the caretaker's cottage, one of only two kauri buildings on Queen Street that are more than 100 years old, and a Moses statue near one of the staircases.
