= Selwyn Muru =

New Zealand artist and broadcaster (1937–2024)

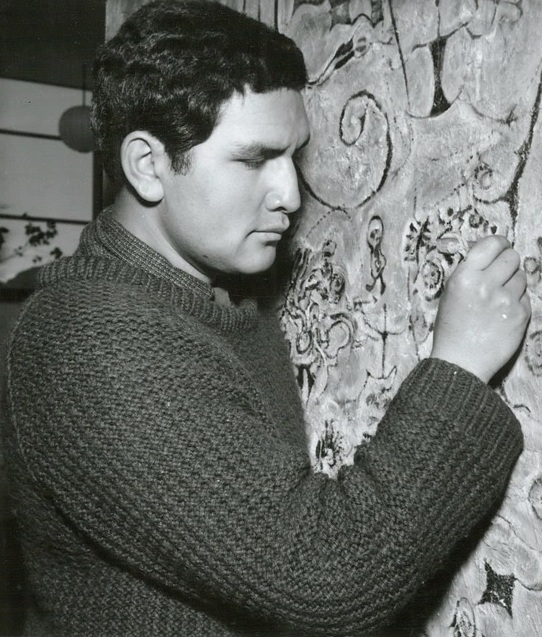
- Muru in 1966
- Born: Selwyn Frederick Muru; 6 August 1937; Te Hāpua, New Zealand
- Died: 24 January 2024 (aged 86); Auckland, New Zealand
- Known for: Whaikōrero; broadcasting; fine art; performing arts
- Notable work: Waharoa (1990)

Selwyn Frederick Muru (6 September 1937 – 24 January 2024), also known as Herewini Murupaenga, was a New Zealand artist. Of Māori descent (Te Aupōuri, Ngāti Kurī), his life's work included painting, sculpture, journalism, broadcasting, directing, acting, set design, theatre, poetry, and whaikōrero. Muru was awarded the Te Tohu Aroha mō Te Arikinui Dame Te Atairangikaahu | Exemplary/Supreme Award in 1990 at the Creative New Zealand Te Waka Awards.

== Biography ==
Muru was born in Te Hāpua, Northland in 1937. He was Māori and affiliated with the iwi, Te Aupōuri and Ngāti Kurī. He was a self-taught artist, although he did receive some instruction from Kāterina Mataira while at Northland College. He went on to attend Ardmore Teachers' College specialising in arts and crafts. He taught at Matakana District High School and Huiarau Primary in Ruatāhuna. He became a part-time art tutor at Mount Eden Prison in 1962.

After a solo exhibition and a feature article in Te Ao Hou, by 1964 Muru had become established as an artist. In 1964, he worked on the John O’Shea (Pacific Films) feature film Runaway, where he was building sets and also had a small acting role. He began his broadcasting career in 1966.

An exhibition Muru curated in 1969, The Work of Maori Artists, was the first group show of contemporary Māori art at the National Art Gallery of New Zealand (now Te Papa). Muru has said: "Māori art has always been contemporary."

Muru, poet Hone Tuwhare and artist Para Matchitt founded the Māori Writers and Artists’ Association (Nga Puna Waihanga) in 1973. In 1990, Muru was awarded the New Zealand 1990 Commemoration Medal.

Muru died in the Auckland suburb of Point Chevalier on 24 January 2024, at the age of 86.

== Broadcasting ==
In 1967, Muru was appointed assistant to the Head of Programmes, New Zealand Broadcasting Corporation. In this role, he created Te Puna Wai Kōrero, 'a weekly current affairs programme in English on northern Māori issues'. He began presenting in the early 1970s on Te Reo o Te Pipiwharauroa, weekly current affairs in the Māori language (replacing Ted Nia).

The first Māori programme to air on prime-time television was Below Koha in 1982. Muru along with Aroaro Hond, Robert Puwhare, Mona Papali'i and Ernie Leonard were involved.

== Artwork ==
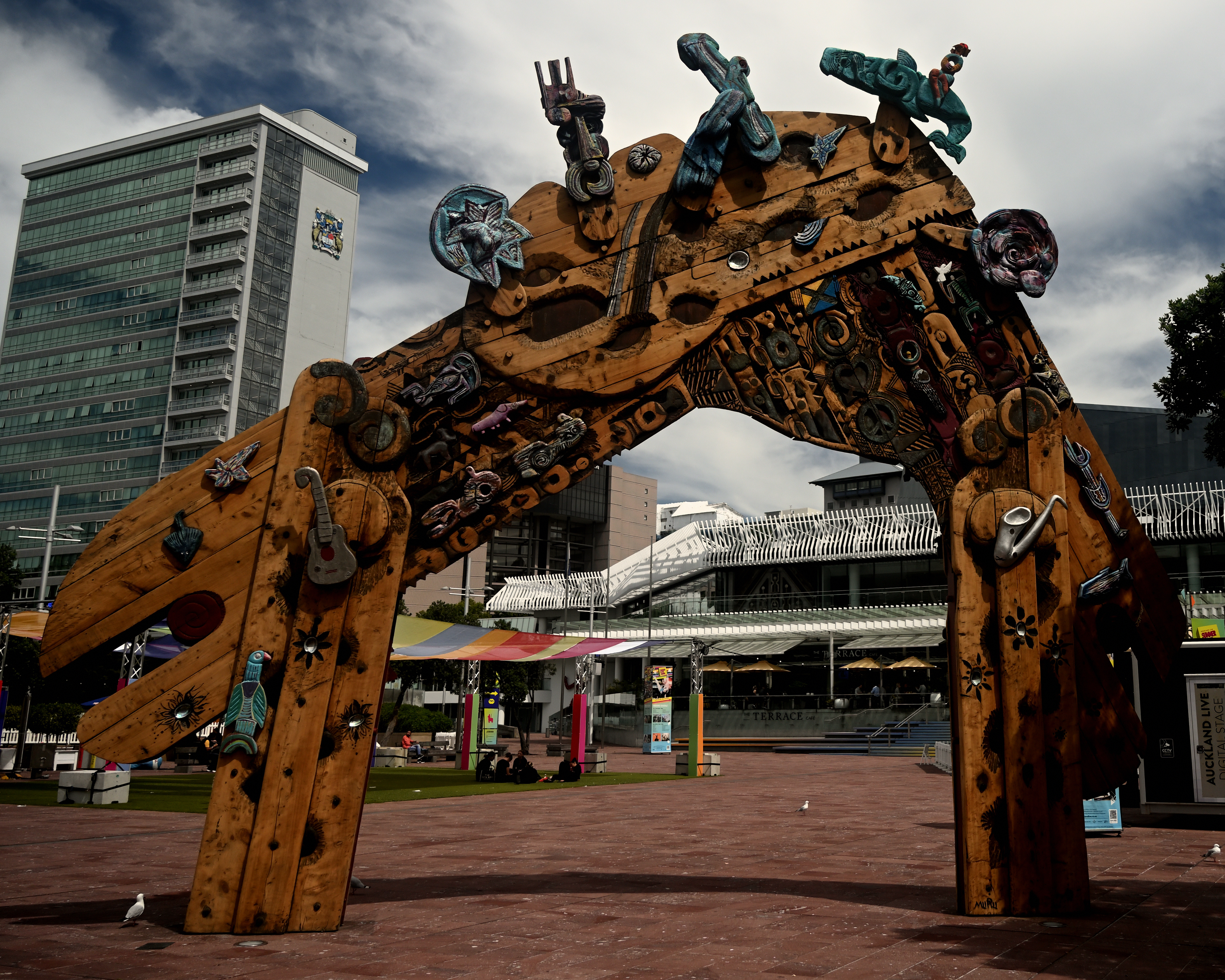
Waharoa (1990), a symbolic entrance to Aotea Square in Auckland, by Selwyn Muru

A significant public sculpture by Muru is Waharoa (1990), an entrance gate to Aotea Square in Auckland. Represented are carvings of Tama-nui-te-rā (god of the sun), Tangaroa (god of the sea), Tāne-mahuta (god of the forest), Tāwhiri-mātea (god of the elements) and Whetū me te Marama (the crescent moon and stars).

Muru's work with recycled timber in the 1980s has been described as a 'leitmotif' or recurrent theme amongst several Māori artists including Ralph Hotere, Para Matchitt and Bruce Stewart by art critic Rangihiroa Panaho. Panaho calls this a re-appropriation.

Curator Nigel Borell displayed two of Muru's artworks in the 2022 survey of contemporary Māori art Toi Tū Toi Ora at Auckland Art Gallery – Resurrections of Te Whiti over Taranaki (1975–77) and Te Whiti and Tohu over Taranaki (1975–77), paintings that feature the mountain Taranaki and the Māori leaders Te Whiti o Rongomai and Tohu Kākahi.

The New Zealand Portrait Gallery held a retrospective exhibition entitled Selwyn Muru: A Life's Work for three months starting in November 2022.

Collections that hold his work include Te Papa and Auckland Art Gallery.

=== Exhibitions ===
Selected exhibitions:

- Ikon Gallery, Auckland (1963)
- Contemporary New Zealand Art, Japan and South East Asia (1963)
- New Zealand Māori Council exhibition, National Art Gallery, Wellington (1969)
- Contemporary Maori Art, Waikato Museum of Art and History, Hamilton (1976)
- Kohia ko Taikaka Anake, National Art Gallery, Wellington (1990)
- Te Waka Toi: Contemporary Maori Art, tour to the United States (1992)
- Toi Tū Toi Ora: Contemporary Māori Art, Auckland Art Gallery (5 December 2020 – 9 May 2021)
