= Don Binney =

New Zealand artist (1940–2012)

- Born: 24 March 1940; Auckland, New Zealand
- Died: 14 September 2012 (aged 72); Auckland, New Zealand
- Education: Elam School of Fine Arts
- Known for: Painting
- Spouses: Judith Binney; Philippa Binney
- Children: 1

Donald Hall Binney OBE (24 March 1940 (Note: Sources—including Binney himself—are inconsistent on his age or date of birth, saying he was 72 or 73, yet born in 1940, resulting in a possible range of birth dates from 15 September 1938 to 14 September 1940. However 24 March 1940 seems likely to be correct, and more sources are starting to list his age as 72 as time passes.) – 14 September 2012) was a New Zealand painter, best known for his paintings of birds.

== Biography ==
Born and raised in Auckland, Binney was educated in Parnell, Auckland, taking classes with John Weeks and R B Sibson, who became his good friend and guide to the field of ornithology. From 1958 to 1961, he studied at Elam School of Fine Arts in Auckland, gaining a Diploma of Fine Arts. Binney's tutors included Ida Eisa, James Turkington, Robert Ellis and Robin Wood. In 1963, he held his first solo exhibition at Ikon Gallery, Auckland and began teaching at Mount Roskill Grammar School, where he taught until 1966.

In 1962, Binney began painting at Te Henga, and views of Puketotara with indigenous birds became a common motif in his artworks. In birdwatching, Binney said he discovered a passage into the landscape and the opportunity to develop a personal relationship with it.

Binney described himself as a figurative painter concerned with the psychic metaphor of the environment. Working in oil, acrylic, charcoal, ink and carbon pencil, many of his works depict the west coast of Auckland and Northland, containing sea, sky, native birds, still life and occasionally, figures.

Binney was appointed an Officer of the Order of the British Empire, for services to art, in the 1995 Queen's Birthday Honours. He was appointed as one of Waitakere City's inaugural arts laureates in 2004.

Binney died of a heart attack while in hospital in Auckland for an unrelated illness on 14 September 2012, at the age of 72, and was survived by his second wife Philippa and daughter Mary. His first wife was the historian Judith Binney.

== Exhibitions ==
Binney represented New Zealand at the Third Paris Biennale in 1963. In 1965, Binney was included in a survey show of New Zealand painting, held in London and in the "Eight NZ Artists" touring show of Australian state galleries. In 1967, he was the recipient of a Queen Elizabeth II Arts Council travel fellowship. He lived in Mexico, London and Australia, but returned to teach at Elam, becoming the senior lecturer in fine arts in 1979.

Binney has exhibited widely throughout New Zealand and was the subject of a thirty-year survey show at the Fisher Gallery, Pakuranga in 1989. He also had a retrospective exhibition curated by Damien Skinner that toured the country from 2003 to 2004. His work is represented in many public collections including the Auckland Art Gallery, The University of Auckland and Te Papa.

== Selected works ==
- Eastern Journey 1962 view
- Pipiwharauroa mating 1963 view
- Southern Journey 1964 view
- Colonial Garden Bird 1965 view
- Sun shall not burn Thee by day nor moon by night 1966 view
- Pond Bird, Te Henga 1967 view
- Canterbury Garden Bird 1970 view
- Te Henga from Man’s Head III 1971 view
- Landscape 1974 view
- Winter Maungaroa 1981 view
