= Robert Ellis (artist) =

British-born New Zealand artist (1929–2021)

Robert Ellis ONZM
- Born: Robert Wallace Ellis; 2 April 1929; Northampton, England
- Died: 23 November 2021 (aged 92)
- Education: Royal College of Art
- Known for: Painter
- Movement: Modernism
- Spouse: Shelia Kathleen Wilson (m. 1951; div. 1966) Elizabeth Aroha Mountain (m. 1966)
- Children: 2

Robert Wallace Ellis ONZM (2 April 1929 – 23 November 2021) was a British-New Zealand painter and artist known for paintings that tackle social, cultural, and environmental themes.

== Early life and family ==
Born in Northampton, England, on 2 April 1929, Ellis studied at Northampton School of Art from 1944 to 1947, before completing his national service with the photographic unit of RAF Bomber Command between 1947 and 1949. He was awarded a scholarship to attend the Royal College of Art from 1949 to 1953 graduating with a diploma. Ellis moved to New Zealand, with his then wife Shelia Kathleen Ellis, nee Wilson (1928–1990) in 1957 to take up a position as lecturer in design at Elam School of Fine Arts. They arrived on the "Dominion Monarch". Shelia and Sharman Ellis (b. 30 April 1958) returned to England on the "Rangitiki", departing on 9 March 1960. Ellis filed for divorce in 1964, which was granted in 1966. He married Elizabeth Aroha Mountain (Ngāpuhi, Ngāti Porou) in 1966. The couple have twin daughters, Hana and Ngarino. and three grand-children, Emere, Hana, Takimoana. They lived in Auckland, in the house Robert helped build in 1969–70.

== Academic and artistic career ==
Ellis lectured at the Yeovil School of Art in Somerset from 1953 to 1957. After he moved to Auckland in 1957 he began teaching at Elam School of Fine Arts. In 1992 he was awarded a personal chair in 1992, and retired as a Professor Emeritus in 1994. During 1982 he was a visiting professor at Ohio State University.

Ellis served as a council member of the Auckland Society of Arts, and was the foundation president of the New Zealand Society of Industrial Designers. He was also a council member, secretary, and president of the New Zealand Society of Sculptors, Painters and Associates, and was a New Zealand delegate to the International Art Medal Federation. In the 2001 New Year Honours, Ellis was appointed an Officer of the New Zealand Order of Merit, for services to fine arts.

Ellis has been described as one of "New Zealand's pre-eminent artists" and he has held more than 60 solo exhibitions in New Zealand and around the world.

His landscape paintings address themes of urbanisation, subdivision and colonisation. Auckland Art Gallery senior curator Ron Brownson describes Ellis's place in modern New Zealand art: "As a major figure, Ellis' art addresses many cultural issues. His subjects range over tensions between transport and urbanism, contrast ecology with spirituality and look at the on-going nature of Māori–Pākehā relations."

His work was the focus of a major book published by Ron Sang in 2015, entitled Robert Ellis [see review below]. He continued to produce small works on paper in his studio at home.

Ellis died on 23 November 2021, aged 92.

== Work ==
Throughout his career Ellis produced a diverse range of works. They include not only paintings and works on paper, but also stained glass (design of the east wall of the nave in Holy Trinity Cathedral, Parnell), tapestry (the largest in the world at the time, and now in the Aotea Centre, Auckland), and medallions.
