= Mary and Peter Biggs Award for Poetry =

New Zealand literary award

The Mary and Peter Biggs Award for Poetry is an award at the Ockham New Zealand Book Awards, presented annually to the winner of the poetry category. The winner receives a NZ$10,000 prize.

== History ==
The New Zealand Book Awards were set up by the New Zealand Literary Fund, a government organisation, in 1976. Annual awards were presented for literary merit in fiction, non-fiction, poetry and (later) book production.

The Goodman Fielder Wattie Book Awards, New Zealand's other principal literary awards event, did not specifically award poetry prizes until 1994, when sponsorship was taken over by Montana Wines and the event's name was changed to the Montana Book Awards. In 1994 and 1995, the Montana Book Awards included a category for poetry.

In 1996, the two awards events were merged to create the Montana New Zealand Book Awards, and offering prizes in six categories, including poetry. In 2010, the New Zealand Post took over as sponsor, having supported the New Zealand Book Awards for Children and Young Adults for the previous 14 years.

In 2015, Auckland property development firm Ockham Residential assumed sponsorship of the awards. No prizes were presented in that year. The Poetry Award was presented from 2016 to 2019. In 2020, the name of the award was changed to the Mary and Peter Biggs Award for Poetry.

== Winners of the Mary and Peter Biggs Award for Poetry, 2020–present ==
- 2026: Nafanua Purcell Kersel, Black Sugarcane, Te Herenga Waka University Press
- 2025: Emma Neale, Liar, Liar, Lick, Spit, Otago University Press
- 2024: Grace Yee, Chinese Fish. Giramondo Publishing
- 2023: Alice Te Punga Somerville, Always Italicise: How to Write While Colonised. Auckland University Press.
- 2022: Joanna Preston, Tumble. Otago University Press
- 2021: Tusiata Avia, The Savage Coloniser Book. Victoria University Press
- 2020: Helen Rickerby, How to Live. Auckland University Press

== Winners of the Ockham New Zealand Book Award for Poetry, 2016–2019 ==
- 2019: Helen Heath, Are Friends Electric?. Victoria University Press
- 2018: Elizabeth Smither, Night Horse. Auckland University Press
- 2017: Andrew Johnston, Fits & Starts. Victoria University Press
- 2016: David Eggleton, The Conch Trumpet. Otago University Press

== Winners of the New Zealand Post Book Award for Poetry, 2010–2014 ==
- 2014: Vincent O'Sullivan, Us, Then. Victoria University Press
- 2013: Anne Kennedy, The Darling North. Auckland University Press
- 2012: Rhian Gallagher, Shift. Auckland University Press
- 2011: Kate Camp, The Mirror of Simple Annihilated Souls. Victoria University Press
- 2010: Brian Turner, Just This. Victoria University Press

== Winners of the Montana New Zealand Book Award for Poetry, 1996–2009 ==
- 2009: Jenny Bornholdt, The Rocky Shore. Victoria University Press
- 2008: Janet Charman, Cold Snack. Auckland University Press
- 2007: Janet Frame, The Goose Bath. Vintage
- 2006: Bill Manhire, Lifted. Victoria University Press
- 2005: Vincent O'Sullivan, Nice morning for it, Adam
- 2004: Anne Kennedy, Sing-song
- 2003: Glenn Colquhoun, Playing God
- 2002: Hone Tuwhare, Piggy-Back Moon
- 2001: Allen Curnow, The Bells of Saint Babels
- 2000: Elizabeth Smither, The Lark Quartet
- 1999: Vincent O'Sullivan, Seeing You Asked
- 1998: Hone Tuwhare, Shape-Shifter
- 1997: Jenny Bornholdt, Gregory O'Brien, Mark Williams, eds., Anthology of New Zealand Poetry in English
- 1996: Bill Manhire, My Sunshine

== Winners of the Montana Book Award for Poetry, 1994–1995 ==
- 1995, Michael Jackson, Pieces of Music
- 1994, Bill Manhire, ed., 100 New Zealand Poems

== Winners of the New Zealand Book Award for Poetry, 1976–1995 ==
- 1995: Michele Leggott, Dia
- 1994: Andrew Johnston, How to Talk
- 1993: Brian Turner, Beyond
- 1992: Bill Manhire, Milky Way Bar
- 1991: Cilla McQueen, Berlin Diary
- 1990: Elizabeth Smither, A Pattern of Marching
- 1989: Cilla McQueen, Benzina
- 1988: Anne French, All Cretans are Liars
- 1987: Allen Curnow, The Loop in Lone Kauri Road
- 1987: Elizabeth Nannestad, Jump
- 1986: Kendrick Smithyman, Stories About Wooden Keyboards
- 1985: Bill Manhire, Zoetropes
- 1984: Fleur Adcock, Selected Poems
- 1983: Allen Curnow, You Will Know When You Get There
- 1983: Cilla McQueen, Homing In
- 1982: Alistair Campbell, Collected Poems
- 1981: Michael Jackson, Wall
- 1988: Allen Curnow, An Incorrigible Music
- 1979: Kevin Ireland, Literary Cartoons
- 1978: Bill Manhire, How to Take Your Clothes Off at a Picnic
- 1978: Ian Wedde, Spells for Coming Down
- 1977: Ruth Dallas, Walking in the Snow
- 1977: Alan Loney, Dear Mondrian
- 1976: Louis Johnson, Fires and Patterns
- 1976: C.K. Stead, Quesada

== See also ==
- List of poetry awards
- List of years in poetry
- List of years in literature
