= Bill Manhire =

New Zealand poet, short story writer and professor

Bill Manhire CNZM
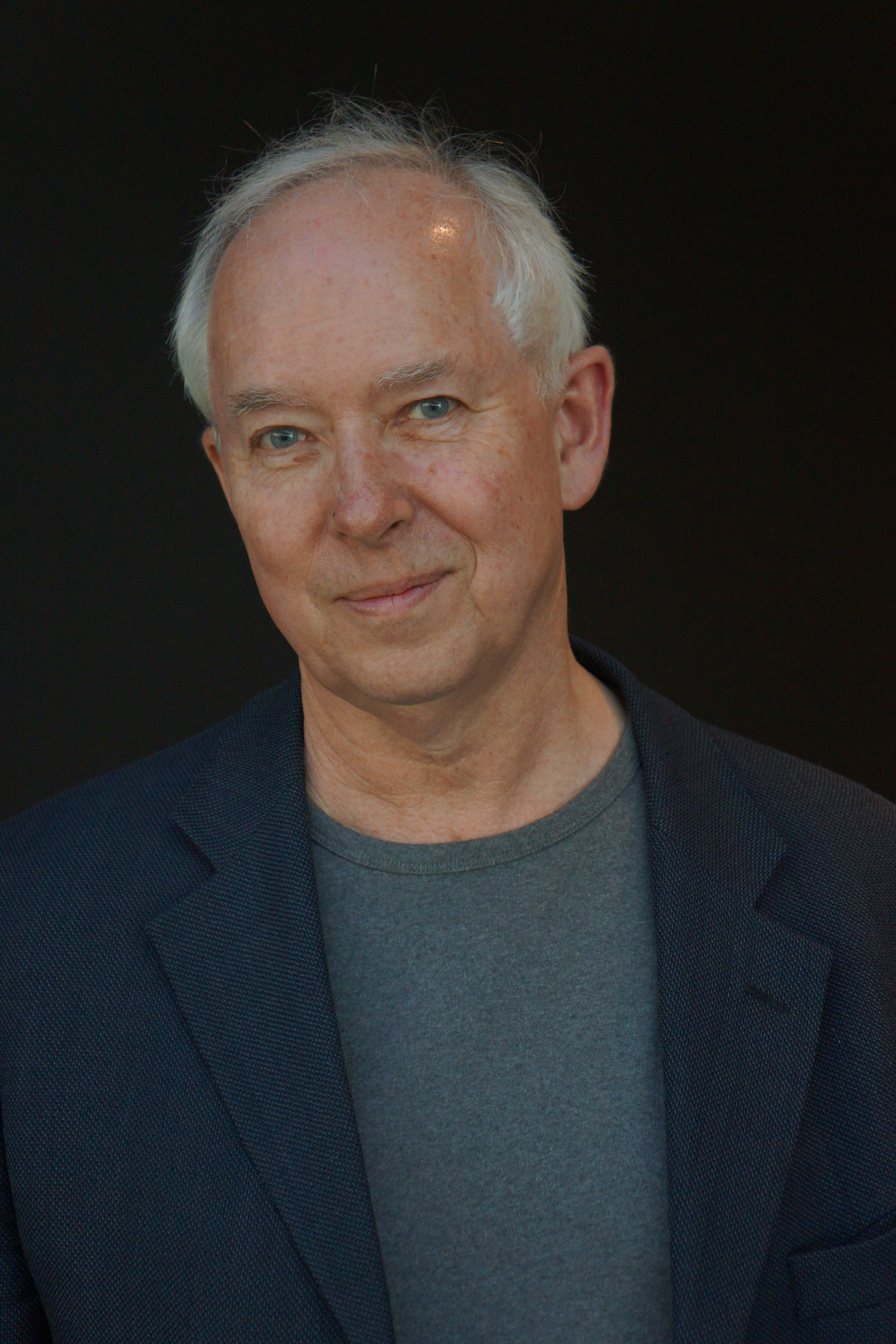
- Manhire in 2012
- Born: 27 December 1946 (age 79); Invercargill, New Zealand
- Education: University of Otago; University College London
- Occupations: Poet, short story writer, emeritus professor
- Spouse: Marion McLeod
- Children: 2, including Toby Manhire

William Manhire CNZM (born 27 December 1946) is a New Zealand poet, short story writer, emeritus professor, and New Zealand's inaugural Poet Laureate (1997–1998). He founded New Zealand's first creative writing course at Victoria University of Wellington in 1975, founded the International Institute of Modern Letters in 2001, and has been a strong promoter of New Zealand literature and poetry throughout his career. Many of New Zealand's leading writers graduated from his courses at Victoria. He has received many notable awards including a Prime Minister's Award for Literary Achievement in 2007 and an Arts Foundation Icon Award in 2018.

The Oxford Companion to New Zealand Literature (2006) states that he is "recognised as among the two or three finest New Zealand poets of his generation", and literary critic Peter Simpson has observed that Manhire has "probably done more to widen the audience for poetry in New Zealand than any other individual".

== Early life ==
Manhire was born in Invercargill. His mother was from Scotland with a degree in science, and his father was a publican; they had met and married during World War II, and his mother sailed to New Zealand on a ship of war brides on Valentine's Day in 1946. In his memoir Under the Influence (2003), he described growing up in different small town South Island pubs. He attended Otago Boys' High School, and later the University of Otago in Dunedin where he received his B.A. in 1967, his M.A. (with honours) in 1968, and his M.Litt. in 1970. He went on to study Norse sagas at University College London (1970–73, M.Phil.).

As a young writer, Manhire sent some poetry to Charles Brasch; of this work, Manhire later said, "I can't remember the exact contents, but I think they had lines like 'I stalk the streets of the midnight city' and were full of soiled sheets and neon and terrible things like that". He said he was "enormously encouraged" by Brasch's response, which encouraged him to keep trying and to take himself seriously as a writer. Other writers Manhire met in Dunedin included Iain Lonie, Trevor Reeves and James K. Baxter.

== Career ==
In the 1960s, while still an undergraduate at the University of Otago, Manhire had his first poems published in New Zealand journals, including notably the journal Landfall, then edited by Robin Dudding. While studying in London in the early 1970s he had poems published in British magazines. His first book was a poem, Malady, published in 1970. It consisted of just four words ("malady", "melody" and "my lady") arranged in patterns on the page, accompanied by drawings by artist Ralph Hotere, who had met Manhire in Dunedin while he was the Frances Hodgkins Fellow. Manhire's second book, The Elaboration (1972), was also a collaboration with Hotere, and was published by Charles Brasch and Janet Paul. Around this time, and while living in London, Manhire and fellow poet Kevin Cunningham set up the Amphedesma Press to publish their own and their friends' work, including poetry books by Ian Wedde and Bob Orr.

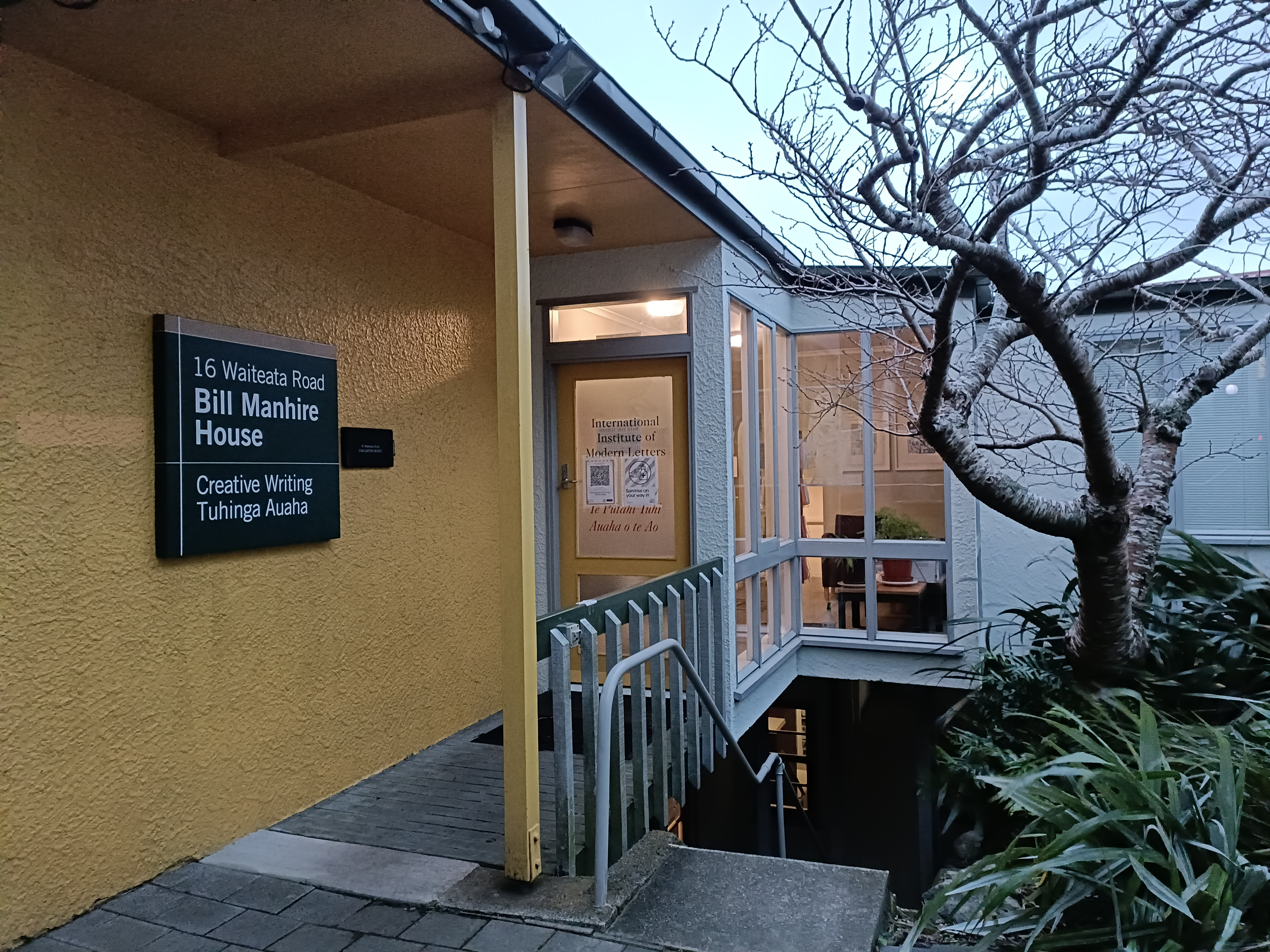
Entrance to the Bill Manhire House at the International Institute of Modern Letters

In 1973, after returning to New Zealand, Manhire began lecturing in the English department of Victoria University of Wellington, where he founded New Zealand's first creative writing course in 1975. His creative writing course, which he taught for more than 25 years, had a major influence on New Zealand literature, with many well-known New Zealand writers having graduated, including Elizabeth Knox, Barbara Anderson and Jenny Bornholdt. Mutes & Earthquakes (1997) was an anthology of works by his former students; the introduction by Manhire begins with two pieces of advice: "1. Write what you know, and / 2. Write what you don't know". From 2001 to 2013 he was the inaugural and founding director of the International Institute of Modern Letters, which offers an MA and Ph.D. in creative writing, as well as a range of specialised undergraduate workshops. Students of the Institute have included Eleanor Catton, Catherine Chidgey and Hinemoana Baker. In 2016 the institute's building was named the Bill Manhire House in recognition of his contribution to the university and to New Zealand literature. His successor Damien Wilkins said on the occasion that Manhire's name "is synonymous with creative writing at Victoria".

Manhire has published a number of poetry collections, including notably his Collected Poems (2001). His poetry is known for word-play, experimentation and his ironic and whimsical sense of humour. Critic Iain Sharp writes that Manhire's reputation "rests on a solid, seriously intentioned body of work, notable for its oblique lyricism and sense of wonder at the strangeness of both life and language". After his fifth book of poetry, Good Looks (1982), Manhire for a time switched to writing prose, publishing The Brain of Katherine Mansfield (1988), a book in the style of the Choose Your Own Adventure series with illustrations by Gregory O'Brien, and The New Land (1990), a collection of satirical short stories. In 1986 he wrote a critical study of fellow New Zealand writer Maurice Gee.

In 1998, Manhire went to Antarctica for several weeks with poet Chris Orsman and painter Nigel Brown, as part of the Artists to Antarctica programme run by Antarctica New Zealand. The experience inspired a number of poems which formed the basis of his collection What to Call Your Child (1999), as well as a subsequent anthology of writing about Antarctica called The Wide White Page: Writers Imagine Antarctica (2004) which he edited and introduced. For the 25th anniversary of the Erebus air disaster in 2004, Manhire wrote the poem "Erebus Voices", which was read by Sir Edmund Hillary at the commemorative service at Scott Base, Antarctica.

Throughout his career Manhire has been a significant promoter of New Zealand poetry and other local writing, acting as editor of several compilations of New Zealand works, including NZ Listener Short Stories (1977), Some Other Country: New Zealand's Best Short Stories (with his wife Marion McLeod, 1984, with updated editions published in 1992, 1997 and 2007) and Six by Six: Short Stories by New Zealand's Best Writers (1989). His collection of New Zealand poetry, 100 New Zealand Poems (1993), proved particularly popular, and was subsequently expanded to become 121 New Zealand Poems (2005). He was a founding publisher of the online Best New Zealand Poems series, which began in 2000. For many years he presented a poetry segment on the Kim Hill Show on Radio New Zealand. To mark his 60th birthday in 2006, Victoria University Press and Sport published the limited edition Manhire at 60: A Book for Bill. The book featured essays, poems, stories and other written work from over 40 writers who had been inspired by Manhire.

Manhire has regularly worked collaboratively with other artists and creators during his career, including with the artist Ralph Hotere, physicist Paul Callaghan, composer Norman Meehan and singer Hannah Griffin. His work with Meehan and Griffin has resulted in a range of music publications with lyrics or words by Manhire, including Buddhist Rain (2010) and These Rough Notes (2012).

== Awards and honours ==
Manhire has received a number of New Zealand's most prestigious literary awards and fellowships, including the Katherine Mansfield Menton Fellowship in 2004, an Arts Foundation Laureate Award in 2004 and the Prime Minister's Award for Literary Achievement in 2007. He received the Lilian Ida Smith Award in 1987 for fiction and in 1989 for poetry. He was appointed the first New Zealand Poet Laureate in 1996, and from January to May 1999 was the Fulbright visiting professor in New Zealand studies at Georgetown University.

In the 2005 Queen's Birthday Honours, he was appointed a Companion of the New Zealand Order of Merit for services to literature, and that same year received an honorary doctorate of literature from the University of Otago. In 2010 he was appointed a fellow of the Royal Society of New Zealand Te Apārangi. In 2015 he was the UNESCO visiting professor of creative writing at the University of East Anglia. In 2018, the Arts Foundation of New Zealand bestowed on him the Icon Award, an award recognising New Zealand's greatest artists, which is limited to 20 living recipients. In 2021 he received an honorary doctorate of literature from University College London.

His work has won the Poetry Prize at the New Zealand Book Awards six times:

- 1978: How to Take Your Clothes Off at the Picnic
- 1985: Zoetropes
- 1992: Milky Way Bar
- 1994: 100 New Zealand Poems (as editor)
- 1996: My Sunshine
- 2006: Lifted

== Notable students ==
- Lynn Jenner – New Zealand poet and essayist
- Laurence Fearnley – New Zealand writer (born 1963)

== Personal life ==
He is married to journalist Marion McLeod, and has two children, Vanessa and Toby, who are both journalists and writers.

== Selected works ==
=== Poetry ===
- 1970: Malady (with Ralph Hotere) (Dunedin: Amphedesma Press)
- 1972: The Elaboration (with Ralph Hotere) (Wellington: Square & Circle)
- 1977: How to Take Off Your Clothes at the Picnic (Wellington: Wai-te-ata Press)
- 1979: Dawn/Water (Eastbourne: Hawk Press)
- 1981: Zoetropes (London: The Murihiku Press)
- 1982: Good Looks (Auckland: Auckland University Press)
- 1984: Zoetropes: Poems 1972–82 (Wellington, Port Nicholson Press; Sydney: Allen & Unwin; Manchester: Carcanet Press)
- 1990: The Old Man's Example (Wellington: Wrist & Anchor Press)
- 1991: Milky Way Bar (Wellington: Victoria University Press; Manchester: Carcanet Press)
- 1995: Selected Poems (Wellington: Victoria University Press)
- 1996: My Sunshine (Wellington: Victoria University Press)
- 1996: Sheet Music: Poems 1967–1982 (Wellington: Victoria University Press)
- 1999: What to Call Your Child (Auckland: Godwit / Random House New Zealand)
- 2001: Collected Poems (Wellington: Victoria University Press; Manchester: Carcanet Press)
- 2005: Lifted (Wellington: Victoria University Press)
- 2005: Pine (with Ralph Hotere) (Dunedin: Otakou Press)
- 2010: The Victims of Lightning (Wellington: Victoria University Press)
- 2017: Some Things to Place in a Coffin (Wellington: Victoria University Press)
- 2020: Wow (Wellington: Victoria University Press; Manchester: Carcanet Press)
- 2026: Lyrical Ballads (Wellington: Te Herenga Waka University Press; Manchester: Carcanet Press)

=== Anthologies (edited) ===
- 1969: New Zealand Universities Arts Festival Yearbook 1969 (Dunedin: Caxton Press)
- 1977: NZ Listener Short Stories (Wellington: Methuen)
- 1978: NZ Listener Short Stories Volume 2 (Wellington: Methuen)
- 1984: Some Other Country: New Zealand's Best Short Stories (with Marion McLeod, revised editions published in 1992 and 1997) (Wellington: Port Nicholson Press)
- 1989: Six by Six: Short Stories by New Zealand's Best Writers (Wellington: Victoria University Press)
- 1991: Soho Square. Four (Wellington: Bridget Williams Books)
- 1993: 100 New Zealand Poems (Auckland: Godwit)
- 1995: Denis Glover: Selected Poems (Wellington: Victoria University Press)
- 1996: 1396, a Literary Calendar : 13 works, hand-set & hand-printed (Wellington: Wai-te-ata Press)
- 1997: Mutes & Earthquakes: Bill Manhire's Creative Writing Course at Victoria (Wellington: Victoria University Press)
- 1997: The New Zealand Short Story Collection (with Marion McLeod, Australian edition of Some Other Country) (St. Lucia, Australia: University of Queensland Press)
- 2001: Southern Convergence: Antarctic art (Wellington: Pemmican Press)
- 2001: Spectacular Babies: new writing (Co-edited with Karen Anderson) (Auckland: Flamingo)
- 2004: The Wide White Page: Writers Imagine Antarctica (Wellington: Victoria University Press)
- 2005: 121 New Zealand Poems (Auckland: Godwit)
- 2006: Janet Frame: The Goose Bath – Poems (with Pamela Gordon and Denis Harold) (Auckland: Vintage)
- 2006: Are Angels OK? The Parallel Universes of New Zealand Writers and Scientists (with Paul Callaghan) (Wellington: Victoria University Press)
- 2007: Still Shines When You Think of It: A Festschrift for Vincent O'Sullivan (with Peter Whiteford) (Wellington: Victoria University Press)
- 2008: Some Other Country: New Zealand's Best Short Stories (with Marion McLeod, 4th edition) (Wellington: Victoria University Press)
- 2008: Storms Will Tell: Janet Frame’s Selected Poems (with Pamela Gordon and Denis Harold) (Northumberland: Bloodaxe Books)
- 2011: The Best of Best New Zealand Poems (with Damien Wilkins) (Wellington: Victoria University Press)
- 2012: Ein anderes Land: Short Storys aus Neuseeland (German edition of Some Other Country, re-edited, translated by Saskia Bontjes van Beek) (Munich: Dt. Taschenbuch-Verlag)
- 2019 Contributor to The New Divan: A Lyrical Dialogue Between East and West ISBN 9781909942288

=== Other works ===
- 1975: Song Cycle (performance, with Jack Body, John Casserly and others) (Wellington: Sound-Movement Theatre)
- 1978: Riddles for voice and piano (with Gillian Whitehead) (London: Photographic Service (Music Reproductions))
- 1983: Locating the Beloved and Other Stories (Wellington: Single Title Press)
- 1986: Maurice Gee (biography) (Auckland: Oxford University Press)
- 1988: The Brain of Katherine Mansfield (choose-your-own-adventure book) (Auckland: Auckland University Press)
- 1990: The New Land: a Picture Book (collection of short stories) (Auckland: Heinemann Reed)
- 1994: South Pacific (collection of short stories) (Manchester: Carcanet Press)
- 1996: Songs of My Life (collection of short stories) (Auckland: Godwit)
- 1998: Homelight: an Antarctic Miscellany (collaborative work with Chris Orsman and Nigel Brown) (Karori: Pemmican Press)
- 2000: Doubtful Sounds: essays and interviews (Wellington: Victoria University Press)
- 2003: Under the Influence (memoir) (Wellington: Four Winds Press)
- 2010: Buddhist Rain (album with music by Norman Meehan and Hannah Griffin) (Wellington: Rattle Records)
- 2011: Making Baby Float (album with music by Norman Meehan and Hannah Griffin) (Wellington: Rattle Records)
- 2012: These Rough Notes (book and album, with Anne Noble, Norman Meehan and Hannah Griffin) (Wellington: Victoria University Press)
- 2016: The Stories of Bill Manhire (collection of short stories) (Wellington: Victoria University Press)
- 2017: Tell Me My Name (riddles set to music by Norman Meehan and sung by Hannah Griffin) (Wellington: Victoria University Press)
- 2021: Bifröst (album with music by Norman Meehan, Hannah Griffin, Andrew Laking, Blair Latham, Lance Philip, Neil Aldridge, and Michael Sutherland) (Wellington: Rattle Records)

== See also ==
- New Zealand literature

Cultural offices
First Laureate	New Zealand Poet Laureate; 1997–1999	Succeeded by Hone Tuwhare
