= Prime Minister's Awards for Literary Achievement =

New Zealand literary award

- Reward: $60,000 in each category
- First award: 2003
- Latest award: 2025

Prime Minister's Awards for Literary Achievement is a New Zealand literary award established in 2003 by the Arts Council of New Zealand Toi Aotearoa (Creative New Zealand), the national arts development agency of the New Zealand government. Each winner in three categories of fiction, nonfiction and poetry receives a monetary award of NZ$60,000.

== Winners ==
2025

- Fiction: Barbara Else
- Non-fiction: Ross Calman
- Poetry: Dinah Hawken

2024

- Fiction: Lynley Dodd
- Non-fiction: Neville Peat
- Poetry: Apirana Taylor

2023

- Fiction: Lee Murray
- Non-fiction: Linda Tuhiwai Smith
- Poetry: Tusiata Avia

2022

- Fiction: Stephanie Johnson
- Nonfiction: Vincent O'Malley
- Poetry: James Norcliffe

2021

- Fiction: David Hill
- Nonfiction: Claudia Orange
- Poetry: Anne Kennedy

2020

- Fiction: Tessa Duder
- Nonfiction: Tīmoti Kāretu
- Poetry: Jenny Bornholdt

2019

- Fiction: Elizabeth Knox
- Nonfiction: Gavin Bishop
- Poetry: Fleur Adcock

2018

- Fiction: Renée
- Nonfiction: Wystan Curnow
- Poetry: Michael Harlow

2017

- Fiction: Witi Ihimaera
- Nonfiction: Peter Simpson
- Poetry: Paula Green

2016

- Fiction: Marilyn Duckworth
- Nonfiction: Atholl Anderson
- Poetry: David Eggleton

2015

- Fiction: Roger Hall
- Nonfiction: Dame Joan Metge
- Poetry: Bernadette Hall

2014

- Fiction: Jack Lasenby
- Nonfiction: Jock Phillips
- Poetry: Ian Wedde

2013

- Fiction: Owen Marshall
- Nonfiction: Martin Edmond
- Poetry: Michele Leggott

2012

- Fiction: Albert Wendt
- Nonfiction: Gregory O'Brien
- Poetry: Sam Hunt

2011

- Fiction: Dame Fiona Kidman
- Nonfiction: James Belich
- Poetry: Peter Bland

2010

- Fiction: Joy Cowley
- Nonfiction: James McNeish
- Poetry: Cilla McQueen

2009

- Fiction: C. K. Stead
- Nonfiction: Ranginui Walker
- Poetry: Brian Turner

2008

- Fiction: Lloyd Jones
- Nonfiction: W. H. Oliver
- Poetry: Elizabeth Smither

2007

- Fiction: Fiona Farrell
- Nonfiction: Dick Scott
- Poetry: Bill Manhire

2006

- Fiction: Patricia Grace
- Nonfiction: Judith Binney
- Poetry: Vincent O'Sullivan

2005

- Fiction: Margaret Mahy
- Nonfiction: Philip Temple
- Poetry: Alistair Te Ariki Campbell

2004

- Fiction: Maurice Gee
- Nonfiction: Anne Salmond
- Poetry: Kevin Ireland

2003

- Fiction: Janet Frame
- Nonfiction: Michael King
- Poetry: Hone Tuwhare
