= James Norcliffe =

New Zealand writer

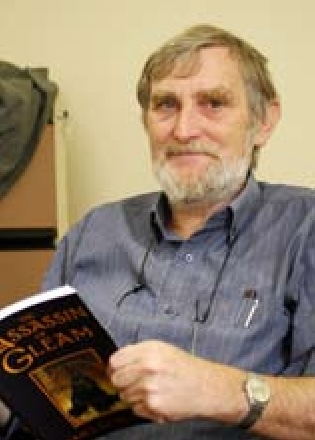
- Norcliffe in 2008
- Born: James Samuel Norcliffe; 3 March 1946 (age 80); Greymouth, New Zealand
- Occupation: Writer
- Website: jamesnorcliffe.com

James Samuel Norcliffe (born 3 March 1946) is a New Zealand novelist, short story writer, poet, editor, teacher and educator. His work has been widely published and he has been the recipient of a number of writing residencies. Several of his books have been shortlisted for or won awards, including The Loblolly Boy which won the New Zealand Post Junior Fiction Award in 2010. He lives at Church Bay, Lyttelton Harbour, New Zealand.

== Biography ==
James Norcliffe was born on 3 March 1946 in Greymouth. Some of his favourite books as a child were classics such as Coral Island, Treasure Island, The Heroes, Swiss Family Robinson, Alice in Wonderland and Wind in the Willows, Elleston Trevor's The Island of the Pines, and the Just William books and Bunter.

He is a teacher, writer and editor and has published several collections of poetry and a number of novels for children and young adults. His work has been published widely in journals both in New Zealand (including Landfall, Islands and Sport) and overseas, and his short stories for children have been widely anthologised. He has been poetry and short story editor of takahē magazine and poetry editor of the Christchurch Press, and has worked closely with the Christchurch School for Young Writers, including editing the annual Re-Draft anthologies. With Joanna Preston, he collected earthquake poems written in the weeks and months after the 2010 Canterbury Earthquake and subsequent earthquakes, and edited Leaving the Red Zone, an anthology of 148 poems by 87 poets from across New Zealand. With Elizabeth Smither, he was judge of the 2016 Flash Fiction Day competition.

He has appeared at a number of festivals and other book events including the Queensland Poetry Festival (2008), the International Poetry Festival in Medellin, Colombia, (2010), the Trois Rivieres International Poetry Festival in Quebec (2011) and the WORD Christchurch Festival (2018).

James Norcliffe has lived in or near Christchurch for much of his life, apart from spells in China (in the 1980s) and Brunei Darussalam (in the 1990s). He is married with two children and lives with his wife at Church Bay, Lyttelton Harbour.

== Awards and prizes ==
Several of Norcliffe's books have been shortlisted for awards or named as Storylines Notable Books. The Assassin of Gleam won the Sir Julius Vogel Award for the best New Zealand fantasy novel of 2006, and was shortlisted for the 2007 LIANZA Esther Glen Medal. The Loblolly Boy won the 2010 NZ Post Junior Fiction Award and was shortlisted for the Esther Glen Medal and the Sir Julius Vogel Science Fiction Award.

Norcliffe won the Lilian Ida Smith Award in 1990 and the New Zealand Poetry Society's international competition in 1992. In 2003, he and Bernadette Hall received the inaugural Christchurch Press Literary Liaisons Honour Award for 'lasting contribution to literature in the South Island'.

Norcliffe was awarded the Robert Burns Fellowship at the University of Otago in 2000. In 2006, he took up the Creative New Zealand Iowa University Fellowship and also took part in the Tasmanian Writers' Island of Residencies programme. He was Visiting Artist at Massey University in 2008 and he was the recipient of the 2012 University of Otago College of Education / Creative New Zealand Children's Writer in Residence. During this residency, he wrote his children's novel Felix and the Red Rats. He was the Creative New Zealand Randell Cottage Writing Fellow in 2018.

In 2022 he received the Prime Minister's Award for Literary Achievement in Poetry, while in 2023 he won the Margaret Mahy Medal. Norcliffe was announced as the New Zealand Society of Authors' President of Honour for 2027.

== Publications ==
=== As author ===
- Kitch A play written while teaching at Shirley Boy's High. (Unpublished, 1973)
- Under the Rotunda (Hazard Press, 1992)
- Penguin Bay (Hazard Press, 1993)
- The Emerald Encyclopedia (Hazard Press, 1994)
- The Carousel Experiment (Hazard Press, 1995)
- The Fun House Mirror with Alan Bunn and Marissa Johnpillai (Clerestory Press, 2003)
- The Assassin of Gleam (Hazard Press, 2005)
- The Loblolly Boy (Longacre Press, 2009)
- The Loblolly Boy and the Sorcerer (Longacre Press/Random House, 2011)
- The Enchanted Flute (Longacre Press/Random House, 2012)
- Packing a Bag for Mars (Clerestory Press, 2012)
- Shadow Play (Proverse Hong Kong, 2012. A Proverse Prize Publication. Pbk with an audio CD of all poems in the collection)
- Felix and the Red Rats (Longacre / Random House, 2013)
- The Pirates and the Night Maker (Longacre Press / Random House, 2015)
- Dark Days in the Oxygen Café (Victoria University Press, 2016)
- Twice Upon A Time (Puffin, 2017)

=== As editor ===
- Re-Draft 2 (with Alan Bunn) (Clerestory Press/School for Young Writers, 2002)
- Re-Draft 3 (with Alan Bunn) (Clerestory Press/School for Young Writers, 2003)
- Re-Draft 4 (with Alan Bunn) (Clerestory Press/School for Young Writers, 2004)
- Cupid on a Friday Night: Re-Draft 5 (with Alan Bunn) (Clerestory Press/School for Young Writers, 2005)
- Tennis with Raw Eggs: Re-Draft 6 (with Alan Bunn) (Clerestory Press/School for Young Writers, 2006)
- The Polar Bear Ward: Re-Draft 7 (with Tessa Duder) (Clerestory Press/School for Young Writers, 2007)
- D.I.Y Graffiti: Re-Draft 8 (with Tessa Duder) (Clerestory Press/School for Young Writers, 2008)
- Fishing for Birds: Re-Draft 9 (with Tessa Duder) (Clerestory Press/ School for Young Writers, 2009)
- The Steepest Street in the World: Re-Draft 10 (with Tessa Duder) (Clerestory Press/School For Young Writers, 2010)
- The Temptation of Sunlight: Redraft 11 (with Tessa Duder) (Clerestory Press, 2011)
- Walking a Tightrope in Bare Feet: Redraft 12 (with Tessa Duder) (Clerestory Press, 2012)
- Mad Honey: Redraft 13 (with Tessa Duder) (Clerestory Press, 2013)
- Essential New Zealand Poems: Facing the Empty Page (with Harry Ricketts and Siobhan Harvey) (Random House / Godwit, 2014)
- The Word is Out: Redraft 14 (with Tessa Duder) (Clerestory Press, 2014)
- They Call Me Ink: Redraft 15 (with Tessa Duder) (Clerestory Press, 2015)
- Leaving the Red Zone: poems from the Canterbury Earthquakes (with Joanna Preston) (Clerestory Press, 2016)
- Bonsai: Best small stories from Aotearoa New Zealand' (with Michelle Elvy and Frankie McMillan) (Canterbury University Press, 2018)
