= David Eggleton =

New Zealand poet and writer

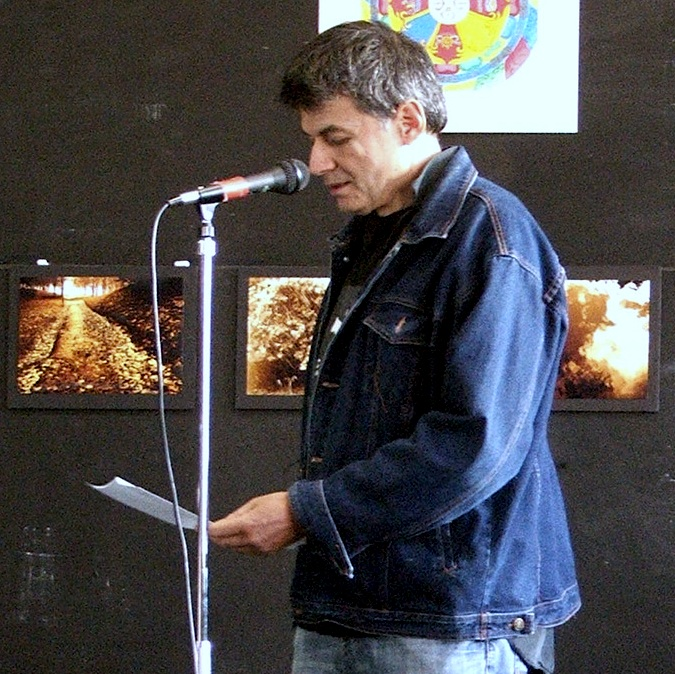
- Eggleton, pictured reading some of his verse in Dunedin, 2011
- Born: 1952 (age 73–74); Auckland, New Zealand
- Writing career
- Genre: Poetry
- Notable awards: Prime Minister's Award for Literary Achievement (2016); Ockham New Zealand Book Award for poetry (2016); New Zealand Poet Laureate (2019–2022)

David Eggleton (born 1952) is a New Zealand poet, critic and writer. Eggleton has been awarded the Ockham New Zealand Book Award for poetry and in 2019 was appointed New Zealand Poet Laureate, a title he held until 2022. Eggleton's work has appeared in a multitude of publications in New Zealand and he has released over 18 poetry books (1986–2001) with a variety of publishers, including Penguin.

== Early life ==
Born in Auckland and of mixed European, Tongan, and Rotuman descent, Eggleton spent part his formative years in both Fiji and Auckland, dropping out of school to take up performance music and poetry. Eggleton later moved to Dunedin, where he has been based since the 1980s.

== Literary career ==
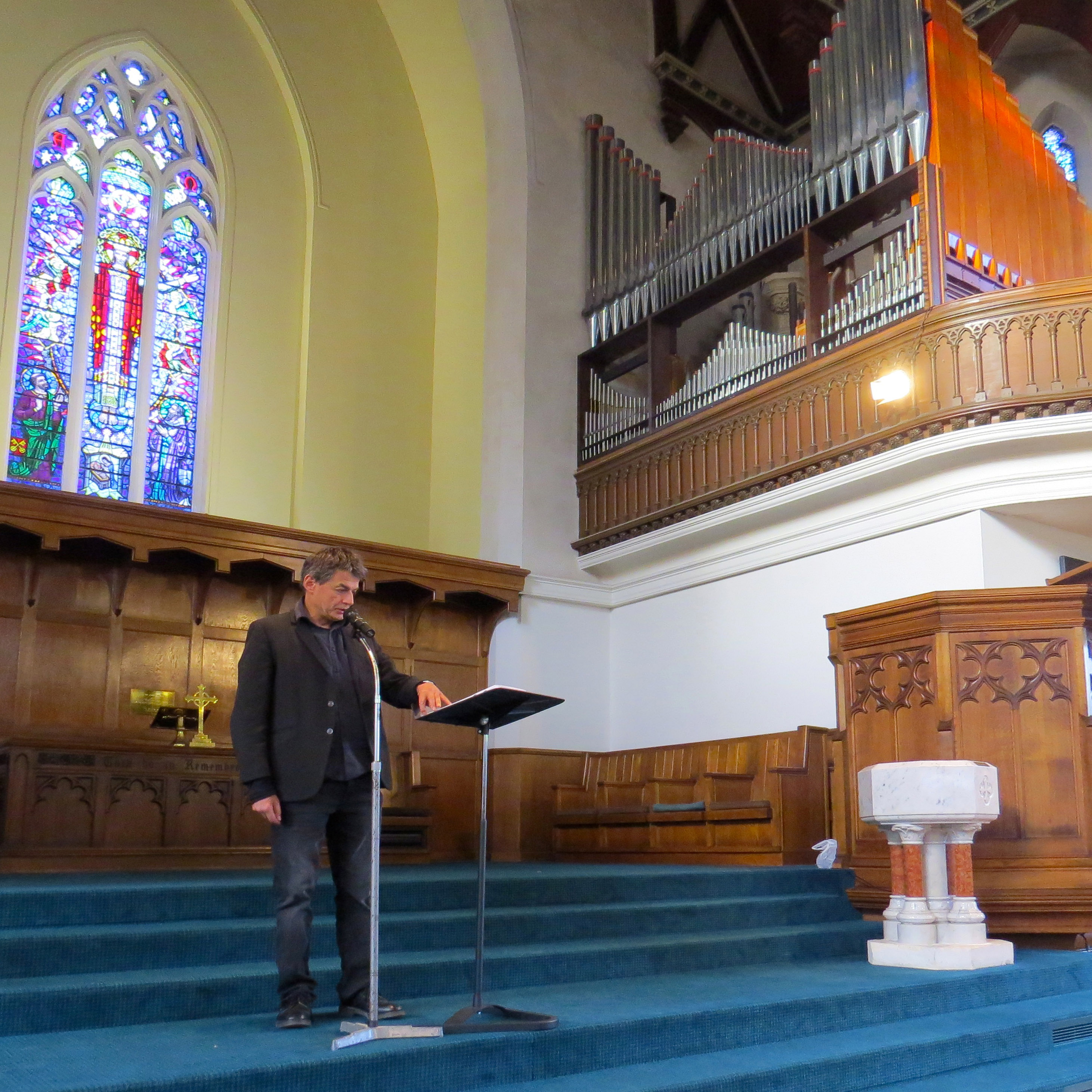
In recital at Knox Church, Dunedin, March 2016

Eggleton's creative output has been diverse, including mixed media recordings involving poetry and music, several volumes of poetry, histories of New Zealand music and photography, and a large number of literary reviews. He is also an established art critic, writing regularly for Art New Zealand, which is New Zealand's major visual arts journal. He was the editor of New Zealand's premier literary journal, Landfall, from 2010 to 2017. He is a six-time Montana New Zealand Reviewer of the Year. Other awards have included a Robert Burns Fellowship from the University of Otago in 1990, London Time Out's Street Poet of the Year (1985), the 2015 Janet Frame Literary Trust Award for Poetry, and in 2016 the Prime Minister's Award for Literary Achievement (in poetry). His collection of poems, The Conch Trumpet (Otago University Press, 2015), won the 2016 Ockham New Zealand Book Award for poetry. In 2017 he received the Fulbright-Creative New Zealand Pacific Writers' Residency. Eggleton has also been a part of the Dunedin Writers & Readers Festival in 2017, 2019 and 2021. A video, For Art's Sake: Art and Politics. Performance Poet David Eggleton, won the TV Arts Documentary prize in the 1997 Qantas Media Awards.

In 2022 Eggleton was a guest at the Auckland Writers Festival.

Ian Wedde (in the Penguin Book of New Zealand Verse) describes Eggleton's poem Painting Mount Taranaki as "...inside its history. Its language is a confident if erratic blend of vernacular, lyric, and high demotic; this confidence allows for mobile and ironic cross-currents animating the texture and depth of the language throughout." Eggleton's poems are frequently iconoclastic or anti-establishment, using mockery to point out the shortcomings of political and social systems, and when read are delivered at a fast, fluent tempo.

== Recordings and publications ==
=== Recordings ===
- Versifier (2002) Yellow Eye Music
- Baxter: Poems by James K. Baxter (2000) National Radio Music
- Seeing Voices: New Zealand Poets Reading (1999) Auckland University Press
- Poetry Demon (1993) Jayrem Records
- Wrap Up (1987) Partisan Productions

=== Video ===
- The Cloud Forest (2002) (short film; Eggleton co-editor)
- Teleprompter (2001) (short film; Eggleton co-editor)

=== Books ===
- Respirator: A Poet Laureate Collection 2019-2022 (2023) (poetry)
- Leaps and Bounds – ESAW (2021) (poetry chapbook)
- Throw Net: Upena Ho'olei – Fernbank Studio Te Whanganui-a-Tara (2021) (poetry chapbook)
- The Wilder Years: Selected Poems – Otago University Press (2021) (poetry)
- Edgeland and Other Poems – Otago University Press (2018) (poetry)
- SNAP - Otakou Press (2017) – (poetry chapbook)
- The Conch Trumpet – Otago University Press (2015) (poetry)
- Time of the Icebergs – Otago University Press (2010) (poetry)
- Towards Aotearoa: A Short History of Twentieth Century New Zealand Art – Reed (2007)
- Into the Light: A History of New Zealand Photography – Craig Potton (2006)
- Fast Talker – Auckland University Press (2006) (poetry)
- Ready to Fly: The Story of New Zealand Rock Music – Craig Potton (2003)
- Seasons: Four Essays on the New Zealand Year – Craig Potton (2001)
- Rhyming Planet – Steele Roberts (2001) (poetry)
- Here on Earth – Craig Potton (1999) (an anthology of New Zealand landscape writing; Eggleton editor)
- Empty Orchestra – Auckland University Press (1995) (poetry)
- People of the Land – Penguin (1988) (poetry)
- After Tokyo – ESAW (1987) (short fiction)
- South Pacific Sunrise – Penguin (1986) (poetry)
- Various authors (2023). Jarquín, Carlos Javier (ed.). Canto planetario: hermandad en la Tierra. Costa Rica: HC Editores. ISBN 979-8850092115.

Cultural offices
Preceded by Selina Tusitala Marsh	New Zealand Poet Laureate; 2019–2022	Succeeded by Chris Tse
