= C. K. Stead =

New Zealand writer (born 1932)

C. K. Stead ONZ CBE
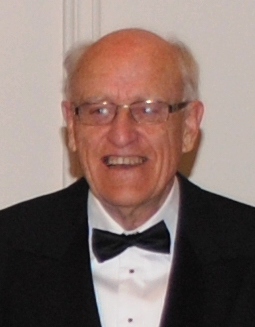
- Stead in 2011

10th New Zealand Poet Laureate
- In office 2015–2017
- Preceded by: Vincent O'Sullivan
- Succeeded by: Selina Tusitala Marsh

Personal details
- Born: Christian Karlson Stead; 17 October 1932 (age 94) Auckland, New Zealand
- Spouse: Kay Stead
- Children: 3, including Charlotte Grimshaw
- Education: Mount Albert Grammar School
- Known for: Novelist, poet, literary critic

Academic background
- Education: University of Auckland (BA, 1954; MA, 1955); University of Bristol (PhD, 1961)

Academic work
- Institutions: University of Auckland
- Doctoral students: Roger Horrocks

Christian Karlson "Karl" Stead ONZ CBE (born 17 October 1932) is a New Zealand writer whose works include novels, poetry, short stories, and literary criticism. He is one of New Zealand's most well-known and internationally celebrated writers.

== Early life and education ==
Stead was born in Auckland, New Zealand, in 1932. He attended Mount Albert Grammar School. He has said that growing up he rarely read New Zealand writers: "I read a few New Zealand writers at school but mainly it was a British education so one read British writers really". Stead began writing poetry at about age 14 when he read a copy of the collected works of Rupert Brooke, sent by his sister's penpal in England.

Stead graduated from the University of Auckland with a Bachelor of Arts in 1954, and earned his Masters of Arts the following year. At this time he and his wife were neighbours with short-story writer Frank Sargeson. Writer Janet Frame was living in a hut in Sargeson's garden, having recently been discharged after nine years in a mental hospital. Frame later wrote about this time in her memoir An Angel at My Table, and Stead covered the same period in his autobiographical novel All Visitors Ashore (1984).

== Academic and literary career ==
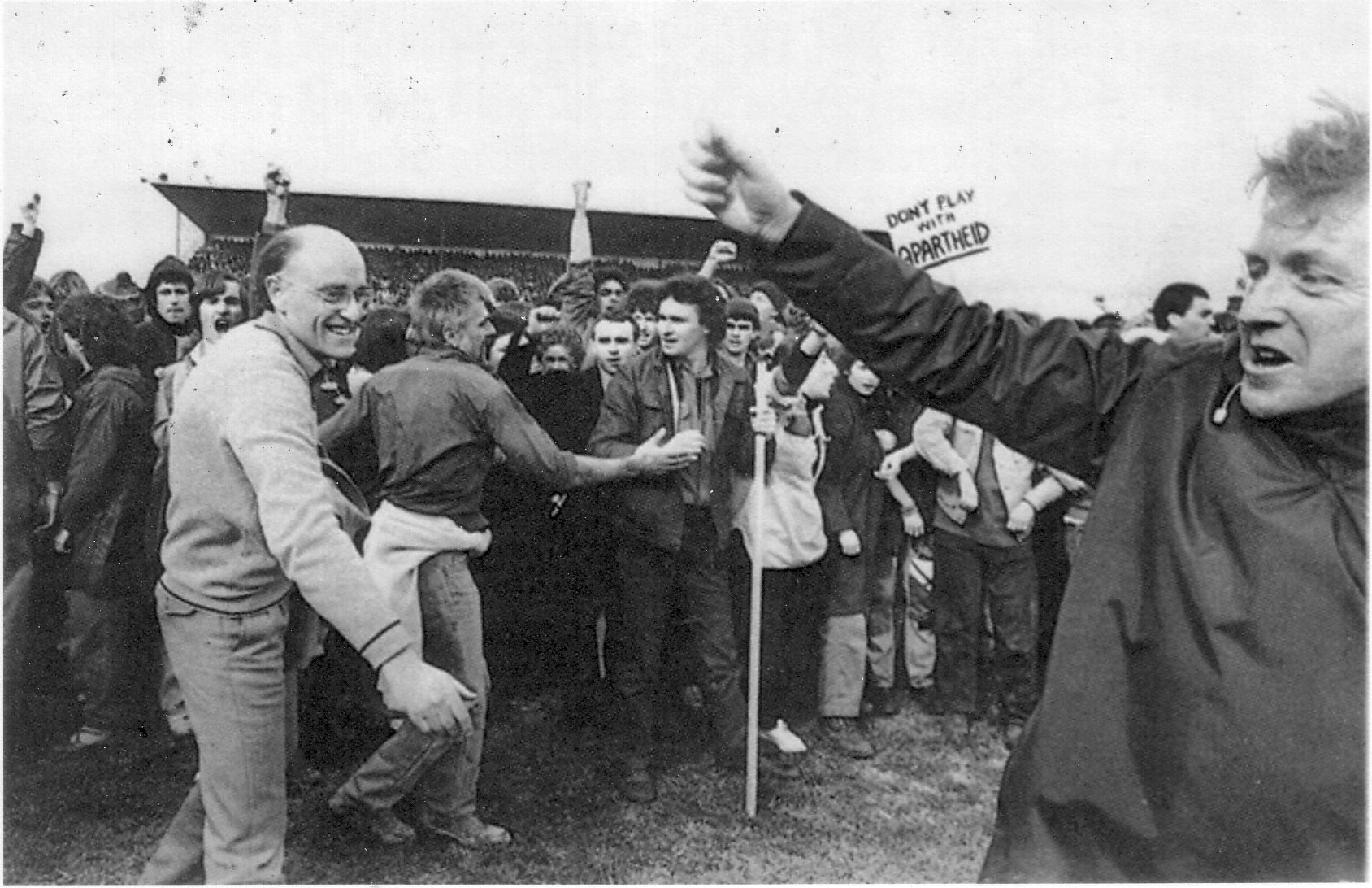
Stead (left) at the 1981 protest against Springboks in Hamilton

Stead completed his PhD at the University of Bristol in 1961. From 1959 to 1986, Stead taught at the University of Auckland, becoming the Professor of English in 1968. In 1964, Stead published his first book, The New Poetic (1964), based on his PhD study of W. B. Yeats, Ezra Pound, T.S. Eliot and the Georgian poets. It went on to sell over 100,000 copies. His first book of poems, Whether the Will Is Free: Poems 1954–62, was published in the same year.

Stead's first novel, Smith's Dream, about a war similar to the Vietnam War in New Zealand, was published in 1971. Stead was an opponent of the Vietnam War. Smith's Dream provided the basis for the film Sleeping Dogs, starring Sam Neill, which became the first New Zealand film released in the United States.

In the 1980s, Stead's writings about Māori rights and feminism became the subject of some criticism. For example, in an article published in the London Review of Books in December 1986, he wrote that the representation of New Zealand history by Witi Ihimaera in his novel The Matriarch (1986) was inaccurate "insofar as it ascribes conscious and malicious intent to the Pakeha and unwillingness to the Maori", and was highly critical of the novel. In consequence his editorship of the Faber Book of Contemporary South Pacific Stories was boycotted by some writers, including Keri Hulme, although Stead denied accusations of racism or being anti-Māori. Stead was active in protests against the 1981 protest against Springboks and was part of the crowd that occupied the field at a game in Hamilton causing its cancellation.

Stead retired from his position as the Professor of English at the University of Auckland in 1986 to write full time, after the success of his novel All Visitors Ashore (1984). In the following two decades he wrote a string of internationally successful novels, and twice won the fiction section of the New Zealand Book Awards with All Visitors Ashore and The Singing Whakapapa (1994). Stead's historical novel Mansfield: A Novel, based on the life of the writer Katherine Mansfield, was a finalist for the 2005 Tasmania Pacific Fiction Prize and received commendation in the 2005 Commonwealth Writers Prize for the South East Asia and South Pacific region.

Stead has continued to write and receive international accolades well into his seventies and eighties. In 2010 he won the inaugural Sunday Times EFG Private Bank Short Story Award for his short story "Last Season's Man". The short story was subject to some controversy, with literary commentator Fergus Barrowman suggesting that it appeared to be a "revenge fantasy" about Stead's rivalry with younger writer Nigel Cox, who had criticised Stead in a 1994 essay. The story was reported on by UK satirical magazine Private Eye. Stead in response has said that the story was a work of fiction.

Stead was appointed a Commander of the Order of the British Empire, for services to New Zealand literature, in the 1985 New Year Honours, and was admitted into the highest civilian honour New Zealand can bestow, the Order of New Zealand in the 2007 Special Honours.

In August 2015, Stead was named the New Zealand Poet Laureate for 2015 to 2017. To celebrate the conclusion of Stead's term as Poet Laureate, the Alexander Turnbull Library published a signed, limited edition book of his work called In the Mirror, and Dancing. The little volume of poems was hand-pressed by Brendan O'Brien and illustrated with line sketches by New Zealand expatriate artist Douglas MacDiarmid. The book was launched on 8 August 2017 in Wellington, with the assistance of Gregory O'Brien.

Stead's memoirs are published in three volumes: South-West of Eden: A Memoir, 1932–1956 (2010), You Have a Lot To Lose: A Memoir, 1956-1986 (2020) and What You Made of It: A memoir, 1987–2020 (2021).

== Personal life ==
Stead was married to his wife Kay for nearly 70 years; she died in 2023. They had three children together, including Charlotte Grimshaw (writer) and Oliver Stead (curator at the Alexander Turnbull Library). Oliver Stead died in 2024.

== List of awards and honours ==
- 1955 Poetry Awards Incorporated prize (U.S.A.)
- 1960 Landfall Readers' Award
- 1972 Katherine Mansfield Short Story award
- 1972 Katherine Mansfield Menton Fellowship
- 1984 Commander of the Order of the British Empire for services to New Zealand literature
- 1990 Queen's Medal
- 1995 Fellow of the Royal Society of Literature
- 2005 Creative New Zealand Michael King Fellowship
- 2001 Honorary DLitt from the University of Bristol
- 2007 Member of the Order of New Zealand
- 2009 Montana Prize (for Collected Poems 1951–2006)
- 2009 Prime Minister's Awards for Literary Achievement
- 2010 Sunday Times Short Story Award (UK) (for "Last Season's Man")
- 2011 Prime Minister's Award for Literary Achievement
- 2014 Sarah Broom Poetry Prize

=== New Zealand Book Awards ===
- 1976 Quesada (Poetry)
- 1985 All Visitors Ashore (Fiction, shared with Marilyn Duckworth)
- 1995 The Singing Whakapapa (Fiction)

== Selected works ==
=== Poetry ===
- Whether the Will is Free (1964)
- Crossing the Bar (1972)
- Quesada (1975)
- Walking Westward (1979)
- Geographies (1982)
- Poems of a Decade (1983)
- Paris: A poem (1984)
- Between (1988)
- Voices (1990)
- Straw into Gold: New and selected poems (1997)
- The Right Thing (2000)
- Dog (2002)
- The Black River (2007)
- Ischaemia (winning poem of the 2010 International Hippocrates Prize for Poetry and Medicine)
- In the Mirror, and Dancing (2017)

=== Essays and academic work ===
- The New Poetic (1964)
- Measure for Measure (editor, 1977)
- In the Glass Case: Essays on New Zealand literature (1982)
- Pound, Yeats, Eliot and the Modernist Movement (1986)
- Answering to the Language: Essays on modern writers (1989)
- The Writer at Work: Essays (2000)
- Kin of Place: Essays on 20 New Zealand writers (2002)
- Book Self: Essays (2008)

=== Novels ===
- Smith's Dream (1971)
- All Visitors Ashore (1984)
- The Death of the Body (1986)
- Sister Hollywood (1989)
- The End of the Century at the End of the World (1992)
- The Singing Whakapapa (1994)
- Villa Vittoria (1997)
- Talking About O'Dwyer (1999)
- The Secret History of Modernism (2001)
- Mansfield: a novel (2004)
- My Name Was Judas (2006)
- Risk (2012)
- The Necessary Angel (2018)

=== Other works ===
- Five for the Symbol (short story collection, 1981)
- The Blind Blonde with Candles in Her Hair (short story collection, 1998)
- South-West of Eden: A Memoir, 1932–1956 (2009)
- You Have A Lot to Lose: A Memoir 1956–1986 (2020)
- What You Made of It: A Memoir 1987–2010 (2021)
- Table Talk: Opinions, stories, and a play (2024) (the play is a 20th-century version in English of Andromache by Jean Racine)

== See also ==
- New Zealand literature

Cultural offices
Preceded by Vincent O'Sullivan	New Zealand Poet Laureate; 2015–2017	Succeeded by Selina Tusitala Marsh
