= Joanna Preston =

New Zealand poet and editor (born 1972)

- Born: 1972 (age 53–54); Sydney, Australia
- Citizenship: Australian and New Zealand
- Education: University of Glamorgan (MPhil)
- Occupations: Poet; editor; creative writing tutor
- Writing career
- Notable works: The Summer King (2008); Tumble (2021)
- Notable awards: Mary and Peter Biggs Award for Poetry (2022)
- Website: joannapreston.com

Joanna Preston (born 1972) is an Australian poet, editor and creative writing tutor based in New Zealand. She has published two award-winning collections of poetry.

== Life and career ==
Preston was born in Sydney in 1972, and grew up in rural New South Wales. She moved to Christchurch, New Zealand, in 1994. In 2001 she won first place in an international haiku competition judged by Jim Kacian. From 2003 to 2006 she lived in England, where she obtained a MPhil in creative writing from the University of Glamorgan.

Her first collection of poems, The Summer King, was published in 2008. It won the inaugural Kathleen Grattan Award for the best original collection of poetry by a New Zealand or Pacific resident or citizen, and the Mary Gilmore Award for the best first collection by an Australian poet. The poems in the collection were mainly produced during her studies at the University of Glamorgan, and its publication by Otago University Press was part of the Kathleen Grattan Award. The Waikato Times described it as a "dazzling debut", with her poems "beautifully worked, insightful, emotionally gentle yet unsettling".

She was the editor of takahē magazine from 2014 to 2016. Together with James Norcliffe, she was the editor of an anthology of earthquake poems written shortly after the 2010 Canterbury earthquake and subsequent earthquakes, titled Leaving the Red Zone and published in 2016. She has said that the experience of the Canterbury earthquakes led to her and her students writing many poems. She has also edited a number of anthologies for the New Zealand Poetry Society.

Her second collection of poems, Tumble, won the Mary and Peter Biggs Award for Poetry at the 2022 Ockham New Zealand Book Awards. Judge Saradha Koirala said of Preston's work: "Simply written, yet dramatic and powerfully eloquent, each poem in this book is a banger." Reviewer Chris Tse had predicted it would win the top prize in advance of the ceremony, describing it as "a wide-ranging collection that traces the paths we take in life, and reflects on the experiences and wisdom we gain from our travels".

== Selected works ==
=== Poetry collections ===
- The Summer King (Otago University Press, 2008)
- Tumble (Otago University Press, 2021)

=== As editor ===
- Listening to the Rain: an anthology of Christchurch haiku and haibun (with Cyril Childs) (Small White Teapot Haiku Group, 2002)
- A Savage Gathering (New Zealand Poetry Society, 2002)
- The Infinity We Swim In (New Zealand Poetry Society, 2007)
- Before the Sirocco (New Zealand Poetry Society, 2008)
- Leaving the Red Zone: poems from the Canterbury earthquakes (with James Norcliffe) (Clerestory Press, 2016)
- Broken Lines: In Charcoal (with Karen Zelas) (Pūkeko Publications, 2020)
