= Anne Kennedy =

New Zealand writer

Anne Kennedy (born 1959 Wellington, New Zealand) is a New Zealand novelist, poet, and filmwriter.

== Background ==
Educated in Wellington, Kennedy was a piano teacher and music librarian in her early years. She graduated with a Bachelor of Music in Composition from Victoria University of Wellington and taught at Trinity College London. In 2007 she completed a Master of Arts at Victoria University of Wellington, under the supervision of Lydia Wevers, titled Kicking round home: Atonality in the Bone People.

== Career ==
Since 1986, she has been a freelance scriptwriter. Anne Kennedy published her first novel in 1988, and has since published six novels and books of poetry. Her most recent novel, The Last Days of the National Costume, was featured on the Listener's Top 100 Books of 2013, and on the Nielson 2013 Bestseller's list in New Zealand adult fiction.

In 2006, Kennedy was a visiting writer at University of Hawaiʻi at Mānoa. She was a professor there for several years. Currently, she teaches creative writing at Manukau Institute of Technology. She was co-editor of literary journal Ika, and was co-editor of the online literary journal Trout and co-edited the 2005 Best New Zealand Poems series.

Her work has appeared in Landfall, Sport, NZ Listener, Southerly (Australia), and JAAM, and she has co-edited several other works including the 2005 Best New Zealand Poems series.

In 2021 she received the Prime Minister's Award for Literary Achievement in Poetry.

== Awards ==
- 1985 Bank of New Zealand Katherine Mansfield Short Story Award
- 1995 University of Auckland Literary Fellow
- 2004 Montana New Zealand Book Award for Poetry
- 2013 New Zealand Post Book Awards - Poetry category winner
- 2014 Fellowship for University of Auckland Residency at the Michael King Writers Centre
- 2014 Nigel Cox Unity Books Award
- 2021 Prime Minister's Award for Literary Achievement

== Works ==
=== Poetry ===
- The Sea Walks into a Wall, 2021 ISBN 9781869409586
- Moth Hour, Auckland University Press, 2019 ISBN 9781869408947
- "What Fell"; "Towards Fourteen Ways of Looking at Pohutukawa"; "Berlin", Poetry New Zealand
- "I am", Scottish Poetry Library
- Sing song. Auckland University Press. 2003. ISBN 978-1-86940-295-2.
- The Time of the Giants. Auckland University Press. 28 September 2005. ISBN 978-1-86940-342-3.

=== Novels ===
- 100 Traditional Smiles. Victoria University Press. 1988. ISBN 978-0-86473-077-0.
- Musica Ficta. University of Queensland Press. 1993. ISBN 978-0-7022-2457-7.
- A Boy and His Uncle. Picador. 1998. ISBN 978-0-330-36057-9.
- The Last Days of the National Costume. Allen & Unwin. 2013.
- The Ice Shelf. Wellington: Victoria University Press. 2018. ISBN 978-1-77656-201-5.

=== Screenwriting ===
- The Monkey's Mask
- Crush

=== Essay ===
- The Source of the Song (ed. Mark Williams, 1995)

=== Anthologies ===
- The Picador Book of Contemporary New Zealand Fiction. Trans-Atlantic Pub. November 1996. ISBN 978-0-330-33996-4.
- The Oxford Book of New Zealand Short Stories. Oxford University Press, USA. 5 May 1994. ISBN 978-0-19-558291-8. 1st edition 1992
- Bridget Williams, ed. (1 April 2009). Some Other Country: New Zealand's Best Short Stories. Victoria University Press. ISBN 978-0-86473-588-1.
- Susan Davis; Russell Haley, eds. (1989). The Penguin Book of Contemporary New Zealand Short Stories. Penguin Books. ISBN 0-14-011007-0.
- Goodbye to Romance. Allen and Unwin. 1989. ISBN 978-99901-629-3-6.
- Alistair Paterson; Anne Kennedy; James Norcliffe; Stephen Oliver (2004). Poetry New Zealand. Brick Row.
