= Brian Turner (New Zealand poet) =

New Zealand poet (1944–2025)

Brian Turner ONZM
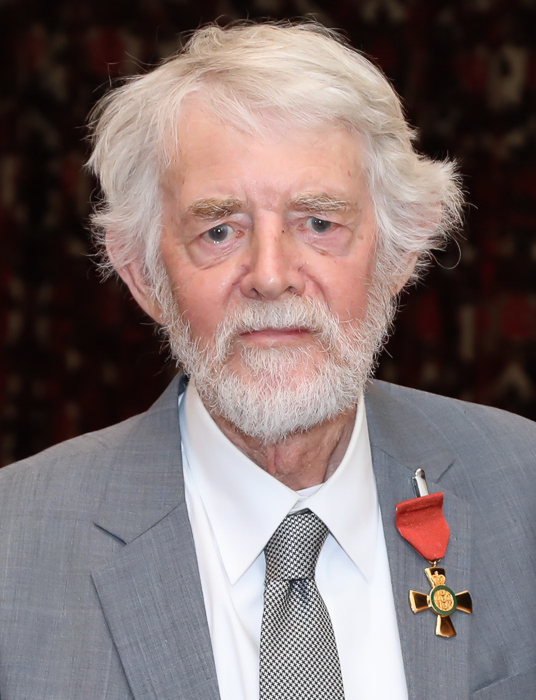
- Turner in 2020

4th New Zealand Poet Laureate
- In office 2003–2005
- Preceded by: Elizabeth Smither
- Succeeded by: Jenny Bornholdt

Personal details
- Born: Brian Lindsay Turner; 4 March 1944 Dunedin, New Zealand
- Died: 5 February 2025 (aged 80) Wānaka, New Zealand
- Relatives: Glenn Turner (brother); Greg Turner (brother); Sukhi Turner (sister-in-law)
- Sports career
- Country: New Zealand
- Sport: Field hockey

Brian Lindsay Turner ONZM (4 March 1944 – 5 February 2025) was a New Zealand poet, author, environmental campaigner and field hockey player. He was New Zealand Poet Laureate between 2003 and 2005.

== Life and career ==
Turner was born in Dunedin on 4 March 1944. He played hockey for New Zealand in the 1960s and was a senior cricketer and veteran road cyclist of note. His mountaineering experience included ascending a number of major peaks including Aoraki / Mount Cook.

In 1978, Turner was one of the founders of the South Island Independence Movement.

His writing included columns and reviews for daily and weekly newspapers, articles, given radio talks, and written scripts for TV programmes. His publications included cricket books with his brother Glenn Turner, the former NZ cricket captain, essays, books on fishing, the high country, and many collections of poetry. His other brother was golfer Greg Turner.

In late 1999, Turner moved to Oturehua, a town of about 40 people in the Maniototo region of Central Otago. He died in Wānaka on 5 February 2025, at the age of 80.

== Awards and recognition ==
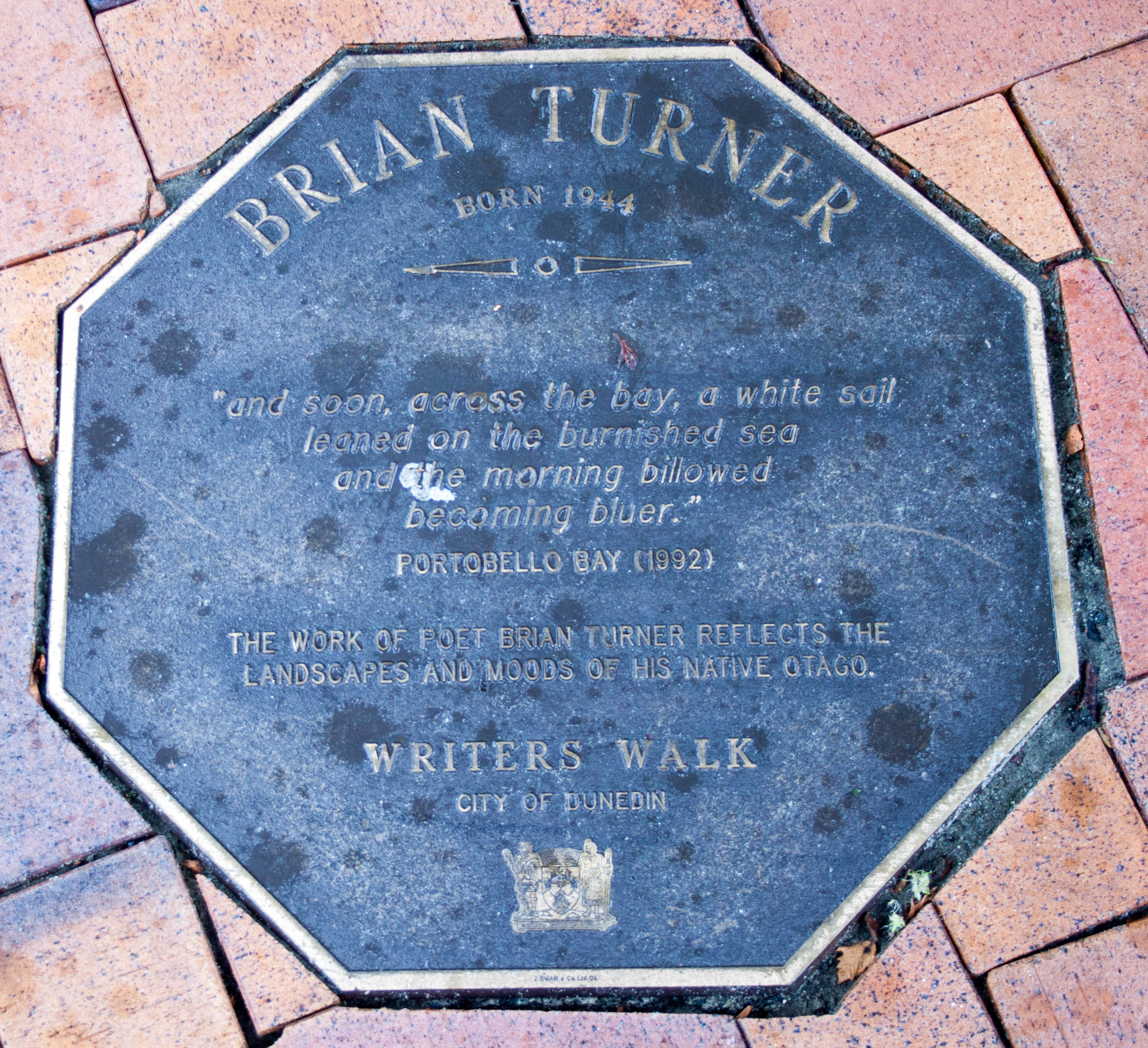
Memorial plaque dedicated to Brian Turner in Dunedin, on the Writers' Walk on the Octagon

- 1979 – Commonwealth Poetry Prize
- 1984 - Robert Burns Fellowship at the University of Otago
- 1985 – J.C. Reid Memorial Prize
- 1993 – Montana New Zealand Book Award for Poetry
- 1997 – appointed Canterbury Writer in Residence
- 2003 – appointed Te Mata Estate New Zealand Poet Laureate for two years
- 2009 – Prime Minister's Award for Literary Achievement in Poetry
- 2010 – Poetry Award for Just This at the New Zealand Post Book Awards
- 2020 – appointed an Officer of the New Zealand Order of Merit, for services to literature and poetry, in the 2020 Queen's Birthday Honours

== Bibliography ==
=== Poetry ===
==== Collections ====
- Ladders of Rain (John McIndoe, 1978)
- Ancestors (John McIndoe, 1981)
- Listening to the River (John McIndoe, 1983)
- Bones (John McIndoe, 1985)
- All That Blue Can Be (John McIndoe, 1989)
- Beyond (John McIndoe, 1992)
- Taking Off (Victoria University Press, 2001)
- Two Otago Poems (Bibliography Room, University of Otago, 2003)
- Faces in the Water (Bibliography Room, University of Otago, 2004)
- Footfall (Random House, 2005)
- Just This (Victoria University Press, 2009)
- Inside Outside (Victoria University Press, 2011)
- Elemental: Central Otago Poems (Godwit/Random House, 2012)
- Poets' Night Out with Vincent O'Sullivan, Jenny Bornholdt and Gregory O'Brien (Fernbank Studio, 2014)
- Night Fishing (Victoria University Press, 2016)
- Selected Poems (Victoria University Press, 2019)
- Selected Poems (Te Herenga Waka University Press, 2025)

==== Anthologies ====
- Timeless Land (Longacre Press, 2001) – includes paintings by Grahame Sydney and writing by Owen Marshall
- The Six Pack - includes Turner's poems (NZ Book Month with Whitireia Publishing, 2006)
- Into the Wider World: A Back Country Miscellany - includes essays and poems (Random House, 2008)
- Boundaries: People and Places of Central Otago (Penguin Random House, 2015) – includes essays, poems and interviews
- Landmarks – includes paintings by Grahame Sydney and writing by Owen Marshall (Godwit, 2020)

==== Sport ====
- Opening Up with Glenn Turner (Hodder and Stoughton, 1987)
- Lifting the Covers with Glenn Turner (Longacre Press, 1998)
- On the Loose with Josh Kronfeld (Longacre Press, 1999)
- Meads (Hodder Moa Beckett, 2002)
- Anton Oliver inside with Anton Oliver (Hodder Moa, 2005)

==== Non-fiction ====
- Images of Coastal Otago - photographs by Michael de Hamel (John McIndoe, 1982)
- New Zealand High Country, Four Seasons with Gordon Roberts (Millwood, 1983)
- The Visitor's Guide to Fiordland New Zealand - photographs by Michael de Hamel (1983)
- The Last River’s Song - photographs of the Clutha and Kawarau by Lloyd Godman (John McIndoe, 1989)
- The Guide to Trout Fishing in Central Otago (1983, revised 1994, revised 2003)

=== Memoir ===
- Somebodies and Nobodies (Random House, 2002)

Cultural offices
Preceded by Elizabeth Smither	New Zealand Poet Laureate; 2003–2005	Succeeded by Jenny Bornholdt
