= Michael Jackson (anthropologist) =

New Zealand poet and anthropologist

- Born: 1940 (age 84–85); Nelson, New Zealand
- Education: Victoria University of Wellington (BA); University of Auckland (MA); Cambridge University (PhD)
- Occupation(s): Anthropologist, poet, philosopher, teacher
- Employer: Harvard Divinity School

Michael D. Jackson (born 1940) is a New Zealand poet and anthropologist who has taught in anthropology departments at Massey University, the Australian National University, Indiana University Bloomington, and the University of Copenhagen. He is currently distinguished professor of world religions at Harvard Divinity School.

== Career ==
Jackson is the founder of existential anthropology, a non-traditional sub-field of anthropology using ethnographic methods and drawing on traditions of phenomenology, existentialism, and critical theory, as well as American pragmatism, in exploring the human condition from the perspectives of both lifeworlds and worldviews, histories and biographies, collective representations and individual realities.

The struggle for being involves a struggle to reconcile shared and singular experiences, acting and being acted upon, being for others and being for oneself. But rather than polarise subject and object, Jackson emphasises the intersubjective negotiations at the heart of all relationships – whether between persons, persons and things, persons and language – and shows that being-in-the-world consists of endless dilemmas and constant oscillations in consciousness that admit of only temporary, imagined, narrative or ritualised resolutions. Insofar as anthropological understanding is attained through conversations and events in which the ethnographer's prejudices, ontological assumptions, and emotional dispositions are at play, the ethnographer cannot pretend to be an impartial observer, producing objective knowledge. Jackson's published work fully discloses the contexts in which understandings are negotiated, arrived at, or, in some instances, unattainable.

Jackson's recent books have explored diverse topics such as well-being in one of the world's poorest societies (Life Within Limits), the relation between religious experience and limit situations (The Palm at the End of the Mind), the interplay between egocentric and sociocentric modes of being (Between One and One Another), and writing as a technology for creating connections that transcend the limits of ordinary communication (The Other Shore).

== Fieldwork ==
He has conducted fieldwork among the Kuranko of Sierra Leone from 1969, among the Warlpiri of Australia's Northern Territory between 1989 and 1991, and among the Kuku Yalangi of Cape York Peninsula in 1993 and 1994.

His poetry has appeared in Poetry NZ. and in the Poetry Archive (UK). One critic wrote: In Dead Reckoning, Jackson deploys "a navigator’s term for estimating one’s location based upon extrapolations of distance and direction from one’s last-known position. The eponymous poem cements the metaphor’s connection to personal identity..." In Being of Two Minds (2012), Jackson explores the existential quandaries of being torn between seemingly irreconcilable affections, identifications, and places of personal anchorage. The critic Vincent O'Sullivan writes, "What one hears in his readings is the modest, confidant, international voice that drives his poems, the conversing of a man who, as ever, is on one road to find another."

== Education ==
Jackson holds a Bachelor of Arts from Victoria University of Wellington, a Master of Arts (postgraduate) from the University of Auckland, and a Doctor of Philosophy from Cambridge University.

== Awards ==
- 1981 New Zealand Book Award for Poetry for Wall
- 1982 Katherine Mansfield Fellowship
- 1995 Montana New Zealand Book Award for Pieces of Music

== Bibliography ==
- Latitudes of Exile: Poems 1965–1975 (1976)
- The Kuranko: Dimensions of Social Reality in a West African Society (1977)
- Wall: Poems 1976–1979 (1980)
- Allegories of the Wilderness: Ethics and Ambiguity in Kuranko Narratives (1982)
- Going On (1985)
- Barawa, and the Ways Birds Fly in the Sky (1986)
- Rainshadow (1988)
- Paths Towards a Clearing (1989)
- Duty Free: Selected Poems 1965–1988 (1989)
- Personhood and Agency: The Experience of Self and Other in African Cultures (1990)
- Pieces of Music (1994)
- At Home in the World (1995)
- Things As They Are: New Directions in Phenomenological Anthropology (1996)
- The Blind Impress (1997)
- Antipodes (1997)
- Minima Ethnographica (1998) Review
- The Politics of Storytelling: Violence, Transgression, and Intersubjectivity (2002)
- In Sierra Leone (2004)
- Existential Anthropology (2005) Review
- Dead Reckoning (2006)
- The Accidental Anthropologist: a Memoir (2006)
- Excursions (2007)
- The Palm at the End of the Mind: Relatedness, Religiosity, and the Real (2009)
- Life Within Limits: Well-being in a World of Want (2011)
- Between One and One Another (2013)
- Road Markings: An Anthropologist in the Antipodes (2012)
- The Other Shore: Essays on Writers and Writing (2013)
- Being of Two Minds (2012)
- Lifeworlds: Essays in Existential Anthropology (2013)
- Midwinter at Walden Pond (2013)
- The Wherewithal of Life: Ethics, Migration and the Question of Wellbeing (2013)
- Harmattan: A Philosophical Fiction (2015)
- Critique of Identity Thinking (2019)
- Dowsing (2021)
- The Genealogical Imagination: Two Studies of Life over Time (2021)
- Worlds Within and Worlds Without: Field Guide to an Intellectual Journey (2023)
- Friendship (2023)

== See also ==
- Philosophical anthropology
