= Sarah Wilkins =

New Zealand illustrator

Sarah Wilkins is a New Zealand illustrator, based in Wellington.

== Biography ==
Wilkins was born in Lower Hutt, New Zealand.

In 2003 she won the LIANZA Russell Clark Award for Illustration for The immigrants written by Alan Bagnall. She collaborated with Jenny Bornholdt on the children's picture book The Longest Breakfast. Wilkins has illustrated the covers of books including Nine Girls by Stacy Gregg, All Her Lives by Ingrid Horrocks, Delirious and Chemistry by Damien Wilkins.

In 2025 Poem for Ataahua by Alistair Te Ariki Campbell, illustrated by Wilkins, was shortlisted for the Russell Clark Award for Illustration in the New Zealand Book Awards for Children and Young Adults. The book was also shortlisted for the AOI World Illustration Awards.

She illustrated Race to the South Pole by Alexandra Stewart and published by Thames & Hudson in 2025. One reviewer commented that, "Stewart's narrative is vivid, fast-paced, and informative, while Wilkins' artwork is clear, detailed, realistic, and engrossing, with labeled bird's-eye and cross-section perspectives and maps that immerse readers in the surroundings".
