= Cilla McQueen =

New Zealand poet (born 1949)

Cilla McQueen MNZM
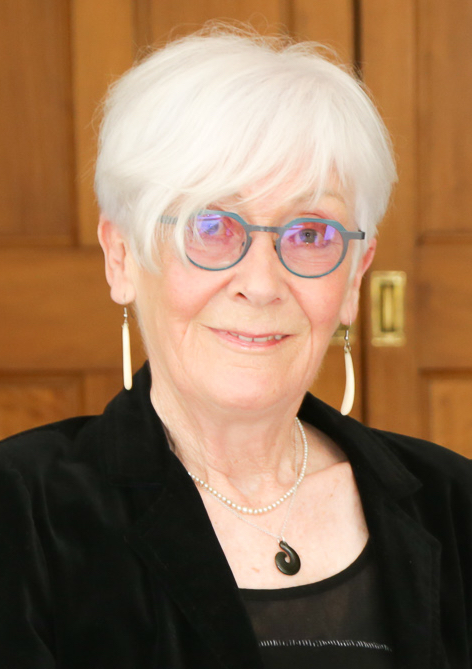
- McQueen in 2020
- Born: Priscilla Muriel McQueen; 22 January 1949 (age 77); Birmingham, England
- Occupation: Poet
- Spouses: Ralph Hotere (m. 1974–1986); Stewart Whaitiri (m. 1997; died 2002)
- Writing career
- Notable awards: New Zealand Book Award for Poetry (1983, 1989, 1991); New Zealand Poet Laureate (2009)

Priscilla Muriel McQueen MNZM (born 22 January 1949) is a New Zealand poet and three-time winner of the New Zealand Book Award for Poetry.

== Early years and education ==
McQueen was born on 22 January 1949 in Birmingham, England. Her family moved to New Zealand when she was four. She was educated at Columba College in Dunedin and University of Otago (Master's with first-class Honours in 1971). She was awarded an honorary Doctorate in Literature by University of Otago in 2008.

== Career ==
A poet and artist, she has published many collections, including two sound recordings and two selected works, of her poetry. In 2009 she was named New Zealand Poet Laureate. She also received the Prime Minister's Awards for Literary Achievement (Poetry) in 2010. Other awards include: NZ Book Award for Poetry 1983, 1989 and 1991; Robert Burns Fellowship at Otago University 1985 & 1986; Fulbright Visiting Writer's Fellowship 1985; Inaugural Australia-New Zealand Writer's Exchange Fellowship 1987; Goethe Institute Scholarship to Berlin 1988; NZ Queen Elizabeth Arts Council Scholarship in Letters 1992. Her most recent works are In a Slant Light, a poet's memoir (2016, Otago University Press), Poeta: Selected and New Poems (2018, Otago University Press), and a chapbook Qualia that is bundled with five other chapbooks by New Zealand poets in Bundle 1 (Maungatua Press 2020).

In 1999 McQueen was awarded the Southland Art Foundation Artist in Residence award, which allowed her to develop both poetry and painting simultaneously. Recent exhibitions of her art work include "Picture Poem", works by Cilla McQueen and Joanna Paul, at the Hocken Library, Dunedin, 2015 and an exhibition of intuitive musical scores, "What Happens", at the Brett McDowell Gallery, Dunedin, 2015. Thirteen of McQueen's graphic musical scores were included in Strange Terrain: A New Anthology of New Zealand Graphic Scores 1965-2012 (2014).

Cilla McQueen's poems include themes of homeland and loss, indigeneity, colonisation and displacement. She writes as a descendant of the people of the remote (and now abandoned) archipelago of St Kilda in the Outer Hebrides. Her writing also reflects her engagement with the history and present reality of the Maori people of Murihiku.

In the 2020 Queen's Birthday Honours, McQueen was appointed a Member of the New Zealand Order of Merit, for services as a poet.

== Personal life ==
McQueen was married to New Zealand artist Ralph Hotere from 1973 until the 1990s, and together they set up a studio and living space at Careys Bay, near Port Chalmers. McQueen was married to Stewart Whaitiri in 1997 until his death in 2002. She currently lives in Bluff, at the southern tip of New Zealand's South Island.

== Works ==
McQueen's work includes a variety of poetry books and poems over the past twenty-five years, including these volumes:

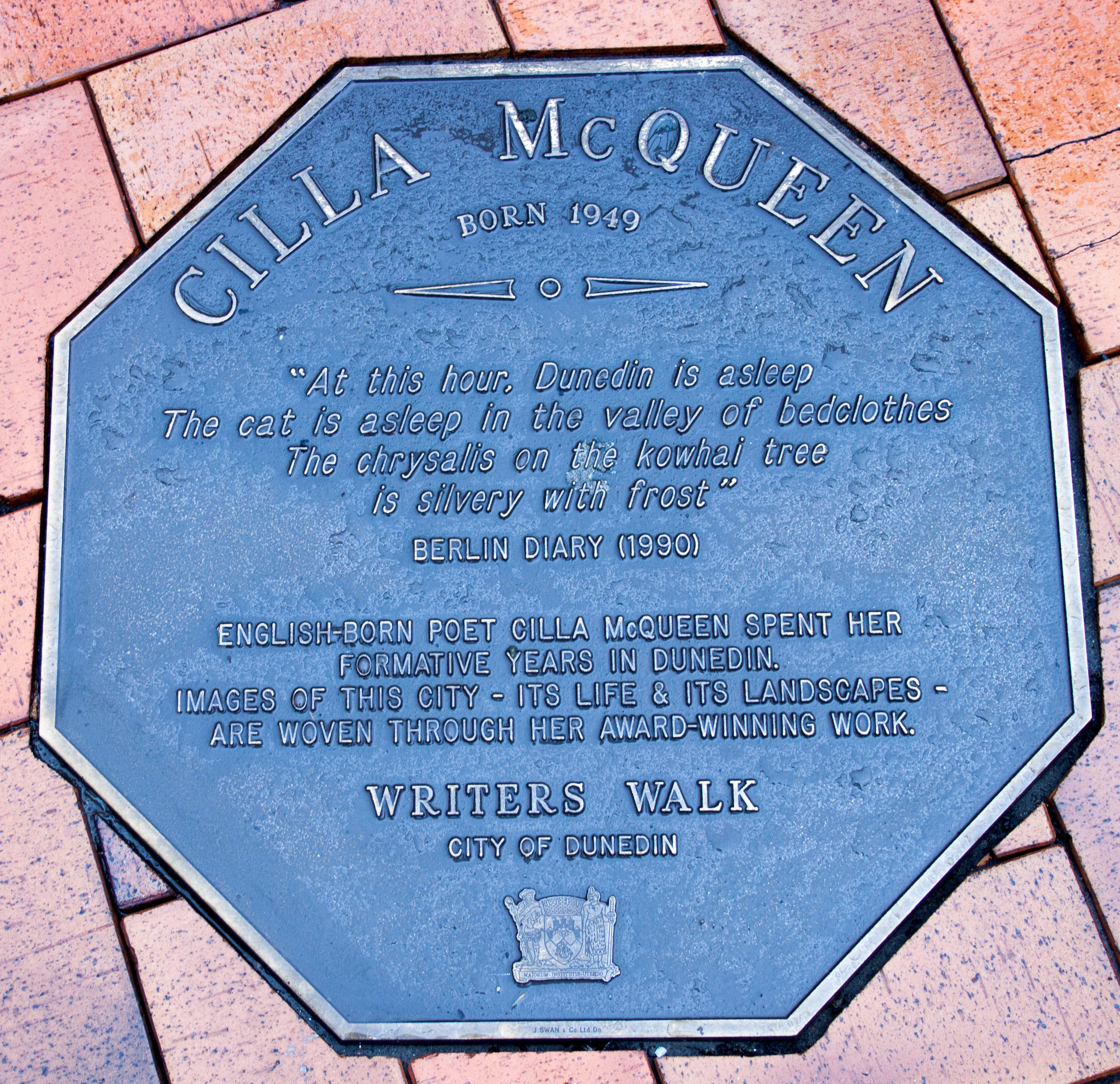
Plaque dedicated to Cilla McQueen in Dunedin, on the Writers' Walk on the Octagon

- 1982: Homing In, John McIndoe
- 1984: Anti Gravity, McIndoe
- 1985: Buick Electra
- 1986: Wild Sweets, McIndoe
- 1988: Benzina, John McIndoe
- 1989: Otherwise, recording on cassette, featuring music by Alistair MacDougall
- 1990: Berlin Diary, John McIndoe
- 1993: Crik'ey: New and Selected Poems, 1978-1994, McIndoe Publishers
- 2000: Markings: Poems and Drawings, Otago University Press
- 2001: Axis: Poems and Drawings, Otago University Press
- 2002: Soundings: Poems and Drawings, Otago University Press
- 2005: Fire-penny, Otago University Press
- 2006: A Wind Harp (compact disc)
- 2010: The Radio Room, Otago University Press
- 2014: Edwin's Egg and Other Poetic Novellas, Otago University Press
- 2014: An Island, letterpress edition, Mirrorcity Press
- 2016: In a Slant Light: A Poet's Memoir, Otago University Press
- 2018: Poeta: Selected and New Poems, Otago University Press
- 2020: Qualia, one of six chapbooks in Bundle 1, Maungatua Press

Cultural offices
Preceded by Michele Leggott	New Zealand Poet Laureate; 2009–2011	Succeeded by Ian Wedde
