= Michele Leggott =

New Zealand poet

Michele Joy Leggott MNZM (born 1956) is a New Zealand poet, and an emeritus professor of English at the University of Auckland. She was the New Zealand Poet Laureate between 2007 and 2009.

== Biography ==
Leggott was born in Stratford, New Zealand, and received her secondary education at New Plymouth Girls' High School, before attending the University of Canterbury where she completed an MA in English in 1979. She then moved to Canada to do a PhD at the University of British Columbia. Her dissertation was on the American poet Louis Zukofsky and was published as Reading Zukofsky’s 80 Flowers (1989).

Leggott began publishing her poetry around 1980. She published Sound Pitch Considered Forms with two Canadian poets in 1984. In 1985 she returned to New Zealand and took up a lectureship at the University of Auckland. She produced her first book of poems, Like This?, in 1988, winning the International PEN First Book of Poetry award.

In her collection of poetry, "As Far as I Can See" (Auckland University Press, 1999), Leggott wrote about her deep sorrow at losing her sight - she began going blind in 1985. Leggott was awarded a Blind Achievers Award by the Foundation for the Blind in 1999 for her work on "The Book of Nadath".

In 1991 she published Swimmers, Dancers, with a domestic focus, and in 1995 she won the New Zealand Book Award for Poetry with DIA. On 4 December 2007, she was named New Zealand Poet Laureate for 2008/2009.

Her work has appeared in the Best New Zealand Poems series in 2002 and 2005.

In the 2009 New Year Honours, Leggott was appointed a Member of the New Zealand Order of Merit, for services to poetry.

== Personal life ==
Michele is married to Mark Fryer, and they have 2 adult sons.

== Honours and awards ==
- 2008/09 New Zealand Poet Laureate
- 2013 Prime Minister's Awards for Literary Achievement

== Works ==
=== Poetry ===
- 1988: Like This?: Poems. Christchurch: Caxton Press
- 1991: Swimmers, Dancers. Auckland: Auckland University Press
- 1994: DIA. Auckland: Auckland University Press
- 1999: As far as I can see. Auckland: Auckland University Press
- 2005: Milk & Honey. Auckland: Auckland University Press
- 2006: Journey to Portugal. Images by Gretchen Albrecht. Auckland: Holloway Press
- 2009: Mirabile Dictu. Auckland: Auckland University Press
- 2014 Heartland. Auckland: Auckland University Press
- 2017 Vanishing Points. Auckland: Auckland University Press
- 2020 (March) Mezzaluna. Auckland: Auckland University Press; first published by Wesleyan University Press, US

=== Editor ===
- 1989: Reading Zukofsky's 80 Flowers, Baltimore: Johns Hopkins University Press
- 1995: The Victory Hymn, 1935-1995, by Robin Hyde; with an essay by Michele Leggott; Auckland: Holloway Press
- 1995: Opening the Book : New Essays on New Zealand Writing, Edited by Mark Williams and Michele Leggott; Auckland: Auckland University Press
- 1999: The book of Nadath, by Robin Hyde; introduction and notes by Michele Leggott; Auckland: Auckland University Press
- 2000: Big Smoke: New Zealand Poems 1960-1975, edited by Alan Brunton, Murray Edmond, Michele Leggott; Auckland: Auckland University Press
- 2003: Young Knowledge: the poems of Robin Hyde, edited and introduced by Michele Leggott; Auckland: Auckland University Press

=== Author ===
- 2025: Groundwork: The Art and Writing of Emily Cumming Harris, Co-authored by Michele Leggott and Catherine Field-Dodgson; Wellington: Te Papa Press

Cultural offices
Preceded by Jenny Bornholdt	New Zealand Poet Laureate; 2007–2009	Succeeded by Cilla McQueen
