= Alice Te Punga Somerville =

Poet, scholar, and irredentist

- Citizenship: Aotearoa New Zealand
- Occupations: Professor of English and of Critical Indigenous Studies at the University of British Columbia
- Awards: Mary and Peter Biggs Award for Poetry

Academic work
- Doctoral students: Jessica Lili Pasisi; Mere Taito
- Notable students: Karamea Moana Wright; Charlie Holland
- Main interests: Māori and Pacific studies, decolonial studies
- Notable works: Once were Pacific: Māori connections to Oceania; Always Italicise: How to Write While Colonised.
- Notable ideas: critical analysis of 'Māori' and 'Pacific' identifiers

Alice Te Punga Somerville (Te Āti Awa, Taranaki) is a poet, scholar and irredentist. Dr Te Punga Somerville is the author of Once were Pacific: Māori connections to Oceania which provides the first critical analysis of the disconnections and connections between 'Māori' and 'Pacific'. Her research work looks at texts by Māori, Pacific and Indigenous peoples that tell Indigenous stories. She does this in order to go beyond the constraints of the limited stories told about them. In 2023 she won New Zealand's top award for poetry, the Mary and Peter Biggs Award for Poetry, for her collection Always Italicise: How to Write While Colonised.

== Academic career ==
Te Punga Somerville completed a Master of Arts in English at the University of Auckland. She then completed her PhD in English and American Indian Studies at Cornell University in 2004.

From 2017 to 2021, Te Punga Somerville was Associate Professor and Associate Dean of Faculty of Māori and Indigenous Studies at University of Waikato. Her previously held academic posts have been Senior Lecturer in the School of English at Victoria University of Wellington which she held from 2005 to 2012, Associate Professor Department of English University of Hawai'i at Manoa which she held from 2012 to 2015 and Senior Lecturer Department of Indigenous Studies at Macquarie University from 2015 to 2017.

Since 2021, Te Punga Somerville has been the Professor of English and of Critical Indigenous Studies at the University of British Columbia.

== Awards ==
She was a Fulbright Graduate Award recipient to study at Cornell University in Ithaca, NY. She was awarded Best First Book from the Native American & Indigenous Studies Association in 2012, for Once Were Pacific. She was awarded the S.W. Brooks Fellowship 2016, University of Queensland, Australia. She was the recipient of Marsden Research Grant ($642,000) for the project Writing the new world: Indigenous texts '1900–1975.

With regards to her literary works, she was the recipient of a Marsden Fast Start Grant ($140,000) for Once Were Pacific. She was also the winner of the Mary and Peter Biggs Award for Poetry for her book Always Italicise at the 2023 Ockham New Zealand Book Awards. Her books Once Were Pacific and Two Hundred and Fifty Ways to Start an Essay About Captain Cook were featured in the Books of Mana: 180 Māori-Authored Books of Significance published in 2025.

== Selected works ==
=== Selected journals ===
- Te Punga Somerville, Alice (2023). "Show Me the Bibliography: Indigeneity and the Eighteenth Century". Eighteenth-Century Studies. 56' (2): 255–260.
- Te Punga Somerville, Alice. (2021). "OMG settler colonial studies: response to Lorenzo Veracini: 'Is Settler Colonial Studies Even Useful?'". Postcolonial Studies, 24(2). 278–282.

=== Selected publications ===
- Te Punga Somerville, Alice. Once were Pacific: Māori connections to Oceania. University of Minnesota Press. 2012.
- Te Punga Somerville, Alice. Two Hundred and Fifty Ways to Start an Essay about Captain Cook. Bridget Williams Books. 2020.
- Te Punga Somerville, Alice. Always Italicise: How to write while colonised. Auckland University Press. 2022.

=== Work appears in ===
- Rakuraku M. & Manasiadis V. Tātai Whetū: Seven Māori Women poets in translation. Seraph Press. 2018.
- Alison J. & Hoskins T. Critical Conversations in Kaupapa Māori. Huia Publishers. 2017.
- Anderson W., Johnson M. & Brookes B. Pacific Futures: Past and Present. University of Hawai‘i Press. 2018.
- Wendt, Albert; Whaitiri, Reina; Sullivan, Robert, eds. (December 2002). Whetu Moana: Contemporary Polynesian Poetry in English. Auckland Univ Press. ISBN 9781869402730.
- Whaitiri, Reina; Sullivan, Robert, eds. (September 2014). Puna Wai Kōrero: An Anthology of Māori Poetry in English. Auckland: Auckland University Press. ISBN 9781869408176.
- Ruru J. & Nikora L. Ngā Kete Mātauranga: Māori Scholars at the Research Interface. Otago University Press. 2021.
