= Elizabeth Nannestad =

New Zealand poet

Elizabeth Nannestad (born 1956 in Browns Bay, Auckland) is a New Zealand poet.

== Life ==
She studied medicine at Otago University and has worked as a doctor and forensic psychiatrist. She lives and works in Auckland.

Her work has been published in Sport, Poetry New Zealand, Landfall and Islands.

== Awards ==
- 1987 New Zealand Book Award for Poetry with Allen Curnow

== Works ==
- "Immediately After", Seeing voices
- Jump. Auckland University Press. 1986. ISBN 978-1-86940-001-9.
- If He's a Good Dog He'll Swim. Auckland University Press. 1996. ISBN 978-1-86940-146-7.
- Wild Like Me. Victoria University Press. 2013. ISBN 9780864738813.

=== Anthologies ===
- My Heart Goes Swimming: New Zealand Love Poems (1996)
- Jenny Bornholdt; Gregory O'Brien; Mark Williams, eds. (1997). An Anthology of New Zealand Poetry in English. Oxford University Press New Zealand. ISBN 978-0-19-558338-0.
- Lauris Dorothy Edmond, ed. (2000). New Zealand love poems: an Oxford anthology. Oxford University Press. ISBN 978-0-19-558398-4.
