= New Zealand Poet Laureate =

Poet officially appointed by National Library of New Zealand

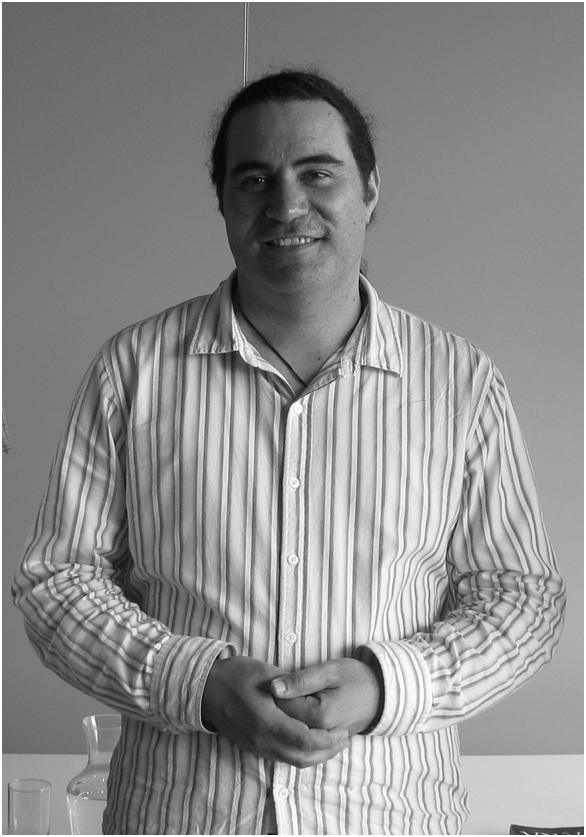
- Incumbent; Robert Sullivan since 22 August 2025
- Style: Poet Laureate
- Type: Honorary title
- Appointer: National Library of New Zealand
- Term length: Three years (two years before 2019)
- Formation: 1997
- First holder: Bill Manhire

The New Zealand poet laureate is a poet appointed by the National Library of New Zealand to represent New Zealand's community of poets, to promote and advocate for poetry, and to produce a number of published works during their three-year tenure as laureate.

The current New Zealand poet laureate is Robert Sullivan.

== History of the award ==
The poet laureate for New Zealand was not originally appointed by a government agency, but by a commercial company. The award was established by Te Mata Estate, a winery in Hawke's Bay, in 1997, the year of the winery's centenary. Bill Manhire was named the first Te Mata poet laureate.

In 2007, the National Library of New Zealand took over the appointment of the poet laureate.

== Nomination ==
The National Library accepts public nominations for the position, as well as nominations from universities, libraries and creative writing programmes. The National Librarian of New Zealand then makes the decision following advice from the Poet Laureate Advisory Council, which currently includes first laureate Bill Manhire and Te Mata Estate chairman John Buck.

== Award ==
The value of the award granted to the poet laureate is currently NZ$150,000, of which twenty per cent is retained by the National Library to cover costs such as events, promotion, and the laureate's tokotoko. A tokotoko is a Māori carved ceremonial walking stick which is presented to the laureate upon their appointment. The tokotoko is paired with the matua, or "parent tokotoko" which is retained and displayed by the National Library to signify their joint guardianship of the award with the Ngāti Kahungunu. The tokotoko are created by Hawke's Bay artist Jacob Scott, with the matua carved from black maire and containing a poem by the late Hone Tuwhare, the 1999–2001 laureate.

Based on the tradition of the poet laureate of the United Kingdom receiving a "butt of sack", the New Zealand poet laureate also receives a stipend of wine from Te Mata Estate.

== List of New Zealand poets laureate ==
| | Name | Term of laureateship |
|---|---|---|
| 1 | Bill Manhire | 1997–1999 |
| 2 | Hone Tuwhare | 1999–2001 |
| 3 | Elizabeth Smither | 2001–2003 |
| 4 | Brian Turner | 2003–2005 |
| 5 | Jenny Bornholdt | 2005–2007 |
| 6 | Michele Leggott | 2007–2009 |
| 7 | Cilla McQueen | 2009–2011 |
| 8 | Ian Wedde | 2011–2013 |
| 9 | Vincent O'Sullivan | 2013–2015 |
| 10 | C. K. Stead | 2015–2017 |
| 11 | Selina Tusitala Marsh | 2017–2019 |
| 12 | David Eggleton | 2019–2022 |
| 13 | Chris Tse | 2022–2025 |
| 14 | Robert Sullivan | 2025–2028 |

== See also ==
- Te Awhi Rito New Zealand Reading Ambassador
