= Hone Tuwhare =

New Zealand poet

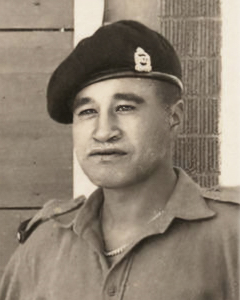
- Tuwhare during his service with in Japan with J Force following the end of World War II
- Born: Hone Peneamine Anatipa Te Pona Tuwhare; 21 October 1922; Kaikohe, New Zealand
- Died: 16 January 2008 (aged 85); Dunedin, New Zealand
- Occupation: Poet

Hone Peneamine Anatipa Te Pona Tuwhare (21 October 1922 – 16 January 2008) was a noted Māori New Zealand poet. He is closely associated with The Catlins in the Southland region of New Zealand, where he lived for the latter part of his life.

== Early years ==
Tuwhare was born in Kaikohe, Northland, into the Ngāpuhi tribe (hapū Ngati Korokoro, Ngāti Tautahi, Te Popoto, Te Uri-o-Hua). Following the death of his mother, his family shifted to Auckland, where Hone attended primary schools in Avondale, Māngere and Ponsonby. He apprenticed as a boilermaker with the New Zealand Railways and took night classes in Mathematics, Trade Drawing and Trade Theory at Seddon Memorial Technical College (1939–41) and Otahuhu College (1941). Tuwhare spoke Māori until he was about 9, and his father, an accomplished orator and storyteller, encouraged his son's interest in the written and spoken word, especially in the rhythms and imagery of the Old Testament.

== Poetry career ==
Starting in 1939, Tuwhare, encouraged by fellow poet R.A.K. Mason, began to write while working as an apprentice at the Otahuhu Railway Workshops.

In 1956, Tuwhare started writing seriously after resigning from a local branch of the Communist party. His first, and arguably best known work, No Ordinary Sun, was published in 1964 to widespread acclaim and subsequently reprinted ten times over the next 30 years, becoming one of the most widely read individual collections of poetry in New Zealand history.

When Tuwhare's poems first began to appear in the late 1950s and early 1960s they were recognised as a new departure in New Zealand poetry, cutting across the debates and divisions between the 1930s and post-war generations. Much of the works' originality was the result of their distinctly Māori perspective. The poems were marked by their tonal variety, the naturalness with which they could move between formal and informal registers, between humour and pathos, intimacy and controlled anger and, especially, in their assumption of easy vernacular familiarity with New Zealand readers.

During the 1970s Tuwhare became involved in Māori cultural and political initiatives. This same era also saw his international reputation grow, with invitations to visit both China and Germany, which, among other opportunities, lead to the publication of Was wirklicher ist als Sterben in 1985.

In 1990, artist Selwyn Muru incorporated a haiku written by Tuwhare into Waharoa, a sculptural gateway at the entrance of Aotea Square in Auckland. Muru translated the piece into Māori, and inscribed this alongside Tuwhare's original words.

While his earlier poems were kept in print, new work was constantly produced. Tuwhare's play, "In the Wilderness Without a Hat", was published in 1991. Three further collections of poetry then followed: Short Back and Sideways: Poems & Prose (1992), Deep River Talk (1993), and Shape-Shifter (1997). In 1999 he was named New Zealand's second Te Mata Poet Laureate, the outcome of which was the publication Piggy-Back Moon (2002).

The poet moved to Kaka Point in South Otago in 1992, and many of his later poems reflected the scenery of The Catlins area, and the seafood available. He had a strong working relationship with fellow Otago artist Ralph Hotere, and their work often referenced each other. Tuwhare's poem "Rain" was in 2007 voted New Zealand's favourite poem by a clear margin.

Poetry by Tuwhare was included in UPU, a curation of Pacific Island writers' work which was first presented at the Silo Theatre as part of the Auckland Arts Festival in March 2020. UPU was remounted as part of the Kia Mau Festival in Wellington in June 2021.

== Recognition and awards ==
Tuwhare was awarded the Robert Burns Fellowship from the University of Otago in 1969 and again in 1974. He was awarded the University of Auckland Literary Fellowship in 1991. In 1999, he was named New Zealand's second Te Mata Poet Laureate. At the end of his two-year term he published Piggy Back Moon (2001), which was shortlisted in the 2002 Montana New Zealand Book Awards.

Tuwhare was among ten of New Zealand's greatest living artists named as Arts Foundation of New Zealand Icon Artists at a ceremony in 2003.

In 2003, Tuwhare was awarded one of the inaugural Prime Minister's Awards for Literary Achievement, for poetry. The other winners were novelist Janet Frame and historian Michael King. Each recipient received a cash prize of $60,000 NZD. The awards are aimed at New Zealand writers who have made an outstanding contribution to the nation's literary and cultural history.

Tuwhare received an honorary Doctor of Literature degree from The University of Auckland in 2005. At the time of his death Tuwhare was described as "New Zealand's most distinguished Maori writer".

== Hone Tuwhare Charitable Trust ==
In July 2010 the Hone Tuwhare Charitable trust was formed in honour of Tuwhare. Their goal is: "To inspire people through the preservation, promotion, and celebration of Hone's legacy".

== Works ==
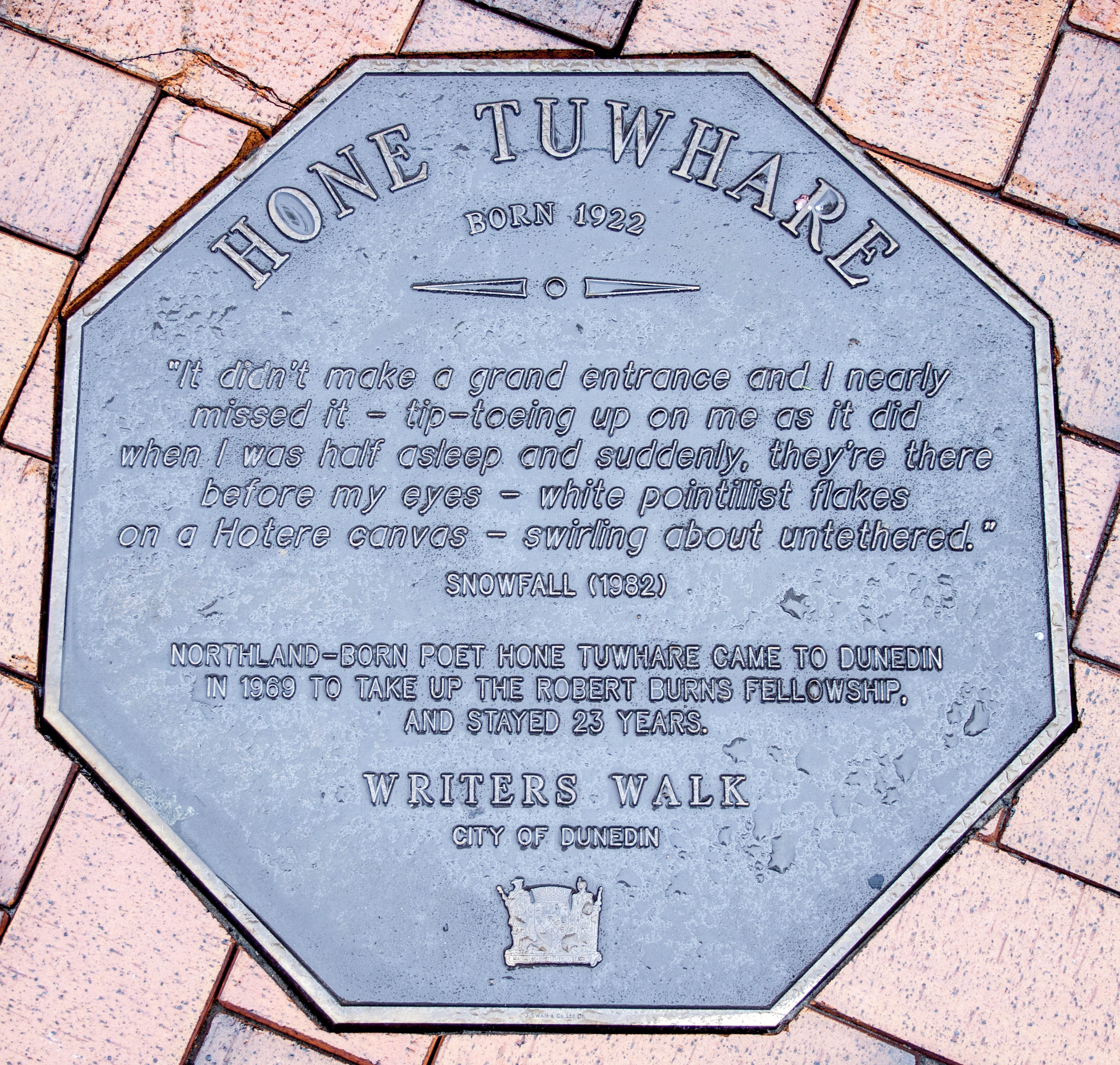
Memorial plaque dedicated to Tūwhare in Dunedin, on the Writers' Walk on the Octagon

- No Ordinary Sun, Auckland, Blackwood and Janet Paul, 1964
- Come Rain Hail, Dunedin, University of Otago, 1970
- Sapwood and Milk, Dunedin, Caveman Press, 1972
- Something Nothing, Dunedin, Caveman Press, 1973
- Making a Fist of It, Dunedin, Jackstraw Press, 1978
- Selected Poems, Dunedin, McIndoe, 1980
- Year of the Dog. Dunedin, McIndoe, 1982
- Was wirklicher ist als Sterben, Straelen, Straelener-Ms.-Verl, 1985
- Mihi: Collected Poems, Auckland, Penguin, 1987
- Short Back & Sideways, Auckland, Godwit, 1992
- Deep River Talk: Collected Poems, Honolulu, University of Hawaii Press, 1994
- Shape-Shifter, Wellington, Steele Roberts, 1997
- Piggy-back Moon, Auckland, Godwit, 2001
- Oooooo......!!!, Wellington, Steele Roberts, 2005
- Friend, Whangarei, Noah

Cultural offices
Preceded by Bill Manhire	New Zealand Poet Laureate; 1999–2001	Succeeded by Elizabeth Smither
