= Jenny Bornholdt =

New Zealand poet

Jenny Bornholdt MNZM
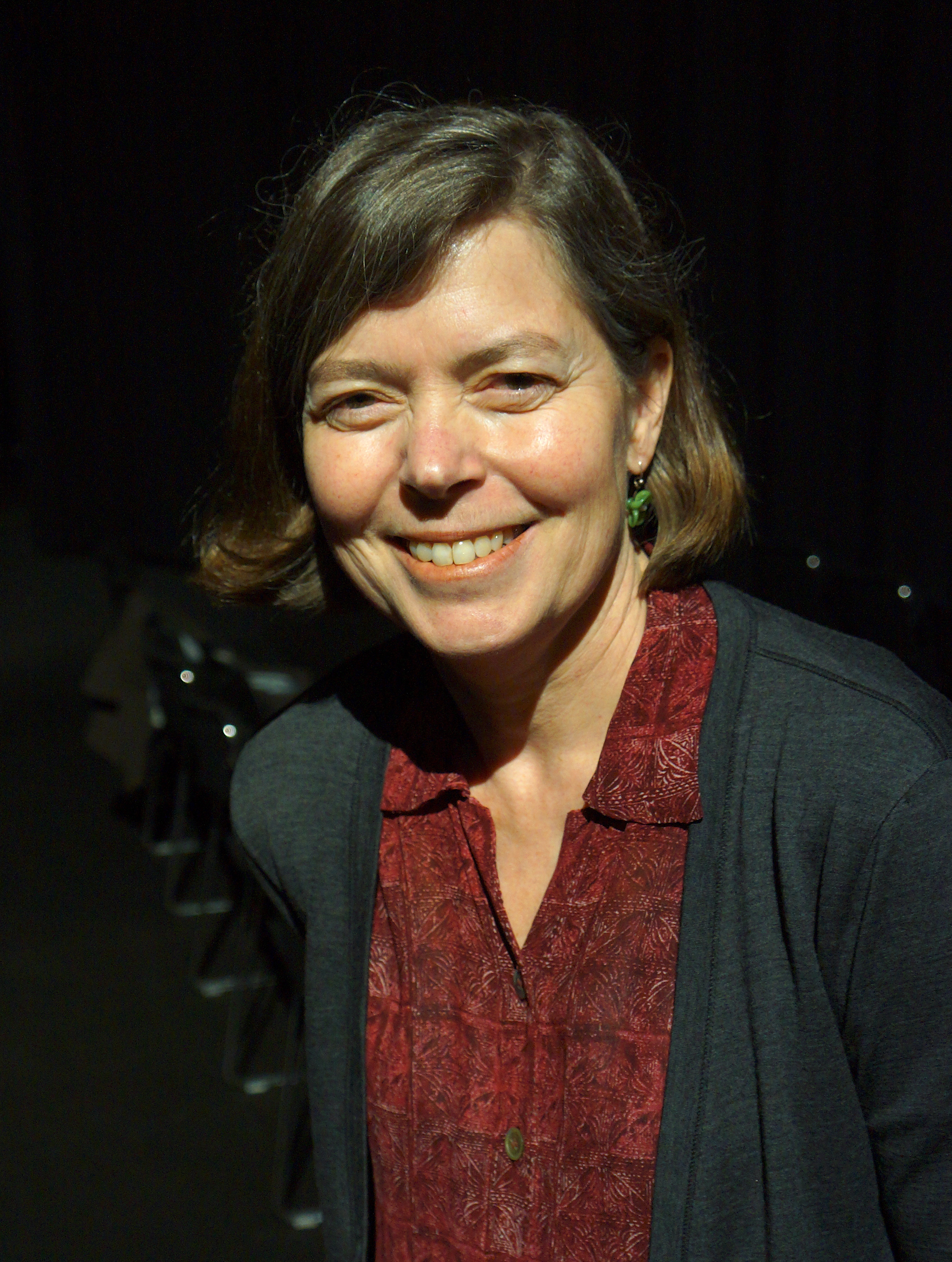
- Bornholdt at 2012 Frankfurt Book Fair

5th New Zealand Poet Laureate
- In office 2005–2007
- Preceded by: Brian Turner
- Succeeded by: Michele Leggott

Personal details
- Born: Jennifer Mary Bornholdt; 1 November 1960 (age 65) Lower Hutt, New Zealand
- Spouse: Gregory O'Brien

Jennifer Mary Bornholdt MNZM (born 1 November 1960) is a New Zealand poet and anthologist. She was New Zealand's Poet Laureate in 2005–07.

== Early life ==
Born in Lower Hutt, Bornholdt received a bachelor's degree in English Literature and a Diploma in Journalism. She studied poetry with Bill Manhire at Victoria University of Wellington in 1984.

== Career ==
She is co-editor of My Heart Goes Swimming: New Zealand Love Poems and the Oxford Anthology of New Zealand Poetry in English, which won the Montana New Zealand Book Award for Poetry in 1997. In addition, Bornholdt won the 2002 Meridian Energy Katherine Mansfield Memorial Fellowship, was a recipient of one of the 2003 Arts Foundation of New Zealand Laureate Awards, and was named the fifth Te Mata Estate New Zealand Poet Laureate in 2005. Her poems were selected for the Best New Zealand Poems series in 2001, 2002, 2003 and 2005.

Bornholdt's collection The Rocky Shore received the Montana New Zealand Book Award for Poetry in 2009.

In the 2014 New Year Honours, Bornholdt was appointed a Member of the New Zealand Order of Merit, for services as a poet.

In 2023 Te Herenga Waka University Press published A Garden is a Long Time by Bornholdt and Annemarie Hope-Cross.

== Personal life ==
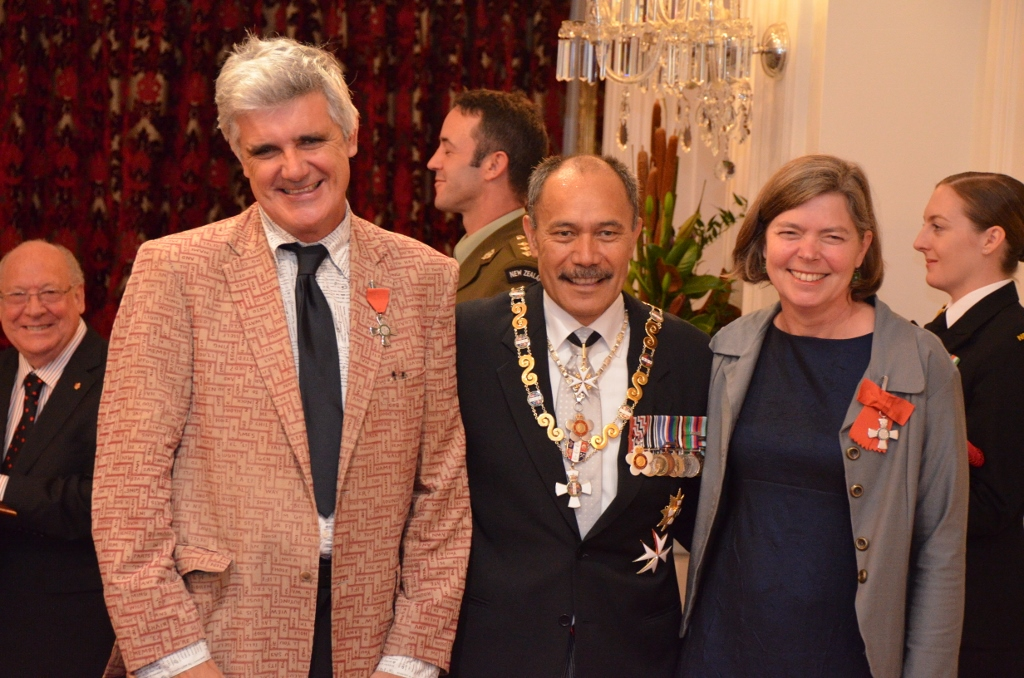
Gregory O'Brien and Jenny Bornholdt MNZM investitures

She lives in Wellington, and is married to poet Gregory O'Brien.

== Books ==
=== Poetry ===
Bornholdt's poetry has been published in a number of volumes:

- 1988: This Big Face
- 1989: Moving House
- 1991: Waiting Shelter
- 1995: How We Met
- 1997: Miss New Zealand: Selected Poems
- 2000: These Days
- 2003: Summer
- 2008: The Rocky Shore
- 2011: The Hill of Wool
- 2016: Selected Poems
- 2019: Lost and Somewhere Else
- 2023: A Garden is a Long Time (with Annemarie Hope-Cross)
- 2026: What to Wear

=== Children's books ===
- 2013: A Book is A Book illustrated by Sarah Wilkins
- 2017: The Longest Breakfast illustrated by Sarah Wilkins

=== Editor ===
- Co-editor, with Gregory O'Brien, My Heart Goes Swimming: New Zealand Love Poems, Random House New Zealand (2000) ISBN 0-908877-81-1, ISBN 978-0-908877-81-2
- Co-editor Oxford Anthology of New Zealand Poetry in English
- Editor, Short Poems of New Zealand, Te Herenga Waka University Press (2018)

Cultural offices
Preceded by Brian Turner	New Zealand Poet Laureate; 2005–2007	Succeeded by Michele Leggott
