= Elizabeth Smither =

New Zealand poet and fiction writer (born 1941)

Elizabeth Edwina Smither MNZM (born 15 September 1941) is a New Zealand poet, novelist and short story writer. She is best known for her poems, having published over fifteen poetry collections, received the New Zealand Book Award for poetry on three occasions, and served as the New Zealand Poet Laureate (2001–2003).

== Life and career ==
Smither was born in New Plymouth, and worked there part-time as a librarian.

Her first collection of poetry, Here Come the Clouds, was published in 1975, when she was in her mid-thirties. She has since published over fifteen poetry collections, as well as several short story collections and novels. Her work has won numerous notable awards, including three times the top poetry award at the New Zealand Book Awards. In 2002, she was named the New Zealand Poet Laureate.

Harry Ricketts, writing for The Oxford Companion to New Zealand Literature, describes her strength as being "the short poem, usually but not always unrhymed, witty, stylish and intellectually curious". He also notes that her poetry tends to feature figures from literature and legends, as well as Catholicism.

In 2025, it was reported that Smither's book, Angel Train, was disqualified from the 2026 Ockham New Zealand Book Awards because its cover was created using artificial intelligence.

== Awards ==
- 1987 Scholarship in Letters
- 1989 Lilian Ida Smith Award (non-fiction)
- 1990 New Zealand Book Award for Poetry
- 1992 Scholarship in Letters
- 2000 Montana New Zealand Book Award for Poetry
- 2002 Te Mata Poet Laureate
- 2008 Prime Minister's Award for Literary Achievement in poetry
- 2012 Landfall Essay Competition
- 2014 NZSA Janet Frame Memorial Award
- 2016 Sarah Broom Poetry Prize
- 2018 Ockhams New Zealand Book Award for Poetry

== Bibliography ==
=== Poetry ===
==== Collections ====
- Smither, Elizabeth (1975). Here come the clouds : poems. A. Taylor.
- You’re Very Seductive William Carlos Williams (1978)
- The Sarah Train (1980)
- The Legend of Marcello Mastroianni's wife (1981)
- Casanova's Ankle (1981)
- Shakespeare Virgins (1983)
- Professor Musgrove's Canary (1986)
- Gorilla/ Guerilla (1986)
- Animaux (1988)
- A Pattern of Marching (1989)
- A Cortège of Daughters (1993)
- The Tudor Style: Poems New and Selected (1993)
- A question of gravity: selected poems. Arc Publications. 2004. ISBN 978-1-900072-75-5.
- — (2007). The year of adverbs. Auckland University Press.
- Horse Playing the Accordion (Ahadada Books, Tokyo & Toronto, 2009)
- The Love of One Orange
- — (2013). The blue coat. Auckland University Press.
- — (2013). Ruby Duby Du. Illustrated by Kathryn Madill. Cold Hub Press.

==== Anthologies ====
- Jenny Bornholdt; Gregory O'Brien; Mark Williams, eds. (1997). An anthology of New Zealand poetry in English. Oxford University Press New Zealand. ISBN 978-0-19-558338-0.
- Vincent O'Sullivan, ed. (1987). An Anthology of twentieth century New Zealand poetry. Oxford University Press. ISBN 978-0-19-558163-8.

==== List of poems ====
Title	Year	First published	Reprinted/collected
Last sister		Smither, Elizabeth (n.d.). "Last sister". Inertia. 4. Archived from the original on 4 May 2009.	
A cortege of daughters		Smither, Elizabeth (n.d.). "A cortege of daughters". Inertia. 4. Archived from the original on 4 May 2009.	
An error on a quiz programme		Smither, Elizabeth (n.d.). "An error on a quiz programme". Inertia. 4. Archived from the original on 4 May 2009.	
Two security guards talking about Jupiter	2007	Smither, Elizabeth (April 2007). "Two security guards talking about Jupiter". Snorkel. 5.	
The self, for Antigone Kefala	2008	Smither, Elizabeth (March 2008). "The self, for Antigone Kefala". Foam:e. 5.	
Plaits	2008	Smither, Elizabeth (March 2008). "Plaits". Foam:e. 5.	
Night horse	2014	Smither, Elizabeth (Autumn 2014). "Night horse". Meanjin. 73 (1): 16.	

=== Novels ===
- First Blood (1983)
- Brother-love Sister-love (1986)
- The Sea Between Us (2003) 2004 Finalist for the Montana New Zealand Book Awards

=== Short stories ===
- Nights at the Embassy (1990)
- Mr Fish (1994)

Cultural offices
Preceded by Hone Tuwhare	New Zealand Poet Laureate; 2001–2003	Succeeded by Brian Turner
