= Chris Tse (New Zealand writer) =

New Zealand writer (born 1982)

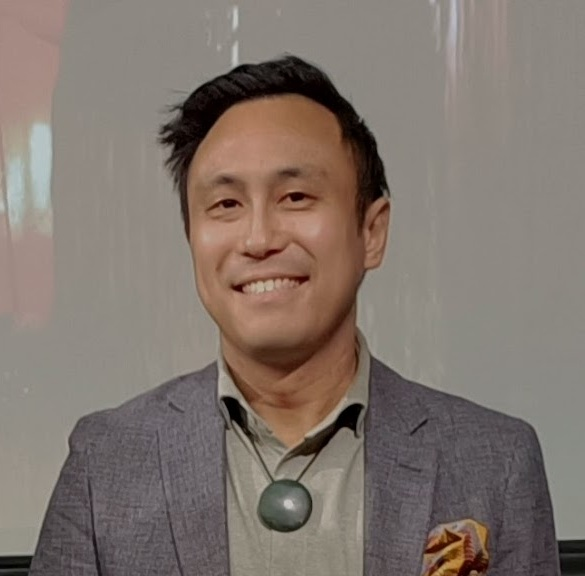
- Tse in 2024
- Born: 1982 (age 43–44); Lower Hutt, New Zealand
- Education: Victoria University of Wellington
- Occupations: Poet; short story writer; editor
- Writing career
- Language: English
- Notable work: How to be Dead in a Year of Snakes
- Notable awards: Jessie Mackay Award for Best First Book of Poetry (2016); New Zealand Poet Laureate (2022–2025)

Chris Tse (born 1982) is a New Zealand poet, short story writer and editor. His works explore questions of identity, including his Chinese heritage and queer identity. His first full-length poetry collection, How to be Dead in a Year of Snakes, won the Jessie Mackay Award for Best First Book of Poetry at the Ockham New Zealand Book Awards in 2016. In 2022, he was appointed as the New Zealand Poet Laureate from 2022 to 2024. In February 2024, his term was extended by another year.

== Background ==
Tse was born in 1982 in Lower Hutt, New Zealand. He is of Chinese heritage, which is the subject of much of his work. He began writing poetry as a teenager. He studied film and English literature at Victoria University of Wellington, where he also completed a Master of Arts degree in creative writing from the International Institute of Modern Letters.

Tse lives and works in Wellington.

== Works ==
The major themes of Tse's writing include identity, his Chinese heritage and the experiences of Chinese immigrants to New Zealand in the twentieth century. In 2009 he won an award for his short story, "At Two Speeds", in a competition held by the New Zealand Listener and the New Zealand Chinese Association.

Tse's first appearance in a major publication was the joint collection AUP New Poets 4 (with Harry Jones and Erin Scudder), published by Auckland University Press in 2011). Tse's section in the book, "Sing Joe", recounts his great-grandfather's immigration to New Zealand at the turn of the twentieth century, as well as Tse's own return to China as an adult.

In 2014, Auckland University Press published Tse's first full-length collection, How to be Dead in a Year of Snakes. The collection is a book-length sequence that revisits the 1905 murder of Joe Kum Yung who was shot and killed by Lionel Terry. How to be Dead in a Year of Snakes was a finalist in the poetry category at the 2016 Ockham New Zealand Book Awards, where it won the Jessie Mackay Award for Best First Book of Poetry.

Tse's second collection, He's So MASC, was published by Auckland University Press in March 2018. The collection explores themes of identity, sexuality and pop culture.

In November 2021, Auckland University Press published Out Here: An Anthology of Takatapui and LGBTQIA+ writers from Aotearoa, edited by Tse and poet Emma Barnes. The anthology is the first major anthology of queer writing published in New Zealand, featuring 69 writers from across the rainbow spectrum.

In 2022, Auckland University Press published Tse's third collection, Super Model Minority. The collection expands on themes from his previous collections and has been described as the final part in 'a loose trilogy'. In 2023, the collection was longlisted for the Mary and Peter Biggs Award for Poetry at the Ockham New Zealand Book Awards and was a finalist for the Lambda Literary Award for Gay Poetry.

Tse's fourth poetry collection, Dance-Floor Romance, was published in 2026. The collection explores themes of joy and nostalgia, and was mostly written during his term as New Zealand Poet Laureate from 2022-2025. In a review for the Otago Daily Times, Hamesh Wyatt described the poems as "bouncing and alive" and noted that "[Tse's] voice has simply got stronger over the years".

== Poet Laureate ==
In August 2022, the National Library of New Zealand named Chris Tse as the next New Zealand Poet Laureate. He was the youngest person appointed to the role to date. Tse told Stuff News that the work of previous poet laureates had meant "so much" to him as a young poet, and that he wanted to use his platform to move poetry into the mainstream more.

In February 2024, the National Library extended the position of New Zealand Poet Laureate from a two-year tenure to a three-year term. Tse completed his term in August 2025.

== Awards ==
- New Zealand Listener / New Zealand Chinese Association Short Story Prize (2009) for "At Two Speeds"
- How to Be Dead in a Year of Snakes, Jessie Mackay Award for Best First Book of Poetry at the 2016 Ockham New Zealand Book Awards

Cultural offices
Preceded by David Eggleton	New Zealand Poet Laureate; 2022–2025	Succeeded by Robert Sullivan
