= Marilyn Duckworth =

New Zealand writer

Marilyn Duckworth OBE
- Born: Marilyn Rose Adcock; 10 November 1935 (age 90); Ōtāhuhu, New Zealand
- Occupations: Novelist; poet; short story writer
- Spouses: Harry Duckworth (m. 1955; div. 1964) Ian Macfarlane (m. 1964; div. 1972) Daniel Donovan (m. 1974; died 1978) John Batsone (m. 1985)
- Children: 4
- Relatives: Fleur Adcock (sister)
- Writing career
- Notable awards: Prime Minister's Award for Literary Achievement (2016)

Marilyn Rose Duckworth OBE (née Adcock; born 10 November 1935) is a New Zealand novelist, poet and short story writer. Since her first novel was published at the age of 23 in 1959, she has published fifteen novels, one novella, a collection of short stories and a collection of poetry. Many of her novels feature women with complex lives and relationships. She has also written for television and radio. Over the course of her career she has received a number of prestigious awards including the top prize for fiction at the New Zealand Book Awards for Disorderly Conduct (1984) and a Prime Minister's Award for Literary Achievement in 2016.

== Early life and family ==
Duckworth was born in the suburb of Ōtāhuhu in Auckland, New Zealand. Her family spent the years between 1939 and 1947 in England. Her father Cyril Adcock was a psychologist and Esperantist, her mother was the poet Irene Adcock, and her sister was the poet Fleur Adcock.

She has had four husbands and has four daughters, and during her life has had close personal friendships with other writers including Maurice Shadbolt, Maurice Duggan and James K. Baxter.

== Career ==
=== Early career ===
Duckworth's first novel, A Gap in the Spectrum, was published in England when she was 23. Both her first novel and her second, The Matchbox House (1960), were set in England. Many of her novels focus on women juggling their domestic life and relationships, although some of her novels including Pulling Faces (1987) and Leather Wings (1995) feature male narrators. Academic Terry Sturm describes her female heroines as "earnestly engaged in a search for their own identities". Kevin Ireland praised her novels for their wit and crisp dialogue; she is also known for her observational skills.

Her third novel, A Barbarous Tongue (1963), won an award for achievement from the New Zealand Literary Fund, and was followed by In Over the Fence is Out (1969) which was set in both England and New Zealand and her first poetry collection Other Lovers' Children (1975). Around this time she wrote radio plays Home to Mother (1976) and Feet First (1981), radio adaptations of both Gap in the Spectrum and A Barbarous Tongue, television script The Smiler and the Knife (1971) and several episodes of 1975–1983 series Close to Home. In 1980 she received the Katherine Mansfield Menton Fellowship which enabled her to spend a year working in Menton, France.

=== 1980s and 1990s ===
Duckworth did not publish another novel until Disorderly Conduct in 1984. Sturm describes this as beginning her "extremely prolific" second career. This novel won the top prize for fiction at the New Zealand Book Awards in 1985. It is about a woman trying to manage relationships with several lovers and the demands of her children during the 1981 Springbok tour of New Zealand. It was followed by Married Alive (1985) set in a future New Zealand afflicted by an epidemic, and Rest for the Wicked (1986) involving a woman's volunteer work for a sleep research company and how that impacts on her family and relationships.

Janet Wilson has said that Duckworth's best novels "have a New Zealand, specifically Wellington, suburban setting, and often foreground the personal saga against contemporary public events or themes". She cites in particular Pulling Faces (1987) and Messages from Harpo (1989); the latter involves three generations of women dealing with social and legal changes in 1980s New Zealand. In the 1990s her novels included Unlawful Entry (1992), Seeing Red (1993), Leather Wings (1995) and Studmuffin (1997); a number of these dealt with darker sexual themes such as incest. In 1996 she edited Cherries on a Plate: New Zealand Writers Talk About their Sisters; she and her sister Adcock also both contributed essays to this work.

=== Later career ===
In 2000 she published her autobiography, Camping on the Faultline. Her later novels include Swallowing Diamonds (2003), about a young woman who has grown up in Wainuiomata, and Playing Friends (2007), about an older widowed woman who moves in with a friend and a pregnant teenager. Her second poetry collection, The Chiming Blue, was published in 2017.

In 2016 Duckworth received the 2016 Prime Minister's Award for Literary Achievement in fiction, which is awarded to an author with a distinguished body of work. Duckworth said in response:

I'd been cheerfully resigned to being nowhere in the attention span of the literary world. Suddenly it’s here upon me, which is great.

== Honours, awards and nominations ==
- 1963: New Zealand Literary Fund Award for Achievement for A Barbarous Tongue
- 1985: New Zealand Book Award for Fiction for Disorderly Conduct
- 1995: Wattie Book of the Year Award (shortlisted) for Disorderly Conduct
- 1987: Appointed an Officer of the Order of the British Empire, for services to literature, in the 1987 Queen's Birthday Honours
- 1996: Commonwealth Writers' Prize (shortlisted) for Leather Wings
- 2011–2012: President of Honour of the New Zealand Society of Authors
- 2016: Prime Minister's Award for Literary Achievement – Fiction

== Fellowships and grants ==
- Literary Fund Scholarship in Letters (1961 and 1972)
- Katherine Mansfield Menton Fellowship, Menton, France (1980)
- Fulbright Visiting Writer's Fellowship, United States (1987)
- Australia New Zealand Writers' Exchange Fellowship (1989)
- Victoria University of Wellington Writer's Fellowship (1990)
- Arts Council of New Zealand Scholarship in Letters (1993)
- Hawthornden Writing fellowship, Scotland (1994)
- Buddle Findlay Sargeson Writing Fellowship, Auckland (1996)
- Auckland University Literary Fellowship (1996)
- Ucross Foundation Residency, Wyoming, United States (1997)
- Millay Arts Centre Residency, New York State, United States (2001)
- New Zealand Society of Authors Foxton Fellowship (2004)

== Selected works ==
=== Novels ===
- A Gap in the Spectrum (1959)
- The Matchbox House (1960)
- A Barbarous Tongue (1963)
- Over the Fence Is Out (1969)
- Disorderly Conduct (1984)
- Married Alive (1985)
- Rest for the Wicked (1986)
- Pulling Faces (1987)
- A Message from Harpo (1989)
- Unlawful Entry (1992)
- Seeing Red (1993)
- Leather Wings (1995)
- Studmuffin (1997)
- Swallowing Diamonds (2003)
- Playing Friends (2007)

=== Other works ===
- Other Lovers' Children: Poems 1958–74 (1975)
- Explosions in the Sun (1989), a volume of short stories
- Fooling (1994), a novella
- Cherries on a Plate: New Zealand Writers Talk About Their Sisters (1996) (editor)
- Camping on the Faultline (2000), a memoir
- The Chiming Blue: New and Selected Poems (Te Herenga Waka University Press, 2017)

=== Plays broadcast on radio ===
- A Gap in the Spectrum (adaptation of the novel, Radio New Zealand) (1972)
- A Barbarous Tongue (adaptation of the novel, Radio New Zealand) (1973)
- Home to Mother (Radio New Zealand) (1976)
- Feet First (Radio New Zealand) (1981)

=== Television scripts ===
- Close to Home scripts; 5 for Television One in 1975–1976

== Bibliography ==
- Sturm, Terry (1991). The Oxford history of New Zealand literature in English. Auckland, N.Z.: Oxford University Press. ISBN 0-19-558211-X. OCLC 24378310.
