= Gregory O'Brien =

New Zealand poet, painter and editor

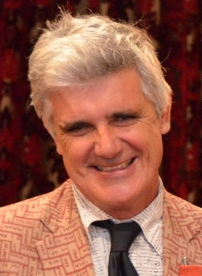
O'Brien in 2014

Gregory Leo O’Brien MNZM (born 1961) is a New Zealand poet, painter, author and editor. He is also an art curator and writes art history and criticism for both adults and children.

== Life ==
Born in Matamata in 1961, O'Brien trained as a journalist in Auckland and worked as a newspaper reporter in Northland. He graduated from the University of Auckland.

He lives in Wellington, and is married to poet Jenny Bornholdt.

== Awards and honours ==
- 1988 Sargeson Fellowship
- 1995 Victoria University Writing Fellow
- 1997 Landfall Essay Competition
- 1997 Montana New Zealand Book Award for Poetry
- 2005 LIANZA Elsie Locke Non-Fiction Award
- 2008 Montana New Zealand Book Award for Reference and Anthology
- 2024 Ockham New Zealand Book Award for Illustrated Fiction for Don Binney: Flight Path

In 2012 O'Brien received the Prime Minister's Awards for Literary Achievement, and became an Arts Foundation Laureate. In the 2014 New Year Honours, he was appointed a Member of the New Zealand Order of Merit, for services to the arts and in 2017 received an honorary doctorate of literature from Victoria University of Wellington.

== Works ==
=== Poetry and poetry collections and prose writing ===
- "Rocks, Te Namu Pa, Taranaki"; "Untitled"; "Beausoleil", "European", Shearsman 59
- "Printmaking Studio of John Drawbridge, Island Bay, Wellington", Shearsman 67/68
- "Wet Jacket Arm", Jacket 35, Early 2008
- Location of the Least Person (Auckland University Press, 1987)
- Dunes and Barns (1988)
- Man with a Child’s Violin (1990)
- Great Lake (Sydney, 1991)
- Malachi, a charming verse novella (Adelaide, 1993)
- Days Beside Water, (Auckland University Press, 1993)
- Winter I Was (Victoria University Press, 1999)
- Afternoon of an Evening Train (Victoria University Press, Wellington, 2005)
- News of the Swimmer Reaches Shore (Carcanet Press, Manchester, 2007)
- Beauties of the Octagonal Pool (Auckland University Press, 2012)
- Whale Years (Auckland University Press, 2015)
- Always song in the water (Auckland University Press, 2019)
- House and Contents (Auckland University Press, 2022)

His poetry has also appeared in many anthologies including Islands, Landfall, Sport, Meanjin and Scripsi, and in Vincent O'Sullivan, ed. (1987). An Anthology of twentieth century New Zealand poetry. Oxford University Press. ISBN 978-0-19-558163-8. His poetry has frequently been set to music by New Zealand composers.

=== Novel ===
- Diesel Mystic (Auckland University Press, 1989)

=== Anthologies ===
- Jenny Bornholdt; Gregory O'Brien; Mark Williams, eds. (1997). An anthology of New Zealand poetry in English. Oxford University Press New Zealand. ISBN 978-0-19-558338-0.
- Welcome to the South Seas. Contemporary New Zealand Art for Young People (Auckland University Press, 2004)
- Back and Beyond: New Zealand painting for the young and curious (Auckland University Press, 2008)
- See What I can See: New Zealand photography for the young and curious (Auckland University Press, 2015)

=== Art History and Criticism ===
- "Running Dog The Poetry of Ken Bolton", Sport 16: Autumn 1996
- Lands and Deeds: Profiles of Contemporary New Zealand Painters (Godwit Publishing, 1996)
- After Bathing At Baxter's, Victoria University Press, 2002.
- Parihaka: The Art of Passive Resistance (Victoria University Press, 2005) (co-editor)
- A Nest of Singing Birds: 100 Years of the New Zealand School Journal (Learning Media Ltd, Wellington, New Zealand, 2007)
- A Micronaut in the Wide World: The Imaginative Life and Times of Graham Percy (Auckland University Press, 2011)
- His Own Stream: The Work of Barry Brickell (Auckland University Press, 2012)
- Don Binney: Flight Path (Auckland University Press, 2023)

O'Brien also appeared regularly on Kim Hill's Radio New Zealand show to talk about poetry.

=== Art works ===
O'Brien regularly exhibits his work, and his art is included in many of the major art collections of New Zealand, including the Alexander Turnbull Library, Wellingtons, the Hocken Library, the Ministry of Foreign Affairs collection; the University of Auckland Art Collection and the Chartwell Collection.

He also illustrates the work of other authors for books and book covers.
