= Ian Wedde =

New Zealand writer and poet

Ian Wedde ONZM
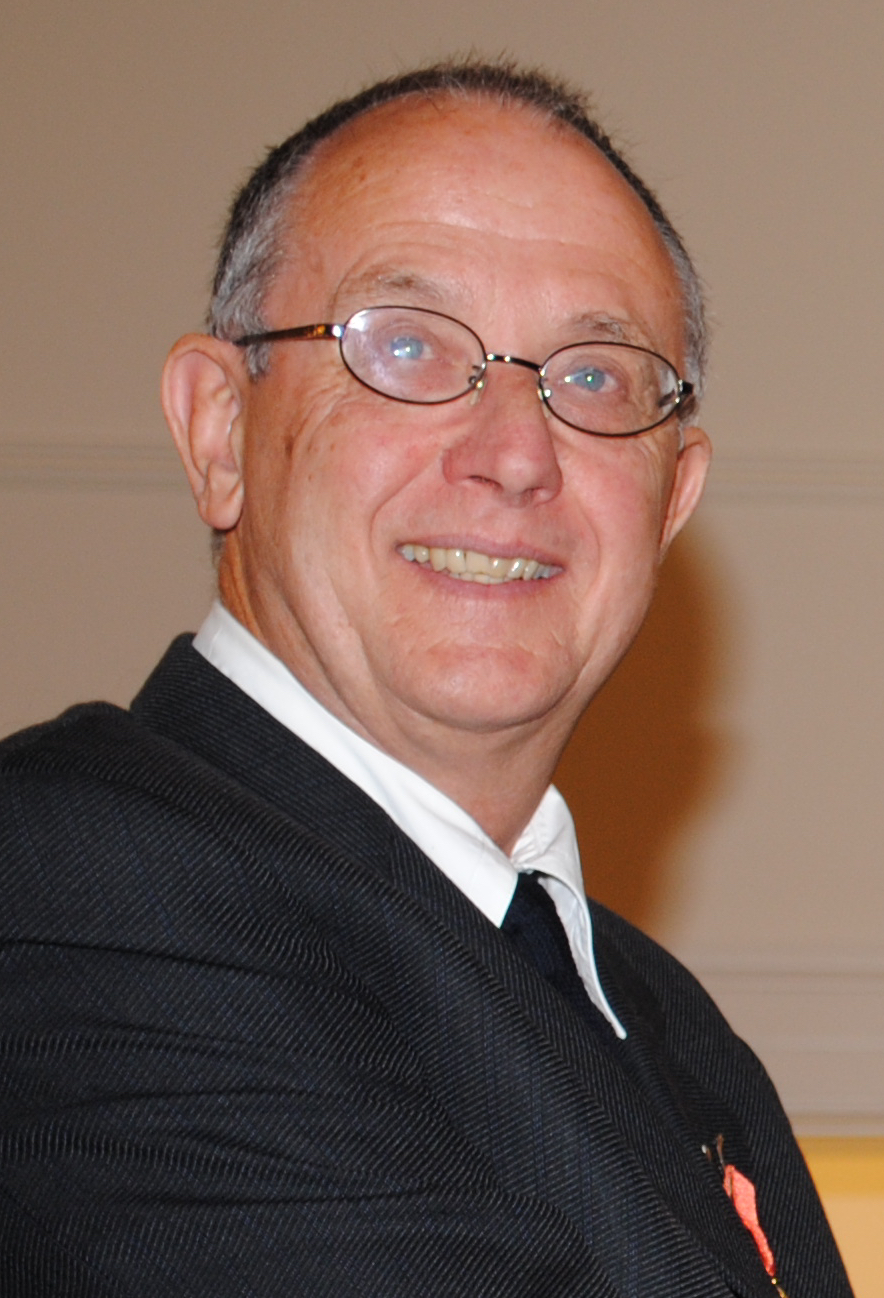
- Wedde in 2010
- Born: Ian Curtis Wedde; 17 October 1946 (age 79); Blenheim, New Zealand
- Education: University of Auckland
- Occupation: Poet
- Spouse: Rose Beauchamp (m. 1967) Donna Malane (m. 2007)

Ian Curtis Wedde ONZM (born 17 October 1946) is a New Zealand poet, fiction writer, critic, and art curator.

== Biography ==
Born in Blenheim, New Zealand, Wedde lived in East Pakistan and England as a child before returning to New Zealand. He attended King's College and the University of Auckland, graduating with an MA in English in 1968.

Wedde started publishing poetry in 1966. He travelled in Jordan and England in the late 1960s and early 1970s, and returned to New Zealand to live in Port Chalmers in 1972. In 1975 he moved to Wellington.

From 1983 to 1990 Wedde was the art critic for The Evening Post. He co-edited The Penguin Book of New Zealand Verse with Harvey McQueen in the mid 1980s, and The Penguin Book of Contemporary New Zealand Poetry with McQueen and Miriama Evans in 1989. He became the arts project manager at Te Papa in 1994 where he curated the opening art exhibition Parade that controversially paired McCahon's Northland Panels with a 1950s refrigerator.

A collection of essays, Making Ends Meet, was published in 2005.

Wedde was appointed an Officer of the New Zealand Order of Merit in the 2010 Queen's Birthday Honours, for services to art and literature.

In August 2011, Wedde was appointed New Zealand Poet Laureate for 2011-2013.

== Poetry collections ==
- 1971: Homage to Matisse
- 1974: Made Over
- 1975: Pathway to the Sea
- 1975: Earthly: Sonnets for Carlos
- 1977: Spells for Coming Out
- 1980: Castally: Poems 1973–1977
- 1984: Tales of Gotham City
- 1984: Georgicon
- 1987: Driving into the Storm: Selected Poems
- 1988: Tendering
- 1993: The Drummer
- 2001: The Commonplace Odes
- 2005: Three Regrets and A Hymn to Beauty
- 2009: Good Business
- 2013: The Lifeguard: Poems 2008-2013
- 2017: Selected Poems

== Fiction ==
- 1976: Dick Seddon’s Great Dive, winner of the Book Award for Fiction in 1977
- 1981: The Shirt Factory and Other Stories
- 1986: Symmes Hole
- 1988: Survival Arts
- 2005: Chinese Opera
- 2006: The Viewing Platform
- 2020: The Reed Warbler

== Notes ==
Cultural offices
Preceded by Cilla McQueen	New Zealand Poet Laureate; 2011–2013	Succeeded by Vincent O'Sullivan
