= Ockham New Zealand Book Awards =

New Zealand literary awards

- Country: New Zealand
- Presented by: New Zealand Book Awards Trust
- First award: 1996
- Website: Official website

The Ockham New Zealand Book Awards are literary awards presented annually in New Zealand. The awards began in 1996 as the merger of two literary awards events: the New Zealand Book Awards, which ran from 1976 to 1995, and the Goodman Fielder Wattie Book Awards, which ran from 1968 to 1995 (known as the Montana Book Awards from 1994 to 1995).

The awards have changed name several times depending on sponsorship. From 1996 to 2009, the awards were known as the Montana New Zealand Book Awards, and sponsored by Montana Wines. From 2010 until 2014, the awards were known as the New Zealand Post Book Awards. Since 2015, the main sponsors have been property developer Ockham Residential, the Acorn Foundation, Creative New Zealand, Mary and Peter Biggs, Booksellers Aotearoa New Zealand and biotech company MitoQ. The awards event is the opening event of the Auckland Writers Festival, held annually in May.

== History and format ==
Before 1996 there were two major New Zealand literary awards events: the Goodman Fielder Wattie Book Awards (1968 to 1995, known as the Montana Book Awards from 1994 to 1995) and the New Zealand Book Awards (1976 to 1995).

The Wattie Book of the Year Award (named for Sir James Wattie) was formed in 1968, supported by the New Zealand Publishers Association and sponsored by the company Wattie's. This award was the first of its kind in New Zealand. The first recipients were John Morton and Michael Miller for The New Zealand Sea Shore. The first novel to win an award was Smith's Dream by C.K. Stead in 1972. The award became the Goodman Fielder Wattie Awards, and only had a single category covering fiction, non-fiction and other genres. In 1994 the winemaking company Montana became the sponsor and the awards were renamed to the Montana Book Awards.

The New Zealand Book Awards were set up by the New Zealand Literary Fund, a government organisation, in 1976. Annual awards were presented for literary merit in fiction, non-fiction, poetry and (later) book production.

In 1996, the two award series were amalgamated to form the Montana New Zealand Book Awards, managed by Booksellers New Zealand (a bookselling association) and offering prizes in six categories. In 2010, the New Zealand Post took over as sponsor, having supported the New Zealand Book Awards for Children and Young Adults for the previous 14 years.

In 2015, Auckland property development firm Ockham Residential assumed sponsorship of the awards, and the New Zealand Book Awards Trust took over the governance and management. No prizes were presented in that year, and the awards were streamlined to discontinue the Book of the Year Award, the Booksellers' Choice Award and the People's Choice Award. Since the first Ockham New Zealand Book Awards in 2016, the ceremony has been held each year in May, as part of the Auckland Writers Festival. In 2020 the award winners were announced in a virtual presentation, after the Auckland Writers Festival was cancelled due to the COVID-19 pandemic.

As of 2021, there are five principal prizes: fiction (currently known as the Jann Medlicott Acorn Prize for Fiction), general non-fiction (sponsored by Royal Society Te Apārangi), illustrated non-fiction, poetry (currently known as the Mary and Peter Biggs Award for Poetry) and Te Mūrau o te Tuhi Māori Language Award for books written entirely in te reo Māori. "Best First Book" prizes are awarded to first time authors in the first four categories, currently sponsored by MitoQ. Each category is judged by a panel of three judges. Winners of the Jann Medlicott Acorn Prize for Fiction receive a minimum of NZ$55,000, and is the largest cash book prize in New Zealand. The other principal prizewinners receive NZ$10,000 each, and the winners of the four MitoQ Best First Book awards receive NZ$2,500.

== Fiction ==
=== Fiction award ===
Since 2020, the top prize for fiction has been the Jann Medlicott Acorn Prize for Fiction. Between 2017 and 2019, the top prize for fiction was known as the Acorn Foundation Fiction Prize. In 2017, it was known as the Acorn Foundation Literary Award. From 1996 to 2016, it was known as the Fiction Prize.

- 2026 – Ingrid Horrocks, All Her Lives. Te Herenga Waka University Press
- 2025 – Damien Wilkins, Delirious. Te Herenga Waka University Press
- 2024 – Emily Perkins, Lioness. Bloomsbury UK.
- 2023 – Catherine Chidgey, The Axeman's Carnival. Te Herenga Waka University Press
- 2022 – Whiti Hereaka, Kurangaituku. Huia Publishers
- 2021 – Airini Beautrais, Bug Week & Other Stories. Victoria University Press
- 2020 – Becky Manawatu, Auē. Mākaro Press
- 2019 – Fiona Kidman, This Mortal Boy. Vintage, Penguin Random House
- 2018 – Pip Adam, The New Animals. Victoria University Press
- 2017 – Catherine Chidgey, The Wish Child. Victoria University Press
- 2016 – Stephen Daisley, Coming Rain. Text Publishing
- 2015 – no award due to change of sponsors
- 2014 – Eleanor Catton, The Luminaries. Victoria University Press
- 2013 – Kirsty Gunn, The Big Music. Faber and Faber
- 2012 – Paula Morris, Rangatira. Penguin Group (NZ)
- 2011 – Laurence Fearnley, The Hut Builder. Penguin Group (NZ)
- 2010 – Alison Wong, As the Earth Turns Silver. Penguin Group (NZ)
- 2009 – Emily Perkins, A Novel About My Wife. Bloomsbury
- 2008 – Charlotte Grimshaw, Opportunity. Random House NZ
- 2007 – Lloyd Jones, Mister Pip. Penguin
- 2006 – Maurice Gee, Blindsight. Penguin
- 2005 – Patricia Grace, Tu. Penguin Group (NZ)
- 2004 – Annamarie Jagose, Slow Water. Victoria University Press
- 2003 – Stephanie Johnson, The Shag Incident. Vintage Books
- 2002 – Craig Marriner, Stonedogs. Vintage Books
- 2001 – Lloyd Jones, The Book of Fame. Penguin Group (NZ)
- 2000 – Owen Marshall, Harlequin Rex. Vintage
- 1999 – Elizabeth Knox, The Vintner's Luck. Victoria University Press
- 1998 – Maurice Gee, Live Bodies. Penguin Group (NZ)
- 1997 – Alan Duff, What Becomes of the Broken Hearted?. Vintage
- 1996 – Sheridan Keith, Zoology: A Novel. Penguin

=== Best first book award (fiction) ===
Since 2022 and between 2015 and 2018, this award has been known as the Hubert Church Best First Book Award for Fiction. From 2019 to 2021, this award was known as the MitoQ Best First Book Awards: Hubert Church Prize for Fiction. From 1997 to 2014, this award was known as the NZSA Hubert Church Best First Book of Fiction Prize. In 1996, this award was known as the Best First Book Award, Fiction. Prior to 1996, this award had been presented since 1945 by PEN NZ, and was named for the poet, novelist and critic Hubert Church.

- 2026 – John Prins, Pastoral Care. Otago University Press
- 2025 – Michelle Rahurahu, Poorhara. Te Herenga Waka University Press
- 2024 – Emma Hislop, Ruin and Other Stories. Te Herenga Waka University Press
- 2023 – Anthony Lapwood. Home Theatre. Te Herenga Waka University Press
- 2022 – Rebecca K Reilly, Greta & Valdin. Te Herenga Waka University Press
- 2021 – Rachel Kerr, Victory Park. Mākaro Press
- 2020 – Becky Manawatu, Auē. Mākaro Press
- 2019 – Kirsten Warner, The Sound of Breaking Glass. Mākaro Press
- 2018 – Annaleese Jochems, Baby. Victoria University Press
- 2017 – Gina Cole, Black Ice Matter. Huia Publishers
- 2016 – David Coventry, The Invisible Mile. Victoria University Press
- 2015 – no award due to change of sponsors
- 2014 – Amy Head, Tough. Victoria University Press
- 2013 – Lawrence Patchett, I Got His Blood on Me. Victoria University Press
- 2012 – Hamish Clayton, Wulf. Penguin Group (NZ)
- 2011 – Pip Adam, Everything We Hoped for. Victoria University Press
- 2010 – Anna Taylor, Relief. Victoria University Press
- 2009 – Eleanor Catton, The Rehearsal. Victoria University Press
- 2008 – Mary McCallum, The Blue. Penguin Group (NZ)
- 2007 – Rachael King, The Sound of Butterflies. Black Swan
- 2006 – Gillian Ranstead, A Red Silk Sea. Penguin Group (NZ)
- 2005 – Julian Novitz, My Real Life and Other Stories. Vintage
- 2004 – Kelly Ana Morey, Bloom. Penguin Group (NZ)
- 2003 – Paula Morris Queen of Beauty. Penguin Group (NZ)
- 2002 – Craig Marriner, Stonedogs. Vintage Books
- 2001 – Karyn Hay, Emerald Budgies. Vintage Books
- 2000 – Duncan Sarkies, Stray Thoughts And Nosebleeds. Victoria University Press
- 1999 – William Brandt, Alpha Male. Victoria University Press
- 1998 – Catherine Chidgey, In a Fishbone Church. Victoria University Press
- 1997 – Dominic Sheehan, Finding Home. Secker & Waburg
- 1996 – Emily Perkins, Not Her Real Name. Victoria University Press

== Poetry ==
=== Poetry award ===
Since 2020, this award has been the Mary and Peter Biggs Award for Poetry. Before 2019, this award was known as the Poetry Award.

- 2026 – Nafanua Purcell Kersel, Black Sugarcane. Te Herenga Waka University Press
- 2025 – Emma Neale, Liar, Liar, Lick, Spit, Otago University Press
- 2024 – Grace Yee, Chinese Fish Giramondo
- 2023 – Alice Te Punga Somerville, Always Italicise: How to Write While Colonised. Auckland University Press
- 2022 – Joanna Preston, Tumble. Otago University Press
- 2021 – Tusiata Avia, The Savage Coloniser Book. Victoria University Press
- 2020 – Helen Rickerby, How to Live. Auckland University Press
- 2019 – Helen Heath, Are Friends Electric?. Victoria University Press
- 2018 – Elizabeth Smither, Night Horse. Auckland University Press
- 2017 – Andrew Johnston, Fits & Starts. Victoria University Press
- 2016 – David Eggleton, The Conch Trumpet. Otago University Press
- 2015 – no award due to change of sponsors
- 2014 – Vincent O'Sullivan, Us, Then. Victoria University Press
- 2013 – Anne Kennedy, The Darling North. Auckland University Press
- 2012 – Rhian Gallagher, Shift. Auckland University Press
- 2011 – Kate Camp, The Mirror of Simple Annihilated Souls. Victoria University Press
- 2010 – Brian Turner, Just This. Victoria University Press
- 2009 – Jenny Bornholdt, The Rocky Shore. Victoria University Press
- 2008 – Janet Charman, Cold Snack. Auckland University Press
- 2007 – Janet Frame, The Goose Bath. Vintage
- 2006 – Bill Manhire, Lifted. Victoria University Press
- 2005 – Vincent O'Sullivan, Nice Morning for It, Adam. Victoria University Press
- 2004 – Anne Kennedy, Sing-song. Auckland University Press
- 2003 – Glenn Colquhoun, Playing God. Steele Roberts
- 2002 – Hone Tuwhare, Piggy-back Moon. Godwit
- 2001 – Allen Curnow, The Bells of St Babel's. Auckland University Press
- 2000 – Elizabeth Smither, The Lark Quartet. Auckland University Press
- 1999 – Vincent O'Sullivan, Seeing You Asked. Victoria University Press
- 1998 – Hone Tuwhare, Shape-Shifter. Steele Roberts
- 1997 – edited by Jenny Bornholdt, Gregory O'Brien and Mark Williams, An Anthology of New Zealand Poetry in English. Oxford University Press
- 1996 – Bill Manhire, My Sunshine. Victoria University Press

=== Best first book award (poetry) ===
Since 2022 and between 2015 and 2018, this award has been known as the Jessie Mackay Best First Book Award for Poetry. Between 2019 and 2021, this award was known as the MitoQ Best First Book Awards: Jessie Mackay Prize for Poetry. From 1997 to 2014, this award was known as the NZSA Jessie Mackay Best First Book of Poetry Prize. In 1996, this award was known as the Best First Book Award, Poetry. Prior to 1996, this award had been presented since 1940 by PEN NZ, and was named for Jessie Mackay, New Zealand's first local-born poet.

- 2026 – Sophie van Waardenberg, No Good. Auckland University Press
- 2025 – Rex Letoa Paget, Manuali'i. Saufo'i Press
- 2024 – Megan Kitching, At the Point of Seeing. Otago University Press
- 2023 – Khadro Mohamed, We're All Made of Lightning. Tender Press
- 2022 – Nicole Titihuia Hawkins, Whai. We Are Babies Press
- 2021 – Jackson Nieuwland, I Am a Human Being. Compound Press
- 2020 – Jane Arthur, Craven. Victoria University Press
- 2019 – Tayi Tibble, Poūkahangatus. Victoria University Press
- 2018 – Hannah Mettner, Fully Clothed and So Forgetful. Victoria University Press
- 2017 – Hera Lindsay Bird, Hera Lindsay Bird. Victoria University Press
- 2016 – Chris Tse, How to be Dead in a Year of Snakes. Auckland University Press
- 2015 – no award due to change of sponsors
- 2014 – Marty Smith, Horse with Hat. Victoria University Press
- 2013 – Helen Heath, Graft. Victoria University Press
- 2012 – John Adams, Briefcase. Auckland University Press
- 2011 – Lynn Jenner, Dear Sweet Harry. Auckland University Press
- 2010 – Selina Tusitala Marsh, Fast Talking PI. Auckland University Press
- 2009 – Sam Sampson, Everything Talks. Auckland University Press
- 2008 – Jessica Le Bas, Incognito. Auckland University Press
- 2007 – Airini Beautrais, Secret Heart. Victoria University Press
- 2006 – Karlo Mila, Dream Fish Floating. Huia Publishers
- 2005 – Sonja Yelich, Clung. Auckland University Press
- 2004 – Cliff Fell, The Adulterer's Bible. Victoria University Press
- 2003 – Kay McKenzie Cooke, Feeding the Dogs, Kay McKenzie Cooke. University of Otago Press
- 2002 – Chris Price, Husk. Auckland University Press
- 2001 – Stephanie de Montalk, Animals Indoors. Victoria University Press
- 2000 – Glenn Colquhoun, The Art of Walking Upright. Steele Roberts
- 1999 – Kate Camp, Unfamiliar Legends of the Stars. Victoria University Press
- 1998 – Kapka Kassabova, All Roads Lead to the Sea. Auckland University Press
- 1997 – Diane Brown, Before the Divorce We Go To Disneyland. Tandem Press
- 1996 – James Brown, Go Round Power Please. Victoria University Press

== General non-fiction ==
=== General non-fiction award ===
Since 2020, the top prize for general non-fiction has been the General Non-Fiction Award. Between 2016 and 2019, this award was known as the Royal Society Te Apārangi Award. Between 2010 and 2015, this award was known as the General Non-Fiction Prize. Between 1998 and 2009, the top prize for non-fiction was the Montana Medal for Non-Fiction. There was no top prize for general non-fiction in 1996 or 1997.

- 2026 – Tina Makereti, This Compulsion in Us. Te Herenga Waka University Press
- 2025 – Ngāhuia Te Awekōtuku, Hine Toa: A Story of Bravery, HarperCollins Publishers
- 2024 – Damon Salesa, An Indigenous Ocean: Pacific Essays. Bridget Williams Books
- 2023 – Ned Fletcher, The English Text of the Treaty of Waitangi. Bridget Williams Books
- 2022 – Vincent O'Malley, Voices from the New Zealand Wars | He Reo nō ngā Pakanga o Aotearoa. Bridget Williams Books
- 2021 – Vincent O'Sullivan, The Dark is Light Enough: Ralph Hotere: A Biographical Portrait. Penguin
- 2020 – Shayne Carter, Dead People I Have Known. Victoria University Press
- 2019 – Joanne Drayton, Hudson & Halls: The Food of Love. Otago University Press
- 2018 – Diana Wichtel, Driving to Treblinka: A Long Search for a Lost Father. Awa Press
- 2017 – Ashleigh Young, Can You Tolerate This? Victoria University Press
- 2016 – Witi Ihimaera, Māori Boy: A Memoir of Childhood. Vintage
- 2015 – no award due to change of sponsors
- 2014 – Jill Trevelyan, Peter McLeavey: The life and times of a New Zealand art dealer. Te Papa Press
- 2013 – Steve Braunias, Civilisation: Twenty Places on the Edge of the World. Awa Press
- 2012 – Joan Druett, Tupaia: The Remarkable Story of Captain Cook's Polynesian Navigator. Random House NZ
- 2011 – Chris Bourke, Blue Smoke: The Lost Dawn of New Zealand Popular Music 1918–1964. Auckland University Press
- 2010 – Judith Binney, Encircled Lands: Te Urewera, 1820–1921. Bridget Williams Books
- 2009 – Jill Trevelyan, Rita Angus: An Artist's Life. Te Papa Press
- 2008 – Janet Hunt, Wetlands of New Zealand. Random House NZ
- 2007 – Audrey Eagle, Eagle's Complete Trees and Shrubs of New Zealand. Te Papa Press
- 2006 – Philip Simpson, Pōhutukawa & Rātā: New Zealand's Iron-hearted Trees. Te Papa Press
- 2005 – Douglas Lloyd Jenkins, At Home: A Century of New Zealand Design. Godwit Press
- 2004 – Anne Salmond, The Trial of the Cannibal Dog. Allen Lane / Penguin Group (NZ)
- 2003 – Michael Cooper, Wine Atlas of New Zealand. Hodder Moa Beckett
- 2002 – Lynley Hood, A City Possessed: The Christchurch Civic Creche Case. Longacre Press
- 2001 – Michael King, Wrestling with the Angel: A Life of Janet Frame. Viking Press
- 2000 – Grahame Sydney, The Art of Grahame Sydney. Longacre Press
- 1999 – Heather Nicholson, The Loving Stitch: A history of knitting and spinning in New Zealand. Auckland University Press
- 1998 – Harry Orsman, Dictionary of New Zealand English: A Dictionary of New Zealandisms on Historical Principles. Oxford University Press

=== Best first book award (general non-fiction) ===
Since 2022 and between 2015 and 2018, this award has been known as the E H McCormick Best First Book Award for General Non-Fiction. Between 2019 and 2021, this award was known as the MitoQ Best First Book Awards: E H McCormick Prize for General Non-Fiction. From 1997 to 2014, this award was known as the NZSA E.H. McCormick Best First Book of Non-Fiction Prize. In 1996, this award was known as the Best First Book Award, Non-Fiction. The award is named for New Zealand historian and biographer Eric Hall McCormick.

- 2026 – Jacinda Ardern, A Different Kind of Power. Penguin, Penguin Random House
- 2025 – Una Cruickshank, The Chthonic Cycle. Te Herenga Waka University Press
- 2024 – Emma Wehipeihana, There's a Cure for This. Penguin Random House
- 2023 – Noelle McCarthy, Grand: Becoming my Mother's Daughter. Penguin Random House
- 2022 – Dave Lowe, The Alarmist: Fifty Years Measuring Climate Change. Te Herenga Waka University Press
- 2021 – Madison Hamill, Specimen: Personal Essays. Victoria University Press
- 2020 – Shayne Carter, Dead People I Have Known. Victoria University Press
- 2019 – Chessie Henry, We Can Make a Life. Victoria University Press
- 2018 – Diana Wichtel, Driving to Treblinka: A Long Search for a Lost Father. Awa Press
- 2017 – Adam Dudding, My Father's Island. Victoria University Press
- 2016 – Melissa Williams, Panguru and the City, Kāinga Tahi, Kāinga Rua: An Urban Migration History. Bridget Williams Books
- 2015 – no award due to change of sponsors
- 2014 – Rebecca Macfie, Tragedy at Pike River Mine. Awa Press
- 2013 – Quinn Berentson, Moa: The Life and Death of New Zealand's Legendary Bird. Craig Potton Publishing
- 2012 – Michael Smythe, New Zealand by Design. Random House NZ
- 2011 – Poia Rewi, Whaikōrero: The World of Māori Oratory. Auckland University Press
- 2010 – Pip Desmond, Trust: A True Story of Women & Gangs. Random House NZ
- 2009 – Chris Brickell, Mates & Lovers: A History of Gay New Zealand. Godwit Press
- 2008 – Alan Clarke, The Great Sacred Forest of Tane. Raupo Publishing
- 2007 – William Cottrell, Furniture of the New Zealand Colonial Era: An Illustrated History 1830–1900. Reed Publishing
- 2006 – Patrick Snedden, Pakeha and the Treaty: Why It's Our Treaty Too. Random House NZ
- 2005 – Douglas Wright, Ghost Dance. Penguin Group (NZ)
- 2004 – Deidre Brown, Tai Tokerau Whakairo Rakau: Northland Maori Wood Carving. Reed Publishing
- 2003 – Sam Mahon, Year of the Horse. Longacre Press
- 2002 – Steve Braunias, Fool's Paradise. Random House
- 2001 – Paul Tapsell, Pukaki: A Comet Returns. Reed Publishing
- 2000 – Peter Thomson, Kava in the Blood. Tandem Press
- 1999 – Helen Schamroth, 100 New Zealand Craft Artists. Godwit Press
- 1998 – Genevieve Noser, Olives: the New Passion. Penguin Group (NZ)
- 1997 – Jessie Munro, The Story of Suzanne Aubert. Auckland University Press/Bridget Williams Books
- 1996 – Alex Frame, Salmond: Southern Jurist. Victoria University Press

== Illustrated non-fiction ==
=== Illustrated non-fiction award ===
Since 2025, this award has been known as the Bookhub Award for Illustrated Non-Fiction. From 2021 to 2024, this award was known as the Booksellers Aotearoa New Zealand Award for Illustrated Non-Fiction. From 2004 to 2020, this award was known as the Illustrated Non-Fiction Award. From 1996 to 2003, this award was known as the Illustrative Arts Award.

- 2026 – Elizabeth Cox, Mr Ward’s Map: Victorian Wellington Street by Street. Massey University Press
- 2025 – Deidre Brown, Ngarino Ellis and Jonathan Mane-Wheoki, Toi Te Mana: An Indigenous History of Māori Art. Auckland University Press
- 2024 – Gregory O'Brien, Don Binney: Flight Path. Auckland University Press
- 2023 – Nick Bollinger, Jumping Sundays: The Rise and Fall of the Counterculture in Aotearoa New Zealand. Auckland University Press.
- 2022 – Claire Regnault, Dressed: Fashionable Dress in Aotearoa New Zealand 1840 to 1910. Te Papa Press
- 2021 – Monique Fiso, Hiakai: Modern Māori Cuisine. Godwit Press
- 2020 – edited by Stephanie Gibson, Matariki Williams and Puawai Cairns, Protest Tautohetohe: Objects of Resistance, Persistence and Defiance. Te Papa Press
- 2019 – Sean Mallon and Sébastien Galliot, Tatau: A History of Sāmoan Tattooing. Te Papa Press
- 2018 – Alison Jones and Kuni Kaa Jenkins, Tuai: A Traveller in Two Worlds. Bridget Williams Books
- 2017 – Barbara Brookes, A History of New Zealand Women. Bridget Williams Books
- 2016 – Atholl Anderson, Judith Binney and Aroha Harris, Tangata Whenua: An Illustrated History. Bridget Williams Books
- 2015 – no award due to change of sponsors
- 2014 – Bruce Ansley & Jane Ussher, Coast: A New Zealand Journey. Godwit Press
- 2013 – Gregory O'Brien & Gil Hanly, Pat Hanly. Ron Sang Publications
- 2012 – John Dawson and Rob Lucas, New Zealand's Native Trees. Craig Potton Publishing
- 2011 – Damian Skinner, The Passing World: The Passage of Life: John Hovell and the Art of Kowhaiwhai. Rim Books
- 2010 – Al Brown, Go Fish: Recipes and stories from the New Zealand Coast. Random House NZ
- 2009 – Len Castle, Len Castle: Making the Molecules Dance. Lopdell House Gallery
- 2008 – Jennifer Hay, with Ron Brownson, Chris Knox, and Laurence Aberhart; designed by Aaron Beehre, Bill Hammond: Jingle Jangle Morning. Christchurch Art Gallery
- 2007 – Audrey Eagle, Eagles Complete Trees and Shrubs of New Zealand. Te Papa Press
- 2006 – Edited by Hannah Holm & Lara Strongman, Contemporary New Zealand Photographers. Vintage
- 2005 – Luit Bieringa, Handboek: Ans Westra Photographs. BWX
- 2004 – Arno Gasteiger, Central. Viking Press
- 2003 – Nancy Pel & Len Castle, Len Castle: Potter. Ron Sang Publications
- 2002 – Joan Whincup & Tony Whincup with Julia Parkinson (designer), Akekeia! Traditional Dance in Kiribati. Susan Barrie
- 2001 – Edited by Ian Wedde, Ralph Hotere: Black Light. Te Papa Press & Dunedin Public Art Gallery
- 2000 – Grahame Sydney, The Art of Grahame Sydney. Longacre Press
- 1999 – Helen Schamroth, 100 New Zealand Craft Artists. Godwit Press
- 1998 – Roger Blackley, Goldie. David Bateman
- 1997 – edited by Sandy Adsett, Cliff Whiting and Witi Ihimaera, Mataora: The Living Face: Contemporary Maori Art. David Bateman
- 1996 – Winsome Shepherd, Gold and Silversmithing in Nineteenth and Twentieth Century New Zealand. Museum of New Zealand

=== Best first book award (illustrated non-fiction) ===
Since 2022, this award has been known as the Judith Binney Prize for Illustrated Non-Fiction. Between 2019 and 2021, this award was known as the MitoQ Best First Book Awards: Judith Binney Prize for Illustrated Non-Fiction. From 2016 to 2018, this award was known as the Judith Binney Best First Book Award for Illustrated Non-Fiction. The award is named after the New Zealand historian Judith Binney.

- 2026 – Philip Garnock-Jones, He Puāwai: A Natural History of New Zealand Flowers. Auckland University Press
- 2025 – Kirsty Baker, Sight Lines: Women and Art in Aotearoa. Auckland University Press
- 2024 – Ryan Bodman, Rugby League in New Zealand: A People's History. Bridget Williams Books
- 2023 – Christall Lowe, Kai: Food Stories & Recipes from my Family Table. Bateman Books
- 2022 – Bridget Hackshaw, The Architect and the Artists: Hackshaw, McCahon, Dibble. Massey University Press
- 2021 – Monique Fiso, Hiakai: Modern Māori Cuisine. Godwit Press
- 2020 – Chris McDowall and Tim Denee, We Are Here: An Atlas of Aotearoa. Massey University Press
- 2019 – John Reid, Whatever it Takes: Pacific Films and John O’Shea 1948–2000. Victoria University Press
- 2018 – Marcus Thomas and Neil Silverwood, Caves: Exploring New Zealand's Subterranean Wilderness. Whio Publishing
- 2017 – Ngarino Ellis, A Whakapapa of Tradition: One Hundred Years of Ngāti Porou Carving, 1830–1930. Auckland University Press
- 2016 – Richard Nunns with Allan Thomas, Te Ara Puoro: A Journey into the World of Māori Music. Potton & Burton

== Māori Language Award ==
Books that meet the general criteria of the fiction, non-fiction and poetry awards and are written wholly and originally in te reo Māori are eligible for Te Mūrau o te Tuhi – Māori Language Award. This award is made at the discretion of a specially appointed judge. Prior to 2019, Māori language awards were presented in 2008, 2009, 2012 and 2013.

- 2026 – Pou Temara, Te Āhua o ngā Kupu Whakaari a Te Kooti. Auckland University Press
- 2024 – Pou Temara, Te Rautakitahi O Tūhoe ki Ōrākau. Auckland University Press
- 2021 – Tīmoti Kāretu, Mātāmua ko te Kupu!. Auckland University Press
- 2019 – Tīmoti Kāretu and Wharehuia Milroy, He Kupu Tuku Iho: Ko te Reo Māori te Tatau ki te Ao. Auckland University Press
- 2013 – Dame Kāterina Te Heikōkō Mataira, Ngā Waituhi o Rēhua. Huia Publishers
- 2012 – Chris Winitana, Tōku Reo, Tōku Ohooho : My Language, My Inspiration. Huia Publishers
- 2009 – Maori Language Commission, He Pātaka Kupu: Te Kai a te rangatira. Raupo Press
- 2008 – Edited by Huriana Raven and Piripi Walker, Te Tū a Te Toka: He Ieretanga nō ngā Tai e Whā. Totika Publishers and Toi Māori Aotearoa

== Discontinued awards ==
=== Top awards ===
==== Book of the year ====
There have been a number of "book of the year" awards in the history of the awards. The New Zealand Post Book of the Year was presented between 2010 and 2014, when New Zealand Post was the sponsor of the awards ceremony. The Montana Medal for Fiction or Poetry was presented in 2008 and 2009. The Deutz Medal for Fiction or Poetry was presented between 1998 and 2007. The Book of the Year/Cultural Heritage Award was presented in 1996 and 1997.

- 2014 – Jill Trevelyan, Peter McLeavey: The life and times of a New Zealand art dealer. Te Papa Press
- 2013 – Kirsty Gunn, The Big Music. Faber and Faber
- 2012 – John Dawson and Rob Lucas, New Zealand's Native Trees. Craig Potton Publishing
- 2011 – Chris Bourke, Blue Smoke: The Lost Dawn of New Zealand Popular Music 1918–1964. Auckland University Press
- 2010 – Judith Binney, Encircled Lands: Te Urewera, 1820–1921. Bridget Williams Books
- 2009 – Emily Perkins, A Novel About My Wife. Bloomsbury
- 2008 – Charlotte Grimshaw, Opportunity. Random House NZ
- 2007 – Lloyd Jones, Mister Pip. Penguin
- 2006 – Maurice Gee, Blindsight. Penguin
- 2005 – Patricia Grace, Tu. Penguin Group (NZ)
- 2004 – Annamarie Jagose, Slow Water. Victoria University Press
- 2003 – Stephanie Johnson, The Shag Incident. Vintage
- 2002 – Craig Marriner, Stonedogs. Vintage Books
- 2001 – Lloyd Jones, The Book of Fame. Penguin Group (NZ)
- 2000 – Owen Marshall, Harlequin Rex. Vintage
- 1999 – Elizabeth Knox, The Vintner's Luck. Victoria University Press
- 1998 – Maurice Gee, Live Bodies. Penguin Group (NZ)
- 1997 – Jessie Munro, The Story of Suzanne Aubert. Auckland University Press/Bridget Williams Books
- 1996 – Judith Binney, Redemption Songs – A Life of Te Kooti Arikirangi Te Turuki. Auckland University Press/Bridget Williams Books

==== People's choice award ====
The People's Choice Award was presented from 2010 to 2014. Before 2010, this award was known as the Readers' Choice Award. There were no people's choice awards in 1996 or 1997.

- 2014 – Eleanor Catton, The Luminaries. Victoria University Press
- 2013 – Jarrod Gilbert, Patched: The History of Gangs in New Zealand. Auckland University Press
- 2012 – Sue Orr, From Under the Overcoat. Vintage, Random House NZ
- 2011 – Chris Bourke, Blue Smoke: The Lost Dawn of New Zealand Popular Music 1918–1964. Auckland University Press
- 2010 – Al Brown, Go Fish: Recipes and stories from the New Zealand Coast. Random House NZ
- 2009 – Kate De Goldi, The 10 pm Question. Longacre Press
- 2008 – Mary McCallum, The Blue. Penguin Group (NZ)
- 2007 – Lloyd Jones, Mister Pip. Penguin
- 2006 (joint) – Maurice Gee, Blindsight. Penguin
- 2006 (joint) – Fiona Kidman, The Captive Wife. Vintage
- 2005 – Julie Le Clerc and John Bougen, Made in Morocco: A Journey of Exotic Tastes and Places. Penguin Group (NZ)
- 2004 – Michael King, The Penguin History of New Zealand. Penguin Group (NZ)
- 2003 – Glenn Colquhoun, Playing God. Steele Roberts
- 2002 – Lynley Hood, A City Possessed: The Christchurch Civic Creche Case. Longacre Press
- 2001 – Michael King, Wrestling with the Angel: A Life of Janet Frame. Viking Press
- 2000 – Grahame Sydney, The Art of Grahame Sydney. Longacre Press
- 1999 – Elizabeth Knox, The Vintner's Luck. Victoria University Press
- 1998 – Edited by Malcolm McKinnon, New Zealand Historical Atlas. David Bateman

==== Booksellers' choice award ====
The Nielsen Booksellers' Choice Award was only presented in 2013 and 2014.

- 2014 – Harry Broad & Rob Suisted, Molesworth: Stories from New Zealand's largest high country station. Craig Potton Publishing
- 2013 – Shaun Barnett, Rob Brown & Geoff Spearpoint, Shelter from the Storm: The story of New Zealand's backcountry huts. Craig Potton Publishing

==== Lifetime achievement award ====
The A W Reed Award for Contribution to New Zealand Literature Award was presented in 2004. From 2000 to 2002 this award was known as the A W Reed Lifetime Achievement Award.

- 2004 – Joy Cowley
- 2002 – Maurice Shadbolt
- 2001 – Dame Fiona Kidman
- 2000 – Allen Curnow

=== Non-fiction category awards ===
==== History ====
This award ended in 2009. Before 2001, a single award was given for History and Biography.

- 2009 – Richard Boast, Buying the Land, Selling the Land. Victoria University Press
- 2008 – Hilary Mitchell & John Mitchell, Te Tau Ihu o Te Waka Volume II: Te Ara Hou – The New Society. Huia Publishers
- 2007 – Edited by K.R. Howe, Vaka Moana: Voyages of the Ancestors. David Bateman
- 2006 – Rosemary McLeod, Thrift to Fantasy: Home Textile Crafts of the 1930s – 1950s. Vintage
- 2005 – Douglas Lloyd Jenkins, At Home: A Century of New Zealand Design. Godwit Press
- 2004 – Anne Salmond, The Trial of the Cannibal Dog. Allen Lane / Penguin Group (NZ)
- 2003 – Jim McAloon, No Idle Rich: The Wealthy in Canterbury & Otago 1840 – 1914. University of Otago Press
- 2002 – Lynley Hood, A City Possessed: The Christchurch Civic Creche Case. Longacre Press
- 2001 – Edited by Te Miringa Hohaia, Gregory O'Brien & Lara Strongman, Parihaka: The Art of Passive Resistance. City Gallery Wellington, Trustees of Parihaka Pa & Victoria University Press
- 2000 – Chris Maclean, Kapiti. The Whitcombe Press
- 1998 – Harry Orsman, Dictionary of New Zealand English: A Dictionary of New Zealandisms on Historical Principles. Oxford University Press

==== Biography ====
This award ended in 2009. Before 2001, a single award was given for History and Biography.

- 2009 – Jill Trevelyan, Rita Angus: An Artist's Life. Te Papa Press
- 2008 – Judy Siers, The Life and Times of James Walter Chapman-Taylor. Millwood Heritage Productions Ltd
- 2007 – Philip Norman, Douglas Lilburn: His Life and Music. Canterbury University Press
- 2006 – Graeme Dingle, Dingle. Vintage
- 2005 – Martin Edmond, Chronicle of the Unsung. Auckland University Press
- 2004 – Rachel Barrowman, Mason. Victoria University Press
- 2003 – Philip Temple, A Sort of Conscience: The Wakefields. Auckland University Press
- 2002 – Peter Wells, Long Loop Home. Vintage
- 2001 – Michael King, Wrestling with the Angel: A Life of Janet Frame. Viking Press
- 1999 – Kevin Ireland, Under the Bridge and Over the Moon. Vintage

==== Environment ====
The Environment award ended in 2009. From 1998 to 1999, this award was titled the Environment & Heritage Award. From 1996 to 1997, this award was titled the Natural Heritage Award.

- 2009 – edited by Ian J. Graham, A Continent on the Move: New Zealand Geoscience into the 21st Century. Geological Society of New Zealand
- 2008 – Janet Hunt, Wetlands of New Zealand. Random House NZ
- 2007 – George Gibbs, Ghosts of Gondwana. Craig Potton Publishing
- 2006 – Philip Simpson, Pōhutukawa & Rātā: New Zealand's Iron-hearted Trees. Vintage
- 2005 – Anne Rimmer, Tiritiri Matangi: A Model of Conservation. Tandem Press
- 2004 – Peter Batson, Deep New Zealand. Canterbury University Press
- 2003 – Geoff Chapple, Te Araroa: The New Zealand Trail. Random House NZ
- 2002 – Bob Harvey, Rolling Thunder: The Spirit of Karekare. Exisle Publishing
- 2001 – Philip Simpson, Dancing Leaves: The Story of New Zealand's Cabbage Tree. Canterbury University Press
- 2000 – Shaun Barnett & Rob Brown, Classic Tramping in New Zealand . Craig Potton Publishing
- 1999 – Gerard Hutching, The Natural World of New Zealand. Penguin Group (NZ)
- 1998 – Peter Johnson, Pick of the Bunch: New Zealand Wildflowers. Longacre Press
- 1997 – John Dawson, photography by Rob Lucas, New Zealand Coast and Mountain Plants: Their Communities and Lifestyles. Victoria University Press
- 1996 – Neville Peat and Brian Patrick, Wild Dunedin: The Natural History of New Zealand's Wildlife Capital. Otago University Press

==== Lifestyle & Contemporary Culture ====
The Lifestyle & Contemporary Choice award ended in 2009. From 2000 to 2001, this award was the Lifestyle Award. From 1998 to 1999, this award was the Lives & Lifestyle Award. From 1996 to 1997, this award was the Leisure & Lifestyle Award.

- 2009 – Alexa Johnston. Ladies, A Plate: Traditional Home Baking. Penguin Group (NZ)
- 2008 – Ngahuia Te Awekotuku, Mau Moko: The World of Maori Tattoo. Penguin Group (NZ)
- 2007 – Ann Packer, Stitch: Contemporary New Zealand Textile Artists. Random House
- 2006 – Justin Paton, How to Look at a Painting. Vintage
- 2005 – Gareth Shute, Hip Hop Music in Aotearoa. Reed Publishing
- 2004 – John Kent & David Hallett, Classic Fly Fishing. Craig Potton Publishing
- 2003 – Michael Cooper, Wine Atlas of New Zealand. Hodder Moa Beckett
- 2002 – Lynnsay Rongokea & John Dalley (photographer), The Art of Tivaevae: Traditional Cook Islands Quilting. Godwit
- 2001 – Julie Biuso & Ian Batchelor (photographer), Fresh. New Holland Publishers
- 2000 – Yvonne Cave & Valda Paddison, The Gardener's Encyclopaedia of New Zealand Native Plants. Godwit Press
- 1999 — Heather Nicholson, The Loving Stitch: A History of Knitting and Spinning in New Zealand. Auckland University Press
- 1998 – Geoff Thomas, The Complete New Zealand Fisherman. David Bateman
- 1997 – Michael Cooper, photography by John McDermott, The Wines and Vineyards of New Zealand. Hodder Moa Beckett
- 1996 – Michael Lee-Richards, Cook!. Reed

==== Reference and Anthology ====
The Reference and Anthology award was presented between 2002 and 2009.

- 2009 – C.K. Stead, Collected Poems 1951–2006. Auckland University Press
- 2008 – Gregory O'Brien, A Nest of Singing Birds: 100 Years of the New Zealand School Journal. Learning Media Ltd.
- 2007 – William Cottrell, Furniture of the New Zealand Colonial Era: An Illustrated History 1830–1900. Reed Publishing
- 2006 – Edited by Damien Wilkins, Great Sporting Moments: The best of Sport magazine 1988 – 2004. Victoria University Press
- 2005 – Edited by Tony Deverson & Graeme Kennedy, The New Zealand Oxford Dictionary. Oxford University Press
- 2004 – Edited by Albert Wendt, Reina Whaitiri & Robert Sullivan, Whetu Moana. Auckland University Press
- 2003 – Edited by Paul Morris, Harry Ricketts & Mike Grimshaw, Spirit in a Strange Land: A Selection of New Zealand Spiritual Verse. Godwit Press
- 2002 – Hirini Moko Mead & Neil Grove, Nga Pepeha a Nga Tipuna: The Sayings of the Ancestors. Victoria University Press

=== Fiction runner up and Honour Awards ===
==== Fiction runner up ====
An award for the runner-up(s) in the Fiction category was presented from 2000 to 2009.

- 2009 (joint) – Kate De Goldi, The 10 pm Question. Longacre Press
- 2009 (joint) –Bernard Beckett, Acid Song. Longacre Press
- 2008 – Laurence Fearnley, Edwin & Matilda. Penguin Group (NZ)
- 2007 (joint) – Damien Wilkins, The Fainter. Victoria University Press
- 2007 (joint) – Nigel Cox, The Cowboy Dog. Victoria University Press
- 2006 (joint) – Fiona Kidman, The Captive Wife. Vintage
- 2006 (joint) – Nigel Cox, Responsibility. Victoria University Press
- 2005 (joint) – C K Stead, Mansfield. Vintage Books
- 2005 (joint) – Nigel Cox, Tarzan Presley. Victoria University Press
- 2004 (joint) – Maurice Gee, The Scornful Moon. Penguin Group (NZ)
- 2004 (joint) – Peter Wells, Iridescence. Vintage Books
- 2003 (joint) – Fiona Farrell, The Hopeful Traveller. Vintage Books
- 2003 (joint) – Owen Marshall, When Gravity Snaps. Vintage Books
- 2002 (joint) – Elizabeth Knox, Billie's Kiss. Victoria University Press
- 2002 (joint) – Lloyd Jones, Here at the End of the World We Learn To Dance. Penguin Group (NZ)
- 2001 (joint) – Charlotte Randall, The Curative. Penguin Group (NZ)
- 2001 (joint) – Damien Wilkins, Nineteen Widows Under Ash. Victoria University Press
- 2000 (joint) – Catherine Chidgey, Golden Deeds. Victoria University Press
- 2000 (joint) – C.K. Stead, Talking About O'Dwyer. Penguin Group (NZ)

==== Honour Award ====
- 2002 – Te Onehou Phillis, Eruera Manuera. Huia Publishers
- 1997 (fiction) – Maurice Shadbolt, Dove on the Waters. David Ling
- 1997 (poetry) – J. C. Sturm, Dedications. Steele Roberts
- 1996 – Pei Te Hurinui Jones, translated by Bruce Biggs, Nga Iwi o Tainui: The Traditional History of the Tainui People – Nga Koorero Tuku o Nga Tuupuna. Auckland University Press

=== Other awards ===
==== BPANZ Review Page or Programme Award ====
This award ended in 2009. Before 2006, this award was known as the Review Pages/Section of the Year Award.

- 2009 – New Zealand Listener
- 2008 – New Zealand Listener
- 2007 – New Zealand Listener
- 2006 – Dominion Post
- 2005 – North & South
- 2004 – New Zealand Listener
- 2003 – New Zealand Listener
- 2002 – North & South
- 2001 – The Evening Post
- 2000 – The Evening Post
- 1999 – Landfall
- 1998 – The Evening Post

==== BPANZ Reviewer of the Year Award ====
This award ended in 2009. Before 2006, this award was known as the Reviewer of the Year.

- 2009 – David Eggleton
- 2008 – Charlotte Grimshaw
- 2007 – David Eggleton
- 2006 – Jolisa Gracewood
- 2005 – Tony Simpson
- 2004 – Michael King
- 2003 – David Eggleton
- 2002 – Jane Hurley
- 2001 – David Eggleton
- 2000 – Michael King
- 1999 – Iain Sharp
- 1998 – Graeme Lay

== See also ==
- New Zealand Post Children's Book Awards
- List of New Zealand literary awards
