= Jessie Munro =

New Zealand writer, biographer and French teacher

Jessie Munro (born 1946) is a New Zealand writer, biographer and French teacher. She won the Book of the Year at the 1997 Montana New Zealand Book Awards for her biography of Suzanne Aubert.

== Biography ==
Munro was born in 1946, and was raised on a farm south of Clevedon. She was educated at Papakura High School, and went on to study languages—French, Latin and Italian—and history at the University of Auckland. After completing her bachelor's degree, she spent a few months at the University of Perugia in Italy, before returning to New Zealand, where she married and earned a master's degree in French.

Munro won a Commonwealth scholarship, and she and her husband both studied in Montreal. They then lived in Switzerland until 1972, when they returned to New Zealand. Munro went to teachers' college, before becoming a French teacher at the Correspondence School, based in Wellington.

Invited by the Sisters of Compassion to write a biography of French nun Suzanne Aubert, she travelled to France and Rome to carry out research. The Story of Suzanne Aubert was later followed by Letters on the Go which collects letters written by Aubert over her long life to friends, bishops and politicians.

== Awards and prizes ==
Jessie Munro's biography of Suzanne Aubert, The Story of Suzanne Aubert, won Book of the Year and the New Zealand Society of Authors E.H. McCormick Award for Best First Book of Non-Fiction at the 1997 Montana New Zealand Book Awards.

== Bibliography ==
=== Non fiction ===
- The Story of Suzanne Aubert (Auckland University Press with Bridget Williams Books, 1996)
- Voices of belonging: a history of Clevedon-Te Wairoa (Steele Roberts Aotearoa, 2016)
- (With Barbara Mansell) Signing into history: Clevedon women and the 1893 suffrage petition (Steele Roberts Aotearoa, 2020)

=== In translation ===
- (With Madeleine Le Jeune) Suzanne Aubert: 1835-1926: une Francaise chez les Maoris (Salvator, 2011)

=== As editor ===
- Letters on the Go: The Correspondence of Suzanne Aubert (Bridget Williams Books, 2009)

=== As contributor ===
- The French place in the Bay of Islands: essays from Pompallier's printery = Te urunga mai o te iwi Wīwī (Mātou Matauwhi, 2011)

== See also ==
- List of New Zealand literary awards
