= Godwit Press =

Publisher in New Zealand

Godwit Press is a New Zealand publisher of non-fiction works, mainly of New Zealand arts, literature, and natural history. Initially founded in Auckland in 1990 by Andrew Campbell and Jane Connor, the company was taken over by Random House New Zealand in 2000 and has since been its main non-fiction publishing arm in New Zealand.

Godwit Press (frequently simply referred to as Godwit) has won several New Zealand book awards, as follows:

New Zealand Post Book Awards

- 1999 Illustrative Arts Award winner and NZSA E.H. McCormick Best First Book Award for Non-Fiction - 100 New Zealand Craft Artists (Helen Schamroth)
- 2000 Lifestyle Award winner - The Gardener's Encyclopaedia of New Zealand Native Plants (Yvonne Cave & Valda Paddison)
- 2002 Poetry Award winner - Piggy-back Moon (Hone Tuwhare)
- 2002 Lifestyle & Contemporary Culture Award winner - The Art of Tivaevae: Traditional Cook Islands Quilting (Lynnsay Rongokea & John Dalley)
- 2003 Reference & Anthology Award winner - Spirit in a Strange Land: A Selection of New Zealand Spiritual Verse (eds. Paul Morris, Harry Ricketts & Mike Grimshaw)
- 2005 Montana Medal for Non-Fiction and History Award winner - At Home: A Century of New Zealand Design (Douglas Lloyd Jenkins)
- 2009 NZSA E.H. McCormick Best First Book Award for Non-Fiction - Mates & Lovers: A History of Gay New Zealand (Chris Brickell)
- 2014 Illustrated Non-fiction Award winner - Coast: A New Zealand journey (Bruce Ansley & Jane Ussher)
