= Janet Hunt =

New Zealand writer (born 1951)

- Born: Janet Christine Hunt; 3 September 1951 (age 74); Stratford, New Zealand
- Education: University of Auckland (MA)
- Occupation: Writer
- Writing career
- Notable work: Wetlands of New Zealand (2007)

Academic background
- Thesis: The paua's stout kiss : the poems of Hone Tuwhare : a thematic reading (1995)

Janet Christine Hunt (born 3 September 1951) is a New Zealand writer of non-fiction works for children and adults. She writes primarily about wildlife. Her 2007 book Wetlands of New Zealand received the top prize for non-fiction at the 2008 Montana New Zealand Book Awards.

== Background ==
Hunt was born in Stratford, Taranaki, New Zealand, on 3 September 1951. She grew up in Inglewood on her parents' dairy farm and attended Inglewood High School.

Hunt holds a Bachelor of Arts with honours from Massey University, a teaching diploma from Palmerston North Teachers' College and a Master of Arts degree in English from the University of Auckland. Her thesis was about the poetry of Hone Tuwhare. She has worked as a teacher at primary and secondary schools, a production editor, and as a graphic design lecturer at the Auckland University of Technology and the University of Auckland.

Before 2007 she lived on Waiheke Island for a period, where she became interested in the island's wetlands. She has been a member of Forest & Bird since 1997; in 2014 she became the chairwoman of North Taranaki Forest & Bird.

== Non-fiction writing ==
In 2003, she published a children's non-fiction book, A Bird in the Hand: Keeping New Zealand Wildlife Safe. The book is about efforts to increase the populations of 21 endangered native species in New Zealand, including the Powelliphanta "Egmont". It won Book of the Year and Best in Non-Fiction at the 2004 New Zealand Post Book Awards for Children and Young Adults, won the 2004 Elsie Locke Award for Non-Fiction, and was listed as a 2004 Storylines Notable Non-Fiction Book.

It was followed by From Weta to Kauri: A Guide to the New Zealand Forest (2004), which was a finalist in the non-fiction category at the 2005 New Zealand Post Book Awards for Children and Young Adults and listed as a 2005 Storylines Notable Non-Fiction Book. The Taranaki Daily News review said it would "be on many a forest rambler's list of backpack musts".

Wetlands of New Zealand: A Bitter-sweet Story (2007) won the Environment award and the top prize for non-fiction at the 2008 Montana New Zealand Book Awards. Hunt has described it as the "absolute peak of [her] career". The work included photographs by Hunt herself and by Arno Gasteiger. A review in The Press described it as a "valuable resource" on New Zealand's wetlands: "Beautifully designed by Hunt, with sidebars on bird species and botanical and ecological detail, there are descriptions and predictions, historical eyewitness accounts and early maps".

Hunt published children's book E3 Call Home in 2009. Hunt did her own design and illustrations for the book, which was about the migration of a bar-tailed godwit. It received the Best in Non-Fiction prize at the 2010 New Zealand Post Book Awards for Children and Young Adults, and was listed as a 2010 Storylines Notable Non-Fiction Book

Our Big Blue Backyard (2014) is about New Zealand's marine reserves and the need to protect them.

In 2017 and 2019 Hunt published two children's books of stories about Wildbase Hospital, a wildlife rehabilitation hospital which is part of Massey University. The 2009 book, Three Kiwi Tales, was shortlisted in the non-fiction category of the New Zealand Book Awards for Children and Young Adults. A review in The Daily Post said Hunt "manages to provide a fascinating amount of detail about kiwi and how they survive which can be easily read by children and enjoyed by adults at the same time".

== Selected works ==
- Hone Tuwhare: A biography (1998)
- A Bird in the Hand: Keeping New Zealand Wildlife Safe (Random House, 2003)
- From Weta to Kauri: A Guide to the New Zealand Forest (Random House, 2004)
- Wetlands of New Zealand: A Bitter-sweet Story (Random House, 2007))
- E3 Call Home (Random House, 2009)
- Paradise Saved: The Remarkable Story of New Zealand's Wildlife Sanctuaries and How They Are Stemming the Tide of Extinction (Random House, 2014), co-authored with Dave Butler and Tony Lindsay
- Our Big Blue Backyard: New Zealand's Oceans and Marine Reserves (Random House, 2014)
- How to mend a Kea: + other fabulous fix-it tales from Wildbase Hospital (Massey University Press, 2017)
- Three Kiwi Tales: more fabulous fix-it stories from Wildbase Hospital (Massey University Press, 2019)
