= Jill Trevelyan =

NZ art curator, reviewer, and author

- Born: 1963 (age 62–63)
- Writing career
- Subject: New Zealand art

Jill Trevelyan (born 1963) is a New Zealand art curator, reviewer, and author who specialises in 20th century New Zealand art. Her publications include the collected letters of New Zealand painter Toss Woollaston and a biography of New Zealand art dealer Peter McLeavey, which won the Book of the Year award in the New Zealand Post Book Awards in 2014.

As of 2015, she is the manager of the art collection belonging to New Zealand's Ministry of Foreign Affairs and Trade.

== Publications ==
- Jill Trevelyan, Jennifer Taylor and Greg Donson: Edith Collier: Early New Zealand Modernist, Auckland: Massey University Press, 2024. ISBN 9781991016768
- Robin White: Something is happening here (edited by Sarah Farrar, Jill Trevelyan and Nina Tonga, Te Papa Press and Auckland Art Gallery Toi o Tāmaki), 2022. ISBN 9780995138438
- Peter McLeavey: the life and times of a New Zealand art dealer, Wellington: Te Papa Press, 2013. ISBN 9780987668844
- Rita Angus: an artist's life, Wellington: Te Papa Press, 2008. ISBN 9781877385391
- Jill Trevelyan and William McAloon, Rita Angus: life & vision, Wellington: Te Papa Press, 2008. ISBN 9781877385353
- Jill Trevelyan and Sarah Treadwell, Joanna Margaret Paul: Drawing, Auckland: Auckland University Press and Mahara Gallery, 2006. ISBN 1869403681
- Toss Woollaston: a life in letters, Wellington: Te Papa Press, 2004. ISBN 0909010072
- Jill Trevelyan and Vita Cochran, Rita Angus: live to paint & paint to live, Auckland: Godwit Press in association with City Gallery Wellington, 2001. ISBN 1869620917
- Frances Hodgkins, Wellington: Museum of New Zealand Te Papa Tongarewa, 1993. ISBN 0908843054
- A Canterbury perspective since the 'sixties, Christchurch: Robert McDougall Art Gallery, 1990. ISBN 0908874057

=== Articles ===
- 'Multiplying the angles', New Zealand Listener, 31 Jan 2015
- 'The path followed', Art New Zealand, no. 146, Winter 2013, pp. 62–66
- 'Doing what she pleased', New Zealand books, vol. 20 no.1, Autumn 2010, p. 19
- 'Brideshead revisited', New Zealand Listener, 28 March 2009, p. 43
- 'Power of now', New Zealand Listener, 7 Feb 2009, pp. 44–45
- 'Strange fruit', New Zealand Listener, 9 Aug 2008, p. 44
- 'Perfectly fairy-godmotherish : the friendship of Toss Woollaston and Ursula Bethell', Kotare - New Zealand Notes & Queries, vol. 4, no. 1, June 2001, pp. 3–16
- 'Great expectations : the Promised Land at the Suter', Art New Zealand, no. 96, Spring 2000, pp. 99–101,110
- 'Leonard Mitchell : a cautionary tale', Art New Zealand, no. 67, Winter 1993, pp. 85–87
- 'T A McCormack : the late work', Art New Zealand, no. 61, Summer 1991/92, pp. 58–61

== Awards and recognitions ==
- (2014) New Zealand Post Book Awards Book of the Year and Best Non-fiction book for Peter McLeavey : the life and times of a New Zealand art dealer
- (2014) Random House New Zealand Award for Best Illustrated Book at the PANZ Awards for Peter McLeavey : the life and times of a New Zealand art dealer
- (2009) Montana Medal for Non-Fiction and winner of the Biography Category in the Montana Book Awards for Rita Angus : an artist's life
- (2009) Nielsen BookData NZ Booksellers' Choice Award for Rita Angus : an artist's life
- (2008) Copyright Licensing Ltd Writers Award ($35,000 towards the writing of Rita Angus : an artist's life)

== Further information ==
- "Jill Trevelyan at the NZ Festival Writers Week". RNZ National. 11 March 2014.
- Jill Trevelyan on Peter McLeavey, RadioLive, 17 November 2013
- "Jill Trevelyan interviewed on artist Rita Angus". RNZ National. 24 June 2013.
