= Blue Smoke (book) =

First edition

Blue Smoke: The Lost Dawn of New Zealand Popular Music 1918–1964 is a prize-winning book by Chris Bourke on the early history of music in New Zealand published by the Auckland University Press.

Bourke is a music writer who has been writing about music since 1987. He wrote Blue Smoke while on the National Library’s research fellowship in 2006 and later as writer-in-residence at the University of Waikato.

Blue Smoke won the 2011 New Zealand Post Book awards.
