= Dance Prone =

First edition (publ. Picador)

Dance Prone is the second novel by New Zealand author David Coventry. Released in July 2020, the novel examines the post-hardcore scene in the US during the mid-1980s and the traumatic effects of sexual abuse met upon several of the novels characters over the following decades. 'Filtered through a screen of trauma and amnesia' the novel is 'part whodunnit, and part philosophical voyage.'

== Style and themes ==
Coventry has stated in interviews the novel is an attempt to further explore his investigations into memory initially explored in his debut, The Invisible Mile. 'Across its 400–odd pages, Dance Prone disrupts linear time and jumps between 1985 and the early 21st century, with chapters ranging from 2002 to 2020. In other words, we see the main characters in their 20s and then ageing into their 40s and 50s. Ageing and memory are key preoccupations of this novel.' In his review of the novel, John Duke states the question of violence, memory and its unreliability run throughout the book as Coventry uses music to address bigger concerns dealing with trauma, stating with in the narrative 'the act of remembering can turn into a form of trauma in itself.' With music at times acting as a stand in for the machinations of memory, memory is portrayed as at once destructive and creative. The novel uses elliptical language games to confront wider philosophical issues outside of the narrative itself. With each song in the book standing in for an act of memory, the performance of the music ritualizes the destruction of old memories and consecrates the new. The deconstructive trust of this portrayal enables memory to have a physical trace in both the bodies of the performers and the audience. This is explicit on the language forms the author uses to eke out the narrative. According to Annaleese Jochems: 'Much of the novel is written in pushing, intestinal sentences. Each word feels carefully chosen; the density and drive of the novel’s language give a great sense of force and urgency.... Coventry engages the blind, helpless evil behind the perpetrator’s actions with thought and empathy, at no cost to our sense of the inestimable hurt suffered by the victims.'

== Reception ==
The novel has been well received, with mainly favourable reviews. In the New Zealand Herald, David Herkt stated that the novel is 'profound… Pitch-perfect and nuanced. As Dance Prone proves, Coventry’s work is some of the finest in recent New Zealand literature. His explorations of music and art are remarkable. His characters live and resound. The American Midwest, the city square of Jemaa el-Fna in Marrakech, and the coast near Red Rocks in Wellington are all landscapes evoked with clarity…. Extraordinary and remarkable.' For the Readingroom Annaleese Jochems remarked "The blood, desire, pain and loss – as well as Conrad’s eventual contentment – all of it feels true, because of the novel’s volatile physicality, and the unshrinking vulnerability of its narrator. More than anything I’ve read in ages, Dance Prone feels real." In her review Josie Shapiro stated that "Dance Prone is a novel that interrogates music and it’s [sic] capacity for producing societal change, the bonds of friendship and family, and the manner in which we avoid confronting ourselves with the truth. …. I had a sense that if I could unlock one sentence, then I might discover the meaning of the whole novel, or perhaps the meaning of life. … Coventry is committed to writing fiction that’s gritty and raw and true."
