= Wichtel =

Wichtel is a surname. Notable people with the surname include:

- Diana Wichtel, New Zealand author, journalist and cultural critic
- Peter Wichtel, German politician and trade unionist
