= Rewi =

Rewi is both a given name and surname. It is a Māori transliteration of the name Dave, Davie, Louis, or Levi.

Notable people with the name include:

== Given name ==
- Rewi Alley (1897–1987), New Zealand-born writer and political activist in China
- Rewi Braithwaite (1897–1987), New Zealand footballer
- Rewi Maniapoto (1807–1894), Ngāti Maniapoto chief and rebel leader during the New Zealand Wars

== Surname ==
- Poia Rewi, New Zealand Māori academic
