= Lynley Hood =

New Zealand author

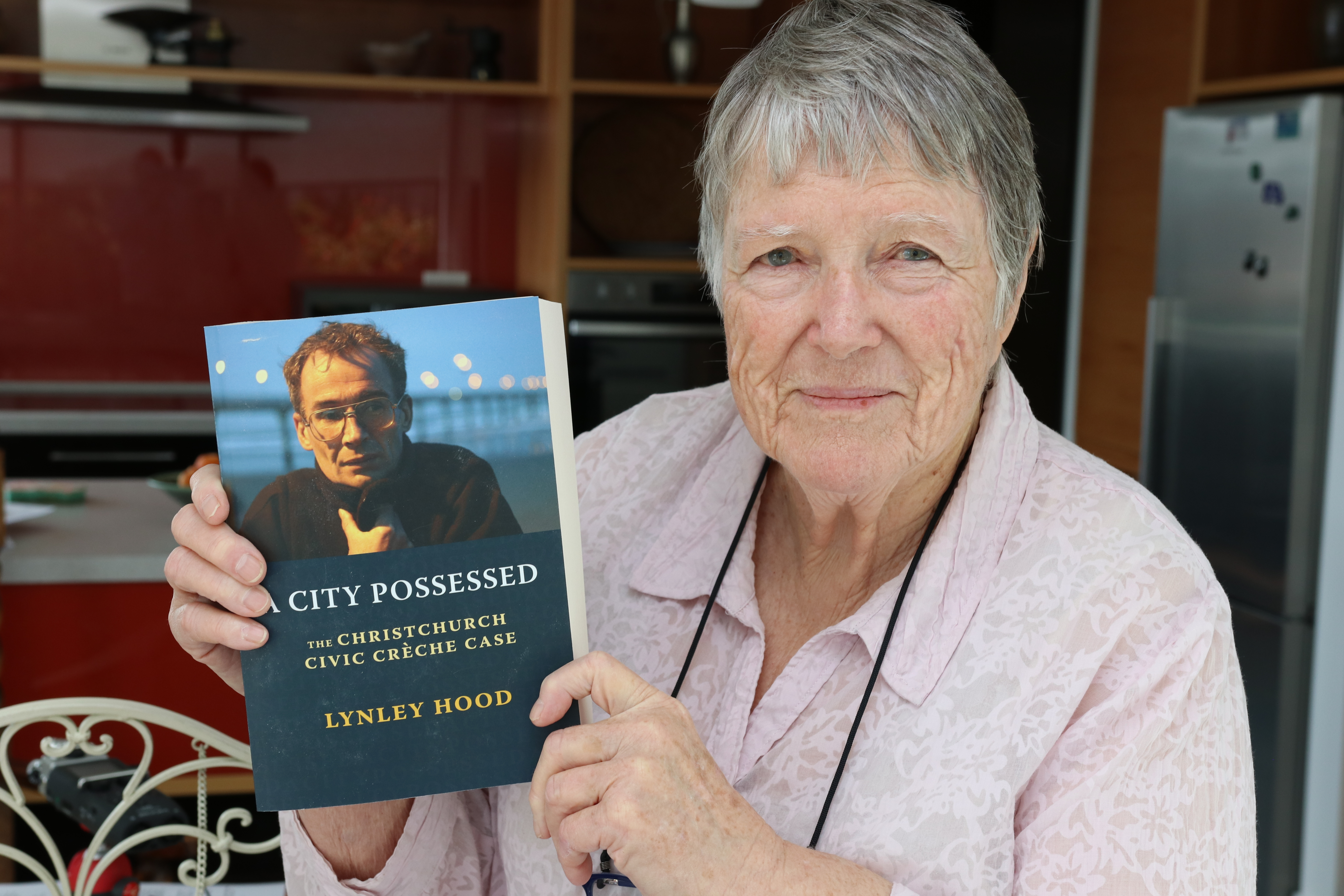
- Born: 1942 (age 83–84); Hamilton, New Zealand
- Education: University of Otago
- Occupation: writer
- Voice of Lynley Hood
- Website: Official website

Lynley Hood (born 1942) is an author from New Zealand.

== Biography ==
Hood was born in 1942 in Hamilton, New Zealand. She has an MSc in Physiology, and LittD from University of Otago. She currently lives in Dunedin.

Hood worked in medical research until 1979, after which she worked as a freelance writer. She has published a number of biographies and non-fiction works. She has also been published in New Zealand Books, the Otago Daily Times, the New Zealand Listener, New Zealand Author, and North & South.

== Selected works ==
- Sylvia! The Biography of Sylvia Ashton-Warner (1989), a biography of author Sylvia Ashton-Warner
- Who is Sylvia? The Diary of a Biography (1990)
- Minnie Dean: Her Life & Crimes (1994), a biography of Minnie Dean, the only woman to receive the death penalty in New Zealand
- City Possessed: The Christchurch Civic Crèche Case (2001)

== Awards ==
Sylvia! The Biography of Sylvia Ashton-Warner won first prize at the 1980 Goodman Fielder Wattie Book Awards. It also won the 1989 PEN Best First Book of Prose Award and 1990 Talking Book of the Year.

Minnie Dean: Her Life & Crimes was a finalist in the 1995 New Zealand Book Awards.

In 2002, City Possessed: The Christchurch Civic Creche Case won the Readers' Choice Award and the Montana Medal for Non-Fiction at the Montana New Zealand Book Awards. It also won the 2002 NZ Skeptics Bravo Award.

Hood received the 1991 Robert Burns Fellowship.
