= Always Becominging =

New Zealand poet

- Born: 1990 (age 35–36); New Zealand
- Other names: Jay Nieuwland; Jackson Nieuwland
- Occupation: Poet
- Awards: MitoQ Best First Book Awards: Jessie Mackay Prize for Poetry

Always Becominging (formerly Jay Nieuwland; born 1990) is a New Zealand poet, editor and co-founder of the publishing house We Are Babies. Her 2021 publication I Am a Human Being won the best first book award (poetry) at the Ockham New Zealand Book Awards.

== Biography ==
Becominging was born and raised in Wellington. She first seriously began writing poetry in high school, after developing a passion for New Zealand hip hop artists such as Frontline and the Breakin Wreckwordz hip-hop collective, eventually realising that she was drawn to the process of writing, instead of hip-hop performance. Becominging studied creative writing at Whitireia New Zealand.

Together with American poet Carolyn DeCarlo, Becominging co-founded the independent publishing house We Are Babies. Becominging and DeCarlo worked on a number of projects, including the eBook Twilight Zone (2013) and Bound: an Ode to Falling in Love (2014), a fictionalised chapbook telling the story of Kim Kardashian and Kanye West's relationship. In 2015, We Are Babies released the poetry anthology Left: a Book of Words and Pictures, which featured Becominging as the work's editor. Becominging and DeCarlo also founded the zine/poetry reading collective Food Court, which eventually expanded to become a physical store in Newtown, Wellington. The store shut down in 2022.

In the early 2010s, Becominging began writing the poetry collection I Am a Human Being. Halfway through the writing process, Becominging realised that she was genderqueer. I Am a Human Being was eventually published by Compound Press in 2020, winning the MitoQ Best First Book Award for Poetry at the 2021 Ockham New Zealand Book Awards, and was longlisted for the Mary and Peter Biggs Award for Poetry. A review in Landfall described it as "a unified artwork and a collection of lyrical bangers", and said the book was "probably the funniest book of poetry published in Aotearoa this year".

As of 2022, Becominging is completing a PhD in poetics.

== Personal life ==
Becominging previously identified as genderqueer. In 2021, Becominging came out as a trans woman, and started using she/her pronouns.

Becominging met Carolyn DeCarlo online in 2011, on the literary website HTMLGIANT. After the pair developed a long-distance relationship, DeCarlo moved to New Zealand from Maryland. Becominging and DeCarlo separated in 2022.

== Bibliography ==
- DeCarlo, Carolyn; Nieuwland, Jackson (2014). Bound: an Ode to Falling in Love. Auckland: Compound Press. ISBN 9780994112323. OCLC 1003123254.
- Nieuwland, Jackson, ed. (2015). Left: a Book of Words and Pictures. Wellington: Compound Press. ISBN 9780473316518. OCLC 934111390.
- Nieuwland, Jackson (2020). I Am a Human Being. Auckland: Compound Press. ISBN 9780995125148. OCLC 1241570294.
