= Stephanie Gibson =

Stephanie Gibson is a New Zealand writer and museum curator.

== Biography ==
Gibson was part of the team which re-developed the Museum of Wellington City and Sea. She was also the first collection manager of the Adam Art Gallery at Victoria University. She is a curator of New Zealand history and culture at the Museum of New Zealand Te Papa Tongarewa.

=== Awards and recognition ===
- Co-winner, Best Illustrated Non-Fiction at the 2020 Ockham New Zealand Book Awards for Protest = Tautohetohe : objects of resistance persistence and defiance

== Publications ==
- Gibson S. & Regnault C. (2023) Tiny Statements: A social history of Aotearoa New Zealand in badges Te Papa Press
- Gibson S. Williams M. & Cairns P. (2019). Protest = Tautohetohe : objects of resistance persistence and defiance. Te Papa Press.
- Labrum B. McKergow F. & Gibson S. (2007). Looking flash : clothing in Aotearoa New Zealand. Auckland University Press.
