= Joan Whincup =

New Zealand non-fiction writer

Joan Whincup is a New Zealand non-fiction writer. The book Akekeia! Traditional Dance in Kiribati, which she co-authored with Tony Whincup, won an Ockham New Zealand Book Award in 2002.

== Biography ==
Whincup was born in the United Kingdom. She and her husband Tony Whincup lived in Uganda for a time, then in 1976 moved to Kiribati. In 1984 the couple moved to New Zealand.

In 2002, the Whincups' book on traditional dance in Kiribati won the illustrative book category in the Ockham New Zealand Book Awards.

== Publications ==
- Whincup, J., & Arawatau (1981). Te Katake. Tarawa: Ministry of Education, Training and Culture, Kiribati.
- Whincup, T., & Whincup, J. (2001). Akekeia!: Traditional dance in Kiribati. Wellington: Tony and Joan Whincup.
