= Heather Nicholson (geologist) =

New Zealand geologist and writer (1931–2019)

- Born: Heather Margaret Halcrow; 19 June 1931; Hamilton, New Zealand
- Died: 9 July 2019 (aged 88); Orewa, New Zealand
- Occupation: Schoolteacher
- Children: 2
- Writing career
- Genre: Non-fiction
- Subject: Textile crafts
- Notable works: The Loving Stitch: a History of Knitting and Spinning in New Zealand
- Notable awards: 1999 Montana Medal for non-fiction
- Scientific career
- Education: University of Auckland
- Fields: Geology
- Theses: Geology of Waiheke Island (1953); The New Zealand greywackes: a study of changing geological concepts to 1985 (2003)
- Doctoral advisor: Bernhard Spörli

Heather Margaret Halcrow Nicholson (née Halcrow, 19 June 1931 – 9 July 2019) was a New Zealand geologist and writer. Her book, The Loving Stitch: a History of Knitting and Spinning in New Zealand, was judged best non-fiction book at the 1999 Montana Book Awards.

== Biography ==
Nicholson was born Heather Margaret Halcrow in Hamilton on 19 June 1931, the daughter of Amy and Tom Halcrow, and was raised at Galatea. After studying physical geography at high school, she enrolled at Auckland University College in 1949, where she decided to study geology. She was the first woman whose thesis, titled Geology of Waiheke Island and supervised by Arthur Lillie, was primarily based on fieldwork and the first woman in New Zealand to conduct a major geological mapping project. She graduated MSc with second-class honours in 1954. The following year, she married Ian Nicholson, and the couple went on to have twin daughters.

Heather Nicholson worked as a secondary-school science teacher, and rose to become head of science at Westlake Girls High School in Takapuna. However, she retired in the 1970s due to ill health, and became active as a practitioner and adult-education teacher of craftwork. In 1988, her instructional book Knitters Know-How was published. In 1993, she was awarded a grant by the Suffrage Centennial Trust to write a history of knitting, resulting in the publication of The Loving Stitch: a History of Knitting and Spinning in New Zealand in 1998. The book won Montana Medal for non-fiction at the Montana Book Awards the next year.

By now in her late 60s, Nicholson returned to the University of Auckland to undertake doctoral studies on the history of geological understanding in New Zealand. She completed her PhD thesis, titled The New Zealand greywackes: a study of changing geological concepts to 1985, supervised by Bernhard Spörli, in 2003, and is thought to be one of the oldest people in New Zealand to have earned a postgraduate degree in geology.

Nicholson died in Orewa on 9 July 2019.
