= Stonedogs =

Book by Craig Marriner

Stonedogs is the first novel by New Zealand writer Craig Marriner. It was published in 2001 and has won a Montana New Zealand Book Award. The book has been described as "a kind of A Clockwork Orange-meets-Once Were Warriors as imagined by Irvine Welsh". In 2003, the film rights were sold to Australian production company Mushroom Pictures, but no film has eventuated.

Stonedogs is structurally unusual; some text takes the form of a play with stage directions, and there are sudden shifts from narrator's voice to outside observer. Pages of inner narrative are italicised. For Marriner, "It was important to do something that would be seen as innovative in terms of structure and format, to come up with mediums which are slightly alternative to what's been done. I saw devices which hadn't been used and I couldn't see why they hadn't." Stonedogs received critical acclaim, winning the Deutz Medal for Fiction in 2002 in the Montana New Zealand Book Awards.

== Themes and plot ==
The novel deals with issues such as alienation, social decay, drug use and New Zealand gang culture, as well as political and environmental issues. Speaking of the novel, Marriner told an interviewer, "I've been pretty disillusioned with mainstream society for a while, I just don't see a future in it. And I've been moving in working-class circles and watching the quiet desperation everyone lives their lives through. So the novel comes from there, and questions where we're going environmentally and politically." There are strong left-wing political themes expressed; Marriner has cited leftists such as Noam Chomsky, Robert Fisk and Leon Trotsky as influences.

The story revolves around the protagonist, Gator, an unemployed young adult with anti-capitalist and neo-Nietzschean philosophies, and his friends in Rotorua. All are involved in recreational drug use. After they try to purchase LSD from members of the fictional gang "The Rabble", Gator causes an incident and makes an enemy in the leader of the gang chapter. After a tip-off from his friend Steve, whose cousin is a gang prospect, Gator and the others plan to steal the harvest of the gang's marijuana crop. They drive their Holden to Northland and after unplanned events take place attempt to sell their haul to a gang of Auckland skinheads, later running into trouble with a corrupt police officer.
