= Claire Regnault =

New Zealand historian, curator and writer

- Born: 1970 (age 55–56)

Claire Regnault (born 1970) is a New Zealand historian, curator and non-fiction writer. In 2022, her book Dressed: Fashionable Dress in Aotearoa New Zealand 1840 to 1910 won an Ockham New Zealand Book Award.

== Biography ==
Regnault started her career in art galleries and museums in 1994. She is a curator at Te Papa, New Zealand's national museum. She researches and writes about the history of fashion in New Zealand. In 2022 she won the illustrated non-fiction category of the Ockham New Zealand Book Awards.

== Publications ==
- Regnault, C. (2021). Dressed: Fashionable dress in Aotearoa New Zealand 1840 to 1910. Wellington, New Zealand: Te Papa Press.
- Regnault, C., & Te Papa. (2013). Cubist dreams and wings like fireflies. Wellington: Te Papa Press for Nga Toi/Arts Te Papa.
- Fitzgerald, M., & Regnault, C. (2010). Berry boys: Portraits of World War One Soldiers and families. Wellington, New Zealand: Te Papa Press.
- Regnault, C., & Hawke's Bay Museum. (2003). The New Zealand Gown of the Year. Napier, N.Z.: Hawke's Bay Museum.
- Regnault, C., Pope, G., & Napier (N.Z.). (2000). The fifty 50s: Napier becomes a city, 1950. Napier, N.Z.: Hawke's Bay Cultural Trust with assistance from the Napier City Council.
- Regnault, C., Gorman, K., Govett-Brewster Art Gallery., & Taranaki Polytechnic. (1996). Shadow work. New Plymouth, N.Z: Govett-Brewster Art Gallery.
- Caldwell, E., Regnault, C., & McDougall Art Annex. (1995). Inside the solid. Christchurch, N.Z.: McDougall Art Annex.
