= Nicole Titihuia Hawkins =

New Zealand poet

Nicole Titihuia Hawkins is a New Zealand writer and poet. Her debut collection, Whai, was the winner of the Jessie Mackay Prize for the best first book of poetry at the Ockham New Zealand Book Awards in 2022.

== Biography ==
Hawkins is a high school teacher, teaching English, social sciences and tikanga Māori. She has organised literary events such as Rhyme Time, a regional youth event, and Poetry with Brownies to encourage youth and indigenous poets to perform their original poetry.

In 2022 her first book of poetry, Whai, won the Jessie Mackay Prize for best first book of poetry at the Ockham New Zealand Book Awards.

Hawkins affiliates to Ngāti Kahungunu ki te Wairoa and Ngāti Pāhauwera iwi.
