= Anne Rimmer =

New Zealand conservationist and writer

Anne Rimmer (née Boyd, born 1947) is a New Zealand conservationist and writer. In 2005 she won a Montana Book Award for her book about the history of the island Tiritiri Matangi. Rimmer has written a follow-up book covering the history of the island to 2020, and also edited the life story of a lighthouse keeper, Ray Walter.

== Biography ==
Rimmer grew up in Wellington, where she developed a love of theatre. She earned a Bachelor of Science in chemistry at Victoria University of Wellington, and worked in science in Canada for the following twenty years. Rimmer returned to New Zealand with her two young daughters in 1991, after the death of her husband. She became Chair of the North Shore branch of Forest and Bird, and then became a guide and volunteer on the open sanctuary island, Tiritiri Matangi Island, near Auckland, for over 20 years. She wrote a book about the island, Tiritiri Matangi: a model of conservation, published by Tandem Press, which won a Montana Book Award in 2005. The book has a foreword by David Bellamy, and was reprinted in 2023. A follow-up supplement Tiritiri Matangi 2005–2020 was self-published in 2021. In 2025 Rimmer edited the life story of the late Ray Walter, entitled The Lights in My Life: the Memoirs of a Kiwi lighthouse keeper. Walter was lighthouse keeper at eight different stations in New Zealand, including the remote Puysegur Point Lighthouse in Fiordland, and after his final stint at Tiritiri Matangi in the 1980s, he remained on the island as the Department of Conservation ranger.

Rimmer lives on the North Shore in Auckland, where she has campaigned for cleaner beaches.
