= Craig Marriner =

New Zealand novelist

Craig Marriner (born 1974) is a novelist from Rotorua, New Zealand. He is best known for his award-winning first novel Stonedogs (2001).

== Early life ==
Marriner was born in Rotorua and had what he describes as a "strictly working-class background"; his father was a forestry worker until he was made redundant. Marriner left high school before completing his final year, describing himself as being "on the edge of the rails by then". He moved to the remote town of Mount Magnet, Western Australia with the intention of getting a mining job, and worked doing geological sampling. He subsequently spent four years working in Europe.

== Career ==
Marriner's debut novel Stonedogs (2001) won the Deutz Medal for Fiction, the Fiction Prize and the NZSA Hubert Church Best First Book Award for Fiction at the 2002 Montana New Zealand Book Awards. In 2003 the film rights were sold to Australian production company Mushroom Pictures, although as of 2021 no film has been made. In 2004 he was the recipient of the Buddle Findlay Sargeson Fellowship. His second novel Southern Style was published in 2006. At the time he was said to have been working on a third novel about a group of backpackers trekking through Europe during the 2003 invasion of Iraq.

In 2017, Scottish writer Duncan McLean noted Marriner's long absence from publishing, and said he hoped that Marriner would return. In McLean's view, Southern Style was a stronger novel than his first, but "no one seems to have written much about it".

In 2018, Marriner published a short meta-fiction story with The Spinoff, under the title "Exclusive: The return of Craig Marriner, the lost genius of New Zealand writing".

== Style ==
In 2001 Marriner described himself as wanting to be seen as "a Kiwi art house youth culture-type writer". He cited his influences as George Orwell, Kurt Vonnegut and Hunter S Thompson, as well as journalist Robert Fisk and Marxist theorist Leon Trotsky. His writing style has been compared to Scottish novelist Irvine Welsh.
