= Longacre Press =

New Zealand publisher

Longacre Press was founded in 1995 in New Zealand, by Barbara Larson, Paula Boock, and Lynsey Ferrari, three former workers at McIndoe Publishing, Dunedin. The company was originally located at Dowling Street, close to the city's Exchange Neighbourhood, but later moved to Moray Place in the city centre of Dunedin.

Longacre specialised in non-fiction, including self-help, food, the outdoors, and natural history books. Additionally, it published junior and young-adult fiction, and work by writers such as Owen Marshall, Brian Turner, Lynley Hood, and Jack Lasenby for which it won multiple national book awards.

In 2003, the company took on the catalogue of Shoal Bay Press of Christchurch. At about the same time, the distribution of Longacre's books changed from Macmillan Books to Random House. Longacre Press was acquired by Random House in 2009.

== Sources ==
- The New Zealand Writer's Handbook
- Writers & Artists' Yearbook
