= Terry Mitchell =

New Zealand rugby union player (born 1950)

- Born: Terry William Mitchell; 11 September 1950 (age 76) Tākaka, New Zealand
- Height: 1.73 m (5 ft 8 in)
- Weight: 92 kg (203 lb)
- School: Takaka District High School
- Notable relative: Maui John Mitchell (brother)

Rugby union career
- Position: Wing
Provincial / State sides
Years	Team	Apps	(Points)
1968	Golden Bay-Motueka		
1969–1972	Nelson Bays	42	
1973–1978	Canterbury	60	
International career
Years	Team	Apps	(Points)
1971–1974	New Zealand Māori		
1974–1976	New Zealand	1	(0)

Terry William Mitchell (born 11 September 1950) is a former New Zealand rugby union player. A wing, Mitchell represented Golden Bay-Motueka and then Nelson Bays (after the former's amalgamation with Nelson), and later Canterbury at a provincial level. He was a member of the New Zealand national side, the All Blacks, from 1974 to 1976, playing 17 matches including one international as a substitute.
