= Hilary Mitchell =

New Zealand historian

- Awards: Ockham New Zealand Book Awards

Academic background
- Education: Massey University, University of Canterbury

Hilary Anne Mitchell is a New Zealand historian and author. With her husband, John Mitchell, she published four volumes on the history of Māori in Nelson and Marlborough. The second volume won the Montana New Zealand Book Award for history. Mitchell also served on the Nelson City Council.

== Career ==
Mitchell was married to Māori historian John Mitchell, who she met while they were both studying at the University of Canterbury. They got married in 1966 and Mitchell worked as a secondary school teacher. In 1985 they began a research company together, Mitchell Research, and the two worked together until John's death in 2021. Mitchell was a Nelson City Councillor. She described it as "being paid to pursue my favourite pastime (arguing)". She was first elected in the 1989 local election, where she came first in the Maitai ward. In the 1992 local election, councillors were elected at-large. Mitchell was successful by coming tenth for twelve positions. She did not seek re-election at the 1995 local election.

Mitchell was a board member of Nelson Marlborough Institute of Technology and Nelson Tasman Heritage Trust.

The Mitchells wrote four volumes of a history of Māori of Nelson and Marlborough. Their work informed the Treaty of Waitangi claims of eight iwi. The second volume, published in 2007, won the Montana New Zealand Book Award for history in 2008. The Mitchell's last book together was on British painter Isaac Coates, and was published in 2021. Coates had painted portraits of fifty-eight Māori people in the Nelson region between 1841 and 1845, although Coates's identity was unknown until 2000.

The Mitchells were invited to give the 2006 James Jenkins Lecture at the Nelson Historical Society, in which they described how their work on the history of Māori in Nelson came about.

== Selected works ==
- Mitchell, John; Mitchell, Hilary (2004). Te Tau Ihu o te Waka: a History of Māori of Nelson and Marlborough. Vol. 1. Huia. ISBN 1869690877.
- Mitchell, Hilary; Mitchell, John (2007). Te Tau Ihu o Te Waka: A History of Nelson and Marlborough (Volume II: Te Ara Hou — The New Society). Huia.
- Mitchell, Hilary; Mitchell, John (2021). He Ringatoi o ngā Tūpuna: Isaac Coates and his Māori Portraits. Nelson: Potton & Burton. ISBN 9781988550206.
- Mitchell, Hilary; Mitchell, John (April 2010). "The Parihaka Prophets in Nelson". The Prow.
- Mitchell, Hilary; Mitchell, Maui John (2006). Reclaiming rangatiratanga: the Wakatu Incorporation and the Crown. Wellington, N.Z.: Stout Research Centre for New Zealand Studies. Treaty of Waitangi Research Unit.
