= Monique Fiso =

New Zealand-Samoan chef and author

- Born: Monique Tumema Fiso; 23 October 1987 (age 39); Wellington, New Zealand
- Education: Wellington Institute of Technology
- Occupation: Chef

Monique Tumema Fiso (born 23 October 1987) is a New Zealand chef and author known for her contribution to the revival of Māori and Polynesian cuisine.

== Early life ==
Fiso was born in Wellington, New Zealand, and is of Māori and Samoan descent. Fiso made a name for herself in New York, working in Michelin-star restaurants. With her trademark determination she decided to make a shift and came home to discover a new style of cooking, and a new side to herself. She appeared on Netflix's The Final Table.

Fiso is the second of five children. Her brother is the New Zealand crossfit athlete and six-time New Zealand fittest man, Luke Fiso, and her cousin Maaka Fiso is a radio host and competed on X-Factor New Zealand. She also comes from a long line of entrepreneurs, which she credits for her strong work ethic. Her parents Siuai and Serena Fiso run a number of businesses and her uncle is investor John Fiso.

== Career ==
Fiso attended Wellington Institute of Technology where she gained a City & Guilds Diploma in Cookery and Patisserie and graduated first in her class. While completing her culinary studies she worked under New Zealand chef Martin Bosley. She then moved to New York City to further expand her culinary knowledge and experience as a chef. During her time in New York, she worked for Michelin starred chefs Brad Farmerie, Missy Robbins and Matt Lambert.

In 2016, Fiso returned to New Zealand and founded Hiakai, a pop up dining series devoted to the exploration and development of Māori cooking techniques and ingredients. In 2017, the New Zealand Innovation Council awarded Hiakai the top award for "Innovation in Māori Development" and finalist for "Start up Innovation of the Year" and "Supreme New Zealand Innovation of the Year". She has appeared on New Zealand television and radio shows including Radio Live, Maori Television, and Sunday TVNZ.

Fiso released a book about Māori cuisine also called Hiakai: Modern Māori Cuisine in 2020 which won the Booksellers Aotearoa New Zealand Award for Illustrated Nonfiction at the 2021 Ockham New Zealand Book Awards.
