= Slow Water =

2003 novel by Annamarie Jagose

- First edition
- Author: Annamarie Jagose
- Language: English
- Genre: Novel
- Publisher: Vintage Books, Australia
- Publication date: 2003
- Publication place: Australia
- Media type: Print (Paperback)
- Pages: 340 pp
- ISBN: 1-74051-241-3
- OCLC: 58725636

Slow Water is a 2003 novel by New Zealand author Annamarie Jagose.

== Notes ==
- "Dedication: For Lee".

== Awards ==
- Miles Franklin Literary Award, 2004: shortlisted
- Victorian Premier's Literary Award, The Vance Palmer Prize for Fiction, 2004: winner
- Montana New Zealand Book Awards, Deutz Medal For Fiction, 2004: winner
