= Annamarie Jagose =

New Zealand LGBT academic and fiction writer

Annamarie Jagose OAM FAHA
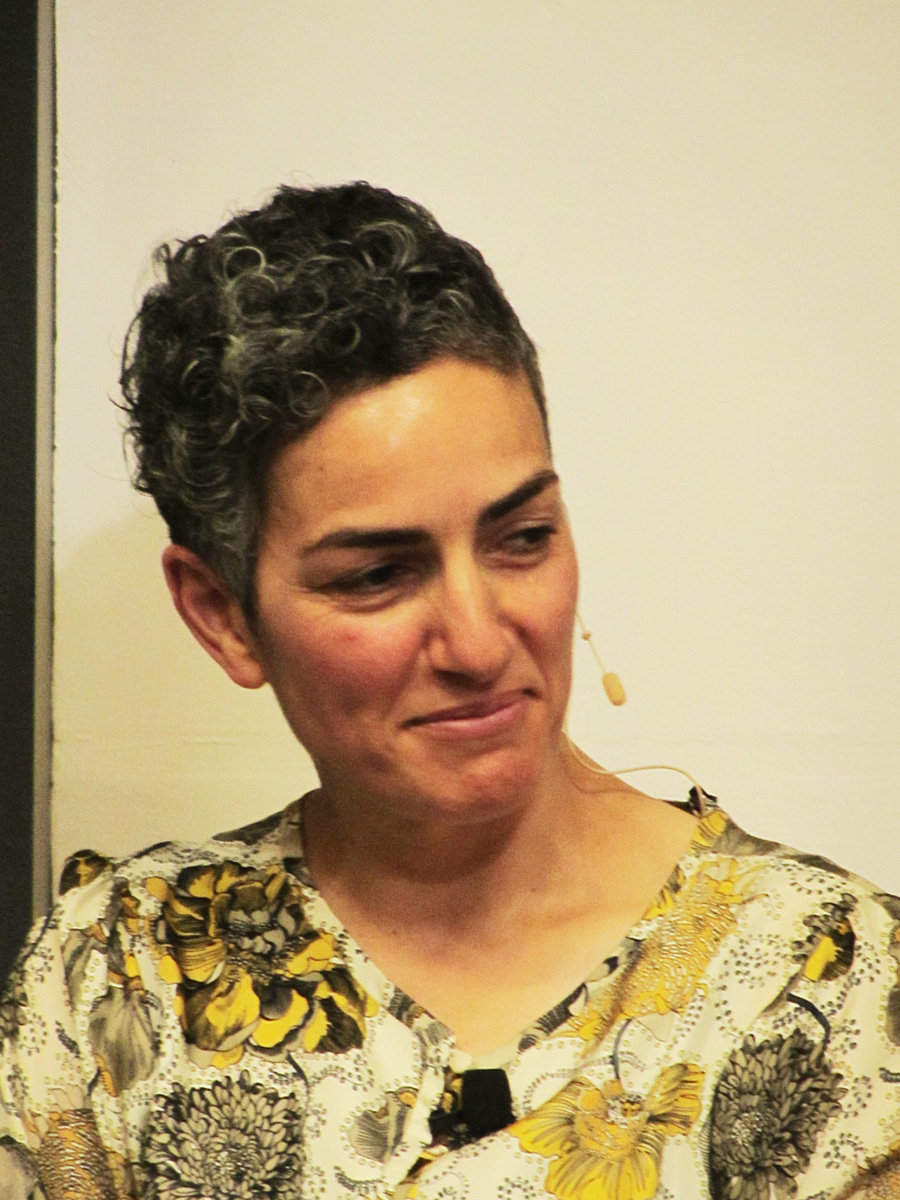
- Annamarie Jagose lecturing in November 2012
- Born: 1965 (age 60–61); Ashburton, New Zealand
- Occupations: Provost and Deputy Vice-Chancellor, Professor, writer
- Employer: University of Sydney

Annamarie Jagose OAM FAHA (born 1965) is a New Zealand LGBT academic and writer of fictional works.

== Life and career ==
Jagose was born in Ashburton, New Zealand in 1965. She received her PhD from Victoria University of Wellington in 1992, and worked in the Department of English and Cultural Studies at the University of Melbourne, before returning to New Zealand in 2003 as a Professor in the Department of Film, Television and Media Studies at the University of Auckland and Head of the Department from 2008 to 2010.

From 2011 to 2016 she was Head of the School of Literature, Art and Media at the University of Sydney and in 2017 she took up the role of Dean of the Faculty of Arts and Social Sciences at the University of Sydney. She has been the subject of recent controversy in her administrative position at the University of Sydney for initiating a restructure of the University in light of the coronavirus pandemic, which could see 30% of staff made redundant. In October 2021, she was appointed as Provost and Deputy Vice-Chancellor at the University of Sydney.

== Awards and honours ==
- 1994 won NZSA Best First Book Award for In Translation
- 2004 won Deutz Medal for Fiction in the Montana New Zealand Book Awards for Slow Water
- 2004 winner of the Vance Palmer Prize for Fiction for Slow Water
- 2004 was shortlisted for the Australian Miles Franklin Literary Award for Slow Water
- 2015 elected Fellow of the Australian Academy of the Humanities
- 2026 awarded Medal of the Order of Australia for "service to tertiary education"

== Selected works ==
- Lesbian Utopics (New York: Routledge, 1994)
- In Translation (Wellington: Victoria University Press and Sydney: Allen and Unwin, 1994)
- Queer Theory: An Introduction (New York: New York University Press, 1996)
- Lulu: A Romance (Wellington: Victoria University Press and Sydney: Allen and Unwin, 1998)
- Inconsequence: Lesbian Representation and the Logic of Sexual Sequence (Ithaca: Cornell University Press, 2002)
- Slow Water (Wellington: Victoria University Press and Sydney: Random House, 2003)
- Orgasmology (Durham: Duke University Press, 2013)
