= Poia Rewi =

Māori language researcher in New Zealand

Poia Rewi is a professor and the former head of Te Tumu: School of Maori, Pacific, and Indigenous Studies at the University of Otago in Dunedin, New Zealand. He is known for his work in the areas of the revitalisation of the Māori language and whaikorero (Māori oratory). He is a Fellow of the Royal Society Te Apārangi.

== Education and career ==
He graduated from the University of Otago in 2005 with a Doctor of Philosophy (PhD) in Maori Studies with a thesis entitled, Te Ao o te Whaikōrero. This was the first thesis at the university to be written entirely in Māori.

== Awards ==
In March 2021, Rewi was made a Fellow of the Royal Society Te Apārangi, with recognition that he is "one of the most active research specialists in Māori culture, language revitalisation, oral history and performing arts".

== Selected works ==
- Rewi, P. (2006). Te Rakiraki Anuanu! In P. Walker & H. Raven (Eds.), Te Tū a Te Toka: He Ieretanga nō ngā Tai e Whā. (pp. 17–20). Wellington, New Zealand: Toi Māori Aotearoa.
- Rewi, P. (2010). Whaikōrero: The world of Māori oratory. Auckland University Press.
- As editor: Hokowhitu, B., Kermoal, N., Andersen, C., Petersen, A., Reilly, M., Altamirano-Jiménez, I., & Rewi, P. (Eds.). (2010). Indigenous identity and resistance: Researching the diversity of knowledge. Dunedin, New Zealand: Otago University Press.
- Rewi, P. (2010). Culture: Compromise or perish! In B. Hokowhitu, N. Kermaol, C. Andersen, A. Petersen, M. Reilly, I. Altamirano-Jiménez & P. Rewi (Eds.), Indigenous identity and resistance: Researching the diversity of knowledge. (pp. 55–74). Dunedin, New Zealand: Otago University Press.

== Personal life ==
Rewi is of Ngati Manawa, Te Arawa and Tuhoe descent.
