= A Different Kind of Power =

2025 memoir by Jacinda Ardern

- Author: Jacinda Ardern
- Publisher: Penguin Books
- Publication date: 3 June 2025
- ISBN: 9781776951277

A Different Kind of Power is a memoir by Jacinda Ardern, the prime minister of New Zealand from 2017 to 2023. It was published in June 2025. The book was shortlisted for the General Non-Fiction Award and won the Best First Book Award at the 2026 Ockham New Zealand Book Awards.

== Development and writing ==
In June 2023 Ardern signed a deal with Penguin Books for rights to publish the book in Australia and New Zealand. She was initially reluctant to write a memoir. In January 2025 Ardern announced that the memoir would be released in June that year. The memoir was able to be pre-ordered. She said that it would provide more information about her leadership and her resignation from her role as prime minister in 2023. She also said that she attempted to give the reader an idea of what it is like to lead a country, and that the purpose of writing the book was to encourage more people to consider careers in public service, rather than to act as a typical political memoir. Ardern read the book aloud for an audio book version of the memoir.

== Contents ==
The memoir is chronological, starting before her time in government, covering topics such as family and school. The moment Ardern accepted her leadership of the Labour Party is about half way through the book. The memoir covers the major events during her term as prime minister, such as the Christchurch mosque shootings, COVID-19 pandemic and 2022 Wellington protest. It also includes more minor events such as being approached by a critic of hers in a public bathroom and the language development of her daughter. The book also covers the imposter syndrome and "confidence gap" that Ardern experienced and argues that imposter syndrome and confidence gaps can benefit leaders experiencing them.

In the memoir, Ardern revealed that she first seriously considered resigning in late 2022 when a doctor discovered a lump in her breast, due to the possibility that it was cancerous. It was not cancer. Ardern also revealed in the book that she was pregnant during the coalition negotiations.

== See also ==
- Prime Minister (2025 film), a documentary film about Ardern
