= Roger Blackley =

New Zealand art historian, author, and curator (1953–2019)

- Born: Roger Allan Blackley; 1953; Masterton, New Zealand
- Died: 15 May 2019 (aged 65); Wellington, New Zealand

Academic background
- Education: University of Auckland – MA; Victoria University of Wellington – PhD
- Thesis: The galleries of Maoriland: Māori portraits, ethnological art, and the culture of the curio 1880–1910 (2016)

Academic work
- Discipline: New Zealand art history
- Institutions: Auckland City Art Gallery; Victoria University of Wellington

Roger Allan Blackley (29 July 1953 – 15 May 2019) was a New Zealand art historian, author, and curator. He was a noted authority on the work of artist C. F. Goldie.

== Early life and education ==
Blackley was born in Masterton in 1953. He studied art history at the University of Auckland, graduating Master of Arts with first-class honours. During his time at the university, he was a member of the Auckland Gay Liberation Front, describing himself as a "radical gay" who believed it was "too late for liberalism, because gay means more than just who you screw - it's a whole lifestyle." His 1978 master's thesis Writing Alfred Sharpe was a study of the painting and writing of the 19th-century landscape artist Alfred Sharpe.

== Career ==
From 1983 to 1998, Blackley was the curator of historical New Zealand art at Auckland Art Gallery, and in 1992, his MA thesis was published as the exhibition catalogue to accompany the exhibition The Art of Alfred Sharpe at that gallery. Other exhibitions curated by Blackley include Two Centuries of New Zealand Landscape Art in 1990, as part of the 150th anniversary commemorations of the signing of the Treaty of Waitangi; and an exhibition of the work of Albin Martin in 1988, which toured nationally. Blackley curated two exhibitions at Adam Art Gallery: Stray Leaves: Colonial Trompe-l'oeil Drawings in 2001 and Te Mata: The Ethnological Portrait in 2008.

Blackley wrote a number of books, including the bestselling Goldie (1997). In that book, he challenged the prevailing view of art historians at the time that C. F. Goldie's portraits of Māori were racist and patronising, instead arguing that Māori held Goldie and his artistic skills in high regard and that his subjects had control over how they were portrayed by Goldie. Blackley became an expert on the works of Goldie and Gottfried Lindauer, and advised on the authenticity of those artists' works.

In 1998, Blackley was appointed as a lecturer in art history at Victoria University of Wellington, and rose to the academic rank of associate professor. He continued his curatorial activities, producing two exhibitions and accompanying catalogues for the Adam Art Gallery. His research at Victoria focused on the Victorian and Edwardian cultures of collecting, culminating in his 2016 PhD thesis and the subsequent book, Galleries of Maoriland: Artists, Collectors and the Māori World, 1880–1910, published by Auckland University Press in 2018. The book was shortlisted for the 2019 Ernest Scott Prize.

Blackley died in Wellington on 15 May 2019.

== Published works ==
Published works by Blackley include:

- Goldie (Auckland Art Gallery Toi o Tāmaki, 1997).
- Galleries of Maoriland: Artists, Collectors and the Maori World, 1880–1910 (Auckland University Press, 2018).
- Stray Leaves: Colonial Trompe L'Oeil Drawings (Victoria University Press, 2001).
- Auckland Art Gallery Toi o Tāmaki: The Guide (Auckland Art Gallery Toi o Tāmaki in association with Scala Publishers, London, 2001).
- Te Mata: The Ethnological Portrait (Adam Art Gallery and Victoria University Press, 2010).
- The Art of Alfred Sharpe (Auckland City Art Gallery and David Bateman, 1992).
