= Philip Temple =

New Zealand writer (born 1939)

Robert Philip Temple ONZM (born 1939 in Yorkshire, England) is a Dunedin-based New Zealand author of novels, children's stories, and non-fiction. His work is characterised by a strong association with the outdoors and New Zealand ecology.

== Career ==
Temple's early work was non-fiction, describing mountaineering expeditions to New Guinea and New Zealand and includes Nawok! (1962), Castles in the Air: Men and Mountains in New Zealand (1969), The Sea and the Snow: The South Indian Ocean Expedition to Heard Island (1966), and The World at Their Feet (1973).

Following this he produced a number of novels - The Explorer (1975), Stations (1979), Beak of the Moon (1981), Sam (1984), Dark of the Moon (1993), and To Each His Own (1999) - and many children's books, among which the most notable are The Legend of the Kea (1986), Kakapo, Parrot of the Night (1988), and Kotuku, Flight of the White Heron (1994). In 1980. Temple held the Robert Burns Fellowship at the University of Otago.

More recently, Temple has turned to an autobiographical relation of his own mountaineering adventures (The Last True Explorer (2002)) and a history of the Wakefield clan in New Zealand (A Sort of Conscience: The Wakefields (Auckland University Press, 2002), which won the Ernest Scott History Prize in 2003, the Ian Wards Prize for Historical Writing in 2003, and the Biography category of the 2003 Montana New Zealand Book Awards. He was also awarded the 2003 Creative New Zealand Berlin Writers' Residency and the 2005 Prime Minister’s Awards for Literary Achievement in non-fiction.

== Works ==
=== Non-fiction ===
- Nawok!: The New Zealand Expedition to New Guinea's Highest Mountains (J.M. Dent, 1962)
- The Sea and the Snow: The South Indian Ocean Expedition to Heard Island (Cassell, 1966)
- The World at Their Feet (Whitcombe & Tombs, 1969)
- Mantle of the Skies: Southern Alps of New Zealand (Whitcombe & Tombs, 1971)
- Christchurch: A City and its People (Whitcombe & Tombs, 1973)
- Castles in the Air: Men and Mountains in New Zealand (John McIndoe, 1973)
- New Zealand Explorers: Great Journeys of Discovery (Whitcoulls, 1985)
- A Sort of Conscience: The Wakefields (Auckland University Press, 2002)
- The Last True Explorer: Into Darkest New Guinea (Godwit, 2002)
- Mountain: Where the Land Touches the Sky (Penguin, 2007)
- Life As A Novel: A Biography of Maurice Shadbolt. Volume One 1932–1973 (David Ling, 2018)

=== Novels ===
- The Explorer (Hodder & Stoughton, 1975)
- Stations (Collins, 1979)
- Beak of the Moon (Collins, 1981)
- Sam (Hodder & Stoughton, 1984)
- Dark of the Moon (1993)
- To Each His Own (Hazard, 1999)
- White Shadows, Memories of Marienbad (Vintage, 2005)
- I Am Always With You (Vintage, 2006)
- MiStory (Frontpublishing, 2014)

=== Children's literature ===
- The Legend of the Kea (1986)
- Kakapo, Parrot of the Night (1988)
- Kotuku, Flight of the White Heron (1994)
