= Glenn Colquhoun =

New Zealand poet and general practitioner

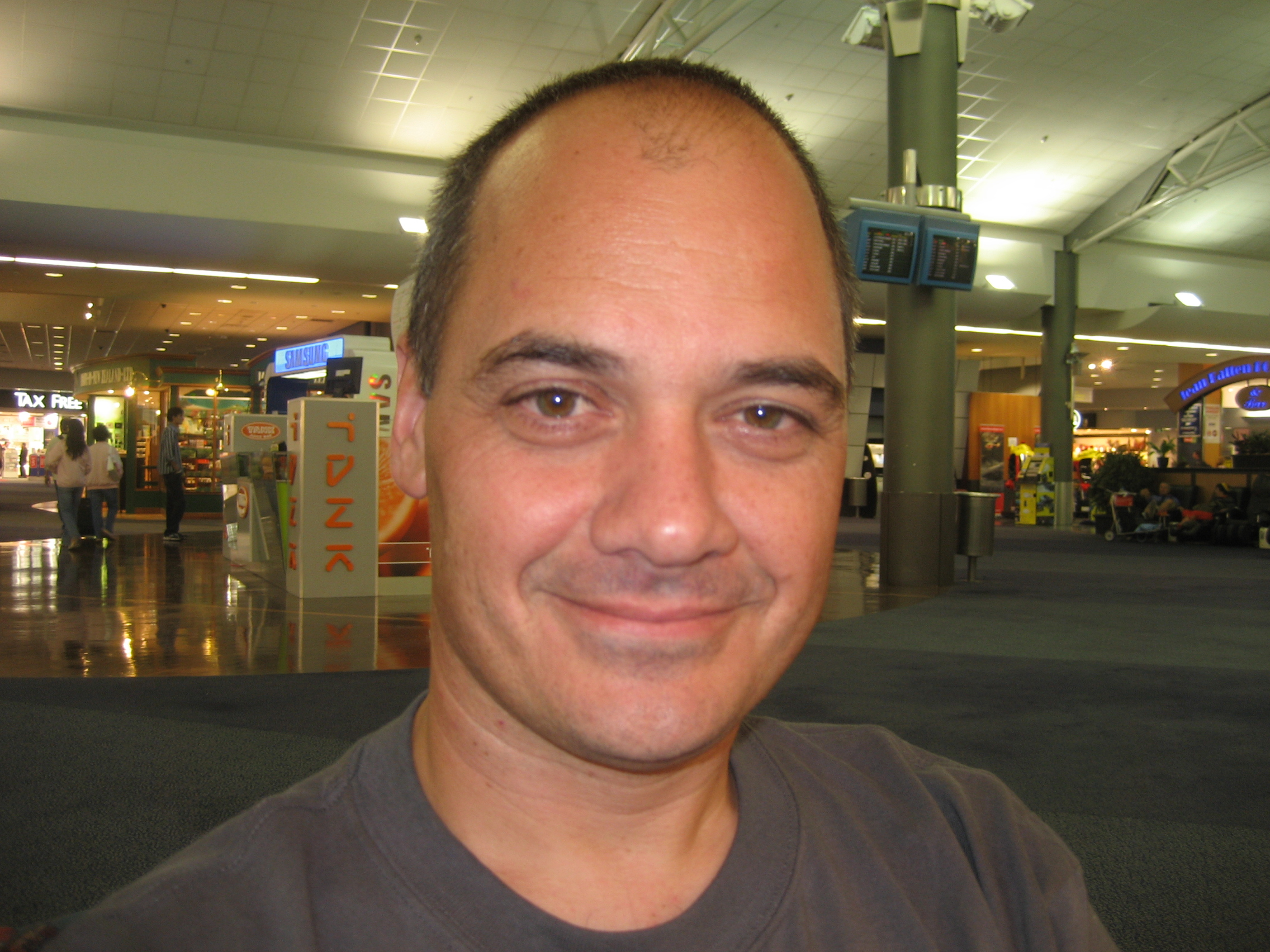
- Born: 1964 (age 61–62)
- Occupations: Writer; general practitioner

Glenn Morton Colquhoun (born 1964) is a New Zealand poet and general practitioner.

== Life ==
Colquhoun was born in Papakura, Auckland. He attended the University of Auckland medical school graduating in 1997 with an MB ChB. He practises medicine on the Kāpiti Coast. He lives in Waikawa Beach.

Colquhoun's first book of poems, The Art of Walking Upright, was published in 1999. It has been said the book is a love letter to the people of Te Tii, the Northland town where he was living at that time. An Explanation of Poetry to My Father was published and written in 2001. Written in the middle of his work on Playing God, the book was a distraction for Colquhoun from that work. The poems are an explanation of why the son of a builder would go and write poetry. Playing God, Colquhuoun’s third book, was published in 2002 to critical acclaim and popular support. It has sold over 10,000 copies in New Zealand and in 2007 was published in the United Kingdom. How We Fell (2006) is a collection of love poems written to Colquhoun’s ex-wife. It is the candid story of a ten-year relationship. North South (illustrated by Nigel Brown, 2009), is a sequence of poems entwining aspects of Irish mythology with aspects of Māori mythology.

In 2010, Colquhoun was awarded a Fulbright scholarship to research medical storytelling programmes.

In October 2012, he wanted to participate in the Transit of Venus poetry exchange at the Frankfurt Book Fair in Germany.

== Awards ==
Colquhoun's first book, The Art of Walking Upright, won the Montana New Zealand Book Awards Jessie Mackay Award for Best First Book of Poetry.

Playing God was published in December 2002. The work received the Montana Award for Poetry and the Montana Readers' Choice Award at the 2003 Montana New Zealand Book Awards. He was the first poet to be awarded the Readers' Choice Award in a readers' vote. In October 2006, Playing God went platinum with Booksellers New Zealand, making its way onto their premier New Zealand bestsellers list. It is the only poetry collection in New Zealand to make it to platinum, meaning more than 5,000 copies of the book have been sold.

Colquhoun was the convenor of the 2004 New Zealand Post Book Awards for Children and Young Adults. Also in 2004, he received the country’s largest literary award, the Prize in Modern Letters, worth $60,000.

== Published poetry ==
- "WHEN I AM IN DOUBT"; "TODAY I DO NOT WANT TO BE A DOCTOR"; "IN OTHER WORDS"; "TO THE GIRL WHO STOOD BESIDE ME AT THE CHECK-OUT COUNTER OF WHITCOULL'S BOOKSTORE IN HAMILTON ON TUESDAY"; "AN EXPLANATION OF POETRY TO MY FATHER"; "A MINI MENTAL STATUS EXAMINATION"; "A HISTORY"; "THE OTHER SIDE OF A RIVER", Beyond the Pale
- The Art of Walking Upright. Steele Roberts Ltd. 1999. ISBN 978-1-877228-20-9.
- An Explanation of Poetry to My Father. Steele Roberts. 2001. ISBN 978-1-877228-44-5.
- Playing God: Poems about Medicine. Hammersmith Press Limited. 2002. ISBN 978-1-905140-16-9. reissued 2007
- How We Fell. Steele Roberts. 2006. ISBN 978-1-877338-91-5.
- North South. Steele Roberts. 2009. ISBN 978-1-877448-63-8.

== Other works ==
- Jumping Ship. Steele Roberts Aotearoa. 2012. ISBN 978-1-877577-76-5. (essays and poems)
- Uncle Glenn and Me, 1999 (children’s picturebook)
- Uncle Glenn and Me Too. Illustrator Kevin Wildman. Penguin Group New Zealand, Limited. 2004. ISBN 978-1-86948-697-6. (children’s picturebook)
- Mr Short, Mr Thin, Mr Bald and Mr Dog. Illustrator Nikki Slade Robinson. Steele Roberts Publishing Limited. 2005. ISBN 978-1-877338-57-1. (children’s picturebook)
- Jumping Ship. Four Winds Press. 2004. ISBN 978-0-9582514-2-6. (essay)
