= Jessie Mackay =

New Zealand poet, journalist and activist

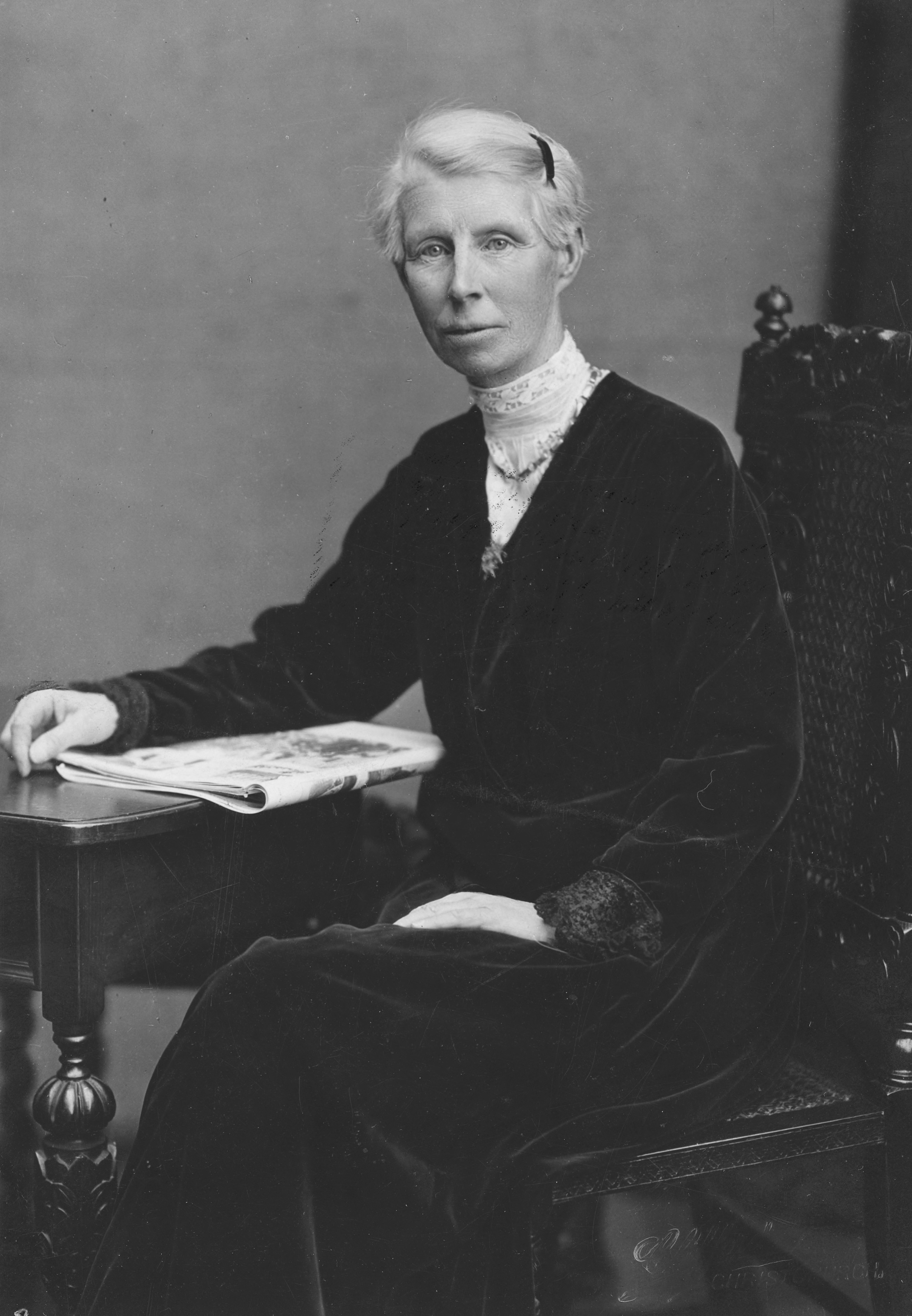
- Mackay in c. 1929
- Born: 15 December 1864; Rakaia, New Zealand
- Died: 23 August 1938 (aged 73); Christchurch, New Zealand
- Resting place: Waimairi Cemetery
- Occupations: Poet; journalist

Jessie Mackay (15 December 1864 – 23 August 1938) was a New Zealand poet, journalist, feminist and animal rights activist. She is often referred to as New Zealand's first local-born poet and was one of the earliest writers to have a distinctly New Zealand style.

== Biography ==
Mackay was born in 1864 in Rakaia. Her Scottish parents were the shepherd (later station manager) Robert Mackay and his wife, Elizabeth Mackay (née Ormiston), and she was the eldest of a large family of daughters. She was homeschooled until she was 14 and went to Christchurch to train as a teacher, and taught at small rural schools from 1887 until 1898. She moved to Dunedin in 1898, and worked as a journalist for the Otago Witness for four years.

Mackay's first volume of poetry, The Spirit of the Rangatira, was published in 1889, and she published three more volumes over the next two decades: The Sitter on the Rail (1891), From the Maori Sea (1908) and Land of the Morning (1909). As a poet, she is best known for her ballads based on Scottish legends, even though her first and only visit to Scotland did not take place until 1921. Her poems also had feminist themes and references to Māori myths and customs. The most famous poem of her first collection was "The Charge at Parihaka", a parody of "The Charge of the Light Brigade" by Tennyson, in which she condemned the British government's actions at Parihaka.

In 1902, Mackay moved to Christchurch where she lived with her sister Georgina. She was forced in 1904 to abandon her teaching career due to illness. In 1906, she was appointed as the "lady editor" of the Canterbury Times. Her work at this time was published in the short-lived New Zealand literary magazine New Zealand Illustrated Magazine (founded in Auckland in 1899, last publication 1905). After the closure of the Canterbury Times in 1917 she began writing freelance for other publications such as the White Ribbon, the journal of the Women's Christian Temperance Union of New Zealand, and for several British feminist journals. Her poetry was also published in a number of New Zealand newspapers.

In late 1921 Mackay travelled to Europe, and in January 1922 she attended the Irish Race Convention in Paris on behalf of the New Zealand Society for Self-Determination for Ireland. She was an advocate of home rule for both Scotland and Ireland. Mackay's two final volumes of poetry were published after this visit: The Bride of the Rivers (1926) and Vigil (1935). In 1934, a presentation of a testimonial letter and cheque was made to her in Christchurch. The letter bore more than 300 signatures from New Zealand, Australia and England, and opened with: "In the literary history of our country there is no name more honoured than yours". She was praised for having built a literary tradition in New Zealand, and for her "reforming zeal, which has expressed itself in a life-long allegiance to many causes". The New Zealand government awarded her a pension in 1936 in recognition of her contribution to New Zealand literature.

Her papers are held by the National Library of New Zealand. In 1939 the New Zealand Society of Authors (PEN NZ) established the Jessie Mackay Poetry Prize and it has been awarded annually to a leading New Zealand poet ever since. As of 2020 it forms part of the Ockham New Zealand Book Awards. Her poetry was included in a number of notable anthologies during her lifetime and in a 1956 anthology, but was omitted from the Penguin Book of New Zealand Verse (1960) edited by Allen Curnow.

== Activism ==
Mackay actively campaigned for women's rights, animal rights, and national liberation movements, particularly through her journalism. She took part in the women's suffrage movement in New Zealand in the late 19th century, including through collecting signatures for petitions, and supported causes such as the need for women in Parliament, better pay for women and women in the police force. She was also a member of the National Council of Women of New Zealand and was instrumental in its 1918 revival. It was said by her contemporaries that she was "among the first of those who realised that to limit the feminine intellect to the sphere of the home would deprive society of a great creative and regenerative power".

Mackay stopped eating meat in the early 20th century because of her compassion for animals. In 1911, Mackay and her sister kept a vegetarian house in New Brighton. Mackay refused to wear feathers and fur. She condemned the fur trade and hunting. In the early 1920s Mackay condemned animal experiments and vivisection as unethical in newspaper articles.

== Works ==
- The Spirit of the Rangatira and other ballads. Melbourne: George Robertson & Company. 1889.
- The Sitter on the Rail and other poems. Christchurch: Simpson and Williams, 1891.
- From the Maori Sea. Christchurch: Whitcombe and Tombs, 1908.
- Land of the Morning. Christchurch: Whitcombe and Tombs, 1909.
- The Bride of the Rivers and other verses. Christchurch: Simpson and Williams, 1926.
- Vigil. Auckland: Whitcombe and Tombs, 1935

== Sources ==
- Macleod, N. F. H. A Voice on the Wind. Wellington: Reed, 1955.
- Roberts, Heather. "Mackay, Jessie 1864-1938". Dictionary of New Zealand Biography. Ministry for Culture and Heritage.
- Margaret Chapman, Jessie Mackay: a woman before her time, Kakahu W.D.F.F., 1997, ISBN 978-0-473-04794-8
