= David Coventry =

New Zealand author and musician

David Henry Halford Coventry
- Born: Wellington, New Zealand
- Writing career
- Years active: 2010 –
- Genre: Literary Fiction
- Website: davidhhcoventry.com

David Henry Halford Coventry (born 2 October 1969, Wellington) is a New Zealand born author and musician. Published in six different languages, his debut novel, The Invisible Mile (2015), was the winner of the 2016 Hubert Church Award for Fiction, shortlisted for both the Ockham New Zealand Book Award and the Sports Book Awards in the United Kingdom.

== Education ==
A former musician, sound engineer and film archivist, Coventry attended Hutt Valley High School from 1983 to 1986, has a BA in English literature and Religious studies (Victoria University of Wellington, 2000), an Honours Degree in English Literature (VUW, 2001) and a Masters in Creative Writing from the International Institute of Modern Letters (VUW, 2010). In 2022 he received a Doctorate of Philosophy from Victoria University for his thesis exploring ME/CFS.

== Writing ==
Coventry's novel, The Invisible Mile, set during the 1928 Tour de France was described in The Sydney Morning Herald as its pick of the Week: "David Coventry's poetic odyssey relates ... with symbolic force and poetic finesse." The New York Times included it in its book of the week section, stating the book is "Gorgeous.... Coventry's brooding narrative, in varying parts philosophical action-adventure, travelogue, family drama, war chronicle and psychological puzzler, is suffused with the ever-querying perspective of its haunted central character." A review in Auckland's Metro Magazine said it was "A dream to read, in all senses of the word.... A trance-like account of the 1928 Tour de France . . . The writing is fierce, a bravura mix of narcissism, masochism and lyricism grounded in the honesty of the unnamed rider's journey into his self and the dawning realisation that the race has become a grand metaphor for the trauma of World War I." Brian Clearkin at Landfall wrote: "a brilliant tour de force of writing talent and style that richly rewards the reader. [P]laces David Coventry among the elite of New Zealand authors." Coventry's work has been compared in The Brooklyn Rail to that of Don DeLillo, Toni Morrison and Thomas Mann.

Coventry's second novel, Dance Prone, explores trauma, art and 1980s' post-hardcore punk rock. It was published in 2020.

Coventry's third novel, Performance, which explores life and writing under the conditions of ME/CFS, was published in June 2024.

He lives on the Banks Peninsula, New Zealand.

== Awards and appearances ==
Coventry was the 2015 recipient of the Todd New Writer's Bursary. He appeared at the 2016 Edinburgh International Book Festival, The International Festival of Authors in Toronto (2017), the New Zealand Festival's Writer's Week in session with Lloyd Geering (2016), the Auckland Writers Festival (2016), and the Nelson Arts Festival (2016). In 2022 Coventry's Doctoral thesis was placed on the Victoria University of Wellington's Dean's List. Coventry was the 2022 Ursula Bethell Writer in Residence at University of Canterbury. He was the 2026 Kaipukahu University of Waikato Writer in Residence where he worked on his collection of short stories, Athletes.

== Literary works ==
- The Invisible Mile (2015)
- Dance Prone (2020)
- Performance (2024)

== Music and engineering ==
As a sound engineer he has produced works for the experimental groups Thela, La Gloria and Empirical The later pair as a contributing musician.
