= Otago University Press =

Academic publisher in New Zealand

Otago University Press (abbreviated OUP; Māori: Te Whare Tā o Ōtākou Whakaihu Waka) is an academic publisher associated with the University of Otago in Dunedin, New Zealand. Established in 1958, it is the country’s oldest academic publisher.

== History ==
OUP began as a modest publishing venture run from the University of Otago Library under librarian Peter Havard-Williams, working with Dunedin printer John McIndoe Ltd. Its first title was Greek Art and Literature 770–530 BC (1959), published under the imprint University of Otago Press. For several decades the Press produced a small number of scholarly works annually under the oversight of successive University librarians.

In 1993, the Press appointed its first full-time managing editor, Wendy Harrex, and expanded its publishing programme in the humanities and social sciences.

By 2006 the Press had a refined name, Otago University Press. From its early monographs and pamphlets, the list had evolved into substantial, often illustrated works that found readers well beyond academia.

Today OUP publishes around 18 new titles each year including poetry and non-fiction across the arts, humanities and sciences, alongside the long-running literary journal Landfall Tauraka (formerly Landfall).

== Recognition ==
Otago University Press has had several books win at the Ockham New Zealand Book Awards, including Liar, Liar, Lick, Spit by Emma Neale for the Mary and Peter Biggs Award for Poetry in 2025, At the Point of Seeing by Megan Kitching for the Jessie Mackay Prize for Poetry in 2024, Tumble by Joanna Preston for the Mary and Peter Biggs Award for Poetry in 2022, and Hudson & Halls: The Food of Love by Joanne Drayton for the Royal Society Te Apārangi Award for General Non-Fiction in 2019.

In 2023, two OUP poetry collections received international recognition under the UK-based Laurel Prize for environmental poetry: Tung by Robyn Maree Pickens was awarded third place, and At the Point of Seeing by Megan Kitching won the Best International First Collection award.

== Editorial board ==
As of 2024, the editorial board comprises:

- Dr Sue Wootton (Publisher)
- Professor Chris Brickell
- Honorary Associate Professor Chris Prentice (Chair)
- Professor Michael Reilly
- Professor Nicola Wheen
- Associate Professor Paerau Warbrick
- Associate Professor Frances Steel
- Dr Zac McIvor
- Professor Rachael McLean
