= Diana Wichtel =

New Zealand author, journalist and cultural critic

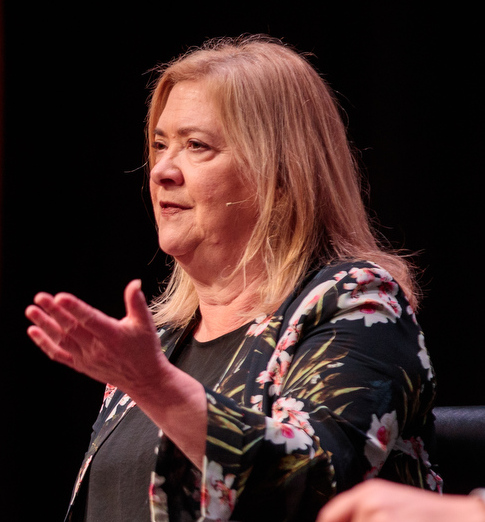
Diana Wichtel (2018).

Diana Wichtel (born 1950 in Vancouver) is a New Zealand writer and critic. Her mother, Patricia, was a New Zealander; her father, Benjamin Wichtel, a Polish Jew who escaped from the Nazi train taking his family to the Treblinka extermination camp in World War II. When she was 13 her mother brought her to New Zealand to live, along with her two siblings. Although he was expected to follow, she never saw her father again. The mystery of her father's life took years to unravel, and is recounted in Wichtel's award-winning book Driving to Treblinka. The book has been called "a masterpiece" by New Zealand writer Steve Braunias. New Zealand columnist Margo White wrote: "This is a story that reminds readers of the atrocities that ordinary people did to each other, the effect on those who survived, and the reverberations felt through following generations."

Driving to Treblinka won the Royal Society Te Apārangi Award for General non-fiction at the 2018 Ockham New Zealand Book Awards.

Wichtel was appointed staff writer at the New Zealand Listener in 1984. She joined the magazine from the English department at the University of Auckland, where she gained a Master in Arts, and also tutored. She has won many awards for her television criticism, profiles and feature writing. The New Zealand cultural critic and author Adam Dudding has written of Wichtel's "genius" for television reviewing: "Her reviews often strike a tone of tolerant bemusement; she's a visitor from Mars bearing witness to the latest bonkers manifestation of modern culture." Wichtel was still writing for the Listener when its then publisher announced the magazine's closure in April 2020.

The New Zealand Herald's weekend magazine Canvas welcomed Wichtel as a fortnightly columnist in October 2020.

== Personal life ==
Wichtel has been married twice and has two children. She is currently married to journalist Chris Barton. Her previous husband was television presenter Philip Alpers.

== Awards ==
Wichtel has won numerous awards for her journalism:

- 2001 Qantas Media Awards: Best Magazine Columnist: The Arts - Creative New Zealand Award.
- 2011 Canon Media Awards Best Magazine Feature Writer Politics
- 2011 Canon Media Awards Best Magazine Feature Writer Arts
- 2012 Canon Media Awards: Magazine Feature Writer Arts and Entertainment.
- 2013 Canon Media Awards: Reviewer of the Year
- 2019 Voyager Media Awards Reviewer of the Year
- 2016 Grimshaw Sargeson fellow
- 2018 Royal Society Te Apārangi Award for General non-fiction: Ockham New Zealand Book Awards.
