= John Mitchell (historian) =

New Zealand historian (1941–2021)

- Born: Maui John Mitchell; 20 May 1941; Tākaka, New Zealand
- Died: 23 September 2021 (aged 80); Nelson, New Zealand
- Spouse: Hilary Fahey (m. 1966)
- Relatives: Terry Mitchell (brother)

Academic background
- Education: University of Canterbury
- Thesis: Some Psychological Aspects of Chemical Senses (1971)
- Doctoral advisor: Robert Gregson

Academic work
- Discipline: History
- Sub-discipline: New Zealand Māori history

Maui John Mitchell (20 May 1941 – 23 September 2021) was a New Zealand historian who specialised in Māori history, particularly in the upper South Island. Of Māori descent, he affiliated to Te Āti Awa and Ngāti Tama. Mitchell completed a master's thesis in 1967, followed by a doctoral thesis in 1971, both at the University of Canterbury.

He died on 23 September 2021 in Nelson.

== Selected publications ==
- Mitchell, John; Mitchell, Hilary (2004). Te Tau Ihu o te Waka: a History of Māori of Nelson and Marlborough. Vol. 1. Huia. ISBN 1869690877.
- Mitchell, Hilary; Mitchell, John (2021). He Ringatoi o ngā Tūpuna: Isaac Coates and his Māori Portraits. Nelson: Potton & Burton. ISBN 9781988550206.
