= Amy Head =

New Zealand author (born 1976)

Amy Head (born 1976) is a New Zealand writer.

== Biography ==
Head was born in Papakura, Auckland in 1976. She studied at the University of Canterbury, graduating with a Bachelor of Arts; she then completed a Master of Arts with Distinction in creative writing from Victoria University, Wellington.

Head's short story collection, Tough (VUP, 2014), was awarded the New Zealand Society of Authors’ Hubert Church Best First Book Award for Fiction.
