= Jane Ussher =

New Zealand photographer (born 1953)

Jane Ussher MNZM
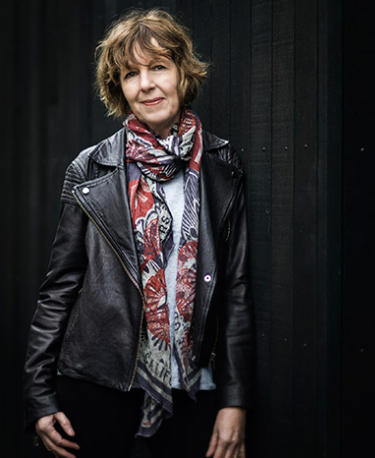
- Born: Philippa Jane Ussher; 1953 (age 72–73); Dunedin, New Zealand
- Education: Wellington Polytechnic
- Known for: Photography
- Spouse: Grant Gallagher

Philippa Jane Ussher MNZM (born 1953) is a New Zealand documentary and portrait photographer. She joined the New Zealand Listener in 1977 and was chief photographer for 29 years, leaving to take up a career as a freelance photographer and author.

== Exhibitions and publications ==
Jane Ussher was born in Dunedin in 1953. She describes herself as leaving school unsure of what to do, and taking a photography course at Wellington Polytechnic, which "felt exactly right. It suited every aspect of my temperament. I couldn't have found anything better." She studied photography at Wellington Polytechnic from 1975–76, and was the first student to be offered a second-year scholarship. The first camera she owned was a Hasselblad, using 24-image 120 film, purchased off a fellow student.

Ussher joined the staff of the Listener in 1977 as chief photographer, and over nearly 30 years documented New Zealand culture. She first gained acclaim for her 1984 exhibition of New Zealand sporting personality portraits, The Olympians. This success led to a prolific career mainly focusing on portrait photography, some collected in the book Jane Ussher Portraits, launched in 2004 to coincide with the Listener's 65th anniversary. The book includes many acclaimed portraits from the Listener of major New Zealand figures, ranging from sport stars (Jonah Lomu, Edmund Hillary), to prime ministers (Helen Clark, David Lange, Robert Muldoon) to actors such as Russell Crowe, Sam Neill. She continued to shoot on film while at the Listener, despite the cost, and was a relatively late adopter of digital photography.

In 2008 Ussher left the Listener to become a freelancer, and accepted an invitation from Prime Minister Helen Clark to travel to Antarctica with the Antarctica New Zealand Media Programme. She spent four weeks over the summer of 2008–2009 photographing the three historic huts that served as bases for Scott and Shackleton's pioneering expeditions. A series of photographs from this trip were published as Still Life: Inside the Antarctic Huts of Scott and Shackleton. The book was launched by then New Zealand Prime Minister John Key October 2010. In 2017 she was invited to speak on her Antarctic photography at TEDxScottBase, an event broadcast worldwide.

Ussher uses a Hasselblad medium-format digital camera, on a tripod with long exposures, preferring to shoot outside in natural light. Her work has been displayed many times at leading museums such as Te Papa in Wellington and Auckland Museum. These exhibitions have showcased both her photography and more recently audiovisual experiences. She is considered New Zealand's foremost portrait photographer.

== Books ==
- Kidman, Fiona; Ussher, Jane (1984). Going North. Auckland, New Zealand: Heinemann. ISBN 0868634115.
- Ussher, Jane (2004). Stirling, Pamela (ed.). Jane Ussher Portraits. Auckland, New Zealand: Random House. ISBN 978-1-86941-650-8.
- Ussher, Jane (2010). Still Life: Inside the Antarctic Huts of Scott and Shackleton. Nigel Watson (text). Auckland, New Zealand: Murdoch Books. ISBN 978-1-74196-739-5. (Finalist in the 2011 New Zealand Post Book Awards: Illustrated Non-Fiction)
- McLeod, Rosemary (2013). With Bold Needle & Thread: Adventures in Vintage Needlecraft. Jane Ussher (photography). Auckland, New Zealand: Random House NZ. ISBN 978-1-86979-816-1.
- Ansley, Bruce (2013). Coast: a New Zealand Journey. Jane Ussher (photography). Auckland, New Zealand: Random House NZ. ISBN 978-1-86979-943-4. OCLC 1083742812. (Winner in the 2014 Ockham New Zealand Book Awards: Illustrated Non-Fiction)
- Moon, Paul (2015). Face to Face: Conversations with Remarkable New Zealanders. Jane Ussher (photography). Auckland, New Zealand: Penguin Books. ISBN 978-0-14357-144-5.
- McKay, Bill (2015). Worship: a history of New Zealand church design. Jane Ussher (photography). Auckland, New Zealand: Random House NZ. ISBN 978-1-77553-836-3. OCLC 922333752.
- Ansley, Bruce; Ussher, Jane (2016). Islands: a New Zealand Journey. Auckland, New Zealand: Penguin. ISBN 978-1-77553-846-2. (Longlisted for the 2017 New Zealand Post Book Awards)
- Coddington, Deborah (2018). The New Zealand Horse. Jane Ussher (photography). Auckland, New Zealand: Massey University Press. ISBN 978-0-9951029-2-7. OCLC 1047644968. (Longlisted for the Ockham New Zealand Book Awards)
- Watson, Nigel (2018). Hillary's Antarctica. Jane Ussher (photography). Sydney: Allen & Unwin. ISBN 978-1-76063-782-8. OCLC 1059365803.
- Ussher, Jane (2020). Nature — Stilled. Auckland: Te Papa Press. ISBN 978-0-9951136-9-5. (Shortlisted for 2021 Ockham New Zealand book awards)
- Beattie, James (2020). House of Treasures. Jane Ussher (photography). Canterbury: Canterbury Museum. ISBN 9780473522926.
- Millar, Debra (2020). Homesteads: The Story of New Zealand's Grand Country Houses. Jane Ussher (photography). Auckland: Point Publishing Ltd. ISBN 9780473523626.
- Walsh, Frances (2020). Endless Sea. Jane Ussher (photography). Auckland: Massey University Press. ISBN 978-0-9951318-7-3. (Longlisted for 2021 Ockham New Zealand book awards)
- Ussher, Jane (2022). Rooms. John Walsh (text). Auckland: Massey University Press. ISBN 9781991016171.
- Ussher, Jane (2024). Woolsheds. Annette O'Sullivan (text). Massey University Press. ISBN 9781991016829. (Shortlisted for 2024 ReadingRoom literary awards)
- Ussher, Jane (2024). Bold Types. Deborah Coddington, Jemma Moreira (text). UGLY HILL PRESS. ISBN 9781991016782.
- Ussher, Jane (2025). Olveston. John Walsh (text). Massey University Press. ISBN 9781991016782.

== Personal life ==
Ussher is married to publisher Grant Gallagher and has a son; she lives in Auckland.

== Honours and awards ==
- Best Portrait at the 2006 Qantas Media Awards
- In the 2009 Queen's Birthday Honours, Ussher was appointed a Member of the New Zealand Order of Merit, for services to photography
- Inducted in 2009 into the Massey University hall of fame
- 2014 NZ Post Book Awards illustrated non-fiction prize for Coast: a New Zealand Journey
