= Arno Gasteiger =

Arno Gasteiger is a photographer. He is a main contributor to New Zealand Geographic magazine.

== Life and career ==
He was born in Austria and moved to New Zealand in 1988 to live and work.

He works as a freelance photographer specialising in location-photography for editorial and commercial clients. From his base in Auckland, he covers the South Pacific, New Zealand and Australia. Commercial clients include Fletcher Challenge, Mainzeal and Ports of Auckland. Arno's work is exhibited in Australia, New Zealand, Austria and Germany. His most recent exhibition was on Tā moko (the art of Maori tattooing) and shown at the Auckland Museum.

== Awards ==
Gasteiger picked up several awards and assignments from international magazines, including Smithsonian, Marie Claire, The New York Times, Der Spiegel and GEO (Germany & France).

== Books ==
He is the author of five books. Central, a book on Otago, won the Spectrum Print Design Awards and the illustrative category in the 2004 Montana Book Awards.
