= The Invisible Mile =

2015 novel by David Coventry

- First edition (publ. Victoria University Press)
- Author: David Coventry
- Language: English
- Publication date: 2015

The Invisible Mile is the 2015 debut novel by New Zealand writer, David Coventry. The novel is a re-imagining of the 1928 Tour de France narrated in first-person by a fictional rider. The novel was a bestseller in New Zealand and the winner of the 2016 Hubert Church Award for Fiction. The novel has been translated into German, Spanish, Danish, Hebrew and Dutch. Critically acclaimed in New Zealand the novel has been named a book of the year in publications in the UK, Netherlands and New Zealand. Whilst it was also named as pick of the week in The Sydney Morning Herald and the New York Times Review of Books.

== Style and themes ==
As described in the Sydney Morning Herald, the novel depicts its "odyssey with symbolic force and poetic finesse." In doing so the novel creates its own legends around the riders and pays homage to ancestral competitors. A major theme in the novel is the individual's encounter with the trauma and opacity of a present, yet inaccessible, history and how this drives mythology. Here, personal history is inescapably connected to the shifting occurrences which mold modernity. Coventry has been quoted as saying "My motivation to write the book was not cycling. Cycling was a perfect way to get lost in the language of war and the memory of war." Indeed, the "suffering of these athletes (many of whom, save for the unnamed narrator, are based on real-life figures) resonates with their shared trauma from a war that played out just 10 years earlier.... In varying parts philosophical action-adventure, travelogue, family drama, war chronicle and psychological puzzler, is suffused with the ever-querying perspective of its haunted central character." In regard to the symbolic drive of the novel, Coventry has stated "The book is not trying to be a metaphor for the war, but for remembering the war."

== Reception ==
The New York Times stated the book is "Gorgeous.... Coventry’s brooding narrative, in varying parts philosophical action-adventure, travelogue, family drama, war chronicle and psychological puzzler, is suffused with the ever-querying perspective of its haunted central character."

The Brooklyn Rail described the novel as "Masterful..... Coventry breaks the rules, every one he can find, and learns a higher music. What emerges is a novel in the tradition of Don DeLillo (Libra), Toni Morrison (Beloved) and Thomas Mann (Doctor Faustus), writers who try to think through the way history takes hold of the individual, the almost demonic violence inspired by the place where people and events meet. These are books with a metaphysical heft." The Guardian described it as "a literary novel of the highest order."

Critically acclaimed in New Zealand, the novel has been described as "[O]ne of the most gruelling novels about sport ever written in New Zealand. But it’s quite a bit more than this . . . A truly extraordinary first novel." Whilst Kiran Dass of The New Zealand Herald wrote "... it's such an accomplished and beautifully refined novel. It almost makes other writers look like they're just mucking around." Brian Clearkin at Landfall wrote: "a brilliant tour de force of writing talent and style that richly rewards the reader. I leave it to you to decide whether or not this debut effort immediately places David Coventry among the elite of New Zealand authors."[19] With Olivia Macassey at Takahē magazine stating "Coventry seems to have arrived fully-formed in our literary landscape with this fascinating debut."
