= Eric McCormick =

New Zealand historian

Eric McCormick

Eric Hall McCormick (17 June 1906 – 23 March 1995) was a New Zealand teacher, critic, historian, university lecturer and biographer.

== Life and career ==
McCormick was born in Taihape, Wanganui. He attended Wellington College, Wellington, as a boarder, and then studied at the Teachers' Training College, Wellington, and Victoria University College. He continued his studies at Victoria while teaching at rural schools near Nelson, eventually graduating Master of Arts in English and Latin. In the early 1930s he studied at Clare College, Cambridge.

Of McCormick's first book, Letters and Art in New Zealand (1940), the reviewer for the Auckland Star declared that of all the books published in New Zealand's centennial year of 1940, none was "so rich in information not otherwise easily accessible, or so likely to increase understanding of the social changes which the Dominion has known", and concluded that it was "an excellent piece of work of which New Zealand until now has stood much in need". The historian Keith Sinclair later described it as "a work of such discrimination and scholarship as at once to establish the author as the first of his countrymen entitled to be called critic".

McCormick served with the New Zealand Army in the Middle East during World War II, at first as a medical orderly but later as a war archivist. He rose to the rank of captain, and on his return to New Zealand in 1945 he was appointed chief war archivist.

In 1947, McCormick was appointed senior lecturer in English at Auckland University College. He resigned in 1951 to take up a two-year University of New Zealand senior research fellowship. Later in the 1950s he became an independent scholar, living frugally in the Auckland suburb of Green Bay with his sister Myra.

== Books ==
- Making New Zealand: Pictorial Surveys of a Century (1939–40; he edited this 30-volume series)
- Letters and Art in New Zealand (1940)
- New Zealand, a Colony of the Mind (1945)
- Poetry in New Zealand (1947)
- The Later Novel (1947)
- The Expatriate: A Study of Frances Hodgkins (1954)
- The Voice of a Silent Land: New Zealand Writing (1955)
- Eric Lee-Johnson (1956)
- The Inland Eye: A Sketch in Visual Autobiography (1959)
- New Zealand Literature: A Survey (1959)
- Tasman and New Zealand: A Bibliographical Study (1959)
- The Fascinating Folly: Dr Hocken and His Fellow Collectors (1961)
- Alexander Turnbull: His Life, His Circle, His Collections (1974)
- Omai: Pacific Envoy (1977)
- Portrait of Frances Hodgkins (1981)
- The Friend of Keats: A Life of Charles Armitage Brown (1989)
- An Absurd Ambition: Autobiographical Writings (1996; edited by Dennis McEldowney)

Writing, a New Country: A Collection of Essays Presented to E. H. McCormick in His 88th Year is a 1993 festschrift of 16 essays by 16 authors.
