= New Zealand Society of Authors =

Organization in New Zealand

New Zealand Society of Authors Te Puni Kaituhi o Aotearoa PEN NZ
- Formation: 1934
- Type: Advocate for New Zealand writers
- Location: Auckland
- Region served: New Zealand
- Members: 1,810 (2022)
- Chief Executive: Jenny Nagle
- Key people: Mandy Hager (National President)
- Website: www.authors.org.nz
- Formerly called: New Zealand PEN Centre

The New Zealand Society of Authors Te Puni Kaituhi o Aotearoa (PEN New Zealand Inc.) promotes and protects the interests of New Zealand writers. It was founded as the New Zealand PEN Centre (Poets, Essays and Novelists) in 1934. It broadened its scope and became the New Zealand Society of Authors in 1994, under the presidency of writer Philip Temple.

There are eight branches covering all regions of New Zealand. Branches were established in Wellington and Auckland first, and later in Otago and Canterbury.

The Otago Branch was established in Dunedin in 1982 under the leadership of writer and artist Christodoulos Moisa, who had moved to there from Auckland. He was helped by poet Graham Lindsay. Moisa had been nominated for membership by Auckland Star editor and writer David Ballantyne and Prof. Bernard Brown before he left Auckland to live in Dunedin. The branch used to meet once a month in the staffroom of the Hocken Building, where Moisa worked as an artist on the Ban Nadi Archeological project of the Otago University Department of Anthropology. Among its first members were Graham Lindsay, Hone Tuwhare (poet), Bill Dean (lecturer of English), Peter Olds (poet), Owen Marshall (writer) and Cilla McQueen (poet).

The Canterbury Branch was established in Christchurch in 1984 under the leadership of Moisa, who had moved to the city from Dunedin. It met once a month at the Media Club Rooms in Armagh Street and in various other venues around Christchurch. Among its first members were Margaret Mahy, Gavin Bishop, Elsie Locke, Michael Harlow and Glenn Busch.
