= Auckland University Press =

New Zealand publisher

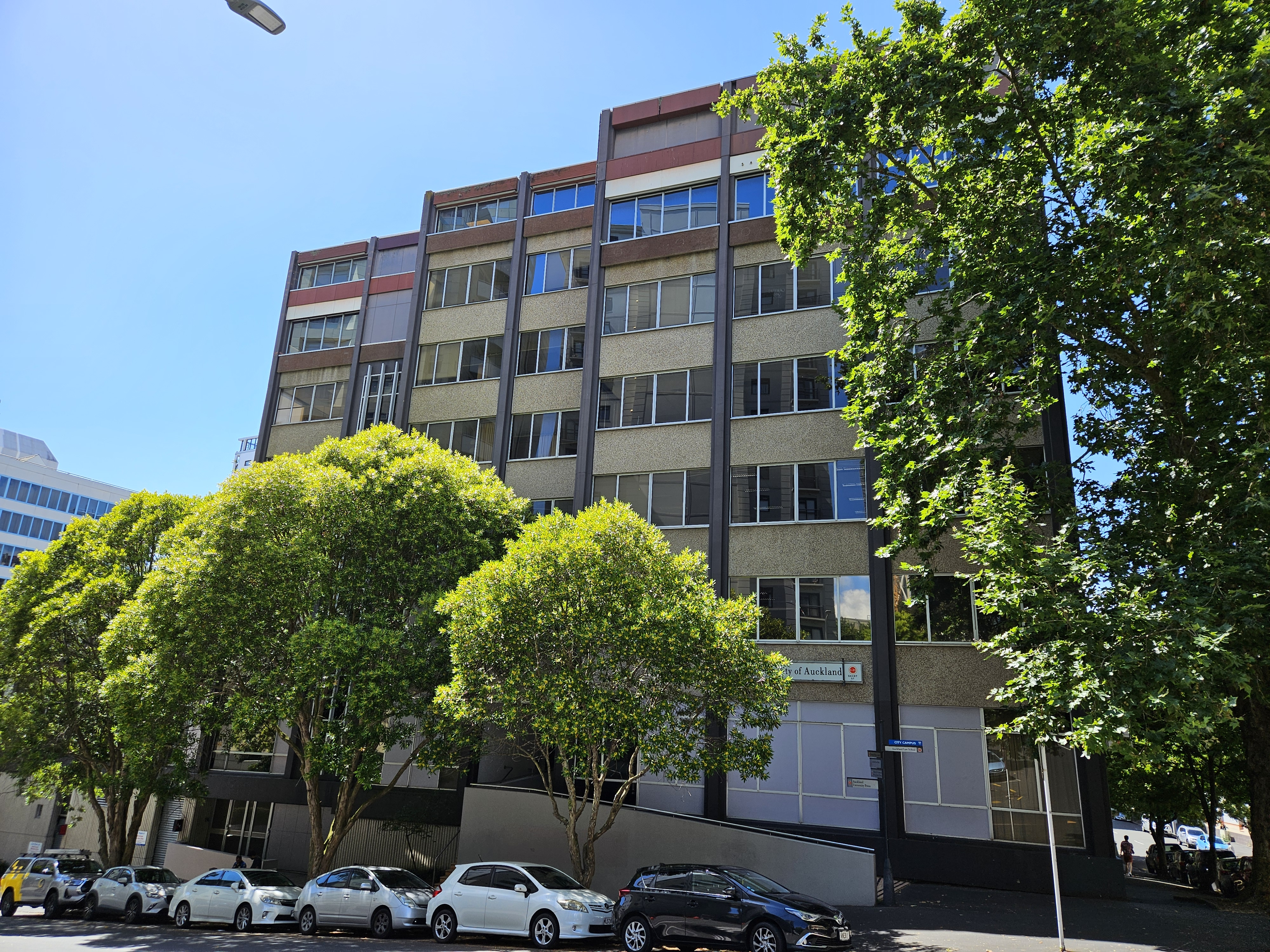
- Parent company: University of Auckland
- Founded: 1966
- Country of origin: New Zealand
- Headquarters location: Auckland
- Distribution: Potton & Burton (New Zealand); Eurospan Group (UK); Independent Publishers Group (US)
- Publication types: Books
- Official website: press.auckland.ac.nz

Auckland University Press is a New Zealand publisher that produces creative and scholarly work for a general audience. Founded in 1966 and formally recognised as Auckland University Press in 1972, it is a publisher based within the University of Auckland, located in Auckland, New Zealand. The Press currently publishes around 20 new books a year in history and politics, art and architecture, literature and poetry, Māori, Pacific and Asian Studies, science, business and health. It published its 500th book in 2005 of which 22 were prize winning publications.

== Awards ==
Auckland University Press won the Most Beautiful Books Australia & New Zealand Award (2013) and its authors have won a number of national prizes.

== Imprints ==
1966–1970: Published for the University of Auckland by the Oxford University Press

1970–1986: Auckland University Press/Oxford University Press

1986–: Auckland University Press

1995–1998: a small number of books carried the imprint Auckland University Press/Bridget Williams Books

== See also ==
- Holloway Press
