= Pete Bethune =

New Zealand ship's captain and published author

Captain Pete Bethune
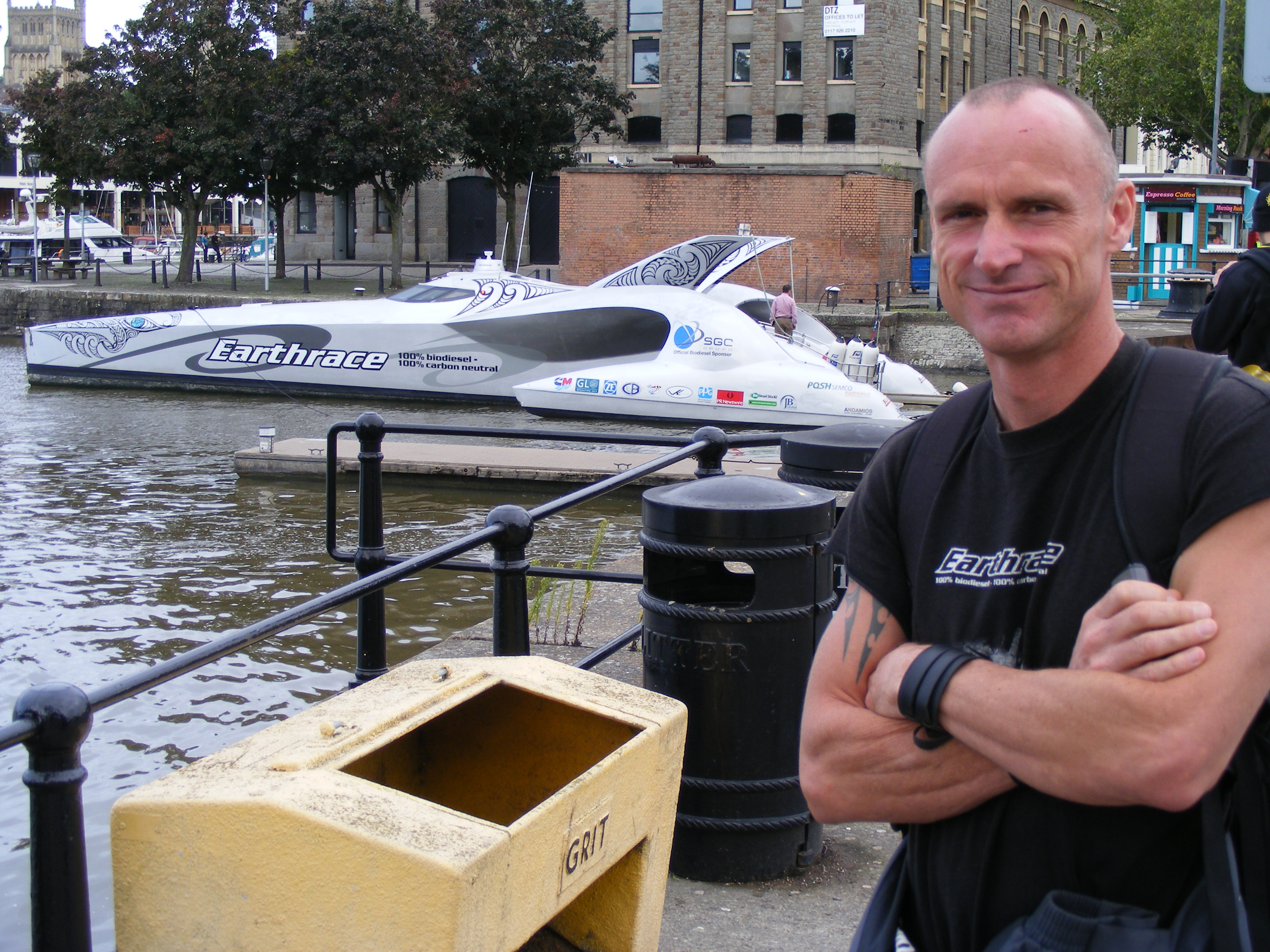
- Peter Bethune with Earthrace
- Born: Peter James Bethune; 4 April 1965 (age 61); Hamilton, New Zealand
- Education: Bachelor of Engineering, Bachelor of Science, Master of Business Administration
- Alma mater: University of Auckland, University of Waikato, Macquarie Graduate School of Management
- Occupations: Captain; CEO; producer; author
- Employer: Earthrace Charitable Trust
- Title: Captain
- Spouse(s): Sharyn Bethune (married in 1993), divorced
- Children: 2 daughters
- Parent(s): Don Bethune (father), Betty Bethune (mother)
- Website: Earthrace

Captain Peter James Bethune (born 4 April 1965) is a New Zealand ship's captain with 500 ton master licence, published author, producer of The Operatives TV show, and public speaker. He is the founder of Earthrace Conservation. He works assisting countries in Asia, Central America and Africa with fisheries enforcement and anti-poaching. He is the holder of the world record for circumnavigating the globe in his powerboat Earthrace, a wavepiercing trimaran powered with biofuels.

Earthrace was renamed the Ady Gil in 2009 and Bethune sailed it in Antarctica for Sea Shepherd Conservation Society^{[1]} to disrupt Japanese whaling activities. The vessel was subsequently rammed by the Shonan Maru 2, a Japanese whaling vessel. Bethune subsequently boarded the Shonan Maru 2, presented the captain with an invoice for the Ady Gil and attempted to arrest him. Bethune was detained, taken back to Japan and charged with a number of offences related to his trespassing and assault. He received a suspended sentence.

In 2012, Bethune started Earthrace Conservation, which works on conservation and environmental campaigns. His team consists of former military personnel, and they are involved in fisheries enforcement, anti-poaching, and stopping wildlife smuggling. Many of the missions have been filmed and made into the TV series The Operatives, which has now aired in around 90 countries. More recently Bethune's work has involved training government teams on coastal and offshore surveillance, fisheries enforcement, and maritime security.

On 22 November 2017, Bethune was attacked by two men in the Brazilian city of Santander. Bethune at the time had been researching the illegal pet trade of Amazonian wildlife. He said a man with a knife initially lunged at him, and there ensued a scuffle, with Bethune struggling to hold onto the man's knife arm. A second man approached from the rear and put his arm around Bethune's neck, forcing him to fall to the ground. Bethune was stabbed in the chest. He continued to struggle, and the assailants eventually ran off. Bethune returned to New Zealand, and a few days later gave a TEDx talk where he recounted the horrifying ordeal.

In 2019 Bethune's non-profit Earthrace Conservation purchased the former US Navy and USCG ship Modoc, which his team converted into a conservation support vessel. The vessel has a Zodiac Milpro FC470, a Willard 7.4m RIB, a 7m barge, and a Schiebel S100 Camcopter UAV. The ship was taken to Costa Rica in 2020 where she supports the Government Environmental Agency SINAC in various campaigns protecting Costa Rica's national parks.

In January 2021, while on patrol in Piedras Blancas National Park in Costa Rica, Bethune was bitten by a deadly Fer-de-lance snake. He was taken to Golfito Hospital and admitted to the Intensive Care Unit. He was released from hospital 2 weeks later, but with some ongoing health issues related to the snake bite and subsequent treatment.

In March 2022 while at anchor in the port town of Buenaventura in Colombia, his team was attacked by an estimated 15 pirates that attempted to board their ship. His team fired a series of warning shots into the water from an assault rifle, and the pirates abandoned their assault and left.

== Personal life and early career ==
Bethune grew up in Hamilton West, New Zealand as one of five children. He completed a Master of Business Administration at the Macquarie Graduate School of Management, Bachelor of Science at the University of Waikato, and a Bachelor of Engineering at the University of Auckland. He has two daughters with his wife, Sharyn, his high school sweetheart, who divorced him in 2009.

He began his career as an oil exploration engineer for Schlumberger Wireline Services and worked in the North Sea and Libya. In 1997, he co-founded CamSensor Technologies. The company manufactures automated camera systems for controlling robots used in complex tasks such as cutting up and grading meat carcasses. He later moved to Sydney to establish a subsidiary there.

His entry into conservation started when he wrote a 20,000-word paper titled "Alternative Fuels for Road Transport" while pursuing his Master of Business Administration degree from Macquarie University in 2004 He concluded that hydrogen as a fuel was a dead-end, but that biofuels such as biodiesel and ethanol could become mainstream in use. He also predicted the battery electric vehicle could eventually replace the combustion engine in terms of road transport. For leisure, Bethune enjoys camping, scuba, freediving, kayaking, and CrossFit. He told a reporter for The New Zealand Herald: "I've come from a very unusual background to be a conservationist."

== Captain of Earthrace ==
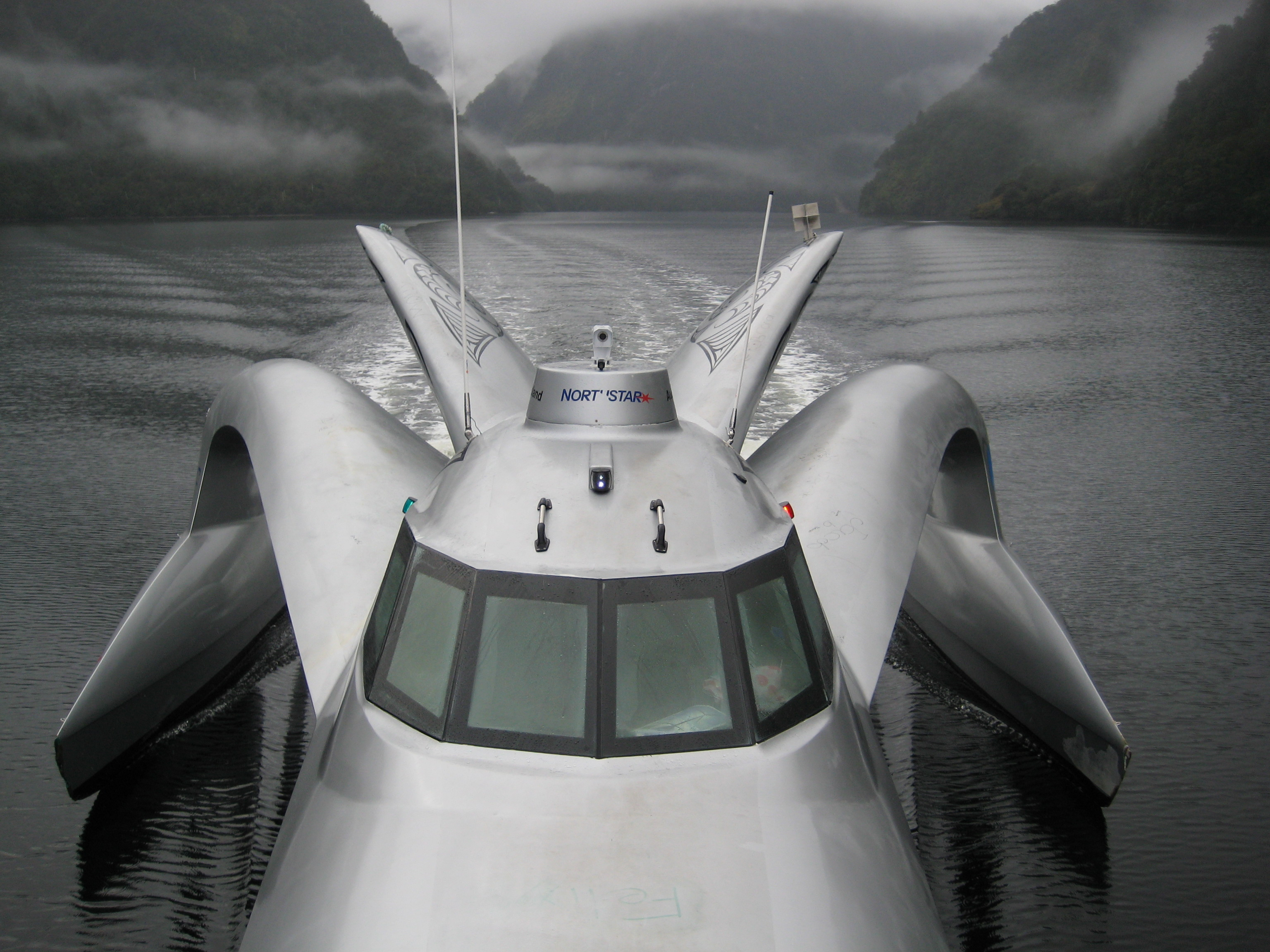
MY Earthrace in Dusky Sound, Fiordland, New Zealand

Based on his research at Macquarie Graduate School of Management, Bethune set out to prove that hydrocarbon fuels could be replaced by sustainable bio-fuels. He had Earthrace designed by LOMOcean Design and built in order to break the world record for a circumnavigation of the globe by a powerboat in hopes that it would call attention to the viability of biodiesel as an alternative fuel. He mortgaged his New Zealand home and financed the building in the hopes of recouping the expenses from sponsorship. He declined a $4 million sponsorship from a company that would have required them to use regular diesel.

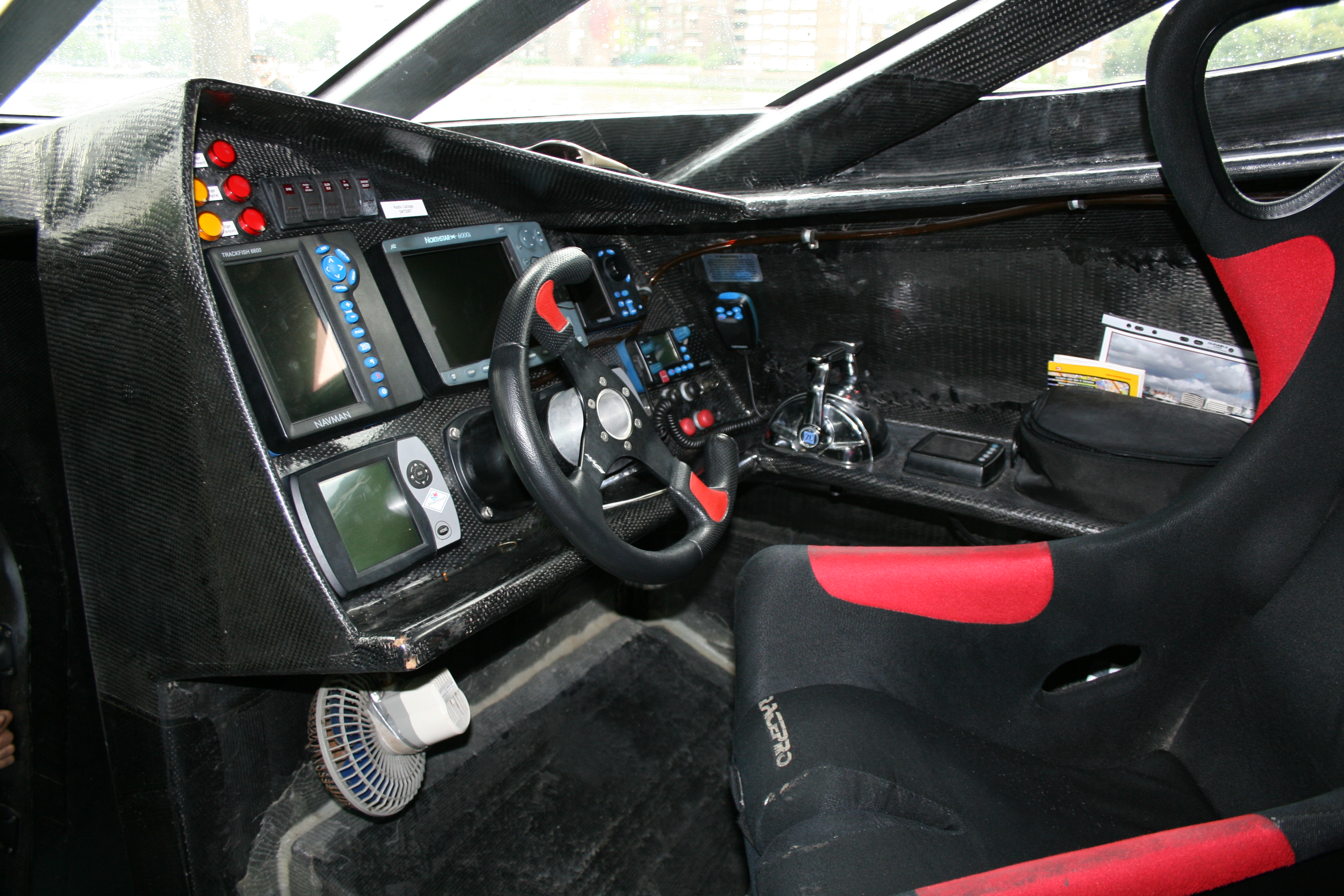
The helm of Earthrace resembled more a race car than a boat

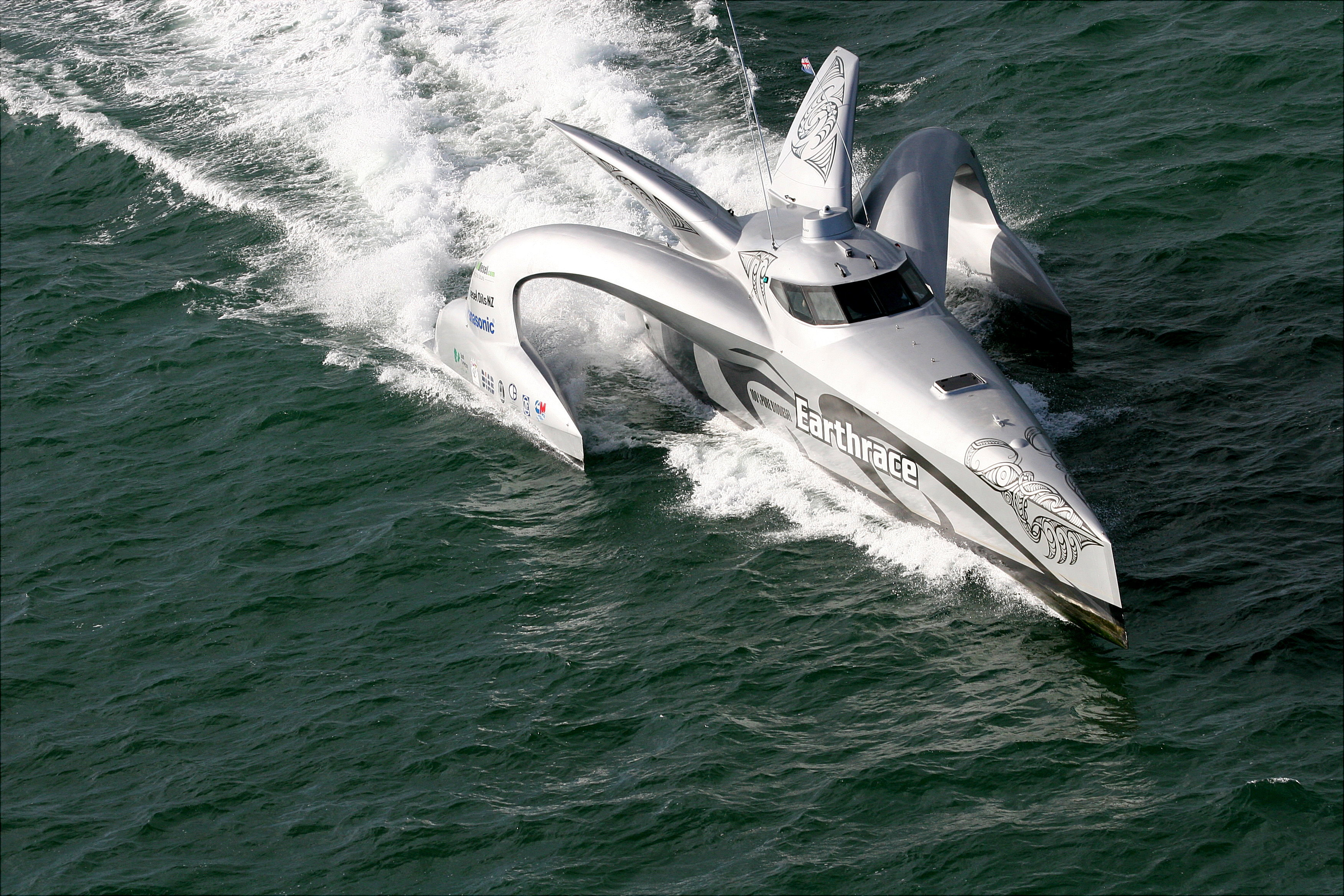
MY Earthrace offshore from Mexico in her record setting voyage in 2008

His first attempt began in Barbados on 10 March 2007. He encountered significant delays due to issues with the propellers and other mechanical problems. On the night of 19 March, while around 22 kilometres (14 mi) offshore from Guatemala, Earthrace collided with a local fishing boat. The crew was absolved of any responsibility after a 10-day investigation during which they were held in custody under armed guard in the military compound in Puerto Quetzal. The delays prevented them from completing the circumnavigation in record time using their original start location. The crew took Earthrace to San Diego where they made repairs. They then restarted their record attempt, leaving San Diego on 7 April 2007. Once they rounded Aceh in Indonesia and started crossing the Indian Ocean the vessel encountered significant bad weather in the first monsoon of the season. The monsoon remained with them all the way to Salalah in Oman. The vessel passed through the Suez Canal, then when getting close to Spain, crew discovered a structural failure around the depth transducer. Bethune said the "failure was a result of the constant pounding in crossing the Indian Ocean". The crew made temporary repairs and headed out to cross the Atlantic, however the repairs failed and Earthrace limped back to port in Málaga, Spain. Bethune decided to abandon the attempt.

Bethune returned to New Zealand to recover from what he said was "a brutal ordeal". After meeting with some of his original sponsors, he assembled a new team. The vessel was repaired and departed from Sagunto, Spain, in another record attempt on 1 March 2008. The second record attempt also suffered a large number of setbacks. The auto-pilot system failed in the Atlantic crossing. This was repaired in Puerto Rico. There was a general strike in Panama Canal causing 3 days in delays waiting to transit the canal.

In the leg between Hawaii and Marshall Islands, there was a problem with the common rail injection system, which was repaired in Majuro. The crew then had their biggest setback in Palau, when Earthrace hit a submerged log a few nautical miles offshore. The vessel limped back into Palau with extensive damage. A list of problems included a bent driveshaft, propeller damage, smashed P-Bracket, smashed engine mounts, broken gearbox, rudder damage, and a 5-metre gouge down the starboard side of the composite hull. Crew determined it would be almost impossible to repair the vessel quickly in Palau. They made temporary repairs and ran on one engine to Singapore. On arrival, the initial assessment was repairs would take at least 2 weeks, which would make the record almost impossible to get.

The marine salvage company Posh Semco offered to help with haul-out, and the vessel was pulled from the water. The crew worked around the clock for 3 days. Earthrace was put back into the water with what Bethune described as "the ugliest composite repair" he'd ever seen. The crew continued on their voyage towards their finish line in Spain. Bethune finished at the Spanish port of Sagunto on 27 June. The journey was completed in 60 days, 23 hours and 49 minutes, beating the former record by over two weeks. Bethune later confessed the reason they missed the record on the first attempt was his leadership was poor. He said the real difference in the second successful attempt was he did a better job in making decisions and running the team. He also claimed his team had been outstanding in Singapore. They had achieved a small miracle in getting Earthrace repaired so quickly, in very challenging circumstances.

== Earthrace Promotional Tour ==
When Earthrace was first launched in 2006, Bethune took her on a promotional tour around New Zealand. The vessel was given a Maori blessing in Raglan before she left to cross the Pacific. Over the next three years, the team took the boat to 186 cities around the world, opening the boat to school groups, public, media, and sponsors. Through this time, over 250,000 people walked aboard the vessel. Bethune used the tour to promote awareness of alternative fuels such as biodiesel.

As a publicity stunt, Bethune underwent liposuction surgery in order to convert body fat into fuel. A cosmetic surgeon removed around 50ml of fat from his back. The surgeon provided a further 10 litres of human fat from 2 other patients. Bethune converted this into 7 litres of biodiesel in his kitchen at home. Bethune ran the fuel in his vessel, claiming the 7 litres of fuel ran the boat for an estimated 8 nautical miles.

== Captain of Ady Gil ==
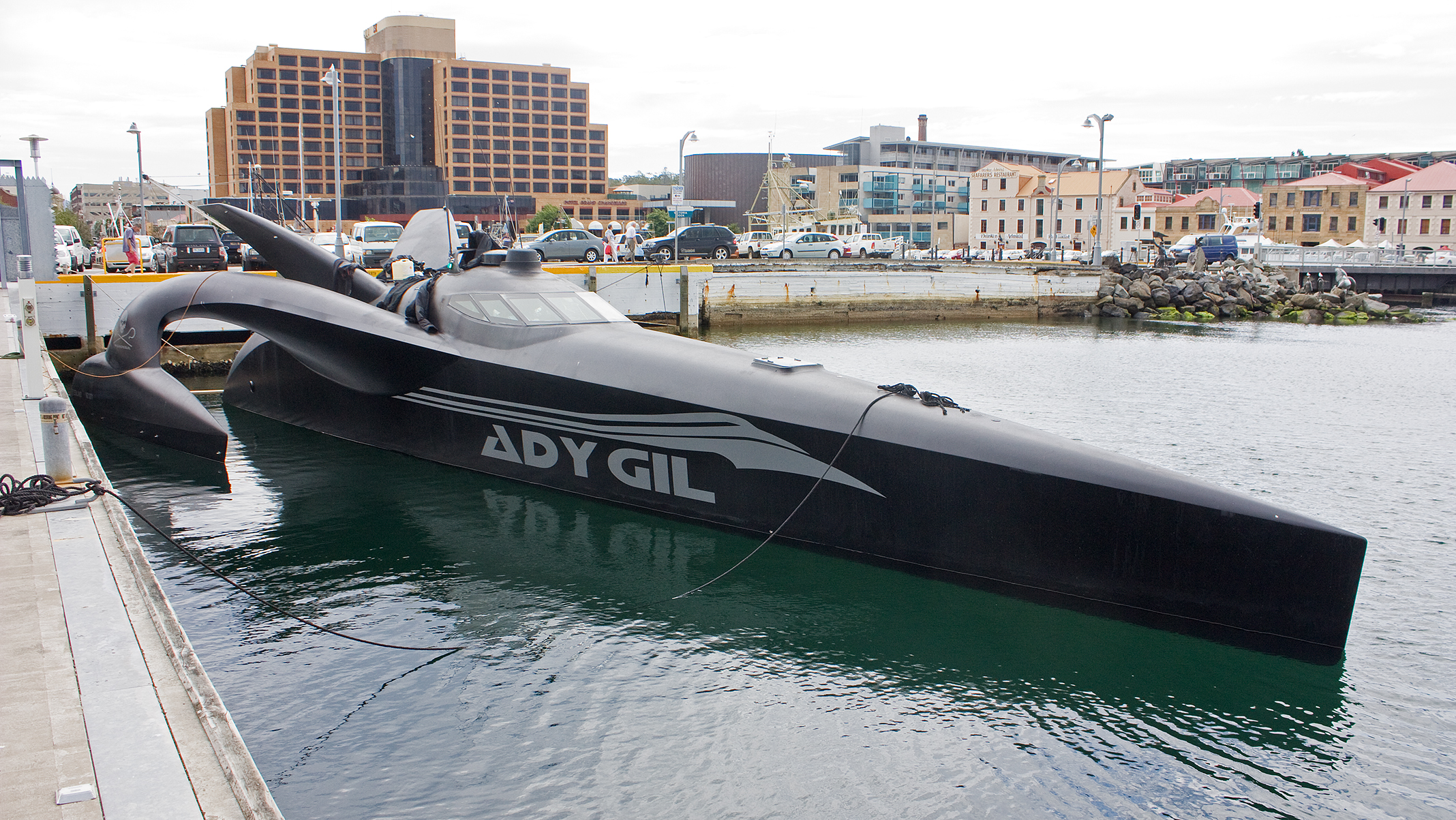
Ady Gil, Hobart, Australia, 16 December 2009.

After touring ports around the globe, the Earthrace was put on sale for $3 million and Bethune considered using it to interfere with Japanese whaling in the Southern Ocean if a buyer could not be found. Hollywood production-house owner Ady Gil purchased the boat and Earthrace was renamed after him on 17 October 2009. Gil leased the ship to Sea Shepherd Conservation Society for $1 / year to pursue Japanese whalers in Antarctica. Bethune was put in charge of the refit and was to captain the vessel in its anti-whaling activities. Bethune said before the operation: "I'm a conservationist. One of the things I've learned on Earthrace is stand up for stuff you believe in. Year after year the Japanese go down there and nothing seems to change ... If they want to go amping things up a bit, then bring it on." His wife later told the press that he first became alarmed by the state of the oceans when skippering the vessel during the record attempts.

On 6 January 2010 the Ady Gil was involved in a collision with the Japanese whaling vessel MV Shōnan Maru 2 in the Southern Ocean when the Shonan Maru No 2 hit it, and the Ady Gil was subsequently abandoned. An investigation into the collision by the Australian Maritime Safety Authority (AMSA) was inconclusive in assigning blame for the collision. AMSA was unable to verify claims made by Sea Shepherd, while the Japanese government declined to participate with the investigation saying any information it had might be needed for an inquiry by its own authorities. However, Maritime New Zealand investigators released a report that the Ady Gil was the stand on vessel and had right of way. The Shonan Maru No 2 was the port side vessel, and the overtaking vessel, and under both circumstances, had an obligation to keep well clear of the Ady Gil. The report did conclude however that the captains of both the Ady Gil and the whaler, the Shonan Maru No 2, "were partly responsible for either contributing to, or failing to respond to the 'close quarters' situation that led to the collision".

== Arrest, trial, and conviction ==
On 15 February 2010 in the middle of the night, Bethune attempted to board the Shōnan Maru 2 from a jet ski. On his first attempt he fell into the water, and was recovered by his engineer, Larry Routledge a few minutes later. On his second attempt, Bethune managed to climb between the anti-boarding spikes and onto the side of the hull, where he then cut through the protective netting and clambered aboard. The purpose of the boarding was to conduct a citizen's arrest on her captain, Hiroyuki Komiya, alleging attempted murder, and to present a claim for $3 million for the ramming of his vessel. Bethune was not successful in arresting Komiya, nor did he receive any compensation. Bethune was successful however in getting taken to Japan to face charges, which he hoped would increase public awareness of Japanese whaling. Japan's Institute of Cetacean Research issued a statement calling it a publicity stunt. He was detained by the ship's crew and taken to Tokyo, where he was arrested by the Japanese Coast Guard on 12 March on charges of trespassing.

On 2 April 2010, Bethune was indicted in Japan on five charges: boarding a vessel without due cause, illegal possession of a knife, destruction of property, assault and obstruction of business. The assault charge was based on the allegation that he threw a bottle of butyric acid onto the Shōnan Maru 2 days before the boarding, causing chemical burns to a whaler's face. The Sea Shepherd group claimed the burns were self-inflicted when the crewman was shooting pepper spray at the protesters. Bethune could have faced up to 15 years in prison if found guilty of injury, or up to three years if found guilty of trespass. His lawyer claimed the charges were unfounded and stated that his client would strongly deny them. He was held without bond in the maximum security Tokyo Detention Center while he stood trial. Bethune's trial began on 27 May. Bethune was charged with intruding on the ship, forcibly obstructing business, violating the Firearms and Swords Control Law and damaging property.

Several major news media reported that Bethune pleaded guilty to four charges while others reported that he admitted four charges or that he conceded four of the charges but has contested an assault charge. News review.com claims that Bethune did not "plead" guilty as there is no such thing as a plea in Japanese criminal proceedings and he and his Japanese lawyers claim that Sea Shepherd's actions are protected by the United Nations World Charter for Nature, which allows private organisations to interfere in government-like ways in the interest of the environment. Though he admitted to launching a projectile of butyric acid, he contested the assault charge against him on the grounds that the Japanese crew injured themselves in firing of their own pepper spray guns into the wind. In his tearful final statement delivered on 10 June, Bethune said: "I did not have the intention of hurting crew members, nor do I believe I injured them. I took action because I wanted to stop Japan's illegal whaling." Prosecutors demanded a sentence of two years in prison.

The Labour Party's Chris Carter accused the New Zealand Government of "washing their hands of the fate" of Bethune. Bethune received visitations from consular staff. Prime Minister John Key said "...it's worth noting that I can't get involved in a prosecution in another country any more than I can get involved in a prosecution in New Zealand. What I can do is make sure the person is being treated fairly."

On 4 June, in what was later claimed by Paul Watson to be a legal strategy on the part of Sea Shepherd, Sea Shepherd announced that it was no longer going to be formally associated with Bethune since a set of bow and arrows was on the Ady Gil during the anti-whaling operation. The group stressed that the weapon was not intended to be used against any person, and Bethune previously had stated to Animal Planet cameras during Whale Wars filming that he intended to use the bow and arrows to spoil whale meat for commercial use. Captain Bethune later said he felt betrayed by Sea Shepherd abandoning him. He claimed Watson had agreed to the bow and arrow being taken aboard. Sea Shepherd said it would continue to support Bethune during the trial in Japan.

On 7 July, Bethune was convicted of disruption of business, destruction of property, boarding a vessel without due cause, assault and possession of a knife without due cause and given a two-year suspended sentence. Bethune was deported to New Zealand on 9 July. Bethune held a press conference upon returning to New Zealand. He told reporters: "My trial in Japan represents a miscarriage in justice. Not because I stood before that court, but because the captain of the Shōnan Maru 2 did not." He also called the New Zealand Government a "lap dog" for what he considered a lack of backbone in standing up to Japan over whaling.

== Disassociation from Sea Shepherd ==
Bethune disassociated himself from Sea Shepherd by posting an open letter on his Facebook page on 4 October 2010, condemning the organisation and its leader Paul Watson as "dishonest" and "morally bankrupt". According to his letter, he was directed by Paul Watson to sink the Ady Gil deliberately for PR purposes after the collision with the Japanese whaling ship. He insists that the senior members of Sea Shepherd regularly lie and conspire over serious matters, detailing many cases in his letter.

Based largely on testimony from Bethune and former Captain of the Sea Shepherd boat Bob Barker, Chuck Swift, Ady Gil successfully sued Sea Shepherd for the deliberate abandonment of his vessel in Antarctica. In siding with Mr. Gil, the arbitrator awarded him compensatory damages of $500,000 plus interest from 8 January 2010 forward.

In characterising testimony for the suit, the arbitrator was particularly harsh on Paul Watson; finding the Sea Shepherd founder in some instances to "be highly evasive, internally contradictory, or at odds with his own prior written statements, and in certain areas simply lacking the basic indicia of genuineness that instinctively inspires confidence and trust." As for Gil, the arbitrator stated his "testimony appeared genuine in intent if somewhat fuzzy in detail, and perhaps colored in hindsight by strong emotions of betrayal on the part of those in whom he had placed a perhaps naïve degree of trust."

== Earthrace Conservation ==
Bethune founded his own conservation organisation in 2011, Earthrace Conservation. and he assists government agencies with illegal fishing, wildlife poaching and other environmental crimes. It has non-profit or charity status in New Zealand, US and UK. He also has a Television Show "The Operatives" that follows his team's work. Bethune employs former military personnel that undertake the missions.

In 2013, Bethune was running fisheries patrols in the Guanacaste region of Costa Rica. His team had been flying a Skylark military drone at night over the surrounding waters when they detected a vessel the Amelita, allegedly fishing inside a Marine protected areas. Bethune launched his patrol boat from shore and approached the Amelita. The team covertly filmed the Amelita engaged in shrimp trawling, following her for 7 hours. At daybreak, crew of the Amelita pulled in their trawl nets. Bethune boarded the vessel, filmed the catch, and interviewed the Captain, who claimed to be the President of the Commercial Fisherman's Association in Puntarenas. Bethune handed the evidence over to a local NGO and Costa Rican authorities who prosecuted the captain. Bethune travelled back to Costs Rica in 2015 to provide additional evidence in the court case.

In another fishery patrol mission in Costa Rica, Bethune and a crew of four took their 7.7m Sealegs vessel 300 nautical miles offshore to Cocos Island. The voyage was expected to take just 24 hours, but due to mechanical issues, fuel problems and bad weather, ended up at 72 hours. Bethune later claimed "5 broken men arrived on Cocos Island". Several days later on night patrols near the island, Bethune was able to film seven boats allegedly involved in shark finning activities inside the Cocos Island Marine protected area. Evidence of the illegal fishing was handed over to Authorities who prosecuted Captains of the 7 vessels.

In 2017, Bethune was in the Philippines training local fisheries enforcement teams consisting of personnel from Navy special forces, Ministry of Fisheries (BFAR) and local police (Bantay Dagat). While on patrols at night on 26 May, they came across a Danish Seine trawler the "Dan Israel R", allegedly fishing inside municipal waters. Danish Seine is a form of destructive bottom trawling banned in the Philippines. Crew of the Dan Israel R were arrested and the vessel escorted into the BFAR impound facility in Cavite. The vessel was one of 23 in a so-called Alphabet fleet. Owners of the vessel subsequently made a cash offer of 2 million pesos to settle the case.

In 2019 Earthrace Conservation purchased and acquired the former US Navy and US Coast guard vessel Modoc.

== The Operatives TV series ==
In 2011 Bethune formed a team of military veterans and specialist civilians to catch and prosecute environmental criminals. This led to the development of The Operatives TV series, which so far has run for two seasons and aired in over 90 countries. Units represented in the team included former US Navy SEAL Team 6 and 2, US Marine Recon, US Army Ranger, French 1er regiment (SAS) and New Zealand Paratrooper. Each episode involves Bethune and his team examining some form of environmental criminal activity working alongside existing law enforcement units. 18 episodes have been filmed dealing with issues such as shark finning, illegal logging, marine protected area, IUU Fishing, wildlife smuggling, blast fishing, cyanide fishing, seal hunting and wildlife poaching.

In July 2012, Bethune and Jack Waldron, a former New Zealand paratrooper, entered a De Beers diamond mine near Luderitz in Namibia. They were dropped a mile offshore at night by a zodiac, and swam ashore into the mine area. Over the next four days, Bethune and Waldon avoided security patrols while trying to film the government-sanctioned seal clubbing. On the final day, Bethune was hiding in a gillie suit about 50 meters from where a group of seal clubbers have assembled. He filmed the clubbing of around 500 baby seals. The two men by now were out of food and water, and bad weather prevented them from being picked up by zodiac. They ended up hiking out of the diamond mine at night. The video has since been used by various animal rights and conservation groups including PETA. It was also used in the first episode of The Operatives TV show. In 2015, Bethune presented a 200,000 strong petition to Jake Jacobs, Secretary of the Namibian National Assembly, asking the government to abandon the seal clubbing industry.

In 2013, Bethune assembled his team in Costa Rica and they ran several missions targeting illegal gold mining in the Corcovado National Park, training and working alongside the government MINAE forces. Rangers claimed the gold miners were destructive by killing and eating endangered wildlife, causing extensive erosion along creek and river beds, and using cyanide poison to separate gold from the silt. Jack Waldron gathered aerial intelligence by flying a paramotor over the jungle, locating multiple areas of interest. The full team was inserted into the jungle by rappelling from a Bell UH1H helicopter. The campaign led to a number of successful prosecutions and 2 illegal gold mining operations were closed down. There were two cases of gunshots being fired at the Rangers by fleeing gold miners.

== Stabbing in Brazil ==
On 22 November 2017, Bethune was attacked by two men wielding knives in the Brazilian town of Santander. In a fight lasting several minutes, Bethune was stabbed in the chest, and the assailants eventually ran off. Bethune went back to his hotel in Macapá where he covered the chest wound with bandages. He then travelled to Macapá Hospital where he was treated in the emergency ward. His wound was stitched up by Doctor Aldiene Pena, and he was released the same day. Bethune had been in the area following the illegal pet trade. His team had started its investigation some three months earlier in the Peruvian town of Iquitos in the upper reaches of the Amazon basin. Bethune says they stumbled into a wildlife smuggling operation, and over the subsequent months, followed the trail all the way to Macapá in Brazil. According to Bethune, if you are smuggling wildlife out of the Amazon, this is the city you take it through. He believes that as airports have improved security, boats have become increasingly used in the transport of illicit goods, including protected wildlife, out of the Amazon.

There were a number of similarities between the stabbing of Bethune in Santander, and the murder of Sir Peter Blake, a few kilometers away in Macapá. Both were Kiwi conservationists working on illegal activities in the Amazon, and both were attacked by armed men. This is explored in the 2021 documentary Garden of Evil, which traces the background to both attacks. In the case of Blake, the mystery remains: was it a robbery gone wrong, or was it a premeditated murder? Similarly in the attack on Captain Bethune, police concluded it may have been a premeditated hit, but the evidence was inconclusive. In 2019, Bethune travelled back to Macapa with the Garden of Evil film crew where he retraced his steps. He also visited Doctor Pena, who had treated him in Macapá Hospital.

== MY Modoc ==
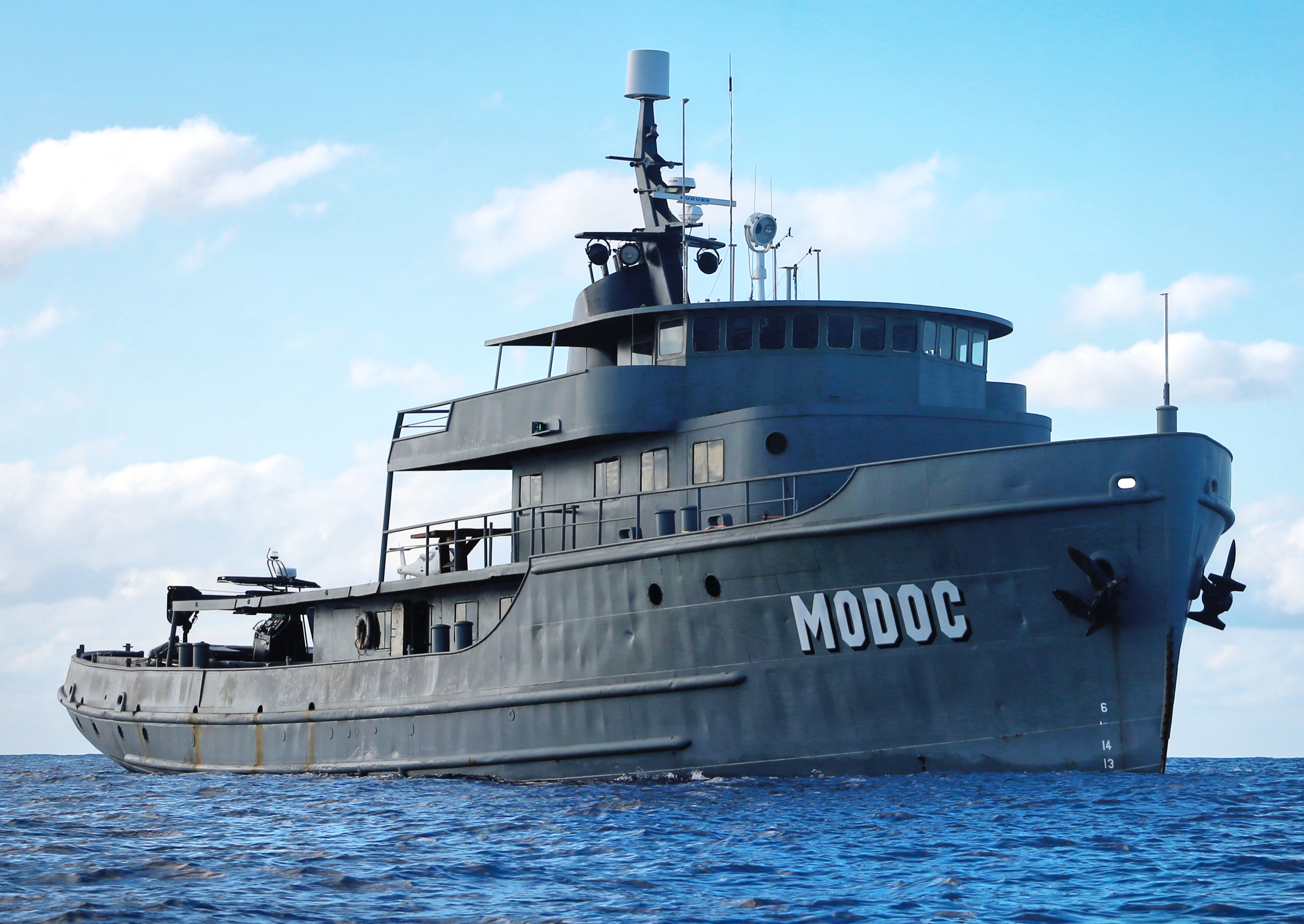
Modoc at Socorro Island

MY Modoc was originally launched in 1944 as an ocean going auxiliary tug with the designation USS Bagaduce (ATA-194). In 1959 she was transferred to the USCG, and renamed USCGC Modoc (WMEC-194). She was subsequently decommissioned in 1979. In 2019, Bethune's NGO Earthrace Conservation purchased the Modoc and converted her to a conservation ship, complete with a 4.7m Zodiac, 7.4m Willard RIB, 7m Barge, and a Schiebel S100 Camcopter UAV. In 2019 Bethune and his team refitted the ship in Ensenada (Mexico) to accommodate the new assets. One of the major changes involved converting the upper deck into a flight deck to accommodate the Schiebel S-100 UAV. In 2020 the ship arrived in Costa Rica where she now serves as Bethune and his team's "Base of Operations". The ship and crew provide support services to SINAC, the government environmental agency responsible for protecting national parks. The team patrols with SINAC Rangers in both marine and terrestrial national parks along the Pacific Coast.

== Snake bite in Costa Rica ==
On 26 December 2020, Bethune was bitten by a deadly Fer-de-Lance snake while on patrol in Piedras Blancas National Park in Costa Rica. The Fer-de-Lance snake belongs to the pit viper family, and is the deadliest snake in all of the Americas. Bethune had seen a number of these snakes previously while on jungle patrols in Costa Rica, and was well aware of the risks they posed. Bethune claimed that when the bite happened, he thought he was a dead man. The bite was in the back of his calf, and intense pain was immediate, he said. The crew with Bethune at the time attempted to carry him down through the rugged jungle, but after several falls, Bethune ended up crawling with his legs forward, and climbing down rock ledges and escarpments. After 60 minutes Bethune began getting tired, and would stop crawling, close his eyes and rest, while his crew encouraged him to keep moving. Once at the base of the jungle, Bethune, now nearly unconscious, was carried by his crew to an awaiting Coastguard vessel.

Bethune has no recollection of the coastguard voyage to Golfito. He arrived at Golfito Hospital some three hours after the initial bite, and was immediately admitted to the Intensive Care Unit, where he was treated with a combination of anti-venom, antibiotics and morphine. Bethune's leg became enormously swollen from the venom, and doctors worried he would lose the leg. Some 15 ampules of anti-venom were administered over a three-day period. After one week, swelling in the leg started to subside. Bethune was released from hospital on 9 January 2021, having spent two weeks in hospital. There were several medical complications related to the snakebite. One of these was a distended bladder, which required a catheter. A month after the bite, Bethune began light training again. He remains with a dead patch in his calf where he has no feeling.

== Piracy attack in Colombia ==
In the early hours of 8 March 2022, Bethune's conservation ship MY Modoc was attacked by an estimated 15 pirates. The ship was anchored in the port town of Buenaventura on the Pacific coast of Colombia, when it was approached by six small skiffs. Brad Rooke, who was on security detail at the time, said "such a flotilla was not unusual, but as they drifted in front of our ship, they cut their engines and began to drift down our port side."

Rooke said that the pirates had prepared metal hooks to attach to the side of the ship, and as they drifted past, they suddenly latched them over the railing and began scaling up the side. Appa, the ship's Belgian Malinois security dog, by now was going berserk at them, Rooke revealed. He says he fired a series of warning shots from an assault rifle into the water, and the pirates he could see clambered back down into their boats. Then. a further two pirates were spotted clambering over the stern, and he fired more warning shots. They then climbed back down, with the security dog continuing to bark at them.

Bethune, who was initially asleep at the time of the attack, said that the pirate boats drifted astern, before eventually starting their engines again and motoring off towards the main port. When asked what was the attack for, he said "it was probably not related to our conservation work, but rather kidnapping and robbery. The pirates were well prepared and coordinated," he said.

Buenaventura has had a notorious history plagued by the Colombian armed conflict, drug trafficking, violence, and the presence of guerrilla and paramilitary groups. Due to the violence of Buenaventura, The New York Times wrote an article with the title being "Cocaine Wars Make Port Colombia’s Deadliest City".

== Public speaking ==
Bethune has spoken at various events and conferences on topics such as conservation, leadership, motivation and maritime security. These have included:

1. Keynote address. US National Biodiesel Board Conference, San Antonio, TX, USA, 2009.
2. President Lecture Series. Maritime Security. CAL Maritime Academy. Oakland, CA, USA. 2016.
3. Keynote address. Jeronimo Martens Seafood Sustainability Conference. Lisbon, Portugal, 2016.
4. Keynote address.Campus Party. São Paulo, Brazil. 2017.
5. Lightning in a Bottle. Saving the World's Endangered Wildlife, Bradley, CA, USA, 2017.
6. Guest speaker. IDEX Dive Expo, Illegal Fishing and its global impact. Singapore, 2017.
7. Guest Speaker, TEDx Auckland. "A Cause worth Dying For". Auckland, New Zealand, 2017
