= MGSM =

MGSM may stand for:

- Macquarie Graduate School of Management, now part of Macquarie Business School, Australia
- Military General Service Medal, a British campaign medal approved in 1847
