= Palm cooling =

Recovery intervention for physical activity

Palm cooling (often referred to as palmar cooling) is a type of recovery intervention that involves cooling the palm of the hand during rest periods between bouts of strenuous physical activity. The palm cooling modality can be used to moderate increases in core temperature resulting from the level of physical activity, the wearing of protective clothing or a combination of both, for example in the activities of military personnel or firefighters.

Sporting activities, for example during timeouts of basketball or at half time in a game of football, where recovery time is limited, is another example where the level of physical activity combined with or without high ambient temperature can lead to raised core temperature. In these circumstances palm cooling can be used as it is important that the cooling intervention does not chill major muscle groups, which need to be kept warm to optimize performance when the physical activity is resumed.

There is some evidence of palm cooling during rest periods delaying the onset of fatigue, which is a major precursor of injury and an inhibitor of performance. Palm cooling is also used for strength & conditioning, for example between sets in a weight training programme or where obese subjects are taking part in a weight loss exercise programme.

== Background ==
=== Thermoregulation ===
Human physiology involves a complex thermoregulation system for moderating core temperature.

In areas of glabrous, that is non-hairy, skin there are special blood vessels called arteriovenous anastomoses, or AVAs, which act as the body's radiators by allowing blood to reach the venous plexus close to the skin surface without going through capillaries and hence facilitate heat transfer.

These AVA's are common in mammals, for example in dogs the AVAs are concentrated in their tongues and in bears the nose is a key radiator of heat. In humans and apes the AVAs are concentrated in the palms of the hands, the soles of the feet and the upper face.

It is more practical to apply a cooling medium to the palms of the hands, rather than to the soles of the feet or the face, so cooling the palms became the focus for researchers.

=== TRPs ===
The human skin contains Transient Receptor Potential Channels (TRPs), which are activated by heat, cold, vibration, pressure and some chemicals such as menthol & camphor as well as some spices such as allicin (found in garlic) and capsaicin (found in chili peppers) etc. These TRPs are connected to the spinal canal and some research has shown that they can play an important role in moderating pain and creating a feel good factor by stimulating the release of dopamine and serotonin in the brain.

Some researchers have postulated that palm cooling has a neural impact alongside the mediation of blood temperature. TRPs could play a role in producing this neural impact.

== History ==
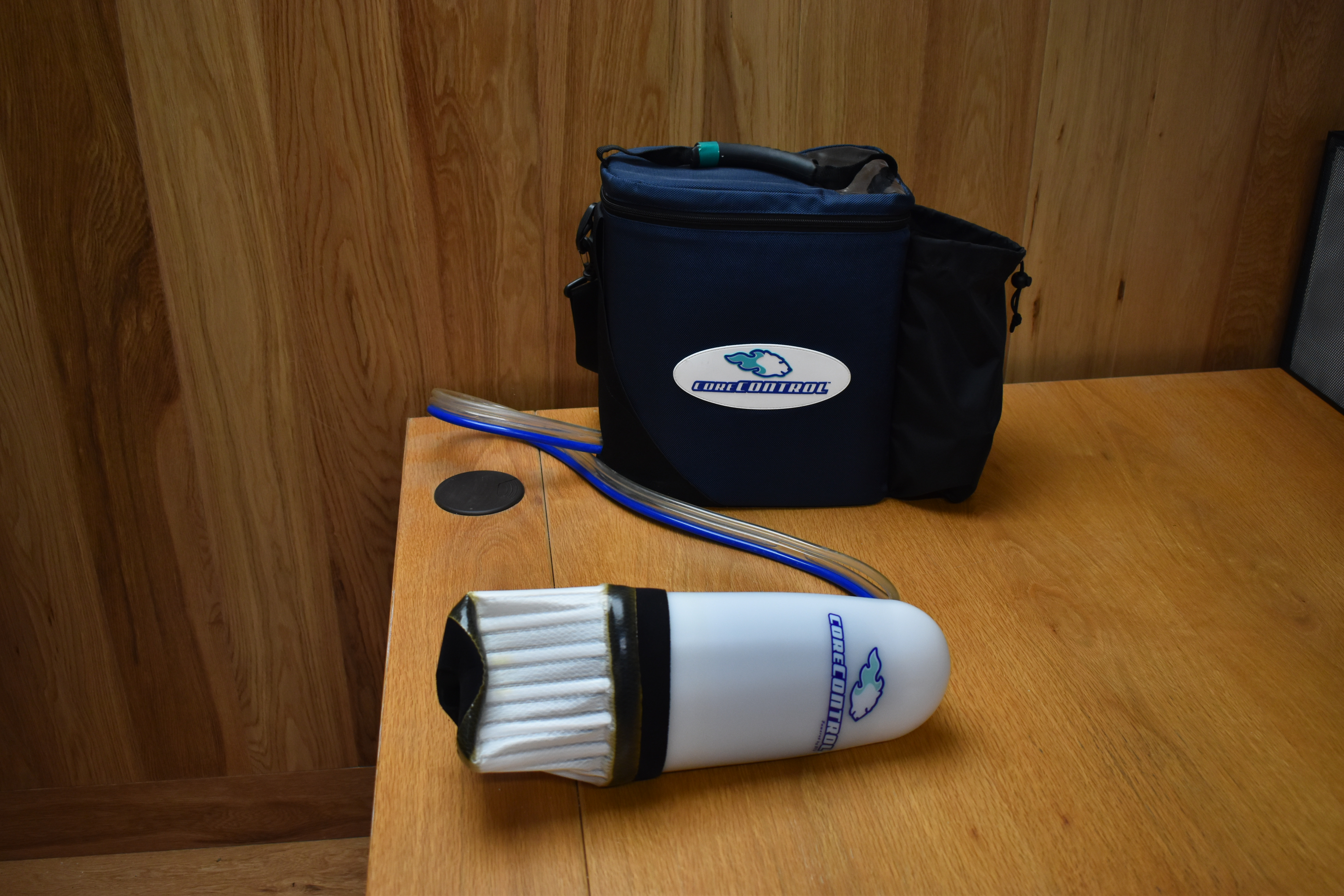
Stanford Core Control Glove

The palm cooling concept was developed at Stanford University having evolved from research in the 1990s into palm warming for hypothermic individuals. Core temperature mediation via palm cooling was revisited in the early 2000s, following a commission by the US Military research facility DARPA (Defense Advanced Research Projects Agency) to conduct research into moderating heat stress.

The lead researchers at Stanford were the human thermoregulation specialists, Professor Craig Heller and Dr Dennis Grahn, who as part of the research project developed the Stanford Glove device, which facilitated palm cooling, or palm heating, while simultaneously applying a mild vacuum, that is a slight negative pressure.

The principle behind the use of slight negative pressure was to encourage additional blood flow to the skin in the palm, which was simultaneously cooled through conduction by a cooling medium flowing through a pad that the palm was placed on within the glove.

Research into the efficacy of palm cooling has been conducted at Stanford University, University of New Mexico, Humboldt State University, Ohio State University and the University of Tulsa; and in Australia at the University of Western Sydney and Charles Sturt University. Studies have been conducted into the use of palm cooling for strength & conditioning, for endurance activities and for weight loss in obese subjects (for whom prolonged physical activity can be challenging).

== Equipment ==
There are now a wide variety of palm cooling devices available and they are gaining acceptance among fitness enthusiasts and high level sports teams and programs. The devices vary in a few specific ways. Those that use negative pressure (mild vacuum), those that operate in atmospheric pressure, those that include a self cooling system and others that need to be re-cooled after extended periods of use. Most of these devices attempt to achieve a temperature of 50-60 °F. This range is generally considered the optimal temperature band for palm cooling where efficient heat transfer can occur without inducing vasoconstriction of the AVAs.

=== Using Negative Pressure ===
Palm cooling devices use mild vacuum while cooling the palm through conduction via a cooling medium which flows through a pad upon which the palm of the hand is placed inside the glove.

The theory behind the use of a mild vacuum is that the blood flow to the palm is increased thereby producing 33% greater heat transfer, which is occurring through conduction.

=== Using Atmospheric Pressure ===
Palm cooling devices operate in atmospheric pressure where the palm is cooled through a combination of conduction and convection via a jet of fluid targeting the palm of the hand.

The theory behind operating in atmospheric pressure is that heat transfer may be facilitated through a combination of conduction and convection, which produces greater heat transfer than conduction on its own.

=== Negative Pressure versus Atmospheric Pressure ===
Published research comparing the use of mild vacuum and no vacuum when palm cooling provides contrary evidence where moderating core temperature is the objective. One study, by Matthew R Kuennen et al., shows no difference in outcomes between the use of mild vacuum and no vacuum, while another, by Dennis A Grahn et al., showed the use of mild vacuum to be more effective.

== Effectiveness ==
Palm cooling research has expanded beyond managing heat stress to include endurance, strength & conditioning and weight loss.

=== Endurance ===
Dr Dennis Grahn et al., of Stanford University conducted research into the impact of palm cooling in aerobic exercise endurance in a hot environment. This study involved applying palm cooling for the duration of the experiment to one hand of the subject while running on a treadmill. It was found that palm cooling extended aerobic exercise work capacity when compared to no cooling.

A study by Andrew R Hsu et al., involving cyclists completing a 30 km time trial concluded that palm cooling for the duration of the trial lowered tympanic (ear) temperature, enabled a higher sustained workload and a faster completion time compared to no cooling.

=== Strength & Conditioning ===
Professor Craig Heller et al., conducted studies into the use of palm cooling as an aid to strength & conditioning. Dr Heller reported achieving strength gains on a par with the use of steroids simply by using intermittent palm cooling between training sets with the focus particularly on bench press and pull ups (chin ups). Male subjects achieved 27% greater improvements in work capacity when using palm cooling between sets compared to no cooling.

A study from 2021 by O'brien et al., compared rowing ergometry performance with the use of intermittent palm cooling vs not. This study concluded that lower heart rates and blood lactate concentrations from intermittent cooling caused subjects to experience less fatigue during those workouts and enabled more work to be performed.

A study by Young Sub Kwon et al., consisted of a randomised, double blind, cross over study where subjects used palm cooling (10 °C), palm heating (45 °C) and palm neutral (25 °C) interventions in a bench press study. All subjects used all 3 interventions and were randomly allocated to one of three groups. One group used palm cooling first, another group used palm cooling second and the third group used palm cooling last. For all three groups palm cooling produced on average a 26% increase in work capacity compared to palm neutral. Palm heating produced a 9% increase in work capacity compared to palm neutral.

A similar study was conducted by Young Sub Kwon, et al., where the subjects were all female. In this study the palm cooling produced a 16.8% increase in work capacity and palm heating produced a 13.6% increase in work capacity compared to palm neutral.

A study by J. F. Caruso et al., focused on palm cooling and the leg press exercise, which found clearance of blood lactate and heat removal was greater with intermittent palm cooling. Degradation in average power was also delayed when using palm cooling compared to no cooling.

=== Weight Loss ===
A study conducted by Dr Stacy Sims et al., of Stanford University, found the exercise capacity of sedentary obese women was increased with the use of palm cooling. The female subjects using cooling during their exercise sessions lost more weight and improved their exercise capacity compared to the non-cooling control group. Dr Sims said that the drop-out rate was reduced for the cohort of women using cooling.

=== Heat Stress Management ===
The initial research focused on mediating core temperature in hypothermic individuals through palm warming and the management of heat stress was investigated using a similar technique i.e. through palm cooling.

Dennis Grahn et al. conducted research at Stanford University and concluded core temperature could be mediated through palm cooling or palm heating when cooling the palm in conjunction with a mild vacuum.

Research conducted by Matthew R Kuennen et al. found palm cooling using the Stanford Glove device was ineffective during simulated armoured vehicle transport.

At the Veterans Affairs Palo Alto Health Care System Andrew R Hsu et al., conducted research into the effect of palm cooling during a cycling exercise in the heat and found no significant impact.

Tessa Maroni at the University of Western Australia lead a research study which compared cooling of one palm with the cooling of two palms. The conclusion was that cooling two palms simultaneously was no more effective than cooling one palm. Both modalities were equally effective in reducing core temperature in hyperthermic individuals as was the use of a cooling jacket.
