= Paul Wood (author) =

New Zealand motivational speaker and author

- Born: 1976 or 1977 (age 48–49)
- Education: Massey University
- Known for: How To Escape From Prison, Mental Fitness
- Website: https://paulwood.com/

Paul Wood is a New Zealand motivational speaker, author, facilitator, and doctor of psychology.

== Biography ==
Wood left high school early, associating with a peer group which valued drugs and violence. Wood was dependent on drugs, committing crimes to maintain his habit. At 18 years old, Wood went to prison in Paremoremo Prison for murdering his 42 year old drug dealer, Boyd Bevan, after he attempted to sexually assault Wood. Wood was convicted of murder and served 11 years in prison. Wood's mother died three days before the murder. He served part of his sentence in Paremoremo Prison, which he described as "New Zealand’s toughest facility."

From prison, he started a PhD in psychology. Wood completed his undergraduate and master's degrees while imprisoned, and he commenced a PhD, which he completed in 2011. He is the first New Zealander to have achieved both feats. More than 10 years after his release, the Parole Board granted Wood a rare discharge.

Wood has written a bestselling book How to Escape from Prison, an autobiography on his life, Mental Fitness, a self-help book on building resilience, and Better Never Stops, a book on continuous improvement. He also spoke at TEDxAuckland and other conferences.

== Personal life and views ==
Wood is married with children.

== Work ==
=== Books ===
- Wood, Paul (1 August 2019). How to Escape from Prison. HarperCollins, 2019. ISBN 978-1775491507.
- Wood, Paul (June 2021). Mental Fitness. HarperCollins. ISBN 9781775491989.
- Wood, Paul (July 2026). Better Never Stops: Perfect for fans of Habits of High Performers and Atomic Habits. HarperCollins. ISBN 978-1-77554-297-1

=== Speech ===
- Wood, Paul (5 December 2012). "What's Your Prison?: Paul Wood at TEDxAuckland". YouTube. TEDxAuckland.
