= ODocs Eye Care =

oDocs Eye Care
- Company type: Private
- Industry: Medical devices
- Founded: 2014
- Founders: Hong Sheng Chiong, Ben O'Keeffe
- Headquarters: Wellington, New Zealand
- Area served: Worldwide
- Products: Smartphone-based ophthalmic imaging devices

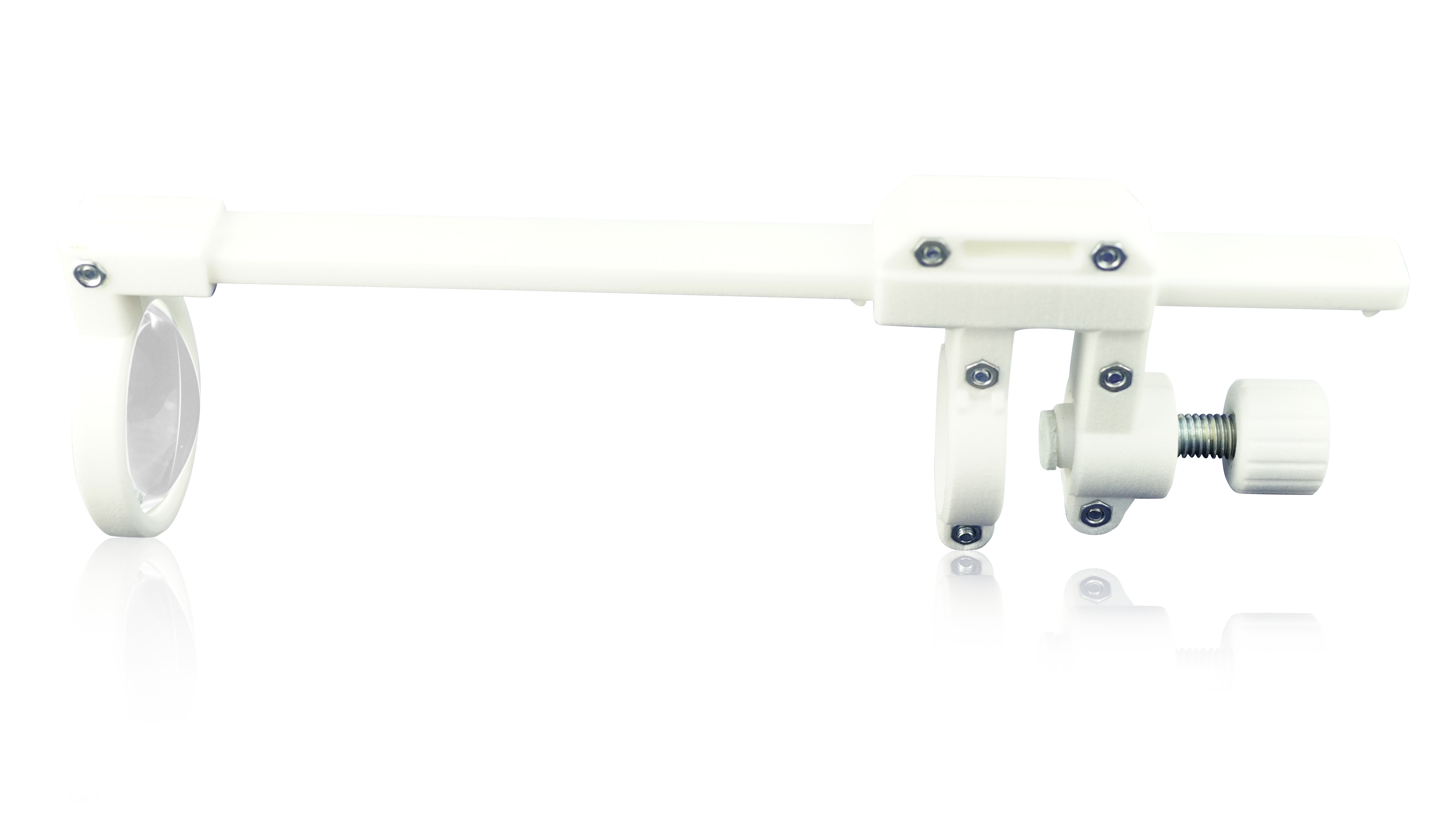
oDocs Fundus, a smartphone retinal imaging adapter

oDocs Eye Care is a New Zealand social enterprise. It was founded in 2014 by ophthalmologists Hong Sheng Chiong and Ben O'Keeffe in Wellington, New Zealand. The company sought to improve access to eye care by making affordable smartphone-based ophthalmic imaging devices. Their product, ODocs, was publicly disclosed in 2015 when he delivered the message at TEDxAuckland. In 2015, the company won the New Zealand Health Informatics Clinician challenge for the active project category.
