= Puawai Cairns =

New Zealand museum curator

- Education: Waikato University
- Employer: Te Papa

Puawai Cairns is a curator, writer and museum manager who holds a senior role at Te Papa, the national museum of New Zealand.

Puawai Cairns is Māori and affiliates to the nations Ngāti Ranginui, Ngāi Te Rangi and Ngāti Pūkenga.

== Education ==
Cairns is Māori and affiliates to the nations Ngāti Ranginui, Ngāi Te Rangi and Ngāti Pūkenga. She studied at Waikato University and has a master's degree in English Literature (2001).

== Career ==
=== As a curator ===
One of her first curatorial roles was with the exhibition of Māori cloaks called Kahu Ora: Living Cloaks. She was 'pivotal' in the development of Te Papa's Gallipoli: The Scale of Our War exhibition, and is a co-author of the book of the exhibition. The book Home, Little Māori, Home by Rikihana Carkeek served as a reference for Cairns for this exhibition.

In 2020 she was appointed to the executive leadership team of Te Papa as Director of Audience and Insight. She has worked at Te Papa before as the Head of Mātauranga Māori, in this position in 2018 she said, "my role is to create more space and opportunity for Māori to tell their stories on their own terms".

In 2022 Cairns made a comment on social media about the actions of International Committee of Museums (ICOM) in response to a Marilyn Monroe dress being worn by a celebrity. Cairns pointed out that for museums to preserve items away from touch can mean it cuts off the cultural life of that object with its people. Her comments made the ICOM reconsider their position.

=== Other ===
She co-authored a book with Stephanie Gibson and Matariki Williams called Protest Tautohetohe: Objects of resistance, persistence and defiance that won an award in 2019 Best Illustrated Non-fiction (Ockham New Zealand Book Awards).

Verb Wellington literary festival programmed an event Wawata: Moon Dreaming with Hinemoa Elder and Cairns in 2022.

Cairns is a member of a number of governance boards including Heritage New Zealand Pouhere Taonga and Atamira Dance Company.

== See also ==
- Anti-nuclear protests
- TEDxTauranga
