= USS Bagaduce (ATA-194) =

Tugboat of the United States Navy

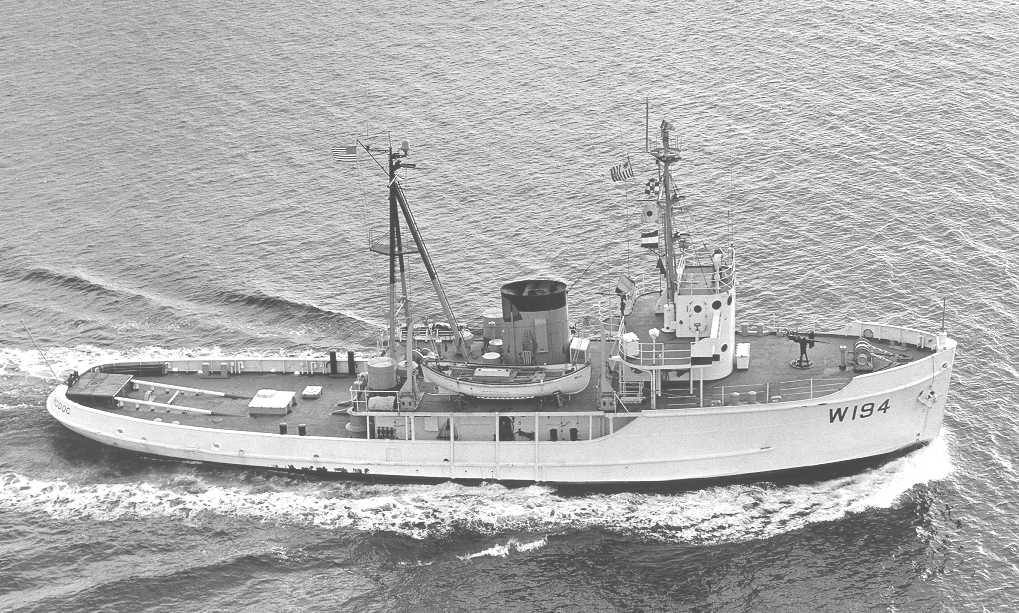
- USCGC Modoc (WMEC-194), ex-Bagaduce

History

United States
- Builder: Levingston Shipbuilding Co., Orange, TX
- Reclassified: Auxiliary Fleet Tug ATA-194, 15 May 1944
- Laid down: 7 November 1944
- Launched: 4 December 1944
- Commissioned: 14 February 1945
- Renamed: USS Bagaduce (ATA-194), 16 July 1948
- Decommissioned: 17 July 1953
- Stricken: 25 August 1958
- Nickname(s): "Douche Bag"
- Fate: Transferred to the US Coast Guard, 15 April 1959

United States
- Name: USCGC Modoc
- Acquired: 15 April 1959
- Commissioned: 20 April 1959
- Decommissioned: 31 May 1979
- Identification: MMSI number: 368094020; USCG Doc. No.: 1138728
- Nickname(s): "Mud Duck"
- Fate: Sold in 1980 sold to Marine Power & Equipment, Seattle, WA.

General characteristics
- Class & type: Sotoyomo-class auxiliary fleet tug
- Displacement: 534 t.(lt) 835 t.(fl)
- Length: 143 ft (44 m)
- Beam: 33 ft (10 m)
- Draft: 13 ft (4.0 m)
- Propulsion: diesel-electric engines, single screw
- Speed: 13 knots (24 km/h; 15 mph)
- Complement: 45
- Armament: one single 3 in (76 mm) dual purpose gun mount; two single 20 mm AA gun mounts
- Notes: Call sign:NIJB

The auxiliary ocean tug USS ATA-194 was laid down on 7 November 1944 at Orange, Texas, by the Levingston Ship Building Co.; launched 4 December 1944; and commissioned at Orange on 14 February 1945.

After her shakedown cruise, ATA-194 sailed for the Pacific with equipment in tow. She transited the Panama Canal late in March and arrived at Pearl Harbor on 29 April 1945. After two berth shifting operations early in May 1945, the tug got underway on 23 May 1945 with a barracks ship in tow, bound for the western Pacific. Steaming by way of Eniwetok, Guam, and Saipan, ATA-194 arrived at Leyte, Philippines, on 9 July 1945. The auxiliary tug operated in the central Pacific through September, towing equipment between Kwajalein, Eniwetok and Guam.

ATA-194 arrived at Buckner Bay, Okinawa, on 14 October 1945, just before Typhoon Louise struck the anchorage on 15 October 1945 and caused severe damage among the assembled ships. As a consequence, she spent the next month aiding warships and support craft damaged in that storm. These salvage operations included retracting two Landing Craft Infantry (LCI) from the beach and an Auxiliary Mine Sweeper (YMS) from a reef. Assigned to the Philippine Sea Frontier, the tug remained in the Far East into the following year of 1946. In the spring of 1946, she supported preparations for Operation Crossroads, a two-detonation atmospheric nuclear test held in summer, 1946 at Bikini Atoll in the Marshall Islands. She returned to the west coast in late May 1946 and moored at Seattle, Washington, on 15 June 1946.

Reassigned to the 17th Naval District, ATA-194 sailed for duty in Alaskan waters later that summer of 1946. Aside from an overhaul at Puget Sound in the summer of 1947, the tug operated for the next six years out of the Alaskan ports of Kodiak, Cold Bay, Adak, Anchorage, Attu and Dutch Harbor. She was named Bagaduce on 15 July 1948. Upon arrival in Seattle on 2 July 1953, she was transferred to the 13th Naval District and ordered to prepare for assignment to the Military Sea Transportation Service (MSTS).

Bagaduce was decommissioned on 17 July 1953 and transferred to MSTS on 31 August 1953. Assigned to the northern Pacific, she returned to the Kodiak area for another five years of towing duty. The tug was transferred to the Maritime Administration, for lay-up in its National Defense Reserve Fleet (NDRF) at Olympia, Washington, on 25 August 1958. Her name was struck from the Naval Vessel Register that same day and she was later transferred to the Coast Guard.

== USCGC Modoc (WATA/WMEC-194) ==
The tug was transferred to the Coast Guard and was commissioned as the Auxiliary Tug USCGC Modoc (WATA-194) on 20 April 1959, named in honor of the Modoc Indians. She then reported to her home port of Coos Bay, Oregon, where she replaced the aging 125-foot cutter USCGC Bonham (WSC-129). Bonham's crew had cross-decked to Modoc and a rumor from the time was that her commissioning had been ordered so quickly that there had not been sufficient time to paint over her entire Navy gray hull and only the shore-side of Modoc was painted white. From 1959 to 1970 she was stationed at Coos Bay, Oregon where she was used for coastal and off-shore search and rescue, oceanography, and law enforcement duties, primarily fisheries enforcement. Her normal area of operations extended from the California–Oregon border to Canada and she was also occasionally called upon to patrol the Gulf of Alaska. When not underway, Modoc was on continual alert and was capable of getting underway within two hours to proceed to a vessel in distress. A unit history written by an anonymous crewman sometime in the mid-1970s noted:

"Designed and built from the keel up along the lines of a classic European oceangoing tug, the MODOC will literally tow anything afloat. She is fully equipped to carry out major coastal and long-range search and rescue operations, one of her two major mission areas. MODOC's other prime mission is law enforcement. This cutter, along with other west coast cutters, patrols the waters off Oregon, Washington, and California, locating and identifying foreign fishing vessels. In addition, the operations and catch of these vessels are monitored and the vessels frequently boarded. Foreign vessels found in violation of our national fisheries laws within 12–miles [22–km] would be brought into port and prosecuted in federal court. As you read this, the MODOC is on fisheries patrol performing this duty."

Her boom and heavy towing gear was removed in August 1963. Also during that month her crew assisted in a special guard detail at Tongue Point Coast Guard Base, Oregon, during a visit by President John F. Kennedy at the dedication of the first Job Corps center on the west coast. In January 1965 she assisted the Canadian tug La–Force, for which the owners of La–Force, the Vancouver Tug Boat Company, presented the cutter with a silver tea service. On 20 September 1967 she escorted the disabled Danish M/V–Marieskou following a collision with the Chitose–Maru four miles north of Cape Flattery. Modoc was reclassified as a Medium Endurance Cutter, WMEC-194, in 1968. She and her sister Comanche (WMEC-202) were the smallest cutters designated as WMEC. On 17 March 1968 she assisted USS Chowanoc (ATF-100) recover her tow of DE-373 25–miles west of Coos Bay.

During 28 February 1968 to 1 March 1968 Modoc, USCGC Ivy (WLB-329), MV Kure Maru and MV Transoneida assisted following collision between the Japanese M/V–Suwaharu and the Liberian M/V Mandoil II off Oregon. While Ivy was waiting out a storm at anchor in Willapa Bay, Washington; Ivy was called to assist the Japanese M/V Suwaharu Maru carrying a cargo of logs and the Liberian M/V Mandoil II carrying a cargo of naptha which had collided 340 miles from the Columbia River Bar off the Oregon coast. Due to heavy seas Ivy was underway to the scene for nearly 24 hours. In heavy seas, darkness and a snow storm Ivy rescued 68 crewmen from the Japanese vessel, which had jettisoned logs in an effort to stay afloat. Floating logs destroyed one of Ivy's lifeboats, however no men lost were lost. The Liberian tanker of naphtha exploded and burned; the entire crew perished. Ivy was relieved by Modoc and transported the Japanese crew to Astoria, Oregon.

On 1 August 1968 she rescued the lone survivor from the F/V–Rodoma.

From 1970 until 1979 Modoc was stationed at Coos Bay, Oregon. A patrol summary dated 17 October 1970 gives some insight into her routine patrols:

"The U.S. Coast Guard Cutter MODOC (WMEC-194) with its crew of 5–officers and 34–enlisted personnel returned to port today after completing Law Enforcement Patrol duties off the coast of Oregon and Washington. The ship was underway for 120–hours and traveled 955 miles ... Thirty-six different Soviet vessels were detected operating between 14 and 20 miles off shore from Cape Arago to Grays Harbor ... No violations of the contiguous fishing zone or territorial waters were detected."

On 3 June 1972 an off-duty Modoc crewman, SA James Carignan, of Olympia, Washington, drowned while attempting to save a 12-year-old girl who had been swept away from a beach by the surf. He was posthumously awarded the Coast Guard Medal. In January 1974 Modoc braved 100-knot (190 km/h) winds to assist the stricken tug Sea–Racer and her tow, the former Liberty ship Arlington. In November 1974 she retrieved the 40-foot high special environmental data buoy EBO-2 from the Cobb Seamount. On 15 May 1975 she seized the Polish 278-foot fish factory trawler Kalmar 10 miles off Monterey, California, for fishing inside the 12-mile limit and escorted her to San Francisco. A news release about the incident noted:

"The Polish fishing vessel KALMAR, seized by the Coast Guard 10–miles off the Monterey coast early this morning was cited for fishing inside the 12–mile limit. Homeported in Swinouj'scie, Poland, the vessel carries a crew of approximately 70 men. The KALMAR fished off the West Coast during the 1974 foreign fishing season. It was first observed fishing off California in 1975 off Half Moon Bay on January–14 by a Coast Guard Air Station aircraft patrol from San Francisco. In March 1975 she was observed conducting fishing operations in the vicinity of Coos–Bay, Oregon. During April and May of this year Coast Guard patrols observed the KALMAR fishing off Point Reyes, Half Moon Bay and Santa Cruz."

In August 1975 Modoc safely towed the disabled East German stern-trawling factory-ship Rudolph Leonhard to Coos Bay. In November of that year, during a severe gale, she attempted to locate the hulk of the Korean fishing vessel Kwang Myong No.–96 that had been abandoned by her crew after a fire. Modoc was unable to locate the hulk and turned back after heavy seas caused 45-degree rolls that led to injuries among some of the crew and caused structural damage.

She remained in Coos Bay for the remainder of her Coast Guard career, primarily patrolling fisheries. Modoc departed on 28 October 1977 to undergo a renovation and refurbishment period at the Lake Union drydocks near Seattle. While returning to her home port on 18 December 1977, Modoc narrowly avoided a collision with the loaded 810-foot tanker Arco Sag–River at the mouth of the Strait of Juan de Fuca.

Modoc put to sea on New Year's Eve 1977 to assist in the seizure of the Panamanian-registered MV Cigale off the mouth of New River, south of Bandon, Oregon. Six tons of marijuana in the form of "Thai Sticks" from Southeast Asia, valued at $16.8 million, were seized. Modoc crewmen boarded the MV Cigale to thwart an attempt to scuttle the vessel then towed MV Cigale to the Empire docks in Coos Bay and later to Portland, Oregon. Modoc received the Coast Guard Meritorious Unit Commendation for the action.

After 8 years of U.S. Navy service, 5 years with the Military Sea Transportation Service (MSTS) and 20 years of U.S. Coast Guard service, Modoc was decommissioned on 31 May 1979 at Coast Guard Base Seattle. Modoc was placed on "Inactive, Out of Commission, In Reserve" status. Her final commanding officer was Lieutenant Commander C. G. Boyer, US Coast Guard. Her crew cross-decked to her replacement, the 180-foot tender Citrus (WLB-300). Modoc was later sold. In 2004, she was renamed Modoc–Pearl and was used as a bed and breakfast inn at Gig Harbor, Washington.

== Earthrace Conservation ==
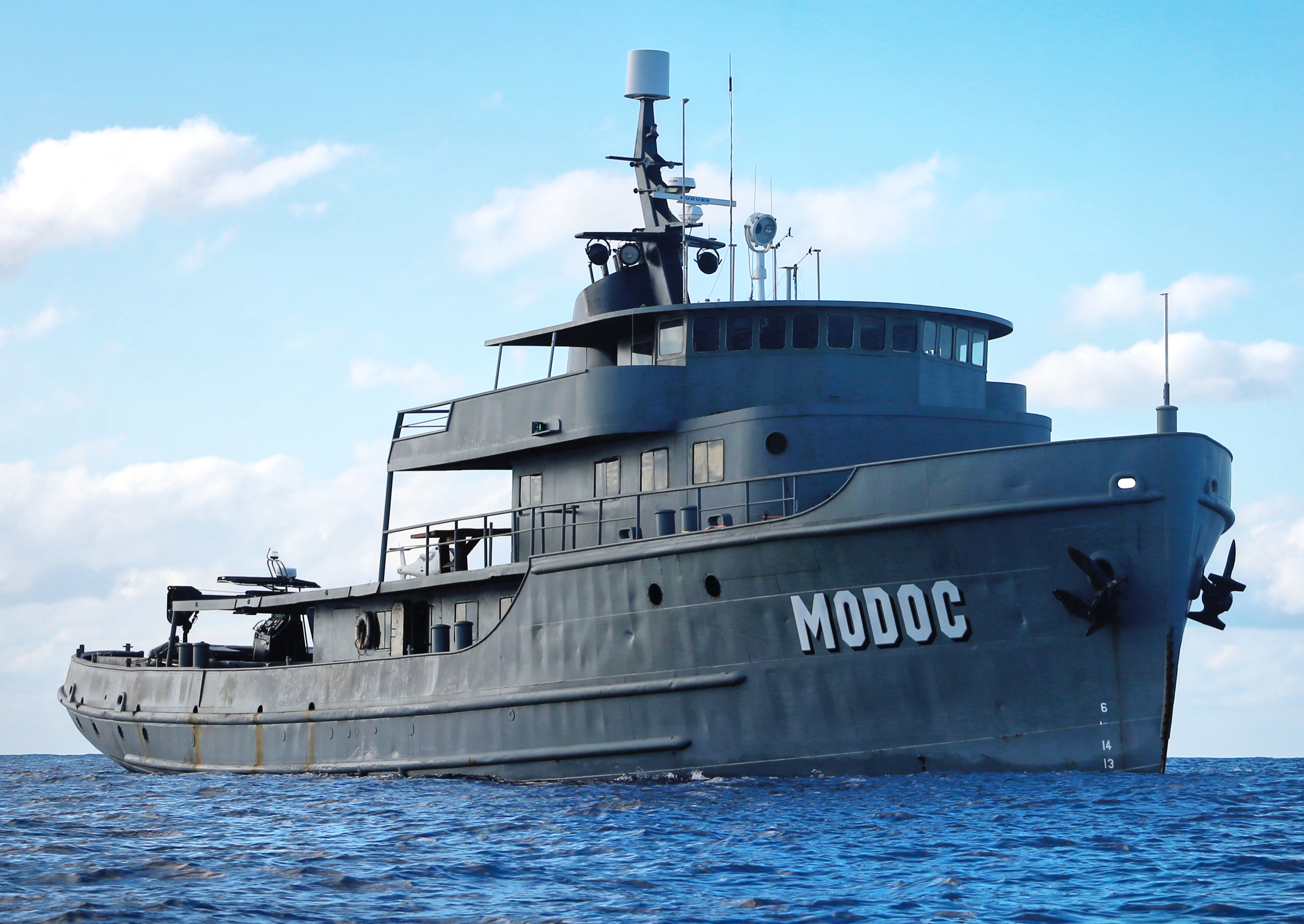
Modoc at Socorro Island, Mexico in December 2019.

Modoc was purchased by Pete Bethune's Earthrace Conservation in 2019 for use as the organization's base of operations.

== Awards ==
- Coast Guard Meritorious Unit Commendation
- Coast Guard Battle Efficiency "E" Ribbon
- American Campaign Medal
- Asian-Pacific Campaign Medal
- World War II Victory Medal
- Navy Occupation Medal
- National Defense Service Medal (2 awards)
