= USS Barbican =

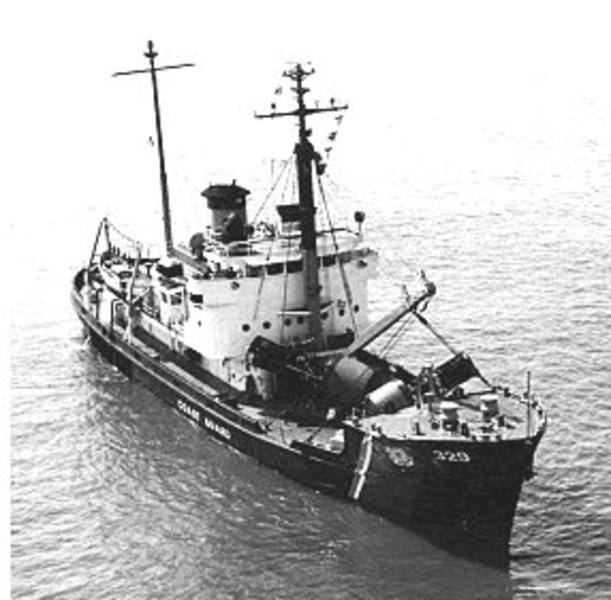
- USCGC IVY (WLB-329)

History

United States
- Name: USS Barbican (ACM-5)
- Builder: Marietta Manufacturing Company, Point Pleasant, West Virginia
- Yard number: 476
- Laid down: as USAMP Col. George Armistead for the U.S. Army
- Acquired: 6 January 1945
- Commissioned: 24 March 1945
- Decommissioned: 12 June 1946
- Reclassified: ACM-5, 19 January 1945
- Stricken: 19 July 1946
- Identification: IMO number: 7230745
- Fate: Transferred to the Coast Guard, 18 June 1946, USCGC Ivy (WLB-329), acquired 1969 by Foss Maritime renamed as the Agnes Foss.
- Notes: Call sign NRVB

General characteristics
- Class & type: Chimo-class minelayer
- Displacement: 1,320 long tons (1,341 t) full
- Length: 188 ft 2 in (57.35 m)
- Beam: 37 ft (11 m)
- Draft: 12 ft 6 in (3.81 m)
- Speed: 12.5 knots (23.2 km/h; 14.4 mph)
- Complement: 69
- Armament: 1 × 40 mm gun

USS Barbican (ACM-5) was a Chimo-class minelayer in the United States Navy. Barbican was later commissioned in U.S. Coast Guard as USCGC Ivy (WLB / WAGL-329).

Barbican was constructed as the Army Mine planter USAMP Col. George Armistead (MP-3) by the Marietta Manufacturing Co. at Point Pleasant, West Virginia and delivered to the U.S. Army in December 1942. The ship was acquired by the U.S. Navy from the Army Coast Artillery at Charleston, South Carolina, on 6 January 1945; renamed Barbican and designated an auxiliary minelayer, ACM-5, on 19 January 1945; converted for naval service by the Charleston Navy Yard; and placed in commission there on 24 March 1945.

== Service history ==
=== U.S. Navy ===
Following shakedown training out of Charleston, South Carolina, between 31 March and 24 April 1945, Barbican arrived in the Pacific late in the summer of 1945 too late to participate in the war against Japan. In fact, Barbican did not depart Pearl Harbor and head for the western Pacific until 17 August 1945, two days after the Japanese capitulation ended hostilities. On her way west, the auxiliary minelayer made one stop at Midway Island before arriving at Saipan in the Marianas on 20 September 1945.

There, she reported for duty with the Commander, Minecraft, Pacific Fleet. For a little more than a month, she served as tender and flagship for a squadron of motor minesweepers (YMS), performing those duties both at Saipan and at Okinawa. Late in October 1945, the ship moved from Okinawa to Sasebo, where she took part in the postwar occupation of Japan. That assignment lasted until 24 February 1946, when she headed back to the United States reporting to the Commandant, 12th Naval District, late in April 1946 for duty pending inactivation. Barbican was placed out of commission at San Francisco, on 12 June 1946 and was transferred simultaneously to the U.S. Coast Guard. Her name was struck from the Navy list on 19 July 1946.

=== U.S. Coast Guard ===
The fourth tender named Ivy, she was one of five Chimo-class U.S. Army mine-layers acquired by the Coast Guard and entered service with the Coast Guard in 1947. She was initially stationed at Miami, Florida, and was assigned to tend aids to navigation (ATON) and conduct search and rescue (SAR) and law enforcement (LE) operations when required. She also tended the Cape Flattery Light Station frequently. During her Coast Guard service Ivy frequently operated from Coast Guard Base Tongue Point Astoria, Oregon for extended periods.

She transferred to Portland, Oregon on 29 June 1951 where she remained home ported during the rest of her Coast Guard career. On 29 June 1951 she assisted M/V Alan Seeger and M/V Audrey following a collision. On 23 October 1952 she assisted the M/V Paul T. Seafarer, and on 12 February 1954 she assisted F/V Western Fisherman.

On 27 March 1954 she dragged for a sunken fishing vessel off the lower Columbia River. On 1 August 1958 she grounded near Lake Washington but sustained no damage and was re-floated.

In August 1959 she served on a law enforcement patrol off Puget Sound, Washington. On 15 January 1961 she assisted in the search and recovery attempt of F/V Mermaid off the Columbia River Bar.

During the end of February 1968 to 1 March 1968 Ivy waited out a storm at anchor in Willapa Bay, Washington. On 1 March 1968 she was called to assist the Japanese M/V Suwaharu Maru carrying a cargo of logs and the Liberian M/V Mandoil II carrying a cargo of naptha which had collided 340 miles from Columbia River bar off the Oregon coast. Due to heavy seas Ivy was underway to the scene for nearly 24 hours. In heavy seas, darkness and a snow storm Ivy rescued 68 crewmen from the Japanese vessel, which had jettisoned logs in an effort to stay afloat. Floating logs destroyed one of Ivy's lifeboats, however no crew lost were lost. The Liberian tanker of naphtha exploded and burned; the entire crew perished. The Ivy was relieved by USCGC Modoc (WATA-194) and transported the Japanese crew to Astoria, Oregon. Two merchant vessels also participated in the rescue: MV Kure Maru and MV Transoneida.

During her Coast Guard service Ivy frequently operated from Coast Guard Base Tongue Point for extended periods.

After 2 years of Navy service and 24 years of Coast Guard service Ivy was decommissioned on 26 November 1969. The vessel was then acquired by Foss Maritime and renamed as Agnes Foss, the second ex-Army mine planter of the name Col. George Armistead to be operated by Foss as Agnes Foss.

== See also ==
- Mine Planter Service (U.S. Army)
- List of ships of the United States Army
- Dekanawida (YTB-334) the first USAMP Col. George Armistead to be operated by Foss as Agnes Foss
