= Dekanawida (YTB-334) =

Tugboat of the United States Navy

History

United States
- Name: Dekanawida (in service, not commissioned)
- Namesake: Dekanawida, The Great Peacemaker
- Acquired: 1942 from Foss Maritime as Mary Foss, the ex 1904 Army mine planter Col. George Armistead.
- In service: 1942
- Out of service: 1946
- Reclassified: YTB-334, 15 May 1944
- Stricken: 8 May 1946
- Fate: Reacquired by Foss Maritime 1946, renamed Agnes Foss sold 1972 to Philippine buyer & renamed Celtic.

General characteristics
- Tonnage: 630 GRT
- Length: 142 ft 0 in (43.28 m)
- Beam: 30.6 ft 0 in (9.33 m)
- Draft: 14.2 ft 0 in (4.33 m)
- Propulsion: single engine/propeller, 1,500 horsepower

The first Dekanawida (YT-334/YTB-334) was a tug in the United States Navy during World War II.

The ship was built and delivered in 1904 by Neafie & Levy Ship & Engine Building Co., Philadelphia, Pennsylvania for the U.S. Army as the Mine planter USAMP Colonel George Armistead. Armistead was sold by the U.S. Army Mine Planter Service in 1935 to Foss Towing and Barge Co., Portland, Oregon which renamed the ship Mary Foss. Mary Foss was acquired by the U.S. Navy 2 November 1942 and placed in service as Dekanawida. She was employed in the 14th Naval District, and on 15 May 1944 was reclassified YTB-334. Dekanawida was stricken from the Navy List on 8 May 1946, delivered to the Maritime Commission for disposal, reacquired by Foss Maritime and renamed as the Agnes Foss. (Note: Not to be confused with the second Agnes Foss (1942). That ship was also an ex-U.S. Army mine planter of the same name, the USAMP Col. George Armistead (MP-3) built in 1942. That ship became USS Barbican (ACM-5) and then USCGC Ivy (WAGL 329) before itself being acquired by Foss Maritime as Agnes Foss.) After sale in 1972 to a buyer in the Philippines the ship was operated as Celtic.
