= Matariki Williams =

New Zealand Māori curator, writer and editor

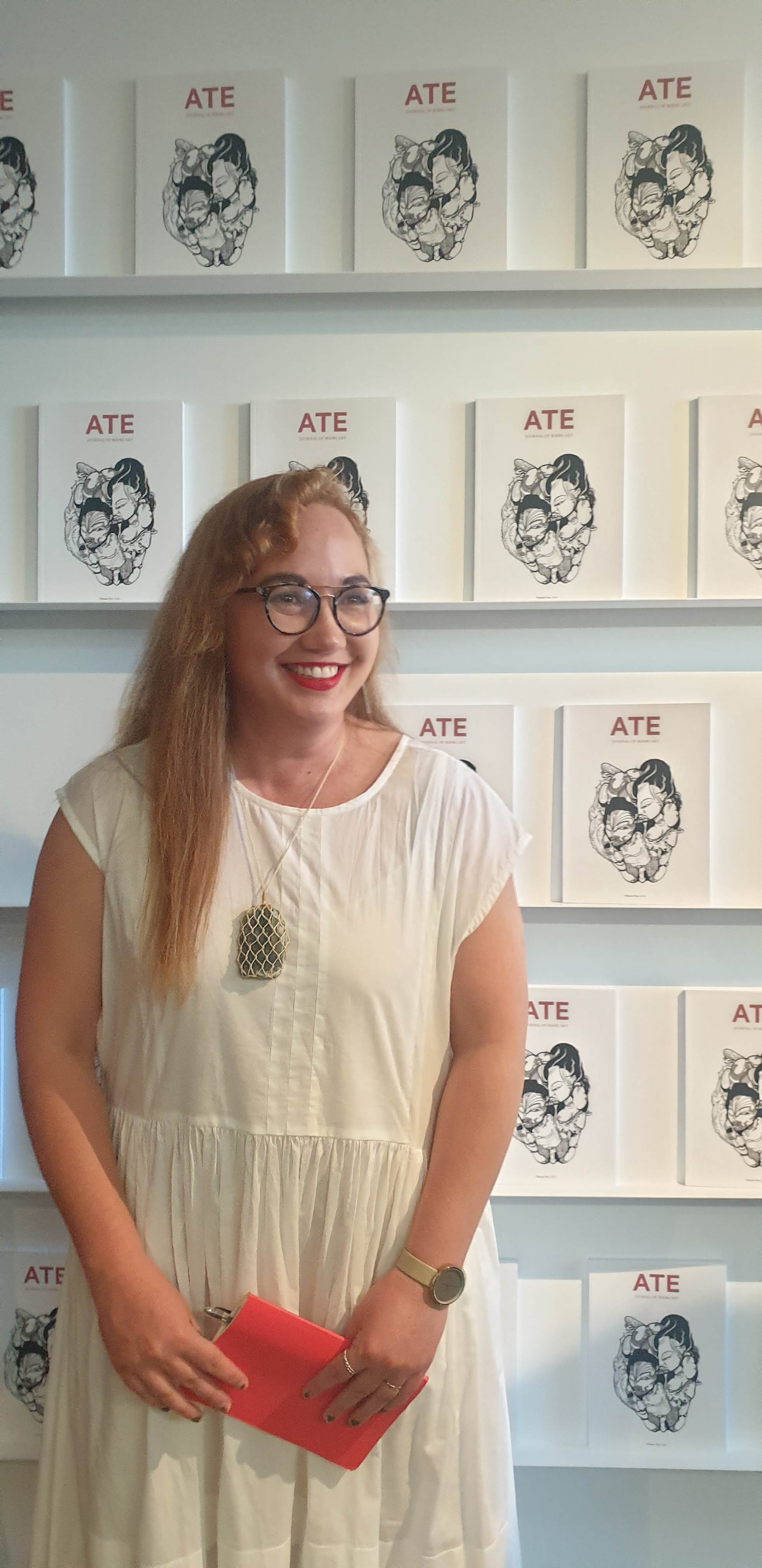
- Education: Victoria University of Wellington
- Children: 2
- Website: https://www.matarikiwilliams.com/

Matariki Williams is a Māori curator and writer based in Whakatāne, New Zealand. In 2021, she was appointed Pou Matua Mātauranga Māori, Senior Historian, Mātauranga Māori at Manatū Taonga Ministry for Culture and Heritage in Wellington. She is a member of the Ngāi Tūhoe, Ngāti Whakaue, and Ngāti Hauiti iwis.

== Early life and education ==
Williams grew up in Tauranga. She obtained an undergraduate degree in Māori studies and history at the Victoria University of Wellington. She pursued a master's degree in Museum and Heritage Studies.

== Career ==
Williams became a Matauranga Maori curator at Te Papa in late 2016. Williams is co-founder of and co-editor (alongside Bridget Reweti) of ATE Journal of Maori Arts. She co-authored Protest Tautohetohe: Objects of Resistance, Persistence and Defiance (Te Papa Press, 2019) with Puawai Cairns and Stephanie Gibson, which won the Illustrated Non-Fiction Award at the 2020 Ockham New Zealand Book Awards. In 2024, she was involved in New Zealand's delegation to the Venice Biennale.

She was awarded the 2026 Tāwhia Copyright Aotearoa and The New Zealand Society of Authors Writers' Award for a research project on Robyn Kahukiwa.

== Personal life ==
As of 2020, Williams has a partner and two children.

== Publications ==
- Protest: Tautohetohe: Objects of Resistance, Persistence and Defiance (2019), coauthor
- Te Manu Huna A Tāne (2020), contributor
