= Stacy Sims =

American exercise physiologist and author

Stacy Teresa Sims (born 1973) is an American exercise physiologist, nutrition scientist, author, and women's health and fitness advocate. A former bike racer and triathlete, she holds positions at Stanford University in the United States and at Auckland University of Technology in New Zealand and writes and speaks on best exercise and fitness practices for women.

== Early life and education ==
Born into an American military family, Sims spent much of her childhood in the Netherlands, was in a French immersion elementary school program, and received her high school education in San Francisco. She pursued ballet until she was 13, when she concentrated on running, competing in cross country running and field hockey in high school. She earned a sports science degree from Purdue University in 1995 after changing her major from political science, and instead of cross country running, competed in rowing while running for fitness, including multiple marathons. She completed a master's degree in exercise physiology and metabolism at Springfield College, where she was a member of an ultrarunning group, and after moving to New Zealand for the first time in the 1990s, a PhD at the University of Otago in 2006.

From 2007 to 2012, Sims was a research associate studying sex differences in physical activity, performance and health at Stanford University, and she has also held a research position at University of Waikato.

== Athletic career ==
Sims was a bike racer for UCI Team Tibco and triathlete. She has competed in the Ironman Kona and the Maui Xterra World Championships.

== Career in physiology ==
Sims' experiences training as an athlete, and the lack of research into how women should eat and exercise for both fitness and performance, led her to focus on women in her graduate studies and professionally, adopting the motto "Women are not small men." As of February 2026, she holds a research associate position at Auckland University of Technology. and an adjunct faculty position as an exercise physiologist and nutrition scientist with the Stanford Lifestyle Medicine group, part of the Stanford Prevention Research Center at Stanford Medical School. She formulated a low-carbohydrate rehydration drink for the Garmin-Slipstream cycling team, Secret Drink Mix, which was marketed by team nutritionist Allen Lim, and in 2012 she founded Osmo Nutrition.

Sims writes and is interviewed widely. She became a monthly columnist for Ella Cycling Tips in 2015, delivered a talk titled "Women are not small men" at TEDxTauranga in 2019,, and has published two books on fitness for women: ROAR in 2016 and Next Level in 2022, both co-authored with Selene Yeager. Her advice on exercise and nutrition for women is widely quoted.

== Personal life ==
Sims is married and has a daughter; she lives in New Zealand.

== Books ==
- Sims, Stacy T.; Yeager, Selene (2024) [2016]. Roar: How to Match Your Food and Fitness to Your Unique Female Physiology for Optimum Performance, Great Health, and a Strong, Lean Body for Life (rev. ed.). Rodale. ISBN 978-0593581926.
- Sims, Stacy T.; Yeager, Selene (2022). Next Level: Your Guide to Kicking Ass, Feeling Great, and Crushing Goals Through Menopause and Beyond. Rodale. ISBN 978-0593233153.
