= TEDxTauranga =

Event in Tauranga, New Zealand

- Website type: Conference
- Available in: English, multilingual subtitles, transcript
- Headquarters: Tauranga, New Zealand
- Area served: Tauranga
- Founder: Sheldon Nesdale
- Website: www.tedxtauranga.com
- Registration: Optional
- Launched: 2013 (first conference)
- Current status: Returning 2023

TEDxTauranga is an independent TEDx event held every 1–2 years in Tauranga, New Zealand. At TEDxTauranga, live speakers and entertainers combine to spark deep discussion and connection in a small group. The TED Conference provides general guidance for the TEDx program, but individual TEDx events, including TEDxTauranga, are self-organised by local volunteers. Other independently organised TEDx events in New Zealand include TEDxAuckland and TEDxWellington.

TED is a nonprofit devoted to the philosophy of 'ideas worth spreading' through short, powerful talks that began in 1984, including topics related to 'Technology, Entertainment and Design'. TED talks now cover a wider range of ideas, from "science to business to global issues"

Free online access to TED talks on TED and YouTube has enabled TED to reach a wider audience compared to its exclusive live conferences in the United States, which cost $8,500 per year for a standard membership. TED has allowed independent organisers to organize local TEDx talks, which are priced less than attending a traditional TED event. TEDx was 'designed to help communities, organisations and individuals to spark conversation and connection through local TED-like experiences'

== History ==
TEDxTauranga was founded as an independent event by license holder Sheldon Nesdale in 2013. Sheldon attended three TEDx events in Auckland as a member of the audience and wanted to run his own TEDx event in his home town of Tauranga, New Zealand. Ticket availability is limited to create an intimate experience and inspire discussion with the ideas presented.

Each TEDx event is based around a theme, that changes each year. Previous TEDxTauranga themes include RE:IMAGINE (2021), RE:ACTION (2019) Perspective (2017), What Fits Your Future (2016), Think, Thrive, Transform (2015), and Great Minds do not Think Alike (2014). Approximately 683 people attended the 2019 TEDxTauranga event, held at the Holy Trinity Church on 215 Devonport Road, with 11 speakers covering a range of topics. Leading New Zealand scientist Sir Ray Avery was among the speakers team for the 2015 TEDxTauranga conference.

TEDxTauranga "brings together people from many different socioeconomic and cultural backgrounds and this alone gets the conversations going". "All the people who come to speak on the TEDx stage are extremely passionate about what it is they do, what they think and getting those ideas out there". Speakers are given 15 to 18 minutes.
