= Macquarie Business School =

Business school in Sydney, Australia

- Type: Public
- Established: 1969
- Affiliations: Macquarie University
- Dean: Professor Leonie Tickle
- Faculty: 40+
- Students: 900+
- Location: Sydney, Australia
- Campus: Macquarie, Sydney CBD
- Website: www.mq.edu.au/macquarie-business-school

Macquarie Business School (MQBS) is a constituent body of Macquarie University, in Sydney, New South Wales, Australia.

MQBS is a business school originally established as the Faculty of Business and Economics. The School is the focal point for all business, management, economics research and education at Macquarie University.

== History of Macquarie Business School ==
Macquarie Business School began life as the Centre for Management Studies (CMS) within the school of Economic and Financial Studies at North Ryde, Sydney, Australia in 1969. CMS began offering a Graduate Diploma in Business Administration in 1970 and in 1972 it offered a three-year, part-time Master of Business Administration (MBA). In early 1980, CMS developed its own identity as the Graduate School of Management (GMS); it remained within the School of Economic and Financial Studies.

In the mid-1980s the GSM Advisory board recommended GSM should have a separate identity and its own separate dedicated teaching facility. Funds were raised to build the campus from the late 1980s and during the 1990s.

GSM moved to a 40-week teaching term, four-term year in 1989–1990 and this enabled the development of a 16-unit MBA which could be completed in two years' part-time. Master of Arts programs were developed and later replaced by Master of Management programs. GSM went offshore and began delivering programs in Singapore in 1992 and in Hong Kong in 1994.

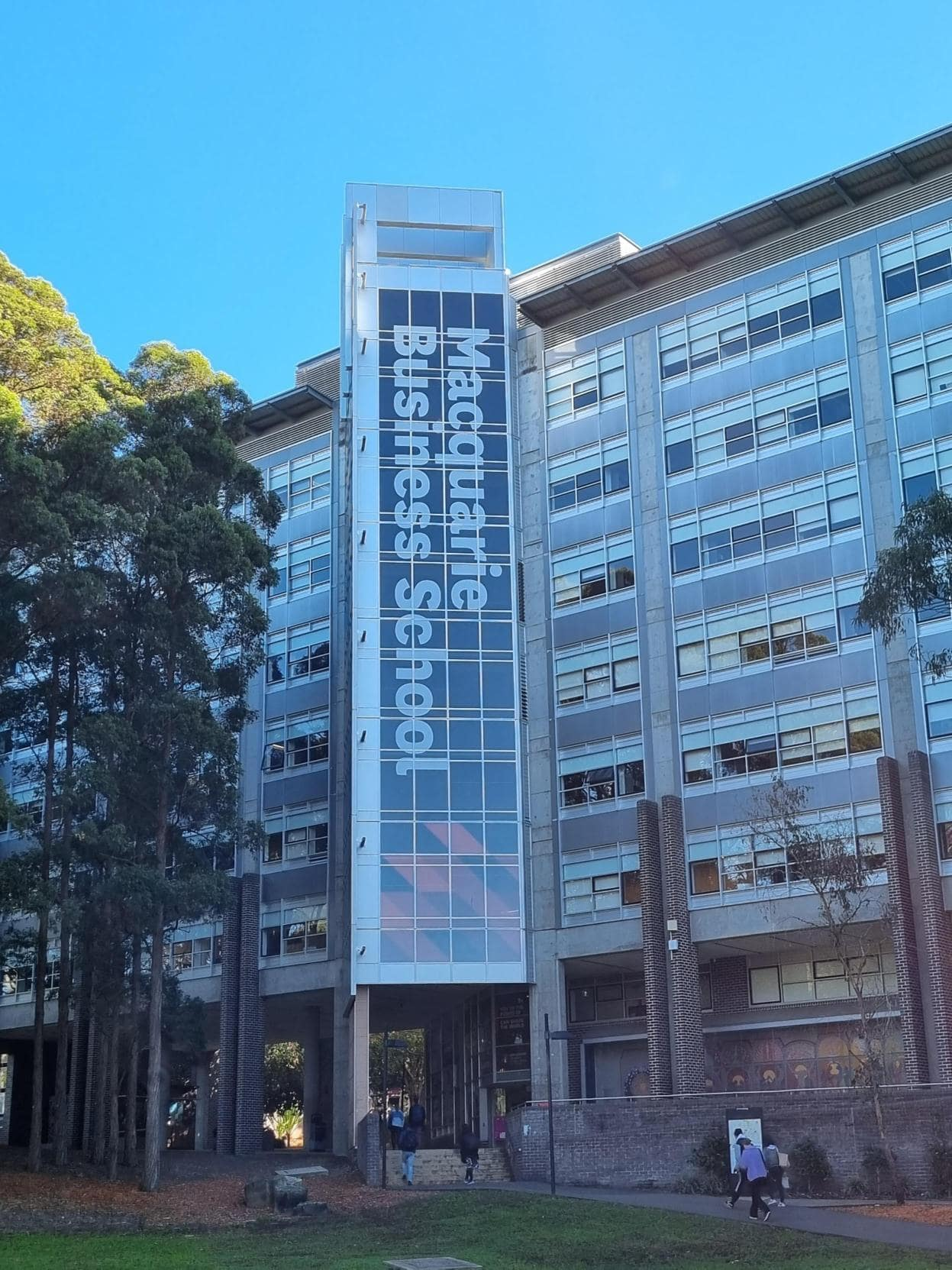
Macquarie Business School Entrance.jpg

Until 1998, MGSM consisted of two institutions, the GSM and MGSM. At this time the board decided to integrate the school and the new entity became known as MGSM.

The Sydney CBD campus was opened in 2000. MGSM launched its Online Interactive Study option in Term one of 2013.

In early 2009, the Deputy Vice Chancellor Macquarie University undertook a major review process of MGSM which decided that the school should retain its autonomy. A later review merged the MGSM into the Macquarie Business School from 2019.

== Organisation ==
MQBS exists of six departments.

- Department of Accounting and Corporate Governance
- Department of Actuarial Studies and Business Analytics
- Department of Applied Finance
- Department of Economics
- Department of Management
- Department of Marketing

== Programs ==
Macquarie Business School offers a diverse selection of programs catering to undergraduate and postgraduate students, along with Master of Business Administration (MBA) and executive courses and higher degree research.

The MBA and Executive programs at Macquarie University's Macquarie Business School provide experienced professionals with the skills and knowledge to excel as business leaders. The school offers acclaimed programs such as the Master of Business Administration, Global Master of Business Administration (GMBA), and Master of Applied Finance (MAF), as well as short courses. The MBA focuses on contemporary business skills, while the Global Master of Business Administration offers flexible online learning. The Master of Applied Finance is designed for the financial sector. The school is ranked highly in various QS Rankings and has a global alumni network.

Macquarie Business School offers higher degree research (HDR) programs for students seeking to explore their areas of interest through self-directed research. The programs include the PhD, MRes, and MPhil

== Research ==
The school's research focuses on health and social care, sustainability, data and analytics, and markets. The school has several research centers that impart expertise across industry sectors.

== Accreditation ==
=== AACSB ===
MBA and management programs are accredited by The Association to Advance Collegiate Schools of Business. 687 schools of business, or less than 5% worldwide, have this accreditation.

=== AMBA ===
AMBA accreditation is a global standard for postraduate business education, awarded by the Association of MBAs (AMBA).

== Reputation and profile ==
Rankings of Macquarie Business School.

Year	Ranking Source	Ranking Category	Ranking
	QS World University Rankings		
2026	Master of Applied Finance	Australia	1
2026	Master of Marketing	Australia	1
2026	Master of Management	Australia	2
2026	Master of Business Analytics	Australia	2
	THE World University Rankings		
2026	Business & Economics	Australia	7
2026	Business & Economics	Globally	101 - 125
	Shanghai Ranking		
2025	Finance	Australia	4
2025	Finance	Globally	51 - 75
2025	Business Administration	Australia	10
2025	Business Administration	Globally	41
2025	Management	Australia	8
2025	Management	Globally	151 - 200

== Alumni ==
There are more than 16,500 members of the Alumni Community, situated in over 135 countries around the world. Notable alumni include:

- Andrew Scipione, NSW Police Commissioner
- Mel Silva, Managing Director & VP, Google AUS & NZ
- Rob Scott, CEO, Wesfarmers
- Steve Worrall, CEO, Telstra Infraco.
- Sue Horlin, Managing Partner, Assurance, PWC
- Adam Driussi, Co-Founder and CEO, Quantium
- Skye Anderson, President, McDonald's USA
- Preeti Bajaj, Executive Vice President, Schneider Electric
- Yanuar Tedjawidjaja, Director, PwC Indonesia
- Brian Indradjaja, President Director, Country Managing Partner, Deloitte Indonesia
- Prom Sirisant, Thailand Country Manager, American Express
- Ho Anh Ngoc, Vice Chairman, Techcombank Vietnam
- Joshua Ross, CEO and Founder, Humanitix
