= TEDxAuckland =

TEDx Auckland
- Website type: Conference
- Available in: English, multilingual subtitles, transcript
- Founded: 2009; 17 years ago
- Headquarters: Auckland, New Zealand
- Area served: Auckland
- Owner: Sapling Foundation
- Founder: Elliott Blade
- Website: www.tedxauckland.com
- Registration: Optional
- Launched: 2009 (first conference)
- Current status: Active

TEDx Auckland is an independent TEDx event held annually in Auckland, New Zealand. Like other TEDx events, TEDxAuckland also obtained a free license from TED to hold the conference, with organizers agreeing to follow certain principles. In May 2016, TEDx Auckland hosted 28 speakers at the Shed 10 venue on the waterfront in Auckland.

== History ==
TEDxAuckland was founded as an independent TEDx event by producer Elliott Blade.

The fourth edition was held in August 2013, with speakers scheduled such as local cook Robert Oliver. Blade continued to organize, stating the previous event in 2012 had been sold out. The August 2013 version featured performances by artists such as Samoan hip-hop artist King Kapisi, poet Grace Taylor, singer-songwriters Joseph and Maia, and the New Zealand String Quartet.

In May 2016, TEDxAuckland hosted 28 speakers at the Shed 10 venue on the waterfront in Auckland.

== See also ==
- Culture of New Zealand
